= Aris B.C. =

Basketball club in Greece

Aris Thessaloniki
- Nickname: Aftokrátoras (The Emperor)
- Leagues: Greek Basketball League; EuroCup
- Founded: 1914; 112 years ago
- History: Aris B.C. (1922–present)
- Arena: Alexandreio Melathron (Nick Galis Hall)
- Capacity: 6,360
- Location: Thessaloniki, Greece
- Team colors: Yellow, Black
- Main sponsor: Stoiximan
- President: Charis Papageorgiou
- General manager: Nikos Zisis
- Head coach: Vassilis Spanoulis
- Team captain: Lefteris Bochoridis
- Ownership: Richard Hsiao (RHC GROUP)
- Championships: 1 FIBA Saporta Cup; 1 FIBA Korać Cup; 1 FIBA EuroCup Challenge; 10 Greek Championships; 8 Greek Cups; 1 Greek Super Cup
- Retired numbers: 1 (6)
- Website: arisbasketball.com

Aris Basketball Club (Greek: Άρης K.A.E., transliterated into English Aris B.S.A.) known in European competitions as Aris Thessaloniki, is the professional basketball team of the major Thessaloniki-based Greek multi-sport club A.C. Aris Thessaloniki. Aris BC was founded in 1914. Their traditional home arena is Alexandreio Melathron (Nick Galis Hall).

Aris B.C. is one of the most successful Greek basketball clubs of all time, tallying ten Greek League championships and eight Greek Cups, making the Double four times (1986–87, 1987–88, 1988–89, 1989–90). They have also won three European titles: the FIBA European Cup (1992–93), the FIBA Korać Cup (1996–97), and the FIBA Europe Champions Cup (2002–03). They are one of only two non-relegated teams from the Greek League, with participation in every Greek First Division Championship until today (the other team is Panathinaikos). Aris holds the record for the most consecutive wins in the Greek League, with 80 wins in a row. Before the arrival of Nikos Galis to Aris, and the first European successes of the team. Aris helped to establish basketball in Greece and to increase its popularity in the country.

Under the leadership of Nikos Galis and Panagiotis Giannakis, Aris was a significant force in Greek basketball during the 1980s and early 1990s. It is for this period of dominance that Aris BC has been nicknamed "The Emperor", and was voted the most successful Greek sporting club of the 20th century. Aris is also one of the most renowned Greek clubs in European basketball, participating in three consecutive FIBA European Champions Cup Final Fours, and later on winning three lower-tier level European titles. This period also included winning the FIBA Korać Cup in the 1996–97 season.

Notable players that have played with the club over the years include: Nikos Galis, Panagiotis Giannakis, Nikos Filippou, Lefteris Subotić, Miroslav Pecarski, Stojko Vranković, Mike Jones, Walter Berry, Edgar Jones, Roy Tarpley, Reggie Theus, Panagiotis Liadelis, Harold Ellis, José "Piculín" Ortiz, Mario Boni, Žarko Paspalj, Martin Müürsepp, Tiit Sokk, Mikhail Mikhailov, Joe Arlauckas, Giorgos Sigalas, Andrew Betts, Nikos Chatzivrettas, Nestoras Kommatos, Will Solomon, Michalis Kakiouzis, Dimos Dikoudis, Mahmoud Abdul-Rauf, Jeremiah Massey, Kostas Papanikolaou, Kostas Sloukas, Dinos Mitoglou, Aleksandar Vezenkov, Bryant Dunston, and Vasileios Toliopoulos.

== History ==
=== Early history ===
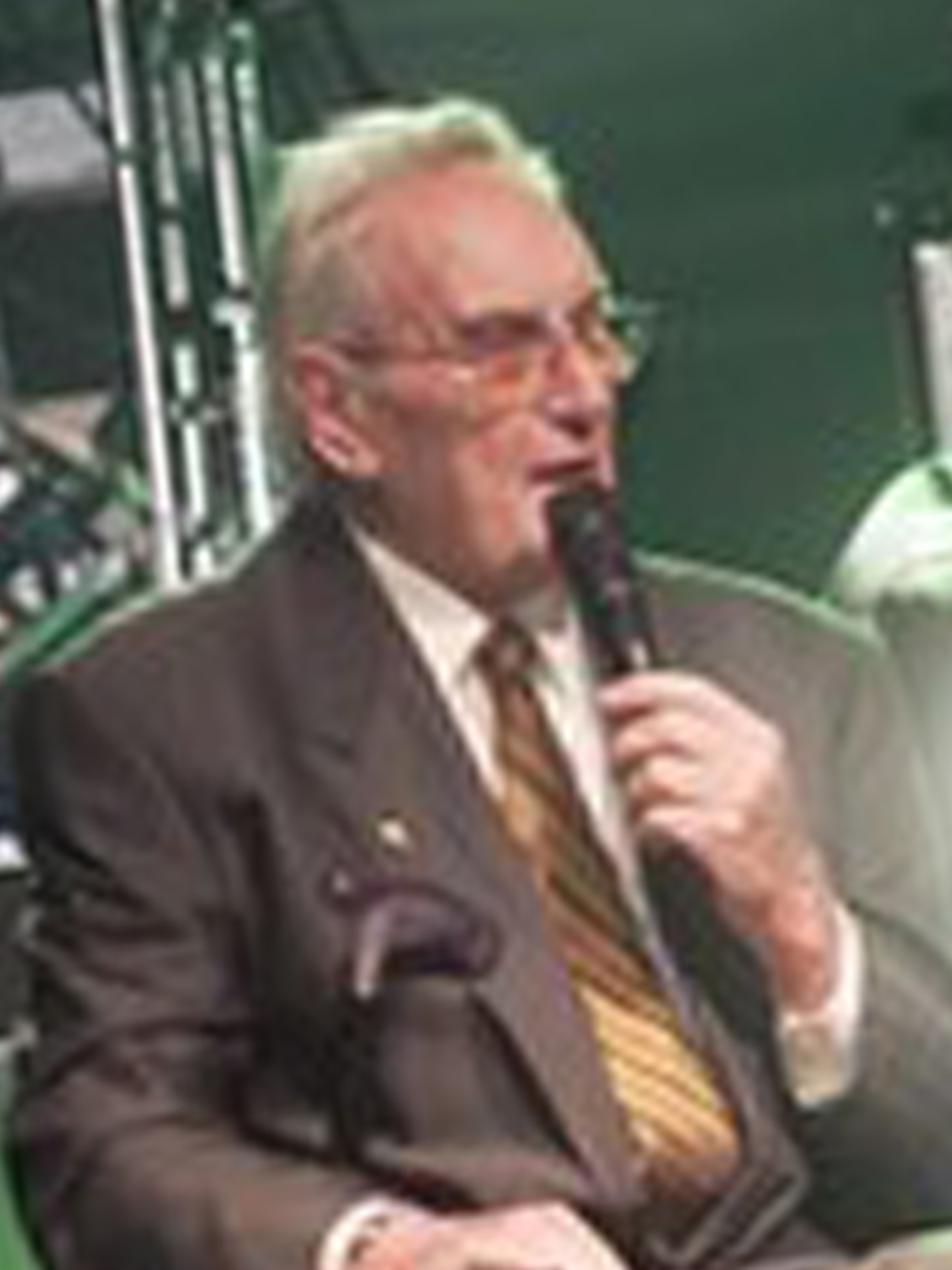
Faidon Matthaiou, player and later head coach of the team, considered the Patriarch of Greek basketball

Aris B.C., the basketball branch of Aris Thessaloniki AC, was founded in 1922, 8 years after the founding of Aris AC. The sport of basketball was new to Greece, having been introduced in the country in 1919. In those days, the teams shared a single open-air court, and Aris competed in the local Thessaloniki regional championship, which it won 5 times, in the years 1926–30. During these first steps of the sport, it was significant also the contribution of the Armenian community of the city, with players like Exoutzian, Daneilian, Benlian, Marasian, Kontaxian, Karabetian, Isujian and Jamjian.

The first nationwide Greek Championship was held in 1927–28, and Aris BC won its first Greek championship title on 23 April 1930, after beating ΧΑΝΘ with a score of 32–22. Aris quickly created a remarkable tradition in basketball, with notable figures, like Faidon Matthaiou (considered the Patriarch of Greek basketball) and Anestis Petalidis, who was coach of the team for almost two decades.

The first appearance by Aris in an official international European-wide competition was during the 1966–67 season, when they participated in the 2nd-tier level European Cup Winner's Cup, as the Greek League runners-up. From that season onward, Aris acquired the Alexandreio Melathron as its home court, which it still is to this day.

=== Legendary years: Galis, Giannakis and Ioannidis era (1978–1993) ===
==== 1978–79 Greek Champions ====
The post-World War II Greek League period was marked by the dominance of basketball teams from Athens, but this all began to change in 1979. In that year, Aris won their first Greek League championship in the modern era, largely through the inspired play of Charis Papageorgiou, and the coaching of Giannis Ioannidis, an ex-player of the team. It helped provide the spark for the complete domination of Greek basketball by Aris, during the second half of the 1980s and the early 1990s.

==== Nikos Galis arrives (1979) ====
If that first Greek championship was the spark, then the fuel for Aris' brilliant stint at the top of the sport was undoubtedly Nikos Galis, thought by many Greek basketball fans to be the best Greek basketball player of all time, and one of the best ever in Europe. Galis, the son of Rhodian immigrants from New Jersey, signed on to the team in October 1979, and played his first game against Iraklis in December of that year, scoring 30 points. Fred Develey, the former coach of Maccabi Tel Aviv, who later became coach of Aris, was instrumental in convincing the management that Galis would not only change Greek basketball, but that he would change also Greek basketball in Europe. The management was more concerned about his lack of height than his ability, until they saw him play.

==== 1982–83 Greek Champions ====
It would take another four years for Aris to rise to the top of the Greek League again, winning the national championship in 1983. That year also marked the return of Giannis Ioannidis to the Aris bench as coach.

A successful 1983–1984 season ended as Aris battled for both the Greek League championship and the Greek Cup, but lost the national cup final to crosstown rivals PAOK, and the league championship game to Panathinaikos. During Aris' games against Maccabi Tel Aviv in the qualifying round for the first-tier level FIBA European Champions Cup (EuroLeague), in the fall of 1983. Aris was narrowly eliminated by an Israeli League team, but not before posting an away win at Tel Aviv, something that no other European team had managed to do for many years.

==== 1985–1991: 7 consecutive Greek Championships (5 Doubles) ====
With the financial support of Akis Michailides, a successful Greek businessman and President of the team, Aris brought Panagiotis Giannakis to the team from Ionikos Nikaias, to play alongside players such as Nikos Filippou, Michalis Romanidis, Lefteris Subotić, Georgios Doxakis, Vassilis Lipiridis, and others, winning 7 Greek League championships, and 5 Greek Cups (with one Greek Cup being lost to Panathinaikos in 1986, as Galis performed poorly in a single-elimination game in Athens). Especially between 1985 and 1988, the question was not who the Greek League champion would be, but if Aris would go undefeated or not, as the club won an unparalleled 80 games in a row at one point.

==== European distinction ====
In the 1984–1985 season came Aris' first significant European success: Aris reached the semifinals of the 3rd-tier level FIBA Korać Cup, eventually losing to Ciaocrem Varese of the Italian League, and without the services of Galis for the first game in Thessaloniki (he was injured in practice 3 days before the game).

Aris formed the backbone of the senior Greece men's national basketball team, sending Galis, Giannakis, Filippou, Romanidis, and Lipiridis (to help Greece win the gold medal at the EuroBasket 1987, and the silver medal at the EuroBasket 1989). The back court combination of Galis-Giannakis first came to European prominence at the 1986 FIBA World Championship in Spain, where upstarts Greece performed surprisingly well, while Galis won the top-scorer of the tournament award.

It was during that year, 1986, that Aris made headlines in Europe in the FIBA European Champions Cup (EuroLeague) qualifying round. Having been eliminated by Limoges CSP of the French League in 1985 (1985–86 season), Aris was paired against Tracer Milano in the qualifying round. Tracer were arguably the best team in Europe, and had acquired Bob McAdoo, possibly the best American player to play in Europe. Aris, sporting Nikos Galis, Panagiotis Giannakis, Lefteris Subotić, and another American player, Jackson, managed a win in Thessaloniki, by 31 points, almost assuring the elimination of Tracer, and an advancement into the final group of the 6 best European teams. However, the return leg game saw Olimpia win by 34 points, thus eliminating Aris. Galis was absent due to an injury problem.

Aris had to wait for another year to compete in Europe again, but their strength had been established. In 1987, Aris was not paired against an established FIBA European Champions' Cup (now called EuroLeague) team, and thus advanced to the final round of the 8 best European champions. The same was achieved in the next four years, and while Aris did not win the FIBA European Champions' Cup, they were very successful in the tournaments, reaching the Final Four of the tournament in 1988, 1989, and 1990. By then, Aris had become a household name in basketball in Europe.

==== Favourite team in Greece ====
Aris is often attributed with increasing engagement in Greek basketball. Primarily through the play of Nikos Galis, the team drew a much larger fanbase than before by popularizing a more flashy, entertainment-oriented style of play. This approach differed from the more conventional styles used by many other teams at the time, and shifted spectators’ expectations toward basketball as a form of entertainment as well as competition.

Greek League arenas were completely sold out wherever Aris was playing, the opponents' fans were applauding Aris for their performance, and many of the streets in towns and cities were empty when Aris played European games. As Greeks throughout the country were glued to their TV sets, to watch the inspired play of Galis and company. Such was the impact that basketball briefly overtook football as the most popular sport in Greece. For example, Aris was playing basketball with other European teams every Thursday night. From that time, and even up until 2003, every Thursday night, cinemas in Greece offered tickets at reduced prices.

==== The Aris–PAOK rivalry ====
A special reference must be made to the rivalry between Aris and PAOK. The two clubs are fierce rivals in all sports, but the Aris and PAOK basketball face-offs had a distinct flavor between 1985 and 1992, as they were the top two basketball teams in Greece at that time.

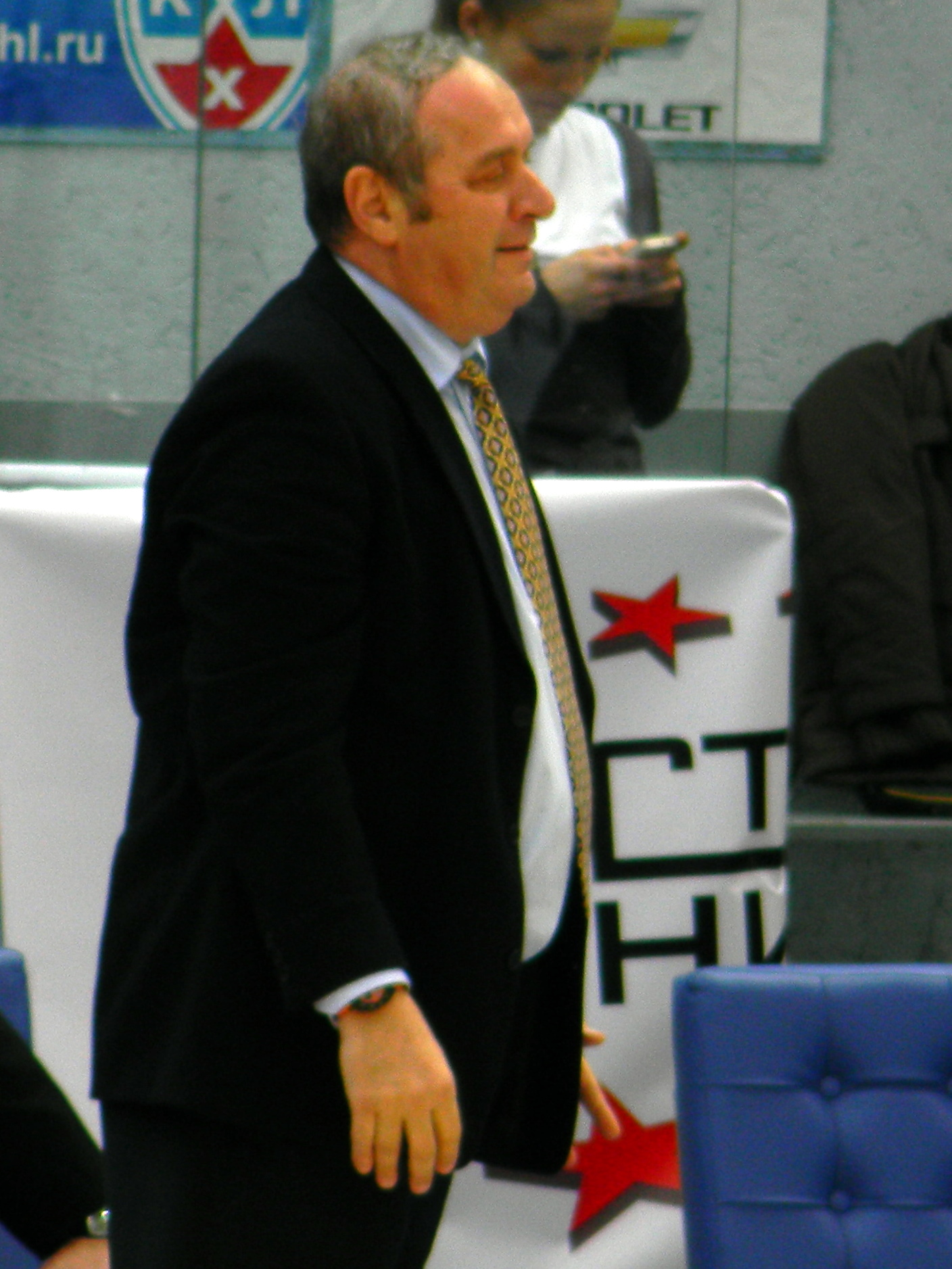
Zvi Sherf, head coach of the team (1992–93)

The most memorable game between Aris and PAOK was the third playoff game between the two teams in 1991. Aris had a two-game lead, after winning the first two games of the series, but PAOK managed to even the score with two victories in the first two playoff games, so, naturally, they had the momentum going into the fifth game of the best-of-seven series. PAOK was up by four points, almost 10 seconds before the end of that fifth game. Aris's Panagiotis Giannakis scored a quick two-point basket, reducing the deficit to two points. A sloppy in-bounds pass from PAOK was then stolen by Aris' Dinos Angelidis, who then passed the ball to Nikos Galis, who (while being guarded by a frenzied John Korfas) started to penetrate, but then Galis passed the ball to Giannakis, who drilled a three-pointer at the buzzer. Aris went on to win the next playoff game, and thus win the 1991 Greek League championship.

==== 1992–93 FIBA European Cup Winners ====
In 1992, Aris won the Greek Cup, versus AEK. That Greek Cup Final marked Galis' last game with Aris. The player who almost by himself, had made basketball hugely popular in Greece, had won 8 Greek League championships and 6 Greek Cups with Aris, in 13 years.

President (Mitroudis), in cooperation with Steve Giatzoglou (the team's new head coach), decided to build the new team around Giannakis, instead of around Galis. Even though Roy Tarpley was signed by the team, and Aris was dominating at the start of the season, things eventually fell apart. Irresponsible team management, in conjunction with a lack of discipline, led to the team finishing in the 5th spot in the final standings of the Greek League. However, a surprise European-wide success came for the team, as Aris won the European 2nd-tier level FIBA European Cup, after beating Efes Pilsen, by a score of 48–50, in a very dramatic game, in which Aris won their first European-wide title.

=== Years of crisis and mismanagement (1993–2003) ===
With the departure of Michailides from the team's presidency in 1992, a long period of financial mismanagement of the club began, with the result that the club became indebted, and the team declined, especially in the Greek League.

With the exception of advancing to the semifinals of the FIBA European Cup of 1994, those two seasons (1993–94, 1994–95) were marked by players (Panagiotis Giannakis, Vangelis Vourtzoumis, Miroslav Pecarski, Vassilis Lipiridis, and Michail Misunov) filing lawsuits against the team, for not receiving their salaries and bonus incentives. Repeated wrong choices of foreign players, changing of coaches, as well as inept management by the ownership, were the highlights, rather than success on the court. Well-known Terry Catledge fled the team, Sam Vincent and Sean Higgins were released, while other inappropriate player choices, such as Anthony Frederick and Chris King were made. Despite all of this, the usual support of the fans, combined with the rise of some Greek players (Dinos Angelidis and Panagiotis Liadelis) supported Aris, and the team managed to qualify for the Korać Cup of the next year.

==== 1996–97 FIBA Korać Cup Winners ====
The 1995–96 season can be considered as a messenger of a change in Aris' fate. With Soulis Markopoulos as the team's head coach, Aris played disciplined basketball, with emphasis on defense. Panagiotis Liadelis and Dinos Angelidis, along with Harold Ellis, started to draw the crowds back into Alexandreio Melathron. That Aris team beat their arch-rivals PAOK, once during the Greek League regular season, while also advancing to a 4-team group in the European-wide FIBA Korać Cup, where they almost got first place in their group.

The team's main sponsor, Zafiris Samoladas, spent heavily, and revitalized the team. José Ortíz, Charles Shackleford, Tzanis Stavrakopoulos, Floros, Mario Boni, Papadatos, and Cholopoulos joined the team, which, all of a sudden, appeared to be strong at every position. The team started well, by beating PAOK and Panathinaikos, but faltered against Olympiacos, both in the Greek League championship, and for the Greek Cup, losing both games in Thessaloniki, and prompting the firing of Markopoulos.

Subotić, one of the team's three key players from the 1987–1992 era, took over as head coach, and produced some satisfactory results, but Aris still displayed a lot of the disadvantages of a newly formed team. Aris, though, had a spectacular run to the Korać Cup title, Beşiktaş of the Turkish League, Beobanka of the Yugoslavian League, Nikas Peristeri of the Greek League, and Benetton Treviso of the Italian League, were all eliminated by Aris during the competition with the overtime return leg game in Italy reminding many of the old glory days of Aris in Europe.

The FIBA Korać Cup Final was against Tofaş of the Turkish League. Aris lost by 11 points in the first game in Thessaloniki. Aris won the return game in Bursa by 18 points (70–88).

Panagiotis Liadelis, Dinos Angelidis, Giannis Sioutis, and the other Greek players, lifted the Korać Cup inside the Turkish arena. This proved to have been their high point in the season. Aris returned to the Greek League games, losing three games against opponents Panionios, Papagou, and Peiraikos.

In the 1997–98 season, which was yet to start, Aris was sort of an enigma. Having retained all but one (Charles Shackleford) of its main players, and having signed Žarko Paspalj, Tiit Sokk, and Nasos Galakteros, the talent was still there, although rebounding problems were sure to appear. The hiring of Efthimis Kioumourtzoglou as head coach was viewed skeptically by many, as he was regarded as an old-fashioned coach who employed aged and predictable tactics for his teams' play. Samoladas had stepped down from the team's sponsor position, and the team still did not have a wealthy sponsor, or a certain source of revenue to pay for the players' high salaries. Qualification for the EuroLeague was critical that season, but not many of Aris' fans believed it was a realistic goal, as Olympiacos, AEK, and Panathinaikos seemed to be way ahead in terms of personnel and financial status. Still, miracles can happen.

==== A miracle ====
José Ortíz left in mid-January 1998, due to the fact that the team didn't have the money to pay him. Tiit Sokk followed him on his way out as well. The leadership of Lefteris Hatzopoulos ended, Efthimis Kioumourtzoglou was no longer the team's head coach. Within two weeks, they beat all of the considered to be big teams of Greece, (Olympiacos, PAOK, Panathinaikos, and AEK), beating the last two in the Final Four of the Greek Cup, and they became winners of the 1997–98 Greek Cup. Mario Boni was about to leave the team too, before the Greek Cup Final Four, but he stayed because he loved the team and its fans, and he helped the team a lot in this effort. Then he moved on to join Aeroporti di Roma Virtus, as he couldn't stand it anymore either. Aris continued with just 8 players thereafter in the season. Nonetheless, the downfall of Aris continued during the next years.

== Recent history ==
=== 2003–14 ===
In 2003, the old Aris BC company was dissolved, due to the large amount of debts that it owed, and a new K.A.E. (basketball club) was created. A group of local businessmen from Thessaloniki, through the "Genesis Association", decided to take the majority stake.

==== 2002–03 season ====
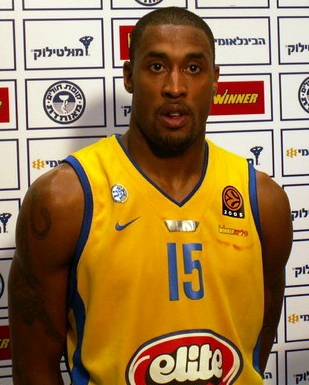
Will Solomon

In October 2002, Aris defeated Peristeri in the round of sixteen of the Greek Cup, advancing to the Greek Cup Final Four for the first time since 1999. That season, the club also competed in the FIBA EuroCup Challenge. The squad included Will Solomon, Ryan Stack, Fedor Likholitov, Miroslav Raičević, and Ivan Grgat.

However, the first attempt to regain the title of the Greek Cup was unsuccessful. The final four of the competition, held in Larissa, was the great rendezvous for all Aris fans around Greece. There were 3,500 crazy Aris fans in the sold out 5,500 capacity stadium of Larissa Neapolis Arena, and they did their best to support the team, in order to win the first Aris BC title since 1998. In the semifinal, Aris came back from a −24-point deficit, and finally beat Makedonikos by a score of 92–86. Aris proceeded on to the Greek Cup Final against rival Panathinaikos, whose task was much easier, as they had only needed to overcome Irakleio in the other semifinal.

The Greek Cup Final, held the next day, was a very tight and competitive game, but at the end, some critical and partial decisions of the referees in favor of Panathinaikos, as well as the fatigue of Aris' players from the previous day's semifinal, were the decisive factors that gave Panathinaikos the title. However, Aris' fans renewed their rendezvous for the upcoming final four of FIBA Europe Champions Cup, that was going to take place in Alexandreio, at Thessaloniki.

==== 2002–03 FIBA EuroCup Challenge Winners ====
In front of 6,000 fans, that filled the Alexandreio Melathron stadium, as early as two hours before the starting jump-ball, Aris hosted KK Hemofarm of the Serbian League, for the semifinal game of the competition, on 2 May 2003. Aris was very nervous and needed a sudden wake-up in the second half, to overcome the difficulties of the game, and overcome the Serbian opponents. Aris was back in a European final. After six difficult and unbearable years. Now, there was only one game left to win a championship. The game would be against Prokom Trefl Sopot of the Polish League. Aris' fans were again ready at their positions, and created a unique atmosphere that remained the trademark of the competition. So on 5 May 2003, Aris and Prokom battled for the title. The game was almost the same as the previous one for Aris, and although a second-halftime wake-up call gave the impression that Aris had won the game, Prokom made an unexpected comeback, and was in the lead, 83–81, after a successful three-point shot by Darius Maskoliūnas, with only six seconds left in the game. At that time, the "ghost" of "the Empire", the one that "led" Aris to its great seven-year reign during the late 1980s, appeared once again in the Alexandreio Melathron. Will Solomon drew a foul for Aris, against Prokom. He made the first free throw, then missed the second free throw, but Miroslav Raičević grabbed the rebound, and put the ball in the basket, and Aris won the game at the very end, by a score of 84–83.

==== 2003–04 season ====
The beginning of the 2003–04 season found Aris as a nomad inside its own city. Alexandreio Melathron was closed down, in order to get renovated for the 2004 Olympic Games, and Aris was obliged to play its home games in the 2,443 seat Ivanofeio Sports Arena, the home court of Iraklis. The season tickets were sold-out, and available tickets for each game were out of sight at each occasion. The constant packed atmosphere helped to lead Aris to great moments.

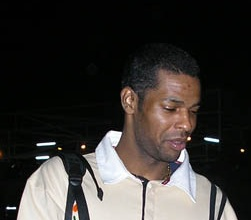
Nestoras Kommatos, top scorer of the 2003–04 Greek Basket League season

Aris was lucky enough that season to have probably its strongest team in a decade, as the club had well-known players that season like: Smush Parker, Toby Bailey, Nestoras Kommatos, Ryan Stack, Fedor Likholitov, and Miroslav Raičević. Aris eliminated Iraklis during the Greek Cup, and proceeded to the Greek Cup Final Four, for the second consecutive season. The Cup's Final Four that year was held at Lamia Indoor Hall Chalkiopoulio, in March.

2,600 Aris fans cheered the team on, as they overcame Apollon Patras in the Cup semifinal game, and proceeded to the final game against rival Olympiacos. During the Cup final game against Olympiacos, some Olympiacos fans acted out with some serious violent behavior, throwing fire rockets into the stands, where the Aris fans were seated and both teams' fans were subsequently forced by the referees to evacuate the arena. Because of the delay caused by this, the game lasted more than 4 hours.

The game continued after the fans were escorted out. Aris' players were able to remain concentrated on the game, and were able to pull out the victory, by a score of 73–70, giving the club its 8th Greek Cup title. The Aris fans that had evacuated the stadium, had remained in their cars to listen to the radio broadcast of the game, and had also gathered at roadside cafes and bars, in order to be able watch the rest of the game on television.

After the victory, the fans rushed out onto the streets, to celebrate, and were soon joined by the team itself in the street celebration, that eventually formed into a celebration convoy that headed back to Thessaloniki. At Thessaloniki, Aris' supporters gathered at the White Tower of Thessaloniki, which is the symbol of the city. The team's players climbed up to the top of the White Tower, to watch the crowd below them and to celebrate with them.

On the other hand, though, that same season, Aris was eliminated in the FIBA EuroCup by fellow Greek League club Maroussi, and its rising star player, Vassilis Spanoulis. Aris lost the best of 3 games series, 2 games to 1, in the final eight round versus Maroussi. That same season, Aris was eliminated in the Greek Basketball League playoffs by AEK Athens, who managed to beat Aris at Ivanofeio in the quarterfinals. The Greek League playoff loss to AEK knocked Aris out of a EuroLeague position for the next season.

==== 2004–05 season ====
In the next season, Aris returned to its home arena, the newly renovated Alexandreio. Aris changed almost its entire squad that year, and added the young and talented player Sofoklis Schortsanitis. In October, Aris drew a bracket match up to play against Makedonikos in the Greek Cup semifinals. That season, there was no Final Four system, and the semifinal match up was a two-game series, rather than a single-elimination game.

Aris had to play its "home" game in the match up at the Larissa Neapolis Arena, instead of at Alexandreio Melathron, as a punishment for what had happened at the previous Greek Cup final game against Olympiacos, where the fans of both clubs had gotten out of control. Aris lost the game in Larissa, the first in the 2-game series, 73–74. The second game was held in Kozani, at Makedonikos' home.

Makedonikos decided to make tickets for the game unavailable to Aris supporters. Nonetheless, about 500 Aris fans went to Kozani, and were able to secure tickets. They cheered the club on, as it won the second game, by a score of 89–78, and Aris advanced to the Greek Cup final game, as it had outscored Makedonikos by 10 points over the two games, and thus won the tie breaker. Aris had to play the EuroLeague powerhouse Panathinaikos in the final.

The Cup final took place at Irakleio, on Crete, and the Hellenic Basketball Federation decided not to allow any tickets to the game to be sold to the fans of the two teams, but instead only to the local people of the Irakleio area. However, about 150 Aris fans were able to manage their way into the arena, to help support the club. The Cup final was a tough and hard-fought game. Aris played well, but lost to Panathinaikos, by a 72–68 margin. The Aris players complained during the game (fairly in all of the cases), about the refereeing.

That same season Aris participated in a ULEB competition for the first time, as it was a part of the ULEB Cup (now called EuroCup) that year. The club's goal was of course to win the ULEB Cup, so that the team would secure a berth in the EuroLeague competition the following season. Aris proceeded to the Top-16 round of the ULEB Cup, where it was matched up against Lietuvos Rytas of the Baltic League (Lietuvos Rytas would be the team that would eventually go on to win the ULEB Cup championship) in a two-game series.

Aris split the two games with Lietuvos rytas, but lost the series on the points aggregate differential of −2 points. That same season, Aris was also eliminated from the Greek League without taking home the national championship. The club was eliminated in a fashion that, was at the time, the worst possible scenario for both the team's players and fans, as Aris lost in the playoffs once again to AEK Athens. But what made the loss even more painful, was that AEK managed to secure the clinching series victory at Aris' home arena, the Alexandreio Melathron.

==== 2005–06 season ====
Aris finished the regular season of the Greek Basketball League in 4th place, with a 15–11 win–loss record. Aris lost to Panathinikos during the play-off semifinals, and had to face Maroussi in a best-of-five series, for third place. With the series tied at 2–2, Aris went on to beat Maroussi, 59–63, in a dramatic game 5 in Athens. This earned Aris a return to the EuroLeague, after a 14-year absence, to the delight of its fans.

Although Aris was eliminated from the Greek Cup, they managed to reach the ULEB Cup (now called EuroCup) final game, which was held at the Spiroudome in Charleroi, Belgium. Aris proceeded from the group phase to the Top 16 stage, where the team eliminated fellow Greek club Panionios, in a two-game series. Aris won the first game in the series, by a score of 72–70, in Athens. In the second game at Alexandreio, Aris defeated Panionios, 112–105, in double overtime. Aris then eliminated the French Pro A League club ASVEL, with two victories, by scores of 67–60 and 77–67.

In the semifinals, Aris then faced Hemofarm, in a repeat of the semifinal of the 2003 Champion's Cup. Aris lost by a score of 74–71, in the game in Serbia, and needed a late victory in the game in Thessaloniki to make it to the final against Dynamo Moscow. On 11 April, Dynamo Moscow defeated Aris, 73–60, in the final, and won the ULEB Cup (EuroCup) championship.

==== 2006–07 season ====
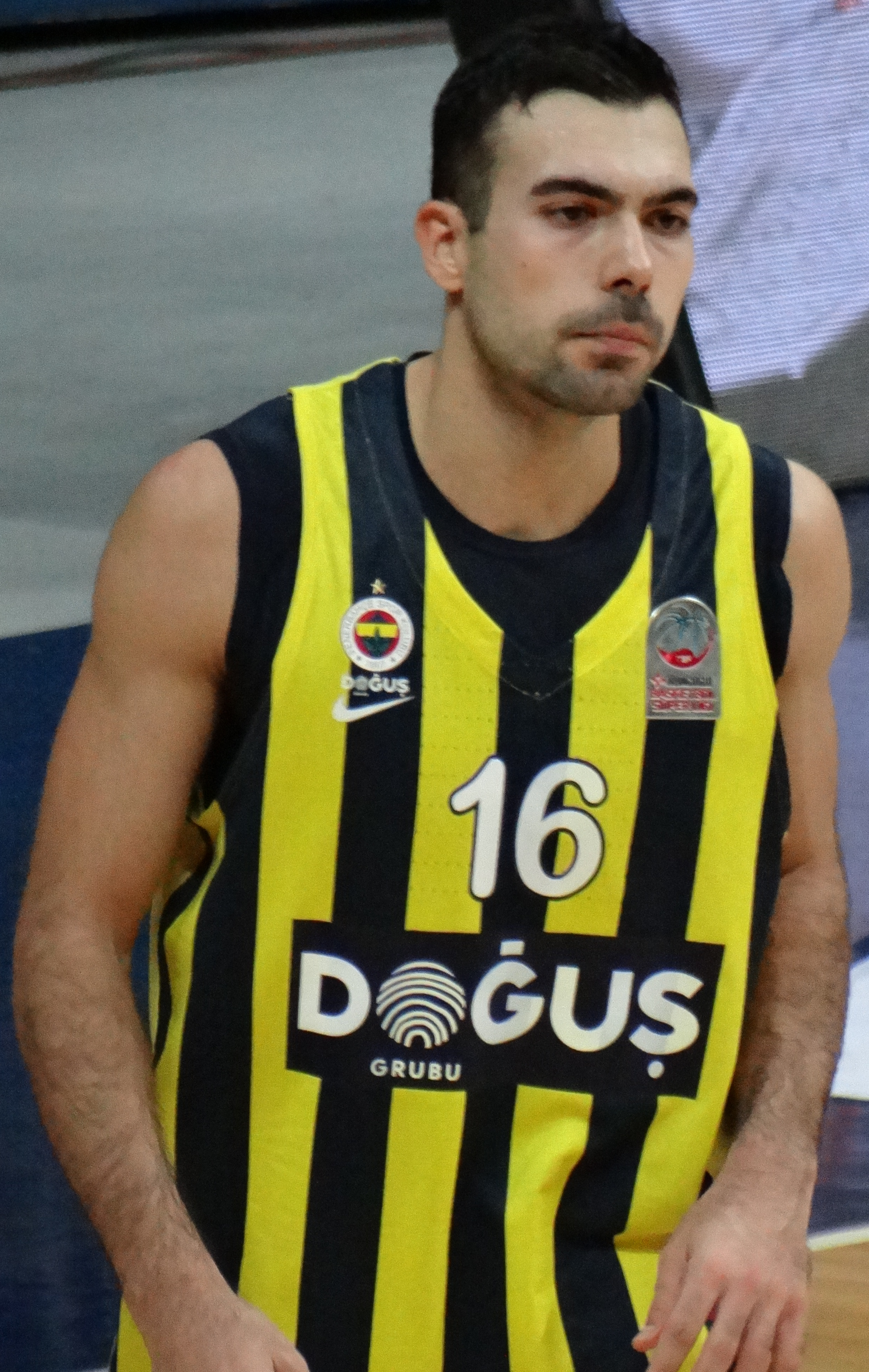
Kostas Sloukas

Aris performed outstandingly during the 2006–07 season of the Greek Basketball League, finishing the regular season in second place, with a 21–5 win–loss record. Although this gave Aris a home court-advantage in the Best-of-five playoff semifinal against Olympiacos, Aris lost game five by a score of 75–83, and had to face Panionios in the 3rd place series, and a chance at a renewed EuroLeague berth. Aris defeated Panionios 73–60 in game five, securing their second consecutive EuroLeague appearance.

The 2006–07 season also marked the return of Aris to the EuroLeague, for the first time since the 1991–92 season, a 15-year absence. Aris was placed in Group C, along with CSKA Moscow, FC Barcelona, Benetton Treviso, Pau Orthez, Eldo Napoli, Fenerbahçe, and Žalgiris Kaunas. With a 6–8 win–loss record, Aris managed to clinch 5th place in the group, and thus qualify to the Top 16. Aris was then placed in Group D, alongside Unicaja Málaga, Dynamo Moscow, and Benetton Treviso. Aris was eliminated from the competition, only managing a 1–5 win–loss record in the Top 16, and finishing at the bottom of the group.

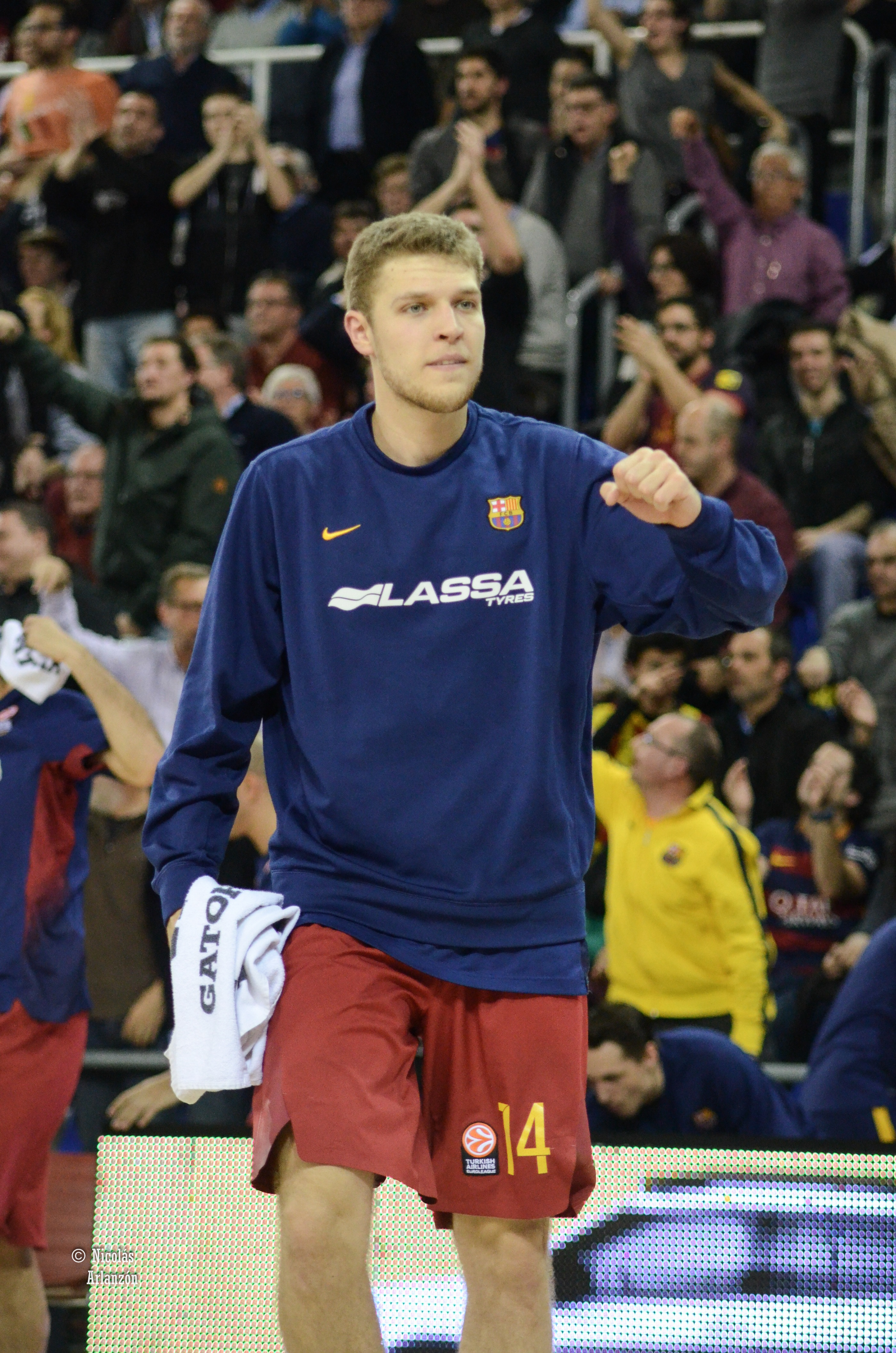
Sasha Vezenkov

==== 2007–14 ====
During the following years of this era, Aris continued to have only moderate success. Their best season was in 2010–11, when they finished in fourth place in the Greek League. During these years, the club continued to promote young talented players, such as Kostas Papanikolaou, Kostas Sloukas, Aleksandar Vezenkov, and others.

=== 2015 ===
In 2015, a new era started for the club, as Nikolaos Laskaris became the club's new major shareholder. With head coach Dimitris Priftis, and new players in the team, Aris B.C. once again began aspiring to be competitive, with the goal to either return to the EuroLeague, or have success in the FIBA Champions League, during the upcoming years.

=== 2025 ===
Aris B.C. entered a new era with the acquisition of a majority stake by the investement fund of Richard Hsiao in June 2025.

On 26 September 2025, Aris announced Igor Milicic as its new coach.

== Roster ==
Note: Flags indicate national team eligibility at FIBA-sanctioned events. Players may hold other non-FIBA nationalities not displayed.

Aris Thessaloniki roster
Players
Coaches

Pos.	No.	Nat.	Name	Ht.	Wt.	Age
G	0	(Canada) (Greece)	Mitrou-Long, Elijah	1.87 m (6 ft 2 in)	84 kg (185 lb)	29 – 15 December 1996
G	1	(Greece)	Chatzilamprou, Chrysostomos	1.98 m (6 ft 6 in)		18 – 12 July 2008
F/C	3	(United States)	Robinson-Earl, Jeremiah	2.06 m (6 ft 9 in)	109 kg (240 lb)	26 – 3 November 2000
G	4	(Greece)	Toliopoulos, Vassilis	1.88 m (6 ft 2 in)	79 kg (174 lb)	30 – 15 June 1996
PG	7	(North Macedonia)	Dimitrijević, Nenad	1.90 m (6 ft 3 in)	79 kg (174 lb)	28 – 23 February 1998
G	11	(Greece)	Poulianitis, Stelios	1.90 m (6 ft 3 in)	91 kg (201 lb)	31 – 3 April 1995
G/F	13	(Greece)	Bochoridis, Lefteris (C)	1.96 m (6 ft 5 in)	91 kg (201 lb)	32 – 18 April 1994
PG	24	(Serbia)	Jović, Stefan	1.98 m (6 ft 6 in)	94 kg (207 lb)	36 – 3 November 1990
G	30	(United States)	Morgan, Matt	1.93 m (6 ft 4 in)	84 kg (185 lb)	29 – 7 November 1997
F	32	(United States)	Liddell, E. J.	1.98 m (6 ft 6 in)	109 kg (240 lb)	25 – 18 December 2000
SF	33	(Greece)	Charalampopoulos, Vassilis	2.04 m (6 ft 8 in)	109 kg (240 lb)	29 – 6 January 1997
C	37	(Greece)	Antetokounmpo, Kostas	2.08 m (6 ft 10 in)	91 kg (201 lb)	28 – 20 November 1997
F	43	(Greece)	Antetokounmpo, Thanasis	2.01 m (6 ft 7 in)	99 kg (218 lb)	34 – 18 July 1992
F/C	50	(Greece)	Tanoulis, Georgios	2.10 m (6 ft 11 in)	105 kg (231 lb)	24 – 27 July 2002
C	92	(Canada)	Birch, Khem	2.06 m (6 ft 9 in)	106 kg (234 lb)	34 – 28 September 1992
G/F	95	(France)	Mokoka, Adam	1.96 m (6 ft 5 in)	86 kg (190 lb)	28 – 18 July 1998

Head coach

- (Greece) Vassilis Spanoulis

Assistant coach(es)

- (Greece) Ilias Kantzouris
- (Greece) Kostas Charalampidis
- (Greece) Kostas Iliadis
- (Greece) Christos Chasanidis

Athletic trainer(s)

- (Greece) Panagiotis Zaloggos
- (Greece) Konstantinos Donos

Doctor(s)

- (Greece) Nikolaos Koukoulias

Physiotherapist(s)

- (Greece) Tolis Karatzas
- (Greece) Panagiotis Boutovinos
- (Greece) Charilaos Glaros
- (Greece) Thodoros Alexiadis

Team manager

- (Greece) Christos Tapoutos
- (Greece) Dimitris Apostolou
- (Greece) Nikos Tzoras

Legend

- (C) Team captain
- Injured

- Roster
Updated: 13 September 2026

=== Depth chart ===
Pos.	Starting 5	Bench 1	Bench 2	Bench 3
C	Khem Birch	Kostas Antetokounmpo		Giorgos Tanoulis
PF	Jeremiah Robinson-Earl	E. J. Liddell	Thanasis Antetokounmpo
SF	Adam Mokoka	Lefteris Bochoridis		Vassilis Charalampopoulos
SG	Matt Morgan	Elijah Mitrou-Long	Chrysostomos Chatzilamprou	Stelios Poulianitis
PG	Nenad Dimitrijević	Vassilis Toliopoulos		Stefan Jović

=== Retired numbers ===
Aris B.C. retired numbers
No	Nat.	Player	Position	Tenure	Date Retired
6	(Greece)	Nikos Galis	SG	1979–1992	May 2013

== Honours ==
=== Domestic competitions ===
- Greek League

Winners (10): 1929–30, 1978–79, 1982–83, 1984–85, 1985–86, 1986–87, 1987–88, 1988–89, 1989–90, 1990–91
Runners-up (8): 1928–29, 1957–58, 1958–59, 1964–65, 1965–66, 1975–76, 1981–82, 1983–84

- Greek Cup

Winners (8): 1984–85, 1986–87, 1987–88, 1988–89, 1989–90, 1991–92, 1997–98, 2003–04
Runners-up (6): 1983–84, 1992–93, 2002–03, 2004–05, 2013–14, 2016–17

- Greek Super Cup

Winners (1): 1986

=== European competitions ===
- EuroLeague

Semifinalist / Final Four (3): 1988, 1989, 1990

- FIBA Saporta Cup

Winners (1): 1992–93
Semifinalist (2): 1993–94, 1998–99

- EuroCup Basketball

Runners-up (1): 2005–06

- FIBA Korać Cup

Winners (1): 1996–97
Semifinalist (1): 1984–85

- FIBA EuroCup Challenge

Winners (1): 2002–03

=== Regional ===
- Thessaloniki Championship

Winners (6): 1925–26, 1926–27, 1927–28, 1928–29, 1929–30, 1957–58

=== Other ===
- Sofia, Bulgaria Invitational Game

Winners (1): 2007

- Pescara, Italy Invitational Game

Winners (1): 2007

== Individual honours ==
Basketball Hall of Fame

- Nikos Galis

FIBA Hall of Fame

- Nikos Galis
- José Ortiz
- Panagiotis Giannakis

50 Greatest EuroLeague Contributors

- Nikos Galis
- Panagiotis Giannakis
- Dušan Ivković

Mr. Europa

- Nikos Galis (1987)

Euroscar Award

- Nikos Galis (1987)

EuroLeague Top Scorer

- Nikos Galis (1991–92)

Greek League Top Scorer

- Charis Papageorgiou (1975–76, 1978–79)
- Nikos Galis (1980–81, 1981–82, 1982–83, 1983–84, 1984–85, 1985–86, 1986–87, 1987–88, 1988–89, 1989–90, 1990–91)
- Nestoras Kommatos (2003–04)
- Sasha Vezenkov (2014–15)
- Will Cummings (2016–17)
- Anthony Cowan Jr. (2021–22)

Greek League Best Young Player

- Dimitrios Tsaldaris (2005–06)
- Kostas Papanikolaou (2008–09)
- Kostas Sloukas (2010–11)
- Sasha Vezenkov (2012–13, 2013–14, 2014–15)
- Omiros Netzipoglou (2021–22)

Greek League MVP

- Nikos Galis (1987–88, 1988–89, 1989–90, 1990–91, 1991–92)
- Sasha Vezenkov (2014–15)

Greek League Finals MVP

- Nikos Galis (1986–87, 1987–88, 1988–89, 1989–90, 1990–91)

Greek League Top Rebounder

- Roy Tarpley (1992–93)

Greek League Assist Leader

- Panagiotis Giannakis (1988–89)
- Nikos Galis (1990–91, 1991–92)

Greek League Coach of the Year

- Dimitris Priftis (2015–16)

Greek Cup Finals MVP

- Panagiotis Liadelis (1997–98)
- Nestoras Kommatos (2003–04)

== Records and statistics ==
=== Greek League records ===
Outline	Record
Champion without a loss in a row	3 times (1985–86, 1986–87, 1987–88)
Best regular season record	26–0 (1985–86)
Record win	153–62 (vs Near East, 1985–86)
Longest sequence of wins	80 (1984–85 – 1988–89)
Biggest win in A1 Finals	129–81 (48 points) against Panionios (1986–87)

=== Sponsors and Manufacturers ===
Since 1980 Aris had a specific kit manufacturer and a kit sponsor. The following tables detail the shirt sponsors and kit suppliers of Aris by year:

Period	Kit supplier	Shirt sponsor
1980–1981	adidas	None
1981–1982	asics	Mpezas
1982–1984	asics	Sato
1984–1985	asics	Stimorol
1985–1989	asics	Sato
1989–1990	asics	National Bank of Greece
1990–1991	asics	ATEbank
1991–1992	asics	Coplam
1992–1994	adidas	Sato
1994–1995	adidas	Intersalonika
1995–1996	adidas	Moda Bagno
1996–1997	adidas	None
1997–1998	adidas	Moda Bagno
1998–1999	adidas	Macmilan
1999–2003	adidas	?
2003–2005	adidas	Egnatia Bank
2005–2008	adidas	TT Bank
2008–2010	adidas	Dmiss Group
2010–2011	Reebok	Dmiss Group
2011–2012	Spalding	OPAP
2012–2014	Nickan	OPAP
2014–2015	Macron	Dmiss Group
2015–2017	NG 6	Global Swiss Trade
2017–2026	Crossover	Betsson
2026-current	Puma	Betsson

== Current Sponsorships ==
- Great Shirt Sponsor: Betsson
- Official Sport Clothing Manufacturer: Crossover

== Crest evolution ==
Older

2014-2025

2025-2026

== Arena ==
fpAris' long-time home court is the Alexandreio Melathron, with its main hall being named "Nick Galis Hall" in 2013, in honour of the legendary former Aris player Nikos Galis. The venue was completed in 1966, and it was renovated for the 2004 Summer Olympics. The arena has a seating capacity of 6,014 people.

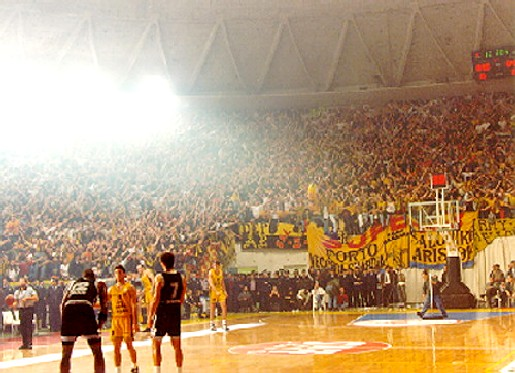
Fans of Aris in the arena

Aris against Olympiacos basketball game (2007)

== Nick Galis Cup ==
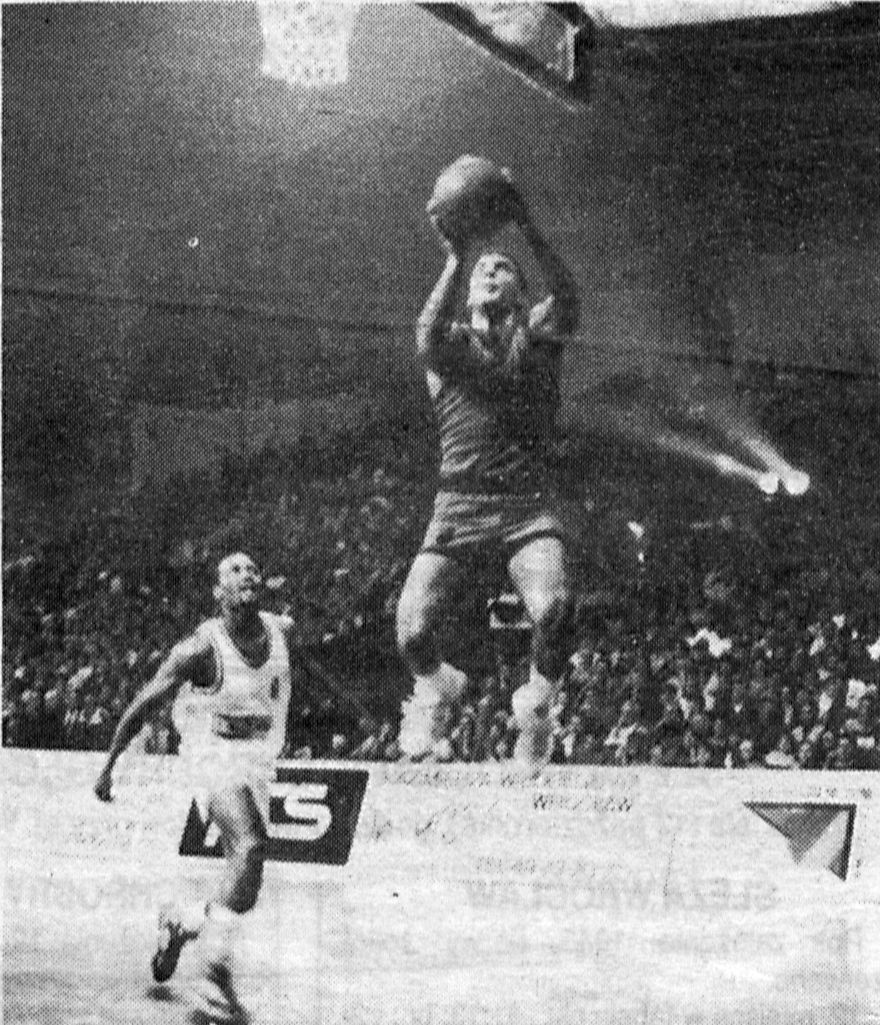
Nikos Galis

Since 2014, Aris B.C. organizes every year, in the start of the season, a friendly mini-tournament in honour of Nikos Galis.

Year	Final			Third and Fourth place		
Year	First Place	Score	Second Place	Third Place	Score	Fourth Place
2014	(Greece); Aris	60–59	(Russia); CSKA Moscow	(Turkey); Banvit	77–74	(Greece); Panathinaikos
2015	(Turkey); Pınar Karşıyaka	84–74	(Greece); Aris	(Russia); Lokomotiv Kuban	72–50	(Slovenia); Union Olimpija

== Top performances in European & Worldwide competitions ==
Season	Achievement	Notes
EuroLeague
1987–88	Final Four	4th place in Ghent, lost to Tracer Milano 82–87 in the semi-final, lost to Partizan 93–105 in the 3rd place game
1988–89	Final Four	3rd place in Munich, lost to Maccabi Tel Aviv 86–99 in the semi-final, defeated FC Barcelona 88–71 in the 3rd place game
1989–90	Final Four	4th place in Zaragoza, lost to FC Barcelona Banca Catalana 83–104 in the semi-final, lost to Limoges CSP 91–103 in the 3rd place game
1990–91	Quarter-finals	5th place in a group with FC Barcelona Banca Catalana, Pop 84, Scavolini Pesaro, Maccabi Tel Aviv, Bayer 04 Leverkusen, Kingston Kings and Limoges CSP
FIBA Saporta Cup
1992–93	Champions	defeated Efes Pilsen 50–48 in the final of the FIBA European Cup in Turin
1993–94	Semi-finals	eliminated 2–1 by Smelt Olimpija, 83–79 (W) in Thessaloniki, 78–84 (L) and 61–74 (L) in Ljubljana
1998–99	Semi-finals	eliminated by Pamesa Valencia, 64–70 (L) in Valencia and 50–58 (L) in Thessaloniki
FIBA Korać Cup
1984–85	Semi-finals	eliminated by Ciaocrem Varese, 80–77 (W) in Thessaloniki and 71–95 (L) in Varese
1996–97	Champions	defeated Tofaş, 66–77 (L) in Thessaloniki and 88–70 (W) in Bursa in the double finals of Korać Cup
1997–98	Quarter-finals	eliminated by Calze Pompea Roma, 79–80 (L) in Thessaloniki and 79–86 (L) in Rome
EuroCup
2005–06	Final	lost to Dynamo Moscow 60–73 in the final (Charleroi)
2009–10	Quarter-finals	eliminated by Power Electronics Valencia, 64–71 (L) in Thessaloniki and 67–85 (L) in Valencia
EuroChallenge
2003–04	Quarter-finals	eliminated 2–1 by TIM Maroussi, 76–85 (L) in Athens, 101–93 (W) in Thessaloniki and 90–99 (L) in Athens
EuroCup Challenge
2002–03	Champions	defeated Prokom Trefl Sopot 84–83 in the final of the FIBA EuroCup Challenge in Thessaloniki

== The road to the three European Cup victories ==
=== 1992–93 FIBA European Cup ===
Round	Team	Home	Away
1st	Bye		
2nd	(Belarus) Dinamo Minsk	107–70	117–59
3rd	(Poland) Śląsk Wrocław	102–75	90–80
Top 12	(Israel) Hapoel Galil Elyon	88–75	69–80
Top 12	(France) Pitch Cholet	104–72	70–60
Top 12	(Portugal) Benfica	83–72	75–67
Top 12	(Croatia) Slobodna Dalmacija	89–56	76–66
Top 12	(Ukraine) Budivelnyk	67–61	94–80
SF	(Spain) NatWest Zaragoza	82–66	86–84
F	(Turkey) Efes Pilsen	50–48	

=== 1996–97 FIBA Korać Cup ===
Round	Team	Home	Away
Pre.	Bye		
1st	(Czech Republic) USK Erpet Praha	77–65	90–88
1st	(Slovenia) Satex Maribor	77–55	75–70
1st	(Croatia) Olimpija Slavoning	74–67	74–71
2nd	(Turkey) Beşiktaş	77–64	65–64
3rd	(Federal Republic of Yugoslavia) Beobanka	80–68	61–70
QF	(Greece) Nikas Peristeri	75–65	64–71
SF	(Italy) Benetton Treviso	77–73	86–87
F	(Turkey) Tofaş	66–77	88–70

=== 2002–03 FIBA Europe Champions Cup ===
Round	Team	Home	Away
1st	(Israel) Bnei HaSharon	75–78	101–92
1st	(Greece) Maroussi	87–78	78–90
1st	(Cyprus) Keravnos	83–67	69–61
1st	(Croatia) Split CO	111–88	97–79
F4	(Greece) Peristeri	86–84	
F4	(Bulgaria) Lukoil Academic	80–81	
2nd	(France) SIG	93–87	83–103
2nd	(Russia) Khimki	83–80	79–75
2nd	(Israel) Hapoel Tel Aviv	96–84	71–75
QF	(Bulgaria) Lukoil Academic	91–73	67–77
SF	(Serbia and Montenegro) Hemofarm	73–66	
F	(Poland) Prokom Trefl Sopot	84–83	

== The road to the Great European Journeys ==
=== 1987–88 FIBA European Champions Cup ===
Round	Team	Home	Away
1st	(Switzerland) Pully	113–104	127–125
QF	(France) Orthez	92–86	81–97
QF	(Spain) FC Barcelona	93–107	89–88
QF	(Israel) Maccabi Tel Aviv	93–77	91–95
QF	(West Germany) Saturn Köln	107–101	100–98
QF	(Socialist Federal Republic of Yugoslavia) Partizan	96–87	94–101
QF	(Netherlands) Nashua EBBC	120–99	87–88
QF	(Italy) Tracer Milano	120–95	82–97
F4	(Italy) Tracer Milano	82–87	
F4	(Socialist Federal Republic of Yugoslavia) Partizan	93–105	

=== 1988–89 FIBA European Champions Cup ===
Round	Team	Home	Away
1st	(Cyprus) AEL	115–67	115–75
2nd	(Sweden) Södertälje	105–82	85–93
QF	(Netherlands) Nashua EBBC	116–83	90–85
QF	(Spain) FC Barcelona	90–84	81–97
QF	(Israel) Maccabi Tel Aviv	90–102	77–97
QF	(Soviet Union) CSKA Moscow	89–83	100–88
QF	(Socialist Federal Republic of Yugoslavia) Jugoplastika	96–85	83–94
QF	(France) Limoges CSP	80–77	106–115
QF	(Italy) Scavolini Pesaro	79–72	92–99
F4	(Israel) Maccabi Tel Aviv	86–99	
F4	(Spain) FC Barcelona	88–71	

=== 1989–90 FIBA European Champions Cup ===
Round	Team	Home	Away
1st	(Bulgaria) Balkan Botevgrad	119–88	107–91
QF	(Poland) Lech Poznań	116–92	103–78
QF	(Spain) FC Barcelona Banca Catalana	94–100	56–90
QF	(Italy) Philips Milano	95–77	92–100
QF	(France) Limoges CSP	89–79	84–94
QF	(Netherlands) Commodore Den Helder	110–102	99–72
QF	(Socialist Federal Republic of Yugoslavia) Jugoplastika	79–80	89–85
QF	(Israel) Maccabi Tel Aviv	98–81	92–94
F4	(Spain) FC Barcelona Banca Catalana	83–104	
F4	(France) Limoges CSP	91–103	

=== 2005–06 ULEB Cup ===
Round	Team	Home	Away
1st	(Germany) Alba Berlin	97–87	89–86
1st	(Belgium) Euphony Bree	81–74	64–69
1st	(Latvia) Ventspils	96–78	76–96
1st	(Spain) Adecco Estudiantes	73–69	89–76
1st	(Bulgaria) Lukoil Academic	97–91	65–66
Top 16	(Greece) Panionios	112–105	72–70
QF	(France) ASVEL	77–67	67–60
SF	(Serbia and Montenegro) Hemofarm	82–77	71–74
F	(Russia) Dynamo Moscow	60–73	

== Season-by-season ==
Season	Greek League	Greek Cup	Europe	Thessaloniki	Head coach	Roster
1925–26	No tournament	No tournament	No tournament	Champion		
1926–27	No tournament	No tournament	No tournament	Champion		Manolis Achelleos, Daniil Daneilan, Nahabet Exouzian, Onik Isujian, Parseh Kontaxian, Thodoros Stefanopoulos, Vartan Jamjian, Petros Fetsis
1927–28	3rd place	No tournament	No tournament	Champion		Armenian, Manolis Achelleos, Daniil Daneilan, Panagiotis Dimoudis, Panagiotis Iasonidis, Karampetian, Parseh Kontaxian, N. Marasian, Argyris Termentzis
1928–29	5th place	No tournament	No tournament	Champion		Manolis Achelleos, Daniil Daneilan, Panagiotis Dimoudis, Panagiotis Iasonidis, Patrik Benlian, Argyris Termentzis
1929–30	Champion	No tournament	No tournament	Champion		Manolis Achelleos, Daniil Daneilan, Panagiotis Dimoudis, Fotis Zografos, Panagiotis Iasonidis, Karatzas, Patrik Benlian, Papafotiou
1930–31	Not participated	No tournament	No tournament	3rd place		
1931–32	Not participated	No tournament	No tournament	Runner Up		
1932–33	Not participated	No tournament	No tournament	Runner Up		
1933–34	Not participated	No tournament	No tournament	Runner Up		
1934–35	Not participated	No tournament	No tournament	6th place		
1935–36	Not participated	No tournament	No tournament	4th place		
1936–37	Not participated	No tournament	No tournament	Not participated		
1937–38	No tournament	No tournament	No tournament	Not participated		
1938–39	Not participated	No tournament	No tournament	Not participated		
1939–40	Not participated	No tournament	No tournament	3rd place		Kostas Dimitriou, Charis Theocharidis, Kolias Karazisis, Takis Kurou, Petros Ladenis, Takis Nikolaidis, Christos Tsakiris, Mimis Charpidis, Menelaos Chatzigeorgiou, Hatzi
1945–46	Not participated	No tournament	No tournament	3rd place		Giorgos Vlasiadis, Vagelis Theodorou, Tilemahos Theodorou, Charis Theocharidis, Petros Ladenis, Petros Lekkas, Fedon Mattheou, Christos Tsakiris, Nikos Chatzinikolaou, Kostas Chatziparaskeuas, Nasos Chatzopoulos
1946–47	Not participated	No tournament	No tournament	3rd place		Giorgos Vlasiadis, Vagelis Theodorou, Tilemahos Theodorou, Charis Theocharidis, Petros Ladenis, Petros Lekkas, Fedon Mattheou, Vasilis Mpataras, Christos Tsakiris, Menelaos Chatzigeorgiou, Nasos Chatzopoulos
1947–48	No tournament	No tournament	No tournament	Runner Up		Kostas Vintsentzatos, Vagelis Theodorou, Tilemahos Theodorou, Koulaxidis, Petros Ladenis, Petros Lekkas, Fedon Mattheou, Vasilis Mpataras, Nikos Nikolaidis, Christos Tsakiris, Nikos Chatzinikolaou, Kostas Chatziparaskeuas, Nasos Chatzopoulos
1948–49	6th place	No tournament	No tournament	Runner Up		Kostas Vintsentzatos, Giorgos Vlasiadis, P. Vragkos, Panagiotis Gounaris, Vagelis Theodorou, Tilemahos Theodorou, Kostas Kazampampas, Kalogiannis, Dimitris Karthasiadis, Giorgs Karidas, Giorgos Lappas, Dimitris Leontidis, Fedon Mattheou, Giorgos Meimaridis, Vagelis Mikromastoras, Moscholios, Nikos Nikolaidis, Fedon Papasynnefakis, Giannis Papacharisis, Antonis Trakatellis, Christos Tsakiris, Antonis Flokas, Filippos Charisis, Nikos Chatzinikolaou, Kostas Chatziparaskeuas
1949–50	Not participated	No tournament	No tournament	5th place		Petros Vasilakos, Kostas Vintsentzatos, Giorgos Vlasiadis, Giorgos Gkioulmichalakis, Vagelis Theodorou, Kostas Kazampampas, Kalogiannis, Dimitris Karthasiadis, Giorgos Meimaridis, Nikos Nikolaidis, Christos Tsakiris, Antonis Flokas, Filippos Charisis, Nikos Chatzinikolaou, Kostas Chatziparaskeuas
1950–51	Not participated	No tournament	No tournament	5th place		Giorgos Vlasiadis, Giorgos Gkioulmichalakis, Kostas Thionusopoulos, Alekos Kalnteremtzidis, Giorgos Meimaridis, Takis Nikolaidis, Nikos Nikolaidis, Giorgos Papathanasiou, Stavros Tazedakis, Kostas Taliathoros, Antonis Flokas, Filippos Charisis, Kostas Chatziparaskeuas
1951–52	No tournament	No tournament	No tournament	4th place		Giorgos Gkioulmichalakis, Kostas Thevetzis, Nikos Thellios, Kostas Thionusopoulos, Alekos Kalnteremtzidis, Tasos Kortesis, Nikos Makris, Giorgos Meimaridis, Vagelis Mikromastoras, Giorgos Bousvaros, Nikos Nikolaidis, Giorgos Papathanasiou, Giannis Paraschos, Petros Petrakis, Polys Raptopoulos, Stavros Tazedakis, Kostas Taliathoros, Antonis Flokas, Filippos Charisis, Lakis Chatzigiannakis
1952–53	Not participated	No tournament	No tournament	3rd place	Anestis Petalidis	Sakis Thaskalou, Kostas Thevetzis, Nikos Thellios, Kostas Thionusopoulos, Tasos Kortesis, Nikos Makris, Giorgos Bousvaros, Giorgos Papathanasiou, Petros Petrakis, Polys Raptopoulos, Stavros Tazedakis, Kostas Taliathoros, Antonis Flokas, Filippos Charisis, Lakis Chatzigiannakis
1953–54	Not participated	No tournament	No tournament	3rd place	Anestis Petalidis	Kostas Devetzis, Tasos Kortesis, Grigoris Ladas, Nikos Makris, Thodoros Ballidis, Giorgos Bousvaros, Stergios Bousvaros, Lazaros Papadopoulos, Giorgos Papathanasiou, Petros Petrakis, Nikos Stagkos, Stavros Tazedakis, Kostas Taliathoros, Lakis Chatzigiannakis
1954–55	Not participated	No tournament	No tournament	6th place	Anestis Petalidis	Kostas Valaouris, Vasilis Vasiakostas, Stelios Gousios, Tasos Kortesis, Antonis Konstantaras, Grigoris Ladas, Nikos Makris, Thodoros Ballidis, Thanasis Bacharidis, Stergios Bousvaros, Lazaros Papadopoulos, Giorgos Papathanasiou, Petros Petrakis, Panagiotis Spyrou, Nikos Stagkos, Filippos Charisis, Lakis Chatzigiannakis
1955–56	No tournament	No tournament	No tournament	5th place	Anestis Petalidis	Epameinondas Anastasiadis, Dimitris Vlahopoulos, Stelios Gousios, Thomas Guikoas, Giannis Devetzis, Tasos Kortesis, Antonis Konstantaras, Christos Lolas, Nikos Makris, Thodoros Ballidis, Stergios Bousvaros, Manolis Papadakis, Antonis Papantonis, Petros Petrakis, Nikos Stagkos, Leuteris Tsaousis, Lakis Chatzigiannakis
1956–57	Not participated	No tournament	No tournament	3rd place	Anestis Petalidis	Epameinondas Anastasiadis, Alexis Vasileiadis, Stelios Gousios, Antonis Konstantaras, Christos Lolas, Nikos Makris, Thodoros Ballidis, Stergios Bousvaros, Manolis Papadakis, Nikos Papaioannou, Antonis Papantonis, Petros Petrakis, Nikos Stagkos, Leuteris Tsaousis, Lakis Chatzigiannakis
1957–58	Runner Up	No tournament	No tournament	Champion	Anestis Petalidis	Mikos Amarantidis, Stelios Gousios, Kostas Dionusopoulos, Giorgos Karamitsos, Antonis Konstantaras, Christos Lolas, Nikos Makris, Thodoros Ballidis, Stergios Bousvaros, Manolis Papadakis, Anestis Petalidis, Petros Petrakis, Kostas Skufalidis, Panagiotis Spiliakos, Antonis Flokas, Dimitris Fourountzopoulos
1958–59	Runner Up	No tournament	No tournament	Runner Up	Anestis Petalidis	Antonis Antonakis, Michalis Vagianos, Stelios Gousios, Kostas Dionusopoulos, Giorgos Karamitsos, Antonis Konstantaras, Christos Lolas, Nikos Makris, Pantelis Markakis, Thodoros Ballidis, Stergios Bousvaros, Manolis Papadakis, Nikos Papaioannou, Anestis Petalidis, Petros Petrakis, Panagiotis Spiliakos, Antonis Flokas, Dimitris Fourountzopoulos
1959–60	4th place	No tournament	No tournament	Runner Up	Anestis Petalidis	Antonis Antonakis, Michalis Vagianos, Stelios Gousios, Giorgos Karamitsos, Antonis Konstantaras, Christos Lolas, Nikos Makris, Giorgos Bousvaros, Stergios Bousvaros, Manolis Papadakis, Dimitris Rokkos, Josef Tsiggros, Giorgos Tsitouras, Antonis Flokas, Dimitris Fourountzopoulos
1960–61	4th place	No tournament	No tournament	Runner Up	Anestis Petalidis	Giorgos Anastasopoulos, Antonis Antonakis, Roulis Arguropoulos, Stelios Gousios, Giannis Ioannidis, Giorgos Karamitsos, Antonis Konstantaras, Christos Lolas, Nikos Makris, Kostas Metallidis, Giorgos Bousvaros, Stergios Bousvaros, Ntinos Palmas, Manolis Papadakis, Dimitris Rokkos, Leuteris Tsavdaroglou, Josef Tsiggros, Giorgos Tsitouras, Dimitris Fourountzopoulos, Leuteris Hatzopoulos
1961–62	Not participated	No tournament	No tournament	4th place	Anestis Petalidis	Giorgos Anastasopoulos, Antonis Antonakis, Michalis Vagianos, Giannis Ioannidis, Savvas Kalpidis, Giorgos Karamitsos, Themis Katrios, Antonis Konstantaras, Christos Lolas, Stergios Bousvaros, Ilias Panteliadis, Dimitris Pesmatzoglou, Stefanos Rammos, Giorgos Sountouridis, Giorgos Tsitouras, Leuteris Hatzopoulos
1962–63	5th place	No tournament	Not participated	Runner Up	Anestis Petalidis	Giorgos Anastasopoulos, Antonis Antonakis, Stelios Gousios, Giannis Ioannidis, Savvas Kalpidis, Giorgos Karamitsos, Themis Katrios, Giorgos Krystalidis, Antonis Konstantaras, Stergios Bousvaros, Kostas Parisis, Dimitris Rokkos, Giorgos Sountouridis, Giorgos Tsitouras, Takis Tsolos, Kostas Chatzistavrou, Leuteris Hatzopoulos
1963–64	5th place	No tournament	Not participated	No tournament	Anestis Petalidis	Giorgos Anastasopoulos, Antonis Antonakis, Stelios Gousios, Giannis Ioannidis, Giorgos Karamitsos, Themis Katrios, Antonis Konstantaras, Stergios Bousvaros, Dimitris Rokkos, Giorgos Sountouridis, Giorgos Tsitouras, Kostas Chatzistavrou, Leuteris Hatzopoulos
1964–65	Runner Up	No tournament	Not participated	No tournament	Anestis Petalidis	Antonis Antonakis, Giorgos Antonakopoulos, Stelios Gousios, Kostas Dionusopoulos, Giannis Ioannidis, Themis Katrios, Antonis Konstantaras, Stergios Bousvaros, Dimitris Rokkos, Giorgos Sountouridis, Giorgos Tsitouras, Kostas Chatzistavrou, Leuteris Hatzopoulos, Giannis Hortis
1965–66	Runner Up	No tournament	Not participated	No tournament	Anestis Petalidis	Tasos Avanoglou, Giorgos Antonakopoulos, Giannis Ioannidis, Themis Katrios, Stergios Bousvaros, Thodoros Rodopoulos, Giorgos Sountouridis, Giorgos Tsitouras, Kostas Chatzistavrou, Leuteris Hatzopoulos, Giannis Hortis
1966–67	3rd place	No tournament	European Cup; 2nd round	No tournament	Anestis Petalidis	Tasos Avanoglou, Giorgos Antonakopoulos, Giannis Ioannidis, Kostas Kaloudis, Themis Katrios, Stergios Bousvaros, Kostas Parisis, Thodoros Rodopoulos, Giorgos Tsitouras, Kostas Chatzistavrou, Leuteris Hatzopoulos, Giannis Hortis
1967–68	3rd place	No tournament	Not participated	No tournament	Anestis Petalidis	Giorgos Antonakopoulos, Giannis Ioannidis, Kostas Kaloudis, Haris Karapalisis, Themis Katrios, Stergios Bousvaros, Kostas Parisis, Thodoros Rodopoulos, Giorgos Tsitouras, Kostas Chatzistavrou, Leuteris Hatzopoulos, Giannis Hortis
1968–69	4th place	No tournament	Not participated	No tournament	Anestis Petalidis	Giorgos Antonakopoulos, Giannis Ioannidis, Giannis Kallipolitis, Kostas Kaloudis, Themis Katrios, Stergios Bousvaros, Kostas Parisis, Giorgos Tsitouras, Leuteris Hatzopoulos
1969–70	4th place	No tournament	Not participated	No tournament	Anestis Petalidis	Giorgos Antonakopoulos, Nikos Drakopoulos, Giannis Ioannidis, Kostas Kaloudis, Themis Katrios, Vasilis Mpaxevanos, Kostas Parisis, Giorgos Tsitouras, Leuteris Hatzopoulos
1970–71	6th place	No tournament	Not participated	No tournament	Anestis Petalidis	Giorgos Antonakopoulos, Dimitris Darnakas, Nikos Drakopoulos, Giannis Ioannidis, Kostas Kaloudis, Themis Katrios, Makis Tzoumelas, Giorgos Tsakiris, Giorgos Tsitouras, Nikos Fessas, Leuteris Hatzopoulos
1971–72	8th place	No tournament	Not participated	No tournament	Anestis Petalidis	Giannis Ioannidis, Themis Katrios, Giorgos Tsitouras, Dimitris Darnakas, Haris Papageorgiou, Giorgos Antonakopoulos, Vangelis Alexandris, Kostas Kaloudis, Kostas Xatzistavrou, Stergios Bousvaros, Giorgos Tsakiris, Giorgos Pagonis, Takis Symeonidis
1972–73	8th place	No tournament	Not participated	No tournament	Anestis Petalidis	Leuteris Xatzopoulos, Giannis Ioannidis, Dimitris Nastos, Tasos Spartalis, Dimitris Darnakas, Haris Papageorgiou, Giorgos Antonakopoulos, Vangelis Alexandris, Giorgos Tsakiris, Kostas Kaloudis, Panagiotis Kontogiannis, Nikos Nikolis, Giorgos Pagonis, Dimitris Rokkos, Nikos Fessas
1973–74	3rd place	No tournament	Not participated	No tournament	Fedon Mattheou	Leuteris Xatzopoulos, Giannis Ioannidis, Themis Katrios, Giorgos Chalatsiadis, Dimitris Nastos, Giorgos Tsitouras, Dimitris Darnakas, Haris Papageorgiou, Michalis Spiliotis, Vangelis Alexandris, Dimitris Papaioannou, Tasos Spartalis, Minas Kalogridis
1974–75	8th place	No tournament	Korać Cup; 1st round	No tournament	Anestis Petalidis	Giannis Ioannidis, Stelios Kalantidis, Dimitris Nastos, Stavros Holopoulos, Diamantis Skondras, Tasos Spartalis, Dimitris Darnakas, Haris Papageorgiou, Michalis Spiliotis, Vangelis Alexandris, Apostolos Hatziioannou, Themis Katrios, Dimitris Rokkos, Mpampis Tsontzos, Dimitris Tsoumas
1975–76	Runner Up	Last 16	Not participated	No tournament	Harry Pappas	Giorgos Tsakiris, Giannis Ioannidis, Stelios Kalantidis, Stavros Holopoulos, Dimitris Nastos, Diamantis Skondras, Tasos Spartalis, Dimitris Darnakas, Haris Papageorgiou, Michalis Spiliotis, Vangelis Alexandris
1976–77	4th place	Last 8	Korać Cup; 1st round	No tournament	Harry Pappas	Giorgos Tsakiris, Giannis Ioannidis, Stelios Kalantidis, Stavros Holopoulos, Dimitris Nastos, Diamantis Skondras, Tasos Spartalis, John Viskos, Haris Papageorgiou, Michalis Spiliotis, Vangelis Alexandris, Apostolos Hatziioannou, Kostas Stilianou, Dean Rougas
1977–78	8th place	Last 8	Korać Cup; 1st round	No tournament	Irakleios Klaglas	Dimitris Darnakas, Giannis Ioannidis, Stelios Kalantidis, Stavros Holopoulos, Tasos Spartalis, Diamantis Skondras, Vasilis Paramanidis, Dimitris Nastos, Haris Papageorgiou, Michalis Spiliotis, Vangelis Alexandris, Apostolos Hatziioannou, Lazaros Voreadis, Kostas Stilianou, Lazaros Lazaridis
1978–79	Champion	Last 16	Not participated	No tournament	Giannis Ioannidis	Isaak Degemertzis, Dionisis Ananiadis, Stelios Kalantidis, Stavros Holopoulos, Tasos Spartalis, Diamantis Skondras, Vasilis Paramanidis, Dimitris Nastos, Haris Papageorgiou, Michalis Spiliotis, Vangelis Alexandris, Stratos Vamvakoudis, Lazaros Voreadis, Kostas Stilianou
1979–80	Runner Up	Last 8	Euroleague; 1st round	No tournament	Fred Develey	Tasos Thomaidis, Dionisis Ananiadis, Stelios Kalantidis, Nikos Galis, Tasos Spartalis, Diamantis Skondras, Vasilis Paramanidis, Dimitris Nastos, Haris Papageorgiou, Kostas Stilianou, Vangelis Alexandris, Stratos Vamvakoudis, Stavros Holopoulos, Tim Joyce, Phil Taylor
1980–81	3rd place	Last 32	Korać Cup; Last 16	No tournament	Dušan Ivković	Nikos Tsahtanis, Dionisis Ananiadis, Tasos Oikonomou, Nikos Galis, Tasos Spartalis, Diamantis Skondras, Vasilis Paramanidis, Dimitris Nastos, Kostas Stilianou, Nikos Georgiadis, Stratos Vamvakoudis, Stavros Holopoulos, Michalis Romanidis, Tasos Tsitakis
1981–82	Runner Up	Last 8	Korać Cup; 2nd round	No tournament	Dušan Ivković	Nikos Tsahtanis, Dionisis Ananiadis, Nikos Galis, Michalis Giannouzakos, Nikos Georgiadis, Michalis Romanidis, Vasilis Paramanidis, Nikos Filippou, Haris Papageorgiou, Kostas Stilianou, Giorgos Doxakis, Stratos Vamvakoudis, Petros Stamatis, Nikos Zeimpekis
1982–83	Champion	Last 4	Korać Cup; 2nd round	No tournament	Giannis Ioannidis	Nikos Tsahtanis, John Karagiorgis, Nikos Galis, Grigoris Christofakis, Nikos Georgiadis, Michalis Romanidis, Vasilis Paramanidis, Nikos Filippou, Haris Papageorgiou, Kostas Stilianou, Giorgos Doxakis, Petros Stamatis, Diamantis Skondras, Tasos Tsitakis, Minas Toukmenidis
1983–84	Runner Up	Runner Up	Euroleague; 2nd round	No tournament	Giannis Ioannidis	Nikos Tsahtanis, John Karagiorgis, Nikos Galis, Chris Nikitas, Nikos Georgiadis, Mihalis Romanidis, Vassilis Paraminidis, Nikos Filippou, Petros Stamatis, Giorgos Doxakis, Dimitris Kokolakis, Tasos Tsitakis, Giannis Mantopoulos, Grover Woodland, Howard McNeill
1984–85	Champion	Winner	Korać Cup; Last 4	No tournament	Giannis Ioannidis	Nikos Tsahtanis, Panagiotis Giannakis, Nikos Galis, Dimitris Nastos, Grigoris Christofakis, Michalis Romanidis, Vasilis Paramanidis, Nikos Filippou, Petros Stamatis, Giorgos Doxakis, Dimitris Kokolakis, Tasos Tsitakis, George Wenzel, David Binion
1985–86	Champion	Last 4	Euroleague; 2nd round	No tournament	Giannis Ioannidis	Vasilis Lipiridis, Panagiotis Giannakis, Nikos Galis, Giannis Mantopoulos, Tasos Tsitakis, Michalis Romanidis, Petros Stamatis, Nikos Filippou, Haris Papageorgiou, Giorgos Doxakis, Dimitris Kokolakis, Tom Scheffler, Brett Vroman
1986–87	Champion	Winner	Euroleague; 2nd round	No tournament	Giannis Ioannidis	Vasilis Lipiridis, Panagiotis Giannakis, Nikos Galis, Slobodan Subotić, Tasos Tsitakis, Michalis Romanidis, Petros Stamatis, Nikos Filippou, Haris Papageorgiou, Giorgos Doxakis, Dimitris Kokolakis, Vangelis Athanasiadis, Giorgos Kasmeridis, Stratos Karamanolis, Dimitris Karamanolis, Andreas Parisis, Will Jackson
1987–88	Champion	Winner	Euroleague; 4th place	No tournament	Giannis Ioannidis	Vasilis Lipiridis, Panagiotis Giannakis, Nikos Galis, Slobodan Subotić, Vangelis Athanasiadis, Michalis Romanidis, Petros Stamatis, Nikos Filippou, Dimitris Bousvaros, Giorgos Doxakis, Giorgos Kasmeridis, Argiris Daliaris, Stratos Karamanolis, Michail Misounov, Greg Wiltjer
1988–89	Champion	Winner	Euroleague; 3rd place	No tournament	Giannis Ioannidis	Vasilis Lipiridis, Panagiotis Giannakis, Nikos Galis, Slobodan Subotić, Michail Misounov, Michalis Romanidis, Dimitris Avdalas, Nikos Filippou, Manthos Katsoulis, Giorgos Doxakis, Greg Wiltjer, Vagelis Vourtzoumis, Larry Kopczyk
1989–90	Champion	Winner	Euroleague; 4th place	No tournament	Giannis Ioannidis	Vasilis Lipiridis, Panagiotis Giannakis, Nikos Galis, Slobodan Subotić, Michail Misounov, Michalis Romanidis, Vagelis Vourtzoumis, Nikos Filippou, Manthos Katsoulis, Giorgos Doxakis, Stojko Vranković, Kostas Baltatzis, Nikos Tsirakidis, Mike Jones
1990–91	Champion	Last 8	Euroleague; Last 8	No tournament	Lazar Lečić; Michalis Kyritsis	Vasilis Lipiridis, Panagiotis Giannakis, Nikos Galis, Slobodan Subotić, Michail Misounov, Michalis Romanidis, Vagelis Vourtzoumis, Nikos Filippou, Dinos Angelidis, Giorgos Doxakis, Brad Sellers, Kostas Baltatzis, Dimitris Bousvaros, Argiris Daliaris, Argiris Piaras, Dimitris Kalogiros, Vaios Gioras, Goran Sobin
1991–92	3rd place	Winner	EuroLeague; Last 16	No tournament	George Fisher, Lazar Lečić; Michalis Kyritsis; Memos Ioannou	Vasilis Lipiridis, Panagiotis Giannakis, Nikos Galis, Slobodan Subotić, Michail Misounov, Michalis Romanidis, Vagelis Vourtzoumis, Miroslav Peckarski, Dinos Angelidis, Kostas Baltatzis, Edgar Jones, Igor Moraitis, Theodosis Paralikas, Kleanthis Gallos, Tasos Kotzagkiaouridis, Giorgos Kuriazis, Haris Mpimpisidis, Sakis Nikoloudis, Michalis Pournaras, Dimitris Tolios, Memos Ioannou, (Walter Berry left during season)
1992–93	5th place	Runner Up	European Cup; Winner	No tournament	Steve Yatzoglou, Zvi Sherf	Vasilis Lipiridis, Panagiotis Giannakis, Slobodan Subotić, Michail Misunov, Giorgos Gasparis, J.J. Anderson, Miroslav Pecarski, Dinos Angelidis, Vagelis Vourtzoumis, Memos Ioannou, Roy Tarpley, Igor Moraitis, Theodosis Paralikas, Reggie Theus
1993–94	7th place	Last 8	European Cup; Last 4	No tournament	Vlade Đurović, Memos Ioannou	Vasilis Lipiridis, Panagiotis Liadelis, Igor Moraitis, Michail Misunov, Theodosis Paralikas, Giorgos Maslarinos, Miroslav Peckarski, Dinos Angelidis, Vangelis Vurtzumis, Sam Vincent, Sean Higgins, Mihalis Pournaras, Kleanthis Galos, Giorgos Gasparis, (Zdravko Radulović, Anthony Frederick left during season)
1994–95	6th place	Last 4	Korać Cup; Last 32	No tournament	Memos Ioannou, Soulis Markopoulos	Vasilis Lipiridis, Panagiotis Liadelis, Igor Moraitis, Michail Misunov, Tony White, Theodosis Paralikas, Mihalis Pournaras, Dinos Angelidis, Vangelis Vurtzumis, Nestor Papoutsis, Kleanthis Galos, Chris King, Fotis Takianos, Srtzan Karageorgiou, (Terry Catledge left during season)
1995–96	5th place	Last 16	Korać Cup; Last 16	No tournament	Soulis Markopoulos	Vasilis Lipiridis, Panagiotis Liadelis, Igor Moraitis, Michail Misunov, Yannis Siutis, Giorgos Chrysanthopoulos, Mihalis Pournaras, Dinos Angelidis, Harold Ellis, Srtzan Karageorgiou, Ed Stokes, Samir Gouda, Stelios Kostis, Vasilis Kasianos, (Rodney Dent left during season)
1996–97	6th place	Last 16	Korać Cup; Winner	No tournament	Soulis Markopoulos, Slobodan Subotić	José Ortiz, Panagiotis Liadelis, Tzanis Stavrakopoulos, Giannis Sioutis, Giorgos Floros, Mike Nahar, Dinos Angelidis, Aris Holopoulos, Walter Berry, Mario Boni, Alexis Papadatos, Michail Misunov, (Srtzan Karageorgiou, Charles Shackleford, Alan Tomidy left during season)
1997–98	10th place	Winner	Korać Cup; Last 8	No tournament	Eftimis Kioumourtzoglou, Christos Magotsios	Andreas Balis, Panagiotis Liadelis, Giorgos Chrysanthopoulos, Žarko Paspalj, Yannis Siutis, Nasos Galakteros, Mike Nahar, Dinos Angelidis, Giorgos Floros, Hartmut Ortmann, Kuriakos Trouliaris, Filippos Symeonidis, (Mario Boni, José Ortiz, Tiit Sokk left during season)
1998–99	4th place	Last 4	Saporta Cup; Last 4	No tournament	Soulis Markopoulos, Zvi Sherf	Giorgos Floros, Panagiotis Liadelis, Giorgos Chrysanthopoulos, Giorgos Sigalas, Yannis Siutis, Nasos Galakteros, Alexander Kühl, Dinos Angelidis, Dimitris Makris, Martin Müürsepp, Randy White, Andreas Balis, Michalis Pournaras, Mark Nees, (Gary Grant, Mikhail Mikhailov, Stanley Roberts left during season)
1999-00	8th place	Last 8	Korać Cup; Last 16	No tournament	Soulis Markopoulos, Christos Magotsios	Joe Arlauckas, Panagiotis Liadelis, Giorgos Sigalas, Giorgos Chrysanthopoulos, Giorgos Floros, Vladimir Petrovic-Stergiou, Torgeir Bryn, Giorgos Papaulidis, Yannis Gakis, Christos Myriounis, Andreas Balis, (Cheikou N'Diaye, Philippe Urie, Darnell Robinson, Khalid Reeves, David Booth left during season)
2000–01	12th place	Last 8	Saporta Cup; Last 16	No tournament	Dragan Sakota, Steve Yatzoglou	Nikos Papanikolopoulos, Andreas Balis, Yannis Lappas, Sasa Markovic, Yannis Siutis, Giorgos Floros, Vladimir Petrovic-Stergiou, Gordon Firic, Kostas Kakaroudis, Miroslav Raičević, Milos Sakota, (A.J. English, James Forrest, Tim Nees, Anthony Bowie, Josh Grant left during season)
2001–02	10th place	Last 8	Not participated	No tournament	Steve Yatzoglou, Milan Minić	Apostolos Koutroulias, Yorick Williams, Yannis Lappas, Robert Renfroe, Franco Nakic, Yannis Gagaludis, Kostas Kakaroudis, Steve Bucknall, Torraye Braggs, Geert Hammink, Miroslav Raičević, Stamatis Mpakertzakis, Joseph Nikolaidis, Nikos Orfanos, Nikos Savvoulidis, (Frankie King, Isaiah Morris, Brandon Wolfram left during season)
2002–03	5th place	Runner Up	EuroCup Challenge; Winner	No tournament	Milan Minić, Vangelis Alexandris	Will Solomon, Alan Gregov, Giannis Lapas, Prodromos Nikolaidis, Dimitris Haritopoulos, Giannis Gagaloudis, Dimitar Angelov, Kostas Kakaroudis, Fedor Likholitov, Ryan Stack, Ivan Grgat, Miroslav Raičević, Nikos Orfanos, Dimitris Meraxtsakis, Giorgos Brozos, Xristos Papanikolaou
2003–04	5th place	Winner	FIBA EuroCup; Last 8	No tournament	Vangelis Alexandris, Charles Barton	Smush Parker, Nikos Orfanos, Yannis Lappas, Alexis Kiritsis, Dimitris Haritopoulos, Nestoras Kommatos, Nikos Vetoulas, Toby Bailey, Fedor Likholitov, Ryan Stack, Antti Nikkila, Miroslav Raičević, Diamantis Koukouvinos, (Jermaine Jackson, Anthony Goldwire left during season)
2004–05	5th place	Runner Up	ULEB Cup; Last 16	No tournament	Charles Barton	DeJuan Collins, Terrel Castle, Alexis Kiritsis, Arthur Johnson, Dimitris Haritopoulos, Antonis Asimakopoulos, Yahor Meshcharakou, Nikolay Padius, Sotiris Karapostolou, Ryan Stack, Sofoklis Schortsianitis, Miroslav Raičević, Nikos Orfanos, (Desmond Farmer, Jermaine Walker left during season)
2005–06	3rd place	Last 8	ULEB Cup; Runner Up	No tournament	Elias Zouros, Andrea Mazzon	Terrel Castle, Giorgos Sigalas, Savas Kamberidis, Corey Brewer, Dimitris Haritopoulos, Antonis Asimakopoulos, Mike Wilkinson, Nikolay Padius, Panagiotis Karavanas, Ryan Stack, Ante Grgurevic, Nikos Orfanos, Dimitris Karadolamis, Marios Matalon, Vladimir Petrovic-Stergiou, (Alexander Koul, Kenny Taylor, Kevin Freeman, Melvin Scott left during season)
2006–07	3rd place	Last 16	Euroleague; Last 16	No tournament	Andrea Mazzon	Terrel Castle, Giorgos Sigalas, Simonas Serapinas, Alex Scales, Giorgos Kalaitzis, Savas Iliadis, Mike Wilkinson, Kevin Fletcher, Panagiotis Karavanas, Jeremiah Massey, Giannis Giannoulis, Dimitris Tsaldaris, Spyros Panteliadis, Marios Matalon, Gaios Skordilis, Mahmoud Abdul-Rauf
2007–08	5th place	Last 4	Euroleague; Last 16	No tournament	Gordon Herbert	Reyshawn Terry, Darius Washington, Bracey Wright, Giorgos Kalaitzis, Savas Iliadis, Vladimir Boisa, Gaios Skordilis, Hanno Möttölä, Jeremiah Massey, Lazaros Agadakos, Dimitris Tsaldaris, Spyros Panteliadis, Dimitris Karadolamis, Michalis Tsairelis, (Terrel Castle, Simonas Serapinas left during season)
2008–09	4th place	Last 8	ULEB Eurocup; Last 32	No tournament	Andrea Mazzon	Keydren Clark, Bracey Wright, Andrew Betts, Nikos Argiropoulos, Savas Iliadis, Anton Gavel, Gaios Skordilis, Kostas Papanikolaou, Lazaros Agadakos, Nikos Barlos, Dimitrios Tsaldaris, Spencer Nelson, Linos Chrysikopoulos, Spyros Mourtos, (Blagota Sekulić, Sean Marshall left during season)
2009–10	7th place	Last 4	ULEB Eurocup; Quarterfinals	No tournament	Andrea Mazzon, Fotis Katsikaris, David Blatt	Keydren Clark, Nikos Argiropoulos, Andrew Betts, Jeremy Richardson, Nikos Hatzivrettas, Dimos Dikoudis, Gaios Skordilis, Ivan Paunić, Michalis Kakiouzis, Nikos Barlos, Christos Papanikolaou, Aaron Miles, Linos Chrysikopoulos, Spyros Mourtos, Matt Walsh, (Dragan Labović, Juan Dixon, Quinton Day, Corey Belser left during the season)
2010–11	4th place	Last 4	ULEB Eurocup; Last 16	No tournament	Sharon Drucker, Slobodan Subotic	Bobby Brown, Brendan Winters, Christos Tapoutos, Anthony King, Michalis Tsairelis, Nikos Hatzivrettas, Kostas Haralabidis, Anatoly Kashirov, Fanis Koumpouras, Edin Bavcic, Linos Chrysikopoulos, Dimitris Verginis, Kostas Sloukas, (John Thomas, Gaios Skordilis, Dejan Borovnjak, P. J. Tucker, Bryant Dunston, Pierre Pierce left during the season)
2011–12	7th place	Last 8	ULEB Eurocup; Last 16	No tournament	Vangelis Alexandris	Dan Mavraides, Sergio Kerusch, Christos Tapoutos, Michalis Tsairelis, Ronald Davis, Matej Krusic, Lefteris Bochoridis, Giorgos Bogris, Sam Muldrow, Dimitris Verginis, Tasos Dimas, Sasha Vezenkov (Adrian Oliver, Dominic James, Dimitris Tsaldaris left during the season)
2012–13	6th place	Last 10	Not participated	No tournament	Vangelis Alexandris, Vangelis Angelou	Sotiris Karapostolou, Muhamed Pasalic, Giorgos Tsiaras, Lefteris Bochoridis, Jeremy Hunt, Mihalis Pelekanos, Dimitris Verginis, Tasos Dimas, Sasha Vezenkov, Antonis Asimakopoulos, Kostas Harisis, Zisis Sarikopoulos, Spyros Mourtos, Petros Geromichalos, Nikos Bochoridis, Efthymios Tsakaleris
2013–14	7th place	Runner Up	Not participated	No tournament	Vangelis Angelou, Milan Minić	Stelios Poulianitis, Kostas Mitoglou, Giannoulis Larentzakis, Lefteris Bochoridis, Jeremy Hunt, Mihalis Pelekanos, Nikos Gkikas, Giannis Athinaiou, Sasha Vezenkov, Antonis Asimakopoulos, Kostas Harisis, Zisis Sarikopoulos, Spyros Mourtos, Efthymios Tsakaleris
2014–15	4th place	Last 8	Not participated	No tournament	Dimitris Priftis	Muhamed Pašalić, Giorgos Tsiaras, Tasos Dimas, Lamarcus Reed, Torey Thomas, Stelios Poulianitis, Kostas Charissis, Giannis Karathanasis, Sasha Vezenkov, Drew Naymick, Spyros Mourtos, Vasileios Symtsak, Dimitris Flionis, Ogo Adegboye (Sotiris Manolopoulos, Nikos Gkikas, left during the season)
2015–16	4th place	Last 4	Eurocup Basketball; Last 32	No tournament	Dimitris Priftis	Vassilis Xanthopoulos, Tasos Dimas, Michalis Pelekanos, Slaven Cupkovic, Dimitris Flionis, Okaro White, Dominic Waters, Nikos Diplaros, Theodoros Zaras, Jamelle Hagins, Jake Cohen, Spyros Mourtos, Vassilis Symtsak, Jerel McNeal
2016–17	4th place	Runner Up	Basketball Champions League; Last 16	No tournament	Dimitris Priftis	Michalis Tsairelis, Vassilis Kavvadas, Spyros Mourtos, Will Cummings, Antwan Scott, Tadija Dragićević, Vlado Janković, Theodoros Zaras, Vassilis Xanthopoulos, Vassilis Symtsak, Vassilis Christidis, Panagiotis Kalaitzakis

== Notable players ==
Note: Flags indicate national team eligibility at FIBA-sanctioned events. Players may hold other non-FIBA nationalities not displayed.

Criteria

To appear in this section a player must have either:

- Set a club record or won an individual award while at the club
- Played at least one official international match for their national team at any time
- Played at least one official NBA match at any time.

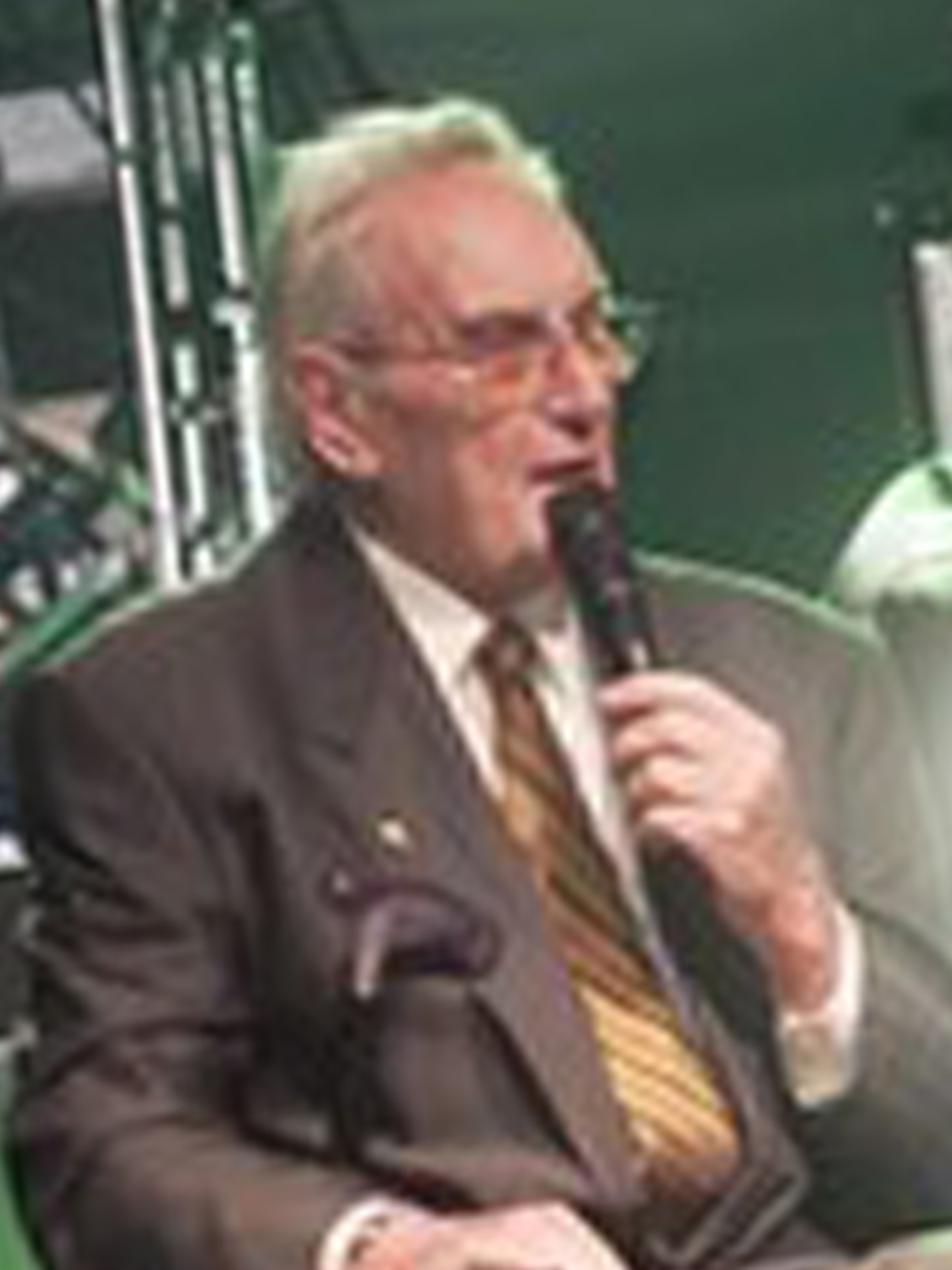
Faidon Matthaiou

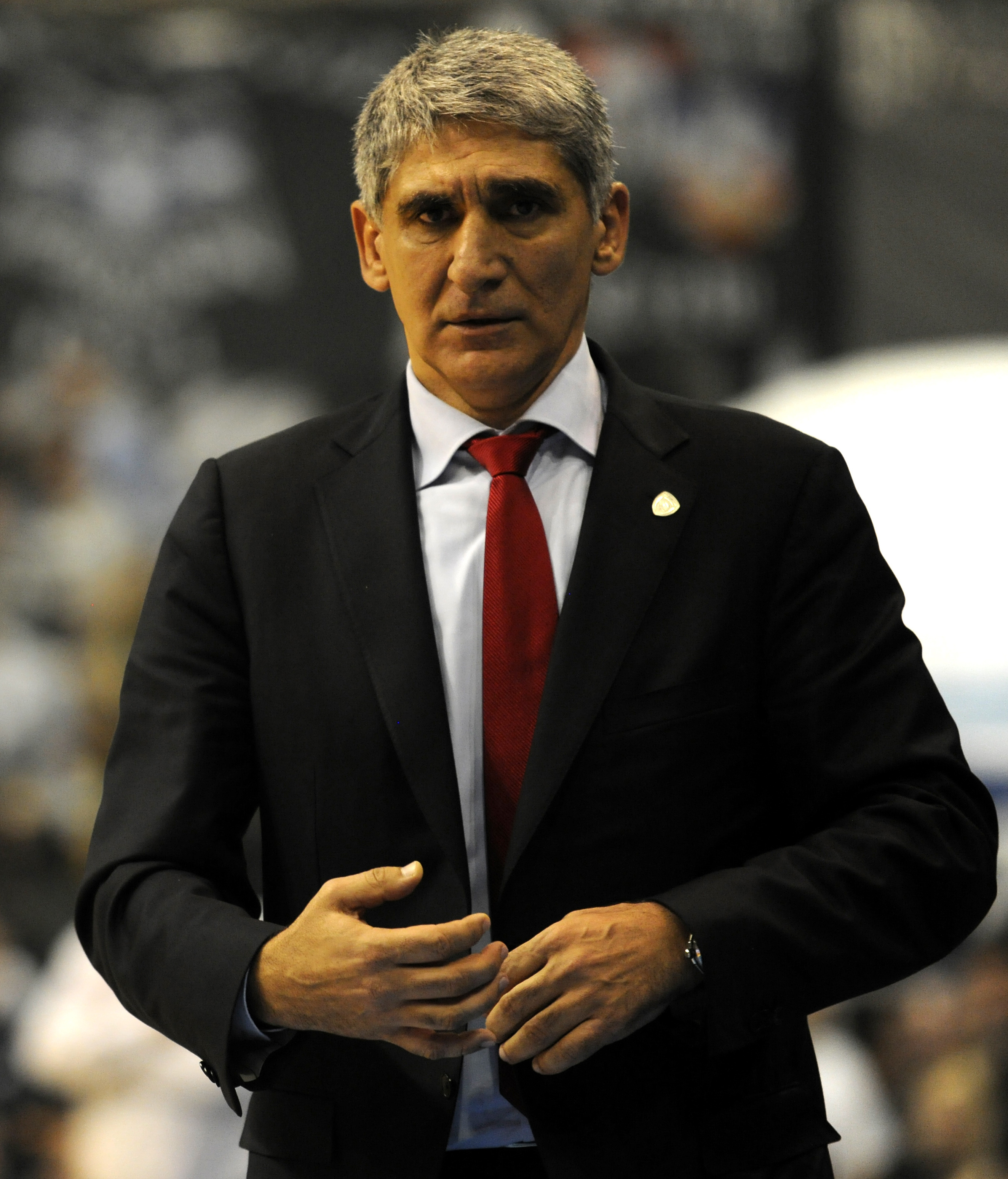
Panagiotis Giannakis

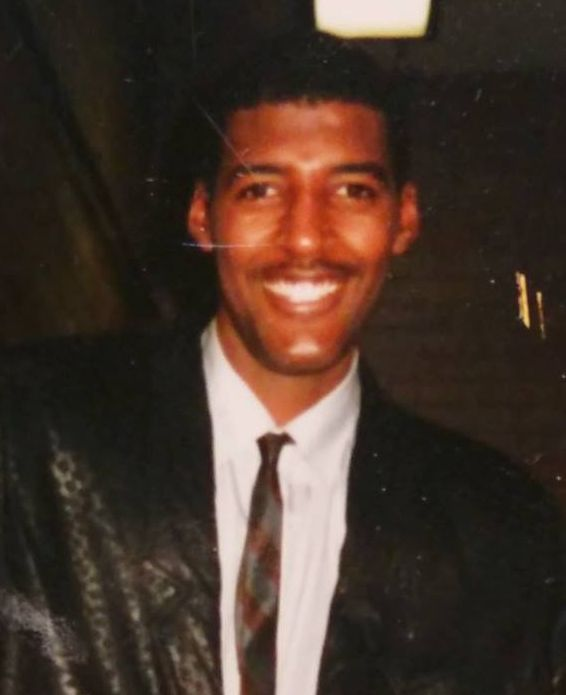
Roy Tarpley

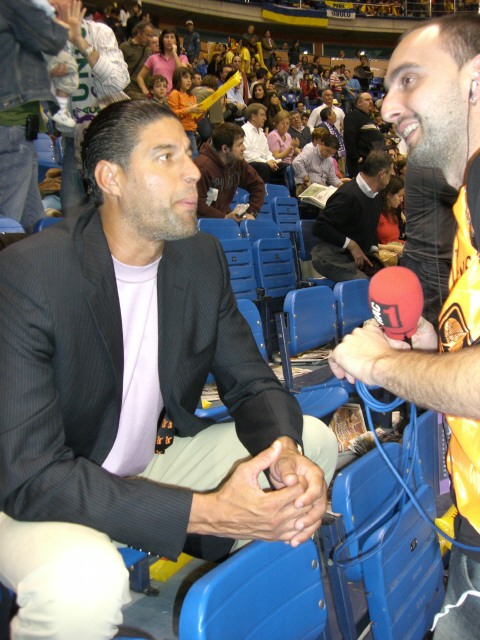
José Ortiz

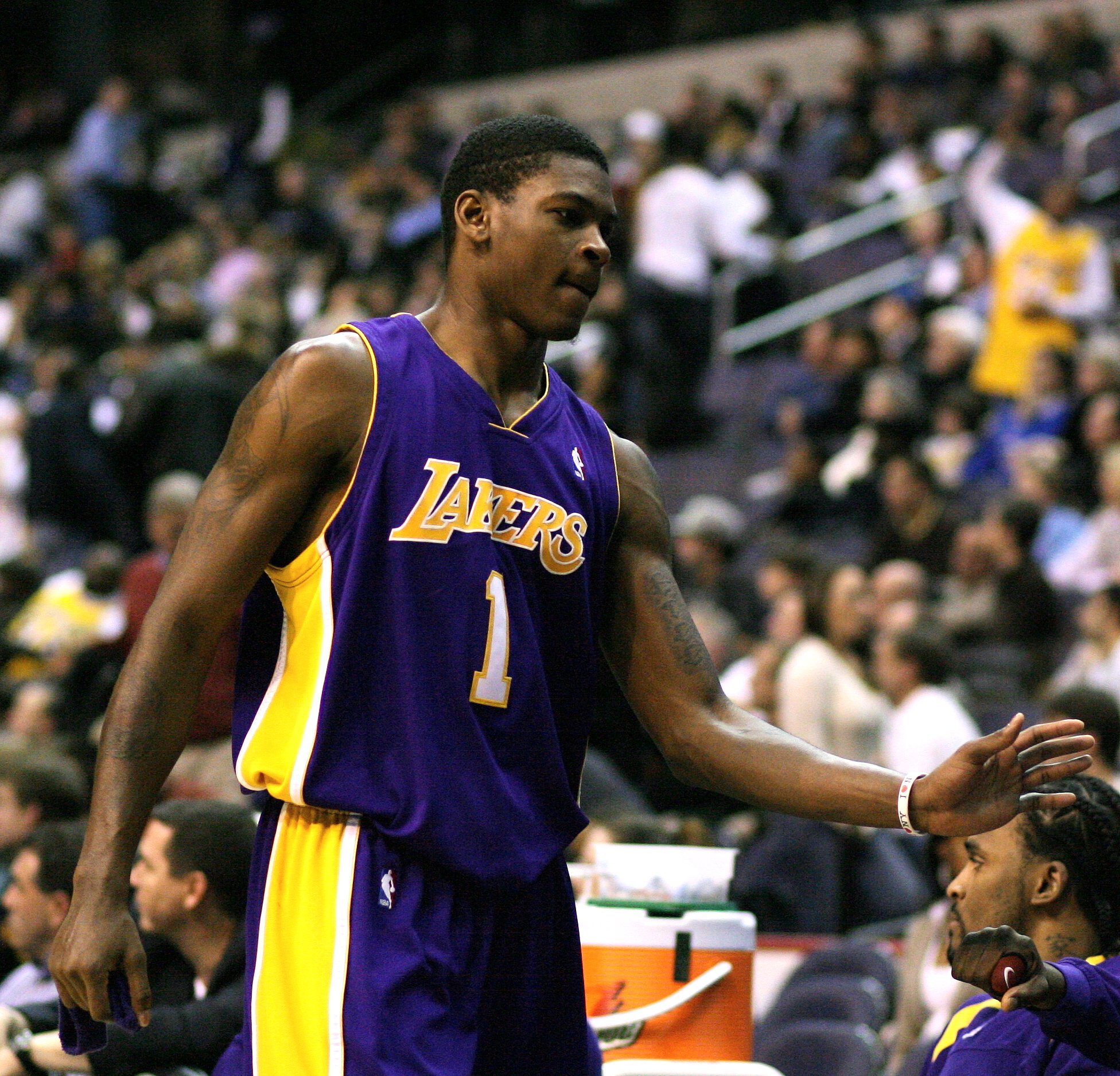
Smush Parker

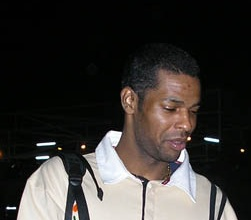
Nestoras Kommatos

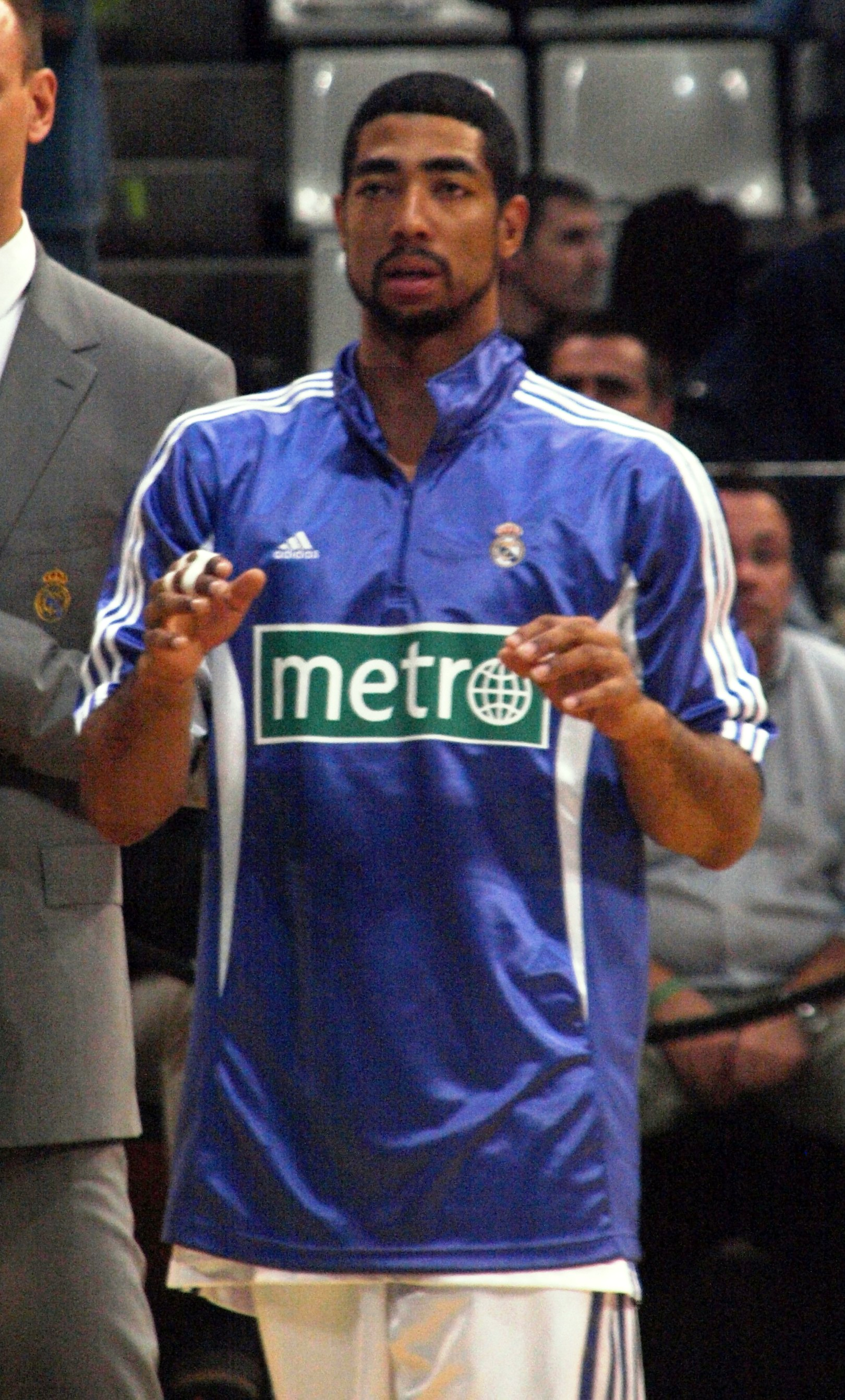
Jeremiah Massey

Greece

- (Greece) Lazaros Agadakos
- (Greece) Vangelis Alexandris
- (Greece) Dinos Angelidis
- (Greece) Antonis Asimakopoulos
- (Greece) Ioannis Athinaiou
- (Greece) Nikos Barlos
- (Greece) Lefteris Bochoridis
- (Greece) Kostas Charalampidis
- (Greece) Kostas Charissis
- (Greece) Nikos Chatzivrettas
- (Greece) Linos Chrysikopoulos
- (Greece) Dimos Dikoudis
- (Greece) Georgios Doxakis
- (Greece) Nikos Filippou
- (Greece) Ioannis Gagaloudis
- (Greece) Nasos Galakteros
- (Greece) - (United States) Nikos Galis
- (Greece) Georgios Gasparis
- (Greece) Panagiotis Giannakis
- (Greece) Giannis Giannoulis
- (Greece) Nikos Gkikas
- (Greece) Savvas Iliadis
- (Greece) Giannis Ioannidis
- (Greece) Memos Ioannou
- (Greece) Michalis Kakiouzis
- (Greece) Georgios Kalaitzis
- (Greece) Manthos Katsoulis
- (Greece) Vassilis Kavvadas
- (Greece) Dimitris Kokolakis
- (Greece) Nestoras Kommatos
- (Greece) Alexis Kyritsis
- (Greece) Giannoulis Larentzakis
- (Greece) Panagiotis Liadelis
- (Greece) Vassilis Lipiridis
- (Greece) Sotiris Manolopoulos
- (Greece) Marios Matalon
- (Greece) Faidon Matthaiou
- (Greece) Dinos Mitoglou
- (Greece) Spyros Mourtos
- (Greece) Christos Myriounis
- (Greece) Makis Nikolaidis
- (Greece) Charis Papageorgiou
- (Greece) Kostas Papanikolaou
- (Greece) Michalis Pelekanos
- (Greece) Stelios Poulianitis
- (Greece) Michalis Romanidis
- (Greece) Zisis Sarikopoulos
- (Greece) Sofoklis Schortsanitis
- (Greece) Georgios Sigalas
- (Greece) Ioannis Sioutis
- (Greece) Gaios Skordilis
- (Greece) Kostas Sloukas
- (Greece) Tzanis Stavrakopoulos
- (Greece) Vassilis Symtsak
- (Greece) Christos Tapoutos
- (Greece) Vassilis Toliopoulos
- (Greece) Michalis Tsairelis
- (Greece) Dimitris Tsaldaris
- (Greece) Dimitris Verginis
- (Greece) Nikos Vetoulas
- (Greece) Vangelis Vourtzoumis
- (Greece) Vassilis Xanthopoulos

USA

- (United States) Mahmoud Abdul-Rauf
- (United States) J.J. Anderson
- (United States) Joe Arlauckas
- (United States) Toby Bailey
- (United States) Corey Belser
- (United States) Walter Berry
- (United States) David Booth
- (United States) Anthony Bowie
- (United States) Torraye Braggs
- (United States) Corey Brewer
- (United States) Bobby Brown
- (United States) Eric Buckner
- (United States) - (Bosnia and Herzegovina) Terrel Castle
- (United States) Terry Catledge
- (United States) Mario Chalmers
- (United States) - (Bulgaria) Kee Kee Clark
- (United States) DeJuan Collins
- (United States) Anthony Cowan Jr.
- (United States) Will Cummings
- (United States) David DeJulius
- (United States) Rodney Dent
- (United States) Juan Dixon
- (United States) - (Austria) Bryce Douvier
- (United States) - (Armenia) Bryant Dunston
- (United States) Harold Ellis
- (United States) A. J. English
- (United States) Desmon Farmer
- (United States) - (North Macedonia) Kevin Fletcher
- (United States) James Forrest
- (United States) Anthony Frederick
- (United States) Kevin Freeman
- (United States) Roberto Gallinat
- (United States) Anthony Goldwire
- (United States) Gary Grant
- (United States) - (Spain) Josh Grant
- (United States) Jamelle Hagins
- (United States) Ronnie Harrell
- (United States) Sean Higgins
- (United States) Jermaine Jackson
- (United States) Dominic James
- (United States) Michael Jenkins
- (United States) Edgar Jones
- (United States) Mike Jones
- (United States) Shakur Juiston
- (United States) James Kelly
- (United States) - (Germany) Sergio Kerusch
- (United States) Chris King
- (United States) Frankie King
- (United States) Sean Marshall
- (United States) - (North Macedonia) Jeremiah Massey
- (United States) Jerel McNeal
- (United States) Aaron Miles
- (United States) Isaiah Morris
- (United States) Sam Muldrow
- (United States) - (Azerbaijan) Spencer Nelson
- (United States) Smush Parker
- (United States) Pierre Pierce
- (United States) Adrian Oliver
- (United States) Khalid Reeves
- (United States) Jeremy Richardson
- (United States) Darnell Robinson
- (United States) Alex Scales
- (United States) Tom Scheffler
- (United States) Melvin Scott
- (United States) Brad Sellers
- (United States) Charles Shackleford
- (United States) Will Solomon
- (United States) - (North Macedonia) Ryan Stack
- (United States) Ed Stokes
- (United States) Roy Tarpley
- (United States) Reyshawn Terry
- (United States) Reggie Theus
- (United States) John Thomas
- (United States) P. J. Tucker
- (United States) Sam Vincent
- (United States) Brett Vroman
- (United States) Jermaine Walker
- (United States) Matt Walsh
- (United States) - (North Macedonia) Darius Washington Jr.
- (United States) Dominic Waters
- (United States) Randy White
- (United States) Okaro White
- (United States) Tony White
- (United States) - (North Macedonia) Mike Wilkinson
- (United States) Xeyrius Williams
- (United States) Darral Willis
- (United States) Trey Woodbury
- (United States) Bracey Wright

Rest of the Americas

- (Puerto Rico) José Ortiz (Piculín)
- (Canada) Olivier Hanlan
- (Canada) - (Greece) Elijah Mitrou-Long
- (Canada) Greg Wiltjer

Europe

- (Bulgaria) Dimitar Angelov
- (Bosnia and Herzegovina) Edin Bavčić
- (Bosnia and Herzegovina) Muhamed Pašalić
- (Georgia (country)) - (Slovenia) Vladimir Boisa
- (Georgia (country)) Viktor Sanikidze
- (Israel) - (United States) Jake Cohen
- (Russia) Anatoly Kashirov
- (Russia) Fedor Likholitov
- (Russia) Mikhail Mikhailov
- (Russia) Nikolay Padius
- (Russia) - (Greece) - (North Macedonia) Michail Misounov
- (Croatia) Alan Gregov
- (Croatia) Zdravko Radulović
- (Croatia) Ante Grgurević
- (Croatia) Stojko Vranković
- (Croatia) - (Greece) Franko Nakić
- (Estonia) Martin Müürsepp
- (Finland) Hanno Möttölä
- (Finland) Antti Nikkilä
- (Italy) Mario Boni
- (Netherlands) Geert Hammink
- (Norway) Torgeir Bryn
- (Germany) Alexander Kühl
- (Serbia) Žarko Paspalj
- (Serbia) Ivan Paunić
- (Serbia) - (Greece) Miroslav Pecarski
- (Serbia) - (Greece) Vladimir Petrović-Stergiou
- (Serbia) - (Greece) Miroslav Raičević
- (Serbia) - (Greece) Srđan Jovanović
- (Serbia) Dejan Borovnjak
- (Serbia) Dragan Labović
- (Slovakia) - (Germany) Anton Gavel
- (Montenegro) Vladimir Dragičević
- (Montenegro) Blagota Sekulić
- (Lithuania) Simonas Serapinas
- (Estonia) - (Greece) Tiit Sokk
- (Slovenia) Matej Krušič
- (Slovenia) - (Greece) Slobodan Subotić
- (Bulgaria) - (Cyprus) - (Greece) Sasha Vezenkov
- (United Kingdom) Andrew Betts
- (United Kingdom) Steve Bucknall
- (United Kingdom) Yorick Williams

=== All-Time Depth chart ===
Pos.	Starting 5	Bench 1	Bench 2
C	Roy Tarpley	Stojko Vranković	Faidon Matthaiou
PF	José Ortiz	Aleksandar Vezenkov	Dinos Angelidis
SF	Slobodan Subotić	Charis Papageorgiou	Lefteris Bochoridis
SG	Nikos Galis	Mario Boni	Vassilis Toliopoulos
PG	Panagiotis Giannakis	Will Solomon	Panagiotis Liadelis

== Club captains ==
Aris B.C. team captains, since the 1979–80 season:

Period	Team Captain
1979–1981	(Greece) Vangelis Alexandris
1981–1983	(Greece) Charis Papageorgiou
1983–1992	(United States) (Greece) Nikos Galis
1992–1993	(Greece) Panagiotis Giannakis
1993–1997	(Russia) (Greece) Michail Misunov
1997–1999	(Greece) Dinos Angelidis
1999–2000	(Greece) Panagiotis Liadelis
2000–2002	(Greece) Giorgos Floros
2002–2004	(Greece) Giannis Lappas
2004–2006	(United States) Ryan Stack
2006–2008	(United States) (Bosnia and Herzegovina) Terrel Castle
2008–2009	(Greece) Savvas Iliadis
2009–2011	(Greece) Nikos Chatzivrettas
2011–2012	(Greece) Christos Tapoutos
2012–2014	(Greece) Antonis Asimakopoulos
2014–2018	(Greece) Spyros Mourtos
2018–2020	(Greece) Lefteris Bochoridis
2020–2021	(Greece) Dimitris Flionis
2021–2023	(Greece) Stavros Schizas
2023–2025	(Greece) Vassilis Toliopoulos
2025–present	(Greece) Lefteris Bochoridis

=== Greece national team players ===
These players have played for both Aris and the senior Greece men's national basketball team (in any game, official or friendly, and in any tournament, FIBA sanctioned, or non-FIBA sanctioned):

- Vangelis Alexandris
- Dinos Angelidis
- Antonis Asimakopoulos
- Ioannis Athinaiou
- Nikos Barlos
- Lefteris Bochoridis
- Georgios Bogris
- Kostas Charissis
- Kostas Charalampidis
- Dimitris Charitopoulos
- Nikos Chatzivrettas
- Linos Chrysikopoulos
- Dimos Dikoudis
- Nikos Filippou
- Nasos Galakteros
- Nikos Galis
- Nikos Gkikas
- Georgios Gasparis
- Panagiotis Giannakis
- Giannis Giannoulis
- Michalis Giannouzakos
- Savvas Iliadis
- Giannis Ioannidis
- Memos Ioannou
- Vlado Janković
- Michalis Kakiouzis
- Georgios Kalaitzis
- Dimitris Karadolamis
- Manthos Katsoulis
- Vassilis Kavvadas
- Dimitris Kokolakis
- Nestoras Kommatos
- Fanis Koumpouras
- Alexis Kyritsis
- Giannoulis Larentzakis
- Panagiotis Liadelis
- Vassilis Lipiridis
- Faidon Matthaiou
- Dinos Mitoglou
- Christos Myriounis
- Charis Papageorgiou
- Kostas Papanikolaou
- Nikos Papanikolopoulos
- Michalis Pelekanos
- Michalis Romanidis
- Sofoklis Schortsanitis
- Georgios Sigalas
- Ioannis Sioutis
- Gaios Skordilis
- Kostas Sloukas
- Tzanis Stavrakopoulos
- Christos Tapoutos
- Michalis Tsairelis
- Dimitris Tsaldaris
- Panagiotis Vasilopoulos
- Nikos Vetoulas
- Vangelis Vourtzoumis
- Vassilis Xanthopoulos
- Zisis Sarikopoulos

== Aris head coaches by season ==
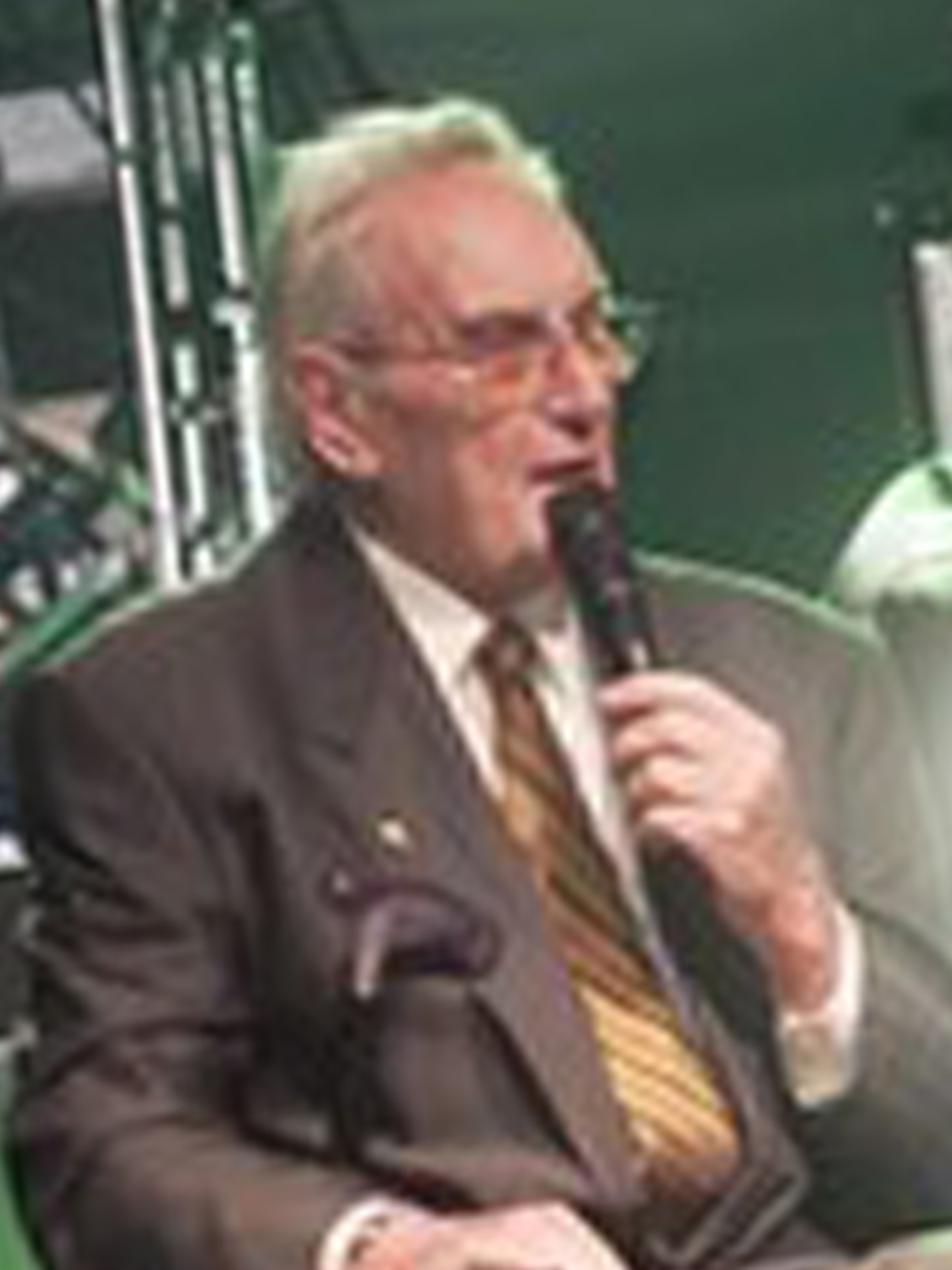
Faidon Matthaiou

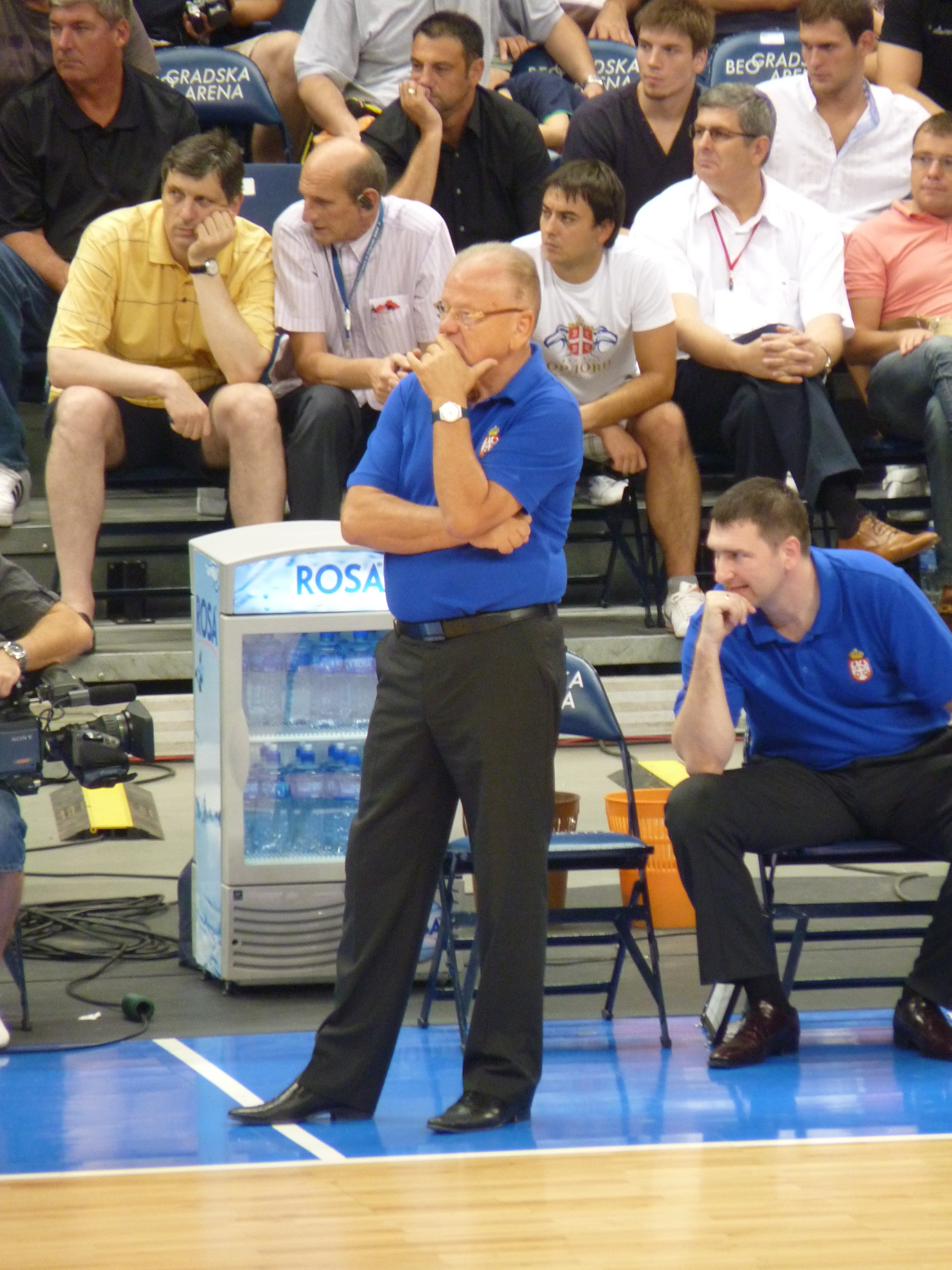
Dušan Ivković

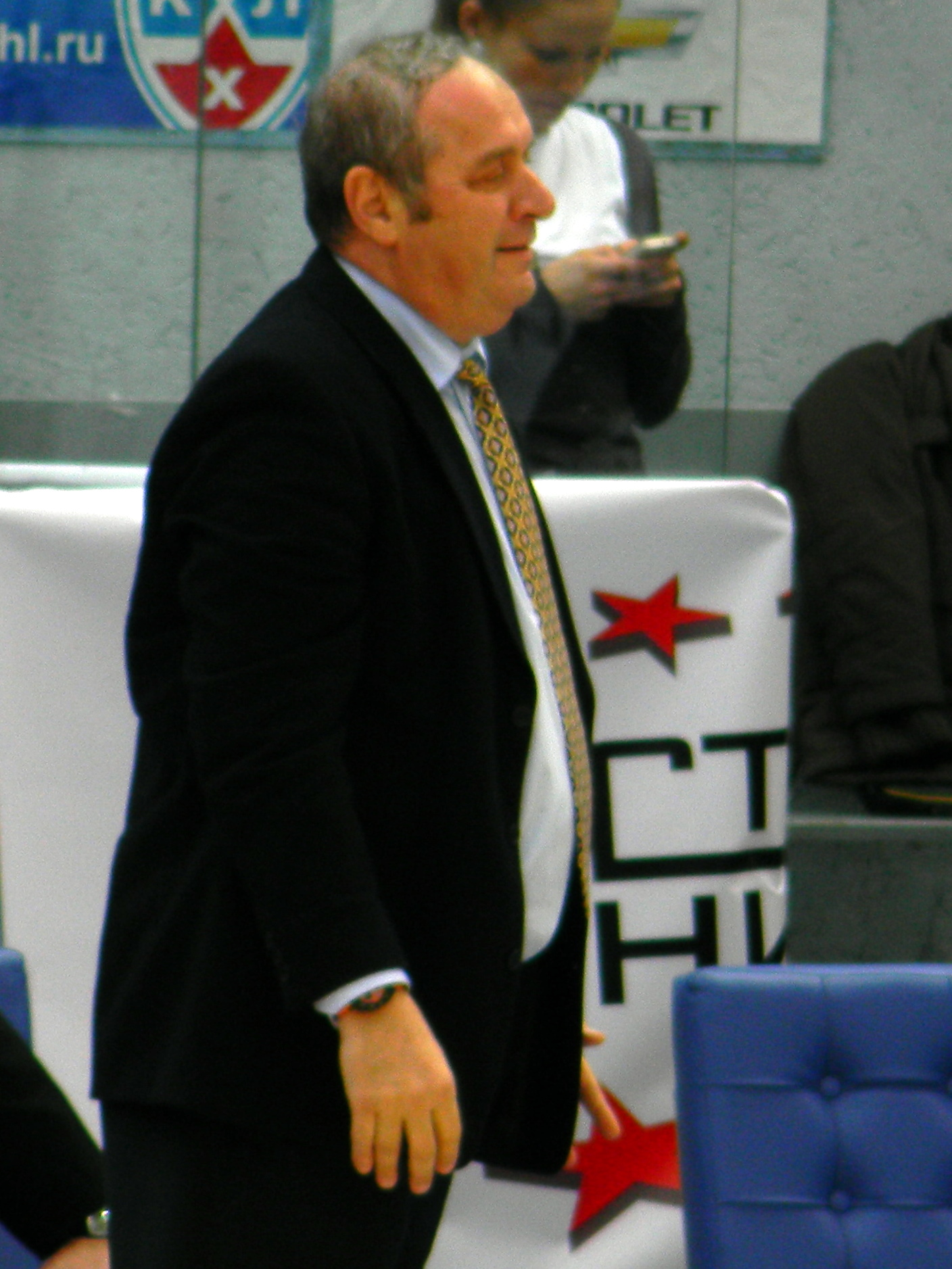
Zvi Sherf

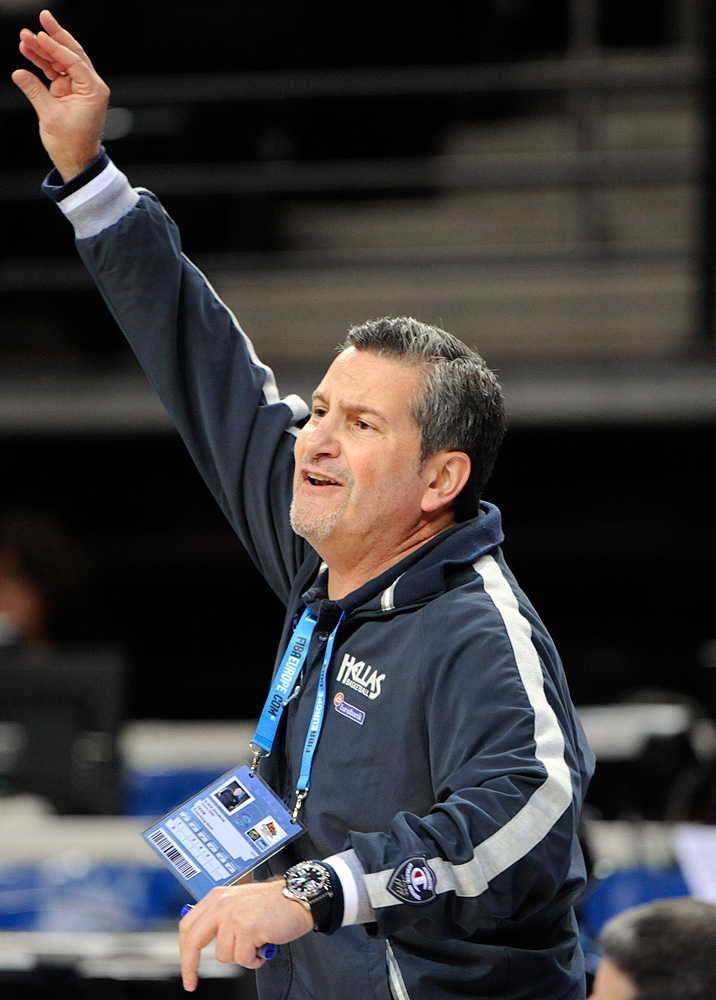
Ilias Zouros

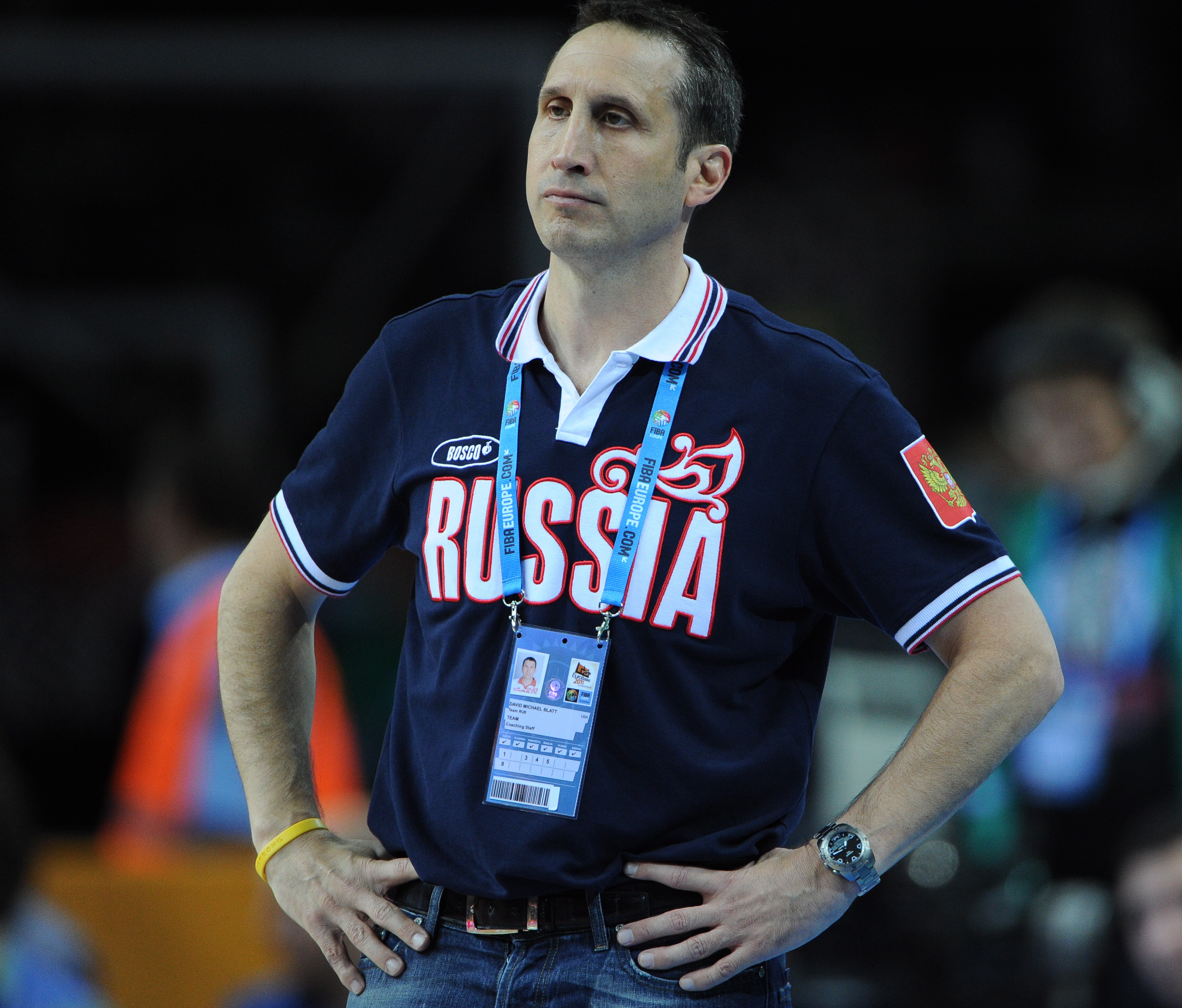
David Blatt

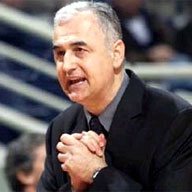
Dragan Šakota

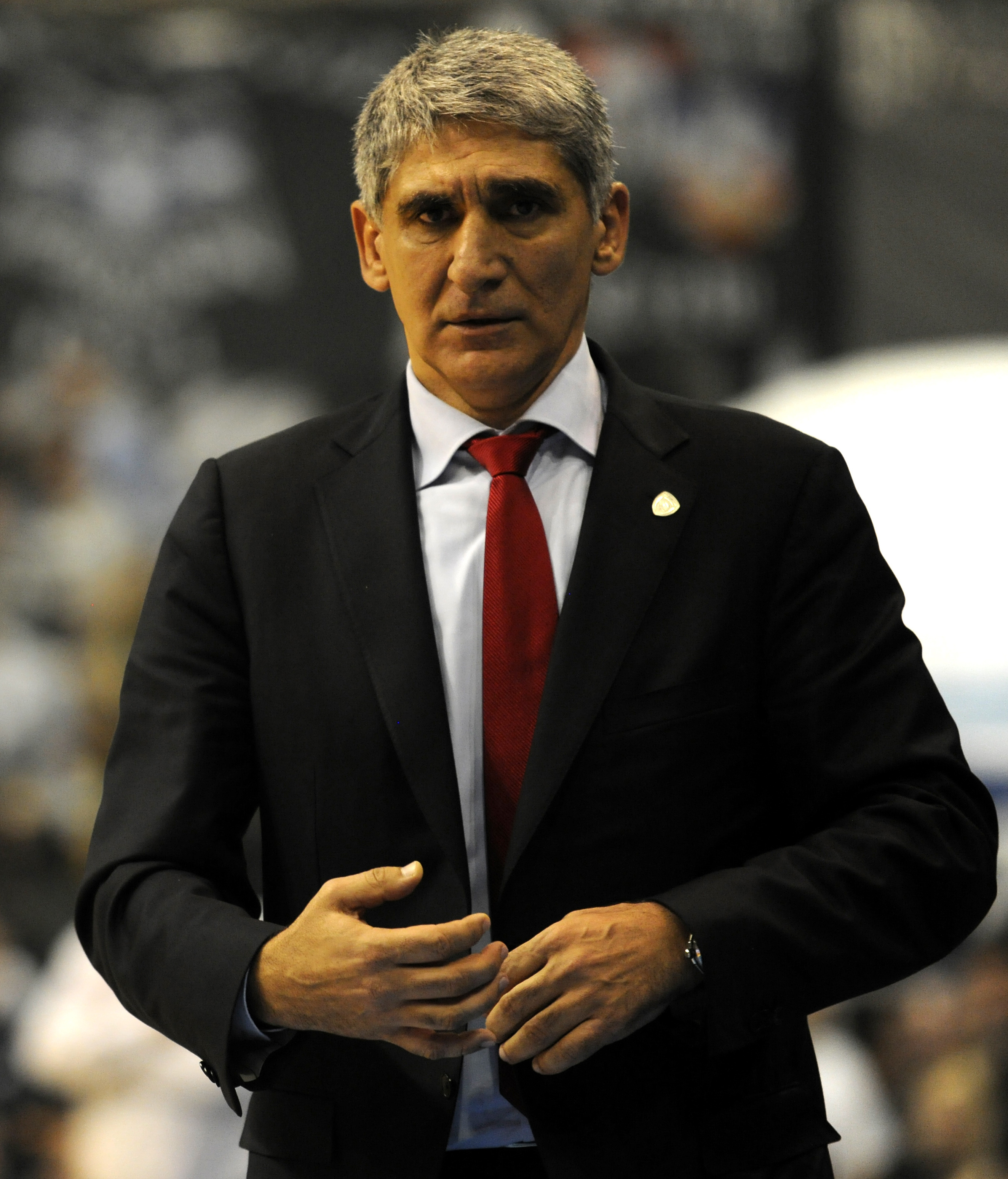
Panagiotis Giannakis

Head Coach	Seasons
(Greece) Anestis Petalidis	1952–53 to 1972–73
(Greece) Faidon Matthaiou	1973–74
(Greece) Anestis Petalidis	1974–75
(Greece) - (United States) Harry Pappas	1975–76 & 1976–77
(Greece) Irakleios Klaglas	1977–78
(Greece) Giannis Ioannidis	1978–79
(Greece) Anestis Petalidis (United States) Fred G. Develey	1979–80
(Socialist Federal Republic of Yugoslavia) Dušan Ivković	1980–81 & 1981–82
(Greece) Giannis Ioannidis	1982–83 to 1989–90
(Socialist Federal Republic of Yugoslavia) Lazar Lečić (Greece) Michalis Kyritsis	1990–91
(United States) George Fisher (North Macedonia) Lazar Lečić (Greece) Michalis Kyritsis (Greece) Memos Ioannou	1991–92
(Greece) - (United States) Steve Giatzoglou (Israel) Zvi Sherf	1992–93
(Federal Republic of Yugoslavia) - (Greece) Vlade Đurović (Greece) Memos Ioannou	1993–94
(Greece) Memos Ioannou (Greece) Soulis Markopoulos	1994–95
(Greece) Soulis Markopoulos	1995–96
(Greece) Soulis Markopoulos (Slovenia) - (Greece) Slobodan Subotić	1996–97
(Greece) Efthimis Kioumourtzoglou (Greece) Christos Magotsios	1997–98
(Greece) Soulis Markopoulos (Israel) Zvi Sherf	1998–99
(Greece) Soulis Markopoulos (Greece) Christos Magotsios	1999–00
(Federal Republic of Yugoslavia) - (Greece) Dragan Šakota (Greece) - (United States) Steve Giatzoglou	2000–01

Head Coach	Seasons
(Greece) - (United States) Steve Giatzoglou (Federal Republic of Yugoslavia) Milan Minić	2001–02
(Serbia and Montenegro) Milan Minić (Greece) Vangelis Alexandris	2002–03
(Greece) Vangelis Alexandris (United States) Charles Barton	2003–04
(United States) Charles Barton	2004–05
(Greece) Ilias Zouros (Italy) Andrea Mazzon	2005–06
(Italy) Andrea Mazzon	2006–07
(Canada) Gordie Herbert	2007–08
(Italy) Andrea Mazzon	2008–09
(Italy) Andrea Mazzon (Greece) Fotis Katsikaris (United States) - (Israel) David Blatt	2009–10
(Israel) Sharon Drucker (Slovenia) - (Greece) Slobodan Subotić	2010–11
(Greece) Vangelis Alexandris	2011–12
(Greece) Vangelis Alexandris (Greece) Vangelis Angelou	2012–13
(Greece) Vangelis Angelou (Serbia) Milan Minić	2013–14
(Greece) Dimitris Priftis	2014–15 to 2016–17
(Greece) Panagiotis Giannakis (Greece) Vangelis Angelou	2017–18
(Greece) Vangelis Angelou (Greece) Ioannis Kastritis	2018–19
(Greece) Soulis Markopoulos (Greece) Savvas Kamperidis	2019–20
(Greece) Savvas Kamperidis	2020–21
(Greece) Ioannis Kastritis	2021–24
(Greece) Ioannis Kastritis (Greece) Nikos Vetoulas	2024–25
(Serbia) Bogdan Karaičić (Croatia) (Poland) Igor Miličić	2025–26

== Management ==
=== Ownership, Board of Directors & Administrative Staff ===
Position	Staff
Ownership	(United States) RHC (90%)
President	(Greece) Charis Papageorgiou
CEO	(Greece) Agapitos Diakogiannis
COO	(Greece) Byron Antoniadis
Member of Board	(Greece) Christos Tsiakos
AC Representer	(Greece) Avraam Tosounidis
Head of Sponsorships	(Greece) Elena Kouyoufa
Head of Brand Strategy & Innovation	(Greece) Mihalis Monemvasiotis
Marketing Operations Manager	(Greece) Dimitris Kamtsikoudis
Matchday Operations Manager	(Greece) Yannis Papadopoulos
Retail, Product & Merchandise Manager	(Greece) Rafaella Karacharisi
Press Officer	(Greece) Antonis Gatzios
Assistant Press Officer	(Greece) Anna-Maria Chatziaslanidou

=== Medical team ===
Position	Name
Club's doctor	(Greece) Nikolaos Koukoulias
Physiotherapist	(Greece) Tolis Karatzas
Physiotherapist	(Greece) Alexandros Panagiotis Boutovinos
Physiotherapist	(Greece) Charilaos Glaros
Physiotherapist	(Greece) Thodoris Alexiadis
Caregiver	(Greece) Giannis Nikitakis

== See also ==
- Aris Thessaloniki
