= Panathinaikos B.C. past rosters =

Greek basketball team rosters

== 1945–46 ==
Titles

- (Greece) Greek Champion

Roster

- (Greece) Ioannis Lambrou
- (Greece) Missas Pantazopoulos
- (Greece) Stelios Arvanitis
- (Greece) Jack Nikolaidis
- (Greece) Giorgos Nikolaidis
- (Greece) Thymios Karadimos

== 1946–47 ==
Titles

- (Greece) Greek Champion

Roster

- (Greece) Ioannis Lambrou
- (Greece) Missas Pantazopoulos
- (Greece) Stelios Arvanitis
- (Greece) Jack Nikolaidis
- (Greece) Giorgos Nikolaidis
- (Greece) Dimitrakopoulos

== 1949–50 ==
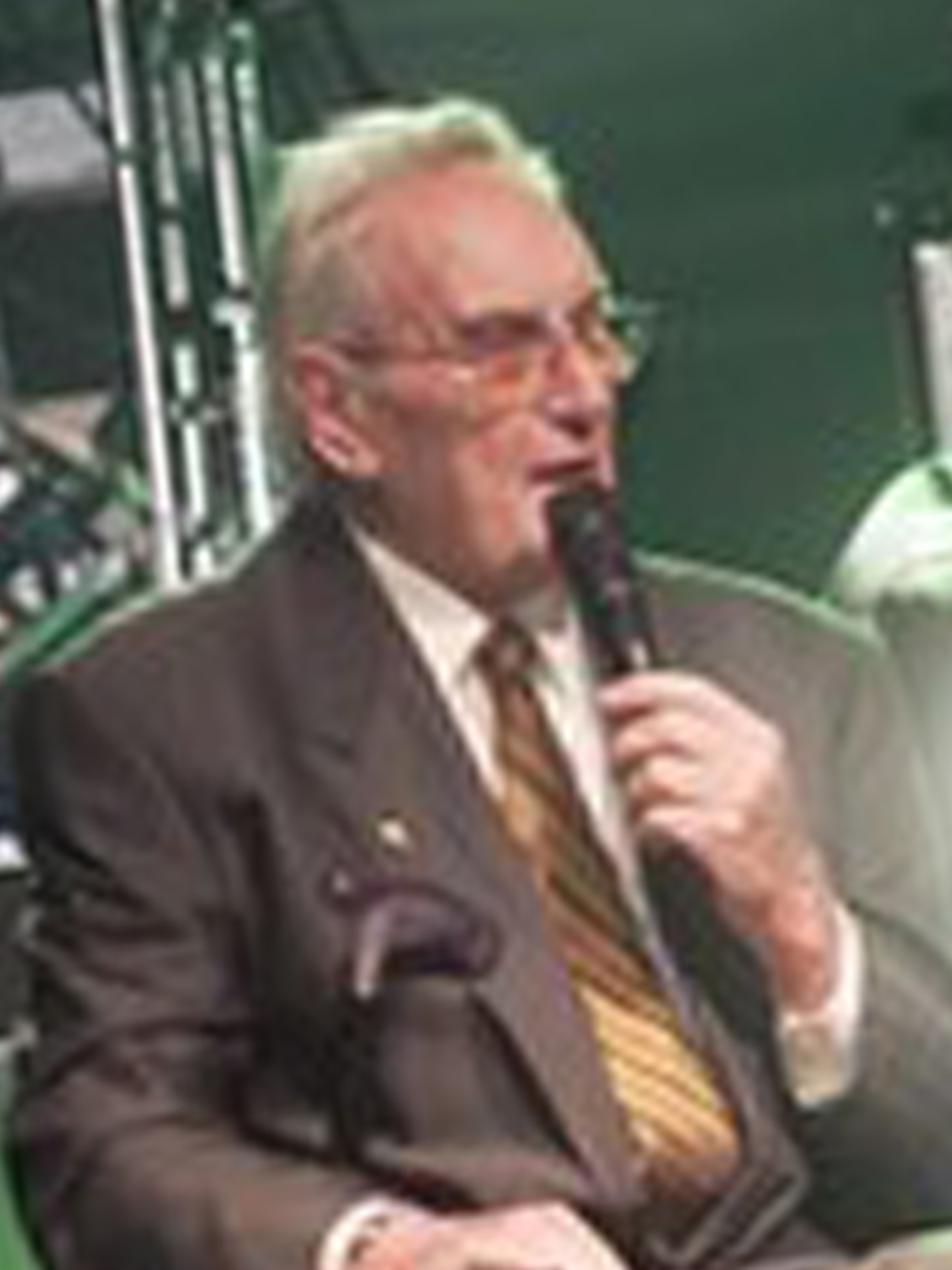
Faidon Matthaiou

Titles

- (Greece) Greek Champion

Roster

- (Greece) Faidon Matthaiou
- (Greece) Ioannis Lambrou
- (Greece) Missas Pantazopoulos
- (Greece) Stelios Arvanitis
- (Greece) Nikos Milas
- (Greece) Petros Dimitropoulos
- (Greece) Alekos Karalis
- (Greece) Vithipoulias
- (Greece) Thanasis Koukopoulos
- (Greece) Kaligeris
- (Greece) Fanis Theofanis
- (Greece) Papatheoharis
- (Greece) Giazimis
- (Greece) Genimatas

== 1950–51 ==
Titles

- (Greece) Greek Champion

Roster

- (Greece) Ioannis Lambrou
- (Greece) Nikos Milas
- (Greece) Faidon Matthaiou
- (Greece) Stelios Arvanitis
- (Greece) Kaligeris
- (Greece) Giorgos Oven
- (Greece) Papatheoharis
- (Greece) Fanis Theofanis
- (Greece) Tripos
- (Greece) Vithipoulias
- (Greece) Konidis
- (Greece) Filipou
- (Greece) Yiaximis
- (Greece) Genimatas

== 1953–54 ==
Titles

- (Greece) Greek Champion

Roster

- (Greece) Faidon Matthaiou
- (Greece) Nikos Milas
- (Greece) Stelios Arvanitis
- (Greece) Alekos Karalis
- (Greece) Yiaximis
- (Greece) Varias
- (Greece) Konidis
- (Greece) Yianopoulos
- (Greece) Stamatiou
- (Greece) Giannis Malakates
- (Greece) Kimanis
- (Greece) Panos Koukopoulos
- (Greece) Stelios Tavoularis
- (Greece) Oven

== 1960–61 ==
Titles

- (Greece) Greek Champion

Roster

- (Greece) Panos Koukopoulos
- (Greece) Makridis
- (Greece) Liamis
- (Greece) Petros Panagiotarakos
- (Greece) Zanos
- (Greece) Koutsoukos
- (Greece) Stelios Tavoularis
- (Greece) Papakonstantopoulos
- (Greece) Mandilaris
- (Greece) Dedes
- (Greece) Katsikidis
- (Greece) Nakios
- (Greece) Sitzakis

== 1961–62 ==
Titles

- (Greece) Greek Champion

Roster

- (Greece) Liamis
- (Greece) Stelios Tavoularis
- (Greece) George Vassilakopoulos
- (Greece) Katsikidis
- (Greece) Petros Panagiotarakos
- (Greece) Zanos
- (Greece) Makridis
- (Greece) Antoniadis
- (Greece) Mandilaris
- (Greece) Panagiotidis
- (Greece) Papdimitriou
- (Greece) Panos Koukopoulos

== 1966–67 ==
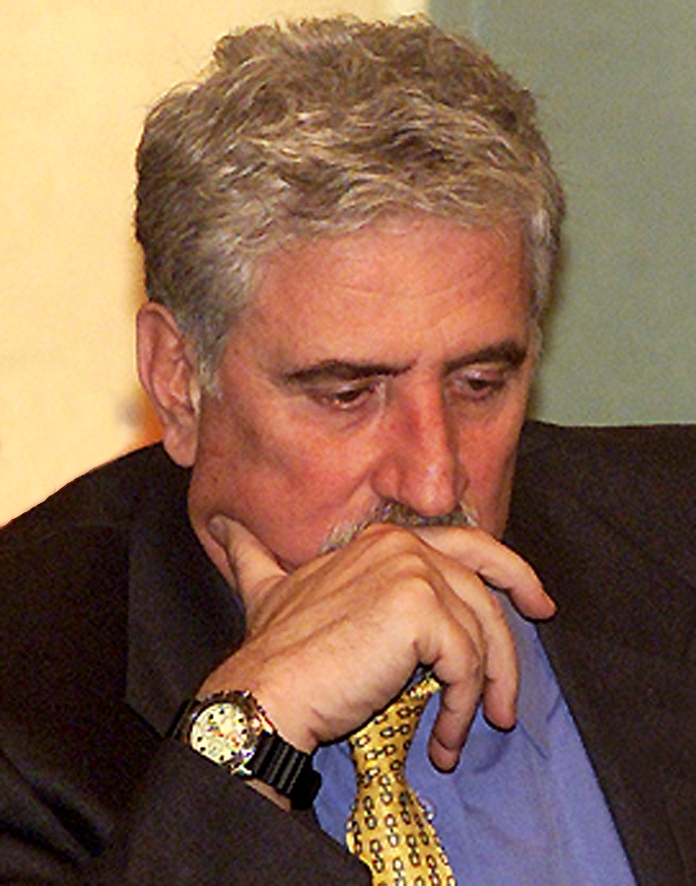
Giorgos Kolokythas

Titles

- (Greece) Greek Champion

Roster

- (Greece) Giorgos Kolokythas
- (Greece) Petros Panagiotarakos
- (Greece) Kostas Politis
- (Greece) Peppas
- (Greece) Michalis Kyritsis
- (Greece) George Vassilakopoulos
- (Greece) Chaikalis
- (Greece) Kouzoupis
- (Greece) Liamis
- (Greece) Lekkakis
- (Greece) Stefanou

== 1970–71 ==
Titles

- (Greece) Greek Champion

Roster

- (Greece) Apostolos Kontos
- (Greece) Takis Koroneos
- (Greece) (United States) Chris Kefalos
- (Greece) Kostas Politis
- (Greece) Dimitris Kokolakis
- (Greece) Charis Papazoglou
- (Greece) Christos Iordanidis
- (Greece) Papantoniou
- (Greece) Michalis Kyritsis

== 1971–72 ==
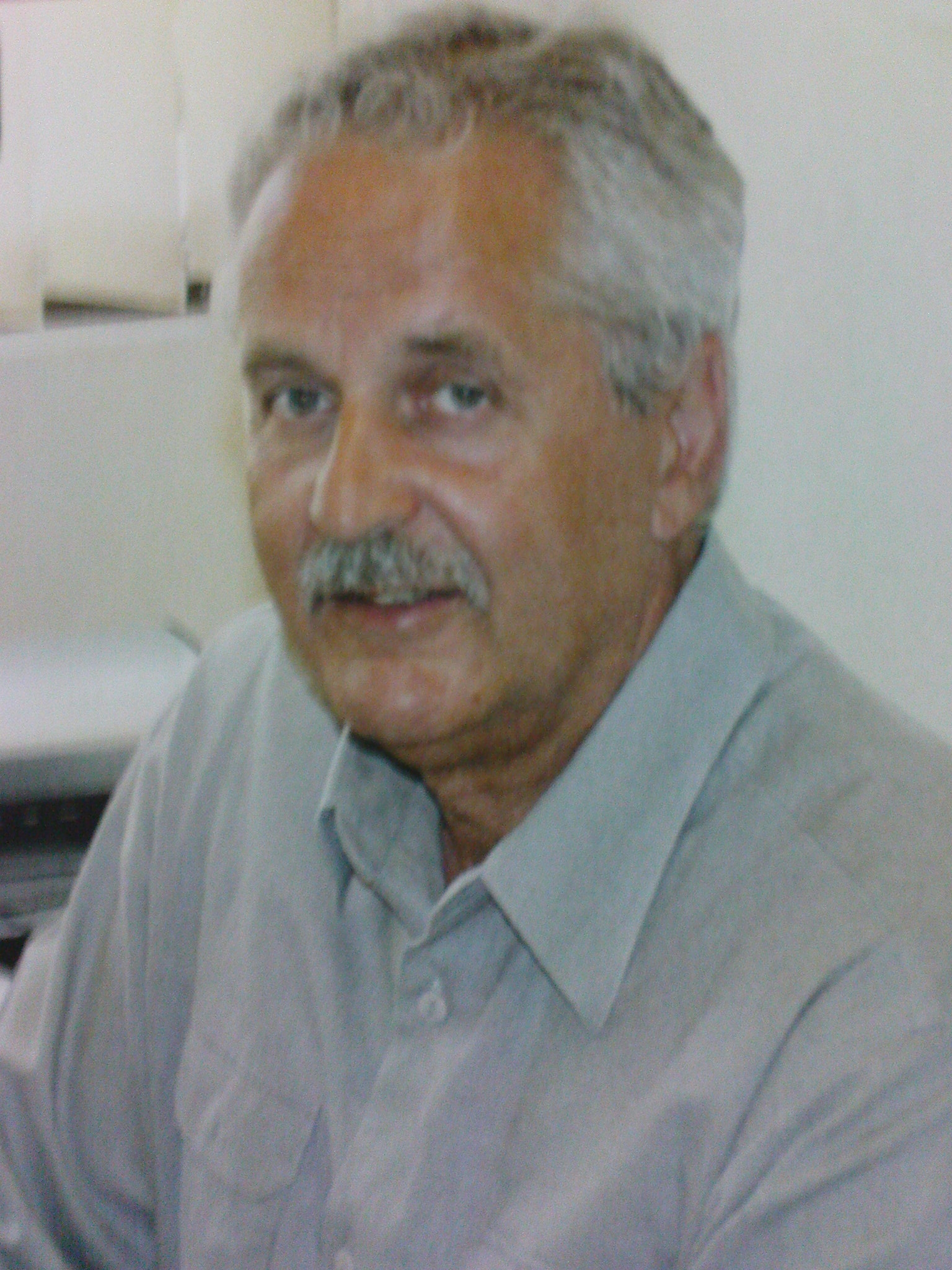
Apostolos Kontos

Titles

- (Greece) Greek Champion

Roster

- (Greece) Apostolos Kontos
- (Greece) Zografos
- (Greece) Zegleris
- (Greece) Takis Koroneos
- (Greece) Dimaras
- (Greece) (United States) Chris Kefalos
- (Greece) Michalis Kyritsis
- (Greece) Dimitris Kokolakis
- (Greece) Charis Papazoglou
- (Greece) Christos Iordanidis
- (Greece) Papantoniou
- (Greece) Petros Panagiotarakos
- (Greece) Chaikalis
- (Greece) Peppas
- (Greece) Paraskevas

== 1972–73 ==
Titles

- (Greece) Greek Champion

Roster

- (Greece) Apostolos Kontos
- (Greece) Singas
- (Greece) Dimitris Kokolakis
- (Greece) Papantoniou
- (Greece) Dimaras
- (Greece) Chaikalis
- (Greece) Christos Iordanidis
- (Greece) (United States) Chris Kefalos
- (Greece) Charis Papazoglou
- (Greece) Houseas
- (Greece) Takis Koroneos
- (Greece) Broustas Costas
- (Greece) Bogdanos
- (Greece) Poulidis
- (Greece) Michelis

== 1973–74 ==
Titles

- (Greece) Greek Champion

Roster

- (Greece) Apostolos Kontos
- (Greece) Christos Iordanidis
- (Greece) (United States) Chris Kefalos
- (Greece) Houseas
- (Greece) Charis Papazoglou
- (Greece) Dimitris Kokolakis
- (Greece) Chaikalis
- (Greece) Papantoniou
- (Greece) Poulidis
- (Greece) Koumanakos
- (Greece) Bogdanos
- (Greece) Dimaras

== 1974–75 ==
Titles

- (Greece) Greek Champion

Roster

- (Greece) Apostolos Kontos
- (Greece) S. Kontos
- (Greece) (United States) Chris Kefalos
- (Greece) Takis Koroneos
- (Greece) Charis Papazoglou
- (Greece) Dimitris Kokolakis
- (Greece) Papantoniou
- (Greece) Memos Ioannou
- (Greece) Kostas Batis
- (Greece) Christos Iordanidis
- (Greece) Kabourakis
- (Greece) Takis Spiliopoulos

== 1976–77 ==
Titles

- (Greece) Greek Champion

Roster

- (Greece) Apostolos Kontos
- (Greece) (United States) Chris Kefalos
- (Greece) Takis Koroneos
- (Greece) Dimitris Kokolakis
- (Greece) Papantoniou
- (Greece) Charis Papazoglou
- (Greece) S. Kontos
- (Greece) Memos Ioannou
- (Greece) Kostas Batis
- (Greece) Kakogeorgiou
- (Greece) Kabourakis
- (Greece) Petrkakis
- (Greece) Christos Iordanidis

== 1978–79 ==
Titles

- (Greece) Greek Cup Winner

Roster

- (Greece) Apostolos Kontos
- (Greece) Papantoniou
- (Greece) Dimitris Kokolakis
- (Greece) Takis Koroneos
- (Greece) (United States) David Stergakos
- (Greece) Kostas Batis
- (Greece) Memos Ioannou
- (Greece) Charis Papazoglou
- (Greece) Christos Iordanidis

== 1979–80 ==
Titles

- (Greece) Greek Champion

Roster

- (Greece) Apostolos Kontos
- (Greece) Dimitris Kokolakis
- (Greece) (United States) David Stergakos
- (Greece) (United States) Kyriakos Vidas
- (Greece) Papantoniou
- (Greece) Memos Ioannou
- (Greece) Charis Papazoglou
- (Greece) Kostas Batis
- (Greece) Garos
- (Greece) Georganas
- (Greece) Takis Koroneos
- (Greece) Kalogeropoulos
- (Greece) Nikos Darivas

== 1980–81 ==
Titles

- (Greece) Greek Champion

Roster

- (Greece) Apostolos Kontos
- (Greece) Takis Koroneos
- (Greece) (United States) David Stergakos
- (Greece) Dimitris Kokolakis
- (Greece) (United States) Kyriakos Vidas
- (Greece) Papantoniou
- (Greece) Katsinis
- (Greece) Garos
- (Greece) Georganas
- (Greece) Memos Ioannou
- (Greece) Kalogeropoulos
- (Greece) Metaxas
- (Greece) Nikos Darivas

== 1981–82 ==
Titles

- (Greece) Greek Champion
- (Greece) Greek Cup Winner

Roster

- (Greece) Apostolos Kontos
- (Greece) (United States) David Stergakos
- (Greece) Dimitris Kokolakis
- (Greece) (United States) Kyriakos Vidas
- (Greece) Takis Koroneos
- (Greece) Memos Ioannou
- (Greece) Katsinis
- (Greece) Papantoniou
- (Greece) Kostas Batis
- (Greece) Georganas
- (Greece) Veneris Alkis
- (Greece) Kalogeropoulos
- (Greece) Garos
- (Greece) Karanasos
- (Greece) Nikos Darivas
- (Lebanon) Roni Sakalis (practice squad)

== 1982–83 ==
Titles

- (Greece) Greek Cup Winner

Roster

- (Greece) Takis Koroneos
- (Greece) (United States) David Stergakos
- (Greece) Liveris Andritsos
- (Greece) Dimitris Kokolakis
- (Greece) (Canada) Tom Kappos
- (Greece) Memos Ioannou
- (Greece) Nikos Darivas
- (Lebanon) Roni Sakalis (practice squad)

== 1983–84 ==
Titles

- (Greece) Greek Champion

Roster

- (Greece) Takis Koroneos
- (Greece) (United States) David Stergakos
- (Greece) Liveris Andritsos
- (Greece) (Canada) Tom Kappos
- (Greece) (United States) Kyriakos Vidas
- (Greece) Giorgos Skropolithas
- (Greece) Memos Ioannou
- (Greece) Tolias
- (Greece) Kalogeropoulos
- (Greece) Politis
- (Greece) Tsantilis
- (Greece) Sotiriou

== 1984–85 ==
Roster

- (Greece) (United States) David Stergakos
- (Greece) Takis Koroneos
- (Greece) (United States) Kyriakos Vidas
- (Greece) Liveris Andritsos
- (Greece) Memos Ioannou
- (Greece) Argyris Papapetrou
- (Greece) Giorgos Skropolithas
- (Greece) Petros Vasilantonakis
- (Greece) Mathiakakis
- (Greece) Christoforos Karanasos

== 1985–86 ==
Titles

- (Greece) Greek Cup Winner

Roster

- 5 (Greece) Skropolithas, Giorgos
- 6 (Greece) Konstantos, Kostas
- 7 (Greece) Andritsos, Liveris
- 8 (Greece) (United States) Vidas, Kyriakos
- 9 (Greece) Petroudakis, Manolis
- 10 (Greece) Papapetrou, Argyris
- 11 (Greece) Darivas, Nikos
- 12 (Greece) (United States) Stergakos, David
- 14 (Greece) Ioannou, Memos
- 15 (Greece) Fragiskatos, Sakis
- Head coach: (Greece) Michalis Kyritsis

== 1986–87 ==
Roster

- 4 (Greece) Missas, Kostas
- 5 (Greece) Skropolithas, Giorgos
- 6 (Greece) Dimakopoulos, Dimitris
- 7 (Greece) Andritsos, Liveris
- 9 (Greece) Pedoulakis, Argyris
- 10 (Greece) Papapetrou, Argyris
- 12 (Greece) (United States) Stergakos, David
- 14 (Greece) Ioannou, Memos
- 15 (Greece) Fragiskatos, Sakis
- Head coach: (Greece) Kostas Mourouzis

== 1987–88 ==
Roster

- 4 (Greece) Missas, Kostas
- 5 (Greece) Skropolithas, Giorgos
- 6 (Greece) Dimakopoulos, Dimitris
- 7 (Greece) Andritsos, Liveris
- 9 (Greece) Pedoulakis, Argyris
- 10 (Greece) Papapetrou, Argyris
- 12 (Greece) (United States) Stergakos, David
- 14 (Greece) Ioannou, Memos
- 15 (Greece) Fragiskatos, Sakis
- head coach: (United States) Richard Dukeshire

== 1988–89 ==
Roster

- 4 (Greece) Pedoulakis, Argyris
- 5 (Greece) Skropolithas, Giorgos
- 6 (Greece) Dimakopoulos, Dimitris
- 7 (Greece) Andritsos, Liveris
- 10 (Greece) Papapetrou, Argyris
- 11 (United States) Jones, Edgar
- 12 (Greece) (United States) Stergakos, David
- 14 (Greece) Ioannou, Memos
- 15 (Greece) Fragiskatos, Sakis
- 32 (United States) Sewell, Tom
- Head coach: (Greece) Michalis Kyritsis

== 1989–90 ==
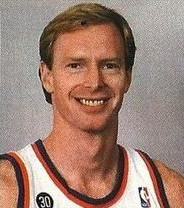
Jeff Cook

Roster

- 4 (Greece) Pedoulakis, Argyris
- 5 (Greece) Skropolithas, Giorgos
- 6 (Greece) Dimakopoulos, Dimitris
- 7 (Greece) Andritsos, Liveris
- 9 (Greece) Koroneos, Takis
- 10 (Greece) Papapetrou, Argyris
- 11 (United States) Jones, Edgar
- 12 (Greece) (United States) Stergakos, David
- 12 (United States) Cook, Jeff (European games)
- 14 (Greece) Ioannou, Memos
- 15 (Greece) Fragiskatos, Sakis
- Head coach: (Greece) Christos Iordanidis

== 1990–91 ==
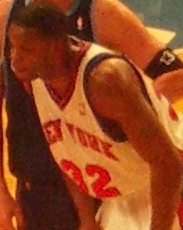
Antonio Davis

Roster

- 5 (Greece) Skropolithas, Giorgos
- 6 (Greece) Dimakopoulos, Dimitris
- 7 (Greece) Andritsos, Liveris
- 8 (Canada) Yearwood, Wayne (European games)
- 9 (Greece) Pedoulakis, Argyris
- 10 (Greece) Papapetrou, Argyris
- 11 (United States) Davis, Antonio
- 12 (Greece) (United States) Stergakos, David
- 13 (Greece) Alvertis, Fragiskos
- 14 (Greece) Kalampakos, Dinos
- Head coach: (Greece) Christos Iordanidis

== 1991–92 ==
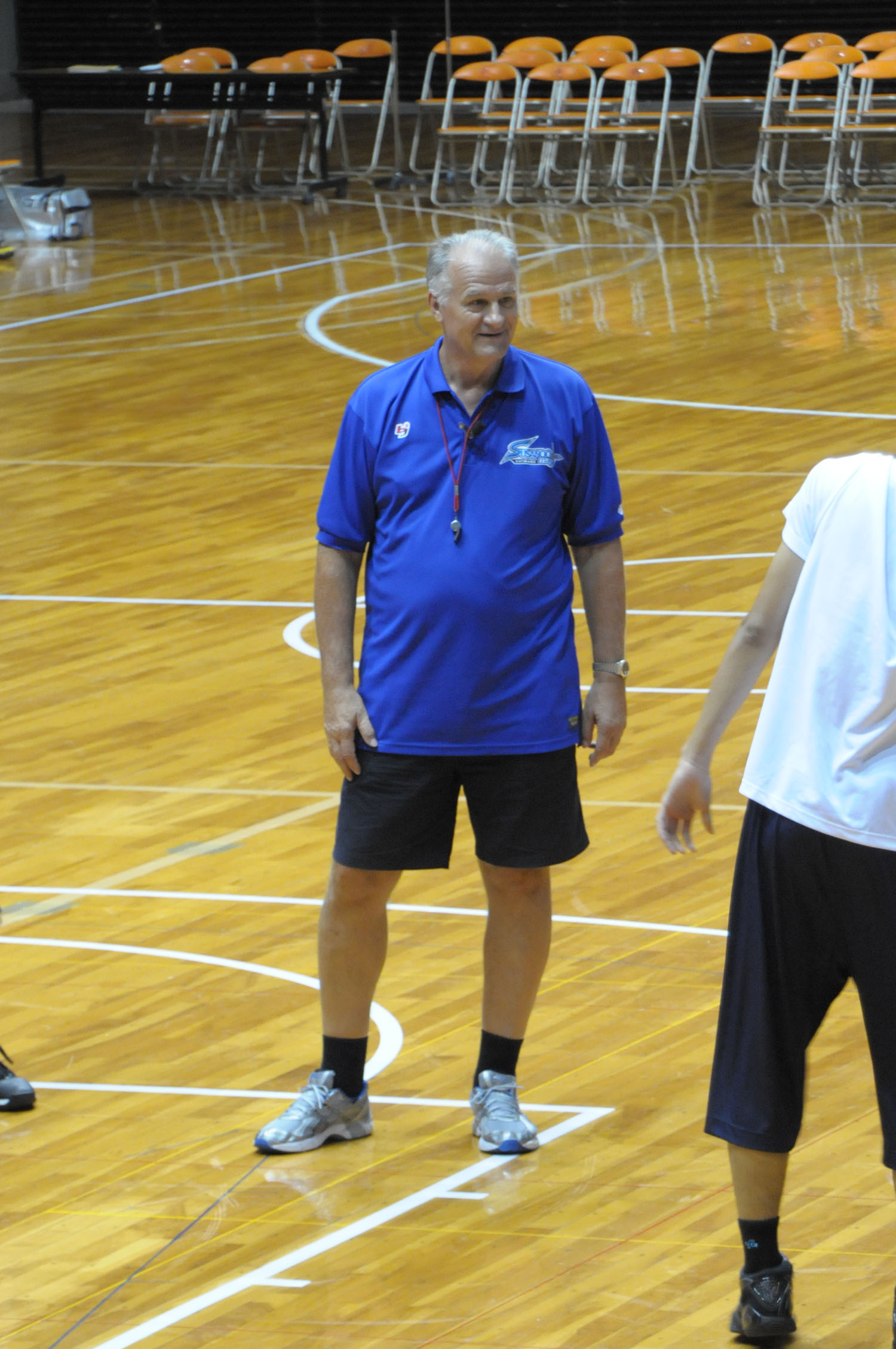
Željko Pavličević

Roster

- 4 (Greece) Georgikopoulos, Giannis
- 5 (Greece) Skropolithas, Giorgos
- 6 (Greece) Gekos, Minas
- 7 (Greece) Andritsos, Liveris
- 8 (Greece) Oikonomou, Nikos
- 9 (Greece) Pedoulakis, Argyris
- 10 (Greece) Papapetrou, Argyris
- 11 (United States) Davis, Antonio
- 12 (United States) Roth, Scott (European games)
- 13 (Greece) Alvertis, Fragiskos
- 14 (Greece) Kalampakos, Dinos
- 15 (Greece) Myriounis, Christos
- Head coach: (Croatia) Željko Pavličević

== 1992–93 ==
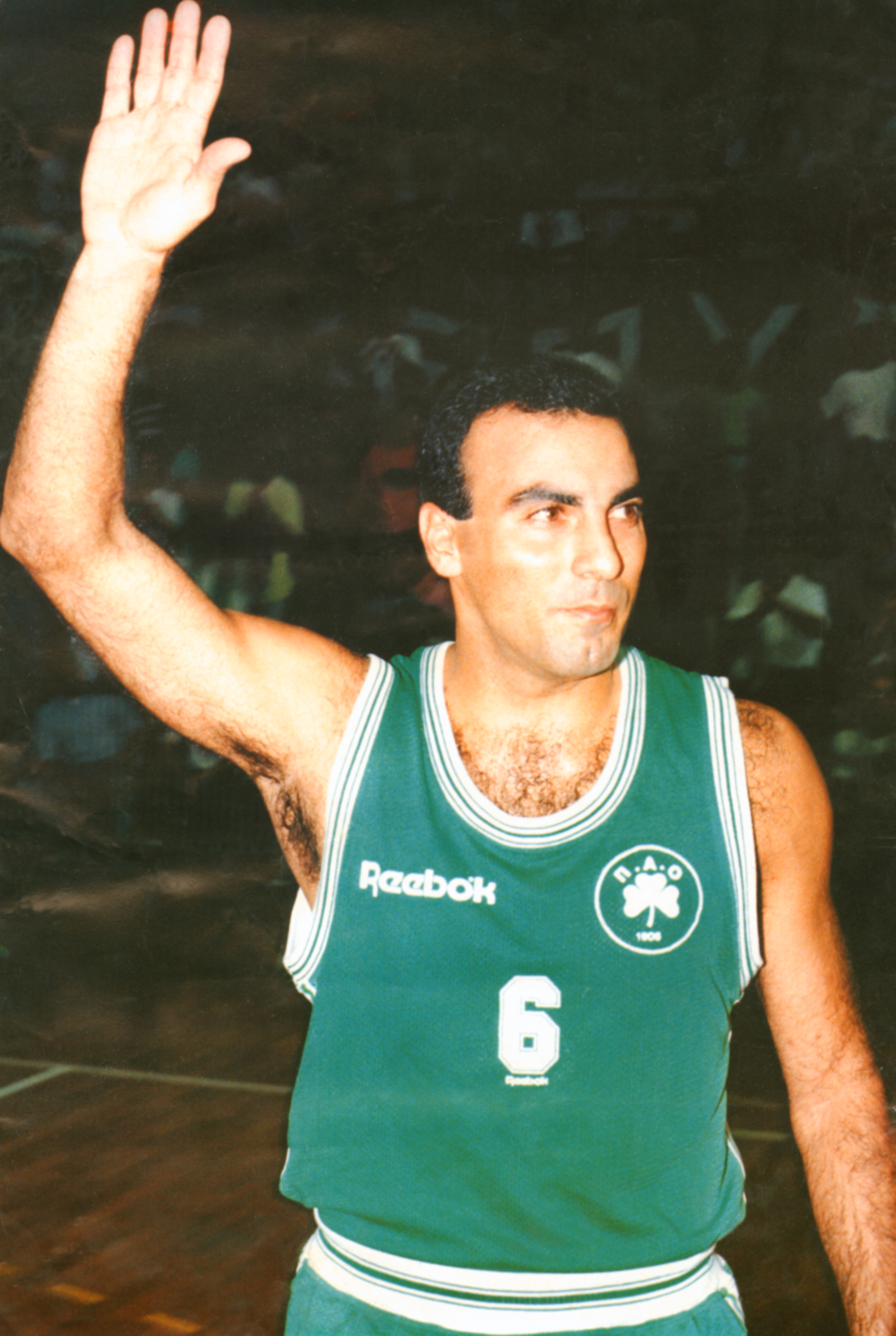
Nikos Galis

Titles

- (Greece) Greek Cup Winner

Roster

- 4 (Greece) Alvertis, Fragiskos
- 5 (Estonia) (Greece) Sokk, Tiit
- 6 (Greece) (United States) Galis, Nikos
- 8 (Greece) Oikonomou, Nikos
- 9 (Greece) Gekos, Minas
- 10 (Greece) Papapetrou, Argyris
- 11 (Croatia) Vranković, Stojko
- 13 (Croatia) Komazec, Arijan
- 14 (Greece) Georgikopoulos, Giannis
- 15 (Greece) Myriounis, Christos
- Head coach: (Croatia) Željko Pavličević

== 1993–94 ==
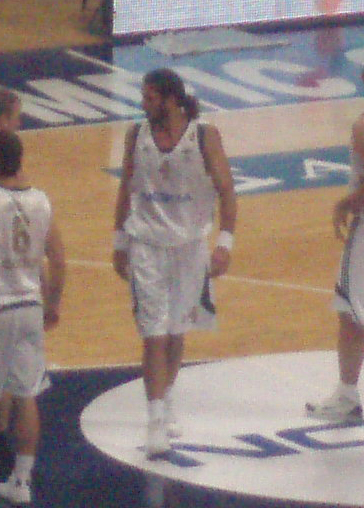
Fragiskos Alvertis

Honors

- (European Union) EuroLeague 3rd place

Roster

- 4 (Greece) Alvertis, Fragiskos
- 5 (Estonia) (Greece) Sokk, Tiit
- 6 (Greece) (United States) Galis, Nikos
- 7 (Greece) Patavoukas, Kostas
- 8 (Greece) Oikonomou, Nikos
- 9 (Greece) Gekos, Minas
- 10 (Ukraine) Volkov, Alexander
- 11 (Croatia) Vranković, Stojko
- 12 (Estonia) (Greece) Kuusma, Aivar
- 13 (Greece) Papagiannis, Giannis
- 14 (Greece) Georgikopoulos, Giannis
- 15 (Greece) Myriounis, Christos
- 16 (Greece) Chrysanthopoulos, Giorgos
- 17 (Greece) Kourlis, Dionysis
- Head coach: (Croatia) Željko Pavličević
- Head coach: (Greece) Kostas Politis

== 1994–95 ==
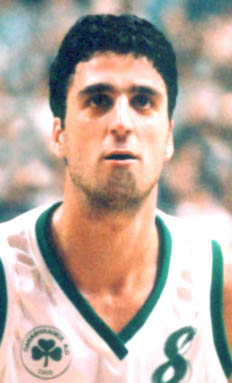
Nikos Oikonomou

Honors

- (European Union) EuroLeague 3rd place

Roster

- 4 (Greece) Alvertis, Fragiskos
- 5 (Estonia) (Greece) Sokk, Tiit
- 6 (Greece) (United States) Galis, Nikos
- 7 (Greece) Patavoukas, Kostas
- 8 (Greece) Oikonomou, Nikos
- 9 (Federal Republic of Yugoslavia) Paspalj, Žarko
- 10 (Greece) Giannakis, Panagiotis
- 11 (Croatia) Vranković, Stojko
- 12, 6 (Estonia) (Greece) Kuusma, Aivar
- 13 (Greece) Papagiannis, Giannis
- 14 (Federal Republic of Yugoslavia) (Greece) Pecarski, Miroslav
- 15 (Greece) Myriounis, Christos
- 16 (Greece) Georgikopoulos, Giannis
- 17 (Greece) Kourlis, Dionysis
- 18 (Greece) Chrysanthopoulos, Giorgos
- Head coach: (Greece) Kostas Politis
- Head coach: (Greece) Efthimis Kioumourtzoglou

== 1995–96 ==
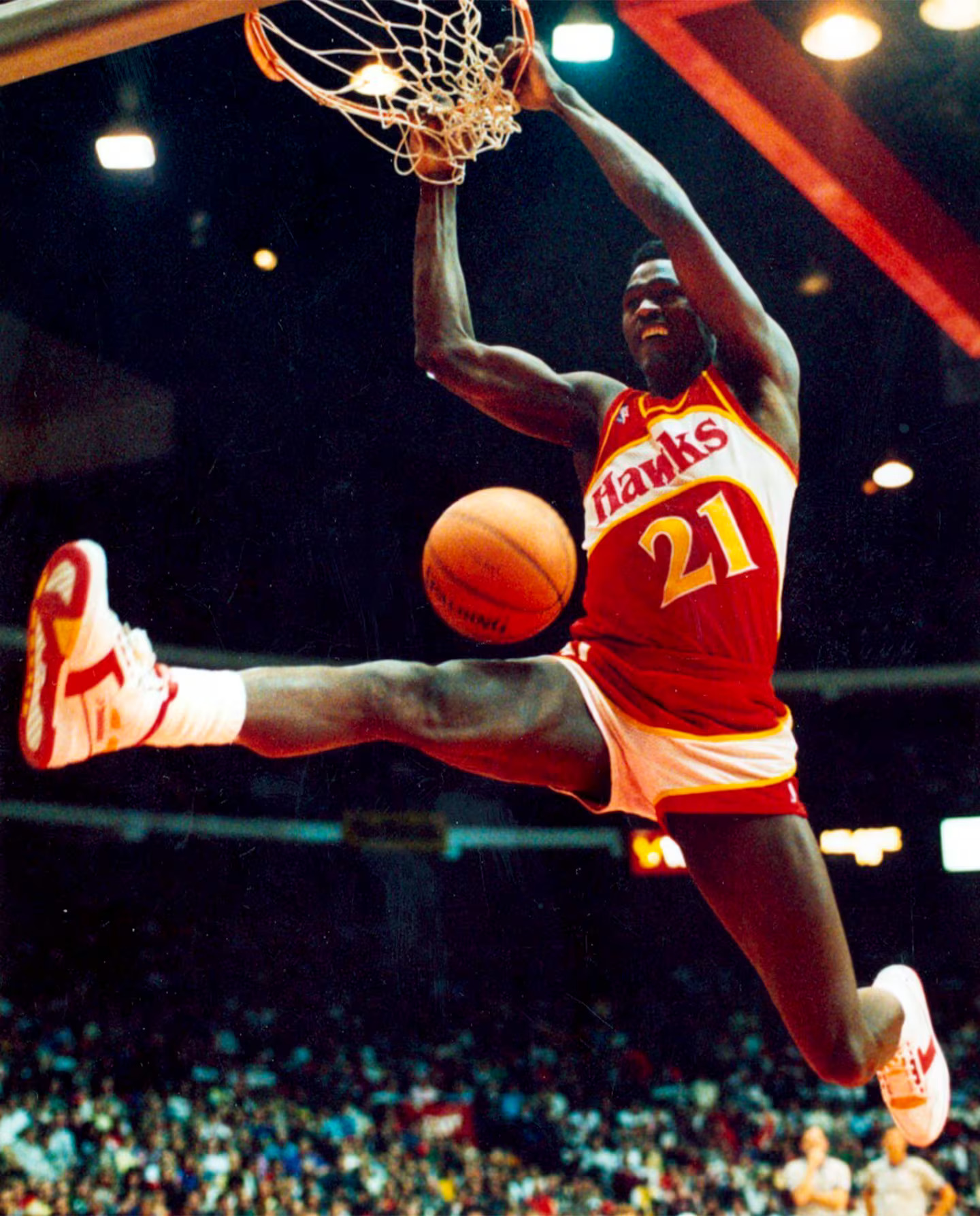
Dominique Wilkins

=== Titles ===
- (European Union) EuroLeague Champion
- (Greece) Greek Cup Winner

Roster

- 4 (Greece) Alvertis, Fragiskos
- 6 (Greece) Vourtzoumis, Vangelis
- 7 (Greece) Patavoukas, Kostas
- 8 (Greece) Oikonomou, Nikos
- 9 (Greece) (United States) Korfas, Jon
- 10 (Greece) Giannakis, Panagiotis
- 11 (Croatia) Vranković, Stojko
- 12 (United States) Wilkins, Dominique
- 13 (Greece) Stavrakopoulos, Tzanis
- 14 (Federal Republic of Yugoslavia) (Greece) Pecarski, Miroslav
- 15 (Greece) Myriounis, Christos
- Head coach: (Federal Republic of Yugoslavia) Božidar Maljković

== 1996–97 ==
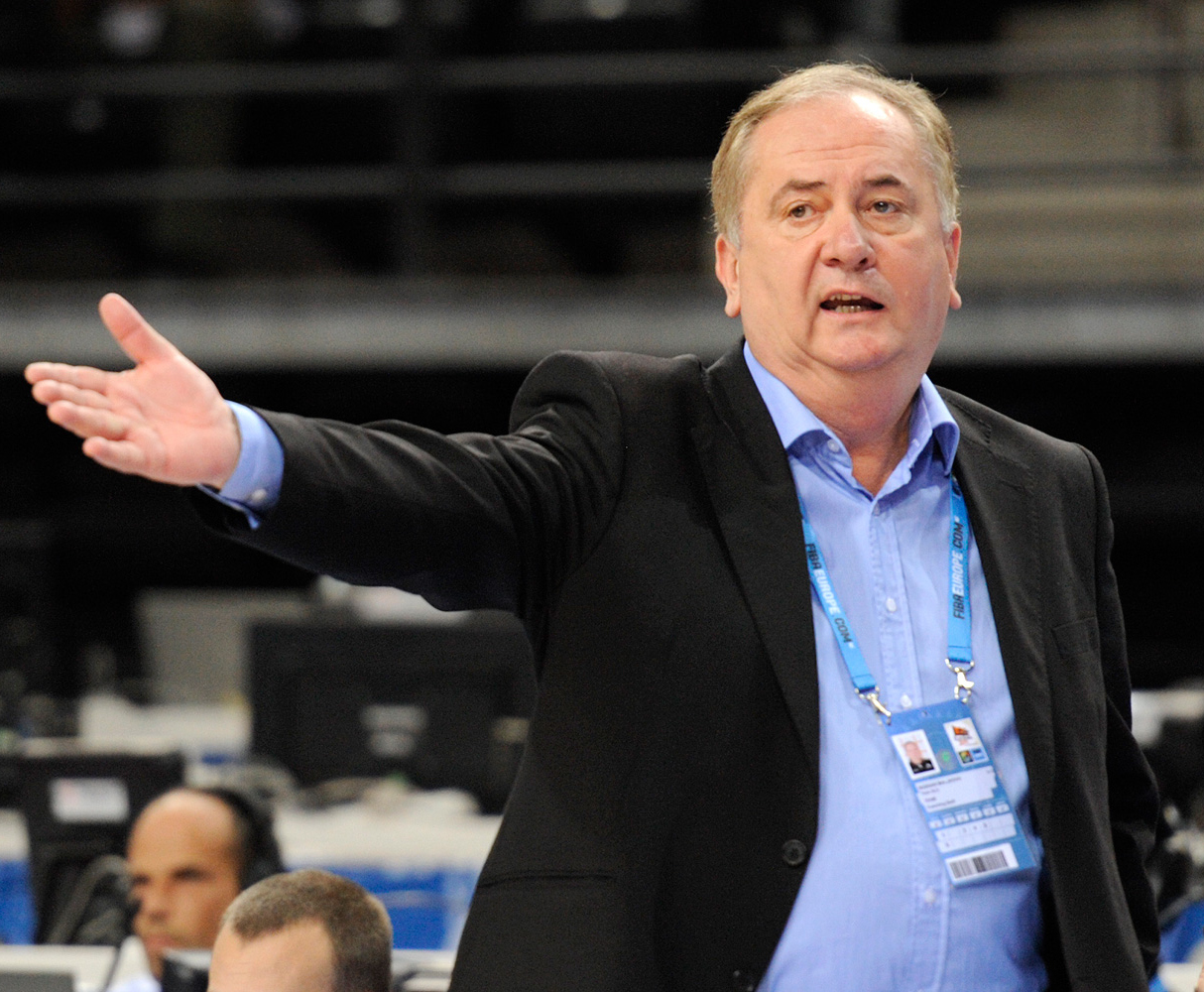
Božidar Maljković

=== Titles ===
- FIBA Intercontinental Cup Champion

Roster

- 4 (Greece) Alvertis, Fragiskos
- 5 (Greece) Vourtzoumis, Vangelis
- 6 (Germany) Koch, Michael
- 7 (Greece) (United States) Korfas, Jon
- 8 (Greece) Oikonomou, Nikos
- 9 (United States) Dinkins, Byron
- 10 (Argentina) (Italy) Nicola, Marcelo
- 11 (Argentina) (Italy) Sconochini, Hugo
- 12 (Federal Republic of Yugoslavia) Marković, Saša
- 13 (Spain) Martínez, Ferran
- 14 (United States) Salley, John
- 14 (Nigeria) Nwosu, Julius (replaced John Salley)
- 15 (England) (United States) Amaechi, John
- 16 (Greece) Skoutaris, Leonidas
- 17 (Greece) Georgikopoulos, Giannis
- (United States) Avent, Anthony
- Head coach: (Federal Republic of Yugoslavia) Božidar Maljković
- Head coach: (Greece) Michalis Kyritsis (second part of season)

== 1997–98 ==
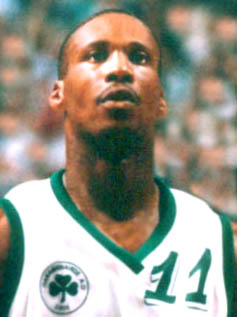
Byron Scott

=== Titles ===
- (Greece) Greek Champion

Roster

- 4 (Greece) Alvertis, Fragiskos
- 5 (Greece) Kalaitzis, Giorgos
- 6 (Germany) Koch, Michael
- 7 (Greece) Patavoukas, Kostas
- 8 (Greece) Oikonomou, Nikos
- 9 (Greece) Fotsis, Antonis
- 10 (England) Branch, Johnny (1997)
- 10 (Greece) Vourtzoumis, Vangelis (1998)
- 11 (United States) Scott, Byron
- 12 (Germany) Hupmann, Sascha
- 13 (Spain) Martínez, Ferran
- 14 (Croatia) Rađa, Dino
- 15 (Greece) Christodoulou, Fanis
- 16 (Greece) Glyniadakis, Andreas
- Head coach: (Slovenia) (Greece) Lefteris Subotić

== 1998–99 ==
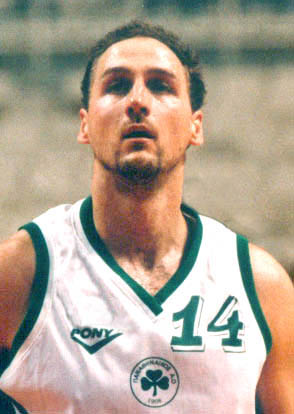
Dino Rađa

=== Titles ===
- (Greece) Greek Champion

Roster

- 4 (Greece) Alvertis, Fragiskos
- 5 (Greece) Kalaitzis, Giorgos
- 6 (Germany) Koch, Michael
- 7 (Greece) Patavoukas, Kostas
- 8 (Greece) Oikonomou, Nikos
- 9 (Italy) Gentile, Nando
- 10 (Federal Republic of Yugoslavia) Bodiroga, Dejan
- 11 (Greece) Boudouris, Nikos
- 12 (Germany) Hupmann, Sascha
- 13 (Republic of Ireland) Burke, Patrick
- 14 (Croatia) Rađa, Dino
- 15 (Greece) Maglos, Kostas
- 16 (Greece) Anthis, Alexandros
- Head coach: (Slovenia) (Greece) Lefteris Subotić

== 1999–00 ==
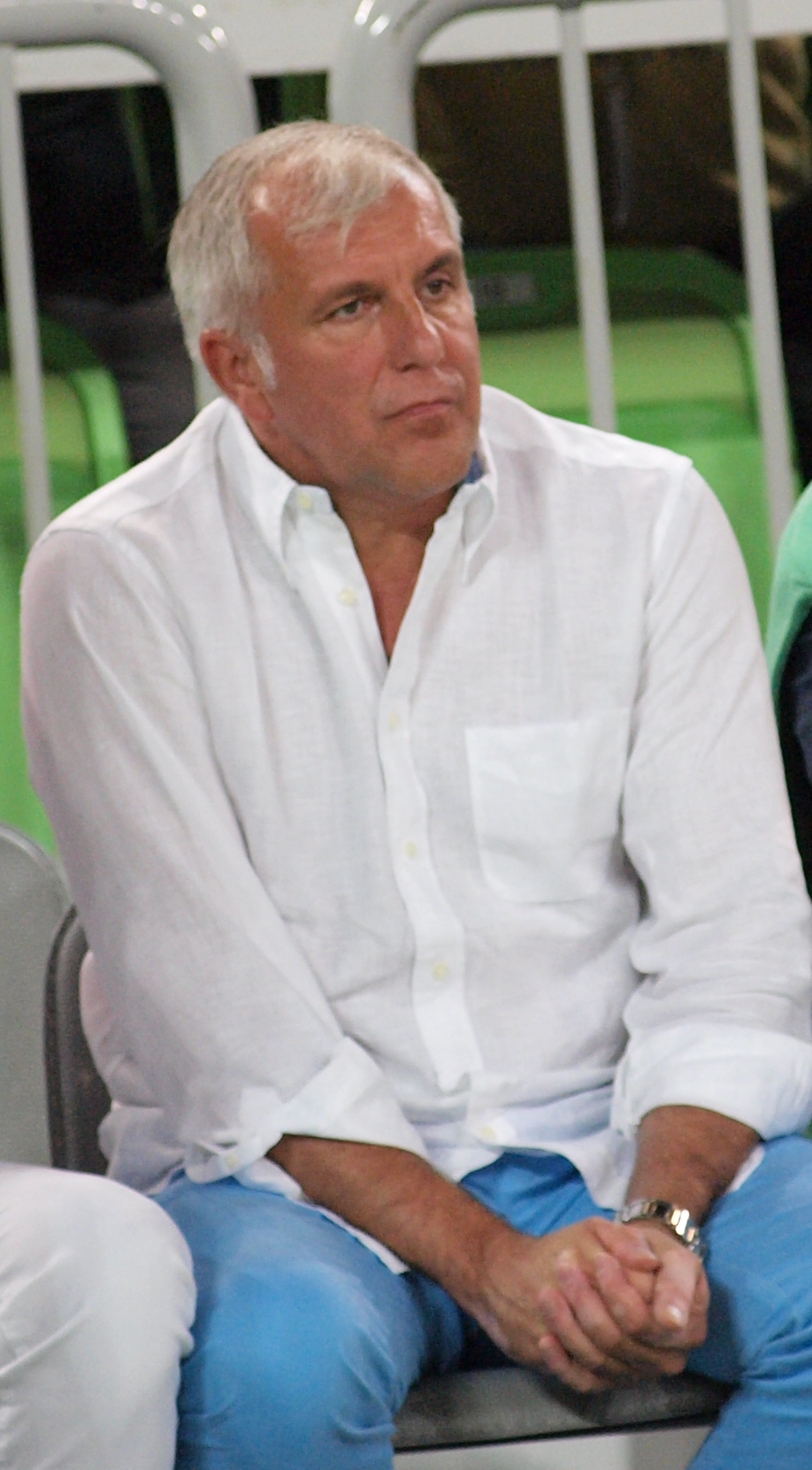
Željko Obradović

=== Titles ===
- (European Union) EuroLeague Champion
- (Greece) Greek Champion

Roster

- 4 (Greece) Alvertis, Fragiskos
- 5 (Greece) Kalaitzis, Giorgos
- 6 (Germany) Koch, Michael
- 7 (United States) Rogers, Johnny
- 8 (Greece) Fotsis, Antonis
- 9 (Italy) Gentile, Nando
- 10 (Federal Republic of Yugoslavia) Bodiroga, Dejan
- 11 (Greece) Boudouris, Nikos
- 12 (Federal Republic of Yugoslavia) Rebrača, Željko
- 13 (Republic of Ireland) Burke, Patrick
- 14 (Israel) Kattash, Oded
- 15 (Greece) Karagkoutis, Giorgos
- 16 (Greece) Glyniadakis, Andreas
- 19 (Greece) Maglos, Kostas
- Head coach: (Federal Republic of Yugoslavia) Željko Obradović
- Assistant coach: (Greece) Dimitris Itoudis

== 2000–01 ==
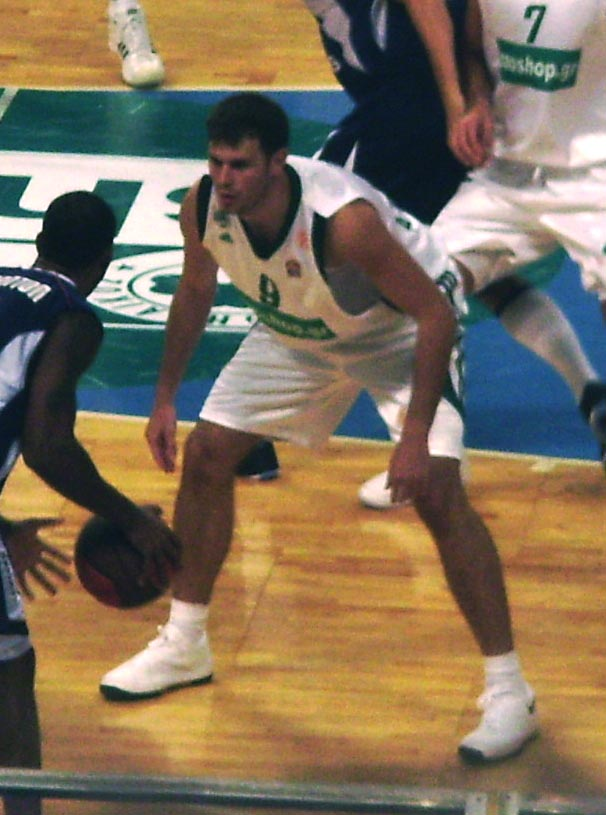
Antonis Fotsis

=== Titles ===
- (European Union) FIBA SuproLeague Finalist
- (Greece) Greek Champion

Roster

- 4 (Greece) Alvertis, Fragiskos
- 5 (Greece) Kalaitzis, Giorgos
- 6 (Germany) Koch, Michael
- 7 (United States) (Spain) Rogers, Johnny
- 8 (Greece) Fotsis, Antonis
- 9 (Italy) Gentile, Nando
- 10 (Federal Republic of Yugoslavia) Bodiroga, Dejan
- 11 (United States) (Spain) Middleton, Darryl
- 12 (Federal Republic of Yugoslavia) Rebrača, Željko
- 13 (Republic of Ireland) Burke, Patrick
- 14 (Israel) Kattash, Oded
- 15 (Greece) Balogiannis, Giorgos
- 16 (Greece) Glyniadakis, Andreas
- 17 (Greece) Rodostoglou, Giannis
- 19 (Greece) Voulgaridis, Marios
- Head coach: (Federal Republic of Yugoslavia) Željko Obradović
- Assistant coach: (Greece) Dimitris Itoudis

== 2001–02 ==
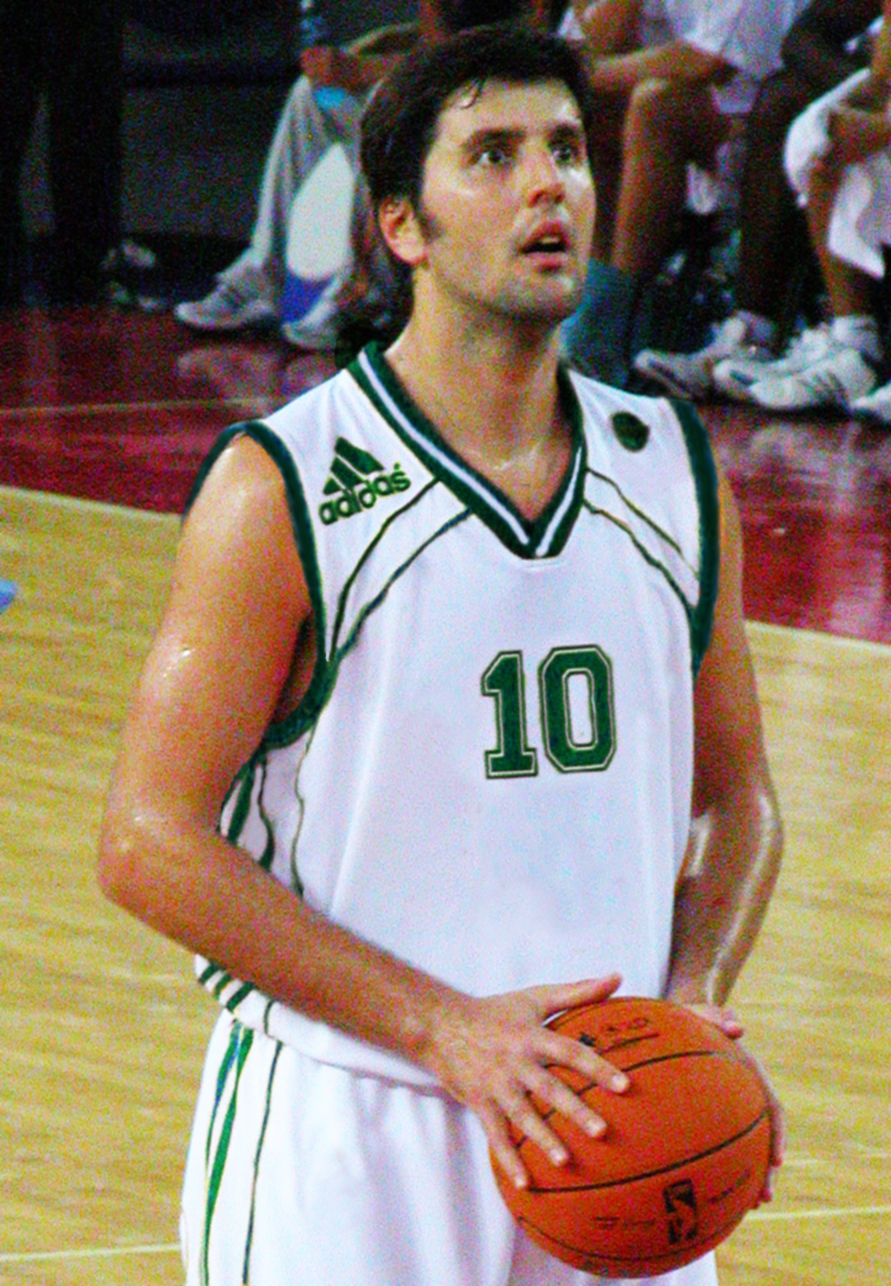
Dejan Bodiroga

=== Titles ===
- (European Union) EuroLeague Champion 2001–02

Roster

- 4 (Greece) Alvertis, Fragiskos
- 5 (Greece) Kalaitzis, Giorgos
- 6 (Greece) Sioutis, Giannis
- 7 (United States) (Spain) Rogers, Johhny
- 8 (Croatia) (Bosnia and Herzegovina) Mulaomerović, Damir
- 9 (Greece) Balogiannis, Giorgos
- 10 (Federal Republic of Yugoslavia) Bodiroga, Dejan
- 11 (United States) (Spain) Middleton, Darryl
- 12 (Turkey) Kutluay, İbrahim
- 13 (United States) Albano, Corey
- 14 (Greece) Papadopoulos, Lazaros
- 15 (Greece) Giannoulis, Giannis
- 16 (Argentina) (Spain) Sánchez, Pepe
- 17 (Greece) Vidalis, Christos
- 18 (Greece) Theos, Serafim
- 19 (Greece) Svoronos, Michalis
- Head coach: (Federal Republic of Yugoslavia) Željko Obradović
- Assistant coach: (Greece) Dimitris Itoudis

== 2002–03 ==
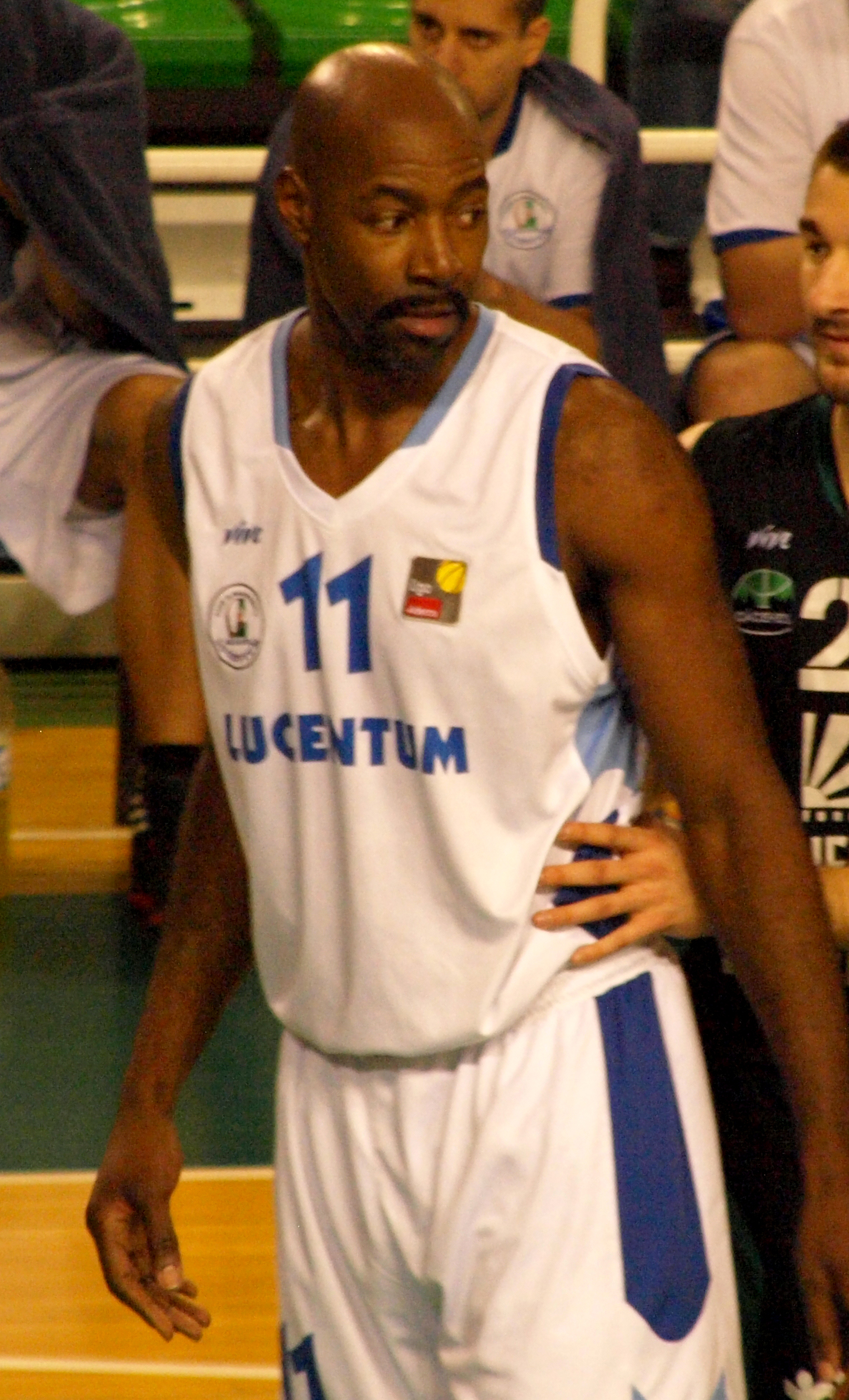
Darryl Middleton

=== Titles ===
- (Greece) Greek Champion
- (Greece) Greek Cup Winner

Roster

- 4 (Greece) Alvertis, Fragiskos
- 5 (Greece) Kalaitzis, Giorgos
- 6 (Greece) Papadopoulos, Lazaros
- 7 (Slovenia) Lakovič, Jaka
- 8 (Greece) Fotsis, Antonis
- 9 (Greece) Balogiannis, Giorgos
- 10 (Turkey) Kutluay, İbrahim
- 11 (United States) (Spain) Middleton, Darryl
- 12 (Greece) Tsartsaris, Kostas
- 13 (Croatia) Žuža, Jurica
- 14 (United States) (Slovenia) McDonald, Ariel
- 15 (United States) Buford, Rodney
- 17 (Greece) Vidalis, Christos
- Head coach: (Federal Republic of Yugoslavia) Željko Obradović
- Assistant coach: (Greece) Dimitris Itoudis

== 2003–04 ==
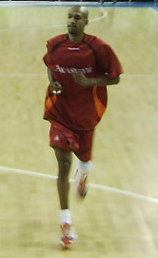
Ariel McDonald

=== Titles ===
- (Greece) Greek Champion

Roster

- 4 (Greece) Alvertis, Fragiskos
- 5 (Greece) Kalaitzis, Giorgos
- 6 (Greece) Papanikolaou, Dimitris
- 7 (Slovenia) Lakovič, Jaka
- 8 (United States) Batiste, Mike
- 9 (Greece) Maslarinos, Giorgos
- 10 (Greece) Chatzivrettas, Nikos
- 11 (United States) (Spain) Middleton, Darryl
- 12 (Greece) Tsartsaris, Kostas
- 13 (Greece) Gagaloudis, Ioannis
- 14 (United States) (Slovenia) McDonald, Ariel
- 15 (United States) Jones, Kenyon
- 16 (Greece) (Serbia and Montenegro) Šakota, Dušan
- 18 (Bosnia and Herzegovina) Mujezinović, Haris
- Head coach: (Serbia and Montenegro) Željko Obradović
- Assistant coach: (Greece) Dimitris Itoudis

== 2004–05 ==
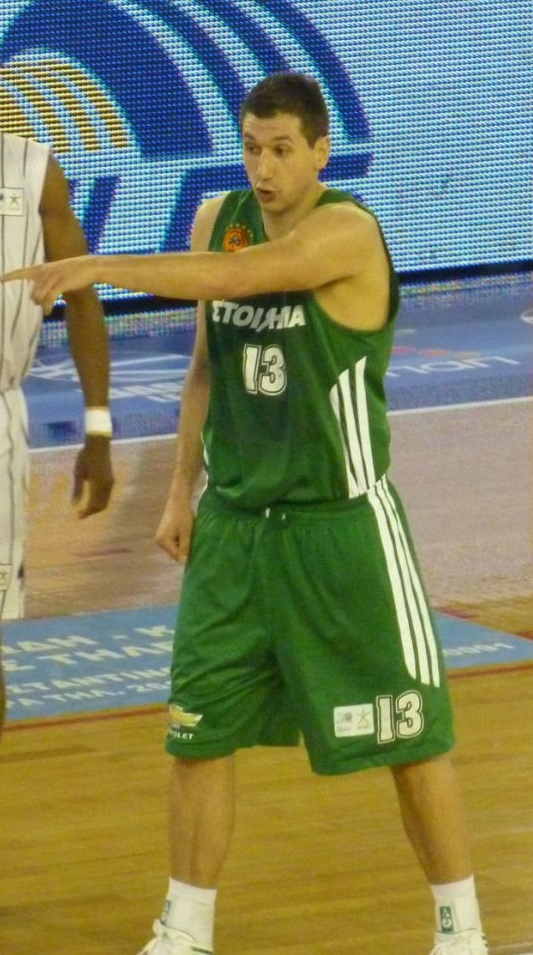
Dimitris Diamantidis

=== Titles ===
- (Greece) Greek Champion
- (Greece) Greek Cup Winner

Honors

- (European Union) EuroLeague 3rd place

Roster

- 4 (Greece) Alvertis, Fragiskos
- 5 (Greece) Kalaitzis, Giorgos
- 6 (Greece) Papanikolaou, Dimitris
- 7 (Slovenia) Lakovič, Jaka
- 8 (United States) Batiste, Mike
- 9 (Germany) Femerling, Patrick
- 10 (Greece) Chatzivrettas, Nikos
- 11 (United States) (Spain) Middleton, Darryl
- 12 (Greece) Tsartsaris, Kostas
- 13 (Greece) Diamantidis, Dimitris
- 14 (Serbia and Montenegro) Šćepanović, Vlado
- 15 (United States) Baxter, Lonny
- 16 (Greece) Xanthopoulos, Vassilis
- 18 (Greece) (Serbia and Montenegro) Šakota, Dušan
- 19 (Turkey) Kutluay, İbrahim
- 30 (United States) Murray, Tracy
- Head coach: (Serbia and Montenegro) Željko Obradović
- Assistant coach: (Greece) Dimitris Itoudis

== 2005–06 ==
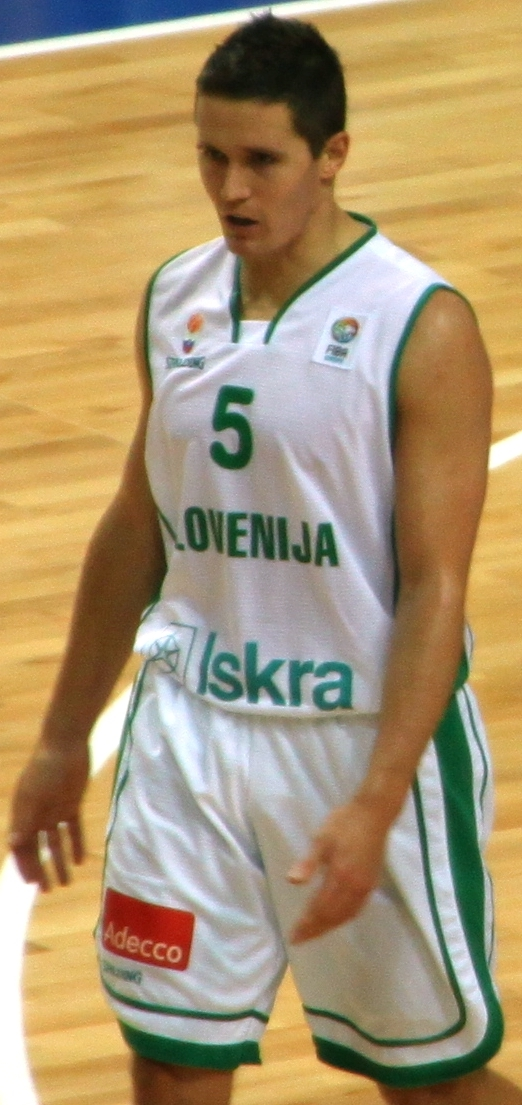
Jaka Lakovič

=== Titles ===
- (Greece) Greek Champion 2005–06
- (Greece) Greek Cup Winner

Honors

- (European Union) EuroLeague Quarter-finalist

Roster

- 4 (Greece) Alvertis, Fragiskos
- 5 (Greece) Kalaitzis, Giorgos
- 6 (Greece) Papanikolaou, Dimitris
- 7 (Slovenia) Lakovič, Jaka
- 8 (United States) Batiste, Mike
- 9 (Germany) Femerling, Patrick
- 10 (Greece) Chatzivrettas, Nikos
- 11 (Greece) Spanoulis, Vassilis
- 12 (Greece) Tsartsaris, Kostas
- 13 (Greece) Diamantidis, Dimitris
- 14 (Serbia and Montenegro) Šćepanović, Vlado
- 15 (Serbia and Montenegro) Tomašević, Dejan
- 16 (Greece) (Serbia and Montenegro) Šakota, Dušan
- 18 (United States) Hunter, Brandon
- Head coach: (Serbia and Montenegro) Željko Obradović
- Assistant coach: (Greece) Dimitris Itoudis

== 2006–07 ==
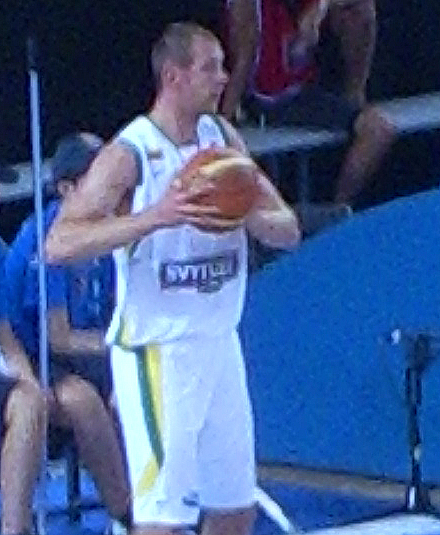
Ramūnas Šiškauskas

=== Titles ===
- (European Union) EuroLeague Champion 2006–07
- (Greece) Greek Champion 2006–07
- (Greece) Greek Cup Winner

Roster

- 4 (Greece) Alvertis, Fragiskos
- 5 (United States) Delk, Tony
- 6 (Greece) Papanikolaou, Dimitris
- 7 (Slovenia) (Italy) Bečirovič, Sani
- 8 (United States) Batiste, Mike
- 9 (Lithuania) Šiškauskas, Ramūnas
- 10 (Greece) Chatzivrettas, Nikos
- 11 (Greece) Dikoudis, Dimos
- 12 (Greece) Tsartsaris, Kostas
- 13 (Greece) Diamantidis, Dimitris
- 14 (Greece) Xanthopoulos, Vassilis
- 15 (Serbia) Tomašević, Dejan
- 16 (Greece) (Serbia) Šakota, Dušan
- 18 (Serbia) Vujanić, Miloš
- 19 (Lithuania) Javtokas, Robertas
- Head coach: (Serbia) Željko Obradović
- Assistant coach: (Greece) Dimitris Itoudis

== 2007–08 ==
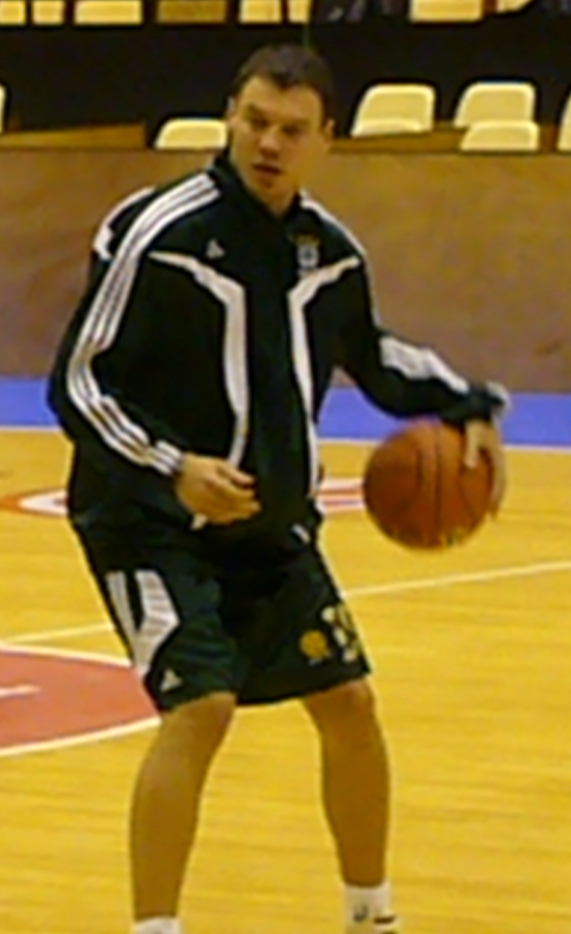
Šarūnas Jasikevičius

=== Titles ===
- (Greece) Greek Champion 2007–08
- (Greece) Greek Cup Winner

Roster

- 4 (Greece) Alvertis, Fragiskos
- 5 (Greece) Perperoglou, Stratos
- 6 (Greece) Spanoulis, Vassilis
- 7 (Slovenia) (Italy) Bečirovič, Sani
- 8 (United States) Batiste, Mike
- 9 (Croatia) Žižić, Andrija
- 10 (Greece) Chatzivrettas, Nikos
- 11 (Greece) Dikoudis, Dimos
- 12 (Greece) Tsartsaris, Kostas
- 13 (Greece) Diamantidis, Dimitris
- 14 (United States) Winston, Kennedy
- 15 (Serbia) Tomašević, Dejan
- 16 (Greece) Tatarounis, Aris
- 17 (Croatia) Prkačin, Nikola
- 19 (Lithuania) Jasikevičius, Šarūnas
- Head coach: (Serbia) Željko Obradović
- Assistant coach: (Greece) Dimitris Itoudis

== 2008–09 ==
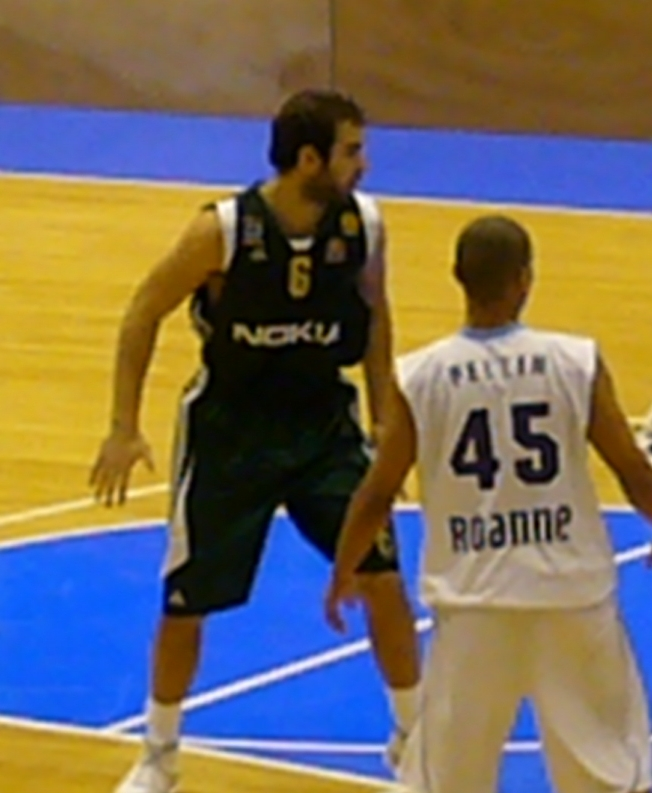
Vassilis Spanoulis

=== Titles ===
- (European Union) EuroLeague Champion 2008–09
- (Greece) Greek Champion 2008–09
- (Greece) Greek Cup Winner

Roster

- 4 (Greece) Alvertis, Fragiskos
- 5 (Serbia) Kecman, Dušan
- 6 (Greece) Spanoulis, Vassilis
- 7 (Greece) Perperoglou, Stratos
- 8 (United States) Batiste, Mike
- 9 (Greece) Fotsis, Antonis
- 10 (Greece) Chatzivrettas, Nikos
- 11 (United States) Nicholas, Drew
- 12 (Greece) Tsartsaris, Kostas
- 13 (Greece) Diamantidis, Dimitris
- 14 (Montenegro) (Serbia) Peković, Nikola
- 15 (Greece) (Serbia) Šakota, Dušan
- 16 (Georgia (country)) Shermadini, Giorgi
- 17 (Greece) Verginis, Dimitris
- 19 (Lithuania) Jasikevičius, Šarūnas
- Head coach: (Serbia) Željko Obradović
- Assistant coach: (Greece) Dimitris Itoudis

== 2009–10 ==
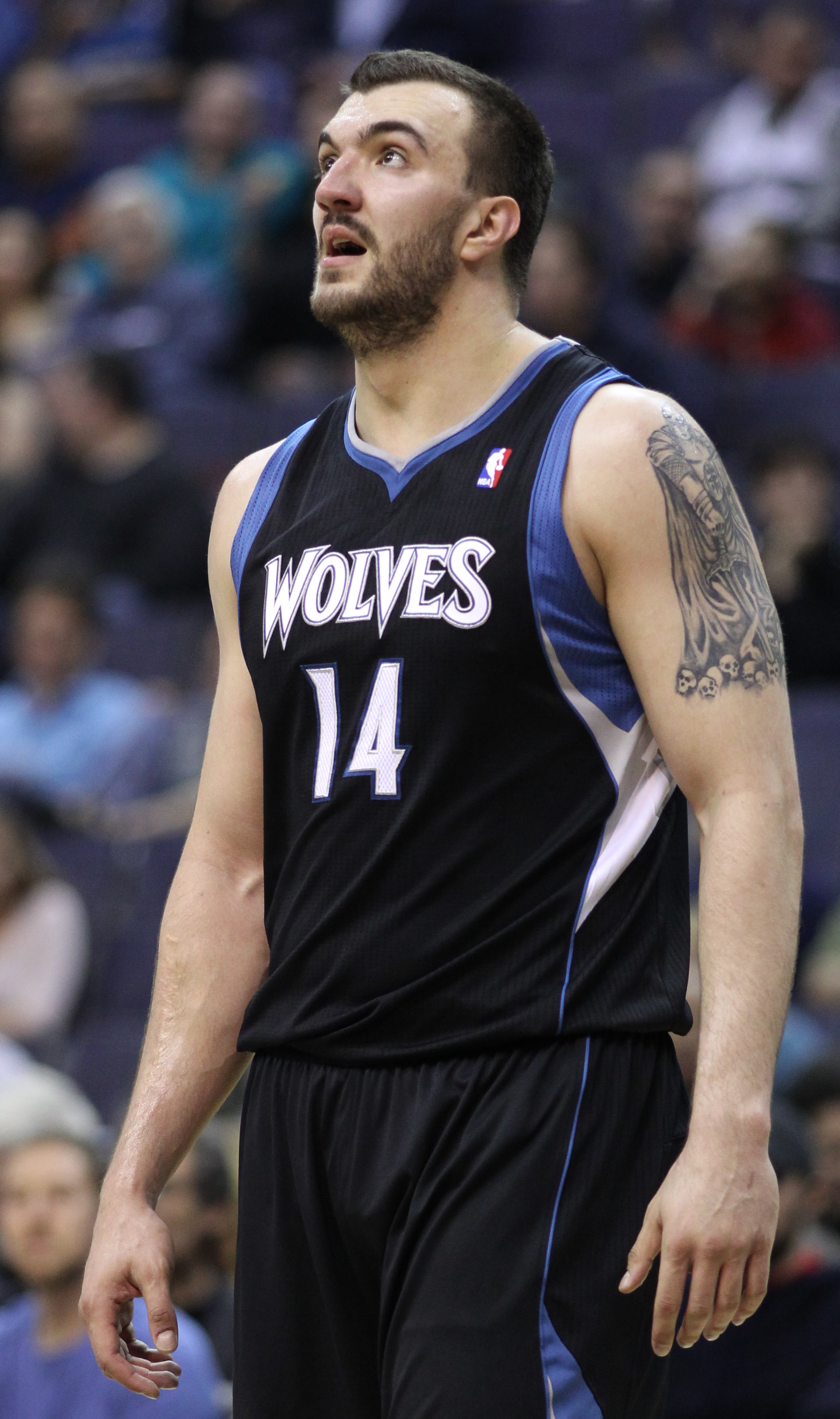
Nikola Peković

=== Titles ===
- (Greece) Greek Champion 2009–10

Roster

- 5 (Serbia) Tepić, Milenko
- 6 (Greece) Spanoulis, Vassilis
- 7 (Greece) Perperoglou, Stratos
- 8 (United States) Batiste, Mike
- 9 (Greece) Fotsis, Antonis
- 10 (Slovenia) (Croatia) Golemac, Jurica
- 10 (United States) Haislip, Marcus (replaced Jurica Golemac)
- 11 (United States) Nicholas, Drew
- 12 (Greece) Tsartsaris, Kostas
- 13 (Greece) Diamantidis, Dimitris
- 14 (Montenegro) (Serbia) Peković, Nikola
- 15 (Greece) (United States) Calathes, Nick
- 16 (Georgia (country)) Shermadini, Giorgi
- 17 (Greece) Verginis, Dimitris
- 17 (Greece) Bogris, Georgios
- 19 (Lithuania) Jasikevičius, Šarūnas
- Head coach: (Serbia) Željko Obradović
- Assistant coach: (Greece) Dimitris Itoudis

== 2010–11 ==
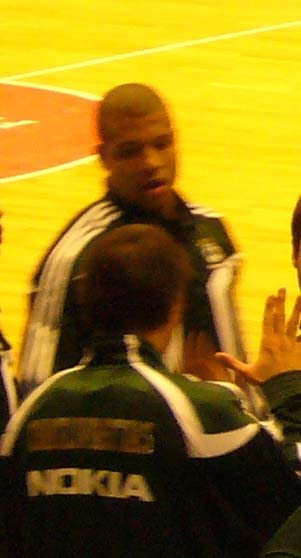
Mike Batiste

=== Titles ===
- (European Union) EuroLeague Champion 2010–11
- (Greece) Greek Champion 2010–11

Roster

- 5 (Serbia) Tepić, Milenko
- 6 (Australia) (Serbia) Marić, Aleks
- 7 (Greece) Perperoglou, Stratos
- 8 (United States) Batiste, Mike
- 9 (Greece) Fotsis, Antonis
- 10 (Central African Republic) Sato, Romain
- 11 (United States) Nicholas, Drew
- 12 (Greece) Tsartsaris, Kostas
- 13 (Greece) Diamantidis, Dimitris
- 14 (Greece) Vougioukas, Ian
- 15 (Greece) (United States) Calathes, Nick
- 16 (Greece) Karamalegkos, Ioannis
- 17 (Greece) Bogris, Georgios
- 18 (Greece) Kaimakoglou, Kostas
- 19 (Greece) Zoumpos, Fotios
- Head coach: (Serbia) Željko Obradović
- Assistant coach: (Greece) Dimitris Itoudis

== 2011–12 ==
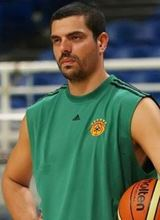
Kostas Tsartsaris

=== Titles ===
- (Greece) Greek Cup Winner

Honors

- (European Union) EuroLeague 4th place

Roster

- 5 (Greece) Zoumpos, Fotios
- 6 (Australia) (Serbia) Marić, Aleks
- 7 (Greece) Perperoglou, Stratos
- 8 (United States) Batiste, Mike
- 9 (United States) (Poland) Logan, David
- 10 (Central African Republic) Sato, Romain
- 11 (Greece) (United States) Calathes, Pat
- 12 (Greece) Tsartsaris, Kostas
- 13 (Greece) Diamantidis, Dimitris
- 14 (Greece) Vougioukas, Ian
- 15 (Greece) (United States) Calathes, Nick
- 16 (Greece) Kyritsis, Alexis
- 17 (United States) Smith, Steven
- 18 (Greece) Kaimakoglou, Kostas
- 19 (Lithuania) Jasikevičius, Šarūnas
- 20 (Greece) Maragkos, Paris
- Head coach: (Serbia) Željko Obradović
- Assistant coach: (Greece) Dimitris Itoudis

== 2012–13 ==
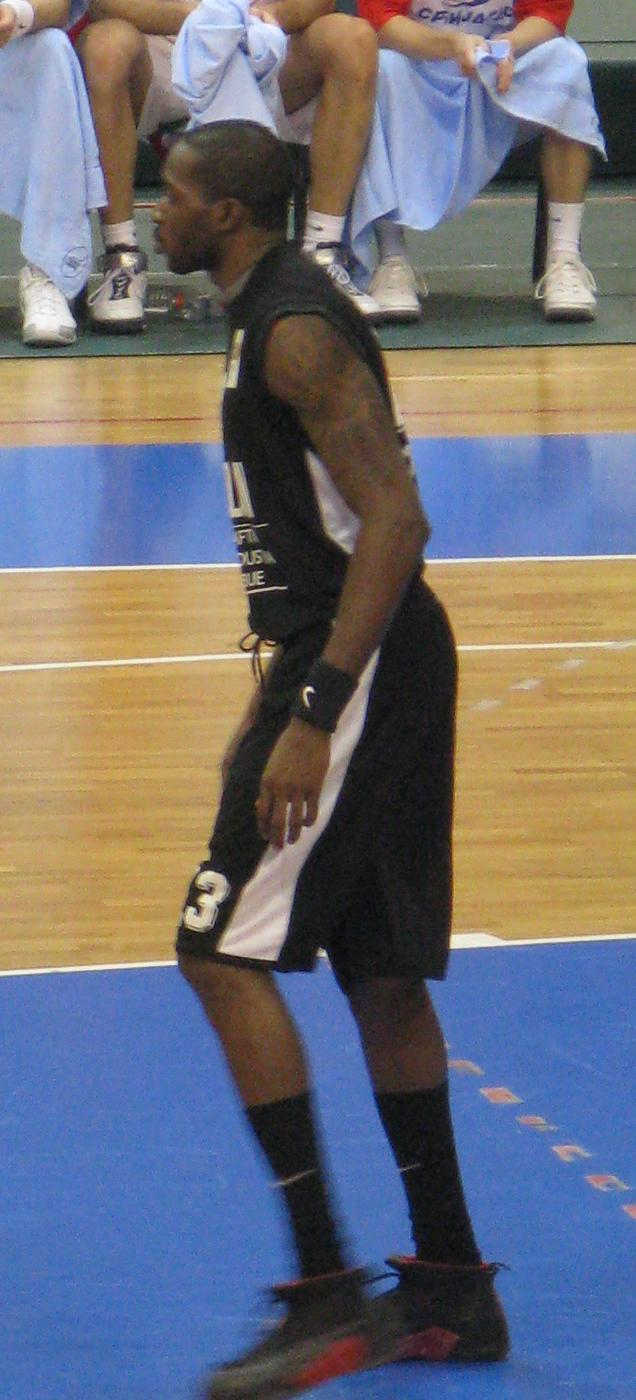
Stéphane Lasme

=== Titles ===
- (Greece) Greek Champion 2012–13
- (Greece) Greek Cup Winner

Roster

- 5 (Greece) Schortsianitis, Sofoklis (Euroleague no.21)
- 6 (Greece) (United States) Bramos, Mike
- 7 (United States) Panko, Andy (traded to Unicaja Málaga for James Gist)
- 7 (United States) Curry, Ramel
- 8 (Lithuania) Mačiulis, Jonas
- 9 (United States) Armstrong, Hilton (released in December)
- 9 (United States) Kapono, Jason
- 10 (Croatia) Ukić, Roko
- 11 (Gabon) Lasme, Stéphane
- 12 (Greece) Tsartsaris, Kostas
- 13 (Greece) Diamantidis, Dimitris
- 14 (United States) Kitchen, Derwin (loaned to KK Cedevita in December)
- 14 (United States) Gist, James
- 15 (United States) (Sweden) Guinn, R.T.
- 15 (United States) Banks, Marcus
- 16 (Greece) Xanthopoulos, Vassilis
- 17 (Greece) Giannopoulos, Charis
- 18 (Greece) Charalampopoulos, Vassilis
- 19 (Greece) Skordilis, Gaios
- 20 (Greece) Diamantakos, Giorgos
- Head coach: (Greece) Argyris Pedoulakis

== 2013–14 ==
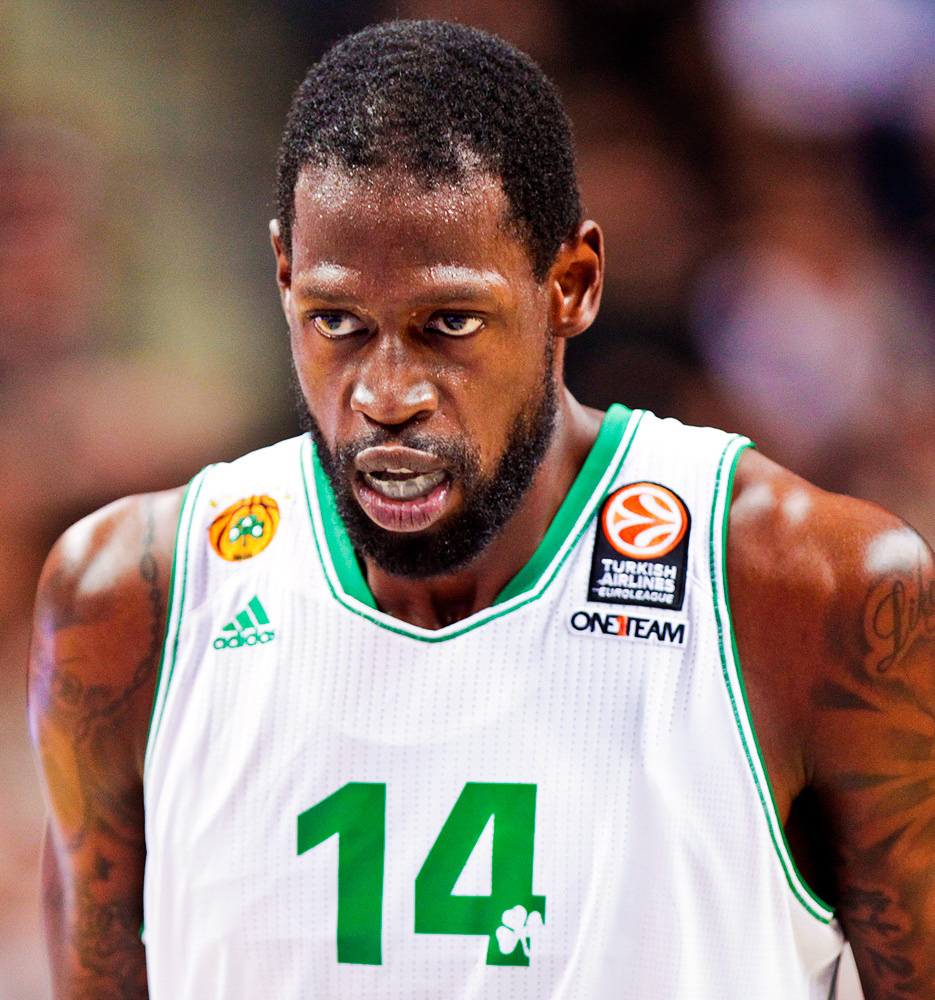
James Gist

=== Titles ===
- (Greece) Greek Champion 2013–14
- (Greece) Greek Cup Winner

Roster

- 5 (Greece) Charalampopoulos, Vassilis
- 6 (Greece) (United States) Bramos, Mike
- 7 (United States) Curry, Ramel
- 8 (United States) Batiste, Mike
- 9 (Greece) Fotsis, Antonis
- 10 (Croatia) Ukić, Roko
- 11 (Gabon) Lasme, Stéphane
- 12 (Greece) Mavrokefalidis, Loukas
- 13 (Greece) Diamantidis, Dimitris
- 14 (United States) Gist, James
- 15 (Greece) Pappas, Nikos
- 16 (Greece) (Serbia) Janković, Vlado
- 17 (China) Ping, Shang
- 18 (Lithuania) Mačiulis, Jonas
- 19 (United States) (Bosnia and Herzegovina) Wright, Zach
- 20 (Greece) Diamantakos, Giorgos
- Head coach: (Greece) Argyris Pedoulakis
- Head coach: (Greece) Fragiskos Alvertis (second part of season)

== 2014–15 ==
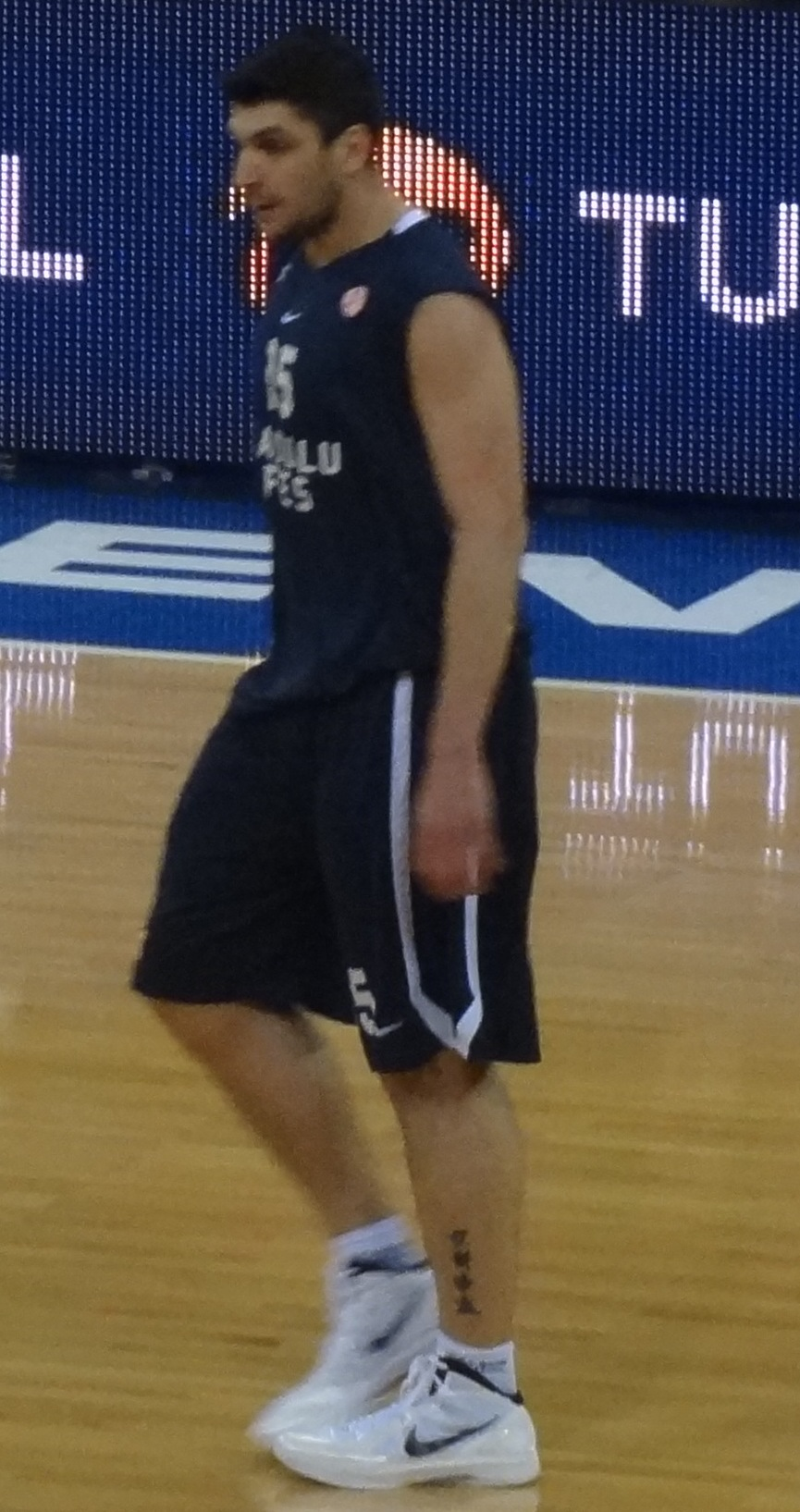
Esteban Batista

=== Titles ===
- (Greece) Greek Cup Winner 2014–15

Roster

- 5 (Greece) Charalampopoulos, Vassilis
- 6 (United States) Slaughter, A.J.
- 7 (Greece) Bochoridis, Lefteris
- 8 (Greece) Janković, Vlado
- 9 (Greece) Fotsis, Antonis
- 10 (United States) (Serbia) Nelson, DeMarcus
- 11 (Greece) Pappas, Nikos
- 12 (Greece) Mavrokefalidis, Loukas
- 13 (Greece) Diamantidis, Dimitris
- 14 (United States) Gist, James
- 15 (Uruguay) Batista, Esteban
- 16 (Greece) Koniaris, Antonis
- 17 (Greece) Diamantakos, Georgios
- 18 (Latvia) Blūms, Jānis
- 19 (Greece) Papagiannis, Georgios
- 20 (Greece) Lountzis, Michalis
- 21 (United States) Wright, Julian
- 21 (United States) (Bosnia and Herzegovina) Cooper, D.J.
- 31 (Nigeria) (United States) Lawal, Gani
- 32 (United States) Morgan, Raymar
- Head coach: (Montenegro) Duško Ivanović
- Head coach: (Greece) Sotiris Manolopoulos (interim)

== 2015–16 ==
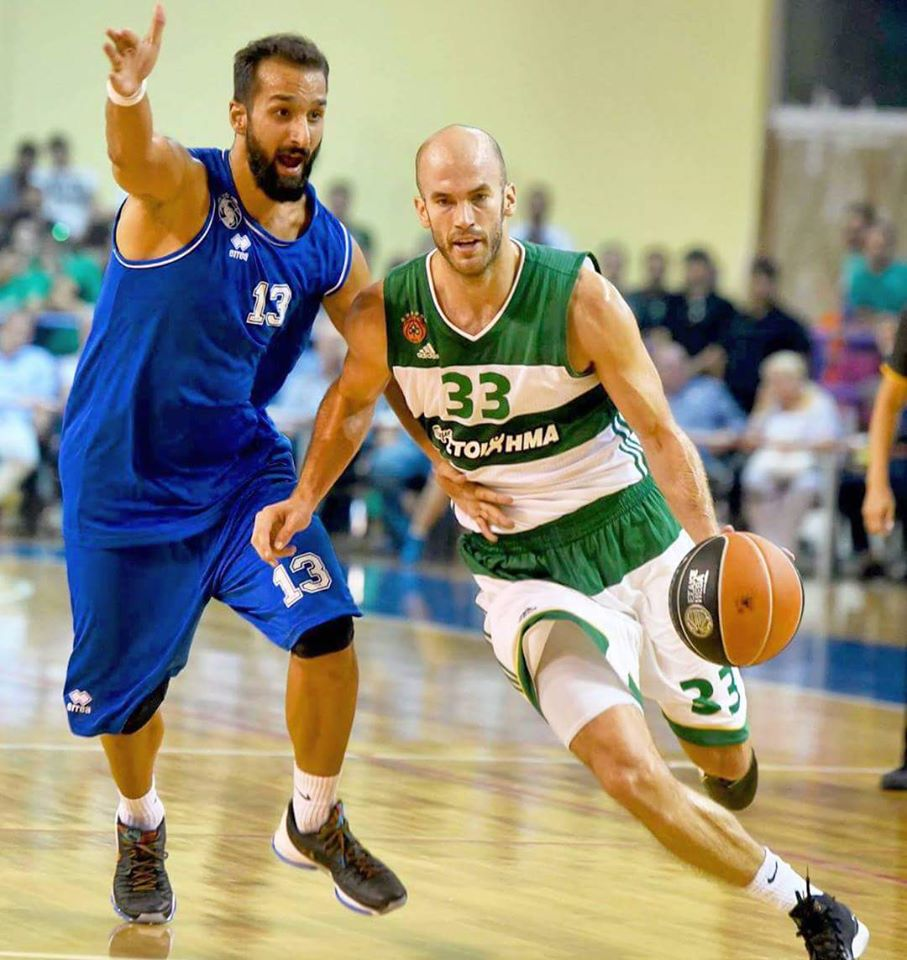
Nick Calathes

=== Titles ===
- (Greece) Greek Cup Winner 2015–16

Roster

- 0 (Georgia (country)) (United States) Haynes, MarQuez
- 3 (Montenegro) (Serbia) Pavlović, Aleksandar
- 5 (Greece) Charalampopoulos, Vassilis
- 6 (Greece) Koniaris, Antonis
- 7 (Greece) Bochoridis, Lefteris
- 8 (Greece) (Serbia) Janković, Vlado
- 9 (Greece) Fotsis, Antonis
- 10 (Serbia) Raduljica, Miroslav
- 11 (Greece) Pappas, Nikos
- 12 (Dominican Republic) (United States) Feldeine, James
- 13 (Greece) Diamantidis, Dimitris
- 14 (United States) Gist, James
- 15 (Greece) (United States) Calathes, Nick
- 16 (Greece) Kalaitzakis, Georgios
- 19 (Greece) Papagiannis, Georgios
- 20 (Greece) Lountzis, Michalis
- 21 (Serbia) (Bosnia and Herzegovina) Kuzmić, Ognjen
- 22 (United States) Williams, Elliot
- 32 (United States) Hunter, Vince
- Head coach: (Serbia) Aleksandar Đorđević
- Head coach: (Greece) Argyris Pedoulakis (end of the season)

== 2016–17 ==
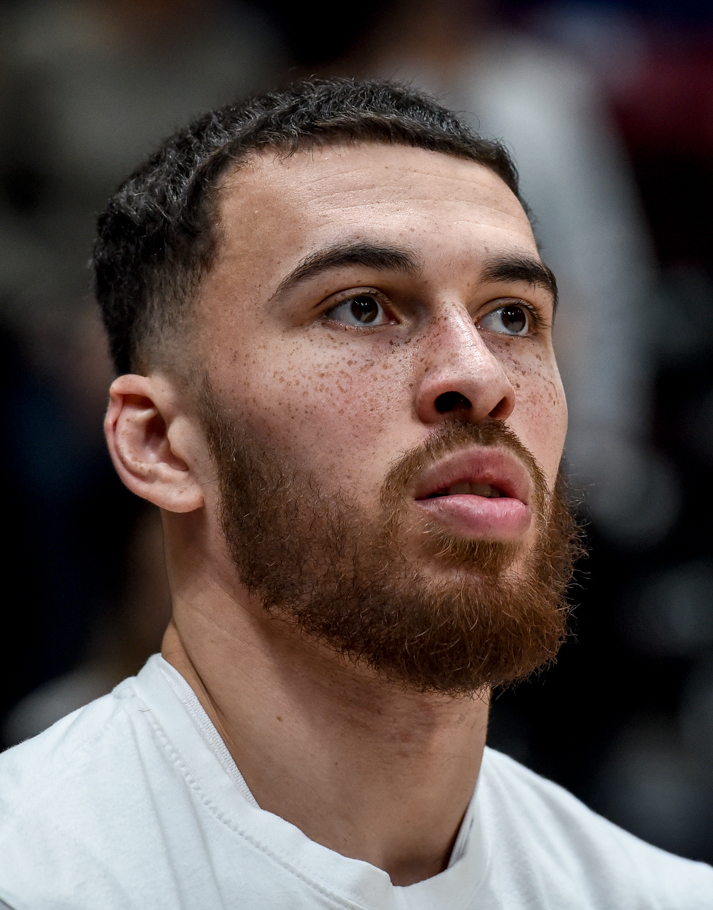
Mike James

=== Titles ===
- (Greece) Greek Champion 2016–17
- (Greece) Greek Cup Winner 2016–17

Roster

- 0 (United States) Singleton, Chris
- 2 (United States) Nichols, Demetris
- 3 (United States) Rivers, K. C.
- 5 (United States) James, Mike
- 7 (Greece) Bochoridis, Lefteris
- 8 (Greece) (United States) Calathes, Pat
- 9 (Greece) Fotsis, Antonis
- 11 (Greece) Pappas, Nikos
- 12 (Dominican Republic) (United States) Feldeine, James
- 14 (United States) Gist, James
- 15 (Greece) Charalampopoulos, Vassilis
- 16 (Greece) Kalaitzakis, Georgios
- 17 (Greece) Gontikas, Costis
- 20 (Greece) Lountzis, Michalis
- 21 (United States) Gabriel, Kenny
- 25 (Italy) Gentile, Alessandro (from December to March)
- 29 (Greece) Bourousis, Ioannis
- 33 (Greece) (United States) Calathes, Nick
- Head coach: (Greece) Argyris Pedoulakis
- Head coach: (Greece) Georgios Vovoras (interim)
- Head coach: (Spain) Xavi Pascual (second part of season)

== 2017–18 ==
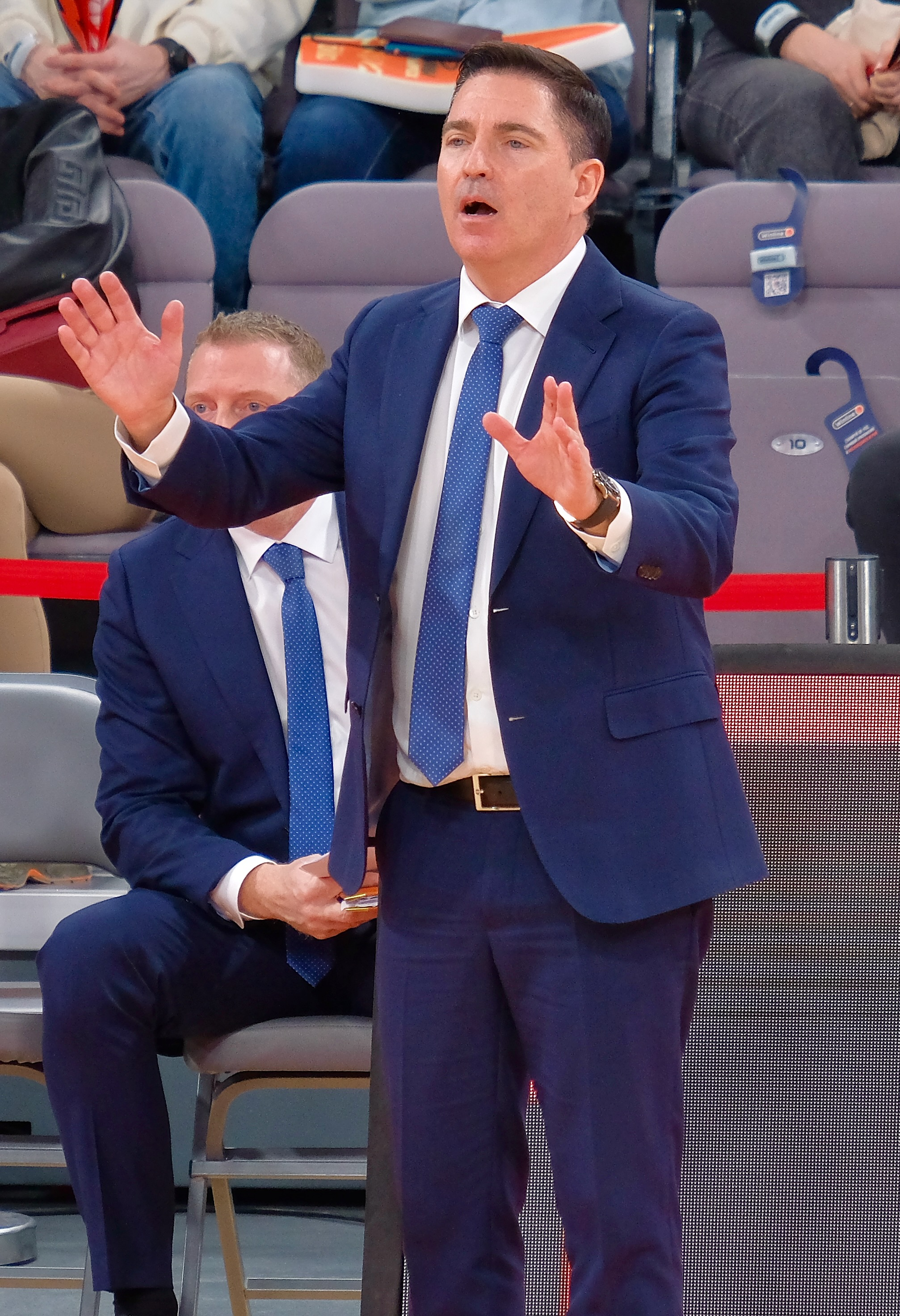
Xavi Pascual

=== Titles ===
- (Greece) Greek Champion 2017–18

Roster

- 0 (United States) Singleton, Chris
- 3 (United States) Rivers, K. C.
- 5 (United States) James, Mike
- 6 (United States) Payne, Adreian
- 11 (Greece) Pappas, Nikos
- 12 (United States) Denmon, Marcus
- 14 (United States) Gist, James
- 15 (Greece) Vougioukas, Ian
- 16 (Greece) Kalaitzakis, Georgios
- 19 (Lithuania) Lekavičius, Lukas
- 22 (United States) Gabriel, Kenny
- 23 (Greece) (United States) Auguste, Zach
- 24 (Belgium) (United States) Lojeski, Matt
- 33 (Greece) (United States) Calathes, Nick
- 43 (Greece) Antetokounmpo, Thanasis
- 44 (Greece) Mitoglou, Dinos
- Head coach: (Spain) Xavi Pascual

== 2018–19 ==
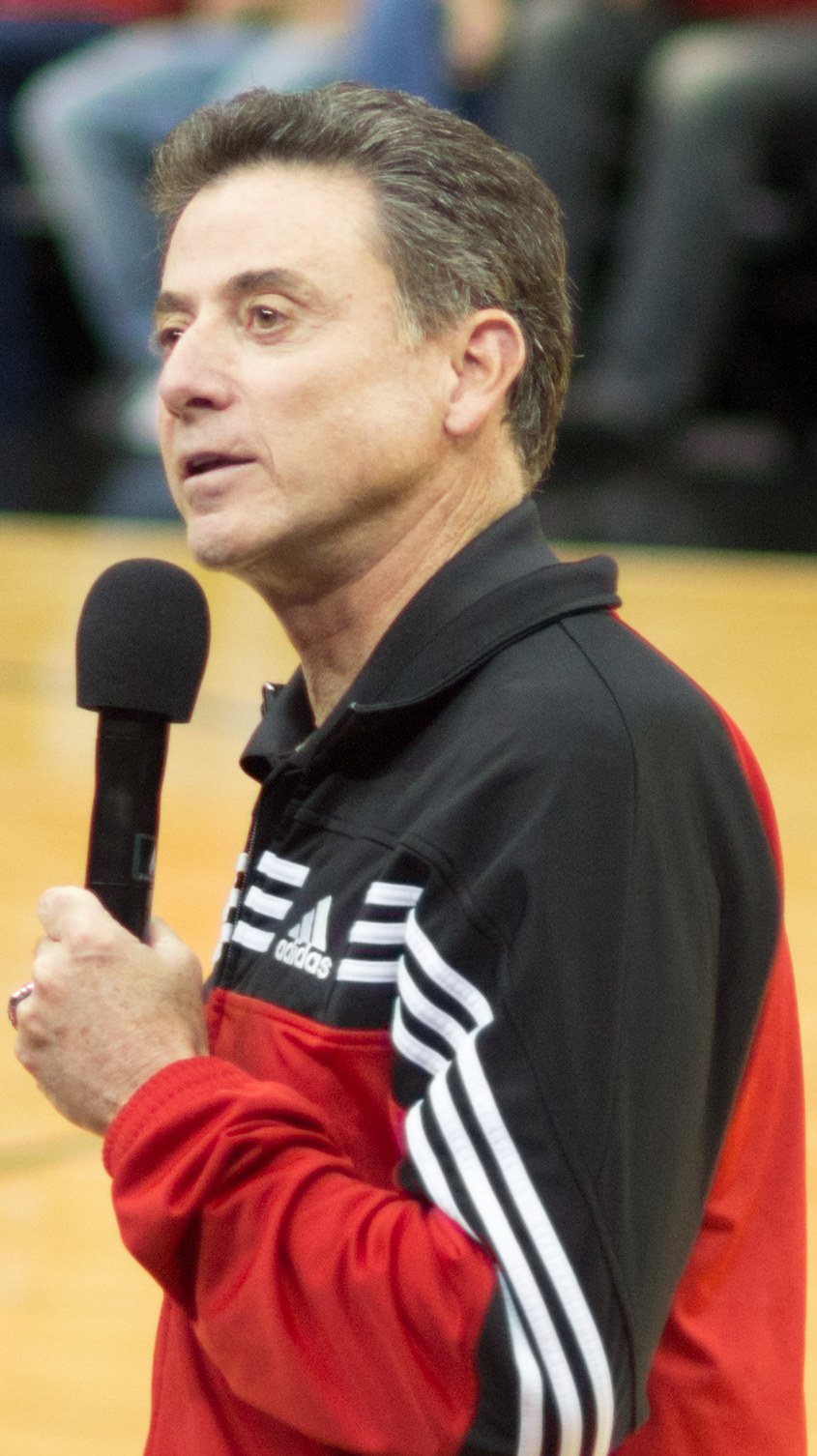
Rick Pitino

=== Titles ===
- (Greece) Greek Champion 2018–19
- (Greece) Greek Cup Winner 2018–19

Roster

- 0 (United States) Thomas, Deshaun
- 3 (United States) Payne, Adreian (from January to March)
- 5 (United States) Langford, Keith
- 6 (Greece) Papagiannis, Georgios
- 7 (Gabon) Lasme, Stéphane (released in January)
- 9 (Greece) Sakellariou, Vangelis
- 10 (Greece) Papapetrou, Ioannis
- 11 (Greece) Pappas, Nikos
- 14 (United States) Gist, James
- 15 (Greece) Vougioukas, Ian
- 16 (Greece) Kalaitzakis, Georgios
- 19 (Lithuania) Lekavičius, Lukas
- 23 (United States) Kilpatrick, Sean (since January)
- 24 (Belgium) (United States) Lojeski, Matt
- 33 (Greece) (United States) Calathes, Nick
- 43 (Greece) Antetokounmpo, Thanasis
- 44 (Greece) Mitoglou, Dinos
- Head coach: (Spain) Xavi Pascual
- Head coach: (Greece) Georgios Vovoras (interim)
- Head coach: (United States) Rick Pitino (second part of the season)

== 2019–20 ==
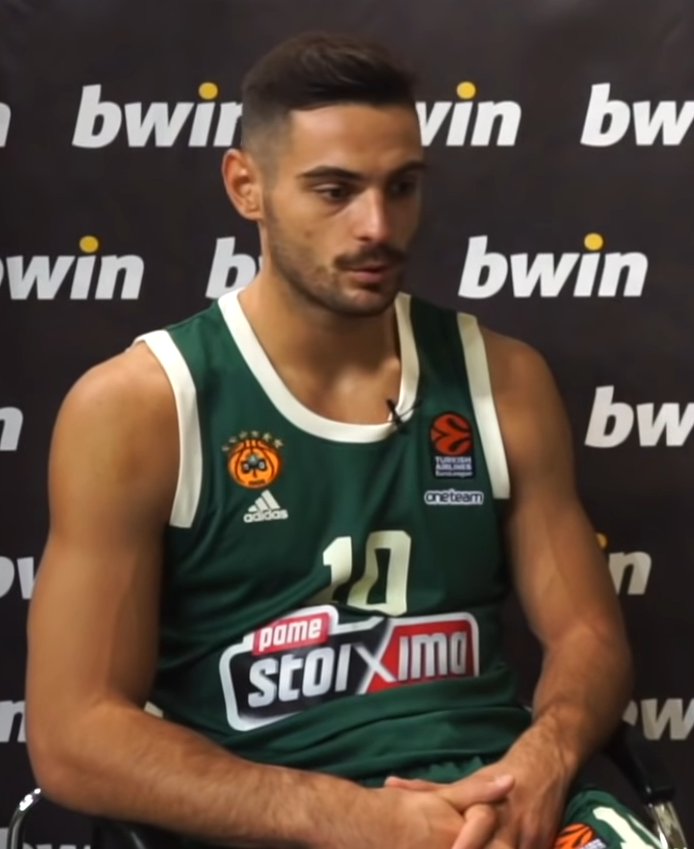
Ioannis Papapetrou

=== Titles ===
- (Greece) Greek Champion 2019–20 *

* Crowned champion through voting between the 14 teams, after the season ended prematurely, in March 2020, due to the COVID-19 pandemic.

Roster

- 0 (United States) Thomas, Deshaun
- 5 (United States) (Montenegro) Rice, Tyrese
- 6 (Greece) Papagiannis, Georgios
- 8 (Canada) Rautins, Andy
- 9 (Greece) Athinaiou, Ioannis
- 10 (Greece) Papapetrou, Ioannis
- 11 (Greece) Pappas, Nikos
- 14 (Greece) Persidis, Nikos
- 15 (Greece) Vougioukas, Ian
- 23 (Greece) Papadakis, Kostas
- 24 (United States) Johnson, Wesley
- 25 (United States) Brown, Rion (released in January)
- 32 (United States) Fredette, Jimmer
- 33 (Greece) (United States) Calathes, Nick
- 35 (United States) Wiley, Jacob
- 44 (Greece) Mitoglou, Dinos
- 50 (Ghana) Bentil, Ben
- Head coach: (Greece) Argyris Pedoulakis
- Head coach: (Greece) Georgios Vovoras (interim)
- Head coach: (United States) Rick Pitino (from November to March)
- Head coach: (Greece) Georgios Vovoras

== 2020–21 ==
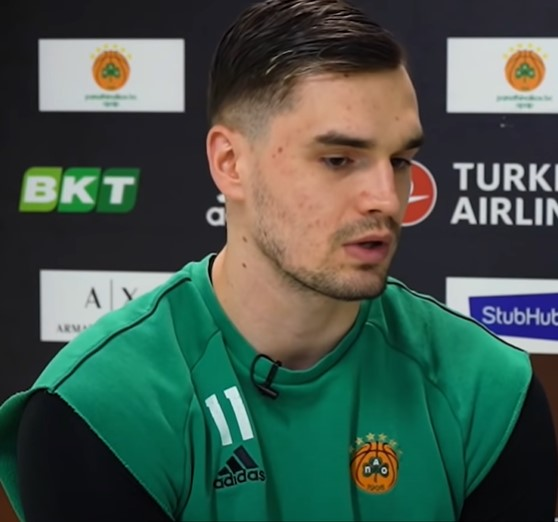
Mario Hezonja

=== Titles ===
- (Greece) Greek Champion 2020–21
- (Greece) Greek Cup Winner 2020–21

Roster

- 0 (United States) Mack, Shelvin
- 5 (United States) Bray, T.J.
- 6 (Greece) Papagiannis, Georgios
- 7 (Greece) Bochoridis, Lefteris
- 8 (Greece) (United States) Auguste, Zach
- 10 (Greece) Papapetrou, Ioannis
- 11 (Croatia) Hezonja, Mario
- 12 (Greece) Diplaros, Nikos
- 14 (Greece) Kaselakis, Leonidas
- 15 (Greece) Vougioukas, Ian
- 16 (Greece) Kalaitzakis, Georgios
- 17 (United States) Foster, Marcus (released in February)
- 18 (Greece) Persidis, Nikos (released in December)
- 26 (Serbia) Nedović, Nemanja
- 28 (United States) Sykes, Keifer (released in October)
- 30 (United States) White, Aaron
- 44 (Greece) Mitoglou, Dinos
- 50 (Ghana) Bentil, Ben
- 55 (United States) Jackson, Pierre (released in October)
- 72 (Greece) Mantzoukas, Lefteris
- 74 (Cuba) Sant-Roos, Howard
- Head coach: (Greece) Georgios Vovoras
- Head coach: (Greece) Kostas Charalampidis (interim)
- Head coach: (Israel) Oded Kattash (second part of the season)

== 2021–22 ==
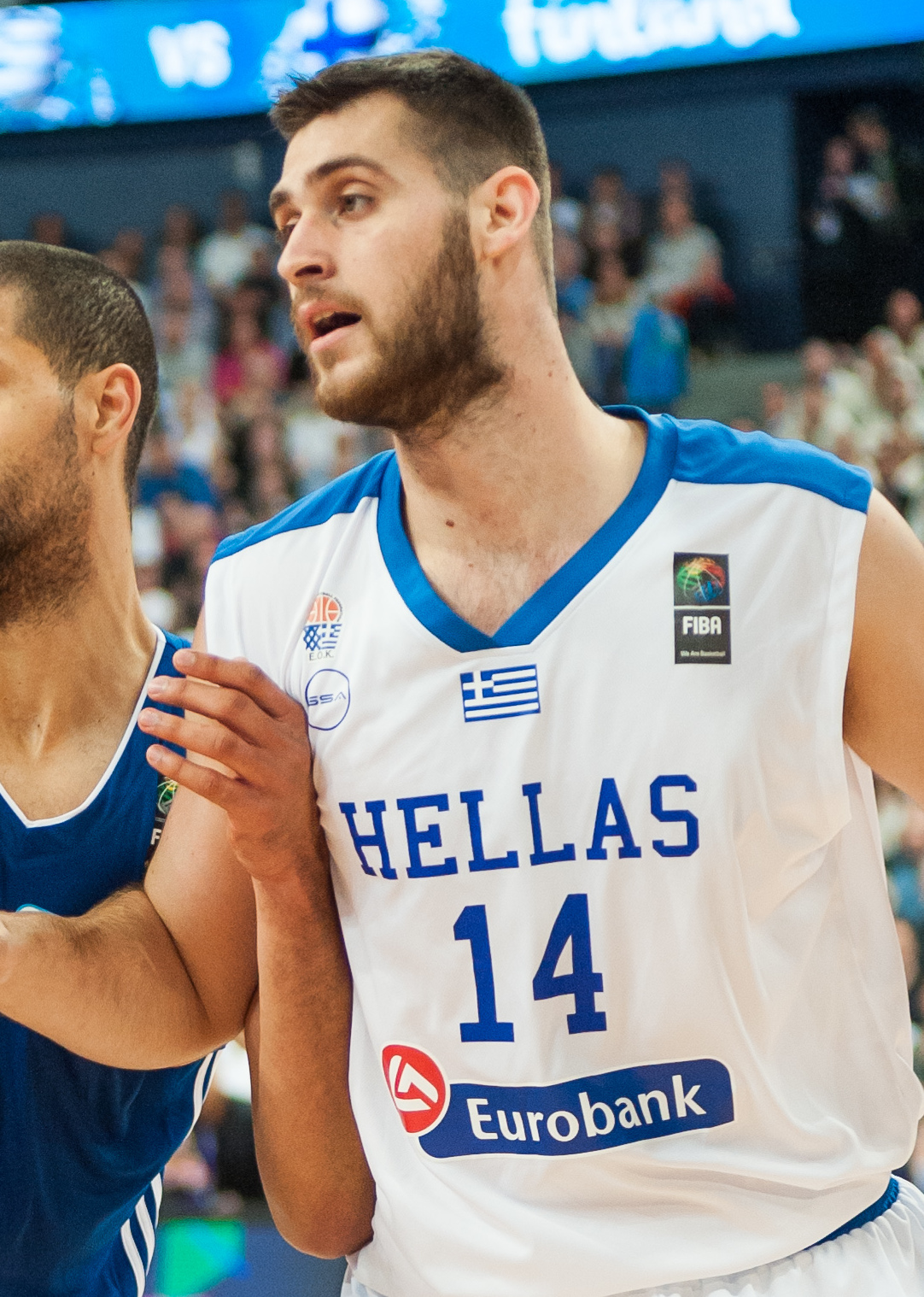
Georgios Papagiannis

=== Titles ===
- (Greece) Greek Super Cup Winner 2021

Roster

- 3 (United States) Perry, Kendrick (released in January)
- 3 (United States) Siva, Peyton (joined in April)
- 5 (United States) Macon, Daryl
- 6 (Greece) Papagiannis, Georgios
- 7 (Greece) Bochoridis, Lefteris
- 9 (Greece) Kavvadas, Vassilis
- 10 (Greece) Papapetrou, Ioannis
- 11 (United States) Ferrell, Yogi (from October to December)
- 14 (Greece) Kaselakis, Leonidas
- 15 (United States) White, Okaro
- 20 (United States) Floyd, Jehyve (released in December)
- 21 (Greece) Avdalas, Neoklis
- 24 (Serbia) Jović, Stefan (joined in January)
- 26 (Serbia) Nedović, Nemanja
- 33 (Greece) Chougkaz, Nikos (on loan to Ionikos until February)
- 40 (United States) Evans, Jeremy
- 72 (Greece) Mantzoukas, Lefteris
- 74 (Cuba) Sant-Roos, Howard
- Head coach: (Greece) Dimitris Priftis
- Head coach: (Greece) Georgios Vovoras (end of the season)

== 2022–23 ==
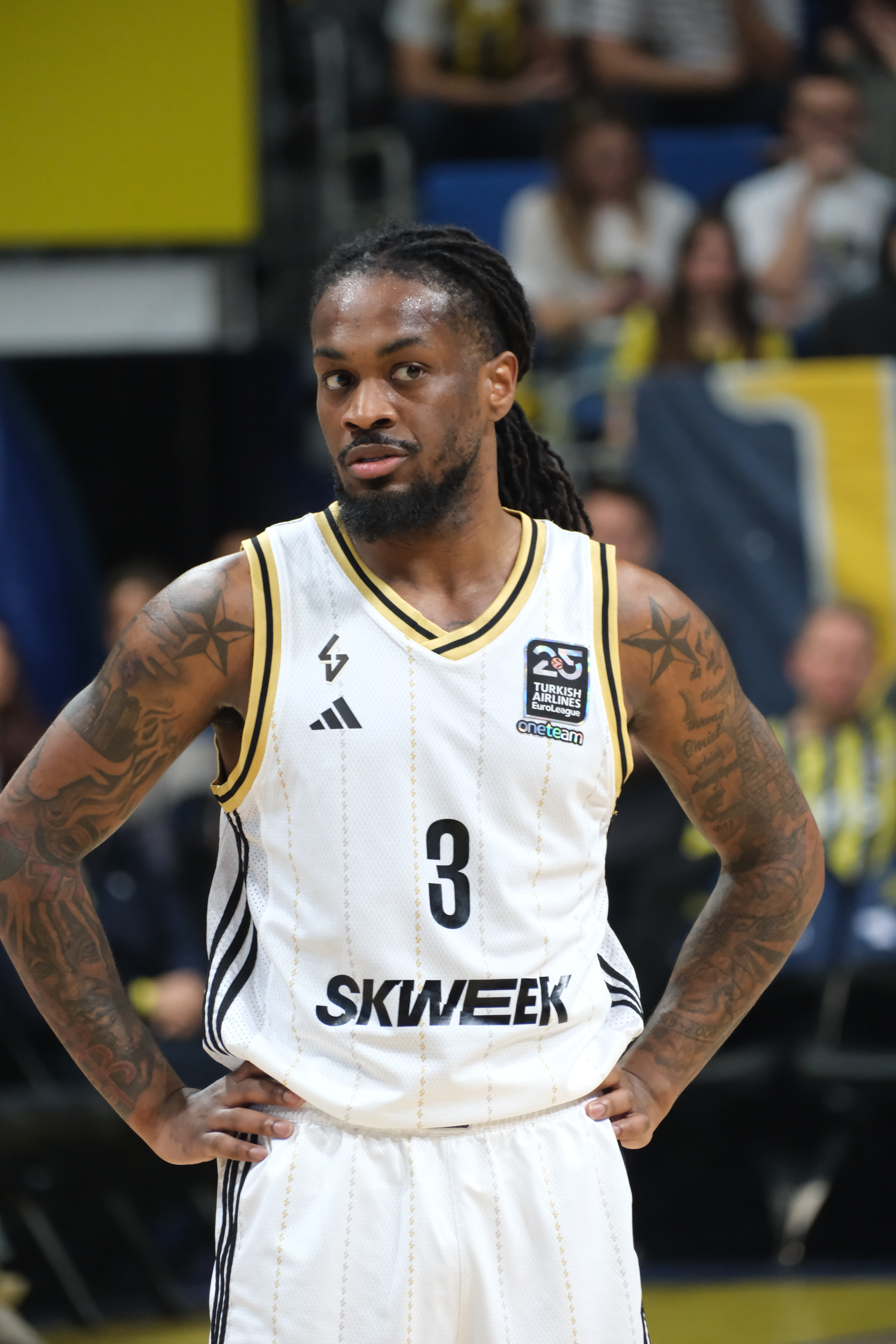
Paris Lee

Roster

- 0 (Greece) Kalaitzakis, Panagiotis
- 3 (United States) Wolters, Nate
- 5 (United States) Lee, Paris
- 6 (Greece) Papagiannis, Georgios
- 7 (Greece) Bochoridis, Lefteris
- 8 (United States) Williams, Derrick
- 9 (Greece) Agravanis, Dimitrios (joined in January)
- 11 (Greece) Pappas, Nikos
- 12 (United States) Andrews, Andrew (sidelined in November, released in March)
- 16 (Greece) Kalaitzakis, Georgios
- 17 (United States) Thomas, Matt (joined in January)
- 20 (Greece) Samodurov, Alexandros
- 21 (Greece) Avdalas, Neoklis
- 24 (United States) Bacon, Dwayne (from October to April)
- 37 (Poland) Ponitka, Mateusz
- 33 (Greece) Chougkaz, Nikos (on loan to Peristeri in February)
- 40 (Lithuania) Grigonis, Marius
- 72 (Greece) Mantzoukas, Lefteris
- 77 (Lithuania) Gudaitis, Artūras
- Head coach: (Montenegro) Dejan Radonjić
- Head coach: (Greece) Christos Serelis (second part of the season)

== 2023–24 ==
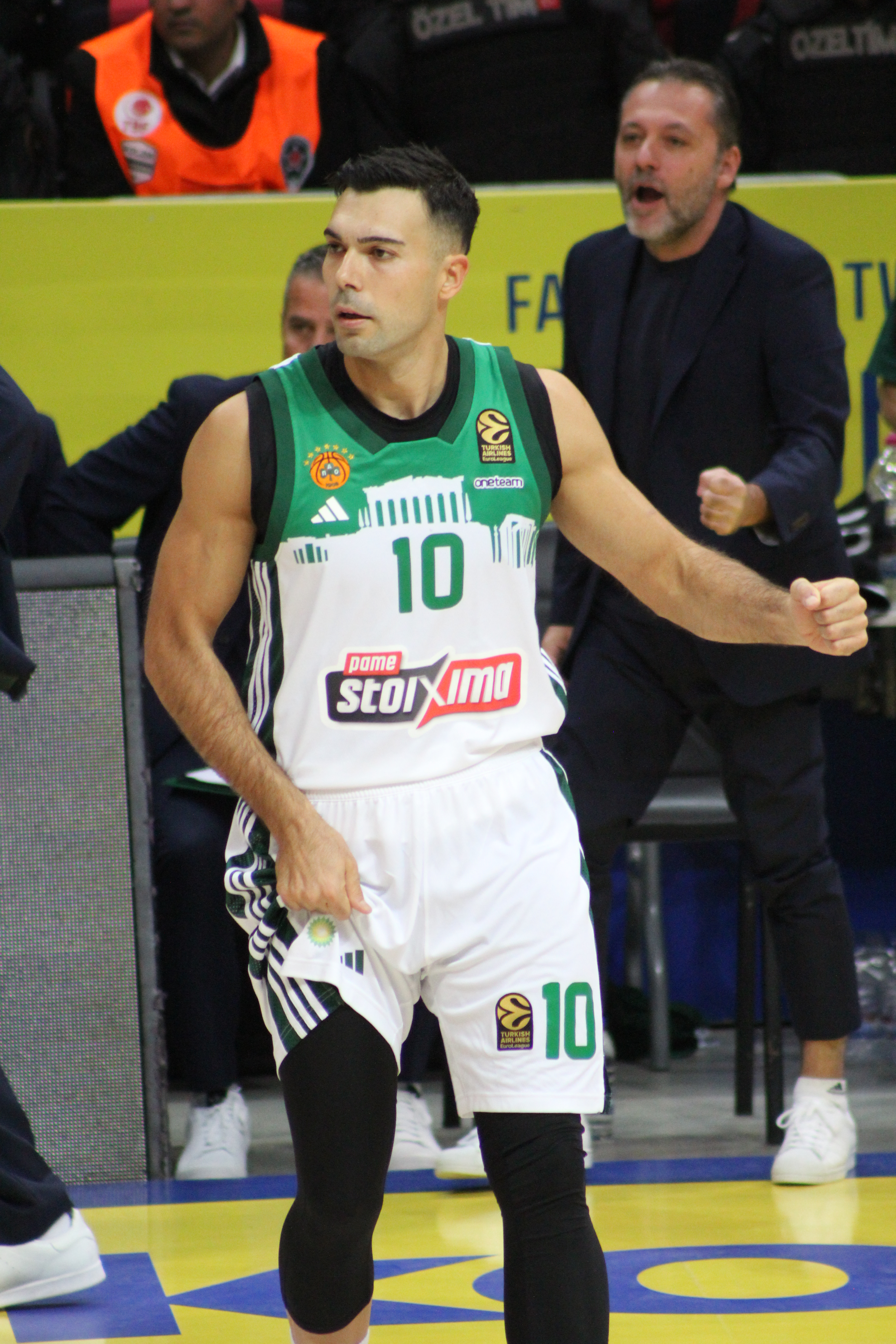
Kostas Sloukas

=== Titles ===
- (European Union) EuroLeague Champion 2023–24
- (Greece) Greek Champion 2023–24

Roster

- 0 (Greece) Kalaitzakis, Panagiotis
- 2 (Argentina) Vildoza, Luca
- 3 (United States) Guy, Kyle (released in January)
- 6 (Greece) Moraitis, Dimitrios
- 8 (Poland) Balcerowski, Aleksander
- 10 (Greece) Sloukas, Kostas
- 20 (Greece) Samodurov, Alexandros
- 21 (Greece) Papapetrou, Ioannis
- 22 (United States) Grant, Jerian
- 25 (United States) Nunn, Kendrick (joined in November)
- 26 (France) Lessort, Mathias
- 37 (Greece) Antetokounmpo, Kostas
- 40 (Lithuania) Grigonis, Marius
- 41 (Spain) Hernangómez, Juancho
- 44 (Greece) Mitoglou, Dinos
- 72 (Greece) Mantzoukas, Lefteris
- Head coach: (Turkey) Ergin Ataman

== 2024–25 ==
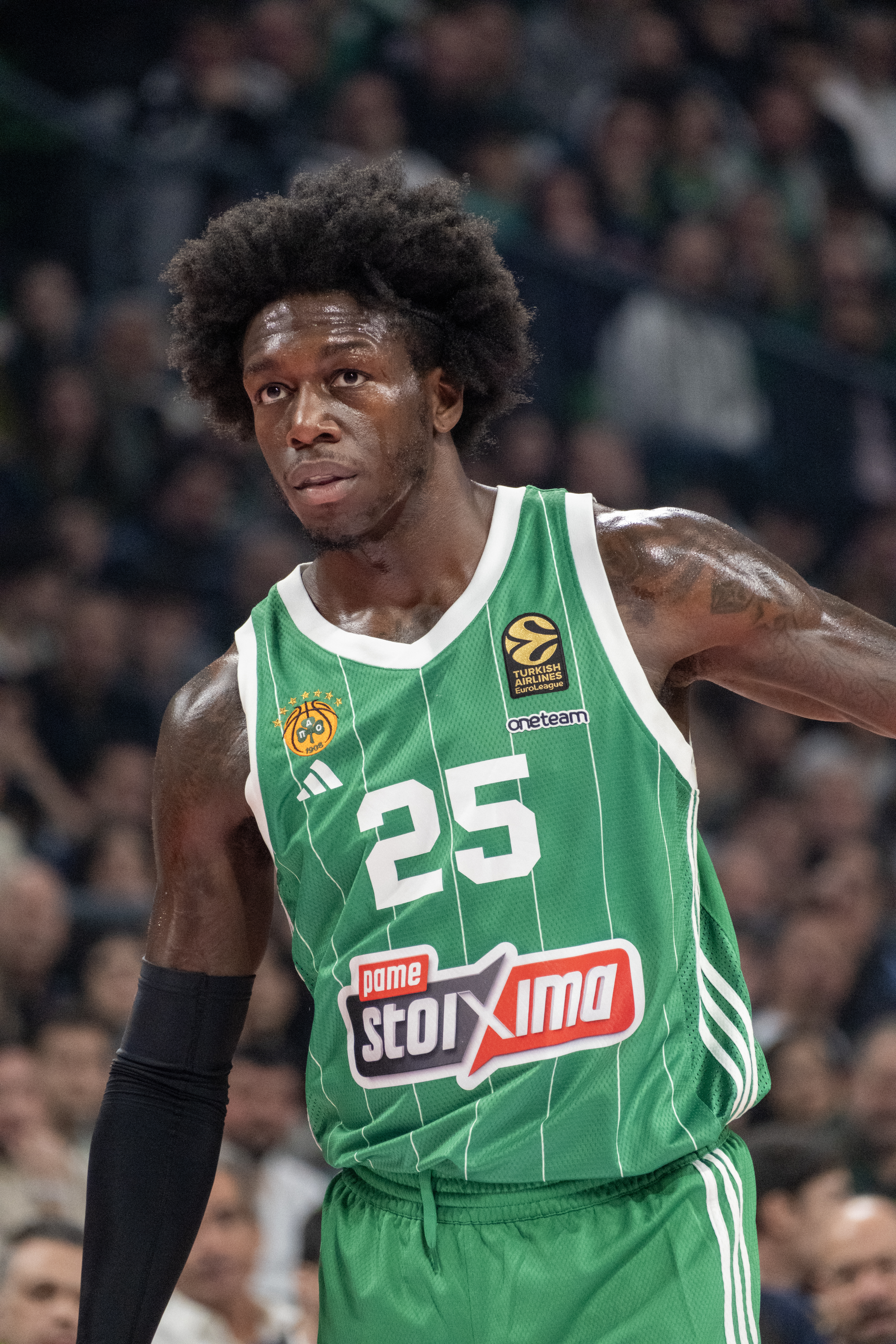
Kendrick Nunn

=== Titles ===
- (Greece) Greek Cup Winner 2024–25

Roster

- 0 (Greece) Kalaitzakis, Panagiotis
- 2 (United States) (Spain) Brown, Lorenzo
- 6 (Greece) Moraitis, Dimitrios
- 10 (Greece) Sloukas, Kostas
- 16 (Turkey) Osman, Cedi
- 20 (Greece) Samodurov, Alexandros
- 21 (Greece) Papapetrou, Ioannis
- 22 (United States) Grant, Jerian
- 24 (Germany) Pleiß, Tibor (joined in February)
- 25 (United States) Nunn, Kendrick
- 26 (France) Lessort, Mathias
- 32 (South Sudan) (United States) Gabriel, Wenyen (joined in December)
- 37 (Greece) Antetokounmpo, Kostas (released in February)
- 40 (Lithuania) Grigonis, Marius
- 41 (Spain) Hernangómez, Juancho
- 44 (Greece) Mitoglou, Dinos
- 77 (Turkey) Yurtseven, Ömer
- Head coach: (Turkey) Ergin Ataman

== 2025–26 ==
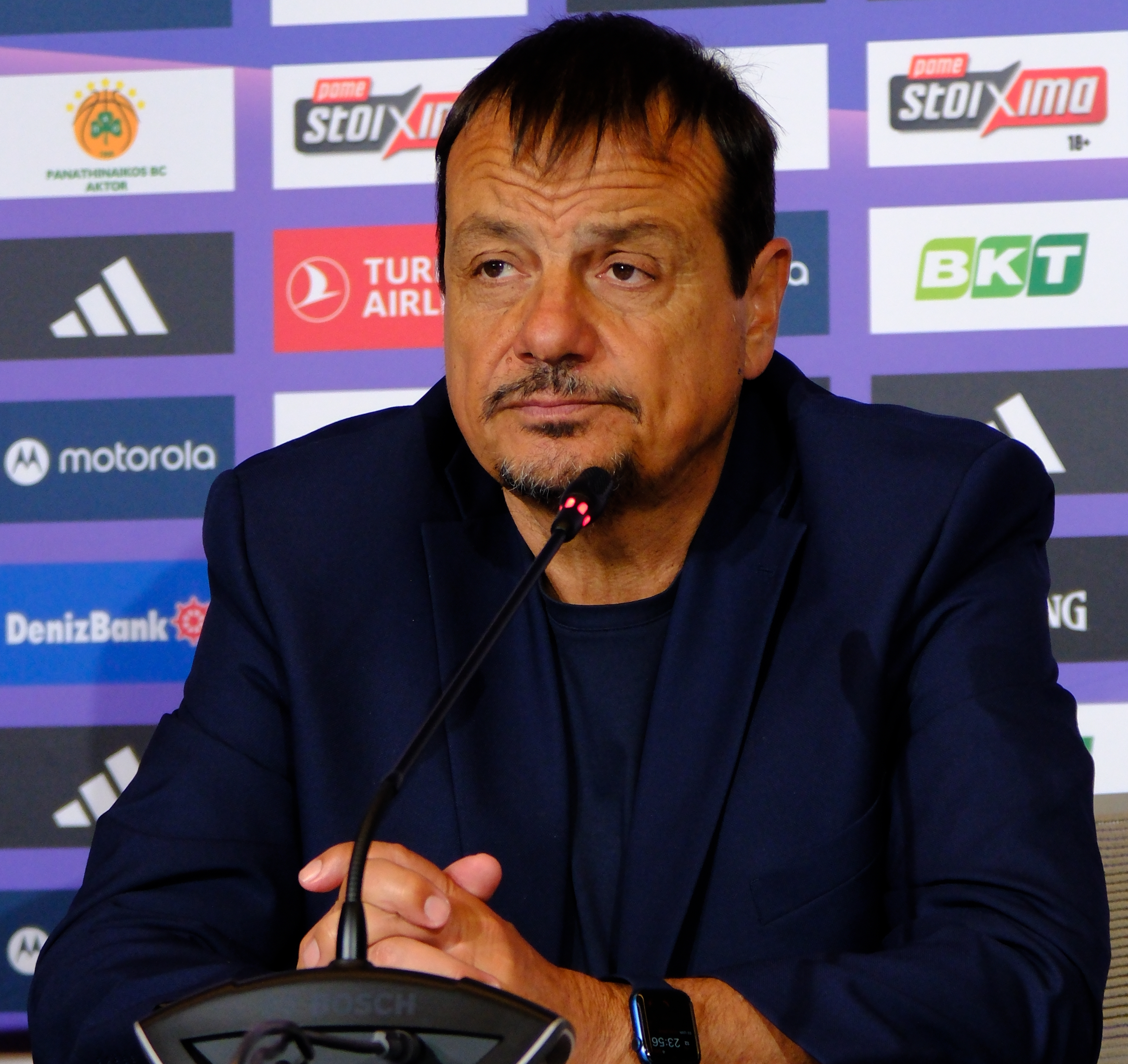
Ergin Ataman

=== Titles ===
- (Greece) Greek Cup Winner 2025–26

Roster

- 0 (United States) (North Macedonia) Shorts, T.J.
- 5 (Greece) Kalaitzakis, Panagiotis
- 6 (Turkey) Osman, Cedi
- 8 (United States) Holmes, Richaun (released in March)
- 10 (Greece) Sloukas, Kostas
- 11 (United States) Hayes-Davis, Nigel (joined in February)
- 17 (Greece) Rogkavopoulos, Nikos
- 20 (Greece) Samodurov, Alexandros
- 22 (United States) Grant, Jerian
- 24 (Greece) Kouzeloglou, Ioannis (on loan to Maroussi from January to March)
- 25 (United States) Nunn, Kendrick
- 26 (France) Lessort, Mathias
- 27 (Greece) Toliopoulos, Vassilis
- 35 (United States) Faried, Kenneth (joined in November)
- 40 (Lithuania) Grigonis, Marius
- 41 (Spain) Hernangómez, Juancho
- 44 (Greece) Mitoglou, Dinos
- 77 (Turkey) Yurtseven, Ömer (released in February)
- Head coach: (Turkey) Ergin Ataman

== Sources ==
- Panathinaikos official site - Rosters 2001-2008 (gr)
- All Panathinaikos Greek Championship winner teams (gr)
- All Greek cup finalists rosters (gr)
- Euroleague 1996-97
- Panathinaikos history & past rosters
