= David Stergakos =

Greek basketball player (born 1956)

Personal information
- Born: 24 October 1956 (age 70) (Note: Some sources list him as being born on 24 October 1956, while others state he was born on 24 January 1956.) United States (Note: Stergakos' birth place is unclear. Some sources state he was born in Montclair, New Jersey, while others state he was born in Kansas City, Missouri.)
- Listed height: 6 ft 9 in (2.06 m)
- Listed weight: 240 lb (109 kg)

Career information
- College: Bloomfield (1974–1978)
- NBA draft: 1978: 4th round, 72nd overall pick
- Drafted by: Boston Celtics
- Playing career: 1978–1991
- Position: Power forward / center

Career history
- 1978–1991: Panathinaikos

Career highlights
- 4× Greek League champion (1980–1982, 1984); 4× Greek Cup winner (1979, 1982, 1983, 1986); Greek League rebounding leader (1988); Greek Cup Finals Top Scorer (1986)
- Stats at Basketball Reference
Medals
Men's basketball
Representing Greece
EuroBasket
Silver medal – second place	1989 Yugoslavia

David Nelson Stergakos (Greek: Ντέιβιντ Στεργάκος; born 24 October 1956) is a Greek-American former professional basketball player. At a height of 6 ft 9 in (2.06 m), he played at both the power forward and center positions.

== Early life and name ==
Stergakos was born in the United States. Hailing from Montclair, New Jersey, he was known as Nelson in the U.S. and Stergakos in Greece.

== College career ==
Stergakos played four years of college basketball with Bloomfield College in New Jersey between 1974 and 1978. He averaged 20 points and 14 rebounds per game in 104 career games.

== Professional career ==
Stergakos was selected by the Boston Celtics in the fourth round of the 1978 NBA draft with the 72nd overall draft pick.

Between 1978 and 1991, Stergakos played for Panathinaikos in Greece. He won four Greek League championships (1980, 1981, 1982, 1984) and four Greek Cups (1979, 1982, 1983, 1986). He was the Greek Cup Finals Top Scorer in 1986 and he was the top rebounder in the Greek League in the 1987–88 season with an average of 12.2 rebounds per game. His final season came in 1990–91.

== National team career ==
Stergakos played for the Greek national team and won a silver medal at the 1989 FIBA EuroBasket. The following year, he helped Greece finish sixth at the 1990 FIBA World Championship. He scored 585 points in 65 games with the national team.

== Post-playing career ==
As of January 2007, Stergakos had been team manager of Maroussi for four years.
