= Ioannis Lambrou =

Greek athlete

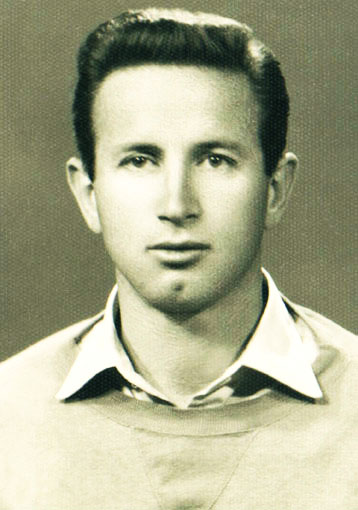

Personal information
- Nationality: Greek
- Born: 23 March 1921 Karystos, Greece
- Died: 1998 (aged 76–77)

Sport
- Sport: Athletics
- Event: High jump

Ioannis "Giannis" Lambrou (Greek: Ιωάννης "Γιάννης" Λάμπρου; 23 March 1921 – 1998) was a Greek athlete. He competed in the men's high jump at the 1948 Summer Olympics. He also competed in the basketball competition at the 1952 Summer Olympics.
