= Charis Papazoglou =

Greek basketball player and coach

Personal information
- Born: October 5, 1953 (age 73) Greece
- Listed height: 6 ft 2 in (188 cm)

Career history
- 1971–1980: Panathinaikos
- 1982–1985: AEK Athens

Career highlights
- As player: 7× Greek League champion (1971–1975, 1977, 1980); Greek Cup winner (1979)

Charalampos Papazoglou, commonly known as either Maralabos Papazoglou or Charis Papazoglou (alternate spellings: Haris, Harris) (Greek: Χάρης Παπάζογλου; born October 5, 1953) is a Greek former professional basketball player and coach.

== Club career ==
During his club career, Papazoglou played with the Greek teams Panathinaikos and AEK Athens. With Panathinaikos, he won seven Greek League championships (1971, 1972, 1973, 1974, 1975, 1977, 1980), and a Greek Cup title (1979). He also made it to the semifinals of the FIBA European Champions Cup (EuroLeague), during the 1971–72 season.

== National team career ==
Papazoglou was a member of the junior national teams of Greece. With Greece's junior national team, he played at the 1972 FIBA Europe Under-18 Championship. He was also a member of the senior Greek national basketball team. With Greece, he played at the 1975 Mediterranean Games.

== Coaching career ==
After he retired from playing basketball, Papazoglou worked as a basketball coach.
