= Dimitris Dimakopoulos =

Greek basketball player (born 1966)

Personal information
- Born: January 28, 1966 (age 60) Thessaloniki, Greece
- Listed height: 6 ft 9.5 in (2.07 m)
- Listed weight: 230 lb (104 kg)

Career information
- NBA draft: 1988: undrafted
- Position: Power forward / Center
- Number: 6

Career history
- –1986: Esperos Kallitheas
- 1986–1991: Panathinaikos Athens
- 1991–1992: PAOK Thessaloniki
- 1992–1994: Apollon Patras

Career highlights
- Greek League champion (1992)

Dimitris Dimakopoulos (alternate spelling: Dimitrios, Greek: Δημήτρης Δημακόπουλος; born January 28, 1966, in Thessaloniki, Greece) is a Greek former professional basketball player and coach.

== Youth career and early years ==
Dimakopoulos began playing the sport of basketball in the youth system of the Greek club Esperos Kallitheas. He was considered to be one of the most talented youth players of his generation in Europe.

== Professional career ==
Dimakopoulos started his senior men's club career with the Greek club Esperos Kallitheas. In 1986, Dimakopoulos moved from Esperos, to the Greek club Panathinaikos Athens. With the Greek club PAOK Thessaloniki, Dimakopoulos won the Greek League championship in the 1991–92 season, and he was also a FIBA European Cup finalist in the same 1991–92 season. After that, he moved to the Greek club Apollon Patras.

== National team career ==
Dimakopoulos was a member of the junior national teams of Greece. He played with Greece's junior national teams at the 1981 FIBA European Cadet Championship, the 1983 FIBA European Cadet Championship, and the 1984 FIBA European Junior Championship.

Dimakopoulos was also a member of the senior men's Greek national team. He was a member of the Greek national team that finished in 10th place at the 1986 FIBA World Championship.

== Coaching career ==
After he retired from playing professional club basketball, Dimakopoulos began working as a basketball coach.

== Personal life ==
Dimakopoulos' son, Ioannis Dimakopoulos, is also a professional basketball player, and he played with both the junior national teams of Greece, and also in NCAA Division I college basketball with the UC Irvine's Anteaters.
