= Stelios Arvanitis =

Greek basketball player (born 1927)

Personal information
- Nationality: Greek
- Born: 1927 Palaion Faliro, Greece

Sport
- Sport: Basketball

Stelios Arvanitis (born 1927) was a Greek basketball player. He competed in the men's tournament at the 1952 Summer Olympics.
