= 1986 Greek Basketball Super Cup =

1986 Greek Super Cup
- Season: 1986
- Games played: 2
- Teams: 2

Finals
- Champions: Aris (1st title)
- Runners-up: Panathinaikos

Statistical leaders
Points	(Greece) Nikos Galis	42.5 (PPG)

The 1986 Greek Basketball Super Cup was the 1st edition of the professional basketball national domestic super cup competition of Greece, the Greek Basketball Super Cup. The first Greek Basketball Super Cup was held prior to the start of the 1986–87 season, and it was organised under the auspices of the Hellenic Basketball Federation (E.O.K.). It was contested between the 1985–86 Greek Basket League season champions, Aris Thessaloniki, and the 1985–86 Greek Basketball Cup winners, Panathinaikos.

In subsequent seasons, Aris went on to win both the Greek League championship and the Greek Cup (the domestic double title), for the next four consecutive seasons (1986–87, 1987–88, 1988–89, and 1989–90). So there was no reason to hold the Greek Super Cup over those next four seasons. Because of that, the Hellenic Basketball Federation (E.O.K.), decided that the Super Cup wasn't a needed competition, and never held it again. However, the Greek Super Cup was revived much later, with the 2020 edition of the competition, under the auspices of the Hellenic Basketball Clubs Association (HEBA), using a different four-team format.

== Competition format ==
The competition was played between the 1985–86 Greek Basket League champions, Aris, and the 1985–86 Greek Basketball Cup winners, Panathinaikos Athens. It was contested as a two-legged, home-and-away, aggregate score competition. With the first game taking place in Thessaloniki, where Aris is based, and the second game taking place in Athens, where Panathinaikos is based. Aris won the first game in Thessaloniki, by a score of 117–85, and the second game in Athens, by a score of 104–88, thereby easily winning the Super Cup, by an overall aggregate score of (221–173).

Year (Season)	Winners	Score	Runners-up	Venue	Location
(Greece) Greek Basketball Super Cup
1986 (1986–87)	Aris	117–85 (117–85)	Panathinaikos	Alexandreio Melathron	Thessaloniki
1986 (1986–87)	Aris	104–88 (221–173)	Panathinaikos	Peace and Friendship Stadium	Athens

== Score sheets ==
1986 Greek Super Cup Finals
27 August 1986 – Alexandreio Melathron

First Leg: Aris 117 – Panathinaikos 85 (117–85)

Aris (Head Coach: Giannis Ioannidis): Nikos Galis 44, Michalis Romanidis 16, Georgios Doxakis 8, Vassilis Lipiridis 4, Lefteris Subotić 28, Petros Stamatis 6, Panagiotis Giannakis 9, Bairaktaris 2, Tasos Tsitakis, Vangelis Athanasiadis, Dimitris Kokolakis (DNP), Nikos Filippou (DNP).
Panathinaikos (Head Coach: Kostas Mourouzis): Dimitris Dimakopoulos 8, Liveris Andritsos 21, Argyris Papapetrou 15, Kostas Missas 14, Memos Ioannou 9, Dionysis Fragiskatos 6, Argyris Pedoulakis 7, Georgios Skropolithas 5, David Stergakos (DNP).
4 September 1986 – SEF

Second Leg: Panathinaikos 88 – Aris 104 (173–221)

Panathinaikos (Head Coach: Kostas Mourouzis): Dimitris Dimakopoulos, Liveris Andritsos, Argyris Papapetrou, Kostas Missas, Memos Ioannou, Dionysis Fragiskatos, Argyris Pedoulakis, Georgios Skropolithas, David Stergakos.
Aris (Head Coach: Giannis Ioannidis): Nikos Galis 41, Michalis Romanidis 12, Georgios Doxakis 7, Vassilis Lipiridis 6, Lefteris Subotić 13, Petros Stamatis 10, Panagiotis Giannakis 15, Bairaktaris, Tasos Tsitakis, Vangelis Athanasiadis, Dimitris Kokolakis, Nikos Filippou.

== Finals top scorer ==
- (Greece) Nikos Galis – 42.5 PPG (2 games)

== See also ==
- Greek Basket League
- Greek Basketball Cup
- HEBA Greek All-Star Game
- Hellenic Basketball Federation (E.O.K.)
- Hellenic Basketball Association (HEBA)
