= Basketball at the 1975 Mediterranean Games =

The basketball tournament at the 1975 Mediterranean Games was held in Algiers, Algeria.

== Medalists ==
| Event | Gold | Silver | Bronze |
|---|---|---|---|
| Men | Yugoslavia | France | Italy |

== Final standings ==
| Rank | Team |
|---|---|
| 1st place, gold medalist(s) | Yugoslavia Goran Rakočević, Dragan Kićanović, Dragan Todorić, Rajko Žižić, Željko Jerkov, Radivoje Živković, Blagoja Georgievski, Andro Knego, Ratko Radovanović, Žarko Varajić, Dražen Dalipagić, Mirza Delibašić. Coach: Mirko Novosel |
| 2nd place, silver medalist(s) | France Marc Bellot, Éric Beugnot, Jacques Cachemire, Jean-Claude Bonato, Serge Clabau, Hervé Dubuisson, Sylvain Grzanka, Philippe Haquet, Jacky Lamothe, Jean-Michel Sénégal, Saint-Ange Vebobe. Coach: Pierre Dao |
| 3rd place, bronze medalist(s) | Italy Massimo Antonelli, Loris Benelli, Mario Beretta, Carlo Caglieris, Giuseppe Gergati, Stefano Gorghetto, Roberto Paleari, Elvio Pierich, Sergio Rizzi, Renzo Tombolato, Renato Villalta, Paolo Viola. Coach: Carlo Cerioni |
| 4 | Spain José Manuel Beirán, José Luis Beltrán, Manuel Bosch, Ernesto Delgado, Gregorio Estrada, Juan Ramón Fernández Robert, Joan Filbá, Vicente Gil Sáez, Toncho Nava, Luis María Prada, Vicente Ramos Cecilio, Andrés Soriano. Coach: Antonio Díaz-Miguel |
| 5 | Greece Vaggelis Alexandris, Pavlos Diakoulas, Dimitris Fosses, Michalis Giannouzakos, Steve Giatzoglou, Giorgos Kastrinakis, Dimitris Kokolakis, Takis Koronaios, Charis Papageorgiou, Charis Papazoglou, Kostas Petropoulos, Pavlos Stamelos. Coach: Richard Dukeshire |
| 6 | Egypt |
| 7 | Tunisia |
| 8 | Algeria Mehenni, Ghezal, Bisker, Kaddour, Zoghbi, Tayeb Ben Abbès, Zenati Tayeb, Barka, Khaies, Aktouf, Slami, Terrai Rabah. Coach: Gheorghe Rosu |
