= Chris Kefalos =

Greek basketball player

Personal information
- Born: August 12, 1945 Philadelphia, US
- Died: July 4, 2022 (aged 76) Greece
- Listed height: 6 ft 4 in (1.93 m)
- Listed weight: 200 lb (91 kg)

Career information
- High school: John Bartram High School
- College: Temple University (1963–1967)
- NBA draft: 1967: undrafted
- Playing career: 1968–1978
- Position: Point guard / Shooting guard
- Number: 5, 10
- Coaching career: 1978–1987

Career history

Playing
- 1968–1969: Wilmington Blue Bombers
- 1969–1978: Panathinaikos Athens

Coaching
- 1978–1982: Panathinaikos (assistant)
- 1982–1983: Panathinaikos
- 1985–1987: Ilysiakos Athens

Career highlights
- As player: 6× Greek League champion (1971–1975, 1977); As head coach: Greek Cup winner (1983); Greek 2nd Division champion (1986)

Chris Kefalos, also commonly known as Christos Kefalos (Greek: Χρήστος "Κρις" Κέφαλος; August 12, 1945 – July 4, 2022), was a Greek-American professional basketball player and coach. During his club playing career, Kefalos was considered to have revolutionized the way the point guard position was played in Greek basketball.

== High school and early years ==
Kefalos attended John Bartram High School, in Philadelphia, Pennsylvania, in the US. During high school, he played both basketball and baseball competitively. In baseball, he was a pitcher. Kefalos pitched in the 1963 Philadelphia city baseball finals, and led his team to the city championship.

In basketball, he played at the power forward position, and he was a teammate of the famous basketball player Earl Monroe, who would later go on to play in the NBA. Kefalos won Philadelphia's high school city basketball championship in 1961. He was a Philadelphia city basketball All-First Team selection in 1963.

== College career ==
After graduating from High School, Kefalos attended Temple University. While at Temple, he played college basketball in the NCAA Division I, with the Temple Owls, under the school's head coach, Harry Litwack. In college, he played as a swingman and a point guard. While playing in college, Kefalos suffered a severe back injury in a game against Penn State, and because of that, he was required to use an orthopedic back support brace for the remainder of his playing career. Kefalos averaged 11.0 points and 4.7 rebounds per game during his college career, with averages of 13.0 points and 4.3 rebounds per game in his senior season.

== Professional career ==
After graduating from college, Kefalos was offered a contract by the Seattle SuperSonics of the National Basketball Association (NBA). However, he turned the contract offer down for personal reasons at that time. He eventually began his club career with the Wilmington Blue Bombers of the Eastern Professional Basketball League (EPBL), which would later be known as the Continental Basketball Association (CBA), in the 1968–69 season, in which he averaged 6.4 points, 3.8 rebounds, and 4.0 assists per game, in 25 games played.

While he was playing in a basketball tournament in Boston, team officials from the Greek Basket League club Panathinikos Athens, came to scout him as a potential signing for the club. Panathinaikos' head coach at that time, Kostas Mourouzis decided that he wanted to sign Kefalos, and also advised the-then head coach of the senior Greek national team, Faidon Matthaiou, to invite Kefalos to participate in the training of the Greek national team. Kefalos ended up moving from the US to Greece, and joining Panathinaikos' basketball team for the 1969–70 season. Kefalos was a part of the famous Panathinaikos 5Ks era players, which included himself, Takis Koroneos, Apostolos Kontos, Georgios Kolokithas, and Dimitris Kokolakis, and the Panathinaikos 4Ks era players, which included all of the same players except for Kolokithas.

With Panathinaikos, Kefalos won five straight Greek League championships, and a total of six overall, as he won the Greek League title in the years 1971, 1972, 1973, 1974, 1975, and 1977. He was also a member of the Panathinaikos team that made it to the semi-finals round of Europe's top-tier level European-wide club competition, the FIBA European Champions' Cup, which is now known as the EuroLeague, in the 1971–72 season. With Panathinaikos, he competed in a total of six EuroLeague seasons (1971–72, 1972–73, 1973–74, 1974–75, 1975–76, and 1977–78). Kefalos retired from playing club basketball, after playing his last game against Maroussi Athens, in December 1978. Kefalos scored a total of 1,755 points in 174 games played in the Greek Basket League, for a career scoring average of 10.1 points per game.

== National team career ==
Kefalos was a member of the senior men's Greek national team. He first represented Greece at the 1970 Balkan Championship, where he averaged 9.3 points per game. Kefalos also played with Greece at the 1973 FIBA EuroBasket. In 7 games played during that tournament, he averaged 7.7 points per game. Overall, Kefalos had 10 caps with Greece's senior national team, in which he scored a total of 82 points, for a scoring average of 8.2 points per game.

== Coaching career ==
After he retired from playing club basketball, Kefalos worked as a basketball coach. He was first an assistant coach with the Greek Basket League club Panathinaikos Athens, and then later also the same club's head coach. While he was Panathinaikos' head coach, he won the Greek Cup title in 1983. He was also the head coach of the Greek club Ilysiakos Athens, and he led them to the Greek 2nd Division championship title in 1986.

== Death ==
Kefalos died in Greece, on 4 July 2022, at the age of 76.
