= 1992–93 FIBA European Cup =

- League: FIBA European Cup
- Sport: Basketball

Final
- Champions: (Greece) Sato Aris
- Runners-up: (Turkey) Efes Pilsen

FIBA European Cup seasons
- ← 1991–92 1993–94 →

The 1992–93 FIBA European Cup was the twenty-seventh edition of FIBA's 2nd-tier level European-wide professional club basketball competition.

== First round ==
Team 1	Agg.	Team 2	1st leg	2nd leg
Pantterit (Finland)	190–175	(Slovenia) Tinex Norik Medvode	99–85	91–90
Tallinna Asto (Estonia)	172–178	(Romania) Dinamo București	86–85	86–93
Luxol Fitgar (Malta)	140–204	(Bulgaria) Slavia Sofia	82–104	58–100
Möllersdorf Traiskirchen (Austria)	187–221	(Germany) TTL Bamberg	104–108	83–113
Bioveta Brno (Czechoslovakia)	135–189	(Netherlands) Pro-Specs EBBC	73–101	62–88
Tunsgram-Honvéd (Hungary)	218–109	(Albania) Dinamo Tirana	103–47	115–62
Bobcat Gent (Belgium)	152–161	(Turkey) Nasaş	78–81	74–80

== Second round ==
Team 1	Agg.	Team 2	1st leg	2nd leg
Pantterit (Finland)	182–203	(Switzerland) Pully	77–91	105–112
Dinamo București (Romania)	4–0*	(Federal Republic of Yugoslavia) Spartak Subotica	2–0	2–0
Slavia Sofia (Bulgaria)	124–176	(Italy) Stefanel Trieste	71–75	53–101
TTL Bamberg (Germany)	117–150	(Spain) NatWest Zaragoza	66–69	51–81
Stroitel Samara (Russia)	172–196	(Netherlands) Pro-Specs EBBC	91–101	81–95
Tunsgram-Honvéd (Hungary)	202–172	(Ukraine) Korabel' Nikolaev	108–76	94–96
Nasaş (Turkey)	191–194	(Portugal) Ovarense	98–92	93–102
Atletas (Lithuania)	182–192	(Israel) Hapoel Galil Elyon	87–94	95–98
RTI Minsk (Belarus)	129–224	(Greece) Sato Aris	59–117	70–107
T71 Dudelange (Luxembourg)	98–206	(France) Pitch Cholet	53–114	45–92
Achilleas Kaimakli (Cyprus)	160–172	(Croatia) Slobodna Dalmacija	90–86	70–86

^{*}Spartak Subotica was drawn for the competition but was not allowed to compete due to UN embargo on FR Yugoslavia. Dinamo București went through with a walkover.

== Third round ==
- Wild card to participate in the European Cup for the Loser clubs* of the 1/16 finals of the 1992–93 FIBA European League.

*Smelt Olimpija, ASK Brocēni, Guildford Kings, Efes Pilsen, USK Praha, CSKA Moscow, Benfica, CSKA Sofia, Hapoel Tel Aviv, Śląsk Wrocław, NMKY Helsinki and Budivelnyk.

Team 1	Agg.	Team 2	1st leg	2nd leg
Smelt Olimpija (Slovenia)	202–188	(Switzerland) Pully	107–86	95–102
Pro-Specs EBBC (Netherlands)	167–168	(Spain) NatWest Zaragoza	79–73	88–95
ASK Brocēni (Latvia)	156–153	(England) Guildford Kings	80–77	76–76
Efes Pilsen (Turkey)	177–118	(Romania) Dinamo București	96–54	81–64
USK Praha (Czechoslovakia)	185–221	(Russia) CSKA Moscow	96–113	89–108
Benfica (Portugal)	195–163	(Bulgaria) CSKA Sofia	111–83	84–80
Hapoel Tel Aviv (Israel)	154–143	(Hungary) Tunsgram-Honvéd	92–74	62–69
Stefanel Trieste (Italy)	163–168	(Israel) Hapoel Galil Elyon	69–69	94–99
Śląsk Wrocław (Poland)	155–192	(Greece) Sato Aris	80–90	75–102
Ovarense (Portugal)	152–171	(France) Pitch Cholet	91–85	61–86
NMKY Helsinki (Finland)	161–170	(Ukraine) Budivelnyk	89–100	72–70

Automatically qualified to quarterfinal round

- (Croatia) Slobodna Dalmacija

== Quarterfinals round ==
Key to colors
Top two places in the group advance to semifinals

=== Group A ===
	Team	Pld	Pts	W	L	PF	PA	PD
1.	(Turkey) Efes Pilsen	10	19	9	1	787	707	+80
2.	(Spain) NatWest Zaragoza	10	17	7	3	788	701	+87
3.	(Slovenia) Smelt Olimpija	10	15	5	5	798	813	-15
4.	(Russia) CSKA Moscow	10	13	3	7	871	902	-31
5.	(Israel) Hapoel Tel Aviv	10	13	3	7	816	837	-21
6.	(Latvia) ASK Brocēni	10	13	3	7	823	923	-100

=== Group B ===
	Team	Pld	Pts	W	L	PF	PA	PD
1.	(Greece) Sato Aris	10	19	9	1	815	689	+126
2.	(Israel) Hapoel Galil Elyon	10	17	7	3	828	798	+30
3.	(Croatia) Slobodna Dalmacija	10	17	7	3	751	708	+43
4.	(Portugal) Benfica	10	14	4	6	768	770	-2
5.	(France) Pitch Cholet	10	12	2	8	758	844	-86
6.	(Ukraine) Budivelnyk	10	11	1	9	739	850	-111

== Semifinals ==
Seeded teams played games 2 and 3 at home.

Team 1	Agg.	Team 2	1st leg	2nd leg	3rd leg
Hapoel Galil Elyon (Israel)	0–2	(Turkey) Efes Pilsen	71–73	62–65	{{{8}}}
NatWest Zaragoza (Spain)	0–2	(Greece) Sato Aris	84–86	66–82	{{{8}}}

== Final ==
March 16, Palazzetto dello sport Parco Ruffini, Turin

Team 1	Score	Team 2
Efes Pilsen (Turkey)	48–50	(Greece) Sato Aris

== Rosters ==
(Greece) Aris: Panagiotis Giannakis (C), Giorgios Gasparis, J. J. Anderson, Roy Tarpley, Michail Misunov; Dinos Angelidis, Vangelis Vourtzoumis, Memos Ioannou. Coach: Zvi Sherf
(Turkey) Efes Pilsen: Petar Naumoski, Ufuk Sarica, Volkan Aydin, Larry Richard, Tamer Oyguc (C); Taner Korucu, Oktay Ozturk. Coach: Aydın Örs

1992–93 FIBA European Cup Champions

Sato Aris
1st title
