= Manthos Katsoulis =

Greek basketball player

Personal information
- Born: 20 July 1956 (age 70) Kavala, Kingdom of Greece
- Listed height: 2.05 m (6 ft 9 in)
- Listed weight: 100 kg (220 lb)

Career information
- College: McGill (1982–1983)
- Playing career: 1973–1994
- Position: Power forward / center
- Number: 8

Career history
- 1973–1974: KAOD
- 1974–1988: PAOK
- 1988–1990: Aris
- 1990–1993: Iraklis
- 1993–1994: Makedonikos

Career highlights
- 2× Greek League champion (1989, 1990); 3× Greek Cup winner (1984, 1989, 1990)
Medals
Representing Greece
Men's basketball
Mediterranean Games
| Gold medal – first place | 1979 Yugoslavia |

Mathaios "Manthos" Katsoulis (Greek: Μάνθος Κατσούλης; born 20 July 1956) is a Greek former professional basketball player.

== College career ==
Katsoulis played college basketball at McGill University, with the McGill Redmen (1982–1983).

== Professional career ==
Katsoulis began his club career with AO Dramas. He then played with PAOK from 1974 to 1988, having a leading role in the team. In 1984, he won the Greek Cup with PAOK, while playing in one of the most historic Greek Cup finals against Aris.

In 1988, he moved to Aris, and with them he won two Greek League championships (1989, 1990) and 2 more Greek Cups (1989, 1990). With Aris, he also played in two EuroLeague Final Fours (1989 Munich and 1990 Zaragoza). In 1990, he moved to Iraklis, and in 1993, he moved to Makedonikos.

He finished his pro club career with a total of 5,356 points scored in the top-tier level Greek League.

== National team career ==
Katsoulis was a member of the senior men's Greek national basketball team from 1976 to 1984. With Greece's senior men's national team, he had 165 caps, and he scored 1,364 points (8.3 per game). He was also the captain of the Greek senior national team.

He won the gold medal at the 1979 Mediterranean Games. He also played at the 1979 EuroBasket, the 1981 EuroBasket, and the 1983 EuroBasket.
