= Giorgos Kastrinakis =

Greek-American basketball player

Personal information
- Born: June 9, 1950 (age 76) Framingham, Massachusetts, U.S.
- Listed height: 6 ft 8.5 in (2.04 m)
- Listed weight: 240 lb (109 kg)

Career information
- College: American International
- Position: Power forward / center
- Number: 13

Career history
- 1972–1984: Olympiacos
- Ilysiakos

Career highlights
- As player: 2× Greek League champion (1976, 1978); 4× Greek Cup winner (1976–1978, 1980); 2× Greek Cup Finals Top Scorer (1976, 1980)
Medals
Men's Basketball
Representing Greece
Mediterranean Games
Gold medal – first place	1979 Yugoslavia

Giorgos Kastrinakis (alternate spellings: Georgios, George) (Greek: Γιώργος Καστρινάκης) (born June 9, 1950) is a retired Greek American professional basketball player. He played basketball professionally for many years in the Greek Basket League. At 2.04 m tall, he played as a power forward-center. During his basketball playing career, Kastrinakis was mainly known for his spectacular dunking ability.

== College career ==
Kastrinakis played college basketball at American International College, with the Yellow Jackets.

== Club career ==
Kastrinakis was one of two long-time stars on the Olympiacos Piraeus basketball team, along with fellow Greek American Steve Giatzoglou, in the 1970s. With Olympiacos, Kastrinakis won two Greek League championships in 1976 and 1978, as well as four Greek Cups in 1976, 1977, 1978, and 1980. He was the Greek Cup Finals Top Scorer in 1976 and 1980. He also played with Ilysiakos.

== National team career ==
Kastrinakis was one of the stars of the senior Greek national basketball team during the 1970s. With Greece, Kastrinakis played at the EuroBasket 1973, the EuroBasket 1975, the EuroBasket 1979, and the EuroBasket 1981.

== Awards and accomplishments ==
=== Pro clubs ===
- 2× Greek League Champion: (1976, 1978)
- 4× Greek Cup Winner: (1976, 1977, 1978, 1980)
- 2× Greek Cup Finals Top Scorer: (1976, 1980)

=== Greek national team ===
- 1979 Mediterranean Games: Gold
