= Kimon Kokorogiannis =

Greek basketball player (born 1953)

Personal information
- Born: 26 September 1953 (age 73)

Career information
- Playing career: 1974–1988

Career history
- 1974–1983: Olympiacos
- 1983–1988: Panellinios

Career highlights
- As player: 2× Greek League champion (1976, 1978); 4× Greek Cup winner (1976–1978, 1980); Greek 2nd Division champion (1987)

Kimon "Kimonas" Kokorogiannis (Greek: Κίμων "Κίμωνας" Κοκορόγιαννης) (born 26 September 1953) is a former Greek professional basketball player. He played basketball professionally in the Greek Basket League.

== Playing career ==
Kokorogiannis joined Olympiacos Piraeus for the 1974–75 season. He played with Olympiacos through the 1982–83 season, and with them, he won two Greek League championships (1976, 1978), and four Greek Cups (1976, 1977, 1978, 1980). He also played in all three league tier levels of European-wide club basketball, playing in the 3rd-tier level FIBA Korać Cup, the 2nd-tier level FIBA Saporta Cup, and the top-tier level EuroLeague. He also played with the Greek League club Panellinios.

== After basketball ==
After his retirement he became a sport agent. He was representing Thodoris Zagorakis for many years.

== Awards and Accomplishments ==
- 2× Greek League Champion: (1976, 1978)
- 4× Greek Cup Winner: (1976, 1977, 1978, 1980)
