= Kostas Tsartsaris =

Greek basketball player and coach

Kostas Tsartsaris Κώστας Τσαρτσαρής
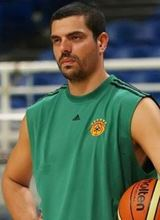
- Tsartsaris, at a Panathinaikos practice, in 2013.

Personal information
- Born: October 17, 1979 (age 47) Veria, Greece
- Listed height: 6 ft 10.75 in (2.10 m)
- Listed weight: 255 lb (116 kg)

Career information
- Playing career: 1997–2013
- Position: Power forward / center
- Number: 12
- Coaching career: 2014–present

Career history

Playing
- 1997–1998: U.M.F. Grindavik
- 1998–1999: Near East
- 1999–2002: Peristeri
- 2002–2013: Panathinaikos

Coaching
- 2014–2016: Panathinaikos (cadets)
- 2016: Panathinaikos (assistant)

Career highlights
- As a player: 3× EuroLeague champion (2007, 2009, 2011); 2× Triple Crown winner (2007, 2009); FIBA EuroStar (2007); 10× Greek League champion (2003–2011, 2013); 8× Greek Cup winner (2003, 2005–2012, 2013); 7× Greek All-Star (2001, 2002, 2004–2008); All-Greek League Team (2004); Greek League Best Young Player (1999); 3× Greek Cup Finals MVP (2006–2008); Greek Cup Finals Top Scorer (2007); Icelandic Cup winner (1998); Professional Greek League career stats leaders: Greek League all-time leader in total rebounds
Medals
| Event | 1st | 2nd | 3rd |
|---|---|---|---|
| FIBA World Cup | 0 | 1 | 0 |
| FIBA Stanković World Cup | 1 | 0 | 0 |
| FIBA EuroBasket | 1 | 0 | 0 |
| Total | 2 | 1 | 0 |
Men's basketball
Representing Greece
FIBA World Cup
| Silver medal – second place | 2006 Japan | |
FIBA Stanković World Cup
| Gold medal – first place | 2006 China | |
FIBA EuroBasket
| Gold medal – first place | 2005 Serbia & Montenegro | |

Konstantinos "Kostas" Tsartsaris (Greek: Κωνσταντίνος "Κώστας" Τσαρτσαρής; born October 17, 1979, in Veria, Greece), is a Greek former professional basketball player and coach, who spent most of his playing career with the Greek League team Panathinaikos. At 6 ft 10 3/4 in (2.10 m) tall and 115.4 kg (255 lb.) in weight, he played at the mainly at the power forward position, but he could also play at the center position, if needed.

== Professional career ==
Tsartsaris was first noticed by professional Greek clubs as a wonder kid, when he was playing in the lower divisions for the team of Filippos Verias. Because Filippos did not allow him to move to another Greek club, he chose at the age of 17 to play for Úrvalsdeild karla club U.M.F. Grindavik for the 1997–98 season. Throughout the season, he averaged 20.7 points, 11.3 rebounds, and 4.5 blocks per game.

He returned to Greece in 1998, and he was signed on a free transfer by Near East. The following year, he moved to Peristeri, and in 2002, he moved to Panathinaikos. With Panathinaikos, he was the Greek Cup MVP for 3 consecutive years (2006, 2007, 2008).

In June 2013, after conquering the double in Greece, by winning both the Greek League and Greek Cup in the same season, Tsartsaris announced his decision to finish his playing career, after wearing Panathinaikos' jersey for 11 successful years.

== National team career ==
Tsartsaris was a member of the senior men's Greek national basketball team that won the gold medal at the 2005 EuroBasket and the silver medal at the 2006 FIBA World Championship. He also played at the 2004 Summer Olympics, the 2007 EuroBasket, the 2008 Summer Olympics, and the 2010 FIBA World Championship.

== Coaching career ==
Tsartsaris began his coaching career in 2014, working at the young cadet academy school level. On April 21, 2016, it was revealed that Tsartsaris would become an assistant coach of Argyris Pedoulakis, with Panathinaikos.

== Career statistics ==
Legend
| GP | Games played | GS | Games started | MPG | Minutes per game |
| FG% | Field-goal percentage | 3P% | 3-point field-goal percentage | FT% | Free-throw percentage |
| RPG | Rebounds per game | APG | Assists per game | SPG | Steals per game |
| BPG | Blocks per game | PPG | Points per game | PIR | Performance index rating |
| **Bold** | Career high |

=== EuroLeague ===
| † | Denotes seasons in which Tsartsaris won the EuroLeague |

| Year | Team | GP | GS | MPG | FG% | 3P% | FT% | RPG | APG | SPG | BPG | PPG | PIR |
|---|---|---|---|---|---|---|---|---|---|---|---|---|---|
| 2000–01 | Peristeri | 11 | 9 | **30.9** | .506 | .440 | .784 | 6.2 | **1.9** | .5 | .3 | **11.1** | **13.5** |
| 2001–02 | Peristeri | 14 | 12 | 29.5 | .450 | .143 | .645 | **6.3** | 1.7 | **1.0** | **.6** | 10.2 | 11.9 |
| 2002-03 | Panathinaikos | 19 | 6 | 12.4 | **.648** | .333 | .609 | 2.2 | .4 | .3 | .3 | 4.5 | 4.6 |
| 2003–04 | Panathinaikos | 20 | 13 | 21.8 | .555 | .286 | .707 | 5.2 | .9 | .7 | .4 | 8.8 | 9.8 |
| 2004–05 | Panathinaikos | 25 | **21** | 19.1 | .531 | .364 | .646 | 4.3 | .8 | .6 | .4 | 7.7 | 8.3 |
| 2005–06 | Panathinaikos | 23 | **21** | 18.3 | .477 | **.463** | .667 | 3.0 | 1.0 | .5 | .4 | 6.6 | 6.3 |
| 2006–07† | Panathinaikos | 23 | 15 | 19.2 | .454 | .244 | .694 | 4.5 | 1.3 | .6 | .5 | 6.6 | 7.5 |
| 2007–08 | Panathinaikos | 12 | 7 | 16.3 | .554 | .444 | .957 | 3.4 | .9 | .2 | .3 | 8.0 | 10.0 |
| 2008–09† | Panathinaikos | 19 | 12 | 13.2 | .400 | .286 | .542 | 3.4 | .5 | .6 | .3 | 3.5 | 4.3 |
| 2009–10 | Panathinaikos | 6 | 1 | 13.0 | .357 | .333 | **1.000** | 2.7 | .8 | .2 | .2 | 2.7 | 3.3 |
| 2010–11† | Panathinaikos | 22 | 8 | 15.6 | .560 | .294 | .767 | 3.0 | .6 | .6 | .2 | 5.5 | 5.5 |
| 2011–12 | Panathinaikos | 17 | 2 | 14.2 | .379 | .231 | .800 | 2.7 | .5 | .4 | .2 | 4.2 | 4.1 |
| 2012–13 | Panathinaikos | **28** | 10 | 18.2 | .442 | .222 | .585 | 3.1 | .9 | .4 | .1 | 3.8 | 3.6 |
| Career | | 239 | 137 | 18.4 | .493 | .320 | .693 | 3.8 | .9 | .5 | .3 | 6.3 | 6.8 |

== Awards and accomplishments ==
=== Pro playing career ===
- Icelandic Cup Winner: (1998)
- Greek League Best Young Player: (1999)
- 7× Greek League All-Star: (2001, 2002, 2004, 2005, 2006, 2007, 2008)
- 10× Greek League Champion: (2003, 2004, 2005, 2006, 2007, 2008, 2009, 2010, 2011, 2013)
- 8× Greek Cup Winner: (2003, 2005, 2006, 2007, 2008, 2009, 2012, 2013)
- Greek League Best Five: (2004)
- 3× Greek Cup Finals MVP: (2006, 2007, 2008)
- Greek Cup Finals Top Scorer: (2007)
- 3× EuroLeague champion: (2007, 2009, 2011)
- 2× Triple Crown Winner: (2007, 2009)
- Professional Greek League all-time leader in total rebounds

=== Greek senior national team ===
- 6× Acropolis Tournament Champion: (2002, 2005, 2006, 2007, 2008, 2010)
- 2005 EuroBasket: Gold
- 2006 FIBA Stanković World Cup: Gold
- 2006 FIBA World Championship: Silver
- FIBA EuroStar: (2007)
