= Georgios Balogiannis =

Greek basketball player

Personal information
- Born: January 19, 1971 (age 55) Thessaloniki, Greece
- Listed height: 6 ft 6.5 in (1.99 m)
- Listed weight: 220 lb (100 kg)

Career information
- Playing career: 1988–2005
- Position: Shooting guard
- Number: 9, 15

Career history
- 1988–1992: VAO
- 1992–2000: PAOK
- 2000–2003: Panathinaikos
- 2003–2004: Makedonikos
- 2005: PAOK

Career highlights
- EuroLeague champion (2002); FIBA Korać Cup champion (1994); 2× Greek League champion (2001, 2003); 3× Greek Cup winner (1995, 1999, 2003); Greek League All-Star (1998); Greek All-Star Game 3 Point Shootout Champion (2004)

Georgios Balogiannis (alternate spelling: Giorgos, Ballogianis, Mpalogiannis) (Greek: Γιώργος Μπαλογιάννης; born January 17, 1971, in Thessaloniki, Greece) is a retired Greek professional basketball player.

== Professional career ==
Balogiannis played for VAO from 1988 to 1992. In 1993, he moved to PAOK. Balogiannis won the Korać Cup in 1994, and 2 Greek Cups.

In 2000, Balogiannis moved to Panathinaikos, and with them he won 2 Greek League championships (2001, 2003) and 1 Greek Cup (2003). He also played in the FIBA SuproLeague Final in 2001.

In the 2003–04 season, Balogiannis played with Makedonikos, and the next year he returned to PAOK, to play one more year.

== National team career ==
Balogiannis was a member of the senior men's Greek national basketball team that finished in 4th place at the 1998 FIBA World Championship. He also played at EuroBasket 1999.
