= Greek Basketball Cup Finals MVP =

The Greek Basketball Cup Finals MVP is an annual award that is given to the most valuable player of the Finals of the Greek Basketball Cup, which is the top-tier level national domestic professional men's cup competition of the sport of basketball, in the country of Greece. The Greek Basketball Cup is contested between the top seven placed teams from each first half season of the top-tier level Greek Basket League, and the winners of the second-tier level Greek national basketball cup competition, the Greek UNICEF Cup.

== Greek Basketball Cup Finals Top Scorers and MVPs ==
Since the first Greek Cup in 1976, the Top Scorer of the Greek Cup Finals is given an award, regardless of whether he plays on the winning or losing team. Since 1995, a Finals MVP is also named at the conclusion of the Finals.

(X)	Denotes the number of multiple times that the player was the Top Scorer or MVP.

Season	Greek Cup Finals Top Scorer	Club	Greek Cup Finals MVP	Club
1975–76	(Greece) / (United States) Georgios Kastrinakis	Olympiacos		
1976–77	(Greece) / (United States) Steve Giatzoglou	Olympiacos		
1977–78	(Greece) / (United States) Steve Giatzoglou (2×)	Olympiacos		
1978–79	(Greece) / (United States) Steve Giatzoglou (3×)	Olympiacos		
1979–80	(Greece) / (United States) Steve Giatzoglou (4×) & (Greece) / (United States) Georgios Kastrinakis (2×)	Olympiacos		
1980–81	(Greece) Vassilis Goumas	AEK		
1981–82	(Greece) Vangelis Alexandris	PAOK		
1982–83	(Greece) Takis Koroneos	Panathinaikos		
1983–84	(Greece) Nikos Stavropoulos	PAOK		
1984–85	(Greece) Panagiotis Giannakis	Aris		
1985–86	(Greece) / (United States) David Stergakos	Panathinaikos		
1986–87	(Greece) / (United States) Nikos Galis	Aris		
1987–88	(Greece) Panagiotis Giannakis (2×)	Aris		
1988–89	(Greece) / (United States) Nikos Galis (2×)	Aris		
1989–90	(Greece) / (United States) Nikos Galis (3×)	Aris		
1990–91	(Greece) Georgios Gasparis & (United States) Ken Barlow	Panionios & PAOK		
1991–92	(Greece) / (United States) Nikos Galis (4×)	Aris		
1992–93	(Greece) / (United States) Nikos Galis (5×)	Panathinaikos		
1993–94	(Federal Republic of Yugoslavia) Žarko Paspalj	Olympiacos		
1994–95	(Federal Republic of Yugoslavia) / (Greece) Bane Prelević	PAOK	(Federal Republic of Yugoslavia) Bane Prelević	PAOK
1995–96	(United States) Dominique Wilkins	Panathinaikos	(United States) Dominique Wilkins	Panathinaikos
1996–97	(United States) Harold Ellis	Apollon Patras	(United States) David Rivers	Olympiacos
1997–98	(Greece) Panagiotis Liadelis	Aris	(Greece) Panagiotis Liadelis	Aris
1998–99	(United States) Frankie King	PAOK	(United States) Walter Berry	PAOK
1999–00	(Federal Republic of Yugoslavia) Željko Rebrača	Panathinaikos	(Federal Republic of Yugoslavia) Željko Rebrača	Panathinaikos
2000–01	(Turkey) İbrahim Kutluay	AEK	(Turkey) İbrahim Kutluay	AEK
2001–02	(United States) Alphonso Ford	Olympiacos	(United States) Alphonso Ford	Olympiacos
2002–03	(Greece) Fragiskos Alvertis	Panathinaikos	(Greece) Fragiskos Alvertis	Panathinaikos
2003–04	(United States) Smush Parker	Aris	(Greece) Nestoras Kommatos	Aris
2004–05	(United States) DeJuan Collins	Aris	(Slovenia) Jaka Lakovič	Panathinaikos
2005–06	(Bulgaria) / (United States) Roderick Blakney	Maroussi	(Greece) Kostas Tsartsaris	Panathinaikos
2006–07	(Greece) Kostas Tsartsaris	Panathinaikos	(Greece) Kostas Tsartsaris (2×)	Panathinaikos
2007–08	(United States) Lynn Greer	Olympiacos	(Greece) Kostas Tsartsaris (3×)	Panathinaikos
2008–09	(Greece) Dimitris Diamantidis	Panathinaikos	(Greece) Dimitris Diamantidis	Panathinaikos
2009–10	(Serbia) Miloš Teodosić	Olympiacos	(Serbia) Miloš Teodosić	Olympiacos
2010–11	(Serbia) Miloš Teodosić (2×)	Olympiacos	(Serbia) Miloš Teodosić (2×)	Olympiacos
2011–12	(Greece) Giorgos Printezis	Olympiacos	(Lithuania) Šarūnas Jasikevičius	Panathinaikos
2012–13	(Greece) Dimitris Diamantidis (2×)	Panathinaikos	(Croatia) Roko Ukić	Panathinaikos
2013–14	(United States) Ramel Curry	Panathinaikos	(United States) Ramel Curry	Panathinaikos
2014–15	(United States) Toarlyn Fitzpatrick	Apollon Patras	(Greece) Loukas Mavrokefalidis	Panathinaikos
2015–16	(Greece) Gaios Skordilis	Faros Keratsiniou	(Greece) Dimitris Diamantidis (2×)	Panathinaikos
2016–17	(United States) Will Cummings	Aris	(Dominican Republic) / (United States) James Feldeine	Panathinaikos
2017–18	(Greece) Vassilis Spanoulis	Olympiacos	(United States) Manny Harris	AEK
2018–19	(United States) Will Hatcher	PAOK	(Greece) / (United States) Nick Calathes	Panathinaikos
2019–20	(United States) Kendrick Ray	AEK	(Greece) Nikos Zisis	AEK
2020–21	(Greece) Ioannis Papapetrou	Panathinaikos	(Greece) Ioannis Papapetrou	Panathinaikos
2021–22	(Serbia) Nemanja Nedović	Panathinaikos	(Greece) / (United States) Tyler Dorsey	Olympiacos
2022–23	(United States) / (Bosnia and Herzegovina) Alec Peters	Olympiacos	(Bulgaria) / (Greece) Sasha Vezenkov	Olympiacos
2023–24	(Greece) Dinos Mitoglou	Panathinaikos	(France) Moustapha Fall	Olympiacos
2024–25	(Bulgaria) / (Greece) Sasha Vezenkov	Olympiacos	(Greece) Kostas Sloukas	Panathinaikos
2025–26	(Bulgaria) / (Greece) Sasha Vezenkov (2×)	Olympiacos	(United States) Nigel Hayes-Davis	Panathinaikos

== Multiple Greek Cup Finals Top Scorers ==
Greek Cup Finals Top Scorer	Number Of Times Being Greek Cup Finals Top Scorer
(Greece) / (United States) Nikos Galis	(5×)
(Greece) / (United States) Steve Giatzoglou	(4×)
(Greece) Dimitris Diamantidis	(2×)
(Serbia) Miloš Teodosić	(2×)
(Greece) Panagiotis Giannakis	(2×)
(Greece) / (United States) Georgios Kastrinakis	(2×)
(Bulgaria) / (Greece) Sasha Vezenkov	(2×)

== Multiple Greek Cup Finals MVP winners ==
Greek Cup Finals MVP	Number Of Times Being Greek Cup Finals MVP
(Greece) Kostas Tsartsaris	(3×)
(Greece) Dimitris Diamantidis	(2×)
(Serbia) Miloš Teodosić	(2×)

== See also ==
- Greek Basketball Cup
- Greek Basket League
