= Takis Karatzoulidis =

Greek basketball player

Personal information
- Born: June 2, 1957 (age 69) Thessaloniki, Greece
- Listed height: 6 ft 8.5 in (2.04 m)
- Listed weight: 240 lb (109 kg)

Career information
- Playing career: 1971–1992
- Position: Power forward

Career history
- 1971–1985: Iraklis Thessaloniki
- 1985–1990: PAOK
- 1991–1992: Dimokritos
Medals
Men's basketball
Representing Greece
Mediterranean Games
Gold medal – first place	1979 Yugoslavia

Dimitris "Takis" Karatzoulidis (Greek: Δημήτρης "Τάκης" Καρατζουλίδης; born June 2, 1957) is a Greek former professional basketball player and coach.

== Professional career ==
Karatzoulidis started his career from Iraklis in 1971. With Iraklis, he played in the Greek Cup final in 1981, and he scored 29 points. Despite his good performance, Iraklis was defeated by AEK Athens, by a score of 84–78.

In 1985, he transferred to PAOK. His transfer was the second most expensive in the history of the Greek Basket League at the time, and cost fifty million Greek drachma. Karatzoulidis played with PAOK for five years, but his playing efficiency didn't match to his player cost. One of his best games with PAOK, was in a win against Aris, by a score of 81–78. Karatzoulidis scored 11 points and had 10 rebounds. Karatzoulidis also played with Dimokritos, in the Greek 2nd Division, during the 1991–92 season.

== National team career ==
Karatzoulidis was a member of Greece's junior Under-16, and Under-18 national teams. He played at the 1973 FIBA Europe Under-16 Championship.

He was also a member of the senior Greek national basketball team. With Greece's senior national team, he had 102 caps, and scored a total of 450 points. He played with Greece at the 1979 EuroBasket, the 1980 European Olympic Qualifying Tournament, the 1981 EuroBasket, and the 1984 European Olympic Qualifying Tournament. With Greece, he also won the gold medal at the 1979 Mediterranean Games.

== Coaching career ==
After, his retirement from playing basketball, Karatzoulidis became a member of the Greek player veterans and became a basketball coach. In 1997, he began working as a basketball academy coach.

== Personal life ==
Karatzoulidis studied Economics at the Aristotle University of Thessaloniki.
