= Giannis Ioannidis =

Greek basketball player (1945–2023)

Personal information
- Born: 26 February 1945 Thessaloniki, Greece
- Died: 4 October 2023 (aged 78) Athens, Greece

Career information
- Playing career: 1960–1978
- Position: Point guard
- Number: 5
- Coaching career: 1978–2003

Career history

Playing
- 1960–1978: Aris

Coaching
- 1977: Ergotelis
- 1978–1979: Aris
- 1979–1981: G.S. Larissas
- 1980–1981: Greece
- 1982–1990: Aris
- 1991–1996: Olympiacos
- 1996–1998: AEK
- 1999–2000: Olympiacos
- 2002–2003: Greece

Career highlights
- As head coach: 50 Greatest EuroLeague Contributors (nominee); Greek League Hall of Fame (2022); 12× Greek League champion (1979, 1983, 1985–1990, 1993–1996); 6× Greek Cup winner (1985, 1987–1990, 1994); Greek Super Cup winner (1986); Greek 2nd Division champion (1980)

Giannis Ioannidis (alternate spellings: Ioannis, Yiannis, Yannis) (Greek: Γιάννης Ιωαννίδης; 26 February 1945 – 4 October 2023) was a Greek basketball player, professional basketball coach, and Greece New Democracy (ND) politician. Ioannidis was generally considered to be the best Greek professional basketball club head coach of all-time, since he was the one with the most top-tier level major Greek national club titles won (19 in total, 14 with Aris, and 5 with Olympiacos). In all competition levels overall, he won a total of 20 club league titles as a head coach. He also holds the all-time record for the most wins as a head coach, in the history of the Greek Championship.

== Biography ==
Giannis Ioannidis was born in Thessaloniki on 26 February 1945. He studied Agriculture in the Faculty of Geotechnical Sciences at the Aristotle University of Thessaloniki. Ioannidis was married and had one daughter. He died on 4 October 2023, at the age of 78.

== Basketball career ==
=== Playing career ===
During his youth, Ioannidis became a member of the youth clubs of Aris, in 1959. He joined the senior men's team of Aris, of the Greek Basket League, in 1960. He played with Aris in the Greek League, until 1978, when he retired. With 4,970 points scored as a member of Aris, he is the second highest scorer of all-time in the history of the club, after Nikos Galis.

=== Coaching career ===
Still in his playing years, Ioannidis agreed to assume the head coach position at Cretan club Ergotelis in 1977, after being offered the job by longtime friend and fellow Aristotle University of Thessaloniki student Manolis Nikiforakis. Travelling back and forth between Thessaloniki and Crete, Ioannidis managed to promote the club to the Greek B Basket League.

After retiring from playing basketball, Ioannidis became a full-time basketball coach. He eventually became the head coach of Aris, and with the club, he won a total of eight Greek League championships, five Greek Cups, and one Greek Super Cup. With Aris, he also participated at three consecutive FIBA European Champions' Cup (EuroLeague) Final Fours. Later, he coached Olympiacos, where he won four consecutive Greek League championships, a Greek Cup, and also participated at two consecutive editions of the FIBA EuroLeague's Finals.

Ioannidis was the architect of the most glorious victory of Olympiacos, which came against Panathinaikos, in the last game of the 1995–96 Greek League Finals, with a winning score of 73–38. That was his last game coaching with Olympiacos at that time. The next year, he joined AEK, where he stayed for two seasons, and with them he managed to reach one more Final of the FIBA EuroLeague. After a short come-back to Olympiacos, he finished his coaching career with the senior men's Greek national team, which he coached at the 2003 EuroBasket.

=== Teams coached ===
- Ergotelis: 1977
- Aris: 1978–79
- G.S. Larissas: 1979–81
- Greece: 1980–81
- Aris: 1982–90
- Olympiacos: 1991–96
- AEK: 1996–98
- Olympiacos: 1999–00
- Greece: 2002–03

== Political career ==
Ioannidis announced his retirement from professional basketball in the year 2004, before he was elected a New Democracy MP for the Thessaloniki A constituency in the 2004 general election, and re-elected in 2007. Since September 2007, he has been Deputy Minister Of Culture Responsible for Sports.

In the 2014 regional election, he challenged incumbent Apostolos Tzitzikostas as Regional Governor of Central Macedonia, after Tzitzikostas had lost his party's support. He was however clearly defeated in the second round. At the January 2015 legislative election, he also lost his parliamentary seat.

== Awards and accomplishments ==
=== As a player ===
- 2nd highest career scorer of all-time in the history of the club Aris, with 4,970 total points scored.

=== Titles won ===
- 12× Greek League Champion: 1979, 1983, 1985, 1986, 1987, 1988, 1989, 1990 (with Aris), 1993, 1994, 1995, 1996 (with Olympiacos)
- 6× Greek Cup Winner: 1985, 1987, 1988, 1989, 1990 (with Aris), 1994 (with Olympiacos)
- Greek Super Cup Winner: 1986 (with Aris)
- Greek 2nd Division Champion: 1980 (with Gymnastikos)

=== Other honors ===
- 3× EuroLeague Finals Finalist: 1994, 1995 (with Olympiacos), 1998 (with AEK)
- 6× EuroLeague Final Four Participation: 1988, 1989, 1990, (with Aris) 1994, 1995 (with Olympiacos), 1998 (with AEK)
- 3× Greek League Finalist: 1984 (with Aris), 1992 (with Olympiacos), 1997 (with AEK)
- 2× Greek Cup Finalist: 1984 (with Aris), 1998 (with AEK)
- Most wins in the history of the Greek League as a head coach, with a total of 418 wins.
