= Miroslav Raičević =

Serbian basketball player and coach

Personal information
- Born: July 13, 1981 (age 45) Vrbas, SR Serbia, SFR Yugoslavia
- Listed height: 6 ft 10 in (2.08 m)
- Listed weight: 250 lb (113 kg)

Career information
- NBA draft: 2003: undrafted
- Playing career: 2000–2016
- Position: Power forward / center
- Coaching career: 2015–present

Career history

Playing
- 2000–2005: Aris Thessaloniki
- 2005–2006: Crvena zvezda
- 2006–2007: Dynamo Moscow
- 2007: Basket Napoli
- 2007–2008: Crvena zvezda
- 2008–2009: Panionios
- 2009–2010: Kavala
- 2010–2011: Enisey Krasnoyarsk
- 2016: Iraklis Thessaloniki

Coaching
- 2015–2019: Iraklis Thessaloniki (assistant)

Career highlights
- FIBA Europe Cup champion (2003); Greek Cup winner (2004); Radivoj Korać Cup champion (2006)

Miroslav Raičević (Serbian Cyrillic: Мирослав Раичевић; born July 13, 1981) is a Serbian professional basketball coach and former player. He also holds Greek citizenship, under the name of Miroslav Marinos-Raitsevits. He played as both a power forward and center.

== Professional career ==
Raičević began his career playing with the youth teams of the Budućnost Peć. In 1998, he moved to the Greek League club Aris Thessaloniki, and he began his professional career there in the year 2000.

In 2003, he won the FIBA Europe Cup championship with Aris, and he scored the final decisive shot in the very last seconds of the final game against Prokom Trefl Sopot. He also won the Greek Cup with Aris, in the year 2004.

He has also played with Red Star Belgrade of the Adriatic League during the 2005–06 season. He won the Serbian Cup with Red Star that season.

In the 2006–07 season, he played with the Russian Super League club Dynamo Moscow. During summer of 2007, he left Dynamo Moscow and joined the Italian League club Eldo Napoli. He then left Napoli and moved back to Red Star, in November 2007.

He joined the Greek EuroLeague club Panionios for the 2008–09 season. In September 2010, he signed with Enisey Krasnoyarsk in Russia, but he was released in January 2011.

After not playing professional basketball for 5 years, and having already started a career in coaching, Raičević resurrected his playing career, as he signed with the Greek A2 team Iraklis, as a player-coach. He made his debut for Iraklis in an away win against Doukas.

== National team career ==
Raičević was an international squad member of the Serbia and Montenegro national team at the 2006 FIBA World Championship.

== Coaching career ==
Raičević became an assistant coach with Iraklis, under the team's head coach, Vangelis Alexandris, in 2015.

== See also ==
- List of KK Crvena zvezda players with 100 games played
