= Greek Basketball Cup =

Men's basketball cup in Greece

- Current season, competition or edition: 2025–26 Greek Basketball Cup
- Sport: Basketball
- Founded: 1975–76 season
- CEO: Andreas Miaoulis
- No. of teams: 28
- Country: Greece
- Continent: (European Union) Europe
- Most recent champions: Panathinaikos (22nd title)
- Most titles: Panathinaikos (22 titles)
- Broadcaster: ERT
- Related competitions: Greek Basketball League; Greek Basketball Super Cup; Greek A2 Basket League
- Website: www.basket.gr

The Greek Basketball Cup or Hellenic Basketball Cup (also stylized as Basket Cup; Greek: Κύπελλο Ελλάδος καλαθοσφαίρισης ανδρών) is the top-tier level annual professional basketball national cup competition in Greece. It is organized by the Hellenic Basketball Federation (E.O.K.).

== History and format ==
There were no official nation-wide Greek Cup competitions prior to the 1975–76 season. However, there was a precursor tournament to the Greek Cup, called the Attica State Cup, which was won by AEK Athens, in the 1966–67 and 1970–71 seasons. The first official Greek Cup took place during the 1975–76 season.

From the 1994–95 to 2003–04 seasons, the Greek Cup tournament used a Final Four format. During that time, the Greek Cup competition format included a total of 62 teams; 14 from the top-tier level Greek Basketball League (GBL), 16 from the 2nd-tier level Greek A2 Basketball League, and 32 teams from the third-tier level Greek B Basketball League.

Through the 2021–22 season, the top six placed teams from the previous season of the Greek Basketball League had an automatic bye to the Greek Cup quarterfinals, while the other eight teams played in preliminary rounds for the other two quarterfinals places. The quarterfinals and onward rounds were played under a single elimination format.

Starting with the 2022–23 Greek Cup tournament, the top seven placed teams of the top-tier level Greek Basketball League's first half of the regular season, and the winners of the 2nd-tier level Greek UNICEF Trophy, compete in a single elimination Final 8 format.

== Cup winners ==
- 1975–76: Olympiacos
- 1976–77: Olympiacos
- 1977–78: Olympiacos
- 1978–79: Panathinaikos
- 1979–80: Olympiacos
- 1980–81: AEK
- 1981–82: Panathinaikos
- 1982–83: Panathinaikos
- 1983–84: PAOK
- 1984–85: Aris
- 1985–86: Panathinaikos
- 1986–87: Aris
- 1987–88: Aris
- 1988–89: Aris
- 1989–90: Aris
- 1990–91: Panionios
- 1991–92: Aris
- 1992–93: Panathinaikos
- 1993–94: Olympiacos
- 1994–95: PAOK Bravo
- 1995–96: Panathinaikos
- 1996–97: Olympiacos
- 1997–98: Aris Moda Bagno
- 1998–99: PAOK
- 1999–00: AEK
- 2000–01: AEK
- 2001–02: Olympiacos
- 2002–03: Panathinaikos
- 2003–04: Aris
- 2004–05: Panathinaikos
- 2005–06: Panathinaikos
- 2006–07: Panathinaikos
- 2007–08: Panathinaikos
- 2008–09: Panathinaikos
- 2009–10: Olympiacos
- 2010–11: Olympiacos
- 2011–12: Panathinaikos
- 2012–13: Panathinaikos
- 2013–14: Panathinaikos
- 2014–15: Panathinaikos
- 2015–16: Panathinaikos
- 2016–17: Panathinaikos
- 2017–18: AEK
- 2018–19: Panathinaikos
- 2019–20: AEK
- 2020–21: Panathinaikos
- 2021–22: Olympiacos
- 2022–23: Olympiacos
- 2023–24: Olympiacos
- 2024–25: Panathinaikos
- 2025–26: Panathinaikos

== Finals ==
Season	Champions	Score	Runners-up	Venue	Location	MVP
(Greece) Greek Basketball Cup
1975–76	Olympiacos	81–69	AEK	Glyfada Indoor Hall	Glyfada, Athens	N/A
1976–77	Olympiacos	103–88	Panionios	Panathinaiko Stadium	Athens	N/A
1977–78	Olympiacos	83–72	AEK	Panathinaiko Stadium	Athens	N/A
1978–79	Panathinaikos	79–72	Olympiacos	Panathinaiko Stadium	Athens	N/A
1979–80	Olympiacos	85–80	AEK	Panathinaiko Stadium	Athens	N/A
1980–81	AEK	84–78	Iraklis	Glyfada Indoor Hall	Glyfada, Athens	N/A
1981–82	Panathinaikos	65–63	PAOK	Alexandrio Melathron	Thessaloniki	N/A
1982–83	Panathinaikos	72–62	Olympiacos	Glyfada Indoor Hall	Glyfada, Athens	N/A
1983–84	PAOK	74–70	Aris	Alexandrio Melathron	Thessaloniki	N/A
1984–85	Aris	86–70	Panathinaikos	Peace and Friendship Stadium	Piraeus	N/A
1985–86	Panathinaikos	88–78	Olympiacos	Peace and Friendship Stadium	Piraeus	N/A
1986–87	Aris	110–70	Panellinios	Peace and Friendship Stadium	Piraeus	N/A
1987–88	Aris	84–71	AEK	Peace and Friendship Stadium	Piraeus	N/A
1988–89	Aris	91–86	PAOK	Alexandrio Melathron	Thessaloniki	N/A
1989–90	Aris	75–62	PAOK	Peace and Friendship Stadium	Piraeus	N/A
1990–91	Panionios	73–70	PAOK	Peace and Friendship Stadium	Piraeus	N/A
1991–92	Aris	74–62	AEK	Peace and Friendship Stadium	Piraeus	N/A
1992–93	Panathinaikos	96–89	Sato Aris	Peace and Friendship Stadium	Piraeus	N/A
1993–94	Olympiacos	63–51	Stiebel Eltron Iraklis	Peace and Friendship Stadium	Piraeus	N/A
1994–95	PAOK Bravo	72–53	Chipita Panionios	Chalkiopoulio Sports Hall	Lamia	(Federal Republic of Yugoslavia) / (Greece) Bane Prelević
1995–96	Panathinaikos	85–74	Iraklis Aspis Pronoia	Dimitris Tofalos Arena	Patras	(United States) Dominique Wilkins
1996–97	Olympiacos	80–78	Dexim Apollon Patras	O.A.C.A. Olympic Indoor Hall	Marousi, Athens	(United States) David Rivers
1997–98	Aris Moda Bagno	71–68	AEK	Alexandrio Melathron	Thessaloniki	(Greece) Panagiotis Liadelis
1998–99	PAOK	71–54	AEK	Peace and Friendship Stadium	Piraeus	(United States) Walter Berry
1999–00	AEK	59–57	Panathinaikos	PAOK Sports Arena	Pylaia, Thessaloniki	(Federal Republic of Yugoslavia) Željko Rebrača
2000–01	AEK	66–64	Panathinaikos	O.A.C.A. Olympic Indoor Hall	Marousi, Athens	(Turkey) İbrahim Kutluay
2001–02	Olympiacos	74–66	Maroussi Telestet	Peace and Friendship Stadium	Piraeus	(United States) Alphonso Ford
2002–03	Panathinaikos	81–76	Aris	Larissa Neapolis Arena	Larissa	(Greece) Fragiskos Alvertis
2003–04	Aris	73–70	Olympiacos	Chalkiopoulio Sports Hall	Lamia	(Greece) Nestoras Kommatos
2004–05	Panathinaikos	72–68	Aris Egnatia Bank	Lido Indoor Hall	Heraklion	(Slovenia) Jaka Lakovič
2005–06	Panathinaikos	68–57	Maroussi Honda	Galatsi Olympic Hall	Galatsi, Athens	(Greece) Kostas Tsartsaris
2006–07	Panathinaikos	87–48	Rethymno Aegean	O.A.C.A. Olympic Indoor Hall	Maroussi, Athens	(Greece) Kostas Tsartsaris (2)
2007–08	Panathinaikos	81–79	Olympiacos	Hellinikon Olympic Arena	Elliniko, Athens	(Greece) Kostas Tsartsaris (3)
2008–09	Panathinaikos	80–70	Olympiacos	Hellinikon Olympic Arena	Elliniko, Athens	(Greece) Dimitris Diamantidis
2009–10	Olympiacos	68–64	Panathinaikos	Hellinikon Olympic Arena	Elliniko, Athens	(Serbia) Miloš Teodosić
2010–11	Olympiacos	74–68	Panathinaikos	Hellinikon Olympic Arena	Elliniko, Athens	(Serbia) Miloš Teodosić (2)
2011–12	Panathinaikos	71–70	Olympiacos	Hellinikon Olympic Arena	Elliniko, Athens	(Lithuania) Šarūnas Jasikevičius
2012–13	Panathinaikos	81–78	Olympiacos	Hellinikon Olympic Arena	Elliniko, Athens	(Croatia) Roko Ukić
2013–14	Panathinaikos	90–53	Aris	Heraklion Indoor Sports Arena	Heraklion	(United States) Ramel Curry
2014–15	Panathinaikos	68–53	Apollon Patras	O.A.C.A. Olympic Indoor Hall	Maroussi, Athens	(Greece) Loukas Mavrokefalidis
2015–16	Panathinaikos	101–54	Faros Keratsiniou	O.A.C.A. Olympic Indoor Hall	Maroussi, Athens	(Greece) Dimitris Diamantidis (2)
2016–17	Panathinaikos	68–59	Aris	Alexandrio Melathron	Thessaloniki	(Dominican Republic) / (United States) James Feldeine
2017–18	AEK	88–83	Olympiacos	Heraklion Indoor Sports Arena	Heraklion	(United States) Manny Harris
2018–19	Panathinaikos	79–73	PAOK	Heraklion Indoor Sports Arena	Heraklion	(Greece) / (United States) Nick Calathes
2019–20	AEK	61–57	Promitheas	Heraklion Indoor Sports Arena	Heraklion	(Greece) Nikos Zisis
2020–21	Panathinaikos	91–79	Promitheas	O.A.C.A. Olympic Indoor Hall	Maroussi, Athens	(Greece) Ioannis Papapetrou
2021–22	Olympiacos	81–73	Panathinaikos	Heraklion Indoor Sports Arena	Heraklion	(Greece) / (United States) Tyler Dorsey
2022–23	Olympiacos	85–57	Peristeri	Heraklion Indoor Sports Arena	Heraklion	(Bulgaria) / (Greece) Sasha Vezenkov
2023–24	Olympiacos	69–58	Panathinaikos	Heraklion Indoor Sports Arena	Heraklion	(France) Moustapha Fall
2024–25	Panathinaikos	79–75	Olympiacos	Heraklion Indoor Sports Arena	Heraklion	(Greece) Kostas Sloukas
2025–26	Panathinaikos	79–68	Olympiacos	Heraklion Indoor Sports Arena	Heraklion	(United States) Nigel Hayes-Davis

== Titles by club ==
Club	Winners	Runners-up	Years won
Panathinaikos	22	7	1978–79, 1981–82, 1982–83, 1985–86, 1992–93, 1995–96, 2002–03, 2004–05, 2005–06, 2006–07, 2007–08, 2008–09, 2011–12, 2012–13, 2013–14, 2014–15, 2015–16, 2016–17, 2018–19, 2020–21, 2024–25, 2025–26
Olympiacos	12	11	1975–76, 1976–77, 1977–78, 1979–80, 1993–94, 1996–97, 2001–02, 2009–10, 2010–11, 2021–22, 2022–23, 2023–24
Aris	8	6	1984–85, 1986–87, 1987–88, 1988–89, 1989–90, 1991–92, 1997–98, 2003–04
AEK	5	7	1980–81, 1999–2000, 2000–01, 2017–18, 2019–20
PAOK	3	5	1983–84, 1994–95, 1998–99
Panionios	1	2	1990–91
Iraklis	-	3	
Apollon Patras	-	2	
Maroussi	-	2	
Promitheas Patras	-	2	
Panellinios	-	1	
Rethymno	-	1	
Faros Keratsiniou	-	1	
Peristeri	-	1	

== Titles by city ==
6 clubs have won the Greek Basketball Cup. The 6 clubs that have won the Greek Basketball Cup all come from either the Thessaloniki or Athens urban areas, which are the two largest urban areas in the country of Greece.

Urban Area	Clubs	Titles won	City	Club Home Arena
Athens	Panathinaikos (22) AEK (5) Panionios (1)	28	Athens Athens Nea Smyrni	O.A.C.A. Olympic Indoor Hall, Marousi, Athens Nikos Galis Olympic Indoor Hall, Marousi, Athens Nea Smyrni Indoor Hall, Nea Smyrni, Athens
Piraeus	Olympiacos (12)	12	Piraeus	Peace and Friendship Stadium SEF, Piraeus
Thessaloniki	Aris (8) PAOK (3)	11	Thessaloniki Thessaloniki	Alexandreio Melathron Nick Galis Hall, Thessaloniki PAOK Sports Arena, Thessaloniki

== Final Four (1994–2004 & 2021–present) ==
The Final Four system was introduced in the 1994–95 season, and it was used until the 2003–04 season. It was used again in 2021–22 season, but without a 3rd place game.

Season	1st	2nd	3rd	4th
1994–95	PAOK	Panionios	Aris	Ilysiakos
1995–96	Panathinaikos	Iraklis	Apollon Patras	AEK
1996–97	Olympiacos	Apollon Patras	AEK	Panathinaikos
1997–98	Aris	AEK	Olympiacos	Panathinaikos
1998–99	PAOK	AEK	Iraklis	Aris
1999–00	AEK	Panathinaikos	Maroussi	Iraklis
2000–01	AEK	Panathinaikos	Olympiacos	Iraklis
2001–02	Olympiacos	Maroussi	Panathinaikos	Panellinios
2002–03	Panathinaikos	Aris	Makedonikos	Iraklio
2003–04	Aris	Olympiacos	Peristeri	Apollon Patras
2021–22	Olympiacos	Panathinaikos	AEK, Promitheas Patras	
2022–23	Olympiacos	Peristeri bwin	Panathinaikos, AEK	
2023–24	Olympiacos	Panathinaikos	Aris, Promitheas Patras	
2024–25	Panathinaikos	Olympiacos	PAOK, Promitheas Patras	
2025–26	Panathinaikos	Olympiacos	Iraklis, Maroussi	

=== Final 4 performance by club ===
Club	1st	2nd	3rd	4th
Olympiacos	5 (1997, 2002, 2022, 2023, 2024)	2 (2004, 2025)	2 (1998, 2001)	-
Panathinaikos	3 (1996, 2003, 2025)	4 (2000, 2001, 2022, 2024)	1 (2002)	2 (1997, 1998)
AEK	2 (2000, 2001)	2 (1998, 1999)	1 (1997)	1 (1996)
Aris	2 (1998, 2004)	1 (2003)	1 (1995)	1 (1999)
PAOK	2 (1995, 1999)	-	-	-
Iraklis	-	1 (1996)	1 (1999)	2 (2000, 2001)
Apollon Patras	-	1 (1997)	1 (1996)	1 (2004)
Maroussi	-	1 (2002)	1 (2000)	-
Panionios	-	1 (1995)	-	-
Makedonikos	-	-	1 (2003)	-
Peristeri	-	-	1 (2004)	-
Ilysiakos	-	-	-	1 (1995)
Panellinios	-	-	-	1 (2002)
Irakleio	-	-	-	1 (2003)

== Greek Basketball Cup Finals Top Scorers and MVPs ==
Since the first Greek Cup in 1976, the Top Scorer of the Greek Cup Finals is given an award, regardless of whether he plays on the winning or losing team. Since 1995, a Finals MVP is also named at the conclusion of the Finals.

(X)	Denotes the number of multiple times that the player was the Top Scorer or MVP.

Season	Greek Cup Finals Top Scorer	Club	Greek Cup Finals MVP	Club
1975–76	(Greece) / (United States) Georgios Kastrinakis	Olympiacos		
1976–77	(Greece) / (United States) Steve Giatzoglou	Olympiacos		
1977–78	(Greece) / (United States) Steve Giatzoglou (2)	Olympiacos		
1978–79	(Greece) / (United States) Steve Giatzoglou (3)	Olympiacos		
1979–80	(Greece) / (United States) Steve Giatzoglou (4) & (Greece) / (United States) Georgios Kastrinakis (2)	Olympiacos		
1980–81	(Greece) Vassilis Goumas	AEK		
1981–82	(Greece) Vangelis Alexandris	PAOK		
1982–83	(Greece) Takis Koroneos	Panathinaikos		
1983–84	(Greece) Nikos Stavropoulos	PAOK		
1984–85	(Greece) Panagiotis Giannakis	Aris		
1985–86	(Greece) / (United States) David Stergakos	Panathinaikos		
1986–87	(Greece) / (United States) Nikos Galis	Aris		
1987–88	(Greece) Panagiotis Giannakis (2)	Aris		
1988–89	(Greece) / (United States) Nikos Galis (2)	Aris		
1989–90	(Greece) / (United States) Nikos Galis (3)	Aris		
1990–91	(Greece) Georgios Gasparis & (United States) Ken Barlow	Panionios & PAOK		
1991–92	(Greece) / (United States) Nikos Galis (4)	Aris		
1992–93	(Greece) / (United States) Nikos Galis (5)	Panathinaikos		
1993–94	(Federal Republic of Yugoslavia) Žarko Paspalj	Olympiacos		
1994–95	(Federal Republic of Yugoslavia) / (Greece) Bane Prelević	PAOK Bravo	(Federal Republic of Yugoslavia) / (Greece) Bane Prelević	PAOK Bravo
1995–96	(United States) Dominique Wilkins	Panathinaikos	(United States) Dominique Wilkins	Panathinaikos
1996–97	(United States) Harold Ellis	Dexim Apollon Patras	(United States) David Rivers	Olympiacos
1997–98	(Greece) Panagiotis Liadelis	Aris Moda Bagno	(Greece) Panagiotis Liadelis	Aris Moda Bagno
1998–99	(United States) Frankie King	PAOK	(United States) Walter Berry	PAOK
1999–00	(Federal Republic of Yugoslavia) Željko Rebrača	Panathinaikos	(Federal Republic of Yugoslavia) Željko Rebrača	Panathinaikos
2000–01	(Turkey) İbrahim Kutluay	AEK	(Turkey) İbrahim Kutluay	AEK
2001–02	(United States) Alphonso Ford	Olympiacos	(United States) Alphonso Ford	Olympiacos
2002–03	(Greece) Fragiskos Alvertis	Panathinaikos	(Greece) Fragiskos Alvertis	Panathinaikos
2003–04	(United States) Smush Parker	Aris	(Greece) Nestoras Kommatos	Aris
2004–05	(United States) DeJuan Collins	Aris Egnatia Bank	(Slovenia) Jaka Lakovič	Panathinaikos
2005–06	(Bulgaria) / (United States) Roderick Blakney	Maroussi Honda	(Greece) Kostas Tsartsaris	Panathinaikos
2006–07	(Greece) Kostas Tsartsaris	Panathinaikos	(Greece) Kostas Tsartsaris (2)	Panathinaikos
2007–08	(United States) Lynn Greer	Olympiacos	(Greece) Kostas Tsartsaris (3)	Panathinaikos
2008–09	(Greece) Dimitris Diamantidis	Panathinaikos	(Greece) Dimitris Diamantidis	Panathinaikos
2009–10	(Serbia) Miloš Teodosić	Olympiacos	(Serbia) Miloš Teodosić	Olympiacos
2010–11	(Serbia) Miloš Teodosić (2)	Olympiacos	(Serbia) Miloš Teodosić (2)	Olympiacos
2011–12	(Greece) Georgios Printezis	Olympiacos	(Lithuania) Šarūnas Jasikevičius	Panathinaikos
2012–13	(Greece) Dimitris Diamantidis (2)	Panathinaikos	(Croatia) Roko Ukić	Panathinaikos
2013–14	(United States) Ramel Curry	Panathinaikos	(United States) Ramel Curry	Panathinaikos
2014–15	(United States) Toarlyn Fitzpatrick	Apollon Patras	(Greece) Loukas Mavrokefalidis	Panathinaikos
2015–16	(Greece) Gaios Skordilis	Faros Keratsiniou	(Greece) Dimitris Diamantidis (2)	Panathinaikos
2016–17	(United States) Will Cummings	Aris	(Dominican Republic) / (United States) James Feldeine	Panathinaikos
2017–18	(Greece) Vassilis Spanoulis	Olympiacos	(United States) Manny Harris	AEK
2018–19	(United States) Will Hatcher	PAOK	(Greece) / (United States) Nick Calathes	Panathinaikos
2019–20	(United States) Kendrick Ray	AEK	(Greece) Nikos Zisis	AEK
2020–21	(Greece) Ioannis Papapetrou	Panathinaikos	(Greece) Ioannis Papapetrou	Panathinaikos
2021–22	(Bulgaria) / (Greece) Sasha Vezenkov (1)	Olympiacos	(Greece) / (United States) Tyler Dorsey	Olympiacos
2022–23	(Bulgaria) / (Greece) Sasha Vezenkov (2)	Olympiacos	(Bulgaria) / (Greece) Sasha Vezenkov	Olympiacos
2023–24	(Greece) Dinos Mitoglou	Panathinaikos	(France) Moustapha Fall	Olympiacos
2024–25	(Bulgaria) / (Greece) Sasha Vezenkov (3) & (Greece) Kostas Sloukas & (United States) Kendrick Nunn	Olympiacos	(Greece) Kostas Sloukas	Panathinaikos
2025–26	(Bulgaria) / (Greece) Sasha Vezenkov (4)	Olympiacos	(United States) Nigel Hayes-Davis	Panathinaikos

== Topscorers ==
=== Final Four/Eight leading scorers ===
Year	Player	Points Scored	Games	Team
1995	(Socialist Federal Republic of Yugoslavia) / (Greece) Bane Prelevic	56	2	PAOK
1998	(Greece) Panagiotis Liadelis	53	2	Aris B.C.

=== All-time Greek Cup Finals game career scoring leaders ===
- (Through the 2024 Greek Basketball Cup):
- Players that are still active are marked in **bold**.

Rank	Player	Points Scored
1.	(Greece) / (United States) Nikos Galis	246
2.	(Greece) Panagiotis Giannakis	155
3.	(Greece) / (United States) Steve Giatzoglou	144
4.	(Greece) Dimitris Diamantidis	128
5.	(Greece) / (United States) Georgios Kastrinakis	97
6.	(Greece) Vassilis Spanoulis	87
6.	(Greece) / (United States) David Stergakos	87
6.	(United States) Mike Batiste	87
9.	(Greece) Panagiotis Fasoulas	81
10.	(Greece) / (United States) Pavlos Diakoulas	80
11.	(Greece) Minas Gekos	73
12.	(Greece) Kostas Tsartsaris	67
13.	(Federal Republic of Yugoslavia) / (Greece) Bane Prelević	64
14.	(Greece) **Antonis Fotsis**	63
14.	(Greece) Nikos Stavropoulos	63
16.	(Greece) Michalis Giannouzakos	60
17.	(Greece) Fragiskos Alvertis	59
18.	(Greece) Nikos Filippou	56
19.	(Greece) Dimitris Kokolakis	54
20.	(Socialist Federal Republic of Yugoslavia) / (Greece) Lefteris Subotić	53
21.	(Greece) / (United States) **Nick Calathes**	52
22.	(Greece) Takis Koroneos	51
23.	(Greece) Liveris Andritsos	47
24.	(Greece) **Loukas Mavrokefalidis**	46
25.	(Greece) / (United States) John Korfas	45
25.	(Turkey) İbrahim Kutluay	45

== Players that made the most Greek Cup Finals ==
- (Through the 2024 Greek Basketball Cup):
- Players that are still active are marked in **bold**.

Rank	Player	Number of Finals
1.	(Greece) Dimitris Diamantidis	12
2.	(Greece) **Antonis Fotsis**	10
3.	(Greece) Vassilis Spanoulis	9
3.	(United States) Mike Batiste	9
3.	(Greece) Kostas Tsartsaris	9
3.	(Greece) Georgios Printezis	8
7.	(Greece) Panagiotis Giannakis	8
7.	(Greece) / (United States) Nikos Galis	8
7.	(Greece) Fragiskos Alvertis	8
10.	(Greece) **Kostas Papanikolaou**	7
10.	(Greece) Kimon Kokorogiannis	7
10.	(Greece) Panagiotis Fasoulas	7
13.	(Greece) **Michalis Lountzis**	6
13.	(United States) **James Gist**	6
13.	(Greece) Stratos Perperoglou	6
13.	(Federal Republic of Yugoslavia) / (Greece) Bane Prelević	6
13.	(Greece) / (United States) Steve Giatzoglou	6
13.	(Greece) Georgios Doxakis	6
13.	(Greece) / (United States) Georgios Kastrinakis	6
13.	(Greece) Memos Ioannou	6
13.	(Greece) Michalis Romanidis	6
13.	(Greece) Nikos Boudouris	6

== Players with the most Greek Cup titles ==
- (Through the 2024 Greek Basketball Cup):
- Players that are still active are marked in **bold**.

Rank	Player	Greek Cups	Years won
1.	(Greece) Dimitris Diamantidis	10	2005, 2006, 2007, 2008, 2009, 2012, 2013, 2014, 2015, 2016
2.	(Greece) Fragiskos Alvertis	8	1993, 1996, 2003, 2005, 2006, 2007, 2008, 2009
2.	(Greece) Kostas Tsartsaris	8	2003, 2005, 2006, 2007, 2008, 2009, 2012, 2013
4.	(Greece) / (United States) Nikos Galis	7	1985, 1987, 1988, 1989, 1990, 1992, 1993
4.	(Greece) Panagiotis Giannakis	7	1985, 1987, 1988, 1989, 1990, 1992, 1996
4.	(United States) Mike Batiste	7	2005, 2006, 2007, 2008, 2009, 2012, 2014
7.	(Greece) **Michalis Lountzis**	6	2015, 2016, 2017, 2022, 2023, 2024
7.	(Greece) Michalis Romanidis	6	1985, 1987, 1988, 1989, 1990, 1992
7.	(Greece) **Antonis Fotsis**	6	2003, 2009, 2014, 2015, 2016, 2017
7.	(United States) **James Gist**	6	2013, 2014, 2015, 2016, 2017, 2019

== Head coaches with multiple Greek Cup titles ==
- (Through the 2026 Greek Basketball Cup):
- Head coaches that are still active are marked in **bold**.

Head coach	Greek Cups	Years Won
(Federal Republic of Yugoslavia) / (Serbia) **Željko Obradović**	7	2003, 2005, 2006, 2007, 2008, 2009, 2012
(Greece) Giannis Ioannidis	6	1985, 1987, 1988, 1989, 1990, 1994
(Federal Republic of Yugoslavia) / (Serbia) Dušan Ivković	4	1997, 2000, 2001, 2011
(Greece) **Georgios Bartzokas**	3	2022, 2023, 2024
(Greece) Faidon Matthaiou	2	1976, 1984
(Greece) Kostas Mourouzis	2	1977, 1978
(Greece) Kostas Politis	2	1979, 1982
(Greece) Argyris Pedoulakis	2	2013, 2014
(Turkey) **Ergin Ataman**	2	2025, 2026

== All the official finals by decade ==
=== 1970s ===
**Greek Basketball Cup Finals**
**1st Final**
12 July 1976 – Glyfada Indoor Hall

**Olympiacos – AEK** 81–69 (41–26), Referees: Papaharisis – P. Tsolakidis

**Olympiacos** (Matthaiou): Kastrinakis 20, Giatzoglou 19, Diakoulas 18, Melini 11, Barlas 7, Rammos 2, Sismanidis 2, Spanos 2, Garonis, Kokorogiannis.
**AEK** (Mourouzis): Giannouzakos 18, L. Kontos 13, Toskounoglou 10, Kantelis 10, Papadatos 10, Trontzos 6, Nesiadis 2, Nidriotis, Apostolidis, Katerouliotis.
**2nd Final**
15 July 1977 – Panathenaic Stadium

**Olympiacos – Panionios** 103–88 (40–45), Referees: Evangelatos – Rigas

**Olympiacos** (Mourouzis): Giatzoglou 31, Diakoulas 17, Rammos 16, Kastrinakis 12, Barlas 9, Melini 8, Sismanidis 4, Garonis 3, Spanos 3, Kokorogiannis.

**Panionios** (Matthaiou): Rapis 23, Missas 23, Dendrinos 17, Fotinos 9, Papadakis 8, Tsikimis 6, Tsantikos 3, Kosmopoulos, Pavlou, Panagiotopoulos.

**3rd Final**
5 June 1978 – Panathenaic Stadium

**Olympiacos – AEK** 83–72 (39–34), Referees: Alifragis – Papacharisis

**Olympiacos** (Mourouzis): Giatzoglou 28, Kastrinakis 21, Diakoulas 16, Barlas 14, Sismanidis 2, Kokorogiannis 2, Garonis, Spanos, Karelas, Rammos.

**AEK** (Amerikanos): Gekos 19, Trontzos 17, Bogatsiotis 12, Giannouzakos 8, Kanakakis 6, Vafopoulos 4, Karterouliotis 4, V. Fotsis 2, Apostolidis, Nesiadis.
**4th Final**
2 June 1979 – Panathenaic Stadium

**Panathinaikos – Olympiacos** 79–72 (45–46), Referees: Alifragis – Rigas

**Panathinaikos** (Politis): Kontos 21, Papantoniou 16, Kokolakis 15, Koroneos 12, Stergakos 11, Batis 4, Papazoglou, Garos, Sigas, Ioannou.

**Olympiacos** (Mourouzis): Giatzoglou 28, Diakoulas 15, Kastrinakis 13, Melini 8, Raftopoulos 6, Sismanidis, Kokorogiannis, Barlas, Spanos, Sampanis.

=== 1980s ===
**Greek Basketball Cup Finals**
**5th Final**
16 July 1980 – Panathenaic Stadium

**Olympiacos – AEK** 85–80 (44–42), Referees: Apostolidis – Rigas

**Olympiacos** (Barlas): Giatzoglou 25, Kastrinakis 20, Iordanidis 15, Diakoulas 14, Melini 8, Raftopoulos 2, Rammos 2, Kokorogiannis, Spanos.

**AEK** (Trontzos): Giannouzakos 21, Stamelos 18, Gekos 18, Goumas 9, Kanakakis 9, V. Fotsis 5, A. Koroneos, Pantazis, Nesiadis, Tsoskounoglou.

**6th Final**
17 July 1981 – Glyfada Indoor Hall

**AEK – Iraklis** 84–78 (44–31), Referees: Dimou – Papanikolaou

**AEK** (Devely): Goumas 30, Gekos 17, Kanakakis 12, Rambidis (Rambis) 11, Giannopoulos 10, V. Fotsis 4, Apostolidis, Velengas, Margaritis, Koroneos.

**Iraklis** (Kioumourtzoglou): Karatzoulidis 29, Tzamos 13, Pasioudus 11, Agrafiotis 8, Douvis 8, Tsoumis 5, Mantis 4, Nalbantis, Tsombanakis, Mouratidis.

**7th Final**
30 June 1982 – Alexandreio Melathron

**Panathinaikos – PAOK** 65–63 (25–35), Referees: Alifragis- Lortos

**Panathinaikos** (Politis): Stergakos 21, Kokolakis 13, Vidas 12, Koroneos 10, Kontos 7, Ioannou 2, Papantoniou, (Batis, Georganas, Katsinis).

**PAOK** (Rodopoulos): Alexandris 22, Fasoulas 11, Konstantinidis 10, Gaitanis 9, Μ. Katsoulis 6, Kalpakis 5, Koumatsiotis, Bourlidas, Ζ. Katsoulis, (Tsakogiannis).

**8th Final**
20 April 1983 – Glyfada Indoor Hall

**Panathinaikos – Olympiacos** 72–62, Referees: Rigas – Koumbouris

**Panathinaikos** (Kefalos): Koroneos 19, Stergakos 13, Andritsos 12, Kokolakis 11, Kappos 9, Ioannou 8, Kalogeropoulos, Karanasos, Lykoudis.

**Olympiacos** (Barlas): Giatzoglou 14, Paragios 10, Kastrinakis 9, Skropolithas 8, Kassimis 6, Raftopoulos 6, Kokorogiannis 5, Kozakis 4, Kambouris, Sampanis.

**9th Final**
18 April 1984 – Alexandreio Melathron

**PAOK – Aris** 74–70 (45–29), Referees: Ioannou-Panatazis

**PAOK** (Matthaiou): Stavropoulos 26, Μ. Katsoulis 12, Fasoulas 12, Politis 8, Bakopoulos 8, Alexandris 6, Z. Katsoulis 2, Angelidis, Konstantinidis, Polychronakos.

**Aris** (Ioannidis): Filippou 22, Galis 20, Nikitas 13, Kokolakis 9, Tsachtanis 4, Romanidis 2, Paramanidis, Doxakis, Stamatis, Georgiadis.

**10th Final**
9 May 1985 – Peace and Friendship Stadium

**Aris – Panathinaikos** 86–70 (42–23), Referees: P. Tsolakidis – Koumbouris

**Aris** (Ioannidis): Giannakis 37 (8), Galis 33 (1), Filippou 8, Romanidis 2, Christofakis, Kokolakis, Paramanidis, Doxakis, Stamatis, Tsitakis.

**Panathinaikos** (Kyritsis): Stergakos 17 (3), Vidas 17, Andritsos 13, Koroneos 10 (1), Skropolithas 7, Papapetrou 4, Ioannou 2, Vasilantonakis, Mathaeakakis, Karanasos.

**11th Final**
23 April 1986 – Peace and Friendship Stadium

**Panathinaikos – Olympiacos** 88–78 (42–42,) Referees: Rigas – Stavrou

**Panathinaikos** (Kyritsis): Stergakos 25, Andritsos 22, Papapetrou 16, Ioannou 13 (1), Skropolithas 11 (1), Vidas 1, Petroudakis, Konstantos, Fragiskatos.

**Olympiacos** (Anastasatos): Al. Christodoulou 17 (2), Panagiotopoulos 13, Kambouris 12, Maniatis 11, Paragios 8, Sampanis 7 (1), Kozakis 6, Koukis 2, Nalbantis 2, Dakoulas.

**12th Final**
15 April 1987 – Peace and Friendship Stadium

**Aris – Panellinios** 110–70 (49–38), Referees: Tsagamilis – Lortos

**Aris** (Ioannidis): Galis 52, Romanidis 18 (2), Giannakis 14 (4), Filippou 12, Stamatis 4, Papageorgiou 4, Doxakis 4, Lipiridis 2, Tsitakis, Kasmeridis.

**Panellinios** (Pavlou): Malach 23, Giannopoulos 21 (4), Dakouris 10, Papandraklakis 6, Katsimpas 5, A. Stamatis 3 (1), Tsekos 2, Kokorogiannis, Zafeiropoulos, Tsapralis.

**13th Final**
18 May 1988 – Peace and Friendship Stadium

**Aris – AEK** 84–71 (42–39), Referees: Douvis – Symeonidis

**Aris** (Ioannidis): Giannakis 35 (5), Galis 14, Subotić 14 (4), Filippou 12, Misunov 4, Romanidis 3 (1), Doxakis 2, Daliaris, Lipiridis, Karamanolis.

**AEK** (Nikitopoulos): Aridas 20, Gekos 18 (2), Giannopoulos 11, Patavoukas 9 (1), Agiasotelis 6, Skourtopoulos 2, V. Fotsis 2, Michelidakis, Sakelariou, Katsigiannis.

**14th Final**
13 May 1989 – Alexandreio Melathron

**Aris – PAOK** 91–86 (49–56), Referees: Kontis – Vidalis

**Aris** (Ioannidis): Galis 35, Wiltjer 17, Giannakis 15 (3), Subotić 13 (3), Romanidis 6 (1), Misunov 2, Filippou 3, Μ.Katsoulis, Doxakis, Daliaris.

**PAOK** (Politis): M. Jones 29 (1), Korfas 18 (2), Stavropoulos 12 (2), Prelević 10, Fasoulas 7, Makaras 3 (1), Melis 1, Karatzoulidis 2, Bakopoulos, Dotsios.

=== 1990s ===
**Greek Basketball Cup Finals**
**15th Final**
21 May 1990 – Peace and Friendship Stadium

**Aris – PAOK** 72–62 (33–31) Referees: Rigas – Koromilas

**Aris** (Ioannidis): Galis 35 (1), Subotić 20 (3), Giannakis 9, Misunov 7, Vranković 4, Lipiridis, Romanidis, Vourtzoumis, Μ. Katsoulis, Doxakis.

**PAOK** (Politis): Stavropoulos 17 (1), Cook 14 (1), Fasoulas 8, Prelević 8, Makaras 7 (1), Korfas 6, Boudouris 1, Papachronis 1, Papasarantou, Karatzoulidis.

**16th Final**
11 April 1991 – Peace and Friendship Stadium

**Panionios – PAOK** 73–70 (34–35), Referees: Douvis – Giohalis

**Panionios** (Đurović): F. Christodoulou 21 (2), Gasparis 20 (2), Hudson 12, Brougos 12, Ch. Christodoulou, Bosganas, Panagopoulos, Chougkaz, Balis, Balas.

**PAOK** (Šakota): Barlow 20 (2), Prelević 19 (1), Korfas 16 (1), Fasoulas 7, Stavropoulos 5 (1), Makaras 3, Papachronis, Ioannou, Boudouris, Katsikis.

**17th Final**
13 May 1992 – Peace and Friendship Stadium

**Aris – AEK** 75–62 (42–28), Referees: Manos-Mbakalis

**Aris** (Ioannou): Galis 18 (1), Misunov 17, Giannakis 14 (1), E. Jones 9, Lipiridis 7 (1), Pecarski 4, Subotić 3 (1), Vourtzoumis 2, Angelidis, Baltatzis.

**AEK** (Nikitopoulos): Galakteros 13 (1), Katsikaris 11 (3), Patavoukas 10 (1), Jordan 10, Lanes 9, Kountourakis 4, Papasarantou 3, Aridas 2, Pioukas, Blakley.

**18th Final**
15 May 1993 – Peace and Friendship Stadium

**Panathinaikos – Sato Aris** 96–89 (48–43), Referees: Ralis-Tsanidis

**Panathinaikos** (Pavličević): Galis 36, Komazec 30 (4), Vranković 7, Oikonomou 6, Alvertis 6 (1), Giannopoulos 5 (1), Papapetrou 2, Georgikopoulos 2, Myriounis 2, Gekos.

**Sato Aris** (Sherf): Giannakis 30 (3), Anderson 23 (2), Pecarski 11, Theus 9, Vourtzoumis 5 (1), Ioannou 5, Subotić 3 (1), Gasparis 2, Lipiridis 1, Misunov.

**19th Final**
1994 – Peace and Friendship Stadium

**Olympiacos – Stiebel Eltron Iraklis** 63–51 (26–22), Referees: Pitsilkas-Voreadis

**Olympiacos** (Ioannidis): Paspalj 17, Fasoulas 15 (1), Nakić 9, Tomić 7, Bakatsias 7 (1), Tarpley 4, Sigalas 2, Tarlać 2, Stamatis, Kambouris.

**Stiebel Eltron Iraklis** (Šakota): Kouvelas 11, Zdovc 10 (1), Donaldson 8, Cholopoulos 6, Kakiousis 6, Tambakis 5, Stavropoulos 3 (1), Panagiotidis 2, Asteriadis, Chatzopoulos.

**20th Final** (Final Four)
4–5 March 1995 – Chalkiopoulio

Semifinals: PAOK Bravo – Aris 80–63, Chipita Panionios – Ilysiakos 77–50,

Third place: Aris – Ilysiakos 99–64,

Final: **PAOK Bravo – Chipita Panionios** 72–53 (37–30), Referees: Ralis – Koukoulekidis

**PAOK Bravo** (Laios): Prelević 27 (4), Savić 21, Bullard 6, Korfas 5 (1), Mamatziolas 3 (1), Giannoulis 3, Galakteros 2, Rentzias 2, Balogiannis, Boudouris.

**Chipita Panionios** (Ivković): Mays 16, Bailey 12, Karagoutis 9, Angelou 6 (2), Christodoulou 5, Jelić 5, Bosganas, Kalaitzis, Kikilias, Koutsopoulos.

**21st Final** (Final Four)
23–24 March 1996 – Patras Arena

Semifinals: Apollon Patras – Iraklis 77–79, Panathinaikos – AEK 87–78,

Third place: Apollon Patras – AEK 86–82,

Final: **Panathinaikos – Iraklis Aspis Pronoia** 85–74 (47–27), Referees: Symeonidis – Tsoulis

**Panathinaikos** (Maljković): Wilkins 25 (1), Oikonomou 23 (3), Vranković 13, Giannopoulos 11 (1), Alvertis 5, Kuusmaa 5 (1), Giannakis 3, Korfas, Stavrakopoulos, Pecarski.

**Iraklis Aspis Pronoia** (Giatzoglou): McDaniel 23 (2), Tarpley 21, Giannouzakos 14 (2), Kakiousis 10, Brougos 6, Angelou, Asteriadis, Kountourakis, Moraitis, Kouvelas.

**22nd Final** (Final Four)
12–13 April 1997 – OAKA

Semifinals: Olympiacos – AEK 66–63, Apollon Patras – Panathinaikos 92–79,

Third place: AEK – Panathinaikos 72–63,

Final: **Olympiacos – Dexim Apollon Patras** 80–78 (42–37), Referees: Tsanidis – Mouzakis

**Olympiacos** (Ivković): Fasoulas 21, Tarlać 10, Rivers 14 (1), Papanikolaou 6, Gray 6, Tomić 8, Welp 5, Nakić 4 (1), Bakatsias 3, Sigalas 3 (1).

**Dexim Apollon Patras** (Alexandris): Ellis 24, Myriounis 20, Vukčević 19 (2), Molfetas 7, Vetoulas 3 (1), Chatzopoulos 3 (1), Raily 2, Nemanja, Aryropoulos, Tambakis.

**23rd Final** (Final Four)
31 January – 1 February 1998 – Alexandreio Melathron

Semifinals: Olympiacos – AEK 49–63, Panathinaikos – Aris 68–88,

Third place: Panathinaikos – Olympiacos 56–80,

Τελικός: **Aris Moda Bagno – AEK** 71–68, Referees: Koukoulekidis – Zavlanos

**Aris Moda Bagno** (Magotsios): Liadelis 22 (1), Sioutis 15 (2), Paspalj 12, Boni 8, Angelidis 5 (1), Galakteros 3 (1), Nahar 3, Chrysanthopoulos 3 (1), Floros, Ordman.

**AEK** (Ioannidis): Anderson 18, Chatzis 14 (2), Lassa 13 (2), Alexander 11, Tsakalidis 6, Kakiouzis 4, Coldebella 2, Prelević, Larsen, Andersen.

**24th Final** (Final Four)
30–31 January 1999 – Peace and Friendship Stadium

Semifinals: PAOK – Aris 83–50, Iraklis – AEK 59–63,

Third place: Aris – Iraklis 61–70,

Final: **PAOK – AEK** 71–54, Referees: Pitsilkas – Koromilas

**PAOK** (Flevarakis): King 21, Berry 19, Balogiannis 16 (4), Giannoulis 6, Coldebella 5, Morales 2, S. Nikolaidis 2, Maslarinos, Kakiousis, Despos, Christou, Peral.

**AEK** (Politis): Arlauckas 18, Daniels 12 (2), Tsakalidis 7, Chatzis 5 (1), Kakiouzis 3, Papanikopoulos 3 (1), Koronios 2, Prelević 2, Andersen 2, Dikoudis, Papadopoulos.

=== 2000s ===
**Greek Basketball Cup Finals**
**25th Final** (Final Four)
8–9 April 2000 – PAOK Arena

Semifinals: AEK – Maroussi 77–63, Iraklis – Panathinaikos 59–70,

Third place: Maroussi – Iraklis 81–71,

Final: **AEK – Panathinaikos** 59–57 (34–25), Referees: Koromilas – Koukoulekidis

**AEK** (Ivković): Koronios 12 (2), Tsakalidis 12, Kakiouzis 10 (1), Müürsepp 9 (1), Bowie 8 (1), Dikoudis 4, Hansell 2, Chatzis 2, Misiakos, Papanikolopoulos, Osalivan.

**Panathinaikos** (Obradović): Rebrača 18, Kattash 12, Bodiroga 11, Rogers 5 (1), Burke 4, Boudouris 3 (1), Alvertis 2, Kalaitzis 2, Fotsis, Gentile, Koch, Glyniadakis.

**26th Final** (Final Four)
28–29 April 2001 – ΟΑΚΑ

Semifinals: Iraklis – AEK 59–87, Olympiacos – Panathinaikos 69–79,

Third place: Iraklis – Olympiacos 70–91,

Final: **ΑΕΚ – Panathinaikos** 66–64, Referees: Pitsilkas – Voreadis

**AEK** (Ivković): Kutluay 22 (3), Stefanov 20 (3), Betts 9, Dikoudis 6, Kakiouzis 5, Müürsepp 2, Hammink 2, Panteliadis, Kikilias, Chatzis, Zisis, Misiakos.

**Panathinaikos** (Obradović): Bodiroga 20, Rebrača 12, Alvertis 11 (1), Fotsis 5, Kalaitzis 5, Middleton 4, Balogiannis 3 (1), Gentile 2, Koch 1, Rogers, Burke, Rodostoglou.

**27th Final** (Final Four)
5–7 April 2002 – Peace and Friendship Stadium

Semifinals: Panellinios – Maroussi 70–77, Olympiacos – Panathinaikos 83–75,

Third place: Panathinaikos – Panellinios 81–71,

Final: **Olympiacos – Maroussi Telestet** 74–66, Referees: Mastraftzis – Karousis

**Olympiacos** (Subotić): Ford 24, Papaloukas 11, Tomić 8 (2), Savrasenko 8, De Miguel 8, Risacher 6, Forrest 4, Boudouris 3, Femerling 2, Papanikolaou.

**Maroussi Telestet** (Petropoulos): Koch 19 (5), Koronios 11 (3), Burke 11, Conlon 11, Oliver 7 (1), Spanoulis 3 (1), Manolopoulos 3, Marmarinos 1, Falekas, Maslarinos, Pavlidis, Tsiakos.

**28th Final** (Final Four)
5–6 April 2003 – Larissa Neapolis Arena

Semifinals: Panathinaikos – Irakleio 94–83, Aris – Makedonikos 92–86,

Third place: Makedonikos – Irakleio 77–71,

Final: **Panathinaikos – Aris** 81–76, Referees: Voreadis – Spyridonos

**Panathinaikos** (Obradović): Alvertis 22 (3), Kutluay 20 (3), Lakovič 14 (1), Middleton 10, Fotsis 9, Papadopoulos 6, Balogiannis, Tsartsaris, McDonald, Kalaitzis, Vidalis.

**Aris** (Alexandris): Gregov 15 (3), Stack 12, Grgat 12, P. Nikolaidis 11 (1), Lappas 9 (1), Solomon 8 (1), Licholitov 5, Raičević 4, Charitopoulos, Gagaloudis, Angelov, Merachtzakis.

**29th Final** (Final Four)
27–29 March 2004 – Chalkiopoulio

Semifinals: Olympiacos – Peristeri 69–67, Apollon Patras – Aris 72–93,

Third place: Peristeri – Apollon Patras 94–73,

Final: **Aris – Olympiacos** 73–70, Referees: Mastraftsis – Karousis

**Aris** (Burton): Parker 21 (3), Licholitov 13, Bailey 12 (2), Stack 12, Kommatos 11, Vetoulas 2, Raičević 2, Lappas, Krytsis, Nikkilä.

**Olympiacos** (Šakota): Charissis 13 (1), Diamantopoulos 11 (1), Jurak 10, Tomić 9 (1), Bagarić 7, Wolkowyski 6, Liadelis 6, Sklavos 4, Gorenc 4, Giannouzakos, Charambopoulos, Printezis.

**30th Final**
19 February 2005 – Lido Indoor Hall

**Panathinaikos – Aris Egnatia Bank** 72–68 (29–38), Referees: Koromilas – Voreadis – Tavoylareas

**Panathinaikos** (Obradović): Lakovič 15 (2), Tsartsaris 14, Batiste 12, Šćepanović 9 (2), Alvertis 8 (2), Diamantidis 6, Femerling 4, Kutluay 3 (1), Kalaitzis 1, Chatzivrettas, Papanikolaou, Baxter.

**Aris Egnatia Bank** (Burton): Collins 21 (4), Castle 11 (1), Padius 9 (1), Schortsanitis 8, Meseriakov 6, Stack 6, Asimokopoulos 3, Johnson 2, Raičević 1, Kyritsis 1, Karapostolou, Charitopoulos.

**31st Final**
18 March 2006 – Galatsi Olympic Hall

**Panathinaikos – Maroussi Honda** 68–57 (28–31), Referees: Pitsilkas – Zavlanos – Papadimitriou

**Panathinaikos** (Obradović): Tsartsaris 16 (2), Lakovič 13 (2), Batiste 10, Spanoulis 7, Diamantidis 5, Tomašević 9, Šćepanović 6 (2), Chatzivrettas 2, Alvertis, Papanikolaou, Femerling, Šakota.

**Maroussi Honda** (Giannakis): Blakney 22 (5), Kyritsis 12, Homan 9, Sekulić 5 (1), Nikolaidis 3 (1), Stefanidis 3 (1), Karagoutis 2, Kaimakoglou 1, Boudouris, Kolokas, Giannoulakos, Noeas.

**32nd Final**
25 March 2007 – OAKA

**Panathinaikos – Rethymno Aegean** 87–48 (44–27), Referees: Koukoulekidis – Bitis – Dinos

**Panathinaikos** (Obradović): Tsartsaris 14 (1), Diamantidis 11 (2), Bečirovič 11 (1), Šiškauskas 9 (1), Batiste 8, Tomašević 6, Dikoudis 6, Chatzivrettas 5, Alvertis 5 (1), Vujanić 5 (1), Javtokas 5, Šakota 2.

**Rethymno Aegean** (Koufos): Kyriakopoulos 8 (2), Liatsos 8 (1), Spanos 7 (2), Tsirigotakis 7 (1), Panaras 6, Koumoulos 5 (1), Koronidis 5 (1), Houliaras 2, Kostis, Vardavas, Solomonidis, Mladenovic.

**33rd Final**
26 March 2008 – Helliniko Olympic Arena

**Panathinaikos – Olympiacos** 81–79 (34–30), Referees: Koukoulekidis – Voreadis –

**Panathinaikos** (Obradović): Spanoulis 20 (4), Tsartsaris 14 (3), Winston 11 (2), Diamantidis 9 (1), Jasikevičius 8 (1), Perperoglou 8 (2), Chatzivrettas 6 (2), Batiste 5, Alvertis, Dikoudis, Žižić, Prkačin.

**Olympiacos** (Giannakis): Greer 28 (4), Vasilopoulos 15 (3), Bourousis 11, Jackson 10, Teodosić 8 (1), Macijauskas 5 (1), Blakney 4, Vasileiadis, Printezis, Tsakalidis, Papamakarios, Kafkis.

**34th Final**
22 February 2009 – Helliniko Olympic Arena

**Panathinaikos – Olympiacos** 80–70 (32–30), Quarters: 16–13, 32–30, 53–53, 80–70, Referees: Voreadis – Zavlanos – I. Koromilas

**Panathinaikos** (Obradović): Diamantidis 16, Fotsis 13, Batiste 12, Jasikevičius 10, Spanoulis 9, Perperoglou 9, Nicholas 6, Peković 5, Tsartsaris, Chatzivrettas.

**Olympiacos** (Giannakis): Papaloukas 13, Greer 11, Bourousis 10, Printezis 9, Vasilopoulos 8, Pargo 7, Pelekanos, Vujčić 4, Halperin 3, Schortsanitis 3, Erceg 2, Milošević.

=== 2010s ===
**Greek Basketball Cup Finals**
**35th Final**
20 February 2010 – Helliniko Olympic Arena

**Olympiacos – Panathinaikos** 68–64 (37–31), Quarters: 15–18, 37–31, 50–42, 68–64. Referees: Voreadis, Mouzakis, Gontas

**Olympiacos** (Giannakis): Teodosić 22, Kleiza 12, Bourousis 8, Childress 7, Penn 7, Vujčić 4, Papaloukas 3, Schortsanitis 3, Mavrokefalidis 2, Halperin, Vasilopoulos.

**Panathinaikos** (Obradović): Diamantidis 12, Peković 12, Batiste 10, Nicholas 10, Haislip 6, Perperoglou 6, Spanoulis 4, Fotsis 2, Jasikevičius 2, Tepić.

**36th Final**
15 May 2011 – Helliniko Olympic Arena

**Olympiacos – Panathinaikos** 74–68 (37–39), Quarters: 22–17, 37–39, 58–53, 74–68. Referees: Christodoulou, Anastopoulos, Koromilas

**Olympiacos** (Ivković): Teodosić 18, Mavrokefalidis 16, Bourousis 13, Halperin 9, Papanikolaou 8, Kešelj 4, Glyniadakis 2, Gordon 2, Erceg 2, Papaloukas, Printezis, (Spanoulis).

**Panathinaikos** (Obradović): Diamantidis 17, Batiste 17, Fotsis 8, Sato 7, Kaimakoglou 6, Perperoglou 5, Tsartsaris 4, Tepić 2, Calathes 2, Nicholas, Vougioukas, Marić.

**37th Final**
10 March 2012 – Helliniko Olympic Arena

**Panathinaikos – Olympiacos** 71–70 (38–35), Quarters: 25–17, 38–35, 55–58, 71–70. Referees: Christodoulou, Anastopoulos, Koromilas

**Panathinaikos** (Obradović): Jasikevičius 10, Sato 10, Diamantidis 9, Batiste 9, Kaimakoglou 8, N. Calathes 7, Vougioukas 7, Marić 6, Tsartsaris 5, Perperoglou, Smith, Logan.

**Olympiacos** (Ivković): Printezis 17, Antić 13, Spanoulis 12, Hines 11, Kešelj 7, Sloukas 4, Mantzaris 2, Dorsey 2, Gecevičius 2, Papanikolaou.

**38th Final**
10 February 2013 – Helliniko Olympic Arena

**Panathinaikos – Olympiacos** 81–78 (40–31), Quarters: 23–15, 40–31, 62–53, 81–78. Referees: Anastopoulos, Schinas, Gontas

**Panathinaikos** (Pedoulakis): Diamantidis 19, Ukić 18, Lasme 16, Gist 11, Kapono 8, Schortsanitis 6, Mačiulis 3, Tsartsaris, Bramos, Banks, Skordilis, Xanthopoulos.

**Olympiacos** (Bartzokas): Antić 17, Law 15, Spanoulis 12, Sloukas 10, Hines 8, Printezis 6, Shermadini 4, Perperoglou 2, Powell 2, Papanikolaou 2, Gecevičius, Katsivelis.

**39th Final**
9 February 2014 – Dyo Aorakia Indoor Hall

**Panathinaikos – Aris** 90–53 (40–40), Quarters: 20–18, 40–40, 75–47, 90–53. Referees: Tanatzis, Karakatsounis, Panagiotou

**Panathinaikos** (Pedoulakis): Curry 17, Mačiulis 13, Fotsis 11, Bramos 8, Diamantidis 7, Lasme 7, Pappas 7, Janković 6, Ukić 6, Batiste 4, Mavrokefalidis 4, Charalampopoulos.

**Aris** (Minić): Bochoridis 12, Athinaiou 10, Pelekanos 9, Vezenkov 9, Tsakaleris 7, Mourtos 5, Gikas 1, Hunt, Asimakopoulos, Charissis, Larentzakis.

**40th Final**
5 April 2015 – OAKA

**Panathinaikos – Apollon Patras** 68–53 (39–20), Quarters: 21–12, 39–20, 57–31, 68–53. Referees: Somos, Tavoulari, Mitsopoulos

**Panathinaikos** (Ivanović): Mavrokefalidis 13, Diamantidis 9, Pappas 9, Batista 9, Fotsis 6, Gist 6, Janković 4, Slaughter 3, Bochoridis 3, Diamantakos 3, Charalampopoulos 3, Lountzis.

**Apollon Patras** (Vetoulas): Fitzpatrick 19, Argyropoulos 9, Niforas 7, Skordilis 5, Penn 5, El Amin 4, Batis 2, Pelekoudas 2, Galloway, Molfetas, Georgallis, Ojo.

**41st Final**
6 March 2016 – OAKA

**Panathinaikos – Faros Keratsiniou** 101–54 (57–26), Quarters: 31–12, 57–26, 76–38, 101–54. Referees: Piloidis, Anastopoulos II., Pantelidis

**Panathinaikos** (Djordjević): Haynes 8, Charalampopoulos 6, Bochoridis 9, Janković 13, Fotsis 4, Raduljica 3, Feldeine 11, Diamantidis 8, Gist 13, Calathes 9, Papagiannis 12, Kuzmić 5.

**Faros Keratsiniou** (Polemis): Papadopoulos 2, Kountouras, Karampoulas 11, Batis 2, Petrodimopoulos 4, Liakopoulos 4, Angelopoulos 7, Kompodietas 3, Katoufas 2, Kakiouzis, Papamakarios 5, Skordilis 14.

**42nd Final**
18 February 2017 – Alexandreio Melathron Nick Galis Hall

**Panathinaikos – Aris** 68–59 (29–27), Quarters: 18–10, 29–27, 50–37, 68–59. Referees: Schinas, Anastopoulos, Panagiotou

**Panathinaikos** (Pascual): Singleton 9, Feldeine 18, Charalampopoulos, Gabriel 3, Calathes 15, Rivers 5, James 9, Pappas, Fotsis 5, Gentile 4, Bourousis, Bochoridis

**Aris** (Priftis): Jenkins 12, Cummings 20, Janković 2, Kavvadas 6, Dragićević 2, Jackson 2, Xanthopoulos, Tsairelis 9, Zaras, Mourtos 2, Symtsak 4, Gordon

**43rd Final**
17 February 2018 – Heraklion Indoor Sports Arena

**Olympiacos – AEK** 83–88 (42–45), Quarters: 23–26, 42–45, 63–65, 83–88. Referees: Schinas, Manos, Poursanidis

**Olympiacos** (Sfairopoulos): McLean 10, Papapetrou 5, Spanoulis 20, Milutinov 17, Strēlnieks 14, Printezis 10, Papanikolaou 4, Mantzaris 3, Roberts, Bogris, Wiltjer, Thompson

**AEK** (Šakota): Punter 14, James 11, Green 6, Harris 17, Xanthopoulos 3, Šakota 8, Vasilopoulos, Atić, Larentzakis 6, Mavroeidis 4, Kavvadas 4, Hunter 15

**44th Final**
17 February 2019 – Heraklion Indoor Sports Arena

**Panathinaikos – PAOK** 79–73 (46–36), Quarters: 29–15, 46–36, 59–58, 79–73. Referees: Papapetrou, Karakatsounis, Tsarouchas

**Panathinaikos** (Pitino): Calathes 19, Langford 17, Gist 14, Thomas 12, Papapetrou 10, Antetokounmpo 5, Mitoglou 2, Payne, Kilpatrick, Lekavičius, Vougioukas, Papagiannis

**PAOK** (Papatheodorou): Hatcher 23, Goss 15, Margaritis 13, Garrett 10, Jones 9, Zaras 3, Jefferson, Tepić, Chrysikopoulos, Koniaris, Tsochlas, Schizas

=== 2020s ===
**Greek Basketball Cup Finals**
**45th Final**
16 February 2020 – Heraklion Indoor Sports Arena

**AEK – Promitheas Patras** 61–57 (29–26), Quarters: 12–13, 29–26, 43–38, 61–57. Referees: Schinas, Anastopoulos, Karakatsounis

**AEK** (Papatheodorou): Ray 16, Zisis 11, Mačiulis 9, Giannopoulos 6, Slaughter 5, Janković 4, Toliopoulos 3, Chalmers 3, Chrysikopoulos 2, Grant 2, Rogkavopoulos, Mavroeidis.

**Promitheas Patras** (Giatras): Kaselakis 15, Mavrokefalidis 11, Hall 9, Babb 8, Lypovyy 7, Mantzaris 3, Agravanis 2, Fieler 2, Katsivelis, Jones, Bell, Mantzoukas.

**46th Final**
9 May 2021 – O.A.C.A. Olympic Indoor Hall

**Panathinaikos – Promitheas Patras** 91–79 (45–41), Quarters: 20–15, 45–41, 68–58, 91–79. Referees: Anastopoulos, Koromilas, Manos

**Panathinaikos** (Kattash): Mack, Papagiannis 6, Bochoridis, Papapetrou 25, Hezonja 18, Diplaros, Kaselakis, White 6, Mitoglou 17, Bentil 3, Sant-Roos 16.

**Promitheas Patras** (Giatras): Agbelese 2, Jerai Grant 18, Clavell 23, Lountzis 9, Agravanis D. 5, Agravanis G. 5, Ford, Christodoulou, Jerian Grant 17, Giannopoulos, Bazinas, Tanoulis.

**47th Final** (Final Four)
18–20 February 2022 – Heraklion Indoor Sports Arena

Semifinals: Olympiacos – AEK 76–70, Promitheas Patras – Panathinaikos 68–85,

Final: **Olympiacos – Panathinaikos** 81–73 (39–45), Quarters: 21–17, 39–45, 58–67, 81–73. Referees: Foufis, Koromilas, Tsaroucha

**Olympiacos** (Bartzokas): Dorsey 21, Vezenkov 18, Sloukas 10, McKissic 9, Walkup 8, Fall 7, Martin 4, Papanikolaou 2, Jean-Charles 2, Larentzakis, Printezis, Acy.

**Panathinaikos** (Priftis): Nedović 23, White 15, Macon 10, Papagiannis 10, Evans 6, Kaselakis 4, Sant-Roos 3, Bochoridis 2, Jović, Kavvadas, Mantzoukas, Chougkaz.

== See also ==
- Greek Basketball League
- Greek A2 Basket League
- HEBA Greek All-Star Game
- Hellenic Basketball Federation
- Hellenic Basketball Association
