= Michail Misunov =

Russian basketball player (born 1964)

Michail Misunov Μιχάλης Μισούνοφ
Personal information
- Born: 27 May 1964 (age 62) Moscow, Soviet Union
- Listed height: 2.08 m (6 ft 10 in)

Career information
- Playing career: 1986–2001
- Position: Power forward
- Number: 8, 14

Career history
- 1986–1987: Šibenka
- 1988–1997: Aris
- 1997–1998: Iraklis
- 1998–1999: Siena
- 1999–2001: Nikol Fert

Career highlights
- European Cup champion (1993); 4× Greek League champion (1988–1991); 4× Greek Cup champion (1988–1990, 1992); Macedonian League champion (2000)

Michail Misunov (alternate spelling: Misounof) (Russian: Михаил Мисунов, Greek: Μιχάλης Μισούνοφ (Michalis Misunov); born 27 May 1964) is a retired Russian professional basketball player with descent from North Macedonia and Greece. Born in Moscow, Misunov started his professional career with KK Šibenka. Subsequently, he moved to the Greek team Aris, with whom he won several national domestic and international trophies. He also played for Iraklis, Siena, and Gostivar.

== Early life ==
He was born in Moscow to a Russian father and a Slavophone Greek mother from Florina, Greece.

== Professional career ==
Misunov started his career in Šibenik with Šibenka's basketball club, and he played in Aris in the period of 1987–1997. With Aris, he won Greek League 4 championships (1988, 1989, 1990, 1991), and 4 Greek Cups (1988, 1989, 1990, 1992). In 1993, he also won the 2nd-tier European Cup. He also played with Iraklis, Siena, and Gostivar.
