= Basketball at the 1979 Mediterranean Games =

- Dates: 23 – 28 September 1979

The basketball tournament at the 1979 Mediterranean Games was held in Split, Croatia, Yugoslavia.

== Medalists ==
Event	Gold	Silver	Bronze
Men's Competition	Greece	Yugoslavia	Egypt

== Group matches ==
	Team	Points	G	W	D	L	GF	GA	Diff
1.	Greece	10	5	5	0	0	477	341	+136
2.	Yugoslavia	8	5	4	0	1	529	329	+200
3.	Egypt	6	5	3	0	2	424	445	−21
4.	Turkey	4	5	2	0	3	470	389	+81
5.	Tunisia	2	5	1	0	4	350	540	−190
6.	Morocco	0	5	0	0	5	325	531	−206

- September 23, 1979

Yugoslavia	89 – 68	Turkey
Morocco	61 – 105	Greece
Tunisia	75 – 109	Egypt

- September 24, 1979

Greece	96 – 56	Tunisia
Turkey	76 – 77	Egypt
Yugoslavia	119 – 58	Morocco

- September 25, 1979

Egypt	77 – 105	Greece
Turkey	130 – 52	Morocco
Yugoslavia	138 – 55	Tunisia

- September 27, 1979

Yugoslavia	109 – 63	Egypt
Turkey	73 – 86	Greece
Tunisia	79 – 74	Morocco

- September 28, 1979

Turkey	123 – 85	Tunisia
Yugoslavia	74 – 85	Greece
Egypt	98 – 80	Morocco

== Final standings ==
Rank	Team
1st place, gold medalist(s)	Greece Liveris Andritsos, Minas Gkekos, Panagiotis Giannakis, Takis Karatzoulidis, Giorgos Kastrinakis, Manthos Katsoulis, Dimitris Kokolakis, Takis Koronaios, Vasilis Paramanidis, Kostas Petropoulos, Sotiris Sakellariou. Coach: Richard Dukeshire
2nd place, silver medalist(s)	Yugoslavia Stevan Gešovski, Miodrag Marić, Rajko Žižić, Željko Poljak, Damir Pavličević, Mihovil Nakić, Sabit Hadžić, Andro Knego, Ratko Radovanović, Ivica Dukan, Boban Petrović, Mirza Delibašić. Coach: Petar Skansi
3rd place, bronze medalist(s)	Egypt Mohamed Abdelrahman, Zakaria Abou Zaid, Mohamed Ahmed, Tareq el-Sabbagh, Hamdi Adly El-Seoudi, Mohamed el-Gohary Hanafy, Mohamed Essam Khaled, Adel Moustafa, Amin Shouman, Mohamed Sayed Soliman, Mohsen Medhat Warda.
4	Turkey Cihangir Sonat, Aytek Gürkan, Necati Güler, Doğan Hakyemez, Melih Erçin, Erman Kunter, Mehmet Döğüşken, Serdar Koçyiğit, Efe Aydan, Şadi Olcay, Sabri Duman. Coach: Rüştü Yüce
5	Tunisia
6	Morocco
