= Slobodan Subotić =

Slovenian basketball player and coach

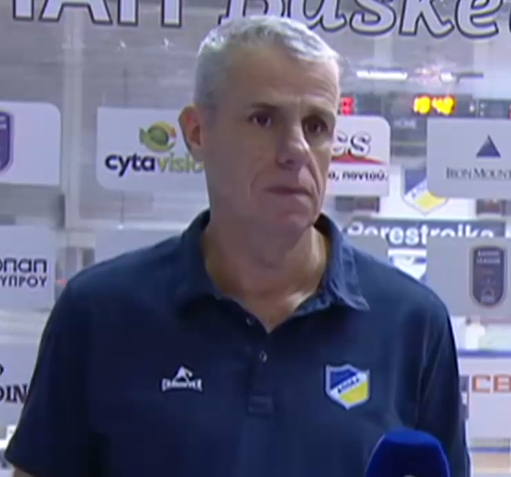

Free agent
- Title: Head coach

Personal information
- Born: 15 August 1956 (age 70) Herceg Novi, PR Montenegro, FPR Yugoslavia
- Listed height: 6 ft 7.5 in (2.02 m)
- Listed weight: 200 lb (91 kg)

Career information
- NBA draft: 1978: undrafted
- Playing career: 1975–1993
- Position: Shooting guard / small forward
- Coaching career: 1993–present

Career history

Playing
- 1975–1986: Smelt Olimpija
- 1986–1993: Aris

Coaching
- 1993–1994: Iraklis (assistant)
- 1994–1996: Iraklis
- 1996: AEK Athens
- 1996–1997: Aris
- 1997–1999: Panathinaikos
- 1999: Slovenia (assistant)
- 2000–2001: Panionios
- 2001: PAOK
- 2001–2003: Slovenia
- 2002–2003: Olympiacos
- 2004–2005: Aurora Basket Jesi
- 2006–2008: Split
- 2009–2010: Cedevita
- 2011: Aris
- 2012–2016: Al Riyadi
- 2017: Cibona
- 2018–2019: Lebanon
- 2019: Budućnost
- 2020–2021: Club Africain
- 2022-: APOEL

Career highlights
- As player: 5× Greek League champion (1987, 1988–1991); 5× Greek Cup winner (1987–1990, 1992); Gree All-Star (1991); As head coach: FIBA Korać Cup champion (1997); 2× Greek League champion (1998, 1999); Greek Cup winner (2002); 2× Greek League Coach of the Year (1998, 1999); 3× FLB champion (2014–2016)

Slobodan "Piksi" Subotić (Serbian Cyrillic: Слободан Суботић, Greek: Σλόμπονταν Σούμποτιτς; born 15 August 1956) is a Greek-Slovenian professional basketball coach and former player. He last served as the head coach for Budućnost of the ABA League, Montenegrin League and the EuroCup.

He has Greek citizenship, which he obtained to circumvent EU administrative restrictions while playing and coaching there. To be able to obtain Greek citizenship, he had to administratively change his name in the eyes of Greek law, and is thus known there as Slompontan "Lefteris" Soumpotits (Greek: Σλόμπονταν "Λευτέρης" Σούμποτιτς). In addition to having Slovenian and Greek citizenship, he also holds Bosnian citizenship. At 2.02 m (6'7 1/2") tall, he was a swingman.

== Playing career ==
Subotić helped the Greek club Aris qualify for the EuroLeague's Final Four in three consecutive years (1988, 1989 and 1990). With Aris, he was a five-time Greek League champion, in the years 1987, 1988, 1989, 1990 and 1991, and also a five time Greek Cup winner, in the years 1987, 1988, 1989, 1990 and 1992.

== Coaching career ==
Subotić followed up his playing career by moving on to work as a basketball coach. Some of the clubs that he has been the head coach of include: Greek clubs Iraklis, AEK, Aris, Panathnaikos, Panionios, PAOK and Olympiacos, Croatian club Split and Al Riyadi of the Lebanese Basketball League.

As the head coach, he won the Greek League championship twice, in 1998 and 1999, the Greek Cup in 2002, the FIBA Korać Cup in 1997 and the Lebanese League championship in 2014 and 2015. He extended his contract with Al Riyadi for three more years in 2015.

He was also an assistant coach with the senior men's Slovenia national team in 1999, as well as the head coach of Slovenia from 2001 to 2003, coaching them at the 2003 EuroBasket. In 2012 he became the general manager of the Slovenian club Union Olimpija.

On 18 June 2017, Subotić was named the head coach of Croatian club Cibona, with which he parted ways on 11 November 2017.

In the 2020–21 season, he coached Club Africain in the Tunisian Championnat National A.

== Awards and accomplishments ==
=== Player ===
- 5× Greek League Champion: (1986–87, 1987–88, 1988–89, 1989–90, 1990–91)
- 5× Greek Cup Winner: (1987, 1988, 1989, 1990, 1992)

=== Head coach ===
- FIBA Korać Cup Champion: (1996–97)
- 2× Greek League Champion: (1997–98, 1998–99)
- Greek Cup Winner: (2002)
- 2× Greek League Best Coach: (1998, 1999)
