= Memos Ioannou =

Greek basketball player and coach

Personal information
- Born: 15 April 1958 (age 68) Athens, Greece
- Listed height: 6 ft 3 in (1.91 m)
- Listed weight: 195 lb (88 kg)

Career information
- Playing career: 1974–1993
- Position: Point guard / shooting guard
- Number: 14
- Coaching career: 1992–present

Career history

Playing
- 1974–1990: Panathinaikos
- 1990–1991: PAOK
- 1991–1993: Aris

Coaching
- 1992: Aris (player-coach)
- 1993–1994: Aris
- 1997–1999: APOEL
- 1999–2002: Keravnos
- 2003–2004: Ilysiakos
- 2004–2006: Panionios
- 2009–2011: Keravnos
- 2016–2017: Holargos

Career highlights
- As a player: 2× FIBA Saporta Cup champion (1991, 1993); 6× Greek League champion (1975, 1977, 1980, 1981, 1982, 1984); 5× Greek Cup winner (1979, 1982, 1983, 1986, 1992); As a head coach: Greek Cup winner (1992); 4× Cypriot League champion (1998–2001)
Medals
Men's basketball
Representing Greece
FIBA EuroBasket
Gold medal – first place	1987 Greece
FIBA Europe U16 Championship
Silver medal – second place	1975 Greece	Under-16

Agamemnon "Memos" Ioannou (Greek: Αγαμέμνων "Μέμος" Ιωάννου; born April 15, 1958, in Greece) is a retired Greek professional basketball player and coach. At 6 ft 3 in (1.91 m), he played at the point guard and shooting guard positions.

== Professional career ==
Ioannou had a successful playing career with Panathinaikos, as he won 6 Greek League championships (1975, 1977, 1980, 1981, 1982, 1984) and 4 Greek Cups (1979, 1982, 1983, 1986) with the club. He also won another Greek Cup with Aris, in the 1991–92 season. At that final, he was interim coach. In 1991, he won the FIBA European Cup Winners' Cup (later called FIBA Saporta Cup) championship, while playing with PAOK. In 1993, Ioannou won the FIBA European Cup again, this time while playing with Aris.

== National team career ==
Ioannou was also a member of the senior men's Greek national team that won the gold medal at the 1987 FIBA EuroBasket. He also played at the 1988 FIBA European Olympic Qualifying Tournament and the 1990 FIBA World Championship.

== Coaching career ==
After his playing career ended, Ioannou became a professional basketball coach. As a head coach, he won four Cypriot League championships, in the years 1998, 1999, 2000, and 2001.

== Personal life ==
Ioannou is the father of the professional basketball player Stelios Ioannou. He also worked as a color commentator for EuroLeague and Greek Basket League game broadcasts, on Greek TV.
