= Steve Giatzoglou =

Greek American basketball coach

Steve Giatzoglou Στήβ Γιατζόγλου
Personal information
- Born: 11 December 1949 (age 76) New York City, New York, U.S.
- Listed height: 6 ft 2 in (1.88 m)
- Listed weight: 205 lb (93 kg)

Career information
- College: UConn (1967–1971)
- NBA draft: 1971: undrafted
- Playing career: 1971–1985
- Position: Point guard / shooting guard
- Number: 5
- Coaching career: 1985–2016

Career history

Playing
- 1972–1984: Olympiacos Piraeus
- 1984–1985: PAOK Thessaloniki

Coaching
- 1985–1986: Aris Thessaloniki (assistant)
- 1986–1989: Olympiacos Piraeus
- 1989–1990: Sporting Athens
- 1990–1992: Iraklis Thessaloniki
- 1992–1993: Aris Thessaloniki
- 1993–1994: AEK Athens
- 1994: Pagrati Athens
- 1994: Peristeri Athens
- 1996: Iraklis Thessaloniki
- 1996–1999: Gymnastikos S. Larissas
- 2000–2001: Aris Thessaloniki
- 2006–2007: Aigaleo Athens
- 2014–2015: Goyang Orions (assistant)
- 2015–2016: Kavala

Career highlights
- As a player: 2× Greek League champion (1976, 1978); 4× Greek Cup winner (1976–1978, 1980); 4× Greek Cup Finals Top Scorer (1977–1980)
Medals
Event	1st	2nd	3rd
Mediterranean Games	1	0	0
Balkan Championship	1	1	3
Total	2	1	3
Men's basketball
Representing Greece
Mediterranean Games
Gold medal – first place	1979 Yugoslavia	
Balkan Championship
Gold medal – first place	1979 Greece	
Silver medal – second place	1972 Yugoslavia	
Bronze medal – third place	1974 Greece	
Bronze medal – third place	1976 Bulgaria	
Bronze medal – third place	1980 Romania	

Stylianos "Steve" Giatzoglou (alternate spellings: Yatzoglou, Yantzoglou; Greek: Στυλιανός "Στηβ" Γιατζόγλου; born 11 December 1949), is a Greek American professional basketball coach, and the president of the Union of Greek Basketball Athletes. He's also a former basketball player, having competed professionally in the Greek Basket League. During his playing career, his nickname was "The Lion".

== College career ==
Under the name Steve Young, Giatzoglou played college basketball at the University of Connecticut, where he played with the school's men's team, the UConn Huskies.

== Professional career ==
After college, Giatzoglou began his professional club career in Lebanon. Giatzoglou's pro career was mainly noted for his successes with the Greek Basket League club Olympiacos Piraeus. He's considered today as one of the greatest players in the club's history. With Olympiacos, he won 2 Greek League championships and 4 Greek Cups. He was the Greek Cup Finals Top Scorer in 1977, 1978, 1979, and 1980. He also played with the Greek club PAOK Thessaloniki.

In the top-tier level amateur Greek Championship (1963–1992), he scored a total of 6,044 points, which was the which was the 10th most total points scored in the competition.

== National team career ==
Giatzoglou made his debut with the senior Greek national team, on 6 May 1973. With Greece's senior national team, he had a total of 115 caps, in which he scored a total of 1,468 points, for a scoring average of 12.8 points per game.

Giatzoglou played in three FIBA EuroBasket tournaments with Greece's national team. He played at the 1973 FIBA EuroBasket, the 1975 FIBA EuroBasket, and the 1979 FIBA EuroBasket. His last game with the Greek national team was on 18 February 1981, in a friendly game against the Bulgarian national team.

== Coaching career ==
As a basketball head coach, Giatzoglou worked in several clubs in Greece, including: Olympiacos Piraeus, Sporting Athens, Iraklis Thessaloniki, Aris Thessaloniki, AEK Athens, Pagrati Athens, Peristeri Athens, Gymnastikos S. Larissas, Aigaleo Athens, and Kavala. In 2014, Giatzoglou was hired as an assistant coach to work in South Korea, with the Goyang Orions of the Korean Basketball League. In 2015, Giatzoglou returned to Greece to coach Kavala.

== Awards and accomplishments ==
=== Olympiacos Piraeus ===
- 2× Greek League Champion: (1976, 1978)
- 4× Greek Cup Winner: (1976, 1977, 1978, 1980)
- 2× Greek Cup Finalist: (1979, 1983)
- 4× Greek Cup Finals Top Scorer: (1977–1980)
- Olympiacos Piraeus Club Legend

=== Greek national team ===
- 1972 Balkan Championship: Silver
- 1974 Balkan Championship: Bronze
- 1976 Balkan Championship: Bronze
- 1979 Mediterranean Games: Gold
- 1979 Balkan Championship: Gold
- 1980 Balkan Championship: Bronze

== Personal life ==
In October 2016, Giatzoglou endorsed the Neo-Nazi political party Golden Dawn, and attended the celebration of their newspaper's 1,000th issue. In 2020, he joined the Greek nationalist party Greeks for the Fatherland, as a party executive.

== See also ==
- Players with the most points scored in the Amateur Greek Basketball Championship (1963–1992)

== Additional sources ==
- Steve Giatzoglou - Biography & Career Statistics
- Legends of the Legend : Steve Giatzoglou at the Olympiacos website
- Steve Giatzoglou, FIBA website
- Steve Giatzoglou, FIBA Europe website
- Τα “κανόνια” του ελληνικού Πρωταθλήματος: Στιβ Γιατζόγλου (in Greek)
