= Theodoros Asteriadis =

Greek basketball coach and player

Iraklis
- Title: Youth academy head coach
- League: Greek Basketball League

Personal information
- Born: May 24, 1972 (age 54) Thessaloniki, Greece
- Listed height: 6 ft 3.59 in (1.92 m)

Career information
- Playing career: 1990–1998
- Position: Point guard / shooting guard

Career history
- 1990-1991: Dimokritos Thessaloniki
- 1991–1992: P.A.O.K.
- 1992–1993: Sporting Athens
- 1993–1996: Iraklis Thessaloniki
- 1996–1998: M.E.N.T.

Career highlights
- Greek League champion (1992)
Medals
Men's basketball
Representing Greece
FIBA Europe Under-16 Championship
Gold medal – first place	1989 Spain	National Team

Theodoros Asteriadis (Greek: Θεόδωρος Αστεριάδης; born May 24, 1972) is a retired Greek professional basketball player and is the current youth academy head coach for Iraklis of the Greek Basketball League.

== Early years ==
Asteriadis joined at P.A.O.K. when he was eight years old, and he won the Greek Championship for Cadets in 1988 and the Greek Championship for Junior Men in 1990. He made his debut in Greek Basketball League during 1989–90 season

== Professional career ==
Asteriadis signed his first professional with P.A.O.K. in 1991. He won the Greek Basketball League Championship in 1992 and he played in 1991–92 FIBA European Cup, having 5.7 points average. In 1992 he moved to Sporting B.C. His club was relegated after an 80–78 defeat from Pagrati B.C. Asteriadis send the game into the overtime with a three-point shot from the half of the court. In 1993 he signed with Iraklis Thessaloniki, and he played until 1996. He helped his club to qualify in 1995–96 FIBA European League for the first time in its history. Asteriadis, during 1995–96 season had 3.7 points per game at FIBA European League. He finished his career playing for M.E.N.T. B.C. in Greek A2 Basket League. After, his retirement he became a basketball coach for PAOK academies.

== National team ==
Asteriadis won the gold medal in 1989 FIBA Europe Under-16 Championship. He also played in 1993 Mediterranean Games, and he took the fourth place. Moreover, he played at FIBA Under-21 World Championship in 1993.

== Personal ==
His father Asterios was also basketball player, who won the Greek championship with P.A.O.K. in 1959. His son Asterios (born 2003) is also a professional player.
