= Georgios Doxakis =

Greek basketball player and coach

Personal information
- Born: 3 March 1962 (age 64) Thessaloniki, Greece
- Listed height: 6 ft 0.5 in (1.84 m)

Career information
- Playing career: 1981–1993
- Position: Point guard

Career history
- 1981–1991: Aris
- 1991–1993: Panionios

Career highlights
- As a player: 8× Greek League champion (1983, 1985–1991); 5× Greek Cup winner (1985, 1987–1990)

Georgios Doxakis (alternate spelling: Giorgos) (Greek: Γιώργος Δοξάκης) (born 3 March 1962 in Thessaloniki, Greece) is a former Greek professional basketball player and a basketball coach. He was a 1.84 m (6 ft 1/2 in) tall point guard.

== Playing career ==
Doxakis played with the Greek League clubs Aris (1981–91) and Panionios (1991–93).

== Coaching career ==
After he retired from playing basketball, he began a career as a basketball coach.

== Awards and accomplishments ==
=== Player ===
- 8× Greek League Champion: (1983, 1985, 1986, 1987, 1988, 1989, 1990, 1991)
- 5× Greek Cup Winner: (1985, 1987, 1988, 1989, 1990)
