= Kostas Petropoulos =

Greek basketball player and coach (born 1956)

Personal information
- Born: January 7, 1956 (age 70) Patras, Greece
- Listed height: 6 ft 5.75 in (1.97 m)
- Listed weight: 215 lb (98 kg)

Career information
- Playing career: 1971–1987
- Position: Shooting guard / small forward
- Number: 7
- Coaching career: 1988–2005

Career history

Playing
- 1971–1987: Apollon Patras

Coaching
- 1988–1993: Greece Under-16
- 1988: Greece Under-17
- 1989: Greece Women's
- 1989–1993: Greece (assistant)
- 1991–1993: Peristeri
- 1993–1995: Apollon Patras
- 1996–1998: Sporting
- 1998–1999: Maroussi
- 1999–2001: Greece
- 2001–2002: Maroussi
- 2004–2005: Panellinios

Career highlights
- As a player: 2× Greek 2nd Division champion (1976, 1979); No. 7 retired by Apollon Patras (2016)
Medals
Men's Basketball
Representing Greece
Mediterranean Games
Gold medal – first place	1979 Yugoslavia

Konstantinos "Kostas" Petropoulos (Greek: Κωνσταντίνος "Κώστας" Πετρόπουλος) is a Greek former professional basketball coach, and a retired professional basketball player. During his playing career, he was nicknamed "Nureyev". His number 7 jersey was retired by Apollon Patras, in 2016. On 1 February 2020, the Kostas Petropoulos Indoor Hall basketball arena, was named after him, in his honor.

== Professional career ==
During his pro club career, Petropoulos played basketball with the Greek club Apollon Patras, from 1971 to 1987. On 4 April 1976, in a Greek Second Division game between Apollon Patras and Agrinio, Petropoulos scored 93 points. On 11 January 1986, in a Greek First Division game between Apollon Patras and Ionikos Nikaias, Petropoulos scored 51 points.

After having six surgeries due to injuries, Petropoulos retired from playing pro club basketball in 1987, at the age of 31. Over his pro club career, Petropoulos scored a total of 4,255 points in Greece's top-tier level Basket League.

== National team career ==
With Greece's junior national teams, Petropoulos played at the 1973 FIBA Europe Under-16 Championship, and at the 1974 FIBA Europe Under-18 Championship.

Petropoulos was also a member of the senior men's Greek national team. He played in 77 games with Greece's senior national team. With Greece, he won the gold medal at the 1979 Mediterranean Games. He also played with Greece at the 1980 FIBA European Olympic Qualifying Tournament, and at the 1981 FIBA EuroBasket.

== Coaching career ==
=== Clubs ===
After he finished his playing career, Petropoulos became a basketball coach. He acted as the head coach of the Greek clubs Apollon Patras, Sporting Athens, Maroussi Athens, and Panellinios Athens. He was a Greek Cup finalist with Maroussi in 2002.

=== Greek national team ===
Petropoulos was the head coach of the senior men's Greek national team, from 1999 to 2001. He was Greece's head coach at the 1999 FIBA EuroBasket and the 2001 FIBA EuroBasket.
