= Pavlos Diakoulas =

Greek American basketball player and coach

Personal information
- Born: April 16, 1950 (age 76) Baltimore, USA
- Listed height: 6 ft 8 in (2.03 m)

Career information
- College: Baltimore Poly Engineers (1968–1972)
- Position: Small forward / power forward / center
- Number: 7

Career history
- 1972–1982: Olympiacos

Career highlights
- As player: 2× Greek League champion (1976, 1978); 4× Greek Cup winner (1976–1978, 1980)

Pavlos Diakoulas (alternate spelling: Paul) (Greek: Παύλος Διάκουλας) is a retired Greek American professional basketball player and coach. During his pro club career, he played at the small forward, power forward, and center positions.

== College career ==
Diakoulas played college basketball at Baltimore Polytechnic Institute, where he played with the school's men's team, the Baltimore Poly Engineers, from 1968 to 1972.

== Professional career ==
Diakoulas played professional basketball in the Greek League with Olympiacos Piraeus. He was a member of Olympiacos during their undefeated season in the Greek League, during the 1975–76 season. With Olympiacos, he played in all 3 of Europe's major European-wide club tournaments at the time. He played in the top-tier level FIBA European Champions Cup (now called EuroLeague, 1976–77, 1978–79), in the second-tier level FIBA Cup Winners' Cup (later called FIBA Saporta Cup, 1975–76, 1977–78), and in the third-tier level FIBA Korać Cup (1979–80).

He also played with Kolossos Rodou, in the Greek lower divisions, in the 1980s.

== National team career ==
Diakoulas played in 30 games with the senior Greek national basketball team, scoring a total of 189 points, for a scoring average of 6.3 points per game. He was a member of Greece's senior national team at the EuroBasket 1975.

== Coaching career ==
Diakoulas was the head coach of the Greek club Aigaleo.

== Awards and accomplishments ==
=== As a player ===
- 2× Greek League Champion: (1976, 1978)
- 4× Greek Cup Winner: (1976, 1977, 1978, 1980)
