= Michalis Romanidis =

Greek basketball player (born 1966)

Personal information
- Born: June 19, 1966 (age 60) Thessaloniki, Greece
- Listed height: 6 ft 6.5 in (1.99 m)
- Listed weight: 210 lb (95 kg)

Career information
- Playing career: 1982–1994
- Positions: Small forward, power forward

Career history
- 1982–1992: Aris
- 1992–1994: Pagrati

Career highlights
- 8× Greek League champion (1983, 1985–1991); 6× Greek Cup winner (1985, 1987–1990, 1992)
Medals
Men's basketball
Representing Greece
EuroBasket
Gold medal – first place	1987 Greece

Michalis Romanidis (alternate spelling: Michail) (Greek: Μιχάλης Ρωμανίδης; born June 19, 1966) is a retired Greek professional basketball player. At 199 cm (6 ft 6 1/2 in) tall, he played at the small forward and power forward positions.

== Professional career ==
While a member of the Greek club Aris, Romanidis won 8 Greek League championships (1983, 1985, 1986, 1987, 1988, 1989, 1990, 1991) and 6 Greek Cup titles (1985, 1987, 1988, 1989, 1990, 1992). He also played at 3 EuroLeague Final Fours (1988, 1989, 1990) with Aris.

He also played with Pagrati.

== National team career ==
Romanidis was also a member of the senior men's Greek national team. He played with Greece at the 1983 EuroBasket, the 1984 FIBA European Olympic Qualifying Tournament, and the 1986 FIBA World Championship. He was also a member of Greece's team that won the gold medal at 1987 EuroBasket. He played in 82 games with Greece, averaging 4.4 points per game.

== Post-playing career ==
After he ended his pro playing career, Romanidis worked as basketball executive. He worked in the management of the Greek clubs Milon, Alimos, Dafni, and Rethymno.

== Awards and accomplishments ==
=== Pro career ===
- 8× Greek League Champion: (1983, 1985, 1986, 1987, 1988, 1989, 1990, 1991)
- 6× Greek Cup Winner: (1985, 1987, 1988, 1989, 1990, 1992)

=== Greek senior national team ===
- 1987 EuroBasket: Gold
