= Vangelis Vourtzoumis =

Greek basketball player

Personal information
- Born: October 30, 1969 (age 57) Athens, Greece
- Listed height: 6 ft 4.75 in (1.95 m)
- Listed weight: 212 lb (96 kg)

Career information
- Playing career: 1988–2002
- Position: Shooting guard / small forward

Career history
- 1988–1995: Aris
- 1995–1998: Panathinaikos
- 1998–1999: Near East
- 1999–2000: S.S. Felice Scandone
- 1999–2001: Maroussi
- 2001–2002: KAOD

Career highlights
- FIBA Intercontinental Cup champion (1996); EuroLeague champion (1996); 2× FIBA Saporta Cup champion (1993, 2001); 4× Greek League champion (1989, 1990, 1991, 1998); 4× Greek Cup winner (1989, 1990, 1992, 1996)

Evangelos "Vangelis" Vourtzoumis (alternate spelling: Vaggelis) (Greek: Βαγγέλης Βουρτζούμης) (born October 30, 1969) is a retired Greek professional basketball player.

== Professional career ==
Vourtzoumis won three European titles on three different Greek teams. In 1993, he played with Aris and with them he won the FIBA Cup Winners' Cup against Efes, at Torino. In 1996, he played with Panathinaikos, and with them, he was a winner of the EuroLeague championship in Paris. In 2001, he won the FIBA Saporta Cup championship with Maroussi.

Vourtzoumis also won the Greek League championship in 1989, 1990, and 1991, and two Greek Cups, in 1990 and 1992, while playing with Aris. He also won the 1998 Greek League championship, and the 1996 Greek Cup title, with Panathinaikos.

== National team career ==
Vourtzoumis had eight caps with the senior men's Greek national basketball team, and he averaged 5.9 points per game.
