= Kostas Mourouzis =

Greek basketball player and coach

Kostas Mourouzis Ντίνος Μουρούζης
Personal information
- Born: 10 May 1934 Athens, Greece
- Died: 11 June 2014 (aged 80) Athens, Greece

Career information
- Playing career: 1948–1962
- Coaching career: 1959–1987

Career history

Playing
- 1948–1955: Triton
- 1955–1959: S.C. Gira
- 1959–1962: Triton

Coaching
- 1959–1966: Triton
- 1966–1974: Panathinaikos
- 1972–1974: Greece
- 1974–1976: AEK Athens
- 1976–1980: Olympiacos Piraeus
- Milon
- Esperos
- 1986–1987: Panathinaikos
- 1987–1988: Panathinaikos (sports director)

Career highlights
- As head coach: 7× Greek League champion (1967, 1969, 1971–1974, 1978); 2× Greek Cup winner (1977, 1978)
Medals
Men's basketball
Representing Greece
Mediterranean Games
Bronze medal – third place	1955 Spain

Konstantinos "Kostas" Mourouzis (Greek: Κωνσταντίνος "Κώστας" Μουρούζης; May 10, 1934 to June 11, 2014), also commonly known as Dinos Mourouzis (Greek: Ντίνος Μουρούζης), was a Greek professional basketball player and coach. His nickname was, "The Fox of the Bench".

== Playing career ==
=== Club career ===
Mourouzis started playing youth club basketball in Greece, with the youth clubs of Triton, in 1945, and made the club's men's senior team in 1948. He also played in the top-tier level Italian League, with Sporting Club Gira Bologna, in the mid to late 1950s.

=== National team career ===
Mourouzis played with the senior Greek national basketball team in 24 games, averaging 10.1 points per game. With Greece, he won the bronze medal at the 1955 Mediterranean Games. He also played at the 1960 FIBA Pre-Olympic Tournament, and the 1961 FIBA EuroBasket.

== Coaching career ==
=== Clubs ===
Mourouzis began working as a basketball coach in 1959, with the Greek club Triton. As the head coach of the Greek Basket League club Panathinaikos, he won 6 Greek League championships (1967, 1969, 1971, 1972, 1973, 1974). He also led Panathinaikos to the semifinals of the European-wide second-tier level FIBA Cup Winners Cup (later called FIBA Saporta Cup), in the 1968–69 season, and to the semifinals of the European-wide top-tier level FIBA European Champions Cup (later called EuroLeague), in the 1971–72 season.

After coaching AEK Athens, he moved to Olympiacos. With Olympiacos, he won the Greek Cup title in 1977, and both the Greek League championship and the Greek Cup title in 1978. In the 1978–79 season, he led Olympiacos to a 6th-place finish in the FIBA European Champions Cup (EuroLeague).

=== Greek national team ===
Mourouzis was also the head coach of the senior Greek national basketball team. He was Greece's head coach at the 1973 EuroBasket.

== Personal life ==
Mourouzis died in Athens, Greece, on June 11, 2014.
