= Takis Koroneos =

Greek basketball player and coach

Personal information
- Born: October 8, 1952 (age 74) Rethymno, Greece
- Listed height: 6 ft 1.25 in (1.86 m)
- Listed weight: 180 lb (82 kg)

Career information
- College: Mississippi State University (1970–1974)
- NBA draft: 1974: undrafted
- Playing career: 1968–1990
- Position: Point guard / shooting guard
- Number: 9

Career history
- 1968–1985: Panathinaikos
- 1985–1986: PAOK
- 1986–1989: Panionios
- 1989–1990: Panathinaikos

Career highlights
- As a player: 11× Greek League champion (1969, 1971, 1972, 1973, 1974, 1975, 1977, 1980, 1981, 1982, 1984); 3× Greek Cup winner (1979, 1982, 1983); Greek Cup Finals Top Scorer (1983)
Medals
Men's Basketball
Representing Greece
Mediterranean Games
Gold medal – first place	1979 Yugoslavia
Balkan Championship
Gold medal – first place	1979 Greece
Silver medal – second place	1972 Yugoslavia
Bronze medal – third place	1974 Greece
Bronze medal – third place	1976 Bulgaria
Bronze medal – third place	1977 Yugoslavia
Bronze medal – third place	1980 Romania

Panagiotis "Takis" Koroneos (alternate spellings: Taki, Koronaios, Greek: Παναγιώτης "Τάκης" Κορωναίος; born October 8, 1952) is a retired Greek professional basketball player and a professional basketball coach. He is also a former member of the Greece men's national basketball team. During his playing career, his nickname was, "The Galis Before Galis".

During his playing career, Koroneos was credited with discovering Rony Seikaly, while he was a youth in Greece. In 1981, Koroneos met Seikaly, who was 16 at the time, after he purchased a pair of large basketball sneakers in Koroneos' athletics store. On the recommendation of Koroneos to the management of Panathinaikos, Seikaly was then selected to join Panathinaikos' men's senior team, in order to begin training and practicing with them.

== College career ==
Koroneos joined the youth teams of Panathinaikos in 1965, and he began his career with the club's senior men's team, in 1968. However, he still retained his amateur status for the NCAA DI. In 1970, he then began to play college basketball in the United States, at Mississippi State University, where he played with the Mississippi State Bulldogs.

== Club career ==
Koroneos had a long tenure with the Greek team Panathinaikos Athens. With Panathinaikos, he won 11 Greek League championships and 3 Greek Cup titles. While a member of Panathinaikos, he was also the Greek Cup Finals Top Scorer in 1983.

In 2008, he was voted as one of the 100 greatest athletes in the first 100 years in the history of all the sports divisions of the Panathinaikos Athletic Club. He was voted the 60th most important athlete overall, and the 12th most important basketball player, in the club's first 100 years. During his career, he also played with PAOK Thessaloniki and Panionios Athens.

In the top-tier level amateur Greek Championship (1963–1992), he scored a total of 7,465 points, which was the 5th most total points scored in the competition.

== National team career ==
Koroneos played with the Greece men's national basketball team in 150 games, in which he recorded a personal total of 1,832 points. His first game with the Greece men's national team was played on July 25, 1972, against the Bulgaria men's national basketball team, during the Balkan Championship. His last game played with Greece was on October 29, 1981, against the Poland men's national basketball team, in a friendly game.

Koroneos played at the 1972 Pre-Olympic Tournament, the 1975 EuroBasket, the 1979 EuroBasket, and the 1981 EuroBasket. They won gold medals at the 1979 Mediterranean Games, and the 1979 Balkan Championship.

== Coaching career ==
After his playing career ended, Koroneos worked as the head coach of the clubs Maroussi Athens, Dafni Athens, Near East Kaisariani, Keravnos Strovolou Women, Panionios Athens Women and Panathinaikos Athens women (during the 2008–09 season).

== Awards and accomplishments ==
=== Pro career ===
- 11× Greek League Champion: (1969, 1971, 1972, 1973, 1974, 1975, 1977, 1980, 1981, 1982, 1984)
- 3× Greek Cup Winner: (1979, 1982, 1983)
- Greek Cup Finals Top Scorer: (1983)
- 5th all-time leading scorer of the Greek Basketball Championship, with 7,465 total points scored in the Greek A National League (1963–64 season to present).

=== Greece national team ===
- 1979 Mediterranean Games: Gold
- Balkan Championship:
  - Gold: (1979)
  - Silver: (1972)
  - Bronze: (1974, 1976, 1977, 1980)

== See also ==
- Players with the most points scored in the Amateur Greek Basketball Championship (1963–1992)

== Bibliography ==
- Panathinaikos - 90 Years On An Historic Run 1908-1998, P. Fiamegos, Athens 1998
