= Dimitris Kokolakis =

Greek basketball player

Personal information
- Born: November 11, 1949 (age 77) Rethymno, Greece
- Listed height: 7 ft 0.75 in (2.15 m)
- Listed weight: 250 lb (113 kg)

Career information
- Playing career: 1969–1988
- Position: Center
- Number: 15

Career history
- 1969–1983: Panathinaikos
- 1983–1987: Aris
- 1987–1988: Ilysiakos

Career highlights
- As a player: 12× Greek League champion (1971, 1972, 1973, 1974, 1975, 1977, 1980, 1981, 1982, 1985, 1986, 1987); 5× Greek Cup winner (1979, 1982, 1983, 1985, 1987)
Medals
Men's Basketball
Representing Greece
Mediterranean Games
Gold medal – first place	1979 Yugoslavia

Dimitris Kokolakis (alternate spelling: Dimitrios) (Greek: Δημήτρης Κοκολάκης; born November 11, 1949) is a retired Greek professional basketball player. He was born in Rethymno, Greece. At a height of 2.15 m (7 ft. 3/4 in.), he played at the center position.

== Professional career ==
Kokolakis joined the Greek League club Panathinaikos in 1969. With Panathinaikos, he won 9 Greek League championships (1971, 1972, 1973, 1974, 1975, 1977, 1980, 1981, 1982), and 3 Greek Cups (1979, 1982, 1983). He then moved to the Greek club Aris in 1983. With Aris, he won 3 more Greek League championships (1985, 1986, 1987), and two more Greek Cups (1985 and 1987).

== National team career ==
Kokolakis was also a member of the senior men's Greek national basketball team. In 178 caps played with Greece's senior men's team, he scored 1,280 points, for an average of 7.2 points per game. He played at the 1975 FIBA EuroBasket, the 1979 FIBA EuroBasket, the 1981 FIBA EuroBasket, and the 1983 FIBA EuroBasket. He also played at the 1980 FIBA European Olympic Qualifying Tournament.

== Awards and accomplishments ==
=== Pro career ===
- 12× Greek League Champion: (1971, 1972, 1973, 1974, 1975, 1977, 1980, 1981, 1982, 1985, 1986, 1987)
- 5× Greek Cup Winner: (1979, 1982, 1983, 1985, 1987)

=== Greek national team ===
- 1979 Mediterranean Games: Gold
