= Georgios Amerikanos =

Greek basketball player (1942–2013)

Personal information
- Born: 21 December 1942 Nikaia, Piraeus, Athens, Greece
- Died: 7 October 2013 (aged 70) Athens, Greece
- Listed height: 6 ft 2 in (1.88 m)
- Listed weight: 205 lb (93 kg)

Career information
- Playing career: 1959–1977
- Position: Shooting guard
- Number: 10
- Coaching career: 1973–1987

Career history

Playing
- 1959–1975: AEK Athens
- 1975–1977: Apollon Patras

Coaching
- 1973–1974: Aigaleo Athens
- 1977–1978: AEK Athens
- 1979–1980: Apollon Patras
- 1985–1986: GS Kifissias
- 1986–1987: AEK Athens

Career highlights
- As a player: FIBA European Cup Winners' Cup champion (1968); FIBA European Cup Winners' Cup Finals Top Scorer (1968); 6× Greek League champion (1963–1966, 1968, 1970); 2× Greek League Top Scorer (1965, 1968); Greek 2nd Division champion (1976); No. 10 retired by AEK Athens (2015)
Medals
Event	1st	2nd	3rd
Balkan Championship	0	2	2
Total	0	2	2
Representing Greece
Men's basketball
Balkan Championship
Silver medal – second place	1963 Greece	
Silver medal – second place	1969 Greece	
Bronze medal – third place	1964 Romania	
Bronze medal – third place	1967 Yugoslavia	

Georgios Amerikanos (alternate spellings: Giorgos, George) (Greek: Γιώργος Αμερικάνος; 21 December 1942 – 7 October 2013) was a Greek professional basketball player and coach. He was nicknamed Global, or Worldwide, due to his last name meaning American in English, and the level of his game being "All-World". In honour of his great contributions to the club as a player, his number 10 jersey was retired by AEK Athens, in 2015.

== Youth career and early life ==
Amerikanos was born in Nikaia, Piraeus, Athens, Greece. His parents were refugees from Asia Minor. At a young age, Amerikanos started playing the sport of basketball with the youth club of HAN Nikaias (YMCA).

== Professional career ==
Amerikanos began his senor men's club career in 1959, when he joined the Greek club AEK Athens. He would eventually become one of the best players in the history of the club. With AEK, he won 6 Greek League championships, in the years 1963, 1964, 1965, 1966, 1968, and 1970. While a member of AEK, he was the Greek League Top Scorer twice, in the years 1965 and 1968.

Amerikanos also led AEK Athens to the 1966 Final Four of the FIBA European Champions Cup, which is now known as the EuroLeague. That 1966 Final Four was the first time that the EuroLeague ever used a final four system. Amerikanos had also thus led a Greek team to a final four in the EuroLeague, for the first time ever.

Amerikanos also led AEK Athens to the championship of the 2nd-tier level FIBA European Cup Winners' Cup of the 1967–68 season. That was the first European championship that was won by any Greek team, in any sport. Along with Slavia VŠ Prague's legendary player Jiří Zídek, Amerikanos was the top scorer of the finals, with a total of 31 points scored. That finals game was played at the Panathenaic Stadium, in Athens, where a total of 120,000 people were in attendance for the game. 80,000 fans were watching the game from inside the stadium, while another 40,000 fans watched and listened to the game right outside of the stadium's outer walls.

Amerikanos was also the Greek League Top Scorer twice during his career, in 1965 and 1968. In 1975, Amerikanos moved to the Greek club Apollon Patras. With Apollon, he won the Greek 2nd Division championship in 1976. Amerikanos retired from playing professional club basketball in 1977.

== National team career ==
Amerikanos was a member of the senior men's Greek national team. In 68 caps played with Greece's senior men's team, he scored a total of 1,076 points, for an average of 15.8 points per game. He played with Greece at the 1960 FIBA Pre-Olympic Tournament, the 1961 FIBA EuroBasket, the 1964 FIBA European Olympic Qualifying Tournament, and the 1965 FIBA EuroBasket. He was Greece's leading scorer at the 1961 EuroBasket, the 1964 European OQT, and the 1965 EuroBasket, with scoring averages of 15.5 points, 15.7 points, and 17.4 points per game.

Amerikanos also played with Greece at the 1967 Mediterranean Games, and at five Balkan Championships, in the years 1962, 1963, 1964, 1967, and 1969.

== Coaching career ==
After his playing career ended, Amerikanos worked as a basketball coach. He was the head coach of the Greek clubs Ergotelis, Apollon Patras, AEK Athens, and Aigaleo Athens. He led AEK Athens to the finals of the Greek Cup, in 1978.

== Awards and accomplishments ==
=== Pro clubs ===
- EuroLeague Final Four: (1966)
- FIBA European Cup Winners' Cup Champion: (1968)
- FIBA European Cup Winners' Cup Finals Top Scorer: (1968)
- 6× Greek League Champion: (1963, 1964, 1965, 1966, 1968, 1970)
- 2× Greek League Top Scorer: (1965, 1968)
- Greek 2nd Division Champion: (1976)
- Number 10 jersey retired by AEK Athens: (2015)

=== Greek senior national team ===
- 1963 Balkan Championship: Silver
- 1964 Balkan Championship: Bronze
- 1967 Balkan Championship: Bronze
- 1969 Balkan Championship: Silver
