= Kioumourtzoglou =

Kioumourtzoglou is a surname. Notable people with the surname include:

- Efthimis Kioumourtzoglou
- Orestis Kiomourtzoglou
