= Minas Gekos =

Greek professional basketball player and coach

Personal information
- Born: November 7, 1959 (age 67) Kurtuluş, Istanbul, Turkey
- Listed height: 6 ft 1.75 in (1.87 m)
- Listed weight: 195 lb (88 kg)

Career information
- NBA draft: 1981: undrafted
- Playing career: 1975–1995
- Position: Point guard / shooting guard
- Number: 9
- Coaching career: 1995–present

Career history

Playing
- 1975–1976: İstanbul Teknik Üniversitesi
- 1976–1991: AEK Athens
- 1991–1994: Panathinaikos
- 1994–1995: AEK Athens

Coaching
- 1995–1996: AEK Athens (assistant)
- 1997–1999: Panathinaikos (assistant)
- 1999–2000: Esperos Kallitheas
- 2000–2002: Apollon Patras
- 2003–2004: Papagou
- 2005–2006: Maroussi (assistant)
- 2006–2007: Panionios (assistant)
- 2007: Panionios
- 2010–2011: AEK Athens
- 2012–2013: Kolossos

Career highlights
- As a player: 2× Greek Cup winner (1981, 1993); Greek League All-Star (1991)
Medals
Men's Basketball
Representing Greece
Mediterranean Games
Gold medal – first place	1979 Yugoslavia

Minas Gekos (alternate spelling: Gkegos) (Greek: Μηνάς Γκέκος; born November 7, 1959, in Kurtuluş, Istanbul, Turkey) is a Greek professional basketball coach and a retired professional basketball player. At 6' 1 3/4" (1.87 m) in height, he played at the point guard and shooting guard positions.

== Professional career ==
Gekos started his playing career with İstanbul Teknik Üniversitesi in 1975. He later went to Greece, and joined AEK Athens, where he played until 1991. With AEK, he won the Greek Cup in 1981, and also played in the Greek Cup finals in 1978, 1980, and 1988.

Then he continued his career with Panathinaikos, from 1991 to 1994. As a member of the Panathinaikos roster, he won the Greek Cup in 1993, although he did not play in the final. Overall, he played in 4 Greek Cup Finals, and scored a total of 73 points in those games. He returned to AEK Athens, for the last season of his career as a player (1994–95).

In the top-tier level amateur Greek Championship (1963–1992), he scored a total of 6,511 points, which was the which was the 9th most total points scored in the competition. In the Greek A1 National League (which only counts Greek League games played since the 1986–87 season), he played in a total of 188 games, and scored 2,701 points.

== National team career ==
Gekos played in 53 games with the senior men's Greek national team. With Greece's senior national team, he played at the 1979 FIBA EuroBasket and the 1983 FIBA EuroBasket. He also won gold medals at the 1979 Balkan Championship, and the 1979 Mediterranean Games.

== Coaching career ==
After he retired from playing professional basketball, Gekos started his coaching career in 1995, when he became an assistant coach under Vlado Đurović and Slobodan Subotić, in AEK Athens. In 1997, he became an assistant coach, under Subotić, with Panathinaikos. He became the head coach of Esperos Kallitheas, in 1999.

He then became the head coach of Apollon Patras, in 2000. He next became head coach of Papagou, in 2003. After that, he was Panagiotis Giannakis' assistant coach in Maroussi, and Luka Pavićević's assistant coach in Panionios.

He then worked as the head coach of Panionios, AEK Athens, and Kolossos.

== Awards and accomplishments ==
=== Achievements as a player ===
- 2× Greek Cup Winner: (1981, 1993)
- 3× Greek Cup Runner-up: (1978, 1980, 1988)

=== Achievements as an assistant coach ===
- 2× Greek League Champion: (1998, 1999)

== See also ==
- Players with the most points scored in the Amateur Greek Basketball Championship (1963–1992)
