= Balkan Basketball Championship 1975 =

The seventeenth Balkan Basketball Championship was held in 1975 in Bucharest, Romania. Four national teams from Balkan area took part in the competition. The championship was won by Yugoslavia.

== Results ==
19.09 Greece-Romania 78-83(32-38)
19.09 Yugoslavia-Bulgaria 101-76(52-36)
20.09 Greece-Yugoslavia 68-84(29-34)
20.09 Romania-Bulgaria 81-70(41-36)
21.09 Greece-Bulgaria 61-63(29-25)
21.09 Yugoslavia-Romania 99-88(47-47)

=== Final rankings ===
Position	Medal	Team	G	W	L	PF	PA	PD
1	Gold	Yugoslavia	3	3	0	284	232	+66
2	Silver	Bulgaria	3	2	1	252	247	+5
3	Bronze	Romania	3	1	2	209	243	-34
4		Greece	3	0	3	207	230	-23

== Sources ==
- Durupınar, Mehmet. Türk Basketbolunun 100 yıllık tarihi, (2009). Efes Pazarlama ve Dağıtım Ticaret A.Ş. ISBN 978-975-00995-1-9
- Milivoje Karalejić, Saša Jakovljević, Žarko Kandić, Vladimir Stanković, Milan Tasić, Ivica Mihajlović. Košarkaška enciklopedija 1946-2000 : muške reprezentacije (2001) ISBN 978-86-82989-03-5
- 100 χρόνια Μπάσκετ 1891-1991, Περιοδικό Τρίποντο, 1991
