= Sotiris Sakellariou =

Greek basketball player

Personal information
- Born: November 13, 1955 (age 71) Thessaloniki, Greece
- Listed height: 6 ft 0 in (1.83 m)
- Listed weight: 185 lb (84 kg)
- Position: Point guard

Career history
- 1971–1984: Iraklis
- 1984–1988: PAOK
Medals
Representing Greece
Men's basketball
Mediterranean Games
Gold medal – first place	1979 Yugoslavia

Sotiris Sakellariou (alternate spelling: Sotirios) (Greek: Σωτήρης Σακελλαρίου; born November 13, 1955) is a retired Greek professional basketball player.

== Professional career ==
Sakellariou played club basketball with the Greek club Iraklis, and PAOK. He made his debut in the top level Greek Basket League, in October 1971.

== National team career ==
Sakellariou was a member of the senior men's Greek national basketball team. With Greece's senior men's national team, he had 127 caps, and he scored 566 points (4.5 points per game). With Greece's senior men's team, he played at the EuroBasket 1975, the EuroBasket 1979, and the 1980 European Olympic Qualifying Tournament.

He won the gold medal at the 1979 Mediterranean Games.
