= Greece men's national basketball team =

Men's national basketball team representing Greece

Greece
- FIBA ranking: 13 (1 September 2026)
- Joined FIBA: 1932 (co-founders)
- FIBA zone: FIBA Europe
- National federation: Hellenic Basketball Federation
- Coach: Vassilis Spanoulis
- Nickname(s): Επίσημη Αγαπημένη (Official Beloved)

Olympic Games
- Appearances: 5
- Medals: None

FIBA World Cup
- Appearances: 9
- Medals: (silver) Silver: (2006)

EuroBasket
- Appearances: 30
- Medals: (gold) Gold: (1987, 2005); (silver) Silver: (1989); (bronze) Bronze: (1949, 2009, 2025)
- Retired numbers: 1 (4)
Home	Away

First international
- Turkey 49–12 Greece (Istanbul, Turkey; 24 June 1936)

Biggest win
- Greece 123–49 Canada (Athens, Greece; 17 August 2010)

Biggest defeat
- Czechoslovakia 116–71 Greece (Moscow, Soviet Union; 10 June 1965)
Medal record
FIBA World Cup
Silver medal – second place	2006 Japan
EuroBasket
Gold medal – first place	1987 Athens
Gold medal – first place	2005 Serbia and Montenegro
Silver medal – second place	1989 Yugoslavia
Bronze medal – third place	1949 Egypt
Bronze medal – third place	2009 Poland
Bronze medal – third place	2025 Latvia
Stanković Cup
Gold medal – first place	2006 China
Mediterranean Games
Gold medal – first place	1979 Split	Team
Silver medal – second place	1991 Athens	Team
Silver medal – second place	2001 Tunis	Team
Silver medal – second place	2005 Almeria	Team
Silver medal – second place	2009 Pescara	Team
Bronze medal – third place	1955 Barcelona	Team
Bronze medal – third place	1971 Izmir	Team
Bronze medal – third place	1987 Latakia	Team
Balkan Championship
Gold medal – first place	1979 Athens
Gold medal – first place	1986 Sofia
Silver medal – second place	1963 Athens
Silver medal – second place	1969 Thessaloniki
Silver medal – second place	1972 Sarajevo
Silver medal – second place	1983 Titov Vrbas
Bronze medal – third place	1964 Bucharest
Bronze medal – third place	1966 Sofia
Bronze medal – third place	1967 Skopje
Bronze medal – third place	1974 Thessaloniki
Bronze medal – third place	1976 Burgas
Bronze medal – third place	1977 Skopje
Bronze medal – third place	1980 Cluj-Napoca
Bronze medal – third place	1981 Sofia
Bronze medal – third place	1984 Athens
Bronze medal – third place	1985 Bucharest

The Greece men's national basketball team (Greek: Eθνική Oμάδα Καλαθοσφαίρισης Ελλάδος) represents Greece in international basketball. They are controlled by the Hellenic Basketball Federation, the governing body for basketball in Greece. Greece is currently ranked 13th in the FIBA World Ranking.

Greece have appeared nine times at the FIBA World Cup, with their best result coming in 2006 as runners-up, after beating the United States 101–95 in the tournament's semi-final. Greece have taken part in the EuroBasket 29 times, winning the tournament twice, while also coming away with one silver (1989), as well as three bronze medals (1949, 2009, 2025).

Some of the team's highlights at the competition were beating the Soviet Union 103–101 in the final in Athens to win their first title in 1987, and defeating Germany 78–62 in the final in 2005. Greece have competed five times at the Olympic Games, their best results being fifth place finishes on three occasions (1996, 2004, 2008).

Greece is the only national team in the world to have defeated the United States during Mike Krzyzewski's era (2005–2016), as the latter had an undefeated record both before and after the 2006 FIBA World Cup semi-final, all major competitions included.

== History ==
Greece national basketball team of 1987 logo

Basketball has a long tradition in Greece, as the country was one of the eight founding members of the International Basketball Federation, more commonly known by its French acronym FIBA, in 1932. However, the men's national team was considered as a second-class power in international basketball for several decades and came into prominence in the mid-1980s by winning the EuroBasket 1987. It was the first ever major international title won by a Greece national team in any sports. Basketball became extremely popular in the country and since then Greece has been placed in the high level on the basketball stage.

=== International debut and first successes ===
Greece was to take part in the EuroBasket 1935, the inaugural FIBA European Championship held in Geneva, but were not able to travel to Switzerland due to financial problems. Thus, Greece made their international debut fourteen years later in the EuroBasket 1949 in Cairo, Egypt. That tournament has been marked as the weakest in the history of the competition, as most of the leading European basketball nations at the time refused to travel by plane to Egypt. Greece entered the tournament as a newcomer and got through to make their first major success in their very first appearance in the competition, finishing in third place behind hosts Egypt and a strong side French team.

After their first international success, the Greeks participated in the next tournament at EuroBasket 1951, where they reached the semi-final round ending up eighth among the eighteen nations that participated. They also made their first appearance at the Summer Olympic Games, taking part in the Summer Olympic basketball tournament in 1952. They were narrowly eliminated in the preliminary phase, finishing at the bottom of the table along with other six teams and also bringing to an end the first period in the history of Greek basketball as they did not enter any major tournaments for the rest of the 1950s.

During the 1960s, the 1970s, and the first half of the 1980s, Greece appeared in most of the EuroBasket tournaments, with their best performances being 8th place in 1965 and 9th place in both 1979 and 1981. They did not qualify for the Summer Olympic Games or to the FIBA World Cup, but they did win two regional gold medals. They won the gold at the 1979 Mediterranean Games by beating Yugoslavia by a score of 85–74 in the final, and the 1979 Balkan Championship, again by beating Yugoslavia, 66–62.

=== Rise to the top level: European champions ===
The history of the national team was fairly pedestrian until the mid-1980s, when Greece arrived as a powerhouse in international basketball, spearheaded by elite players like Nikos Galis, Panagiotis Giannakis, Panagiotis Fasoulas and Fanis Christodoulou. The arrival began with their qualification to the 1986 FIBA World Cup, a first in their history. The national team went on to finish 10th among the twenty-four nations at the tournament, but it was a catalyst for the future.

The following year, Greece faced their biggest challenge, as the country hosted the EuroBasket 1987 with the national team entering the tournament with a formidable line-up. After advancing through the group stages, they eliminated Italy and Yugoslavia, both among the favorites to win the tournament, in the quarter-finals and the semi-finals respectively. In the final, Greece faced the defending champions and heavily favored Soviet Union. In front of 17,000 Greek fans at the Peace and Friendship Stadium, the hosts won the gold medal after a thrilling win 103–101 over the Soviets, with Nikos Galis scoring 40 points. It was the first time that the Greek national team won a major tournament in any sport, instantly making basketball the national sport while the national team became cherished throughout the country.

The European champions failed to qualify for the 1988 Summer Olympic Games for a first time in 36 years, despite a decent performance in the pre-Olympic tournament. At the EuroBasket 1989, the defending champions were under pressure to prove that they could repeat the level of excellence they displayed at their last EuroBasket appearance, and they did so in a convincing way. After they had advanced to the knockout stages, the Soviet Union stood in their way in the semi-finals, but Greece defeated them once again and reached the final. In contrast to 1989, this time Greece had to overcome Yugoslavia and the latter's home court advantage in Zagreb. Greece would take home the silver medal, repeating their feat from the previous tournament to at least finish in a medal position at EuroBasket, making it their third medal in their basketball history.

=== Not quite in the top three ===
In the 1990s there was a series of successful results for the national team, which was present in all major international tournaments every year except for the 1992 Summer Olympic Games. In the period between 1990 and 1998, Greece never fell below 6th place and usually ended up 4th. They also qualified for a second Olympic appearance in 1996, where the team finished in 5th place.

At the 1990 FIBA World Cup, the team would face a new challenge as they would have to compete without their leading scorer Nikos Galis who was injured, but performed better than four years ago and eventually placed 6th in the tournament. For the next two competitions in 1994 and 1998 Greece finished 4th. In 1994, the team reached the semi-finals but were eliminated by the United States and played for the third place against Croatia to which they lost and were placed 4th, a result that was considered to demonstrate the continued prominence of the team. In 1998, the tournament was held in Athens and the Greeks hoped to qualify for the final. Although in the semi-final they were eliminated by FR Yugoslavia in extra time, and their disappointment of missing the chance to reach the final led to an easy defeat to the United States in the bronze medal game, once more leaving Greece 4th.

At the EuroBasket 1991 Greece finished 5th and just out of reach at 4th place of the medal position in 1993, 1995 and 1997. Greece acted as host at the 1995 tournament, failing to repeat the triumph of 1987 when defeated in the semi-final by FR Yugoslavia, something that happened again in 1997, while hosts Germany had eliminated Greece in 1993.

The years 1999–2002 were marked by an obvious decline of Greece. The beginning of this era was the shocking 16th and last place of the team in the final standings of the EuroBasket 1999, having suffered three defeats in the preliminary round. Consequently, Greece was absent from the 2000 Summer Olympic Games. At the next European championship in 2001, the Greek team was placed 9th, thus failed to qualify for the 2002 FIBA World Cup.

=== European champions and FIBA World Cup runners-up ===
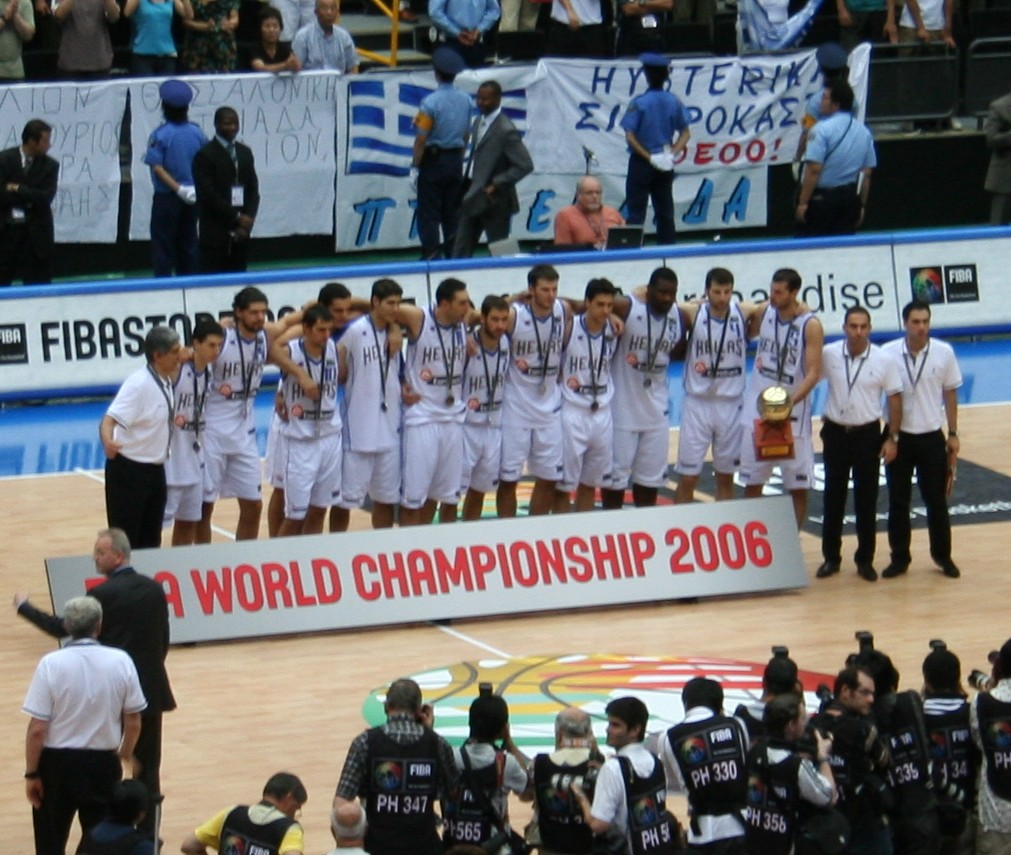
Greece won the silver medal at the 2006 FIBA World Cup after their memorable 101–95 win against USA.

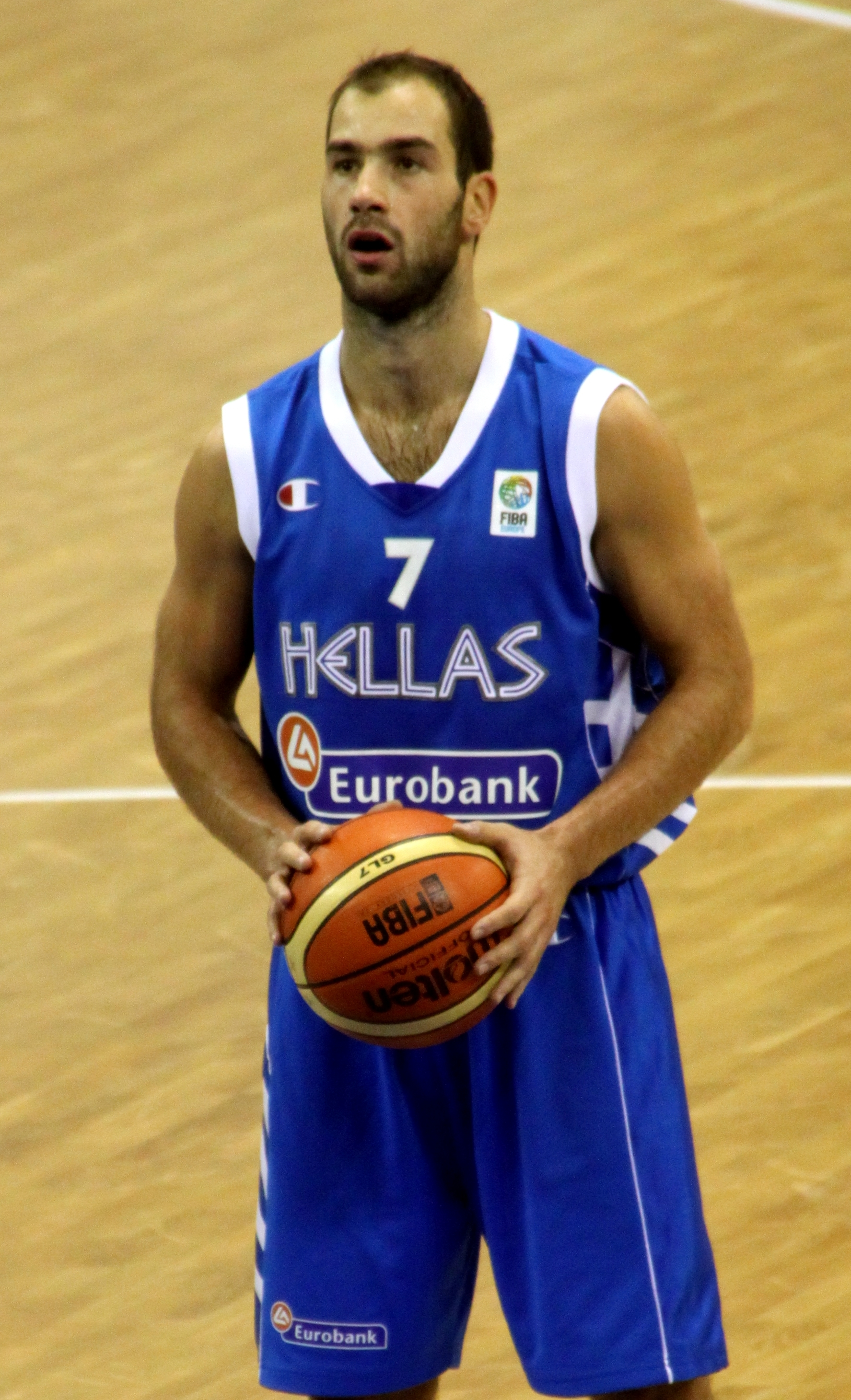
Vassilis Spanoulis

The revival of Greece started at the EuroBasket 2003, where an overhauled team finished 5th. The experiment was partly successful, but the public was not very enthusiastic. The 2004 Summer Olympic Games in Athens, were considered as the biggest chance for the hosts Greece to win their first Olympic medal. But in a close 69–64 loss to the eventual gold medalists Argentina in the quarter-finals, stopped any chance of it becoming reality. The team would go on to place 5th in the standings at the event overall.

Greece were considered a strong outsider for the medals at the EuroBasket 2005. They advanced from the group stage with two wins in three games and eliminated Israel and Russia to reach the semi-finals, where they faced France. The French side were leading the score by seven points with only one minute left, Greece appeared to have no chance to pull out the win and one more lost semi-final was coming. However, the Greeks managed to get within a two-point deficit and won 67–66 with a three-pointer by Dimitris Diamantidis with three seconds remaining, setting off a joyous celebration from the Greek side. In the final and in front of a raucous pro-Greece sold-out crowd of 20,000 at the Belgrade Arena, the Greeks defeated Germany in a convincing way 78–62, winning the gold medal for the second time in their history.

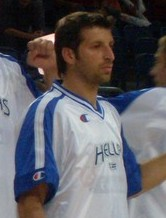
Thodoris Papaloukas

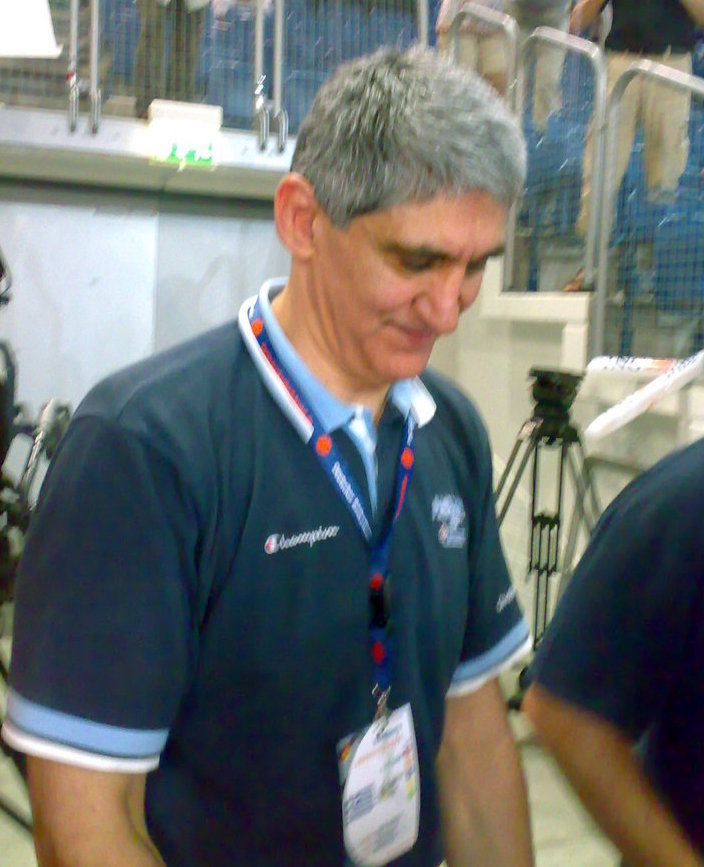
Greek basketball legend Panagiotis Giannakis is the only person to have won the EuroBasket both as a player (EuroBasket 1987) and as a head coach (EuroBasket 2005). He also led Greece to the final of the 2006 FIBA World Cup.

The following year, the European champions won the 2006 Stanković Cup going undefeated in the tournament and defeating Germany again in the final with an impressive 84–47 win. At the 2006 FIBA World Cup, Greece were determined to win a medal they had closely missed in their last two appearances in the tournament. They reached the semi-finals with a record of (7–0), with some of their wins coming in grand fashion. In the semi-finals, Greece defeated the popular odds-on United States in a 101–95 upset, rallying back from twelve points down, and qualified for the final. But, they ultimately ran out of gas from their dramatic game with the Americans and lost 70–47 to Spain, ending up with the silver medal. Despite the loss the players were greeted enthusiastically by celebrating fans on their return to Greece, due to their first ever medal in a World Cup and their victory over the United States.

At the EuroBasket 2007, the defending European champions advanced to the semi-finals where they faced the hosts and reigning World champions Spain, in a rematch of the final one year prior. Greece came close to take revenge but eventually lost 82–77, and played in the bronze medal game where they succumbed to Lithuania. At the 2008 Summer Olympic Games, another last-second defeat 80–78 to Argentina in the quarter-finals led Greece to a 5th-place finish once again. At the EuroBasket 2009, the national team was potently changed, with a bunch of young players and without key players Thodoris Papaloukas and Dimitris Diamantidis, as well as Panagiotis Vasilopoulos and Kostas Tsartsaris, the tournament was perceived as the turning point for Greece after their major recent achievements. However, after their fourth consecutive defeat to Spain in the semi-finals and sixty years after their first, and last, bronze medal they managed to take the podium in the third position against the odds, with a thrilling 57–56 win over Slovenia, ceasing the curse of being defeated in all bronze medal matches in their history.

Before the 2010 FIBA World Cup, the team exhibited impressive performances during friendly preparation matches, beating Germany 82–54, Russia 101–63, Croatia 90–81, Canada 123–49, Slovenia 96–72, and Serbia 74–73, in a game that ended up in a brawl. That brawl exposed problems within the team, which showed a different face in crucial matches in the World Cup. In the group stage, Greece lost to Turkey and Russia, (being accused of purposely losing the game with Russia, to avoid playing with Spain in the knock-out stage). France's loss to New Zealand meant that Greece had to face Spain anyway in the round of 16. The two teams met once more, in a dramatic game that Spain won in the last minutes (a game that lead to Greek complaints about critical referee calls). That loss meant that the Greek team was eliminated from the next stage, ending up 11th (its worst performance in a World Cup). That game led to the fifth consecutive Spanish victory over Greece in major international competitions (Greece would stop Spain's winning streak 3 years later at EuroBasket 2013, beating them 79–75, with Vassilis Spanoulis scoring 20 points). That actually represented a reversal of the previous situation, as Greece had previously defeated Spain in every game they played against each other at the four major international competitions (1990 FIBA World Cup, EuroBasket 1993, EuroBasket 1995, and the 1998 FIBA World Cup). After the elimination in the 2010 FIBA World Cup, Dimitris Diamantidis announced his retirement from the national team, at age 30.

=== 2011–present ===
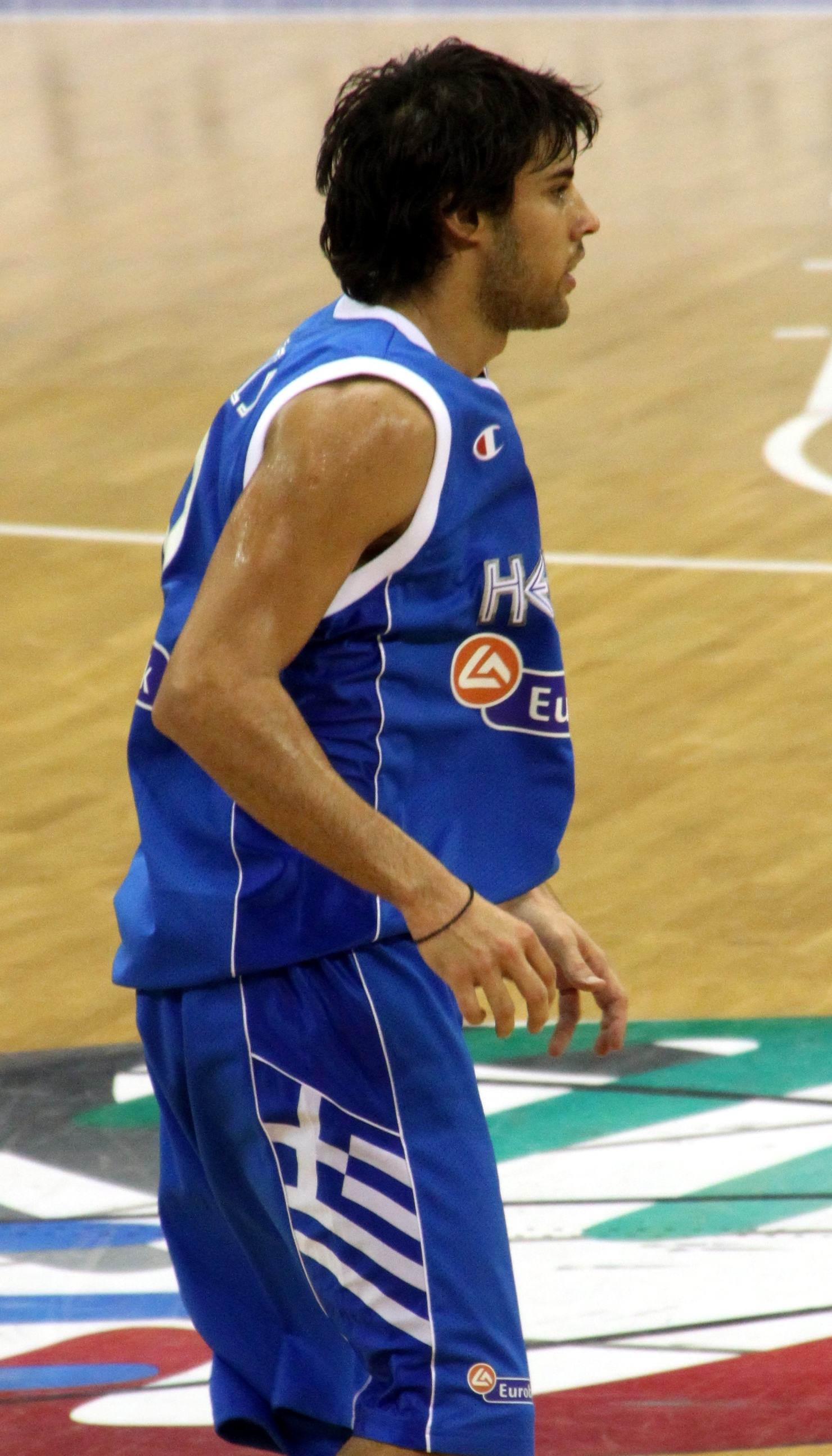
Georgios Printezis

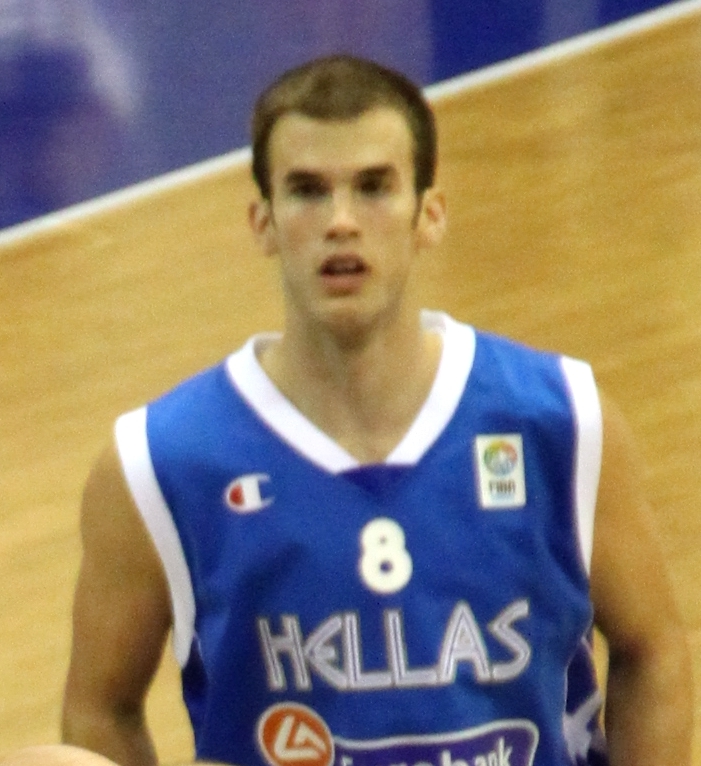
Nick Calathes

During preparations for EuroBasket 2011, new head coach, Ilias Zouros, faced one of the greatest challenges in the history of the Greek basketball team, with the absences of no less than 9 key players (including star players: Dimitris Diamantidis, Thodoris Papaloukas, Sofoklis Schortsanitis, and Vassilis Spanoulis). Zouros had to assemble a team mostly made of young players (half of the team's players had never participated in the EuroBasket, with little time to prepare. The new national team, featuring some of the next generation Greek players ("Generation X"), exhibited promising signs during friendlies, beating Russia 83–80, Germany 69–56, and Turkey 62–38. At the EuroBasket, Greece managed to reach the quarterfinals, where they lost to the eventual silver medalist France 64–56. Subsequently, the victory against Serbia 87–77, and the loss to Lithuania 73–69, led Greece to 6th place, thus securing participation in the 2012 FIBA World Olympic Qualifying Tournament. At the 2012 FIBA World Olympic Qualifying Tournament, Greece failed to qualify for the Olympics, after an 80–79 loss to Nigeria.

Participation at the EuroBasket 2013 with its new head coach, Andrea Trinchieri, didn't bring any consolation to its fans. The team once again exhibited superb performance during preparation games (including commanding victories against both eventual finalists France and Lithuania) earning the top spot on the FIBA EuroBasket power rankings before the tournament. Their start in the EuroBasket was equally fruitful, with comfortable victories against Sweden (79–51), Russia (80–71) and Turkey (84–61). However, serious injuries to (Spanoulis, Mavrokefalidis, Papanikolaou, Zisis) plagued the Greek team, despite the impressive win against the defending champions Spain. Losses in critical games (especially those against Italy and Finland in their preliminary phase group), led to the failure to reach the quarterfinals for the first time since the EuroBasket 2001. They were, however, selected as a wild card for the 2014 FIBA World Cup, being placed in Group B consisting of the Philippines, Senegal, Argentina, Croatia and rivals Puerto Rico.

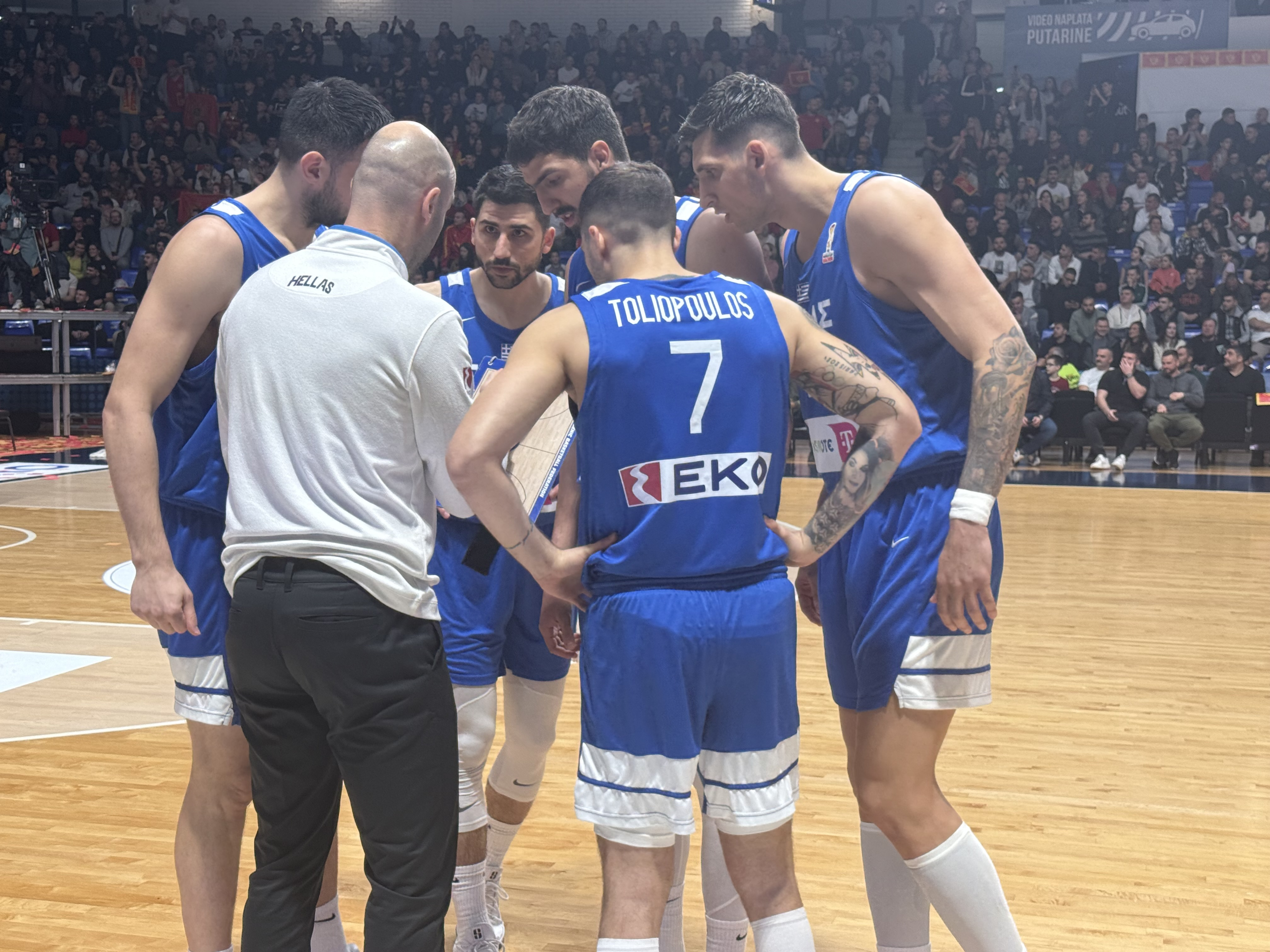
Vasilis Spanoulis calls a timeout in the game against Montenegro in the “Morača” arena.

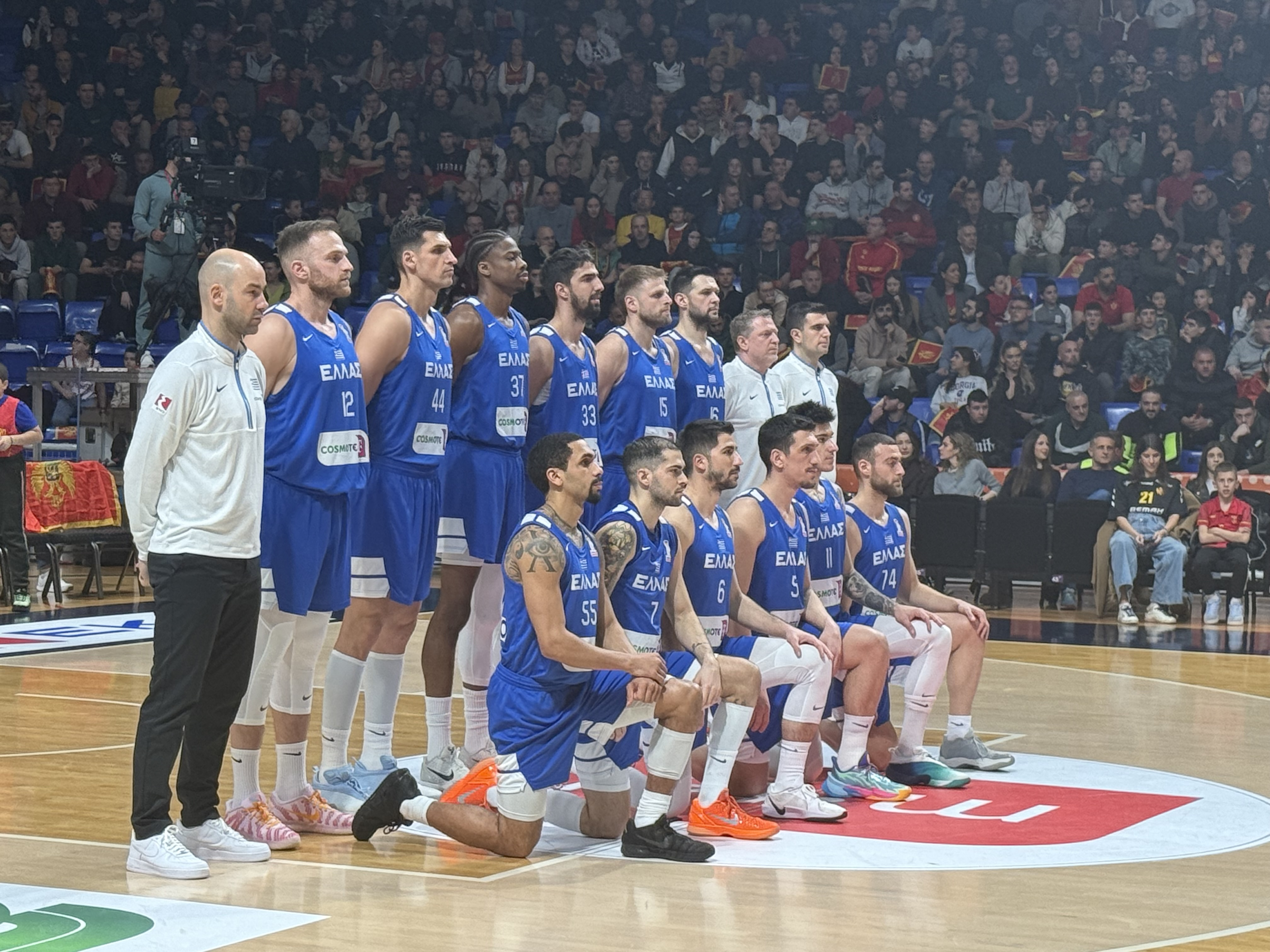
Greece national team in Podgorica for 2027 FIBA World Cup qualifier.

The national team once again introduced a new head coach in Fotios Katsikaris, and once more had to face what had become a chronic problem of missing key players (this time Vassilis Spanoulis, Kosta Koufos, Antonis Fotsis, Stratos Perperoglou and Sofoklis Schortsanitis). Greece ended up first in its group, after defeating all the above teams (being, along with USA and Spain, one of three undefeated teams in the Group Stage), but lost to Serbia in the Round of 16, and ended up in ninth place overall. Greece participated in EuroBasket 2015, in Group C consisting of Netherlands, Croatia, Slovenia, Georgia and rivals North Macedonia. The national team with Fotios Katsikaris as head coach, ended up first in its group, after defeating all the above nations (being, along with France and Serbia, one of three undefeated teams in the Group Stage). In the Round of 16, they defeated Belgium (75–54), but in the quarterfinals, they lost to Spain (73–71). Two days later (17 September 2015), they defeated Latvia (97–90), ending up in fifth place overall, and qualified to one of the three 2016 FIBA World Olympic Qualifying Tournaments. At the 2016 Turin FIBA World Olympic Qualifying Tournament, Greece defeated Iran (78–53), and Mexico (86–70), but lost to Croatia (66–61), and failed to qualify to the Summer Olympic Games, for the second time in a row. However, they qualified for EuroBasket 2017.

=== Giannis Antetokounmpo era ===
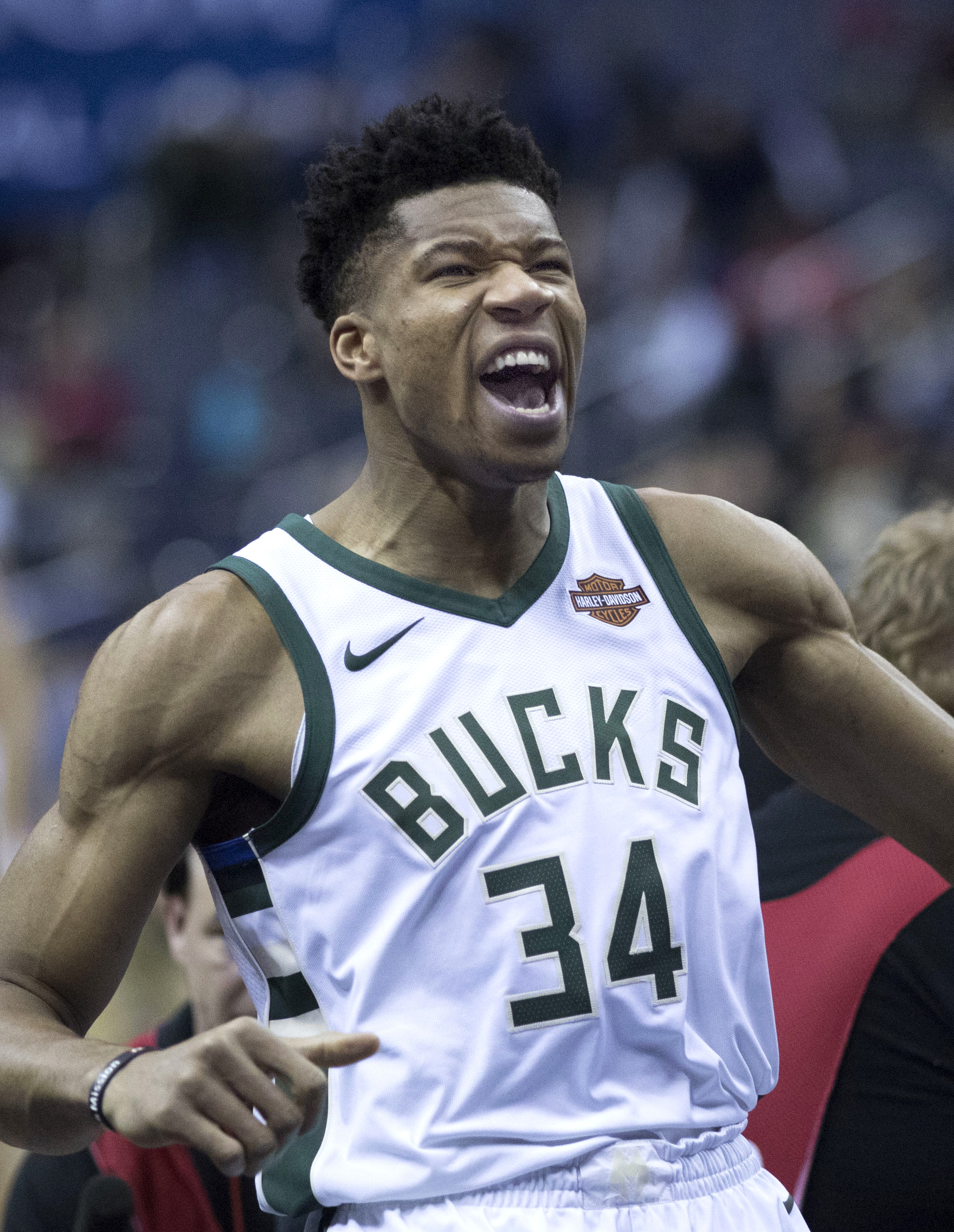
Giannis Antetokounmpo

In the late 2010s, Giannis Antetokounmpo became the face of the Greek national team, as the forward had major successes in the NBA, where he won two NBA MVP awards. Antetokounmpo joined the Greek national team for EuroBasket 2015. Greece's roster consisted of many experienced players, most of them previously crowned European champions with their clubs, like Vassilis Spanoulis, Ioannis Bourousis and Nikos Zisis, and Greece was a favorite for a medal, after showing great form in friendly games.At EuroBasket 2015, Greece was unbeaten in the group stages, and reached the quarter-finals, where a tight game ended in favor of the eventual champions, Spain, eventually finishing fifth with a 7–1 record. Antetokounmpo finished the tournament with three double-doubles, and a career-high 17 rebounds against Spain, leading his team in rebounds for the tournament. In eight games, he averaged 9.8 points, 6.9 rebounds and 1.1 assists per game.

Greece began their EuroBasket 2017 campaign with a victory against Iceland, but lost their next three games against Slovenia, France, and Finland. However, they defeated Poland, by a score of 95–77, to clinch a spot in the knockout rounds. In the round of 16 Greece had a dominant performance in defeating Lithuania, by the score of 77–64, and advanced to the quarterfinals. There, they were eliminated in a hard-fought battle against Russia 74–69.

Antetokounmpo represented Greece at the 2019 FIBA Basketball World Cup, where he became the first reigning NBA MVP to play in a World Cup. Greece finished 11th in the tournament after they failed to advance past the second round, which was regarded as a disappointing result in national and international sports media.

In September, Antetokounmpo played in the EuroBasket 2022 with Greece, his second of such tournament. On September 6, Antetokounmpo scored 41 points in a 99–79 group stage win over Ukraine. This was the twelfth-highest points tally of all time, and the most points scored in a EuroBasket game since Dirk Nowitzki in 2001. Greece was eliminated by Germany in the quarter-finals.

In the Paris Olympic Games, Greece was eliminated by Germany in the quarterfinals. It was the team's first participation in the Olympics after sixteen years.

Greece won its first medal in 16 years after winning the bronze medal at EuroBasket 2025. Antetokoumnpo was named to the All-Star Five of the tournament, as he was the second leading scorer with 27.3 points as well as 10.6 rebounds and 4.1 assists on average.

== Honours ==
=== Medals table ===
Games	Gold	Silver	Bronze	Total
FIBA World OQT	2	0	0	2
FIBA World Cup	0	1	0	1
Stanković World Cup	1	0	0	1
FIBA EuroBasket	2	1	3	6
Mediterranean Games	1	4	3	8
Balkan Championship	2	4	10	16
Total	8	10	16	34

=== Individual awards ===
- FIBA World Cup Top Scorer
  - Nikos Galis – 1986
- FIBA World Cup All-Tournament Team
  - Thodoris Papaloukas – 2006
- EuroBasket MVP
  - Nikos Galis – 1987
- EuroBasket Top Scorer
  - Georgios Kolokythas – 1967, 1969
  - Nikos Galis – 1983, 1987, 1989, 1991
  - Giannis Antetokounmpo – 2022
- EuroBasket All-Tournament Team
  - Nikos Galis – 1983, 1987, 1989, 1991
  - Panagiotis Fasoulas – 1987
  - Fanis Christodoulou – 1993, 1995
  - Dimitris Diamantidis – 2005
  - Thodoris Papaloukas – 2005
  - Vassilis Spanoulis – 2009
  - Giannis Antetokounmpo – 2022, 2025

== Competitive record ==
=== FIBA World Cup ===
World Cup					Qualification		
Year	Position	Pld	W	L	Pld	W	L
(Argentina) 1950	Did not enter				Did not enter		
(Brazil) 1954	Did not enter				Did not enter		
(Chile) 1959	Did not enter				Did not enter		
(Brazil) 1963	Did not qualify				EuroBasket served as qualifiers		
(Uruguay) 1967	Did not qualify				EuroBasket served as qualifiers		
(Socialist Federal Republic of Yugoslavia) 1970	Did not qualify				EuroBasket served as qualifiers		
(Puerto Rico) 1974	Did not qualify				EuroBasket served as qualifiers		
(Philippines) 1978	Did not qualify				EuroBasket served as qualifiers		
(Colombia) 1982	Did not qualify				EuroBasket served as qualifiers		
(Spain) 1986	10th	10	4	6	6	4	2
(Argentina) 1990	6th	8	4	4	EuroBasket served as qualifiers		
(Canada) 1994	4th	8	4	4	EuroBasket served as qualifiers		
(Greece) 1998	4th	9	5	4	Qualified as host		
(United States) 2002	Did not qualify				EuroBasket served as qualifiers		
(Japan) 2006	2nd place, silver medalist(s)	9	8	1	EuroBasket served as qualifiers		
(Turkey) 2010	11th	6	3	3	EuroBasket served as qualifiers		
(Spain) 2014	9th	6	5	1	EuroBasket served as qualifiers		
(China) 2019	11th	5	3	2	12	11	1
(Philippines) (Japan) (Indonesia) 2023	15th	5	2	3	10	6	4
(Qatar) 2027	To be determined				To be determined		
(France) 2031	To be determined				To be determined		
Total	9/19	66	38	28	28	21	7

=== Olympic Games ===
Olympic Games					Qualifying		
Year	Position	Pld	W	L	Pld	W	L
(Nazi Germany) 1936	Did not enter						
(United Kingdom) 1948	Did not enter						
(Finland) 1952	17th	3	1	2			
(Australia) 1956	Did not enter						
(Italy) 1960	Did not enter				Did not enter		
(Japan) 1964	Did not qualify				8	4	4
(Mexico) 1968	Did not qualify				8	3	5
(West Germany) 1972	Did not qualify				10	4	6
(Canada) 1976	Did not enter				Did not enter		
(Soviet Union) 1980	Did not qualify				4	2	2
(United States) 1984	Did not qualify				9	5	4
(South Korea) 1988	Did not qualify				9	6	3
(Spain) 1992	Did not qualify				5	3	2
(United States) 1996	5th	8	5	3	Directly qualified		
(Australia) 2000	Did not qualify				Did not qualify		
(Greece) 2004	5th	7	4	3	Qualified as host		
(China) 2008	5th	6	3	3	4	4	0
(United Kingdom) 2012	Did not qualify				3	2	1
(Brazil) 2016	Did not qualify				3	2	1
(Japan) 2020	Did not qualify				4	2	2
(France) 2024	8th	4	1	3	4	4	0
(United States) 2028	To be determined				To be determined		
Total	5/21	28	14	14	71	41	30

=== EuroBasket ===
EuroBasket					Qualification		
Year	Position	Pld	W	L	Pld	W	L
(Switzerland) 1935	Did not enter						
(Latvia) 1937	Did not enter						
(Lithuania) 1939	Did not enter						
(Switzerland) 1946	Did not enter						
(Czechoslovakia) 1947	Did not enter						
(Egypt) 1949	3rd place, bronze medalist(s)	6	4	2			
(France) 1951	8th	8	2	6			
(Soviet Union) 1953	Did not enter						
(Hungary) 1955	Did not enter						
(Bulgaria) 1957	Did not enter						
(Turkey) 1959	Did not enter						
(Socialist Federal Republic of Yugoslavia) 1961	17th	6	2	4			
(Poland) 1963	Did not enter				Did not enter		
(Soviet Union) 1965	8th	9	5	4	Directly qualified		
(Finland) 1967	12th	9	3	6	Directly qualified		
(Italy) 1969	10th	7	2	5	4	3	1
(West Germany) 1971	Did not qualify				4	1	3
(Spain) 1973	11th	7	2	5	10	8	2
(Socialist Federal Republic of Yugoslavia) 1975	12th	7	1	6	9	8	1
(Belgium) 1977	Did not qualify				5	2	3
(Italy) 1979	9th	8	4	4	8	5	3
(Czechoslovakia) 1981	9th	8	2	6	8	8	0
(France) 1983	11th	7	2	5	9	7	2
(West Germany) 1985	Did not qualify				5	2	3
(Greece) 1987	1st place, gold medalist(s)	8	6	2	Qualified as host		
(Socialist Federal Republic of Yugoslavia) 1989	2nd place, silver medalist(s)	5	3	2	6	6	0
(Italy) 1991	5th	5	3	2	6	5	1
(Germany) 1993	4th	9	5	4	6	5	1
(Greece) 1995	4th	9	5	4	Qualified as host		
(Spain) 1997	4th	9	7	2	10	9	1
(France) 1999	16th	3	0	3	10	7	3
(Turkey) 2001	9th	4	2	2	10	9	1
(Sweden) 2003	5th	6	5	1	10	9	1
(Serbia and Montenegro) 2005	1st place, gold medalist(s)	7	6	1	Directly qualified		
(Spain) 2007	4th	9	5	4	Directly qualified		
(Poland) 2009	3rd place, bronze medalist(s)	9	6	3	Directly qualified		
(Lithuania) 2011	6th	11	7	4	Directly qualified		
(Slovenia) 2013	11th	8	4	4	Directly qualified		
(France) (Croatia) (Germany) (Latvia) 2015	5th	8	7	1	Directly qualified		
(Finland) (Israel) (Romania) (Turkey) 2017	8th	7	3	4	Directly qualified		
(Czech Republic) (Georgia (country)) (Italy) (Germany) 2022	5th	7	6	1	6	4	2
(Cyprus) (Finland) (Poland) (Latvia) 2025	3rd place, bronze medalist(s)	9	7	2	6	5	1
(Estonia) (Greece) (Slovenia) (Spain) 2029	Qualified as co-host				Qualified as co-host		
Total	30/43	215	116	99	132	103	29

== Results and fixtures ==
Win Loss

=== 2025 ===
27 November 2025 2027 FIBA World Cup qualifiers – 1st round	Greece	91–64	Romania	Thessaloniki, Greece
18:30 (UTC+2)	Scoring by quarter: 26–12, 19–17, 23–15, 23–20
	Pts: Larentzakis 18; Rebs: Samodurov 7 Asts: Larentzakis, Mitrou-Long 6	Boxscore	Pts: Măciucă 13; Rebs: Cățe 8 Asts: Russell 8	Arena: Nick Galis Hall; Attendance: 4,675; Referees: Luis Castillo (ESP), Geert Jacobs (BEL), Siniša Prpa (SRB)

30 November 2025 2027 FIBA World Cup qualifiers – 1st round	Portugal	68–76	Greece	Matosinhos, Portugal
17:00 (UTC+0)	Scoring by quarter: 17–24, 19–13, 13–19, 19–20
	Pts: Williams 15; Rebs: C. Sá 8 Asts: Lisboa 4	Boxscore	Pts: Larentzakis 15; Rebs: Karagiannidis 7 Asts: Toliopoulos 5	Arena: Centro de Desportos e Congressos de Matosinhos; Attendance: 1,896; Referees: Wojciech Liszka (POL), Gintaras Mačiulis (LTU), Ritvars Helmšteins (LAT)

=== 2026 ===
27 February 2026 2027 FIBA World Cup qualifiers – 1st round	Greece	65–67	Montenegro	Athens, Greece
19:00 (UTC+2)	Scoring by quarter: 17–19, 21–21, 14–15, 13–12
	Pts: K. Antetokounmpo 13; Rebs: Papanikolaou 6 Asts: Mitrou-Long, Toliopoulos 4	Boxscore	Pts: Nikolić 19; Rebs: Hadžibegović, Simonović 7 Asts: Needham 6	Arena: SUNEL Arena; Attendance: 6,730; Referees: Antonio Conde (ESP), Andris Aunkrogers (LAT), Juozas Barkauskas (LTU)

2 March 2026 2027 FIBA World Cup qualifiers – 1st round	Montenegro	65–79	Greece	Podgorica, Montenegro
19:00 (UTC+1)	Scoring by quarter: 18–22, 17–22, 18–13, 12–22
	Pts: Drobnjak 14; Rebs: Drobnjak, Hadžibegović 6 Asts: Ivanović 4	Boxscore	Pts: Toliopoulos 27; Rebs: Mitoglou 8 Asts: Toliopoulos 10	Arena: Morača Sports Center; Attendance: 5,182; Referees: Gatis Saliņš (LAT), Lorenzo Baldini (ITA), Ventsislav Velikov (BUL)

2 July 2026 2027 FIBA World Cup qualifiers – 1st round	Romania	73–66	Greece	Oradea, Romania
19:00 (UTC+3)	Scoring by quarter: 16–18, 19–20, 16–20, 22–8
	Pts: Russell 20; Rebs: Uta 9 Asts: Tohătan 6	Boxscore	Pts: Larentzakis 16; Rebs: Papanikolaou 10; Asts: Papanikolaou, Toliopoulos 5	Arena: Oradea Arena; Attendance: 3,001; Referees: Martin Vulić (CRO), Edgard Ceccarelli (FRA), Branimir Galić (CRO)

5 July 2026 2027 FIBA World Cup qualifiers – 1st round	Greece	56–71	Portugal	Athens, Greece
19:30 (UTC+3)	Scoring by quarter: 15–19, 8–9, 19–25, 14–18
	Pts: Mitrou-Long 11; Rebs: Papanikolaou 7 Asts: Mitrou-Long 4	Boxscore	Pts: Brito 17; Rebs: Brito 9 Asts: Lisboa 5	Arena: SUNEL Arena; Attendance: 8,155; Referees: Ademir Zurapović (BIH), Alberto Sánchez (ESP), Valerio Grigion (ITA)

28 August 2026 2027 FIBA World Cup qualifiers – 2nd round	Ukraine	82–76	Greece	Riga, Latvia
19:00 (UTC+3)	Scoring by quarter: 24–19, 16–18, 24–22, 18–17
	Pts: Kovliar 18; Rebs: three players 6 Asts: three players 4	Boxscore	Pts: Calathes 17; Rebs: Mitoglou, Papanikolaou 6 Asts: Calathes 8	Arena: Xiaomi Arena; Attendance: 900; Referees: Boris Krejić (SVN), Péter Praksch (HUN), Ventsislav Velikov (BUL)

31 August 2026 2027 FIBA World Cup qualifiers – 2nd round	Greece	108–106(OT)	Spain	Athens, Greece
19:00 (UTC+3)	Scoring by quarter: 19–20, 24–22, 24–16, 19–28, Overtime: 22–20
	Pts: Dorsey, Mitoglou 29; Rebs: Mitoglou 7 Asts: Calathes 8	Boxscore	Pts: Parra 18; Rebs: Mara 13; Asts: Cárdenas 8	Arena: Telekom Center Athens; Attendance: 17,677; Referees: Wojciech Liszka (POL), Martin Vulić (CRO), Michał Proc (POL)

26 November 2026 2027 FIBA World Cup qualifiers – 2nd round	Greece	vs.	Georgia	Athens, Greece
20:00 (UTC+2)
		Boxscore		Arena: Telekom Center Athens

29 November 2026 2027 FIBA World Cup qualifiers – 2nd round	Spain	vs.	Greece	Santiago, Spain
18:00 (UTC+1)
		Boxscore		Arena: Pavillón Multiusos Fontes do Sar

=== 2027 ===
26 February 2027 2027 FIBA World Cup qualifiers – 2nd round	Greece	vs.	Ukraine	Greece
--:-- (UTC+2)
		Boxscore

1 March 2027 2027 FIBA World Cup qualifiers – 2nd round	Georgia	vs.	Greece	Georgia
--:-- (UTC+4)
		Boxscore

== Team ==
=== Current roster ===
Latest roster for the 2025 EuroBasket. A 19-player roster was announced on 22 July. On 29 July, Thanasis Antetokounmpo replaced Neoklis Avdalas. The final roster was announced on 24 August.

Greece men's national basketball team – EuroBasket 2025 roster
Players
Coaches

Pos.	No.	Name	Age – Date of birth	Height	Club	Ctr.
SG	2	Tyler Dorsey (N)	29 – 18 February 1996	1.95 m (6 ft 5 in)	Olympiacos	(Greece)
G	5	Giannoulis Larentzakis	31 – 22 September 1993	1.96 m (6 ft 5 in)	Olympiacos	(Greece)
G	7	Vassilis Toliopoulos	29 – 15 June 1996	1.88 m (6 ft 2 in)	Panathinaikos	(Greece)
G	10	Kostas Sloukas	35 – 15 January 1990	1.92 m (6 ft 4 in)	Panathinaikos	(Greece)
SF	11	Panagiotis Kalaitzakis	26 – 2 January 1999	1.98 m (6 ft 6 in)	Panathinaikos	(Greece)
SF	16	Kostas Papanikolaou (C)	35 – 31 July 1990	2.03 m (6 ft 8 in)	Olympiacos	(Greece)
PG	19	Dimitrios Katsivelis	33 – 1 October 1991	1.94 m (6 ft 4 in)	AEK Athens	(Greece)
PF	20	Alexandros Samodurov	20 – 20 April 2005	2.11 m (6 ft 11 in)	Panathinaikos	(Greece)
SF	34	Giannis Antetokounmpo	30 – 6 December 1994	2.11 m (6 ft 11 in)	Milwaukee Bucks	(United States)
C	37	Kostas Antetokounmpo	27 – 20 November 1997	2.09 m (6 ft 10 in)	Olympiacos	(Greece)
PF	43	Thanasis Antetokounmpo	33 – 18 July 1992	2.01 m (6 ft 7 in)	Milwaukee Bucks	(United States)
PF	44	Dinos Mitoglou	29 – 11 June 1996	2.10 m (6 ft 11 in)	Panathinaikos	(Greece)

Head coach

- (Greece) Vassilis Spanoulis

Assistant coach(es)

- (Greece) Kostas Charalampidis
- (Greece) Michail Kalavros
- (Greece) Diamantis Panagiotopoulos

Legend

- (C) Team captain
- (N) Naturalised player
- Club – describes last
  club before the tournament
- Age – describes age
  on 27 August 2025

=== Retired numbers ===
No.	Player	Position	Tenure	Date of retirement	Ref
4	Nikos Galis	SG	1980–1991	4 August 2023	

== Historical players ==
Player	Senior National Team	Position	Awards, honors and achievements
Georgios Kolokythas	(1962–1971)	(SG / SF / PF)	List of accomplishments: EuroLeague: European Selection Team (1970); National club competitions: 4× Greek League champion (1967, 1969, 1971, 1972); 3× Greek League Top Scorer (1964, 1966, 1967); FIBA: 2× FIBA EuroBasket Top Scorer (1967, 1969); European OQT Top Scorer (1968); FIBA's 50 Greatest Players (1991); FIBA Hall of Fame Candidate
Panagiotis Giannakis	(1976–1996)	(PG / SG)	List of accomplishments: 101 Greats of European Basketball (2018); FIBA Hall of Fame (2021); EuroLeague: EuroLeague champion (1996); 3× FIBA European Selection (1980, 1987, 1990); FIBA Balkans Selection: (1987); 50 Greatest EuroLeague Contributors (2008); Other European cups: FIBA Saporta Cup champion (1993); National club competitions: 7× Greek League champion (1985–1991); 7× Greek Cup winner (1985, 1987–1990, 1992, 1996); Greek League MVP (1987); Greek League Top Scorer (1980); 2× Greek Cup Final Top Scorer (1985, 1988); Greek 2nd Division champion (1975); Greek League Hall of Fame (2022); FIBA: 1987 EuroBasket Gold; 1989 EuroBasket Silver; Greek National Team's All-Time Leading Scorer; FIBA Europe's All-Time National Team Career Scoring Leader
Nikos Galis	(1980–1991)	(PG / SG)	List of accomplishments: ECAC Player of the Year (1979); Haggerty Award (1979); 3× Greek Athlete of the Year (1986, 1987, 1989); FIBA Balkans Selection: (1987); Mr. Europa Award (1987); Euroscar Award (1987); L'Équipe Champion of Champions' 10th Best Athlete in the World (1987); Seton Hall Athletic Hall of Fame (1991); FIBA's 50 Greatest Players (1991); FIBA Hall of Fame (2007); Basketball Hall of Fame (2017); 101 Greats of European Basketball: (2018); HoopsHype's 75 Greatest International Players Ever (2021); EuroLeague: FIBA European Selection (1987); 2× EuroLeague Top Scorer (1992, 1994); EuroLeague All-Final Four Team: (1994); 50 Greatest EuroLeague Contributors (2008); National club competitions: 8× Greek League champion (1983, 1985–1991); 7× Greek Cup winner (1985, 1987–1990, 1992, 1993); Greek Super Cup winner (1986); 5× Greek League MVP (1988–1992); 5× Greek League Finals MVP (1987–1991); 11× Greek League Top Scorer (1981–1991); 5× Greek Cup Finals Top Scorer (1987, 1989, 1990, 1992, 1993); Greek Super Cup Finals Top Scorer (1986); #6 retired by Aris (2013); Greek League Hall of Fame (2022); FIBA: 1987 EuroBasket Gold; 1989 EuroBasket Silver; EuroBasket MVP (1987); 4× EuroBasket Top Scorer (1983, 1987, 1989, 1991); 4× EuroBasket All-Tournament Team (1983, 1987, 1989, 1991); FIBA World Cup Top Scorer (1986); Number 4 jersey retired by the Greek national team (2023)
Panagiotis Fasoulas	(1981–1998)	(C)	List of accomplishments: EuroBasket 1987 champion; FIBA Hall of Fame induction (2016); EuroLeague champion (1997); FIBA Saporta Cup champion (1991); EuroBasket All-Tournament Team (1987); 3× FIBA European Selection (1990, 1991, 1995); FIBA EuroStar Selection (1996); 2× Greek League MVP (1994, 1995); Greek League Finals MVP (1992); Greek League Rebounding leader (1987)
Fanis Christodoulou	(1983–1997)	(SF / PF)	List of accomplishments: EuroBasket 1987 champion; 2× EuroBasket All-Tournament Team (1993, 1995); Greek League MVP (1993)
Nikos Oikonomou	(1991–2001)	(PF)	List of accomplishments: EuroLeague champion (1996); FIBA Club World Cup champion (1996); 4× FIBA EuroStar (1996–1999); Greek League Top Scorer (2005)
Georgios Sigalas	(1993–2003)	(SG / SF)	List of accomplishments: EuroLeague champion (1997); EuroLeague All-Final Four Team (1994); Greek League MVP (1996); 5× Greek League Finals MVP (1993–1997); FIBA European Selection (1995); FIBA EuroStar Selection (1996)
Fragiskos Alvertis	(1993–2004)	(SG / SF / PF)	List of accomplishments: 101 Greats of European Basketball: (2018); 5× EuroLeague champion (1996), (2000), (2002), (2007), (2009); FIBA Club World Cup champion (1996); 50 Greatest EuroLeague Contributors; EuroLeague All-Final Four Team (1996); Greek League MVP (2003); Greek Cup MVP (2003); 3× Greek All-Star Game 3 Point Shootout Contest Champion: (1996, 1997, 1998)
Thodoris Papaloukas	(2000–2008)	(PG / SG / SF)	List of accomplishments: 101 Greats of European Basketball: (2018); EuroBasket 2005 champion; 2× EuroLeague champion (2006, 2008); 50 Greatest EuroLeague Contributors; FIBA Europe Men's Player of the Year (2006); FIBA World Cup All-Tournament Team member (2006); EuroBasket All-Tournament Team member (2005); EuroLeague MVP (2007); EuroLeague Final Four MVP (2006); EuroLeague 2001–10 All-Decade Team (2010); EuroLeague Basketball Legend (2013); 2× All-EuroLeague First Team (2006, 2007); 2× All-EuroLeague Second Team (2008, 2009); 2× EuroLeague Assist leader (2007, 2009); 3× Russian League Player of the Year (2005, 2006, 2007); Russian Cup MVP (2006); 3× Greek League Assist leader (2001, 2002, 2009); All-Europe Player of the Year (2006)
Dimitris Diamantidis	(2001–2010)	(PG / SG / SF)	List of accomplishments: Mr. Europa Award (2007); All-Europe Player of the Year (2007); Greek Athlete of the Year (2007); 101 Greats of European Basketball: (2018); EuroLeague: 3× EuroLeague champion (2007, 2009, 2011); EuroLeague MVP (2011); 2× EuroLeague Final Four MVP (2007, 2011); 4× All-EuroLeague Team (2007, 2011–2013); 6× EuroLeague Best Defender (2005–2009, 2011); EuroLeague 2001–10 All-Decade Team (2010); EuroLeague Legend (2016); EuroLeague 2010–20 All-Decade Team (2020); EuroLeague Career Steals Leader; National club competitions: 9× Greek League champion (2005–2011, 2013, 2014); 10× Greek Cup winner (2005–2009, 2012–2016); 6× Greek League MVP (2004, 2006–2008, 2011, 2014); 6× Greek League Finals MVP (2006–2009, 2011, 2014); 2× Greek Cup MVP (2009, 2016); 2× Greek Cup Finals Top Scorer (2009, 2013); 3× Greek League Best Defender (2008, 2009, 2011); 11× Greek League Best Five (2004–2008, 2010–2014, 2016); 12× Greek League All-Star (2002–2011, 2013, 2014); Greek League Most Popular Player (2016); HEBA Greek League Career Steals Leader; #13 retired by Panathinaikos (2016); Greek League Hall of Fame (2022); FIBA: 2005 EuroBasket Gold; 2006 Stanković World Cup Gold; 2006 FIBA World Cup Silver; 2008 FIBA World OQT Gold; EuroBasket All-Tournament Team (2005); FIBA EuroBasket's Best 5 Players of the 2000–2020 era (2020)
Vassilis Spanoulis	(2001–2015)	(PG / SG)	List of accomplishments: Balkan Athlete of the Year (2009); 2× All-Europe Player of the Year (2012, 2013); International Sports Prize (World's Best Athlete) (2013); HoopsHype's 75 Greatest International Players Ever (2021); World Club Cup: FIBA Club World Cup champion (2013); FIBA Club World Cup MVP (2013); EuroLeague: 3× EuroLeague champion (2009, 2012, 2013); EuroLeague MVP (2013); 3× EuroLeague Final Four MVP (2009, 2012, 2013); EuroLeague Finals Top Scorer (2013); 8× All-EuroLeague Team (2006, 2009, 2011, 2012, 2013, 2014, 2015, 2018); The Most Clutch Player in EuroLeague History (2017); EuroLeague 2010–20 All-Decade Team (2020); EuroLeague 2010–20 Player of the Decade (2020); EuroLeague Legend (2022); EuroLeague All-Time Leading Scorer (2000–present); European Champions' Cup / EuroLeague All-Time Leading Scorer (1958–present); National club competitions: 7× Greek League champion (2006, 2008–2010, 2012, 2015, 2016); 4× Greek Cup winner (2006, 2008, 2009, 2011); 3× Greek League MVP (2009, 2012, 2016); 3× Greek League Finals MVP (2012, 2015, 2016); 10× Greek League Best Five: (2005, 2006, 2008, 2009, 2011–2013, 2015–2017); 10× Greek League All-Star (2005, 2006, 2008–2011, 2013, 2014, 2018, 2019); Greek League Best Young Player (2003); Greek League Most Improved Player (2004); 2× Greek League Most Popular Player (2015, 2017); Greek Cup Finals Top Scorer (2018); HEBA Greek League All-Time Leading Scorer; HEBA Greek League All-Time Assists Leader; Greek League Hall of Fame (2022); FIBA: 2005 EuroBasket Gold; 2006 Stanković World Cup Gold; 2006 FIBA World Cup Silver; 2008 FIBA World OQT Gold; 2009 EuroBasket Bronze; EuroBasket All-Tournament Team (2009); FIBA EuroBasket's Best 5 Players of the 2000–2020 era (2020); Summer Olympic Games' All-Time Top 25 Players (2020)
Giannis Antetokounmpo	(2014–present)	(PF)	List of accomplishments: Euroscar Player of the Year (2018); ESPY Best Male Athlete (2019); 2× Greek Athlete of the Year (2020, 2021); HoopsHype's 75 Greatest International Players Ever (2021); NBA: NBA Champion (2021); 2× NBA MVP (2019, 2020); NBA Finals MVP (2021); 9× All-NBA Team (2017–2025); 9× NBA All-Star (2017–2025); NBA All-Star Game MVP (2021); NBA Defensive Player of the Year (2020); 5× NBA All-Defensive Team (2017, 2019–2022); NBA Most Improved Player (2017); NBA All-Rookie Second Team (2014); NBA 75th Anniversary Team (2021); FIBA: EuroBasket Top Scorer (2022); 2× EuroBasket All-Tournament Team (2022, 2025); 2025 EuroBasket Bronze

== Historical head coaches ==
Head coach	Senior National Team	Awards, honors and achievements
Faidon Matthaiou	(1961–1965, 1969)	List of accomplishments: 2× FIBA European Selection (1970, 1973); Greek League champion (1976); 2× Greek Cup winner (1976, 1984)
Richard Dukeshire	(1971–1972, 1975–1980)	List of accomplishments: 1× Greek League champion (1975)
Kostas Mourouzis	(1972–1974)	List of accomplishments: 7× Greek League champion (1967, 1969, 1971, 1972, 1973, 1974, 1978); 2× Greek Cup winner (1977, 1978)
Giannis Ioannidis	(1981, 2003)	List of accomplishments: 12× Greek League champion (1979, 1983, 1985, 1986, 1987, 1988, 1989, 1990, 1993, 1994, 1995, 1996); 6× Greek Cup winner (1985, 1987, 1988, 1989, 1990, 1994)
Kostas Politis	(1983–1987)	List of accomplishments: EuroBasket 1987 Gold; 3× Greek League champion (1980, 1981, 1982); 2× Greek Cup winner (1979, 1982)
Efthimis Kioumourtzoglou	(1989–1993)	List of accomplishments: EuroBasket 1989 Silver
Makis Dendrinos	(1994–1996)	List of accomplishments: 1994 FIBA World Cup (4th place); 1996 Summer Olympic Games (5th place)
Panagiotis Giannakis	(1997–1998, 2004–2008)	List of accomplishments: 1998 FIBA World Cup (4th place); 2004 Summer Olympic Games (5th place); EuroBasket 2005 Gold; 2006 FIBA World Cup Silver; 2008 Summer Olympic Games (5th place); Greek Cup winner (2010); 2× Greek League Coach of the Year (2004, 2006)

== Past rosters ==
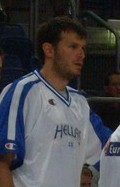
Antonis Fotsis

Dimitris Diamantidis

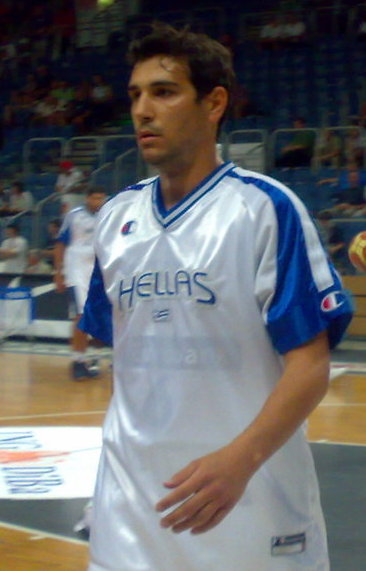
Nikos Zisis

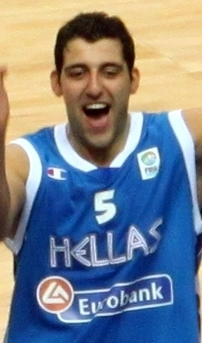
Ioannis Bourousis

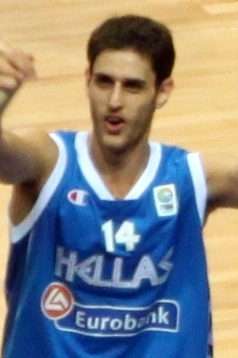
Stratos Perperoglou

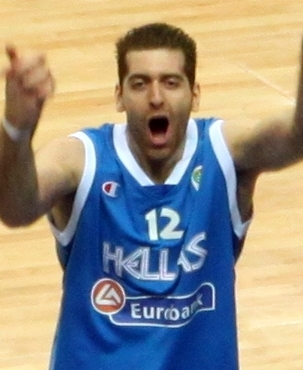
Kostas Kaimakoglou

1949 EuroBasket: finished (bronze) among 7 teams

3 Takis Taliadoros, 4 Sokratis Apostolidis, 5 Alekos Apostolidis, 6 Stelios Arvanitis, 7 Nikos Skylakakis, 8 Nikos Nomikos, 9 Nikos Milas, 10 Missas Pantazopoulos, 11 Alekos Spanoudakis, 12 Ioannis Lambrou, 21 Faidon Matthaiou, 22 Nikos Bournelos, 30 Thanasis Kostopoulos (Coach: Giorgos Karatzopoulos)

1951 EuroBasket: finished 8th among 17 teams

3 Faidon Matthaiou, 4 Nikos Milas, 5 Alekos Apostolidis, 6 Ioannis Lambrou, 7 Stelios Arvanitis, 8 Themis Cholevas, 9 Aristeidis Roubanis, 10 Mimis Stefanidis, 11 Panagiotis Manias, 13 Alekos Spanoudakis, 14 Ioannis Spanoudakis, 15 Takis Taliadoros (Coach: Vladimiros Vallas)

1952 Olympic Games: finished 17th among 23 teams

4 Faidon Matthaiou, 5 Nikos Milas, 6 Ioannis Lambrou, 7 Panagiotis Manias, 8 Aristeidis Roubanis, 9 Ioannis Spanoudakis, 10 Themis Cholevas, 11 Alekos Spanoudakis, 12 Kostas Papadimas, 13 Mimis Stefanidis, 14 Stelios Arvanitis, 15 Takis Taliadoros (Coach: Vladimiros Vallas)

1961 EuroBasket: finished 17th among 19 teams

4 Georgios Amerikanos, 5 Nikitas Aliprantis, 6 Antonis Christeas, 7 Georgios Oikonomou, 8 Alekos Kontovounisios, 9 Giannis Tsikas, 10 Giannis Bousios, 11 Nikos Chalas, 12 Kostas Mourouzis, 13 Stelios Gousios, 14 Dimitris Lekkas, 15 Kostas Politis (Coach: Faidon Matthaiou)

1965 EuroBasket: finished 8th among 16 teams

4 Kostas Politis, 5 Georgios Barlas, 6 Dimitris Lekkas, 7 Georgios Kolokythas, 8 Eas Larentzakis, 9 Takis Maglos, 10 Georgios Amerikanos, 11 Alekos Kontovounisios, 12 Petros Panagiotarakos, 13 Nikos Sismanidis, 14 Georgios Trontzos, 15 Andreas Chaikalis (Coach: Faidon Matthaiou)

1967 EuroBasket: finished 12th among 16 teams

4 Lakis Tsavas, 5 Georgios Barlas, 6 Kostas Politis, 7 Georgios Kolokythas, 8 Christos Zoupas, 9 Takis Maglos, 10 Vassilis Goumas, 11 Stratos Bazios, 12 Eas Larentzakis, 13 Kostas Diamantopoulos, 14 Georgios Trontzos, 15 Andreas Chaikalis (Coach: Missas Pantazopoulos)

1969 EuroBasket: finished 10th among 12 teams

4 Apostolos Spanos, 5 Georgios Barlas, 6 Georgios Trontzos, 7 Georgios Kolokythas, 8 Christos Zoupas, 9 Vassilis Goumas, 10 Kostas Diamantopoulos, 11 Andreas Chaikalis, 12 Nikos Sismanidis, 13 Thanasis Christoforou, 14 Makis Katsafados, 15 Thanasis Peppas (Coach: Faidon Matthaiou)

1973 EuroBasket: finished 11th among 12 teams

4 Apostolos Kontos, 5 Steve Giatzoglou, 6 Georgios Trontzos, 7 Michalis Giannouzakos, 8 Aris Raftopoulos, 9 Pavlos Stamelos, 10, Christos Kefalos, 11 Vassilis Goumas, 12 Nikos Sismanidis, 13 Georgios Kastrinakis, 14 Christos Iordanidis, 15 Charis Papageorgiou (Coach: Kostas Mourouzis)

1975 EuroBasket: finished 12th among 12 teams

4 Apostolos Kontos, 5 Vassilis Goumas, 6 Dimitris Kokolakis, 7 Michalis Giannouzakos, 8 Aris Raftopoulos, 9 Sotiris Sakellariou, 10 Takis Koroneos, 11 Steve Giatzoglou, 12 Charis Papageorgiou, 13 Georgios Kastrinakis, 14 Pavlos Diakoulas, 15 Dimitris Fosses (Coach: Vangelis Nikitopoulos)

1979 EuroBasket: finished 9th among 12 teams

4 Minas Gekos, 5 Vassilis Paramanidis, 6 Panagiotis Giannakis, 7 Michalis Giannouzakos, 8 Manthos Katsoulis, 9 Sotiris Sakellariou, 10 Takis Koroneos, 11 Steve Giatzoglou, 12 Charis Papageorgiou, 13 Georgios Kastrinakis, 14 Takis Karatzoulidis, 15 Dimitris Kokolakis (Coach: Richard Dukeshire)

1981 EuroBasket: finished 9th among 12 teams

4 Nikos Galis, 5 Liveris Andritsos, 6 Panagiotis Giannakis, 7 Kostas Petropoulos, 8 Manthos Katsoulis, 9 Kyriakos Vidas, 10 Takis Koroneos, 11 Asteris Zois, 12 Charis Papageorgiou, 13 Georgios Kastrinakis, 14 Takis Karatzoulidis, 15 Dimitris Kokolakis (Coach: Giannis Ioannidis)

1983 EuroBasket: finished 11th among 12 teams

4 Giannis Paragyios, 5 Albert Mallach, 6 Panagiotis Giannakis, 7 Nikos Galis, 8 Manthos Katsoulis, 9 Minas Gekos, 10 Michalis Romanidis, 11 Nikos Stavropoulos, 12 Liveris Andritsos, 13 Panagiotis Fasoulas, 14 Vangelis Alexandris, 15 Dimitris Kokolakis (Coach: Kostas Politis)

1986 FIBA World Cup: finished 10th among 24 teams

4 Nikos Galis, 5 Nikos Stavropoulos, 6 Panagiotis Giannakis (C), 7 Argiris Kambouris, 8 Argiris Pedoulakis, 9 Panagiotis Karatzas, 10 Michalis Romanidis, 11 Nikos Filippou, 12 Liveris Andritsos, 13 Fanis Christodoulou, 14 Dimitris Dimakopoulos, 15 Christos Christodoulou (Coach: Kostas Politis)

1987 EuroBasket: finished (gold) among 12 teams

4 Nikos Galis (MVP), 5 Nikos Stavropoulos, 6 Panagiotis Giannakis (C), 7 Argiris Kambouris, 8 Nikos Linardos, 9 Panagiotis Karatzas, 10 Michalis Romanidis, 11 Nikos Filippou, 12 Liveris Andritsos, 13 Panagiotis Fasoulas, 14 Memos Ioannou, 15 Fanis Christodoulou (Coach: Kostas Politis)

1989 EuroBasket: finished (silver) among 8 teams

4 Nikos Galis, 5 Kostas Patavoukas, 6 Panagiotis Giannakis (C), 7 Argiris Kambouris, 8 David Stergakos, 9 Dinos Angelidis, 10 John Korfas, 11 Nikos Filippou, 12 Liveris Andritsos, 13 Panagiotis Fasoulas, 14 Dimitris Papadopoulos, 15 Fanis Christodoulou (Coach: Efthimis Kioumourtzoglou)

1990 FIBA World Cup: finished 6th among 16 teams

4 Giorgos Gasparis, 5 Kostas Patavoukas, 6 Panagiotis Giannakis (C), 7 Argiris Kambouris, 8 David Stergakos, 9 Dimitris Papadopoulos, 10 Nasos Galakteros, 11 Vassilis Lipiridis, 12 Liveris Andritsos, 13 Panagiotis Fasoulas, 14 Memos Ioannou, 15 Fanis Christodoulou (Coach: Efthimis Kioumourtzoglou)

1991 EuroBasket: finished 5th among 8 teams

4 Nikos Galis, 5 Kostas Patavoukas, 6 Panagiotis Giannakis (C), 7 Argiris Kambouris, 8 Dinos Angelidis, 9 Ioannis Milonas, 10 Giorgos Gasparis, 11 Vassilis Lipiridis, 12 Liveris Andritsos, 13 Panagiotis Fasoulas, 14 Georgios Papadakos, 15 Dimitris Papadopoulos (Coach: Efthimis Kioumourtzoglou)

1993 EuroBasket: finished 4th among 16 teams

4 Georgios Bosganas, 5 Kostas Patavoukas, 6 Panagiotis Giannakis (C), 7 Lefteris Kakiousis, 8 Georgios Sigalas, 9 Efthimis Bakatsias, 10 Nasos Galakteros, 11 Christos Tsekos, 12 Giannis Papagiannis, 13 Panagiotis Fasoulas, 14 Nikos Oikonomou, 15 Fanis Christodoulou (Coach: Efthimis Kioumourtzoglou)

1994 FIBA World Cup: finished 4th among 16 teams

4 Panagiotis Giannakis (C), 5 Georgios Sigalas, 6 Nasos Galakteros, 7 Argiris Papapetrou, 8 Panagiotis Fasoulas, 9 Christos Tsekos, 10 Ioannis Milonas, 11 Efthimios Rentzias, 12 Efthimis Bakatsias, 13 Nikos Boudouris, 14 Fanis Christodoulou, 15 Kostas Patavoukas (Coach: Makis Dendrinos)

1995 EuroBasket: finished 4th among 14 teams

4 Efthimis Bakatsias, 5 Kostas Patavoukas, 6 Panagiotis Giannakis (C), 7 Tzanis Stavrakopoulos, 8 Georgios Sigalas, 9 Lefteris Kakiousis, 10 Fragiskos Alvertis, 11 Nikos Oikonomou, 12 Dinos Angelidis, 13 Panagiotis Fasoulas, 14 Efthimios Rentzias, 15 Fanis Christodoulou (Coach: Makis Dendrinos)

1996 Olympic Games: finished 5th among 12 teams

4 Efthimis Bakatsias, 5 Kostas Patavoukas, 6 Panagiotis Giannakis (C), 7 Dimitris Papanikolaou, 8 Georgios Sigalas, 9 Lefteris Kakiousis, 10 Fragiskos Alvertis, 11 Nikos Oikonomou, 12 Dinos Angelidis, 13 Panagiotis Fasoulas, 14 Efthimios Rentzias, 15 Fanis Christodoulou (Coach: Makis Dendrinos)

1997 EuroBasket: finished 4th among 16 teams

4 Georgios Kalaitzis, 5 Kostas Patavoukas, 6 Nikos Boudouris, 7 Dimitris Papanikolaou, 8 Georgios Sigalas, 9 Angelos Koronios, 10 Fragiskos Alvertis, 11 Nikos Oikonomou, 12 Christos Myriounis, 13 Ioannis Giannoulis, 14 Efthimios Rentzias, 15 Fanis Christodoulou (Coach: Panagiotis Giannakis)

1998 FIBA World Cup: finished 4th among 16 teams

4 Georgios Kalaitzis, 5 Georgios Balogiannis, 6 Nikos Boudouris, 7 Dimitris Papanikolaou, 8 Georgios Sigalas (C), 9 Angelos Koronios, 10 Fragiskos Alvertis, 11 Nikos Oikonomou, 12 Jake Tsakalidis, 13 Panagiotis Fasoulas, 14 Efthimios Rentzias, 15 Georgios Karagkoutis (Coach: Panagiotis Giannakis)

1999 EuroBasket: finished 16th among 16 teams

4 Georgios Kalaitzis, 5 Georgios Balogiannis, 6 Nikos Boudouris, 7 Dimitris Papanikolaou, 8 Georgios Sigalas (C), 9 Angelos Koronios, 10 Fragiskos Alvertis, 11 Vassilis Soulis, 12 Jake Tsakalidis, 13 Ioannis Giannoulis, 14 Michalis Kakiouzis, 15 Georgios Karagkoutis (Coach: Kostas Petropoulos)

2001 EuroBasket: finished 11th among 16 teams

4 Georgios Kalaitzis, 5 Nikos Chatzivrettas, 6 Thodoris Papaloukas, 7 Dimitris Papanikolaou, 8 Georgios Sigalas (C), 9 Antonis Fotsis, 10 Fragiskos Alvertis, 11 Dimos Dikoudis, 12 Michalis Kakiouzis, 13 Lazaros Papadopoulos, 14 Efthimios Rentzias, 15 Ioannis Giannoulis (Coach: Kostas Petropoulos)

2003 EuroBasket: finished 5th among 16 teams

4 Dimitris Diamantidis, 5 Nikos Chatzivrettas, 6 Thodoris Papaloukas, 7 Dimitris Papanikolaou, 8 Georgios Sigalas, 9 Antonis Fotsis, 10 Fragiskos Alvertis (C), 11 Dimos Dikoudis, 12 Jake Tsakalidis, 13 Christos Charissis, 14 Efthimios Rentzias, 15 Michalis Kakiouzis (Coach: Giannis Ioannidis)

2004 Olympic Games: finished 5th among 12 teams

4 Fragiskos Alvertis (C), 5 Thodoris Papaloukas, 6 Nikos Zisis, 7 Dimitris Papanikolaou, 8 Vassilis Spanoulis, 9 Antonis Fotsis, 10 Nikos Chatzivrettas, 11 Dimos Dikoudis, 12 Kostas Tsartsaris, 13 Dimitris Diamantidis, 14 Lazaros Papadopoulos, 15 Michalis Kakiouzis (Coach: Panagiotis Giannakis)

2005 EuroBasket: finished (gold) among 16 teams

4 Thodoris Papaloukas, 5 Vassilis Spanoulis, 6 Nikos Zisis, 7 Ioannis Bourousis, 8 Panagiotis Vasilopoulos, 9 Antonis Fotsis, 10 Nikos Chatzivrettas, 11 Dimos Dikoudis, 12 Kostas Tsartsaris, 13 Dimitris Diamantidis, 14 Lazaros Papadopoulos, 15 Michalis Kakiouzis (C) (Coach: Panagiotis Giannakis)

2006 FIBA World Cup: finished (silver) among 24 teams

4 Thodoris Papaloukas, 5 Sofoklis Schortsanitis, 6 Nikos Zisis, 7 Vassilis Spanoulis, 8 Panagiotis Vasilopoulos, 9 Antonis Fotsis, 10 Nikos Chatzivrettas, 11 Dimos Dikoudis, 12 Kostas Tsartsaris, 13 Dimitris Diamantidis, 14 Lazaros Papadopoulos, 15 Michalis Kakiouzis (C) (Coach: Panagiotis Giannakis)

2007 EuroBasket: finished 4th among 16 teams

4 Thodoris Papaloukas (C), 5 Ioannis Bourousis, 6 Nikos Zisis, 7 Vassilis Spanoulis, 8 Panagiotis Vasilopoulos, 9 Michalis Pelekanos, 10 Nikos Chatzivrettas, 11 Dimos Dikoudis, 12 Kostas Tsartsaris, 13 Dimitris Diamantidis, 14 Lazaros Papadopoulos, 15 Michalis Kakiouzis (Coach: Panagiotis Giannakis)

2008 Olympic Games: finished 5th among 12 teams

4 Thodoris Papaloukas (C), 5 Ioannis Bourousis, 6 Nikos Zisis, 7 Vassilis Spanoulis, 8 Panagiotis Vasilopoulos, 9 Antonis Fotsis, 10 Georgios Printezis, 11 Andreas Glyniadakis, 12 Kostas Tsartsaris, 13 Dimitris Diamantidis, 14 Sofoklis Schortsanitis, 15 Michalis Pelekanos (Coach: Panagiotis Giannakis)

2009 EuroBasket: finished (bronze) among 16 teams

4 Giannis Kalambokis, 5 Ioannis Bourousis, 6 Nikos Zisis, 7 Vassilis Spanoulis, 8 Nick Calathes, 9 Antonis Fotsis (C), 10 Georgios Printezis, 11 Andreas Glyniadakis, 12 Kostas Kaimakoglou, 13 Kosta Koufos, 14 Stratos Perperoglou, 15 Sofoklis Schortsanitis (Coach: Jonas Kazlauskas)

2010 FIBA World Cup: finished 11th among 24 teams

4 Ian Vougioukas, 5 Ioannis Bourousis, 6 Nikos Zisis, 7 Vassilis Spanoulis, 8 Nick Calathes, 9 Antonis Fotsis (C), 10 Georgios Printezis, 11 Stratos Perperoglou, 12 Kostas Tsartsaris, 13 Dimitris Diamantidis, 14 Kostas Kaimakoglou, 15 Sofoklis Schortsanitis (Coach: Jonas Kazlauskas)

2011 EuroBasket: finished 6th among 24 teams

4 Vassilis Xanthopoulos, 5 Ioannis Bourousis, 6 Nikos Zisis, 7 Kostas Vasileiadis, 8 Nick Calathes, 9 Antonis Fotsis (C), 10 Kostas Papanikolaou, 11 Dimitrios Mavroeidis, 12 Michael Bramos, 13 Kosta Koufos, 14 Kostas Sloukas, 15 Kostas Kaimakoglou (Coach: Ilias Zouros)

2013 EuroBasket: finished 11th among 24 teams

4 Kostas Sloukas, 5 Ioannis Bourousis, 6 Nikos Zisis, 7 Vassilis Spanoulis, 8 Stratos Perperoglou, 9 Antonis Fotsis (C), 10 Kostas Papanikolaou, 11 Vassilis Kavvadas, 12 Loukas Mavrokefalidis, 13 Kostas Kaimakoglou, 14 Michael Bramos, 15 Georgios Printezis (Coach: Andrea Trinchieri)

2014 FIBA World Cup: finished 9th among 24 teams

4 Vangelis Mantzaris, 5 Ioannis Bourousis, 6 Nikos Zisis (C), 7 Kostas Vasileiadis, 8 Nick Calathes, 9 Andreas Glyniadakis, 10 Kostas Papanikolaou, 11 Kostas Sloukas, 12 Kostas Kaimakoglou, 13 Giannis Antetokounmpo, 14 Ian Vougioukas, 15 Georgios Printezis (Coach: Fotios Katsikaris)

2015 EuroBasket: finished 5th among 24 teams

5 Ioannis Bourousis, 6 Nikos Zisis (C), 7 Vassilis Spanoulis, 8 Nick Calathes, 9 Stratos Perperoglou, 10 Kostas Sloukas, 12 Kostas Kaimakoglou, 13 Kosta Koufos, 15 Georgios Printezis, 16 Kostas Papanikolaou, 17 Vangelis Mantzaris, 34 Giannis Antetokounmpo (Coach: Fotios Katsikaris)

2017 EuroBasket: finished 8th among 24 teams

8 Nick Calathes, 9 Ioannis Bourousis (C), 10 Kostas Sloukas, 11 Nikos Pappas, 14 Georgios Papagiannis, 15 Georgios Printezis, 16 Kostas Papanikolaou, 17 Vangelis Mantzaris, 18 Dimitrios Agravanis, 19 Ioannis Papapetrou, 31 Georgios Bogris, 43 Thanasis Antetokounmpo (Coach: Kostas Missas)

2019 FIBA World Cup: finished 11th among 32 teams

5 Giannoulis Larentzakis, 8 Nick Calathes, 9 Ioannis Bourousis (C), 10 Kostas Sloukas, 14 Georgios Papagiannis, 15 Georgios Printezis, 16 Kostas Papanikolaou, 17 Vangelis Mantzaris, 19 Ioannis Papapetrou, 21 Panagiotis Vasilopoulos, 34 Giannis Antetokounmpo, 43 Thanasis Antetokounmpo (Coach: Thanasis Skourtopoulos)

2022 EuroBasket: finished 5th among 24 teams

2 Tyler Dorsey, 4 Michalis Lountzis, 5 Giannoulis Larentzakis, 7 Dimitrios Agravanis, 8 Nick Calathes, 10 Kostas Sloukas, 14 Georgios Papagiannis, 16 Kostas Papanikolaou (C), 19 Ioannis Papapetrou, 34 Giannis Antetokounmpo, 37 Kostas Antetokounmpo, 43 Thanasis Antetokounmpo (Coach: Dimitrios Itoudis)

2023 FIBA World Cup: finished 15th among 32 teams

0 Thomas Walkup, 1 Nikos Rogkavopoulos, 3 Michalis Lountzis, 5 Giannoulis Larentzakis, 6 Dimitrios Moraitis, 13 Lefteris Bochoridis, 14 Georgios Papagiannis, 16 Kostas Papanikolaou (C), 21 Ioannis Papapetrou, 43 Thanasis Antetokounmpo, 44 Dinos Mitoglou, 76 Manos Chatzidakis (Coach: Dimitrios Itoudis)

2024 Olympic Games: finished 8th among 12 teams

0 Thomas Walkup, 5 Giannoulis Larentzakis, 6 Dimitrios Moraitis, 7 Vassilis Toliopoulos, 8 Nick Calathes, 11 Panagiotis Kalaitzakis, 14 Georgios Papagiannis, 15 Vassilis Charalampopoulos, 16 Kostas Papanikolaou (C), 33 Nikos Chougkaz, 34 Giannis Antetokounmpo, 44 Dinos Mitoglou (Coach: Vassilis Spanoulis)

2025 EuroBasket: finished (bronze) among 24 teams

2 Tyler Dorsey, 5 Giannoulis Larentzakis, 7 Vassilis Toliopoulos, 10 Kostas Sloukas, 11 Panagiotis Kalaitzakis,
16 Kostas Papanikolaou (C), 19 Dimitrios Katsivelis, 20 Alexandros Samodurov, 34 Giannis Antetokounmpo, 37 Kostas Antetokounmpo, 43 Thanasis Antetokounmpo, 44 Dinos Mitoglou (Coach: Vassilis Spanoulis)

== Senior men's statistics ==
=== Senior men's players with 100+ career caps ===
- Note: Includes only games played that are classified as being games played under the category of Greek **senior men's** national basketball team games, as deemed by the Hellenic Basketball Federation.
- Players in **bold**, are players that are still active.

Players with the most caps (games played):

Rank	Player	Caps
1.	Panagiotis Giannakis	351
2.	Panagiotis Fasoulas	244
3.	Fanis Christodoulou	220
4.	Nikos Zisis	189
5.	Georgios Sigalas	185
6.	Antonis Fotsis	184
7.	Liveris Andritsos	182
8.	Dimitris Kokolakis	178
9.	Ioannis Bourousis	174
10.	**Kostas Papanikolaou**	172
11.	Nikos Galis	168
12.	Manthos Katsoulis	165
13.	Kostas Patavoukas	162
14.	Georgios Kastrinakis	158
15.	Fragiskos Alvertis	155
16.	Takis Koroneos	150
17.	**Nick Calathes**	149
18.	Michalis Giannouzakos	147
19.	Vassilis Spanoulis	146
20.	Georgios Trontzos	136
21.	**Kostas Sloukas**	132
22.	Dimitris Papanikolaou	131
23.	Thodoris Papaloukas	131
24.	Sotiris Sakellariou	127
25.	Efthimis Rentzias	127
26.	Georgios Printezis	127
27.	Argyris Kampouris	126
28.	Dimitris Diamantidis	125
29.	Nikos Philippou	124
30.	Kostas Tsartsaris	122
31.	Michalis Kakiouzis	116
32.	Nikos Chatzivrettas	116
33.	Steve Giatzoglou	115
34.	Vassilis Goumas	114
35.	Apostolos Kontos	114
36.	Dimos Dikoudis	114
37.	Nikos Oikonomou	109
38.	Angelos Koronios	105
39.	Lazaros Papadopoulos	104
40.	Takis Karatzoulidis	102
41.	Nikos Stavropoulos	102
42.	Nikos Boudouris	102

Last updated: 15 September 2025.

=== Senior men's 1,000+ points career scorers ===
- Note: Includes only games played that are classified as being games played under the category of Greek **senior men's** national basketball team games, as deemed by the Hellenic Basketball Federation.
- Players in **bold**, are players that are still active.

Rank	Player	Points scored	Caps	Points per game
1.	Panagiotis Giannakis	5,301	351	15.1
2.	Nikos Galis	5,129	168	30.5
3.	Panagiotis Fasoulas	2,384	244	9.8
4.	Fanis Christodoulou	2,269	220	10.3
5.	Takis Koroneos	1,832	150	12.2
6.	Georgios Kolokythas	1,807	90	20.1
7.	Antonis Fotsis	1,734	184	9.4
8.	Ioannis Bourousis	1,644	174	9.44
9.	Vassilis Goumas	1,641	114	14.4
10.	Georgios Kastrinakis	1,616	158	10.2
11.	Fragiskos Alvertis	1,605	155	10.4
12.	Georgios Trontzos	1,543	136	11.3
13.	Vassilis Spanoulis	1,494	146	10.2
14.	Georgios Sigalas	1,487	185	8.0
15.	Steve Giatzoglou	1,468	115	12.8
16.	Nikos Zisis	1,455	189	7.7
17.	Manthos Katsoulis	1,371	165	8.3
18.	**Giannis Antetokounmpo**	1,308	77	17.0
19.	Dimitris Kokolakis	1,280	178	7.2
20.	**Nick Calathes**	1,248	149	8.4
21.	Nikos Oikonomou	1,156	109	10.6
22.	**Kostas Papanikolaou**	1,139	172	6.6
23.	Georgios Printezis	1,127	127	8.9
24.	Apostolos Kontos	1,114	114	9.8
25.	Georgios Amerikanos	1,076	68	15.8
26.	Dimitris Papanikolaou	1,071	131	8.2
27.	Efthimis Rentzias	1,049	127	8.3

Last updated: 15 September 2025.

== Men's statistics ==
=== Men's 1,000 points career scorers ===
- Note: Includes all games played in age 18 and over competitions.
- Players in **bold**, are players that are still active.

Rank	Player	Points scored	Caps	Points per game
1.	Panagiotis Giannakis	6,291	403	15.6
2.	Nikos Galis	5,167	169	30.6
3.	Fanis Christodoulou	2,754	262	10.5
4.	Antonis Fotsis	2,699	258	10.5
5.	Panagiotis Fasoulas	2,538	261	9.7
6.	Nikos Oikonomou	2,511	191	13.1
7.	Vassilis Spanoulis	2,314	211	11.0
8.	Nikos Zisis	2,112	245	8.6
9.	Georgios Sigalas	1,923	235	8.2
10.	Georgios Kolokythas	1,910	94	20.3
11.	Fragiskos Alvertis	1,892	189	10.2
12.	Lazaros Papadopoulos	1,872	184	9.8
13.	Takis Koroneos	1,836	151	12.2
14.	**Kostas Sloukas**	1,748	208	8.4
15.	**Kostas Papanikolaou**	1,740	219	7.9
16.	Ioannis Bourousis	1,737	189	9.2
17.	Kostas Vasileiadis	1,734	122	14.2
18.	Vassilis Goumas	1,695	118	14.4
19.	Efthimis Rentzias	1,652	170	9.7
20.	Nasos Galakteros	1,645	136	12.1
21.	Georgios Kastrinakis	1,616	158	10.2
22.	Angelos Koronios	1,595	158	10.1
23.	Nikos Pappas	1,555	114	13.6
24.	Apostolos Kontos	1,547	141	11.0
25.	Georgios Trontzos	1,543	136	11.3
26.	Michalis Kakiouzis	1,521	166	9.2
27.	Dimitris Papanikolaou	1,514	164	9.2
28.	Steve Giatzoglou	1,468	115	12.8
29.	Manthos Katsoulis	1,364	165	8.3
30.	Georgios Printezis	1,358	159	8.5
31.	Dimos Dikoudis	1,319	144	9.2
32.	Dimitris Kokolakis	1,290	179	7.2
33.	**Nick Calathes**	1,281	149	8.6
34.	Charis Papageorgiou	1,269	105	13.1
35.	Liveris Andritsos	1,233	215	5.7
36.	Christos Myriounis	1,188	84	14.1
37.	Christos Tapoutos	1,153	91	12.7
38.	Nikos Philippou	1,110	143	7.8
39.	Michalis Giannouzakos	1,100	176	6.3
40.	Georgios Amerikanos	1,094	69	15.9
41.	Sotiris Sakellariou	1,080	176	6.1
42.	Dinos Angelidis	1,074	121	8.9
43.	Thodoris Papaloukas	1,073	150	7.2
44.	Dimitris Papanikolaou	1,071	131	8.2
45.	Stratos Perperoglou	1,054	124	8.5
46.	Efthimis Rentzias	1,049	127	8.3
47.	Kostas Petropoulos	1,037	101	10.3
48.	Kostas Patavoukas	1,012	191	5.3

Last updated: 25 January 2023.

== Team captains ==
Period	Captain
1981–1986	Dimitris Kokolakis
1986–1996	Panagiotis Giannakis
1996–1997	Fanis Christodoulou
1997–2003	Georgios Sigalas
2004	Fragiskos Alvertis
2005–2007	Michalis Kakiouzis
2007–2008	Thodoris Papaloukas
2008–2013	Antonis Fotsis
2013–2015	Nikos Zisis
2015–2019	Ioannis Bourousis
2020–2021	Georgios Printezis
2021–2022	Nick Calathes
2022–present	Kostas Papanikolaou

== Memorable wins ==
Date	Tournament	Place	Opponents	Score
15 May 1949	1949 EuroBasket	Cairo, Egypt	Netherlands	46 – 28
May 1949	1949 EuroBasket	Cairo, Egypt	Lebanon	45 – 36
May 1949	1949 EuroBasket	Cairo, Egypt	Turkey	54 – 41
May 1949	1949 EuroBasket	Cairo, Egypt	Syria	49 – 45
May 1951	1951 EuroBasket First round	Paris, France	Portugal	81 – 35
July 1952	1952 Olympic Games	Helsinki, Finland	Israel	54 – 52
24 May 1977	Friendly	Athens, Greece	United States	83 – 81
28 September 1979	Mediterranean Games 1979	Split, Yugoslavia	Yugoslavia	85 – 74
May 1981	1981 EuroBasket Challenge round	Istanbul, Turkey	Turkey	85 – 84
21 November 1985	1986 FIBA World Cup Challenge round	Piraeus, Greece	France	130 – 126
28 November 1985	1986 FIBA World Cup Challenge round	Piraeus, Greece	Bulgaria	111 – 81
5 July 1986	1986 FIBA World Cup Group stage	Zaragoza, Spain	Panama	110 – 81
6 July 1986	1986 FIBA World Cup Group stage	Zaragoza, Spain	France	87 – 84
18 July 1986	1986 FIBA World Cup	Madrid, Spain	Argentina	102 – 88
3 June 1987	1987 EuroBasket Group stage	Athens, Greece	Romania	109 – 77
4 June 1987	1987 EuroBasket Group stage	Athens, Greece	Yugoslavia	84 – 78
7 June 1987	1987 EuroBasket Group stage	Athens, Greece	France	82 – 69
10 June 1987	1987 EuroBasket Quarter-final	Athens, Greece	Italy	90 – 78
12 June 1987	1987 EuroBasket Semi-final	Athens, Greece	Yugoslavia	81 – 77
14 June 1987	1987 EuroBasket Final	Athens, Greece	Soviet Union	103 – 101 (OT)
21 June 1989	1989 EuroBasket Group stage	Zagreb, Croatia	France	80 – 74
24 June 1989	1989 EuroBasket Semi-final	Zagreb, Croatia	Soviet Union	81 – 80
9 August 1990	1990 FIBA World Cup 1st round	Villa Ballester, Argentina	Spain	102 – 93
14 August 1990	1990 FIBA World Cup 2nd round	Buenos Aires, Argentina	Brazil	103 – 88
17 August 1990	1990 FIBA World Cup	Buenos Aires, Argentina	Argentina	81 – 78
13 November 1991	1993 EuroBasket Qualifier Challenge Round	Budapest, Hungary	Hungary	85 – 73
20 November 1991	1993 EuroBasket Qualifier Challenge Round	Bucharest, Romania	Romania	82 – 73
22 June 1993	1993 EuroBasket Preliminary round	Karlsruhe, Germany	Latvia	81 – 62
24 June 1993	1993 EuroBasket Preliminary round	Karlsruhe, Germany	Italy	88 – 73
26 June 1993	1993 EuroBasket Second round	Karlsruhe, Germany	Bosnia and Herzegovina	102 – 84
28 June 1993	1993 EuroBasket Second round	Karlsruhe, Germany	Spain	76 – 75
1 July 1993	1993 EuroBasket Quarter-final	Munich, Germany	France	61 – 59
4 August 1994	1994 FIBA World Cup 1st round	Toronto, Canada	Germany	68 – 58
8 August 1994	1994 FIBA World Cup 2nd round	Toronto, Canada	Canada	74 – 71
23 June 1995	1995 EuroBasket Group stage	Athens, Greece	Italy	67 – 61
24 June 1995	1995 EuroBasket Group stage	Athens, Greece	Sweden	86 – 68
26 June 1995	1995 EuroBasket Group stage	Athens, Greece	Israel	59 – 49
27 June 1995	1995 EuroBasket Group stage	Athens, Greece	Germany	83 – 79
30 June 1995	1995 EuroBasket Quarter-final	Athens, Greece	Spain	66 – 64
2 August 1996	1996 Summer Olympics 5th place game	Atlanta, USA	Brazil	91 – 72
25 June 1997	1997 EuroBasket Group stage	Barcelona, Spain	Turkey	74 – 52
26 June 1997	1997 EuroBasket Group stage	Barcelona, Spain	Russia	74 – 72
27 June 1997	1997 EuroBasket Group stage	Barcelona, Spain	Bosnia and Herzegovina	78 – 76
29 June 1997	1997 EuroBasket Second round	Girona, Spain	Lithuania	73 – 66
30 June 1997	1997 EuroBasket Second round	Girona, Spain	France	80 – 71
1 July 1997	1997 EuroBasket Second round	Girona, Spain	Israel	85 – 82
4 July 1997	1997 EuroBasket Quarter-final	Barcelona, Spain	Poland	72 – 62
29 July 1998	1998 FIBA World Cup Group stage	Athens, Greece	Canada	78 – 72
30 July 1998	1998 FIBA World Cup Group stage	Athens, Greece	Italy	64 – 56
31 July 1998	1998 FIBA World Cup Group stage	Athens, Greece	Senegal	68 – 57
7 August 1998	1998 FIBA World Cup Quarter-final	Athens, Greece	Spain	69 – 62
31 August 2001	2001 EuroBasket Preliminary round	Antalya, Turkey	Italy	83 – 82
2 September 2001	2001 EuroBasket Preliminary round	Antalya, Turkey	Bosnia and Herzegovina	101 – 77
5 September 2003	2003 EuroBasket Group stage	Borås, Sweden	Croatia	77 – 76
6 September 2003	2003 EuroBasket Group stage	Borås, Sweden	Turkey	75 – 70
7 September 2003	2003 EuroBasket Group stage	Borås, Sweden	Ukraine	79 – 73
12 September 2003	2003 EuroBasket Fifth place match	Stockholm, Sweden	Serbia and Montenegro	72 – 64
15 August 2004	2004 Olympic Games Group stage	Athens, Greece	Australia	76 – 54
21 August 2004	2004 Olympic Games Group stage	Athens, Greece	Angola	88 – 56
23 August 2004	2004 Olympic Games Group stage	Athens, Greece	Puerto Rico	78 – 58
28 August 2004	2004 Olympic Games Fifth place match	Athens, Greece	Puerto Rico	85 – 75
16 September 2005	2005 EuroBasket Group stage	Belgrade, Serbia	France	64 – 50
18 September 2005	2005 EuroBasket Group stage	Belgrade, Serbia	Bosnia and Herzegovina	67 – 50
20 September 2005	2005 EuroBasket Play-off	Belgrade, Serbia	Israel	67 – 61
22 September 2005	2005 EuroBasket Quarter-final	Belgrade, Serbia	Russia	66 – 61
24 September 2005	2005 EuroBasket Semi-final	Belgrade, Serbia	France	67 – 66
25 September 2005	2005 EuroBasket Final	Belgrade, Serbia	Germany	78 – 62
19 August 2006	2006 FIBA World Cup Group stage	Hamamatsu, Japan	Qatar	84 – 64
20 August 2006	2006 FIBA World Cup Group stage	Hamamatsu, Japan	Lithuania	81 – 76 (OT)
22 August 2006	2006 FIBA World Cup Group stage	Hamamatsu, Japan	Australia	72 – 69
23 August 2006	2006 FIBA World Cup Group stage	Hamamatsu, Japan	Brazil	91 – 80
24 August 2006	2006 FIBA World Cup Group stage	Hamamatsu, Japan	Turkey	76 – 69
27 August 2006	2006 FIBA World Cup Round of 16	Saitama, Japan	China	95 – 64
30 August 2006	2006 FIBA World Cup Quarter-final	Saitama, Japan	France	73 – 56
1 September 2006	2006 FIBA World Cup Semi-final	Saitama, Japan	United States	101 – 95
4 September 2007	2007 EuroBasket Group stage	Granada, Spain	Serbia	68 – 67 (OT)
9 September 2007	2007 EuroBasket	Madrid, Spain	Croatia	81 – 78
14 September 2007	2007 EuroBasket Quarter-final	Madrid, Spain	Slovenia	63 – 62
18 September 2009	2009 EuroBasket	Katowice, Poland	Turkey	76 – 74 (OT)
20 September 2009	2009 EuroBasket Third place game	Katowice, Poland	Slovenia	57 – 56
17 August 2010	2010 Acropolis Tournament	Athens, Greece	Canada	123 – 49
19 August 2010	2010 Acropolis Tournament	Athens, Greece	Serbia	74 – 73
29 August 2010	2010 FIBA World Cup Group stage	Ankara, Turkey	Puerto Rico	83 – 80
1 September 2010	2010 FIBA World Cup Group stage	Ankara, Turkey	Ivory Coast	97 – 60
31 August 2011	2011 EuroBasket Group stage	Alytus, Lithuania	Bosnia and Herzegovina	76 – 67
1 September 2011	2011 EuroBasket Group stage	Alytus, Lithuania	Finland	81 – 61
5 September 2011	2011 EuroBasket Group stage	Alytus, Lithuania	Croatia	74 – 69
8 September 2011	2011 EuroBasket Second round	Vilnius, Lithuania	Slovenia	69 – 60
12 September 2011	2011 EuroBasket Second round	Alytus, Lithuania	Georgia	73 – 60
16 September 2011	2011 EuroBasket 5-8 place match	Kaunas, Lithuania	Serbia	87 – 77
5 September 2013	2013 EuroBasket Group stage	Koper, Slovenia	Russia	80 – 71
7 September 2013	2013 EuroBasket Group stage	Koper, Slovenia	Turkey	84 – 61
12 September 2013	2013 EuroBasket Second round	Ljubljana, Slovenia	Spain	79 – 75
30 August 2014	2014 FIBA World Cup Group stage	Seville, Spain	Senegal	87 – 64
31 August 2014	2014 FIBA World Cup Group stage	Seville, Spain	Philippines	82 – 70
1 September 2014	2014 FIBA World Cup Group stage	Seville, Spain	Puerto Rico	90 – 79
3 September 2014	2014 FIBA World Cup Group stage	Seville, Spain	Croatia	76 – 65
4 September 2014	2014 FIBA World Cup Group stage	Seville, Spain	Argentina	79 – 71
5 September 2015	2015 EuroBasket Group stage	Zagreb, Croatia	North Macedonia	85 – 65
6 September 2015	2015 EuroBasket Group stage	Zagreb, Croatia	Croatia	72 – 70
8 September 2015	2015 EuroBasket Group stage	Zagreb, Croatia	Georgia	79 – 68
9 September 2015	2015 EuroBasket Group stage	Zagreb, Croatia	Slovenia	83 – 72
10 September 2015	2015 EuroBasket Group stage	Zagreb, Croatia	Netherlands	68 – 65
12 September 2015	2015 EuroBasket Round of 16	Lille, France	Belgium	75 – 54
17 September 2015	2015 EuroBasket Olympic Qualifier	Lille, France	Latvia	97 – 90
7 August 2017	Friendly	Patras, Greece	Romania	106 – 48
6 September 2017	2017 EuroBasket Group stage	Helsinki, Finland	Poland	95 – 77
9 September 2017	2017 EuroBasket Round of 16	Istanbul, Turkey	Lithuania	77 – 64
24 November 2017	2019 FIBA World Cup Qualifier 1st round	Leicester, Great Britain	Great Britain	95 – 92 (OT)
27 November 2017	2019 FIBA World Cup Qualifier 1st round	Heraklion, Greece	Israel	82 – 61
23 Februar 2018	2019 FIBA World Cup Qualifier 1st round	Heraklion, Greece	Estonia	87 – 75
25 Februar 2018	2019 FIBA World Cup Qualifier 1st round	Heraklion, Greece	Great Britain	75 – 70
28 June 2018	2019 FIBA World Cup Qualifier 1st round	Tel Aviv, Israel	Israel	96 – 78
2 July 2018	2019 FIBA World Cup Qualifier 1st round	Tallinn, Estonia	Estonia	78 – 56
13 September 2018	2019 FIBA World Cup Qualifier 2nd round	Heraklion, Greece	Serbia	70 – 63
16 September 2018	2019 FIBA World Cup Qualifier 2nd round	Tbilisi, Georgia	Georgia	86 – 85
30 November 2018	2019 FIBA World Cup Qualifier 2nd round	Patras, Greece	Germany	92 – 84
21 February 2019	2019 FIBA World Cup Qualifier 2nd round	Heraklion, Greece	Georgia	81 – 69
24 February 2019	2019 FIBA World Cup Qualifier 2nd round	Bamberg, Germany	Germany	69 – 63
9 August 2019	Friendly	Heraklion, Greece	Hungary	83 – 59
11 August 2019	Friendly	Heraklion, Greece	Iran	88 – 58
1 September 2019	2019 FIBA World Cup 1st round	Nanjing, China	Montenegro	85 – 60
5 September 2019	2019 FIBA World Cup 1st round	Nanjing, China	New Zealand	103 – 97
9 September 2019	2019 FIBA World Cup 2nd round	Shenzhen, China	Czech Republic	84 – 77
24 February 2020	2022 EuroBasket Qualifier	Tuzla, Bosnia and Herzegovina	Bosnia and Herzegovina	70 – 65
29 November 2020	2022 EuroBasket Qualifier	Sarajevo, Bosnia and Herzegovina	Bulgaria	84 – 78 (OT)
22 February 2021	2022 EuroBasket Qualifier	Riga, Latvia	Latvia	97 – 94 (OT)
3 July 2021	2020 FIBA Olympic Qualifying Tournament	Victoria, Canada	Turkey	81 – 63
25 February 2022	2023 FIBA World Cup Qualifier 1st round	Athens, Greece	Turkey	72 – 71
28 February 2022	2023 FIBA World Cup Qualifier 1st round	Istanbul, Turkey	Turkey	76 – 67
30 June 2022	2023 FIBA World Cup Qualifier 1st round	Larissa, Greece	Great Britain	93 – 71
9 August 2022	Friendly	Athens, Greece	Spain	86 – 70
19 August 2022	2022 Acropolis Tournament	Athens, Greece	Turkey	89 – 80
2 September 2022	2022 EuroBasket Group stage	Milan, Italy	Croatia	89 – 85
3 September 2022	2022 EuroBasket Group stage	Milan, Italy	Italy	85 – 81
6 September 2022	2022 EuroBasket Group stage	Milan, Italy	Ukraine	99 – 79
8 September 2022	2022 EuroBasket Group stage	Milan, Italy	Estonia	90 – 69
11 September 2022	2022 EuroBasket Round of 16	Berlin, Germany	Czech Republic	94 – 88
14 November 2022	2023 FIBA World Cup Qualifier 2nd round	Mons, Belgium	Belgium	72 – 70
24 February 2023	2023 FIBA World Cup Qualifier 2nd round	Athens, Greece	Serbia	97 – 92 (OT)
2 August 2023	Friendly	Ljubljana, Slovenia	Slovenia	98 – 91
4 August 2023	Friendly	Athens, Greece	Slovenia	88 – 77
26 August 2023	2023 FIBA World Cup 1st round	Pasay, Philippines	Jordan	92 – 71
30 August 2023	2023 FIBA World Cup 1st round	Pasay, Philippines	New Zealand	83 – 74
23 February 2024	2025 EuroBasket Qualifier	Piraeus, Greece	Czech Republic	72 – 64
26 February 2024	2025 EuroBasket Qualifier	The Hague, Netherlands	Netherlands	74 – 72
25 June 2024	2024 Acropolis Tournament	Athens, Greece	Montenegro	86 – 57
27 June 2024	2024 Acropolis Tournament	Athens, Greece	Bahamas	102 – 75
3 July 2024	2024 FIBA Olympic Qualifying Tournament	Athens, Greece	Dominican Republic	109 – 82
4 July 2024	2024 FIBA Olympic Qualifying Tournament	Athens, Greece	Egypt	93 – 71
6 July 2024	2024 FIBA Olympic Qualifying Tournament	Athens, Greece	Slovenia	96 – 68
7 July 2024	2024 FIBA Olympic Qualifying Tournament	Athens, Greece	Croatia	80 – 69
16 July 2024	Friendly	Thessaloniki, Greece	Puerto Rico	67 – 65
2 August 2024	2024 Olympic Games Group stage	Lille, France	Australia	77 – 71
24 November 2024	2025 EuroBasket Qualifier	Thessaloniki, Greece	Great Britain	77 – 67
21 February 2025	2025 EuroBasket Qualifier	Pardubice, Czech Republic	Czech Republic	93 – 89 (OT)
24 February 2025	2025 EuroBasket Qualifier	Patras, Greece	Netherlands	63 – 53
20 August 2025	2025 Acropolis Tournament	Athens, Greece	Latvia	104 – 86
22 August 2025	2025 Acropolis Tournament	Athens, Greece	Italy	76 – 74
28 August 2025	2025 EuroBasket Group stage	Limassol, Cyprus	Italy	75 – 66
30 August 2025	2025 EuroBasket Group stage	Limassol, Cyprus	Cyprus	96 – 69
31 August 2025	2025 EuroBasket Group stage	Limassol, Cyprus	Georgia	94 – 53
4 September 2025	2025 EuroBasket Group stage	Limassol, Cyprus	Spain	90 – 86
7 September 2025	2025 EuroBasket Round of 16	Riga, Latvia	Israel	84 – 79
9 September 2025	2025 EuroBasket Quarter-final	Riga, Latvia	Lithuania	87 – 76
13 September 2025	2025 EuroBasket Third place game	Riga, Latvia	Finland	92 – 89
27 November 2025	2027 FIBA World Cup Qualifier 1st round	Thessaloniki, Greece	Romania	91 – 64
30 November 2025	2027 FIBA World Cup Qualifier 1st round	Matosinhos, Portugal	Portugal	76 – 68
2 March 2026	2027 FIBA World Cup Qualifier 1st round	Podgorica, Montenegro	Montenegro	79 – 65
22 August 2026	Friendly	Athens, Greece	Poland	89 – 81
24 August 2026	2026 Acropolis Tournament	Athens, Greece	Cyprus	82 – 75
31 August 2026	2027 FIBA World Cup Qualifier 2nd round	Athens, Greece	Spain	108 – 106 (OT)

== Kit Suppliers ==
Period	Kit supplier
1981–1988	ASICS
1989–1990	Adidas
1991–1995	Reebok
1996	Adidas
1997–2005	Nike
2006–2007	Champion
2008	Adidas
2009–2014	Champion
2015–2017	Spalding
2017–2019	GSA Sport
2020–present	Nike

== See also ==
- Sport in Greece
- Greece men's national under-20 basketball team
- Greece men's national under-19 basketball team
- Greece men's national under-18 basketball team
- Greece men's national under-17 basketball team
- Greece men's national under-16 basketball team
- Greece women's national basketball team
