= Efthimis Kioumourtzoglou =

Greek basketball coach

Personal information
- Born: September 28, 1952 (age 74) Greece

Career history

Coaching
- Panathinaikos Athens
- Panionios Athens
- PAOK Thessaloniki
- Aris Thessaloniki
- Iraklis Thessaloniki
Medals
Men's basketball
Representing Greece
(Head Coach)
FIBA EuroBasket
Silver medal – second place	1989 Yugoslavia
Mediterranean Games
Bronze medal – third place	1987 Syria	Under-26

Efthimis Kioumourtzoglou (Greek: Ευθύμης Κιουμουρτζόγλου; born September 28, 1952, in Thessaloniki, Greece) is a Greek former professional basketball coach.

== Club coaching career ==
Kioumourtzoglou was a head coach of five teams in Greece’s top-tier level Basket league. Kioumourtzoglou was a EuroLeague semifinalist, at the 1995 Zaragoza FIBA EuroLeague Final Four, where he led his team, Panathinaikos Athens, to a third-place finish. In 1996, he was a FIBA European Cup (FIBA Saporta Cup) finalist, while coaching the Greek club PAOK Thessaloniki. During his club coaching career, he was also the head coach of the Greek clubs Panionios Athens, Aris Thessaloniki, and Iraklis Thessaloniki.

== National team coaching career ==
With the senior Greek national team, Kioumourtzoglou was Kostas Politis' first assistant, on the Greek national team that won the gold medal at the 1987 EuroBasket. He took over as the head coach of the Greek national team, in October 1988. With Greece, he won the silver medal at the 1989 Zagreb EuroBasket, which was held at Zagreb, Croatia.

Kioumourtzoglou was also the head coach of the Greek national team that finished in sixth place at the 1990 FIBA World Championship, which took place in Argentina. Kioumourtzoglou continued to significantly contribute to establishing Greece's national team as being among the great powers of European basketball of the era, by leading them to a fifth place finish at the 1991 EuroBasket. He followed that up by leading Greece to a fourth place finish at the 1993 EuroBasket.

Kioumourtzoglou resigned from his position as the head coach of the Greek national team on July 30, 1994, shortly before the start of the 1994 FIBA World Championship, which took place in Toronto. He resigned from his position, after his efforts to maintain discipline in the team, following an incident with Greece's main center Panos Fasoulas. He was replaced as the team's head coach by his lead assistant, Makis Dendrinos, who led Greece to a fourth place finish at the tournament.

In total, Kioumourtzoglou coached the senior Greek national team in a total of 123 games.

== Academic career ==
Kioumourtzoglou is a Professor Emeritus, at the Democritus University of Thrace. He has also worked as a professor at the Aristotle University of Thessaloniki, and at the University of Nicosia, Cyprus. From 1988 to 2004, he was a director of the 2004 Athens Summer Olympic Games Organizing Committee. Kioumourtzoglou has published 135 scientific articles, as well as 9 books on basketball and motor learning.

== Greek national team ==
- 1987 Syria Mediterranean Games: Bronze
- 1989 Zagreb EuroBasket: Silver
- 1990 Argentina FIBA World Championship: 6th place
- 1991 Rome EuroBasket: 5th place
- 1993 Germany EuroBasket: 4th place
