= Kostas Patavoukas =

Greek basketball player

Personal information
- Born: February 3, 1966 (age 60) Athens, Greece
- Listed height: 1.91 m (6 ft 3 in)
- Listed weight: 92 kg (203 lb)

Career information
- Playing career: 1985–1999
- Position: Point guard / shooting guard

Career history
- 1985–1993: AEK Athens
- 1993–1996: Panathinaikos
- 1996–1997: Virtus Bologna
- 1997–1999: Panathinaikos

Career highlights
- EuroLeague champion (1996); Italian Cup winner (1997); 2× Greek League champion (1998, 1999); Greek Cup winner (1996); Greek League All-Star (1991)
Medals
Men's basketball
Representing Greece
EuroBasket
| Silver medal – second place | 1989 Yugoslavia |
Mediterranean Games
| Bronze medal – third place | 1987 Syria | Under-26 |

Konstantinos "Kostas" Patavoukas (alternate spelling: Constantinos "Costas") (Greek: Κώστας Παταβούκας) (born February 3, 1966) is a Greek retired professional basketball player.

== Professional career ==
Patavoukas started his playing career as a youth with Asteras Exarhion, and he later played professionally for the Greek Basket League club AEK Athens. With AEK Athens, Patavoukas was a 2 time Greek Cup finalist, in 1988 and 1992. He moved to the Greek club Panathinaikos, and with them he won the EuroLeague in 1996, in Paris, and 2 Greek League championships, in 1998 and 1999. After playing with Panathinaikos, he played with the Italian League club Virtus Bologna.

== National team career ==
Patavoukas was a member of the senior men's Greek national basketball team. With Greece's senior national team, he played at the following tournaments: the 1989 EuroBasket, the 1990 FIBA World Championship, the 1991 EuroBasket, the 1992 European Olympic Qualifying Tournament, the 1993 EuroBasket, the 1994 FIBA World Championship, the 1995 EuroBasket, the 1996 Summer Olympics, and the 1997 EuroBasket. In 1989, he was a silver medalist at the EuroBasket 1989, in Yugoslavia.

== Post-playing career ==
In July 2007, Patavoukas was appointed the technical director of Ionikos Lamias.
