= Makis Dendrinos =

Greek basketball player and coach

Personal information
- Born: May 27, 1950 Trikala, Greece
- Died: October 20, 2015 (aged 65) Greece
- Listed height: 5 ft 11 in (1.80 m)

Career information
- NBA draft: 1972: undrafted
- Playing career: 1968–1981
- Position: Point guard

Career history
- 1968–1981: Panionios

Career highlights
- As player: Greek 2nd Division champion (1974)

Gerasimos "Makis" Dendrinos (Greek: Γεράσιμος "Μάκης" Δενδρινός; 27 May 1950 – 20 October 2015) was a Greek professional basketball player and basketball coach. He was a 1.80 m (5 ft 11 in) tall point guard. His nickname as a player was "Buddha".

== Playing career ==
=== Club playing career ===
Dendrinos played club basketball with the Greek club Panionios, from 1968 to 1981. With Panionios, he won the Greek 2nd Division in 1974, and he played in the Greek Cup Final in 1977. He also played for several seasons in the 3rd-tier level European-wide league, the FIBA Korać Cup. In 216 games played with Panionios, he scored 4,049 points.

=== National team playing career ===
Dendrinos was also a member of the senior Greek national basketball team.

== Coaching career ==
=== Club coaching career ===
Dendrinos was the head coach of the Greek basketball clubs Pagrati, Olympiacos, Panionios, and Iraklis.

=== Greek national team ===
Dendrinos was the head coach of the senior men's Greek national basketball team from 1994 to 1996. As Greece's coach, he finished in 4th place at the 1994 FIBA World Championship, in the 4th place at 1995 EuroBasket, and in 5th place at the 1996 Summer Olympics.

== Death ==
On 20 October 2015, Dendrinos died at the age of 65.
