= Balkan Basketball Championship 1979 =

The twenty first 1979 Balkan basketball tournament was held in Athens, Greece. Five national teams from Balkan area took part in the competition.

== Medalists ==
Event	Gold	Silver	Bronze
Men	Greece	Yugoslavia	Turkey

== Results ==
14.09 Greece-Turkey 92-71(40-44)
14.09 Bulgaria-Romania 84-91(37-52)
15.09 Greece-Romania 71-64(44-24)
15.09 Turkey-Yugoslavia 62-88(36-41)
16.09 Turkey-Romania 75-72(34-32)
16.09 Bulgaria-Yugoslavia 64-87(36-47)
17.09 Greece-Bulgaria 64-62(34-31)
17.09 Romania-Yugoslavia 60-82(26-37)
18.09 Greece-Yugoslavia 66-62(26-35)
18.09 Turkey-Bulgaria 79-66(48-30)

== Final rankings ==
Position	Team	G	W	L	PF	PA	PD
1	Greece	4	4	0	293	259	+34
2	Yugoslavia	4	3	1	319	252	+67
3	Turkey	4	2	2	287	318	-31
4	Romania	4	1	3	287	312	-25
5	Bulgaria	4	0	4	276	321	-45

== Sources ==
- Durupınar, Mehmet. Türk Basketbolunun 100 yıllık tarihi, (2009). Efes Pazarlama ve Dağıtım Ticaret A.Ş. ISBN 978-975-00995-1-9
- Milivoje Karalejić, Saša Jakovljević, Žarko Kandić, Vladimir Stanković, Milan Tasić, Ivica Mihajlović. Košarkaška enciklopedija 1946-2000 : muške reprezentacije (2001) ISBN 978-86-82989-03-5
- 100 χρόνια Μπάσκετ 1891–1991, Περιοδικό Τρίποντο, 1991
