= Balkan Basketball Championship =

Sports championship

- Sport: Basketball
- Founded: 1959
- First season: 1959
- Folded: 1990
- No. of teams: 4 to 6
- Countries: Balkans nations

The Balkan Basketball Championship, sometimes referred to as the Balkan Basketball Cup or the Balkan Basketball Games, is the defunct competition that was the men's basketball competition added in 1959 to the Balkan Games that started in 1929. The purpose of the "Balkan Games" was to strengthen the relations between the nations of the Balkans region. The Balkan Games were a collection of athletics competitions added to the event over the years.

== History ==
The first men's basketball competition took place in Bucharest, in 1959. At the time, basketball was considered to be an important activity by the countries that competed in it. The best players from the Balkans region often competed at the tournament. Interest in the championship waned, and it was eventually cancelled. The last basketball tournament was held at Skopje, in 1990.

== Results ==
Year	Host City	Gold	Silver	Bronze	4th Place	5th Place	6th Place
1959	(Romania) Bucharest	Bulgaria	Yugoslavia	Romania	Albania	—	—
1960	(Bulgaria) Sofia	Bulgaria	Yugoslavia	Romania	Turkey	Albania	—
1961	(Socialist Federal Republic of Yugoslavia) Skopje	Yugoslavia	Bulgaria	Romania	Turkey	—	—
1962	(Turkey) Istanbul	Yugoslavia	Turkey	Bulgaria	Romania	Greece	—
1963	(Greece) Athens	Yugoslavia	Greece	Bulgaria	Romania	Turkey	—
1964	(Romania) Bucharest	Yugoslavia	Romania	Greece	Bulgaria	Turkey	—
1965	(Albania) Tirana	Yugoslavia	Bulgaria	Turkey	Romania	Albania	—
1966	(Bulgaria) Sofia	Yugoslavia	Romania	Greece	Bulgaria	Turkey	—
1967	(Socialist Federal Republic of Yugoslavia) Skopje	Yugoslavia	Bulgaria	Greece	Romania	Turkey	—
1968	(Turkey) İzmir	Yugoslavia	Romania	Turkey	Bulgaria	Greece	—
1969	(Greece) Thessaloniki	Yugoslavia	Greece	Romania	Bulgaria	Turkey	—
1970	(Romania) Bucharest	Yugoslavia	Bulgaria	Romania	Greece	—	—
1971	(Bulgaria) Vidin	Bulgaria	Yugoslavia	Turkey	Greece	Romania	—
1972	(Socialist Federal Republic of Yugoslavia) Sarajevo	Yugoslavia	Greece	Romania	Bulgaria	Turkey	—
1973	(Turkey) Istanbul	Yugoslavia	Bulgaria	Romania	Turkey	Greece	—
1974	(Greece) Thessaloniki	Yugoslavia	Bulgaria	Romania	Greece	—	—
1975	(Romania) Bucharest	Yugoslavia	Romania	Bulgaria	Greece	—	—
1976	(Bulgaria) Burgas	Yugoslavia	Bulgaria	Greece	Romania	—	—
1977	(Socialist Federal Republic of Yugoslavia) Skopje	Yugoslavia	Romania	Greece	Bulgaria	Turkey	—
1978	(Turkey) Ankara	Yugoslavia	Romania	Bulgaria	Greece	Turkey	—
1979	(Greece) Athens	Greece	Yugoslavia	Turkey	Romania	Bulgaria	—
1980	(Romania) Cluj-Napoca	Yugoslavia	Romania	Greece	Bulgaria	Turkey	—
1981	(Bulgaria) Sofia	Turkey	Bulgaria	Greece	Romania	Yugoslavia	—
1982	(Turkey) Istanbul	Yugoslavia	Turkey	Bulgaria	Romania	Greece	—
1983	(Socialist Federal Republic of Yugoslavia) Titov Vrbas	Yugoslavia	Greece	Turkey	Bulgaria	Romania	—
1984	(Greece) Athens	Bulgaria	Yugoslavia	Greece	Romania	—	—
1985	(Romania) Bucharest	Yugoslavia	Turkey	Greece	Romania	Bulgaria	—
1986	(Bulgaria) Sofia	Greece	Bulgaria	Romania	Yugoslavia	—	—
1988	(Turkey) Antalya	Yugoslavia	Bulgaria	Turkey	Greece	Romania	—
1990	(Socialist Federal Republic of Yugoslavia) Skopje	Yugoslavia	Romania	Bulgaria	Greece	Turkey	Albania

== Medals (1959-1990) ==
Rank	Nation	Gold	Silver	Bronze	Total
1	Yugoslavia	23	5	0	28
2	Bulgaria	4	10	6	20
3	Greece	2	4	9	15
4	Turkey	1	3	6	10
5	Romania	0	8	9	17
Totals (5 entries)		30	30	30	90

== Sources ==
- Athletic Echo Newspaper 14 September 1979 page 5 (in Greek)
