= Greece men's national basketball team past rosters =

The following is a history of the basketball players and head coaches that have competed for the Greece men's national basketball team, at all of the major international basketball tournaments.

== Summer Olympics, World Cup and EuroBasket ==
Year	EuroBasket	World Cup	Summer Olympics	Head Coach	Roster
1949	EuroBasket finished 3rd of 7 teams			Giorgos Karatzopoulos	Sokratis Apostolidis, Faidon Matthaiou, Alekos Apostolidis, Stelios Arvanitis, Thanasis Kostopoulos, Ioannis Lambrou, Nikos Nomikos, Missas Pantazopoulos, Nikos Skylakakis, Alekos Spanoudakis, Nikos Milas, Takis Taliadoros, Nikos Bournelos
1951	EuroBasket finished 8th of 17 teams			Vladimiros Vallas	Faidon Matthaiou, Nikos Milas, Alekos Apostolidis, Stelios Arvanitis, Ioannis Lambrou, Panos Manias, Aristeidis Roubanis, Ioannis Spanoudakis, Alekos Spanoudakis, Mimis Stefanidis, Takis Taliadoros, Themis Cholevas
1952			Olympic Games finished 17th of 23 teams	Vladimiros Vallas	Faidon Matthaiou, Nikos Milas, Ioannis Lambrou, Panos Manias, Aristeidis Roubanis, Ioannis Spanoudakis, Themis Cholevas, Alekos Spanoudakis, Dinos Papadimas, Mimis Stefanidis, Stelios Arvanitis, Takis Taliadoros
1961	EuroBasket finished 17th of 19 teams			Faidon Matthaiou	Georgios Amerikanos, Kostas Politis, Antonis Christeas, Kostas Mourouzis, Nikitas Aliprantis, Stelios Gousios, Giannis Tsikas, Georgios Oikonomou, Giannis Bousios, Alekos Kontovounisios, Nikos Chalas, Dimitris Lekkas
1965	EuroBasket finished 8th of 16 teams			Faidon Matthaiou	Georgios Kolokithas, Georgios Amerikanos, Georgios Trontzos, Kostas Politis, Eas Larentzakis, Andreas Chaikalis, Georgios Barlas, Petros Panagiotarakos, Dimitris Lekkas, Takis Maglos, Alekos Kontovounisios, Nikos Sismanidis
1967	EuroBasket finished 12th of 16 teams			Missas Pantazopoulos	Georgios Kolokithas, Georgios Trontzos, Christos Zoupas, Vassilis Goumas, Kostas Politis, Lakis Tsavas, Georgios Barlas, Takis Maglos, Stratos Bazios, Eas Larentzakis, Kostas Diamantopoulos, Andreas Chaikalis
1969	EuroBasket finished 10th of 12 teams			Faidon Matthaiou	Georgios Kolokithas, Christos Zoupas, Vassilis Goumas, Georgios Trontzos, Apostolos Spanos, Georgios Barlas, Thanasis Christoforou, Makis Katsafados, Thanasis Peppas, Nikos Sismanidis, Andreas Chaikalis, Kostas Diamantopoulos
1973	EuroBasket finished 11th of 12 teams			Kostas Mourouzis	Vassilis Goumas, Georgios Trontzos, Michalis Giannouzakos, Apostolos Kontos, Steve Giatzoglou, Aris Raftopoulos, Pavlos Stamelos, Christos Kefalos, Nikos Sismanidis, Georgios Kastrinakis, Christos Iordanidis, Charis Papageorgiou
1975	EuroBasket finished 12th of 12 teams			Vangelis Nikitopoulos	Vassilis Goumas, Apostolos Kontos, Dimitris Kokolakis, Michalis Giannouzakos, Aris Raftopoulos, Sotiris Sakellariou, Takis Koroneos, Steve Giatzoglou, Charis Papageorgiou, Georgios Kastrinakis, Pavlos Diakoulas, Dimitris Fosses
1979	EuroBasket finished 9th of 12 teams			Dick Dukeshire	Panagiotis Giannakis, Minas Gekos, Michalis Giannouzakos, Vassilis Paramanidis, Manthos Katsoulis, Sotiris Sakellariou, Takis Koroneos, Steve Giatzoglou, Charis Papageorgiou, Georgios Kastrinakis, Takis Karatzoulidis, Dimitris Kokolakis
1981	EuroBasket finished 9th of 12 teams			Giannis Ioannidis	Nikos Galis, Panagiotis Giannakis, Liveris Andritsos, Kostas Petropoulos, Manthos Katsoulis, Kyriakos Vidas, Takis Koroneos, Astirios Zois, Charis Papageorgiou, Georgios Kastrinakis, Takis Karatzoulidis, Dimitris Kokolakis
1983	EuroBasket finished 11th of 12 teams			Kostas Politis	Nikos Galis, Panagiotis Giannakis, Panagiotis Fasoulas, Michalis Romanidis, Minas Gekos, Vangelis Alexandris, Nikos Stavropoulos, Liveris Andritsos, Ioannis Paragyios, Albert Mallach, Manthos Katsoulis, Dimitris Kokolakis
1986		World Cup finished 10th of 24 teams		Kostas Politis	Nikos Galis, Panagiotis Giannakis, Fanis Christodoulou, Michalis Romanidis, Nikos Filippou, Liveris Andritsos, Nikos Stavropoulos, Argiris Kambouris, Argiris Pedoulakis, Panagiotis Karatzas, Dimitris Dimakopoulos, Christos Christodoulou
1987	EuroBasket finished 1st of 12 teams			Kostas Politis	Nikos Galis, Panagiotis Giannakis, Panagiotis Fasoulas, Fanis Christodoulou, Michalis Romanidis, Nikos Filippou, Nikos Stavropoulos, Argiris Kambouris, Memos Ioannou, Liveris Andritsos, Panagiotis Karatzas, Nikos Linardos
1989	EuroBasket finished 2nd of 8 teams			Efthimis Kioumourtzoglou	Nikos Galis, Panagiotis Giannakis, Panagiotis Fasoulas, Fanis Christodoulou, Nikos Filippou, Dinos Angelidis, Argiris Kambouris, Kostas Patavoukas, David Stergakos, Liveris Andritsos, Dimitris Papadopoulos, John Korfas
1990		World Cup finished 6th of 16 teams		Efthimis Kioumourtzoglou	Panagiotis Giannakis, Panagiotis Fasoulas, Fanis Christodoulou, Nasos Galakteros, Kostas Patavoukas, Vassilis Lipiridis, Memos Ioannou, Liveris Andritsos, Argiris Kambouris, David Stergakos, Dimitris Papadopoulos, Georgios Gasparis
1991	EuroBasket finished 5th of 8 teams			Efthimis Kioumourtzoglou	Nikos Galis, Panagiotis Giannakis, Panagiotis Fasoulas, Dinos Angelidis, Kostas Patavoukas, Argiris Kambouris, Vassilis Lipiridis, Liveris Andritsos, Ioannis Milonas, Georgios Gasparis, Georgios Papadakos, Dimitris Papadopoulos
1993	EuroBasket finished 4th of 16 teams			Efthimis Kioumourtzoglou	Panagiotis Giannakis, Panagiotis Fasoulas, Fanis Christodoulou, Georgios Sigalas, Lefteris Kakiousis, Nikos Oikonomou, Nasos Galakteros, Efthimis Bakatsias, Kostas Patavoukas, Christos Tsekos, Georgios Bosganas, Ioannis Papagiannis
1994		World Cup finished 4th of 16 teams		Makis Dendrinos	Panagiotis Giannakis, Fanis Christodoulou, Panagiotis Fasoulas, Georgios Sigalas, Nikos Boudouris, Efthimis Bakatsias, Kostas Patavoukas, Nasos Galakteros, Christos Tsekos, Efthimios Rentzias, Ioannis Milonas, Argiris Papapetrou
1995	EuroBasket finished 4th of 14 teams			Makis Dendrinos	Panagiotis Giannakis, Fanis Christodoulou, Fragiskos Alvertis, Nikos Oikonomou, Panagiotis Fasoulas, Georgios Sigalas, Lefteris Kakiousis, Dinos Angelidis, Efthimios Rentzias, Kostas Patavoukas, Efthimis Bakatsias, Tzanis Stavrakopoulos
1996			Olympic Games finished 5th of 12 teams	Makis Dendrinos	Fragiskos Alvertis, Nikos Oikonomou, Panagiotis Giannakis, Fanis Christodoulou, Panagiotis Fasoulas, Georgios Sigalas, Lefteris Kakiousis, Dinos Angelidis, Efthimios Rentzias, Efthimis Bakatsias, Kostas Patavoukas, Dimitris Papanikolaou
1997	EuroBasket finished 4th of 16 teams			Panagiotis Giannakis	Nikos Oikonomou, Georgios Sigalas, Fragiskos Alvertis, Fanis Christodoulou, Angelos Koronios, Efthimios Rentzias, Nikos Boudouris, Kostas Patavoukas, Georgios Kalaitzis, Dimitris Papanikolaou, Christos Myriounis, Ioannis Giannoulis
1998		World Cup finished 4th of 16 teams		Panagiotis Giannakis	Nikos Oikonomou, Fragiskos Alvertis, Georgios Sigalas, Efthimios Rentzias, Jake Tsakalidis, Panagiotis Fasoulas, Nikos Boudouris, Angelos Koronios, Georgios Kalaitzis, Georgios Balogiannis, Dimitris Papanikolaou, Georgios Karagkoutis
1999	EuroBasket finished 16th of 16 teams			Kostas Petropoulos	Georgios Sigalas, Fragiskos Alvertis, Michalis Kakiouzis, Jake Tsakalidis, Nikos Boudouris, Angelos Koronios, Ioannis Giannoulis, Georgios Kalaitzis, Georgios Balogiannis, Dimitris Papanikolaou, Vassilis Soulis, Georgios Karagkoutis
2001	EuroBasket finished 11th of 16 teams			Kostas Petropoulos	Thodoris Papaloukas, Dimitris Papanikolaou, Antonis Fotsis, Georgios Sigalas, Fragiskos Alvertis, Dimos Dikoudis, Michalis Kakiouzis, Efthimios Rentzias, Nikos Chatzivrettas, Ioannis Giannoulis, Georgios Kalaitzis, Lazaros Papadopoulos
2003	EuroBasket finished 5th of 16 teams			Giannis Ioannidis	Thodoris Papaloukas, Dimitris Diamantidis, Antonis Fotsis, Georgios Sigalas, Michalis Kakiouzis, Fragiskos Alvertis, Dimos Dikoudis, Efthimios Rentzias, Nikos Chatzivrettas, Dimitris Papanikolaou, Jake Tsakalidis, Christos Charissis
2004			Olympic Games finished 5th of 12 teams	Panagiotis Giannakis	Thodoris Papaloukas, Dimitris Diamantidis, Vassilis Spanoulis, Antonis Fotsis, Dimos Dikoudis, Michalis Kakiouzis, Lazaros Papadopoulos, Nikos Zisis, Kostas Tsartsaris, Nikos Chatzivrettas, Dimitris Papanikolaou, Fragiskos Alvertis
2005	EuroBasket finished 1st of 16 teams			Panagiotis Giannakis	Dimitris Diamantidis, Thodoris Papaloukas, Vassilis Spanoulis, Nikos Zisis, Lazaros Papadopoulos, Michalis Kakiouzis, Dimos Dikoudis, Antonis Fotsis, Kostas Tsartsaris, Nikos Chatzivrettas, Ioannis Bourousis, Panagiotis Vasilopoulos
2006		World Cup finished 2nd of 24 teams		Panagiotis Giannakis	Dimitris Diamantidis, Thodoris Papaloukas, Vassilis Spanoulis, Antonis Fotsis, Lazaros Papadopoulos, Sofoklis Schortsanitis, Nikos Zisis, Michalis Kakiouzis, Dimos Dikoudis, Kostas Tsartsaris, Nikos Chatzivrettas, Panagiotis Vasilopoulos
2007	EuroBasket finished 4th of 16 teams			Panagiotis Giannakis	Dimitris Diamantidis, Thodoris Papaloukas, Vassilis Spanoulis, Michalis Pelekanos, Lazaros Papadopoulos, Ioannis Bourousis, Nikos Zisis, Michalis Kakiouzis, Dimos Dikoudis, Kostas Tsartsaris, Nikos Chatzivrettas, Panagiotis Vasilopoulos
2008			Olympic Games finished 5th of 12 teams	Panagiotis Giannakis	Thodoris Papaloukas, Ioannis Bourousis, Nikos Zisis, Vassilis Spanoulis, Panagiotis Vasilopoulos, Antonis Fotsis, Georgios Printezis, Andreas Glyniadakis, Kostas Tsartsaris, Dimitris Diamantidis, Sofoklis Schortsanitis, Michalis Pelekanos
2009	EuroBasket finished 3rd of 16 teams			Jonas Kazlauskas	Vassilis Spanoulis, Antonis Fotsis, Ioannis Bourousis, Nikos Zisis, Sofoklis Schortsanitis, Stratos Perperoglou, Georgios Printezis, Nick Calathes, Kosta Koufos, Andreas Glyniadakis, Kostas Kaimakoglou, Giannis Kalambokis
2010		World Cup finished 11th of 24 teams		Jonas Kazlauskas	Dimitris Diamantidis, Vassilis Spanoulis, Antonis Fotsis, Ioannis Bourousis, Nikos Zisis, Sofoklis Schortsanitis, Stratos Perperoglou, Georgios Printezis, Nick Calathes, Kostas Kaimakoglou, Ian Vougioukas, Kostas Tsartsaris
2011	EuroBasket finished 6th of 24 teams			Ilias Zouros	Vassilis Xanthopoulos, Ioannis Bourousis, Nikos Zisis, Kostas Vasileiadis, Nick Calathes, Antonis Fotsis, Kostas Papanikolaou, Dimitrios Mavroeidis, Michael Bramos, Kosta Koufos, Kostas Sloukas, Kostas Kaimakoglou
2013	EuroBasket finished 11th of 24 teams			Andrea Trinchieri	Ioannis Bourousis, Antonis Fotsis, Nikos Zisis, Vassilis Spanoulis, Stratos Perperoglou, Vassilis Kavvadas, Michael Bramos, Kostas Papanikolaou, Kostas Kaimakoglou, Georgios Printezis, Loukas Mavrokefalidis, Kostas Sloukas
2014		World Cup finished 9th of 24 teams		Fotios Katsikaris	Georgios Printezis, Nick Calathes, Kostas Kaimakoglou, Ian Vougioukas, Nikos Zisis, Ioannis Bourousis, Vangelis Mantzaris, Kostas Vasileiadis, Andreas Glyniadakis, Kostas Sloukas, Giannis Antetokounmpo, Kostas Papanikolaou
2015	EuroBasket finished 5th of 24 teams			Fotios Katsikaris	Vassilis Spanoulis, Georgios Printezis, Nick Calathes, Kostas Kaimakoglou, Nikos Zisis, Ioannis Bourousis, Vangelis Mantzaris, Stratos Perperoglou, Kosta Koufos, Kostas Sloukas, Giannis Antetokounmpo, Kostas Papanikolaou
2017	EuroBasket finished 8th of 24 teams			Kostas Missas	Nick Calathes, Ioannis Bourousis, Kostas Sloukas, Nikos Pappas, Georgios Papagiannis, Georgios Printezis, Kostas Papanikolaou, Vangelis Mantzaris, Dimitrios Agravanis, Ioannis Papapetrou, Georgios Bogris, Thanasis Antetokounmpo
2019		World Cup finished 11th of 24 teams		Thanasis Skourtopoulos	Giannoulis Larentzakis, Nick Calathes, Ioannis Bourousis, Kostas Sloukas, Georgios Papagiannis, Georgios Printezis, Kostas Papanikolaou, Vangelis Mantzaris, Ioannis Papapetrou, Panagiotis Vasilopoulos, Giannis Antetokounmpo, Thanasis Antetokounmpo
2022	EuroBasket finished 5th of 24 teams			Dimitris Itoudis	Tyler Dorsey, Michalis Lountzis, Giannoulis Larentzakis, Dimitris Agravanis, Nick Calathes, Kostas Sloukas, Georgios Papagiannis, Kostas Papanikolaou, Ioannis Papapetrou, Giannis Antetokounmpo, Kostas Antetokounmpo, Thanasis Antetokounmpo
2024			Olympic Games: finished 8th among 12 teams	Vassilis Spanoulis	Thomas Walkup, Giannoulis Larentzakis, Dimitrios Moraitis, Vassilis Toliopoulos, Nick Calathes, Panagiotis Kalaitzakis, Georgios Papagiannis, Vassilis Charalampopoulos, Kostas Papanikolaou (C), Nikos Chougkaz, Giannis Antetokounmpo, Dinos Mitoglou

== FIBA Olympic qualifying tournament ==
1960 FIBA World Olympic Qualifying Tournament: finished 10th of 18 teams (Did not qualify for 1960 Summer Olympics)

Kostas Mourouzis, Ioannis Spanoudakis, Ioannis Tsikas, Panos Koukopoulos, Alekos Kontovounisios, Nikos Poulakidas, Thanasis Stalios, Georgios Amerikanos, Georgios Oikonomou, Asterios Goussios, Antonis Christeas, Petros Petrakis (Head Coach: Feidon Mattaiou)

1964 FIBA European Olympic Qualifying Tournament: finished 8th of 17 teams (Did not qualify for 1964 Summer Olympics)

Thanasis Peppas, Georgios Kolokithas, Antonis Christeas, Eas Larentzakis, Petros Panagiotarakos, Kostas Politis, Georgios Amerikanos, Alekos Kontovounisios, Stergios Bousvaros, Georgios Trontzos, Stelios Vasileiadis, Georgios Oikonomou (Head Coach: Feidon Mattaiou)

1968 FIBA European Olympic Qualifying Tournament: finished 9th of 12 teams (Did not qualify for 1968 Summer Olympics)

Lakis Tsavas, Georgios Barlas, Georgios Trontzos, Georgios Kolokithas, Nikos Sismanidis, Eas Larentzakis, Kostas Diamantopoulos, Kostas Parisis, Petros Panagiotarakos, Andreas Chaikalis, Makis Katsafados, Vassilis Goumas (Head Coach: Feidon Mattaiou)

1972 FIBA World Olympic Qualifying Tournament: finished 10th of 12 teams (Did not qualify for 1972 Summer Olympics)

Apostolos Kontos, Vassilis Goumas, Vassilis Nidriotis, Michalis Giannouzakos, Aris Raftopoulos, Nikos Nesiadis, Takis Koroneos, Thanasis Christoforou, Nikos Sismanidis, Vangelis Alexandris, Christos Iordanidis, Makis Katsafados (Head Coach: Dick Dukeshire)

1980 FIBA European Olympic Qualifying Tournament: finished 9th of 19 teams (Did not qualify for 1980 Summer Olympics)

Kyriakos Vidas, Vassilis Paramanidis, Panagiotis Giannakis, Kostas Petropoulos, Manthos Katsoulis, Sotiris Sakellariou, Nikos Galis, Astirios Zois, Charis Papageorgiou, Takis Karatzoulidis, Dimitris Kokolakis (Head Coach: Dick Dukeshire)

1984 FIBA European Olympic Qualifying Tournament: finished 5th of 8 teams (Did not qualify for 1984 Summer Olympics)

Nikos Galis, Argiris Papapetrou, Panagiotis Giannakis, Manthos Katsoulis, Michalis Romanidis, Kyriakos Vidas, Kostas Missas, Nikos Filippou, Liveris Andritsos, Panagiotis Fasoulas, Takis Karatzoulidis, Nikos Stavropoulos (Head Coach: Kostas Politis)

1988 FIBA European Olympic Qualifying Tournament: finished 5th of 8 teams (Did not qualify for 1988 Summer Olympics)

Nikos Galis, Efthimis Bakatsias, Panagiotis Giannakis, Argiris Kambouris, David Stergakos, Georgios Makaras, Dimitris Papadopoulos, Nikos Filippou, Liveris Andritsos, Panagiotis Fasoulas, Memos Ioannou, Fanis Christodoulou (Head Coach: Kostas Politis)

1992 FIBA European Olympic Qualifying Tournament: finished 11th of 25 teams (Did not qualify for 1992 Summer Olympics)

Angelos Koronios, Kostas Patavoukas, Panagiotis Giannakis, Christos Tsekos, Nikos Boudouris, Ioannis Milonas, Nasos Galakteros, Dimitris Papadopoulos, Dinos Angelidis, Panagiotis Fasoulas, Georgios Papadakos, Fanis Christodoulou (Head Coach: Efthimis Kioumourtzoglou)

2008 FIBA World Olympic Qualifying Tournament: finished 1st (gold) of 12 teams (Qualified for 2008 Summer Olympics)

Thodoris Papaloukas, Ioannis Bourousis, Nikos Zisis, Vassilis Spanoulis, Panagiotis Vasilopoulos, Antonis Fotsis, Georgios Printezis, Andreas Glyniadakis, Kostas Tsartsaris, Dimitris Diamantidis, Sofoklis Schortsanitis, Michalis Pelekanos (Head Coach: Panagiotis Giannakis)

2012 FIBA World Olympic Qualifying Tournament: finished 5th of 12 teams (Did not qualify for 2012 Summer Olympics)

Vassilis Spanoulis, Ioannis Bourousis, Georgios Printezis, Kostas Papanikolaou, Nick Calathes, Nikos Zisis, Michael Bramos, Kostas Vasileiadis, Vangelis Mantzaris, Kostas Kaimakoglou, Antonis Fotsis, Dimitrios Mavroeidis (Head Coach: Ilias Zouros)

2016 Turin FIBA World Olympic Qualifying Tournament: finished 3rd of 6 teams (Did not qualify for 2016 Summer Olympics)

Ioannis Athinaiou, Nick Calathes, Ioannis Bourousis, Vangelis Mantzaris, Dimitris Agravanis, Ioannis Papapetrou, Vassilis Charalampopoulos, Georgios Bogris, Stratos Perperoglou, Giannis Antetokounmpo, Kosta Koufos, Thanasis Antetokounmpo (Head Coach: Fotis Katsikaris)

2020 Victoria FIBA World Olympic Qualifying Tournament: finished 2nd of 6 teams (Did not qualify for 2020 Summer Olympics)

Nikos Rogkavopoulos, Linos Chrysikopoulos, Dimitris Katsivelis, Giannoulis Larentzakis, Vassilis Kavvadas, Nick Calathes, Kostas Sloukas, Georgios Papagiannis, Charis Giannopoulos, Kostas Antetokounmpo, Leonidas Kaselakis, Dinos Mitoglou (Head Coach: Rick Pitino)

== Mediterranean Games ==
1951 Mediterranean Games: finished 4th

Themis Cholevas, Panos Manias, Takis Christoforou, Stelios Arvanitis, Nikos Milas, Mimis Stefanidis, Faidon Matthaiou, Dinos Papadimas, Takis Taliadoros, Ioannis Spanoudakis, Alekos Karalis (Head Coach: Vladimiros Vallas)

1955 Mediterranean Games: finished 3rd (bronze)

Mimis Stefanidis, Alekos Spanoudakis, Kostas Karamanlis, Panos Manias, Dinos Papadimas, Vassilis Eftaxias, Faidon Matthaiou, Themis Cholevas, Aristeidis Roubanis, Ioannis Spanoudakis, Kostas Mourouzis (Head Coach: Nikos Nissiotis)

1967 Mediterranean Games: finished 4th

Kostas Diamantopoulos, Stratos Bazios, Lakis Tsavas, Andreas Chaikalis, Takis Maglos, Georgios Trontzos, Georgios Amerikanos, Christos Zoupas, Kostas Politis, Eas Larentzakis, Georgios Kolokithas, Georgios Barlas (Head Coach: Missas Pantazopoulos)

1971 Mediterranean Games: finished 3rd (bronze)

Kostas Diamantopoulos, Ioannis Politis, Christos Ioardanidis, Thanasis Christoforou, Georgios Barlas, Aris Raftopoulos, Michalis Giannouzakos, Makis Katsafados, Apostolos Kontos, Pavlos Stamelos, Georgios Trontzos, Kostas Bogatsiotis (Head Coach: Themis Cholevas)

1975 Mediterranean Games: finished 5th

Charis Papazoglou, Kostas Petropoulos, Pavlos Stamelos, Pavlos Diakoulas, Dimitris Fosses, Vangelis Alexandris, Steve Giatzoglou, Charis Papageorgiou, Georgios Kastrinakis, Dimitris Kokolakis, Michalis Giannouzakos, Takis Koroneos (Head Coach: Dick Dukeshire)

1979 Mediterranean Games: finished 1st (gold)

Kostas Petropoulos, Georgios Kastrinakis, Vassilis Paramandis, Takis Karatzoulidis, Manthos Katsoulis, Sotiris Sakellariou, Takis Koroneos, Minas Gekos, Liveris Andritsos, Panagiotis Giannakis, Dimitris Kokolakis, (Head Coach: Dick Dukeshire)

1983 Mediterranean Games: finished 4th

Dimitris Dimakopoulos, Fanis Christodoulou, Dimitrios Kokolakis, Nikos Stavropoulos, Michalis Romanidis, Minas Gekos, Kostas Petropoulos, Liveris Andritsos, Albert Mallach, Panagiotis Giannakis, Nikos Filippou, Panagiotis Fasoulas, (Head Coach: Kostas Politis)

=== Greece men's national under-26 basketball team ===
1987 Mediterranean Games: finished 3rd (bronze)

Christos Kountourakis, Konstantinos Alexandridis, Ioannis Papagiannis, Stavros Elliniadis, Konstantinos Kalampakos, Alexis Giannopoulos, Argiris Kambouris, Kostas Patavoukas, Nikolaos Tzigopoulos, Dimitrios Sotiriou, Angelos Papadimitriou (Head Coach: Efthimis Kioumourtzoglou)

1991 Mediterranean Games: finished 2nd (silver)

Nikos Oikonomou, Konstantinos Gagaoudakis, Christos Myriounis, Konstantinos Tampakis, Konstantinos Moraitis, Dinos Angelidis, Evangelos Logothetis, Ioannis Papagiannis, Ioannis Milonas, Aristeidis Cholopoulos, Angelos Koronios, Nikos Boudouris (Head Coach: Georgios Poestos)

1993 Mediterranean Games: finished 4th

Evangelos Logothetis, Konstantinos Tampakis, Michalis Pournaras, Fotios Gousgouris, Tzanis Stavrakopoulos, Theodoros Asteriadis, Dimitrios Avdalas, Achilleas Mamatziolas, Georgios Balogiannis, Aristeidis Cholopoulos, Georgios Limniatis, Nikos Boudouris (Head Coach: Georgios Tsitskaris)

1997 Mediterranean Games: finished 4th

Nikos Vetoulas, Michalis Yfantis, Apostolos Dakos, Georgios Limniatis, Georgios Pavlidis, Konstantinos Nikakis, Georgios Chrysanthopoulos, Vassilis Soulis, Georgios Giannouzakos, Vassilis Kikilias, Ioannis Sioutis, Ilias Tsopis (Head Coach: Georgios Tsitskaris)

2001 Mediterranean Games: finished 2nd (silver)

Pantelis Papaioakeim, Artemios Kouvaris, Dimitris Marmarinos, Dimitrios Misiakos, Vassilis Spanoulis, Georgios Pavlidis, Alexis Falekas, Nikos Zisis, Christos Tapoutos, Antonis Asimakopoulos, Dimitris Diamantidis, Periklis Dorkofikis (Head Coach: Nikos Stavropoulos)

2005 Mediterranean Games: finished 2nd (silver)

Savvas Iliadis, Tasos Charismidis, Georgios Dedas, Fanis Koumpouras, Angelos Siamandouras, Christos Tapoutos, Georgios Tsiakos, Dimitrios Charitopoulos, Nikos Barlos, Nikos Papanikolopoulos, Ioannis Georgallis, Panagiotis Kafkis (Head Coach: Thanasis Papadimitriou)

2009 Mediterranean Games: finished 2nd (silver)

Dimitrios Kalaitzidis, Dimitrios Karadolamis, Fanis Koumpouras, Alexis Kyritsis, Dimitrios Lolas, Dimitrios Mavroeidis, Igor Milošević, Petros Noeas, Nikos Papanikolaou, Gaios Skordilis, Stavros Toutziarakis, Ian Vougioukas (Head Coach: Ioannis Giannapoulos)

== See also ==
- FIBA World Cup
- Basketball at the Summer Olympics
- FIBA World OQT
- FIBA EuroBasket
- Basketball at the Mediterranean Games
- Balkan Basketball Championship
