= EuroBasket 1989 squads =

The following is the list of squads for each of the 8 teams competing in the EuroBasket 1989, held in Yugoslavia between 20 and 25 June 1989. Each team selected a squad of 12 players for the tournament.

== Group A ==
=== Italy ===
Italy men's national basketball team roster
Players
Coaches

Pos.	No.	Name	Age – Date of birth	Height	Club
PG	4	Andrea Gracis	29 – 4 January 1960	1.93 m (6 ft 4 in)	Victoria Libertas Pesaro	(Italy)
PG	5	Mike D'Antoni	38 – 8 May 1951	1.90 m (6 ft 3 in)	Olimpia Milano	(Italy)
C	6	Walter Magnifico	28 – 18 June 1961	2.09 m (6 ft 10 in)	Victoria Libertas Pesaro	(Italy)
F	7	Sandro Dell'Agnello	27 – 20 October 1961	2.03 m (6 ft 8 in)	Juvecaserta Basket	(Italy)
F	8	Beppe Bosa	24 – 9 October 1964	2.04 m (6 ft 8 in)	Pallacanestro Cantù	(Italy)
PG	9	Roberto Brunamonti	30 – 14 April 1959	1.91 m (6 ft 3 in)	Virtus Bologna	(Italy)
G	10	Massimo Iacopini	25 – 10 May 1964	1.96 m (6 ft 5 in)	Benetton Treviso	(Italy)
C	11	Augusto Binelli	24 – 23 September 1964	2.15 m (7 ft 1 in)	Virtus Bologna	(Italy)
F	12	Antonello Riva	27 – 28 February 1962	1.96 m (6 ft 5 in)	Pallacanestro Cantù	(Italy)
F	13	Riccardo Morandotti	23 – 18 September 1965	2.00 m (6 ft 7 in)	Auxilium Torino	(Italy)
C	14	Ario Costa	27 – 26 September 1961	2.11 m (6 ft 11 in)	Victoria Libertas Pesaro	(Italy)
C	15	Flavio Carera	26 – 18 January 1963	2.06 m (6 ft 9 in)	Libertas Livorno	(Italy)

Head coach

- Sandro Gamba

Legend

- Club – describes last
  club before the tournament
- Age – describes age
  on 20 June 1989

=== Netherlands ===
Netherlands men's national basketball team roster
Players
Coaches

Pos.	No.	Name	Age – Date of birth	Height	Club
PG	4	Raymond Bottse	26 – 2 May 1963
PG	5	John Emanuels	26 – 25 February 1963
PG	6	Marco de Waard	27 – 23 November 1961
G	7	Cees van Rootselaar	23 – 4 April 1966	1.88 m (6 ft 2 in)	Den Helder	(Netherlands)
F	8	Rolf Franke	22 – 7 May 1967	1.98 m (6 ft 6 in)	Den Helder	(Netherlands)
F	9	Okke te Velde	22 – 12 August 1966
PF	10	Richard van Poelgeest	23 – 23 March 1966	2.05 m (6 ft 9 in)	Nebraska	(United States)
F	11	Frans Houben	20 – 4 July 1968
C	12	Milko Lieverst	21 – 17 June 1968
C	13	Paul Vrind	21 – 30 March 1968	2.08 m (6 ft 10 in)
C	14	Peter Dam	26 – 21 January 1963
F	15	Jos Kuipers	27 – 10 December 1961

Head coach

- Ruud Harrewijn

Legend

- Club – describes last
  club before the tournament
- Age – describes age
  on 20 June 1989

=== Soviet Union ===
Soviet Union men's national basketball team roster
Players
Coaches

Pos.	No.	Name	Age – Date of birth	Height	Club
G	4	Gundars Vētra	22 – 22 May 1967	1.98 m (6 ft 6 in)	BK VEF Rīga	(Soviet Union)
PG	5	Tiit Sokk	24 – 15 November 1964	1.91 m (6 ft 3 in)	BC Kalev/Cramo	(Soviet Union)
F	6	Viktor Berezhniy	28 – 20 February 1961	2.03 m (6 ft 8 in)	PBC CSKA Moscow	(Soviet Union)
G	7	Šarūnas Marčiulionis	25 – 13 June 1964	1.96 m (6 ft 5 in)	BC Statyba	(Soviet Union)
PF	8	Alexander Volkov	25 – 28 March 1964	2.08 m (6 ft 10 in)	BC Budivelnyk	(Soviet Union)
F	9	Valeri Tikhonenko	24 – 19 August 1964	2.07 m (6 ft 9 in)	BC SKA Alma-Ata	(Soviet Union)
F	10	Rimas Kurtinaitis	29 – 15 May 1960	1.96 m (6 ft 5 in)	BC Žalgiris	(Soviet Union)
C	11	Arvydas Sabonis	24 – 19 December 1964	2.21 m (7 ft 3 in)	BC Žalgiris	(Soviet Union)
C	12	Elşad Qadaşev	21 – 1 May 1968	2.05 m (6 ft 9 in)	BC Dynamo Moscow	(Soviet Union)
PG	13	Valdemaras Chomičius	30 – 4 May 1959	1.92 m (6 ft 4 in)	BC Žalgiris	(Soviet Union)
C	12	Alexander Belostenny	30 – 24 February 1959	2.14 m (7 ft 0 in)	BC Budivelnyk	(Soviet Union)
C	15	Valery Goborov	33 – 20 January 1956	2.07 m (6 ft 9 in)	PBC CSKA Moscow	(Soviet Union)

Head coach

- Vladas Garastas

Legend

- Club – describes last
  club before the tournament
- Age – describes age
  on 20 June 1989

=== Spain ===
Spain men's national basketball team roster
Players
Coaches

Pos.	No.	Name	Age – Date of birth	Height	Club
C	4	Rafael Vecina	25 – 26 April 1964	2.05 m (6 ft 9 in)	Joventut Badalona	(Spain)
PG	5	José Ángel Arcega	25 – 31 May 1964	1.84 m (6 ft 0 in)	CB Zaragoza	(Spain)
G	6	José Biriukov	26 – 3 February 1963	1.94 m (6 ft 4 in)	Real Madrid	(Spain)
PG	7	Pablo Laso	21 – 13 October 1967	1.78 m (5 ft 10 in)	Saski Baskonia	(Spain)
PF	8	Andrés Jiménez	27 – 6 June 1962	2.05 m (6 ft 9 in)	FC Barcelona	(Spain)
C	9	Quique Andreu	21 – 20 October 1967	2.07 m (6 ft 9 in)	CB Zaragoza	(Spain)
PG	10	José Antonio Montero	24 – 3 January 1965	1.93 m (6 ft 4 in)	Joventut Badalona	(Spain)
F	11	Enrique Villalobos	23 – 20 November 1965	1.94 m (6 ft 4 in)	Real Madrid	(Spain)
C	12	Juan Antonio Morales	20 – 18 April 1969	2.11 m (6 ft 11 in)	Joventut Badalona	(Spain)
C	13	Ferrán Martínez	21 – 25 April 1968	2.12 m (6 ft 11 in)	RCD Espanyol	(Spain)
G	14	Manuel Aller	26 – 17 April 1963	1.92 m (6 ft 4 in)	CB OAR Ferrol	(Spain)
F	15	Juan Antonio San Epifanio	30 – 12 June 1959	1.98 m (6 ft 6 in)	FC Barcelona	(Spain)

Head coach

- Antonio Díaz-Miguel

Legend

- Club – describes last
  club before the tournament
- Age – describes age
  on 20 June 1989

== Group B ==
=== Bulgaria ===
Bulgaria men's national basketball team roster
Players
Coaches

Pos.	No.	Name	Age – Date of birth	Height	Club
C	4	Kojo Koev	28 – 24 June 1960
PG	5	Eduard Vălčev	21 – 9 June 1968
PG	6	Jordan Kolev	25 – 22 May 1964
F	7	Robert Gergov	24 – 24 May 1965	2.06 m (6 ft 9 in)
PF	8	Georgi Gluškov	29 – 10 January 1960	2.10 m (6 ft 11 in)	Juvecaserta Basket	(Italy)
F	9	Ventsislav Slavov	25 – 13 November 1963
G	10	Ivan Cenov	27 – 8 February 1962
F	11	Saško Vezenkov	26 – 1 April 1963
F	12	Georgi Mladenov	27 – 11 May 1962	1.92 m (6 ft 4 in)	BC Levski Sofia	(Bulgaria)
F	13	Emil Jonov	27 – 9 December 1961
F	14	Cvetan Antov	27 – 11 May 1962
C	15	Ljubomir Amiorkov	26 – 21 June 1962

Head coach

- Kiril Semov

Legend

- Club – describes last
  club before the tournament
- Age – describes age
  on 20 June 1989

=== France ===
France men's national basketball team roster
Players
Coaches

Pos.	No.	Name	Age – Date of birth	Height	Club
PG	4	Frédéric Hufnagel	28 – 24 August 1960	1.86 m (6 ft 1 in)	Pau-Orthez	(France)
C	5	Jim Bilba	21 – 13 April 1968	1.98 m (6 ft 6 in)	Cholet Basket	(France)
PG	6	Grégor Beugnot	31 – 7 October 1957	1.87 m (6 ft 2 in)	Limoges CSP	(France)
F	7	Richard Dacoury	30 – 6 June 1959	1.95 m (6 ft 5 in)	Limoges CSP	(France)
F	8	Stéphane Lauvergne	21 – 23 January 1968	1.96 m (6 ft 5 in)	ABC Nantes	(France)
C	9	Stéphane Ostrowski	27 – 17 March 1962	2.05 m (6 ft 9 in)	Limoges CSP	(France)
F	10	Éric Occansey	21 – 1 January 1968	1.98 m (6 ft 6 in)	Paris Basket Racing	(France)
F	11	Hervé Dubuisson	31 – 8 August 1957	1.97 m (6 ft 6 in)	Paris Basket Racing	(France)
F	12	Patrick Cham	30 – 18 May 1959	1.96 m (6 ft 5 in)	Cholet Basket	(France)
PF	13	Skeeter Jackson	31 – 7 November 1957	2.04 m (6 ft 8 in)	Pau-Orthez	(France)
C	14	Franck Butter	25 – 14 September 1963	2.10 m (6 ft 11 in)	FC Mulhouse Basket	(France)
C	15	Georges Vestris	30 – 8 June 1959	2.14 m (7 ft 0 in)	Limoges CSP	(France)

Head coach

- Francis Jordane

Legend

- Club – describes last
  club before the tournament
- Age – describes age
  on 20 June 1989

=== Greece ===
Greece men's national basketball team roster
Players
Coaches

Pos.	No.	Name	Age – Date of birth	Height	Club
G	4	Nikos Galis	31 – 23 July 1957	1.83 m (6 ft 0 in)	Aris	(Greece)
G	5	Kostas Patavoukas	23 – 3 February 1966	1.91 m (6 ft 3 in)	A.E.K. Athens	(Greece)
PG	6	Panagiotis Giannakis	30 – 1 January 1959	1.92 m (6 ft 4 in)	Aris	(Greece)
C	7	Argyris Kambouris	27 – 24 January 1962	2.07 m (6 ft 9 in)	Olympiacos	(Greece)
C	8	David Stergakos	32 – 24 October 1956	2.06 m (6 ft 9 in)	Panathinaikos	(Greece)
PF	9	Dinos Angelidis	20 – 5 April 1969	2.08 m (6 ft 10 in)	Sporting Athens	(Greece)
PG	10	Jon Korfas	26 – 21 August 1962	1.82 m (6 ft 0 in)	P.A.O.K.	(Greece)
PF	11	Nikos Filippou	26 – 15 July 1962	2.02 m (6 ft 8 in)	Aris	(Greece)
PF	12	Liveris Andritsos	29 – 31 December 1959	2.02 m (6 ft 8 in)	Panathinaikos	(Greece)
C	13	Panagiotis Fasoulas	26 – 12 May 1963	2.13 m (7 ft 0 in)	P.A.O.K.	(Greece)
F	14	Dimitris Papadopoulos	22 – 15 August 1966	2.02 m (6 ft 8 in)	Iraklis Thessaloniki	(Greece)
F	15	Fanis Christodoulou	24 – 22 May 1965	2.03 m (6 ft 8 in)	Panionios	(Greece)

Head coach

- Efthimis Kioumourtzoglou

Legend

- Club – describes last
  club before the tournament
- Age – describes age
  on 20 June 1989

=== Yugoslavia ===
Yugoslavia men's national basketball team roster
Players
Coaches

Pos.	No.	Name	Age – Date of birth	Height	Club
G	4	Dražen Petrović	24 – 22 October 1964	1.96 m (6 ft 5 in)	Real Madrid	(Spain)
G	5	Zdravko Radulović	22 – 12 December 1966	1.91 m (6 ft 3 in)	KK Bosna	(Socialist Federal Republic of Yugoslavia)
F	6	Zoran Čutura	27 – 12 March 1962	2.02 m (6 ft 8 in)	KK Cibona	(Socialist Federal Republic of Yugoslavia)
F	7	Toni Kukoč	20 – 18 September 1968	2.11 m (6 ft 11 in)	KK Split	(Socialist Federal Republic of Yugoslavia)
F	8	Žarko Paspalj	23 – 27 March 1966	2.08 m (6 ft 10 in)	KK Partizan	(Socialist Federal Republic of Yugoslavia)
PG	9	Jure Zdovc	22 – 13 December 1966	1.98 m (6 ft 6 in)	KK Olimpija	(Socialist Federal Republic of Yugoslavia)
PG	10	Zoran Radović	28 – 17 February 1961	1.91 m (6 ft 3 in)	KK Crvena zvezda	(Socialist Federal Republic of Yugoslavia)
C	11	Stojko Vranković	25 – 22 January 1964	2.18 m (7 ft 2 in)	KK Zadar	(Socialist Federal Republic of Yugoslavia)
C	12	Vlade Divac	21 – 3 February 1968	2.16 m (7 ft 1 in)	Los Angeles Lakers	(United States)
G	13	Predrag Danilović	19 – 26 February 1970	2.01 m (6 ft 7 in)	KK Partizan	(Socialist Federal Republic of Yugoslavia)
C	14	Dino Rađa	22 – 24 April 1967	2.12 m (6 ft 11 in)	KK Split	(Socialist Federal Republic of Yugoslavia)
PF	15	Mario Primorac	27 – 3 October 1961	2.04 m (6 ft 8 in)	KK Bosna	(Socialist Federal Republic of Yugoslavia)

Head coach

- Dušan Ivković

Legend

- Club – describes last
  club before the tournament
- Age – describes age
  on 20 June 1989
