= EuroBasket 1991 squads =

The following is the list of squads for each of the 8 teams competing in the EuroBasket 1991, held in Italy between 24 and 29 June 1991. Each team selected a squad of 12 players for the tournament.

== Group A ==
=== Bulgaria ===
Bulgaria men's national basketball team roster
Players
Coaches

Pos.	No.	Name	Age – Date of birth	Height	Club
PG	4	Ivajlo Ravucov	22 – 30 September 1968	1.88 m (6 ft 2 in)
F	5	Cvetan Nedelčev	23 – 19 April 1968
PG	6	Jordan Kolev	27 – 22 May 1964
F	7	Robert Gergov	26 – 24 May 1965	2.06 m (6 ft 9 in)
C	8	Spas Natov	23 – 5 February 1968
F	9	Plamen Petrov	24 – 31 July 1966
G	10	Ivan Cenov	29 – 8 February 1962
F	11	Saško Vezenkov	28 – 1 April 1963
F	12	Georgi Mladenov	29 – 11 May 1962	1.92 m (6 ft 4 in)	Stade Nabeulien	(Tunisia)
G	13	Daniel Dimitrov	24 – 15 May 1967
PF	14	Georgi Glouchkov	31 – 10 January 1960	2.10 m (6 ft 11 in)	Pallacanestro Reggiana	(Italy)
C	15	Lubomir Amiorkov	29 – 21 June 1962

Head coach

- Simeon Varčev

Legend

- Club – describes last
  club before the tournament
- Age – describes age
  on 24 June 1991

=== Poland ===
Poland men's national basketball team roster
Players
Coaches

Pos.	No.	Name	Age – Date of birth	Height	Club
PG	4	Dariusz Zelig	33 – 22 November 1957	1.92 m (6 ft 4 in)	Śląsk Wrocław	(Poland)
SG	5	Maciej Zieliński	20 – 5 January 1971	1.98 m (6 ft 6 in)	Śląsk Wrocław	(Poland)
G	6	Wojciech Królik	30 – 27 July 1960	1.86 m (6 ft 1 in)	Polonia Warszawa	(Poland)
G	7	Piotr Baran	28 – 21 July 1962	1.88 m (6 ft 2 in)	Lech Poznań	(Poland)
SF	8	Jarosław Marcinkowski	27 – 30 July 1963	2.00 m (6 ft 7 in)	Lech Poznań	(Poland)
PF	9	Jerzy Binkowski	32 – 12 June 1959	2.06 m (6 ft 9 in)	Gwardia Wrocław (basketball)	(Poland)
PG	10	Dariusz Szczubiał	33 – 5 September 1957	1.90 m (6 ft 3 in)	Zagłębie Sosnowiec	(Poland)
PF	11	Adam Wójcik	21 – 20 April 1970	2.08 m (6 ft 10 in)	Śląsk Wrocław	(Poland)
C	12	Jarosław Jechorek	30 – 31 May 1961	2.09 m (6 ft 10 in)	Lech Poznań	(Poland)
C	13	Jacek Duda	27 – 3 July 1963	2.08 m (6 ft 10 in)	Legia Warsaw	(Poland)
F	14	Mariusz Bacik	19 – 4 January 1972	2.07 m (6 ft 9 in)	Stal Bobrek Bytom	(Poland)
SG	15	Tomasz Torgowski	30 – 11 April 1961	1.98 m (6 ft 6 in)	Lech Poznań	(Poland)

Head coach

- Arkadiusz Koniecki

Legend

- Club – describes last
  club before the tournament
- Age – describes age
  on 24 June 1991

=== Spain ===
Spain men's national basketball team roster
Players
Coaches

Pos.	No.	Name	Age – Date of birth	Height	Club
F	4	Jordi Villacampa	27 – 11 October 1963	1.96 m (6 ft 5 in)	Joventut Badalona	(Spain)
PG	5	Mike Hansen	20 – 4 April 1971	1.85 m (6 ft 1 in)	Louisiana State University	(United States)
PG	6	José Miguel Antúnez	24 – 21 February 1967	1.83 m (6 ft 0 in)	CB Estudiantes	(Spain)
PG	7	Rafael Jofresa	24 – 2 September 1966	1.83 m (6 ft 0 in)	Joventut Badalona	(Spain)
C	8	Quique Andreu	23 – 20 October 1967	2.07 m (6 ft 9 in)	CB Zaragoza	(Spain)
F	9	Manel Bosch	23 – 19 September 1967	1.98 m (6 ft 6 in)	CB Granollers	(Spain)
F	10	Pep Cargol	23 – 11 March 1968	2.03 m (6 ft 8 in)	Real Madrid	(Spain)
PF	11	Fernando Arcega	31 – 3 April 1960	2.04 m (6 ft 8 in)	CB Zaragoza	(Spain)
C	12	Juan Antonio Orenga	24 – 29 July 1966	2.06 m (6 ft 9 in)	CB Estudiantes	(Spain)
C	13	Silvano Bustos	24 – 6 September 1966	2.10 m (6 ft 11 in)	CB Valladolid	(Spain)
C	14	Antonio Martín Espina	25 – 18 June 1966	2.10 m (6 ft 11 in)	Real Madrid	(Spain)
F	15	Juan Antonio San Epifanio	32 – 12 June 1959	1.98 m (6 ft 6 in)	FC Barcelona	(Spain)

Head coach

- Antonio Díaz-Miguel

Legend

- Club – describes last
  club before the tournament
- Age – describes age
  on 24 June 1991

=== Yugoslavia ===
Yugoslavia men's national basketball team roster
Players
Coaches

Pos.	No.	Name	Age – Date of birth	Height	Club
PG	4	Zoran Sretenović	26 – 5 August 1964	1.89 m (6 ft 2 in)	KK POP 84	(Socialist Federal Republic of Yugoslavia)
G	5	Velimir Perasović	26 – 9 February 1965	1.95 m (6 ft 5 in)	KK POP 84	(Socialist Federal Republic of Yugoslavia)
PG	6	Aleksandar Đorđević	23 – 26 August 1967	1.88 m (6 ft 2 in)	KK Partizan	(Socialist Federal Republic of Yugoslavia)
F	7	Toni Kukoč	22 – 18 September 1968	2.11 m (6 ft 11 in)	KK POP 84	(Socialist Federal Republic of Yugoslavia)
F	8	Žarko Paspalj	25 – 27 March 1966	2.08 m (6 ft 10 in)	KK Partizan	(Socialist Federal Republic of Yugoslavia)
PG	9	Jure Zdovc	24 – 13 December 1966	1.98 m (6 ft 6 in)	KK Union Olimpija	(Socialist Federal Republic of Yugoslavia)
G	10	Predrag Danilović	21 – 26 February 1970	2.01 m (6 ft 7 in)	KK Partizan	(Socialist Federal Republic of Yugoslavia)
C	11	Zoran Jovanović	26 – 25 May 1965	2.10 m (6 ft 11 in)	KK Crvena zvezda	(Socialist Federal Republic of Yugoslavia)
C	12	Vlade Divac	23 – 3 February 1968	2.16 m (7 ft 1 in)	Los Angeles Lakers	(United States)
F	13	Arijan Komazec	21 – 23 January 1970	2.01 m (6 ft 7 in)	KK Zadar	(Socialist Federal Republic of Yugoslavia)
C	14	Dino Rađa	24 – 24 April 1967	2.12 m (6 ft 11 in)	Virtus Roma	(Italy)
C	15	Zoran Savić	24 – 18 November 1966	2.06 m (6 ft 9 in)	KK POP 84	(Socialist Federal Republic of Yugoslavia)

Head coach

- Dušan Ivković

Legend

- Club – describes last
  club before the tournament
- Age – describes age
  on 24 June 1991

== Group B ==
=== Czechoslovakia ===
Czechoslovakia men's national basketball team roster
Players
Coaches

Pos.	No.	Name	Age – Date of birth	Height	Club
F	4	Vladimír Vyoral	29 – 5 December 1961	1.92 m (6 ft 4 in)
G	5	Michal Ježdík	27 – 4 August 1963	1.89 m (6 ft 2 in)
PG	6	Václav Hrubý	24 – 18 December 1966
C	7	Július Michalík	19 – 24 February 1972
PF	8	Pavel Bečka	20 – 7 November 1970
G	9	Josef Michalko	30 – 8 May 1961
C	10	Jiří Okáč	27 – 3 November 1963	2.17 m (7 ft 1 in)	SC Videoton	(Hungary)
PF	11	Jan Svoboda	27 – 3 November 1963
PF	12	Leoš Krejčí	26 – 17 January 1965
PF	13	Richard Petruška	22 – 25 January 1969	2.08 m (6 ft 10 in)	Loyola Marymount University	(United States)
PF	14	Štefan Svitek	24 – 20 November 1966	2.04 m (6 ft 8 in)	BC Brno	(Czechoslovakia)
F	15	Stanislav Kameník	23 – 30 January 1968

Head coach

- Jan Bobrovský

Legend

- Club – describes last
  club before the tournament
- Age – describes age
  on 24 June 1991

=== France ===
France men's national basketball team roster
Players
Coaches

Pos.	No.	Name	Age – Date of birth	Height	Club
PG	4	Frédéric Forte	21 – 27 January 1970	1.92 m (6 ft 4 in)	BCM Gravelines	(France)
PG	5	Valéry Demory	27 – 13 September 1963	1.78 m (5 ft 10 in)	Limoges CSP	(France)
PG	6	Antoine Rigaudeau	19 – 17 December 1971	2.00 m (6 ft 7 in)	Cholet Basket	(France)
F	7	Richard Dacoury	32 – 6 June 1959	1.95 m (6 ft 5 in)	Limoges CSP	(France)
PF	8	Philippe Szanyiel	30 – 23 December 1960	2.04 m (6 ft 8 in)	FC Mulhouse Basket	(France)
C	9	Stéphane Ostrowski	29 – 17 March 1962	2.05 m (6 ft 9 in)	Limoges CSP	(France)
F	10	Hugues Occansey	24 – 18 December 1966	2.00 m (6 ft 7 in)	Olympique Antibes	(France)
F	11	Didier Gadou	25 – 28 September 1965	2.03 m (6 ft 8 in)	Pau-Orthez	(France)
PF	12	Félix Courtinard	29 – 12 July 1961	2.05 m (6 ft 9 in)	Cholet Basket	(France)
F	13	Georges Adams	24 – 9 March 1967	1.95 m (6 ft 5 in)	Olympique Antibes	(France)
C	14	Jim Deines	28 – 26 September 1962	2.05 m (6 ft 9 in)	Olympique Antibes	(France)
PF	15	Jim Bilba	23 – 13 April 1968	1.98 m (6 ft 6 in)	Cholet Basket	(France)

Head coach

- Francis Jordane

Legend

- Club – describes last
  club before the tournament
- Age – describes age
  on 24 June 1991

=== Greece ===
Greece men's national basketball team roster
Players
Coaches

Pos.	No.	Name	Age – Date of birth	Height	Club
G	4	Nikos Galis	33 – 23 July 1957	1.83 m (6 ft 0 in)	Aris	(Greece)
G	5	Kostas Patavoukas	25 – 3 February 1966	1.91 m (6 ft 3 in)	A.E.K. Athens	(Greece)
PG	6	Panagiotis Giannakis	32 – 1 January 1959	1.92 m (6 ft 4 in)	Aris	(Greece)
C	7	Argyris Kambouris	29 – 24 January 1962	2.07 m (6 ft 9 in)	Olympiacos	(Greece)
PF	8	Dinos Angelidis	22 – 5 April 1969	2.08 m (6 ft 10 in)	Aris	(Greece)
F	9	Ioannis Milonas	21 – 27 July 1969	2.02 m (6 ft 8 in)	Peristeri B.C.	(Greece)
G	10	Giorgos Gasparis	26 – 31 January 1965	1.93 m (6 ft 4 in)	Panionios B.C.	(Greece)
C	11	Vassilis Lipiridis	24 – 1 January 1967	2.02 m (6 ft 8 in)	Aris	(Greece)
PF	12	Liveris Andritsos	31 – 31 December 1959	2.02 m (6 ft 8 in)	Panathinaikos	(Greece)
C	13	Panagiotis Fasoulas	28 – 12 May 1963	2.13 m (7 ft 0 in)	P.A.O.K.	(Greece)
C	14	Giorgos Papadakos	25 – 27 August 1965	2.14 m (7 ft 0 in)	Olympiacos	(Greece)
F	15	Dimitris Papadopoulos	24 – 15 August 1966	2.02 m (6 ft 8 in)	Iraklis Thessaloniki	(Greece)

Head coach

- Efthimis Kioumourtzoglou

Legend

- Club – describes last
  club before the tournament
- Age – describes age
  on 24 June 1991

=== Italy ===
Italy men's national basketball team roster
Players
Coaches

Pos.	No.	Name	Age – Date of birth	Height	Club
PG	4	Alessandro Fantozzi	30 – 17 March 1961	1.89 m (6 ft 2 in)	Libertas Livorno	(Italy)
PG	5	Ferdinando Gentile	24 – 1 January 1967	1.90 m (6 ft 3 in)	Juvecaserta Basket	(Italy)
C	6	Walter Magnifico	30 – 18 June 1961	2.09 m (6 ft 10 in)	Victoria Libertas Pesaro	(Italy)
F	7	Sandro Dell'Agnello	29 – 20 October 1961	2.03 m (6 ft 8 in)	Juvecaserta Basket	(Italy)
PG	8	Andrea Gracis	31 – 4 January 1960	1.93 m (6 ft 4 in)	Victoria Libertas Pesaro	(Italy)
PG	9	Roberto Brunamonti	32 – 14 April 1959	1.91 m (6 ft 3 in)	Virtus Bologna	(Italy)
F	10	Roberto Premier	33 – 25 January 1958	1.97 m (6 ft 6 in)	Virtus Roma	(Italy)
F	11	Riccardo Pittis	22 – 18 December 1968	2.03 m (6 ft 8 in)	Olimpia Milano	(Italy)
F	12	Antonello Riva	29 – 28 February 1962	1.96 m (6 ft 5 in)	Olimpia Milano	(Italy)
PF	13	Davide Pessina	23 – 7 February 1968	2.06 m (6 ft 9 in)	Pallacanestro Cantù	(Italy)
C	14	Ario Costa	29 – 26 September 1961	2.11 m (6 ft 11 in)	Victoria Libertas Pesaro	(Italy)
C	15	Stefano Rusconi	22 – 2 October 1968	2.08 m (6 ft 10 in)	Pallacanestro Varese	(Italy)

Head coach

- Sandro Gamba

Legend

- Club – describes last
  club before the tournament
- Age – describes age
  on 24 June 1991
