= Taliadoros =

Taliadoros is a Greek surname. Notable people with the surname include:

- Dimitrios Taliadoros (1925–2011), Greek basketball player
- Kimon Taliadoros (born 1968), Australian footballer, sports commentator, and businessman
