= Basketball at the 1983 Mediterranean Games =

The basketball tournament at the 1983 Mediterranean Games was held in Casablanca, Morocco.

== Medalists ==
Event	Gold	Silver	Bronze
Men	Yugoslavia	Italy	Turkey

=== Standings ===
Rank	Team
1st place, gold medalist(s)	Yugoslavia Borislav Vučević, Stevica Čeko, Nebojša Zorkić, Zufer Avdija, Ivan Sunara, Emir Mutapčić, Stevan Karadžić, Zlatko Šantelj, Jadran Vujačić, Mihovil Nakić, Zoran Jovanović, Branko Vukičević. Coach: Janez Drvarič
2nd place, silver medalist(s)	Italy Andrea Gracis, Dino Boselli, Giampiero Savio, Alberto Tonut, Ario Costa, Marco Solfrini, Renato Villalta, Mark Campanaro, Walter Magnifico, Renzo Vecchiato, Marco Ricci, Romeo Sacchetti. Coach: Sandro Gamba
3rd place, bronze medalist(s)	Turkey Lütfi Arıboğan, Hakan Artış, Efe Aydan, Mehmet Döğüşken, Derya Engül, Melih Erçin, Necati Güler, Serdar Koçyiğit, Erman Kunter, Can Sonat, Emir Turam, Behçet Üner. Coach: Aydan Siyavuş
4	Greece Liveris Andritsos, Fanis Christodoulou, Dimitris Dimakopoulos, Panagiotis Fasoulas, Nikos Filippou, Minas Gkekos, Panagiotis Giannakis, Dimitris Kokolakis, Albert Mallach, Kostas Petropoulos, Michalis Romanidis, Nikos Stavropoulos. Coach: Kostas Politis
5	Egypt
6	Morocco
7	Tunisia
