= Basketball at the 1967 Mediterranean Games =

- Dates: 9 – 16 September 1967

The basketball tournament at the 1967 Mediterranean Games was held in Tunis, Tunisia.

== Medalists ==
Event	Gold	Silver	Bronze
Men's Competition	Yugoslavia	Italy	Turkey

== Group matches ==
=== Group A ===
	Team	Points	G	W	D	L	GF	GA	Diff
1.	Yugoslavia	8	4	4	0	0	394	267	+127
2.	Greece	7	4	3	0	1	357	281	+76
3.	France	6	4	2	0	2	305	201	+104
4.	Algeria	5	4	1	0	3	245	332	−87
5.	Libya	4	4	0	0	4	206	426	−220

- September 9, 1967

Greece	123 – 51	Libya
France	51 – 54	Yugoslavia

- September 10, 1967

France	85 – 47	Algeria
Greece	73 – 99	Yugoslavia

- September 11, 1967

Libya	45 – 68	Algeria
Greece	68 – 66	France

- September 12, 1967

Yugoslavia	132 – 78	Libya
Algeria	65 – 93	Greece

- September 13, 1967

France	103 – 32	Libya
Yugoslavia	109 – 65	Algeria

=== Group B ===
	Team	Points	G	W	D	L	GF	GA	Diff
1.	Italy	6	3	3	0	0	256	185	+71
2.	Turkey	5	3	2	0	1	246	224	+22
3.	Spain	4	3	1	0	2	248	242	+6
4.	Tunisia	3	3	0	0	3	160	259	−99

- September 9, 1967

Italy	78 – 59	Turkey
Tunisia	54 – 82	Spain

- September 11, 1967

Italy	87 – 77	Spain
Tunisia	57 – 86	Turkey

- September 13, 1967

Turkey	101 – 89	Spain
Tunisia	49 – 91	Italy

=== Final round ===
Semi-finals
Yugoslavia	94
Turkey	59
Italy	77
Greece	69

Final
Italy	76
Yugoslavia	87
Third place
Turkey	87
Greece	84

=== Semi finals ===
- September 14, 1967

Yugoslavia	94 – 59	Turkey
Italy	77 – 69	Greece

=== Classification matches ===
- September 14, 1967

Spain	102 – 61	Algeria
France	97 – 43	Tunisia

=== Finals ===
- September 16, 1967 — 7th/8th place

Tunisia	? – ?	Algeria

- September 16, 1967 — 5th/6th place

France	84 – 72	Spain

- September 16, 1967 — Bronze Medal Match

Turkey	87 – 84	Greece

- September 16, 1967 — Gold Medal Match

Italy	76 – 87	Yugoslavia

=== Standings ===
Rank	Team
1st place, gold medalist(s)	Yugoslavia Goran Brajković, Krešimir Ćosić, Vladimir Cvetković, Kosta Grubor, Zoran Marojević, Momčilo Pazman, Nikola Plećaš, Ljubodrag Simonović, Petar Skansi, Damir Šolman, Ratomir Tvrdić, Aljoša Žorga. Coach: Ranko Žeravica
2nd place, silver medalist(s)	Italy Franco Bertini, Sauro Bufalini, Massimo Cosmelli, Gianfranco Fantin, Fernando Fattori, Gianluigi Jessi, Massimo Masini, Alberto Merlati, Aldo Ossola, Lino Paschini, Carlo Recalcati, Gabriele Vianello. Coach: Nello Paratore
3rd place, bronze medalist(s)	Turkey Hüseyin Alp, İbrahim Ortaç, Mehmet Arman, Halil Dağlı, Kemal Erdenay, Akın Gönülşen, Şengün Kaplanoğlu, Barış Küce, Erdal Poyrazoğlu, Haluk Tunçeri, İlker Esel, Ferhan Baras. Coach: Michael Prekopiak
4	Greece Georgios Amerikanos, Georgios Mparlas, Stratos Mpazios, Andreas Chaikalis, Kostas Diamantopoulos, Giorgos Kolokithas, Aias Larentzakis, Takis Maglos, Kostas Politis, Georgios Trontzos, Lakis Tsavas, Christos Zoupas. Coach: Missas Pantazopoulos
5	France Christian Baltzer, Jean Degros, Alain Durand, Bernard Fatien, Alain Gilles, Michel Le Ray, Gérard Lespinasse, Michel Longueville, Claude Peter, Bruno Recoura, Alain Schol, Jean-Pierre Staelens. Coach: Joë Jaunay
6	Spain Francesc Buscató, Ramón Guardiola, Pepe Laso, Carlos Luquero, Enric Margall, Alfonso Martínez, Moncho Monsalve, Vicente Paniagua, José Ramón Ramos, Emiliano Rodríguez, José Luis Sagi-Vela, Ángel Serrano. Coach: Antonio Díaz-Miguel
7	Tunisia
8	Algeria
9	Libya
