= Papagou B.C. =

A.S. Papagou
- Nickname: Στρατηγοί (Generals)
- Leagues: Greek Elite League; Greek Cup
- Founded: 1966 (parent athletic club); 1976 (basketball club)
- History: 1976 – Present
- Arena: "Saloun" Indoor Hall
- Capacity: 800
- Location: Papagou, Attica, Greece
- Team colors: Blue and White
- Head coach: Simeonidis Savvas
- Championships: Greek 2nd Division Championships: (3) (1990, 1993, 1995)
- Retired numbers: 2 (9, 13)
- Website: acpapagou.gr
Home

Papagou B.C., or Papagou Athens B.C. (alternate spelling: Papagos) is a Greek professional basketball club that was founded in 1976. The team is located in Papagou, Attica, Greece. The club's full name is Athlitikos Syllogos Papagou Athens Basketball Club, which is abbreviated as A.S. Papagou Athens B.C. (Greek: Α.Σ. Παπάγου Αθήνα K.A.E.).

== Logos ==
(The official logo of Papagou B.C.)

(The official alternate logo of Papagou B.C.)

== History ==
The club's parent athletic association was founded in 1966. Ten years later, in 1976, the men's basketball club was founded. Papagou was promoted into the major Greek basketball division in 1990. The team spent seven seasons there in the 1990s, and had success in the 1996–97 season, and especially in the 1997–98 season, by beating Peristeri in the first round of the Greek League playoffs, before losing to PAOK in the second round. Led in that era by the great scorers Alphonso Ford and Georgios Diamantopoulos, they finished 7th in the Greek League in the 1996–97 season, and gained a qualification to the following 1997–98 season's FIBA Korać Cup competition. They would make one more appearance in that European-wide 3rd-tier level competition, during the 1998–99 season.

More recently, the Papagou basketball team struggled to hold on to its position in the top league in Greece, the first division Greek Basket League. In the 1998–99 season, the team competed in the Greek first division, for the last time in recent years.

== Arena ==
The team's home arena is "Saloun" Indoor Hall, which is located approximately two miles away from downtown Papagou.

== Titles and honors ==
- Greek 2nd Division Champion (3):
  - 1990, 1993, 1995

== Retired numbers ==
Papagou B.C. retired numbers
N°	Nat.	Player	Position	Tenure
9	(United States)	Alphonso Ford	SG	1996–1997
13	(Greece)	Michalis Yfantis	SF	

== Notable players ==
Note: Flags indicate national team eligibility at FIBA-sanctioned events. Players may hold other non-FIBA nationalities not displayed.

Criteria

To appear in this section a player must have either:

- Set a club record or won an individual award while at the club
- Played at least one official international match for their national team at any time
- Played at least one official NBA match at any time.

Greece:

- Antonis Asimakopoulos
- Georgios Bosganas
- Kostas Charissis
- Georgios Diamantopoulos
- George Dikeoulakos
- Periklis Dorkofikis
- Nikos Filippou
- Memos Ioannou
- Sotiris Katoufas
- Jon Korfas
- Alexis Kyritsis
- Georgios Limniatis
- Sotiris Manolopoulos
- Nikos Michalos
- - Michalis Misunov
- - George Papadakos
- Michalis Romanidis
- Georgios Sigalas
- Michalis Yfantis
- Alexandros Zabetakis
- - Anatoly Zourpenko

Europe:'

- Stephen Arigbabu

USA:

- Tony Costner
- Derrek Farr
- Alphonso Ford
- Greg Foster
- Lowell Hamilton
- Tony Harris
- Todd Mitchell
- Mikki Moore
- Lawrence Moten
- Anthony Pelle
- John Shasky
- Tony White
- Randy Woods

Africa:

- Alaa Abdelnaby

== Head coaches ==
- David Stergakos
- Kostas Diamantopoulos
- Kostas Missas
- Michalis Kyritsis
- Jon Korfas
- Minas Gekos
- Dinos Kalampakos
