= Michalis Giannouzakos =

Greek basketball player and coach (born 1949)

Personal information
- Born: 1949 (age 76–77) Greece
- Listed height: 6 ft 4.75 in (1.95 m)
- Listed weight: 220 lb (100 kg)

Career information
- NBA draft: 1971: undrafted
- Playing career: 1964–1982
- Position: Small forward / power forward
- Number: 7

Career history
- 1964–1974: HAN Thessaloniki
- 1974–1981: AEK Athens
- 1981–1982: Aris Thessaloniki
Medals
Men's Basketball
Representing Greece
Mediterranean Games
Bronze medal – third place	1971 Turkey

Michalis Giannouzakos (Greek: Μιχάλης Γιαννουζάκος; born 1949) is a retired Greek professional basketball player and basketball coach.

== Playing career ==
=== Club playing career ===
Giannouzakos began playing club basketball with the Greek club HAN Thessaloniki (YMCA) in 1964. He moved to AEK Athens in 1974. He then joined Aris in 1981.

=== National team career ===
Giannouzakos was a member of the senior men's Greek national basketball team. With Greece's senior men's national team, he had 147 caps, and he scored 956 points (6.5 points per game). With Greece's senior men's team, he played at the 1972 Pre-Olympic Tournament, the EuroBasket 1973, the EuroBasket 1975, and the EuroBasket 1979.

== Coaching career ==
After he retired from his playing career, Giannouzakos became a basketball coach.
