= Dimitris Papadopoulos (basketball player) =

Greek former basketball player

Personal information
- Born: August 15, 1966 (age 60) Thessaloniki, Greece
- Listed height: 6 ft 7.5 in (2.02 m)
- Listed weight: 250 lb (113 kg)

Career information
- Playing career: 1985–1999
- Position: Small forward / power forward
- Number: 10

Career history
- 1985–1994: Iraklis Thessaloniki
- 1995–1996: A.E.K.
- 1996–1997: Iraklis Thessaloniki
- 1997–1999: A.E.K.

Career highlights
- Greek League All-Star (1991)
Medals
Men's basketball
Representing Greece
EuroBasket
Silver medal – second place	1989 Yugoslavia

Dimitris Papadopoulos (Greek: Δημήτρης Παπαδόπουλος; born August 15, 1966, in Greece), also commonly known by his nickname, "The Doctor", is a Greek former professional basketball player.

== Professional career ==
Papadopoulos began his pro club career with the Greek club Iraklis Thessaloniki. Papadopoulos and Lefteris Kakiousis were the key players of the team in those days. With Iraklis, he was a Greek Cup finalist in 1994. Papadopoulos is the second leading scorer, the first rebounder, the first in three-point field goals made, and the third player in the number of games played, in Iraklis' club history.

Papadopoulos finished his playing career with the Greek club AEK Athens.

== National team career ==
Papadopoulos was also a member of the senior men's Greek national team. He played at the 1988 FIBA European Olympic Qualifying Tournament. With Greece, he won the silver medal at the 1989 EuroBasket.

Papadopoulos was also a member of the Greek national teams that finished in sixth place at the 1990 FIBA World Championship, and in fifth place at the 1991 EuroBasket. He also represented Greece at the 1992 FIBA European Olympic Qualifying Tournament.

== Personal life ==
After, his retirement from playing professional club basketball, Papadopoulos became an Anesthesiologist.
