= Achilleas Mamatziolas =

Greek basketball player

Personal information
- Born: November 12, 1971 (age 55) Thessaloniki, Greece
- Listed height: 6 ft 4.5 in (1.94 m)
- Listed weight: 210 lb (95 kg)

Career information
- Playing career: 1989–2003
- Position: Shooting guard

Career history
- 1989–1997: PAOK
- 1997–1999: Iraklis Thessaloniki
- 1999–2000: Heraklion
- 2000–2001: G.S. Larissas
- 2001–2003: Olympia Larissa

Career highlights
- European Cup Winners' Cup champion (1991); FIBA Korać Cup champion (1994); Greek League champion (1992); Greek Cup winner (1995)

Achilleas Mamatziolas (Greek: Αχιλλέας Μαματζιόλας; born November 12, 1971, in Thessaloniki), is a retired Greek professional basketball player.

== Professional career ==
Mamatziolas started his career from the amateur team Propontida Thessaloniki. In 1989 he signed with PAOK. He played eight years with PAOK and he won the 1990–91 FIBA European Cup Winners' Cup, 1 Greek League (1992), the 1993–94 FIBA Korać Cup, and 1 Greek Cup (1995). His best game in his career was a play-off game against Panathinaikos in 1997. PAOK won the game with 90-85, and Mamatziolas end the game with 29 points and 100% hit. He has 2/2 free throws, 6/6 two-points, and 5/5 three-points. Mamatziolas moved to Iraklis the same year, as an exchange for Lefteris Kakiousis transfer. He also, played with Iraklio B.C., Gymnastikos S. Larissas B.C. and G.S. Olympia Larissa B.C.

== National team career ==
Mamatziolas played with Greek national basketball team in 1993 Mediterranean Games, and won the fourth place. He also played at FIBA Under-21 World Championship 1993.
