= Sotiris Katoufas =

Greek basketball player

Sotiris Katoufas Σωτήρης Κατούφας
AOF Porfyras
- Position: Power forward / center
- League: Greek C Basket League

Personal information
- Born: July 10, 1979 (age 47) Athens, Greece
- Listed height: 6 ft 9 in (2.06 m)
- Listed weight: 240 lb (109 kg)

Career information
- Playing career: 1997–present

Career history
- 1997–1998: Papagou
- 1998–1999: Ionikos NF
- 1999–2000: OFI
- 2000–2003: Kolossos Rodou
- 2003–2004: Panelefsiniakos
- 2004–2011: Ikaros Kallitheas
- 2011–2012: Panerythraikos
- 2012–2017: Faros Keratsiniou
- 2017–2020: Ionikos Nikaias
- 2020–present: AOF Porfyras

Career highlights
- 2× Greek 2nd Division champion (2010, 2019); Greek 3rd Division champion (2018)

Sotiris Katoufas (alternate spelling Sotirios) (Greek: Σωτήρης Κατούφας; born July 10, 1979) is a Greek professional basketball player for AOF Porfyras of the Greek C Basket League. He is a 2.06 m (6 ft 9 in) tall power forward–center.

== Professional career ==
After playing basketball with the junior youth teams of Olympiacos, from 1995 to 1997, Katoufas began his pro career with Papagou, during the 1997–98 season. He played in the Greek 2nd Division with Faros Keratsiniou. In 2017, he joined the Greek 3rd Division club Ionikos Nikaias.
