= HANTH B.C. =

Χ.Α.Ν.Θ. H.A.N.TH.
- Leagues: Greek 3rd Division
- Founded: 1919 (basketball section); 1921 MSC
- History: 1919–Present
- Arena: Y.M.C.A. New Sports Center
- Capacity: 1,500
- Location: Thessaloniki, Greece
- Team colors: Red, White, Blue
- Website: YMCA.gr

HANTH B.C. is the men's basketball department of the Greek multi-sports club HANTH. It was founded in 1919. The club is based in Thessaloniki, Greece. The club's Greek name is X.A.N.Θ (Χριστιανική Αδελφότητα Νέων Θεσσαλονίκης), which means Young Men's Christian Association of Thessaloniki. Common alternate names of the club include HANTh B.C. and HAN Thessaloniki B.C. The club is also known as being the YMCA Thessaloniki Association's basketball club, or YMCA Thessaloniki B.C.

== History ==
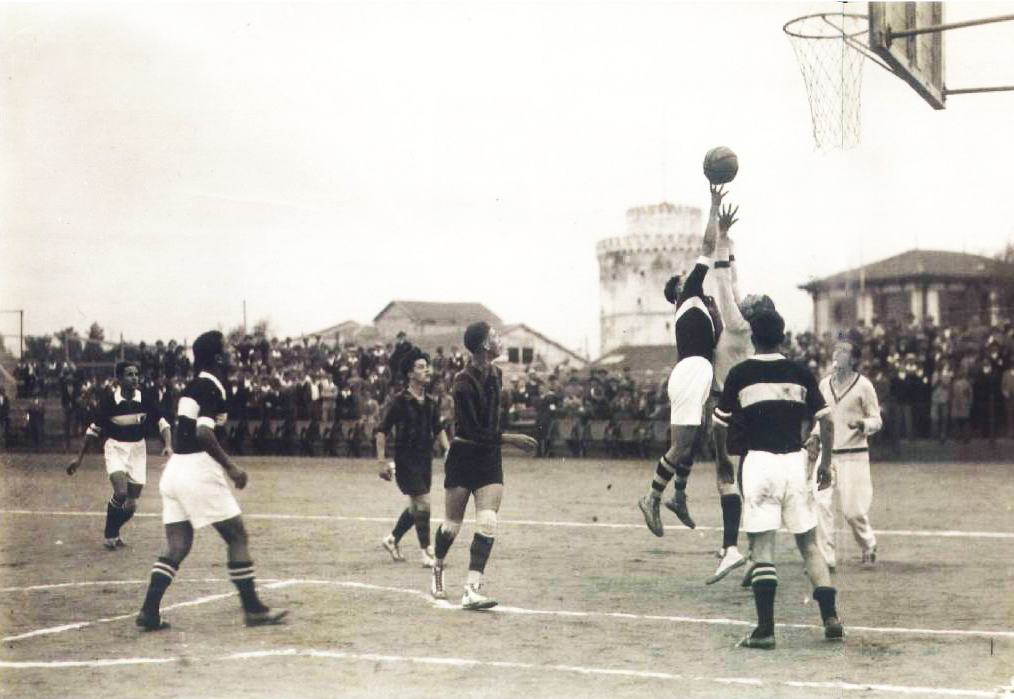
PAOK Thessaloniki vs. HANTH (YMCA) Thessaloniki, during the 1920s.

In 1919, organized basketball began to be played by HANTH locally. Then in 1921, the parent athletic club Χ.Α.Ν.Θ. (English: YMCA) was formed, and it included the basketball section. HAN Thessaloniki was one of the founding members of the first Thessaloniki regional basketball tournament (1925–26), and it finished in second place in that tournament, behind Aris Thessaloniki.

HAN won the Greek 2nd Division championship in the 1968–69 season. The club played in Europe's third-tier level league, the FIBA Korać Cup competition, in the 1973 season, the 1973–74 season, and in the 1974–75 season. HAN also won the Greek 2nd Division championship in the 1976–77 season.

The club won the Greek 4th Division championship in the 1991–92 season. Over the years, HAN Thessaloniki has played in the top-tier level Greek League in a total of 22 seasons.

== Arena ==
HAN Thessaloniki's current home indoor arena, is the Y.M.C.A. New Sports Center, which has a seating capacity of 1,500.

== Titles and honors ==
National:

- Greek 2nd Division: (2×) Champion:
  - (1969, 1977)
- Greek 4th Division: Champion:
  - (1992)

Regional:

- Thessaloniki Regional Championship: 16× Champion (record):
  - (1931, 1932, 1933, 1934, 1946, 1947, 1948, 1949, 1950, 1951, 1952, 1953, 1954, 1955, 1956, 1957)

== Notable players ==
Note: Flags indicate national team eligibility at FIBA-sanctioned events. Players may hold other non-FIBA nationalities not displayed.

Criteria

To appear in this section a player must have either:

- Set a club record or won an individual award while at the club
- Played at least one official international match for their national team at any time
- Played at least one official NBA match at any time.

- Dionysis Ananiadis
- Michalis Giannouzakos
- Vassilis Lipiridis
- Sotos Nikolaidis
- Anestis Petalidis
- / Vladimir Petrović-Stergiou
- Christoforos Stefanidis
- Takis Taliadoros
- Georgios Trontzos
- Lakis Tsavas
- Mimis Tsikinas
- Kostas Vlasios
- Nikos Zisis

=== Retired numbers ===
HANTH B.C. retired numbers
N°	Nat.	Player	Position	Tenure	Year Retired
#3	(Greece)	Takis Taliadoros	PF		
	(Greece)	Nikos Zisis	PG / SG	1996–2000	2021

== Head coaches ==
- / Jon Korfas: (2010–2012)
- Sotos Nikolaidis: (2016–2018)

== Greek basketball museum ==
The club's headquarters also houses a Greek national basketball museum.
