= OFI Crete B.C. =

OFI Crete
- Nickname: Όμιλος (The team)
- Leagues: Greek C League
- Founded: 1925; 101 years ago (parent athletic club)
- Arena: Heraklion Indoor Sports Arena
- Capacity: 5,222
- Location: Heraklion, Crete, Greece
- Team colors: White and Black
- Website: ofierasitechnis.gr
Home	Away

OFI Crete B.C. (Greek: Ό.Φ.Η. K.A.E.) is a Greek professional basketball club that is located on the Greek island of Crete, in Heraklion. It is a part of the OFI Crete multi sports club. The club's full name is Club of Fans of Heraklion 1925 (Όμιλος Φιλάθλων Ηρακλείου 1925).

== History ==
The club's parent athletic association, OFI Crete, was founded in 1925. The club's men's basketball team won the championship of the Greek 4th-tier level Greek C Basket League in 1998, and was promoted to the third-tier level Greek B Basket League. After that, it was relegated back down the Greek C Basket League, but it returned to the Greek B Basket League in 2008.

The next year, OFI was promoted to the 2nd-tier level Greek A2 Basket League, for first time. After a short fall back into the Greek B Basket League, the club returned to the Greek A2 Basket League, and remained there until 2015, when the club was withdrawn from the league due to financial problems.

== Arena ==
The club plays its home games at the 1,000 seat Vardinogiannis Sports Center.

== Honors ==
=== Divisional competitions ===
- Greek 3rd Division Champion: (2011)
- 2× Greek 4th Division 2nd Group Champion: (1998, 2008)

== Notable players ==
Note: Flags indicate national team eligibility at FIBA-sanctioned events. Players may hold other non-FIBA nationalities not displayed.

Criteria

To appear in this section a player must have either:

- Set a club record or won an individual award while at the club
- Played at least one official international match for their national team at any time
- Played at least one official NBA match at any time.

- (Greece) Spyros Mourtos
- (Greece) Vassilis Lipiridis
- (Greece) Dimitris Katiakos
- (Greece) Dimitris Karadolamis
- (Greece) Stavros Toutziarakis
- (Greece) Sotiris Katoufas
- (Greece) / (Israel) Marios Matalon
- (Cyprus) / (Greece) Christopher Razis
- (Cyprus) / (Greece) Nikos Stylianou
- (Serbia) / (Greece) Milan Sagias
- (Serbia) Stefan Đorđević
- (United States) / (Iceland) Darrel Lewis

== Head coaches ==
- (Greece) Stefanos Dedas
- (Greece) Georgios Vovoras
