= Manuel Aller =

Spanish basketball player and coach

Personal information
- Born: 17 April 1963 (age 63) Ponferrada, Spain

Career information
- Playing career: 1980–2001
- Position: Shooting guard

Career history

Playing
- 1980–1982: OAR Ferrol
- 1983–1994: OAR Ferrol
- 1994–1995: Salamanca
- 1995–1996: OAR Ferrol
- 1996–2001: Galicia Ferrol

Coaching
- 2000: Galicia Ferrol

Manuel Angel Manuel Aller Carballo (born 17 April 1963 in Ponferrada, León) is a former Spanish basketball player. With height 1.92 meters tall, he occupied the position of shooting guard.

== International career ==
Aller played the EuroBasket 1989 with the Spanish national team.
