= George Papadakos =

Greek-Canadian basketball player

Personal information
- Born: August 27, 1965 Toronto, Canada
- Listed height: 7 ft 0 in (2.13 m)
- Listed weight: 235 lb (107 kg)

Career information
- High school: St. Michael's, Toronto, Ontario, Canada
- College: Syracuse (1983–1986) Michigan State (1986–1988)
- NBA draft: 1988: undrafted
- Playing career: 1988–2001
- Position: Center
- Number: 14
- Coaching career: 2001–present

Career history

Playing
- 1988–1996: Olympiacos Piraeus
- 1996–1997: Peiraikos Syndesmos
- 1997–1998: Panionios Athens
- 2000–2001: Papagou Athens

Coaching
- 2001–2006: Chios Women's Basketball

Career highlights
- As player: 4× Greek League champion (1993–1996); Greek Cup winner (1994)
Medals
Men's basketball
Representing Canada
Summer Universiade
| Bronze medal – third place | 1985 Japan |

George Ioannis Papadakos (alternate spellings: Georgios, Giorgos; Greek: Γιώργος Ιωάννης Παπαδάκος) is a former Greek-Canadian professional basketball player and coach.

== High school and early years ==
Papadakos was born in Toronto, Ontario, Canada. He attended St. Michael's College School, in Toronto, where he played high school basketball.

== College career ==
Papadakos first attended Syracuse University, from 1983 to 1985. While at Syracuse, he played college basketball in the NCAA Division I, with the Syracuse Orangemen, under the school's head coach, Jim Boeheim. He then transferred to Michigan State University, where he played with the Michigan State Spartans, under head Jud Heathcote, from 1986 to 1988.

Papadakos averaged 10.1 points, 5.7 rebounds, and 1.4 blocks per game in his senior season with Michigan State.

== Professional career ==
After graduating from college, Papadakos competed in the training camp of the NBA's Detroit Pistons. He then began his pro club career with the Greek club Olympiacos Piraeus, in 1988. With Olympiacos, Papdakos won four straight Greek League championships, as he won the Greek League title in the years 1993, 1994, 1995, and 1996.

Papadakos also played in Europe's top-tier level European-wide club competition, the FIBA EuroLeague. With Olympiacos, he competed in a total of four EuroLeague seasons (1992–93, 1993–94, 1994–95, and 1995–96.) During the 1992–93 FIBA EuroLeague season, Papadakos had 10 steals in a game against the Spanish club Real Madrid, and its legendary center, Arvydas Sabonis.

Papadakos moved to the Greek club Peiraikos Syndesmos, for the 1996–97 season. He then moved to the Greek club Panionios Athens, for the 1997–98 season. He finished his pro club playing career with the Greek club Papagou Athens, in the 2000–01 season.

== National team career ==
=== Canada ===
Papadakos was a member of the junior national teams of Canada. With Canada's junior national team, he played at the 1983 FIBA Under-19 World Cup. He also played with Canada's junior national team at the 1985 Summer Universiade, where he won a bronze medal.

=== Greece ===
Papadakos was a member of the senior men's Greek national team. Papadakos played with Greece at the 1991 FIBA EuroBasket. In 5 games played during that tournament, he averaged 8.4 points per game. He also played with Greece at the 1992 FIBA European Olympic Qualifying Tournament. Overall, Papadakos had 22 caps with Greece's senior national team, in which he scored a total of 162 points, for a scoring average of 7.4 points per game.

== Coaching career ==
After he retired from playing professional club basketball, Papadakos worked as a basketball coach.

== Personal life ==
Papadakos' sister, Orthoula, was also a basketball player. Papadakos' son, Johnny, is also a basketball player. Papadakos worked in the sporting goods business in Greece.
