= Nikos Milas =

Greek basketball player and coach (1928–2019)

Personal information
- Born: 9 July 1928 Athens, Greece
- Died: 22 July 2019 (aged 91) Nea Smyrni, Athens, Greece
- Coaching career: 1960–1976

Career history

Playing
- Panathinaikos Athens

Coaching
- 1960–61, 1963–65: Panathinaikos Athens
- 1966–67: Amyntas Athens
- 1967–70: AEK Athens
- 1970–71: Olympiacos Piraeus
- 1973–74: AEK Athens
- 1975–76: Panathinaikos Athens

Career highlights
- As a player: 3× Greek League champion (1950, 1951, 1954); As a head coach: FIBA Saporta Cup champion (1968); 3× Greek League champion (1961, 1968, 1970)
Medals
Representing Greece
EuroBasket
Bronze medal – third place	1949 Egypt	As player

Nikolaos "Nikos" Milas (Greek: Νικόλαος "Νίκος" Μήλας; 9 July 1928 – 22 July 2019) was a Greek basketball player and coach. He was born in Athens.

== Playing career ==
=== Club career ===
Milas was a skilled technical player, with good dribbling and shooting ability. He played with Panathinaikos in his club career. He won three Greek League championships (1949–50, 1950–51, 1953–54).

=== Greece national team ===
Milas played on the Greece men's national basketball team in 8 games at the EuroBasket 1949 in Egypt (where they won a bronze medal), and at the EuroBasket 1951. Milas also played at the 1951 Mediterranean Games, and the 1952 Summer Olympics basketball tournament of Helsinki, (two losses against Hungary and Israel).

== Coaching career ==
In 1961, Milas won the Greek League championship from the post of head coach of Panathinaikos. He was the head coach of AEK, in 1968, when they won the FIBA European Cup Winners' Cup's 1967–68 season championship, in Kallimármaro, Athens, against the Czechoslovak League powerhouse of the sixties, Slavia VŠ Praha.

On the bench of AEK, he also won two Greek League national domestic championships in the 1967–68 and 1969–70 seasons (the 1969–70 title was the last for the club until the 2001–02 season). In the 1969–70 season, Milas also led AEK to the semifinals of the 1969–70 FIBA European Cup Winners' Cup, where his team was defeated by the French League club, Vichy, in a two legged aggregate score series (consisting of a 60–78 loss in France, and a 74–65 win in Athens).

== Personal life ==
Milas died on 22 July 2019, in Nea Smyrni, Athens, Greece. He was 91 years old.
