= Bruno Recoura =

French basketball player and coach (1948–2026)

Personal information
- Born: 20 April 1948
- Died: 18 July 2026 (aged 78)
- Listed height: 6 ft 6 in (1.98 m)

Career information
- Playing career: 1966–?
- Position: Small forward
- Coaching career: 1978–1990

Career history

Playing
- 1966–1978: ASVEL Basket
- 1978–1980: Élan Chalon
- 1981–?: BC Villefranche-sur-Saône

Coaching
- 1978–1980: Élan Chalon
- 1987–1990: ASUL Lyon

Bruno Recoura (French: [bʁynˈo ʁəkuʁˈa]; 20 April 1948 – 18 July 2026) was a French basketball player and coach who played as a small forward.

Recoura spent a majority of his playing career with ASVEL Basket, though he was also a player-coach with Élan Chalon from 1978 to 1980. From 1967 to 1971, he was a member of the French national team, where he played in eight games and scored a total of 17 points.

Recoura died on 18 July 2026, at the age of 78.
