= Alberto Merlati =

Italian basketball player (1943–2024)

Personal information
- Born: 4 July 1943 Cuneo, Italy
- Died: 12 December 2024 (aged 81)

Career information
- Playing career: 1965–1975
- Position: Center

Career history
- 1965–1968: Pallacanestro Cantù
- 1969–1970: Nuova Pallacanestro Gorizia
- 1970–1972: Reyer Venezia
- 1972–1973: Libertas Pallacanestro Asti
- 1973–1975: Auxilium Pallacanestro Torino
Medals
Men's basketball
Representing Italy
Mediterranean Games
Silver medal – second place	1967 Tunis	Basketball

Alberto Merlati (4 July 1943 – 12 December 2024) was an Italian basketball player. He won among others the silver medal at the 1967 Mediterranean Games and won the Lega Basket Serie A. Merlati died on 12 December 2024, at the age of 81.

== Awards ==
- Winner of the Lega Basket Serie A (1968)
- Silver medal at the 1967 Mediterranean Games
