= Periklis Dorkofikis =

Greek basketball player

Personal information
- Born: August 30, 1980 (age 46) Athens, Greece
- Listed height: 6 ft 9.5 in (2.07 m)
- Listed weight: 250 lb (113 kg)

Career information
- Playing career: 1998–2017
- Position: Power forward / center

Career history
- 1998–2002: Olympiacos
- 2002–2003: Peristeri
- 2003–2005: Ionikos NF
- 2005–2006: Scandone Avellino
- 2006–2007: Reggio Emilia
- 2007: Scandone Avellino
- 2007–2008: Olympias Patras
- 2008–2011: AEK Athens
- 2011–2012: Rethymno
- 2012–2014: Ilysiakos
- 2014–2015: Panelefsiniakos
- 2015–2016: Papagou
- 2016–2017: Amyntas
Medals
Men's basketball
Representing Greece
Mediterranean Games
Silver medal – second place	2001 Tunis	Under-26
FIBA Europe Under-18 Championship
Bronze medal – third place	1998 Bulgaria	Under-18

Periklis Dorkofikis (Greek: Περικλής Δορκοφίκης; born August 30, 1980) is a Greek former professional basketball player. At a height of 2.07 m (6'9 1/2") tall, he played at the power forward and center positions.

== Professional career ==
During his pro career, Dorkofikis played in the Greek top-tier level GBL, the Italian top-tier level LBA, and the European-wide top-tier level EuroLeague.

== National team career ==
Dorkofikis played with the junior national teams of Greece at the 1998 FIBA Europe Under-18 Championship, where he won a bronze medal, at the 1999 FIBA Under-19 World Cup, and the 2000 FIBA Europe Under-20 Championship. He also won a silver medal with Greece's under-26 selection at the 2001 Mediterranean Games.
