= Missas Pantazopoulos =

Greek basketball player and coach

Personal information
- Born: 1 January 1924 Greece
- Died: 25 April 2006 (aged 82) Greece

Career history

Playing
- Panellinios
- 1945–1950: Panathinaikos

Coaching
- 1945–1951: Panathinaikos
- 1956–1957: Greece
- 1962–1966: AEK Athens
- 1967–1969: Greece

Career highlights
- As player: 5× Greek League champion (1939, 1940, 1946, 1947, 1950); As head coach: 8× Greek League champion (1946, 1947, 1950, 1951, 1963–1966)
Medals
Men's basketball
Representing Greece
FIBA EuroBasket
Bronze medal – third place	1949 Egypt

Michailis "Missas" Pantazopoulos (alternate spelling: Misas) (Greek: Μιχάλης "Μίσσας" Πανταζόπουλος; 1924 – 25 April 2006) was a Greek professional basketball player and coach.

== Playing career ==
=== Club career ===
During his club career, Pantazopoulos played with the Greek teams Panellionios and Panathinaikos. With Panellinios, he won 2 Greek League championships, in 1939 and 1940. He also won 3 Greek League championships with Panathinaikos, in 1946, 1947, and 1950.

=== National team career ===
Pantazopoulos was a member of the senior Greek national basketball team. With Greece, he won the bronze medal at the 1949 EuroBasket.

== Coaching career ==
=== Clubs ===
During his playing career, Papazoglou was also a player-coach. He continued to work as a basketball coach, after he retired from playing. He was the head coach of the Greek clubs Panathinaikos and AEK Athens. As a head coach, he won a total of 8 Greek League championships.

He won the Greek League championship with Panathinaikos, in 1946, 1947, 1950, and 1951. He also won the Greek League championship with AEK Athens, in 1963, 1964, 1965, and 1966. He also led AEK Athens to the 1966 FIBA European Champions Cup Final Four (1966 EuroLeague Final Four).

=== National team ===
Pantazopoulos was also the head coach of the senior Greek national basketball team. He was Greece's head coach at the 1967 Mediterranean Games, and the 1967 EuroBasket. He also coached Greece at the 1968 and 1969 Balkan Championships.
