= Georgios Trontzos =

Greek basketball player and coach (born 1942)

Personal information
- Born: February 16, 1942 (age 84) Veria, Greece
- Listed height: 7 ft 2 in (2.18 m)
- Listed weight: 240 lb (109 kg)

Career information
- College: Gonzaga (1961–1963)
- Playing career: 1960–1980
- Position: Center
- Number: 6

Career history

Playing
- 1960–1961: HAN Thessaloniki
- 1963–1980: AEK Athens

Coaching
- 1979–1980: AEK Athens

Career highlights
- As a player: 3× FIBA European Selection (1965 2×, 1967); FIBA Cup Winners' Cup champion (1968); 5× Greek League champion (1964–1966, 1968, 1970); No. 6 retired by AEK Athens (2016)
Medals
Men's basketball
Representing Greece
Mediterranean Games
Bronze medal – third place	1971 Turkey
Balkan Championship
Silver medal – second place	1963 Greece
Silver medal – second place	1969 Greece
Bronze medal – third place	1964 Romania
Bronze medal – third place	1966 Bulgaria
Bronze medal – third place	1967 Yugoslavia

Georgios Trontzos (alternate spelling: Giorgos) (Greek: Γιώργος Τρόντζος; ) is a retired Greek professional basketball player and basketball coach. At a height of 2.18 m (7'2"), he played at the center position. In honor of his great contributions to the club as a player, his number 6 jersey was retired by AEK Athens.

== College career ==
Trontzos played college basketball in the United States at Gonzaga University, with the Gonzaga Bulldogs. He was the second 7-footer in the school's history after Jean Claude Lefebvre, a 7'3" French native, who arrived at Gonzaga in the fall of 1957.

== Club career ==
Trontzos started playing basketball with HAN Thessaloniki (YMCA). He then moved to the Greek club AEK Athens. With AEK, he won 5 Greek League championships (1964, 1965, 1966, 1968, 1970).

He also helped lead the team to the final four of the FIBA European Champions Cup of the 1965–66 season, which was the first time that the EuroLeague ever used a final four system, thus helping to lead a Greek team to a final four in the EuroLeague for the first time ever. He also helped to lead AEK to the championship of the European-wide 2nd-tier level FIBA European Cup Winners' Cup of the 1967–68 season, which was the first European championship won by any Greek team. He scored 24 points in the tournament's final game.

He also played in the Greek Cup Final with AEK twice, in the years 1976 and 1978. He was a member of the FIBA European Selection team, in the years 1965 and 1967.

== National team career ==
Trontzos was also a member of the senior men's Greek national basketball team. In 136 caps played with Greece's senior men's team, he scored 1,543 points, for an average of 11.3 points per game. He played at the FIBA EuroBasket 1965, the FIBA EuroBasket 1967, the FIBA EuroBasket 1969, and the FIBA EuroBasket 1973. He also played at the FIBA Olympic Qualifying Tournaments of 1964 and 1968.

He also played at the Mediterranean Games in 1967 and 1971.

== Coaching career ==
Trontzos also coached AEK Athens, which he led to the final of the Greek Cup in 1980.
