= Georgios Oikonomou =

Greek basketball player

Georgios "Giorgos" Oikonomou (alternate spellings: Ikonomou, Economou, Ekonomou; Greek: Γεώργιος "Γιώργος" Οικονόμου, born 1938) is a retired Greek basketball player and coach who spend his entire career at PAOK from 1956 to 1972.

== Club career ==
As a basketball player, he was 2.03 m. tall and the first center in Greece taller than 2 metres. During his career, he was the most valuable player of PAOK. He led his team to win its first Greek Basket League championship in 1959. At the final game against Aris Thessaloniki Oikonomou scored 25 points, 19 being in the second half and helped his team to win the game 66–58.

Moreover, Oikonomou was the third scorer of Greek Basket League in 1965 and 1970. In April 2015, PAOK awarded Oikonomou for his offer to the club.

=== Greek national team ===
Oikonomou has 25 caps with the Greece national basketball team and scored 160 points. He took part in EuroBasket 1961, the Balkan Championship 1962 and 1963, the 1960 Pre-Olympic Basketball Tournament and the 1964 Pre-Olympic Basketball Tournament.
