= Panagiotis Fasoulas =

Greek politician and former basketball player

Mayor of Piraeus
- In office 1 January 2007 – 1 January 2011
- Deputy: Vicky Leandros
- Preceded by: Christos Agrapidis
- Succeeded by: Vasileios Michaloliakos

MP of 1st Piraeus periphery
- In office 2000–2006

1st City councilman, Thessaloniki
- In office 1990–1993

Personal details
- Born: 12 May 1963 (age 63) Thessaloniki, Greece
- Party: PASOK
- Spouse: Masa Zacharia
- Children: Mariella Fasoula, John
- Occupation: Basketball player
- Basketball career

Personal information
- Listed height: 7 ft 0 in (2.13 m)
- Listed weight: 220 lb (100 kg)

Career information
- College: Hellenic College (1980–1982); NC State (1985–1986)
- NBA draft: 1986: 2nd round, 37th overall pick
- Drafted by: Portland Trail Blazers
- Playing career: 1981–1999
- Position: Center
- Number: 13, 10

Career history
- 1981–1993: PAOK
- 1993–1999: Olympiacos

Career highlights
- European Triple Crown winner (1997); EuroLeague champion (1997); 4× FIBA European Selection (1990, 1991 2×, 1995); FIBA EuroStar (1996); FIBA European Cup Winners' Cup champion (1991); 5× Greek League champion (1992, 1994–1997); 3× Greek Cup winner (1984, 1994, 1997); 2× Greek League MVP (1994, 1995); Greek League Finals MVP (1992); 3× Greek All-Star (1991, 1994 II, 1996 II); Greek League rebounding leader (1987); 2× Greek League blocks leader (1994, 1997); Greek League Hall of Fame (2022); Greek League career stats leaders: Greek League all-time leader in blocks
- Stats at Basketball Reference
- FIBA Hall of Fame
Medals
Event	1st	2nd	3rd
FIBA EuroBasket	1	1	0
Balkan Championship	1	1	2
Total	2	2	2
Men's basketball
Representing Greece
FIBA EuroBasket
Gold medal – first place	1987 Greece	
Silver medal – second place	1989 Yugoslavia	
Balkan Championship
Gold medal – first place	1986 Bulgaria	
Silver medal – second place	1983 Yugoslavia	
Bronze medal – third place	1984 Greece	
Bronze medal – third place	1981 Romania	

Panagiotis "Panos" Fasoulas (alternate spelling: Fassoulas; Greek: Παναγιώτης Φασούλας; born 12 May 1963, in Thessaloniki) is a Greek politician, and former professional basketball player. He was selected in the second round, with the 37th overall pick, by the Portland Trail Blazers, in the 1986 NBA draft. However, he never decided to play in the NBA. During his pro club career, Fasoulas won multiple team titles and individual awards.

In 1997, as a member of the Greek club Olympiacos Piraeus, Fasoulas won the EuroLeague championship at the 1997 EuroLeague Final Four. He also won the European Triple Crown title that same year. On a personal level, he was a four-time FIBA European Selection, as well as a FIBA EuroStar. With the senior Greek national team, Fasoulas won the gold medal at the 1987 FIBA EuroBasket, where he was also an All-Tournament Team selection.

Widely considered to be one of the best centers in the history of European basketball, Fasoulas became a FIBA Hall of Fame player in 2016. In 2022, he was also inducted into the Greek League Hall of Fame.

== Basketball career ==
=== College career ===
As a youth, Fasoulas moved from Greece, to play college basketball in the United States. He first played college ball at the Hellenic College. He was recruited to the school by its head coach at the time, Dick Dukeshire, who had previously worked as a coach in Greece. Fasoulas played two seasons with the school's men's basketball team, the Hellenic College Owls.

Fasoulas then played college ball at North Carolina State University, with the N.C. State Wolfpack. At NC State, he played under legendary head coach Jim Valvano. In his sole season with the Wolfpack (1985–86), Fasoulas averaged 2.8 points and 3.2 rebounds per game, and he also led the team with 1.8 blocks per game, in 29 games played.

=== Professional career ===
During his professional career, Fasoulas played for PAOK Thessaloniki and Olympiacos Piraeus. With PAOK, he won the FIBA Cup Winners' Cup championship in the 1990–91 season. With Olympiacos, he won the EuroLeague championship and the Triple Crown in the 1996–97 season. He was named to the FIBA European Selection four times, in the years 1990, 1991 (twice), and 1995. He was also named a FIBA EuroStar in 1996.

At the national domestic level, Fasoulas won 5 Greek League championships and 3 Greek Cups. He was named the Greek League Finals MVP in 1992, and was also named the Greek League MVP in 1994 and 1995. He led the Greek League in rebounding in 1987, and in blocked shots in 1994 and 1997. Fasoulas was inducted into the Greek League Hall of Fame in 2022.

=== National team career ===
Fasoulas was also a member of the senior Greek national team, where he was the starting center during Greece's 1987 FIBA EuroBasket gold medal victory, being also named to the All-Tournament Team. He also won the silver medal with Greece at the 1989 FIBA EuroBasket. In Toronto, Canada, at the 1994 FIBA World Championship, where Greece finished in fourth place, Fasoulas played the best basketball of his career. In total, Fasoulas appeared in 244 games for Greece, averaging 9.77 points per game. He is second all-time in games played and third all-time in points scored for Greece's senior men's team.

Fasoulas played with Greece at the following major FIBA tournaments: the 1983 FIBA EuroBasket, the 1984 FIBA European Olympic Qualifying Tournament, the 1987 FIBA EuroBasket, the 1988 FIBA European Olympic Qualifying Tournament, the 1989 FIBA EuroBasket, the 1990 FIBA World Cup, the 1991 FIBA EuroBasket, the 1992 FIBA European Olympic Qualifying Tournament, the 1993 FIBA EuroBasket, the 1994 FIBA World Cup, the 1995 FIBA EuroBasket, the 1996 Summer Olympics, and the 1998 FIBA World Cup.

He also represented Greece at the 1981 Balkan Championship, the 1982 Balkan Championship, the 1983 Balkan Championship, the 1983 Mediterranean Games, the 1984 Balkan Championship, and the 1986 Balkan Championship.

=== Managerial career ===
After his basketball playing career ended, Fasoulas became a basketball executive. He became the sports director of Olympiacos Women, of the Greek Women's League and the EuroLeague Women.

== Awards and accomplishments ==
=== Club titles ===
- European Triple Crown Winner: 1 (with Olympiacos: (1997)
- EuroLeague Champion: 1 (with Olympiacos: 1997)
- FIBA Cup Winners' Cup Winner: 1 (with PAOK: 1991)
- Greek League Champion: 5 (with PAOK: 1992 and Olympiacos: 1994, 1995, 1996, 1997)
- Greek Cup Winner: 3 (with PAOK: 1984 and Olympiacos: 1994, 1997)

=== Other honors ===
- EuroLeague Finalist: 3 (with Olympiacos: 1994, 1995, 1997)
- EuroLeague Runner-up: 2 (with Olympiacos: 1994, 1995)
- EuroLeague Final Four Participation: 5 (with PAOK 1993 and Olympiacos: 1994, 1995, 1997, 1999)

=== Greece national team ===
- 1981 Balkan Championship: Bronze
- 1983 Balkan Championship: Silver
- 1984 Balkan Championship: Bronze
- 1986 Balkan Championship: Gold
- 1987 FIBA EuroBasket: Gold
- 1989 FIBA EuroBasket: Silver

=== Personal awards ===
- FIBA EuroBasket All-Tournament Team: (1987)
- FIBA European Selection: 4 (1990, 1991 2×, 1995)
- FIBA EuroStar: 1 (1996)
- Greek League Finals MVP: (1992)
- Greek League MVP: 2 (1994, 1995)
- Greek League All-Star: 3 (1991, 1994 II, 1996 II)
- Greek League Rebounding Leader: (1987)
- 2× Greek League Blocks Leader: (1994, 1997)
- Professional Greek League all-time leader in blocks
- FIBA Hall of Fame: (2016)
- Greek League Hall of Fame: (2022)

== Political career ==
A charismatic personality, Fasoulas entered politics after retiring from sport, joining the political party of PASOK. He contributed in the organization of the Summer Olympic Games in Athens, in 2004. He was elected Mayor of Piraeus on 15 October 2006, and served as Mayor through 2010.

== See also ==
- PASOK
- PAOK
- Olympiacos
- 1987 FIBA EuroBasket
