= Christos Zoupas =

Greek professional basketball player

Personal information
- Born: November 26, 1944 (age 81) Kingdom of Greece
- Listed height: 5 ft 11 in (1.80 m)
- Listed weight: 205 lb (93 kg)

Career information
- Playing career: 1960–1974
- Position: Point guard
- Number: 8

Career history
- 1960–1962: Amyntas
- 1962–1974: AEK Athens

Career highlights
- FIBA European Selection (1966); FIBA Cup Winners' Cup Champion (1968); 5× Greek League Champion (1964–1966, 1968, 1970)
Medals
Representing Greece
Men's basketball
Balkan Championship
Silver medal – second place	1963 Greece
Silver medal – second place	1969 Greece
Bronze medal – third place	1966 Bulgaria
Bronze medal – third place	1967 Yugoslavia

Christos Zoupas (Greek: Χρήστος Ζούπας, born 26 November 1944) is a retired Greek professional basketball player. At a height of 1.80 m (5 ft 11 in), he played at the point guard position.

== Club career ==
Zoupas started playing club basketball with Amyntas in 1960. He then moved to the Greek club AEK Athens in 1962. With AEK, he won 5 Greek League championships (1964, 1965, 1966, 1968, 1970).

He also played in the final four of the FIBA European Champions Cup of the 1965–66 season, which was the first time that the EuroLeague ever used a final four system, thus he was a part of the first Greek team to play in a final four in the EuroLeague. He was also a member of the FIBA European Selection team in the year 1966.

Zoupas also helped AEK win the championship of the 2nd-tier level FIBA Cup Winners' Cup of the 1967–68 season, which was the first European championship won by any Greek team, in any sport. He scored 12 points in the tournament's final game.

== National team career ==
Zoupas was also a member of the senior men's Greek national team. With Greece, he played at several Balkan Championships, the 1967 Mediterranean Games, the 1967 EuroBasket, and the 1969 EuroBasket In total, he had 52 caps (games played) with Greece's senior men's team, in which he scored a total of 352 points, for a scoring average of 6.8 points per game.

== Personal life ==
Zoupas' family originated from Northern Epirus. Zoupas studied medicine, and graduated from the Athens University Medical School, in 1969. He later worked as a medical doctor, specializing in Endocrinology.

Zoupas was the President of the sports club Vouliagmeni, from 1996 to 1998. During his presidency, the club won the water polo LEN Cup Winners' Cup title, in 1997. Zoupas was elected the mayor of Ymittos, in October 2006.

His daughter Maria, is married to the Greek former water polo player Georgios Afroudakis.
