= Dimitrios Taliadoros =

Greek basketball player

Takis Taliadoros
Personal information
- Full name: Dimitrios Taliadoros
- Nationality: Greek
- Born: 1925 Thessaloniki, Greece
- Died: 25 May 2011 (aged 85–86)

Sport
- Sport: Basketball

Dimitrios "Takis" Taliadoros (Greek: Δημήτριος «Τάκης» Ταλιαδώρος; 1 February 1925 – 25 May 2011) was a Greek multi-sport athlete, mostly known as a basketball player. He is regarded as one of the greatest Greek players of the 20th century.

Besides basketball, Taliadoros also competed in other sports including volleyball, swimming and table tennis.

== Biography ==
=== Career ===
Taliadoros was born in 1925 in Thessaloniki. During his childhood, he joined the local chapter of the YMCA (HANTH) where he participated in various sports, mainly in basketball. He spent almost his entire career in HANTH sport departments except the 1939–1946 period, when the organisation was forcibly dissolved by Metaxas regime and its facilities were confiscated. During those years, Taliadoros joined Iraklis volleyball team and Thessaloniki Sailing Club.

After the end of World War II, Taliadoros returned to his initial club, becoming a key player and the leading scorer of HANTH BC. With HANTH, he won 9 consecutive regional Thessaloniki Championship titles (from 1946 to 1954), and participated in various Panhellenic Championships. Taliadoros retired in 1954, although he briefly returned to action in 1961 in order to help the club to avoid relegation to the Second Division of Thessaloniki Championship.

Beyond basketball, Taliadoros played various sports, including table tennis where he became a regional champion with HANTH men's department.

=== National team career ===
Taliadoros played in 31 FIBA-recognised games with the Greece national team, scoring a total of 147 points. With Greece, he won the bronze medal at the 1949 EuroBasket. In addition, he played at 1951 EuroBasket, the 1951 Mediterranean Games, and the 1952 Summer Olympics.

=== Player profile ===
Taliadoros is regarded as one of the greatest players during the early stages of basketball in Greece, and also one of the best Greek power forwards of the 20th century. Standing at 190cm, Taliadoros flourished at the power forward position, although he could also play as center. A prolific scorer, he was also praised for his quickness, ball handling abilities, and movement inside the paint. Moreover he is considered by some sources as the fist Greek player who performed jump shot and reverse dribble.

=== After retirement ===
After his athletic career, Taliadoros had a bried stint as PAOK BC head coach, and later, he served as Hellenic Basketball Federation vice-president. He died on 25 May 2011.
