= Dinos Angelidis =

Greek basketball player (born 1969)

Personal information
- Born: 5 April 1969 (age 57) Vienna, Austria
- Listed height: 6 ft 10 in (2.08 m)
- Listed weight: 250 lb (113 kg)

Career information
- NBA draft: 1991: undrafted
- Playing career: 1985–2001
- Position: Power forward / center
- Number: 9, 12

Career history
- 1985–1990: Sporting
- 1990–1999: Aris
- 1999–2000: PAOK
- 2000–2001: Dafni

Career highlights
- FIBA European Cup champion (1993); FIBA Korać Cup champion (1997); Greek League champion (1991); 2× Greek Cup winner (1992, 1998); 3× Greek League All-Star (1996 I, 1996 II, 1997)
Medals
Men's basketball
Representing Greece
FIBA EuroBasket
Silver medal – second place	1989 Yugoslavia
Mediterranean Games
Silver medal – second place	1991 Greece	Under-26

Konstantinos "Dinos" Angelidis (Greek: Κωνσταντίνος "Ντίνος" Αγγελίδης; born 5 April 1969) is an Austrian-born former Greek professional basketball player of mixed Greek-Austrian descent. Born in Vienna, he played professionally in the Greek Basket League, and he also represented the Greek national team at the senior level. He played as either a power forward or center.

== Professional career ==
Angelidis started his club basketball career at Sporting, in 1985. In 1990, he was acquired by Aris of Thessaloniki. Over the next nine years, Angelidis played for the team that was at the time known as "The Emperor" of Greek basketball. With Aris, he won the European second-tier level FIBA European Cup Winners' Cup championship in the 1992–93 season, and the European third-tier level FIBA Korać Cup championship in the 1996–97 season. On the domestic front, he won the Greek League championship in 1991, and two Greek Cup titles, in 1992 and 1998. He served as Aris' team captain for part of that time.

His playing career was marred by his failure to pass an anti-doping test, on 12 May 1999, prior to a game against PAOK, which caused Aris have to forfeit that game. The following year, Angelidis transferred to PAOK, where he played just one season (1999–2000). He also played with Dafni, before retiring from playing pro club basketball in 2001.

== National team career ==
During his playing career, Angelidis had a total of 81 caps with the senior Greek national team, in which he scored a total of 645 points, for a scoring average of 8.0 points per game. He was a member of the Greek national squad that won the silver medal at the 1989 EuroBasket, which took place at Zagreb, Croatia. He also won the silver medal at the 1991 Mediterranean Games.

Angelidis also competed with Greece at the 1991 EuroBasket, the 1992 FIBA European Olympic Qualifying Tournament, the 1995 EuroBasket, and the 1996 Summer Olympics.

== Personal life ==
Angelidis was born in Vienna, Austria, to a Greek father and an Austrian mother. He graduated from the German School of Athens.
