= Vassilis Lipiridis =

Greek basketball player (born 1967)

Personal information
- Born: January 1, 1967 (age 59) Edessa, Greece
- Listed height: 6 ft 7.5 in (2.02 m)

Career information
- Playing career: 1984–1998
- Position: Power forward / center

Career history
- 1984–1985: HAN Thessaloniki
- 1985–1996: Aris Thessaloniki
- 1996: MENT
- 1997–1998: OFI

Career highlights
- 6× Greek League champion (1986–1991); 5× Greek Cup winner (1987–1990, 1992); Saporta Cup champion (1993)

Vassilis Lipiridis (alternate spellings: Vasilis, Lypiridis; Greek: Βασίλης Λυπηρίδης; born January 1, 1967) is a Greek former professional basketball player. At 2.02 m (6 ft 7 1/2 in) tall, he played at the power forward position.

== Professional career ==
Lipridis started his basketball playing career with the youth clubs of Edessaikos. He spent one season with HAN Thessaloniki, during the 1984–85 season.

Lipiridis played with great success as a defensive power forward with Aris, winning with them, the Greek League championship six times (1986, 1987, 1988, 1989, 1990, 1991) and the Greek Cup 5 times (1987, 1988, 1989, 1990, 1992).

He also took part in 3 consecutive Final Fours of the FIBA European Champions Cup: Ghent 1988, Munich 1989, and Zaragoza 1990. While he played there, Aris joined the elite of European basketball clubs, but a European-wide title did not come for Lipiridis until much later, in 1993, when the club won the 2nd-tier level FIBA European Cup in Turin.

In 1996, Lipiridis joined MENT, for some months, and in 1997, he joined OFI basketball club, for one season.

== National team career ==
Lipiridis was a member of the senior men's Greek national basketball team that finished in 6th place at the 1990 FIBA World Championship. He also played at the EuroBasket 1991.

== Awards and accomplishments ==
- 6× Greek League Champion: (1986, 1987, 1988, 1989, 1990, 1991)
- 5× Greek Cup Winner: (1987, 1988, 1989, 1990, 1992)
- Saporta Cup Champion: (1993)
