= Francis Jordane =

French basketball coach (1946–2025)

Personal information
- Born: 29 March 1946 Arles-sur-Tech, France
- Died: 11 November 2025 (aged 79) Perpignan, France
- Coaching career: 1968–2010

Career history

Coaching
- 1968–1970: Saint Joseph Mulhouse
- 1970–1982: SI Graffenstaden
- 1983–1984: France Juniors (associate head coach)
- 1984–1986: France (assistant)
- 1986–1993: France
- 2000–2001: Tunisia
- 2009: Morocco
- 2010: Perpignan

Francis Jordane (French: [fʁɑ̃sis ʒɔʁdan]; 29 March 1946 – 11 November 2025) was a French basketball coach.

An amateur basketball player in his youth, he notably coached the men's national basketball teams of France, Tunisia, and Morocco before retiring in 2011. He was known to contribute to the organization Trobada Basket en Vallespir in Céret.

Jordane died in Perpignan on 11 November 2025, at the age of 79.

== Publication ==
- Basket performance (with Josep Martin, 2001)
