= EuroBasket 1989 =

International basketball event

Европско првенство у кошарци 1989. Europsko prvenstvo u košarci 1989.

Tournament details
- Host country: Yugoslavia
- City: Zagreb
- Dates: 20–25 June
- Teams: 8
- Venue: 1 (in 1 host city)

Final positions
- Champions: Yugoslavia (4th title)
- Runners-up: Greece
- Third place: Soviet Union
- Fourth place: Italy

Tournament statistics
- Games played: 20
- MVP: (Socialist Federal Republic of Yugoslavia) Dražen Petrović
- Top scorer: (Greece) Nikos Galis (35.6 points per game)

The 1989 FIBA European Championship, commonly called FIBA EuroBasket 1989, was the 26th FIBA EuroBasket regional basketball championship, held by FIBA Europe. It was held in Yugoslavia between 20 and 25 June 1989. Eight national teams entered the event under the auspices of FIBA Europe, the sport's regional governing body. The Dom Sportova in Zagreb was the hosting venue of the tournament. The host, Yugoslavia, won its fourth FIBA European title by defeating the defending champions Greece, with a 98–77 score in the final. Yugoslavia's Dražen Petrović was voted the tournament's MVP. The five best teams in the final standings were given berths to the 1990 FIBA World Championship.

== Venues ==
All games were played at the Dom Sportova in Zagreb.

| EuroBasket 1989 is located in Yugoslavia | Dom Sportova; Opened in 1972 |

== Qualification ==
| Competition | Date | Vacancies | Qualified |
|---|---|---|---|
| Qualified through Qualifying Round | 3 September 1987 – 1 December 1988 | 8 | Bulgaria; France; Greece; Italy; Netherlands; Soviet Union; Spain; Yugoslavia |

== Format ==
- The teams were split in two groups of four teams each. The top two teams from each group advance to the semifinals. The winners in the knockout semifinals advance to the Final, and the losers figure in a third-place playoff.
- The third and fourth teams from each group competed in another bracket to define 5th through 8th place in the final standings.

== Preliminary round ==
| Qualified for the semifinals |

=== Group A ===
Times given below are in Central European Summer Time (UTC+2).

| Team | Pld | W | L | PF | PA | PD | Pts |
|---|---|---|---|---|---|---|---|
| Soviet Union | 3 | 3 | 0 | 304 | 236 | +68 | 6 |
| Italy | 3 | 2 | 1 | 270 | 229 | +41 | 5 |
| Spain | 3 | 1 | 2 | 250 | 281 | −31 | 4 |
| Netherlands | 3 | 0 | 3 | 198 | 276 | −78 | 3 |

20 June
16:30

Boxscore

| Netherlands | 76–78 | Spain |
Scoring by half: 49–29, 27–49
| Pts: Kuipers 19 | | Pts: Jiménez 19 |

Dom Sportova, Zagreb
Referees: Lubomir Kotleba (TCH), Philippe Mailhabiau (FRA)

20 June
19:30

Boxscore

| Italy | 84–87 | Soviet Union |
Scoring by half: 34–54, 50–33
| Pts: Riva 31 | | Pts: Marčiulionis 23 |

Dom Sportova, Zagreb
Attendance: 10,000
Referees: Lubomir Kotleba (TCH), Peter George (FRG)

21 June
14:00

Boxscore

| Soviet Union | 109–56 | Netherlands |
Scoring by half: 46–32, 63–24
| Pts: Berežnyj, Sokk, Vētra 14 | | Pts: van Poelgeest 15 |

Dom Sportova, Zagreb
Referees: Danko Radić (YUG), Kamen Toshev (BUL)

21 June
21:00

Boxscore

| Spain | 76–97 | Italy |
Scoring by half: 39–41, 37–56
| Pts: Martínez 20 | | Pts: Riva 33 |

Dom Sportova, Zagreb
Attendance: 4,000
Referees: David Dodge (USA), Costas Rigas (GRE)

22 June
16:00

Boxscore

| Netherlands | 66–89 | Italy |
Scoring by half: 23–36, 43–53
| Pts: te Velde 25 | | Pts: Riva 21 |

Dom Sportova, Zagreb
Referees: Mickey Crowley (USA), Danko Radić (YUG)

22 June
21:00

Boxscore

| Soviet Union | 108–96 | Spain |
Scoring by half: 47–55, 61–41
| Pts: Sabonis 27 | | Pts: San Epifanio 26 |

Dom Sportova, Zagreb
Referees: Lubomir Kotleba (TCH), Philippe Mailhabiau (FRA)

=== Group B ===
| Team | Pld | W | L | PF | PA | PD | Pts |
|---|---|---|---|---|---|---|---|
| Yugoslavia | 3 | 3 | 0 | 307 | 235 | +72 | 6 |
| Greece | 3 | 2 | 1 | 251 | 250 | +1 | 5 |
| France | 3 | 1 | 2 | 272 | 264 | +8 | 4 |
| Bulgaria | 3 | 0 | 3 | 229 | 310 | −81 | 3 |

20 June
14:20

Boxscore

| France | 109–78 | Bulgaria |
Scoring by half: 59–30, 50–48
| Pts: Dacoury 32 | | Pts: Antov 19 |

Dom Sportova, Zagreb
Referees: Mikhail Davydov (URS), Vittorio Fiorito (ITA)

20 June
21:30

Boxscore

| Yugoslavia | 103–68 | Greece |
Scoring by half: 49–35, 54–33
| Pts: Petrović 35 | | Pts: Galis 30 |

Dom Sportova, Zagreb
Referees: David Dodge (USA), Vicente Sanchís (ESP)

21 June
16:00

Boxscore

| Greece | 80–74 | France |
Scoring by half: 42–33, 38–41
| Pts: Galis 30 | | Pts: Ostrowski 29 |

Dom Sportova, Zagreb
Referees: Mickey Crowley (USA), Carl Jungebrand (FIN)

21 June
19:00

Boxscore

| Bulgaria | 78–98 | Yugoslavia |
Scoring by half: 42–54, 36–44
| Pts: Mladenov 23 | | Pts: Petrović 33 |

Dom Sportova, Zagreb
Referees: Lubomir Kotleba (TCH), Henk Kleersnyder (NED)

22 June
14:00

Boxscore

| Greece | 103–73 | Bulgaria |
Scoring by half: 58–35, 45–38
| Pts: Galis 43 | | Pts: Mladenov 29 |

Dom Sportova, Zagreb
Referees: Vicente Sanchís (ESP), Vittorio Fiorito (ITA)

22 June
19:00

Boxscore

| France | 89–106 | Yugoslavia |
Scoring by half: 48–41, 41–65
| Pts: Dacoury 28 | | Pts: Petrović 30 |

Dom Sportova, Zagreb
Referees: Mikhail Davydov (URS), Henk Kleersnyder (NED)

== Knockout stage ==
=== Championship bracket ===
Semifinals
24 June – 19:00
Yugoslavia | 97
Italy | 80
24 June – 21:00
Greece | 81
Soviet Union | 80

Final
25 June – 21:00
Yugoslavia | 98
Greece | 77
Third place
25 June – 19:00
Italy | 76
Soviet Union | 104

==== Semifinals ====
24 June
19:00

Boxscore

| Yugoslavia | 97–80 | Italy |
Scoring by half: 52–43, 45–37
| Pts: Petrović 24 | | Pts: Dell'Agnello 13 |

Dom Sportova, Zagreb
Attendance: 10,000
Referees: Vicente Sanchís (ESP), Mickey Crowley (USA)

24 June
21:00

Boxscore

| Greece | 81–80 | Soviet Union |
Scoring by half: 45–44, 36–36
| Pts: Galis 45 | | Pts: Tikhonenko 22 |

Dom Sportova, Zagreb
Attendance: 10,000
Referees: Carl Jungenbrand (FIN), David Dodge (USA)

==== Third place ====
25 June
19:00

Boxscore

| Italy | 76–104 | Soviet Union |
Scoring by half: 31–47, 45–57
| Pts: Magnifico 27 | | Pts: Marčiulionis 23 |

Dom Sportova, Zagreb
Attendance: 10,000
Referees: Lubomir Kotleba (TCH), Costas Rigas (GRE)

==== Final ====
25 June
21:00

Boxscore

| Yugoslavia | 98–77 | Greece |
Scoring by half: 54–35, 44–42
| Pts: Petrović 28 | | Pts: Galis 30 |

Dom Sportova, Zagreb
Attendance: 10,000
Referees: Mickey Crowley (USA), Carl Jungenbrand (FIN)

=== 5th to 8th place ===
Classification round
24 June – 14:00
France | 107
Netherlands | 100
24 June – 16:00
Bulgaria | 85
Spain | 108

Fifth place
25 June – 16:00
France | 87
Spain | 95
Seventh place
25 June – 14:00
Netherlands | 86
Bulgaria | 91

24 June
14:00

Boxscore

| France | 107–100 (OT) | Netherlands |
Scoring by half: 53–41, 38–50 Overtime: 16–9
| Pts: Ostrowski 31 | | Pts: de Waard 20 |

Dom Sportova, Zagreb
Attendance: 3,200
Referees: Vittorio Fiorito (ITA), Kamen Toshev (BUL)

24 June
16:00

Boxscore

| Bulgaria | 85–108 | Spain |
Scoring by half: 47–60, 38–48
| Pts: Antov 30 | | Pts: Martínez 27 |

Dom Sportova, Zagreb
Attendance: 4,000
Referees: Costas Rigas (GRE), Danko Radić (YUG)

25 June
14:00

Boxscore

| Netherlands | 86–91 | Bulgaria |
Scoring by half: 34–40, 52–51
| Pts: de Waard 24 | | Pts: Antov 22 |

Dom Sportova, Zagreb
Attendance: 3,200
Referees: Philippe Mailhabiau (FRA), Vicente Sanchís (ESP)

25 June
16:00

Boxscore

| France | 87–95 | Spain |
Scoring by half: 40–45, 47–50
| Pts: Dacoury 20 | | Pts: San Epifanio 22 |

Dom Sportova, Zagreb
Referees: Mikhail Davydov (URS), Vittorio Fiorito (ITA)

== Awards ==
1989 FIBA EuroBasket champions

Yugoslavia
4th title

1989 FIBA EuroBasket MVP: Dražen Petrović ( (Socialist Federal Republic of Yugoslavia) Yugoslavia)

All-Tournament Team
(Greece) Nikos Galis
(Socialist Federal Republic of Yugoslavia) Dražen Petrović (MVP)
(Socialist Federal Republic of Yugoslavia) Žarko Paspalj
(France) Stéphane Ostrowski
(Socialist Federal Republic of Yugoslavia) Dino Rađa

== Final standings ==
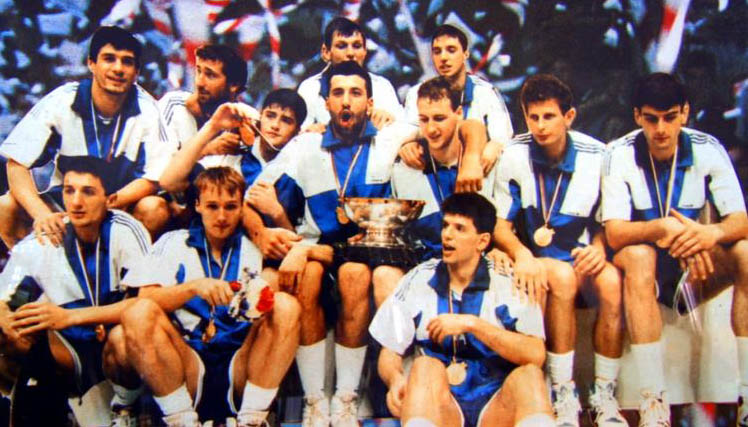
Yugoslavia, champions

| Qualified for the 1990 FIBA World Championship |

| Rank | Team | Record |
|---|---|---|
| 1st place, gold medalist(s) | Yugoslavia | 5–0 |
| 2nd place, silver medalist(s) | Greece | 3–2 |
| 3rd place, bronze medalist(s) | Soviet Union | 4–1 |
| 4 | Italy | 2–3 |
| 5 | Spain | 3–2 |
| 6 | France | 2–3 |
| 7 | Bulgaria | 1–4 |
| 8 | Netherlands | 0–5 |

| 1st | 2nd | 3rd | 4th |
| Yugoslavia Dražen Petrović; Zdravko Radulović; Zoran Čutura; Toni Kukoč; Žarko Paspalj; Jure Zdovc; Zoran Radović; Stojko Vranković; Vlade Divac; Predrag Danilović; Dino Rađa; Mario Primorac | Greece Nikos Galis; Kostas Patavoukas; Panagiotis Giannakis; Argiris Kambouris; David Stergakos; Dinos Angelidis; John Korfas; Nikos Filippou; Liveris Andritsos; Panagiotis Fasoulas; Dimitris Papadopoulos; Fanis Christodoulou | Soviet Union Gundars Vētra; Tiit Sokk; Viktor Berežnyj; Šarūnas Marčiulionis; Alexander Volkov; Valeri Tikhonenko; Rimas Kurtinaitis; Arvydas Sabonis; El'šad Gadašev; Valdemaras Chomičius; Alexander Belostenny; Valery Goborov | Italy Andrea Gracis; Mike D'Antoni; Walter Magnifico; Sandro Dell'Agnello; Beppe Bosa; Roberto Brunamonti; Massimo Iacopini; Gus Binelli; Antonello Riva; Riccardo Morandotti; Ario Costa; Flavio Carera |
