= Lefteris Kakiousis =

Greek coach and former basketball player

Personal information
- Born: 7 June 1968 (age 58) Thessaloniki, Greece
- Listed height: 6 ft 2.5 in (1.89 m)
- Listed weight: 180 lb (82 kg)

Career information
- Playing career: 1987–2001
- Position: Point guard / shooting guard
- Number: 5, 7
- Coaching career: 2001–2024

Career history

Playing
- 1987–1997: Iraklis Thessaloniki
- 1997–1999: P.A.O.K.
- 2000–2001: Makedonikos Neapoli

Coaching
- 2001–2002: Makedonikos Neapoli
- 2002–2005: Iraklis Thessaloniki
- 2004–2008: Greece (assistant)
- 2005–2006: A.E.K.
- 2006–2007: Maroussi (assistant)
- 2009–2010; 2024: Iraklis Thessaloniki

Career highlights
- As player: Greek Cup winner (1999); 2× Greek League All-Star (1996 I, 1996 II); Greek League assists leader (1995); As head coach: Greek 2nd Division champion (2002); As assistant coach: FIBA EuroStars (2007)
Medals
Men's Basketball (Assistant coach)
Representing Greece
FIBA Basketball World Cup
Silver medal – second place	2006 Japan
EuroBasket
Gold medal – first place	2005 Serbia

Lefteris Kakiousis (alternate spelling: Eleftherios) (Greek: Λευτέρης Κακιούσης; born 7 June 1968 in Thessaloniki, Greece) is a Greek former professional basketball player and coach. During his playing career, he played at the point guard and shooting guard positions.

== Playing career ==
=== Clubs ===
Kakiousis began his professional club career in 1987, with the Greek club Iraklis Thessaloniki. His moved to the Greek club P.A.O.K. in 1997. With P.A.O.K., he won the Greek Cup title in 1999. He finished his playing career with the Greek club Makedonikos Neapoli.

=== Greece national team ===
With the senior Greek national team, Kakiousis played at the 1993 EuroBasket, the 1995 EuroBasket, and the 1996 Summer Olympic Games. In total, he represented Greece at the senior level in 44 games, in which he averaged 3.6 points per game.

== Coaching career ==
Kakiousis began his club coaching career, as the head coach of the Greek club Makedonikos Neapoli in 2001. With Makedonikos Neapoli, he won the Greek 2nd Division championship, with a 24–2 record in the 2001–02 season. In 2002, he joined Iraklis Thessaloniki, and he led the club to a third-place finish in the Greek Basketball League's 2003–04 season. In 2005, he became the head coach of A.E.K., and in 2006, he became the assistant coach of Maroussi. In 2009, he once again took the head coaching job with Iraklis Thessaloniki.

Kakiousis was also an assistant coach for the Greece men's national team that won the gold medal at 2005 EuroBasket, and the silver medal at the 2006 FIBA World Championship.

== Awards and accomplishments ==
=== Player ===
- Greek Cup Winner: (1999)
- 2× Greek League All-Star: (1996 I, 1996 II)

=== Head coach ===
- Greek 2nd Division Champion: (2002)

=== Assistant coach ===
- 2005 EuroBasket: Gold
- 2006 FIBA World Championship: Silver
- FIBA EuroStars: (2007)
