= Nikos Filippou =

Greek basketball player

Personal information
- Born: July 15, 1962 (age 64) Ioannina, Greece
- Listed height: 6 ft 7.5 in (2.02 m)
- Listed weight: 240 lb (109 kg)

Career information
- Playing career: 1982–1994
- Position: Power forward

Career history
- 1982–1991: Aris
- 1991–1993: PAOK
- 1993–1994: Papagou

Career highlights
- As a player: 9× Greek League champion (1983, 1985–1992); 5× Greek Cup winner (1985, 1987–1990)
Medals
Men's basketball
Representing Greece
EuroBasket
Gold medal – first place	1987 Greece
Silver medal – second place	1989 Yugoslavia

Nikolaos "Nikos" Filippou (alternate spelling: Philippou) (Greek: Νικόλαος "Νίκος" Φιλίππου; born July 15, 1962, Ioannina, Greece) is a retired Greek professional basketball player. At a height of 2.02 m (6 ft 7 1/2 in.), he played at the power forward position.

== Professional career ==
As a member of the Greek club Aris, Filippou won 8 Greek League championships (1983, 1985, 1986, 1987, 1988, 1989, 1990, 1991) and 5 Greek Cups (1985, 1987, 1988, 1989, 1990). He also played at 3 EuroLeague Final Fours (1988, 1989, 1990) with Aris.

In 1991, he moved to PAOK, and with them he again won the Greek League championship, in 1992. He also played at the EuroLeague Final Four with PAOK in 1993. He also played for the Greek club Papagou.

== National team career ==
Filippou was also a member of the senior men's Greek national teams that won the gold medal at the 1987 EuroBasket, and the silver medal at 1989 EuroBasket. He also played with Greece at the 1986 FIBA World Championship.

== Post-playing career ==
As the team manager of the senior men's Greek national team, Filippou won the gold medal at the 2005 EuroBasket, and the silver medal at the 2006 FIBA World Championship. In August 2010, he was appointed the coordinating director of the Peace and Friendship Stadium.

== Awards and accomplishments ==
=== Pro clubs ===
- 9× Greek League Champion: (1983, 1985, 1986, 1987, 1988, 1989, 1990, 1991, 1992)
- 5× Greek Cup Winner: (1985, 1987, 1988, 1989, 1990)

=== Greek senior national team ===
- 1987 EuroBasket: Gold
- 1989 EuroBasket: Silver
