= Argiris Kambouris =

Greek basketball player and coach (born 1962)

Personal information
- Born: January 24, 1962 (age 64) Astypalaia, Greece
- Listed height: 6 ft 9.5 in (2.07 m)
- Listed weight: 225 lb (102 kg)

Career information
- Playing career: 1978–1996
- Position: Power forward / center
- Number: 7

Career history
- 1978–1980: Olympiacos
- 1980–1981: Glyfada
- 1981–1995: Olympiacos
- 1995–1996: Peristeri

Career highlights
- 3× Greek League champion (1993–1995); Greek Cup winner (1994)
Medals
Men's basketball
Representing Greece
FIBA EuroBasket
Gold medal – first place	1987 Greece
Silver medal – second place	1989 Yugoslavia
Mediterranean Games
Bronze medal – third place	1987 Syria	Under-26

Anargiros "Argiris" Kambouris (alternate spellings: Argyris, Kampouris, Kabouris, Greek: Αργύρης Καμπούρης; born January 24, 1962) is a Greek former professional basketball player and coach. During his playing career, at a height of 2.07 m (6 ft 9 1/2 in) tall, he played at both the power forward and center positions. He is considered to be one of the most important players in the history of the Greek basketball club Olympiacos Piraeus. As a member of the senior Greece national team, Kambouris was the hero of the final of the 1987 EuroBasket, as he scored the game's winning points, with two made free throws, that came just four seconds before the game's end.

== Professional career ==
Kambouris played with Olympiacos Piraeus from 1978 to 1995, except for the 1980–81 season, during which he spent on loan with the Greek club A.N.O. Glyfada. As the Team Captain of Olympiacos, he won three Greek League championships, in the years 1993, 1994, and 1995. With Olympiacos, he was also a Greek Cup finalist in 1983 and 1986, and a Greek Cup winner in 1994. He was also a member of two Olympiacos teams that played in the EuroLeague Finals, in 1994 at Tel Aviv, and in 1995 at Zaragoza. He finished his playing career with the Greek club Peristeri Athens.

== National team career ==
Kambouris was an important member of the senior Greece national team. With Greece, he won the gold medal at the 1987 EuroBasket. Kambouris was the 1987 EuroBasket Final's hero. He scored the game's winning two points, with two made free throws, four seconds before the end of the game's overtime period, which gave Greece a dramatic 103–101 victory over the Soviet Union. He also won the silver medal at the 1989 EuroBasket.

Kambouris was also a member of the Greek national teams that finished in 10th place at the 1986 FIBA World Championship, in 6th place at the 1990 FIBA World Championship, and in 5th place at the 1991 EuroBasket. With Greece's senior national team, he had a total of 126 caps (games played).

== Coaching career ==
Kambouris retired from playing professional basketball in 1996. After that, he began a career working as a basketball coach. He later worked as a technical consultant in the infrastructure departments of Olympiacos.

== Personal life ==
Kambouris' son, Nikos Kambouris, is a former professional basketball player, and he is currently a basketball coach.
