= FIBA World Olympic Qualifying Tournament =

Last qualifying tournament for the Olympic Basketball Tournament

The FIBA World Olympic Qualifying Tournament, abbreviated as FIBA World OQT, and formerly known as the FIBA Pre-Olympic Basketball Tournament, is the last qualifying tournament for the Olympic Basketball Tournament. The best non-champions from the different FIBA World zones qualify for the tournament and compete for the last remaining berths in the Summer Olympic Games.

== Men's results ==
Year	Hosts		Final			Third-place game		
Year	Hosts		Winners	Score	Runners-up	Third Place	Score	Fourth Place
1960	(Italy) Bologna	1st Pool	Czechoslovakia	No playoffs	Spain	Belgium*	No playoffs	Canada*
1960	(Italy) Bologna	2nd Pool	Yugoslavia	No playoffs	Hungary	Poland	No playoffs	Israel*
1964	(Japan) Yokohama		Mexico	No playoffs	Australia	Canada	No playoffs	South Korea
1968	(Mexico) Monterrey		Poland	83–82	Spain	Uruguay*	93–65	Indonesia*
1972	(West Germany) Augsburg		Poland	82–78	Spain	Bulgaria*	No playoffs	Mexico*
1976	(Canada) Hamilton		Yugoslavia	No playoffs	Czechoslovakia	Mexico	No playoffs	Brazil*
1988	Netherlands		Soviet Union	No playoffs	Yugoslavia	Spain	No playoffs	Italy*
1992	Spain		Lithuania	No playoffs	Croatia	CIS	No playoffs	Germany
Year	Hosts		Winners			Third place	Score	Fourth place
2008	(Greece) Athens		Greece; Croatia			Germany	96–82	Puerto Rico*
2012	(Venezuela) Caracas		Lithuania; Russia			Nigeria	88–73	Dominican Republic*
Year	Hosts		Winners	Score	Runners-up	Semifinalists		
2016	(Serbia) Belgrade		Serbia	108–77	Puerto Rico*	Latvia*; Czech Republic*		
2016	(Philippines) Pasay		France	83–74	Canada*	New Zealand*; Turkey*		
2016	(Italy) Turin		Croatia	84–78	Italy*	Greece*; Mexico*		
2020	(Croatia) Split		Germany	75–64	Brazil*	Croatia*; Mexico*		
2020	(Lithuania) Kaunas		Slovenia	96–85	Lithuania*	Venezuela*; Poland*		
2020	(Serbia) Belgrade		Italy	102–95	Serbia*	Dominican Republic*; Puerto Rico*		
2020	(Canada) Victoria		Czech Republic	97–72	Greece*	Canada*; Turkey*		
2024	(Spain) Valencia		Spain	86–78	Bahamas*	Finland*; Lebanon*		
2024	(Latvia) Riga		Brazil	94–69	Latvia*	Philippines*; Cameroon*		
2024	(Greece) Piraeus		Greece	80–69	Croatia*	Slovenia*; Dominican Republic*		
2024	(Puerto Rico) San Juan		Puerto Rico	79–68	Lithuania*	Italy*; Mexico*		

(*) Did not qualify for the Summer Olympics.

== Women's results ==
Year	Hosts	Winners	Runners-up	Third Place
1976	(Canada) Hamilton	United States	Bulgaria	Poland
1980	(Bulgaria) Varna	United States	Bulgaria	Cuba
1984	(Cuba) Santiago	China	Yugoslavia	Canada
1988	Malaysia	Soviet Union	Yugoslavia	China
Year	Hosts	Pool Winners	Semifinals Winners	Fifth place
1992	(Spain) Vigo	China; CIS	Brazil; Czechoslovakia	Italy
Year	Hosts	Quarterfinal Winners		Fifth place
2008	(Spain) Madrid	Belarus; Czech Republic; Latvia; Spain		Brazil
2012	(Turkey) Ankara	Croatia; Czech Republic; Turkey; France		Canada
2016	(France) Nantes	China; France; Spain; Turkey		Belarus
Year	Hosts	Winners	Runners-up	Third Place
2020	(Belgium) Ostend	Canada	Belgium	Japan
2020	(France) Bourges	France	Australia	Puerto Rico
2020	(Serbia) Belgrade	United States	Serbia	Nigeria
2020	(Serbia) Belgrade	China	Spain	South Korea
2024	(China) Xi'an	France	China	Puerto Rico
2024	(Belgium) Antwerp	United States	Belgium	Nigeria
2024	(Brazil) Belém	Australia	Germany	Serbia
2024	(Hungary) Sopron	Japan	Spain	Canada
