= Liveris Andritsos =

Greek basketball player and coach (born 1959)

Personal information
- Born: December 31, 1959 (age 66) Athens, Greece
- Listed height: 6 ft 7.5 in (2.02 m)
- Listed weight: 220 lb (100 kg)

Career information
- Playing career: 1978–1992
- Position: Small forward / power forward

Career history
- 1978–1982: Esperos Kallitheas
- 1982–1992: Panathinaikos

Career highlights
- As a player: Greek League champion (1984); 2× Greek Cup winner (1983, 1986); Greek League All-Star (1991)
Medals
Men's basketball
Representing Greece
FIBA EuroBasket
Gold medal – first place	1987 Greece
Silver medal – second place	1989 Yugoslavia
Mediterranean Games
Gold medal – first place	1979 Yugoslavia
European Championship for Cadets
Silver medal – second place	1975 Greece	Under-16

Liveris Andritsos (Greek: Λιβέρης Ανδρίτσος; born December 31, 1959, in Athens, Greece) is a retired Greek professional basketball player and coach. At a height of 2.02 m (6'7 1/2") tall, he could play at both the small forward and power forward positions.

== Professional career ==
Andritsos started his career with Esperos Kallitheas. In 1982, he moved to Panathinaikos, and with them he won the Greek League championship in 1984, and the Greek Cup title in 1983 and 1986. At the end of his career, Andritsos was the top scorer in Panathinaikos' history, since the A1 Division of the Greek League was formed (since the 1986–87 season), as he had scored 2,088 points. In the current time, he is 8th on the club's career scoring list.

== National team career ==
Andritsos was a member of the senior men's Greek national basketball team. With Greece, he played at the 1981 EuroBasket, the 1983 EuroBasket, and the 1986 FIBA World Championship. He was also a member of the Greek national team that won the gold medal at the 1987 EuroBasket, and the silver medal at the 1989 EuroBasket. He was also a member of the Greek team that finished in 6th place at the 1990 FIBA World Championship. In total, he played in 182 games with the senior Greek national team.

== Post-playing career ==
After his playing career ended, Andritsos worked as a basketball coach and a basketball executive. He worked as the coach of Esperos Kallitheas, and the general manager of Panionios. In 2013, he took the job of general manager of the senior men's Greek national team.
