= 1992 pre-Olympic basketball tournament =

6th pre-Olympic basketball tournament

Tournament details
- Host country: Spain
- Dates: 22 June–5 July
- Teams: 25
- Venue(s): 5 (in 5 host cities)

The 1992 European Olympic Basketball Tournament was FIBA Olympic Qualifying Tournament for basketball at the 1992 Summer Olympics in Barcelona, Spain. It was held in five other Spanish cities, Bilbao, Granada, Murcia, Badajoz and Zaragoza, from 22 June to 5 July. 25 FIBA Europe teams were divided into four groups. The best four from final round qualified directly for the Olympic Games.

== Group A ==
Team	W	L	PF	PA	PD	Pts
Czechoslovakia	4	1	379	351	+28	9
Slovenia	4	1	435	346	+89	9
Turkey	3	2	389	365	+24	8
Sweden	2	3	366	365	+1	7
Bulgaria	2	3	334	347	–13	7
Ireland	0	5	303	364	–161	5

All games played at the Pabellón Municipal de Deportes La Casilla, Bilbao.

22 June 1992

Sweden	68–79	Czechoslovakia
Scoring by half: 36–42, 32–37

22 June 1992

Turkey	103–72	Ireland
Scoring by half: 44–30, 59–42

22 June 1992

Slovenia	83–54	Bulgaria
Scoring by half: 34–29, 49–25

23 June 1992

Czechoslovakia	92–55	Ireland
Scoring by half: 43–22, 49–33

23 June 1992

Slovenia	85–74	Sweden
Scoring by half: 47–34, 38–40

23 June 1992

Bulgaria	68–54	Turkey
Scoring by half: 29–24, 39–30

24 June 1992

Ireland	53–101	Slovenia
Scoring by half: 25–38, 28–63

24 June 1992

Sweden	77–73	Bulgaria
Scoring by half: 40–36, 37–37

24 June 1992

Turkey	81–56	Czechoslovakia
Scoring by half: 38–37, 43–19

25 June 1992

Ireland	56–92	Sweden
Scoring by half: 16–36, 40–56

25 June 1992

Slovenia	82–79	Turkey
Scoring by half: 54–35, 28–44

25 June 1992

Czechoslovakia	66–63	Bulgaria
Scoring by half: 35–33, 31–30

26 June 1992

Sweden	55–72	Turkey
Scoring by half: 23–37, 32–35

26 June 1992

Czechoslovakia	86–84	Slovenia
Scoring by half: 48–35, 38–49

26 June 1992

Bulgaria	76–67	Ireland
Scoring by half: 38–41, 38–26

== Group B ==
Team	W	L	PF	PA	PD	Pts
Italy	5	1	561	443	+118	11
Israel	5	1	538	407	+131	11
France	5	1	546	463	+83	11
Latvia	3	3	513	515	–2	9
Poland	2	4	458	479	–21	8
Albania	1	5	428	582	–154	7
Switzerland	0	6	415	570	–155	6

All games played at the Palacio de Deportes de Granada, Granada.

22 June 1992

Latvia	83–80	Poland
Scoring by half: 44–36, 39–44

22 June 1992

Switzerland	61–90	Italy
Scoring by half: 33–52, 28–38

22 June 1992

Israel	91–69	France
Scoring by half: 35–35, 56–34

23 June 1992

Poland	79–66	Switzerland
Scoring by half: 36–26, 43–40

23 June 1992

France	108–67	Albania
Scoring by half: 54–36, 54–31

23 June 1992

Italy	83–63	Israel
Scoring by half: 46–31, 37–32

== Group C ==
Team	W	L	PF	PA	PD	Pts
Germany	5	0	437	346	+91	10
Croatia	4	1	498	336	+162	9
Greece	3	2	407	390	+17	8
Romania	2	3	402	413	–11	7
Portugal	1	4	307	449	–142	6
Iceland	0	5	354	471	–117	5

All games played at the Pabellón Príncipe de Asturias, Murcia.

22 June 1992

Germany	86–74	Croatia

22 June 1992

Romania	75–57	Portugal

22 June 1992

Greece	77–73	Iceland

23 June 1992

Iceland	67–88	Germany

23 June 1992

Greece	100–58	Portugal

23 June 1992

Croatia	89–79	Romania

24 June 1992

Portugal	52–87	Germany

24 June 1992

Croatia	124–51	Iceland

24 June 1992

Romania	72–91	Greece

25 June 1992

Portugal	57–109	Croatia

25 June 1992

Iceland	85–99	Romania

25 June 1992

Germany	85–76	Greece

26 June 1992

Iceland	78–82	Portugal

26 June 1992

Greece	63–102	Croatia

26 June 1992

Romania	77–91	Germany

== Group D ==
Team	W	L	PF	PA	PD	Pts
Lithuania	5	0	509	366	+143	10
CIS	3	2	496	420	+76	8
Estonia	2	3	406	435	–34	7
Netherlands	2	3	407	445	–38	7
Great Britain	2	3	365	414	–49	7
Hungary	1	4	364	467	–103	6

All games played at the Pabellón de La Granadilla, Badajoz.

22 June 1992

CIS	120–57	Hungary
Scoring by half: 58–29, 62–28

22 June 1992

Netherlands	75–100	Lithuania
Scoring by half: 33–48, 42–52

22 June 1992

Great Britain	85–68	Estonia
Scoring by half: 36–39, 49–29

23 June 1992

CIS	92–71	Estonia

23 June 1992

Lithuania	87–71	Great Britain
Scoring by half: 33–52, 28–38

23 June 1992

Hungary	83–74	Netherlands

24 June 1992

Lithuania	106–71	Hungary
Scoring by half: 62–28, 44–43

24 June 1992

Estonia	106–74	Netherlands

24 June 1992

Great Britain	73–109	CIS

25 June 1992

Estonia	70–100	Lithuania

25 June 1992

Hungary	69–76	Great Britain

25 June 1992

Netherlands	103–96 (OT)	CIS
Scoring by half: 44–53, 44–35 Overtime: 15–8

26 June 1992

Great Britain	60–81	Netherlands

26 June 1992

Hungary	84–91	Estonia

26 June 1992

CIS	79–116	Lithuania

== Final round ==
Team	W	L	PF	PA	PD	Pts
Lithuania	7	0	680	570	+110	14
Croatia	5	2	614	536	+78	12
CIS	5	2	599	571	+20	12
Germany	4	3	598	581	+17	11
Slovenia	3	4	561	570	–9	10
Italy	2	5	554	628	–72	8
Czechoslovakia	2	5	524	584	–60	8
Israel	0	7	517	607	–90	7

All games played at the Pabellón Príncipe Felipe, Zaragoza.

29 June 1992

CIS	88–60	Czechoslovakia
Scoring by half: 50–33, 38–27

29 June 1992

Israel	71–85	Germany
Scoring by half: 43–40, 28–45

29 June 1992

Slovenia	91–78	Italy
Scoring by half: 37–25, 54–53

29 June 1992

Croatia	89–99	Lithuania
Scoring by half: 42–44, 47–55

30 June 1992

Italy	78–74	Czechoslovakia
Scoring by half: 42–31, 36–43

30 June 1992

Germany	76–88	Slovenia
Scoring by half: 38–45, 38–33

30 June 1992

Lithuania	95–85	Israel
Scoring by half: 51–49, 44–36

30 June 1992

CIS	81–85	Croatia
Scoring by half: 33–44, 47–41

1 July 1992

Italy	75–83	CIS
Scoring by half: 45–44, 30–39

1 July 1992

Germany	84–100	Lithuania
Scoring by half: 49–40, 35–60

1 July 1992

Czechoslovakia	89–80	Israel
Scoring by half: 38–38, 51–42

1 July 1992

Slovenia	70–93	Croatia
Scoring by half: 39–48, 31–45

3 July 1992

Italy	91–109	Germany
Scoring by half: 48–57, 33–52

3 July 1992

Slovenia	73–90	Lithuania
Scoring by half: 29–44, 44–46

3 July 1992

CIS	101–85	Israel
Scoring by half: 44–35, 57–40

3 July 1992

Czechoslovakia	68–84	Croatia
Scoring by half: 36–38, 32–46

4 July 1992

Israel	63–73	Slovenia
Scoring by half: 29–38, 34–35

4 July 1992

Czechoslovakia	73–80	Lithuania
Scoring by half: 31–36, 42–44

4 July 1992

CIS	83–68	Germany
Scoring by half: 36–33, 47–35

4 July 1992

Italy	62–108	Croatia
Scoring by half: 28–43, 34–65

5 July 1992

Czechoslovakia	74–90	Germany
Scoring by half: 34–47, 30–43

5 July 1992

Italy	87–100	Lithuania
Scoring by half: 47–55, 40–45

5 July 1992

CIS	84–82	Slovenia
Scoring by half: 39–45, 45–37

5 July 1992

Israel	70–81	Croatia
Scoring by half: 31–46, 39–35
