= Eurocup Basketball 2010–11 Regular Season Group E =

Standings and results for Group E of the regular season phase of the 2010–11 Eurocup basketball tournament.

== Standings ==
Key to colors
| Top two places in each group advance to Last 16 |

| | Team | Pld | W | L | PF | PA | Diff |
|---|---|---|---|---|---|---|---|
| 1. | (Turkey) Galatasaray Café Crown | 6 | 4 | 2 | 441 | 374 | +67 |
| 2. | (Greece) Panellinios BC | 6 | 4 | 2 | 366 | 375 | −9 |
| 3. | (Italy) NGC Bennet Cantù | 6 | 3 | 3 | 413 | 398 | +15 |
| 4. | (Netherlands) GasTerra Flames | 6 | 1 | 5 | 365 | 438 | −73 |

Source: Euroleague Basketball

== Fixtures and results ==
All times given below are in Central European Time.

=== Game 1 ===
16 November 2010
19:30

Report

| GasTerra Flames (Netherlands) | 65–66 | (Turkey) Galatasaray Café Crown |
Scoring by quarter: 22–11, 21–23, 9–10, 13–22
| Pts: Ross 15; Rebs: Ellis 11; Asts: Bauscher 8 | | Pts: Rančík 16; Rebs: Rančík 7 Asts: Açık 5 |

Martiniplaza
Attendance: 2,650
Referees: David Chambon (FRA), Robert Vyklicky (CZE), Moritz Reiter (GER)

16 November 2010
20:30

Report

| NGC Bennet Cantù (Italy) | 72–57 | (Greece) Panellinios BC |
Scoring by quarter: 18–14, 16–19, 18–15, 20–9
| Pts: Tabu 17; Rebs: Ortner, Urbutis 6 Asts: Markoishvili 5 | | Pts: Udrih 15; Rebs: Byars 8 Asts: Udrih 3 |

Palasport Pianella
Attendance: 1,600
Referees: Jakub Zamojski (POL), Oscar Perea (ESP), Regis Bardera (FRA)

=== Game 2 ===
23 November 2010
19:00

Report

| Galatasaray Café Crown (Turkey) | 76–57 | (Italy) NGC Bennet Cantù |
Scoring by quarter: 18–16, 22–10, 16–16, 20–15
| Pts: Andrić 19; Rebs: Rančík 7 Asts: Shumpert 5 | | Pts: Micov 14; Rebs: Leunen 6 Asts: Micov, Green 3 |

Abdi İpekçi Arena
Attendance: 2,347
Referees: Dani Hierrezuelo (ESP), Panagiotis Anastopoulos (GRE), Nikola Lepetic (MNE)

23 November 2010
20:00

Report

| Panellinios BC (Greece) | 68–51 | (Netherlands) GasTerra Flames |
Scoring by quarter: 16–12, 10–14, 23–9, 19–15
| Pts: Bailey 15; Rebs: five players 5 Asts: Bailey 4 | | Pts: Haryasz 12; Rebs: Turek 12; Asts: Roijé 5 |

Halkiopouleio Indoor Hall
Attendance: 600
Referees: Zoran Sutulovic (MNE), Rustu Nuran (TUR), Francisco Araña (ESP)

=== Game 3 ===
30 November 2010
19:00

Report

| Galatasaray Café Crown (Turkey) | 79–53 | (Greece) Panellinios BC |
Scoring by quarter: 16–15, 19–7, 15–11, 29–20
| Pts: Shipp 19; Rebs: Shipp 5 Asts: Shumpert 5 | | Pts: Ostojić 15; Rebs: Krabbenhoft 7 Asts: Xanthopoulos 4 |

Abdi İpekçi Arena
Attendance: 3,140
Referees: Fabio Facchini (ITA), Omer Esteron (TUR), Oskars Lucis (LAT)

30 November 2010
19:30

Report

| GasTerra Flames (Netherlands) | 80–74 | (Italy) NGC Bennet Cantù |
Scoring by quarter: 28–20, 12–22, 22–11, 18–21
| Pts: Bostain 22; Rebs: Ellis 8 Asts: Bauscher 5 | | Pts: Leunen 18; Rebs: Micov 9 Asts: Mazzarino, Green 5 |

Martiniplaza
Attendance: 3,060
Referees: Juan Carlos Garcia Gonzalez (ESP), Andrej Lovsyn (SLO), Anna Cardus (ESP)

=== Game 4 ===
7 December 2010
20:00

Report

| Panellinios BC (Greece) | 66–62 | (Turkey) Galatasaray Café Crown |
Scoring by quarter: 11–9, 15–19, 22–16, 18–18
| Pts: Papamakarios, Krabbenhoft 15; Rebs: three players 6 Asts: Papamakarios 4 | | Pts: Shipp, Shumpert 18; Rebs: Kuqo 7 Asts: Açık 3 |

Halkiopouleio Indoor Hall
Attendance: 600
Referees: Grzegorz Ziemblicki (POL), Marius Ciulin (ROU), Tomas Trawicki (POL)

7 December 2010
20:30

Report

| NGC Bennet Cantù (Italy) | 81–54 | (Netherlands) GasTerra Flames |
Scoring by quarter: 27–9, 11–15, 20–14, 23–16
| Pts: Markoishvili 16; Rebs: four players 5 Asts: Leunen, Mazzarino 4 | | Pts: Dourisseau 11; Rebs: Turek 6 Asts: Bauscher 3 |

Palasport Pianella
Attendance: 1,716
Referees: Carl Jungebrand (FIN), Ioannis Foufis (GRE), Igor Dragojevic (MNE)

=== Game 5 ===
14 December 2010
19:00

Report

| Galatasaray Café Crown (Turkey) | 86–58 | (Netherlands) GasTerra Flames |
Scoring by quarter: 23–13, 16–16, 22–8, 25–21
| Pts: Shumpert 18; Rebs: Shipp, Rančík 5 Asts: Rochestie, Açık 5 | | Pts: Haryasz 13; Rebs: Ellis 7 Asts: Haryasz, Bauscher 4 |

Abdi İpekçi Arena
Attendance: 2,020
Referees: Fernando Rocha (POR), Borys Rythyk (UKR), Sergio Silva (POR)

14 December 2010
20:00

Report

| Panellinios BC (Greece) | 59–54 | (Italy) NGC Bennet Cantù |
Scoring by quarter: 14–12, 16–13, 14–12, 15–17
| Pts: Bailey 14; Rebs: Sklavos 10; Asts: Papamakarios, Ostojić 3 | | Pts: Leunen 15; Rebs: three players 5 Asts: Mian, Green 3 |

Halkiopouleio Indoor Hall
Attendance: 800
Referees: Radomir Vojinovic (MNE), Antonio Conde (ESP), Aleksandar Milojevik (MKD)

=== Game 6 ===
21 December 2010
19:45

Report

| NGC Bennet Cantù (Italy) | 75–72 | (Turkey) Galatasaray Café Crown |
Scoring by quarter: 25–13, 14–21, 18–21, 18–17
| Pts: Leunen 17; Rebs: Marconato 10; Asts: Micov 6 | | Pts: Rochestie 14; Rebs: Yıldırım 7 Asts: Rochestie 4 |

Palasport Pianella
Attendance: 1,533
Referees: Sasa Pukl (SLO), Oscar Perea (ESP), Alfred Jovovic (CRO)

21 December 2010
19:45

Report

| GasTerra Flames (Netherlands) | 57–63 | (Greece) Panellinios BC |
Scoring by quarter: 21–15, 10–21, 11–8, 15–19
| Pts: Bauscher 18; Rebs: Ellis 10; Asts: Bauscher 6 | | Pts: Bailey, Udrih 14; Rebs: Krabbenhoft 14; Asts: three players 2 |

Martiniplaza
Attendance: 2,450
Referees: Oscar Lefwerth (SWE), Boris Shulga (UKR), Francisco Araña (ESP)
