= 2005–06 Greek Basket League =

2005–06 Greek Basket League season
- League: Greek Basket League
- Sport: Basketball
- Teams: 14
- TV partner(s): SKAI TV, ERT, Nova Sports

Regular Season
- Season champions: Panathinaikos
- Season MVP: (Greece) Dimitris Diamantidis
- Top scorer: (Croatia) Damir Mulaomerović 487 Points (21.2 PPG)

Playoffs

Finals
- Champions: Panathinaikos
- Runners-up: Olympiacos
- Finals MVP: (Greece) Dimitris Diamantidis & (Greece) Vassilis Spanoulis

Greek Basket League seasons
- ← 2004–05 2006–07 →

The 2005–06 Greek Basket League season was the 66th season of the Greek Basket League, the highest tier professional basketball league in Greece. The winner of the league was Panathinaikos, which beat Olympiacos in the league's playoff's finals. The teams Iraklis and Kolossos Rodou were relegated to the Greek A2 League.

== Teams ==
Location of teams in Greek Basket League 2005–06

Club	Home city
AEK Athens	Athens
Apollon Patras	Patras
Aris	Thessaloniki
Gymnastikos	Larissa
Iraklis	Thessaloniki
Kolossos Rodou	Rhodes
Makedonikos	Kozani (temporarily)
Maroussi	Maroussi, Athens
Olympia Larissa	Larissa
Olympiacos	Piraeus
Panathinaikos	Athens
Panellinios	Athens
Panionios	Nea Smyrni, Athens
PAOK	Thessaloniki

== Regular season ==
=== Standings ===
Pos	Team	Total							Home				Away			
		Pts	Pld	W	L	F	A	GD	W	L	F	A	W	L	F	A
1.	Panathinaikos	50	26	24	2	2276	1914	362	13	0	1199	937	11	2	1077	977
2.	Olympiacos	48	26	22	4	2149	1870	279	13	0	1090	903	9	4	1059	967
3.	Maroussi	43	26	17	9	1885	1789	96	11	2	974	862	6	7	911	927
4.	Aris	41	26	15	11	1932	1830	102	10	3	969	871	5	8	963	959
5.	Panellinios	40	26	14	12	1949	1927	22	8	5	1003	979	6	7	946	948
6.	PAOK	39	26	13	13	2006	2091	-85	9	4	1053	1033	4	9	953	1058
7.	AEK Athens	39	26	13	13	2007	1959	48	9	4	1020	928	4	9	987	1031
8.	Panionios	38	26	12	14	1978	2049	-71	10	3	1042	992	2	11	936	1057
9.	Olympia Larissa	36	26	10	16	1932	1959	-27	7	6	956	944	3	10	976	1015
10.	Apollon Patras	36	26	10	16	2024	2068	-44	6	7	1040	986	4	9	984	1082
11.	Gymnastikos	35	26	9	17	2012	2160	-148	8	5	1041	1031	1	12	971	1129
12.	Makedonikos	35	26	9	17	1977	2123	-146	7	6	1010	1013	2	11	967	1110
13.	Iraklis	34	26	8	18	1840	1988	-148	7	6	977	952	1	12	863	1036
14.	Kolossos Rodou	32	26	6	20	1838	2078	-240	5	8	968	1032	1	12	870	1046

Pts=Points, P=Matches played, W=Matches won, L=Matches lost, F=Points for, A=Points against, D=Points difference

Playoff
Relegation to HEBA A2

=== Results ===
	AEK	APO	ARI	GYM	IRA	KOL	MAK	MAR	OLL	OLY	PAO	PGS	PAN	PAOK
AEK Athens		80-86	64-58	105-69	75-59	78-63	84-67	80-77	82-79	76-82	84-85	70-65	82-59	60-79
Apollon Patras	74-81		58-79	76-63	85-59	105-72	100-110	61-66	66-73	64-70	86-89	91-82	90-84	84-58
Aris	68-66	84-69		79-68	84-65	66-50	84-66	62-52	70-87	70-64	69-73	64-70	78-62	91-79
Gymnastikos	90-86	79-94	84-91		83-85	65-63	73-66	78-70	84-80	83-74	72-84	82-78	85-75	83-85
Iraklis	75-68	59-70	89-80	65-47		78-75	80-71	74-75	80-71	76-82	73-75	67-77	83-94	78-67
Kolossos Rodou	69-77	92-94	75-72	92-95	61-58		91-96	63-79	87-79	72-84	61-80	63-80	66-65	76-73
Makedonikos	73-80	83-73	60-75	117-114	84-60	57-61		86-74	83-76	72-99	68-83	69-80	72-59	86-79
Maroussi	74-69	79-72	51-66	86-64	78-63	75-61	85-72		64-63	82-69	74-77	52-51	85-65	89-70
Olympia Larissa	79-72	80-55	88-83	88-83	78-74	67-60	71-56	62-67		72-99	61-79	67-68	70-74	73-74
Olympiacos	97-84	85-63	79-66	87-69	84-60	82-69	83-66	71-67	78-61		84-77	88-86	78-64	94-71
Panathinaikos	81-64	110-88	80-78	88-74	76-57	112-66	114-77	78-73	89-84	90-71		92-65	98-77	91-63
Panellinios	82-74	80-62	72-60	77-68	72-60	92-86	98-82	65-72	71-78	65-90	68-85		92-82	69-80
Panionios	89-75	83-79	83-76	79-69	85-75	74-72	76-74	79-65	84-80	78-85	79-94	69-73		84-75
PAOK	80-91	88-79	76-79	90-88	91-88	95-72	71-64	68-74	77-65	67-90	98-96	74-71	78-76	

== Playoffs ==
=== Bracket ===
Quarterfinals
1	Panathinaikos	2
8	Panionios	0
4	Aris	2
5	Panellinios	0
2	Olympiacos	2
7	AEK Athens	0
3	Maroussi	2
6	PAOK	1

Semifinals
1	Panathinaikos	3
4	Aris	0
2	Olympiacos	3
3	Maroussi	2

Finals
1	Panathinaikos	3
2	Olympiacos	0

=== Quarterfinals ===
==== (1) Panathinaikos vs. (8) Panionios ====
Panathinaikos win the series 2-0

	Home team	Score	Away team	Venue	Date
Game 1	Panathinaikos	86 – 69	Panionios	Olympic Sports Hall, Athens	May 8, 2006
Game 2	Panionios	86 – 104	Panathinaikos	Helliniko Olympic Arena, Athens	May 10, 2006

==== (2) Olympiacos vs. (7) AEK Athens ====
Olympiacos win the series 2-0

	Home team	Score	Away team	Venue	Date
Game 1	Olympiacos	93 – 67	AEK Athens	Peace and Friendship Stadium, Athens	May 8, 2006
Game 2	AEK Athens	83 – 104	Olympiacos	Galatsi Olympic Hall, Athens	May 10, 2006

==== (3) Maroussi vs. (6) PAOK ====
Maroussi win the series 2-1

	Home team	Score	Away team	Venue	Date
Game 1	Maroussi	61 – 59	PAOK	Maroussi Indoor Hall, Athens	May 8, 2006
Game 2	PAOK	69 – 66	Maroussi	PAOK Sports Arena, Thessaloniki	May 10, 2006
Game 3	Maroussi	83 – 74	PAOK	Maroussi Indoor Hall, Athens	May 13, 2006

==== (4) Aris vs. (5) Panellinios ====
Aris win the series 2-0

	Home team	Score	Away team	Venue	Date
Game 1	Aris	70 – 63	Panellinios	Alexandreio Melathron, Thessaloniki	May 8, 2006
Game 2	Panellinios	74 – 78	Aris	Panellinios Indoor Hall, Athens	May 10, 2006

=== Semifinals ===
==== (1) Panathinaikos vs. (4) Aris ====
Panathinaikos win the series 3-0

	Home team	Score	Away team	Venue	Date
Game 1	Panathinaikos	83 – 67	Aris	Olympic Sports Hall, Athens	May 15, 2006
Game 2	Aris	71 – 93	Panathinaikos	Alexandreio Melathron, Thessaloniki	May 18, 2006
Game 3	Panathinaikos	79 – 72	Aris	Olympic Sports Hall, Athens	May 21, 2006

==== (2) Olympiacos vs. (3) Maroussi ====
Olympiacos win the series 3-2

	Home team	Score	Away team	Venue	Date
Game 1	Olympiacos	75 – 60	Maroussi	Peace and Friendship Stadium, Athens	May 16, 2006
Game 2	Maroussi	70 – 65	Olympiacos	Maroussi Indoor Hall, Athens	May 18, 2006
Game 3	Olympiacos	81 – 62	Maroussi	Peace and Friendship Stadium, Athens	May 21, 2006
Game 4	Maroussi	70 – 66	Olympiacos	Maroussi Indoor Hall, Athens	May 24, 2006
Game 5	Olympiacos	82 – 65	Maroussi	Peace and Friendship Stadium, Athens	May 27, 2006

=== 3rd place ===
==== (3) Maroussi vs. (4) Aris ====
Aris win the series 3-2

	Home team	Score	Away team	Venue	Date
Game 1	Maroussi	74 – 59	Aris	Maroussi Indoor Hall, Athens	May 31, 2006
Game 2	Aris	84 – 54	Maroussi	Alexandreio Melathron, Thessaloniki	June 3, 2006
Game 3	Maroussi	71 – 56	Aris	Maroussi Indoor Hall, Athens	June 7, 2006
Game 4	Aris	77 – 66	Maroussi	Alexandreio Melathron, Thessaloniki	June 10, 2006
Game 5	Maroussi	59 – 63	Aris	Maroussi Indoor Hall, Athens	June 14, 2006

=== Finals ===
==== (1) Panathinaikos vs. (2) Olympiacos ====
Panathinaikos win the series 3-0

Game 1

31 May 2006

(Report)

Panathinaikos	82–76	Olympiacos
Scoring by quarter: 23-19, 22-25, 19-12, 18-20

Olympic Indoor Hall, Athens
Attendance: 10,000

Game 2

4 June 2006

(Report)

Olympiacos	68–79	Panathinaikos
Scoring by quarter: 23-25, 12-12, 18-21, 15-21

Peace and Friendship Stadium, Athens
Attendance: 6,000

Game 3

7 June 2006

(Report)

Panathinaikos	82–70	Olympiacos
Scoring by quarter: 23-22, 16-11, 19-16, 24-21

Olympic Indoor Hall, Athens
Attendance: 18,000

== Final league table ==
Pos	Team	Overall record		
		Pld	W	L
1.	Panathinaikos	34	32	2
2.	Olympiacos	36	27	9
3.	Aris	36	20	16
4.	Maroussi	39	23	16
5.	Panellinios	28	14	14
6.	PAOK	29	14	15
7.	AEK Athens	28	13	15
8.	Panionios	28	12	16
9.	Olympia Larissa	26	10	16
10.	Apollon Patras	26	10	16
11.	Gymnastikos	26	9	17
12.	Makedonikos	26	9	17
13.	Iraklis	26	8	18
14.	Kolossos Rodou	26	6	20

2006–07 Euroleague Regular Season
Eurocup 2006–07 Regular Season
Relegation to HEBA A2 2006–07

- PAOK and AEK took the places of Maroussi and Panellinios in the Eurocup 2006–07 Regular Season.

Greek Basket League 2005–06
Champions
Panathinaikos
27th Title

== Awards ==
=== Greek League MVP ===
- (Greece) Dimitris Diamantidis – Panathinaikos

=== Greek League Finals MVP ===
- (Greece) Vassilis Spanoulis &
- (Greece) Dimitris Diamantidis – Panathinaikos

=== All-Greek League Team ===
- (United States) Roderick Blakney – Maroussi
- (Greece) Vassilis Spanoulis – Panathinaikos
- (Greece) Dimitris Diamantidis – Panathinaikos
- (United States) Ryan Stack – Aris
- (Greece) Sofoklis Schortsanitis – Olympiacos

=== Best Coach ===
- (Greece) Panagiotis Giannakis– Maroussi

=== Best Young Player ===
- (Greece) Dimitrios Tsaldaris – Aris

=== Most Improved Player ===
- (Greece) Loukas Mavrokefalidis – PAOK

== Statistical leaders ==
Greek Basket League stats leaders are counted by totals, rather than averages, and include both regular season.

Points

Pos	Player	Club	Total points
1.	(Croatia) Damir Mulaomerović	Panellinios	487
2.	(United States) William Avery	Panionios	454
3.	(Greece) Loukas Mavrokefalidis	PAOK	429
4.	(Greece) Kostas Haralabidis	Makedonikos	401
5.	(United States) Chris Garner	Gymnastikos	400

Rebounds

Pos	Player	Club	Total Rebounds
1.	(United States) Jeremiah Massey	Gymnastikos	222
2.	(Greece) Loukas Mavrokefalidis	PAOK	212
3.	(Greece) Yiannis Bourousis	AEK Athens	210
4.	(United States) Danya Abrams	Apollon Patras	208
5.	(United States) Travon Bryant	Kolossos Rodou	178
5.	(United States) Elton Brown	Makedonikos	178

Assists

Pos	Player	Club	Total Assists
1.	(Croatia) Damir Mulaomerović	Panellinios	115
2.	(Greece) Giannis Gagaloudis	PAOK	109
3.	(Greece) Vassilis Spanoulis	Panathinaikos	91
4.	(Greece) Dimitris Diamantidis	Panathinaikos	90
5.	(Greece) Vasilis Xanthopoulos	PAOK	87

Steals

Pos	Player	Club	Total Steals
1.	(United States) Chris Garner	Gymnastikos	48
2.	(Greece) Dimitris Diamantidis	Panathinaikos	46
3.	(Greece) Giannis Gagaloudis	PAOK	43
4.	(Greece) Vasilis Xanthopoulos	PAOK	42
5.	(Israel) Dror Hagag	AEK Athens	39

Blocks

Pos	Player	Club	Total Blocks
1.	(United States) Ryan Stack	Aris	36
2.	(Serbia) Aleksandar Radojević	Olympia Larissa	33
3.	(United States) Travon Bryant	Kolossos Rodou	27
4.	(Senegal) Mamadou N'Diaye	PAOK	26
5.	(Greece) Yiannis Bourousis	AEK Athens	25

Source: Galanis Sports Data

== Clubs in international competitions ==
Team	Competition	Result
Panathinaikos	EuroLeague	Playoffs, Quarterfinals
Olympiacos	EuroLeague	Playoffs, Quarterfinals
AEK	EuroLeague	Regular season, 8th place
Aris	ULEB Cup	Final, 2nd Place
Panionios	ULEB Cup	Top 16, Home and away format
Maroussi	FIBA EuroCup	Playoffs, Quarterfinals
PAOK	FIBA EuroCup	Regular season, 4th place
Olympia Larissa	FIBA EuroCup Challenge	Semifinals, Home and away format
