= Sotirios Karapostolou =

Greek coach and retired basketball player (born 1978)

Iraklis Thessaloniki
- Title: Assistant coach
- League: Greek Basketball League; FIBA Europe Cup

Personal information
- Born: 15 July 1978 (age 48) Larissa, Greece
- Listed height: 6 ft 5 in (1.96 m)
- Listed weight: 215 lb (98 kg)

Career information
- College: Southern New Hampshire (1999–2003)
- Playing career: 2003–2015
- Position: Shooting guard / small forward
- Coaching career: 2021–present

Career history

Playing
- 2003–2004: Artland Dragons
- 2004–2005: Aris Thessaloniki
- 2005–2006: Makedonikos Neapoli
- 2006–2007: Panellinios
- 2007–2008: Rethymno
- 2008: Keravnos Strovolos
- 2008–2009: Olympia Larissa
- 2009–2010: Iraklis Thessaloniki
- 2010–2012: Kavala
- 2012–2013: Aris Thessaloniki
- 2013–2015: Kavala

Coaching
- 2021–2022: Iraklis Thessaloniki (assistant)
- 2022–2025: Aris Thessaloniki (assistant)
- 2025–present: Iraklis (assistant)

Sotiris Karapostolou (alternate spelling: Sotirios) (Greek: Σωτήρης Καραποστόλου; born 15 July 1978 in Larissa, Greece) is a Greek former professional basketball player and is the current assistant coach for Iraklis Thessaloniki of the Greek Basketball League (GBL) and the FIBA Europe Cup. During his playing days, he was a 1.96 m (6 ft 5 in) tall swingman.

== College career ==
Sotiris Karapostolou played college basketball at Southern New Hampshire University. He was inducted into the school's athletic hall of fame in 2009.

== Professional career ==
In his professional career, Sotiris Karapostolou has played with the following clubs: Artland Dragons, Aris Thessaloniki, Makedonikos Neapoli, Panellinios, Rethymno, Keravnos Strovolos, Olympia Larissa, Iraklis Thessaloniki, and Kavala. He returned to Kavala in 2013, after having previously played with the club.

== Coaching career ==
In the summer of 2021, Sotiris Karapostolou became an assistant coach for Iraklis Thessaloniki, under coach Thanasis Skourtopoulos. In 2022, he moved to Aris Thessaloniki, under coach Giannis Kastritis, where he stayed for almost three years.
