= Georgallis =

Georgallis (Greek: Γεωργαλλής) is a Greek surname. Notable people with the surname include:

- Steve Georgallis (born 1968), Australian rugby league footballer and coach
- Ioannis Georgallis (born 1983), Greek basketball player
