= Georgios Kalaitzis =

Greek basketball player & coach (born 1976)

Georgios Kalaitzis Γιώργος Καλαϊτζής
Personal information
- Born: August 29, 1976 (age 50) Thessaloniki, Greece
- Listed height: 6 ft 5 in (1.96 m)
- Listed weight: 220 lb (100 kg)

Career information
- NBA draft: 1998: undrafted
- Playing career: 1994–2014
- Position: Guard / small forward
- Coaching career: 2015–present

Career history

Playing
- 1994–1997: Panionios
- 1997: Olimpia Milano
- 1997–2006: Panathinaikos
- 2006–2008: Aris
- 2008–2011: Panellinios
- 2011–2013: Kolossos Rodou
- 2013–2014: Doukas

Coaching
- 2015–2023: Panathinaikos (Youth academy)
- 2020–2022: Panathinaikos (assistant)

Career highlights
- As player: 2× EuroLeague champion (2000, 2002); 8× Greek Basket League champion (1999–2001, 2003–2006); 3× Greek Cup winner (2003, 2005, 2006)
Medals
Men's basketball
Representing Greece
FIBA Under-19 World Cup
Gold medal – first place	1995 Greece	Under-19

Georgios Kalaitzis (also spelled Giorgos; Greek: Γιώργος Καλαϊτζής; born August 29, 1976) is a Greek basketball coach and former professional player, who last served as the youth academy head coach for Panathinaikos of the Greek Basket League and the EuroLeague. During his playing career, at a height of 1.96 m (6 ft 5 in) tall, Kalaitzis played at the point guard, shooting guard and small forward positions.

== Professional career ==
In his pro club career, Kalaitzis played with: the Greek Basket League club Panionios, the Italian LBA club Olimpia Milano, and the Greek Basket League clubs Panathinaikos, Aris, Panellinios, and Kolossos. He ended his playing career with Doukas, of the Greek 3rd Division.

== National team career ==
With Greece's under-19 national team, Kalaitzis won the gold medal at the 1995 FIBA Under-19 World Cup. As a member of the senior men's Greek national team, he played at the 1997 EuroBasket, the 1998 FIBA World Championship, the 1999 EuroBasket, and the 2001 EuroBasket.

== Coaching career ==
Kalaitzis became the head coach in the youth academy of Panathinaikos in 2015. In January 2020, he joined the senior men's first team of Panathinaikos, working as an assistant coach to Rick Pitino.

== Awards and accomplishments ==
=== Pro career ===
- 2× EuroLeague Champion: (2000, 2002)
- 8× Greek League Champion: (1998, 1999, 2000, 2001, 2003, 2004, 2005, 2006)
- 3× Greek Cup Winner: (2003, 2005, 2006)
- 3× Greek League All-Star: (2001, 2003, 2004)

=== Greek junior national team ===
- 1995 FIBA Under-19 World Cup: Gold
