= Basketball at the 1955 Mediterranean Games =

The basketball tournament at the 1955 Mediterranean Games was held in Barcelona, Spain.

== Medalists ==
| Event | Gold | Silver | Bronze |
|---|---|---|---|
| Men | Spain | Italy | Greece |

=== Standings ===
| Rank | Team |
|---|---|
| 1st place, gold medalist(s) | Spain Jordi Bonareu, Josep Brunet, Joan Canals, Antonio Díaz-Miguel, Joaquín Hernández, Arturo Imedio, Eduardo Kucharski, Andrés Oller, Luis Trujillano, Francisco Capel, Jaume Bassó, Rafael González Adrio, Manuel Pardo Abad, José Luis Martínez Gómez. Coach: Jacinto Ardevínez |
| 2nd place, silver medalist(s) | Italy Stelio Posar, Lino Cappelletti, Silvio Lucev, Tonino Costanzo, Vinicio Nesti, Sandro Gamba, Gianfranco Sardagna, Elvio Bizzarro, Sandro Riminucci, Sergio Macoratti, Cesare Volpato, Giorgio Corsi. Coach: Jim McGregor |
| 3rd place, bronze medalist(s) | Greece Themis Cholevas, Vasilis Eutaxias, Kostas Karamanlis, Panagiotis Manias, Faidon Matthaiou, Kostas Mourouzis, Kostas Papadimas, Aristeidis Roubanis, Alekos Spanoudakis, Giannis Spanoudakis, Mimis Stefanidis. Coach: Nikos Nisiotis |
| 4 | Egypt Hussain Montassir, Armand Catafago, Abdel Rahman Hafez, Youssef Abou Ouf, Mohamed Medhat Bahgat, Abdel Sabry Ahmed, Abdel Motaal Chelbaya Sami, Abdou Iskandar Nabil, Ibrahim El Sayed Fouad, Raymond Sabounghi, Abdou Ahmed Rashad, Fouad Abdel Meguid, Magdi Rizkalleh. |
| 5 | France Roger Veyron, Gérard Sturla, Yves Gominon, Roger Antoine, Bernard Planque, Jean Chapard, Claude Souchal, Ives Cochet, Claude Desseaux, Henri Grange, Maurice Buffiere, Robert Beugnot, Louis Bertorelle. Coach: Robert Busnel |
| 6 | Turkey Yani Tomaidis, Tunç Erim, Turhan Tezol, Güney Ülmen, Ertem Göreç, Ertan Gönen, Şevket Taşlıca, Erdoğan Karabelen, Tuğrul Demir, Hikmet Vardar, Haşim Tankut, Yavuz Türkoğlu. Coach: Samim Göreç |
| 7 | Lebanon Varouj Azadian, Naoum Barakat, Ibrahim Darbous, Wadih Fawaz, Christo Georgio, Elle Homsy, Ahmad Idlibi, Edouard Karam, Maurice Nasr, Khalil Nekkaoui, Garo Setrakian, Hagop Tutundjian. |
| 8 | Syria Farouk Midani, Walid Kayat, Narwan Saka Amini, Nasouh Naal, Fanrzat Nachawi, Ihsan Koudsi, Nizar Nachawi, Narwan Malki, Nader Karkukil, Tarif Omari, Ahmad Younes, Mamoun Rahal. |
