= Panagiotis Manias =

Greek basketball player (1933–2020)

Panos Manias
Personal information
- Born: 1933 Velo, Greece
- Died: 10 July 2020 (aged 87) Piraeus, Athens, Greece
- Listed height: 6 ft 2.75 in (1.90 m)
- Position: Power forward

Career history
- –1957: Panellinios

Career highlights
- 2× European Club Champion (1955, 1956); 3× Greek League champion (1953, 1955, 1957)
Medals
Men's Basketball
Representing Greece
Mediterranean Games
| Bronze medal – third place | 1955 Spain |

Panagiotis "Panos" Manias (Greek: Παναγιώτης "Πάνος" Μανιάς, alternate spelling: Panayiotis, 1933 – 10 July 2020) was an international basketball player, track athlete and bridge player from Greece. During his club playing career, he played at the power forward position.

== Track and field career ==
Manias began his career as an athlete competing in track competitions. He competed in both the high jump and the long jump.

== Basketball career ==
=== Club career ===
Manias was a member of the Panellinios Basketball Club and its famous 1950s era "Chrysi Pentada", or “The Golden Five” in English. With Panellinios, he won 3 Greek League championships, in the years 1953, 1955, and 1957. He also won two European Club Championships with the club, as he won the 1955 Brussels Basketball Tournament and the 1956 San Remo Basketball Tournament. While he was also a runner-up at the 1954 San Remo Tournament.

=== National team career ===
Manias was also a member of the senior men's Greek national basketball team. With Greece, he competed at the following tournaments: the 1951 Mediterranean Games, the 1951 EuroBasket, the 1952 Summer Olympic Games, and the 1955 Mediterranean Games, where he won a bronze medal.

== Bridge career ==
Manias was a member of the Greek bridge national team. He competed at both the 1976 and 1980 editions of the World Team Olympiad.

== Death ==
Manias died in Piraeus, Athens, Greece, on 10 July 2020, at the age of 87, due to drowning.
