= Stevan Nađfeji =

Serbian professional basketball coach (born 1979)

Personal information
- Born: August 16, 1979 (age 47) Belgrade, SR Serbia, SFR Yugoslavia
- Listed height: 2.04 m (6 ft 8 in)
- Listed weight: 111 kg (245 lb)

Career information
- NBA draft: 2001: undrafted
- Playing career: 1996–2017
- Position: Power forward
- Coaching career: 2017–present

Career history

Playing
- 1996–2000: Beobanka
- 2000–2001: Radnički Beograd
- 2001–2002: Partizan
- 2002–2004: Ural Great
- 2004: Verviers-Pepinster
- 2004–2005: UNICS Kazan
- 2005–2007: Panellinios
- 2007: Vizura
- 2007–2008: Rethymno
- 2008–2009: Panellinios
- 2009–2010: Maroussi
- 2010–2011: Igokea
- 2011–2012: Panionios
- 2013–2014: Kolossos Rodou
- 2015–2017: Dynamic Belgrade

Coaching
- 2017: Dynamic Belgrade (assistant)

Career highlights
- YUBA League champion (2002); Yugoslav Cup winner (2002)
Medals
Men's basketball
Representing (Federal Republic of Yugoslavia) FR Yugoslavia
'22 & under' European Championship
Gold medal – first place	1998 Italy	Team
U18 European Championship
Bronze medal – third place	1996 France	Team

Stevan Nađfeji (Serbian Cyrillic: Стеван Нађфеји; born August 16, 1979) is a Serbian professional basketball coach and former player.

== Playing career ==
Standing at 2.04 m (6 ft 8 1/2 in), he played at the power forward position. During his professional career, Nađfeji has played with: Beobanka, Radnički Beograd, Partizan, Ural Great, Verviers-Pepinster, UNICS Kazan, Panellinios (twice), Vizura, Rethymno, Maroussi, Igokea, Panionios, Kolossos Rodou and Dynamic.

In June 2017, Nađfeji announced his retirement from professional basketball.

=== Yugoslavian national team ===
Nađfeji played with the junior national teams of the Federal Republic of Yugoslavia. He won the bronze medal at the 1996 FIBA Europe Under-18 Championship, and the gold medal at the 1998 FIBA Europe Under-20 Championship.

== Coaching career ==
On August 7, 2017, Nađfeji was named an assistant coach for the Dynamic.

== Personal life ==
Nađfeji is the younger brother of Aleksandar Nađfeji, who was also a professional basketball player.
