= Georgios Limniatis =

Greek basketball player and coach

Personal information
- Born: March 22, 1971 (age 55) Euboea, Greece
- Listed height: 6 ft 3.75 in (1.92 m)
- Listed weight: 210 lb (95 kg)

Career information
- Playing career: 1990–2007
- Position: Point guard
- Coaching career: 2010–present

Career history

Playing
- 1990–1992: Panellinios
- 1992–1995: Olympiacos
- 1995–1998: Papagou
- 1998–1999: Panionios
- 1999–2000: Dafni
- 2000–2003: PAOK
- 2003–2004: Panellinios
- 2004–2005: Ionikos NF
- 2005–2006: Doukas
- 2006–2007: Sporting

Coaching
- 2010–2019: Greece (Cadets, Juniors)
- 2014–2016: Nea Kifissia (assistant)
- 2016: Kymis (assistant)
- 2017: PAOK (assistant)
- 2019–2021: AEK (assistant)
- 2017–2023: Georgia (assistant)
- 2023: Lavrio
- 2023–2024: Maroussi
- 2024–2025: Peristeri
- 2025: Promitheas Patras

Career highlights
- As a player: 3× Greek League champion (1993–1995); Greek Cup winner (1994); Greek 2nd Division champion (2004)
Medals
Men's basketball
Representing Greece
FIBA Europe Under-20 Championship
Silver medal – second place	1992 Greece	Under-20

Georgios "George" Limniatis (alternate spellings: Giorgos, Giorgios) (Greek: Γιώργος Λιμνιάτης; born March 22, 1971) is a Greek retired professional basketball player and professional basketball coach, currently managing Promitheas Patras of the Greek Basketball League (GBL). During his athlete days, he played at the point guard position.

== Playing career ==
=== Clubs ===
Limniatis began his career in 1990, with the Greek club Panellinios. In 1992, he moved to the Greek club Olympiacos. With Olympiacos, he won three Greek League championships (1993, 1994, 1995), and the Greek Cup (1994). He then played with the Greek clubs Papagou, Panionios, and Dafnis.

In 2000, he joined PAOK Thessaloniki, where he played for three seasons. He returned to Panellinios for the 2003–04 season. He then played with Ionikos NF, during the 2004–05 season.

He spent the 2005–06 season with Doukas, and the 2006–07 season with Sporting. Following the 2006–07 season, he retired from playing professional basketball.

=== Greek junior national team ===
Limniatis was a member of the Greek junior national teams. He played with Greece's junior national teams at the 1992 FIBA Europe Under-20 Championship, where he won a silver medal, and at the 1993 FIBA Under-21 World Cup.

== Coaching career ==
After he retired from playing professional basketball, Limniatis became a basketball coach. On February 22, 2023, Limniatis received his first professional head coaching position with Lavrio, replacing Christos Serelis for the rest of the season. Despite helping the club avoid relegation and having renewed his contract earlier in the year for the upcoming season, Limniatis unexpectedly parted ways with Lavrio on July 14, 2023.

In the 2024 offseason, Limniatis was picked to replace Vassilis Spanoulis as the head coach of Peristeri. On December 1, 2025, he parted ways with the team.

== Awards and accomplishments ==
=== Playing career ===
- 3× Greek League Champion: (1993, 1994, 1995)
- Greek Cup Winner: (1994)
