= Nikos Nissiotis =

Greek theologian, philosopher, professor, basketball coach

Personal information
- Born: 21 May 1924 Athens, Greece
- Died: 18 August 1986 (aged 62) Athens, Greece

Career history

Coaching
- Panellinios

Career highlights
- As a head coach: Olympic Order (1986); 2× European International Club Tournament Champion (1955, 1956); 3× Greek League champion (1953, 1955, 1957)
Medals
Men's Basketball
Representing Greece (Head coach)
Mediterranean Games
Bronze medal – third place	1955 Spain

Nikolaos "Nikos" A. Nissiotis (alternate spelling: Nisiotis) (Greek: Νικόλαος "Νίκος" A. Νησιώτης; 21 May 1924 – 18 August 1986) was a Greek theologian, philosopher, university professor, and basketball coach.

== Basketball coaching career ==
Nissiotis is largely credited with developing the sport of basketball in Greece. He was the head coach of the Greek League club Panellinios Athens, during its famous "Golden Five", or "Fabulous Five" era, during the 1950s decade. With Panellinios, he won 3 Greek League championships, in the years 1953, 1955, and 1957. He also won two European-wide International Club Tournament Championships with the club, as he won the 1955 Brussels Basketball Tournament and the 1956 San Remo Basketball Tournament. While he was also a runner-up at the 1954 San Remo Tournament. The long-time Yugoslav national team head coach Aca Nikolić saw the team systems of Panellinios during those European International Club Tournaments, and he based what would eventually become known as the "Yugoslav basketball school" and later the "Serbian Basketball School" on them.

Nissiotis also coached the senior men's Greek national team. He led Greece to a bronze medal at the 1955 Mediterranean Games. He received the Olympic Order in 1986. He is a candidate to be inducted into the FIBA Hall of Fame as well.

== Greek International Olympic Committee ==
Nissiotis was the Vice-President of the Greek Olympic Committee, from 1975 until 1986, and the President of the Board of the International Olympic Academy, from 1977 to 1986. He was also a Permanent Representative of Greece to the International Olympic Committee (IOC).

== A significant theological quote ==
‘The Orthodox have no social system, no definite Christian theory of social relations, no theological doctrine of work and profession, or sexual morality, no definite position on birth control, no guiding principle on industrialization, nor theological judgment on modern secularization. The role of the Church is not to propose norms which would be applicable everywhere and which would give rise to a single form of civilization or technical culture.’ Nikos Nissiotis, Orthodox theologian, "L'Église et la société dans la théologie orthodoxe grecque"

== Personal life and death ==
Nissiotis was born on 21 May 1924, in Athens, Greece. On 18 August 1986, Nissiotis was killed in a car crash, at the age of 62. The crash occurred at the 41 kilometre (25 mile) mark of the Athens to Corinth National Road.

== Sources ==
- "Secular and Christian Images of Human Person" // Theologia 33, Athens 1962, PP. 947–989; Theologia 34, Athens 1963, PP. 90–122 (in English)
- “Knowledge as Charisma in the University Today” // Student World, vol. 55, no. 1, 1962. PP. 77–87 (in English)
- "Principles of an Ecumenically Oriented Theology" // Criterion, spring 1963. PP. 3–6 (in English)
- "Orthodox Theological Education: Reality and Perspectives" // Epistimoniki Epetiris his Theologikis Scholis tou Panepistimiou Athinon. vol. 23, 1976 PP. 507–530 (in English)
- "Orthodox Principles in the Service of an Ecumenical Theological Education" // Orthodox Theology and Diakonia: Essays in Honor of Archbishop Iakovos, Brookline MA, 1981 PP. 329–338 (in English)
- Religion, Philosophy and Sport in Dialogue. Athens, 1994 (in English)
- "Les Problemes de l'education olympique envisages a travers les travaux de l'Academie Internationale Olympique" // Athens, International Olympic Academy, 1980 PP. 43–55 (in French)
- L´Eglise et la Société dans la Theologie orthodoxe grecque. in L´Ethique sociale ... Genf 1966 (in French)
- Die qualitative Bedeutung der Katholizität. Theologische Zeitschrift Basel Jgg 17, 4/1961, 259-280 (in German)
- Die Theologie der Ostkirche im ökumenischen Dialog: Kirche und Welt in orthodoxer Sicht. Stuttgart: Evangelisches Verlagswerk, 1968 (in German)
- Maria in der orthodoxen Theologie. In: Concilium 19 (1983), S. 613-625 (in German)
- Μάριος Μπέγζος, «Νησιώτης Νικόλαος», Παγκόσμιο Βιογραφικό Λεξικό-Εκπαιδευτική Ελληνική Εγκυκλοπαίδεια, Εκδοτική Αθηνών, τόμ. 7 (1991), σελ. 199-200 (in Greek)
- Χρήστος Γιανναράς, Ορθοδοξία και Δύση στη νεώτερη Ελλάδα, εκδ. Δόμος, Αθήνα, 1992, σελ. 449-454 (in Greek)
- Μάριος Μπέγζος, «Νικόλαος Νησιώτης (1924-1986)», Επιστημονική Επετηρίς της Θεολογικής Σχολής του Πανεπιστημίου Αθηνών, τόμ. 31 (1996), σελ. 9-30 (in Greek)
- Μιχάλης Μακράκης, Ιστορία της Φιλοσοφίας της θρησκείας, εκδ. Ελληνικά Γράμματα, Αθήνα, 1994, σελ. 198-202 (in Greek)
- Σταύρος Γιαγκάζογλου, «Ο διάλογος φιλοσοφίας και θεολογίας. Η θεολογική ερμηνευτική του Νίκου Νησιώτη», Θεολογία, τόμ. 84, τχ. 3 (Ιούλιος-Σεπτέμβριος 2013), σελ. 29-49 (in Greek)
