= Dimitrios Kompodietas =

Greek basketball player

Dimitris Kompodietas Δημήτρης Κομποδιέτας
Palaio Faliro B.C.
- Position: Shooting guard / small forward
- League: Greek B Basket League

Personal information
- Born: April 26, 1985 (age 41) Karditsa, Greece
- Listed height: 6 ft 5 in (1.96 m)
- Listed weight: 225 lb (102 kg)

Career information
- NBA draft: 2007: undrafted
- Playing career: 2003–present

Career history
- 2003–2004: Doukas
- 2004–2005: Ano Liosia
- 2005–2006: Alimos
- 2006–2008: Ilysiakos
- 2008–2011: Panellinios
- 2011–2012: Kolossos Rodou
- 2012–2013: Peristeri
- 2013–2014: Nea Kifissia
- 2014–2016: Faros Keratsiniou
- 2016–2017: Doukas
- 2017–2018: Holargos
- 2018–2019: Ionikos Nikaias
- 2019–2020: Amyntas Dafnis
- 2022–present: Palaio Faliro B.C.

Career highlights
- Greek 2nd Division champion (2019)
Medals
Men's basketball
Representing Greece
World Military Championship
| Silver medal – second place | 2012 |

Dimitrios "Dimitris" Kompodietas (alternate spelling: Kobodietas) (Greek: Δημήτρης Κομποδιέτας; born April 26, 1985) is a Greek professional basketball player for Palaio Faliro B.C. of the Greek B Basket League. He is a 1.96 m (6 ft 5 in) tall shooting guard-small forward.

== Professional career ==
Kompodietas began playing basketball with the junior teams of Ano Liosia. He began his pro career with Doukas, in the Greek 2nd Division, during the 2003–04 season. He moved back to Ano Liosia for the 2004–05 season.

He then moved to Alimos, where he again played in the Greek 2nd Division, during the 2005–06 season. He then joined Ilysiakos, where he played again in the Greek 2nd Division, for the next two seasons. He next moved to the 2nd-tier EuroCup team Panellinios.

He then played with Kolossos, Peristeri, and Nea Kifissia in the Greek 1st Division, before signing with the Greek 2nd Division club Faros Keratsiniou.

In 2018, he joined the Greek A2 League club Ionikos Nikaias.

On February 5, 2022, Kompodietas signed with Palaio Faliro B.C.

== National team career ==
Kompodietas was a member of the Greek university national team that played at the 2009 World University Games. He was also a member of the Greek military national team that won the silver medal at the 2012 World Military Championship.
