= Kostas Papadimas =

Greek basketball player

Dinos Papadimas
Personal information
- Born: 1932 Athens, Greece
- Died: May 22, 2021 (aged 88–89)
- Listed height: 6 ft 1.75 in (1.87 m)
- Position: Shooting guard

Career history
- Panellinios

Career highlights
- 2× European Club Champion (1955, 1956); 3× Greek League champion (1953, 1955, 1957)
Medals
Men's Basketball
Representing Greece
Mediterranean Games
Bronze medal – third place	1955 Spain

Konstantinos "Dinos" Papadimas (Greek: Κωνσταντίνος "Ντίνος" Παπαδήμας; 1932 - May 22, 2021) was a Greek former international professional basketball player. During his club playing career, he played at the shooting guard position.

== Professional career ==
Papadimas was a member of the Panellinios Basketball Club and its famous 1950s era "Chrysi Pentada", or "The Golden Five" in English. With Panellinios, he won 3 Greek League championships, in the years 1953, 1955, and 1957. He also won two European Club Championships with the club, as he won the 1955 Brussels Basketball Tournament and the 1956 San Remo Basketball Tournament. While he was also a runner-up at the 1954 San Remo Tournament.

== National team career ==
Papadimas was a member of the senior men's Greek national basketball team. With Greece, he competed at the 1951 Mediterranean Games, the 1952 Summer Olympic Games, and the 1955 Mediterranean Games, where he won a bronze medal.
