= Antonis Christeas =

Greek basketball player and coach

Personal information
- Born: February 1, 1937 Greece
- Died: October 9, 2011 (aged 74) Greece

Career information
- Playing career: 1955–1970

Career history
- 1955–1960: Panellinios
- 1960–1962: Triton
- 1962–1970: AEK Athens

Career highlights
- As a player: 2× European Club Champion (1955, 1956); FIBA European Cup Winners' Cup champion (1968); 8× Greek League champion (1955, 1957, 1963–1966, 1968, 1970)

Antonis Christeas (Greek: Αντώνης Χρηστέας; 1 February 1937 – 9 October 2011) was a Greek professional basketball player of the 1950s and 1960s era.

== Club career ==
Christeas was a key member of Panellinios, and with them he won 2 Greek League championships, in 1955, and 1957. He also won two European Club Championships with the club, as he won the 1955 Brussels Basketball Tournament and the 1956 San Remo Basketball Tournament. He also played with AEK Athens.

With AEK, he won 6 Greek League championships (1963, 1964, 1965, 1966, 1968, 1970). He also won the European-wide secondary level 1967–68 season's FIBA European Cup Winners' Cup, on April 4, 1968, with AEK. In between playing with Panellinios and AEK, he also played with Triton.

== National team career ==
Christeas was also a key member of the senior men's Greek national basketball team, and he finished his career with the national team with 30 caps, in which he scored a total of 397 points. He played at the 1960 Pre-Olympic Tournament, and the 1961 EuroBasket.

== Coaching career ==
Christeas was also a head coach and assistant coach of the Greek youth national teams for many years, and with them, he won a lot of medals.
