= Themis Cholevas =

Greek basketball player and coach

Personal information
- Born: 12 April 1926 Athens, Greece
- Died: 30 December 2007 (aged 81) Athens, Greece
- Listed height: 6 ft 2 in (1.88 m)

Career information
- Playing career: 1945–1958
- Position: Point guard

Career history

Playing
- 1945–58: Panellinios Athens

Coaching
- 1965–67: AEK Athens
- 1966: Olympiacos Piraeus
- 1967-70: Panionios Athens
- 1972-73: AEK Athens
- 1974-75: Maroussi Athens
- 1976: Olympiacos Piraeus
- 1977-78: Sporting Athens
- 1978-79: Panellinios Athens

Career highlights
- As player: 2× European Club Champion (1955, 1956); 3× Greek League champion (1953, 1955, 1957); As a head coach: Greek League champion (1966)
Medals
Men's Basketball
Representing Greece
Mediterranean Games
Bronze medal – third place	1955 Spain
Representing Greece (Head coach)
Mediterranean Games
Bronze medal – third place	1971 Turkey

Themistokles "Themis" Cholevas (Greek: Θεμιστοκλής "Θέμης" Χολέβας; 12 April 1926 – 30 December 2007) was an international Greek professional basketball player and professional basketball coach.

== Professional career ==
Cholevas was the team captain of the Panellinios Basketball Club and its famous 1950s era "Chrysi Pentada", or "The Golden Five" in English. With Panellinios, he won 3 Greek League championships, in the years 1953, 1955, and 1957. He also won two European Club Championships with the club, as he won the 1955 Brussels Basketball Tournament and the 1956 San Remo Basketball Tournament. While he was also a runner-up at the 1954 San Remo Tournament.

== National team career ==
Cholevas also a member of the senior men's Greek national basketball team. With Greece, he competed at the 1951 Mediterranean Games, the 1951 EuroBasket, the 1952 Summer Olympic Games, and the 1955 Mediterranean Games, where he won a bronze medal.

== Coaching career ==
Cholevas also worked as a basketball coach. He coached AEK Athens, and with them, he won the Greek League's 1965–66 season championship. He also won the bronze medal at the 1971 Mediterranean Games, while coaching the Greek national basketball team. He was also Greece's head coach at the 1982 Balkan Championship.

== Track and field ==
Cholevis was also a track and field athlete that competed in the 800 meters.
