= Georgios Moschos =

Greek basketball player

Personal information
- Born: 29 December 1938 Athens, Greece
- Died: 28 December 1966 (aged 27) Athens, Greece

Career information
- Playing career: 1957–1966
- Position: Point guard
- Number: 5

Career history
- 1957–1960: Panellinios Athens
- 1960–1961: Iraklis Salonica
- 1961–1966: AEK Athens

Career highlights
- As a player: 1x FIBA European Selection (1966); 1x FIBA European Champions Cup Semi-Finalist (1965–66); 5× Greek League Champion (1956–57, 1962–1966)

Georgios Moschos (Greek: Γεώργιος Μόσχος; 29 December 1938 – 28 December 1966) was a Greek professional basketball player. He played for Panellinios Athens, Iraklis Salonica, and AEK Athens basketball clubs and died from lymphoma at the age of twenty-eight. He was nicknamed Piccolino.

== Club career ==
Moschos began his professional career with the Greek Basket League club Panellinios in the late 50s. At the age of twenty, he won the first championship of his career with the Panellinios basketball club. He moved to Iraklis Salonica in 1960 and played for the club for one year. In 1961, he joined AEK Athens basketball club, where he won four consecutive championships and reached the semifinals of the 1966 FIBA European Champions Cup. On 16 January 2018, AEK Athens basketball club honored the 60s golden generation, and his daughter received the award.

== National team career ==
Moschos represented Greece once in a friendly game against Romania in 1965.

== FIBA European selection team ==
Moschos, alongside Christos Zoupas, represented the country of Greece in the FIBA All-Star Games in 1966.

== Georgios Moschos Arena ==
In 1989, AEK Athens basketball club named its indoor arena after him to honour his legacy. In 2003, it was demolished as a result of Nikos Goumas stadium demolition and reconstruction plans.

== Awards and accomplishments ==
- Greek Basket League Winner (5): 1956–57, 1962–63, 1963–64, 1964–65, 1965–1966
- FIBA European Champions Cup Semi-Finalist (1): 1965–66

== Filmography ==
- Tassos Boulmetis, 1968 (film), 2018.
