= Pantelis Papaioakeim =

Greek basketball player

Personal information
- Born: 9 September 1975 (age 51) Thessaloniki, Greece
- Listed height: 6 ft 9 in (2.06 m)
- Listed weight: 240 lb (109 kg)

Career information
- Playing career: 1994–2016
- Position: Power forward / center

Career history
- 1994–2000: Philippos Thessaloniki
- 2000–2002: Iraklis
- 2002–2003: Makedonikos
- 2003–2004: AEK Athens
- 2004–2005: Iraklis
- 2005–2006: AEK Athens
- 2006–2008: Panellinios
- 2008–2010: Olympia Larissa
- 2013–2014: Ermis Lagkada
- 2015–2016: Aristotelis
Medals
Men's basketball
Representing Greece
Mediterranean Games
Silver medal – second place	2001 Tunis	Under-26

Panteleimon "Pantelis" Papaioakeim (alternate spelling: Papaeoakeim) (Greek: Παντελεήμων "Παντελής" Παπαϊωακείμ) (born 9 September 1975) is a retired Greek professional basketball player. At a height of 2.06 m (6 ft 9 in) tall, he played at both the power forward and center positions.

== Professional career ==
During his pro career, Papaioakeim played in the top-tier level Greek Basket League, and in the European-wide top-tier level EuroLeague.

== National team career ==
Papaioakeim played with the Greece's under-26 national selection at the 2001 Mediterranean Games, where he won a silver medal.
