= Efthymios Tsakaleris =

Greek professional basketball player (born 1989)

Efthymios Tsakaleris Ευθύμης Τσακαλέρης
Ippokratis Kos
- Position: Power forward / center
- League: Greek B League

Personal information
- Born: July 22, 1989 (age 37) Thessaloniki, Greece
- Listed height: 6 ft 9.5 in (2.07 m)
- Listed weight: 245 lb (111 kg)

Career information
- Playing career: 2009–present

Career history
- 2009–2011: Panellinios
- 2011–2012: PAOK
- 2012–2014: Aris
- 2014–2015: Panelefsiniakos
- 2015: Bashkimi
- 2015–2016: Rethymno Cretan Kings
- 2016–2017: Arkadikos
- 2017–present: Ippokratis Kos
Medals
Men's basketball
Representing Greece
FIBA Europe Under-20 Championship
Gold medal – first place	2009 Greece	National Team

Efthymios Tsakaleris (alternate spellings: Efthimios, Efthymis, Efthimis) (Greek: Ευθύμης Τσακαλέρης; born July 22, 1989) is a Greek professional basketball player. He is a 2.07 m (6 ft 9 1/2 in) tall power forward-center.

== Professional career ==
Tsakaleris began his professional career with Panellinios in the Greek Basket League in 2009. He moved to PAOK in 2011. In 2012, he joined Aris.

In 2014, Tsakaleris joined Panelefsiniakos. In 2015, he joined Rethymno Cretan Kings, after playing two games with Bashkimi in the Kosovo Basketball Superleague. On 24 September 2016, Tsakaleris joined Arkadikos.

== Greek national team ==
With Greece's junior national team, Tsakaleris won the gold medal at the 2009 FIBA Europe Under-20 Championship.
