= Markos Kolokas =

Greek basketball player

Markos Kolokas Μάρκος Κολώκας
Panionios
- Title: Team Manager
- League: Greek Basket League

Personal information
- Born: April 21, 1977 (age 49) Athens, Greece
- Listed height: 6 ft 8 in (2.03 m)
- Listed weight: 240 lb (109 kg)

Career information
- Playing career: 1997–2015
- Position: Small forward / power forward
- Coaching career: 2015–present

Career history

Playing
- 1997–2001: Amyntas
- 2001–2004: Makedonikos
- 2004–2007: Maroussi
- 2007–2008: AEL Larissa
- 2008–2009: Olimpia Larissa
- 2009–2011: Panellinios
- 2011–2012: AENK
- 2012–2014: Psychiko
- 2014–2015: Kymis

Coaching
- 2015–2017: Kymis (Team Manager)
- 2017–2018: Panionios (Team Manager)

Career highlights
- As player: Greek 2nd Division champion (2002); Greek 3rd Division champion (2013); As team manager: Greek 3rd Division champion (2015); Greek 2nd Division champion (2016)

Markos Kolokas (Greek: Μάρκος Κολώκας; born April 21, 1977, in Athens, Greece) is a Greek former professional basketball player and professional basketball coach. At a height of 2.03 m (6 ft 8 in) tall, he played at both the small forward and power forward positions.

== Professional playing career ==
During his professional career as a basketball player, Kolokas played with the following clubs: Amyntas, Makedonikos, Maroussi, AEL Larissa, Olimpia Larissa, Panellinios, AENK, Psychiko, and Kymis.

== Post-playing career ==
After he retired from playing professional basketball, Kolokas worked as the team manager of the Greek club Kymis, and then as the team manager of the Greek club Panionios.
