= Kostas Flevarakis =

Greek basketball coach

Kostas Flevarakis Κώστας Φλεβαράκης
KB Ylli
- Position: Head coach

Personal information
- Born: 24 May 1969 (age 57) Thessaloniki, Greece
- Coaching career: 1988–present

Career history

Coaching
- 1988–1995: PAOK (Cadets, Juniors)
- 1995–1998: PAOK (assistant)
- 1998–1999: PAOK
- 1999–2000: PAOK (assistant)
- 2000–2001: PAOK
- 2002–2003: Panellinios
- 2004–2005: Akropol BBK
- 2005–2010: Sweden
- 2005–2006: Keravnos Strovolou
- 2006-2007: Makedonikos
- 2006-2007: Polpak Świecie
- 2007-2008: PAOK
- 2008-2010: AEK Athens
- 2010-2012: Ilysiakos
- 2012–2013: Phantoms Braunschweig
- 2013-2015: Aries Trikala
- 2015: AZS Koszalin
- 2017–2018: Aries Trikala
- 2018: Rethymno Cretan Kings
- 2018–2019: Astana
- 2019–2020: Kolossos Rodou
- 2020: PAOK
- 2021–2022: Soproni KC
- 2023–present: KB Ylli

Career highlights
- FIBA Asia Champions Cup Bronze Medal (2017); Cypriot Cup winner (2006); Greek Cup winner (1999)

Kostas Flevarakis (Greek: Κώστας Φλεβαράκης; born 24 May 1969) is a Greek professional basketball coach, currently serving as head coach for Kosovo team KB Ylli.

== Coaching career ==
After coaching in the junior teams of PAOK from 1988 to 1995, Flevarakis started working as an assistant coach with the Greek Basket League club PAOK in 1995. He became the head coach of PAOK in 1998. With PAOK, he won the Greek Cup in 1999. He became the head coach of the Greek club AEK in 2010.

Flevarakis worked as an assistant coach for the Milwaukee Bucks NBA Summer League team in 2001.

When he took over Soproni KC in the autumn of 2021, the team had a record of 2-7, and were out of the playoffs. Following Flevarakis' appointment, the team went 13 games unbeaten, the longest win streak in the Hungarian first division, and climbed up to second place in the standings. The streak finally ended on February 16, following a 91–71 loss against Kecskemét.

== Scouting career ==
Flevarakis was also a scout for the NBA club the Denver Nuggets.

== Awards and accomplishments ==
- Greek Cup Winner: (1999)
- Cypriot Cup Winner: (2006)
