= Aristeidis Roubanis =

Personal information
- Born: 9 March 1932 Tripoli, Greece
- Died: 13 January 2018 (aged 85) United States
- Listed height: 6 ft 3.75 in (1.92 m)
- Listed weight: 200 lb (91 kg)
- Position: Power forward / center
- Number: 6, 11, 5

Career history
- Panellinios
- Reyer Venezia
- Motomorini Bologna

Career highlights
- 2× European Club Champion (1955, 1956); 3× Greek League champion (1953, 1955, 1957)
Medals
Men's Basketball
Representing Greece
Mediterranean Games
Bronze medal – third place	1955 Spain

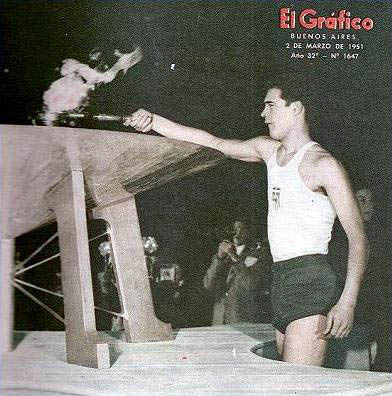
Aristeidis Savvas Roubanis

Aristeidis Savvas Roubanis (alternate spelling: Aristidis) (Greek: Αριστείδης Ρουμπάνης, 9 March 1932, Tripoli – 13 January 2018, Greece) was a Greek international basketball player and javelin thrower. During his club basketball career, his nickname was "Bulldozer".

== Basketball career ==
=== Club career ===
Roubanis was a member of the Panellinios Basketball Club and its famous 1950s era "Golden Five". With Panellinios, he won 3 Greek League championships, in the years 1953, 1955, and 1957. He also won two European Club Championships with the club, as well as the 1955 Brussels Basketball Tournament and the 1956 San Remo Basketball Tournament. He was also a runner-up at the 1954 San Remo Tournament.

=== National team career ===
Roubanis was a member of the senior men's Greek national basketball team. With Greece, Roubanis competed at the 1951 EuroBasket, the 1952 Summer Olympic Games, and the 1955 Mediterranean Games, where he won a bronze medal. He finished his national team career with 25 caps, in which he scored 275 points for the Greek national team.

=== Javelin ===
Roubanis competed in the men's javelin throw, at the 1952 Helsinki Summer Olympics. He also competed in the shot put.

== Personal life ==
Roubanis was the younger brother of Georgios Roubanis, a pole vaulter who won a bronze medal at the 1956 Summer Olympic Games. Georgios was also the 1956 Greek Athlete of the Year.
