= A.C. Doukas Basketball =

Professional greek basketball club

Doukas
- Leagues: A2 Basket League; Greek Cup
- Founded: 1979; 46 years ago
- Arena: Dais Gymnasium
- Capacity: 1,200
- Location: Maroussi, Athens, Greece
- President: Kostantinos Doukas
- Head coach: Marios Gounaris
- Website: doukasbasketball.com
Home	Away

A.C. Doukas Basketball, commonly known as Doukas B.C. or Doukas, (Greek: Αθλητικός Σύλλογος Εκπαιδευτηρίων Δούκα/Α.Σ.Ε.Δ.) is a Greek professional basketball club that is based in Marousi, Athens, Greece. It was founded in 1979, by Doukas School, and its team colours are blue and white. The home arena of the club is the Dais Gymnasium in Marousi. Currently, the men's team plays in Greek A2 League, the Greek second division.

== History ==
Doukas' basketball team was founded in the early 1990s. In the 2013–14 season, the club finished in 10th place in the Greek B League, and remained in the third division. The most successful era of the club's history was the period 2003–2007, when the club played in the A2 Category (second division). In the 2004–05 season, Doukas in finished in 9th place, which was the highest place the club had attained to that point in its presence in the A2 category.

In the 2006–07 season, the club was relegated down to the Greek B League, and from the 2007–08 season, to the 2014–15 season, the club played continuously in the B League. In the 2014–15 season, Doukas finished in 12th place in the B League. But Doukas then merged with the A2 League club Aetos, and was subsequently promoted to the A2.

== Recent seasons ==
Season	Division	Place	Notes
2002–03	Greek B League	3rd	promoted to A2 League
2003–04	Greek A2 League	11th	
2004–05	Greek A2 League	9th	
2005–06	Greek A2 League	13th	
2006–07	Greek A2 League	14th	relegated to B League
2007–08	Greek B League	12th	
2008–09	Greek B League	10th	
2009–10	Greek B League	11th	
2010–11	Greek B League	10th	
2011–12	Greek B League	11th	
2012–13	Greek B League	8th	
2013–14	Greek B League	10th	
2014–15	Greek B League	12th	Merged with Aetos B.C., promoted to A2 League
2015–16	Greek A2 League	7th	
2016–17	Greek A2 League	4th	

== Notable players ==
Note: Flags indicate national team eligibility at FIBA-sanctioned events. Players may hold other non-FIBA nationalities not displayed.

Criteria

To appear in this section a player must have either:

- Set a club record or won an individual award while at the club
- Played at least one official international match for their national team at any time
- Played at least one official NBA match at any time.

- Giannis Giannoulis
- Georgios Kalaitzis
- Vassilis Symtsak
- Apollon Tsochlas
- Sotiris Manolopoulos
- Panagiotis Kafkis
- Dimitrios Kompodietas
- Alexis Kyritsis
- Tasos Spyropoulos
- Georgios Limniatis
- Theodoros Karras
- Manolis Papamakarios
- Andreas Kanonidis
- Nikos Rogkavopoulos
- Iakovos Milentigievits
- / Nikos Pavlos
- Stefan Đorđević
- Guillem Rubio
