= Ioannis Karathanasis =

Greek basketball player

Personal information
- Born: February 17, 1991 (age 35) Thessaloniki, Greece
- Listed height: 6 ft 8 in (2.03 m)
- Listed weight: 225 lb (102 kg)

Career information
- Playing career: 2010–2017
- Position: Small forward

Career history
- 2010–2011: Panellinios
- 2011–2014: Kavala
- 2014–2015: Aris Thessaloniki
- 2015–2017: Aries Trikala
Medals
Men's basketball
Representing Greece
FIBA Under-19 World Cup
Silver medal – second place	2009 New Zealand	Under-19
FIBA Europe Under-20 Championship
Silver medal – second place	2010 Croatia	Under-20
FIBA Europe Under-18 Championship
Gold medal – first place	2008 Greece	Under-18
Albert Schweitzer Tournament
Gold medal – first place	2008 Germany	Under-18

Ioannis Karathanasis (alternate spelling: Giannis) (Greek: Γιάννης Καραθανάσης; born February 17, 1991) is a Greek former professional basketball player. At a height of 2.03 m (6 ft 8 in) tall, he played at both the small forward or power forward positions, with small forward being his primary position.

== Professional career ==
Karathanasis began his basketball career playing with the youth clubs of the Asteria Basketball Academy in Thessaloniki, Greece. He joined the Greek League power Olympiacos in the year 2008, and played with their youth clubs, before going on loan to the semi-pro Greek 3rd Division club Mantoulidis, for the 2009–10 season.

He began his pro career in 2010, when he joined the Greek League club Panellinios. In August 2011, he signed with the Greek League club Kavala. In September 2014, Karathanasis signed a contract with Aris for the 2014–15 season. On September 15, 2015, he was officially signed by Aries Trikala for the 2015–16 season.

== National team career ==
With Greece's junior national teams, Karathanasis won the gold medal at the 2008 Albert Schweitzer Tournament, and the 2008 FIBA Europe Under-18 Championship, as well as the silver medal at the 2009 FIBA Under-19 World Cup.
