= Manos Manouselis =

Greek basketball coach

Personal information
- Born: 27 March 1964 (age 62) Athens, Greece
- Position: Director of Proteas Voulas academies
- Coaching career: 1984–present

Career history

Coaching
- 1983–1987: Estia Filias
- 1987–1988: Akadimia Ilioupoleos
- 1988–1991: Paleo Faliro (w)
- 1991–1997: Sporting Athens
- 1997–1998: Paleo Faliro (m)
- 1998–2002: Panellinios
- 2002–2003: Ilisiakos
- 2003–2005: Panellinios
- 2005–2007: Peristeri
- 2008–2014: Olympiacos (assistant)
- 2017–2019: Al Sadd
- 2019–2020: Shanghai Sharks (assistant)
- 2021–present: Apollon Limassol

Career highlights
- As head coach: 5× Greek Women's League champion (1992–1996); Greek Women's Cup (1995); As assistant coach: Greek Men's Cup (2010)

Manos Manouselis (born 27 April 1964) is a Greek basketball coach. He is currently the director of Proteas Voulas academies.. He has been actively involved in professional basketball for more than three decades.

== Coaching career ==
Manouselis began his career at the very early age of 20 and has been coaching professionally ever since, working for clubs and, since 2004, the Greek National Basketball Team (NBT).

He has won the silver medal at the Men U21 2005 World Championship (Argentina) and the bronze medal at the Men U16 2013 European Championship (Kyiv, Ukraine) as head coach of the respective Greek NBTs.

Manos served as the Assistant Coach of Olympiakos BC, where he was responsible for planning and running daily training sessions and headed the scouting team. During his tenure, Olympiakos reached the Euroleague Final once and won the 2010 Greek Cup.

During his career he has held head coach positions for a number of teams in both the men's and women's professional leagues in Greece, including Panellinios (1999–2005) which he guided back to Greek Division A1 from Division C and Sporting B.C. (1992–1997).

In March 2017 he joined Qatar's Al Sadd. From 2019 to 2020 he served as an assistant coach for the Shanghai Sharks in the Chinese Basketball Association.

== Achievements and awards ==
Club Titles

- Greek Women Cup, Champion (1995).
- Greek Women, Champion (1992–1996).
- Greek A2 / Dev. B Champion (1998–2001, 2003, 2004, 2007).
- Men's U21 World Championship, 2nd place (2005).
- EuroLeague Final Four, semi-finalist (2009).
- Greek Cup, champion (2010).
- EuroLeague Final Four, finalist (2010).
- Men's U16 Sakarya World Tournament, 1st place (2013).
- Men's U16 European Championship, 3rd place (2013).
