= Mimis Stefanidis =

Greek professional basketball player

Personal information
- Born: 28 October 1931 (age 95) Kypseli, Athens, Greece
- Listed height: 6 ft 0 in (1.83 m)

Career information
- Playing career: 1945–1960
- Position: Small forward

Career history
- 1945–1955: Panellinios
- 1955–1956: Olimpia Milano
- 1956–1957: Reyer Venezia
- 1957–1960: Panellinios

Career highlights
- 2× European Club Champion (1955, 1956); 3× Greek League champion (1953, 1955, 1957)
Medals
Men's Basketball
Representing Greece
Mediterranean Games
Bronze medal – third place	1955 Spain

Dimitrios "Mimis" Stefanidis (Greek: Δημήτριος "Μίμης" Στεφανίδης, born 28 October 1931) is a former international professional basketball player and basketball coach, from Greece. He was born in Athens.

== Professional career ==
Stefanidis was a member of the Panellinios Basketball Club and its famous 1950s era "Chrysi Pentada", or "The Golden Five" in English. With Panellinios, he won 3 Greek League championships, in the years 1953, 1955, and 1957. He also won two European Club Championships with the club, as he won the 1955 Brussels Basketball Tournament and the 1956 San Remo Basketball Tournament. While he was also a runner-up at the 1954 San Remo Tournament.

== National team career ==
Stefanidis was a member of the senior men's Greek national basketball team. With Greece, he competed at the following tournaments: the 1951 Mediterranean Games, the 1951 EuroBasket, the 1952 Summer Olympic Games, and the 1955 Mediterranean Games, where he won a bronze medal.

== Coaching career ==
After his basketball playing career ended, Stefanidis became a basketball coach. He worked as a coach in teams such as Panellinios, Pagrati, Sporting, Panathinaikos, and Olympiacos.

== Personal ==
His daughter is Tatiana Stefanidou.
