= Makis Dreliozis =

Greek basketball player

Makis Dreliozis Μάκης Δρελιώζης
Personal information
- Born: March 31, 1975 (age 51) Athens, Greece
- Listed height: 6 ft 7 in (2.01 m)
- Listed weight: 200 lb (91 kg)

Career information
- Playing career: 1990–2009
- Position: Shooting guard / small forward

Career history
- 1990–1996: Panionios
- 1996–1997: Libertas Forlì
- 1997–2001: Panionios
- 2001–2003: AGE Chalkida
- 2003–2005: Panellinios
- 2005–2006: Dafni
- 2006–2008: Gyziakos
- 2008–2009: Panionios

Career highlights
- Greek 2nd Division champion (2004)

Prodromos "Makis" Dreliozis (Greek: Πρόδρομος "Μάκης" Δρελιώζης; born March 31, 1975, in Athens, Greece), is a retired Greek professional basketball player. At 2.01 m (6 ft. 7 in.) in height and 91 kg. (200 lbs.) in weight, he played at the shooting guard and small forward positions.

== Professional career ==
Dreliozis made his pro debut in 1990, with Panionios, at the age of 15 years and 6 months. He was the youngest player to have played in the top-tier level Greek Basket League, from the time the league had formed into the A1 national category, in the 1986–87 season. Georgios Papagiannis holds the current mark for being the youngest player to play in the league, under its current format (since 1992–93).

Dreliozis was the first Greek basketball player to use the Bosman ruling, when he signed with the Italian League club Libertas Forlì, in 1996.
