= Christos Tsekos (basketball) =

Greek basketball player

Personal information
- Born: April 4, 1966 (age 60) Athens, Greece
- Listed height: 6 ft 10.75 in (2.10 m)
- Listed weight: 300 lb (136 kg)

Career information
- NBA draft: 1988: undrafted
- Playing career: 1984–1999
- Position: Center
- Number: 11

Career history
- 1984–1988: Panellinios
- 1988–1992: Iraklis
- 1992–1997: PAOK
- 1998–1999: Irakleio

Career highlights
- FIBA Korać Cup champion (1994); Greek Cup winner (1995); Greek 2nd Division champion (1987)

Christos Tsekos (Greek: Χρήστος Τσέκος; born April 4, 1966, in Athens, Greece) is a retired Greek professional basketball player. He played professionally in the Greek Basket League, and he represented Greece at the senior level.

== Professional career ==
Tsekos played with Panellinios, Iraklis, and PAOK. While playing with PAOK, Tsekos, won the FIBA Korać Cup in 1994, and the Greek Cup in 1995. He was also a FIBA European Cup Winners' Cup finalist in 1996, and a EuroLeague semifinalist in 1993.

== National team career ==
Tsekos played at the 1993 EuroBasket, and he was a member of the senior men's Greek national team that finished in 4th place at the 1994 FIBA World Championship. He played in 54 games with Greece's senior national team, scoring a total of 78 points.
