= Panellinios B.C. in international competitions =

Greek professional basketball club

Panellinios B.C. in international competitions is the history and statistics of Panellinios B.C. in FIBA Europe and Euroleague Basketball Company European-wide club basketball competitions.

== European competitions ==
Record	Round	Opponent club		
1958 FIBA European Champions Cup 1st–tier
0–2	2n round	(Romania) Steaua București	60–63 (h)	72–75 (a)
1974–75 FIBA Korać Cup 3rd–tier
1–1	2nd round	(Belgium) Sunair Oostende	70–68 (h)	65–79 (a)
1975–76 FIBA Korać Cup 3rd–tier
1–1	2nd round	(Socialist Federal Republic of Yugoslavia) Jugoplastika	78–63 (h)	61–105 (a)
1977–78 FIBA Korać Cup 3rd–tier
1–1	1st round	(Italy) Scavolini Pesaro	77–67 (h)	47–92 (a)
1978–79 FIBA Korać Cup 3rd–tier
1–1	1st round	(Belgium) Verviers-Pepinster	58–53 (h)	54–81 (a)
1980–81 FIBA Korać Cup 3rd–tier
0–2	1st round	(Israel) Hapoel Haifa	63–102 (a)	77–96 (h)
1987–88 FIBA European Cup Winner's Cup 2nd–tier
1–1	1st round	(Portugal) Porto	84–82 (h)	61–77 (a)
2007–08 ULEB Cup 2nd–tier
1–9	Regular season	(Belgium) Telindus Oostende	84–77 (h)	71–83 (a)
1–9	Regular season	(Serbia) Crvena zvezda	69–79 (a)	81–83 (h)
1–9	Regular season	(Czech Republic) ČEZ Nymburk	65–75 (a)	77–86 (h)
1–9	Regular season	(Russia) Dynamo Moscow	76–83 (h)	73–107 (a)
1–9	Regular season	(Italy) Beghelli Bologna	59–83 (a)	67–85 (h)
2008–09 Eurocup 2nd–tier
7–9	Qualifying round 1	(Germany) Telekom Baskets Bonn	69–54 (h)	85–70 (a)
7–9	Qualifying round 2	(Ukraine) Kyiv	96–69 (h)	72–96 (a)
7–9	Regular season	(Greece) Aris	69–71 (h)	77–72 (a)
7–9	Regular season	(Turkey) Türk Telekom	64–70 (a)	82–74 (h)
7–9	Regular season	(Israel) Bnei HaSharon	85–70 (h)	76–78 (a)
7–9	Top 16	(Russia) Dynamo Moscow	84–91 (a)	72–77 (h)
7–9	Top 16	(Greece) Maroussi Costa Coffee	59–71 (h)	85–83 (a)
7–9	Top 16	(Russia) Khimki	73–89 (h)	94–101 (a)
2009–10 Eurocup 2nd–tier
10–8	Qualifying round	(Latvia) VEF Rīga	94–79 (a)	74–79 (h)
10–8	Regular season	(Spain) Gran Canaria 2014	89–60 (h)	51–73 (a)
10–8	Regular season	(France) Nancy	81–72 (a)	77–64 (h)
10–8	Regular season	(Poland) Turów Zgorzelec	83–65 (h)	76–81 (a)
10–8	Top 16	(Germany) Brose Baskets	70–62 (h)	81–84 (a)
10–8	Top 16	(Spain) Bizkaia Bilbao	61–81 (a)	77–70 (h)
10–8	Top 16	(Italy) Benetton Treviso	88–79 (h)	85–81 (a)
10–8	QF	(Spain) Gran Canaria 2014	81–70 (h)	68–75 (a)
10–8	SF	(Spain) Power Electronics Valencia	80–92; April 17, Fernando Buesa Arena, Vitoria-Gasteiz	
10–8	3rd place game	(Spain) Bizkaia Bilbao	67–76; April 18, Fernando Buesa Arena, Vitoria-Gasteiz	
2010–11 Eurocup 2nd–tier
5–7	Regular season	(Italy) Bennet Cantù	57–72 (a)	59–54 (h)
5–7	Regular season	(Netherlands) GasTerra Flames	68–51 (h)	63–57 (a)
5–7	Regular season	(Turkey) Galatasaray Café Crown	53–79 (a)	66–62 (h)
5–7	Top 16	(Spain) Cajasol	82–87 (h)	71–84 (a)
5–7	Top 16	(Germany) Alba Berlin	65–68 (a)	86–73 (h)
5–7	Top 16	(Italy) Benetton Bwin Treviso	75–83 (h)	72–82 (a)

== See also ==
- Greek basketball clubs in international competitions
