= Alekos Petroulas =

Greek basketball player

Alekos Petroulas Αλέκος Πέτρουλας
No. 14 – Megaridis
- Position: Power forward / center
- League: Greek B League

Personal information
- Born: June 2, 1978 (age 48) Athens, Greece
- Listed height: 6 ft 7.5 in (2.02 m)
- Listed weight: 235 lb (107 kg)

Career information
- Playing career: 1997–present

Career history
- 1997–1998: Esperos Kallitheas
- 1999–2000: Peristeri
- 2000–2004: Ilysiakos
- 2004–2006: Makedonikos
- 2006–2010: Panellinios
- 2010–2013: Peristeri
- 2013–2014: Psychiko
- 2014–2015: Aetos
- 2015–2016: Peristeri
- 2016–2017: Panelefsiniakos
- 2018–present: Megaridis

Alexandros "Alekos" Petroulas (Greek: Αλέξανδρος "Αλέκος" Πέτρουλας; born June 2, 1978) is a Greek professional basketball player. At a height of 2.02 m (6 ft 7 1/2 in) tall, he can play at both the power forward and center positions.

== Professional career ==
During his professional club career, Petroulas has played with some of the following Greek clubs: Esperos Kallitheas, Peristeri, Ilysiakos, Makedonikos, Panellinios, Psychiko, Aetos, and Panelefsiniakos.
