= Damir Mulaomerović =

Croatian basketball player and coach

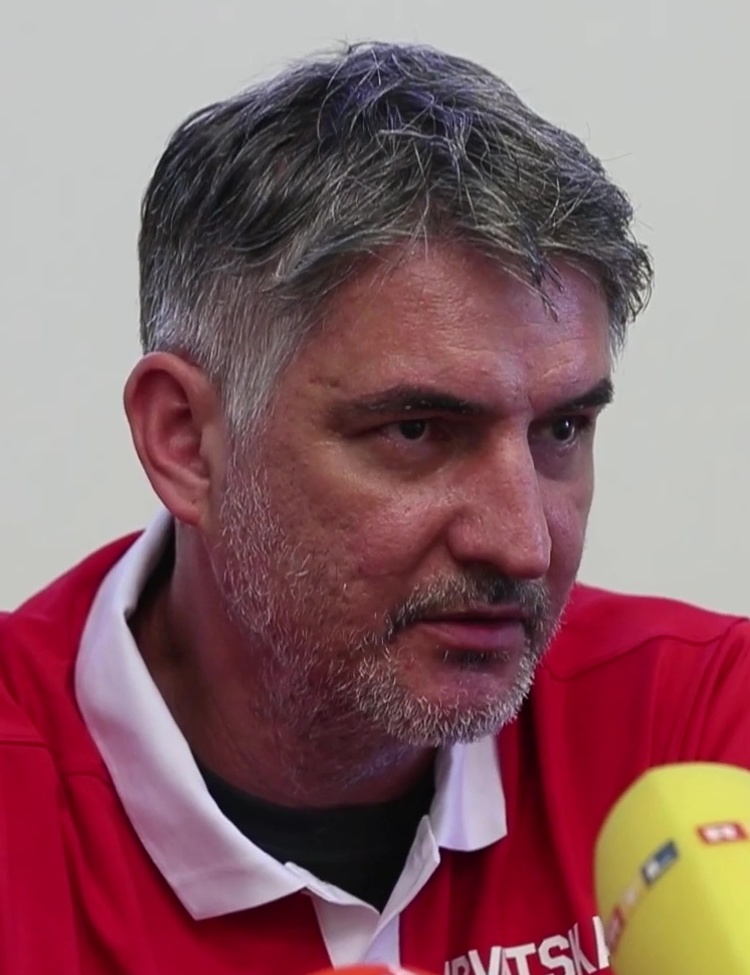

Personal information
- Born: 19 September 1974 (age 52) Tuzla, SR Bosnia and Herzegovina, Yugoslavia
- Listed height: 6 ft 4.75 in (1.95 m)
- Listed weight: 215 lb (98 kg)

Career information
- Playing career: 1990–2012
- Position: Point guard
- Coaching career: 2013–present

Career history

Playing
- 1990–1994: Sloboda Dita
- 1994–1998: Cibona
- 1998–1999: Fortitudo Bologna
- 1999–2001: Efes Pilsen
- 2001–2002: Panathinaikos
- 2002: Snaidero Udine
- 2002–2003: Real Madrid
- 2003–2005: PAOK
- 2005–2006: Panellinios
- 2006–2007: Olympiacos
- 2007: Bruesa GBC
- 2007–2008: Cibona
- 2008–2009: PAOK
- 2009–2012: Zagreb

Coaching
- 2013–2015: Sloboda Tuzla
- 2015–2017: Cibona
- 2016: Bosnia and Herzegovina
- 2018–2019: Kosovo
- 2018–2019: Prishtina
- 2019–2021: Sloboda Tuzla
- 2021–2024: Cedevita Junior
- 2024–: Dinamo Zagreb

Career highlights
- As player: EuroLeague champion (2002); Greek League Top Scorer (2006); 3× Greek League assists leader (2003–2005); 5× Croatian League champion (1995–1998, 2011); Bosnian Cup winner (1994); 5× Croatian Cup winner (1995, 1996, 2009–2011); Italian Supercup winner (1998); Turkish Cup winner (2001); FIBA EuroStar (1997); 3× Greek All-Star (2004–2006); As head coach: Kosovo League champion (2019); Kosovo Cup winner (2019)

Damir Mulaomerović (born 19 September 1974) is a Croatian professional basketball coach and former player who is the current coach of KK Dinamo Zagreb.

== Professional career ==
Mulaomerović started his career with Sloboda Dita in 1990. Not too long after the start of the Bosnian War, he fled to Zagreb and where he joined Cibona Zagreb. Mulaomerović played there until the end of the 1997–1998 season. He left Cibona, to join Fortitudo Bologna. He also played with Real Madrid.

In Greece, he left a big mark. He won the EuroLeague championship with Panathinaikos, in 2001–02. While he played with PAOK and Panellinios, he was one of the Greek League's leading assist and point scoring players. At the start of the 2006–2007 season, he had been signed by Olympiacos, in order to fill the void created in the team by Arvydas Macijauskas' start of the season severe injury. But in Olympiacos, he did not get along with head coach Pini Gershon, and before the end of season, he got an early termination of his contract.

After Olympiacos, he was signed by Bruesa GBC, on 22 January 2007, but because of an injury, he did not play as expected. During the summer of 2007, he was in serious contract discussions with Cedevita Zagreb, from Croatia, but after Cibona approached him, he did not have to think twice about which team he was to join. He signed a 1-year contract with his former team, Cibona.

After 9 years, he returned to Cibona Zagreb. Saying that he was, "excited about his return, and that it had always been a privilege and commitment to play for Cibona". He was brought to them by the special insistence of the new Cibona head coach, former Croatian basketball player, Josip "Joke" Vranković. He expressed his desire to finish his career with Cibona.

In January 2009, he joined another basketball club from the Croatian capital, KK Zagreb. Although being a veteran, he was a key player in Zagreb's first ever Croatian League championship title, won in 2011. The next season, as Zagreb was eliminated on a title defending path in May 2012, Mulaomerović announced his retirement.

== National team career ==
=== Bosnia and Herzegovina ===
Muaomerović was born in the Bosnian city of Tuzla, which he left as a refugee at the outbreak of the Bosnian War. He wanted to represent the newly formed Bosnia and Herzegovina national team, but did not receive an invitation to do so.

=== Croatia ===
Mulaomerović accepted the call-up from Petar Skansi, then senior Croatia's head coach. Mulaomerović represented Croatia at the 1996 Summer Olympics, EuroBasket 1997, EuroBasket 1999, EuroBasket 2001 and EuroBasket 2003.

== Coaching career ==
Mulaomerović started his basketball coaching career soon after his retirement from playing professional basketball, taking over as head coach his hometown club, Sloboda Tuzla, in 2013.

On 7 December 2015, Mulaomerović was appointed head coach for Cibona. In June 2017 after reaching the finals of the national league and cup, which Cibona both lost to Cedevita, Mulaomerović parted ways with the club.

In 2016 the Basketball Federation of Bosnia and Herzegovina named Mulaomerović as the new head coach of the senior Bosnia and Herzegovina men's national team, but Bosnia did not qualify to EuroBasket 2017 finals, so Mulaomerović was sacked.

In August 2018 Mulaomerović took over the senior Kosovo men's national team. Two months later he became head coach for KB Prishtina, the most prominent club playing in the Kosovo Basketball Superleague.

On 29 November 2019, he moved back to Sloboda Tuzla as head coach. In February 2020, ahead of the start of the EuroBasket 2022 qualifying tournament, Mulaomerović joined Croatia men's national team coaching staff under the head coach Veljko Mršić.

In May 2021, Mulaomerović signed a deal with Cedevita Junior of the Croatian League as their head coach.

On 24 January 2022, Mulaomerović was confirmed as the new head coach of the Croatia men's national basketball team after Veljko Mršić resigned. Mulaomerović led the Croatia national team at the EuroBasket 2022 which they exited in the round of 16. Subsequently, he stepped down from his position.
