= Đuro Ostojić =

Montenegrin basketball player and executive

partizN
- Title: General manager

Personal information
- Born: 17 February 1976 (age 50) Bar, SR Montenegro, SFR Yugoslavia
- Listed height: 2.09 m (6 ft 10 in)

Career information
- NBA draft: 1998: undrafted
- Playing career: 1993–2011
- Position: Center

Career history
- 1993–1997: Mornar
- 1997–1999: Budućnost Podgorica
- 1999–2001: Lovćen
- 2001–2004: Partizan
- 2004–2006: Breogán
- 2006–2007: Beşiktaş Cola Turka
- 2007: PAOK
- 2007–2008: Gravelines-Dunkerque
- 2008–2011: Panellinios
Medals
Men's basketball
Representing FR Yugoslavia
'22 & under' World Championship
| Bronze medal – third place | 1997 Australia | U22 Team |

Đuro Ostojić (Serbian Cyrillic: Ђуро Остојић; born 17 February 1976) is a Montenegrin retired professional basketball executive and former player who is a general manager for Studentski centar. At 2.09 m (6 ft 10 1/2 in), he played the center position.

== Professional career ==
In his professional career, Ostojić has played with Mornar, Budućnost Podgorica, Lovćen, Partizan, Breogán, Beşiktaş Cola Turka, PAOK, Gravelines-Dunkerque and Panellinios.

== National team ==
Ostojić represented Serbia and Montenegro at the EuroBasket 2003 and the 2004 Summer Olympics. He was also a member of the Montenegrin national team.
