= Panellinios B.C. =

Panellinios Basket
- Nickname: Ολυμπιονίκες (Olympians)
- Leagues: Greek 3rd Division
- Founded: Parent Athletic Club: 1891; Basketball Club: 1929
- History: Panellinios B.C. Athens (1929–2010, 2011-present); Panellinios B.C. Lamia (2010–2011)
- Arena: Panellinios Indoor Hall
- Capacity: 1,800
- Location: Athens, Greece
- Team colors: Blue and White
- Championships: Greek Championship (6): 1929, 1939, 1940, 1953, 1955, 1957; Greek 2nd Division (2): (1987, 2004); European Club Championship (2): 1955 Brussels Tournament; 1956 San Remo Tournament
- Website: panelliniosac.gr
Home	Away

Panellinios B.C. (Greek: Πανελλήνιος K.A.E.) or Panellinios Basket, full name Panellinios B.C. Athens, is a professional basketball club that is located in Athens, Greece. The club was founded in 1929.

The name Panellinios can be translated as Pan-Hellenic in English, and can be interpreted to mean "The Greek Nation". B.C. stands for basketball club. So the club's name can be interpreted to mean "The National Basketball Club". The Greek multi-sports club Panathinaikos A.O. was founded by Panellinios G.S. athletes. The club was previously owned by the Greek businessman Minos Kyriakou.

== History ==
The parent athletic club, Panellinios Gymnastikos Syllogos, was founded in Athens in 1891, making it one of the oldest sports clubs in Europe. It had a team of gymnasts compete at the 1896 Summer Olympics in Athens. The team's leader was Sotirios Athanasopoulos. Members included Nikolaos Andriakopoulos, Petros Persakis, Thomas Xenakis, and 29 others. The team placed second out of the three teams in the parallel bars team event, earning a silver medal (retroactively awarded by the International Olympic Committee, as the awards at the first Olympic Games differed from the gold, silver, bronze format used later).

The Greek multi-sport club Panathinaikos was founded by Giorgos Kalafatis in 1908, when he and 40 other athletes decided to break away from Panellinios Gymnastikos Syllogos, following the club's decision to discontinue its football team. In 1929, the athletic association's basketball department, Panellinios B.C. Athens was founded, and that same year the club won the Athens basketball championship.

=== The "Golden Five" era ===
Panellinios has been the top tier level Greek League's champion 6 successive seasons (1929, 1939, 1940, 1953, 1955, and 1957). In the club's early years, it featured the player Missas Pantazopoulos. The club would have likely won several more Greek championships during the 1940s, but could not because the league was temporarily disbanded because of World War II. In the early 1950s era, the team was called "The Golden Five" ("Chrysi Pentada" in Greek), or "The Fabulous Five". "The Golden Five" consisted of Themis Cholevas (PG), Dinos Papadimas (SG), Mimis Stefanidis (SF), Panos Manias (PF), and Aristeidis Roubanis (C). "The Golden Five" dominated not only Greek club basketball, but European club basketball in general. The Panellinios team also headlined the Greek 1952 Summer Olympics basketball team. Although the EuroLeague, then known as the FIBA European Champions Cup, was not formed until the 1958 season, it is widely believed that had it been formed earlier, that Panellinios would have won several EuroLeague championships, as many considered Panellinios to be the best club team in Europe during the early-to-mid 1950s. In that era, the head coach of the team was Nikos Nissiotis.

During that era, Panellinios took part in the biggest international club tournaments in Europe, the predecessor tournaments of the EuroLeague, that were then held instead of the EuroLeague tournament. The club advanced to the final of the 1954 San Remo Tournament, which they lost 81–74 to the Italian League club Olimpia Milano. Panellinios then won the 1955 Brussels Tournament, by defeating the Yugoslav League club Red Star Belgrade in the final, by a score of 91–67. Panellinios also won the 1956 San Remo Tournament, by defeating the Italian League club Virtus Bologna, by a score of 67–37.

In the inaugural 1958 season, the European 1st tier level European Champions Cup (now known as the EuroLeague) was formed. By that time, the team was coming to the end of The Golden Five era, as only 2 players of The Golden Five remained on the team. The club was eliminated from the competition, after losing its series against Steaua SA Bucarest 2 games to 0, by scores of 63–60 and 75–72. During that era, the team also featured the great scorers Antonis Christeas and Georgios Moschos.

=== After the "Golden Five" era ===
The team stayed in the top tier Greek basketball division for 23 consecutive seasons, starting in 1963, when the league was re-formed into a new format. The club finished third in the top Greek League in both 1970 and 1978. During this era, it was the legendary Greek player Vassilis Goumas, that was the leader of the team. In the 1970–71 season, Panellinios player Paraskevas Tsantalis, scored 73 points in a Greek Basket league game against Panionios.

The club also finished as the runner-up in the Greek Cup in 1987. Panellinios also participated in the European 2nd-tier level FIBA European Cup Winners' Cup (Saporta Cup), and in the European 3rd tier level FIBA Korać Cup competition, several times during the 1970s and 1980s.

=== Rise and return to First Greek Division ===
The club struggled in the 1990s, and was mired in the third and fourth divisions of the Greek lower leagues. New management came to the organization in 1999, when Minos Kyriakou took over the club, and the club would eventually again begin to establish itself as a strong presence in Greek basketball. In 2004, Panellinios returned to the top-level Greek League, after earning a league promotion, led by Marijan Kraljević and the Soulis brothers.

In 2006, the team advanced to the playoff round of the Greek League, led by Dimitrios Tsaldaris, Damir Mulaomerović and Ruben Boumtje-Boumtje, and finished 6th in the league, after losing in the playoffs to Aris. In 2007, the club finished in 5th place in the league, with players such as Mamadou N'Diaye, Michalis Pelekanos, Gary Trent, and Anthony Goldwire. The team lost to Panionios in the playoffs, but in finishing 5th in the Greek League, qualified for the new European 2nd tier level EuroCup competition, for the first time in club history.

In 2010, the club moved from Athens, where it had been based for 81 years, to the city of Lamia. In March 2010, Minos Kyriakou, withdrew from the club's ownership position. In 2011, the club moved back to Athens.

=== Relegation and recent years ===
In the 2011–12 season, the Greek Professional Sports Committee stripped Panellinios of its professional licence, because the club faced economic problems. In addition, the club wasn't accepted by the lower tiers of the Greek basketball league system, and thus didn't play in any league during that season. The next season (2012–13), Panellinios played in the A ESKA Category (the First Athenian Regional Division). But the team's presence in the league wasn't successful. It finished in last place, and was relegated to the B ESKA Category.

== Arenas ==
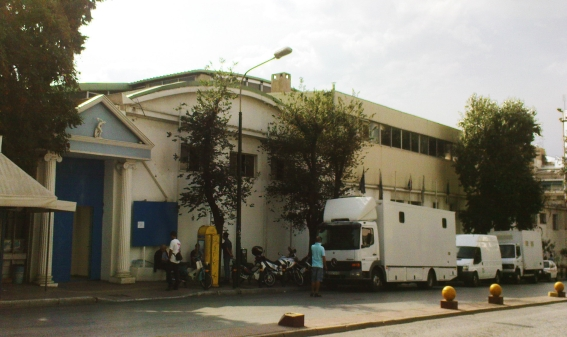
Panellinios Indoor Hall

Panellinios flag

The club plays its Greek League home games at Panellinios Indoor Hall, a small arena with a capacity of 1,800 seats. and played its EuroCup home games at either the 4,000 capacity seat Indoor Hall Peristeriou, or at the Hellinikon Olympic Arena, which has a capacity of 15,000 seats.

When the club moved to Lamia, its domestic Greek League and EuroCup home games were hosted at the Lamia Arena, which has a seating capacity of 5,000 seats.

== Honours and titles ==
=== European competitions ===
- European International Club Tournament

Champions (2): 1955 Brussels Tournament, 1956 San Remo Tournament
Runners-up (1): 1954 San Remo Tournament

- EuroCup

Final Four (1): 2009–10

=== Domestic competitions ===
- Greek League

Champions (6): 1928–29, 1938–39, 1939–40, 1952–53, 1954–55, 1956–57
Runners-up (4): 1934–35, 1949–50, 1950–51, 1953–54

- Greek Cup

Runners-up (1): 1986–87

- Greek League A2

Champions (2): 1986–87, 2003–04

- Greek League C

Champions (1): 1998–99

- Mavroskoufia Basketball Tournament

Winners (1): 2009

== Seasons ==
Season	Greek League	Greek Cup	Europe	Head coach	Roster
1928–29	Champion	–	–		Christos Svolopoulos, Dimitris Sidiropoulos, Evangelinos, Sfikas, Spyridakis, Alexandros Sidiropoulos, Symeonidis, Skepers
1934–35	Finalist	–	–		
1938–39	Champion	–	–		Missas Pantazopoulos, Christos Svolopoulos, Symeonidis, Skylogiannis, Floros, Kostopoulos, Eleftheroudakis, Naslas, Levantinos
1939–40	Champion	–	–		Missas Pantazopoulos, Christos Svolopoulos, Symeonidis, Skylogiannis, Floros, Kostopoulos, Eleftheroudakis, Naslas, Levantinos
1949–50	Finalist	–	–	Nikos Nissiotis	Themis Cholevas, Dinos Papadimas, Mimis Stefanidis, Panos Manias, Aristeidis Roubanis
1950–51	Finalist	–	–	Nikos Nissiotis	Themis Cholevas, Dinos Papadimas, Mimis Stefanidis, Panos Manias, Aristeidis Roubanis
1952–53	Champion	–	–	Nikos Nissiotis	Themis Cholevas, Dinos Papadimas, Mimis Stefanidis, Panos Manias, Aristeidis Roubanis
1953–54	Finalist	–	European Club Championship; Finalist	Nikos Nissiotis	Themis Cholevas, Dinos Papadimas, Mimis Stefanidis, Panos Manias, Aristeidis Roubanis
1954–55	Champion	–	European Club Championship; Champion	Nikos Nissiotis	Themis Cholevas, Dinos Papadimas, Mimis Stefanidis, Panos Manias, Aristeidis Roubanis, Antonis Christeas
1955–56	Not held	–	European Club Championship; Champion	Nikos Nissiotis	Themis Cholevas, Dinos Papadimas, Mimis Stefanidis, Panos Manias, Aristeidis Roubanis, Antonis Christeas
1956–57	Champion	–	–	Nikos Nissiotis	Themis Cholevas, Dinos Papadimas, Mimis Stefanidis, Panos Manias, Aristeidis Roubanis, Antonis Christeas, Georgios Moschos, Sakkelis, Mavroleon, Karvelas, Makrinikolas, Dimitris Lekkas
1957–58	_	–	EuroLeague; Last 32	Nikos Nissiotis	Themis Cholevas, Dinos Papadimas, Mimis Stefanidis, Antonis Christeas, Mavroleon, Georgios Moschos, Sakkelis, Dimitris Lekkas, Makrinikolas, Ieremiadis, Drulias, Anagnostopoulos, Karakasis, Karvellas
1959–60	3rd place	not held	_		Antonis Christeas, Pitsinos, Vassilis Giousmas, Dimitris Lekkas, Karakasis, Georgios Moschos, Kremydas
1961–62	6th place	not held	_		Antonis Christeas, Pitsinos, Vassilis Giousmas, Dimitris Lekkas, Veloudos, Filippakis, Voloudos, Palmas, Kaketsis, Katetsis, Karantzalis, Adamopoulos
1962–63	4th place	not held	_		Vassilis Goumas, Veloudos, Vassilis Giousmas, Pitsinos, Dimitris Lekkas, Karatzalis, Kaketsis, Savvidis, Papaioannou, Adamopoulos, Kondulis
1963–64	6th place	not held	_		Pitsinos, Veloudos, Dimitris Lekkas, Filippakis, Mourmounis, Kaketsis Paraskevas Tsantalis, Vassilis Goumas, Vassilis Giousmas,
1964–65	9th place	not held	_		Dimitris Lekkas, Spanidis, Kondylis, Paraskevas Tsantalis, Flouri, Svarnas, Papavasileiou, Panathinaikosunis, Pappas
1968–69	7th place	not held	_		Vassilis Goumas, Elias Vlavakis, Livanos, Vassilis Giousmas, Paraskevas Tsantalis, Lignos, Dimitris Lekkas, Tomaras, Margetis, Hadios, Spanidis
1969–70	3rd place	_	_		Vassilis Goumas, Paraskevas Tsantalis, Elias Vlavakis, Vassilis Giousmas
1974–75	_	–	Korać Cup; Last 32		Vassilis Goumas, Maragos, Paraskevas Tsantalis, Andreas Haikalis, Sarantis Papachristopoulos, Passaris, Dimitris Lekkas, Elias Vlavakis, Evthimiou
1975–76	_	Last 32	Korać Cup; Last 16		Vassilis Goumas, Manolas, Maragos, Koligris, Evthimiou, Dimitris Lekkas, Sarantis Papachristopoulos, Kallas, Lignos, Andreas Haikalis, Elias Vlavakis
1977–78	3rd place	Last 16	Korać Cup; Last 16		Vassilis Goumas, Sarantis Papachristopoulos, Kalas, Sotos, Kaligros, Paraskevas Tsantalis, Elias Vlavakis, Andreas Haikalis
1978–79	_	Last 8	Korać Cup; Last 32		Vassilis Goumas, Sarantis Papachristopoulos, Maragos, Andreas Haikalis, Laskaris, Koligris, Triantafillou
1980–81	_	Last 16	Korać Cup; Last 32		Maragos, Barbas, Halatsiadis, Triantafillou, Koligris, Sarantis Papachristopoulos, Kirmanis, Evthimiou, Nikolakopoulos, Anagnostou
1986–87	2nd Division Champion	Finalist		Nikos Pavlou	Giannopoulos, Antonis Stamatis, Vassilis Dakouris, Albert Mallach, Christos Tsekos, Andreas Papandraklakis, Kostas Katsimpas, Stamatis Tsapralis, Kimon Kokorogiannis, Andreas Zafeiropoulos
1987–88	9th place	Semifinalist	Cup Winners' Cup; Last 32	Aris Raftopoulos	Andreas Papandraklakis, Stamatis Politis, Stamatis Tsapralis, Christos Tsekos, Antonis Stamatis, Albert Mallach, Andreas Zafeiropoulos, Kostas Katsimpas, Vassilis Dakouris, Kimon Kokorogiannis
1988–99	4th Division 2nd	n/a		Manos Manouselis	Ioannis Sakellariou, Giorgos Koumoulos, Tolis Koutroulias, Angelos Georgalas, Eirinaios Karamanis, Ilias Moutran, Labros Kanellopoulos, Filippos Moschovitis, Angelos Siamandouras
1999–00	3d Division 2nd	Last 32		Manos Manouselis	Ioannis Sakellariou, Giorgos Koumoulos, Tolis Koutroulias, Angelos Georgalas, Eirinaios Karamanis, Ilias Moutran, Labros Kanellopoulos, Filippos Moschovitis, Lefteris Stratakis
2000–01	2nd Division 7th	Last 32		Manos Manouselis	Alexis Tsamatos, Ioannis Sakellariou, Eirinaios Karamanis, Vangelis Tsiakas, Giorgos Koumoulos, Ilias Moutran, Filippos Symeonidis, Labros Kanellopoulos, Angelos Georgalas, Matthew Alosa, Tolis Koutroulias, Angelos Siamandouras, Lefteris Stratakis
2001–02	2nd Division 3d	Last 32		Manos Manouselis, Kostas Flevarakis	Dimitris Podaras, Kostas Daniil, Alexis Tsamatos, Ioannis Sakellariou, Vangelis Tsiakas, Giorgos Koumoulos, Thanasis Kamariotis, Andreas Glyniadakis, Jimmy Georgaros, Vangelis Logothetis, Alvaro Tor, Iiro Tenngren, Dimitris Karaplis
2002–03	2nd Division 4th	Last 32		Kostas Flevarakis, Nikos Pavlou, Kostas Diamantopoulos	Tomas Jofresa, Kostas Daniil, Vangelis Tsiakas, Ioannis Sakellariou, Anatoly Zourpenko, Antonios Asimakopoulos, Tasos Kantartzis, Vassilis Soulis, Christos Petropoulos, Dimitris Karatzios, Savvas Nikitakis, Thymios Kyritsis, Kostas Tziallas, Jean-Gael Percevaut, Charles Madic
2003–04	2nd Division Champion	Last 42		Manos Manouselis	Makis Dreliozis, Dimitris Koronis, Michalis Yfantis, Ilias Tsopis, Marijan Kraljević, Labros Kanellopoulos, Dinos Tzialas, Alexis Tsamatos, Vangelis Morfis, Nikos Kritsalos, Tassos Kantartzis, Georgios Limniatis, Ioannis Sakellariou, Georgios Bozikas, Tasos Kantartzis
2004–05	12th place	Last 16	–	Manos Manouselis, Kostas Petropoulos	Gary Trent, Miroslav Berić, Aleksandar Ćapin, Bariša Krasić, Éric Struelens, Rick Rickert, Georgios Maslarinos, Makis Dreliozis, Georgios Bozikas, Roundy Garcνa, Tassos Kantartzis, Christos Liggos, Ioannis Sakellariou, Alexis Tsamatos, Ilias Tsopis, Jitim Young, Ryan Robertson, Mikel Nahar, Jan-Hendrick Jagla, Vangelis Morfis, Dinos Tzialas
2005–06	5th place	Last 16	–	Argyris Pedoulakis	Damir Mulaomerović, Jamel Thomas, Dylan Page, Britton Johnsen, Robert Gulyas, Ruben Boumtje-Boumtje, Stevan Nađfeji, Dimitrios Tsaldaris, Tassos Kantartzis, Jovan Koprivica, Georgios Maslarinos, Vangelis Morfis, Kostas Paschalis, Ioannis Sakellariou, Ivan Tomas, Alexis Tsamatos, Ilias Tsopis, Juan Mendez, Christos Liggos, Alkiviadis Pappas
2006–07	5th place	Last 16	–	Vangelis Mageiras, Georgios Kalafatakis	Anthony Goldwire, Michalis Pelekanos, Nikos Oikonomou, Mamadou N'Diaye, Andrae Patterson, Malik Dixon, Nikos Argyropoulos, Dragan Ćeranić, Ioannis Georgallis, Sotirios Karapostolou, Stevan Nađfeji, Pantelis Papaioakeim, Alekos Petroulas, Damir Rančić, Ioannis Sakellariou, Gary Trent, Dubravko Zemljić, Agi Ibeja, Marko Jovanović, Panagiotis Spiliopoulos, Nikos Pappas
2007–08	6th place	Semifinalist	ULEB Cup; Regular Season	Ilias Zouros	Anthony Grundy, Jurica Golemac, Lewis Sims, Georgios Apostolidis, Nikos Argyropoulos, Mamadou N'Diaye, Đuro Ostojić, Damir Rančić, Vangelis Sklavos, Márton Báder, Milan Dozet, Dimitris Kalaitzidis, Vangelis Karampoulas, Tre Kelley, Pantelis Papaioakeim, Alekos Petroulas, Ioannis Sakellariou, Melvin Sanders, Nikos Pappas
2008–09	6th place	Last 8	EuroCup; Last 16	Ilias Zouros	Anthony Grundy, Jurica Golemac, Manos Papamakarios, Georgios Kalaitzis, Đuro Ostojić, Ivan Radenović, Vladimir Petrović-Stergiou, Nikos Makris, Dimitris Kalaitzidis, Ioannis Sakellariou, Alekos Petroulas, Brad Newley, Stevan Nađfeji, Dimitrios Kompodietas, Mustafa Shakur
2009–10	4th place	Last 8	EuroCup; Semifinals	Ilias Zouros	Ian Vougioukas, Đuro Ostojić, Efthymios Tsakaleris, Chris Owens, Josh Davis, Markos Kolokas, Devin Smith, Ioannis Georgallis, Alekos Petroulas, Manos Papamakarios, Kostas Charalampidis, Dimitrios Kompodietas, Roderick Blakney, Georgios Kalaitzis, Vassilis Xanthopoulos, Britton Johnsen
2010–11	12th place	Last 8	EuroCup; Last 16	Thanasis Skourtopoulos	Torin Francis, Đuro Ostojić, Efthymios Tsakaleris, Steven Smith, Vangelis Sklavos, Markos Kolokas, Joe Krabbenhoft, Georgios Kalaitzis, Ioannis Karathanasis, Manos Papamakarios, Samo Udrih, Dimitrios Kompodietas, Maurice Bailey, Vassilis Xanthopoulos, Andre Brown, Damir Rančić, Derrick Byars, Vlado Šćepanović

== Notable players ==
Note: Flags indicate national team eligibility at FIBA-sanctioned events. Players may hold other non-FIBA nationalities not displayed.

Criteria

To appear in this section a player must have either:

- Set a club record or won an individual award while at the club
- Played at least one official international match for their national team at any time
- Played at least one official NBA match at any time.

Greece

- (Greece) Georgios Apostolidis
- (Greece) Nikos Argyropoulos
- (Greece) Antonis Asimakopoulos
- (Greece) Kostas Charalampidis
- (Greece) Themis Cholevas
- (Greece) Antonis Christeas
- (Greece) Makis Dreliozis
- (Greece) Ioannis Georgallis
- (Greece) Andreas Glyniadakis
- (Greece) Vassilis Goumas
- (Greece) Dimitris Kalaitzidis
- (Greece) Georgios Kalaitzis
- (Greece) Sotiris Karapostolou
- (Greece) Ioannis Karathanasis
- (Greece) Kimon Kokorogiannis
- (Greece) Markos Kolokas
- (Greece) Dimitris Kompodietas
- (Greece) Georgios Limniatis
- (Greece) Albert Mallach
- (Greece) Panos Manias
- (Greece) Nikos Oikonomou
- (Greece) Missas Pantazopoulos
- (Greece) Dinos Papadimas
- (Greece) Pantelis Papaioakeim
- (Greece) Manos Papamakarios
- (Greece) Nikos Pappas
- (Greece) Michalis Pelekanos
- (Greece) Alekos Petroulas
- (Greece) Aristeidis Roubanis
- (Greece) Vangelis Sakellariou
- (Greece) Vangelis Sklavos
- (Greece) Mimis Stefanidis
- (Greece) Dimitris Tsaldaris
- (Greece) Paraskevas Tsantalis
- (Greece) Christos Tsekos
- (Greece) Ian Vougioukas
- (Greece) Vassilis Xanthopoulos
- (Greece) - (Russia) Anatoly Zourpenko

USA

- (United States) Mo Bailey
- (United States) Jeff Boschee
- (United States) Andre Brown
- (United States) Derrick Byars
- (United States) Josh Davis
- (United States) Anthony Goldwire
- (United States) Anthony Grundy
- (United States) Marcus Hatten
- (United States) Britton Johnsen
- (United States) Tre Kelley
- (United States) Joe Krabbenhoft
- (United States) Chris Owens
- (United States) Dylan Page
- (United States) Andrae Patterson
- (United States) Rick Rickert
- (United States) Ryan Robertson
- (United States) Melvin Sanders
- (United States) Mustafa Shakur
- (United States) Devin Smith
- (United States) Steven Smith
- (United States) Larry Stewart
- (United States) Jamel Thomas
- (United States) Gary Trent
- (United States) Jitim Young

Canada

- (Canada) Juan Mendez

Europe

- (Serbia) Miroslav Berić
- (Bulgaria) - (United States) Roderick Blakney
- (Slovenia) Aleksandar Ćapin
- (Slovenia) Jurica Golemac
- (Germany) Jan-Hendrik Jagla
- (Slovenia) Marijan Kraljević
- (Croatia) Damir Mulaomerović
- (Serbia) Stevan Nađfeji
- (Montenegro) Đuro Ostojić
- (Greece) - (Serbia) Vladimir Petrović-Stergiou
- (Serbia) Ivan Radenović
- (Croatia) Damir Rančić
- (Montenegro) Vlado Šćepanović
- (Slovenia) Samo Udrih

Africa

- (Cameroon) Ruben Boumtje-Boumtje
- (Senegal) Mamadou N'Diaye

Oceania

- (Australia) Brad Newley

== Head coaches ==
Head Coach	Years
(Greece) Nikos Nissiotis
(Greece) Michalis Kyritsis	1979–1981
(Greece) Christos Iordanidis	1981–1982
(Greece) Nikos Pavlou
(Greece) Manos Manouselis	1999–2005
(Greece) Kostas Flevarakis	2002–2003
(Greece) Kostas Diamantopoulos
(Greece) Kostas Petropoulos	2004–2005
(Greece) Argyris Pedoulakis	2005–2006
(Greece) Vangelis Mageiras	2006–2007
(Greece) Georgios Kalafatakis	2006–2007
(Greece) Ilias Zouros	2007–2010
(Greece) Thanasis Skourtopoulos	2010–2011
