= Makedonikos B.C. =

Makedonikos Neapolis B.C. Μακεδονικός Νεάπολης K.A.E.
- Leagues: Greek 3rd Division
- Founded: 1948
- History: 1948 – Present
- Arena: Makedonikos Indoor Hall
- Capacity: 600
- Location: Neapoli, Thessaloniki, Greece
- Team colors: Green, White
- President: Athanasios Angelopoulos
- Championships: Greek Second Division: (2) (2000, 2002)
- Website: makedonikos.gr
Home	Away

Makedonikos B.C., full name Makedonikos Neapolis B.C. (Greek: Μακεδονικός Νεάπολης K.A.E.) is a Greek professional basketball club. The club is located in Neapoli, Thessaloniki, Greece. The parent athletic club was founded in 1928, and the basketball department was founded in 1948. Makedonikos means "Macedonian" in Greek.

== History ==
Makedonikos won the Greek A2 League, which is the second-tier league in Greece, in the years 2000 and 2002. During the 2001–02 season, the team set the then A2 season record for most wins, with 24. Makedonikos was the runner-up of the EuroCup's 2004–05 season.

Since its foundation in 1948, Makedonikos' home city was Thessaloniki, Greece. Otherwise, when the team was bought by Dimitris Mesaikos, the franchise was moved to Kozani, Greece, in the mid-2000s, to play in a newer, larger arena that had just opened there. The team returned to Thessaloniki, Greece, after it had financial problems while playing in Kozani.

Makedonikos competed in the top-tier level Greek Basket League for several years, until going bankrupt in 2007, when it was relegated to the third-tier level Greek B League.

== Arenas ==
Makedonios plays its domestic home games at the 600 seat Makedonikos Indoor Hall, which is located in Thessaloniki, Greece. When the club was located in Kozani, Greece, they played their homes games at the 1,500 seat Ioannis Skarkalas Indoor Hall.

== Honours and titles ==
=== Domestic competitions ===
- Greek 2nd Division
  - Winners (2): 2000, 2002

=== International competitions ===
- EuroCup
  - Runners-up (1): 2005

== Notable players ==
Note: Flags indicate national team eligibility at FIBA-sanctioned events. Players may hold other non-FIBA nationalities not displayed.

Criteria

To appear in this section a player must have either:

- Set a club record or won an individual award while at the club
- Played at least one official international match for their national team at any time
- Played at least one official NBA match at any time.

Greece

- (Greece) Georgios Balogiannis
- (Greece) Nikos Boudouris
- (Greece) Kostas Charalampidis
- (Greece) Panagiotis Kafkis
- (Greece) Lefteris Kakiousis
- (Greece) Vangelis Karampoulas
- (Greece) Sotiris Karapostolou
- (Greece) Manthos Katsoulis
- (Greece) Markos Kolokas
- (Greece) Nestoras Kommatos
- (Greece) Panagiotis Liadelis
- (Greece) Pantelis Papaioakeim
- (Greece) Manos Papamakarios
- (Greece) Dimitris Papanikolaou
- (Greece) Alekos Petroulas
- (Greece) Georgios Sigalas
- (Greece) Dimitris Spanoulis

USA

- (United States) William Avery
- (United States) Walter Berry
- (United States) / (Republic of Ireland) Bryan Bracey
- (United States) Elton Brown
- (United States) Terrel Castle
- (United States) Joe Ira Clark
- (United States) Ben Davis
- (United States) Ben Handlogten
- (United States) Jason Hart
- (United States) Andre Hutson
- (United States) Dewayne Jefferson
- (United States) Pete Mickeal
- (United States) Scoonie Penn
- (United States) Rashad Phillips
- (United States) Dickey Simpkins
- (United States) Alvin Sims
- (United States) Charles Smith
- (United States) Major Wingate

Europe

- (Serbia) - (Greece) Dušan Jelić
- (Serbia) Dušan Kecman
- (Ukraine) Grigorij Khizhnyak
- (Serbia) Dragan Lukovski
- (Russia) Nikita Morgunov
- (Croatia) Slaven Rimac
- (Sweden) Bojan Stević

Oceania

- (Australia) Shane Heal

== Head coaches ==
- (Greece) Soulis Markopoulos
- (Israel) Zvi Sherf
- (Greece) Argyris Pedoulakis
- (Greece) Kostas Flevarakis
- (Greece) Antonis Baksevanis
