= Chalkiopoulio Sports Hall =

Sports arena in Lamia, Greece

- Interactive map of Chalkiopoulio Sports Hall
- Location: Lamia, Greece
- Coordinates: 38.89153°N 22.44608°E
- Owner: Municipality of Lamia
- Capacity: 5,000
- Surface: Parquet

Construction
- Opened: 1995

Tenants
- Panellinios B.C. Lamia (2010–2011)

The Chalkiopoulio Sports Hall or Lamia Arena (alternate spellings: Halkiopouleio, Halkiopoulio, Chalkiopouleio) is an indoor sporting arena that is located in the city of Lamia, Greece. The seating capacity of the arena is 5,000 people. The indoor arena is part of the Lamia Sports Center, which also features indoor and outdoor tennis courts, a football field, and outside basketball courts. The indoor arena is able to host basketball, volleyball, and handball matches and it is owned by the municipality of Lamia.

== History ==
The arena was built in 1995 and it is named after Miltiadis Chalkiopoulos. The arena hosted the Greek Basketball Cup Final Four in the years 1995 and 2004. It also hosted some group stage matches of the 1995 FIBA Under-19 World Championship, as well as the Greek Volleyball Cup Final Four in 1997.

It has also been used as the home arena of the Greek basketball teams Panellinios and Ionikos Lamias for domestic national league games. AEK Athens also used it to host Euroleague home games during the Euroleague 2002–03 season, while the large basketball arenas in Athens were unavailable, due to preparations for the 2004 Summer Olympics.
