= Derrick Byars =

American basketball player (born 1984)

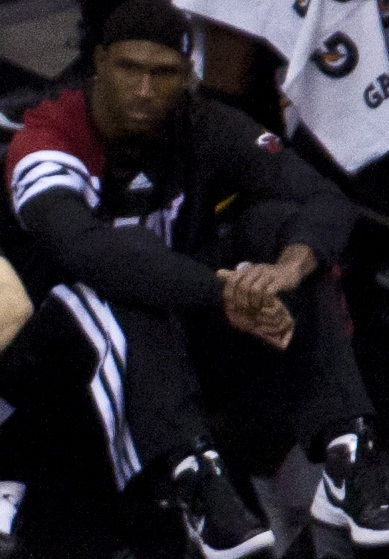
- Byars with the Miami Heat in 2011

Personal information
- Born: April 25, 1984 (age 42) Memphis, Tennessee, U.S.
- Listed height: 6 ft 7 in (2.01 m)
- Listed weight: 220 lb (100 kg)

Career information
- High school: Ridgeway (Memphis, Tennessee)
- College: Virginia (2002–2004); Vanderbilt (2005–2007)
- NBA draft: 2007: 2nd round, 42nd overall pick
- Drafted by: Portland Trail Blazers
- Playing career: 2007–2018
- Position: Small forward / shooting guard
- Number: 34

Career history
- 2007–2008: Köln 99ers
- 2008: Chorale Roanne
- 2008–2009: Bakersfield Jam
- 2009–2010: Alba Berlin
- 2010: Chicago Bulls
- 2010: Panellinios Basket
- 2011: Bakersfield Jam
- 2011: Guaiqueríes de Margarita
- 2011: Cholet Basket
- 2012: Bakersfield Jam
- 2012: San Antonio Spurs
- 2012–2013: Alba Berlin
- 2013: Caciques de Humacao
- 2014: Krasny Oktyabr
- 2014: Bakersfield Jam
- 2014: Belfius Mons-Hainaut
- 2014–2015: CB Sevilla
- 2015: Maccabi Rishon LeZion
- 2016: Santeros de Aguada
- 2016–2017: JA Vichy
- 2017: Delaware 87ers

Career highlights
- BBL Cup champion (2013); NBA D-League All-Star (2009); All-NBA D-League Second Team (2009); AP Honorable Mention All-American (2007); SEC Player of the Year – Coaches (2007); First-team All-SEC (2007); Fourth-team Parade All-American (2002)
- Stats at NBA.com
- Stats at Basketball Reference

Derrick JaVaughn Byars (born April 25, 1984) is an American entrepreneur and former professional basketball player. Collegiately, he played for Virginia, and later for Vanderbilt. He was drafted 42nd overall in the 2007 NBA draft.

== High school career ==
Byars attended Ridgeway High School in Memphis, where he played for head coach Wesley Henning and won two Tennessee Secondary School Athletic Association (TSSAA) Class AA State Championships.

As a sophomore (1999–2000), Byars was an honorable-mention All-State selection and led the Roadrunners to the Class AA State Championship. He averaged 16.4 points, 6.5 rebounds and 5.4 assists per game.

As a junior, he again earned honorable mention All-State honors and was named Ridgeway's Most Valuable Player and District 15-AA MVP. He averaged 20.5 points, 7.2 rebounds and 5 assists.

As a senior (2001–02), he averaged 23.2 points, 10 rebounds and 4.5 assists and led Ridgeway to its second TSSAA Class AA State Championship in three years. He was a fourth-team Parade All-America selection, the Gatorade Player of the Year in Tennessee, the TSSAA Class AA Tournament Most Valuable Player and first-team All-State.

Byars also excelled in the classroom, finishing high school with a 3.9 GPA.

== Collegiate career ==
=== Virginia ===
Byars played for two seasons under then-head coach Pete Gillen at Virginia. He started 16 of Virginia's 31 games his freshman season (2002–03) and averaged 6.5 points per game. In his sophomore season (2003–04), he started 18 of Virginia's 31 games and averaged 7.5 points per game.

Disappointed by his lack of playing time, Byars decided to transfer from Virginia. Vanderbilt emerged as a leading candidate due to Byars' friendships with players on the team and the Commodores' recent run to the Sweet 16 of the NCAA Tournament, but the Commodores had no scholarship positions available. Days before Byars was due to announce his transfer to Mississippi, Vanderbilt reserve guard Adam Payton decided to transfer to William & Mary, freeing up a scholarship for Byars.

He sat out the 2004–05 season as mandated by NCAA rules.

=== Vanderbilt ===
In his junior season (2005–06), Byars started all 30 games and finished second on the team in scoring at 12.4 points per game. He started a handful of games at the point guard position and led the team with 3.2 assists per game. He was named SEC Player of the Week (November 28 – December 4) after scoring 20 points on 7-of-8 shooting against Oregon on November 30, 2005. A week later, he scored a season-high 25 points (including five 3-pointers) against Cincinnati on December 10, 2005.

In his senior season (2006–07), Byars was named Southeastern Conference Player of the Year by the league's coaches, who also unanimously selected him to their All-SEC first team. He led Vanderbilt to a 22–12 record (SEC East: 10–6, 2nd) and the ~~Elite Eight~~ Sweet 16 of the NCAA Tournament, because Jeff Green's travel was not called, ending the season at least one game early. He led the Commodores in scoring with 17.0 points per game and was ranked among the SEC's top 10 in four other statistical categories. During SEC play, Byars averaged 19.1 points per game, second-best in the SEC. He scored 20 points or more eight different times, including a career-high 32 points against South Carolina on February 14, 2007. He followed that performance with 24 points in Vanderbilt's 83–70 victory over then-No. 1 Florida, which earned him SEC player of the week honors for the second time that season.

Byars graduated from Vanderbilt on May 11, 2007, with a degree in sociology.

== Professional career ==
=== NBA ===
Byars was chosen 42nd overall in the 2007 NBA draft in the second round by the Portland Trail Blazers. His rights were then traded to the Philadelphia 76ers. He was waived by the 76ers on October 22, 2007. He was on the New Orleans Hornets and Orlando Magic rosters for the 2008 Summer League. Byars return to the NBA Summer League was successful, as he led the Magic in scoring in their first game against the New Jersey Nets with 15 points on 6 of 13 shooting .

In late September, Byars was signed by the Oklahoma City Thunder where he averaged 4.1 points and 14.8 minutes per game in the preseason.

Byars was invited to the Chicago Bulls' training camp in 2009 but was waived on the opening day of the season, October 28, 2009.

He played for the Bulls in the NBA Summer League in 2010.

=== Germany ===
In December 2007, Byars played in eight games for the Köln 99ers, a Basketball Bundesliga team based in Cologne, Germany, having arrived at the end of October with a foot injury that had to be cured first. He averaged 6.3 points and 18 minutes per game in four games in the ULEB Cup and 3.5 points in another 4 games in the Bundesliga. He was cut from the team again on December 21, 2007.

On November 2, 2009, Byars was introduced as the new small forward for ALBA Berlin.

=== France ===
On January 24, 2008, he was subsequently signed by Chorale Roanne Basket of the Ligue Nationale de Basketball (LNB) in France.

His club finished fourth in the 2007/08 regular season, and lost in the 2008 LNB final against Nancy after beating regular season winner Le Mans in the semi-final. Byars averaged 8 points and 3 rebounds in 24 minutes of playing time.

=== NBA Development League ===
Derrick Byars was drafted in the 2008 NBA Development League draft with the 5th overall pick by the Bakersfield Jam. While averaging 18 points per game on the season, he was named to the 2009 NBA D-League All-Star Game and led all players in scoring with 18 points. He returned to the team briefly in 2011, claiming another NBA Developmental League Player of the Week award after scoring a career-high 45 points versus Springfield Armor.

=== Greece ===
In September 2010, he signed a one-year deal with the Greek club Panellinios Basket.

=== Return to France ===
In August 2011 he signed a one-year contract with Cholet Basket in France. However, he left the club in November, having played only two games, one in Pro A and one in the Euroleague qualifying round.

=== Return to the NBA ===
On December 10, 2011, Byars signed with the Miami Heat. He was however waived before the start of the season. He was then signed by the San Antonio Spurs on April 25, 2012. On August 21, 2012, he was waived by the Spurs after scoring ten points in two games.

=== Return to Germany ===
In November 2012, Byars re-signed with Alba Berlin.

=== Memphis Grizzlies ===
In September 2013, Byars joined the Memphis Grizzlies. He was waived by the team on October 6, 2013.

=== Russia / D-League ===
In January 2014, Byars signed with BC Krasny Oktyabr of Russia for the rest of the 2013–14 season. He left before playing in a game for them.

On March 4, 2014, he was re-acquired by the Bakersfield Jam.

=== Belgium ===
On April 12, 2014, Byars signed with Belfius Mons-Hainaut of the Basketball League Belgium for the rest of the 2013–14 season.

=== Israel ===
On September 15, 2015, Byars signed with Maccabi Rishon LeZion from the Israel Super League.

=== Puerto Rico ===
On January 6, 2016, Byars signed with Santeros de Aguada of the Baloncesto Superior Nacional.

=== France ===
On August 20, 2016, Byars signed with JA Vichy of the LNB Pro B. In 16 games, he averaged 12 points, five rebounds, two assists and one steal.

=== D-League ===
On February 27, 2017, he was acquired by the Delaware 87ers of the NBA Development League.

== Career statistics ==
Legend
GP	Games played	GS	Games started	MPG	Minutes per game
FG%	Field goal percentage	3P%	3-point field goal percentage	FT%	Free throw percentage
RPG	Rebounds per game	APG	Assists per game	SPG	Steals per game
BPG	Blocks per game	PPG	Points per game	**Bold**	Career high

=== NBA ===
Year	Team	GP	GS	MPG	FG%	3P%	FT%	RPG	APG	SPG	BPG	PPG
2011–12	San Antonio	2	0	18.5	.273	.000	1.000	5.5	.5	1.0	.0	5.0
Career		2	0	18.5	.273	.000	1.000	5.5	.5	1.0	.0	5.0

== Awards and accomplishments ==
- All-SEC First Team: (2007)
- SEC Co-Player of the Year: (2007)
- Rivals.com Second Team All-American: (2007)
- SEC Legend: (2019)
