= Maurice Bailey (basketball) =

American-Jamaican basketball player

Personal information
- Born: October 30, 1981 (age 45) Bronx, New York, U.S.
- Listed height: 6 ft 0 in (1.83 m)
- Listed weight: 190 lb (86 kg)

Career information
- High school: Southside (Rockville Centre, New York)
- College: Rider (1999–2000); Sacred Heart (2001–2004)
- NBA draft: 2004: undrafted
- Playing career: 2004–2012
- Position: Point guard

Career history
- 2004–2005: SLUC Nancy
- 2005: Etendard de Brest
- 2005–2006: SLUC Nancy
- 2006–2007: Lokomotiv Rostov
- 2007–2008: Union Olimpija
- 2008–2009: Spartak Primorje
- 2009: Crvena zvezda
- 2010: Xacobeo Obradoiro
- 2010–2011: Panellinios
- 2011: Trabzonspor
- 2012: VEF Rīga

Career highlights
- Slovenian League champion (2008); Slovenian Cup winner (2008); 2× Second-team All-NEC (2002, 2004)

Maurice Edward Bailey (born October 30, 1981) is an American-Jamaican former professional basketball player. He played the point guard position.

== High school and college career ==
Bailey who was Born in Bronx, New York, played his high school basketball at Southside High School in Rockville Centre, New York. He went on to play college basketball, first with Rider (1999-00), and then with Sacred Heart (2001–04).

== Professional career ==
Bailey began his professional career with the French League club SLUC Nancy in 2004, then he moved to the French club Etendard de Brest in 2005, before returning to SLUC Nancy later that same year. He then moved to the Russian League club Lokomotiv Rostov in 2006.

He joined the Adriatic League club Olimpija Ljubljana in 2007, after that, he joined the Russian club Spartak Primorje in 2008. He moved to the Adriatic League club Crvena zvezda in 2009, and he then moved on to the Spanish League club Xacobeo Obradoiro in 2010. Bailey then joined the Greek League club Panellinios. In 2011, he played for Trabzonspor, and in January 2012 he joined Latvian club VEF Rīga.
