= Samo Udrih =

Slovenian basketball player and coach

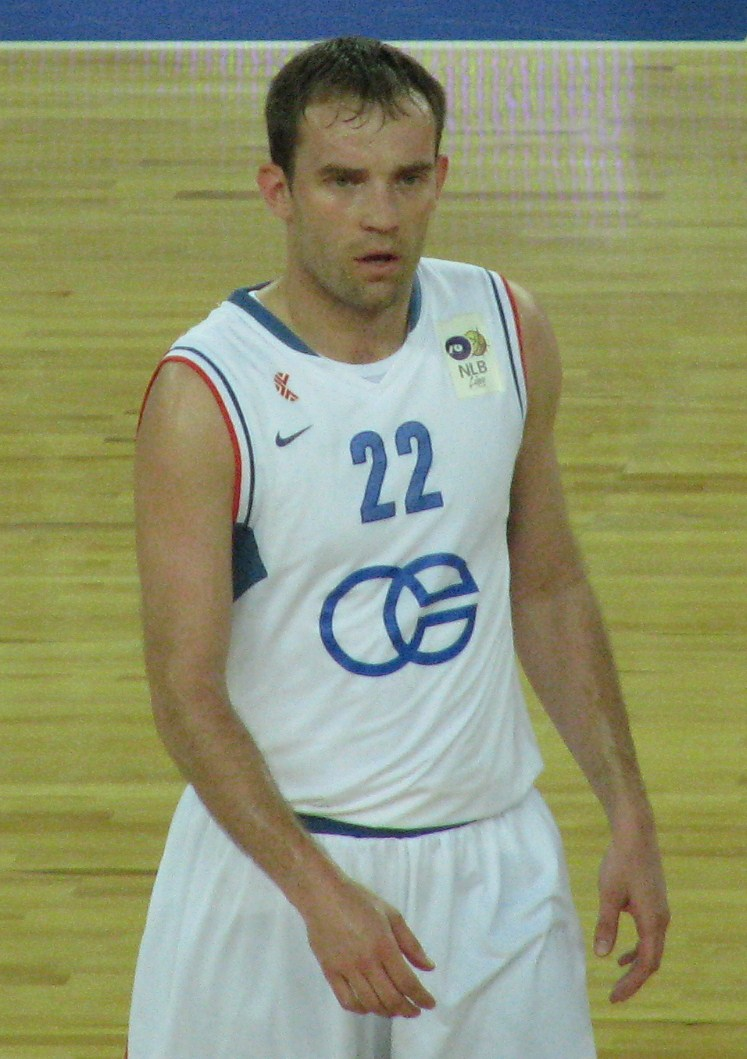
- Udrih with Cibona in 2010

Personal information
- Born: August 2, 1979 (age 47) Celje, SR Slovenia, SFR Yugoslavia
- Listed height: 6 ft 4.75 in (1.95 m)
- Listed weight: 205 lb (93 kg)

Career information
- NBA draft: 2001: undrafted
- Playing career: 1998–2017
- Position: Shooting guard

Career history

Playing
- 1998–2000: Hopsi Polzela
- 2000–2001: Zlatorog Laško
- 2001–2002: Slovan
- 2002–2003: Union Olimpija
- 2003–2004: Maurienne Savoie Basket
- 2004: Hopsi Polzela
- 2004–2005: Hapoel Tel Aviv
- 2005–2006: Akasvayu Girona
- 2006–2008: Granada
- 2008–2009: Estudiantes
- 2009–2010: Hopsi Polzela
- 2010: Cibona
- 2010–2011: Panellinios
- 2011: Union Olimpija
- 2011–2012: Valladolid
- 2012–2013: Zlatorog Laško
- 2013–2014: Hopsi Polzela
- 2014: Inter Bratislava
- 2014: Hopsi Polzela
- 2014–2015: Givova Scafati
- 2015–2016: Inter Bratislava
- 2016–2017: Celje

Coaching
- 2018–2019: KOŠ Primorska U19A & U17A
- 2018–2019: KOŠ Primorska
- 2020–2024: KK Vrani Vransko U16 & U18

Career highlights
- 4× Slovenian League All-Star (2001–2003, 2013); Slovenian Cup winner (2003); Croatian League champion (2010); Slovak Extraliga champion (2014)

Samo Udrih (born August 2, 1979) is a Slovenian former professional basketball player and basketball coach.

== Professional career ==
Udrih played with the Dallas Mavericks NBA Summer League team in 2005. In November 2010, he signed with Panellinios of the Greek League. On December 16, 2014, he signed with Italian team Givova Scafati. On February 1, 2015, he parted ways with Givova Scafati. On February 24, 2015, he signed with Inter Bratislava of the Slovak Extraliga.

== National team career ==
As a member of the senior men's Slovenian national basketball team, Udrih competed at the EuroBasket 2009, EuroBasket 2011 and at the 2010 FIBA World Championship.

== Personal ==
His father Silvo played for Zlatorog Laško, and his brother Beno Udrih, is a former professional basketball player who spent most of his career in the NBA.
