= Thanasis Skourtopoulos =

Greek basketball player and coach (1965–2026)

Personal information
- Born: 23 May 1965 Athens, Greece
- Died: 5 February 2026 (aged 60)
- Position: Head coach
- Coaching career: 1996–2026

Career history

Playing
- Dafni Dafniou
- Pagrati
- 1982–1991: AEK Athens

Coaching
- 1996–1998: Aigaleo
- 1998–1999: Dafni Dafniou
- 1999–2000: OFI
- 2000–2005: AEK Athens (Assistant)
- 2005–2006: Panellinios (Assistant)
- 2006–2008: Aigaleo
- 2009–2010: Peristeri
- 2010–2011: Panellinios
- 2011–2012: Ikaros Kallitheas
- 2012: Panionios
- 2013–2014: Keravnos
- 2014–2016: Rethymno
- 2014–2017: Greece (assistant)
- 2016–2017: Apollon Patras
- 2017–2018: Faros Larissas
- 2017–2021: Greece
- 2021: Iraklis Thessaloniki
- 2023: Astoria Bydgoszcz
- 2023–2024: Qatar
- 2025–2026: Khasin Khuleguud

Career highlights
- As assistant coach: Greek League champion (2002); Greek Cup winner (2001)

Athanasios "Thanasis" Skourtopoulos (alternate spelling: Thanassis) (Greek: Αθανάσιος "Θανάσης" Σκουρτόπουλος 23 May 1965 – 5 February 2026) was a Greek professional basketball player and coach.

== Club playing career ==
Skourtopoulos played professional basketball with the Greek clubs Dafni Dafniou, Pagrati, and AEK Athens. He was a member of the AEK Athens team that made it to the Greek Cup Finals, in 1988.

== Club coaching career ==
Some of the clubs of which Skourtopoulos was the head coach include: Aigaleo, Peristeri, Panellinios, Ikaros Kallitheas, Panionios, and Keravnos. In 2014, he became the head coach of Rethymno. In 2016, he became the head coach of Apollon Patras. In 2017, he became the head coach of GSL Faros.

On 1 July 2018, Skourtopoulos returned to Panionios. He later quit without coaching the team in any games.

On 4 February 2023, he signed with Astoria Bydgoszcz of the Polish Basketball League (PLK).

== National team coaching career ==
Skourtopoulos worked as an assistant coach of the senior men's Greek national basketball team at the following tournaments: the 2014 FIBA World Cup, the EuroBasket 2015, the 2016 Turin FIBA World Olympic Qualifying Tournament, and the EuroBasket 2017.

He became the head coach of Greece's senior men's national team in October 2017. He first coached Greece at the 2019 FIBA World Cup qualifiers. He also coached Greece at the actual 2019 FIBA World Cup. After the 2019 FIBA World Cup, the Hellenic Basketball Federation announced that Rick Pitino would be Greece's head coach at the 2020 FIBA Victoria Olympic Qualifying Tournament and the 2020 Summer Olympics, should Greece qualify, while Skourtopoulos would remain as Greece's head coach for the 2021 EuroBasket qualification tournament.

Skourtopoulos failed to lead the senior Greek national basketball team to the results at the 2019 FIBA World Cup, in China, that many analysts, and sports media had predicted. Some major US sports media criticized his use of the MVP of the 2018–19 NBA season, Giannis Antetokounmpo at the tournament.

In August 2023, he became the head coach of the Qatar national team.

== Personal life and death ==
Skourtopoulos died from a heart attack on 5 February 2026, at the age of 60.

== Awards and accomplishments ==
=== Assistant coach ===
- Greek Cup Winner: (2001)
- Greek League Champion: (2002)
