= Jaume Bassó =

Spanish basketball player (1929–2021)

Personal information
- Born: 19 September 1929 Badalona, Kingdom of Spain
- Died: 20 January 2021 (aged 91)
- Listed height: 1.80 m (5 ft 11 in)
- Position: Small forward

Career history
- ?–?: Club Joventut Badalona

Career highlights
- Copa del Rey de Baloncesto (1958); Winner of Mediterranean Games (1955)

Jaume Bassó Barberán (19 September 1929 – 20 January 2021) was a Spanish basketball player. He played for Spain from 1950 to 1955.
