= Manolis Papamakarios =

Greek basketball player (born 1980)

Manolis Papamakarios Μανώλης Παπαμακάριος
Personal information
- Born: 26 August 1980 (age 46) Athens, Greece
- Listed height: 6 ft 3.75 in (1.92 m)
- Listed weight: 235 lb (107 kg)

Career information
- Playing career: 1998–2018
- Position: Point guard / shooting guard

Career history
- 1998–2004: Peristeri
- 2004–2005: Makedonikos
- 2005–2008: Olympiacos
- 2008–2011: Panellinios
- 2011–2013: Gipuzkoa
- 2013–2014: Panelefsiniakos
- 2014: Fuenlabrada
- 2014–2015: KAOD
- 2015–2016: Faros Keratsiniou
- 2016–2017: Doukas
- 2017–2018: Gymnastikos Faros
Medals
Men's basketball
Representing Greece
FIBA Europe Under-18 Championship
Bronze medal – third place	1998 Bulgaria	Under-18

Emmanouil "Manolis" "Manos" Papamakarios (Greek: Εμμανουήλ "Μανώλης" "Μάνος" Παπαμακάριος; born 26 August 1980) is a retired Greek professional basketball player. He is 1.92 m (6 ft 3 3/4 in) tall and he mainly played as a shooting guard, but he could also play at the point guard, point forward, and small forward positions.

== Professional playing career ==
Born in Athens, Greece, Papamakarios began his professional basketball career with the Greek League club Peristeri in 1998. He then moved to Makedonikos in 2004, and then to Olympiacos Piraeus in 2005. After spending three seasons with Olympiacos Piraeus, he decided to leave the team in 2008, when he signed a two-year contract with Panellinios.

He then moved to the Spanish League club GBC. He joined the Greek club Panelefsiniakos in 2013. On 3 December 2014 he signed with Greek club KAOD.

In 2015, Papamakarios signed with the emerging powerhouse, Faros Keratsiniou, of the Greek A2 League.

In 2016, he signed with the Greek 2nd Division club Doukas. In 2017, he joined the Greek club Gymnastikos Faros Larissas.

On 12 July 2018, Papamakarios announced his official retirement from playing professional basketball in a letter, but in the same letter he also mentioned that he would remain close to the sport in another capacity. Later that same day, he became the sports director of Ifaistos Limnou.

== National team career ==
Papamakarios won the bronze medal at the 1998 FIBA Europe Under-18 Championship with Greece's junior national team. He also played at the 1999 FIBA Under-19 World Cup, and at the 2000 FIBA Europe Under-20 Championship. He was also a member of the senior men's Greek national basketball team.

== Post-playing career ==
After he retired from playing professional basketball, Papamakarios became the sports director of Ifaistos Limnou, in 2018.

== Awards and accomplishments ==
=== Player ===
- 1998 FIBA Europe Under-18 Championship: Bronze
- 2× Greek League All-Star: (2007, 2010)
