= Panellinios Indoor Hall =

Indoor sports hall in Athens, Greece

Coordinates: 37.9948°N 23.7348°E

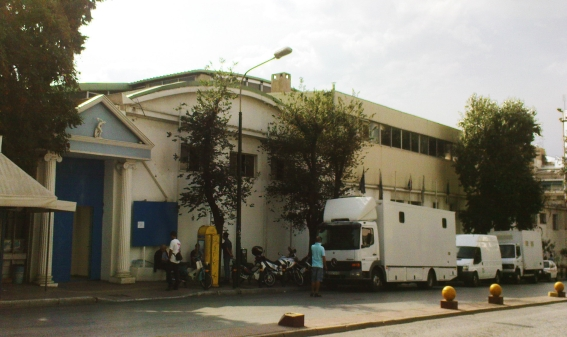
- Panellinios Indoor Hall's exterior
- Interactive map of Panellinios Indoor Hall
- Full name: Panellinios AC Indoor Hall
- Location: Kypseli, Athens, Greece
- Owner: Panellinios G.S.
- Capacity: Basketball: 1,100 (permanent tier seats); 1,800 (with temporary tier seats)
- Surface: Parquet
- Public transit: Victoria metro station

Construction
- Opened: 1976

Tenant
- Panellinios B.C.

Panellinios Indoor Hall, or Panellinios AC Indoor Hall, is a multi-purpose indoor sporting arena that is located in the district of Kypseli, Athens, Greece. The arena can host basketball, volleyball, and handball matches. The arena is small, with a permanent seating capacity 1,100, and a capacity of 1,800 spectators with temporary seating.

The arena has modern locker room facilities for the home and visiting teams, for the referees and the game judges, a complete press room, an anti-doping control room, club management offices, and a fully furnished press room for the media. The arena is owned by Panellinios G.S.

== History ==
The hall was constructed in 1976, by O.M.E.T.E. and Consulting Engineers of Greece. It has been the long-time home arena of the Panellinios B.C. basketball team, for Greek Basket League games. Since 2012, the arena hosts the home matches of Panathinaikos women's volleyball team, and since 2013, the home matches of the Panathinaikos men's volleyball team.
