= Ioannis Georgallis =

Greek professional basketball player

Dubai Basketball
- Title: Assistant coach
- League: ABA League; EuroLeague

Personal information
- Born: 17 May 1983 (age 43) Sydney, Australia
- Listed height: 6 ft 6.75 in (2.00 m)
- Listed weight: 230 lb (104 kg)

Career information
- Playing career: 2000–2019
- Position: Shooting guard / small forward
- Coaching career: 2020–present

Career history

Playing
- 2000–2006: Apollon Patras
- 2006–2007: Panellinios
- 2007–2009: Panionios
- 2009–2010: Panellinios
- 2010–2014: Kolossos Rodou
- 2014–2015: Apollon Patras
- 2015–2019: Kolossos Rodou

Coaching
- 2020–2024: Kolossos Rodou (assistant)
- 2024–present: Dubai Basketball (assistant)
Medals
Men's basketball
Representing Greece
Mediterranean Games
Silver medal – second place	2005 Almería	Under-26
FIBA Europe Under-20 Championship
Gold medal – first place	2002 Lithuania	Under-20
FIBA Europe Under-16 Championship
Silver medal – second place	1999 Slovenia	Under-16

Ioannis Georgallis (alternate spellings: Giannis, Georgalis) (born 17 May 1983) is a Greek former professional basketball player, who finished his club playing career as the team captain of Kolossos Rodou of the Greek Basket League and a current basketball coach. At a height of 2.00 m (6 ft 6 3/4 in) tall, and a weight 104 kg (230 lbs), he mainly played at the small forward position.

== Professional career ==
Georgallis began his professional career in 2000, with the Greek club Apollon Patras. Formerly he was playing for youth teams of Ialysos and Kolossos. In 2006, he moved to the Greek club Panellinios, and the next year, he joined the Greek club Panionios. In 2009, he returned to Panellinios. In October 2010, he signed a three-year contract with the Greek club Kolossos Rodou. He returned to Apollon Patras in 2014. He went back to Kolossos Rodou in 2015, where he eventually became the team captain, and he played with the team for four more seasons. Georgallis announced his retirement from the sport on 17 August 2019.

== National team career ==
Georgallis won the silver medal at the 1999 FIBA Europe Under-16 Championship, and the gold medal at the 2002 FIBA Europe Under-20 Championship, as a member of the Greek junior national basketball teams. He also won the silver medal at the 2005 Mediterranean Games, while playing with Greece's under-26 national selection.

== Awards and accomplishments ==
- 1999 FIBA Europe Under-16 Championship: Silver
- 2002 FIBA Europe Under-20 Championship: Gold
- 2005 Mediterranean Games: Silver
