= Vangelis Sklavos =

Greek basketball player (born 1977)

Vangelis Sklavos Βαγγέλης Σκλάβος
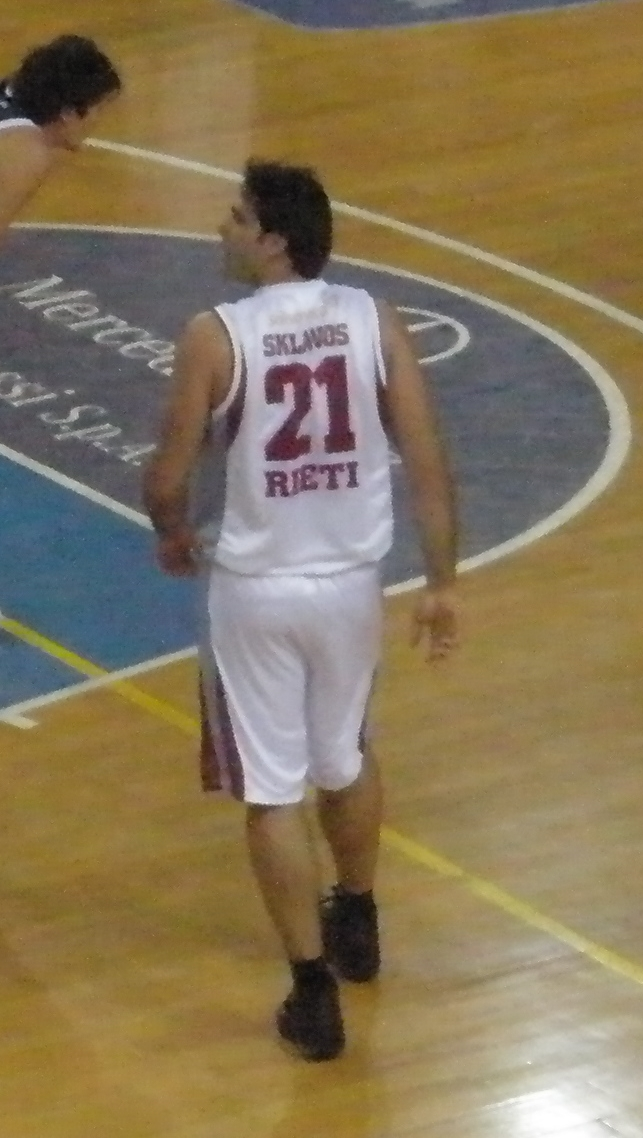
- Sklavos, while a member of NSB Rieti, in 2009.

Personal information
- Born: 1 December 1977 (age 48) Athens, Greece
- Listed height: 6 ft 7.5 in (2.02 m)
- Listed weight: 235 lb (107 kg)

Career information
- Playing career: 1997–2017
- Position: Small forward / power forward

Career history
- 1997–2000: Milon
- 2000: Irakleio Crete
- 2000–2003: Panionios
- 2003–2005: Olympiacos
- 2005–2006: Valencia
- 2006–2007: Lokomotiv Rostov
- 2007–2008: Panellinios
- 2008–2009: NSB Rieti
- 2009–2010: Vanoli Cremona
- 2010–2011: Panellinios
- 2011–2012: AEK Athens
- 2012–2013: Pagrati
- 2013–2015: Doxa Lefkadas
- 2015–2016: Koropi
- 2016–2017: Keravnos Aigio

Evangelos "Vangelis" Sklavos (alternate spelling: Vaggelis) (Greek: Ευάγγελος "Βαγγέλης" Σκλάβος; born 1 December 1977) is a former Greek professional basketball player. He was born in Athens, Greece. At a height of 2.02 m (6'7 1/2"), he played in the small forward and power forward positions.

== Professional career ==
Some of the clubs that Sklavos played with during his professional career are Panionios, Olympiacos, Valencia, Lokomotiv Rostov, NSB Rieti, and Vanoli Cremona. In 2010, he signed with Panellinios. He moved to AEK Athens in 2011, and then to Pagrati in 2012. Subsequently, in 2013, he joined Doxa Lefkadas.
