= 1991 FIBA Centennial Jubilee =

Tournament details
- Arena: SEF; Piraeus, Greece
- Dates: June 5–9

Final positions
- Champions: Italy
- Runners-up: Greece

The 1991 FIBA Centennial Jubilee was the special edition tournament of the Acropolis International Basketball Tournament that was organized jointly by FIBA Europe and the Hellenic Basketball Federation to commemorate the 100th anniversary, or Centennial, of the creation of the sport of basketball, in 1891, by James Naismith. The tournament was held from June 5 to June 9, 1991, at the SEF Indoor Hall in Piraeus, Greece. The tournament was won by the Italian national team, with the Greek national team finishing in second place.

The Centennial Jubilee also included a FIBA Europe All-Star Game, which was divided up into a Balkans versus the rest of Europe format. The FIBA Balkans Selection Team, won the all-star game, over the FIBA European Selection Team, which took place on 8 June 1991, by a score of 103–102. The tournament is not counted officially with the other 29 Acropolis International Tournaments, because it was not solely organized by the Hellenic Basketball Federation.

== Participating teams ==
- France
- Greece
- Italy
- Soviet Union
- Spain
- Yugoslavia

== Standings ==
Champions FIBA Centennial Jubilee

Team	Pld	W	L	PF	PA	PD	Pts
Italy	3	3	0	289	246	+43	6
Greece	3	2	1	261	267	−6	5
Yugoslavia	1	0	1	83	85	−2	1
Soviet Union	1	0	1	85	93	−8	1
France	1	0	1	80	90	−10	1
Spain	1	0	1	85	102	−17	1

== Results ==
June 5, 1991

Italy	102–85	Spain

Peace and Friendship Stadium, Piraeus, Attica, Greece

June 5, 1991

Greece	90–80	France

Peace and Friendship Stadium, Piraeus, Attica, Greece

June 7, 1991

Yugoslavia	83–85	Italy

Peace and Friendship Stadium, Piraeus, Attica, Greece

June 7, 1991

Greece	93–85	Soviet Union

Peace and Friendship Stadium, Piraeus, Attica, Greece

June 8, 1991

The Balkans Selection	103–102	FIBA European Selection

Peace and Friendship Stadium, Piraeus, Attica, Greece

June 9, 1991

Greece	78–102	Italy

Peace and Friendship Stadium, Piraeus, Attica, Greece

== Final standings ==
Rank	Team
1st place, gold medalist(s)	Italy
2nd place, silver medalist(s)	Greece
3	Yugoslavia
3	Soviet Union
3	France
3	Spain

1991 FIBA Centennial Jubilee winners

Italy

Most Valuable Player
Not awarded

== Balkans versus Rest of Europe Game ==
In the FIBA Europe All-Star Game, the FIBA Balkans Selection took on a FIBA European Selection from the rest of Europe. The FIBA Balkans Selection won the all-star game, by a score of 103–102. Nikos Galis, of The FIBA Balkans Selection Team, was the game's top scorer, with 22 points, while Jure Zdovc hit the game's winning shot. It was FIBA European Selection's 25th game in its history.

"The FIBA European Selection" team consisted of:

- (Soviet Union) **Sergei Bazarevich (#5)**
- (France) **Stéphane Ostrowski (#9)**
- (Soviet Union) **Andrejs Bondarenko (#11)**
- (Italy) **Antonello Riva (#12)**
- (Spain) **Epi (#15)**
- (Spain) Jordi Villacampa (#8)
- (Spain) Antonio Martín (#14)
- (Italy) Walter Magnifico (#6)
- (Italy) Roberto Brunamonti (#4)
- (France) Richard Dacoury (#7)
- (France) Philippe Szanyiel (#13)
- (Soviet Union) Igors Miglinieks (#10)
- (Italy) Head Coach: Sandro Gamba

"The FIBA Balkans Selection" team consisted of:

- (Greece) **Nikos Galis (#4)**
- (Greece) **Panagiotis Giannakis (#6)**
- (Socialist Federal Republic of Yugoslavia) **Toni Kukoč (#7)**
- (Socialist Federal Republic of Yugoslavia) **Žarko Paspalj (#8)**
- (Socialist Federal Republic of Yugoslavia) **Dino Rađja (#14)**
- (Socialist Federal Republic of Yugoslavia) Jure Zdovc (#9)
- (Socialist Federal Republic of Yugoslavia) Zoran Savić (#12)
- (Greece) Panagiotis Fasoulas (#13)
- (Greece) Fanis Christodoulou (#15)
- (Bulgaria) Georgi Glouchkov (#10)
- (Bulgaria) Hüsnü Çakırgil (#5)
- (Romania) Sorin Ardelean (#11)
- (Greece) Head Coach: Kostas Politis
- Bold: Starting five players

== Score sheet ==
SCORE SHEET:
EVENT: FIBA Centennial Game
DATE: June 8, 1991
ATTENDANCE:: 17,000
VENUE: SEF, Piraeus, Athens, Greece
SCORE: Europe - Balkans 102–103

Europe: Epi 11, Jordi Villacampa 17, Antonio Martín 13, Antonello Riva, Walter Magnifico, Roberto Brunamonti, Richard Dacoury, Stéphane Ostrowski 8, Philip Szanyiel, Sergei Bazarevich 9, Igors Miglinieks, Andrejs Bondarenko

Balkans: Toni Kukoč 14, Dino Rađja, Žarko Paspalj 15, Jure Zdovc 17, Zoran Savić, Nikos Galis 22, Panagiotis Giannakis 10, Panagiotis Fasoulas 12, Fanis Christodoulou, Georgi Glouchkov 0, Hüsnü Çakırgil, Sorin Ardelean 0

== See also ==
- FIBA's 50 Greatest Players (1991)
- FIBA Europe All-Star Game
