= Nikos Galis =

Greek-American basketball player (born 1957)

Nikos Galis Νίκος Γκάλης
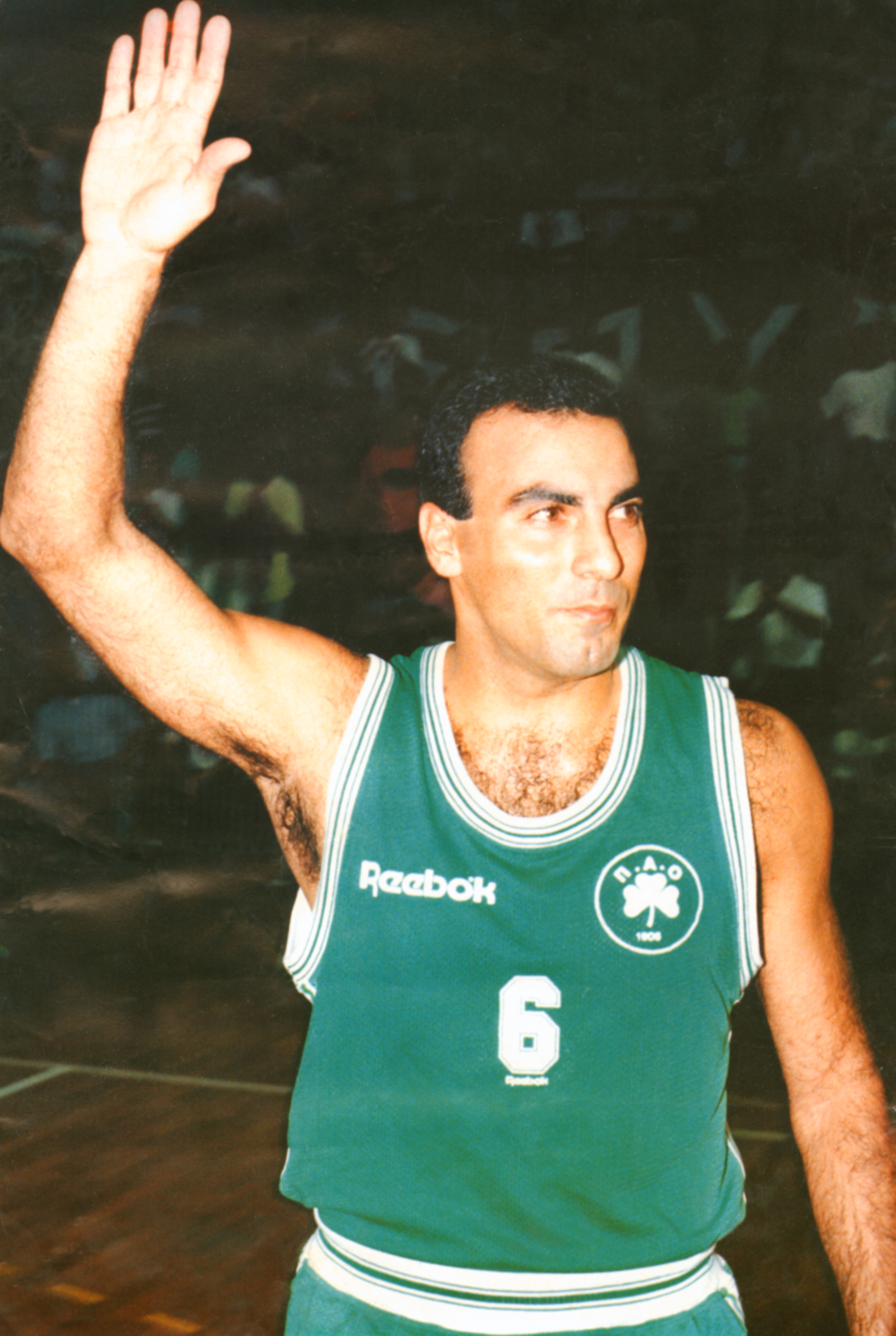
- Galis with Panathinaikos in 1992

Personal information
- Born: July 23, 1957 (age 69) Union City, New Jersey, U.S.
- Listed height: 6 ft 0 in (1.83 m)
- Listed weight: 198 lb (90 kg)

Career information
- High school: Union Hill (Union City, New Jersey)
- College: Seton Hall (1975–1979)
- NBA draft: 1979: 4th round, 68th overall pick
- Drafted by: Boston Celtics
- Playing career: 1979–1994
- Position: Shooting guard
- Number: 6, 4, 7

Career history
- 1979–1992: Aris
- 1992–1994: Panathinaikos

Career highlights
- FIBA EuroBasket MVP (1987); 4× FIBA EuroBasket Top Scorer (1983, 1987, 1989, 1991); Euroscar Award (1987); Mr. Europa Award (1987); Mediterranean Player of the Year (1987); 5× EuroLeague Top Scorer (1988–1990, 1992, 1994); 2× FIBA European Selection (1987, 1991 I); EuroLeague assists leader (1994); 101 Greats of European Basketball (2018); 8× Greek League champion (1983, 1985–1991); 7× Greek Cup winner (1985, 1987–1990, 1992, 1993); Greek Super Cup winner (1986); 5× Greek League MVP (1988–1992); 4× Greek League Finals MVP (1988–1991); 11× Greek League Top Scorer (1981–1991); 4× Greek League assists leader (1991–1994); 2× Greek All-Star (1991, 1994 I); 5× Greek Cup Finals Top Scorer (1987, 1989, 1990, 1992, 1993); Greek Super Cup Finals Top Scorer (1986); Greek League Hall of Fame (2022); 3× Greek Athlete of the Year (1986, 1987, 1989); FIBA's 50 Greatest Players (1991); 50 Greatest EuroLeague Contributors (2008); No. 6 retired by Aris (2013); No. 4 retired by Greece national team (2023); ECAC Player of the Year (1979); Haggerty Award (1979)
- Stats at Basketball Reference
- Basketball Hall of Fame
- FIBA Hall of Fame
Medals
Event	1st	2nd	3rd
FIBA EuroBasket	1	1	0
Balkan Championship	1	0	1
Total	2	1	1
Men's basketball
Representing Greece
FIBA EuroBasket
Gold medal – first place	1987 Greece	
Silver medal – second place	1989 Yugoslavia	
Balkan Championship
Gold medal – first place	1986 Bulgaria	
Bronze medal – third place	1984 Greece	

Nikolaos Georgalis (Greek: Νικόλαος Γεωργαλής; born July 23, 1957), commonly known as either Nikos Galis (Greek: Νίκος Γκάλης) or Nick Galis, is an American-born Greek former professional basketball player. Galis, who during his playing days was nicknamed "Nick The Greek", "The Gangster", and "The Iron Man", is widely regarded as Europe 's greatest scorer to ever play the game, and as one of the all-time greatest players in FIBA international basketball history. In 1991, Galis was named one of FIBA's 50 Greatest Players. In 2007, he became an inaugural member of the FIBA Hall of Fame. In 2008, he was chosen as one of the 50 Greatest EuroLeague Contributors. In 2017, he was inducted into the Naismith Memorial Basketball Hall of Fame. In 2018, he was named one of the 101 Greats of European Basketball. In 2022, he was inducted in to the Greek Basket League Hall of Fame.

During his college basketball career at Seton Hall University, Galis played at the point guard position. However, his primary position during his pro career was shooting guard. He spent most of his club career with Aris Thessaloniki, before having a late career stint with Panathinaikos Athens. Galis was the EuroLeague's top scorer of the season numerous times. In Europe's premier basketball club competition, he reached the EuroLeague Final Four on four occasions, making it in three consecutive years with Aris (1988, 1989, 1990), and once with Panathinaikos (1994). Galis won eight Greek league championships, and he is also the Greek Championship's amateur era all-time leading scorer, in both career points scored and career scoring average, when counting all league formats prior to the league becoming fully professional, in the 1992–93 season.

Galis led the Greece men's national basketball team to the EuroBasket's gold medal in 1987, and he earned the tournament's MVP award in the process. Following his stunning success in winning the 1987 EuroBasket title, Galis won both the Mr. Europa and the Euroscar player of the year awards. He also led Greece to a silver medal at the 1989 EuroBasket, where he was also selected to the All-EuroBasket Team. Overall during his national team career, he was named to the All-EuroBasket Team four times (1983, 1987, 1989, 1991). Among his myriad of accomplishments, he holds the EuroBasket's record for the highest career scoring average (31.2 points per game), and he was also the leading scorer of four EuroBasket tournaments, in 1983, 1987, 1989, and 1991. Galis also owns two major records of the FIBA World Championship/Cup tournament. He holds the records for the highest career scoring average (33.5 points per game), and the most total points ever scored in a single tournament, which he set at the 1986 FIBA World Championship.

Galis, who was named the Greek Male Athlete of the Year three times (1986, 1987, 1989), is considered by many to be one of the greatest national athletes Greece has had. He is still widely lauded in Greece and has kept his position as a legend and a hero for the Greek nation and people. Galis' number 6 jersey was retired by Aris, in 2013, and his number 4 jersey was retired by the Greece national team, in 2023.

In 2013 the Main Hall of Thessaloniki's "Alexandreion Melathron" (aka Palais des Sport of Thessaloniki) was named "Nick Galis Hall".

In 2016 the "Olympic Indoor Sports Center in O.A.C.A." was renamed after his name. Thus becoming "Nikos Galis Olympic Indoor Sports Center in O.A.C.A.".

== Early life ==
Galis was born in Union City, New Jersey. The child of a poor immigrant family, from the Greek islands of Rhodes and Nisyros, Galis took up boxing in his early years, after his father, George Georgalis, who had also been a boxer in his youth. He was later persuaded to give up boxing by his mother, Stella Georgalis, who was terrified after each time that her son would return home from boxing training with a new facial injury. As a result, Galis started playing the sport of basketball instead of boxing. He attended Union Hill High School, in Union City, where he played high school basketball for legendary coach William J. McKeever, as well as American football.

== College career ==
After high school, Galis enrolled at Seton Hall University, where he played college basketball as a member of the Seton Hall Pirates. In his senior 1978–79 season, Galis saw his scoring average reach 27.5 points per game, which was third in the nation, behind Idaho State's Lawrence Butler (30.1 points per game) and Indiana State's Larry Bird (28.6 points per game), including a 48-point outburst against Santa Clara University.

Also in his senior year of college, Galis won the Haggerty Award (the New York City metro area's best player award), and the Eastern College Athletic Conference Player of the Year award. The same year, he also played in the 1979 Pizza Hut All-American game, alongside Bird and Vinnie Johnson. During his four-year college career, Galis played in a total of 107 games and scored 1,651 points, for a career scoring average of 15.4 points per game.

Galis' head coach at Seton Hall, Bill Raftery, would later state that Galis was the best player that he ever coached. While at Seton Hall, Galis was a good friend and roommate of Italian-American professional basketball player Dan Callandrillo. Galis was later inducted into the Seton Hall Athletic Hall of Fame, in 1991.

=== College stats ===
Season	Team	Competition	Games Played	Field Goal%	Free Throw%	Rebounds	Assists	Points
1975–76	Seton Hall	NCAA D-I	24	47.5	70.4	1.1	1.8	3.2
1976–77	Seton Hall	NCAA D-I	29	38.1	81.9	2.3	4.8	12.6
1977–78	Seton Hall	NCAA D-I	27	52.1	82.6	2.4	4.5	17.3
1978–79	Seton Hall	NCAA D-I	27	57.6	82.6	3.5	3.9	27.5
Career Totals	Seton Hall	NCAA D-I	107	50.0	81.7	2.4	3.8	15.4

== Professional career ==
=== Boston Celtics ===
After finishing his collegiate career in 1979, Galis signed with agent Bill Manon, who also managed Diana Ross. Manon did not have Galis work out with any NBA team. Galis was eventually selected by the Boston Celtics in the 4th round of the 1979 NBA draft, 68th overall. Due to a severe ankle injury that Galis suffered during the Celtics preseason training camp of the 1979–80 season, the franchise was no longer interested in offering him a contract because Gerald Henderson had taken his place on the team, and his injury would keep him out for the foreseeable future.

Galis then decided to pursue a professional career in Greece's top-tier level Basket League. Later, while still playing in Greece, he would be offered NBA contracts by the Celtics and the New Jersey Nets. However, he turned the offers down, because at the time, and until 1989, FIBA did not have professional status, and consequently did not allow NBA players to compete at the national team level. Since playing with the Greek men's national basketball team meant so much to him, he stayed in Greece. Celtics then-president Red Auerbach later said that the single biggest mistake he ever made in his career was not keeping Galis.

=== Aris Thessaloniki ===
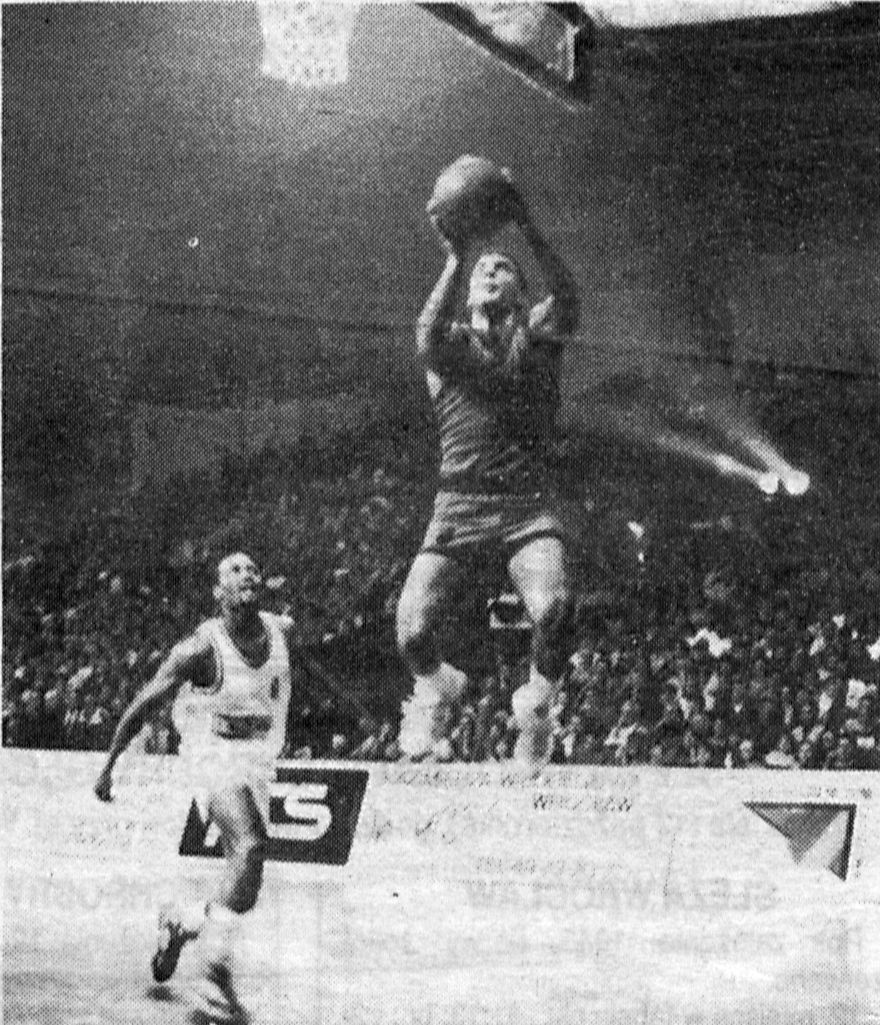
Galis (on the right), and Keith Williams (on the left), during a game of the FIBA EuroLeague's 1991–92 season.

After suffering an ankle injury in the Boston Celtics 1979–80 preseason training camp, which prevented him from receiving a contract with the Celtics, Galis made the move across the Atlantic, and signed to play with Aris Thessaloniki of Greece, in 1979. The two major Greek clubs of Panathinaikos Athens and Olympiacos Piraeus, had also shown some interest in signing him, but it was Aris Thessaloniki's interest that was the most persuasive to Galis. His move to the country would eventually help Greek club basketball to reach a level of popularity that had never been previously imagined.

Galis was the indisputable leader of Aris Thessaloniki, as he averaged more than 30 points per game in nearly every season and competition that he played in with the team. With Aris Thessaloniki, he played alongside other great European players like Panagiotis Giannakis and Slobodan Subotić, who was known in Greece as Lefteris Soumpotits. With Aris Thessaloniki, Galis won eight Greek League championships, in the years 1983, 1985, 1986, 1987, 1988, 1989, 1990, and 1991. He won seven out of his eight Greek League championships in consecutive years, with three of those championships being won in undefeated seasons. He also won six Greek Cup titles with Aris Thessaloniki, in the years 1985, 1987, 1988, 1989, 1990, and 1992. Four of his six Greek Cup titles were won in consecutive years.

In the top-level European-wide club competition, the FIBA European Champions' Cup (EuroLeague), Galis led Aris Thessaloniki to three consecutive appearances at the competition's Final Four. Galis' team played at the 1988 Ghent Final Four, the 1989 Munich Final Four, and the 1990 Zaragoza Final Four. All three of Galis' FIBA European Champions' Cup Final Four appearances ended in losses in the semifinals, which thus deprived him of the opportunity to shine all the way onto Europe's biggest club stage, at the FIBA European Champions' Cup Finals (EuroLeague Finals). However, the team's performances and general standard of play, which led to cinemas and theaters in Greece to reduce their ticket admission prices on Thursday evenings, including when Aris Thessaloniki was playing European games, as large segments of the country settled down to watch them on television.

In June 1991, Galis was chosen as a member of The Balkans Selection All-Star Team that played against The European Selection All-Star Team at the 1991 FIBA Centennial Jubilee. The 1991 FIBA Jubilee event was held in order to commemorate the 100th anniversary of the creation of the sport of basketball in 1891, by the Canadian James Naismith. The FIBA Jubilee All-Star Game took place at the Peace and Friendship Stadium, in Piraeus, Athens, Greece, and it included numerous legends of European basketball. The Balkans' All-Star Selection won the game, by a score of 103–102. Galis was the game's top scorer, with 20 points.

On 19 December 1991, in one of his final FIBA EuroLeague games with Aris Thessaloniki, Galis rolled back the clock. At the age of 34, he scored 46 points, on 13/20 field goals overall, 8/14 2-point field goals, 5/6 3-point field goals, and 15/18 free throws, in a 111–108 loss against the Italian League club Olimpia Milano. However, Aris Thessaloniki's 1991–92 FIBA EuroLeague season was a disappointment, as the club finished group stage play with a record of 3–11.

Also in that same 1991–92 season, in a Greek League game against Panionios Athens, Galis scored 48 points, on 17/21 field goals overall, 15/18 2-point field goals, 2/3 3-point field goals, and 12/13 free throws. However, Aris Thessaloniki failed to make it to the 1992 Greek League's Finals. It was the first time that the team had not won the Greek League championship, since 1984.

Eventually, the 1991–92 season ended up being Galis' final campaign with Aris Thessaloniki. At the time, the team was under new management and was trying to bring down the club's debts. That combined with Galis' huge salary at the time and the fact that the team was in a period of decline, were the main reasons for his departure. Galis, who adored the city of Thessaloniki and Aris' fans, had originally insisted on remaining with the club and playing for the team, as he believed that he still had a lot to offer. Ultimately however, Galis was forced to leave the club. In his last game for the club, Galis scored 18 points (6/9, 6/9, 0/2) as Aris beat AEK 74–62 to win yet another Greek Cup title in 1992.

=== Panathinaikos Athens ===
Galis moved to Athens, in the summer of 1992, to play with Panathinaikos. He was the player who then led the "Greens" to a club rebirth, after it had suffered through a long drought period, during which the historical team had remained without winning any titles. The previous season (1991–92) had been particularly disappointing for the club, with the team finishing in eighth place in the Greek league. As the team's captain, Galis inspired the young players of Panathinaikos Athens, such as Fragiskos Alvertis and Nikos Oikonomou, and he gradually brought back hope to the team's fans. So much so, as to the point that the club's then home arena, Glyfada Indoor Hall, was always overcrowded. In that season (1992–93), Panathinaikos Athens finished in second place in the Greek league, and also won the Greek Cup title, which was the seventh Greek Cup title for Galis.

In the following 1993–94 season, Galis was the FIBA European League (EuroLeague)'s Top Scorer, with an average of 23.8 points per game, in 21 games played. He also led the league in assists, with an average of 4.7 assists per game. In Panathinaikos Athens' decisive Game 3 victory of the FIBA European League's quarterfinals, against the then reigning league champions, the French League club Limoges, Galis truly led Panathinaikos Athens into a new club era. Galis led Panathinaikos Athens' qualification to the 1994 Tel Aviv FIBA European League Final Four, by scoring 30 points in the deciding playoff game, on 12–16 (75%) field goal shooting in the game. The "Greens" eventually finished in third place in the FIBA European League that season, after they lost in the semifinals to their arch-rivals Olympiacos Piraeus, by a score of 77–72.

However, it was still the furthest that the club had reached in the competition since the 1971–72 season. Galis scored 30 points in Panathinaikos Athens' win in the Final Four's third place game against the Spanish League club FC Barcelona, as he led all scorers in the game, with 30 points. Galis was named to the All-Final Four Team.

In what proved to be one of his final games for Panathinaikos, during the 3rd/4th place playoff series against Panionios in May 1994, Galis went scoreless in a game for the first time in his professional career in Greece, ending game 2 (which Panathinaikos lost 93–71) with 0/4 two-point shots from 29 minutes' play. Galis rallied to score 18 and 22 points in games 3 and 4, both of which Panathinaikos won to seal 3rd spot and a place in the FIBA European League for the following season.

In his third season with Panthinaikos Athens (1994–95), Galis teamed up with Panagiotis Giannakis and Žarko Paspalj, to make a strong effort to win the championship of the FIBA European League. Galis was the player who led Panathinaikos Athens to the competition's Top 16 group stage, as he prevented their elimination from the competition against the Ukrainian Super League club Budivelnyk Kyiv, with a game-high of 23 points in the club's decisive second-leg game victory. Galis was also the leader of the team in their Greek Cup win against Olympiacos Piraeus, at the Sporting Sports Arena.

At the age of 37, Galis played in his last game in professional basketball, as a player of Panathinaikos Athens, on October 12, 1994. It was in a game against Dafni Athens, in Week 1 of the Greek League's 1994–95 season. In that game, Galis scored a total of 8 points (2/2, 3/3), in 35 minutes of playing time. Panathinaikos Athens won the game in a blowout, by a score of 82–60.

Galis' playing career then ended controversially, on October 18, 1994, before Panathinaikos Athens' Week 2 game of the Greek League's 1994–95 season. Kostas Politis, who was the head coach of Panathinaikos Athens at the time, decided not to include Galis in the team's starting line-up of that Greek League game versus Ampelokipoi Athens. In protest against the head coach's decision, Galis left the arena, and ultimately, he never returned to playing action again. His retirement was officially announced in the media, on September 29, 1995.

During his pro club basketball career, Galis scored a total of 12,864 points, in 384 Greek Basket League games played, for a career scoring average of 33.5 points per game. In the 55 career Greek Cup games in which he played, he scored a total of 1,935 points, for a career scoring average of 35.2 points per game. He also averaged 42.5 points per game, in the two Greek Super Cup games that he played in. He scored a total of 864 points, in 23 FIBA Korać Cup games, for a career scoring average of 37.6 points per game. In the FIBA EuroLeague, he scored a total of 4,047 points, in 125 games played, for a career scoring average of 32.4 points per game. Overall, in all of the pro club competitions that he played in, Galis scored a total of 19,795 points, in 589 games played, for a pro club career scoring average of 33.6 points per game.

=== Career pro club statistics ===
Competition (Level)	Games Played	Points Scored	Scoring Average	Ref.
Greek League (regular season & postseason)	384	12,864	33.5	
Greek Cup	55	1,935	35.2	
Greek Super Cup	2	85	42.5	
FIBA Korać Cup (European 3rd-tier)	23	864	37.6	
FIBA EuroLeague (European 1st-tier)	125	4,047	32.4	
Career Totals	589	19,795	33.6	

=== Greek League season by season scoring stats ===
- (Regular season and postseason)

Season	Competition	Games Played	Points Scored	Scoring Average	Club
1979–80	Greek League	22	692	31.5	Aris
1980–81	Greek League	26	1,143	44.0	Aris
1981–82	Greek League	22	828	37.6	Aris
1982–83	Greek League	24	869	36.2	Aris
1983–84	Greek League	23	948	41.2	Aris
1984–85	Greek League	24	891	37.1	Aris
1985–86	Greek League	24	944	39.3	Aris
1986–87	Greek League	21	808	38.5	Aris
1987–88	Greek League	21	756	36.0	Aris
1988–89	Greek League	21	780	37.1	Aris
1989–90	Greek League	27	1,041	38.6	Aris
1990–91	Greek League	28	971	34.7	Aris
1991–92	Greek League	27	607	22.5	Aris
1992–93	Greek League	36	785	21.8	Panathinaikos
1993–94	Greek League	37	793	21.4	Panathinaikos
1994–95	Greek League	1	8	8.0	Panathinaikos
Career Totals		384	12,864	33.5	

=== Season by season scoring stats in European-wide leagues ===
Season	Competition	Games Played	Points Scored	Scoring Average	Club
FIBA Korać Cup (European 3rd-tier)
1980–81	FIBA Korać Cup	6	265	44.2	Aris
1981–82	FIBA Korać Cup	2	90	45.0	Aris
1982–83	FIBA Korać Cup	4	146	36.5	Aris
1984–85	FIBA Korać Cup	11	363	33.0	Aris
Career Totals	FIBA Korać Cup	23	864	37.6	
FIBA EuroLeague (European 1st-tier)
1983–84	FIBA EuroLeague	6	180	30.0	Aris
1985–86	FIBA EuroLeague	6	216	36.0	Aris
1986–87	FIBA EuroLeague	4	144	36.0	Aris
1987–88	FIBA EuroLeague	17	641	37.7	Aris
1988–89	FIBA EuroLeague	20	661	33.1	Aris
1989–90	FIBA EuroLeague	17	644	37.9	Aris
1990–91	FIBA EuroLeague	16	506	31.6	Aris
1991–92	FIBA EuroLeague	16	516	32.3	Aris
1993–94	FIBA EuroLeague	21	500	23.8	Panathinaikos
1994–95	FIBA EuroLeague	2	39	19.5	Panathinaikos
Career Totals	FIBA EuroLeague	125	4,047	32.4	
Career Totals	Korać Cup / EuroLeague	148	4,911	33.2	

== National team career ==
Galis first played with the Greece men's national basketball team at the 1980 FIBA European Olympic Qualifying Tournament. He averaged 20.5 points per game at the tournament. His tournament single-game scoring high was 30 points, which came in a game against Switzerland. However, Greece failed to qualify for the 1980 Moscow Summer Olympic Games. At the 1981 EuroBasket, Galis averaged 19.9 points per game. Greece finished the tournament in 9th place. At the 1983 EuroBasket, Galis averaged 33.6 points per game, and he was the tournament's leading scorer. Greece finished the tournament in 11th place.

On 20 November 1983, Galis played in a friendly game against the North Carolina Tar Heels, at The Demetria Tournament '83. The game took place at the Alexandreio Melathron arena. During that game, Galis, who was Greece's shooting guard, was guarded by North Carolina's shooting guard, Michael Jordan. Galis scored 24 points during the game.

At the 1984 FIBA European Olympic Qualifying Tournament, Galis averaged 31.6 points per game, and he was the tournament's leading scorer. His tournament single-game scoring high was 45 points, which came in a game against Great Britain. However, Greece failed to qualify for the 1984 Los Angeles Summer Olympic Games.

With Greece, Galis won the bronze medal at the 1984 Balkan Championship. At the 1986 FIBA World Championship, Galis led the tournament in scoring, as he averaged 33.7 points per game. During the tournament, he had a 53-point outburst in a game against Panama. Greece finished the tournament in 10th place. With Greece, Galis won the gold medal at the 1986 Balkan Championship.

Galis next led the Greece national team to the 1987 EuroBasket gold medal. Galis led the tournament in scoring, as he averaged 37.0 points per game. He scored 40 points in the tournament's finals against the Soviet Union national team and its legendary player, Šarūnas Marčiulionis, as he led Greece to a 103–101 victory. He was named the MVP of the tournament.

At the 1988 FIBA European Olympic Qualifying Tournament, Galis averaged 28.4 points per game, and he was the tournament's leading scorer. His tournament single-game scoring high was 35 points, which came in a game against Germany. However, Greece failed to qualify for the 1988 Seoul Summer Olympic Games.

Galis also led Greece to the silver medal at the 1989 EuroBasket, which he led in scoring, with an average of 35.6 points per game. Galis is most remembered from that tournament, for a stunning effort against the Soviet team led by Marčiulionis, and its other star player, Arvydas Sabonis, in their semifinals game. Galis scored 45 out of his team's 81 total points, in a dramatic last-gasp 81–80 victory. The Greek team then settled for a second-place finish, after they lost against the dominant Yugoslav national team, in the tournament's finals.

Galis also represented Greece at the 1991 FIBA Centennial Jubilee, which commemorated the 100th anniversary of the creation of the sport of basketball, by the Canadian James Naismith. The Jubilee tournament took place at the Peace and Friendship Stadium, in Piraeus, Athens, Greece. In three games played during the tournament, Galis averaged 21.0 points per game.

At the 1991 EuroBasket, Galis averaged 32.4 points per game, and he also led the tournament in scoring. In total, Galis was the leading scorer of the EuroBasket four times. He was also a four-time All-EuroBasket Team member.

In total, Galis played in 168 FIBA-recognized games with the Greece national team, in which he scored a total of 5,129 points, for a career scoring average of 30.5 points per game. Galis is in the second place, on the list of the all-time career scoring leaders in the history of Greece's senior national team. Panagiotis Giannakis is in first place on the list. The Hellenic Basketball Federation retired Galis' number 4 jersey of the Greek senior men's team, on 4 August 2023.

=== Greek senior national team career statistics ===
Competition	Games Played	Points Scored	Scoring Average	Ref.
FIBA Recognized Games (Greece National Team)	168	5,129	30.5	
FIBA Non-Recognized Games (Greece National Team)	1	38	38.0	
Career Totals	169	5,167	30.6	

=== Greece National Team scoring stats by tournament ===
Tournament	Games Played	Points Scored	Scoring Average
1980 Olympics Qualification	4	78	19.5
FIBA International Tournament (1980–89)	28	853	30.5
Friendlies (1981–91)	18	450	25.0
EuroBasket 1981 Qualification	8	225	28.1
EuroBasket 1981	8	161	20.1
1982 Balkan Games	4	97	24.3
EuroBasket 1983 Qualification	9	283	31.4
EuroBasket 1983	7	233	33.3
1984 Olympics Qualification	9	288	32.0
EuroBasket 1985 Qualification	5	178	35.6
1984 Balkan Games	3	89	29.7
1986 FIBA World Championship Qualification	6	206	34.3
1986 Acropolis International Tournament	3	108	36.0
1986 FIBA World Championship	10	337	33.7
1986 Balkan Games	3	117	39.0
1987 Acropolis International Tournament	3	112	37.3
EuroBasket 1987	8	296	37.0
1988 Olympics Qualification	9	254	28.2
EuroBasket 1989 Qualification	4	146	36.5
1989 Acropolis International Tournament	3	113	37.7
EuroBasket 1989	5	178	35.6
1990 Acropolis International Tournament	1	8	8.0
EuroBasket 1991 Qualification	3	134	44.7
1991 FIBA Centennial Jubilee	3	63	21.0
EuroBasket 1991	5	162	32.4
Career Totals	169	5,167	30.6

=== Galis' top 10 scoring FIBA games ===
Points Scored	Date	Opponents	Final Game Score	Tournament
53	7/5/1986	Panama	110–81	1986 FIBA World Championship
52	9/10/1984	Poland	88–89	EuroBasket 1985 Qualification
49	7/20/1986	China	111–112	1986 FIBA World Championship
48	1/4/1981	Finland	101–92	FIBA International Tournament
48	11/19/1989	Denmark	113–91	Friendly
47	11/29/1984	Bulgaria	91–84	1986 FIBA World Championship Qualification
47	5/23/1982	Belgium	97–72	EuroBasket 1983 Qualification
46	6/20/1986	Netherlands	104–88	1986 Acropolis International Tournament
46	11/25/1989	Romania	97–77	EuroBasket 1991 Qualification
45	6/24/1989	Soviet Union	81–80	EuroBasket 1989

== Highest scoring single games by competition ==
Points Scored	Competition	Game	Year	Ref.
53 points	FIBA World Cup	Greece vs. Panama	1986	
46 points	FIBA EuroBasket	Greece vs. Sweden	1983	
52 points (2×)	FIBA EuroLeague (1st tier)	Aris vs. Oostende & Aris vs. Lech Poznań	1986 & 1989	
56 points	FIBA Korać Cup (3rd tier)	Aris vs. Vasas	1980	
62 points	Greek League	Ionikos Nikaias vs. Aris	1981	
52 points	Greek Cup	Aris vs. Panellinios	1987	
44 points	Greek Super Cup	Aris vs. Panathinaikos	1986	
48 points	NCAA Division I	Seton Hall Pirates vs. Santa Clara Broncos	1978	

== Player profile ==
Galis was known for his scoring ability, playmaking and passing. The majority of his scoring came in the paint, aided by his penetration ability, while his mid-range jump shot was considered one of his primary offensive strengths. Despite being shorter than many players at his position, his strength and leaping ability contributed to an effective post game against opposing guards. He was also noted for his physical conditioning, and stamina. During the 1987 EuroBasket, Galis reportedly played throughout all the games in the tournament and was never substituted out, contributing to the nickname "The Iron Man".

== Post-playing career and personal life ==
Galis is married to Eleni Panagiotou, and he has one daughter, named Stella. Since his official retirement from playing professional club basketball on September 29, 1995, and up until early 2006, Galis was the owner of a summer basketball camp in Chalkidiki, Greece. The basketball camp was listed at the Athens Stock Exchange. As a token of appreciation for his contribution to Greek sport, Galis was chosen to be the first torch bearer, in the final round of the Olympic Flame, for the Athens 2004 Summer Olympics. Galis entered the stadium at the conclusion of the Opening Ceremony, and set off the procession of the flame to the altar.

In September 2007, Galis was inducted as a member of the first class of the FIBA Hall of Fame, which includes the best basketball players in the history of the game internationally. Galis was inducted as a player. Bill Russell, of the famous Boston Celtics dynasty, was another one of the 16 inaugural player inductees. Galis was also entered into the Eurobasket.com website's European Basketball Hall of Fame, inducted as a player.

In May 2013, his former club team Aris Thessaloniki, renamed the court of their home arena, the Alexandreio Melathron, to "Nick Galis Hall". The club also organized a celebration of Galis' life and career, and retired his number 6 Aris jersey. The event was attended by many of his former teammates and opponents, from the 1980s and 1990s. Some of the attendees included the majority of the Greece men's national basketball team's 1987 EuroBasket gold medal-winning team, as well as numerous other international basketball stars who played against Galis over the years, such as Dino Rađa, Jordi Villacampa, and Doron Jamchi, among others.

On April 1, 2017, it was announced that Galis would be inducted into the Naismith Memorial Basketball Hall of Fame, as part of the 2017 Hall of Fame class. Galis was later inducted into the Naismith Memorial Basketball Hall of Fame, on September 9, 2017. He became one of the very few men's basketball players from around the world, to be inducted into the Basketball Hall of Fame, without having ever played in the NBA. On June 14, 2016, exactly 29 years after Greece's national team won the gold medal at the 1987 EuroBasket, the court of the biggest basketball arena in Greece, the OAKA Olympic Indoor Hall, was named the "Nikos Galis Olympic Indoor Hall", in his honour.

His number 6 jersey which he wore while playing with the Greek National Team was retired on August 4, 2023, by the Greek Basketball Federation in the "Nikos Galis Olympic Indoor Hall".

== Quotes about Galis ==
"I never thought that there was such a good offensive player in Europe, and especially in Greece." — Michael Jordan

"I've seen Galis do things, that I've seen neither Lakers nor Celtics do." — Bob McAdoo

"I admire him. When he plays one on one, there's no way to stop him. I didn't think that there would ever be a player, who by himself, could cause nightmares and even beat the Soviet Union." — Sergei Belov

"If Galis wants to score, he will score no matter who's defending him." — Arvydas Sabonis

"If I'm The Son of the Devil, then Galis is The Devil himself." — Dražen Petrović

'"I'd like to be on the same team with him, so I could pass to him, and then watch him score a basket." — Dražen Petrović

"Although Drazen (i.e. Petrović) is my brother, for the best athlete of 1987, I voted for Galis."' — Aco Petrović

"Galis is a great player. He is one of the best European players. He was a really tough opponent, he floated in the air, he was one of the best." — Dino Radja

"Petrović and Galis were the most charismatic players I've ever known. Galis is the only player who made me shudder." — Doron Jamchi

"Everyone who plays basketball, owes Galis money." — Fanis Christodoulou

"If we played together, we would have scored 300 points in every game!" — Vassilis Goumas

"The man is a computer! If he had played with us in AEK in the '60s, we would have been undefeated." — Georgios Amerikanos

"A European and Greek basketball changed. It is my honor to play with him. He is the greatest of all time. " — Sasha Volkov

"I've seen many players in my career, but what Galis does on the floor, only 2–3 in the world can do." — Audie Norris

"Who wouldn't want to play with Galis? I would definitely give the ball to Galis on the last play. Galis changed basketball in Greece and Europe." — Audie Norris

"Galis wasn't affected by anything. I count him among the five best players of Europe." — Georgios Sigalas

"In Greece, Galis is what Michael Jordan is in America." — Steve Giatzoglou

"Galis is the player of the 21st century." — Alexander Gomelsky, USSR head coach.

"I had nightmares of Galis all night." — Pierre Dao, Limoges head coach.

"I had given specific instructions on how to defend against the other 4 players. As for Nikos, we just had to sit down and pray!" — Wojciech Krajewski, Lech Poznan head coach.

"There is only one way I can think of to stop Nikos from scoring. Lock him up in his hotel room, so that he can't come to the arena." — Ruud Harrewijn, Dutch national team head coach.

== Awards and accomplishments ==
Galis won numerous titles and awards during his career and had many memorable single game performances. The following are some of them:

=== College ===
- Haggerty Award (New York Metro Area Player of the Year): 1979
- ECAC Player of the Year: 1979
- Member of the Seton Hall Athletic Hall of Fame: 1991

=== Pro career ===
Titles:

- 8× Greek League Champion: 1983, 1985, 1986, 1987, 1988, 1989, 1990, 1991
- 7× Greek Cup Winner: 1985, 1987, 1988, 1989, 1990, 1992, 1993
- Greek Super Cup Winner: 1986
  (In total, he won 16 trophies in his pro club career as a player.)

Personal awards and achievements:

- 11× Greek League Top Scorer: 1981, 1982, 1983, 1984, 1985, 1986, 1987, 1988, 1989, 1990, 1991
- Greek Super Cup Finals Top Scorer: 1986
- 3× Greek Male Athlete of the Year: 1986, 1987, 1989
- 5× Greek Cup Finals Top Scorer: 1987, 1989, 1990, 1992, 1993
- 4× Greek League Finals MVP: 1988, 1989, 1990, 1991
- 2× FIBA European Selection: 1987, 1991 I
- Mediterranean Player of the Year: 1987
- Euroscar European Player of the Year: 1987
- Mr. Europa European Player of the Year: 1987
- L'Équipe Champion of Champions' 10th Best Athlete in the World: 1987
- 5× FIBA EuroLeague Top Scorer: 1988, 1989, 1990, 1992, 1994
- 5× Greek League MVP: 1988, 1989, 1990, 1991, 1992
- 4× Greek League Assist Leader: 1991, 1992, 1993, 1994
- 2× Greek League All-Star (1991, 1994 I)
- FIBA EuroLeague Assists Leader: 1994
- FIBA EuroLeague All-Final Four Team: (1994)
- EuroLeague Final Four all-time career scoring leader: 231 points (28.9 points per game).
- Greek Championship (amateur era) all-time career scoring leader: 12,864 points (33.5 points per game) – Vassilis Spanoulis is the league's professional era all-time career scoring leader.
- Greek Cup all-time career scoring leader: 1,935 points (35.2 points per game).
- FIBA's 50 Greatest Players: 1991
- Member of the FIBA Hall of Fame: 2007
- 50 Greatest EuroLeague Contributors: 2008
- No. 6 jersey retired by Aris: 2013
- Member of the Naismith Memorial Basketball Hall of Fame: 2017
- 101 Greats of European Basketball: 2018
- HoopsHype's 75 Greatest International Players Ever: 2021
- Greek Basket League Hall of Fame: 2022
- Along with Panagiotis Giannakis, he led Aris Thessaloniki to an 80-game winning streak in the Greek League, in the 1980s.
- His personal career single-game scoring high in a Greek League game was 62 points, which was achieved in a game on 24 January 1981, during the 1980–81 season (Aris Thessaloniki vs. Ionikos Nikaias). However, in the same game, Ionikos' superstar, Panagiotis Giannakis, who would later go on to become Galis' teammate on Aris, scored 73 points.
- His personal career single-game scoring high in the Greek Cup tournament was 52 points against Panellinios Athens, in the 1987 Greek Cup Final (15 April 1987).
- His personal career single-game scoring high in a European-wide continental club competition was 56 points against Vasas (5 November 1980), during the 1980–81 season of the FIBA Korać Cup.
- His personal career single-game scoring high in the FIBA European Champions' Cup (now called the EuroLeague), was 52 points, which he achieved twice. He scored 52 points versus Oostende in 1986–87 (2 October 1986). He also scored 52 points versus Lech Poznań in 1989–90 (7 December 1989).
- In 1993, while playing in the Greek League with Panathinaikos Athens, in a revenge game against his former team Aris Thessaloniki, he had a game for the ages. In the game, Galis made all 13 of his field goal attempts.
- 4,047 points scored in 125 FIBA EuroLeague games played (32.4 points per game), and 864 points scored in 23 FIBA Korać Cup games played (37.6 points per game).

=== Greece National Team ===
- 1983 EuroBasket: All-Tournament Team
- 1984 Balkan Championship: Bronze
- 1986 FIBA World Championship: Top Scorer (33.7 points per game)
- 1986 Balkan Championship: Gold
- 1987 EuroBasket: Gold
- 1989 EuroBasket: Silver
- 1987 EuroBasket: Most Valuable Player
- 4× FIBA EuroBasket All-Tournament Team: 1983, 1987, 1989, 1991
- 4× FIBA EuroBasket Top Scorer: 1983 (33.6 points per game), 1987 (37.0 points per game), 1989 (35.6 points per game), 1991 (32.4 points per game)
- 2× FIBA European Olympic Qualification Top Scorer: 1984 (31.6 points per game), 1988 (28.4 points per game)
- At the 1986 FIBA World Championship, he scored 53 points in a game against Panama.
- In the 1987 EuroBasket Finals, he scored 40 points against the Soviet Union.
- In the 1989 EuroBasket Semifinals, he scored 45 points against the Soviet Union.
- In 168 FIBA-recognized games played with the Greece men's national basketball team, he averaged 30.5 points per game.
- Greece men's national basketball team's 2nd all-time career scoring leader (behind Panagiotis Giannakis): 5,167 total points scored, in 169 total games played (30.6 points per game). However, only 5,129 points in 168 games (30.5 points per game), is officially recognized.
- Galis was the top scorer in every major European and world international competition that he participated in from 1983 onward: the 1983 EuroBasket, the 1984 FIBA European Olympic Qualification, the 1986 FIBA World Championship, the 1987 EuroBasket, the 1988 FIBA European Olympic Qualification, the 1989 EuroBasket, and the 1991 EuroBasket.
- His number 4 jersey of the Greece national team, was retired by the decision of the Hellenic Basketball Federation.

== See also ==
- Players with the most points scored in the Amateur Greek Basketball Championship (1963–1992)
- Players with the most points scored in a single game in the Amateur Greek Basketball Championship (1963–1992)
