= Panagiotis Giannakis =

Greek basketball player and coach

Panagiotis Giannakis Παναγιώτης Γιαννάκης
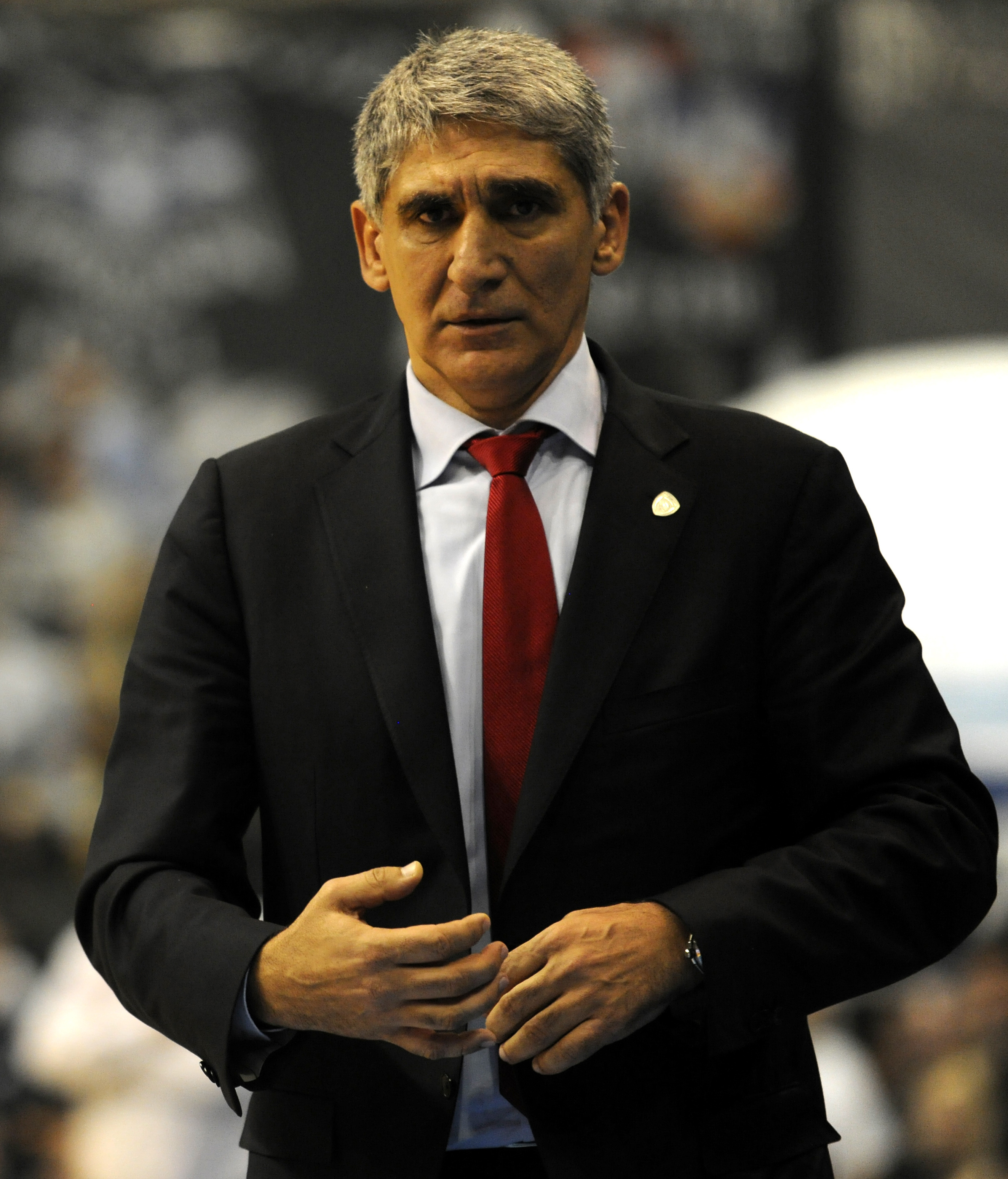
- Giannakis in 2009

Personal information
- Born: January 1, 1959 (age 67) Nikaia, Attica, Greece
- Listed height: 1.93 m (6 ft 4 in)
- Listed weight: 216 lb (98 kg)

Career information
- College: Hellenic College (1981–1982)
- NBA draft: 1982: 9th round, 205th overall pick
- Drafted by: Boston Celtics
- Playing career: 1972–1996
- Position: Point guard / shooting guard
- Number: 5, 6, 8, 10
- Coaching career: 1997–2018

Career history

Playing
- 1972–1984: Ionikos Nikaias
- 1984–1993: Aris
- 1993–1994: Panionios
- 1994–1996: Panathinaikos

Coaching
- 1997–1998: Greece
- 2001–2002: Panionios
- 2002–2006: Maroussi
- 2004–2008: Greece
- 2008–2010: Olympiacos
- 2012–2013: Limoges
- 2013–2014: China
- 2017–2018: Aris

Career highlights
- As a player: EuroLeague champion (1996); 4× FIBA European Selection (1980, 1987, 1990, 1991 I); 50 Greatest EuroLeague Contributors (2008); 101 Greats of European Basketball (2018); FIBA Saporta Cup champion (1993); 7× Greek League champion (1985–1991); 7× Greek Cup winner (1985, 1987–1990, 1992, 1996); Greek Super Cup winner (1986); Greek League Top Scorer (1980); 4× Greek All-Star (1991, 1994 I, 1994 II, 1996 I); Greek League assist leader (1989); 2× Greek Cup Finals Top Scorer (1985, 1988); Greek 2nd Division champion (1975); Greek League Hall of Fame (2022); As a head coach: Greek Cup winner (2010); FIBA EuroStar (2007); 2× All-Greek Sports Coach of the Year (2005, 2006); 2× Greek League Coach of the Year (2004, 2006)
- Stats at Basketball Reference
- FIBA Hall of Fame
Medals
Event	1st	2nd	3rd
FIBA EuroBasket	1	1	0
Mediterranean Games	1	0	0
Balkan Championship	2	1	4
FIBA U-16 European Championship	0	1	0
Total	4	3	4
Men's basketball
Representing Greece
FIBA EuroBasket
Gold medal – first place	1987 Greece	
Silver medal – second place	1989 Yugoslavia	
Mediterranean Games
Gold medal – first place	1979 Yugoslavia	
Balkan Championship
Gold medal – first place	1979 Greece	
Gold medal – first place	1986 Bulgaria	
Silver medal – second place	1983 Yugoslavia	
Bronze medal – third place	1976 Bulgaria	
Bronze medal – third place	1977 Yugoslavia	
Bronze medal – third place	1980 Romania	
Bronze medal – third place	1984 Greece	
FIBA Europe Under-16 Championship
Silver medal – second place	1975 Greece	Under-16
Head Coach for Greece
FIBA World Cup
Silver medal – second place	2006 Japan	
FIBA Stanković World Cup
Gold medal – first place	2006 China	
FIBA EuroBasket
Gold medal – first place	2005 Serbia & Montenegro	

Panagiotis "Notis" Giannakis (Greek: Παναγιώτης "Νότης" Γιαννάκης, pronounced [panaˈʝotis ʝaˈnacis]; born January 1, 1959), alternatively spelled Panayiotis Yiannakis or Yannakis, is a former Greek professional basketball player and coach. He is considered to be one of the greatest sportspeople of Greece. He started his senior career at the age of just 13 at Ionikos Nikaias and after noticeable success, he achieved extraordinary success as a player with Aris Thessaloniki from 1984 to 1993, in partnership with Greek basketball's biggest star Nikos Galis, while achieving victory as the national team captain in EuroBasket 1987 in Athens, Greece's first major tournament win in non-Olympic sport which, along with Aris' extraordinary success, cultivated the sport in the country. At the end of his career, he won the EuroLeague with Panathinaikos in 1996. As head coach, he most prominently led Greece to its second European trophy in EuroBasket 2005 at Serbia and Montenegro, where a team of new and talented stars shone brightest under the nurturship of Giannakis. He would repeat the success the next year, acquiring the silver medal at the 2006 FIBA World Championship in Japan, where the team most notably scored a decisive win against the USA stars of the NBA in the semi-final, which would be USMNBT's last loss in a tournament until 2019. However, Greece's arch rivals Spain would defeat Giannakis' team in the final, as they would do again in the semi-finals of the 2007 EuroBasket. Outside of the Greek national team, he would coach Greek clubs like Aris, where he had the most success as player, Olympiacos, where he achieved renewed success, and the China men's national basketball team. As a player, he was primarily a point guard, but he could also play at the shooting guard position. During his playing career, Giannakis was also widely-known under his nickname of "O Drákos" (Ο Δράκος), or "The Dragon" in English.

On February 3, 2008, Giannakis was chosen as one of the 50 Greatest EuroLeague Contributors, over the previous half-century, by EuroLeague Basketball's Experts Committee. In 2018, he was named one of the 101 Greats of European Basketball. In 2021, he was inducted into the FIBA Hall of Fame. In 2022, he was inducted into the Greek Basket League Hall of Fame.

A true floor general, Giannakis began his club basketball playing career in Greece, with Ionikos Nikaias. After that, he before moved to the Greek club Aris Thessaloniki, where he spent the most important part of his pro playing career. In Thessaloniki, he helped to lead "The Yellows" (Aris) to three consecutive EuroLeague Final Four appearances between 1988 and 1990, as well as to a FIBA European Cup (later renamed to Saporta Cup) title in 1993. In the summer of 1993, he was transferred to the Greek club Panionios Athens, and finally a year later, to the Greek club Panathinaikos Athens, with whom he won a EuroLeague championship in 1996.

Giannakis was, along with Nikos Galis, Panagiotis Fasoulas, and Fanis Christodoulou, one of the four main stars of the legendary late 1980s Greece men's national basketball team that put Greece on the world basketball map. He was Greece's team captain, when they won the gold medal at the EuroBasket of 1987, and were the silver-medalists at the same championship two years later. Furthermore, Giannakis was also an important member of the Greece men's national team, when they reached the EuroBasket's semifinals in 1993 and 1995, as well as the FIBA World Cup's semifinals in 1994.

After his playing career ended, Giannakis was the head coach of the Athenian professional club team, Maroussi Athens, which he led to the forefront of the Greek League. Giannakis was also the head coach of the Greek EuroLeague powerhouse Olympiacos Piraeus, which he led to the 2010 EuroLeague Final, and of the Greece men's national basketball team. Under Giannakis' guidance, the Greece men's national team won the gold medal at the 2005 EuroBasket, and the silver medal at the 2006 FIBA World Cup in Japan, where Greece upset Team USA, by a score of 101–95. He was also the head coach of the senior Chinese national team.

== Early years ==
Giannakis was born and raised in a poor neighborhood of Nikaia, Piraeus. Ηis father Dimitris, hailed from Asia Minor, and was an owner of a motorbike workshop; his mother Kalliope, was a weaver. Giannakis is the youngest of five brothers.

Giannakis started playing football around his neighborhood. He showed an early inclination to sports, and also tried the sport of basketball. He began watching the games of a local basketball club, and he was later approached by the head coach of the youth team of Ionikos Nikaias, who asked him to join their team.

== Club playing career ==
=== Ionikos Nikaias ===
Giannakis began his club career with the youth teams of Ionikos Nikaias, in 1971. His first head coach, George Vassilakopoulos, moved Giannakis up to the club's senior men's first team, from the youth squad, in 1972, when he was at the age of just 13. The club was playing in the Greek 2nd Division at the time. In 1975, the club was promoted up to the top-tier level Greek First Division. Giannakis' exceptional play with Ionikos Nikaias, at such a young age, drew the eyes of pro basketball experts on him.

On January 24, 1981, Ionikos Nikaias, led by a then 22-year-old Giannakis, played against Aris Thessaloniki, which was led by Nikos Galis. Aris won in a tight game, by a score of 114–113. The game is memorable in the history of Greek pro club basketball, because in the game, Giannakis scored 73 points, and Galis scored 62 points, as they achieved the second and fourth most points ever scored in a single game of the Greek League basketball championship.

=== Boston Celtics ===
In 1981, the American basketball coach Dick Dukeshire, who had coached Giannakis with the senior Greek men's national team, asked Giannakis to move to the United States, to play college basketball at the Hellenic College. Dukeshire believed that Giannakis was good enough to play in the NBA. At that time, the Boston Celtics used the facilities of the Hellenic College's campus in Brookline, Massachusetts, for their training camp and practices. Dukeshire believed that if Giannakis was training with the school's team at the same time that the Celtics were there, that he had a chance to make the Celtics roster. Giannakis eventually agreed to move to the US, and he joined the Hellenic College Owls team.

While at training at Hellenic College, Giannakis was eventually noticed by the Celtics, and they invited him to join the team's 1981 summer league camp. However, during the summer training camp, Giannakis suffered a career-threatening knee injury that required multiple knee surgeries, and a lot of rehab time. During the knee surgery operation, it was also decided by the surgeon performing the procedure, that Giannakis' ACL would have to be removed from his knee. Giannakis was told by the doctor that performed the surgery that he didn't think it was possible for him to play professional basketball again. However, after ultimately recovering from his knee surgery, Giannakis went on to average 25 points per game with the Hellenic College Owls, during the 1981–82 season. After that, Giannakis then went back to Greece, where he finished the '81–'82 season with his previous club team, Ionikos Nikaias, in order to help them avoid a league relegation from Greece's top-tier level competition, the Greek Basket League.

Giannakis was ultimately selected by the Boston Celtics, in the 9th round of the 1982 NBA draft, with the 205th overall draft pick. Giannakis then took part in the team's 1982–83 preseason training camp. About a week before the start of the regular season, the Celtics traded center Dave Cowens to the Milwaukee Bucks, in exchange for point guard Quinn Buckner, and due to that, they no longer had the need for another point guard. The Celtics then asked Giannakis to join their CBA affiliate team, as a way to test how he could adjust to the American style of basketball, with the chance for him to earn an NBA contract with the main team later on. However, Giannakis declined the offer, and returned to Greece, where he would play for the rest of his career.

=== Aris Thessaloniki ===
On August 3, 1984, Giannakis transferred to the Greek club Aris Thessaloniki, after the club paid a transfer fee contract buyout to Ionikos Nikaias for his player rights, in the amount of 42 million Greek Drachmas, which was considered a huge amount of money for a transfer buyout at that time. Giannakis also personally received a BMW car, a sporting goods store, and an 8 million drachmas signing bonus from Aris. With Aris, Giannakis teamed up with Nikos Galis, to form one half of an historic "tag-team", that took both Greek and European basketball by storm, for the years to come. From the 6th of March 1985, to the 5th of November 1988, the backcourt duo of Galis and Giannakis, led Aris Thessaloniki to an 80-game winning streak in the Greek League.

Giannakis' first season with Aris Thessaloniki, the 1984–85 season, was a great success. He won both the Greek League championship, and the Greek Cup title. In the final of the latter, Giannakis made 8-out-of-12 three-pointers, and led his team to victory over Panathinaikos Athens. And that was only the beginning, as six more consecutive Greek League championships, and five more Greek Cup titles with Aris were to follow.

With Aris Thessaloniki, Giannakis also took part in three consecutive EuroLeague Final Fours. He played at the 1988 Ghent Final Four, at the 1989 Munich Final Four, and at the 1990 Zaragoza Final Four. Aris Thessloniki joined the elite of European basketball clubs at that time, but a European-wide title did not come for Giannakis and his team until a few years later.

In June 1991, Giannakis was chosen as a member of The Balkans Selection All-Star Team that played against The European Selection All-Star Team, at the 1991 FIBA Centennial Jubilee. The 1991 FIBA Jubilee event was held in order to commemorate the 100th anniversary of the creation of the sport of basketball in 1891, by the Canadian James Naismith. The FIBA Jubilee All-Star Game took place at the Peace and Friendship Stadium, in Piraeus, Athens, Greece, and it included numerous legends of European basketball. The Balkans' All-Star Selection won the game, by a score of 103–102.

In the 1992–93 season, Aris and Giannakis won the championship of the European-wide secondary-level FIBA European Cup competition, which later became known as the FIBA Saporta Cup. Aris beat the Turkish Super League club Efes Istanbul, by a score of 50–48 in the final, which was held in Turin. By then, Nikos Galis had already previously left Aris Thessaloniki, and joined Panathinaikos Athens, and Giannakis had become the de facto leader and franchise player of Aris.

=== Panionios Athens ===
In 1993, after spending nine seasons with Aris Thessaloniki, Giannakis moved to the Greek club Panionios Athens. With Panionios Athens, he averaged 14.0 points, 3.6 rebounds, 3.3 assists, and 1.4 steals per game, in the Greek Basket League's 1993–94 season. In that same season, he also competed with the club in the European-wide third-level competition, the FIBA Korać Cup. During the Korać Cup season, he averaged 17.0 points, 3.7 rebounds, 3.4 assists, and 2.0 steals per game.

=== Panathinaikos Athens ===
After spending a season with Panionios Athens, Giannakis then moved to the Greek club Panathinaikos Athens, where he played from 1994 to 1996. It was with Panathinaikos Athens that he finished his club playing career. With Panathinaikos Athens, Giannakis finally won the championship of the top-level European-wide club competition, the FIBA EuroLeague. Panathinaikos and Giannakis won the title at the 1996 Paris Final Four. He also won the Greek Cup title with Panathinaikos Athens that same year. It was the seventh Greek Cup title that he had won in his playing career, to go along with his seven Greek League championships. Giannakis ended his pro club playing career in 1996. During his club playing career he competed in a total of five EuroLeague Final Fours, as he played in three with Aris Thessaloniki, and two with Panathinaikos Athens.

Overall, during his pro club career, Giannakis scored a total of 9,291 points, in 493 games played in the Greek Basket League, for a career scoring average of 18.8 points per game. While in the EuroLeague, he scored a total of 1,514 points, in 119 games played, for a career scoring average of 12.7 points per game.

== National team playing career ==
Giannakis led the Greek under-16 junior national team to the silver medal at the FIBA Europe Under-16 Championship of 1975. A year later, he debuted with the Greece men's national basketball team, as a 17-year-old, versus the Czechoslovak national team. With Greece's junior national teams, he also played at the 1976 FIBA Europe Under-18 Championship, and at the 1978 FIBA Europe Under-18 Championship.

Giannakis' first appearance with Greece at a major FIBA international tournament, was at the 1979 EuroBasket. He won gold medals at the 1979 Balkan Championship, and at the 1979 Mediterranean Games. Giannakis also represented Greece at the 1980 FIBA European Olympic Qualifying Tournament, the 1981 EuroBasket, the 1983 EuroBasket, the 1984 FIBA European Olympic Qualifying Tournament, and at the 1986 FIBA World Cup. With Greece, he won the gold medal at the 1986 Balkan Championship.

Giannakis was the team captain of the Greece men's national team that won the gold medal at the 1987 EuroBasket. He also played with Greece at the 1988 FIBA European Olympic Qualifying Tournament. He won the silver medal at the 1989 EuroBasket, and he also represented Greece at the 1990 FIBA World Cup.

Giannakis also represented Greece at the 1991 FIBA Centennial Jubilee, which commemorated the 100th anniversary of the creation of the sport of basketball, by the Canadian James Naismith. The Jubilee tournament took place at the Peace and Friendship Stadium, in Piraeus, Athens, Greece. In three games played during the tournament, Giannakis averaged 14.3 points per game.

Galis also played with Greece at the following major tournaments: the 1991 EuroBasket, the 1992 FIBA European Olympic Qualifying Tournament, the 1993 EuroBasket, the 1994 FIBA World Cup, and the 1995 EuroBasket. Gianankis retired from the Greece men's national team as a player, on August 2, 1996, after competing with Greece at the 1996 Atlanta Summer Olympics.

During his playing time with the Greece men's national team, Giannakis participated in 29 official FIBA international competitions, and in 40 official international competitions overall. Giannakis holds the all-time career record for the most caps with the Greece senior men's national team, with 351. That is also the all-time career record for any European national team. He also holds the all-time career record for the most total points scored with the Greece senior men's national team, with 5,301 points. That is also the all-time career record for any European national team.

== Career as a head coach ==
=== National teams ===
==== Greece ====
Unconventionally, the very next year after he retired from playing with the Greece men's national team, Giannakis started his coaching career as the head coach of the Greece men's national basketball team, in 1997. He stayed as the head coach of the Greece national team for two years. He led the team to a fourth-place finish at the 1997 EuroBasket, and to a fourth-place finish at the 1998 FIBA World Cup.

Giannakis returned to the head coach position of the Greece men's national team in 2004, for the 2004 Athens Summer Olympics, where he led the Greek team to a fifth-place finish. Next year, under his coaching guidance, Greece won the 2005 EuroBasket gold medal, which marked the second time that Greece had won the EuroBasket title, and the first time they had won it since 1987. Giannakis became the first person to win the EuroBasket, both as a player (1987), and as a head coach (2005).

In 2006, he coached the Greece men's national team to a second-place finish at the 2006 FIBA World Cup. In the World Cup's semifinals, which were held on September 1, 2006, Giannakis' Greek team beat the heavily favored Team USA for the first time, by a score of 101–95. After 2006, Giannakis no longer simultaneously coached on both the professional club and national team levels, as he decided to focus his full attention on the Greece men's national team only. Giannakis' salary with the Greece men's national team, eventually reached an annual rate of €1.2 million net income.

At the 2007 EuroBasket, Giannakis led Greece to a fourth-place finish. At the 2008 Beijing Summer Olympics, he led Greece to a fifth-place finish. In December 2008, Giannakis ended his tenure as the head coach of Greece's senior national team. He was succeeded in that role by Jonas Kazlauskas.

==== China ====
Giannakis was also the head coach of the senior men's Chinese national team. He coached China at the 2013 FIBA Asia Championship. China finished the tournament in fifth place.

=== Pro clubs ===
After starting his coaching career as the head coach of the Greek, Giannakis also moved into coaching in the professional club level. He coached the Greek League club Panionios Athens, until 2002, when he was then named the head coach of the Greek club Maroussi Athens. He stayed with Maroussi Athens until 2006. During his time with Maroussi Athens, along with the help of his young star point guard, named Vassilis Spanoulis, whose playing style and player attributes were often compared to Giannakis', he took the club from relative obscurity, and turned it into the third most prominent team in the Greek League, during that era.

On 3 February 2008, Giannakis signed on to be the head coach of the Greek EuroLeague power Olympiacos Piraeus. He signed a two-and-a-half-year contract with the team, at an annual salary of €1.1 million net income. In June 2010, Olympiacos Piraeus announced that Giannakis would not coach their team in the next season.

During the two-and-a-half-year period that he coached Olympiacos Piraeus, Giannakis had led the team to the 2010 Greek Cup title, which was the team's first title won in eight years, and to three consecutive Greek League Finals appearances (2008, 2009, 2010). He also led the team to two consecutive EuroLeague Final Four appearances (2009 and 2010), which were the club's first EuroLeague Final Four appearances since the 1999 Final Four. Those two Final Four appearances also included a EuroLeague Finals appearance (2010).

After that, Giannakis worked as the head coach of the French League club Limoges, during the 2012–13 season. He became the head coach of the Greek club Aris Thessaloniki, in 2017.

== Personal life ==
Giannakis is married to Eugenia, and he has two children, Kalliope and Dimitris. In 2010, he lost his brother (all four of his brothers died during a 10-year span) before an Olympiacos Piraeus rivalry derby with Panathinaikos Athens.

== Awards and accomplishments ==
(As a player):

=== Club career ===
- Greek 2nd Division Champion: (1975)
- Greek League Top Scorer: (1980)
- 4× FIBA European Selection: (1980, 1987, 1990, 1991 I)
- 2× Greek Cup Finals Top Scorer: (1985, 1988)
- Greek League Assist leader: (1989)
- His personal best for points scored in a single game was 73 points scored, in 1981, as a player of Ionikos Nikaias (which ironically occurred against Aris, his future team).
- Selected by the NBA professional club the Boston Celtics, in the 1982 NBA draft.
- Won 17 first-tier titles in his pro club career:
  - EuroLeague champion: (1996)
  - FIBA European Cup (Saporta Cup) Champion: (1993)
  - 7× Consecutive Greek League Champion: (1985, 1986, 1987, 1988, 1989, 1990, 1991)
  - 7× Greek Cup Winner: (1985, 1987, 1988, 1989, 1990, 1992, 1996)
  - Greek Super Cup Winner: (1986)
- 4× Greek League All-Star (1991, 1994 I, 1994 II, 1996 I)
- Along with Nikos Galis, he led Aris to an 80-game winning streak in the Greek League, in the 1980s.
- When he retired from his club playing career, he held the record for the most games played in the Greek Basketball Championship (493).
- He scored 9,291 points in the Greek Basketball Championship (counting all league formats since the 1963–64 season) (3rd all-time).
- EuroLeague's 50th anniversary 50 Greatest EuroLeague Contributors List: (2008)
- 101 Greats of European Basketball: (2018)
- FIBA Hall of Fame: (2021)
- Greek Basket League Hall of Fame: (2022)

=== Greece youth national team ===
- 1975 FIBA Europe Under-16 Championship: Silver

=== Greece national team ===
- 1976 Balkan Championship: Bronze
- 1977 Balkan Championship: Bronze
- 1979 Balkan Championship: Gold
- 1979 Mediterranean Games: Gold
- 1980 Balkan Championship: Bronze
- 1983 Balkan Championship: Silver
- 1984 Balkan Championship: Bronze
- 1986 Balkan Championship: Gold
- 1987 EuroBasket: Gold
- 1989 EuroBasket: Silver
- Greece national team record holder for most caps, men's and senior men's combined, with 403.
- Greece national team record holder for most points scored, men's and senior men's combined, with 6,291.
- Greek senior national team record holder for most caps, with 351.
- Greece national team record holder for most points scored, with 5,301.
- FIBA Europe record holder for most senior national team caps, with 351.
- FIBA Europe record holder for most senior national team points scored, with 5,301.

(As a head coach):

=== Club career ===
- 2× Greek League Coach of the Year: (2004, 2006)
- FIBA EuroStar: (2007)
- Greek Cup Winner: (2010)

=== Greek senior national team ===
- 2005 EuroBasket: Gold
- 2× All-Greek Sports Coach of the Year: (2005, 2006)
- 2006 Stanković World Cup: Gold
- 2006 FIBA World Cup: Silver
- He is the only person to win the FIBA EuroBasket, both as a player (1987), and as a head coach (2005).

== See also ==
- Players with the most points scored in the Amateur Greek Basketball Championship (1963–1992)
- Players with the most points scored in a single game in the Amateur Greek Basketball Championship (1963–1992)
- List of FIBA EuroBasket winning head coaches

Sporting positions
Preceded by Antanas Sireika	EuroBasket; Winning Coach; 2005	Succeeded by David Blatt
