= Georgi Glouchkov =

Bulgarian basketball player

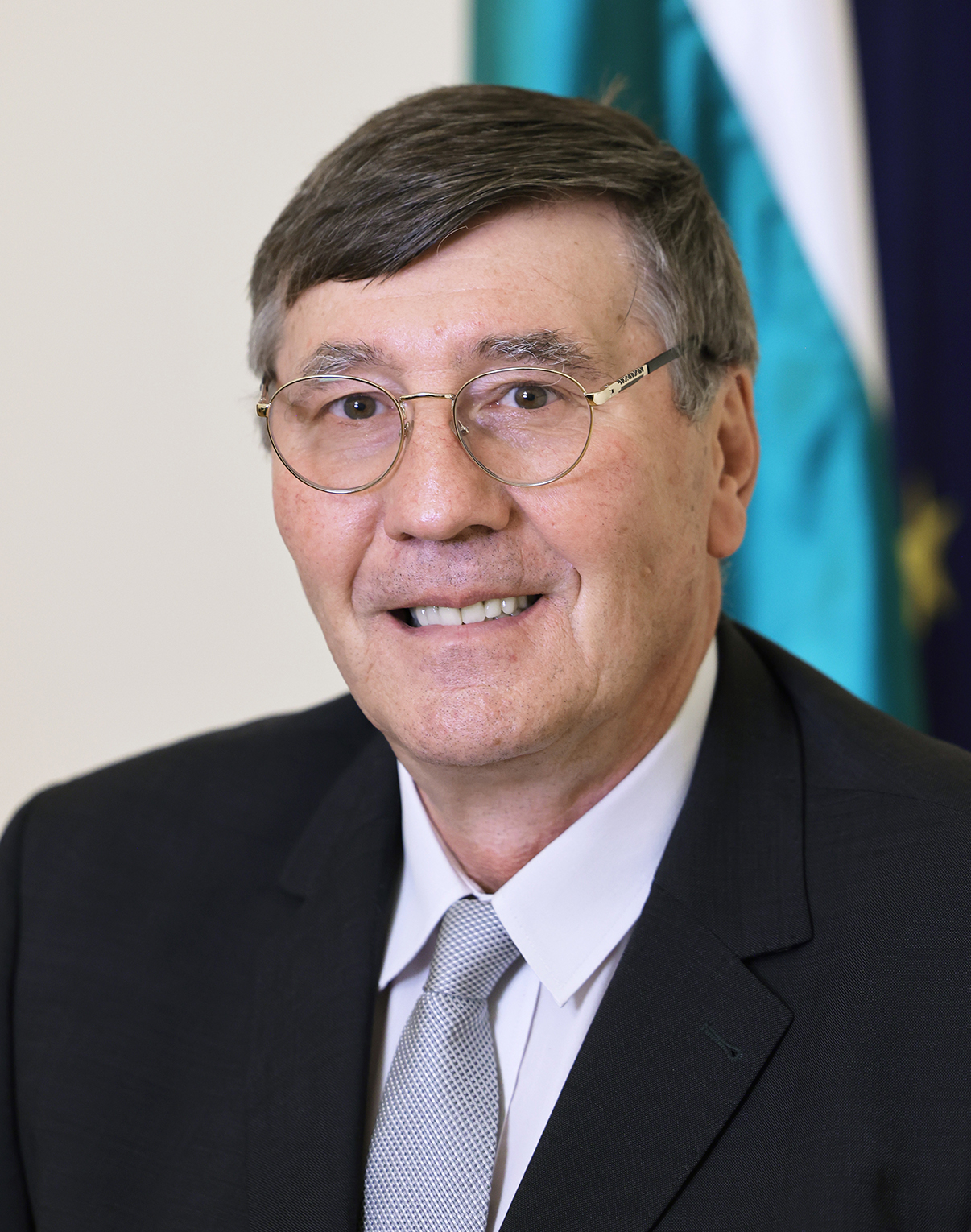
- Glouchkov in 2024

Personal information
- Born: 10 January 1960 (age 66) Tryavna, PR Bulgaria
- Listed height: 6 ft 8 in (2.03 m)
- Listed weight: 235 lb (107 kg)

Career information
- NBA draft: 1985: 7th round, 148th overall pick
- Drafted by: Phoenix Suns
- Playing career: 1976–1997
- Position: Power forward / center
- Number: 16

Career history
- 1976–1979: Yambol
- 1980–1981: CSKA Sofia
- 1981–1982: Levski Spartak
- 1983–1984: Balkan Botevgrad
- 1984–1985: Akademik Varna
- 1985–1986: Phoenix Suns
- 1986–1990: Juvecaserta Basket
- 1990–1991: Sidis Reggio Emilia
- 1991–1992: Akademik Varna
- 1993: Tau Cerámica
- 1993–1996: Akademik Varna
- 1996–1997: Fontanafredda Siena

Career highlights
- FIBA Balkans Selection (1991 I); Italian Cup winner (1988); Bulgarian League champion (1985); Bulgarian Cup winner (1981)
- Stats at NBA.com
- Stats at Basketball Reference
Medals
Men's basketball
Representing Bulgaria
European U-18 Championship
Bronze medal – third place	1980 Yugoslavia	Under-18

Georgi Nikolov Glouchkov (alternate spelling: Gueorgui) (Bulgarian: Георги Николов Глушков; born 10 January 1960) is a Bulgarian former professional basketball player and president of Bulgarian Basketball Federation. A 6 ft 8 in (204 cm) power forward-center, he was the first player from an Eastern bloc country to compete in the American National Basketball Association (NBA).

Glouchkov has served as Bulgaria's Minister of Youth and Sports under Prime Minister Dimitar Glavchev since 9 April 2024.

== Professional career ==
After one successful season with the Bulgarian club Luskov Yambol's junior side, Glouchkov got promoted to their senior side, by his junior coach, Simeon Varchev, at age 19. They also worked together in the Bulgarian clubs Balkan Botevgrad and Akademik Varna. By the mid-1980s, he had established a reputation as being one of Europe's top five players at the time. After averaging 23 points and 19 rebounds per game, during the Bulgarian National League's 1984–85 season, in which his team, Akademik Varna, won the Bulgarian National League championship, he attracted the attention of the Phoenix Suns, who selected him in the seventh round (with the 148th pick overall) of the 1985 NBA draft. The Suns signed him on 25 September 1985, releasing a special press kit which included a history of Bulgaria and a glossary of Bulgarian phrases.

Glouchkov knew very little English and was accompanied by Bozhidar Takev, a Bulgarian basketball coach and trainer, who translated for him. At the beginning of the season, Glouchkov, by way of his rebounding ability, became a regular member of the team's playing rotation; as the year went on, however, Glouchkov began gaining weight, and his productivity decreased. He ended the 1985-86 NBA season with averages of 4.9 points and 3.3 rebounds per game.

As the season concluded, Glouchkov began losing weight at a dramatic pace. When he reported to the Suns' 1986 summer league team, he weighed 25 pounds less than he had weighed when he first signed with the Suns. After a poor performance in summer league competition, the Suns advised him to return to Europe.

Glouchkov returned to his homeland. He continued to play professional basketball in various European national domestic leagues, including Italy's LBA, Bulgaria's NBL, and Spain's ACB. He had his most post-NBA success with the Italian club Phonola Caserta, whom he led to the FIBA European Cup Winners' Cup finals during the 1988–89 season, before losing to the Spanish Liga ACB club Real Madrid, in the finals. Glouchkov was a FIBA Balkans Selection in 1991.

== National team career ==
Glouchkov competed in his first tournament with the junior youth teams of Bulgaria, at age 17, when he played with the Bulgarian national cadets team at the 1977 FIBA European Championship for Cadets. Glouchkov was also a member of the senior men's Bulgarian national team. He represented Bulgaria's senior team at four FIBA EuroBasket tournaments. He played at the 1979 FIBA EuroBasket, the 1985 FIBA EuroBasket, the 1989 FIBA EuroBasket, and the 1991 FIBA EuroBasket.

== Career statistics ==
Legend
GP	Games played	GS	Games started	MPG	Minutes per game
FG%	Field goal percentage	3P%	3-point field goal percentage	FT%	Free throw percentage
RPG	Rebounds per game	APG	Assists per game	SPG	Steals per game
BPG	Blocks per game	PPG	Points per game	**Bold**	Career high

=== NBA ===
==== Regular season ====
Year	Team	GP	GS	MPG	FG%	3P%	FT%	RPG	APG	SPG	BPG	PPG
1985–86	Phoenix	49	16	15.8	.402	1.000	.574	3.3	.7	.5	.5	4.9

== Honours and titles ==
=== European competitions ===
- **FIBA European Cup Winners Cup**

Runner-up (1): 1988–89

- **FIBA Korać Cup**

Semifinalist (1): 1986–87

=== Domestic competitions ===
- **Italian League**

Runner-up (1): 1986–87

- **Italian Cup**

Winner (1): 1987–88
Runner-up (1): 1988–89

- **Bulgarian Championship**

Champion (1): 1984–85

- **Bulgarian Cup**

Winner (1): 1980–81
