= Roberto Brunamonti =

Italian basketball player (born 1959)

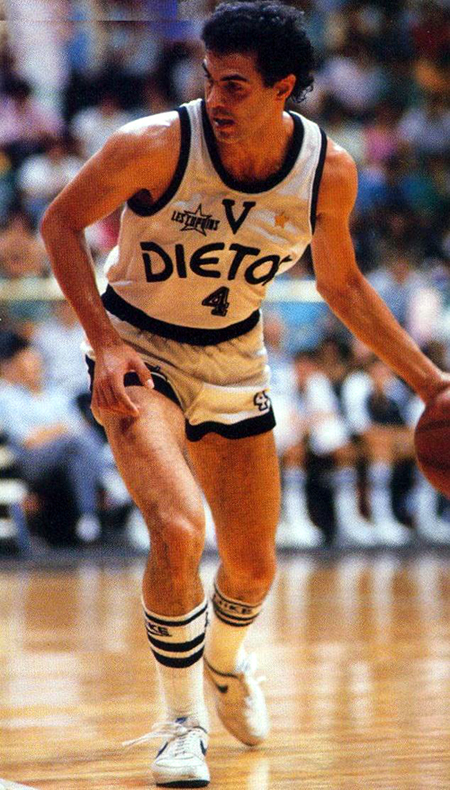
- Brunamonti with Virtus in the 1980s

Personal information
- Born: 14 April 1959 (age 67) Spoleto, Italy
- Listed height: 6 ft 3 in (1.91 m)
- Listed weight: 180 lb (82 kg)

Career information
- Playing career: 1975–1996
- Position: Point guard
- Number: 4

Career history

Playing
- 1975–1982: AMG Sebastiani Basket
- 1982–1996: Virtus Bologna

Coaching
- 1997: Virtus Bologna

Career highlights
- As a player: FIBA European Selection (1991); FIBA Saporta Cup champion (1990); FIBA Korać Cup champion (1980); 4× Italian League champion (1984, 1993, 1994, 1995); 3× Italian Cup winner (1984, 1989, 1990); Italian Supercup winner (1995); No. 4 retired by Virtus Bologna (1997); As a head coach: Italian Cup winner (1997)
Medals
Men's basketball
Representing Italy
Olympic Games
Silver medal – second place	1980 Moscow
FIBA EuroBasket
Gold medal – first place	1983 France
Bronze medal – third place	1985 West Germany
Silver medal – second place	1991 Italy

Roberto Brunamonti (born 14 April 1959) is an Italian professional basketball executive, and former player and coach. At a height of 191 cm (6 ft 3 in) tall, he played at the point guard position. During his pro club playing career, Brunamonti was a member of the FIBA European Selection Team in 1991. His number 4 playing jersey was retired, by the Italian League club Virtus Bologna, in 1997. Brunamonti was among the 105 player nominees for the 50 Greatest EuroLeague Contributors (2008) list.

== Professional career ==
Brunamonti started his career with AMG Sebastiani Basket Rieti, in 1975, and after seven years, joined Virtus Bologna in 1982. He played with Virtus Bologna, until he ended his career in 1996, after playing 21 years in the Italian basketball league.

During his professional club playing career, Brunamonti won four Italian League championships, in the years 1984, 1993, 1994, and 1995. He also won three Italian Cup titles, in the years 1984, 1989, and 1990), and one Italian Supercup title, in 1995.

== National team career ==
Brunamonti won the silver medal with the senior Italian national team, at the 1980 Moscow Summer Olympic Games. With Italy, he also won the gold medal at the 1983 FIBA EuroBasket, the bronze medal at the 1985 FIBA EuroBasket, and the silver medal at the 1991 FIBA EuroBasket.

Brunamonti also represented Italy at the following major FIBA tournaments: the 1979 FIBA EuroBasket, the 1981 FIBA EuroBasket, the 1984 Los Angeles Summer Olympic Games, the 1986 FIBA World Cup, the 1987 FIBA EuroBasket, the 1989 FIBA EuroBasket, and the 1990 FIBA World Cup.

== Coaching career ==
After his playing career ended, Brunamonti worked as a basketball coach. He was the head coach of the Italian League club Virtus Bologna. He won the Italian Cup title with the club in 1997.

== Managerial career ==
After working as a coach, Brunamonti moved on to front office managerial roles. He worked in the team management of the Italian League clubs Virtus Bologna and Virtus Roma. From 2008 to 2009, he was the technical director of Nuova AMG Sebastiani Basket Rieti.
