= FIBA EuroBasket 1991 qualification =

Qualification for the 1991 FIBA European Championship, commonly called FIBA EuroBasket 1991 took place between 9 May 1989 and 5 December 1990. A total of eight teams qualified for the tournament.

== Format ==
A total of 27 teams participated. Competition consisted of two stages:

- A Qualifying Round that consisted of nineteen teams divided into four round robin tournaments that took place in Oslo-Norway, Olomouc-Czechoslovakia, Osnabrück-Federal Republic of Germany and Anadia-Portugal between 9 May and 15 May 1989.
- A Challenge round where the first and second place teams from each of the four groups from the qualifying round joined another eight teams. All sixteen teams were then divided into four round-robin groups, each consisting of four teams. This stage took place between 22 November 1989, and 5 December 1990, with the competition consisting of home and away legs taking place in each of the participating countries. The top two teams from each group qualified for EuroBasket 1991.

== Qualifying round ==
Qualified for the challenge round

=== Group A (Oslo, Norway) ===
Team	Pld	W	L	PF	PA	PD	Pts	Tie
Sweden	4	4	0	374	281	+93	8	
England	4	3	1	312	279	+33	7	
Norway	4	1	3	295	301	−6	5	1–1, +7
Switzerland	4	1	3	277	332	−55	5	1–1, 0
Denmark	4	1	3	268	333	−65	5	1–1, -7

Rules=1) Points; 2) Head-to-head results; 3) Points difference; 4) Points scored.

9 May 1989

Denmark	55–74	England
Scoring by half: 31–30, 24–44

Oslo, Norway

9 May 1989

Norway	65–66	Switzerland
Scoring by half: 42–31, 23–35

Oslo

10 May 1989

Denmark	77–85	Norway
Scoring by half: 36–46, 41–39

Oslo

10 May 1989

England	78–92	Sweden
Scoring by half: 38–47, 40–45

Oslo

11 May 1989

Denmark	57–96	Sweden
Scoring by half: 28–40, 29–56

Oslo

11 May 1989

England	86–68	Switzerland
Scoring by half: 47–29, 39–39

Oslo

12 May 1989

England	74–64	Norway
Scoring by half: 29–38, 45–26

Oslo

12 May 1989

Sweden	102–65	Switzerland
Scoring by half: 50–30, 52–35

Oslo

13 May 1989

Denmark	79–78	Switzerland
Scoring by half: 37–31, 42–47

Oslo

13 May 1989

Norway	81–84	Sweden
Scoring by half: 43–45, 38–39

Oslo

=== Group B (Olomouc - Czechoslovakia) ===
Team	Pld	W	L	PF	PA	PD	Pts
Czechoslovakia	3	3	0	327	229	+98	6
Romania	3	2	1	221	246	−25	5
Austria	3	1	2	229	265	−36	4
Finland	3	0	3	235	272	−37	3

10 May 1989

Austria	84–83	Finland
Scoring by half: 41–35, 43–48

Olomouc, Czechoslovakia

10 May 1989

Czechoslovakia	107–71	Romania
Scoring by half: 61–46, 46–25

Olomouc

11 May 1989

Finland	69–74	Romania
Scoring by half: 29–34, 40–40

Olomouc

11 May 1989

Austria	75–106	Czechoslovakia
Scoring by half: 35–56, 40–50

Olomouc

12 May 1989

Romania	76–70	Austria
Scoring by half: 42–32, 34–38

Olomouc

12 May 1989

Czechoslovakia	114–83	Finland
Scoring by half: 61–37, 53–46

Olomouc

=== Group C (Osnabrück - Federal Republic of Germany) ===
Team	Pld	W	L	PF	PA	PD	Pts
West Germany	4	4	0	413	278	+135	8
Poland	4	3	1	377	326	+51	7
Turkey	4	2	2	349	300	+49	6
Albania	4	1	3	347	394	−47	5
Scotland	4	0	4	268	456	−188	4

11 May 1989

West Germany	127–53	Scotland
Scoring by half: 63–29, 64–24

Osnabrück, Federal Republic of Germany

11 May 1989

Turkey	68–69	Poland
Scoring by half: 43–40, 25–29

Osnabrück

12 May 1989

Albania	101–82	Scotland
Scoring by half: 49–34, 52–48

Osnabrück

12 May 1989

West Germany	82–70	Turkey
Scoring by half: 45–37, 37–33

Osnabrück

13 May 1989

Turkey	105–61	Scotland
Scoring by half: 51–30, 54–31

Osnabrück

13 May 1989

Poland	103–85	Albania
Scoring by half: 54–46, 49–39

Osnabrück

14 May 1989

Poland	123–72	Scotland
Scoring by half: 72–39, 51–33

Osnabrück

14 May 1989

West Germany	103–73	Albania
Scoring by half: 57–22, 46–51

Osnabrück

15 May 1989

Turkey	106–88	Albania
Scoring by half: 54–55, 52–33

Osnabrück

15 May 1989

West Germany	101–82	Poland
Scoring by half: 51–41, 50–41

Osnabrück

=== Group D (Anadia - Portugal) ===
Team	Pld	W	L	PF	PA	PD	Pts
Belgium	4	4	0	368	266	+102	8
Israel	4	3	1	387	314	+73	7
Portugal	4	2	2	359	338	+21	6
Hungary	4	1	3	297	339	−42	5
Iceland	4	0	4	299	453	−154	4

11 May 1989

Iceland	76–116	Portugal
Scoring by half: 32–52, 44–64

Anadia, Portugal

11 May 1989

Belgium	79–71	Israel
Scoring by half: 48–34, 31–37

Anadia

12 May 1989

Hungary	72–85	Portugal
Scoring by half: 39–40, 33–45

Anadia

12 May 1989

Belgium	130–59	Iceland
Scoring by half: 63–24, 67–35

Anadia

13 May 1989

Hungary	64–73	Belgium
Scoring by half: 31–44, 33–29

Anadia

13 May 1989

Israel	113–82	Iceland
Scoring by half: 57–43, 56–39

Anadia

14 May 1989

Portugal	72–86	Belgium
Scoring by half: 42–51, 30–35

Anadia

14 May 1989

Israel	99–67	Hungary
Scoring by half: 56–39, 43–28

Anadia

15 May 1989

Iceland	82–94	Hungary
Scoring by half: 38–36, 44–58

Anadia

15 May 1989

Portugal	86–104	Israel
Scoring by half: 37–53, 49–51

Anadia

== Challenge round ==
Qualified for EuroBasket 1991

=== Group A ===
Team	Pld	W	L	PF	PA	PD	Pts
Greece	6	5	1	551	474	+77	11
Bulgaria	6	4	2	500	490	+10	10
Sweden	6	3	3	482	500	−18	9
Romania	6	0	6	476	545	−69	6

Sweden	86–100	Greece
Scoring by half: 54–50, 32–50

Romania	76–98	Bulgaria
Scoring by half: 33–56, 43–42

Bulgaria	69–81	Sweden
Scoring by half: 28–38, 41–43

Greece	97–77	Romania
Scoring by half: 45–41, 52–36

Sweden	85–81	Romania
Scoring by half: 45–47, 40–34

Bulgaria	84–78	Greece
Scoring by half: 39–44, 45–34

Greece	81–68	Sweden
Scoring by half: 39–32, 42–36

Bulgaria	87–76	Romania
Scoring by half: 45–42, 42–34

Sweden	67–83	Bulgaria
Scoring by half: 37–42, 30–41

Romania	80–83 (OT)	Greece
Scoring by half: 36–41, 39–34 Overtime: 5–8

Romania	86–95	Sweden
Scoring by half: 43–38, 43–57

Greece	112–79	Bulgaria
Scoring by half: 58–37, 54–42

=== Group B ===
Team	Pld	W	L	PF	PA	PD	Pts	Tie
Italy	6	5	1	588	461	+127	11	
Poland	6	3	3	488	526	−38	9	
Netherlands	6	2	4	500	523	−23	8	1-1, +12
Belgium	6	2	4	458	524	−66	8	1-1, -12

Rules=1) Points; 2) Head-to-head results; 3) Points difference; 4) Points scored.

Belgium	79–97	Italy
Scoring by half: 45–44, 34–53

Poland	71–101	Netherlands
Scoring by half: 30–53, 41–48

Netherlands	87–71	Belgium
Scoring by half: 47–30, 40–41

Italy	106–75	Poland
Scoring by half: 53–30, 53–45

Belgium	96–80	Poland
Scoring by half: 46–30, 50–50

Netherlands	83–84	Italy
Scoring by half: 44–43, 39–41

Italy	94–55	Belgium
Scoring by half: 47–20, 47–35

Netherlands	70–86	Poland
Scoring by half: 32–41, 38–45

Belgium	85–81	Netherlands
Scoring by half: 43–39, 42–42

Poland	91–81	Italy
Scoring by half: 34–39, 57–42

Poland	85–72	Belgium
Scoring by half: 42–32, 43–40

Italy	126–78	Netherlands
Scoring by half: 70–34, 56–44

=== Group C ===
Team	Pld	W	L	PF	PA	PD	Pts
Yugoslavia	6	6	0	628	494	+134	12
Spain	6	4	2	528	507	+21	10
Germany	6	2	4	495	550	−55	8
England	6	0	6	480	580	−100	6

Rules=1) Points; 2) Head-to-head results; 3) Points difference; 4) Points scored.

After the reunification of Germany on 3 October 1990, the former Federal Republic of Germany is renamed Germany before the second leg.

West Germany	75–111	Yugoslavia
Scoring by half: 36–56, 39–55

22 Nov 1989
20:00

England	83–99	Spain
Scoring by half: 40–57, 43–42
Pts: Clark 27		Pts: Villacampa 22

Aston Event Center, Birmingham
Referees: Simon Mottart (BEL), Henk Kleersnijder (NED)

25 Nov 1989
18:00

Spain	75–64	West Germany
Scoring by half: 28–32, 47–32
Pts: Martín 22		Pts: Jackel 20

Palacio de lo Deportes, Palma de Mallorca
Attendance: 6.000
Referees: Kostas Rigas (GRE), Christian Altmeyer (FRA)

Yugoslavia	108–85	England
Scoring by half: 52–41, 56–44

West Germany	110–87	England
Scoring by half: 50–41, 60–46

29 Nov 1989
19:00

Spain	97–108	Yugoslavia
Scoring by half: 44–60, 53–58
Pts: Villacampa 30		Pts: Kukoč 34

Palacio de lo Deportes, Palma de Mallorca
Attendance: 6.000
Referees: Wieslaw Zych (POL), Vittorio Fiorito (ITA)

Yugoslavia	120–87	Germany
Scoring by half: 70–30, 50–57

28 Nov 1990
19:00

Spain	96–79	England
Scoring by half: 51–45, 45–34
Pts: Jiménez 22		Pts: Obaseki 23

Palacio Municipal de Deportes, Murcia
Referees: Pierre Brys (BEL), Rui Valente (POR)

1 Dec 1990
20:00

Germany	78–79	Spain
Scoring by half: 31–35, 47–44
Pts: Harnisch 25		Pts: Villacampa 20

Hanns-Martin-Schleyer-Halle, Stuttgart
Referees: Mikhail Davidov (URS), Bruno Duranti (ITA)

England	68–86	Yugoslavia
Scoring by half: 35–42, 33–44

England	78–81	Germany
Scoring by half: 43–46, 35–35

5 Dec 1990
20:30

Yugoslavia	95–82	Spain
Scoring by half: 53–44, 42–38
Pts: Perasović 21		Pts: Biriukov 23

Sportska Dvorana “Mejdan”, Tuzla
Referees: Philippe Mailhabiau (FRA), Athanasios Giochalis (GRE)

=== Group D ===
Team	Pld	W	L	PF	PA	PD	Pts	Tie
France	6	4	2	565	531	+34	10	
Czechoslovakia	6	3	3	528	531	−3	9	1-1, +6
Soviet Union	6	3	3	506	476	+30	9	1-1, -6
Israel	6	2	4	477	538	−61	8	

Czechoslovakia	85–76	Soviet Union
Scoring by half: 39–35, 46–41

Israel	99–93	France
Scoring by half: 55–46, 44–47

France	93–72	Czechoslovakia
Scoring by half: 43–35, 50–37

Soviet Union	93–61	Israel
Scoring by half: 48–29, 45–32

Czechoslovakia	93–81	Israel
Scoring by half: 51–38, 42–43

France	86–96	Soviet Union
Scoring by half: 44–50, 42–46

Soviet Union	83–80	Czechoslovakia
Scoring by half: 43–45, 40–35

France	93–74	Israel
Scoring by half: 43–32, 50–42

Czechoslovakia	106–115	France
Scoring by half: 63–44, 43–71

Israel	79–74	Soviet Union
Scoring by half: 46–38, 33–36

Israel	83–92	Czechoslovakia
Scoring by half: 40–44, 43–48

Soviet Union	84–85	France
Scoring by half: 44–44, 40–41
