= Kostas Politis =

Greek basketball player and coach

Personal information
- Born: 21 March 1942 Athens, Greece
- Died: 18 June 2018 (aged 76) Athens, Greece
- Listed height: 6 ft 1.75 in (1.87 m)
- Listed weight: 190 lb (86 kg)

Career information
- Playing career: 1963–1971
- Position: Point guard
- Coaching career: 1978–1999

Career history

Playing
- 1963–1971: Panathinaikos

Coaching
- 1978–1982: Panathinaikos
- 1982–1987: Greece
- 1989–1990: PAOK
- 1993–1994: Panathinaikos
- 1999: AEK Athens

Career highlights
- As a player: 3× Greek League champion (1967, 1969, 1971); As a head coach: FIBA Balkans Selection (1991 I); 3× Greek League champion (1980–1982); 2× Greek Cup winner (1979, 1982)
Medals
Men's basketball
Head coach for Greece
EuroBasket
Gold medal – first place	1987 Greece

Konstantinos "Kostas" Politis (Greek: Κωνσταντίνος "Κώστας" Πολίτης; 21 March 1942 – 18 June 2018) was a Greek professional basketball player and coach.

== Career as a player ==
=== Club career ===
Politis played with Panathinaikos, and they won 3 Greek League championships, in 1967, 1969, and 1971. In the 1968–69 season, he was a FIBA European Cup Winners' Cup semifinalist.

=== National team career ===
Politis also played with the Greece men's national basketball team at the EuroBasket 1961, the EuroBasket 1965, the EuroBasket 1967, and at the 1967 Mediterranean Games.

== Career as a coach ==
=== Club coaching career ===
Politis was the head coach of Panathinaikos, and they won 3 Greek League championships (1980, 1981, and 1982), and 2 Greek Cups (1979 and 1982). He was also a 2 time Greek Cup finalist (1989 and 1990) while coaching PAOK.

Politis was the head coach of the FIBA Balkans Selection in 1991. In the 1993–94 season, when he was coaching Panathinaikos, he was a FIBA European League semifinalist, and his team finished in 3rd place at the 1994 FIBA European League Final Four at Tel Aviv. In 1999, Politis was a Greek Cup finalist, while coaching AEK Athens.

=== National team coaching career ===
Politis was the head coach of the Greece men's national basketball team that won the gold medal at the EuroBasket 1987. He coached the Greece national team at the EuroBasket 1983, and the 1986 FIBA World Championship.

== See also ==
- List of FIBA EuroBasket winning head coaches
