= EuroBasket 1987 =

International basketball event

Ευρωμπάσκετ 1987

Tournament details
- Host country: Greece
- City: Piraeus
- Dates: 3–14 June
- Teams: 12
- Venue: 1 (in 1 host city)

Final positions
- Champions: Greece (1st title)
- Runners-up: Soviet Union
- Third place: Yugoslavia
- Fourth place: Spain

Tournament statistics
- Games played: 46
- MVP: (Greece) Nikos Galis
- Top scorer: (Greece) Nikos Galis (37.0 points per game)

The 1987 FIBA European Championship, commonly called FIBA EuroBasket 1987, was the 25th FIBA EuroBasket regional basketball championship, held by FIBA Europe. It was held in Greece between 3 and 14 June 1987. Twelve national teams entered the event under the auspices of FIBA Europe, the sport's regional governing body. The Peace and Friendship Stadium, located in the Neo Faliron in Piraeus, Attica, was the hosting venue of the tournament. The host, Greece, won its first FIBA European title by defeating the defending champions and heavily favored Soviet Union, with a 103–101 score in a gripping final decided in overtime. Greece's Nikos Galis was voted the tournament's MVP.

== Venues ==
All games were played at the Peace and Friendship Stadium in Piraeus, Attica.

EuroBasket 1987 is located in Greece	Peace and Friendship Stadium; Capacity: 17,000; Opened in 1983

== Qualification ==
A total of twelve teams qualified for the tournament. To the top seven teams from the previous tournament, four more teams were granted berths via a qualifying tournament. Greece qualified as hosts of the tournament.

- Hosts:
  - Greece
- Top seven teams from Eurobasket 1985:
  - Czechoslovakia
  - France
  - Italy
  - Soviet Union
  - Spain
  - West Germany
  - Yugoslavia
- Top four teams from the qualifying stage:
  - Israel
  - Netherlands
  - Poland
  - Romania

== Format ==
- The teams were split in two groups of six teams each. The top four teams from each group advance to the quarterfinals. The winners in the knockout semifinals advance to the Final, and the losers figure in a third-place playoff.
- The losers from the quarterfinals stage compete in a separate bracket to define places 5th through 8th in the final standings.
- The fifth and sixth teams from each group competed in another bracket to define places 9th through 12th in the final standings.

== Preliminary round ==
Qualified for the semifinals

=== Group A ===
Times given below are in Eastern European Summer Time (UTC+3).

Team	Pld	W	L	PF	PA	PD	Pts
Soviet Union	5	5	0	501	399	+102	10
Yugoslavia	5	3	2	473	421	+52	8
Spain	5	3	2	497	455	+42	8
Greece	5	3	2	430	399	+31	8
France	5	1	4	395	471	−76	6
Romania	5	0	5	410	561	−151	5

3 June
14:30

Boxscore

Spain	111–70	France
Scoring by half: 48–34, 63–36
Pts: San Epifanio 34		Pts: Dubuisson 17

Peace and Friendship Stadium, Piraeus, Athens
Referees: Paul Housman (USA), Wieslaw Zych (POL)

3 June
20:00

Boxscore

Romania	77–109	Greece
Scoring by half: 46–60, 28–49
Pts: Brănișteanu 14		Pts: Galis 44

Peace and Friendship Stadium, Piraeus, Athens
Attendance: 8,000
Referees: Lubomir Kotleba (TCH), Peter George (FRG)

3 June
22:00

Boxscore

Yugoslavia	93–100	Soviet Union
Scoring by half: 41–44, 52–56
Pts: D. Petrović 26		Pts: Marčiulionis 18

Peace and Friendship Stadium, Piraeus, Athens
Referees: Stavros Douvis (GRE), Todd Warnick (ISR)

4 June
12:00

Boxscore

Romania	98–116	Spain
Scoring by half: 51–70, 47–46
Pts: Niculescu 19		Pts: Jiménez 24

Peace and Friendship Stadium, Piraeus, Athens
Referees: Alan Richardson (ENG), Richard Steeves (CAN)

4 June
17:00

Boxscore

Soviet Union	107–78	France
Scoring by half: 55–37, 52–41
Pts: Valters 22		Pts: Hufnagel, Ostrowski 18

Peace and Friendship Stadium, Piraeus, Athens
Referees: Maurizio Martolini (ITA), Jan Van Rennen (NED)

4 June
22:00

Boxscore

Yugoslavia	78–84	Greece
Scoring by half: 49–42, 29–42
Pts: Paspalj 24		Pts: Galis 44

Peace and Friendship Stadium, Piraeus, Athens
Attendance: 17,000
Referees: Wieslaw Zych (POL), Paul Housman (USA)

5 June
10:00

Boxscore

Soviet Union	121–74	Romania
Scoring by half: 66–29, 55–45
Pts: Valters 23		Pts: Brănișteanu 20

Peace and Friendship Stadium, Piraeus, Athens
Referees: Jan Van Rennen (NED), Peter George (FRG)

5 June
20:00

Boxscore

Greece	89–106	Spain
Scoring by half: 38–55, 51–51
Pts: Galis 35		Pts: Jiménez 28

Peace and Friendship Stadium, Piraeus, Athens
Attendance: 16,000
Referees: Richard Steeves (CAN), Todd Warnick (ISR)

5 June
22:00

Boxscore

Yugoslavia	88–83	France
Scoring by half: 50–46, 38–37
Pts: D. Petrović 34		Pts: Ostrowski 20

Peace and Friendship Stadium, Piraeus, Athens
Referees: Lubomir Kotleba (TCH), Alan Richardson (ENG)

6 June
15:00

Boxscore

France	95–83	Romania
Scoring by half: 46–47, 49–36
Pts: Ostrowski 25		Pts: Ermurache 30

Peace and Friendship Stadium, Piraeus, Athens
Referees: Wieslaw Zych (POL), Todd Warnick (ISR)

6 June
17:00

Boxscore

Yugoslavia	94–76	Spain
Scoring by half: 54–36, 40–40
Pts: D. Petrović 26		Pts: San Epifanio, Solozábal 20

Peace and Friendship Stadium, Piraeus, Athens
Referees: Maurizio Martolini (ITA), Paul Housman (USA)

6 June
22:00

Boxscore

Greece	66–69	Soviet Union
Scoring by half: 37–30, 29–39
Pts: Galis 31		Pts: Marčiulionis 22

Peace and Friendship Stadium, Piraeus, Athens
Referees: Lubomir Kotleba (TCH), Alan Richardson (ENG)

7 June
10:00

Boxscore

Yugoslavia	120–78	Romania
Scoring by half: 69–43, 51–35
Pts: Divac 25		Pts: Cernat 19

Peace and Friendship Stadium, Piraeus, Athens
Referees: Peter George (FRG), Jan Van Rennen (NED)

7 June
17:00

Boxscore

Spain	88–104	Soviet Union
Scoring by half: 51–45, 37–59
Pts: Jiménez 20		Pts: Marčiulionis, Tikhonenko 22

Peace and Friendship Stadium, Piraeus, Athens
Referees: Wieslaw Zych (POL), Richard Steeves (CAN)

7 June
22:00

Boxscore

France	69–82	Greece
Scoring by half: 38–38, 31–44
Pts: Dacoury 15		Pts: Galis 34

Peace and Friendship Stadium, Piraeus, Athens
Referees: Paul Housman (USA), Georgy Avalishvili (URS)

=== Group B ===
Team	Pld	W	L	PF	PA	PD	Pts
Italy	5	5	0	467	379	+88	10
West Germany	5	3	2	428	447	−19	8
Poland	5	3	2	432	434	−2	8
Czechoslovakia	5	2	3	436	437	−1	7
Netherlands	5	1	4	380	430	−50	6
Israel	5	1	4	422	438	−16	6

3 June
10:00

Boxscore

Israel	99–83	Czechoslovakia
Scoring by half: 44–40, 55–43
Pts: Jamchi 37		Pts: Kropilák 20

Peace and Friendship Stadium, Piraeus, Athens
Attendance: 1,000
Referees: Yvan Mainini (FRA), Philippe Leemann (SUI)

3 June
12:00

Boxscore

Poland	91–84	Netherlands
Scoring by half: 41–45, 50–39
Pts: Zelig 29		Pts: Smits 31

Peace and Friendship Stadium, Piraeus, Athens
Referees: Richard Steeves (CAN), Vicente Sanchís (ESP)

3 June
16:30

Boxscore

Italy	84–78	West Germany
Scoring by half: 46–38, 38–40
Pts: Riva 28		Pts: Jackel 31

Peace and Friendship Stadium, Piraeus, Athens
Referees: Kostas Rigas (GRE), Alan Richardson (ENG)

4 June
10:00

Boxscore

Israel	60–61	Netherlands
Scoring by half: 24–43, 36–18
Pts: Jamchi 36		Pts: Smits 20

Peace and Friendship Stadium, Piraeus, Athens
Referees: Kostas Rigas (GRE), George Chiraleu (ROU)

4 June
15:00

Boxscore

Poland	85–99	Italy
Scoring by half: 44–54, 41–48
Pts: Zelig 26		Pts: Riva 29

Peace and Friendship Stadium, Piraeus, Athens
Referees: Radoslav Petrović (YUG), Philippe Leemann (SUI)

4 June
20:00

Boxscore

Czechoslovakia	95–72	West Germany
Scoring by half: 48–31, 47–41
Pts: Kropilák 24		Pts: Jackel, Welp 14

Peace and Friendship Stadium, Piraeus, Athens
Referees: Yvan Mainini (FRA), Georgy Avalishvili (URS)

5 June
12:00

Boxscore

Netherlands	71–95	Italy
Scoring by half: 33–43, 38–52
Pts: te Velde 16		Pts: Riva 18

Peace and Friendship Stadium, Piraeus, Athens
Referees: Yvan Mainini (FRA), Georgy Avalishvili (URS)

5 June
14:00

Boxscore

Israel	107–112 (OT)	West Germany
Scoring by half: 40–49, 58–49 Overtime: 9–14
Pts: LaVon Mercer 28		Pts: Jackel 40

Peace and Friendship Stadium, Piraeus
Referees: Radoslav Petrović (YUG), Vicente Sanchís (ESP)

5 June
17:00

Boxscore

Czechoslovakia	84–87	Poland
Scoring by half: 46–49, 38–38
Pts: Kropilák 20		Pts: Zelig 30

Peace and Friendship Stadium, Piraeus, Athens
Referees: Stavros Douvis (GRE), Paul Housman (USA)

6 June
10:00

Boxscore

West Germany	90–86	Poland
Scoring by half: 43–48, 47–38
Pts: Jackel, Welp 25		Pts: Zelig 27

Peace and Friendship Stadium, Piraeus, Athens
Referees: Kostas Rigas (GRE), Richard Steeves (CAN)

6 June
12:00

Boxscore

Netherlands	89–108	Czechoslovakia
Scoring by half: 40–48, 49–60
Pts: Smits 30		Pts: Jelínek 26

Peace and Friendship Stadium, Piraeus, Athens
Referees: Radoslav Petrović (YUG), Vicente Sanchís (ESP)

6 June
20:00

Boxscore

Israel	79–99	Italy
Scoring by half: 41–56, 38–43
Pts: Jamchi 34		Pts: Riva 20

Peace and Friendship Stadium, Piraeus, Athens
Referees: Stavros Douvis (GRE), Philippe Leemann (SUI)

7 June
12:00

Boxscore

West Germany	76–75	Netherlands
Scoring by half: 36–45, 40–30
Pts: Jackel 27		Pts: Smits 23

Peace and Friendship Stadium, Piraeus, Athens
Referees: Stavros Douvis (GRE), Philippe Leemann (SUI)

7 June
15:00

Boxscore

Israel	77–83	Poland
Scoring by half: 45–43, 32–40
Pts: Jamchi 24		Pts: Zelig 31

Peace and Friendship Stadium, Piraeus, Athens
Referees: Alan Richardson (ENG), Vicente Sanchís (ESP)

7 June
20:00

Boxscore

Italy	90–66	Czechoslovakia
Scoring by half: 48–40, 42–26
Pts: Riva 32		Pts: Okáč 14

Peace and Friendship Stadium, Piraeus, Athens
Referees: Kostas Rigas (GRE), Yvan Mainini (FRA)

== Knockout stage ==
=== Championship bracket ===
Quarter-finals
9 June – 19:30
Soviet Union	110
Czechoslovakia	91
9 June – 21:30
Spain	107
West Germany	77
10 June – 19:30
Italy	78
Greece	90
10 June – 21:30
Poland	81
Yugoslavia	128

Semi-finals
12 June – 19:30
Soviet Union	113
Spain	96
12 June – 21:30
Greece	81
Yugoslavia	77

Final
14 June – 20:00
Soviet Union	101
Greece	103
Third place
13 June – 21:30
Spain	87
Yugoslavia	98

==== Quarterfinals ====
9 June
19:30

Boxscore

Soviet Union	110–91	Czechoslovakia
Scoring by half: 55–51, 55–40
Pts: Volkov 25		Pts: Havlík 26

Peace and Friendship Stadium, Piraeus, Athens.
Referees: Todd Warnick (ISR), Philippe Leemann (SUI)

9 June
21:30

Boxscore

Spain	107–77	West Germany
Scoring by half: 56–34, 51–43
Pts: San Epifanio 33		Pts: Jackel 14

Peace and Friendship Stadium, Piraeus, Athens
Referees: Wieslaw Zych (POL), Alan Richardson (ENG)

10 June
19:30

Boxscore

Italy	78–90	Greece
Scoring by half: 35–49, 43–41
Pts: Riva 23		Pts: Galis 38

Peace and Friendship Stadium, Piraeus, Athens
Attendance: 16,000
Referees: Richard Steeves (CAN), Yvan Mainini (FRA)

10 June
21:30

Boxscore

Poland	81–128	Yugoslavia
Scoring by half: 33–58, 48–70
Pts: Zelig 15		Pts: Grbović 24

Peace and Friendship Stadium, Piraeus, Athens
Referees: Lubomir Kotleba (TCH), Paul Housman (USA)

==== Semifinals ====
12 June
19:30

Boxscore

Soviet Union	113–96	Spain
Scoring by half: 55–47, 58–49
Pts: Marčiulionis 26		Pts: Jiménez 30

Peace and Friendship Stadium, Piraeus, Athens
Referees: Richard Steeves (CAN), Lubomir Kotleba (TCH)

12 June
21:30

Boxscore

Greece	81–77	Yugoslavia
Scoring by half: 35–45, 46–32
Pts: Galis 30		Pts: D. Petrović 22

Peace and Friendship Stadium, Piraeus, Athens
Attendance: 18,000
Referees: Yvan Mainini (FRA), Todd Warnick (ISR)

==== Third place ====
13 June
21:30

Boxscore

Spain	87–98	Yugoslavia
Scoring by half: 51–42, 36–56
Pts: Romay, San Epifanio 17		Pts: D. Petrović 31

Peace and Friendship Stadium, Piraeus, Athens
Referees: Costas Rigas (GRE), Peter George (FRG)

==== Final ====
14 June
20:00

Boxscore

Soviet Union	101–103 (OT)	Greece
Scoring by half: 41–42, 48–47 Overtime: 12–14
Pts: Valters 21		Pts: Galis 40

Peace and Friendship Stadium, Piraeus, Athens
Attendance: 17,000
Referees: Richard Steeves (CAN), Vicente Sanchís (ESP)

=== 5th to 8th place ===
Classification round
11 June – 19:30
Czechoslovakia	91
West Germany	93
11 June – 21:30
Italy	93
Poland	75

Fifth place
14 June – 18:00
West Germany	84
Italy	87
Seventh place
13 June – 19:30
Czechoslovakia	92
Poland	96

11 June
19:30

Boxscore

Czechoslovakia	91–93	West Germany
Scoring by half: 44–50, 47–43
Pts: Kropilák 19		Pts: Jackel 23

Peace and Friendship Stadium, Piraeus, Athens
Referees: Georgy Avalishvili (URS), Jan Van Renen (NED)

11 June
21:30

Boxscore

Italy	93–75	Poland
Scoring by half: 44–32, 49–43
Pts: Morandotti 22		Pts: Zelig 20

Peace and Friendship Stadium, Piraeus, Athens
Referees: Stavros Douvis (GRE), Vicente Sanchís (ESP)

13 June
19:30

Boxscore

Czechoslovakia	92–96	Poland
Scoring by half: 52–45, 40–51
Pts: Matický 18		Pts: Zelig 33

Peace and Friendship Stadium, Piraeus, Athens
Referees: Stavros Douvis (GRE), Philippe Leemann (SUI)

14 June
18:00

Boxscore

West Germany	84–87	Italy
Scoring by half: 44–51, 40–36
Pts: Welp 17		Pts: Riva 26

Peace and Friendship Stadium, Piraeus, Athens
Referees: Stavros Douvis (GRE), Wieslaw Zych (POL)

=== 9th to 12th place ===
Classification round
9 June – 17:30
France	96
Israel	93
10 June – 17:30
Romania	87
Netherlands	88

Ninth place
13 June – 17:30
France	94
Netherlands	80
Eleventh place
11 June – 17:30
Israel	97
Romania	87

9 June
17:30

Boxscore

France	96–93	Israel
Scoring by half: 44–50, 52–43
Pts: Dubuisson 36		Pts: LaVon Mercer 34

Peace and Friendship Stadium, Piraeus, Athens
Referees: Costas Rigas (GRE), George Chiraleu (ROU)

10 June
17:30

Boxscore

Romania	87–88	Netherlands
Scoring by half: 35–55, 52–33
Pts: Niculescu 29		Pts: Smits 36

Peace and Friendship Stadium, Piraeus, Athens
Referees: Alan Richardson (ENG), Radoslav Petrović (YUG)

11 June
17:30

Boxscore

Israel	97–87	Romania
Scoring by half: 49–43, 48–44
Pts: Jamchi 44		Pts: Niculescu 20

Peace and Friendship Stadium, Piraeus, Athens
Referees: Maurizio Martolini (ITA), Peter George (FRG)

13 June
17:30

Boxscore

France	94–80	Netherlands
Scoring by half: 43–53, 51–27
Pts: Ostrowski 25		Pts: Kuipers 27

Peace and Friendship Stadium, Piraeus, Athens
Referees: Paul Housman (USA), Maurizio Martolini (ITA)

== Awards ==
1987 FIBA EuroBasket champions

Greece
1st title

1987 FIBA EuroBasket MVP: Nikos Galis ( Greece)

All-Tournament Team
(Soviet Union) Šarūnas Marčiulionis
(Greece) Nikos Galis (MVP)
(Soviet Union) Alexander Volkov
(Spain) Andrés Jiménez
(Greece) Panagiotis Fasoulas

== Final standings ==
Qualified for the 1988 European Olympic Qualifying Tournament

Rank	Team	Record
1st place, gold medalist(s)	Greece	6–2
2nd place, silver medalist(s)	Soviet Union	7–1
3rd place, bronze medalist(s)	Yugoslavia	5–3
4	Spain	4–4
5	Italy	7–1
6	West Germany	4–4
7	Poland	4–4
8	Czechoslovakia	2–6
9	France	3–4
10	Netherlands	2–5
11	Israel	2–5
12	Romania	0–7

Gold medal	Silver medal	Bronze medal	4th
Greece Nikos Galis; Nikos Stavropoulos; Panagiotis Giannakis; Argiris Kambouris; Nikos Linardos; Panagiotis Karatzas; Michalis Romanidis; Nikos Filippou; Liveris Andritsos; Panagiotis Fasoulas; Memos Ioannou; Fanis Christodoulou	Soviet Union Alexander Volkov; Heino Enden; Sergei Tarakanov; Valdemaras Chomičius; Sergei Babenko; Valeri Tikhonenko; Valdis Valters; Vladimir Tkachenko; Šarūnas Marčiulionis; Sergejus Jovaiša; Viktor Pankrashkin; Valery Goborov	Yugoslavia Dražen Petrović; Aleksandar Petrović; Aleksandar Đorđević; Toni Kukoč; Žarko Paspalj; Goran Grbović; Zoran Radović; Stojko Vranković; Ratko Radovanović; Vlade Divac; Dino Rađa; Danko Cvjetićanin	Spain Jordi Villacampa; Francisco Zapata; Cándido Sibilio; Josep María Margall; Andrés Jiménez; Fernando Romay; José Antonio Montero; Fernando Arcega; Ignacio Solozábal; Ferrán Martínez; José Ángel Arcega; Juan Antonio San Epifanio
