= 1990 FIBA European Champions Cup Final Four =

Basketball tournament

Tournament details
- Arena: Pabellón Príncipe Felipe; Zaragoza, Spain
- Dates: April 1990

Final positions
- Champions: (Socialist Federal Republic of Yugoslavia) Jugoplastika (2nd title)
- Runners-up: (Spain) FC Barcelona Banca Catalana
- Third place: (France) Limoges CSP
- Fourth place: (Greece) Aris

Awards and statistics
- MVP: (Socialist Federal Republic of Yugoslavia) Toni Kukoč

The 1990 FIBA European Champions Cup Final Four was the 1989–90 season's FIBA European Champions Cup Final Four tournament, organized by FIBA Europe.

Jugoplastika won its second title in a row, after defeating FC Barcelona Banca Catalana in the final game.

== Bracket ==
Semi-finals
(Socialist Federal Republic of Yugoslavia) Jugoplastika | 101
(France) Limoges CSP | 83
(Spain) FCB Banca Catalana | 104
(Greece) Aris | 83

Final
(Socialist Federal Republic of Yugoslavia) Jugoplastika | 72
(Spain) FCB Banca Catalana | 67
Third place
(France) Limoges CSP | 103
(Greece) Aris | 91

== Semifinals ==
=== FC Barcelona – Aris ===
17 April 1990
18:30

Boxscore

| FC Barcelona Banca Catalana (Spain) | 104–83 | (Greece) Aris |
Scoring by half: 45–36, 59–47
| Pts: Epi 24 | | Pts: Galis 26 |

Pabellón Príncipe Felipe, Zaragoza
Attendance: 11,000
Referees: Mikhail Davidov (URS), Paolo Zanon (ITA)

=== Jugoplastika – Limoges CSP ===
17 April 1990
20:30

Boxscore

| Jugoplastika (Socialist Federal Republic of Yugoslavia) | 101–83 | (France) Limoges CSP |
Scoring by half: 51–44, 50–39
| Pts: Perasović 25 | | Pts: Ostrowski 21 |

Pabellón Príncipe Felipe, Zaragoza
Attendance: 11,000
Referees: Wieslaw Zych (POL), Carl Jungebrand (FIN)

== Third place game ==
19 April 1990
18:30

Boxscore

| Limoges CSP (France) | 103–91 | (Greece) Aris |
Scoring by half: 54–51, 49–40
| Pts: Brooks, Collins, Ostrowski 25 | | Pts: Galis 43 |

Pabellón Príncipe Felipe, Zaragoza
Attendance: 11,000
Referees: Mikahil Davidov (URS), Carl Jungebrand (FIN)

== Final ==
19 April 1990
20:30

Boxscore

| Jugoplastika (Socialist Federal Republic of Yugoslavia) | 72–67 | (Spain) FC Barcelona Banca Catalana |
Scoring by half: 40–36, 32–31
| Pts: Kukoč 20; Rebs: Kukoč, Savić 7 Asts: Ivanović, Perasović 3 | | Pts: Norris 18; Rebs: Norris 10; Asts: Jiménez 4 |

Pabellón Príncipe Felipe, Zaragoza
Attendance: 11,000
Referees: Wieslaw Zych (POL), Paolo Zanon (ITA)

| Jugoplastika | FC Barcelona Banca Catalana |

| Starters: | | | P | R | A |
|---|---|---|---|---|---|
| PG | 4 | (Socialist Federal Republic of Yugoslavia) Zoran Sretenović | 5 | 5 | 2 |
| SG | 12 | (Socialist Federal Republic of Yugoslavia) Duško Ivanović (C) | 12 | 3 | 3 |
| SF | 5 | (Socialist Federal Republic of Yugoslavia) Velimir Perasović | 12 | 0 | 3 |
| PF | 8 | (Socialist Federal Republic of Yugoslavia) Goran Sobin | 7 | 4 | 0 |
| C | 14 | (Socialist Federal Republic of Yugoslavia) Dino Rađja | 12 | 4 | 0 |
| Reserves: | | | P | R | A |
| PG | 6 | (Socialist Federal Republic of Yugoslavia) Luka Pavićević | 0 | 0 | 0 |
| SF | 7 | (Socialist Federal Republic of Yugoslavia) Toni Kukoč | 20 | 7 | 1 |
| PG | 10 | (Socialist Federal Republic of Yugoslavia) Petar Naumoski | DNP | | |
| C | 11 | (Socialist Federal Republic of Yugoslavia) Žan Tabak | 0 | 0 | 0 |
| C | 13 | (Socialist Federal Republic of Yugoslavia) Zoran Savić | 4 | 7 | 0 |
Head coach:
(Socialist Federal Republic of Yugoslavia) Božidar Maljković

1989–90 FIBA European Champions Cup
Champions

Jugoplastika
Second title

| Starters: | | | P | R | A |
|---|---|---|---|---|---|
| PG | 7 | (Spain) Nacho Solozábal (C) | 5 | 2 | 2 |
| SG | 15 | (Spain) Epi | 10 | 4 | 0 |
| PF | 4 | (Spain) Andrés Jiménez | 8 | 1 | 4 |
| C | 10 | (United States) David Wood | 12 | 4 | 0 |
| C | 14 | (United States) Audie Norris | 18 | 10 | 1 |
| Reserves: | | | P | R | A |
| PG | 5 | (Spain) Quim Costa | 3 | 3 | 3 |
| PF | 8 | (Spain) Claudi Martínez | DNP | | |
| C | 9 | (Spain) Arturo Llopis | DNP | | |
| PF | 12 | (Spain) Xavi Crespo | 5 | 1 | 0 |
| C | 13 | (Spain) Ferran Martínez | 6 | 6 | 1 |
Head coach:
(Spain) Aíto García Reneses

== Awards ==
=== FIBA European Champions Cup Final Four MVP ===
- (Socialist Federal Republic of Yugoslavia) Toni Kukoč ( (Socialist Federal Republic of Yugoslavia) Jugoplastika)

=== FIBA European Champions Cup Finals Top Scorer ===
- (Socialist Federal Republic of Yugoslavia) Toni Kukoč ( (Socialist Federal Republic of Yugoslavia) Jugoplastika)
