= Antonio Martín Espina =

Spanish basketball player

Antonio Martín
Personal information
- Born: June 18, 1966 (age 60) Madrid, Spain
- Listed height: 6 ft 11 in (2.11 m)
- Listed weight: 230 lb (104 kg)

Career information
- College: Pepperdine (1986–1987)
- NBA draft: 1988: undrafted
- Playing career: 1982–1995
- Position: Center

Career history
- 1982–1983: Estudiantes
- 1983–1986, 1987–1995: Real Madrid

Career highlights
- EuroLeague champion (1995); FIBA European Selection (1991); 3× FIBA Saporta Cup champion (1984, 1989, 1992); FIBA Korać Cup champion (1988); 5× Spanish League champion (1984–1986, 1993, 1994); 4× Spanish Cup winner (1985, 1986, 1989, 1993)
Medals
Representing Spain
Men's Basketball
EuroBasket
Bronze medal – third place	1991 Italy
FIBA Europe U16 Championship
Silver medal – second place	1983 West Germany

Antonio Martín Espina (born June 18, 1966) is a Spanish retired professional basketball player. At a height of 2.10 m (6 ft 10 in), and a weight of 104 kg (230 lbs.), he played at the center position. He is the current president of the Spanish ACB.

== College career ==
Martín played college basketball at Pepperdine University, with the Pepperdine Waves, during the 1986–87 season.

== Professional career ==
After playing with Estudiantes, in the 1982–83 season, Martín moved to Real Madrid. He played with Real Madrid, for twelve years, from 1983, until 1995. He was a member of the FIBA European Selection team, in 1991.

== National team career ==
Martín was a member of the senior Spain men's national team. With Spain, he won the bronze medal at the 1991 EuroBasket, where he was also voted to the EuroBasket All-Tournament Team.

== After retirement ==
In July 2018, Martín was named the President of the Spanish ACB.

== Personal life ==
His brother, Fernando Martín Espina, also played with Real Madrid.

== Awards and accomplishments ==
=== Clubs (Real Madrid) ===
- 5× Spanish League Champion: (1983–84, 1984–85, 1985–86, 1992–93, 1993–94)
- 4× Spanish Cup Winner (1984–85, 1985–86, 1988–89, 1992–93)
- 3× FIBA European Cup Winners' Cup (FIBA Saporta Cup) Champion: (1983–84, 1988–89, 1991–92)
- EuroLeague Champion: (1994–95)
- FIBA Korać Cup Champion: (1987–88)

=== Spanish senior national team ===
- EuroBasket 1991: Bronze

=== Individual ===
- FIBA European Selection: 1991
- EuroBasket All-Tournament Team: 1991
