= Juan Antonio San Epifanio =

Spanish basketball player

Epi
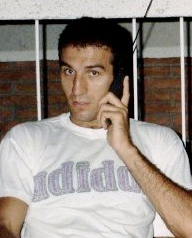
- Epi in 2007

Personal information
- Born: 12 June 1959 (age 67) Zaragoza, Aragón, Spain
- Listed height: 201 cm (6 ft 7 in)
- Listed weight: 91 kg (201 lb)

Career information
- Playing career: 1977–1995
- Position: Shooting guard / small forward
- Number: 15

Career history
- 1977–1995: FC Barcelona

Career highlights
- FIBA Club World Cup champion (1985); FIBA Club World Cup MVP (1987); Mister Europa (1984); 3× FIBA European Selection (1980, 1982, 1991); 2× FIBA Saporta Cup champion (1985, 1986); FIBA Saporta Cup Finals Top Scorer (1981); FIBA Korać Cup champion (1987); 101 Greats of European Basketball (2018); 7× Spanish League champion (1981, 1983 LEB, 1987–1990, 1995); 10× Spanish Cup winner (1978–1983, 1987, 1988, 1991, 1994); 3× Spanish Cup Finals Top Scorer (1981, 1983, 1984); FIBA's 50 Greatest Players (1991); 50 Greatest EuroLeague Contributors (2008); No. 15 retired by FC Barcelona; ISF World Schools' Championship champion (1977)
- FIBA Hall of Fame
Medals
Men's basketball
Representing Spain
Summer Olympic Games
Silver medal – second place	1984 Los Angeles
FIBA EuroBasket
Silver medal – second place	1983 France
Bronze medal – third place	1991 Rome
European U-18 Championship
Bronze medal – third place	1976 Spain	Under–18
Bronze medal – third place	1978 Italy	Under-18

Juan Antonio San Epifanio Ruiz (born 12 June 1959), most commonly known as "Epi", is a Spanish retired professional basketball player. He spent all of his club career playing with FC Barcelona. He was named the Mister Europa European Player of the Year in 1984, by the Italian basketball magazine Superbasket, and the Best European Player of the 1980s decade, by the French sports newspaper L'Équipe. He was named one of FIBA's 50 Greatest Players in 1991.

At the Opening Ceremony of the 1992 Barcelona Summer Olympic Games, he was honoured with being the last athlete to carry the Olympic torch, before handing it to the archer, Antonio Rebollo, who lit the fire in the cauldron, with an arrow. He was named one of the 50 Greatest EuroLeague Contributors in 2008. He became a FIBA Hall of Fame player in 2016. He is considered to be one of the greatest swingmen to have ever played in Europe.

== Early life and career ==
San Epifanio, known by almost everyone as simply, "Epi", grew up in Zaragoza, and began to play the sport of basketball in his native city. In 1973, Epi made his club debut with CN Helios, in the Spanish third division. However, his local club eventually rejected him. In 1974, FC Barcelona signed his older brother, Herminio, to a contract. Herminio then insisted that Epi would also join him at the club, and so the two moved to Barcelona. FC Barcelona's senior men's team head coach, Ranko Žeravica, gave Epi the opportunity to play with the club's youth teams.

== Professional career ==
=== FC Barcelona ===
In 1977, Epi joined the senior men's team of FC Barcelona. He quickly became the team's lead player. He would eventually go on to lead FC Barcelona to break the long-lived dominance of Real Madrid in Spain. During his career with the club, his teammates included Nacho Solozábal, Chicho Sibilio, Audie Norris, Juan de la Cruz, Andrés Jiménez, and other well-known players.

In a total of eighteen seasons with FC Barcelona (1977–78 to 1994–95), he won the top-level Spanish League title seven times, as he won the LEB Primera División (1981, 1983), and the Liga ACB (1987, 1988, 1989, 1990, and 1995). He also won the Spanish King's Cup ten times (1978, 1979, 1980, 1981, 1982, 1983, 1987, 1988, 1991, and 1994), the FIBA Saporta Cup twice (1985 and 1986), the FIBA Korać Cup once (1987), and the FIBA Club World Cup once (1985). Although he reached the FIBA European Champions Cup (EuroLeague) Finals 3 times (1984, 1990, 1991), he never lifted the most important trophy in European-wide club basketball.

He was named the MVP of the FIBA Club World Cup's 1987 edition. His 54 points scored in a game against Joventut Badalona, in 1984, counts among his most memorable performances. It is the second best single-game scoring total ever in the history of the top-tier level Spanish league (since 1957), and the highest ever single-game scoring mark in the history of the Spanish Liga ACB (since 1983).

== National team career ==
In 1979, Epi made his first appearance with the senior Spanish national team. With Spain's senior national team, he appeared in a total of 239 games, over a 15-year long period (1979–1994). He is in second place all-time in senior national team appearances for Spain (behind J. C. Navarro). He was also the first Spanish national team player that took part in four Summer Olympic Games, from the (1980 Moscow Summer Olympics, to the 1992 Barcelona Summer Olympics).

He was a silver Olympic medalist at the 1984 Los Angeles Summer Olympics, and a silver medalist at the EuroBasket 1983. He also won a bronze medal at the EuroBasket 1991.

== Post-playing career ==
San Epifanio concluded his professional basketball playing career on 25 May 1995, as F.C. Barcelona won another Spanish League title. Since 2007, he has been a basketball color commentator with Canal+ Spain.
