= Stéphane Ostrowski =

French basketball player

Personal information
- Born: March 17, 1962 (age 64) Bron, France
- Listed height: 6 ft 8.75 in (2.05 m)
- Listed weight: 230 lb (104 kg)

Career information
- Playing career: 1982–2005
- Position: Power forward
- Coaching career: 2005–2006

Career history

Playing
- 1982–1985: Le Mans
- 1985–1992: CSP Limoges
- 1992–1995: Olympique Antibes
- 1995–1998: Cholet Basket
- 1998–1999: Olympique Antibes
- 1999–2001: Élan Chalon
- 2001–2005: Olympique Antibes

Coaching
- 2005–2006: Olympique Antibes

Career highlights
- As a player: 6× FIBA European Selection Team (1990, 1991 2×, 1995 2×, 1996); FIBA Saporta Cup champion (1988); 4× French League champion (1988, 1989, 1990, 1995); 2× French League Cup winner (1988, 1990); French Federation Cup winner (1998); 4× French League French Player's MVP (1986, 1988–1990); French League Best Young Player (1984); 13× French League All-Star (1987–1998, 2000); French Basketball Hall of Fame (2013)
Medals
Men's Basketball
Representing France
Mediterranean Games
Bronze medal – third place	1993 France

Stéphane Ostrowski (born 17 March 1962) is a retired French professional basketball player. At a height of 6 ft 8 3/4 in (2.05 m) tall, he played at the power forward position. He is widely considered to be one of the major figures of French basketball history, and he was among the 105 player nominees for the 50 Greatest EuroLeague Contributors list.

== Professional career ==
Ostrowski led CSP Limoges to the FIBA Saporta Cup title in 1988, and to the FIBA Korać Cup final in 1987. He also played at the 1990 EuroLeague Final Four. He reached another European Cup final in 2001, when he contributed to Élan Sportif Chalonnais' great run in the Saporta Cup.

== National team career ==
Ostrowski was a regular member of the senior French national team. He reached the EuroBasket semifinals in 1991, finishing the tournament in fourth place.
