= EuroBasket 1991 =

International basketball event

Campionato europeo maschile di pallacanestro 1991

Tournament details
- Host country: Italy
- City: Rome
- Dates: 24–29 June
- Teams: 8
- Venue: 1 (in 1 host city)

Final positions
- Champions: Yugoslavia (5th title)
- Runners-up: Italy
- Third place: Spain
- Fourth place: France

Tournament statistics
- MVP: (Socialist Federal Republic of Yugoslavia) Toni Kukoč
- Top scorer: (Greece) Nikos Galis (32.6 points per game)

The 1991 FIBA European Championship, commonly called FIBA EuroBasket 1991, was the 27th FIBA EuroBasket regional basketball championship, held by FIBA Europe. It was held in Italy between 24 and 29 June 1991. Eight national teams entered the event under the auspices of FIBA Europe, the sport's regional governing body. The Palazzo dello Sport in Rome was the hosting venue of the tournament. Yugoslavia won its fifth FIBA European title by defeating hosts Italy with an 88–73 score in the final. Yugoslavia's Toni Kukoč was voted the tournament's MVP.

This was the first EuroBasket tournament in which currently active NBA players, that had also already played in an official NBA regular season game were allowed to participate, with Vlade Divac being the only NBA player in the tournament.

== Venues ==
All games were played at the Palazzo dello Sport in Rome.

| EuroBasket 1991 is located in Italy | Palazzo dello Sport; Capacity: 12,000; Opened in 1960 |

== Qualification ==
| Competition | Date | Vacancies | Qualified |
|---|---|---|---|
| Qualified through Qualifying Round | 9 May 1989 – 5 December 1990 | 8 | Bulgaria; Czechoslovakia; France; Greece; Italy; Poland; Spain; Yugoslavia |

== Format ==
- The teams were split in two groups of four teams each. The top two teams from each group advance to the semifinals. The winners in the knockout semifinals advance to the Final, and the losers figure in a third-place playoff.
- The third and fourth teams from each group competed in another bracket to define 5th through 8th place in the final standings.

== Preliminary round ==
| Qualified for the semifinals |

=== Group A ===
Times given below are in Central European Summer Time (UTC+2).

| Team | Pld | W | L | PF | PA | PD | Pts |
|---|---|---|---|---|---|---|---|
| Yugoslavia | 3 | 3 | 0 | 268 | 196 | +72 | 6 |
| Spain | 3 | 2 | 1 | 234 | 236 | −2 | 5 |
| Poland | 3 | 1 | 2 | 211 | 251 | −40 | 4 |
| Bulgaria | 3 | 0 | 3 | 236 | 266 | −30 | 3 |

24 June
14:30

Boxscore

| Bulgaria | 75–83 | Poland |
Scoring by half: 43–46, 32–37
| Pts: Mladenov 18 | | Pts: Zelig 24 |

Palazzo dello Sport, Rome
Referees: Richard Steeves (CAN), Vittorio Fiorito (ITA)

24 June
18:30

Boxscore

| Yugoslavia | 76–67 | Spain |
Scoring by half: 37–22, 39–45
| Pts: Rađa 17 | | Pts: Martín Espina 18 |

Palazzo dello Sport, Rome
Referees: Costas Rigas (GRE), Viliam Koller (TCH)

25 June
14:30

Boxscore

| Spain | 94–93 | Bulgaria |
Scoring by half: 43–51, 51–42
| Pts: Villacampa 32 | | Pts: Mladenov 26 |

Palazzo dello Sport, Rome
Referees: Vittorio Fiorito (ITA), Philippe Mailhabiau (FRA)

25 June
16:30

Boxscore

| Yugoslavia | 103–61 | Poland |
Scoring by half: 49–29, 54–32
| Pts: Paspalj 21 | | Pts: Zelig 12 |

Palazzo dello Sport, Rome
Referees: Viliam Koller (TCH), Colin Gerrard (ENG)

26 June
14:30

Boxscore

| Poland | 67–73 | Spain |
Scoring by half: 40–36, 27–37
| Pts: Zelig 19 | | Pts: Martín Espina 23 |

Palazzo dello Sport, Rome
Referees: Colin Gerrard (ENG), James Burr (USA)

26 June
18:30

Boxscore

| Bulgaria | 68–89 | Yugoslavia |
Scoring by half: 37–50, 31–39
| Pts: Mladenov 15 | | Pts: Divac 20 |

Palazzo dello Sport, Rome
Referees: Costas Rigas (GRE), Philippe Mailhabiau (FRA)

=== Group B ===
| Team | Pld | W | L | PF | PA | PD | Pts |
|---|---|---|---|---|---|---|---|
| Italy | 3 | 3 | 0 | 259 | 224 | +35 | 6 |
| France | 3 | 1 | 2 | 257 | 248 | +9 | 4 |
| Greece | 3 | 1 | 2 | 278 | 286 | −8 | 4 |
| Czechoslovakia | 3 | 1 | 2 | 283 | 319 | −36 | 4 |

24 June
16:30

Boxscore

| France | 104–80 | Czechoslovakia |
Scoring by half: 56–45, 48–35
| Pts: Dacoury 25 | | Pts: Petruška 14 |

Palazzo dello Sport, Rome
Referees: Colin Gerrard (ENG), Kamen Toshev (BUL)

24 June
20:45

Boxscore

| Greece | 72–82 | Italy |
Scoring by half: 45–31, 27–51
| Pts: Galis 19 | | Pts: Pittis 16 |

Palazzo dello Sport, Rome
Referees: Mikhail Davydov (URS), Vicente Sanchís (ESP)

25 June
18:30

Boxscore

| Greece | 113–123 (OT) | Czechoslovakia |
Scoring by half: 57–48, 48–57 Overtime: 8–18
| Pts: Galis 32 | | Pts: Svoboda 30 |

Palazzo dello Sport, Rome
Referees: Richard Steeves (CAN), Danko Radić (YUG)

25 June
20:45

Boxscore

| Italy | 75–72 | France |
Scoring by half: 34–39, 41–33
| Pts: Riva 18 | | Pts: Ostrowski 15 |

Palazzo dello Sport, Rome
Referees: James Burr (USA), Wieslaw Zych (POL)

26 June
16:30

Boxscore

| Greece | 93–81 | France |
Scoring by half: 42–32, 51–49
| Pts: Galis 39 | | Pts: Ostrowski 22 |

Palazzo dello Sport, Rome
Referees: Wieslaw Zych (POL), Richard Steeves (CAN)

25 June
20:30

Boxscore

| Italy | 102–80 | Czechoslovakia |
Scoring by half: 59–40, 43–40
| Pts: Riva 21 | | Pts: Ježdík, Michalík 16 |

Palazzo dello Sport, Rome
Referees: Danko Radić (YUG), Kamen Toshev (BUL)

== Knockout stage ==
=== Championship bracket ===
Semifinals
28 June – 18:30
France | 76
Yugoslavia | 97
28 June – 20:45
Italy | 93
Spain | 90

Final
29 June – 20:45
Yugoslavia | 88
Italy | 73
Third place
29 June – 18:30
France | 83
Spain | 101

==== Semifinals ====
28 June
18:30

Boxscore

| France | 76–97 | Yugoslavia |
Scoring by half: 44–50, 32–47
| Pts: Dacoury 17 | | Pts: Kukoč 24 |

Palazzo dello Sport, Rome
Referees: Colin Gerrard (ENG), Viliam Koller (TCH)

28 June
20:45

Boxscore

| Italy | 93–90 | Spain |
Scoring by half: 50–51, 43–39
| Pts: Gentile 23 | | Pts: San Epifanio 25 |

Palazzo dello Sport, Rome
Attendance: 12,000
Referees: James Burr (USA), Wieslaw Zych (POL)

==== Third place ====
29 June
19:00

Boxscore

| Spain | 101–83 | France |
Scoring by half: 51–38, 50–45
| Pts: Martín Espina 26 | | Pts: Ostrowski 19 |

Palazzo dello Sport, Rome
Referees: Vittorio Fiorito (ITA), Danko Radić (YUG)

==== Final ====
29 June
20:45

Boxscore

| Italy | 73–88 | Yugoslavia |
Scoring by half: 41–48, 32–40
| Pts: Pessina 14 | | Pts: Rađa 23 |

Palazzo dello Sport, Rome
Attendance: 12,000
Referees: udc: Taroni, Santambrogio, Calli; Arbitri: Costas Rigas (GRE), Richard Steeves (CAN)

=== 5th to 8th place ===
Classification round
28 June – 14:30
Greece | 110
Bulgaria | 83
28 June – 16:30
Czechoslovakia | 85
Poland | 72

Fifth place
29 June – 16:30
Greece | 95
Czechoslovakia | 79
Seventh place
29 June – 14:30
Bulgaria | 86
Poland | 90

28 June
14:30

Boxscore

| Greece | 110–83 | Bulgaria |
Scoring by half: 52–41, 58–42
| Pts: Galis 35 | | Pts: Mladenov 20 |

Palazzo dello Sport, Rome
Referees: Danko Radić (YUG), Richard Steeves (CAN)

28 June
16:30

Boxscore

| Czechoslovakia | 85–72 | Poland |
Scoring by half: 29–39, 56–33
| Pts: Hrubý 24 | | Pts: Duda 21 |

Palazzo dello Sport, Rome
Referees: Philippe Mailhabiau (FRA), Vittorio Fiorito (ITA)

29 June
14:30

Boxscore

| Bulgaria | 86–90 | Poland |
Scoring by half: 42–42, 44–48
| Pts: Amiorkov 25 | | Pts: Zieliński 25 |

Palazzo dello Sport, Rome
Referees: Vicente Sanchís (ESP), Mikhail Davydov (URS)

29 June
16:30

Boxscore

| Greece | 95–79 | Czechoslovakia |
Scoring by half: 53–39, 42–40
| Pts: Galis 37 | | Pts: Okáč 15 |

Palazzo dello Sport, Rome
Referees: James Burr (USA), Kamen Toshev (BUL)

== Awards ==
1991 FIBA EuroBasket champions

Yugoslavia
5th title

1991 FIBA EuroBasket MVP: Toni Kukoč ( (Socialist Federal Republic of Yugoslavia) Yugoslavia)

All-Tournament Team
(Italy) Nando Gentile
(Greece) Nikos Galis
(Socialist Federal Republic of Yugoslavia) Toni Kukoč (MVP)
(Spain) Antonio Martín Espina
(Socialist Federal Republic of Yugoslavia) Vlade Divac

== Final standings ==
| Rank | Team | Record |
|---|---|---|
| 1st place, gold medalist(s) | Yugoslavia | 5–0 |
| 2nd place, silver medalist(s) | Italy | 4–1 |
| 3rd place, bronze medalist(s) | Spain | 3–2 |
| 4 | France | 1–4 |
| 5 | Greece | 3–2 |
| 6 | Czechoslovakia | 2–3 |
| 7 | Poland | 2–3 |
| 8 | Bulgaria | 0–5 |

| 1st | 2nd | 3rd | 4th |
| Yugoslavia Zoran Sretenović; Velimir Perasović; Aleksandar Đorđević; Toni Kukoč; Žarko Paspalj; Jure Zdovc; Predrag Danilović; Zoran Jovanović; Vlade Divac; Arijan Komazec; Dino Rađa; Zoran Savić | Italy Alessandro Fantozzi; Ferdinando Gentile; Walter Magnifico; Sandro Dell'Agnello; Andrea Gracis; Roberto Brunamonti; Roberto Premier; Riccardo Pittis; Antonello Riva; Davide Pessina; Ario Costa; Stefano Rusconi | Spain Jordi Villacampa; Mike Hansen; José Miguel Antúnez; Rafael Jofresa; Quique Andreu; Manel Bosch; Pep Cargol; Fernando Arcega; Juan Antonio Orenga; Silvano Bustos; Antonio Martín Espina; Juan Antonio San Epifanio | France Frédéric Forte; Valéry Demory; Antoine Rigaudeau; Richard Dacoury; Philip Szanyiel; Stéphane Ostrowski; Hugues Occansey; Didier Gadou; Félix Courtinard; Georges Adams; Jim Deines; Jim Bilba |
