= Croatia at the 2001 Mediterranean Games =

- IOC code: CRO

in Tunis
- Medals Ranked 9th: Gold 6 Silver 6 Bronze 6 Total 18

Mediterranean Games appearances (overview)
- 1993; 1997; 2001; 2005; 2009; 2013; 2018; 2022

Other related appearances
- Yugoslavia (1951–1991)

Croatia competed at the 2001 Mediterranean Games in Tunis, Tunisia from 2 to 15 September 2001.

== Medals by sport ==
Sport	Gold	Silver	Bronze	Total
Swimming	2	2	2	6
Athletics	1	2	1	4
Table tennis	1	0	1	2
Basketball	1	0	0	1
Handball	1	0	0	1
Bowls	0	1	0	1
Sailing	0	1	0	1
Boxing	0	0	1	1
Karate	0	0	1	1
Totals (9 entries)	6	6	6	18

== Medalists ==
Medal	Name	Sport	Event	Date
~~Gold~~	~~Yoto Yotov~~	Weightlifting	Men's 77 kg snatch	5 September
~~Gold~~	~~Yoto Yotov~~	Weightlifting	Men's 77 kg clean & jerk	5 September
~~Gold~~	~~Siniša Ergotić~~	Athletics	Men's long jump	12 September
Gold	Blanka Vlašić	Athletics	Women's high jump	12 September
Gold	Marko Strahija	Swimming	Men's 200m backstroke	
Gold	Vanja Rogulj	Swimming	Men's 100m breaststroke	
Gold	Tamara Boroš	Table tennis	Women's singles	
Gold	Men's handball team: Ivano Balić Tihomir Baltić Zvonimir Bilić Davor Dominiković Mirza Džomba Slavko Goluža Božidar Jović Mario Kelentrić Igor Kos Blaženko Lacković Valter Matošević Diego Modrušan Renato Sulić Goran Šprem Vedran Zrnić	Handball	Men's tournament	
Gold	Women's basketball team: Vanda Baranović Amra Đapo Božena Erceg Koraljka Hlede Ana Lelas Katarina Maloča Jasenka Marohnić Marina Mazić Emilija Podrug Sandra Popović Slavica Pretreger Jelena Zrnić	Basketball	Women's tournament	
Silver	Darko Juričić	Athletics	Men's 400 meters hurdles	11 September
Silver	Nevena Lenđel	Athletics	Women's high jump	12 September
Silver	Sanja Jovanović	Swimming	Women's 100m backstroke	
Silver	Mate Arapov	Sailing	Men's laser	
Silver	Sandro Gulja	Bowls	Men's precision throw	
Silver	Miloš Milošević, Ivan Mladina, Vanja Rogulj and Marko Strahija	Swimming	Men's 4×100m medley relay	
Bronze	Sanja Jovanović	Swimming	Women's 100m freestyle	
Bronze	Edi Ponoš	Athletics	Men's javelin throw	14 September
Bronze	Jetiš Bajrami	Boxing	Men's featherweight	
Bronze	Lana Susović	Karate	Women's 55 kg	
Bronze	Sandra Paović and Kornelija Vajda	Table tennis	Women's team	
Bronze	Igor Čerenšek, Lovrenco Franičević, Marijan Kanjer and Ivan Mladina	Swimming	Men's 4×100m freestyle relay	
