= Basketball at the 1997 Mediterranean Games =

The basketball tournament at the 1997 Mediterranean Games was held in Bari, Italy.

== Medalists ==
Event	Gold	Silver	Bronze
Men	Spain	Italy	(Federal Republic of Yugoslavia) FR Yugoslavia
Women	Croatia	Turkey	France

== Men's Competition ==
=== Standings ===
Rank	Team
1st place, gold medalist(s)	Spain Pere Capdevila, Rodrigo de la Fuente, Iñaki de Miguel, Martín Ferrer, Iker Iturbe, Jordi Millera, Quique Moraga, Nacho Rodilla, Nacho Romero, Francesc Solana, Paco Vázquez, Óscar Yebra. Coach: Paco García
2nd place, silver medalist(s)	Italy Marcelo Damião, Michele Mian, Flavio Portaluppi, Gianluca Basile, Massimo Ruggeri, Pier Filippo Rossi, Germán Scarone, Paolo Alberti, Alessandro Tonolli, Marco Sambugaro, Samuele Podestà, Massimiliano Monti. Coach: Attilio Caja
3rd place, bronze medalist(s)	(Federal Republic of Yugoslavia) FR Yugoslavia Vlado Šćepanović, Veselin Petrović, Igor Rakočević, Aleksandar Glintić, Aleksandar Nađfeji, Jovo Stanojević, Aleksandar Lazić, Goran Nikolić, Đuro Ostojić, Nenad Čanak, Dragan Basarić, Dragan Lukovski.
4	Greece Vasilis Kikilias, Giannis Sioutis, Giorgos Giannouzakos, Giorgos Limniatis, Ilias Tsopis, Giorgos Paulidis, Giorgos Chrysanthopoulos, Kostas Nikakis, Nikos Vetoulas, Michalis Yfantis, Vasilis Soulis, Apostolos Dakos. Coach: Giorgos Tsitskaris
5	Croatia Zoran Antić, Mladen Erjavec, Ante Grgurević, Hrvoje Henjak, Petar Maleš, Damir Milačić, Igor Miličić, Mate Miliša, Davor Pejčinović, Joško Poljak, Jurica Ružić, Dubravko Zemljić.
6	Turkey Erdal Bibo, Hidayet Türkoğlu, Alpay Öztaş, Mustafa Abi, Zaza Enden, Onur Aydın, Kerem Tunçeri, Serkan Erdoğan, Arda Vekiloğlu, Mehmet Kahyaoğlu, Kaya Peker, Ömer Onan. Coach: Nihad Izić
7	Slovenia Andrej Božič, Primož Brezec, Miha Čmer, Dragiša Drobnjak, Gregor Hafnar, Goran Jurak, Marko Maravič, Boštjan Nachbar, Ernest Novak, Matjaž Smodiš, Miloš Šporar, Marko Verginella.
8	Bosnia and Herzegovina Goran Terzić, Elvir Ovčina, Azur Sakić, Jasmin Hukić, Selim Mulić, Elmedin Konaković, Armin Isaković, Selmir Husanović, Abdurahman Kahrimanović, Muamer Karanović, Damir Pindžo, Admir Bukva.
9	Albania Pandush Palko, Dritan Mema, Adrian Semani, Bledar Gjeçaj, Artomen Çaçaliku, Artan Kuqo, Dritan Meli, Gentri Mançe, Sokol Jahollari, Edmond Përmeti, Beniamin Idrizi.

== Women's Competition ==
=== Standings ===
Rank	Team
1st place, gold medalist(s)	Croatia Lidija Abrlić, Tihana Abrlić, Vanda Baranović, Amra Đapo, Vedrana Grgin, Sonja Kireta, Monika Kovač, Korana Longin, Katarina Maloča, Emilija Podrug, Slavica Pretreger, Mirjana Tabak.
2nd place, silver medalist(s)	Turkey Didem Akın, Dilek Buyuran, Sariye Gökçe, Çelen Kılınç, Serap Köz, Handan Özbek, Nalan Özel, Derya Taşçı Özyer, Arzu Özyiğit, Asuman Tan, Nevriye Yılmaz, Filiz Yükrük. Coach: Erdinç Talu
3rd place, bronze medalist(s)	France Nicole Antibe, Johanna Boutet, Laure Francillette, Séverine Gisselbrecht, Christelle Jouandon, Magalie Lacroix, Nathalie Lesdema, Sandra Le Dréan, Lætitia Maignaut, Cathy Melain, Lætitia Moussard, Yannick Souvré.
4	Greece
5	Spain
6	Italy Chiara Strazzabosco, Francesca Zara, Angela Arcangeli, Angela Adamoli, Marta Cattani, Nicoletta Caselin, Viviana Ballabio, Elena Paparazzo, Marta Rezoagli, Pina Tufano, Lorenza Arnetoli, Novella Schiesaro. Coach: Riccardo Sales
7	Bosnia and Herzegovina Melisa Hadžimustafić, Nura Imamović, Aiša Suljanović, Lejla Durmić, Amra Alagić, Dragana Zorić, Dženana Neimarlija, Nidžara Tabaković, Alisa Tunja.
8	Slovenia Mojca Besednjak, Mojca Deu, Mojca Erman, Mateja Glavnik, Tanja Gričar, Tanja Grom, Sabina Komac, Andreja Križnik, Maja Mikelj, Marija Milenkovič, Barbara Pungeršek, Petra Smrekar.
