= Basketball at the 2001 Mediterranean Games =

Basketball at the Mediterranean 2001 Games was a tournament of eight men's and women's international basketball teams taking part in the 2001 edition of the Mediterranean Games. Men's tournament was held in Nabeul while Women's tournament was held in Radès.

== Medalists ==
Event	Gold	Silver	Bronze
Men's Competition	Spain	Greece	Italy
Women's Competition	Croatia	Italy	Spain

== Men's Competition ==
=== Group A ===
	Team	Points	G	W	D	L	GF	GA	Diff
1.	Greece	8	4	4	0	0	317	266	+51
2.	(Federal Republic of Yugoslavia) FR Yugoslavia	7	4	3	0	1	348	278	+70
3.	Tunisia	6	4	2	0	2	284	261	+23
4.	Lebanon	5	4	1	0	3	277	347	−70
5.	Bosnia and Herzegovina	4	4	0	0	4	272	346	−74

- September 3, 2001 (1st day)

Greece	67 – 79	(Federal Republic of Yugoslavia) FR Yugoslavia
Lebanon	62 – 69	Tunisia

- September 4, 2001 (2nd day)

Lebanon	87 – 75	Bosnia and Herzegovina
Tunisia	66 – 77	(Federal Republic of Yugoslavia) FR Yugoslavia

- September 5, 2001 (3rd day)

Lebanon	56 – 101	Greece
Tunisia	88 – 54	Bosnia and Herzegovina

- September 6, 2001 (4th day)

Greece	81 – 70	Bosnia and Herzegovina
Lebanon	72 – 102	(Federal Republic of Yugoslavia) FR Yugoslavia

- September 7, 2001 (5th day)

Bosnia and Herzegovina	73 – 90	(Federal Republic of Yugoslavia) FR Yugoslavia
Greece	68 – 61	Tunisia

=== Group B ===
	Team	Points	G	W	D	L	GF	GA	Diff
1.	Spain	8	4	4	0	0	331	216	+115
2.	Italy	7	4	3	0	1	273	236	+37
3.	Turkey	6	4	2	0	2	274	253	+21
4.	Algeria	5	4	1	0	3	233	268	−35
5.	Syria	4	4	0	0	4	241	379	−138
6.	Cyprus	-	-	-	-	-	-	-	−

Cyprus withdrew from the competition.

- September 3, 2001 (1st day)

Italy	66 – 56	Turkey
Syria	54 – 74	Algeria

- September 4, 2001 (2nd day)

Turkey	92 – 65	Syria
Spain	69 – 43	Italy

- September 5, 2001 (3rd day)

Syria	63 – 95	Italy
Spain	81 – 52	Algeria

- September 6, 2001 (4th day)

Syria	59 – 118	Spain
Turkey	64 – 59	Algeria

- September 7, 2001 (5th day)

Italy	69 – 48	Algeria
Spain	63 – 62	Turkey

=== Final round ===
Semi-finals
Greece	80
Italy	78
Spain	84
(Federal Republic of Yugoslavia) FR Yugoslavia	73

Final
Greece	31
Spain	72
Third place
Italy	84
(Federal Republic of Yugoslavia) FR Yugoslavia	70

=== Semi finals ===
- September 8, 2001

Greece	80 – 78	Italy
Spain	73 – 84	(Federal Republic of Yugoslavia) FR Yugoslavia

=== Finals ===
- September 8, 2001 — 9th/10th place

Bosnia and Herzegovina	83 – 75	Syria

- September 8, 2001 — 7th/8th place

Algeria	88 – 72	Lebanon

- September 8, 2001 — 5th/6th place

Tunisia	66 – 63	Turkey

- September 9, 2001 — Bronze Medal Match

Italy	102 – 85	(Federal Republic of Yugoslavia) FR Yugoslavia

- September 9, 2001 — Gold Medal Match

Greece	61 – 72	Spain

=== Standings ===
Rank	Team
1st place, gold medalist(s)	Spain Roger Grimau, Nacho Yáñez, Carlos Cazorla, Carles Marco, Román Montañez, Alex Mumbrú, Ricardo Gonzalez, Javier Rodriguez, Jesús Fernandez, Salva Guardia, Alfons Alzamora, Ismael Torres
2nd place, silver medalist(s)	Greece Alexis Falekas, Nikos Zisis, Dimitris Diamantidis, Christos Tapoutos, Dimitrios Misiakos, Antonios Asimakopoulos, Vassilis Spanoulis, Periklis Dorkofikis, Georgios Pavlidis, Artemios Kouvaris, Dimitrios Marmarinos, Pantelis Papaioakeim
3rd place, bronze medalist(s)	Italy Tomas Ress, Massimo Bulleri, Andrea Michelori, Fabio Zanelli, Manuel Vanuzzo, Stefano Mancinelli, Mario Gigena, Alessandro Cittadini, Marco Mordente, Walter Santarossa, Samuele Podestà, Massimiliano Monti
4	(Federal Republic of Yugoslavia) FR Yugoslavia
5	Tunisia
6	Turkey Umut Tınay, İnanç Koç, İsmail Çevik, Umut Görür, Volkan Çetintahra, Ender Arslan, Erdal Bibo, Erkan Veyseloğlu, Cüneyt Erden, Hüseyin Demiral, Nedim Dal, Muratcan Güler, Ömer Ünver, Emre Ekim, Fatih Solak. Coach: Alaattin Yakan.
7	Algeria
8	Lebanon
9	Bosnia and Herzegovina Esmir Rizvić, Narcis Begovac, Mersad Terzić, Ermin Jazvin, Kenan Bajramović, Domagoj Pinjuh, Muris Andelija, Vladimir Koprivica, Haris Jahić, Damir Železnik, Jasenko Elezović, Goran Ikonić, Dalibor Stupar, Samir Bajrović.
10	Syria

== Women's Competition ==
=== Group A ===
	Team	Points	G	W	D	L	GF	GA	Diff
1.	Italy	8	4	4	0	0	287	209	+78
2.	Turkey	7	4	3	0	1	290	247	+43
3.	Slovenia	6	4	2	0	2	238	226	+12
4.	Tunisia	5	4	1	0	3	235	277	−42
5.	Morocco	4	4	0	0	4	205	296	−91

- September 3, 2001 (1st day)

Italy	69 – 68	Turkey
Morocco	54 – 63	Tunisia

- September 4, 2001 (2nd day)

Slovenia	61 – 54	Tunisia
Morocco	44 – 84	Italy

- September 5, 2001 (3rd day)

Turkey	76 – 53	Morocco
Italy	57 – 48	Slovenia

- September 6, 2001 (4th day)

Turkey	61 – 56	Slovenia
Tunisia	49 – 77	Italy

- September 7, 2001 (5th day)

Slovenia	73 – 54	Morocco
Turkey	85 – 69	Tunisia

=== Group B ===
	Team	Points	G	W	D	L	GF	GA	Diff
1.	Croatia	8	4	4	0	0	339	249	+90
2.	Spain	7	4	3	0	1	325	240	+85
3.	Greece	6	4	2	0	2	264	229	+35
4.	(Federal Republic of Yugoslavia) FR Yugoslavia	5	4	1	0	3	237	238	−1
5.	Lebanon	4	4	0	0	4	146	355	−209

- September 3, 2001 (1st day)

Croatia	97 – 49	Lebanon
Greece	58 – 77	Spain

- September 4, 2001 (2nd day)

Croatia	82 – 58	(Federal Republic of Yugoslavia) FR Yugoslavia
Lebanon	43 – 102	Spain

- September 5, 2001 (3rd day)

Lebanon	25 – 83	Greece
Spain	71 – 58	(Federal Republic of Yugoslavia) FR Yugoslavia

- September 6, 2001 (4th day)

Greece	56 – 48	(Federal Republic of Yugoslavia) FR Yugoslavia
Croatia	81 – 75	Spain

- September 7, 2001 (5th day)

Lebanon	29 – 73	(Federal Republic of Yugoslavia) FR Yugoslavia
Croatia	79 – 67	Greece

=== Final round ===
Semi-finals
Croatia	86
Turkey	72
Italy	72
Spain	66

Final
Italy	62
Croatia	71
Third place
Spain	72
Turkey	71

=== Semi finals ===
- September 8, 2001

Croatia	86 – 72	Turkey
Italy	72 – 66	Spain

=== Finals ===
- September 8, 2001 — 9th/10th place

Morocco	56 – 50	Lebanon

- September 8, 2001 — 7th/8th place

Tunisia	50 – 73	(Federal Republic of Yugoslavia) FR Yugoslavia

- September 9, 2001 — 5th/6th place

Slovenia	58 – 47	Greece

- September 9, 2001 — Bronze Medal Match

Spain	72 – 71	Turkey

- September 9, 2001 — Gold Medal Match

Italy	62 – 71	Croatia

=== Standings ===
Rank	Team
1st place, gold medalist(s)	Croatia Sandra Popović, Slavica Pretreger, Božena Erceg, Amra Dapo, Ana Lelas, Jasenka Marohnić, Katarina Maloča, Koraljka Hlede, Marina Mazić, Vanda Baranović-Urukalo, Jelena Zrnić, Emilija Podrug. Coach: Boris Jakimenko
2nd place, silver medalist(s)	Italy Marianna Balleggi, Simona Ballardini, Renata Zocco, Francesca Zara, Anna Zimmerle, Alice Pedrazzi, Valentina Gardellin, Elena Paparazzo, Raffaella Masciadri, Laura Macchi, Lorenza Arnetoli, Federica Ciampoli. Coach: Aldo Corno
3rd place, bronze medalist(s)	Spain Silvia Morales, María José Alonso, Paula Seguí, Laia Palau, Isabel Sanchez, Noemi Jordana, Maite Checa, Raquel Delgado, Marta Fernández, Lucila Pascua, Iria Villar, Nieves Llamas. Coach: Juan Corral
4	Turkey Aylin Yıldızoğlu, Şaziye İvegin Üner, Arzu Özyiğit, Sariye Kumral, Esmeral Tunçluer, Çelen Kılınç, Filiz Yükrük, Gülizar Sezer, Yasemin Horasan, Olga, Nevriye Yılmaz, Dilek Dedeoğlu. Coach: Cem Akdağ
5	Slovenia Alenka Potočnik, Metka Obrovnik, Simona Jurse, Katja Temnik, Spela Prevodnik, Tina Kvaternik, Polona Oberc, Mojca Markovič, Anja Vilfan, Barbara Gričar, Daliborka Jocic, Sandra Piršić. Coach: Dragomir Bukvić
6	Greece Eleni Papadimitriou, Stavroula Prassa, Olga Chatzinikolaou, Aikaterini Spatharou, Magdalini Karampatzaki, Styliani Kaltsidou, Margarita Malama, Kanella Bimpiri, Paschalina Giuleka, Afroditi Kosma, Eirini Gkizi, Malamatenia Karastamati. Coach: Dimitris Bakogeorgos
7	(Federal Republic of Yugoslavia) FR Yugoslavia Sanja Janković, Dara Kovačević, Suzana Milanović, Katarina Manić, Jelena Babić, Jelena Škerović, Milena Vuković, Bojana Vučinić, Iva Perovanović, Marijana Ivović, Stojanka Ostojić, Danica Vujović. Coach: Momir Milatović
8	Tunisia Mariem Zbidi, Oumaima Farah, Ines Hmida-Makni, Kaouther Achour, Souhir Raouani, Heather Mansour, Karima Oueslati, Henda Chebli, Faiza Soudani, Mouna Khriji, Salma Nafetni, Imen Ben Othmane. Coach: Jeff Dubreuil
9	Morocco Imane Chokairi, Asmaa Akaroi, Fatima Dahine, Abiba Makboul, Lamiae Laroussi, Najwa Jyar, Khaddija Ceouane, Zineb Zoukay, Amal Lahlali, Zineb Mounfalouti, Zineb Lahdiri. Coach: Estiban Patrique
10	Lebanon Emma Eskidjian, Nelly Nassar, Jean Dark El Bitar, Marina Haydar, Sossy Ingirkochian, Veronika Abou Jaoude, Natalia Hamze, Nissrine Dandan, Wadad Mogharbel, Christine Mouffarrege, Sarby Jokarian. Coach: Raphael Bernal
