= EuroBasket Women 1995 squads =

List of basketball teams

== Group A ==
=== FR Yugoslavia ===
Yugoslavia roster
Players
Coaches

Pos.	No.	Name	Age – Date of birth	Height	Club
	4	Gordana Bogojević	–
	5	Danijela Ilić	–
	6	Mirjana Sekulić	–
	7	Julkica Marković	–
	8	Jadranka Ćosić	–
	9	Daliborka Vilipić	–
	10	Mensura Hadžić	–
	11	Nina Bjedov	–
	12	Snežana Momirov	–
	13	Merlina Gostiljac	–
	14	Anđelija Arbutina	–
	15	Jelena Mirković	–

Head coach

- Dragomir Bukvić

Legend

- (C) Team captain
- nat field describes country
  of last club
  before the tournament
- Age field is age on June 8, 1995

== Group B ==
=== Ukraine ===
Ukraine roster
Players
Coaches
Guard Forward Guard

Pos.	No.	Name	Age – Date of birth	Height	Club
	4	Ruslana Kyrychenko	–
	5	Victoria Burenok	–
	6	Elena Marincikova	–
	7	Elena Oberemko	–
	8	Olena Vergun	–
	9	Maryna Tkachenko	–
	10	Victoriya Yefremenko	–
	11	Oksana Dovgalyuk	–
	12	Olena Vekhova	–
	13	Nataliya Silyanova	–
	14	Olha Shliakhova	–
	15	Lyudmyla Nazarenko	–

Head coach

- Isaac Maizlin

Legend

- (C) Team captain
- nat field describes country
  of last club
  before the tournament
- Age field is age on June 8, 1995

=== Croatia ===
Croatia roster
Players
Coaches

Pos.	No.	Name	Age – Date of birth	Height	Club
	4	Monika Kovač	–
	5	Slavica Pretreger	–
	6	Linda Antić	–
	7	Korie Hlede	–
	8	Vedrana Grgin-Fonseca	–
	9	Danira Bilić	–
	10	Nikolina Grabovac	–
	11	Žana Lelas	–
	12	Mirjana Tabak	–
	13	Vanda Baranović	–
	14	Korana Longin-Zanze	–
	15	Sonja Kireta	–

Head coach

Legend

- (C) Team captain
- nat field describes country
  of last club
  before the tournament
- Age field is age on June 8, 1995
