= Spanoudakis =

Spanoudakis (Greek: Σπανουδάκης) is a surname. Notable people with the surname include:

- Alekos Spanoudakis (1928–2019), Greek basketball player
- Ioannis Spanoudakis (1930–2010), Greek basketball player and coach
- Stamatis Spanoudakis (born 1948), Greek composer
