= Basketball in Greece =

- Country: Greece
- Governing body: Hellenic Basketball Federation; HEBA
- National team: Greece
- First played: 1910
- Clubs: 13(Men)

National competitions
- Greek Cup; Greek Women's Cup

Club competitions
- Greek Basket League; Greek Super Cup; Greek A2 Basket League; Greek B Basket League; Greek C Basket League; Greek Women's Basket League; Greek Women's A2 League

International competitions
- FIBA World Cup; Summer Olympic Games; EuroBasket; EuroLeague; EuroCup; FIBA Champions League; FIBA Women's World Cup; EuroBasket Women; EuroLeague Women; EuroCup Women

Basketball in Greece erupted with the win of the Greece men's national basketball team at the 1987 EuroBasket in Athens, which caused a general basketball craze in the country. Since then, the Greece men's national teams have achieved consistent international success, leading Greece to join Russia, Serbia, Croatia, Italy, Spain, France, and Lithuania in the circle of European basketball powers. In addition to the Greece national team's triumph in 1987, they won the gold medal at the 2005 EuroBasket, silver medals at the 1989 EuroBasket, and the 2006 FIBA World Cup, and the bronze medal at the 2009 EuroBasket.

At the professional club level, the Greece men's basketball clubs have, in European-wide Cup competitions, organized under both FIBA and EuroLeague Basketball, won 20 European championships, 11 of which have been won in the 1st-tier level EuroLeague competition, as well as three world club championships at the FIBA Club World Cup, bringing the total amount of international titles won by Greek men's clubs to 22. At the women's professional club level, Athinaikos won the title of the 2nd-tier EuroCup, in 2010.

== History ==
=== The early years of the sport in Greece ===
The sport of basketball has a long history in the country of Greece, having first come to the country in the year 1910. The first official championship of the Greek League, then called the Panhellenic Championship, was contested as regional champions playing against each other to decide a winner, starting with the 1927–28 season.

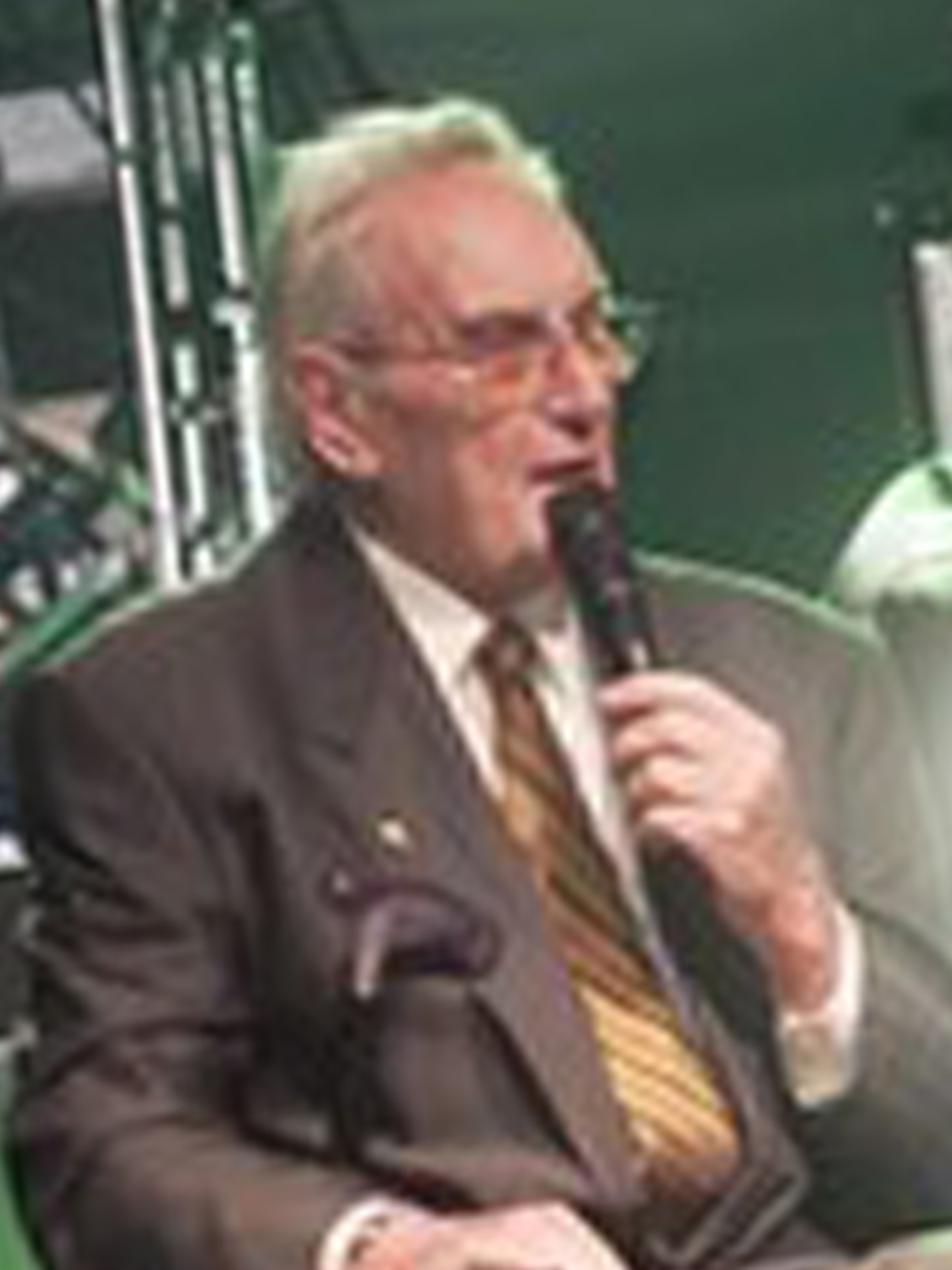
Faidon Matthaiou, considered to be the Patriarch of the basketball in Greece

The Greek athlete Faidon Matthaiou is considered to be the patriarch of the sport in the country. He was the country's first great player in the sport. He led Greece's senior national team to the bronze medal at the 1949 EuroBasket, in the first tournament it competed in, right after the national team had been formed. Matthaiou would go on to become one of the best players in Europe in the 1950s.

=== The 1950s ===
The first great club team in the history of Greek basketball was the Greek League club Panellinios. Panellinios featured 5 great players, known as the "Golden Five" ("Chrysi Pentada"), or "The Fabulous Five": Themis Cholevas (PG), Dinos Papadimas (SG), Mimis Stefanidis (SF), Panos Manias (PF), and Aristeidis Roubanis (C). The Golden Five, and its head coach, Nikos Nisiotis, was considered to be one of the best teams in Europe at the time in the 1950s, as it won the invitational European club tournament 2 out of 3 years, and made the final in the other year. The invitational European club tournament was the forerunner tournament of the EuroLeague.

During that era, Panellinios took part in the biggest international club tournaments in Europe, the predecessors of the EuroLeague that were then held instead of the EuroLeague tournament. The club advanced to the final of the 1954 San Remo Tournament, which they lost 81–74 to the Italian League club Borletti Milano. Panellinios then won the 1955 Brussels Tournament, by defeating the Yugoslav League club Crvena zvezda in the final, by a score of 91–67. Panellinios also won the 1956 San Remo Tournament, by defeating the Italian League club Minganti Bologna, by a score of 67–37.

Nisiotis is credited by most as being mainly responsible for the development of the sport in Greece in the 1930s and 1940s. Panellinios also featured the great scorer Antonis Christeas.

The Spanoudakis brothers, Ioannis and Alekos, who were players of Olympiacos, were among the first early important pioneers of the modern style sport in the country. Boston Celtics players Bob Cousy, and the Greek American player Lou Tsioropoulos, came to Greece in the 1950s, and gave teaching clinics on what the Celtics were doing, and how they were playing the game at the time. The Spanoudakis brothers learned directly from them, and were among the first players in Greece to incorporate much of the American style of basketball, and to begin playing a brand of basketball in Greece that incorporated many of the moves and plays that they had been shown by the Celtics players.

=== The 1960s ===
In the 1963–64 season, the top men's basketball Greek League formed into a national league system for the first time. Up until that point, the Greek men's national basketball championship had been contested by teams locally at the regional level, with the champions of each regional level then playing against each other. With the start of the 1963–64 season, a true nationwide league system, called the Alpha National Category, was formed for the first time

The next great club team in men's Greek basketball was AEK, which became the first Greek team to win a European trophy in any sport. AEK was led by great players such as: Georgios Amerikanos, Georgios Trontzos, who was the second 7 footer to play for Gonzaga University, Christos Zoupas, and Antonis Christeas, who had also been a part of the great Greek Panellinios teams of the 1950s.

AEK made it to the 1966 Final Four of the FIBA European Champions Cup of the 1965–66 season, which was the first time that the EuroLeague ever used a final four system, thus becoming the first Greek team to ever play in a final four in the EuroLeague. AEK also won the championship of the European-wide 2nd-tier level Cup Winners' Cup of the 1967–68 season, which was the first European trophy won by any Greek sports team. In the final game against Slavia VŠ Praha, which took place in Pangrati, Athens, at Panathenaic Stadium, the attendance was 80,000 people seated in the stadium, and 40,000 people standing, with an additional 3,000 police officers to keep order.

AEK won 5 Greek League championships in the decade of the 1960s, in a sequence of 4 in a row and 5 out of 6 (1963, 1964, 1965, 1966, 1968), surrounded by an earlier Greek League championship in 1958, and another later one in 1970. Making it a total of 7 Greek League championships won in 11 seasons for the club in that era.

The next great individual Greek player was Georgios Kolokithas, who was considered to be one of the greatest scorers in European basketball in his time in the 1960s. He was the Greek League Top Scorer 3 times, in the years 1964, 1966, and 1967. He was also the EuroBasket Top Scorer twice, in the years 1967 and 1969. He was named to the FIBA European Selection in 1970. After the great career that he had, Kolokithas was named one of FIBA's 50 Greatest Players in 1991.

The Greek Women's League began with the 1967–68 season.

=== The 1970s ===
The decade of the 1970s was dominated at the men's top club level by Panathinaikos, as they won the Greek Basket League championship in 1971, 1972, 1973, 1974, 1975, and 1977. In total, the club won 6 Greek League championships during the 1970s. During this era, the club featured famous Greek players such as: Georgios Kolokithas, Apostolos Kontos, Dimitris Kokolakis, Memos Ioannou, and Takis Koroneos.

Olympiacos also won 2 Greek League championships during the 1970s, winning the title in both 1976 and 1978. The club featured famous Greek players like Steve Giatzoglou and Georgios Kastrinakis, as well as players like Georgios Barlas, Paul Melini, and Pavlos Diakoulas. In 1976, the first official men's Greek Cup tournament was held. Olympiacos dominated the Greek Cup in its early years, as they won the first 3 editions of the tournament (1976, 1977, and 1978). Previously, two Attica State Cup tournaments had been held in the years 1967 and 1971, with AEK winning both of those tournaments.

Aris finished the decade by winning its first Greek League championship since 1930, in 1979. Aris was led by the great scorer of the time, Charis Papageorgiou. The great Greek scorer Vassilis Goumas, had the best years of his career in the '70s.

== The 1980s ==
=== "The Emperor" dynasty of Aris ===
The decade of the 1980s began with another run of dominance by Panathinaikos in men's club basketball. They won the first 3 championships of the decade (1980, 1981, and 1982). In 1983, Aris won the Greek League championship, being led by its legendary scorer Nikos Galis. Panathinaikos won the championship again in 1984, beginning the decade by winning 4 of the first 5 Greek League championships.

Panathionaikos' great team to begin the decade of the 1980s, featured players like: Apostolos Kontos, Dimitris Kokolakis, Takis Koroneos, David Stergakos, Memos Ioannou, and Liveris Andritsos. After that, the legendary Aris Greek League dynasty of the 1980s, which was called, "The Emperor" rose.

Aris won the Greek League championship in every remaining year of the decade, and also won the first two championships of the 1990s (1985, 1986, 1987, 1988, 1989, 1990, and 1991). Aris also dominated the Greek Cup in the last half of the decade, as they won it in 1987, 1988, and 1989, and added two of the first three cups of the 1990s as well (1990, 1992). Aris also had good success on the European-wide level in this era, as they made it to the top-tier level EuroLeague Final Four in 3 straight years, 1988 EuroLeague Final Four, 1989 EuroLeague Final Four, and 1990 EuroLeague Final Four.

During these years, Aris was coached by Giannis Ioannidis, and was led by the legendary Greek players Nikos Galis and Panagiotis Giannakis. During the club's dynasty, it also featured players like: Lefteris Subotić, Nikos Filippou, Vangelis Vourtzoumis, Vassilis Lipiridis, Georgios Doxakis, Manthos Katsoulis, and Michalis Romanidis. At one point during Aris' Greek League dynasty, the club was so dominant, that it won 80 consecutive games in the top-tier level Greek League, from 1985 to 1989.

=== The rise of the Greece men's national team ===
The Greece men's national basketball team qualified for the 1986 FIBA World Cup, and finished the tournament in 10th place. The top 10 world finish in 1986, was a prelude to the long success that was to come for the Greece men's national team. The next year, Greece hosted the 1987 EuroBasket, and the Greece national team won the tournament's gold medal. During the tournament, they had wins over the legendary 1980s European national teams of the Soviet Union and Yugoslavia. Greek basketball player Nikos Galis was named the tournament's MVP.

Greece then won the silver medal at the next EuroBasket tournament, 1989 EuroBasket. Over the two EuroBasket tournaments of 1987 and 1989, Greece had a total of four wins against the Soviet Union (twice) and Yugoslavia (twice). This established Greece's senior men's national team, as one of the top 4 best national teams in the world at the time, along with the USA, Soviet Union, and Yugoslavia. During this era, Greece's senior national team was led by great players like Nikos Galis, Panagiotis Giannakis, Panagiotis Fasoulas, and Fanis Christodoulou.

== The 1990s ==
=== The rise of the Greek League to the top of Europe ===
In Greek men's club basketball, the 1990s started off with the ending of the great Aris dynasty of the 1980s. At the tail end of its dynasty, Aris won the Greek League championship in 1990 and 1991, the Greek Cup title in 1992, and the European-wide 2nd-tier level FIBA Saporta Cup, in 1993. They also won the European-wide 3rd-tier level FIBA Korać Cup in 1997, and the Greek Cup in 1998. Aris' main rivals, PAOK, also had a lot of success around this time.

PAOK won the Greek League championship in 1992, the Greek Cup in 1995, the European-wide 2nd-tier level Saporta Cup, in 1991, and the European-wide 3rd-tier level FIBA Korać Cup, in 1994. They also played at the 1993 EuroLeague Final Four. In those days, PAOK was coached by Dušan Ivković and Soulis Markopoulos, and featured players like: Bane Prelević, Walter Berry, Panagiotis Fasoulas, Cliff Levingston, Ken Barlow, Zoran Savić, Efthimis Rentzias, and Peja Stojaković. Then it was the biggest Greek clubs, Olympiacos and Panathinaikos, that began to have a lot of success in Greece and Europe.

Olympiacos won 5 straight Greek League championships, from 1993 to 1997, forming its own Greek League dynasty in the 1990s. They also won 2 Greek Cups, in 1994 and 1997. In this same time period, they made it to the EuroLeague Final Four in 1994, 1995, 1997, and 1999. They played in the EuroLeague Final in 1994, 1995, and 1997. In 1997, they won the Triple Crown in basketball, as they won the Greek League, the Greek Cup, and the EuroLeague, all in the same season, becoming the first Greek team to do so. In those years, Olympiacos was coached by Giannis Ioannidis and Dušan Ivković, and featured players like: Žarko Paspalj, Walter Berry, Argiris Kambouris, Georgios Sigalas, Franko Nakić, Milan Tomić, Dragan Tarlać, Roy Tarpley, Panagiotis Fasoulas, Efthimis Bakatsias, Eddie Johnson, Sasha Volkov, David Rivers, Nasos Galakteros, Willie Anderson, Dimitris Papanikolaou, Chris Welp, and Aleksey Savrasenko.

These players were naturalized as "homogeneis" ( Greeks) and did not take up a foreign player spot in the Greek league:Milan Tomić: Played as a Greek under the Greek name Giannakopoulos.Dragan Tarlać: Played as a Greek under the Greek name Konstantinidis.Franko Nakić: Played normally as a Greek with Greek citizenship.Aleksey Savrasenko: Played as a Greek under the Greek name Aman.Žarko Paspalj (only at the end): Played most of his career in Greece (Olympiacos, Panathinaikos, Panionios) as a foreigner. He obtained Greek citizenship in 1998 and played for Aris as a Greek during the 1998-99 season.Played as "Europeans / Bosman Players"These players did not hold a Greek passport, but they did not take up a foreign (American) player spot after 1996, as they held a passport from a European Union country:Chris Welp: German center, played for Olympiacos (1996-97) as a Bosman player (after the Bosman ruling).Sasha Volkov: Ukrainian forward. He played as a foreigner for Panathinaikos (1993-94). When he moved to Olympiacos (1994-95), he acquired a passport as a Black Sea Greek, while later (after 1996) he also made use of the European regulations..

While Olympiacos was dominating in Greece, and having great success in Europe, Panathinaikos also had great success in Europe. Panathinaikos made the EuroLeague Final Four in 1994, 1995, and 1996. In 1996, they won the EuroLeague championship, and became the first Greek team to ever win Europe's top-tier level basketball club championship. The 1996 EuroLeague champion team was coached by Božidar Maljković, and featured players like: Fragiskos Alvertis, Dominique Wilkins, Stojko Vranković, Panagiotis Giannakis, Michael Koch, and Nikos Oikonomou.

These players were naturalized as "homogeneis" ( Greeks) and did not take up a foreign player spot in the Greek league: 1. Tiit Sokk Status: Greek (as naturalized diaspora Greek / "homogenis").How he played: The Estonian Olympic gold medalist arrived in 1992. He was presented as a diaspora Greek from Estonia under the Greek name Titos Sokopoulos. He played normally as a Greek until 1996, without taking up a foreign player spot.2. Miroslav Pecarski Status: Greek (as naturalized diaspora Greek / "homogenis").How he played: The Serbian center was acquired in 1993. He obtained a Greek passport as a diaspora Greek and competed in the Greek league under the name Miroslav Mylonas, freeing up a spot for the team's American players.3. Jānis Ādamsons Status: Greek (as naturalized diaspora Greek / "homogenis").How he played: A Latvian guard acquired in the mid-1990s. He immediately received a Greek passport and played exclusively as a Greek, mostly serving as a utility player in practices and deep on the bench. 4. Michael Koch Status: Greek (via Cyprus).How he played: He arrived in 1996 as a German Bosman player. Shortly after, to free up a spot on the domestic roster, he was legally adopted by a Cypriot. He acquired a Cypriot passport, and since Cypriots held domestic player status in Greece, he played as a Greek. 5. Igor Kokoškov Status: Greek (as naturalized diaspora Greek / "homogenis").How he played: The Serbian guard (not to be confused with coach Igor Kokoškov) was acquired in 1998 from Vojvodina. He received a Greek passport and played as a Greek in the A1 league, providing backcourt solutions under Obradović. 6. Dušan Jelić Status: Greek (as naturalized diaspora Greek / "homogenis").How he played: The Serbian center was acquired in 2001. He had already obtained a Greek passport since the mid-1990s (while playing for Panionios) under the Greek name Dušan Koutsopoulos and played for Panathinaikos as a domestic player.

AEK Athens also made it to the EuroLeague Finals in 1998. It was during the 1990s, that the Greek League was widely considered to be the best men's club national domestic basketball league in Europe. The Greek Women's Cup also began in the 1990s, as it started with the 1995–96 season.

== The 2000s ==
=== "The Empire" dynasty of Panathinaikos ===
The decade of the 2000s in Greek basketball was marked by the dominance of Panathinaikos at the men's top-tier club level. Panathinaikos' dynasty began at the end of the 1990s, when they won the Greek League championship in 1998 and 1999, following their EuroLeague championship in 1996. They then won the Greek League championship in 2000 and 2001, making it a run of 4 straight Greek League championships.

Their 1998 and 1999 Greek League championship teams were coached by Lefteris Subotić. Starting with the 1999–00 season, the legendary Serbian coach, Željko Obradović, became the club's head coach. Under Obradović, the club also won the 2000 EuroLeague championship, played in the finals of the 2001 FIBA SuproLeague, and won the 2002 EuroLeague championship. In those years (1997–98 to 2001–02), Panathinaijos featured players like: Fragiskos Alvertis, Dino Rađja, Byron Scott, Fanis Christodoulou, Nikos Oikonomou, Antonis Fotsis, Georgios Kalaitzis, Nando Gentile, Nikos Boudouris, Željko Rebrača, Johnny Rogers, Oded Kattash, Darryl Middleton, İbrahim Kutluay, Lazaros Papadopoulos, Giannis Giannoulis, Pepe Sánchez, Michael Koch, and the great Serbian legend, Dejan Bodiroga.

In 2002, AEK Athens briefly stopped the Panathinaikos run of 4 straight championships, as they won the 2002 Greek League championship. AEK also won the Greek Cup title in 2000 and 2001. In those years, AEK was coached by Dušan Ivković and Dragan Šakota, and featured players like: İbrahim Kutluay, Andrew Betts, Michalis Kakiouzis, Dimos Dikoudis, Martin Müürsepp, Nikos Chatzis, Geert Hammink, J. R. Holden, Christos Tapoutos, Jim Bilba, Ioannis Bourousis, Pero Antić, Arijan Komazec, Chris Carr, and Nikos Zisis.

Panathinaikos then continued their dominance under coach Obradović, winning the next 9 straight Greek League championships (2003, 2004, 2005, 2006, 2007, 2008, 2009, 2010, and 2011). They also won the Greek Cup title in 2003, 2005, 2006, 2007, 2008, and 2009. In addition to that, Panathinaikos won the EuroLeague championship in 2007, the EuroLeague championship in 2009, and added the EuroLeague championship in 2011, to begin the next decade.

They also won the Triple Crown, in 2007 and 2009. This was the high point period of the club's great dynasty. During these years, the club featured several well-known players, such as: Dimitris Diamantidis, Antonis Fotsis, Kostas Tsartsaris, Dimos Dikoudis, Mike Batiste, Sani Bečirovič, Drew Nicholas, Dušan Kecman, Giorgi Shermadini, Stratos Perperoglou, Šarūnas Jasikevičius, Nikos Chatzivrettas, Dejan Tomašević, Nikola Peković, Ramūnas Šiškauskas, and Vassilis Spanoulis.

=== The big successes of the Greek men's national team ===
During the 2000s, the Greece men's national basketball team was consistently ranked among the top 4-5 best national teams in the world, by the FIBA World Rankings. During this time, Greece had numerous top 5 place finishes in all of the world's three biggest and most important senior level tournaments, the FIBA EuroBasket, the FIBA World Cup, and the Summer Olympic Games.

From 2003, to 2009, Greece had an impressive run of top 5 finishes in the three biggest FIBA tournaments – under head coach Giannis Ioannidis, Greece finished in 5th place in Europe, at the 2003 EuroBasket. Then, under head coach Panagiotis Giannakis, Greece finished in 5th place in the world at the 2004 Summer Olympics. Following that, Greece finished 1st in Europe, as they won the gold medal at the 2005 EuroBasket; and then they finished 2nd in the world, as they won the silver medal at the 2006 FIBA World Cup, where they also beat Team USA.

They followed that up with a 4th-place finish in Europe, at the 2007 EuroBasket, a 5th-place finish in the world, at the 2008 Summer Olympics, and a 3rd-place finish in Europe, at the 2009 EuroBasket. The 2005 and 2006 medal-winning teams were coached by Giannakis, and featured players like: Dimitris Diamantidis, Theo Papaloukas, Vassilis Spanoulis, Nikos Zisis, Lazaros Papadopoulos, Michalis Kakiouzis, Dimos Dikoudis, Antonis Fotsis, Kostas Tsartsaris, Nikos Chatzivrettas, Ioannis Bourousis, Sofoklis Schortsanitis, and Panagiotis Vasilopoulos. The 2009 medal-winning team was coached by Lithuanian Jonas Kazlauskas, and returned Spanoulis, Zisis, Fotsis, Bourousis, and Schortsanitis, from the earlier medal-winning teams. Only Spanoulis, Zisis, and Fotsis, were a part of all three of the medal-winning teams.

== Professional national club competitions ==
=== The Greek Basket League ===
Official Greek Basketball League name sponsor English version logo

The first official men's basketball championship in Greece was held in the 1927–28 season. Until 1963 however, there was no unified national championship, and the champion was chosen through games between the regional champions. In 1963, the A National Category (Greek: Α' Εθνική Κατηγορία) was created. In 1992, the championship abandoned its amateur status and was officially recognized by FIBA Europe as a fully professional league under the name HEBA A1 (ΕΣΑΚΕ Α1), organized by the Hellenic Basketball Clubs Association (HEBA). The league now operates under the name of Greek Basket League.

The Basket League is ranked as one of the 5 "A" level national domestic leagues in European basketball by the European national basketball league rankings, and was considered Europe's best pro national domestic league during the 1990s. This professional league consists of 14 teams. Under the regulations, the bottom two teams at the end of the regular season are relegated to the Greek A2 Basket League (Ελληνική Α2 καλαθοσφαίρισης), while conversely, the top two teams from the A2 are promoted to the Basket League. The first placing 8 teams of the regular season qualify for the league's playoffs.

=== Greek Women's Basketball League ===
The Greek Women's Basket League began in 1967, and consists of 12 teams. The Women's A National Category (Α' Εθνικής Κατηγορίας Γυναικών) began with the 1984–85 season, and it became known as the Women's A1 National Category (Α1 Εθνικής Κατηγορίας Γυναικών) in 1997.

== Cup competitions ==
The men's Greek Basketball Super Cup was held for the first time in 2020.

The men's Greek Basketball Cup was held for the first time in 1976. After 45 cups, Panathinaikos has won the most Greek Cups with 19. From 1995 to 2004, the tournament was held in a Final Four style tournament. It is organized by the Hellenic Basketball Federation (E.O.K.).

In the women's competition, the cup tournament was first held in the year 1996.

== Successes of the pro club teams ==
Greek men's professional basketball teams have a total of 29 appearances in the finals of European cup competitions, of which they have won a total of 18 trophies. One of the greatest achievements of Greek basketball are the victories of Panathinaikos (1996, 2000, 2002, 2007, 2009, 2011, 2024) and Olympiacos (1997, 2012, 2013) in the Finals of the 1st-tier level men's EuroLeague competition. Panathinaikos also won the international worldwide club title, the FIBA Club World Cup competition, in the year 1996. Olympiacos also won the same title in 2013. AEK Athens also won that title in 2019.

== International titles won – men's club teams ==
Panathinaikos

- EuroLeague: 7 (1995–96, 1999–00, 2001–02, 2006–07, 2008–09, 2010–11, 2024)
- FIBA Intercontinental Cup: 1 (1996)

Olympiacos

- EuroLeague: 4 (1996–97, 2011–12, 2012–13, 2025–26)
- FIBA Intercontinental Cup: 1 (2013)

AEK

- FIBA Saporta Cup: 2 (1967–68, 1999–00)
- FIBA Champions League: 1 (2017–18)
- FIBA Intercontinental Cup: 1 (2019)

Aris

- FIBA Saporta Cup: 1 (1992–93)
- FIBA Korać Cup: 1 (1996–97)
- FIBA EuroCup Challenge: 1 (2002–03)

PAOK

- FIBA Saporta Cup: 1 (1990–91)
- FIBA Korać Cup: 1 (1993–94)

Maroussi

- FIBA Saporta Cup: 1 (2000–01)

== International titles won – women's club teams ==
Athinaikos

- FIBA EuroCup Women: 1 (2009–10)

== International successes of the Greece national basketball teams ==
Since winning the Greece men's basketball 1987 EuroBasket, the record of Greece national basketball shows numerous successes. The men's national youth teams especially have recorded successes in international competitions.

=== Successes of the men's national team ===
Since the Greece men's national basketball team won its first FIBA EuroBasket gold medal in 1987, it has been a regular competitor at the EuroBasket, FIBA World Cup, and the Summer Olympics. The men's national team from 1987 included legendary players such as: Nikos Galis, Panagiotis Giannakis, Panagiotis Fasoulas, and Fanis Christodoulou. Panagiotis Giannakis also later became the senior team's head coach, and he led the Greeks to win the European Championship (EuroBasket) again, in the year 2005, at Belgrade. Giannakis became the first person to have succeeded in winning the FIBA European Championship (EuroBasket), both as a player and as a head coach. After the Greece national football team had earlier in 2004, won the European Championship in football, it gave Greece the rare distinction of being the European champion in the two most important team ball sports at the same time. At the 2006 FIBA World Cup held in Japan, Greece reached the final, and won the silver medal. They accomplished this after becoming the only team at the tournament to beat Team USA, whom they defeated in the semifinals, by a score of 101–95.

Greece's senior men's team then won the bronze medal at the 2009 EuroBasket.

== Medals ==
=== Senior national teams ===
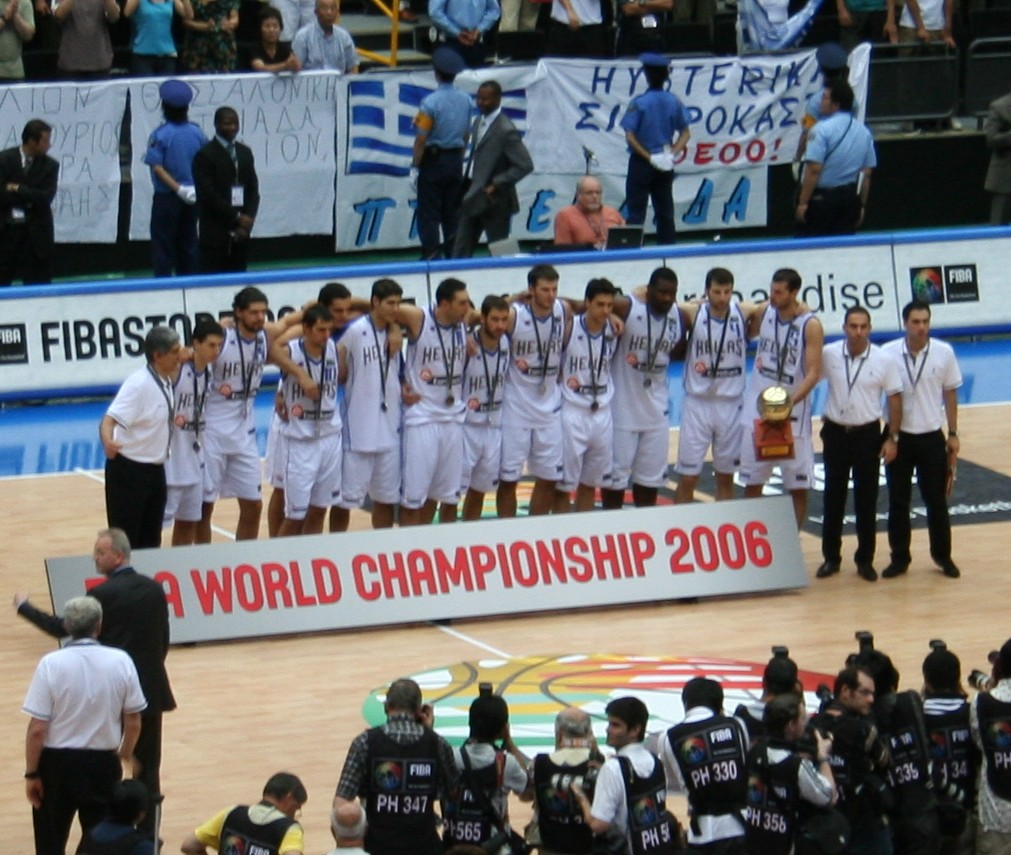
2006 FIBA World Cup: the Greece national team won the silver medal.

The Greece men's national basketball team took part in its first FIBA European Championship (EuroBasket) at the 1949 EuroBasket, where they won the bronze medal. Greece's first big success as a nation in basketball was when their senior men's national team won the gold medal at the 1987 EuroBasket, which led to a breakthrough for the sport of basketball in the country. In the 1987 EuroBasket tournament's final, which was played in Piraeus, at Peace and Friendship Stadium (SEF), Greece defeated the heavily favored Soviet national basketball team (which included star player Šarūnas Marčiulionis) in overtime, by a score of 103 to 101.

The MVP of that EuroBasket was Nikos Galis, who to this day, still remains one of the biggest sports icons in Greece. In the subsequent EuroBasket tournament in 1989, Greece again reached the final, where they lost to the Yugoslavia national team, which led by its star player, Dražen Petrović, went undefeated during the tournament. By taking the silver medal at the 1989 EuroBasket, Greece cemented its position among Europe's leading basketball nations.

Greece also won the gold medal at the 2005 EuroBasket, which was held in Serbia, after defeating Dirk Nowitzki-led Germany, in the finals, by a score of 78 to 62.

Greece's senior men's national basketball team took part in the World Cup for the first time at the 1986 tournament, where they finished in tenth place. Greece made it to the semifinals of both the 1994 FIBA World Cup and the 1998 FIBA World Cup, which Greece also hosted. At the 2006 FIBA World Cup, which was held in Japan, Greece won the silver medal, after defeating the heavily favored USA, by a score of 101 to 95 in the semifinals. Greece also took the bronze medal at the 2009 EuroBasket.

=== Junior national teams ===
The Greek Under-19 national team won the gold medal at the 1995 FIBA Under-19 World Cup. As the tournament's host nation, the Greece's Under-19 national team won the gold medal, by defeating the Australian Under-19 national team, by a score of 91–73 in the final. The Greek gold medal-winning under-19 team of 1995 included such players as: Michalis Kakiouzis, Nikos Chatzis, Georgios Kalaitzis, Dimitris Papanikolaou, Georgios Karagkoutis, Vassilis Soulis, Dimitris Despos, and Efthimis Rentzias, who was voted the MVP of the tournament.

=== Mediterranean Games ===
Greece has often taken part in the Mediterranean Games. The greatest success of the men's national team at the Mediterranean Games is the gold medal, which they won in 1979. Furthermore, Greece has won four silver medals at the tournament, in the years 1991, 2001, 2005, and 2009. In addition to that, they have also won three bronze medals at the tournament, in the years 1955, 1971, and 1987.

The Greek women's national team won the bronze medal at the competition in 1991.

== Arenas ==
Peace and Friendship Stadium, home arena of Olympiacos Piraeus.

Nikos Galis OAKA Indoor Hall, home arena of Panathinaikos Athens.

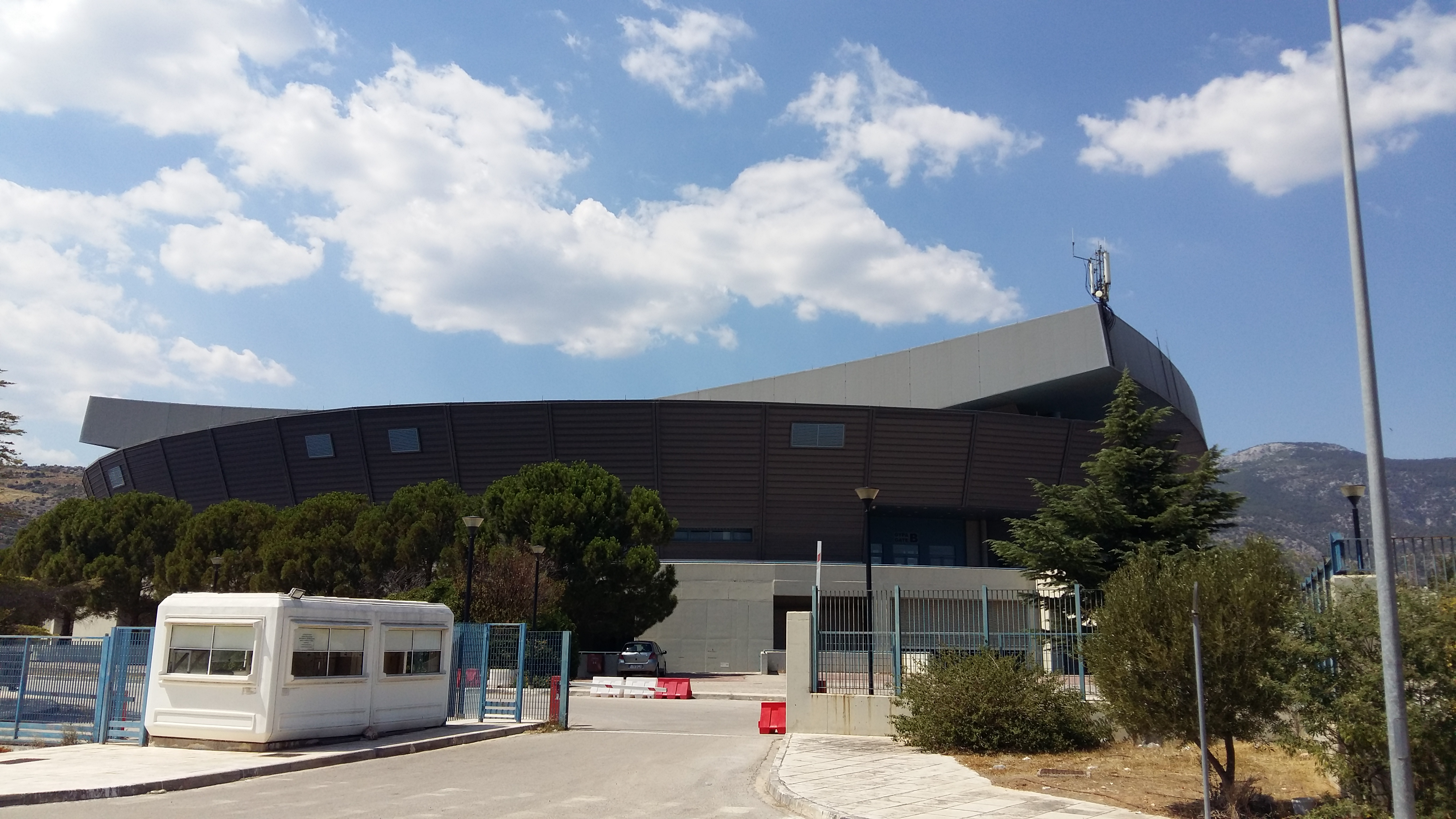
Ano Liosia Olympic Hall, home arena of AEK Athens.

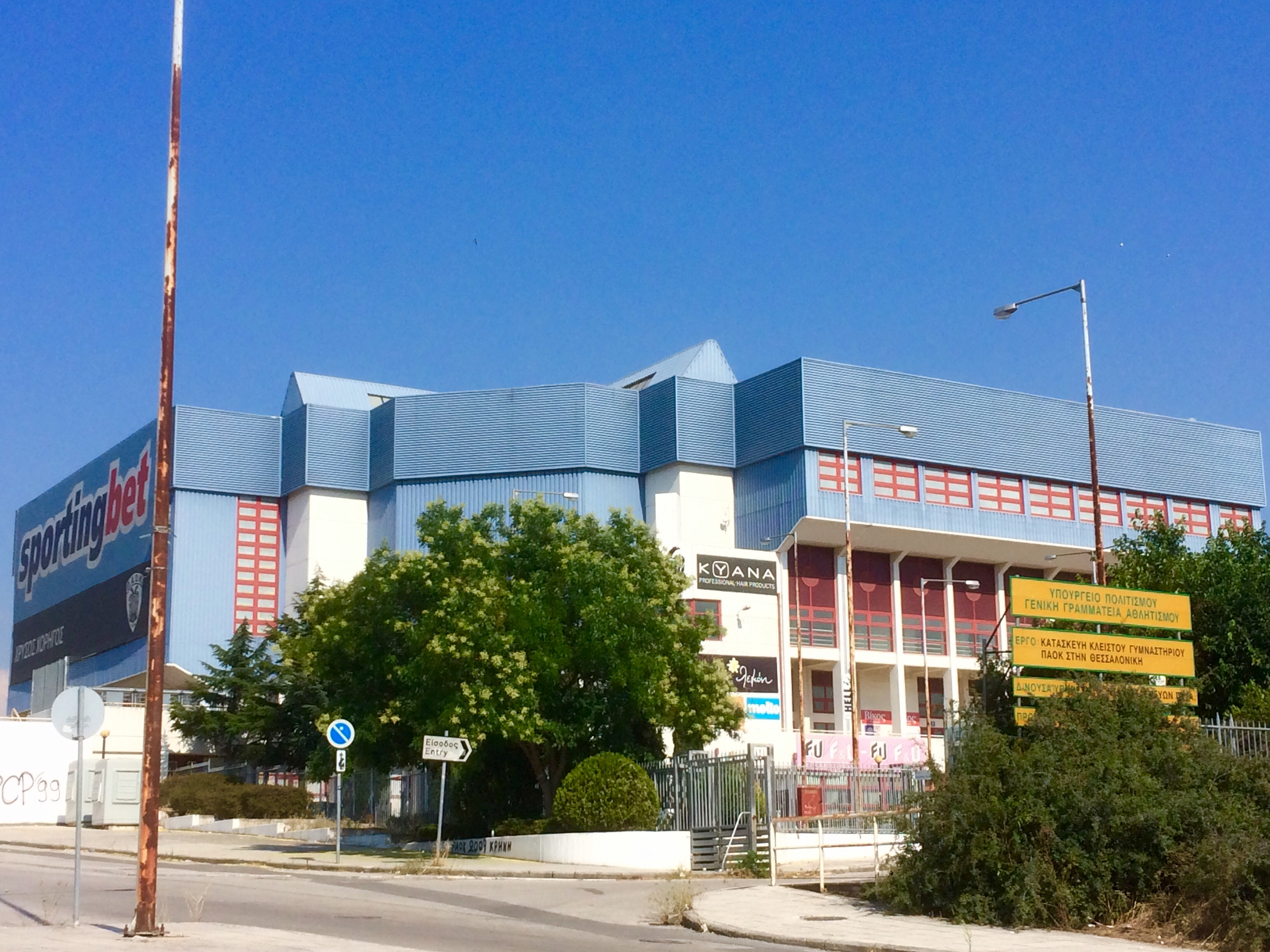
PAOK Sports Arena, home arena of PAOK Thessaloniki.

The first professional basketball indoor arena in the country was opened in 1959, in Athens. Located at the Leoforos Alexandras Stadium, the Pavlos and Thanasis Giannakopoulos Indoor Hall holds 1,500 spectators, and is still home to the ladies' basketball department of Panathinaikos. Because of its confined environment, the sports hall was named The Tomb of The Indian, after the Fritz Lang feature film The Indian Tomb. In the subsequent years, a number of other arenas have arisen in Greece, located mainly in Athens and Thessaloniki. In 1966, in Thessaloniki, the Alexandreio Melathron was opened. This 5,138-seat arena (can hold up to 7,000 with temporary seating) was for decades home to both of the two arch-rivals Aris and PAOK.

The Peace and Friendship Stadium (SEF), originally a 17,000 capacity (later reduced to 12,000) multi-purpose hall, opened in Piraeus, Athens in 1985. The arena was for the next ten years, the biggest indoor sports hall in Greece, and it hosted events such as the 1987 EuroBasket, the 1994 World Volleyball Championship, the 1995 European Volleyball Championship, the 1998 FIBA World Cup, and the 1999 Olympic Weightlifting World Championship. SEF is the home of the Olympiacos men's basketball club.

Peristeri's home arena, the 4,000 capacity Peristeri Indoor Hall, opened up in 1989. By the early 1990s, the sport of basketball had become well established in Greece, and the Greek Basket League had become the strongest professional national domestic league in Europe, as well as the richest. A rising number of television viewers in Greece were watching the league, there was a high level of Greek media interest in the sport, and the application of the country to host major sports events had left many of the nation's existing gyms too old and too small for the times. So, in Athens, the Nikos Galis Olympic Indoor Hall was opened in 1995. It holds 19,250 spectators (21,098 standing room capacity), and it is still one of the two biggest indoor sports halls in Europe, where regular basketball games are held. The Nikos Galis Olympic Indoor Hall has hosted the 1995 FIBA Under-19 World Cup, the 1995 EuroBasket, the 1998 FIBA World Cup, and the 2004 Summer Olympics. Currently, the men's club Panathinaikos plays its home games in the Olympic Hall. the men's sections of AEK Athens and Maroussi have also played home games there.

Also in 1995, the 4,200 capacity (expandable to 5,500) arena Larrisa Neapolis, and the 4,200 capacity arena Dimitris Tofalos were built. The Greek club Larissa has recently used the Larissa Neapolis Arena to host its home games, while the Greek club Promitheas Patras, has recently used the Dimitris Tofalos Arena to host its home games. In 2000, the first modern indoor sports arena in Thessaloniki was built, P.A.O.K. Sports Arena. The arena is under the possession of PAOK, and it holds 8,500 spectators. For the 2004 Summer Olympics, the Helliniko Indoor Arena was built. It holds 15,000 spectators, and has been used at various times, as the home arena of the Greek men's clubs Panionios, Panellinios, and AEK Athens.

In 2004, the 10,000 seat Ano Liosia Olympic Hall was completed. It currently hosts the home games of AEK Athens. Panionios' new 4,200-seat arena, the Boban Janković Indoor Hall, is scheduled to open up in 2021.

== Major basketball events in Greece ==
Greece is the host of the Acropolis International Basketball Tournament, which takes place most years in Athens, since 1986. Specifically, these are:

Men's competitions:

- FIBA Saporta Cup Finals (4×): 1968, 1972, 1973, 1989
- EuroLeague Finals (4×): 1985, 1993, 2000, 2007
- EuroBasket (2×): 1987, 1995
- EuroLeague Final Four (3×): 1993, 2000, 2007
- FIBA Korać Cup Finals (2×): 1994, 1997
- FIBA World Cup: 1998
- Summer Olympics: 2004
- FIBA EuroCup Challenge Final Four: 2003
- FIBA Champions League Final Four (2×): 2018, 2020

Women's competitions:

- EuroLeague (2×): 1987, 1997
- EuroBasket: 2003
- Summer Olympics: 2004

== Notable Greek basketball players ==
The following is a list of some notable Greek basketball players and some of their important career accomplishments:

- Men, in alphabetical order:

=== Fragiskos Alvertis ===
- 5× EuroLeague champion: 1996, 2000, 2002, 2007, 2009
- 11× Greek League champion: 1998, 1999, 2000, 2001, 2003, 2004, 2005, 2006, 2007, 2008, 2009
- 8× Greek Cup winner: 1993, 1996, 2003, 2005, 2006, 2007, 2008, 2009
- EuroLeague All-Final Four Team: 1996
- FIBA Club World Cup champion: 1996
- Greek Cup MVP: 2003
- Greek League MVP: 2003
- 50 Greatest EuroLeague Contributors: 2008

=== Giannis Antetokounmpo ===
- NBA Champion (2021)
- NBA Finals MVP (2021)
- 2× NBA Most Valuable Player (2019, 2020)
- NBA Defensive Player of the Year (2020)
- NBA Most Improved Player (2017)
- NBA All-Star Game MVP (2021)
- 5× All-NBA First Team (2019–2023)
- 2022 FIBA Eurobasket All-Tournament team
- 2× All-NBA Second Team (2017, 2018)
- 7× NBA All-Star (2017–2023)
- 4× NBA All-Defensive First Team (2019–2022)
- NBA All-Defensive Second Team (2017)
- NBA All-Rookie Second Team (2014)
- NBA 75th Anniversary Team
- Euroscar Player of the Year (2018)
- Drafted with the fifteenth pick, in the first round, in the 2013 NBA draft.
- NBA player (Milwaukee Bucks): 2013–present

=== Ioannis Bourousis ===
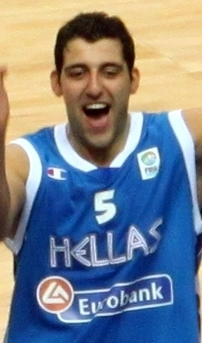
Ioannis Bourousis

- EuroLeague champion: 2015
- 2× Greek League champion: 2002, 2017
- 3× Greek Cup winner: 2010, 2011, 2017
- Spanish League champion: 2015
- 2× Spanish Cup winner: 2014, 2015
- 2× Spanish Supercup winner: 2013, 2014
- Triple Crown winner: 2015
- EuroBasket Gold: 2005
- EuroBasket Bronze: 2009
- 2× All-EuroLeague Team: 2009, 2016
- Spanish League MVP: 2016
- All-Spanish League Team: 2016
- 3× Greek League Best Five: 2008, 2009, 2011

=== Fanis Christodoulou ===
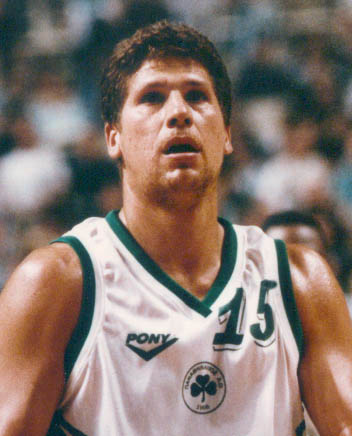
Fanis Christodoulou

- Greek League MVP: 1993
- Greek League champion: 1998
- Greek Cup winner: 1991
- EuroBasket Gold: 1987
- EuroBasket Silver: 1989
- 2× EuroBasket All-Tournament Team: 1993, 1995
- A candidate for the FIBA Hall of Fame

=== Dimitris Diamantidis ===
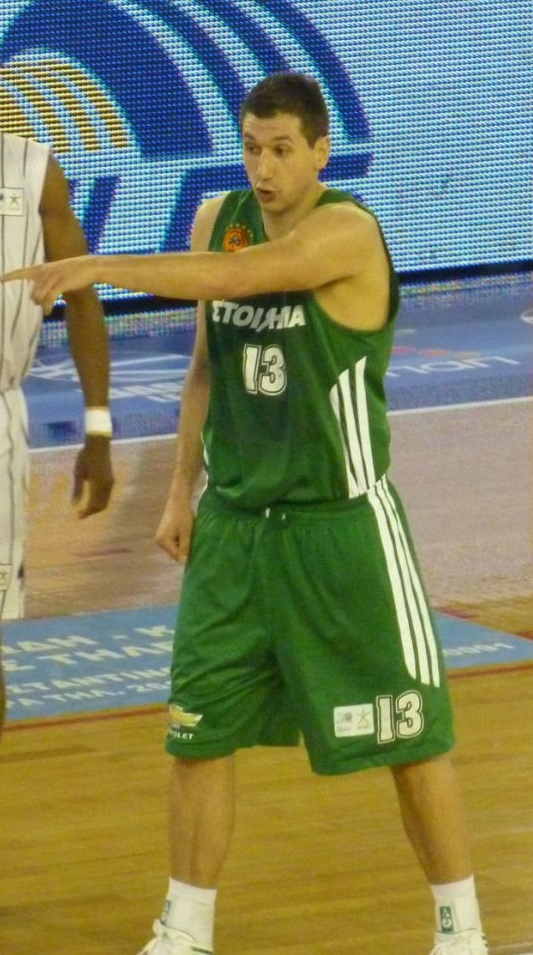
Dimitris Diamantidis

- 3× EuroLeague champion: 2007, 2009, 2011
- 9× Greek League champion: 2005, 2006, 2007, 2008, 2009, 2010, 2011, 2013, 2014
- 10x Greek Cup winner: 2005, 2006, 2007, 2008, 2009, 2012, 2013, 2014, 2015, 2016
- 2× Triple Crown winner: 2007, 2009
- 6× Greek League MVP: 2004, 2006–2008, 2011, 2014
- 6× Greek League Finals MVP: 2006–2009, 2011, 2014
- EuroLeague MVP: 2011
- 6× EuroLeague Best Defender: 2005–2009, 2011
- Greek League Best Defender: 2011
- 2× EuroLeague Assists Leader: 2011, 2014
- 5× Greek League Assists Leader: 2006, 2007, 2010, 2011, 2015
- EuroBasket Gold: 2005
- EuroBasket All-Tournament Team: 2005
- FIBA World Cup Silver: 2006
- 4× All-EuroLeague Team: 2007, 2011–2013
- 11× Greek League Best Five: 2004, 2005, 2006, 2007, 2008, 2010, 2011, 2012, 2013, 2014, 2016
- 2× EuroLeague Final Four MVP: 2007, 2011
- Mr. Europa: 2007
- 2× Greek Cup MVP: 2009, 2016
- Greek Athlete of the Year: 2007
- All-Europe Player of the Year: 2007
- EuroLeague 2001–10 All-Decade Team: 2010
- EuroLeague Legend: 2016

=== Panagiotis Fasoulas ===
- EuroLeague champion: (1997)
- FIBA Saporta Cup champion: (1991)
- 5× Greek League champion: (1992, 1994, 1995, 1996, 1997)
- 3× Greek Cup winner: (1984, 1994, 1997)
- 3× FIBA European Selection: (1990, 1991, 1995)
- FIBA EuroStar: (1996)
- 2× Greek League MVP: (1994, 1995)
- Greek League Finals MVP: (1992)
- Greek League Rebounding Leader: (1987)
- EuroBasket Gold: 1987
- EuroBasket Silver: 1989
- EuroBasket All-Tournament Team: (1987)
- FIBA Hall of Fame: (2016)

=== Antonis Fotsis ===
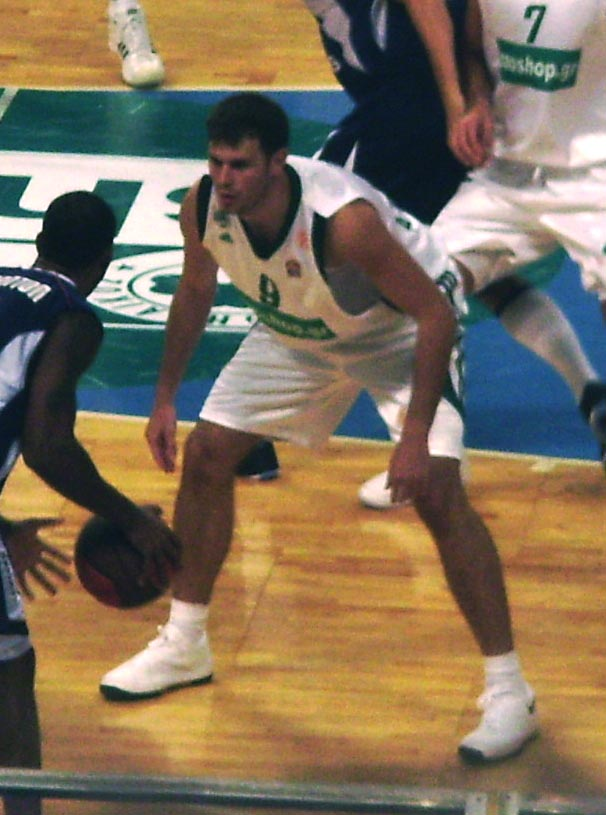
Antonis Fotsis

- 3× EuroLeague champion: 2000, 2009, 2011
- 10x Greek League champion: 1998, 1999, 2000, 2001, 2003, 2009, 2010, 2011, 2014, 2017
- 6× Greek Cup winner: 2003, 2009, 2014, 2015, 2016, 2017
- Spanish League champion: 2005
- EuroCup champion: 2006
- Triple Crown winner: 2009
- Greek League Best Young Player: 2001
- First Greek-born player to play in the NBA (Memphis Grizzlies): 2001–02
- EuroBasket Gold: 2005
- EuroBasket Bronze: 2009
- FIBA World Cup Silver: 2006

=== Nikos Galis ===
- EuroBasket Gold: 1987
- EuroBasket Silver: 1989
- EuroBasket MVP: 1987
- FIBA World Cup Top Scorer: 1986
- 4× EuroBasket Top Scorer: 1983, 1987, 1989, 1991
- 8× EuroLeague Top Scorer 1986–1992, 1994
- EuroLeague assists leader: 1994
- 8× Greek League champion: 1983, 1985–1991
- 7× Greek Cup winner: 1985, 1987–1990, 1992, 1993
- 5× Greek League MVP: 1988–1992
- 5× Greek League Finals MVP: 1987–1991
- 11× Greek League Top Scorer: 1981–1991
- 5× Greek Cup Finals Top Scorer: 1987, 1989, 1990, 1992, 1993
- 4× Greek League assists leader: 1991–1994
- Mr. Europa Award: 1987
- Euroscar: 1987
- FIBA European Selection: 1987
- FIBA Hall of Fame: 2007
- FIBA's 50 Greatest Players: 1991
- 50 Greatest EuroLeague Contributors: 2008
- Haggerty Award: 1979
- Seton Hall Athletic Hall of Fame: 1991
- Mediterranean Player of the Year: 1987
- Naismith Memorial Basketball Hall of Fame: 2017

=== Panagiotis Giannakis ===
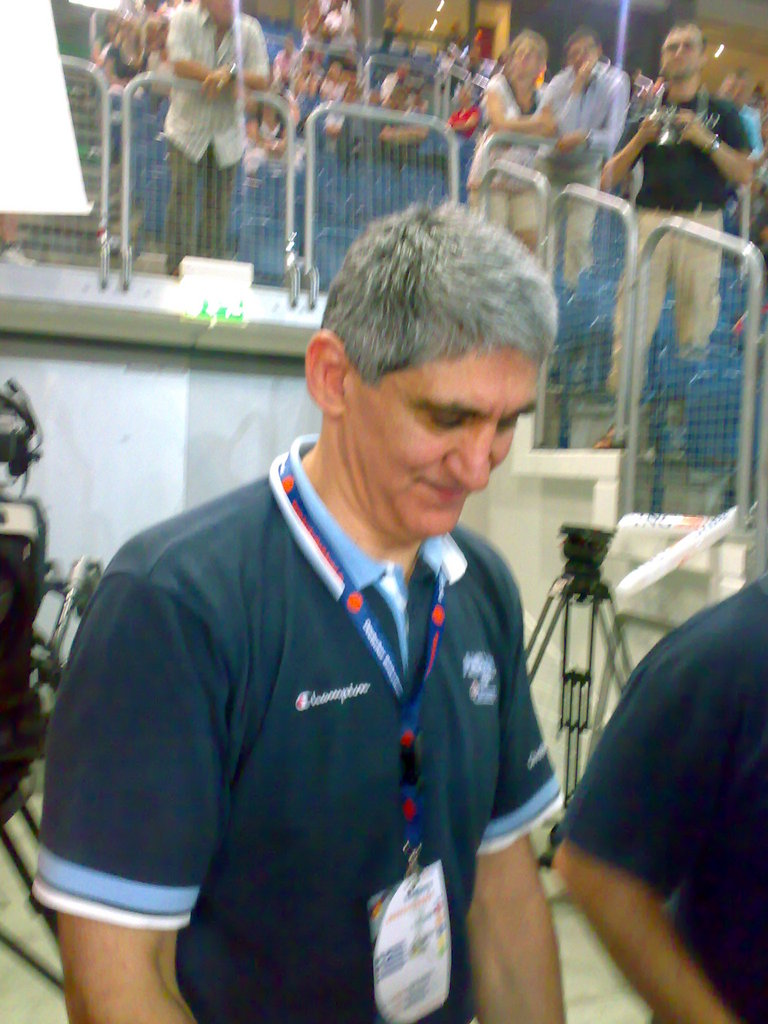
Panagiotis Giannakis

- EuroBasket Gold: 1987
- EuroBasket Silver: 1989
- FIBA Saporta Cup champion: 1993
- EuroLeague champion: 1996
- 7× Greek Cup winner: 1985, 1987, 1988, 1989, 1990, 1992, 1996
- 7× Greek League champion: 1985, 1986, 1987, 1988, 1989, 1990, 1991
- Greek League MVP: 1987
- 2× Greek Cup Finals Top Scorer: 1985, 1988
- 3× FIBA European Selection: 1980, 1987, 1990
- Greek League Top Scorer: 1980
- Greek League Assist leader: 1989
- Most capped Greece men's national basketball team player, with 351 games played.
- Greek senior men's national team all-time leading scorer.
- 50 Greatest EuroLeague Contributors: 2008
- A candidate for the FIBA Hall of Fame

=== Theo Papaloukas ===
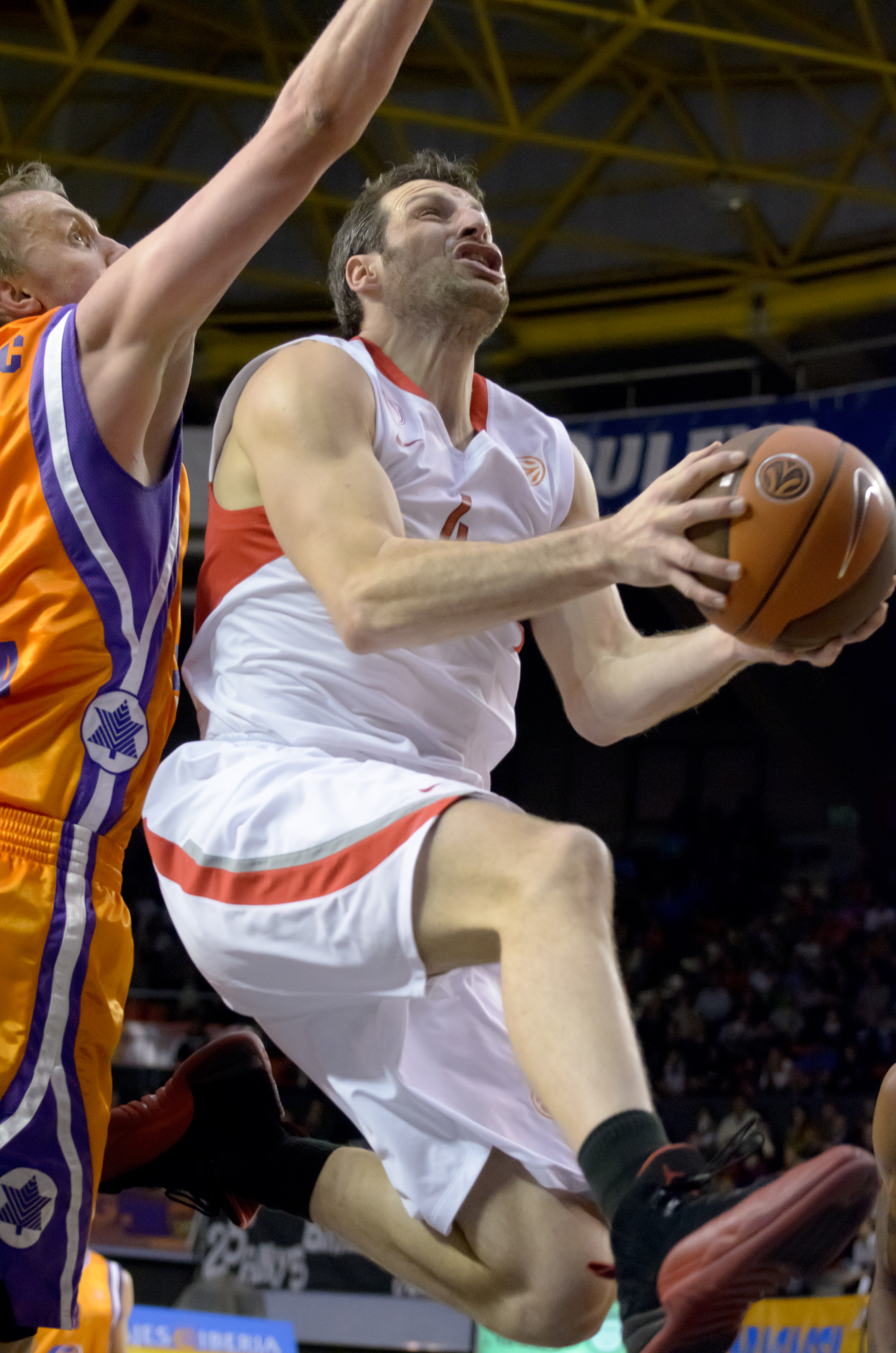
Theo Papaloukas

- EuroBasket Gold: 2005
- EuroBasket All-Tournament Team: 2005
- 3× Russian League Player of the Year: (2005, 2006, 2007)
- Russian Cup MVP: 2006
- 4× All-EuroLeague Team: 2006–2009
- 2× EuroLeague champion: 2006, 2008
- EuroLeague Final Four MVP: 2006
- Triple Crown winner: 2006
- FIBA World Cup Silver: 2006
- FIBA World Cup All-Tournament Team: 2006
- FIBA Europe Player of the Year: 2006
- EuroLeague MVP: 2007
- 50 Greatest EuroLeague Contributors: 2008
- EuroLeague 2001–10 All-Decade Team: 2010
- 3× Greek League assists leader: 2001, 2002, 2009
- 2× EuroLeague assists leader: 2007, 2009
- 3× Greek Cup winner: 2002, 2010, 2011
- 7× Russian League Champion: 2003–08, 2013
- 3× Russian Cup winner: 2005–07
- All-Europe Player of the Year: 2006
- Israeli State Cup winner: 2012
- Adriatic League champion: 2012
- Israeli Super League champion: 2012
- VTB United League champion: 2013
- EuroLeague Legend: 2013

=== Sofoklis Schortsanitis ===
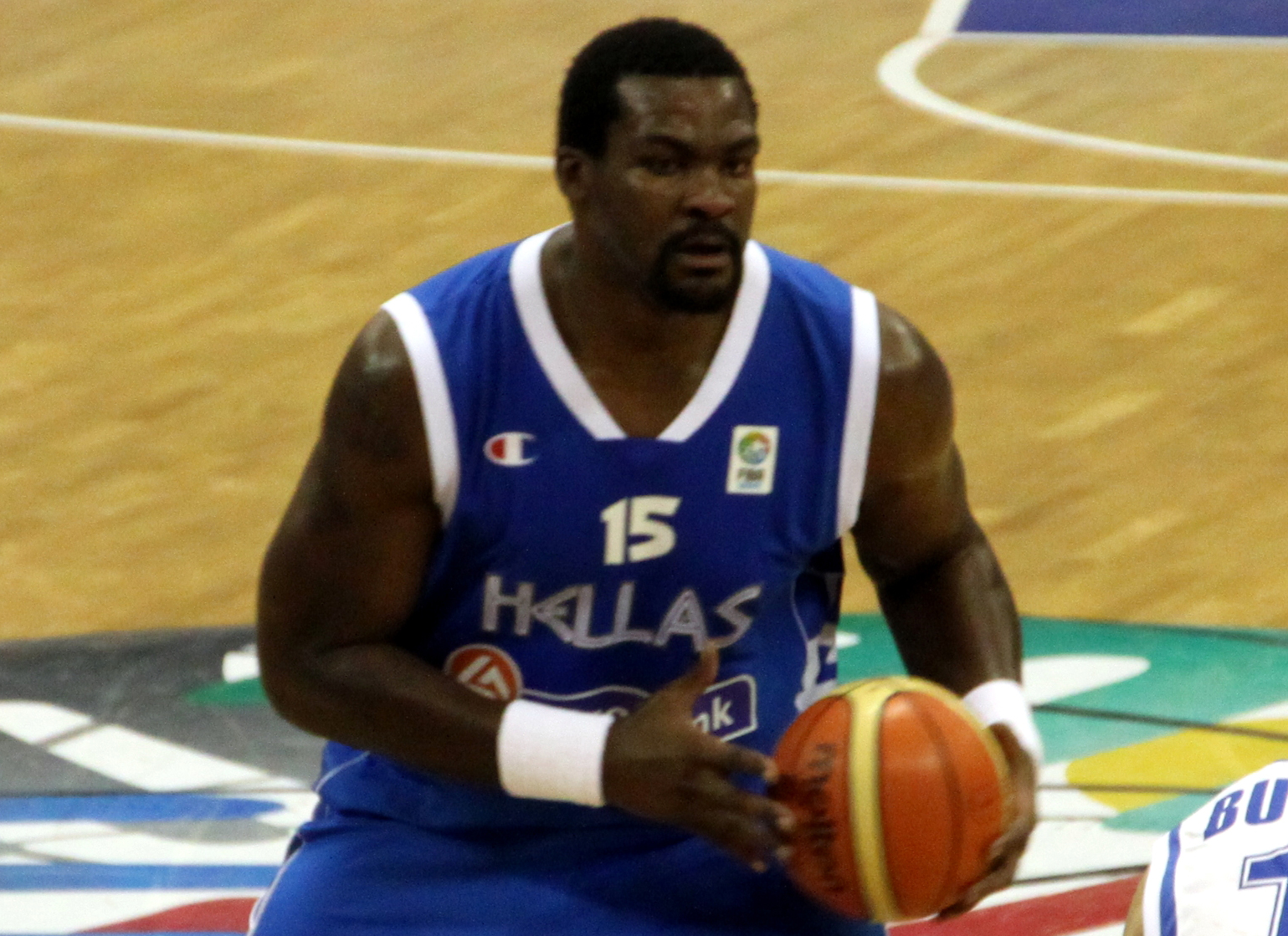
Sofoklis Schortsanitis

- Albert Schweitzer Tournament MVP: 2002
- FIBA World Cup Silver: 2006
- EuroBasket Bronze: 2009
- Greek League Best Five: 2006
- 2× Greek Cup winner: 2010, 2013
- 4× Israeli State Cup winner: 2011, 2012, 2014, 2015
- 3× Israeli Super League champion: 2011, 2012, 2014
- All-EuroLeague Team: 2011
- Adriatic League champion: 2012
- Greek League champion: 2013
- EuroLeague champion: 2014

=== Vassilis Spanoulis ===
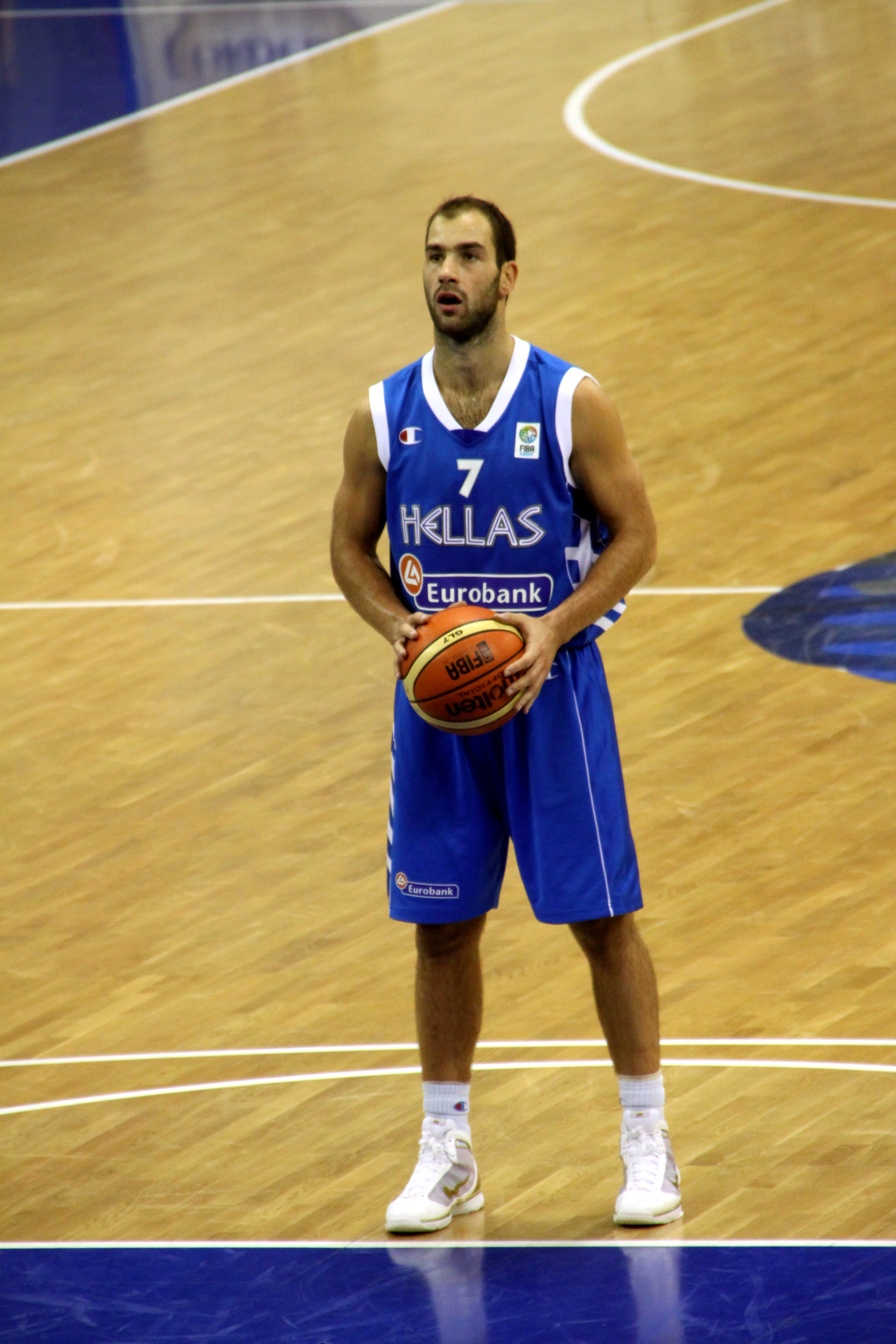
Vassilis Spanoulis

- EuroBasket Gold: 2005
- FIBA World Cup Silver: 2006
- EuroBasket Bronze: 2009
- EuroBasket All-Tournament Team: 2009
- 2× All-Europe Player of the Year: 2012, 2013
- 3× EuroLeague champion (2009, 2012, 2013)
- EuroLeague 2010–20 Player of the Decade (2020)
- EuroLeague MVP (2013)
- 3× EuroLeague Final Four MVP (2009, 2012, 2013)
- EuroLeague Finals Top Scorer (2013)
- 8× All-EuroLeague Team (2006, 2009, 2011–2015, 2018)
- FIBA Intercontinental Cup champion (2013)
- FIBA Intercontinental Cup MVP (2013)
- Giuseppe Sciacca Award – Vatican's World Athlete of the Year (2013)
- Balkan Athlete of the Year (2009)
- 7× Greek League champion (2006, 2008–2010, 2012, 2015, 2016)
- 4× Greek Cup winner (2006, 2008, 2009, 2011)
- 3× Greek League MVP (2009, 2012, 2016)
- 3× Greek League Finals MVP (2012, 2015, 2016)
- 10× All-Greek League Team: (2005, 2006, 2008, 2009, 2011–2013, 2015–2017)
- 10× Greek League All-Star (2005, 2006, 2008–2011, 2013, 2014, 2018, 2019)
- Greek League Best Young Player (2003)
- Greek League Most Improved Player (2004)
- 2× Greek League Most Popular Player (2015, 2017)
- Greek Cup Finals Top Scorer (2018)
- 5× Greek League assists leader (2005, 2008, 2012, 2013, 2015)
- 2× Acropolis Tournament MVP (2007, 2009)
- EuroLeague all-time leading scorer
- EuroLeague all-time leader in Performance Index Rating
- EuroLeague all-time leader in assists
- Professional Greek League all-time leading scorer
- Professional Greek League all-time leader in assists

=== Nikos Zisis ===
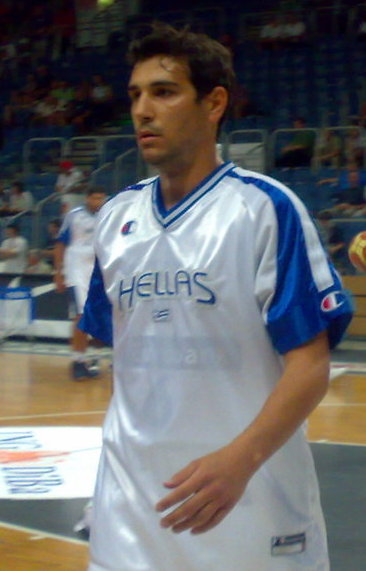
Nikos Zisis

- EuroLeague champion (2008)
- No. 6 retired by Brose Bamberg
- Jersey retired by XAN Thessaloniki
- Greek League champion (2002)
- 2× Greek Cup winner (2001, 2020)
- Greek Cup MVP (2020)
- Greek League Best Young Player (2002)
- 2× Greek League All-Star (2004, 2005)
- 4× Italian League champion (2006, 2010–2012)
- 4× Italian Cup winner (2007, 2010–2012)
- 4× Italian Cup Supercup winner (2007, 2010–2012)
- VTB United League champion (2008)
- 2× Russian League champion (2008, 2009)
- Russian Cup winner (2014)
- 2× German League champion (2016, 2017)
- 2× German Cup winner (2017, 2019)
- German Supercup winner (2015)
- German Cup Final MVP (2019)
- Acropolis Tournament MVP (2013)
- FIBA Young Player of The Year (2005)
- FIBA Under-20 European Championship MVP (2002)

== Ladies ==
Ladies, in alphabetical order:

=== Sofia Kligkopoulou ===
- 210 Greek women's national team caps.

=== Anastasia Kostaki ===
- First Greek WNBA player.

=== Evanthia Maltsi ===
- The Greek women's national team's all-time second leading scorer, with 3,215 points, and record holder with 214 Greek women's national team caps. Former WNBA player.

=== Polymnia Saregkou ===
- With 2,179 points, the Greek women's national team's all-time second leading scorer.

== Notable Greek basketball coaches ==
- Men, in alphabetical order:

=== Vangelis Alexandris ===
- FIBA Saporta Cup Champion (1): 2000–01
- FIBA EuroCup Challenge Champion (1): 2002–03

=== Georgios Bartzokas ===
- EuroLeague Champion (1): 2012–13
- FIBA Club World Cup Champion (1): 2013
- EuroLeague Final Four Appearance (2×): 2013, 2016

=== Panagiotis Giannakis ===
- EuroBasket Gold: 2005
- FIBA World Cup Silver: 2006
- EuroLeague Runner-Up: 2009–10
- EuroLeague Final Four Appearances (2×): 2009, 2010

=== Giannis Ioannidis ===
- Greek League Champion (12×, record holder): 1978–79, 1982–83, 1984–85, 1985–86, 1986–87, 1987–88, 1988–89, 1989–90, 1992–93, 1993–94, 1994–95, 1995–96
- Greek Cup Winner (6×): 1984–85, 1986–87, 1987–88, 1988–89, 1989–90, 1993–94
- EuroLeague Runner-Up (3×): 1993–94, 1994–95, 1997–98
- EuroLeague Final Four Appearance (6×): 1988, 1989, 1990, 1994, 1995, 1998

=== Dimitris Itoudis ===
- VTB United League Champion (5×): 2014–15, 2015–16, 2016–17, 2017–18, 2018–19
- EuroLeague Champion (2×): 2015–16, 2018–19
- EuroLeague Final Four Appearance (5×): 2015, 2016, 2017, 2018, 2019

=== Efthimis Kioumourtzoglou ===
- EuroBasket Silver: 1989
- EuroLeague Final Four Appearance (1): 1995

=== Soulis Markopoulos ===
- FIBA Korać Cup Champion (1): 1993–94

=== Faidon Matthaiou ===
- FIBA European Selection (2×): 1970, 1973
- Greek League Champion (1): 1975–76
- Greek Cup Winner (2×): 1975–76, 1983–84

=== Nikos Milas ===
- Greek League Champion (3×): 1960–61, 1967–68, 1969–70
- FIBA European Cup Winners' Cup Champion (1): 1967–68

=== Kostas Politis ===
- EuroBasket Gold: 1987
- EuroLeague Final Four Appearances (1): 1994

=== Ioannis Sfairopoulos ===
- Greek League Champion (2×): 2014–15, 2015–16
- Israeli League Champion (2×): (2019, 2020)
- EuroLeague Runner-Up (2×): 2014–15, 2016–17
- EuroLeague Final Four Appearances (2×): 2015, 2017

== Notable foreign basketball players in Greece ==
With the financial rise of the professional men's club basketball competition, the Greek Basket League, during the 1990s, and the media interest for the league in Greece that was generated by large television viewership – there came a desire among viewers and fans to see Greek clubs bring in professional basketball players from abroad. Due to the Alpha 1 League's (its name at the time) immigration provisions, top foreign prospects chose the path of naturalization, in order to circumvent the league's rules. Among them were players from the former Yugoslavia, like Peja Stojaković and Marko Jarić, and from the ex-USSR, like Tiit Sokk. With the Bosman ruling in Europe in 1995, the Greek sports market was finally opened to foreign players, and as a result, today major players from around the world are active in the Basket League. The most notable foreign player that has played in the Greek League, is probably the American player Dominique Wilkins, who scored more than 26,000 points in the NBA, and is a member of the Naismith Memorial Basketball Hall of Fame. He left the Boston Celtics in 1995, and signed with Panathinaikos. Another well-known American player that moved to the Greek League, was the three-time NBA champion with the Los Angeles Lakers, Byron Scott, who later became a head coach in the NBA. A super talent who moved to Greece from the NBA was Roy Tarpley. In 1986, Tarpley was selected by the Dallas Mavericks, in the first round, with the seventh (7th) overall pick of the 1986 NBA draft. Tarpley made the NBA All-Rookie Team in his first season, and won the NBA Sixth Man of the Year Award the following year, when he averaged 13.5 points and 11.8 rebounds per game. In 1991, he was banned from the league for violating the NBA's drug-use policies, and in the 1992–93 season, he decided to come to the Greek League, first for Sato Aris, and then for Olympiacos. Some of the other prominent American players that moved to the Greek League, were Ken Barlow, Walter Berry, Rolando Blackman, P. J. Brown, Antonio Davis, Tony Delk, Eddie Johnson, Jeff Malone, Audie Norris, Mahmoud Abdul-Rauf, David Rivers, the four-time NBA champion John Salley, the two-time NBA champion Cliff Levingston, the future NBA head coach Scott Skiles, and Mitchell Wiggins.

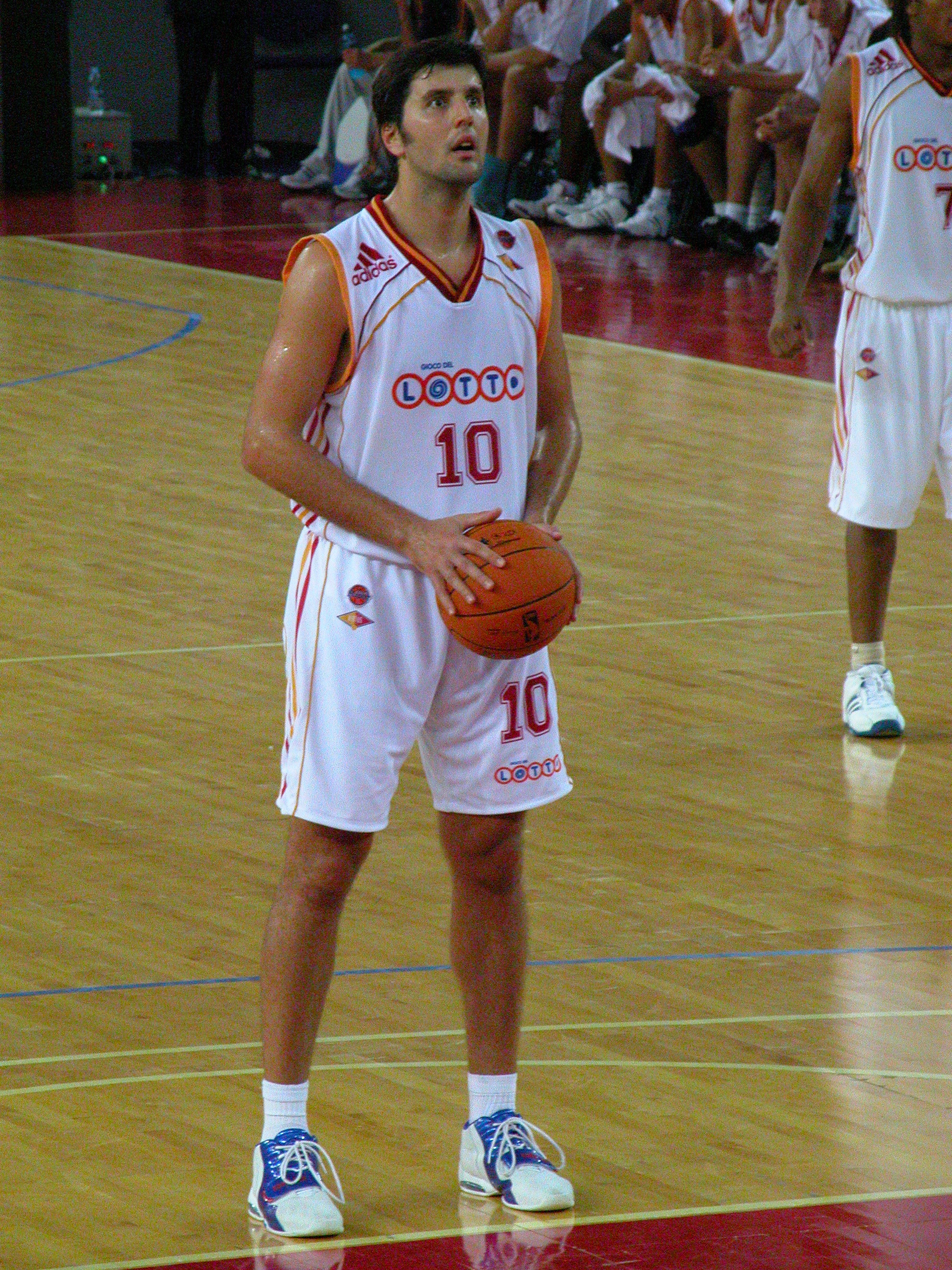
Dejan Bodiroga

Three of the most significant foreign European players in the history of the Basket League, are the Serbian player Dejan Bodiroga, the Croatian player Dino Rađja, and the Lithuanian player Šarūnas Jasikevičius. All three were named among the 50 Greatest EuroLeague Contributors in 2008, and Bodiroga and Jasikevičius were also named to the EuroLeague 2001–10 All-Decade Team. Bodiroga, a two-time FIBA World Cup champion, and a three-time EuroBasket champion, played for four years with Panathinaikos, and with them he won the EuroLeague championship twice. Despite the fact that he never played in the NBA, he was widely regarded as one of the world's best players at that time. Following a successful NBA career, Rađja moved to the Greek League, and he later became one of the few players to star for both of the arch-rivals Panathinaikos and Olympiacos. Jasikevičius, who is widely considered one of the best European players of all time, also moved from the NBA to the Greek League. Another well-known foreign European player to play in the Greek League was the Serbian player Dejan Tomašević.

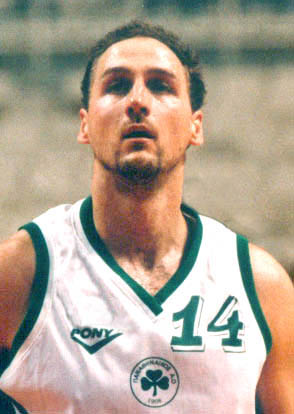
Dino Rađja

Other well-known foreign European players that have played in the Greek League include: the Serbs Boban Janković, Žarko Paspalj, Željko Rebrača, Zoran Savić, the Croats Arijan Komazec, Stojko Vranković, Zdravko Radulović, Damir Mulaomerović, and Nikola Vujčić, the Slovenes Rasho Nesterović and Jure Zdovc. As well as the Lithuanians Artūras Karnišovas, Ramūnas Šiškauskas, and Linas Kleiza. As well as the Frenchman Jim Bilba, the Ukrainian Sasha Volkov, and the Montenegrin Nikola Peković.

There have also been some other notable foreign players that have played in the Greek League. Some of them include players like: the Puerto Rican player José "Piculín" Ortiz, the Israeli Oded Kattash, the German Michael Koch, the Turkish player İbrahim Kutluay, and the Australians Andrew Gaze and Shane Heal. In recent years, key American players like Byron Dinkins, Maurice Evans, Alphonso Ford, Lawrence Funderburke, J.R. Holden, Roger Mason, Jeremiah Massey, Von Wafer, Josh Childress, and Acie Law have also played in the Greek League.

== Notable foreign basketball coaches in Greece ==
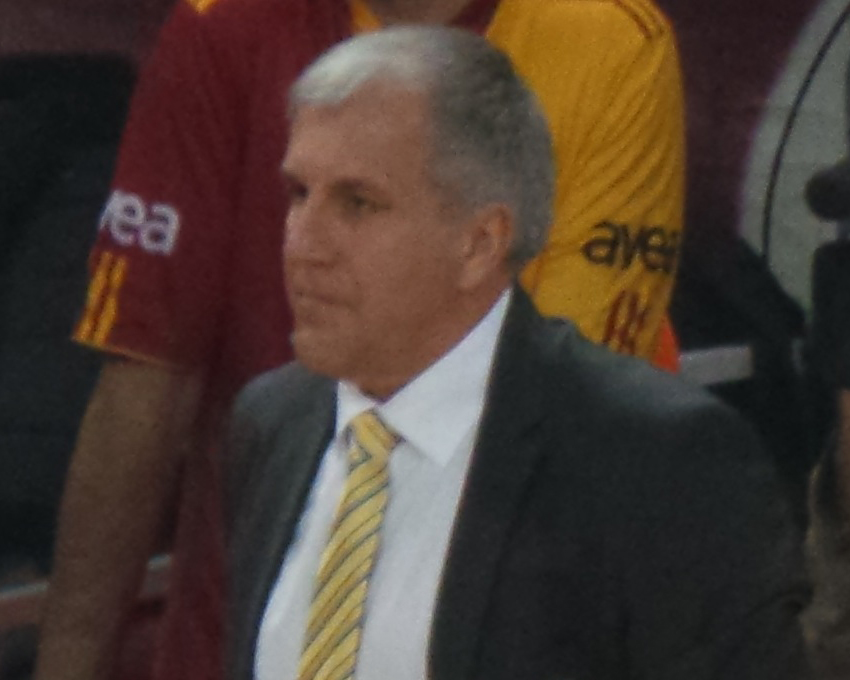
Željko Obradović

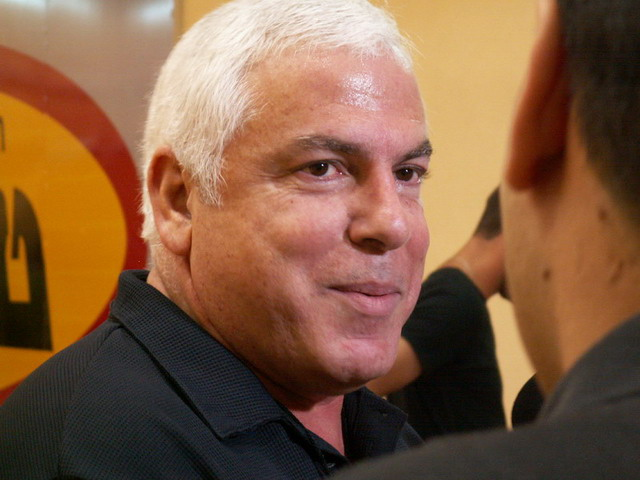
Pini Gershon

Many foreign coaches have been active in the Greek League. The most important one among them is the Serbian coach Željko Obradović, who was the head coach at Panathinaikos, from 1999 until 2012. Since starting his coaching career in 1991, Obradović has won nine EuroLeague championships, five of them with Panathinaikos, making him the most successful head coach in European men's pro club basketball history. Another foreign coach who has worked in the Greek League is Boža Maljković, who won 4 EuroLeague championships in his coaching career. In 1996, he led Panathinaikos to their first EuroLeague championship, which was also the first ever for a Greek club.

Another foreign head coach who worked in the Greek League was the multiple FIBA World Cup, and EuroBasket champion Duda Ivković. Ivković coached five teams in Greece (Aris, PAOK, Panionios, Olympiacos, and AEK), and he twice led Olympiacos to the EuroLeague championship. The three-time European-winning head coach (2× EuroLeague and the FIBA SuproLeague), the Israeli Pini Gershon, also coached in the Greek League. Obradović, Maljković, Ivković, and Gershon were honored in 2008, when they were named four of the 50 Greatest EuroLeague Contributors. Some other important foreign coaches that have coached in the Greek League, are the American NBA head coach Scott Skiles, the legendary Krešimir Ćosić, Vlade Đurović, "the two Cups" Željko Pavličević, Zvi Sherf, Dragan Šakota, Petar Skansi, Jonas Kazlauskas, Duško Ivanović, Sasha Djordjević, Xavi Pascual, Jure Zdovc, and David Blatt.

== Greek players abroad ==
Historically, the best Greek players generally did not play abroad because of the financial strength of Basket League, enabling its clubs to keep the country's top players at home. Until the late 1990s, virtually all of the Greece emn's national basketball team members played their club basketball in Greece. This situation began to change in the early 2000s, when the top leagues in Russia and Spain experienced huge financial growth, and a few top players chose to chase the even greater financial rewards and competitive challenge of the NBA.

This can be illustrated by the makeup of Greece's two EuroBasket-winning teams. All 12 players on the 1987 EuroBasket roster were under contract to Greek clubs, while five members of the 2005 EuroBasket squad were playing outside Greece. More recently, this phenomenon has begun to change as many Greek clubs, most notably long-time rivals Panathinaikos and Olympiacos, have offered top-notch salaries, to once again attract Greece's top players back home. Today, relatively few Greeks play in foreign leagues, and generally, they are usually not the country's best players. The final 12-man Greek squad for the 2010 FIBA World Championship included only three players who were under contract with a club in another country. Only one of the three, Nikos Zisis, had played outside the country for more than one season, going into the 2010 World Championship (he was preparing to start his second season with Montepaschi Siena of the Italian League). At the same time, Georgios Printezis was entering his second season at Unicaja of the Spanish League, and Sofoklis Schortsanitis had just left Olympiacos for Maccabi Tel Aviv of the Israeli League.

In addition to the players already named above, some of the other Greek players who have played for significant periods outside the country include:

- Faidon Matthaiou (1955–56)
- Kostas Patavoukas (1996–97)
- Georgios Kalaitzis (1997)
- Georgios Sigalas (1997–98)
- Tzanis Stavrakopoulos (1997–98)
- Kostas Tsartsaris (1997–98)
- Nikos Oikonomou (1999–00)
- Jake Tsakalidis (2000–07)
- Antonis Fotsis (2001–02, 2003–08, 2011–13)
- Panagiotis Liadelis (2002, 2003, 2006–09)
- Theo Papaloukas (2002–08, 2011–13)
- Michalis Kakiouzis (2002–09, 2010–13)
- Dimos Dikoudis (2003–06, 2008)
- Sofoklis Schortsanitis (2003–04, 2010–12, 2013–15)
- Pat Calathes (2004–08, 2012–2016, 2017)
- Nestoras Kommatos (2004–06, 2007–08, 2009, 2011, 2012)
- Lazaros Papadopoulos (2004–09, 2011, 2014)
- Andreas Glyniadakis (2005–07, 2012–15)
- Nikos Zisis (2005–20)
- Vassilis Spanoulis (2006–07)
- Kostas Vasileiadis (2006–07, 2009–15, 2016, 2017–20)
- Ioannis Bourousis (2006, 2011–16, 2017–20)
- Georgios Printezis (2009–11)
- Michael Bramos (2010–12, 2015–present)
- Manolis Papamakarios (2011–13, 2014)
- Kostas Kaimakoglou (2012–present)
- Nick Calathes (2012–15, 2020–present)
- Kostas Papanikolaou (2013–16)
- Kostas Sloukas (2015–20)

Among the favorite foreign leagues for Greek players are Russia's Russian Professional Championship (in its various forms over the years – Russian Superleague A, Russian PBL, and VTB United League), the Liga ACB in Spain, and the Lega Basket Serie A in Italy.

== Players from the Greek diaspora ==
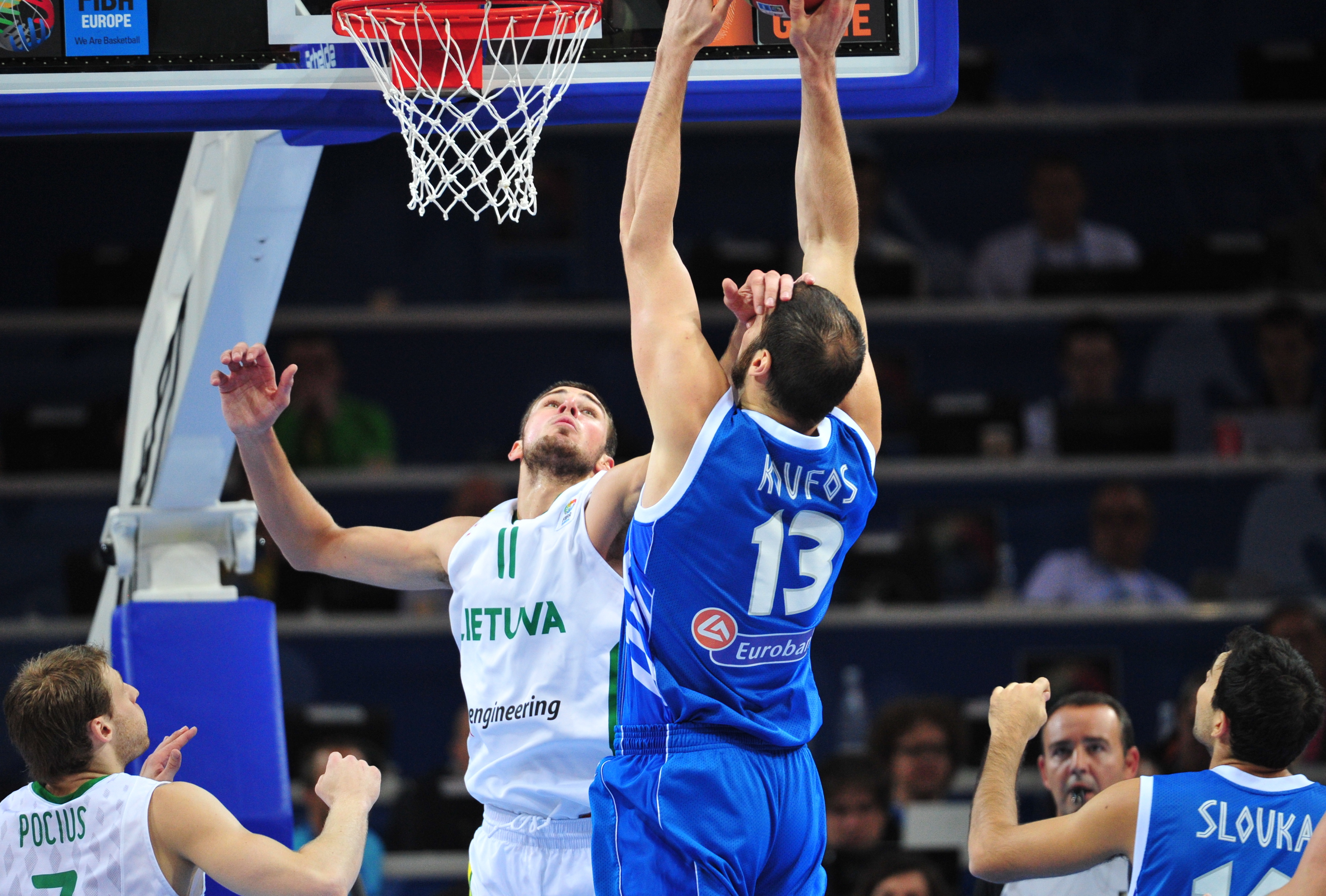
Kosta Koufos (#13 in blue), with the senior Greek NT.

The Greek diaspora has produced a number of prominent players who chose to start or establish their careers in Greece.

Perhaps the country's most celebrated player, Nikos Galis, is the son of Greek emigrants. He was born and raised in New Jersey. More recently, Pat and Nick Calathes, born and raised in Florida, who are descended from their Greek grandfather, chose to start their professional careers in Greece. The older Pat began his career at Maroussi, went from there to Kolossos Rodou, and then joined Panathinaikos, where Nick had played since beginning his professional career. Both remained at PAO through the 2011–12 season, after which they left Greece to continue their careers elsewhere in Europe (Pat in Israel and Nick in Russia). Pat then played in Panathinaikos again, while Nick has also returned to Panathianikos, after a two-year stint in the NBA. Michael Bramos is another American born player from the Greek diaspora, that chose to begin his pro career in Greece with Peristeri.

Lazaros Papadopoulos and Jake Tsakalidis were born to diaspora Greeks in the former Soviet Union, in modern-day Russia and Georgia respectively, but moved to Greece with their families at young ages, and they were developed in Greece. Both began their professional careers in Greece, but had extensive tenures outside the country, before eventually returning. Papadopoulos established himself as a star with Panathinaikos, but spent many of his best years in Russia, Spain, and Italy, while Tsakilidis spent seven years in the NBA, after starting with AEK. Sergei Bazarevich, was also born and raised in the Soviet Union, and also had Greek lineage. He played in both Greece and the NBA.

Former Greek NBA player, Kosta Koufos, is also from the Greek diaspora, but he has never played with a Greek pro club. Like Galis, he is the son of Greek emigrants, and was born and raised in the U.S. (in his case, Ohio), but he went directly from Ohio State University, to the NBA, without a stopover in Greece. However, Koufos chose to represent the Greece men's national basketball team internationally, as did the Calathes brothers and Bramos. Recently, the Greek diaspora produced players like: Tyler Dorsey, Naz Mitrou-Long, and Zach Auguste, whom have chosen to represent Greece internationally.

== Greek NBA players ==
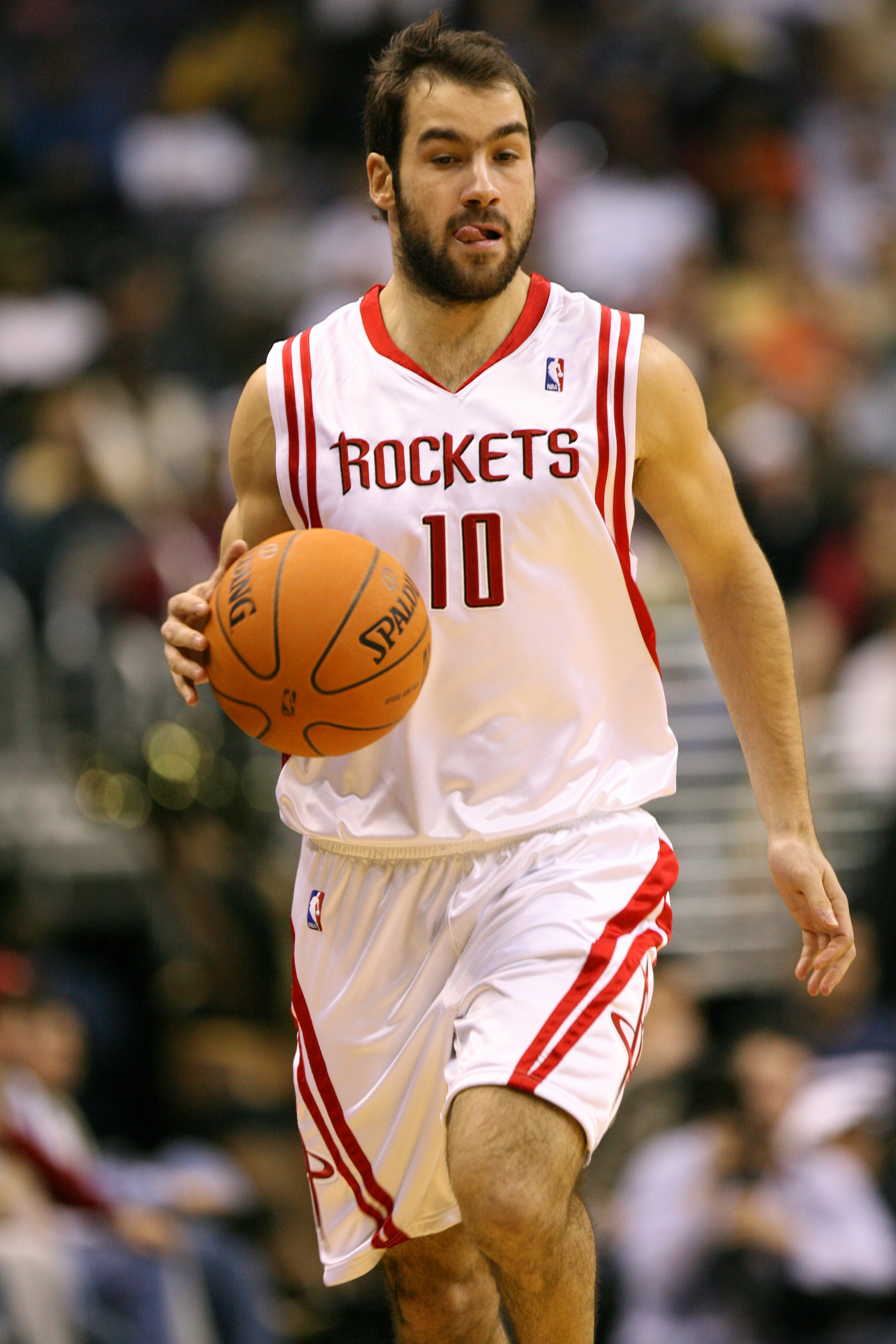
Vassilis Spanoulis with the Houston Rockets.

The first Greek-born basketball player that made the leap to the NBA was Antonis Fotsis. Fotsis was selected in the 2001 NBA draft, by the Memphis Grizzlies, and he played with them in the NBA for one season. After one season in the NBA, Fotsis returned to Greece, reportedly due to homesickness. Efthimios Rentzias and Andreas Glyniadakis also played in the NBA for one season, before returning to play in Europe.

Vassilis Spanoulis, who was regarded to be the top Greek basketball talent, and the main Greek-born NBA prospect, moved to the NBA in 2006, to play with the Houston Rockets, but he returned to Greece after a disappointing season, both for himself and the Rockets. This was mainly due both to some personal disagreements that he had with then Rockets head coach Jeff Van Gundy, and because of personal family problems.

Giannis Antetokounmpo is a Greek professional basketball player of Nigerian descent, who currently plays for the Milwaukee Bucks of the National Basketball Association (NBA). His nickname is "The Greek Freak". His older brother, Thanasis, has also played in the NBA games with the New York Knicks and the Bucks. Another one of the Antetokounmpo brothers, Kostas, has also played in the NBA.

Jake Tsakalidis, who was born in Georgia, and raised and developed basketball-wise in Greece, played in the NBA from 2000 to 2007, after beginning his career in Greece. Sergei Bazarevich, born and raised in the Soviet Union, and of Greek descent. Some other NBA players with Greek citizenship include: Peja Stojaković, Rasho Nesterović, Marko Jarić, and Dragan Tarlać, whom all moved to Greece at a young age, the Greek-American players Kurt Rambis, Kosta Koufos, Nick Calathes, and Tyler Dorsey, as well as the Greek-Canadian player Naz Mitrou-Long. The Lebanese-born Rony Seikaly, who played in the NBA from 1988 to 1999, and also played with the senior men's USA national team, was also raised and developed basketball-wise in Greece.

The Greek players Kostas Papanikolaou and Georgios Papagiannis, have also played in the NBA.

=== Greek WNBA players ===
Anastasia Kostaki and Evanthia Maltsi are female Greek professional basketball players that have played in the WNBA.

== Players with the most men's Greek League championships won ==
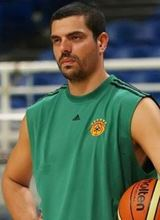
Kostas Tsartsaris won 10 Greek League championships.

This is a list of the basketball players that have won the most championships over the years in the men's 1st-tier level Greek League.

- Players listed in **bold** are still active.

Ranking	Player	Championships Won
1.	(Greece) Dimitris Kokolakis	12
2.	(Greece) Fragiskos Alvertis	11
–	(Greece) Takis Koroneos	11
4	(Greece) Antonis Fotsis	10
4.	(Greece) Kostas Tsartsaris	10
6.	(Greece) Nikos Filippou	9
–	(Greece) Apostolos Kontos	9
–	(United States) Mike Batiste	9
–	(Greece) Dimitris Diamantidis	9
10.	(Greece) Nikos Galis	8
–	(Greece) Georgios Kalaitzis	8
–	(Greece) Michalis Romanidis	8
–	(Greece) Georgios Doxakis	8
–	(Greece) Antonis Christeas	8
15.	(Greece) Vassilis Spanoulis	7
15.	(Greece) Panagiotis Giannakis	7

== Basketball in the Greek media ==
On a daily basis, 16 newspapers in the country of Greece publish what is happening in the sport of basketball. Although the media's main focus is always on the men's professional club Greek League, they will also report on the lower level divisions, like the men's A2 League, as well as the NBA, and the other major European national domestic leagues, like the Spanish ACB League and big international club competitions like the EuroLeague.

Greek television has the ability to broadcast all of the men's Greek League games. The men's professional club Greek League has the TV rights to distribute itself on the Greek public broadcaster ERT, the private channel ANT1, and the pay TV station Novasport. EuroLeague games are also broadcast on Novasport, and the private channel Skai TV. Live broadcasts of the Greek League men's national championship, and European-wide professional club games are also offered by the country's large number of sports radio stations.

== See also ==
- Greek Basket League
- Greek A2 Basket League
- Men's Greek National Basketball Cup
- Men's Greek Basketball Super Cup
- Greece men's national basketball team
- Greece women's national basketball team
- Acropolis International Basketball Tournament
- FIBA European Champions Cup and EuroLeague history
