= Abrlić =

Abrlić is a surname. Notable people with the surname include:

- Lidija Abrlić (born 1969), Croatian basketball player
- Tihana Abrlić (born 1976), Croatian basketball player
