= Sailing at the 2001 Mediterranean Games =

- Venue: Tunis

The sailing events at the 2001 Mediterranean Games took place in Tunis, Tunisia. Athletes competed in three men's and three women's events.

== Medal summary ==
=== Men's events ===
| Event | Gold | Silver | Bronze |
|---|---|---|---|
| Mistral | Julien Bontemps (FRA) | Iván Pastor (ESP) | Alexandre Guyader (FRA) |
| Laser | Diego Negri (ITA) | Mate Arapov (CRO) | Vasilij Žbogar (SLO) |
| 470 Men's | Italy (ITA); Gabrio Zandonà; Andrea Trani | Turkey (TUR); Selim Kakış; Hasan Kaan Özgönenç | France (FRA); Nicolas Charbonnier; Stéphane Christidis |

=== Women's events ===
| Event | Gold | Silver | Bronze |
|---|---|---|---|
| Mistral | Alessandra Sensini (ITA) | Lise Vidal (FRA) | Eugenie Raffin (FRA) |
| Laser | Larissa Nevierov (ITA) | Sophie De Turckheim (FRA) | Alicia Cebrián (ESP) |
| 470 Women's | France (FRA); Ingrid Petitjean; Nadège Douroux | France (FRA); Anne Claire Le Berre; Marie Riou | Greece (GRE); Dimitra Mylona; Aliki Kourkoulou |

=== Medal table ===
| Rank | Nation | Gold | Silver | Bronze | Total |
|---|---|---|---|---|---|
| 1 | Italy | 4 | 0 | 0 | 4 |
| 2 | France | 2 | 3 | 3 | 8 |
| 3 | Spain | 0 | 1 | 1 | 2 |
| 4 | Croatia | 0 | 1 | 0 | 1 |
| 4 | Turkey | 0 | 1 | 0 | 1 |
| 6 | Greece | 0 | 0 | 1 | 1 |
| 6 | Slovenia | 0 | 0 | 1 | 1 |
| Totals (7 entries) | | 6 | 6 | 6 | 18 |
