= Alekos Spanoudakis =

Greek basketball player (1928–2019)

Personal information
- Born: 8 July 1928 Chania, Crete, Greece
- Died: 10 March 2019 (aged 90)

Career information
- Playing career: 1947–1964
- Position: Shooting guard

Career history
- 1947–1964: Olympiacos

Career highlights
- 2× Greek League champion (1949, 1960)
Medals
Men's Basketball
Representing Greece
EuroBasket
| Bronze medal – third place | 1949 Egypt |
Mediterranean Games
| Bronze medal – third place | 1955 Spain |

Alexandros Spanoudakis (Greek: Αλέξανδρος "Αλέκος" Σπανουδάκης; 8 July 1928 – 10 March 2019) was a Greek basketball player. He represented the Greece men's national basketball team. Along with his brother, Ioannis, he is considered to be one of the early leading pioneers of the sport of modern basketball in the country of Greece. While a member of the Greek Basket League club Olympiacos, he became the first Greek basketball player to shoot jump shots in the modern style and technique, in the 1950s.

== Club career ==
Spanoudakis played basketball at the club level with the Greek Basket League team Olympiacos. While with Olympiacos in the 1950s, Spanoudakis trained with Bob Cousy and Greek-American Lou Tsioropoulos, of the NBA's Boston Celtics, in Greece. Spanoudakis, and his brother, Ioannis, learned the American style of basketball from the two Celtics players, and they were the first two athletes to bring American basketball techniques to Greece.

== National team career ==
Spanoudakis was a member of the Greece men's national basketball team. With Greece, they won the bronze medal at the 1949 EuroBasket. He played at the 1951 EuroBasket, and at the 1952 Summer Olympic Games.
