= Nikolina Grabovac =

Croatian and Yugoslav basketball player

Personal information
- Born: June 3, 1968 (age 58) Zenica, SFR Yugoslavia
- Listed height: 1.73 m (5 ft 8 in)

Career information
- Playing career: –2009
- Position: Shooting guard

Career history
- Livno
- 2005–2009: Studenac Omiš

Nikolina Grabovac (born 3 June 1968 in Zenica, SFR Yugoslavia) is a former Croatian and Yugoslav female professional basketball player.

== Sources ==
- Profile at eurobasket.com
- Profile at fiba.com
