= Marianna Balleggi =

Italian basketball player (born 1974)

Marianna Balleggi (born 6 November 1974) is an Italian former basketball player.
