= Ioannis Spanoudakis =

Greek basketball player

Ioannis Spanoudakis Ιωάννης Σπανουδάκης
Personal information
- Born: 1 January 1930 Chania, Crete, Greece
- Died: 10 June 2010 (aged 79) Athens, Greece

Career information
- Playing career: 1947–1967
- Coaching career: 1947–1966

Career history

Playing
- 1947–64: Olympiacos Piraeus
- Virtus Bologna
- Motomorini Bologna

Coaching
- 1947–65: Olympiacos Piraeus
- 1967-70: Peiraikos Syndesmos

Career highlights
- As a player: 2× Greek League champion (1949, 1960); As a head coach: 2× Greek League champion (1949, 1960)
Medals
Men's Basketball
Representing Greece
Mediterranean Games
Bronze medal – third place	1955 Spain

Ioannis Spanoudakis (alternate spellings: Giannis, Yiannis, Yannis) (Greek: Ιωάννης "Γιάννης" Σπανουδάκης) (1930 – 10 June 2010), was a Greek basketball player and coach. He represented the Greece men's national basketball team. Along with his brother, Alekos, he is considered to be one of the early leading pioneers of the sport of modern basketball in the country of Greece. He was the long-time player / head coach of the Greek Basket League club Olympiacos, acting simultaneously in both roles, while with the club.

== Club career ==
Spanoudakis played basketball at the club level with the Greek Basket League team Olympiacos. While with Olympiacos in the 1950s, Spanoudakis trained with Bob Cousy and Greek-American Lou Tsioropoulos, of the NBA's Boston Celtics, in Greece. Spanoudakis, and his brother, Alekos, learned the American style of basketball from the two Celtics players, and they were the first two athletes to bring American basketball techniques to Greece.

He also played in the Italian LBA League, with Virtus Bologna and Motomorini Bologna.

== National team career ==
Spanoudakis was a member of the Greek men's national basketball team. With Greece, he played at the 1951 EuroBasket, and at the 1952 Summer Olympic Games. He also played at the 1960 Pre-Olympic Tournament.

== Coaching career ==
Spanoudakis was the head coach of the Greek Basket League club Olympiacos.
