= Lidija Abrlić =

Yugoslav and Croatian basketball player

Personal information
- Born: September 13, 1969 (age 57) Senj, SFR Yugoslavia

Career history
- Dubrava Zagreb
- Montmontaža Zagreb
- Croatia Zagreb
Medals
Women's basketball
Representing Croatia
Mediterranean Games
Gold medal – first place	1997 Bari	Team

Lidija Abrlić, married Gnjidić (born September 13, 1969 in Senj, SFR Yugoslavia) is a former Yugoslavian and Croatian basketball player.
