= Božena Erceg =

Croatian basketball player

Personal information
- Born: 31 December 1981 (age 44) Knin, SR Croatia, SFR Yugoslavia
- Listed height: 1.82 m (6 ft 0 in)

Career information
- WNBA draft: 2003: undrafted
- Playing career: –2009

Career history
- 2005–2006: Basket Club Bolzano
- UB-Barça
- Jolly JBS
- Hapoel Tel Aviv
- CDB Zaragoza
- 2008–2009: AE Sedis Bàsquet
Medals
Women's basketball
Representing Croatia
Mediterranean Games
Gold medal – first place	2001 Tunis	Team
Silver medal – second place	2005 Almería	Team

Božena Blaće (née Erceg; born 31 December 1981) is a Croatian female basketball player.

== Sources ==
- Profile at eurobasket.com
