= Jelena Zrnić =

Croatian basketball player

Personal information
- Born: December 22, 1975 (age 50) Bjelovar, SFR Yugoslavia
- Listed height: 1.99 m (6 ft 6 in)
- Listed weight: 96 kg (212 lb)
- Position: Center

Career history
- 1998-2000: Femenino Tres Cantos
- 2000-2001: CB Navarra
- 2001-2003: CB Puig d'en Valls
- 2003-2004: CB Arxil
- 2004-2005: Nacex Jovent
- 2005-2007: Ses Salines

Jelena Zrnić (born December 22, 1975) is a former Croatian female professional basketball player.
