= Marina Mazić =

Croatian basketball player

Personal information
- Born: September 25, 1980 (age 46) Zagreb, SFR Yugoslavia
- Listed height: 1.90 m (6 ft 3 in)

Career information
- WNBA draft: 2002: undrafted
- Playing career: –2011
- Position: Center

Career history
- Croatia Zagreb
- Esperides
- Jolly JBS
- Umana Reyer Venecia
- COB Calais
- Gospić
- Ikaros
- Ibiza
- 2010–2011: Novi Zagreb
Medals
Women's basketball
Representing Croatia
Mediterranean Games
Gold medal – first place	2001 Tunis	Team
Silver medal – second place	2005 Almería	Team

Marina Mazić (born 25 September 1980 in Zagreb, SFR Yugoslavia) is a former Croatian female basketball player.

== Career ==
She played for ŽKK Croatia Zagreb, with whom she won three Croatian championship titles. She played for ŽKK Gospić . In Croatia and Gospić, she won a total of five Croatian Cups and one Greek Cup in the Greek Esperides from Glyfada. She also played for the Spanish Ibiza, the French COB Calais and the Italian Umani Reyer from Venice.

In 1998, she was named the best player in Croatia.

In 2008, she was in the group of players invited by coach Nenad Amanović to prepare for the 2009 European Championship.

In 2011, she ended her career due to a long-standing back injury.
