= ŽKK Dubrava Zagreb =

- Leagues: Croatian League
- Founded: 1979
- History: Dubrava Zagreb (1979-2018)
- Arena: ŠD Dubrava (capacity: 1.800)
- Location: Zagreb, Croatia
- Team colors: Black and Yellow
- President: (Croatia)
- Head coach: (Croatia) Zoran Jokić (1979-2018)
- Website: http://zkkdubrava.hr/ (nonexistent)

ŽKK Dubrava Zagreb is a Croatian Women's basketball club in Zagreb. The headquarters is in Zagreb.
