= Mirjana Tabak =

Croatian basketball player

Personal information
- Born: 14 October 1972 (age 54) Tomislavgrad, SFR Yugoslavia
- Listed height: 1.82 m (6 ft 0 in)
- Position: Power forward / small forward

Career history
- 2005-2008: Gospić

Mirjana Tabak (born 14 October 1972 in Tomislavgrad; died 12 August 2025 in Split) was a Croatian former female professional basketball player.
