= Monika Kovač =

Croatian basketball player

Personal information
- Born: 21 March 1974 (age 52) Berlin, East Germany
- Listed height: 1.66 m (5 ft 5 in)

Career information
- Playing career: –2009
- Position: Point guard

Career history
- Livno
- Elitzur Holon
- 2007–2009: Croatia 2006 Zagreb
Medals
Women's basketball
Representing Croatia
Mediterranean Games
| Gold medal – first place | 1997 Bari | Team |

Monika Kovač (born 21 March 1974) is a former Croatian female basketball player.
