= Sonja Kireta =

Croatian basketball player

Personal information
- Born: 21 October 1976 (age 50) Zagreb, SFR Yugoslavia
- Listed height: 1.98 m (6 ft 6 in)

Career information
- WNBA draft: 1998: undrafted
- Playing career: 1993–2015
- Position: Center

Career history
- 1993–1999: Hrvatski Dragovoljac
- 1999–2001: Montmontaža Zagreb
- 2001–2002: Botaş SK
- 2003–2004: Celta de Vigo Baloncesto
- 2004: Pays d'Aix Basket 13
- 2004–2005: Ros Casares Valencia
- 2005–2006: Valenciennes
- 2006–2008: CJM Bourges Basket
- 2008–2010: USK Praha
- 2011: Nantes Rezé Basket
- 2011: CB Avenida
- 2011–2013: Basket Parma
- 2013–2014: Tarsus Belediye
- 2015: Lavezzini Parma
Medals
Women's basketball
Representing Croatia
Mediterranean Games
Gold medal – first place	1997 Bari	Team

Sonja Kireta (born 21 October 1976 in Zagreb, SFR Yugoslavia) is a former Croatian female basketball player.
