= Katarina Maloča =

Croatian basketball player

Personal information
- Born: 28 October 1975 (age 51) Zagreb, SFR Yugoslavia
- Listed height: 1.91 m (6 ft 3 in)

Career information
- WNBA draft: 1997: undrafted
- Playing career: –2014
- Position: Power forward / center

Career history
- Dubrava Zagreb
- 1995–1996: Jabuka
- 1996–1998: Croatia Zagreb
- 1998–2000: Besiktas
- 2000–2001: Libertas Trogylos Basket
- 2002–2003: Adana Botaş
- Mersin S.K.
- 2005–2006: Gospić
- 2006–2007: Pays d'Aix Basket 13
- 2007–2008: Gospić
- 2008–2009: AE Sedis Bàsquet
- Pleter
- Dunav Ruse
- 2011–2013: Kvarner
- 2014: Osmaniye Genclik
Medals
Women's basketball
Representing Croatia
Mediterranean Games
Gold medal – first place	1997 Bari	Team
Gold medal – first place	2001 Tunis	Team
Silver medal – second place	2005 Almería	Team

Katarina Maloča, married Mrčela (born 28 October 1975 in Zagreb, SFR Yugoslavia) is a former Croatian female professional basketball player.
