= Jasenka Marohnić =

Croatian basketball player

Personal information
- Born: 19 November 1972 (age 53) Zagreb, SFR Yugoslavia
- Listed height: 1.86 m (6 ft 1 in)

Career information
- Playing career: –2005
- Position: Center

Career history
- 1992–1998: Montmontaža Zagreb
- 1998–2000: Hrvatski Dragovoljac
- 2000–2001: Croatia Zagreb
- 2001–2002: Achilleas
- 2003–2004: Croatia Zagreb
- 2004–2005: Medveščak
Medals
Women's basketball
Representing Croatia
Mediterranean Games
Gold medal – first place	2001 Tunis	Team
Silver medal – second place	2005 Almería	Team

Jasenka Marohnić (born 19 November 1972 in Zagreb, SFR Yugoslavia) is a former Croatian female basketball player during the 1989 season of the European Championships.
