= Amra Đapo =

Croatian basketball player

Personal information
- Born: 30 December 1976 (age 49) Sarajevo, SFR Yugoslavia
- Listed height: 1.84 m (6 ft 0 in)

Career information
- WNBA draft: 1998: undrafted
- Position: Shooting guard / small forward

Career history
- CB Avenida
- Real Canoe Natación Club
- Pecs 2010
- 2007–2008: Badajoz
- 2008–2011: Txingudi Saski Baloi Elkartea
- 2011–2012: Unión Navarra Basket
- 2012–2014: Play Off Sarajevo
- 2015–2016: AD Cortegada
Medals
Women's basketball
Representing Croatia
Mediterranean Games
Gold medal – first place	1997 Bari	Team

Amra Đapo (born 30 December 1976) is a former Croatian female professional basketball player.
