= Slavica Pretreger =

Croatian basketball player

Personal information
- Born: 8 April 1971 (age 55) Vukovar, SR Croatia, SFR Yugoslavia
- Listed height: 1.70 m (5 ft 7 in)

Career information
- Playing career: 19??–2005
- Position: Shooting guard

Career history
- 2004–2005: Gospić

Slavica Pretreger (born 8 April 1971) is a former Croatian female basketball player.
