= Božidar Maljković =

Serbian basketball coach (born 1952)

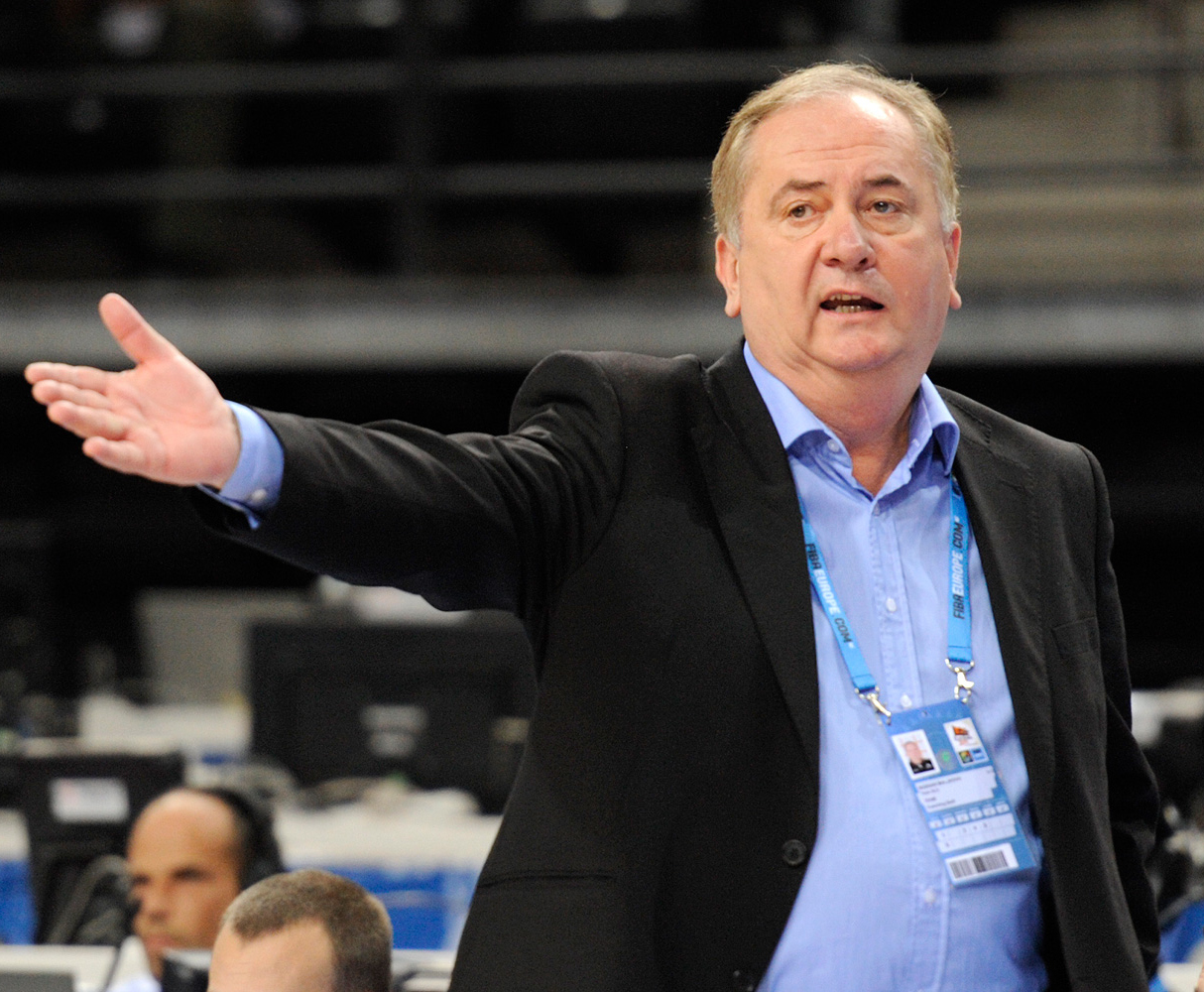
- Maljković coaching Slovenia during EuroBasket 2011.

President of the Olympic Committee of Serbia (OKS)
- In office 2017–2025
- Preceded by: Vlade Divac
- Succeeded by: Dejan Tomašević

Personal details
- Born: 20 April 1952 (age 74) Otočac, PR Croatia, FPR Yugoslavia
- Occupation: Basketball coach; sports administrator
- Basketball career
- Coaching career: 1971–2013

Career history

Coaching
- 1971–1977: Ušće Belgrade
- 1977–1979: Crvena zvezda (youth)
- 1979–1980: Radnički Belgrade (assistant)
- 1980–1982: Radnički Belgrade
- 1982: KK Lifam Stara Pazova
- 1983–1986: Crvena zvezda (assistant)
- 1986–1990: Jugoplastika
- 1990–1991: FC Barcelona
- 1992–1995: Limoges
- 1995–1997: Panathinaikos
- 1997–1998: PSG Racing
- 1998–2003: Unicaja
- 2004–2006: Real Madrid
- 2007: TAU Cerámica
- 2011–2012: Lokomotiv Kuban
- 2012: Cedevita

Career highlights
- As head coach: FIBA Intercontinental Cup champion (1996); 4× EuroLeague champion (1989, 1990, 1993, 1996); FIBA Korać Cup champion (2001); Spanish League champion (2005); Spanish Cup champion (1991); Greek Cup champion (1996); 3× Yugoslav League champion (1988–1990); Yugoslav Cup champion (1990); 2× French League champion (1993, 1994); 2× French Cup champion (1994, 1995); 2× French League Best Coach (1993, 1994); 50 Greatest EuroLeague Contributors (2008); Ivković Award for Lifetime Achievement (2005)

Božidar "Boža" Maljković (Serbian Cyrillic: Божидар "Божа" Маљковић; born 20 April 1952) is a Serbian former professional basketball coach.

He is one of the most successful basketball coaches in Europe, having won league titles with practically all the clubs he trained; including four EuroLeague titles with three clubs (Jugoplastika, Limoges, and Panathinaikos). In 2008, he was named one of the 50 Greatest EuroLeague Contributors.

He served as president of the Olympic Committee of Serbia from 2017 to 2025. His daughter Marina is a Serbian professional basketball coach, currently coaching Serbia women's national team.

== Early life ==
Born in Otočac within the region of Lika to Serb parents hailing from villages in the vicinity of nearby Brinje, eight-year-old Maljković's parents moved the family to Kraljevo due to his Yugoslav People's Army (JNA) officer father getting reassigned there.

Maljković was an avid cyclist in his youth; he took up basketball at the age of 12, playing the shooting guard position at KK Sloga. Assessing his own playing skills in an interview decades later, Maljković said: "I could shoot the ball fairly decently, but had no defensive skills. As a coach, I would never pick Maljković the player on any serious team".

A few years later, during the mid-1960s, the family moved to Belgrade, settling in an apartment within the newly built "Šest kaplara" housing development for the JNA officers' families, located in New Belgrade's Blok 21 adjacent to the Ušće neighbourhood. During his time in "Šest kaplara", teenage Maljković was neighbours with water polo players Mirko Sandić and Zoran Janković, prominent VK Partizan and Yugoslav national team members at the time.

== Coaching career ==
Having ended his playing career prematurely at only 19 years of age, Maljković immediately began coaching at Ušće, newly established basketball outfit from the eponymous Belgrade neighbourhood. Maljković is among the four people who founded the fledgling club in 1971 on the initiative of local communist authorities from the New Belgrade municipality. Reportedly, the catalyst to set up a new, community-based basketball activity was a gruesome crime in the Ušće neighbourhood that saw a local resident murder his own son; the shock throughout the community prompted the local authorities into establishing a basketball club in order to provide the neighbourhood youngsters with a creative outlet. The murder came on the heels of a general increase in criminality in the 12,000-resident Ušće local community that mostly consisted of recently arrived families of the Yugoslav People's Army officers and personnel from all over SFR Yugoslavia; this local spike in crime only sped up the process of establishing a basketball club as means of channeling the energy of the local youth into something positive.

Maljković, himself a young man, began coaching the club in 1971. In parallel to coaching basketball, Maljković enrolled at the University of Belgrade's Faculty of Law though he never graduated. Working in extremely modest circumstances without regular access to a gym and with mostly outdoor practices in Ušće park, the club still managed to gain multiple promotions and jump several ranks of competition.

In 1977, Maljković took a coaching offer from the Crvena zvezda youth system, becoming head coach of the club's junior team.

=== Radnički Belgrade ===
In 1979, noticing Maljković's dedication and enthusiasm both at Ušće and Red Star, established head coach Bata Đorđević invited the 27-year-old across town to be his assistant at Radnički Belgrade, another Belgrade club that much like KK Ušće started out as a community-based operation in the city neighbourhood of Crveni Krst. Seeing Radnički had been playing in the First Federal League (top tier on the Yugoslav basketball pyramid), Maljković jumped at the opportunity. The club was also only six years removed from its biggest success – 1973 national league title. In the years following their domestic title, they additionally put together memorable European campaigns, reaching the 1973–74 FIBA European Champions Cup semifinal as well as 1976–77 FIBA European Cup Winners' Cup final. Despite being in constant shadow of the city giants Crvena zvezda and Partizan, Radnički nevertheless managed to carve out a place for itself on the Yugoslav basketball map, establishing an identity of a scrappy small club regularly punching above its weight.

==== 1979–80 season: assistant to Bata Đorđević ====
In Maljković's first season at Radnički as Đorđević's assistant, the club finished with a 9–13 record, placing 10th in the 12-team league thus barely avoiding relegation. It also experienced major budgetary problems with its main financial backers, state-owned Fabrika odlivaka Beograd (FOB) iron foundry factory, cutting its sponsorship. At one point during the season Maljković, who had temporarily quit his law studies, said he did not receive a salary for five months.

==== 1980–81 season: first top-level head coaching experience ====
Continual financial struggles at the club affected it in various ways, including the departure of head coach Đorđević during summer 1980. Young Maljković became his replacement, admitting to getting the position "not because I was somehow the best fit to lead this particular team, but simply because nobody else wanted the job". Playing their home games at Hala sportova, 28-year-old Maljković's debut season as head coach in the First League brought no improvement for the club that finished with identical 9–13 record, good for 9th place this time. Maljković's Radnički, however, directly influenced the title race by beating Cibona late in the season (handing Cibona only its third loss that season) thus enabling their Hala co-tenants Partizan to take the championship by catching up to Cibona's 19–3 record and overtaking it at the top of the table due to better head-to-head record (this was before the playoff system was introduced in the league).

==== 1981–82 season ====
Maljković stayed for the 1981–82 season as well, leading Radnički one more time to its now customary 9–13 record. At the end of the season, the club saw another big exodus of its players and staff, including Maljković, due to more sponsors backing out.

Summing up his time with Radnički, in 2013 Maljković expressed "certain sadness all these years later due to feeling I could've done more with that team, something like what I managed with Jugoplastika later, but on a smaller scale, because we had a very talented group of young players along with some older ones".

=== Six months in Stara Pazova ===
After Radnički, during summer 1982 Maljković accepted the head coaching offer from KK Lifam, a club from Stara Pazova playing in the Yugoslav First B League, the country's second-tier competition.

He remained living in Belgrade and would drive out to Stara Pazova every morning for practices.

=== Ranko Žeravica's assistant at Crvena zvezda ===
With a bit of a coaching CV now behind him, Maljković was approached in early 1983 by Crvena zvezda about joining their coaching staff as assistant to legendary coach Ranko Žeravica in addition to an offer of simultaneously leading the club's youth system. He took the job largely due to Žeravica's clout and authority in Yugoslav basketball despite advice from some colleagues who felt that taking an assistant job after being a head coach in the First League was a step backward career-wise.

=== Jugoplastika ===
Maljković's big head coaching break would come at Jugoplastika, where he arrived in early summer 1986 on recommendation from Yugoslav basketball's universally revered elder statesman Aca Nikolić who, having just recently retired from active coaching, took on an advisory role with the Split club. The young assistant coach was not the club's first choice as they initially wanted Vlade Đurović, the hottest coaching commodity in Yugoslav basketball at the time having just led Zadar to the league championship. In demand Đurović, however, turned down the head coaching offer from Split, choosing the one from Crvena zvezda instead so after unsuccessfully courting a few more candidates Jugoplastika eventually turned to Maljković who gladly accepted.

The appointment of a young and unproven head coach was not without critics at Split, including some within the club such as 19-year-old center Dino Rađa who openly talked to the press about his displeasure with the hiring of Maljković who in the young player's opinion "lacked head coaching experience". And it wasn't just Rađa questioning Maljković's coaching credentials because the quiet consensus around Split at the time was that Jugoplastika is a potent squad loaded with young talent and as such needs an experienced coach to provide leadership, not someone still learning his craft.

Jugoplastika ended the just completed 1985–86 league season in 6th spot (outside of the top four required to make the playoffs) following a turbulent campaign that started with Slavko Trninić as head coach, before he got the sack due to poor results early on and got replaced with Zoran Slavnić. Freewheeling Slavnić initiated a squad overhaul by bringing younger players into the first team (including great 17-year-old prospect – small forward Toni Kukoč who was equally adept at playing any other position) and giving them greater freedom on the court. This resulted in Jugoplastika ending the season with a 12–10 record that tied it with Šibenka and Partizan, however due to worse head-to-head record against the two teams it ended in 6th spot and out of the playoffs, still good for a Korać Cup berth next season. Despite clear improvement since his arrival Slavnić still left at the end of the season.

==== 1986–87: building a future champion ====
My toughest game in my four years at Jugoplastika was without any doubt the very first time we faced Partizan. It was in Split versus their strong, powerful, and extremely talented side. I remember their club president Dragan Kićanović walking by my bench before the game, telling me provocatively: 'What's the matter, shitting your pants?' And I wasn't ashamed to admit to him that I was in fact very afraid. It was essential that we show we can play a team like that because we were still an unproven quantity. At halftime we had −6, and I remember going to the locker room paralyzed with fear, thinking: 'Maybe this is it for me and for this team. Maybe the more financially powerful clubs like Cibona (who were reigning Euro champs and in the middle of this great domestic winning run) will pillage half of my squad and lure Kukoč and Rađa away'. So, yes, that game was the toughest. In comparison, all the other ones, including the Euroleague final fours, were easy stuff.

— Boža Maljković

The young 34-year-old coach Maljković thus took over a young squad with Kukoč and Rađa as its biggest assets. Other prominent players on the team included the twenty-year-old shooting guard Velimir Perasović and twenty-two-year-old center Goran Sobin. Several older players such as Ivica Dukan left the club that summer. Maljković's only summer acquisition of note was the twenty-two-year-old point guard Zoran Sretenović from Crvena zvezda where he wasn't getting much of a chance to play as backup to established national team player Zoran Radović; Liking Sretenović's character qualities and believing in his basketball skills, Maljković decided to give him a chance by bringing him in to be the team's primary playmaker, envisioning his role at Jugoplastika as the main distributor on offense for Kukoč and Rađa. Maljković's decision to get Sretenović was second-guessed among the club's management who simply didn't know the player and were hoping for an established name.

Under the tutelage of sixty-two-year-old professor Nikolić who had finished his coaching career and now acted as a coaching consultant, Maljković set about molding the obvious raw basketball talent this young squad possessed. In interviews with the local press, he identified lack of recognizable playing structure as the problem he wants the team to overcome. To that end, in stark contrast to his predecessor Slavnić, Maljković insisted on strict discipline as well as frequent and exhausting training sessions, believing the sheer quantity of work put in will eventually yield results for Jugoplastika against its formidable Yugoslav League rivals such as reigning European champion Cibona led by 22-year-old Dražen Petrović, reigning league champion Zadar, young and up-and-coming Parizan, and experienced Crvena zvezda. Maljković's first season in charge already provided some encouraging signs as Jugoplastika finished the league regular season with a 15–7 record, which was enough for the 3rd spot (behind 22–0 Cibona and 18–4 Partizan) and a playoff berth.

The season in Europe was not as promising. Drawn in a round-robin group with Olympique Antibes, Divarese Varese, and FC Barcelona, Jugoplastika managed only two wins in its six games, finishing last and getting eliminated from the 1986–87 FIBA Korać Cup at the very first hurdle.

Back in the Yugoslav league, in the playoff semifinal best-of-3 series Jugoplastika lost 2–1 to Duško Vujošević-coached Partizan led by youngsters Saša Đorđević, Vlade Divac, and Žarko Paspalj. In many ways the two teams mirrored one another – they both had young head coaches who both took over their respective teams in the summer of 1986 while both teams also had a variety of young talent on their respective rosters. Maljković and his Jugoplastika lost this battle to Vujošević's Partizan, but it would prove to be only the first of many in the years to come.

==== 1987–88: Yugoslav League champions ====
During the summer 1987 off-season, Maljković identified a need for more experience on the roster in order to make a deeper playoff run. He thus brought in Duško Ivanović, experienced small forward from Budućnost who was about to turn 30. Young Jugoplastika starlets Kukoč and Rađa were selected by the Yugoslav national team head coach Krešimir Ćosić for EuroBasket 1987 where the team took bronze after losing to Greece in the semis. Later that summer the two were picked again for national team duty, this time by the under-19 national team coach Svetislav Pešić for the Under-19 World Cup in Bormio. Yugoslav youth team steamrolled over the competition, including the USA team, with Kukoč dropping 11 three-pointers on them from 12 attempts.

Coming back to Split for the club season start in the fall, team leaders Kukoč and Rađa were brimming with confidence and fitness. Jugoplastika started off the season tremendously, piling up wins in the Yugoslav League. Simultaneously, in Korać Cup, they easily made it to the quarterfinal group featuring CAI Zaragoza, Hapoel Tel Aviv, and Arexons Cantù, but lost all three of its away games for the 3–3 group record that wasn't good enough to progress to the semifinals. Back on the domestic league front, Jugosplastika continued its great run to finish the regular season 21–1.

==== 1988–89: Euroleague champions, Yugoslav League title repeat ====
During summer 1988, Maljković brought in 20-year-old point guard Luka Pavićević from Cibona.

==== 1989–90 treble: Euroleague repeat, Yugoslav League three-peat, and Yugoslav Cup ====
During the summer 1989 off-season, Maljković and club general-manager Josip Bilić faced a crisis over Rađa's status after the young center got drafted by Boston Celtics in late June. Under contract with Jugoplastika until 1992, the 22-year-old expressed willingness to join Boston right away "if the financial offer is good", but the Split club was adamant they would not release him. Maljković even publicly called on Yugoslav Basketball Association (KSJ) to adopt safeguard policies, preventing players younger than 26 from transferring to NBA teams. After weeks of wrangling over his status, Rađa tried to force Jugoplastika's hand by acting unilaterally – flying over to the U.S. and signing a one-year contract with the Celtics, reportedly in the neighbourhood of $500,000. However, seeing the situation as a clear case of contract poaching by Boston and its GM Jan Volk, the Split club wouldn't give up the legal fight. They took the case to US courts that ruled in their favour in late September, prohibiting Rađa from playing for the Celtics thus forcing him to work out some kind of an agreement with Jugoplastika. In the middle of the Rađa saga, not knowing its outcome, Maljković did some contingency planning by bringing in 22-year-old Zoran Savić from Čelik Zenica who could play both the center and power forward positions. He also brought in point guard Petar Naumoski and power forward Aramis Naglić.

Starting the new season, as the reigning European champion, Maljković's team got invited to participate at the McDonald's Open in Rome in late October 1989. Before the tournament, Maljković got presented with the European Coach of the Year award. The friendly tournament was also Maljković's first chance to coach against an NBA team as his Jugoplastika put in a great effort against Doug Moe's Denver Nuggets featuring small forward Alex English, guard Fat Lever, and veteran Walter Davis, losing 129–135 in a run-and-gun contest.

=== FC Barcelona ===
After four spectacular seasons at Split, Maljković became one of the most sought-after coaches in Europe. He accepted FC Barcelona's offer, taking over in summer 1990. With four consecutive Spanish League titles behind them, Barça were looking for European success that continually eluded it. In fact, it was Maljković's Jugoplastika that knocked Barça consecutively out of two previous Final Fours (1989 semifinal and 1990 final). With Maljković's arrival, the previous head coach Aíto García moved to an administrative role, becoming the club's new general manager.

The relationship between new head coach Maljković and new general manager Aíto was fraught from the very beginning. Barça ended up with a fairly thin roster consisting of a few experienced players such as Audie Norris, Piculín Ortiz, Steve Trumbo, Nacho Solozábal, and Epi as well as a slew of youngsters like José Luis Galilea, Roger Esteller, Ángel Almeida, and Lisard González, most of them called up from the club's youth system. Maljković also got a club-assigned assistant Manolo Flores.

Maljković's team did well to make the Euroleague final four, however they fell at the very last hurdle, losing to his former team Pop 84. Later that season they failed to win the domestic league as well while Spanish King's Cup came as bit of a consolation.

In a 2015 interview, talking about his 1990–91 season at Barça, Maljković recalled the tension within the club's front office:

They left me with a very weak roster. And it was weak due to Aíto García consciously deciding to make it weak because he wanted to show no one other than himself could coach Barça. Coming into the club, I had my doubts whether he'd be collegial and sure enough, he wasn't. He sold Ferran Martínez to Joventut and in doing so strengthened our biggest league rival. Quim Costa left the club much the same way. I also coached the team the entire season without having Andrés Jiménez at my disposal because he decided, upon suggestions from club management, to go have knee cleaning surgery even though he didn't have to and thus missed the whole season...... From his newly assumed general manager position, Aíto also influenced club president Josep Lluís Núñez and Salvador Alemany not to sign off on the Toni Kukoč transfer, which I had previously arranged with even a pre-contract signed and sealed. Then, when the Kukoč transfer fell through, I told them I wanted Žarko Paspalj, but Aíto again came up with some lame excuse why that's not possible either.... I mean, it was obstruction every step of the way.... Then I staged a bit of a revolt by taking this absurdity to the very extreme by announcing I'm going to play the season with junior players. Eventually, I did basically end up with a bunch of kids on the roster.... Just a few weeks ago, Manolo Flores, my assistant from my days as Barça's head coach, phoned me to tell me about being at a club function where they went down memory lane by having giant team photos of all Barça rosters throughout history on display, and he told me that the 1990–91 roster elicited most laughs amongst the gathered crowd of Barça players past and present.

Maljković started the 1991–92 season at Barcelona, but on 22 November 1991, fourteen games into the league season, he decided to resign.

=== Limoges CSP ===
Maljković wouldn't be without a head coaching job for long as barely just over a month later in January 1992, he took over Limoges mid-season. Led on the court by 32-year-old veteran Richard Dacoury, the team made the league playoffs final versus Pau-Orthez, but lost the best-of-three series 0–2 despite having the home-court advantage.

The summer 1992 arrival of thirty-one-year-old veteran Michael Young as well as established Slovenian point guard Jure Zdovc from Knorr Bologna and power forward Jim Bilba set the club on an improbable run. Playing suffocating defense with low-scoring games, Maljković's Limoges ended up winning the French League and the EuroLeague title. Drawn in a tough EuroLeague round robin group with Dušan Ivković-coached Greek champions PAOK featuring fresh NBA arrival Cliff Levingston as well as holdovers Panagiotis Fasoulas, Ken Barlow, and Bane Prelević, Ettore Messina's eager-for-Euro-success Knorr Bologna led by freshly arrived rising star Saša Danilović, EuroLeague runners-up Joventut Marbella led by the Jofresa brothers (Rafa and Tomás) and Jordi Villacampa, Maccabi Electra with veterans Doron Jamchi and David Ancrum, Scavolini Pesaro featuring emerging star Carlton Myers and veteran Walter Magnifico, few gave modest-looking Limoges roster much of a chance. Throughout the season, they produced unbalanced scoring with Young usually getting more than 30 points per game along with a handful of others contributing with less than 5 points. Maljković received some flak for this playing style; Petar Skansi, the head coach of Benetton Treviso called him out for "playing anti-basketball" after their EuroLeague final in April 1993.

=== Panathinaikos ===
In summer 1995, Maljković took the offer from Greek giants Panathinaikos, a club bankrolled by the pharmaceutical riches of the Giannakopoulos brothers – Pavlos and Thanasis – who invested heavily in search of elusive EuroLeague and domestic league success. The club was coming off yet another season of disappointment as they finished second in the Greek League to bitter rivals Olympiacos, while the EuroLeague Final Four semifinal loss, again to Olympiacos, came as an even more bitter pill.

Maljković's work was thus very clearly cut out for him, nothing less than the EuroLeague or Greek League title, preferably both, would do. Taking over for head coach Efthimis Kioumourtzoglou, Maljković found a squad led by holdovers Panagiotis Giannakis, Kostas Patavoukas, Nikos Oikonomou, Fragiskos Alvertis, Christos Myriounis, Miroslav Pecarski and Stojko Vranković, while the squad leader Žarko Paspalj left along with coach Kioumourtzoglou, both victims of the trophy-less season. However, the roster was about to get a big boost as the Giannakopoulos brothers managed to bring in 35-year-old NBA legend Dominique Wilkins to Athens, signing him to a two-year contract worth US$7 million. The arrival of Wilkins created a lot of buzz around the club as 5,000 fans greeted him upon landing at the Athens airport in September 1995. The next day some 13,000 fans turned out for his first practice. In the coach's first season at the club, Maljković's Panathinaikos won the EuroLeague title, the club's first in its history.

Maljković coached Panathinaikos in the 1996–97 season to an 18–8 regular season record, which was enough for the 3rd spot that qualified it for the playoffs. However, as the playoffs were about to start the coach was let go on 13 April 1997 and replaced with Michalis Kyritsis.

=== Paris and Spain ===
Maljković then went to Paris SG, Unicaja, and Real Madrid.

After leaving Real Madrid, a lot of speculation appeared about his next coaching job. In an interview with Sportski žurnal, he said that he had been offered the role of head coach of the Lithuanian League club Žalgiris, but that he would only take the job in the summer, after the season had finished. He also said that he received several other offers, but refused to disclose which clubs they were from. Finally, on 9 March 2007, he was unveiled as the new head coach of TAU Cerámica, replacing Velimir Perasović, who abruptly stepped down in mid-season, for health reasons. Coincidentally, Maljković coached Perasović for four years at Jugoplastika.

However, after a heavy 14-point loss in the 2007 EuroLeague Final Four to Panathinakos, Maljković was criticized in the Spanish press, and a lot of speculation appeared about his future. During the off season, he and the club parted ways.

On 12 December 2010, he took over the senior Slovenian national basketball team.

=== Lokomotiv Kuban ===
In the summer of 2011, Maljković also took over the Russian club Lokomotiv-Kuban. Although close to getting fired in November 2011, due to the club's position in the Russian League being way off expectations, he was allowed to stay, leading the team to the final four of the VTB United League.

He left at the end of the season in May 2012.

=== Cedevita ===
On 1 July 2012, Maljković was formally presented as new coach of Croatian vice-champions Cedevita from Zagreb. On 20 November 2012 he resigned as head coach, stating that he no longer had a will or desire to coach the team.

== Individual awards ==
- 2× Coach of the Year in Europe (1988–89, 1989–90)
- 2× European Coach of the Year awarded by FIBA Basket Magazine (1993, 1996)
- 3× Coach of the Year in Yugoslavia (1987–88, 1988–89, 1989–90)
- 2× Coach of the Year in France (1992–93, 1993–94)

== Coaching style ==
Maljković is known as a disciplinarian coach, stressing work ethic, holding grueling and frequent practice sessions. His coaching philosophy is based on defense, declaring in 1996, the year he won his second FIBA European Coach of the Year award: "What I considered to be good basketball was rejected by many people as lacking in spectacle, but I'm much happier and more likely to win 51–50 than to lose 128–124". He also stresses repetition as the key ingredient during practices:

Once you make it inside, pro basketball becomes a drill. It can be carefree fun in the beginning when you're prying a talented athletic kid away from other sports by only showing him the fun side of basketball, but afterward, it's hard drill. Any single move, say the left drive, requires between nine and eleven thousand repetitions in order to get it right. The defensive stance that we want the players to assume where your knees are constantly bent in an angle between 90 and 135 degrees isn't pleasant and comfortable. If it was, people would be walking around the street like that.

Maljković cites Aca Nikolić as the biggest professional influence and considers him "the best coach of all time, the best craftsman in our business". Out of respect for his mentor, Maljković campaigned in 2007 for the Belgrade Arena to be renamed "Professor Aleksandar Nikolić Arena". Although receiving public support from many influential individuals in Serbian basketball, the initiative was ultimately not implemented. Maljković also holds Ranko Žeravica in high esteem, considering him to be "the Dositej Obradović of Serbian basketball, making us basketball-literate".

On numerous occasions Maljković has stated that Toni Kukoč is the best player he's ever had an opportunity to coach. He also frequently praised Michael Young, Louis Bullock, and Audie Norris.

Upon taking over the young Jugoplastika team in 1986, Maljković explicitly forbid his players from celebrating baskets during games. Maljković said he didn't want his players "driving airplanes after three-pointers" citing reigning Euroleague champion and Yugoslav League rival KK Cibona's shooting guard Aco Petrović as a negative example in this regard. Instead, Maljković said he wanted his players to be "exemplary young men that no father in Yugoslavia would regret giving away his daughter to".

During his time at Panathinaikos, Maljković got a chance to coach former NBA star Dominique Wilkins as well as another prominent player from the NBA John Salley, brought in and given big contracts by the club's owner Pavlos Giannakopoulos. Maljković refused to modify his disciplinarian coaching style when it came to big-name players, treating them in the same stern and strict manner he treated others on the roster, all of which led to numerous run-ins with both Wilkins and Salley. Reporting on this, The New York Times described Maljković as "likely to act less like Phil Jackson and more like Bobby Knight" while Sports Illustrated referred to him as "an austere Serb who believes in my-way-or-Yugo discipline".

His often stated distaste for the NBA is also well known. In 2009, Maljković said:

I'm not charmed by NBA basketball at all, and I'll tell you why. Firstly, scattered among 30-odd clubs in that league you've only got about 40 or so truly outstanding players. The rest are bit-part protagonists just adding to the glamour and spectacle of it all – I'm not even sure whether these support guys would even cut it in EuroLeague. Secondly, the entire regular season is a walk in the park without intensity and without good defense. I'd rather watch, say, Cibona play Partizan anytime over any NBA game. To be fair, the level of play in the NBA increases once the playoffs begin..... But, in general, that whole NBA-patented system of putting the individual player ahead of the team is something I have deep problems with. I remember back when I coached Panathinaikos, my friend Ivica Dukan who at the time worked as a scout for Chicago Bulls brought Chicago's GM Jerry Krause to my house in Athens. Among various things we discussed, Krause told me that once Michael Jordan retires, basketball will become the 4th sport in the U.S., which to me seemed excessive at the time, but now I see that the man was completely right. They lost 25% of their overall TV audience, essentially because one guy retired. On the other hand they've got less and less good, truly sound players, and less and less head coaches who truly run their teams all because they keep insisting on this star-system, looking for the new Michael.

== Administrative career ==
In October 2009, Maljković became a member of the KK Crvena zvezda managing board.

=== Olympic Committee of Serbia ===
On 9 May 2017, Maljković was elected president of the Olympic Committee of Serbia (OKS). He thus succeeded Serbian former basketball player Vlade Divac who had been performing the role since 2009. Being the sole candidate for the post since the only other candidate, Ivan Todorov, dropped out four months earlier, Maljković was elected by acclamation.

Earlier in March 2017, two months before the OKS presidential elections, Dušan Ivković, famous Serbian basketball coach and longtime administrator in the Serbian Basketball Federation (KSS), publicly criticized the election process and further alleged that Maljković is being installed to the post by the Serbian Prime Minister Aleksandar Vučić: "No one [from Serbian basketball] seems to be brave enough to publicly talk about the OKS presidential election. The OKS statute has just been changed and nobody says a peep. Vučić is ramming down everything in his path in order to install Boža Maljković as the head of the OKS and no one says anything. Everyone knows it, but they're keeping silent. I don't want to name names, but when I ask my basketball administrator friends from the KSS: 'Are you supportive of this Boža thing', they answer 'No' privately. But no one wants to say a word publicly; that's the fear I've been talking about".

== Personal life ==
Maljković is the father of Marina Maljković (born 1981), also a professional basketball coach.

=== Row with Vlade Divac ===
In August 2011, during the EuroBasket 2011 preparations, Slovenia head coach Maljković opened a public row with the Serbian Olympic Committee (OKS) president Vlade Divac, calling the former player a "fraudster and a liar" in Croatian sports daily newspaper Sportske novosti as a response to Divac's remark in Slovenian media that Slovenia would've been better off keeping Jure Zdovc as head coach instead of hiring Maljković. The coach expanded on his insults, adding: "Divac isn't even aware that I got the Slovenia job after Memi Bečirović, not after Zdovc. The journalist talking to Divac wasn't kind to him, ringing him up before noon. Considering Divac usually wakes up around 3pm, he was probably still delirious". When told of Maljković's comments, Divac refused to be drawn into name calling through the media, refusing to say anything more on the subject. However, Maljković wasn't done, reacting to Divac's non-response with more insults and veiled accusations: "Divac crossed a line. Every so often he's got excesses like this one in the media. We're two different worlds. It's up to him now whether he wants to start in with me because I got an elaborate file showing what he's all about. I'd only like to add one more thing to my original statement. Divac is a huge fraudster and a huge liar". The row even prompted 86-year-old Bora Stanković, the Serbian basketball's elder statesman, to register his displeasure publicly, scolding both sides.

Six years later in August 2017, Maljković returned to blasting Divac in the Serbian media. Now the Serbian Olympic Committee (OKS) president himself, a post in which he had just succeeded Divac a few months earlier, Maljković accused his OKS predecessor of scuttling Saša Đorđević's previous OKS presidency bid in 2008 by organizing "illegal elections within the OKS with the help of Deputy Prime Minister Ivica Dačić whom Divac advised at the time".

=== Political views ===
In a March 2016 Večernje novosti interview, Maljković expressed public support for the Serbian Prime Minister Aleksandar Vučić, announcing intention to vote for the incumbent officeholder at the upcoming parliamentary election while adding: "I've met with Vučić three times in my life. First, when he was in opposition, we had lunch at Le Molière on Zmaj Jovina [Street]. Then, second time, at the SNS convention to which he had invited me and where I told him: 'I'm here for you whenever you need me, the guys [in power in Serbia] before you never did'. And the third time was when I went to him to correct that historical injustice [about no venue in Serbia being named after Aca Nikolić] where he reacted phenomenally to my suggestion of changing Pionir's name to the Aleksandar Nikolić Hall. Just like he had a monument built in honour of Borislav Pekić, yet another thing the guys [in power in Serbia] before him didn't do. We have a relationship based on mutual respect, I see a tremendous work ethic in him. I won't take part in his election campaign for now, but I'll vote for him".

== See also ==
- List of EuroLeague-winning head coaches

Civic offices
| Preceded by Vlade Divac | President of the Olympic Committee of Serbia; 9 May 2017 – | Succeeded by Dejan Tomašević |
