= Dino Rađa =

Croatian basketball player (born 1967)

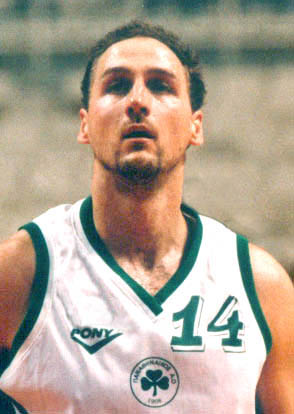
- Rađa with Panathinaikos in 1998.

Personal information
- Born: 24 April 1967 (age 59) Split, SR Croatia, SFR Yugoslavia
- Listed height: 6 ft 11 in (2.11 m)
- Listed weight: 225 lb (102 kg)

Career information
- NBA draft: 1989: 2nd round, 40th overall pick
- Drafted by: Boston Celtics
- Playing career: 1985–2003
- Position: Power forward / center
- Number: 40, 14

Career history
- 1985–1990: Jugoplastika
- 1990–1993: Virtus Roma
- 1993–1997: Boston Celtics
- 1997–1999: Panathinaikos
- 1999–2000: Zadar
- 2000–2001: Olympiacos
- 2001–2002: Cibona
- 2002–2003: Split

Career highlights
- NBA All-Rookie Second Team (1994); 2× EuroLeague champion (1989, 1990); EuroLeague Final Four MVP (1989); 2× FIBA European Selection (1991 2×); 3× FIBA EuroStar (1997–1999); 50 Greatest EuroLeague Contributors (2008); FIBA Korać Cup champion (1992); LBA All-Star Game MVP (1991); 2× LBA All-Star (1991, 1992); 2× Greek League champion (1998, 1999); Greek League Finals MVP (1998); Greek League Hall of Fame (2022); 3× Yugoslav League champion (1988–1990); Yugoslav Cup winner (1990); 2× Croatian League champion (2002, 2003); 2× Croatian Cup winner (2000, 2002); Croatian Cup MVP (2000); FIBA's 50 Greatest Players (1991)

Career NBA statistics
- Points: 3,733 (16.7 ppg)
- Rebounds: 1,883 (8.4 rpg)
- Assists: 356 (1.6 apg)
- Stats at NBA.com
- Stats at Basketball Reference
- Basketball Hall of Fame
Medals
Men's basketball
Representing Yugoslavia
Summer Olympic Games
Silver medal – second place	1988 Seoul
EuroBasket
Bronze medal – third place	1987 Greece
Gold medal – first place	1989 Yugoslavia
Gold medal – first place	1991 Italy
Goodwill Games
Gold medal – first place	1990 Seattle
U19 World Cup
Gold medal – first place	1987 Italy	Under-19
European U-18 Championship
Gold medal – first place	1986 Austria	Under-18
Representing Croatia
Summer Olympic Games
Silver medal – second place	1992 Barcelona
FIBA World Cup
Bronze medal – third place	1994 Canada
EuroBasket
Bronze medal – third place	1993 Germany
Bronze medal – third place	1995 Greece

Dino Rađa (alternatively Radja, Croatian pronunciation: [ˌdǐːno ˈrâd͜ʑa]; born 24 April 1967) is a Croatian former professional basketball player. He was a member of the Jugoplastika team of the late 1980s and early 1990s, which he helped to win two FIBA European Champions Cup championships (1989 and 1990). He spent three and a half seasons with the Boston Celtics, being one of the European pioneers in the National Basketball Association (NBA). Rađa was named one of FIBA's 50 Greatest Players in 1991, and one of the 50 Greatest EuroLeague Contributors in 2008. He was inducted into the Basketball Hall of Fame, as a member of the 2018 class. He was inducted into the Greek Basket League Hall of Fame, in 2022.

== Club career ==
=== Split ===
Rađa began his basketball life in his native town, as a junior at KK Dalvin. He moved to KK Split, which at the time went under the name of its longtime naming-rights sponsor Jugoplastika. At KK Split, Rađa starred alongside Toni Kukoč, while both were teenagers. The duo led the team to dominance of the FIBA European Champions Cup, with repeat championship seasons in (1989 and 1990).

==== 1989–90: Defection to NBA, court-ordered return to Yugoslavia, and another Yugoslav & European title ====
On 27 June 1989, two days after winning the EuroBasket 1989 championship with Yugoslavia and making the All-Tournament Team, the 22-year-old center got drafted by the Boston Celtics in the second round as the 40th pick. Rađa was reportedly on a vacation in Bologna, Italy with his girlfriend while the Celtics were drafting him in New York City's Felt Forum. Right away, he publicly expressed willingness to immediately go to Boston "if the financial offer is good", and thus join fellow Yugoslavs Vlade Divac, Dražen Petrović, and Žarko Paspalj, who were also on their way to the NBA that summer.

However, led by the club's general manager Josip Bilić, vice-president Igor Katunarić, and executive board vice-president Željko Jerkov, Jugoplastika was adamant Rađa would not be released since they had him under contract until 1992. The entire case quickly turned into a months-long saga that played out in the Yugoslav media. The club's head coach, Božidar Maljković, even publicly called on the Yugoslav Basketball Association (KSJ) to adopt safeguard policies, preventing players younger than age 26 from transferring to NBA teams. After weeks of wrangling over his status, Rađa tried to force Jugoplastika's hand by travelling to the U.S. and, on 1 August 1989, unilaterally signing a one-year contract with the Celtics, reportedly worth in the neighborhood of US$500,000. He furthermore began practicing with the team at their Brandeis University training facilities. However, seeing the situation as a clear case of contract poaching by Boston and its general manager Jan Volk (who claimed Rađa's contract with Jugoplastika was amateur and thus non-binding), the Split club would not budge. Jugoplastika hired legal representation from the New York City-based Parcher, Arisohn & Hayes law firm, seeking an injunction to prevent Rađa from playing for the Celtics on the grounds that he has a valid and legally binding contract with them and further looking for US$6 million in damages on the grounds of "damaged reputation and lost income". The case ended up before the United States district court for the District of Massachusetts. Following a hearing on 26 September 1989, Judge Douglas Woodlock ruled in Jugoplastika's favor two days later thus preventing Rađa from staying with the Celtics. Since the player was physically already in Boston, bringing him back to Yugoslavia required some kind of an agreement. By mid-November 1989, Jugoplastika and the Celtics agreed to terms under which the center went back to complete the 1989–90 season in Split before having the rights to his services transferred to the Celtics effective 1 June 1990. The deal centered around the Celtics paying an undisclosed sum of money to Jugoplastika, which in turn agreed to let Rađa go two years short of his contract's completion.

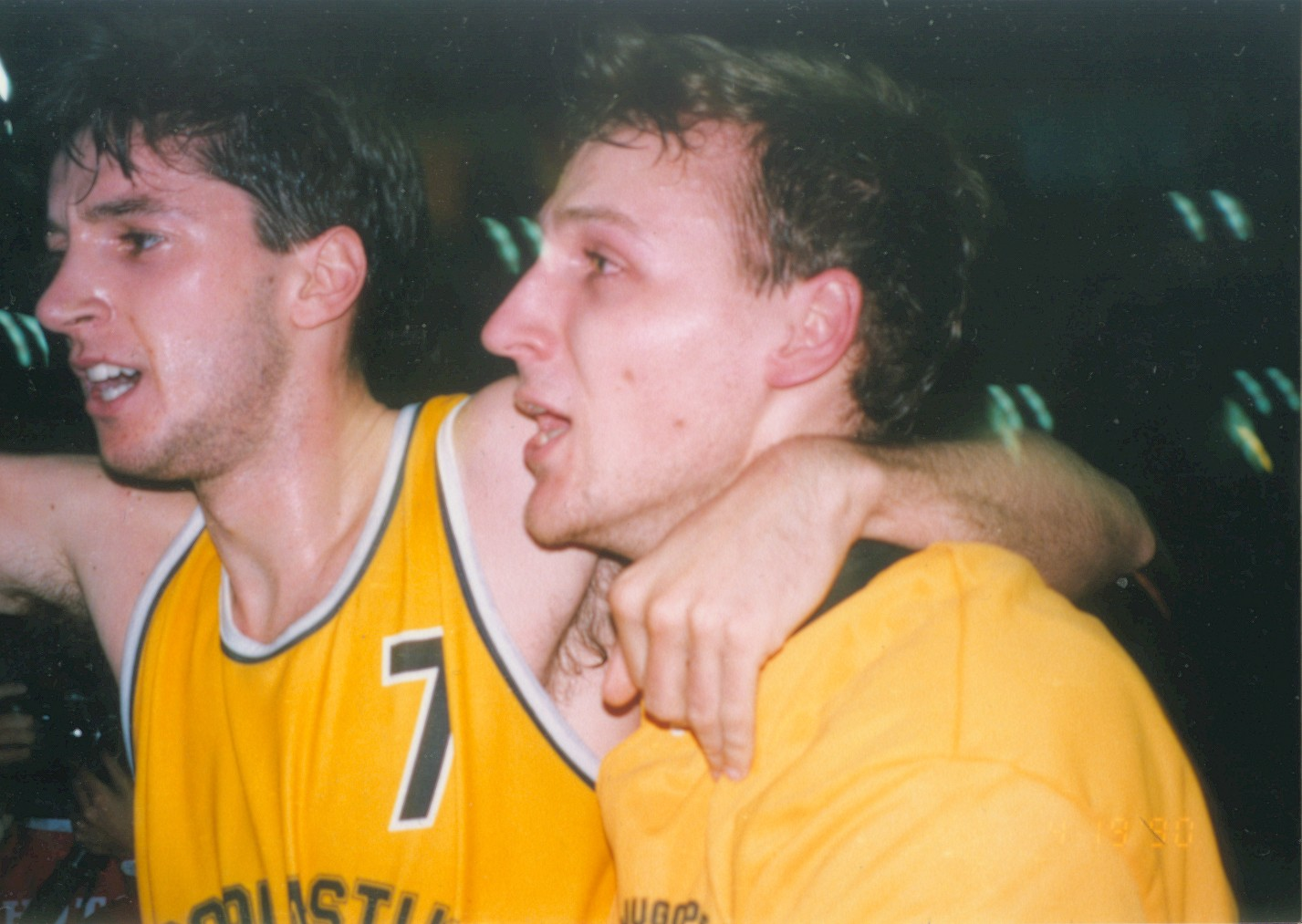
Rađa celebrating Split's second consecutive continental title with teammate Toni Kukoč after beating FC Barcelona at the European Champions Cup Final Four final game in Zaragoza on 19 April 1990.

Rađa was thus back in Split for the 1989–90 season. That same season, Jugoplastika again won the Yugoslav League, its third consecutive national domestic league title, as well as its second straight FIBA European Champions Cup.

Despite the team's success, as previously agreed, Rađa would not stay in Split past June 1990 thus relinquishing the chance to go for the historic FIBA European Champions Cup three-peat (which the club, led by Kukoč, achieved the following year), but he would not go to Boston either.

=== Rome ===
In August 1990, instead of going to the NBA as previously agreed, Rađa ended up in Italy, signing with the wealthy Virtus Roma despite claiming all along that he had wanted to join the Celtics. He had a change of heart once Virtus, an ambitious and financially stable club bankrolled by the Gruppo Ferruzzi food company and sponsored by the Il Messaggero daily broadsheet, made him an offer reportedly in the US$15–18 million range for a 5-year contract. Italian and Yugoslav newspapers reported that Rađa's L3.6 billion (~US$3 million) annual salary at the time at Virtus was higher than soccer superstars Diego Maradona's and Roberto Baggio's annual compensations at Napoli and Juventus, respectively. The Boston Celtics did not insist on Rađa honouring his commitment to them, instead letting the twenty-three-year-old go to Virtus in return for an undisclosed amount, but retaining his NBA rights. Reportedly, part of the reason Boston did not put up much of a fight when the player suddenly decided to sign with Virtus was the July 1990 court decision against them following a motion by Rađa's American agent, Marc Fleisher, after the Virtus offer came in. Taking advantage of an administrative loophole, Fleisher claimed that Rađa's contract with the Celtics violated a provision of the agreement between the league and the NBA players that said, among other things, that one-year contracts could not be extended. A special officer of the court had heard the case and ruled in Rađa's favour, against the Celtics.

Simultaneous to the legal battle his agent was waging over the future of his club career, Rađa had been spending the summer of 1990 with the Yugoslav national team in a four-month 1990 FIBA World Championship training camp that included an appearance at the 1990 Goodwill Games in Seattle where the 23-year-old suffered a leg fracture in the final game against the U.S. national team, ruling him out of the World Championship that started a week later. Yugoslavia head coach Dušan Ivković later revealed that injured Rađa and the center's agent Marc Fleisher asked him not to publicly disclose the player's injury before the deal with Virtus is signed, which Ivković consented to.

Some observers saw Virtus' sudden and lucrative contract offer to Rađa as their retribution to the Celtics for going to court a few months earlier over enforcing Virtus' point guard Brian Shaw's NBA contract and winning the case even after the player, who had spent the preceding 1989–90 season with Virtus, tried to remain in Rome.

In 2005, commenting on his summer 1990 decision to stay in Europe, even after only a year prior seeming desperately intent on playing in the NBA, Rađa said:

I was playing well. I was making a great salary in Europe. The thing about playing in the NBA was that there were so many unknowns. The NBA was more physical because the players were bigger and stronger than in Europe. I also would have had to get used to an entirely different culture.

==== 1990–91 season ====
Rađa averaged 17.9 points in the Italian League in his first season with Il Messaggero (Virtus Roma enjoyed sponsorship from that popular Roman newspaper at the time). European sports journalists voted him the second best European player that season, behind only his former teammate and friend Kukoč.

He improved his scoring average each of the next two seasons with the Roman club, averaging 20.3 and 21.7 points in the Italian League, respectively.

In 1992, he led Virtus to a European 3rd-tier level FIBA Korać Cup title.

=== Boston Celtics ===
Rađa finally joined the Celtics in the summer of 1993, signing a three-year contract on 9 July, four years after initial interest from both parties and the voided contract in 1989. Some two and a half weeks later, the team went through a shocking incident when the Celtics' leading scorer, small forward Reggie Lewis, died on the basketball court at the team's Brandeis University practice facility after suffering sudden cardiac death from a heart defect.

Playing alongside Dee Brown, 40-year-old veteran Robert Parish, and Rick Fox, twenty-six-year-old Rađa averaged 15.1 points and 7.2 rebounds in his debut season during which he made $1.5 million in salary. With a 32–50 regular season record, the Celtics missed the NBA playoffs, finishing 10th overall in the eastern conference. At the end of the season, Rađa was voted to the NBA All-Rookie Second Team, along with Kukoč, who had just completed his rookie campaign with the Chicago Bulls.

In early November 1994, at the start of his second season with the Celtics, Rađa was looking for a contract extension on his existing three-year deal, which was expiring in the summer of 1996. With his agent Mark Fleisher engaged in long negotiations with the Celtics brass led by GM Jan Volk, the deal was reached to add three more years to Rađa's existing contract beginning with the 1996–97 season.

The 1996–97 season, Rađa's fourth in Boston, was marked by a left knee injury that forced him to miss 57 regular season games. In January 1997, he underwent arthroscopic surgery on his knee. The Celtics finished the season dead-last in their division, with a 15–67 record, the worst in the eastern conference, forcing a coaching change at the end of the season, with Rick Pitino replacing M. L. Carr.

In June 1997, a trade that was to send thirty-year-old Rađa to the Philadelphia 76ers (in exchange for Clarence Weatherspoon and Michael Cage) fell through when Rađa failed his 24 June 1997 physical with the 76ers. Apparently, the 76ers staffers that examined Rađa determined he had no cartilage in his left knee, estimating that "because his left knee is bone-on-bone, he can play games, but he can't practice afterwards, because his knee will swell" and that "he can't play four games in six days". The Celtics initially challenged the 76ers' decision to void the trade, but quickly dropped their arbitration request. Rađa had three more years left on his guaranteed contract and, according to the NBA regulations, if he was to fail another team's physical, the Celtics would have to pay his entire remaining salary. Unconvinced about Rađa's physical condition, the Celtics gave up on trying to trade him, instead agreeing a buyout of the three years that remained on his contract. Following the buyout, the Celtics waived Rađa on 16 July 1997.

In 2005, Rađa talked about his exit from Boston:

I went to Pitino and asked him if I fit into his plans. With a new coach, I obviously wanted to know what he thought of my game. I loved playing for Boston and just wanted to find out if there was any possibility I might be traded, because I had heard some rumours. Pitino looked me right in the eyes and said, "Dino, don't worry. You're going to be a big part of our offense. When we run a set play, the ball is going to go through you.' I left the meeting feeling great. Five days later, I found out I was being traded to Philadelphia. I can't tell you how much I felt betrayed. Either Pitino lied or something changed in a matter of a few days.

Over the course of his four seasons with the Celtics, Rađa averaged 16.7 points and 8.4 rebounds per game in the regular season. In the NBA playoffs, where he only made a single appearance with four games played, he averaged 15.0 points and 7.0 rebounds per game.

=== Return to Europe: Panathinaikos ===
In the wake of his failed physical in Philadelphia and Rick Pitino's unwillingness to keep him on the Celtics' roster, Rađa returned to Europe in July 1997, joining Panathinaikos, a rich and ambitious club bankrolled by the Giannakopoulos brothers (Pavlos and Thanasis) who made their money in the pharmaceutical industry.

For Panathinaikos' owners, finishing the previous disastrous 1996–97 season without any trophies (having previously, in the 1995–96 season, won both the FIBA European League and the Greek Cup) was deemed unacceptable, bringing about big changes to the team. The team's head coach Božidar Maljković (Rađa's mentor from his Split days) had already been released during the previous failed season, while his interim replacement, Michalis Kokalis, was let go in the summer of 1997 to make way for new head coach Slobodan Subotić. Also coming in alongside Rađa and coach Subotić, was 36-year-old NBA veteran Byron Scott from the LA Lakers.

Rađa spent two years in Athens, winning two Greek League championships, but in 1999, he returned to his native Croatia, to play for Zadar. He left Panathinaikos partly because of an encounter with the club president's son, Dimitrios Giannakopoulos, in the locker room after a game. The president's son, Dimitrios, allegedly cursed at the team's head coach Subotić, but at that time, Rađa did not know that the person he was arguing with was the son of the club's president. He left the club at the end of the season, after winning the Greek League finals against Olympiacos.

In 2000, he returned to Greece, joining Panathinaikos' long-time rivals, Olympiacos, in an unsuccessful attempt to regain the Greek League championship. With Olympiacos, on 16 October 2000, he scored his first points in the EuroLeague competition, under its new format in which it was run by Euroleague Basketball, in a match against Real Madrid.

He returned, once again, to Croatia, joining Cibona for the 2001–02 season. Rađa finished his career in 2003, by winning the Croatian League championship with his first team, Split CO.

== National team career ==
=== Yugoslavia ===
Rađa was on the senior men's Yugoslavian national team that won the silver medal in the 1988 Summer Olympic Games in Seoul. He was also a part of the golden Yugoslavian teams at the 1987 FIBA Under-19 World Championship in Bormio, Italy, EuroBasket 1989 in Zagreb and the EuroBasket 1991 in Rome.

=== Croatia ===
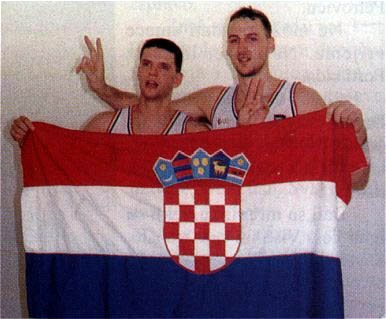
Rađa holding the flag of Croatia with his teammate Dražen Petrović.

Following Croatia's independence, Rađa became an important player of the senior men's Croatian national basketball team, most notably at the 1992 Summer Olympic Games in Barcelona, where Croatia won the silver medal. Rađa was also on the Croatian teams that won the bronze at the EuroBasket 1993 in Germany, 1994 FIBA World Championship in Toronto, and the EuroBasket 1995 in Athens. With 1,764 points scored, he was the all-time top scorer for the Croatian national team until 2018, when he was surpassed by Bojan Bogdanović.

== NBA career statistics ==
Legend
GP	Games played	GS	Games started	MPG	Minutes per game
FG%	Field goal percentage	3P%	3-point field goal percentage	FT%	Free throw percentage
RPG	Rebounds per game	APG	Assists per game	SPG	Steals per game
BPG	Blocks per game	PPG	Points per game	**Bold**	Career high

=== Regular season ===
Year	Team	GP	GS	MPG	FG%	3P%	FT%	RPG	APG	SPG	BPG	PPG
1993–94	Boston	**80**	47	28.8	**.521**	.000	.751	7.2	1.4	.9	.8	15.1
1994–95	Boston	66	48	32.5	.490	.000	**.759**	8.7	1.7	.9	1.3	17.2
1995–96	Boston	53	**52**	**37.4**	.500	—	.695	**9.8**	1.6	.9	1.5	**19.7**
1996–97	Boston	25	25	35.0	.440	.000	.718	8.4	**1.9**	.9	**1.9**	14.0
Career		224	172	32.6	.497	.000	.735	8.4	1.6	.9	1.3	16.7

=== Playoffs ===
Year	Team	GP	GS	MPG	FG%	3P%	FT%	RPG	APG	SPG	BPG	PPG
1995	Boston	4	3	38.3	.400	—	.714	7.0	2.3	1.0	1.3	15.0
Career		4	3	38.3	.400	—	.714	7.0	2.3	1.0	1.3	15.0

== Career achievements ==
=== Club titles ===
- 2× FIBA European Champions Cup winner: 1988–89, 1989–90
- FIBA Korać Cup winner: 1991–92
- 3× Yugoslav League champion: 1987–88, 1988–89, 1989–90
- Yugoslav Cup winner: 1989–90
- 2× Greek League champion: 1997–98, 1998–99
- 2× Croatian League champion: 2001–02, 2002–03
- 2× Croatian Cup winner: 1999–2000, 2001–02

=== Awards ===
- FIBA European Champions Cup Final Four MVP: 1989
- Italian All-Star Game MVP: 1991
- 2× FIBA European Selection: 1991 (I), 1991 (II)
- FIBA's 50 Greatest Players: 1991
- NBA All-Rookie Second Team: 1994
- 3× FIBA EuroStar: 1997, 1998, 1999
- Greek League Finals MVP: 1998
- Croatian Cup Final Four MVP: 2000
- Croatian Cup Final Four Top Scorer: 2000
- 50 Greatest EuroLeague Contributors: 2008
- Basketball Hall of Fame: 2018
- Greek Basket League Hall of Fame: 2022

== Personal life ==
=== Marriages ===
In 1985, eighteen-year-old Jugoplastika junior squad player Rađa began dating nineteen-year-old Solin-raised Željana Listeš, a basketball player in the club's women's team. The couple got married during late summer 1990 at Vatrogasni dom in Kaštel Sućurac right before Rađa's move to Rome to play for Virtus. Their son Duje was born in June 1997.

By the mid-1990s, Rađa began a romantic involvement with singer and 1995 Miss Croatia runner-up Viktorija Đonlić, that eventually led to divorce from his wife. Rađa married Đonlić, ten years his junior, in August 2001 on a yacht anchored off the coast of Korčula with singer Petar Grašo as his best man. In February 2003, the couple's child, son Roko, was born followed by son Niko in 2008.

=== Children ===
Rađa's son with Listeš, Duje Rađa, would follow in his parents' footsteps in pursuit of a professional basketball career, getting as far as NCAA Division I U.S. college basketball at Elon University, having prior come up through the U.S. high school basketball system with the Plainfield, New Hampshire-based private boarding school Kimball Union Academy.

Rađa's older son with Đonlić, Roko Rađa, has been pursuing professional basketball, representing Croatia at the under-16 level at the 2019 FIBA U16 European Championship.

== See also ==
- Basketball in the United States
- FIBA Europe
