= LNB Élite Best Coach =

The LNB Pro A Best Coach, or LNB Pro A Coach of the Year, is the annual award of the top-tier level men's professional club basketball league in France, the LNB Pro A.

== Best Coach winners ==
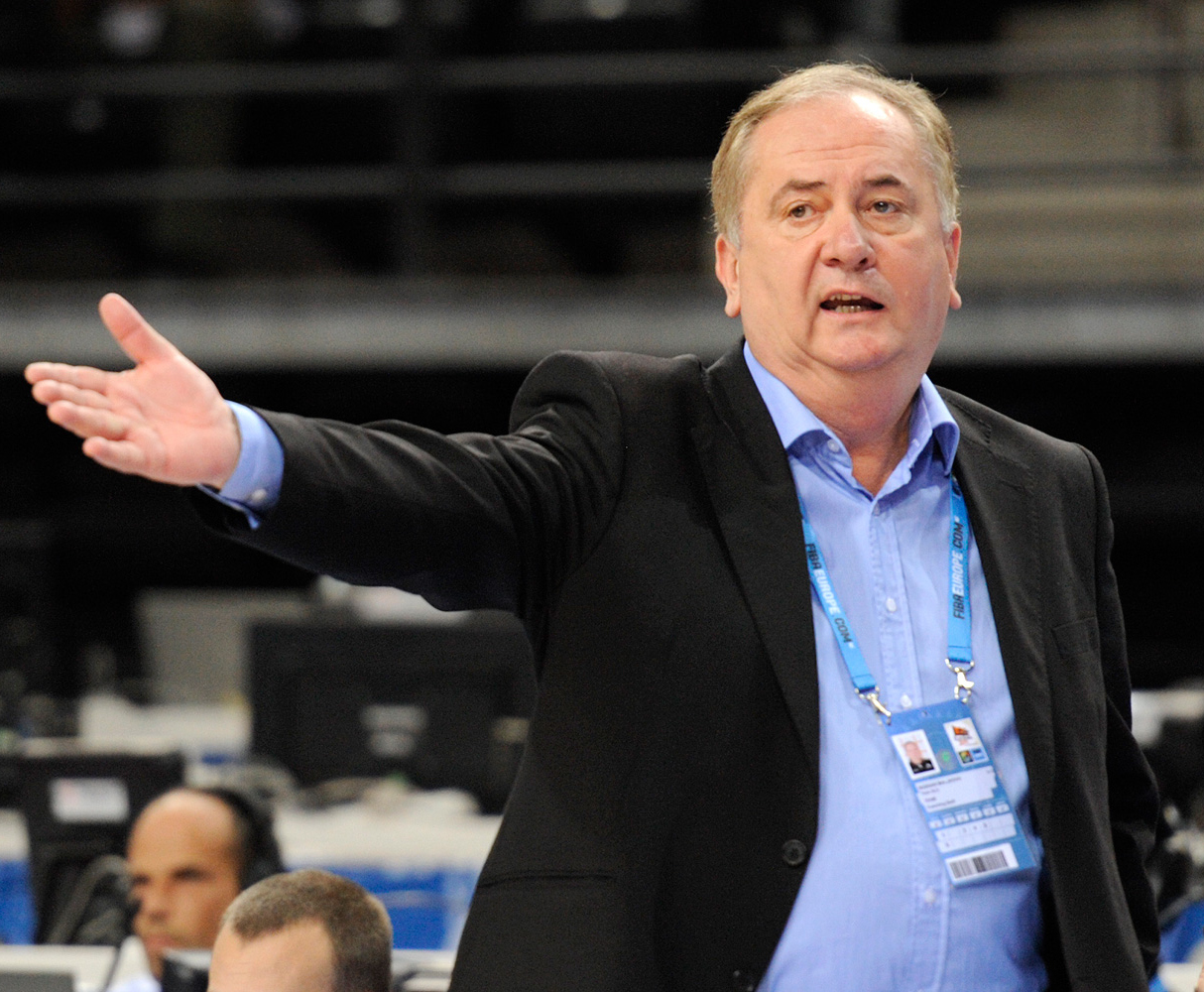
Božidar Maljković was a 2-time French League Coach of the Year (1993, and 1994).

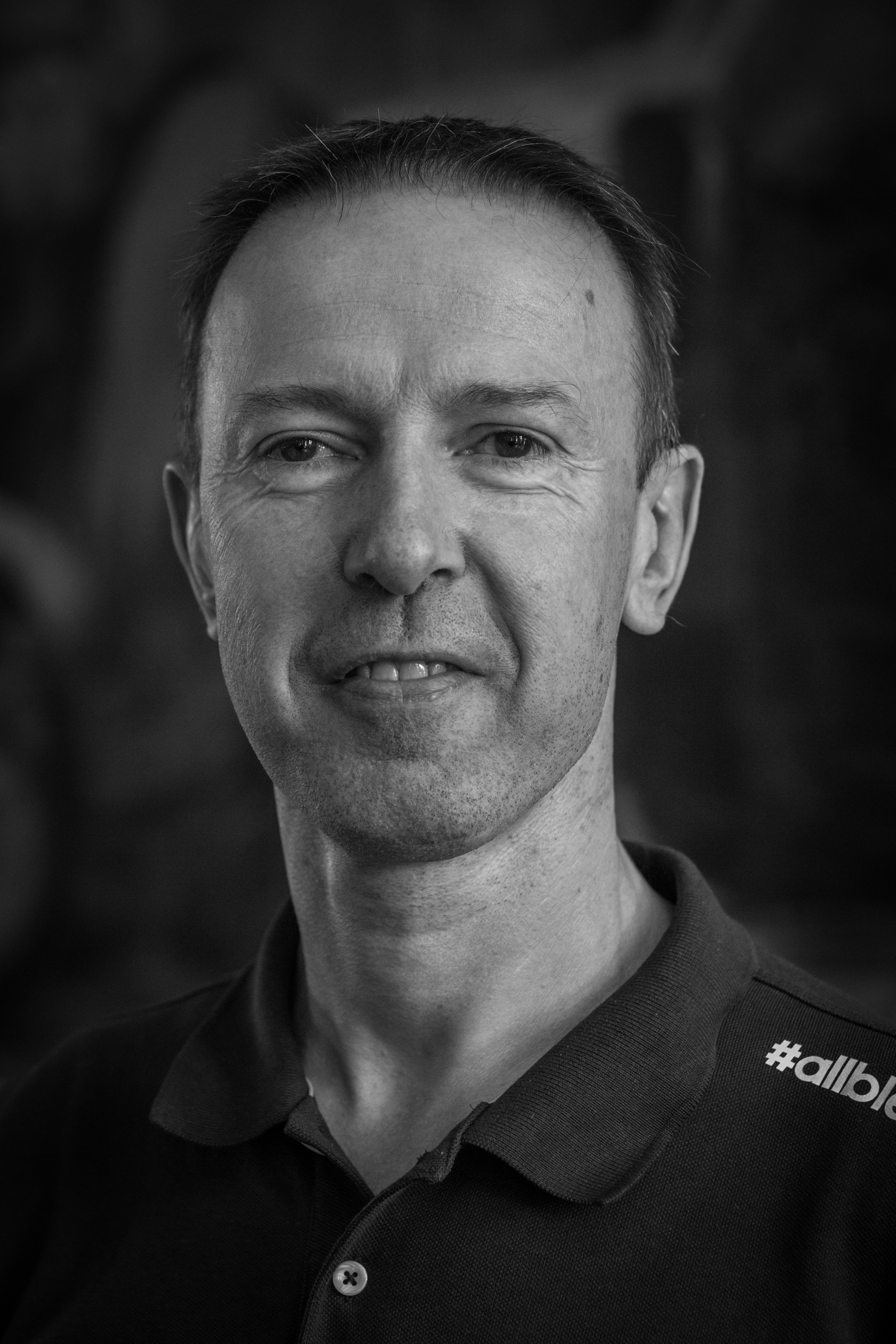
Vincent Collet was a 5-time French League Coach of the Year (2001, 2004, 2015, 2016), and 2022.

Season	Name	Club	Ref.
1985–86	(France) Michel Gomez	Vendée Challans Basket	
1986–87	(United States) George Fisher	Élan Béarnais Pau-Orthez	
1987–88	(France) Jean Galle	Cholet Basket	
1988–89	(France) Jean-Luc Monschau	FC Mulhouse Basket	
1989–90	(France) Michel Gomez (2×)	Limoges CSP	
1990–91	(France) Michel Gomez (3×)	Élan Béarnais Pau-Orthez	
1991–92	(France) Alain Thinet	Chorale Roanne Basket	
1992–93	(Federal Republic of Yugoslavia) Božidar Maljković	Limoges CSP	
1993–94	(Federal Republic of Yugoslavia) Božidar Maljković (2×)	Limoges CSP	
1994–95	(France) Jacques Monclar	Olympique Antibes	
1995–96	(France) Grégor Beugnot	ASVEL Basket	
1996–97	(France) Grégor Beugnot (2×)	ASVEL Basket	
1997–98	(France) Grégor Beugnot (3×)	ASVEL Basket	
1998–99	(France) Claude Bergeaud	Élan Béarnais Pau-Orthez	
1999–00	(France) Christophe Vitoux (Federal Republic of Yugoslavia) Duško Ivanović	Strasbourg IG; Limoges CSP	
2000–01	(France) Vincent Collet	Le Mans Sarthe Basket	
2001–02	(Federal Republic of Yugoslavia) Savo Vucević	Cholet Basket	
2002–03	(France) Frédéric Sarre	Élan Béarnais Pau-Orthez	
2003–04	(France) Vincent Collet (2×)	Le Mans Sarthe Basket	
2004–05	(France) Éric Girard	Strasbourg IG	
2005–06	(France) Frédéric Sarre (2×)	JL Bourg Basket	
2006–07	(France) Jean-Denys Choulet	Chorale Roanne Basket	
2007–08	(France) Christian Monschau	STB Le Havre	
2008–09	(France) Philippe Hervé	Orléans Loiret Basket	
2009–10	(France) Ruddy Nelhomme	Poitiers Basket 86	
2010–11	(Turkey) Erman Kunter	Cholet Basket	
2011–12	(France) Grégor Beugnot (4×)	Élan Chalon	
2012–13	(France) Christian Monschau (2×)	BCM Gravelines-Dunkerque	
2013–14	(France) Jean-Louis Borg	JDA Dijon Basket	
2014–15	(France) Vincent Collet (3×)	Strasbourg IG	
2015–16	(France) Vincent Collet (4×)	Strasbourg IG	
2016–17	(Montenegro) Zvezdan Mitrović	AS Monaco Basket	
2017–18	(Montenegro) Zvezdan Mitrović (2×)	AS Monaco Basket	
2018–19	(France) Pascal Donnadieu	Nanterre 92	
2019–20	Not awarded due to the COVID-19 pandemic		
2020–21	(Montenegro) Zvezdan Mitrović (3×)	AS Monaco Basket	
2021–22	(France) Vincent Collet (5×)	Levallois Metropolitans	
2022–23	(France) Laurent Vila	Cholet	
2023–24	(Finland) Tuomas Iisalo	Paris	
2024–25	(France) Fabrice Lefrançois	Cholet	
2025–26	(France) Julien Mahé	Nanterre 92	

== See also ==
- LNB Pro A Awards
- LNB Pro A
