= Dominique Wilkins =

American basketball player (born 1960)

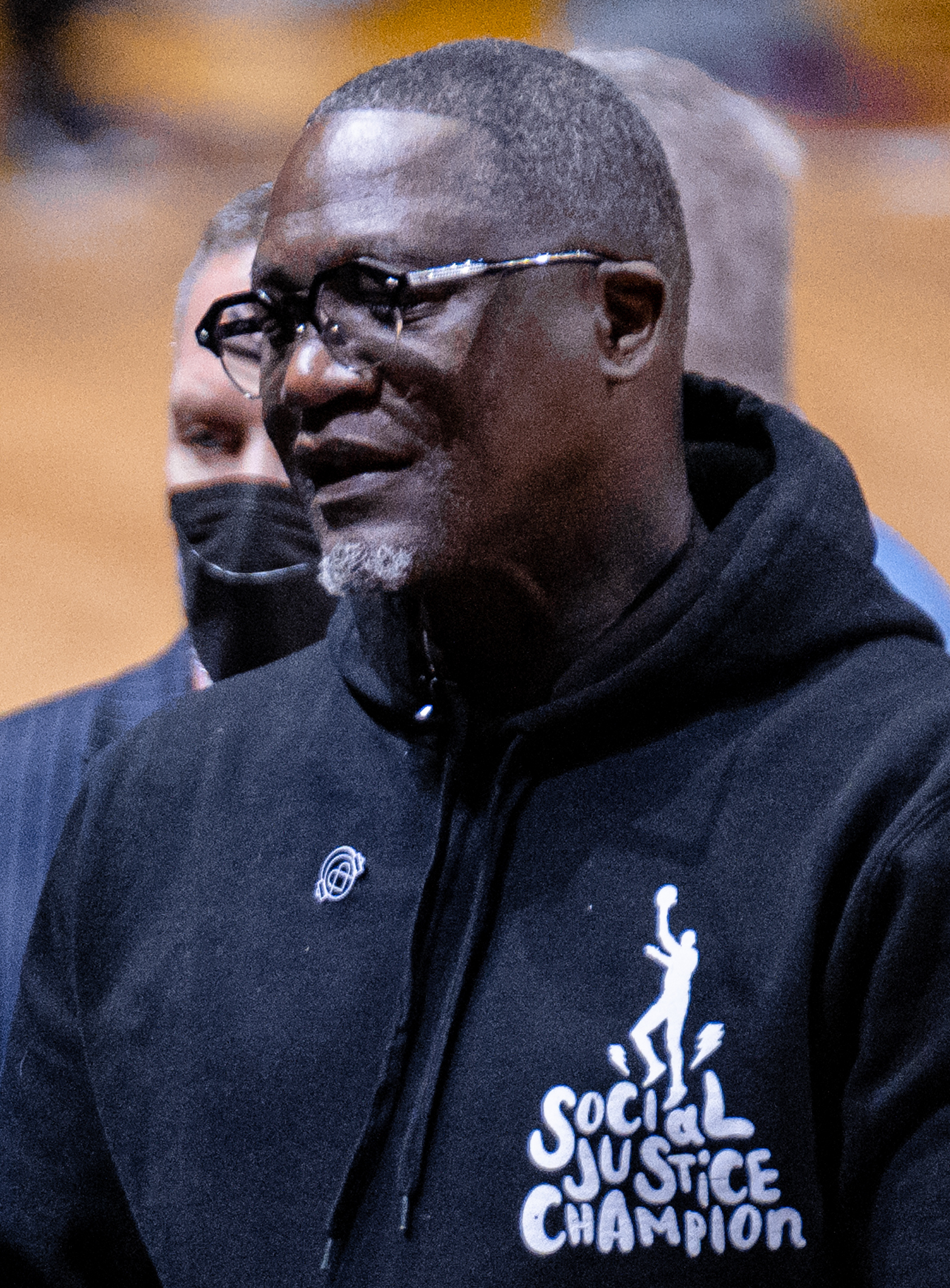
- Wilkins in 2022

Atlanta Hawks
- Title: Vice president of basketball operations
- League: NBA

Personal information
- Born: January 12, 1960 (age 66) Paris, France
- Listed height: 6 ft 8 in (2.03 m)
- Listed weight: 230 lb (104 kg)

Career information
- High school: Washington (Washington, North Carolina)
- College: Georgia (1979–1982)
- NBA draft: 1982: 1st round, 3rd overall pick
- Drafted by: Utah Jazz
- Playing career: 1982–1999
- Position: Small forward
- Number: 21, 12

Career history
- 1982–1994: Atlanta Hawks
- 1994: Los Angeles Clippers
- 1994–1995: Boston Celtics
- 1995–1996: Panathinaikos
- 1996–1997: San Antonio Spurs
- 1997–1998: Fortitudo Bologna
- 1999: Orlando Magic

Career highlights
- 9× NBA All Star (1986–1994); All-NBA First Team (1986); 4× All-NBA Second Team (1987, 1988, 1991, 1993); 2× All-NBA Third Team (1989, 1994); NBA All-Rookie First Team (1983); NBA scoring champion (1986); 2× NBA Slam Dunk Contest champion (1985, 1990); NBA 75th Anniversary Team; No. 21 retired by Atlanta Hawks; EuroLeague champion (1996); EuroLeague Final Four MVP (1996); Greek League All-Star (1996 I); Greek All-Star Game MVP (1996 I); Greek Cup winner (1996); Greek Cup Finals Top Scorer (1996); Greek Cup Finals MVP (1996); Greek League Hall of Fame (2022); Italian League All-Star (1997); Italian Cup winner (1998); Second-team All-American – NABC, UPI (1982); Third-team All-American – AP (1982); 2× First-team All-SEC (1981, 1982); SEC tournament MVP (1981); McDonald's All-American (1979); First-team Parade All-American (1979)

Career NBA statistics
- Points: 26,668 (24.8 ppg)
- Rebounds: 7,167 (6.7 rpg)
- Assists: 2,677 (2.5 apg)
- Stats at NBA.com
- Stats at Basketball Reference
- Basketball Hall of Fame
- Collegiate Basketball Hall of Fame
Medals
Men's basketball
Representing the United States
FIBA World Cup
Gold medal – first place	1994 Toronto	National team

Jacques Dominique Wilkins (born January 12, 1960) is an American former professional basketball player who primarily played for the Atlanta Hawks of the National Basketball Association (NBA). Wilkins is a nine-time NBA All-Star, a seven-time All-NBA Team member and is widely viewed as one of the most acrobatic slam dunkers in NBA history, earning the nickname "the Human Highlight Film". In October 2021, he was honored as one of the league's greatest players of all time by being named to the NBA 75th Anniversary Team. Wilkins is the leader in most years with the Hawks, 12 seasons, the most games played in Hawks franchise history, with 882, the most minutes played with 32,545, the most career points with 23,292, and the most points per game, with 26.4 points per game.

Wilkins led the NBA in scoring in the 1985–86 season. In 2006, Wilkins was inducted into the Naismith Memorial Basketball Hall of Fame.

In addition to his 11 seasons with the Hawks, Wilkins had short stints with the Los Angeles Clippers, the Boston Celtics, Panathinaikos of the Greek Basket League, with whom he won his first titles (the FIBA European League and the Greek Cup), Fortitudo Bologna of Lega Basket Serie A, the San Antonio Spurs, and the Orlando Magic before he retired in 1999. As a member of the U.S. men's national team, Wilkins won gold at the 1994 FIBA World Championship.

== Early life ==
Wilkins was born in Paris while his father was stationed in France as an officer in the U.S. Army. His family moved to Texas at the age of five, before relocating, settling in Baltimore, Maryland. He has a younger brother, Gerald Wilkins, who also played in the NBA, mainly for the New York Knicks. His family moved to Dallas and Baltimore before settling in Washington, North Carolina, where he attended Washington High School. He was the back-to-back MVP for the team's consecutive Class 3-A State Championships (1978–1979). Wilkins was in the "Faces in the Crowd" section of Sports Illustrated while in high school for a performance in a game vs. a higher classification school in which he scored 48 points, had 27 rebounds, 9 dunks, and 8 blocks. Wilkins then starred in the McDonald's All-American Game, the Capital Classic, the Kentucky Derby Festival Classic, and the Dapper Dan Classic all-star games. He had 16 points and 12 rebounds in the McDonald's game, 26 points in the Capital Classic, and 22 points in the Derby Classic.

== College career ==
Wilkins enrolled at the University of Georgia in 1979 with a reputation as an exciting player. He averaged 21.6 points a game over his college career and was named to the All-Southeastern Conference First Team in 1981. Likely to go as one of the very top picks of the 1982 NBA draft, he left college after his junior year.

== Professional career ==
=== Atlanta Hawks (1982–1994) ===
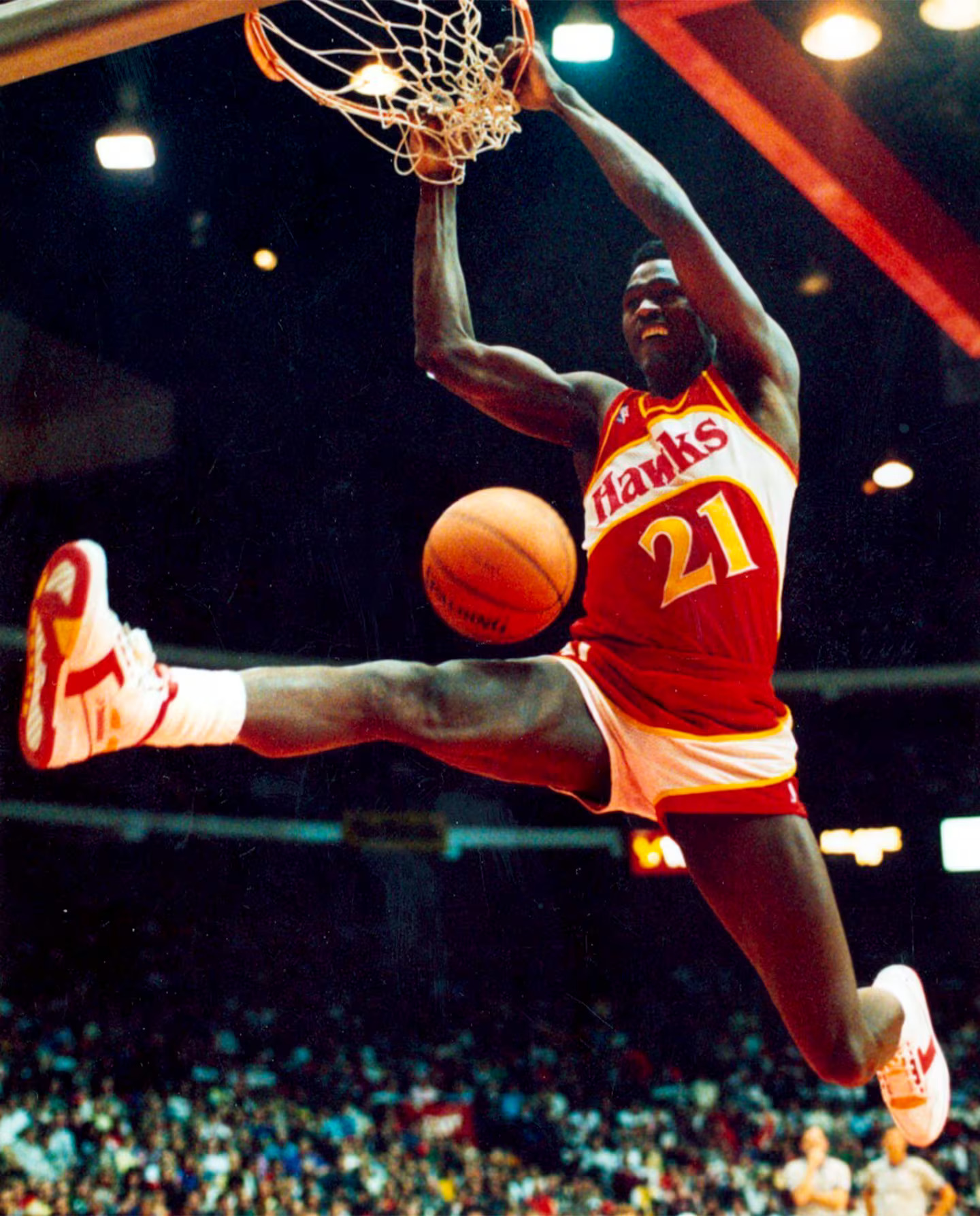
Dominique Wilkins dunks the ball in the 1988 Slam Dunk Contest

Wilkins was selected third overall (behind James Worthy and Terry Cummings) by the Utah Jazz in the 1982 NBA draft. However, Wilkins was not willing to play in Utah; the team wanted him to play power forward, while he wanted to play small forward. At the same time, the Jazz were reeling from cash flow problems. As a result, the Jazz traded Wilkins to the Atlanta Hawks several months after the draft for John Drew, Freeman Williams and $1 million in cash. The trade is now considered among the most lopsided deals in NBA history, as Drew and Williams would play a combined four seasons for the Jazz.

Wilkins averaged more than 25 points per game for ten consecutive seasons, and captured a scoring title in 1985–86 with an average of 30.3 points per game.

Wilkins was instrumental in the Hawks' prominence in the 1980s, when the club recorded four consecutive 50-win seasons during the decade. As Wilkins entered his thirties and the Hawks needed more of an all-around contribution from their star, Wilkins averaged 9.0 rebounds and 3.0 assists during the 1990–91 season.

A nine-time NBA All-Star and the winner of two NBA slam dunk contests, Wilkins registered 26,668 points and 7,169 rebounds in his NBA career. As of 2024, he ranks 17th on the NBA scoring list.

Wilkins's nickname was "The Human Highlight Film" for his athletic ability and highlight reel dunks. His trademark dunk was a powerful one- or two-handed windmill dunks he used to capture the slam dunk contest titles in 1985 and 1990. As a basketball player, he was known as an acrobatic scorer, somewhat of a gunner, though an outstanding finisher and one of the greatest dunkers in NBA history.

His #21 jersey was retired by the Hawks on January 13, 2001. He is one of five players whose jerseys have been retired by the Hawks.

==== Early years (1982–1987) ====
Wilkins notched his first Slam-Dunk Championship at the NBA All-Star Weekend in Indianapolis during the 1984–85 season. He went on to finish the season with a 27.4 scoring average, good for sixth in the NBA. He ranked second on the Hawks in rebounding (6.9 rpg) and steals (135). For the first of two straight seasons, he led the NBA in field-goal attempts, with 1,891. After going 0-for-11 from the three-point line the previous season, Wilkins made 25 of 81 three-point shots in 1984–85. He also shot better than 80 percent from the free throw line for the first of 10 consecutive seasons. Despite Wilkins's efforts, Atlanta finished 34–48 and failed to reach the playoffs.

Wilkins exploded into the NBA's elite circle in 1985–86, winning the league scoring title with an average of 30.3 points per game. He was an NBA All-Star for the first time and was voted to the All-NBA First Team at the end of the season. He failed in his bid to repeat as NBA Slam-Dunk champion, his competition coming from an unlikely source. The Hawks had signed 5-foot-7 Anthony "Spud" Webb as a free agent prior to the season, and Webb dazzled the All-Star Saturday crowd in Dallas by soaring more than 4 feet (1.2 m) to the basket on each of his dunk attempts. Atlanta turned its fortunes around in dramatic fashion, winning 16 more games in the 1985–86 season to finish 50–32 for the year. Wilkins scored 57 points in one game and ranked among the Hawks' leaders in rebounding (7.9 rpg), steals (138), and free-throw percentage (.818). Atlanta beat the Detroit Pistons in four games in the first round of the playoffs, but the Hawks could not get past the eventual NBA-champion Boston Celtics, losing four games to one in the Eastern Conference semifinals. Wilkins averaged 28.6 points in the nine playoff games.

After playing as a reserve the previous year, Wilkins became the first Atlanta Hawks player to start in an NBA All-Star Game since Eddie Johnson in 1981. Wilkins finished the year second in the league in scoring (29.0 ppg) to Michael Jordan's 37.1 points per game. He scored the 10,000th point of his career against the Chicago Bulls on April 16 and was named to the All-NBA Second Team at the season's end. Atlanta went into the season with high expectations after a 50–32 mark the previous year, and the Hawks totaled a franchise-record 57 victories. Doc Rivers, Kevin Willis, Tree Rollins, and Mike McGee contributed as the club made it through the first round of the NBA playoffs before losing in the Eastern Conference semifinals to the Detroit Pistons. Wilkins averaged 26.8 points during the postseason, the second of six straight playoffs in which he would average at least 20 points.

==== Late 1980s (1987–1990) ====
In the 1987–88 season, Wilkins posted the highest scoring average of his career and finished second to Jordan in the NBA scoring race. He averaged 30.7 points for the Hawks, but Jordan bested him at 35.0. Jordan also defeated Wilkins for the Slam Dunk Championship at the NBA All-Star Weekend in Chicago. Wilkins earned a berth on the All-NBA Second Team and became the first Hawks player to be named NBA Player of the Week three times in a season. In his third straight All-Star Game appearance, Wilkins scored 29 points on 12-of-22 shooting, leading the East squad to a 138–133 victory.

Atlanta (50–32) won at least 50 games for the third straight season and advanced to the 1988 Eastern Conference Semifinals before losing to the Boston Celtics in seven games. In Game 7 on May 22, Wilkins and Larry Bird carried their respective teams to a thrilling finish, trading bucket for bucket in the fourth quarter until Boston won with a 118–116 victory. Wilkins finished with 47 points and Bird had 34-with 20 of his points tallied in the fourth quarter. "The basket was like a well," remembered Wilkins. "I couldn't miss. He couldn't miss. And it went down to the last shot of the game. Who was going to make the last shot? That's the greatest game I've ever played in or seen played. It was two guys who just did not want to lose."

During the 1989 season with the Hawks, Wilkins's scoring average dropped slightly to 26.2, good for seventh in the league, but he was an All-Star for the fourth straight year. He shot a career-best .844 from the free-throw line and ranked second on the Hawks with 117 steals. Basketball writers selected him to the All-NBA Third Team at season's end. The Hawks added Reggie Theus and Moses Malone to the team in 1988–89. Malone averaged 20.2 points and finished fourth in the league with his 11.8 rebounding average. Theus averaged 15.8 points. Without 7-foot (2.1 m) Kevin Willis, however, who missed the entire season with a fractured left foot, Atlanta lost to the Milwaukee Bucks in the first round. Wilkins averaged 27.2 points in the playoffs.

Wilkins returned to dunking prominence in 1989–90 by edging out the Sacramento Kings' Kenny Smith for his second NBA Slam-Dunk championship. He averaged 26.7 points to finish fifth in the NBA scoring race. He led the Hawks in steals for the first time since 1985–86, finishing with 126. His .484 field-goal percentage was the best since his rookie season, and for the sixth straight year he did not foul out of a game. Nonetheless, Atlanta struggled to a 41–41 record in Mike Fratello's last season as head coach, failing to make the playoffs for only the second time in Wilkins's career.

==== Final years in Atlanta (1990–1994) ====
Wilkins averaged a career-high 9.0 rebounds in 1990–91, leading the Hawks in that category for the first time in his nine NBA seasons. He also led the team in scoring for the eighth straight year, finishing at 25.9 points per game—seventh best in the NBA. He registered a career-high 265 assists while developing a three-point shot he would use more and more in the later stages of his career. He hit 85-of-249 from long range for a .341 percentage, by far his most prolific three-point numbers to date. Wilkins made his sixth All-Star Game appearance, scoring 12 points in the East's 116–114 victory over the West. He was selected to the All-NBA Second Team for the third time in his career. Atlanta returned to the playoffs after a year's absence, drawing the defending NBA champion Detroit Pistons in the first round. The Hawks pushed the Pistons to a fifth game, but Detroit routed Atlanta, 113–81, in Game 5. Wilkins averaged 20.8 points in the five games, but shot .372 from the field and .133 from three-point range.

In the 1991–92 season, Wilkins ruptured his Achilles tendon against the Philadelphia 76ers on January 28, 1992. He underwent surgery on January 30. He also scored the 20,000th point of his career, becoming only the 16th player at the time to reach that plateau. On the day of the injury, Wilkins was named a reserve on the Eastern Conference All-Star Team. His 28.1 scoring average was his highest in five years, and the 52 points he scored in a double-overtime game on December 7 against the New York Knicks were the most by an NBA player that season.

The following season, Wilkins recovered from his injury. He scored an average of 27.7 points per game in the first month of the season. On December 8, he set an NBA record of free throws made in a game without a miss, hitting 23 free throws against the Chicago Bulls. He then suffered a setback when he fractured the ring finger on his right hand on December 15, sitting out the next 11 games. He returned to rack up 29.4 points per game on .487 shooting in January, then added 31.5 points per game on .519 shooting in February. By the end of the season, his scoring average was up to 29.9, second in the league behind Michael Jordan's 32.6. When Wilkins scored his 31st point in a February 2 game against the Seattle SuperSonics, he broke Bob Pettit's franchise scoring record of 20,880 points. He had developed into a full-fledged three-point threat, hitting 120 of 316 attempts from long range to shatter his previous career bests. He was later selected to the All-NBA Second Team. The Chicago Bulls swept the Hawks in the first round of the playoffs 3–0.

=== Los Angeles Clippers (1994) ===
Wilkins showed no signs of fading in his 12th NBA season, even after a tumultuous midseason trade. After 11½ years with the Atlanta Hawks, Wilkins was traded to the Los Angeles Clippers on February 24 in exchange for Danny Manning. This is still the only time in NBA history a team in first place in their conference traded its leading scorer at the trade deadline. Prior to the trade Wilkins averaged 24.4 points, 6.2 rebounds, and 2.3 assists for Atlanta, leading the club to a 36–16 record. At midseason he appeared in his eighth NBA All-Star Game. Hawks management and new coach Lenny Wilkens claimed Manning and his skills would help the team more during the stretch run, and they reportedly had thought about doing the trade as early as 1993. Wilkins contended that the trade was made due to his impending free agency (incidentally, Manning was also to be a free agent after the season ended).

The top-seeded Hawks lost in the conference semifinals to the Indiana Pacers and Manning ended up not signing with the Hawks anyway. Wilkins left Atlanta as the team's all-time leading scorer with 23,292 points. In his final 25 games of the season Wilkins averaged 29.1 points and 7.0 rebounds. On March 25, he returned to Atlanta in a Clippers uniform and tallied 36 points and 10 rebounds against his former team. Overall, Wilkins's 26.0 scoring average ranked fourth in the NBA. He concluded the season with 24,019 career points, placing ninth on the NBA's all-time list.

Years later, Wilkins and teammate Ron Harper claimed that in the final game of the season, team owner Donald Sterling told the coaching staff to tell the players to go easy in their game against the San Antonio Spurs due to David Robinson being in a tight race for the scoring title; Robinson scored 71 points that night to win the scoring title over Shaquille O'Neal.

=== Boston Celtics (1994–1995) ===
Wilkins became a free agent after the 1993–94 season and signed with the Boston Celtics. Shortly after the signing, he helped Dream Team II to a gold medal at the 1994 World Championship of Basketball. Wilkins wore the number 12 with the Celtics, a reverse of his previous number, 21, which the Celtics had retired in honor of Bill Sharman. In his only season with the Celtics, the team reached the playoffs but were eliminated in the first round by the Orlando Magic in four games. Wilkins averaged 19.0 points for the series. He also scored the final points by a Celtics player at the original Boston Garden before its closure.

=== Panathinaikos (1995–1996) ===
In August 1995, Pavlos and Thanasis Giannakopoulos, presidents of Panathinaikos, asked "who is the best player worldwide right now", Dominique Wilkins was the answer and after that the well known phrase of Pavlos Giannakopoulos stayed in European Basketball history "Bring him yesterday, not now, yesterday". Dominique Wilkins joined Panathinaikos of the Greek League, signing a two-year contract worth US$7 million that meant a US$3.5 million net sum per year in salary, at the time the richest deal for a professional basketball player outside the NBA. Despite Wilkins having two more years remaining on his contract with the Celtics, the Athens club, hungry for Euroleague success, stepped in by taking advantage of the said contract having a buyout clause. Arriving in Athens on 1 September 1995, Wilkins was greeted by 5,000 Panathinaikos fans at Ellinikon International Airport. The next day, 13,000 fans showed up for his first practice session. His club-provided accommodation in the city included a four-story, marbled villa of his choosing, a maid, two cars, while even his Greek taxes were paid for him by the club.

Playing on a roster alongside Stojko Vranković, Panagiotis Giannakis, Fragiskos Alvertis and Nikos Oikonomou, thirty-five-year-old Wilkins started off the season sluggishly, frequently getting targeted by the team's disciplinarian, defensively-minded head coach Božidar Maljković, even getting fined US$50,000 by the club for making too many personal trips back to the United States during the season, and complaining about being treated "like a dog" by coach Maljković.

However, Wilkins soon managed to adapt and thrive in the European game, averaging 20.1 points, 7.4 rebounds, and 1.8 assists, in 33.2 minutes per game, in 17 games played for Panathinaikos in the 1995–96 season of the EuroLeague, and helping them win the title of the EuroLeague Final Four of 1996. He particularly excelled in key EuroLeague contests such as the deciding game 3 of the EuroLeague quarterfinals best-of-3 series, versus Treviso, where he recorded 26 points and 7 rebounds, as Panathinaikos eked out a hard-fought 64–65 victory on the road, to progress to the EuroLeague Final Four. During the 1996 EuroLeague Final Four, that was held in his birthplace of Paris, Wilkins had 35 points and 8 rebounds in the semifinal against CSKA, and a double-double, with 16 points and 10 rebounds against Barcelona in the final. His performances earned him the Final Four MVP award. He also won the Greek Cup with Panathinaikos, and was named the Cup Final MVP.

Wilkins, however, failed to lead Panathinaikos to the 1995–96 Greek League national championship, as they lost the Greek League Finals to their arch-rivals, Olympiacos, 3 games to 2. Controversially, Wilkins did not play in the deciding game 5 of the finals series, claiming injury—an assertion disputed by the team. Panathinaikos ended up losing the deciding game. On 19 June 1996, following the disappointing end of the Greek League season, Wilkins and his agent were reportedly notified by the club that the player's contract would be terminated early, after only one season. On 27 June 1996, three days before the team would have had to pay a $1.75-million advance on his 1996–97 salary of $3.5 million, Wilkins and his agent Steve A. Kauffman had a lawsuit filed against them by Panathinaikos in a Massachusetts court, asking that Wilkins and his agent be barred from access to US$4 million in letters of credit granted earlier as part of the deal Wilkins had signed with the club the previous summer. The suit further cites four examples of Wilkins leaving the team without permission to attend to injuries or personal matters, including the one three days before the fifth and decisive game of the Greek Basketball Championships described in the lawsuit as "Wilkins deserting the team and creating confusion on the part of his teammates". In the Greek League, he averaged 21.0 points, 8.0 rebounds, and 1.7 assists and 32.0 minutes per game in 30 games played.

=== San Antonio Spurs (1996–1997) ===
Wilkins returned to the NBA before the 1996–97 season, signing a contract as a free agent with the San Antonio Spurs, to solidify their bench scoring. Wilkins led the team with an average of 18.2 points per game in 1996–97. He would be the last Spur to wear #21 before Tim Duncan who joined the team in the following season and Wilkins also became one of the first players to play under Gregg Popovich who made his head coaching debut with the team.

=== Fortitudo Bologna (1997–1998) ===
However, after one season, Wilkins once again went overseas, this time signing a one-year contract worth more than $1.5 million with Teamsystem Bologna of the Italian League, for the 1997–98 season. With Teamsystem, he averaged 17.8 points, 7.3 rebounds, and 1.7 assists, in 33.5 minutes per game, in 34 games played in the Italian League. He also averaged 17.9 points, 7.0 rebounds, and 1.7 assists, in 33.8 minutes per game, in 20 games played in the FIBA EuroLeague 1997–98 season, but he failed to lead his team to the Euroleague Final Four.

=== Orlando Magic (1999) ===
Wilkins returned to play his last season in the NBA, during the 1998–99 campaign, alongside his brother Gerald Wilkins, with the Orlando Magic. In 27 games, he averaged 5.0 points per game and 2.6 rebounds per game. This move on the Magic reunited Wilkins with Tree Rollins who last played with Wilkins during the 1987-88 Atlanta Hawks season. Rollins would be in the assistant coach role for the Magic.

=== Slam dunk contests ===
Wilkins participated in five slam dunk contests, winning two. His first was in 1984, in Denver. Wilkins finished third, behind Larry Nance and Julius Erving. In 1985, in Indianapolis, he beat Michael Jordan in the finals. In Dallas in 1986, a Jordan-Wilkins rematch was put on hold, since Jordan was injured. Wilkins reached the finals where he was defeated by his 5'6" teammate, Spud Webb.

The 1988 Slam Dunk Contest featured a rematch between Wilkins and Jordan. Jordan won in the final, beating Wilkins by two points. Wilkins's first two dunks of the finals earned scores of 50 from judges. On his third and final attempt, Wilkins completed a thunderous windmill dunk from the left side. Soaring high above the floor, Wilkins's head nearly hit the rim. Wilkins received a standing ovation from players and fans in attendance, but was awarded a low score of 45. The judges opened the door for Jordan to win the Chicago-based event with a score of only 48. Jordan closed out the event with 50-point dunk, taking perhaps the contest's most controversial crown.

In 1990 Wilkins made his final appearance in the Slam Dunk Contest, going up against new promising stars such as Kenny Smith, Scottie Pippen and Kenny Walker (the 1989 champion). He defeated Kenny Smith of the Sacramento Kings in the final round.

== Post-playing career ==
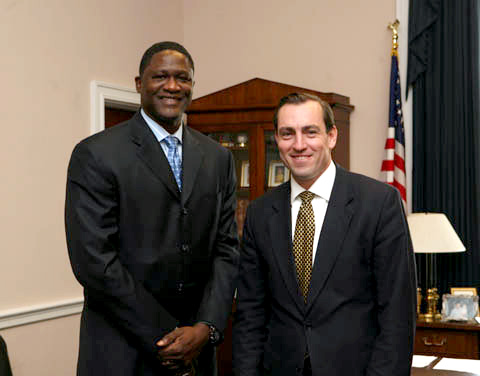
Wilkins, who has a family history of diabetes, met with New York congressman Vito Fossella in 2008 to discuss the escalating crisis of the disease in the United States

Since 2004, Wilkins has served as the Hawks' Vice President of Basketball. He works in a variety of management functions within the franchise's basketball and business areas. Wilkins is responsible for advising the Hawks' senior management team on basketball-related issues and is a goodwill ambassador for the community. Wilkins also serves as a color analyst for Hawks games on Bally Sports, pairing with long-time play-by-play announcer Bob Rathbun.

Wilkins was a judge in the 2008 NHL All-Star Game Breakaway Challenge, which was held in Atlanta.

In 2009 Wilkins participated in the McDonald's All-Star Celebrity Game during NBA All-Star Weekend and in the 2009 NBA Asia Challenge against a team of Philippine Basketball Association All-Stars. He led all scorers with 28 points in 20 minutes of play.

In 2010 Wilkins signed an agreement to partner with fitness company 24 Hour Fitness to develop the Dominique Wilkins Basketball Academy. The academy conducted private training, camps, and clinics at the 24 Hour facility in Pearl City, Hawaii. In late 2010, Wilkins starred with Verne Troyer in the TitleMax "short on cash?" television commercial campaign.

Recently Wilkins released the first of his private label wines under the Wilkins Private Reserve label. He took an interest in fine wines while playing professionally in Italy at the end of his career and owning a private label was one of his long-term goals.

In March 2014 Wilkins, whose father and grandfather both died of diabetic complications, filmed a commercial for Novo's Victoza citing their commitment to raising awareness of diabetes in the urban community, with an emphasis on children's nutrition.

On March 6, 2015, the Atlanta Hawks organization unveiled a statue of Wilkins that sits in front of then-titled Philips Arena, and now State Farm Arena.

== Personal life ==
Wilkins's stepson, Isaiah Wilkins, played for the University of Virginia and was the 2018 ACC Defensive Player of the Year. Wilkins's son, Jacob Wilkins, played for the Georgia Bulldogs and currently plays for the California Golden Bears.

== Career statistics ==
Legend
GP	Games played	GS	Games started	MPG	Minutes per game
FG%	Field goal percentage	3P%	3-point field goal percentage	FT%	Free throw percentage
RPG	Rebounds per game	APG	Assists per game	SPG	Steals per game
BPG	Blocks per game	PPG	Points per game	**Bold**	Career high
*	Led the league

=== NBA ===
==== Regular season ====
Year	Team	GP	GS	MPG	FG%	3P%	FT%	RPG	APG	SPG	BPG	PPG
1982–83	Atlanta	**82***	**82***	32.9	**.493**	.182	.682	5.8	1.6	1.0	.8	17.5
1983–84	Atlanta	81	81	36.6	.479	.000	.770	7.2	1.6	1.4	**1.1**	21.6
1984–85	Atlanta	81	81	37.3	.451	.309	.806	6.9	2.5	1.7	.7	27.4
1985–86	Atlanta	78	78	**39.1**	.468	.186	.818	7.8	2.6	**1.8**	.6	30.3*
1986–87	Atlanta	79	79	37.6	.463	.292	.818	6.3	3.3	1.5	.6	29.0
1987–88	Atlanta	78	76	37.8	.464	.295	.826	6.4	2.9	1.3	.6	**30.7**
1988–89	Atlanta	80	80	37.5	.464	.276	.844	6.9	2.6	1.5	.7	26.2
1989–90	Atlanta	80	79	36.1	.484	.322	.807	6.5	2.5	1.6	.6	26.7
1990–91	Atlanta	81	81	38.0	.470	.341	.829	**9.0**	3.3	1.5	.8	25.9
1991–92	Atlanta	42	42	38.1	.464	.289	.835	7.0	**3.8**	1.2	.6	28.1
1992–93	Atlanta	71	70	37.3	.468	.380	.828	6.8	3.2	1.0	.4	29.9
1993–94	Atlanta	49	49	34.4	.432	.308	**.854**	6.2	2.3	1.3	.4	24.4
1993–94	L.A. Clippers	25	25	37.9	.453	.247	.835	7.0	2.2	1.2	.3	29.1
1994–95	Boston	77	64	31.5	.424	**.388**	.782	5.2	2.2	.8	.2	17.8
1996–97	San Antonio	63	26	30.9	.417	.293	.803	6.4	1.9	.6	.5	18.2
1998–99	Orlando	27	2	9.3	.379	.263	.690	2.6	.6	.1	.0	5.1
Career		1,074	995	35.5	.461	.319	.811	6.7	2.5	1.3	.6	24.8
All-Star		8	3	22.7	.400	.250	.737	3.8	2.1	.8	.5	15.1

==== Playoffs ====
Year	Team	GP	GS	MPG	FG%	3P%	FT%	RPG	APG	SPG	BPG	PPG
1983	Atlanta	3	3	36.3	.405	**1.000**	.857	5.0	.3	.7	.3	15.7
1984	Atlanta	5	5	34.4	.417	.000	.839	8.2	2.2	**2.4**	.2	19.2
1986	Atlanta	9	9	40.0	.433	.439	.861	6.0	2.8	1.0	.2	28.6
1987	Atlanta	9	9	40.0	.410	.415	.892	7.8	2.8	1.8	.9	26.8
1988	Atlanta	**12**	**12**	39.4	.457	.222	.768	6.4	2.8	1.3	.5	**31.2**
1989	Atlanta	5	5	**42.4**	.448	.294	.711	5.4	**3.4**	.8	**1.6**	27.2
1991	Atlanta	5	5	39.0	.372	.133	**.914**	6.4	2.6	1.8	1.0	20.8
1993	Atlanta	3	3	37.7	.427	.250	.767	5.3	3.0	1.0	.3	30.0
1995	Boston	4	4	37.5	.426	.471	.889	**10.8**	2.0	.5	.8	19.0
1999	Orlando	1	0	3.0	**.500**	.000	.000	.0	.0	.0	.0	2.0
Career		56	55	39.6	.429	.281	.824	6.7	2.6	1.3	.6	25.4

=== EuroLeague ===
Legend
GP	Games played	GS	Games started	MPG	Minutes per game
FG%	Field-goal percentage	3P%	3-point field-goal percentage	FT%	Free-throw percentage
RPG	Rebounds per game	APG	Assists per game	SPG	Steals per game
BPG	Blocks per game	PPG	Points per game	PIR	Performance index rating
**Bold**	Career high	†	Won a EuroLeague championship

Year	Team	GP	GS	MPG	FG%	3P%	FT%	RPG	APG	SPG	BPG	PPG	PIR
1995–96†	Panathinaikos	17	17	33.2	.446	**.322**	**.825**	**7.4**	**1.8**	0.5	0.0	**20.1**	—
1997–98	Fortitudo Bologna	**20**	**20**	**33.8**	**.455**	.293	.725	7.0	1.7	**1.5**	0.0	17.9	—

== Awards and honors ==
- 1985–86 NBA scoring champion (30.3 ppg)
- NBA All-Star Slam Dunk Champion: 1985, 1990.
- NBA All-Rookie Team: 1983.
- All-NBA First Team: 1986.
- All-NBA Second Team: 1987–88, 1991, 1993.
- All-NBA Third Team: 1989, 1994.
- Nine-time NBA All Star: 1986–94.
- Naismith Memorial Basketball Hall of Fame (2006).
- FIBA World Championship gold medalist: 1994
- FIBA EuroLeague Champion: 1996 (now known as EuroLeague).
- Greek Cup Winner: 1996
- Italian Cup Winner: 1998
- NBA Shooting Stars champion: 2013–2015 (Team Chris Bosh, with Swin Cash).
- NBA 75th Anniversary Team: 2021
- Greek Basket League Hall of Fame: 2022

== NBA records ==
=== Regular season ===
Free throws made in a game with no misses: 23–23, vs. Chicago Bulls, December 8, 1992

- Also holds fourth (see below)

Consecutive free throws made in a game: 23, vs. Chicago Bulls, December 8, 1992

1 of 8 players in NBA history to average at least 25 points per game for 10 consecutive seasons: 1984–85–1993–94

- Jerry West, Michael Jordan, Karl Malone, Shaquille O'Neal, Allen Iverson, LeBron James, and Kevin Durant have also achieved this.

=== Playoffs ===
Points scored in a Game 7 of a playoff series: 47, at Boston Celtics, May 22, 1988

- Game 7 of Eastern Conference Semifinals
- The Atlanta Hawks still lost the game (and series), 118–116.
- Broken by Kevin Durant in 2021

Field goal attempts, 4-game series: 114, vs. Detroit Pistons (1986)

- Also holds fourth (see below)
- Broken by Hakeem Olajuwon in 1995

=== All-Star ===
Field goal attempts, half: 16 (1988)

- Broken by Glen Rice in 1997

==== Playoffs ====
Field goals made, 4-game series: 63, vs. Detroit Pistons (1986)

Field goal attempts, 4-game series: 108, vs. Indiana Pacers (1987)

- Also held the record (see above)

== See also ==
- List of NBA career scoring leaders
- List of NBA career turnovers leaders
- List of NBA career free throw scoring leaders
- List of NBA annual scoring leaders
- List of NBA single-game playoff scoring leaders
- List of NBA franchise career scoring leaders
