= Dimitrios Giannakopoulos =

Greek businessman (born 1974)

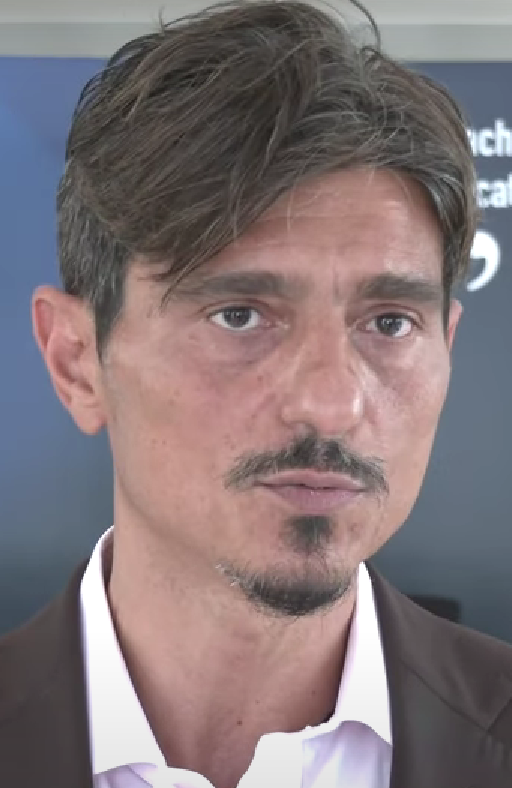
- Dimitrios Giannakopoulos in 2020.
- Born: Dimitrios Giannakopoulos; 22 June 1974 (age 51); Athens, Greece
- Occupation: Pharmaceutical industrialist
- Years active: 2012-present
- Known for: Owner of Panathinaikos BC
- Title: President & CEO, Vianex S.A.
- Predecessor: Pavlos Giannakopoulos
- Spouse: Ioanna Marosoulis
- Children: 2
- Parent: Pavlos Giannakopoulos (father)
- Relatives: Thanasis Giannakopoulos (uncle)
- Website: www.vianex.gr www.dpgmediagroup.gr

Dimitrios Pavlos Giannakopoulos (alternate spelling: Dimitris Giannacopoulos, Greek: Δημήτρης Παύλος Γιαννακόπουλος) (born on June 22, 1974, Athens) is a Greek businessman and pharmaceutical manufacturer. He is the president of the board and chief executive officer of Vianex, owner of Panathinaikos B.C. as well as owner of 50% of the company Superfoods SA, among many other activities.

== Biography ==
Dimitris Giannakopoulos was born in Athens. He is the only son of Pavlos Giannakopoulos, who was the founder of Vianex, the largest Greek pharmaceutical company.

On the side of his father, he is originally from Sellasia, Laconia.

In 2004, Giannakopoulos became the first vice president, and in January 2012 he became deputy chief executive officer of Vianex. In 2019, he was appointed president of the board of directors and chief executive officer of Vianex.

He has served as president of Panathinaikos A.O. (2018–2020).

== Business activity ==
=== Vianex ===
The involvement of the Giannakopoulos family in the field of pharmaceuticals began in 1924, with a pharmacy on Peiraios Street. The decisive step was made by Paul Giannakopoulos in 1960 with the establishment of Farmagian company, which in 1971 became an SA and was renamed into Vianex. The manufacturing activity of the company began in 1977 with the foundation of its first factory. By 1999, Vianex had acquired four modern factories in Athens and Achaia, while at Varympompi it had established its main offices and distribution centre of finished products. In 1995, the subsidiary VIAN SA was established, to distribute and market well-known over-the-counter products (OTCs), food supplements, as well as diagnostic and parapharmaceutical products.

The company employs 1242 people (as of 2020).

Giannakopoulos took the reins of the company from his father Paul in January 2012 when he also became deputy chief executive officer, in addition to being the vice chairman of the board of directors of Vianex.

The new era of the company under the leadership of Giannakopoulos was associated with increased outreach and conclusion of important agreements, be them new ones or extension of existing ones. "I handed over the reins of the largest Greek pharmaceutical industry in the country and I'm sure that one day he will also make it the largest one abroad" stated Paul Giannakopoulos in July 2013, on the occasion of the announcement of the collaboration between Vianex and Eli Lilly, for the production of the injectable antibiotic vancomycin at the facilities of Vianex and its 100% export in the Chinese market.

The 2019 turnover of Vianex Group was 301.3 million euros.

=== Superfoods ===
In 2016 Giannakopoulos Group and Papazoglou Group each acquired a 50% stake of Superfoods, a Greek company of food supplements and natural health products.

== Social profile ==
Giannakopoulos is the president of the Pavlos Giannakopoulos Foundation (Ίδρυμα Παύλος Γιαννακόπουλος) which is a charitable organisation named after his father Pavlos Giannakopoulos. This organisation financially supports students, has programs against poverty, provides funding to the healthcare industry and to environmental projects, and strives to make education more accessible and to preserve Greek culture.

Giannakopoulos has been an active political voice in the Greek Parliament representing his pharmaceutical company Vianex while also being active on the global pharmaceutical industry stage.

Giannakopoulos is also active in social media posting regularly about his team Panathinaikos B.C. and Vianex.

== Controversies ==
Giannakopoulos has often caused incidents and in his statements he has characterized himself as the "inventor of vagrancy".

In the spring of 1999, he barged into Panathinaikos' locker room after a loss in a game against Olympiakos and provoked the team's head coach Lefteris Subotic, as a result of which the team's centre Dino Radja physically accosted Giannakopoulos.

In April 2011, together with his bodyguards, he invaded the offices of the gazzetta.gr website and threatened its employees and their families. The reason was that the news website allowed the publishing of comments on its articles that he considered slanderous about him.

In 2016, in the OAKA locker room, he insulted Vassilis Spanoulis by wishing his son to die and was forced to apologize afterwards.

In January 2019 he offered €10,000 for information about an Olympiakos fan who had spat at him during a basketball game.

In June 2020, he vandalized a Panathinaikos supporter's kebab shop. In retaliation, a group of about 100 Panathinaikos supporters attacked his house with stones, paint and insults. He later resigned as president of Panathinaikos A.O..

During the COVID-19 pandemic, Giannakopoulos held a hard sceptical stance against vaccinations, claiming that his DNA identity would be altered if he received one. He had also insulted people trying to forcefully change the mind of those resisting to receive a vaccine.
