= 1989–90 Yugoslav First Basketball League =

- League: Yugoslav First Basketball League
- Sport: Basketball
- Duration: 7 October 1989 – 24 March 1990 (Regular season); April 1990 (Playoffs)

Regular season
- Season champions: (Socialist Republic of Croatia) Jugoplastika
- Top scorer: Arijan Komazec (Zadar)

Playoffs
- Finals champions: (Socialist Republic of Croatia) Jugoplastika
- Runners-up: Crvena Zvezda

Yugoslav First Basketball League seasons
- ← 1988–89 1990–91 →

The 1989–90 Yugoslav First Basketball League season was the 46th season of the Yugoslav First Basketball League, the highest professional basketball league in SFR Yugoslavia.

== Notable events ==
=== Star players going abroad before turning 28 ===
The season saw new developments in the business aspect of basketball in Yugoslavia as a result of the Yugoslav First Basketball League's basketball talent becoming interesting to rich NBA teams. With the country's still-formally-enforced strict sporting exit rules—stipulating that no player is allowed to transfer abroad before turning 28 years of age—already being bent and occasionally loosened (superstar Dražen Petrović going to Real Madrid at the age of 24 one year earlier), summer 1989 saw two more high-profile star players leaving the league way before turning 28: twenty-one-year-old Vlade Divac joining the Los Angeles Lakers and twenty-three-year-old Žarko Paspalj heading to the San Antonio Spurs.

Attracted by superior financial compensation in the NBA, the summer 1989 offseason saw yet another newly drafted young Yugoslav star player, Dino Rađa, even resort to unilaterally travelling to the United States and signing with the Boston Celtics despite having a valid contract with KK Jugoplastika; he would eventually be forced to return to Yugoslavia following a Jugoplastika-initiated legal process before U.S. courts. With NBA scouts closely following a number of other Yugoslav League young players—such as Jugoplastika's Toni Kukoč and Žan Tabak, KK Partizan's Predrag Danilović, Saša Đorđević, and Miroslav Pecarski, KK Crvena zvezda's Rastko Cvetković, KK Cibona's Franjo Arapović, KK Zadar's Stojko Vranković and Arijan Komazec, KK Olimpija's Radisav Ćurčić, etc. not to mention a slew of even younger juniors coming up such as Dejan Bodiroga and Željko Rebrača—it was becoming clear that the decades-long system of keeping players in the country until the age of 28 was about to become impossible to keep maintaining.

=== Koš magazine ===
From October 1989, the country got its first-ever basketball specific periodical publication. A magazine named Koš with Vladimir Stanković as its editor-in-chief—devoted entirely to coverage of Yugoslav basketball league, Yugoslav national teams (men's and women's), and Yugoslav players abroad—was launched by the Borba publishing company, thus further indicating the level of popularity the sport had grown to in the country. The first issue of Koš featured Lakers rookie Vlade Divac on the cover, standing in front of The Forum in Los Angeles while wearing his number 12 Lakers jersey.

=== NBA broadcasts begin on Yugoslav television ===
Furthermore, with Petrović moving to the Portland Trail Blazers—along with Divac and Paspalj joining the Lakers and Spurs, respectively—the entire Yugoslav basketball media ecosystem began to change as well. Yugoslav Radio Television (JRT), country's public broadcasting system, bought television rights to an NBA package consisting of 26 NBA games (18 regular season games and 8 playoff games) from the 1989-90 season—mostly involving Lakers, Blazers, and Spurs—for US$28,000. The US$28,000 price tag (US$67,000 in 2022) was reportedly split between JRT's two biggest television affiliates—TV Beograd and TV Zagreb—with each one paying US$14,000. Carried in Yugoslavia starting from 19 November 1989, on tape delay, the NBA broadcasts marked the first time that games from a foreign basketball league games were shown on Yugoslav television.

== Teams ==
(Socialist Republic of Serbia) SR Serbia

- Crvena Zvezda
- IMT
- Partizan
- Vojvodina
- Zorka Šabac

(Socialist Republic of Croatia) SR Croatia

- Cibona
- Jugoplastika
- Novi Zagreb
- Zadar

(Socialist Republic of Bosnia and Herzegovina) SR Bosnia and Herzegovina

- Bosna
- Sloboda Dita Tuzla

(Socialist Republic of Slovenia) SR Slovenia

- Smelt Olimpija

== Regular season ==
=== Classification ===
	Regular season ranking 1989-90	G	V	P	PF	PS	Pt	Status
1.	Jugoplastika	22	19	3	2118	1734	41	Champions
2.	Crvena Zvezda	22	17	5	2026	1961	39	Qualification for the Playoffs
3.	Zadar	22	13	9	1999	1873	35	Qualification for the Playoffs
4.	Cibona	22	13	9	2114	1968	35	Qualification for the Playoffs
5.	Vojvodina	22	12	10	1851	1851	34
6.	Bosna	22	12	10	1922	1888	34
7.	Smelt Olimpija	22	10	12	1950	1929	32
8.	Partizan	22	9	13	1872	1968	31
9.	Novi Zagreb	22	8	14	1737	1808	30	Qualification for the Playout
10.	IMT	22	7	15	1814	1976	29	Qualification for the Playout
11.	Sloboda Dita Tuzla	22	7	15	1796	1990	29	Relegated
12.	Zorka Šabac	22	5	17	1844	2008	27	Relegated

== Results ==
Home \ Away	JUG	CZV	ZAD	CIB	VOJ	BOS	OLI	PAR	ZAG	IMT	SLT	ZOR
Jugoplastika	—	123–75	90–78	109–88	102–89	94–85	108–81	106–85	84–73	103–77	89–68	104–86
Crvena Zvezda	84–101	—	91–88	95–92	93–83	97–75	115–103	81–79	87–84	110–84	107–93	75–68
Zadar	90–81	85–88	—	103–72	113–89	77–73	99–84	124–94	84–76	93–80	84–69	104–90
Cibona	86–97	96–80	98–90	—	98–85	110–112	79–82	90–80	84–77	108–84	97–82	100–97
Vojvodina	88–96	79–84	81–72	100–96	—	90–78	89–72	85–83	91–78	83–79	89–66	97–94
Bosna	62–59	93–98	98–92	81–86	86–82	—	110–99	83–98	79–80	88–78	87–80	114–88
Olimpija	67–75	113–93	93–82	86–85	85–68	76–86	—	104–94	77–84	107–81	118–98	108–89
Partizan	77–99	77–87	84–92	82–79	92–83	85–101	77–85	—	105–99	79–82	84–83	89–73
Novi Zagreb	80–109	67–80	98–90	95–96	65–74	75–74	77–71	55–59	—	68–69	79–76	92–74
IMT	81–80	101–91	79–87	83–85	79–90	80–92	86–84	93–103	82–80	—	73–76	71–75
Sloboda Dita Tuzla	68–114	89–106	77–94	77–87	69–66	88–87	94–92	103–92	92–67	84–87	—	92–87
Zorka Šabac	76–95	88–109	88–78	91–100	71–80	76–78	70–63	81–84	79–88	109–105	94–82	—

Source: Koš magazin
Legend: Blue = home team win; Red = away team win.
Matches with lighter background shading were decided after overtime.

== Playoff ==
Semifinals
1	Jugoplastika	2
4	Cibona	1
2	Crvena Zvezda	2
3	Zadar	1

Finals
1	Jugoplastika	3
2	Crvena Zvezda	1

SEMIFINALS

Jugoplastika-Cibona 94-82, 69-80, 103-90

Crvena zvezda-Zadar 93-89, 90-108, 97-88

FINALS

Jugoplastika-Crvena zvezda 98-70, 67-69, 93-63, 113-91

GROUP KORAC

Partizan-Sibenka 87-80, 71-85, 97-93

Olimpija-Buducnost 105-80, 121-93

Bosna-Olimpija 107-110, 86-88

Vojvodina-Partizan 75-68, 76-82, 76-73

The winning roster of Jugoplastika:

- (Socialist Federal Republic of Yugoslavia) Zoran Sretenović
- (Socialist Federal Republic of Yugoslavia) Velimir Perasović
- (Socialist Federal Republic of Yugoslavia) Toni Kukoč
- (Socialist Federal Republic of Yugoslavia) Petar Naumoski
- (Socialist Federal Republic of Yugoslavia) Zoran Savić
- (Socialist Federal Republic of Yugoslavia) Goran Sobin
- (Socialist Federal Republic of Yugoslavia) Velibor Radović
- (Socialist Federal Republic of Yugoslavia) Aramis Naglić
- (Socialist Federal Republic of Yugoslavia) Žan Tabak
- (Socialist Federal Republic of Yugoslavia) Duško Ivanović
- (Socialist Federal Republic of Yugoslavia) Dino Rađa
- (Socialist Federal Republic of Yugoslavia) Paško Tomić
- (Socialist Federal Republic of Yugoslavia) Teo Čizmić
- (Socialist Federal Republic of Yugoslavia) Luka Pavićević

Coach: (Socialist Federal Republic of Yugoslavia) Božidar Maljković

== Scoring leaders ==
1. Arijan Komazec (Zadar) - ___ points (31.5ppg)

== Play-out ==
Six teams competed to qualify for the 1990-91 Yugoslav basketball league (9th-placed IMT and 10th-placed Novi Zagreb from the A league; second-placed Rabotnički and third-placed Radnički from the IB league (East division), second-placed Spartak Subotica and third-placed Čelik Zenica from the IB league (West division).

=== Qualifying round ===
Rabotnički - Čelik 71-68, 72-82, 71-72

Spartak Subotica - Radnički Belgrade 85-82, 69-106, 72-67

=== Final round ===
		W	L	PF	PS	Pt	Status
1	IMT	5	1	485	481	11	Qualification for 1990-91 Yugoslav first basketball league
2	Čelik Zenica	3	3	444	433	9	Qualification for 1990-91 Yugoslav first basketball league
3	Novi Zagreb	3	3	470	461	9	
4	Spartak Subotica	1	5	454	508	7	

IMT - Spartak 94-85, Novi Zagreb- Čelik 72-69,

Spartak - Novi Zagreb 93-87, Čelik - IMT 57-67,

Novi Zagreb - IMT 81-69, Spartak- Čelik 55-62,

Spartak - IMT 68-82, Čelik - Novi Zagreb 78-65,

IMT - Čelik 91-80, Novi Zagreb - Spartak 85-70,

IMT - Novi Zagreb 82-80, Čelik - Spartak 98-83.

== Qualification in 1990-91 season European competitions ==
FIBA European Champions Cup

- Jugoplastika (champions)

FIBA Cup Winners' Cup

- Crvena Zvezda (Cup finalist)

FIBA Korać Cup

- Zadar (3rd)
- Cibona (4th)
- Vojvodina (playoffs)
- Smelt Olimpija (playoffs)

== Basketball Cup ==
=== Bracket ===
Eightfinals
Zadar	93
MZT Skopje	68
Jugoplastika	80
Vojvodina	73
Bosna	104
Vlaznimi	66
Prvi partizan	68
Olimpija	82
Crvena zvezda	84
Čelik	76
IMT	89
OKK Beograd	76
Cibona	93
Budućnost	77
Partizan	85
Šibenka	70

Quarterfinals
Zadar	75
Jugoplastika	90
Bosna	81
Olimpija	87
Crvena zvezda	84
IMT	73
Cibona	110
Partizan	73

Semifinals
Jugoplastika	84
Olimpija	74
Crvena zvezda	76
Cibona	73

Finals
Jugoplastika	79
Crvena zvezda	77
