= Cholet Basket =

French basketball team

Cholet
- Leagues: LNB Élite; Champions League
- Founded: 1975; 51 years ago
- History: Cholet Basket (1975–present)
- Arena: La Meilleraie
- Capacity: 5,191
- Location: Cholet, France
- Team colors: Red and white
- President: Jerome Merignac
- Vice-president: Alain Lafat
- Head coach: Fabrice Lefrançois
- Championships: 1 French Championship; 2 French Cup; 1 La Semaine des As Cup
- Retired numbers: 2 (4, 10)
- Website: cholet-basket.com
Home	Away	Third

Cholet Basket is a professional basketball club based in Cholet, France. The club plays in the LNB Élite, the top division. Established in 1975, Cholet won its first French championship in the 2009–10 season. In 1998 and 1999, Cholet won the French Cup. Their home arena is La Meilleraie.

== History ==
=== Establishment ===
The team debuted in the 1st division in the 1987–88 season and managed to get to the premier league in 12 years. The team was able to sustain itself in the league, and was consistently in the top 10 teams, having a highly successful youth system. This youth system has allowed the club to produce professional players season after season. After winning the National Cup in 1999, Cholet got automatically qualified for its first participation to the Euroleague (3 victories – 13 defeats). During the 2004–05 season 10 of the 12 players in the first team derived from the youth system. Some of the players who had their debut in the team are Antoine Rigaudeau, Jim Bilba and Mickaël Gelabale.

During the 2008–2009 season, Cholet was defeated by Virtus Bologna in the EuroChallenge's Final (75–77).

In 2010, Cholet finished 1st of the 2009–2010 Pro A League regular season and won the championship after defeating Le Mans in the Play-Offs Final (81–65). Thanks to its national champion title, Cholet is automatically qualified for the 2010–2011 Euroleague season. Cholet was eliminated during the first round (4 victories – 6 defeats) of the 2010–2011 Euroleague after defeating prestigious (and at the time unbeaten) Fenerbahçe Ülker (82–78).

In 2011, Cholet, defending its title finished 1st again of the 2011-12 Pro A League regular season and was only defeated during the finals by SLUC Nancy (74-76).

== Logos ==
Evolution of the Logo

–2012

2012–2019

2019–present

== Youth academy ==
Cholet Basket is intensively focusing on its Youth Academy to provide players to its professional squad. During the 2004–05 season, 10 of the 12 players of the Pro squad have progressed through the club Youth Academy. It is also one of the only seven European clubs to have provided two players to the same NBA draft in 2009, with Rodrigues Beaubois and Nando De Colo beside Real Madrid (2005), Joventut Badalona (2009), Fenerbahçe Ülker (2008), KK Partizan (2002) ,Pau-Ortez (2003) and most recently, Ratiopharm Ulm (2024 and 2025).

Notable Players that have progressed through the Cholet Youth Academy (Espoirs)

- (France) Antoine Rigaudeau
- (France) Jim Bilba
- (France) David Gautier
- (France) Aymeric Jeanneau
- (France) Charles Kahudi
- (France) Cédric Ferchaud
- (France) Claude Marquis
- (France) Mickaël Gelabale
- (France) Rudy Gobert
- (France) Nando de Colo
- (France) Rodrigue Beaubois
- (France) Kévin Séraphin
- (France) Killian Hayes
- (France) Tidjane Salaün

== Players ==
=== Retired numbers ===
Cholet Basket retired numbers
No.	Nat.	Player	Position	Tenure
4	(France)	Antoine Rigaudeau	PG	1987–1995
10	(France)	Jim Bilba	PF	1988–1992, 2002–2007

=== Current roster ===
Note: Flags indicate national team eligibility at FIBA-sanctioned events. Players may hold other non-FIBA nationalities not displayed.

Cholet Basket roster
Players
Coaches

Pos.	No.	Nat.	Name	Ht.	Age
SG	0	(France)	Cazalon, Malcolm	1.98 m (6 ft 6 in)	25 – 27 August 2001
G	2	(France)	Fall, Amadou	1.93 m (6 ft 4 in)	17 – 27 January 2009
G	3	(United States)	Lewis, JeQuan	1.85 m (6 ft 1 in)	32 – 7 September 1994
SG	5	(United States)	Locke, Noah	1.91 m (6 ft 3 in)	27 – 10 May 1999
F	6	(France)	Diawara, Digue	2.06 m (6 ft 9 in)	28 – 3 October 1998
C	7	(Bosnia and Herzegovina)	Halilović, Miralem	2.08 m (6 ft 10 in)	35 – 22 July 1991
F/C	13	(United States)	Williams, Johnathan	2.06 m (6 ft 9 in)	31 – 22 May 1995
C	18	(United States)	Kidd, Lynn	2.10 m (6 ft 11 in)	24 – 17 December 2001
G/F	21	(United States)	Snell, Tony	1.98 m (6 ft 6 in)	35 – 10 November 1991
PF	22	(Madagascar)	Raharimanantoanina, Sitraka	2.06 m (6 ft 9 in)	25 – 20 January 2001
PG	23	(United States)	West, Jarrod	1.83 m (6 ft 0 in)	27 – 29 March 1999
F	49	(France)	Lobry-Pathouot, Nils	2.02 m (6 ft 8 in)	19 – 29 January 2007
G	79	(France)	Towo-Nansi, Aaron	1.78 m (5 ft 10 in)	17 – 4 March 2009
PF	93	(France)	Diarra, Mohamed	2.08 m (6 ft 10 in)	26 – 1 January 2000

Head coach

- (France) Fabrice Lefrançois

Assistant coach(es)

- (France) Benjamin Villeger
- (France) Gaëtan Cherbonnier
- (France) Gaëtan Douet

Legend

- (C) Team captain
- Injured

- Roster
Updated: October 25, 2026

=== FIBA Hall of Famers ===
Cholet Basket Hall of Famers
Players
No.	Nat.	Name	Position	Tenure	Inducted
4	(France)	Antoine Rigaudeau	G	1987–95	2015

== Season by season ==
Season	Tier	League	Pos.	French Cup	Leaders Cup	European competitions	
2006–07	1	Pro A	7th				
2007–08	1	Pro A	8th	Runner-up	Champion	3 FIBA EuroCup	GS
2008–09	1	Pro A	9th	Round of 16		2 Eurocup	Q
2008–09	1	Pro A	9th	Round of 16		3 EuroChallenge	RU
2009–10	1	Pro A	1st	Round of 32	Quarterfinalist	2 Eurocup	RS
2010–11	1	Pro A	2nd	Round of 16	Quarterfinalist	1 Euroleague	RS
2011–12	1	Pro A	4th	Semifinalist	Quarterfinalist	1 Euroleague	QR1
2011–12	1	Pro A	4th	Semifinalist	Quarterfinalist	2 Eurocup	RS
2012–13	1	Pro A	10th	Round of 16		2 Eurocup	RS
2013–14	1	Pro A	13th	Round of 16		3 EuroChallenge	L16
2014–15	1	Pro A	14th	Round of 16			
2015–16	1	Pro A	13th	Round of 32			
2016–17	1	Pro A	11th	Round of 16			
2017–18	1	Pro A	15th				
2018–19	1	Pro A	15th				
2019–20	1	Pro A	6th*				
2020–21	1	Pro A	14th			3 Champions League	RS
2021–22	1	Pro A	8th				
2022–23	1	Pro A	7th			4 Europe Cup	RU
2023–24	1	Pro A	7th	Round of 16		3 Champions League	R16
2024–25	1	Pro A	4th	Quarterfinalist		3 Champions League	QR
2024–25	1	Pro A	4th	Quarterfinalist		4 FIBA Europe Cup	SF

== Achievements ==
- French Championship Pro A: 2010
- La Semaine des As Cup: 2008
- French Cup: 1998, 1999
- Match des Champions (French Pro A Champion vs French Cup winner): 2010
- Finalist of Pro A: 1988, 2011
- French Cup Finalist: 2005, 2008
- Finalist of the Tournoi des As Cup: 1988, 1989, 1990 and 1993.
- Champion of Division 2 (now Pro B): 1986

== Notable players ==
Note: Flags indicate national team eligibility at FIBA-sanctioned events. Players may hold other non-FIBA nationalities not displayed.

Criteria

To appear in this section a player must have either:

- Set a club record or won an individual award while at the club
- Played at least one official international match for their national team at any time
- Played at least one official NBA match at any time.

France

- (France) fr:Valéry Demory
- (France) Bruno Coqueran
- (France) Stéphane Ostrowski
- (France) Patrick Cham
- (France) Antoine Rigaudeau
- (France) Jim Bilba
- (France) David Albert
- (France) fr:David Gautier
- (France) fr:Éric Micoud
- (France) Aymeric Jeanneau
- (France) Fabien Dubos
- (France) fr:Cédric Ferchaud
- (France) fr:Claude Marquis
- (France) Mickaël Gelabale
- (France) Cyril Akpomedah
- (France) Steed Tchicamboud
- (France) Nando de Colo
- (France) Rodrigue Beaubois
- (France) Fabien Causeur
- (France) Rudy Gobert
- (France) Killian Hayes
- (France) Charles Kahudi
- (France) Tidjane Salaün

United States

- (United States) fr:Jimmal Ball
- (United States) Scooter Barry
- (United States) Corey Crowder
- (United States) fr:Paul Fortier
- (United States) fr:DeRon Hayes
- (United States) Mike Jones
- (United States) Micheal Ray Richardson
- (United States) James Blackwell
- (United States) fr:Graylin Warner
- (United States) K'Zell Wesson
- (United States) Terrell Lyday
- (United States) Lamayn Wilson
- (United States) Taj Gray
- (United States) John Linehan
- (United States) London Perrantes
- (United States) Antywane Robinson
- (United States) Randal Falker
- (United States) fr:Tony Stanley
- (United States) Chandler Parsons
- (United States) Michael Wright

Other countries

- Junior Etou
- (Dominican Republic) Samuel Mejia
- (England) John Amaechi
- (England) Tony Dorsey
- (Lithuania) Artūras Karnišovas
- (Lithuania) Arvydas Eitutavičius
- (South Korea) / (United States) Moon Tae-jong

== Head coaches ==
- 1970s: (Romania) Dragoş Nosievici
- 1987–89: (France) Jean Galle
- 1989–91: (France) Jean-Paul Rebatet
- 1991–95: (France) Laurent Buffard
- 1995–96: (France) Alain Thinet (7 games)
  (France) Eric Girard (1 game)
  (France) Jean Galle
- 1996–2001: (France) Eric Girard
- 2001–02: (Montenegro) (France) Savo Vucević
- 2002–03: (France) Jean-François Martin
- 2003–04: (Turkey) Erman Kunter
- 2006–12: (Turkey) Erman Kunter
- 2012–14: (France) Jean-Manuel Sousa
- 2014–15: (France) Laurent Buffard
- 2015–16: (France) Jérôme Navier
- 2016–18: (France) Philippe Hervé
- 2018: (France) Régis Boissié
- 2018–21: (Turkey) (France) Erman Kunter
- 2021–24: (France) Laurent Vila
- 2024–present: (France) Fabrice Lefrançois
