= Vianex S.A. =

Greek pharmaceutical company

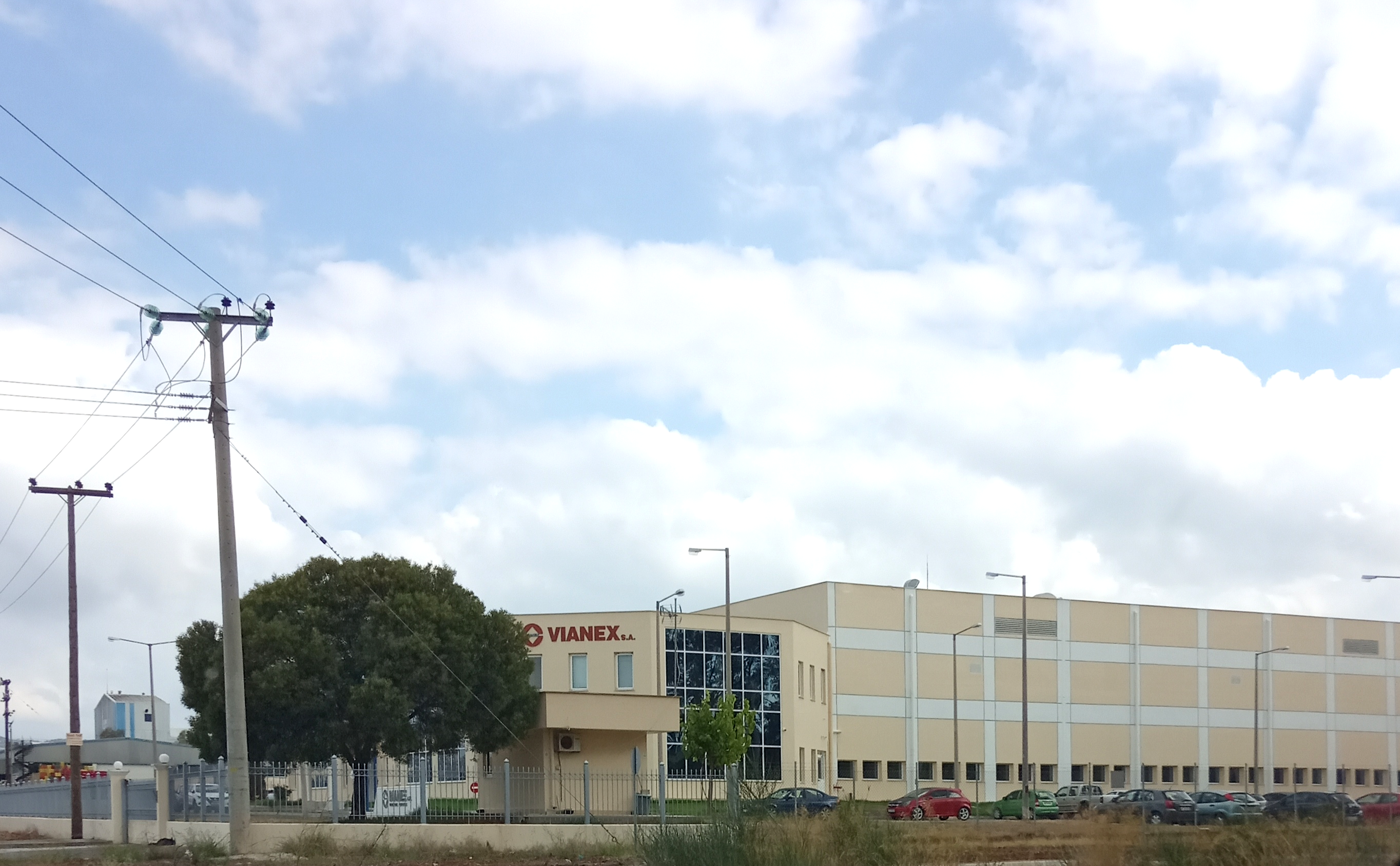
- VIANEX S.A. Factory D in the Industrial zone of Patras
- Type: Incorporated
- Industry: Pharmaceutical
- Founded: 1971
- Founder: Pavlos Giannakopoulos; Thanasis Giannakopoulos; Kostas Giannakopoulos
- Headquarters: Athens, Greece,
- Area served: Worldwide
- Key people: Dimitrios Giannakopoulos (Chairman & CEO)
- Revenue: €236.31 million (2017)
- Operating income: €45.041 million (2017)
- Net income: €4.491 million (2017)
- Total assets: €171.47 million (2017)
- Total equity: €129.18 million (2017)
- Number of employees: 1,070 (2015)
- Website: vianex.gr

Vianex S.A. (Greek: Βιανεξ Α.Ε.) is a Greek pharmaceutical company, founded in 1971 by the Giannakopoulos’ family that has been involved with the pharmaceutical industry since 1924.

The company produces, imports, packages, markets and distributes a large number of pharmaceuticals covering all the various therapeutic classes. It has also formed strategic partnerships and alliances with major pharmaceutical entities across the globe, such as Merck & Co. (U.S.A.), Sanofi Pasteur MSD (France) and Takeda Pharmaceutical Company Limited (Japan). VIANEX S.A. has also been exporting registered products for over 20 years in 35 countries in Europe (UK, France, Spain, Germany, Denmark, Netherlands, Cyprus), the Middle East (Jordan, S. Arabia), Africa (Tunisia, Sudan, South Africa, the Ivory Coast) and Asia (Philippines, Japan, Vietnam, Singapore, Taiwan).

The headquarters are located in Athens, Greece, while the company owns three factories in the Attica region and one in Patras, Greece.

VIANEX S.A. has also established its own Research & Development department, which undertakes the development of new pharmaceutical formulations for the treatment of various medicinal causes. The company recently began to cooperate with various universities on the research and development of new active molecules which are effective in the treatment of serious diseases.

== History ==
VIANEX’s origins date back to 1924, when Dimitrios Giannakopoulos, grandfather of Dimitrios Giannakopoulos, opened one of the first pharmacy stores in Athens, in Peiraios Street. After accumulating decades of family experience in the field, his son, Pavlos Giannakopoulos, founded PHARMAGIAN in 1960, a company that acted as a representative of major international pharmaceutical companies in Greece. Two decades of expansion followed and in 1971 the company became a societe anonyme (S.A.), changing its name to VIANEX, while in 1977 it began its manufacturing activities with the establishment of the first manufacturing plant in the Athens area.

A second plant was obtained from the Winthrop-Sterling company in 1983 in the Pallini region of Athens, while a third plant was added in VIANEX’s roster in 1985.

In 1995, developments and the growth of the over-the-counter (O.T.C.) sector led to VIANEX S.A. founding VIAN S.A., in order to distribute its O.T.C. pharmaceutical and non-pharmaceutical products.

The company’s expansion in various sectors of the pharmaceutical industry called for a fourth plant in 1999, this time in the industrial area of Patras, focusing on the manufacture of certain antibiotics. In 2006, VIANEX established a Research & Development spin-off company, ELDRUG S.A., which bases its work on the research findings of the University of Patras and on the University’s technical expertise.

In 2011, VIANEX became an approved supplier by the World Health Organization.

In 2019, VIANEX acquired Pharmanel pharmaceutical company.

== Products ==
The commercial portfolio of Vianex encompasses several distinct product categories, ranging from regulated pharmaceutical compounds to consumer healthcare goods. The primary segment consists of prescription-only medications (RX), which are classified across diverse therapeutic areas. These include treatments for chronic and acute conditions within gastroenterology, oncology, neurology, psychiatry, and urology, alongside specialized therapies for hypertension, cholesterol management, dermatological disorders, and osteoporosis. Furthermore, this regulated category comprises clinical supplies such as antibiotics, vaccines, systemic anti-inflammatories, blood derivatives, and targeted products for asthma and ophthalmic care.

In addition to prescription drugs, Vianex distributes over-the-counter (OTC) non-prescription medicines, primarily focusing on general analgesics and topical or systemic antiseptics. The healthcare lineup is further diversified through non-pharmaceutical sectors, which include nutritional supplements and infant nutrition formulations designed to meet specific dietary requirements. Finally, the company maintains operations in the medical diagnostics field and markets a dedicated line of consumer cosmetics, with a primary focus on specialized skincare and dermatological hygiene products.
