= Fabrice Lefrançois =

French basketball coach

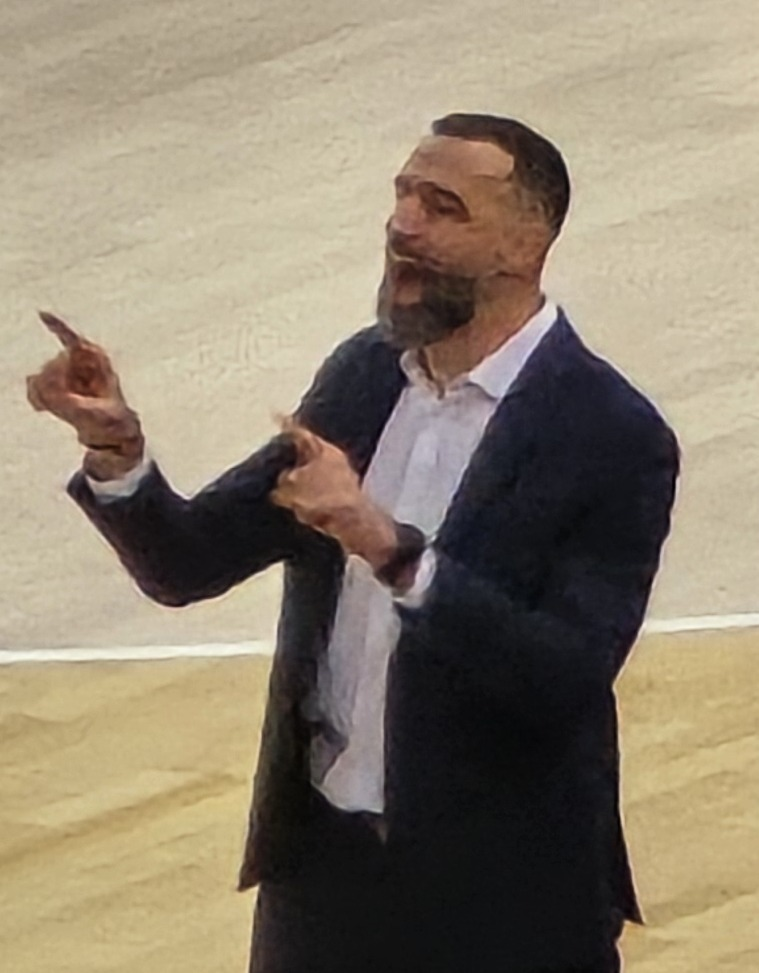

Cholet Basket
- Position: Head coach
- League: LNB Élite

Personal information
- Born: March 16, 1983 (age 43) Vitry-sur-Seine, France
- Coaching career: 2016–present

Career history

Coaching
- 2016–2017: ALM Evreux Basket (assistant)
- 2017–2020: ALM Evreux Basket
- 2022–2024: Cholet Basket (assistant)
- 2024–present: Cholet Basket

Fabrice Lefrançois (born 16 March 1983) is a French professional basketball coach who serves as the head coach for Cholet Basket of the French LNB Élite.

== Coaching career ==
In 2016, Lefrançois joined ALM Evreux Basket as an assistant coach. In 2017, he was promoted to head coach.

In 2022, Lefrançois was hired by Cholet Basket as an assistant coach. In 2024, Lefrançois was promoted to head coach of Cholet Basket.
