= Pavlos Giannakopoulos =

Greek businessman

Pavlos D. Giannakopoulos
- Born: Pavlos Giannakopoulos; 20 August 1929; Athens, Greece
- Died: 10 June 2018 (aged 88); Athens, Greece
- Occupation: Businessman
- Board member of: Vianex
- Children: Dimitrios Giannakopoulos
- Relatives: Thanasis Giannakopoulos (Brother)

Pavlos D. Giannakopoulos (Greek: Παύλος Δ. Γιαννακόπουλος; 20 August 1929 – 10 June 2018) was a Greek businessman, owner and president of Panathinaikos B.C. and president of Panathinaikos AC.

In December 2020 his son, Dimitris, founded the Pavlos Giannakopoulos Foundations that aims to support and promote sportsmanship, health, education, culture, environmental awareness, and sustainable development.

== Vianex ==
Along with his brother Thanasis Giannakopoulos, Giannakopoulos was an owner of the Greek pharmaceutical company Vianex. The family's involvement in pharmaceuticals dated to 1924, when his father Dimitrios Giannakopoulos opened a pharmacy in Athens; Pavlos founded Pharmagian in 1960, which became Vianex in 1971.

== Panathinaikos Athens ==
From 1987 to 2012, the Giannakopoulos brothers managed Panathinaikos' basketball, volleyball, and all amateur sports teams, from athletics to water polo. Their involvement with Panathinaikos' basketball team was their greatest success, in both domestic and European competitions. Pavlos was the President of the basketball department from 1987 to 2000 and together with his brother from 2003 to 2012.

Through 2012, Panathinaikos had won 13 out of the last 15 Greek Basket League championships (excluding the 2001–02, and 2011–12 seasons), and the EuroLeague championship in 1996, 2000, 2002, 2007, 2009, and 2011. The club, during that time, featured some of the best players of Greece, along with players from abroad, such as ex-NBAers Dominique Wilkins and Byron Scott, as well as European stars such as, Dejan Bodiroga, Nikos Galis, Panagiotis Giannakis and Stojan Vranković.

The basketball section of the club alone had a reported budget of €35 million in 2009. In 2011, Pavlos and his brother Thanasis, won the EuroLeague Club Executive of the Year Award. In 2012, Pavlos' son, Dimitris Giannakopoulos, took over control of Panathinaikos B.C.

In 2015, the indoor hall of Leoforos Alexandras Stadium was named "Pavlos Giannakopoulos", in his honour.

In 2024, Panathinaikos B.C. placed a statue of Pavlos Giannakopoulos at the VIP entrance of OAKA.

== Death ==
Giannakopoulos died at age 88 on 10 June 2018, the 47th anniversary of his first involvement with Panathinaikos and two days after his son was elected as the new president of Panathinaikos A.C.
