= Thanasis Giannakopoulos =

Greek businessman (died 2019)

Thanasis Giannakopoulos Θανάσης Γιαννακόπουλος
- Born: 27 February 1931; Athens, Greece
- Died: 19 March 2019 (aged 88); Ygeia Hospital, Marousi, Greece
- Occupation: Businessman
- Board member of: Vianex
- Relatives: Pavlos Giannakopoulos (brother); Dimitrios Giannakopoulos (nephew)

Athanasios "Thanasis" Giannakopoulos (Greek: Αθανάσιος «Θανάσης» Γιαννακόπουλος; 27 February 1931 – 19 March 2019) was a Greek businessman, and a one-time pro sports club owner. The Giannakopoulos family has a combined estimated net worth as per their collective €1 billion business empire.

== Vianex ==
He was born on 27 February 1931, in Athens. Giannakopoulos and his brother, Pavlos, were the owners of the pharmaceutical corporation Vianex, which was founded in 1924, by their father, Dimitrios Giannakopoulos, as a small local import and distribution firm. Vianex currently manufactures and markets, in Greece and elsewhere, a variety of products, in collaboration with leading international firms. The company reported net sales of €240.2 million in 2012.

In 2006, Pavlos' personal fortune was estimated to be €400 million euros, one half of the Giannakopoulos brothers' €800 million euros business empire.

== Panathinaikos Athens ==
From 1987 to 2012, the Giannakopoulos brothers managed Panathinaikos B.C., Panathinaikos V.C., and all of the Panathinaikos club's amateur sports sections, from the athletics department to the water polo department. Thanasis was also the Chairman of the volleyball and president of Panathinaikos A.O.

Thanasis was also President of the basketball club, from 2002 to 2012. Through 2012, Panathinaikos had won 13 out of the last 15 Greek Basket League championships (excluding the 2001–02, and 2011–12 seasons) and the EuroLeague championship in the years 1996, 2000, 2002, 2007, 2009, and 2011. The club, during that time, also featured some of the best basketball players from Greece, along with star players from abroad, such as Byron Scott, Dominique Wilkins and Dejan Bodiroga.

The basketball section of the club alone had a reported budget of €35 million in 2009. In 2011, Thanasis and his brother Pavlos, won the EuroLeague Club Executive of the Year Award. In 2012, Thanasis' nephew, Dimitrios Giannakopoulos, the son of his brother, Pavlos, took over control of Panathinaikos B.C.

== Personal life ==
Nicknamed as typhoon (tifonas) for his emotional character, Giannakopolous was also famous for his multi-coloured neckties with floral patterns.

=== Death ===
Giannakopoulos died of a stroke, at Ygeia Hospital, on 19 March 2019, at age 88.
