= Basketball at the Summer World University Games =

- Events: 2 (men: 1; women: 1)

Games
- 1959; 1960; 1961; 1962; 1963; 1964; 1965; 1966; 1967; 1968; 1970; 1970; 1973; 1972; 1975; 1975; 1977; 1978; 1979; 1981; 1983; 1985; 1987; 1989; 1991; 1993; 1995; 1997; 1999; 2001; 2003; 2005; 2007; 2009; 2011; 2013; 2015; 2017; 2019; 2021; 2025

Basketball tournaments have been staged at the Universiade since 1959. The men's tournament was introduced in 1951, and the women's tournament was introduced in 1961. The tournament was not held in 1975.In the 2025, the organizers chose 3x3 basketball as one of the optional sports which was contested in both its Olympic and wheelchair versions.

== Medal winners ==
=== Men ===
Games	Gold	Silver	Bronze
1959	Soviet Union	Italy	Czechoslovakia
1961	Soviet Union	Bulgaria	Czechoslovakia
1963	Brazil	Cuba	Peru
1965	United States	Soviet Union	Hungary
1967	United States	South Korea	Brazil
1970	Soviet Union	United States	Cuba
1973	United States	Soviet Union	Brazil
1977	United States	Soviet Union	Czechoslovakia
1979	United States	Yugoslavia	Cuba
1981	United States	Soviet Union	Yugoslavia
1983	Canada	Yugoslavia	United States
1985	Soviet Union	United States	Canada
1987	Yugoslavia	United States	Spain
1989	United States	Soviet Union	West Germany
1991	United States	Canada	Soviet Union
1993	United States	Canada	China
1995	United States	Japan	Canada
1997	United States	Canada	Brazil
1999	United States	FR Yugoslavia	Spain
2001	FR Yugoslavia	China	United States
2003	Serbia and Montenegro	Russia	Canada
2005	United States	Ukraine	Serbia and Montenegro
2007	Lithuania	Serbia	Canada
2009	Serbia	Russia	United States
2011	Serbia	Canada	Lithuania
2013	Russia	Australia	Serbia
2015	United States	Germany	Russia
2017	Lithuania	United States	Latvia
2019	United States	Ukraine	Australia
2021	Czech Republic	Brazil	United States
2025	Brazil	United States	Lithuania

=== 3x3 ===
==== Men ====
Games	Gold	Silver	Bronze
2025	Lithuania	United States	Czech Republic

==== Wheelchair 3x3 Men ====
Games	Gold	Silver	Bronze
2025	Spain	Great Britain	United States

=== Women ===
Games	Gold	Silver	Bronze
1961	Bulgaria	Soviet Union	Czechoslovakia
1965	Soviet Union	Czechoslovakia	Hungary
1967	South Korea	Japan	France
1970	Soviet Union	Czechoslovakia	Cuba
1973	Soviet Union	United States	North Korea
1977	Soviet Union	United States	Bulgaria
1979	United States	Cuba	Canada
1981	Soviet Union	United States	Romania
1983	United States	Romania	Yugoslavia
1985	Soviet Union	United States	Yugoslavia
1987	Yugoslavia	Soviet Union	China
1991	United States	Spain	Canada
1993	China	Cuba	United States
1995	Italy	United States	Japan
1997	United States	Cuba	Czech Republic
1999	Spain	United States	Russia
2001	United States	China	Czech Republic
2003	China	Italy	Russia
2005	United States	Serbia and Montenegro	Australia
2007	Australia	Russia	Poland
2009	United States	Russia	Australia
2011	United States	Chinese Taipei	Australia
2013	United States	Russia	Australia
2015	United States	Canada	Russia
2017	Australia	Japan	Chinese Taipei
2019	Australia	United States	Portugal
2021	China	Japan	Finland
2025	China	United States	Hungary

=== 3x3 ===
==== Women ====
Games	Gold	Silver	Bronze
2025	Germany	China	United States

==== Wheelchair 3x3 ====
Games	Gold	Silver	Bronze
2025	Germany	Spain	United States

== Combinated medal table ==
Last update during the 2025 FISU World Summer University Games

Rank	Nation	Gold	Silver	Bronze	Total
1	United States (USA)	25	14	8	47
2	Soviet Union (URS)	10	7	1	18
3	China (CHN)	4	3	2	9
4	Yugoslavia (YUG)	3	4	3	10
5	Australia (AUS)	3	1	5	9
6	Lithuania (LTU)	3	0	2	5
7	Spain (ESP)	2	2	2	6
8	Brazil (BRA)	2	1	3	6
9	Germany (GER)	2	1	0	3
9	Serbia (SRB)	2	1	0	3
11	Canada (CAN)	1	5	6	12
12	Russia (RUS)	1	5	5	11
13	Italy (ITA)	1	2	0	3
14	Bulgaria (BUL)	1	1	1	3
15	South Korea (KOR)	1	1	0	2
16	Czech Republic (CZE)	1	0	3	4
17	Serbia and Montenegro (SCG)	1	0	1	2
18	Cuba (CUB)	0	4	3	7
19	Japan (JPN)	0	4	1	5
20	Czechoslovakia (TCH)	0	2	4	6
21	Ukraine (UKR)	0	2	0	2
22	Chinese Taipei (TPE)	0	1	1	2
22	Romania (ROM)	0	1	1	2
24	Great Britain (GBR)	0	1	0	1
25	Hungary (HUN)	0	0	3	3
26	Finland (FIN)	0	0	1	1
26	France (FRA)	0	0	1	1
26	Latvia (LAT)	0	0	1	1
26	North Korea (PRK)	0	0	1	1
26	Peru (PER)	0	0	1	1
26	Poland (POL)	0	0	1	1
26	Portugal (POR)	0	0	1	1
26	West Germany (FRG)	0	0	1	1
Totals (33 entries)		63	63	63	189
