= Yugoslavia men's university basketball team =

National sports team

Medal record

Men's basketball

Representing Yugoslavia

Summer Universiade
Gold medal – first place	1987 Zagreb	
Silver medal – second place	1979 Mexico City	
Silver medal – second place	1983 Edmonton	
Bronze medal – third place	1981 București	

The Yugoslavia men's university basketball team (Serbo-Croatian: Univerzatetska košarkaška reprezentacija Jugoslavije) was the men's basketball team, administered by Basketball Federation of Yugoslavia, that represents Socialist Federal Republic of Yugoslavia in the Summer Universiade men's basketball tournament.

After the dissolution of SFR Yugoslavia in 1991, the successor countries all set up their own national university basketball teams.

== Competitive record ==
Year	Pos.	GP	W	L	Ref.
(Italy) 1959 Torino					
(Bulgaria) 1961 Sofia					
(Brazil) 1963 Porto Alegre					
(Hungary) 1965 Budapest					
(Japan) 1967 Tokyo					
(Italy) 1970 Turin					
(Soviet Union) 1973 Moscow					
(Italy) 1975 Rome	Not held				
(Bulgaria) 1977 Sofia					
1979 Mexico City	Silver medal				
(Romania) 1981 Bucharest	Bronze medal				
(Canada) 1983 Edmonton	Silver medal				
(Japan) 1985 Kobe					
(Socialist Federal Republic of Yugoslavia) 1987 Zagreb	Gold medal				
(West Germany) 1989 Duisburg					
(United Kingdom) 1991 Sheffield					
Total	?/15				

== Rosters ==
1973 Tournament	1977 Tournament	1979 Tournament	1981 Tournament	1983 Tournament	1987 Tournament
Dragan Vučinić	Zoran Prelević	Ivica Dukan; Stevan Gešovski; Sabit Hadžić; Andro Knego; Miodrag Marić; Mihovil Nakić; Aleksandar Pavličević; Aleksandar Petrović; Boban Petrović; Željko Poljak; Rajko Žižić	Zoran Radović; Aleksandar Petrović; Zufer Avdija	Dražen Petrović; Velimir Perasović; Goran Grbović; Marko Ivanović; Rajko Žižić	Vlade Divac; Dražen Petrović; Franjo Arapović; Zdravko Radulović; Stojko Vranković; Zoran Radović; Aleksandar Petrović; Goran Grbović; Mirko Milićević
		HC: Dušan Ivković	HC: Dušan Ivković		

== New national teams ==
After the dissolution of SFR Yugoslavia in 1991, five new countries were created: Bosnia and Herzegovina, Croatia, FYR Macedonia, FR Yugoslavia (in 2003, renamed to Serbia and Montenegro) and Slovenia. In 2006, Montenegro became an independent nation and Serbia became the legal successor of Serbia and Montenegro. In 2008, Kosovo declared independence from Serbia and became a FIBA member in 2015.

Here is a list of men's university teams on the SFR Yugoslavia area:

- Bosnia and Herzegovina (1992–present)
- Croatia (1992–present)
- North Macedonia (1993–present)
- Serbia and Montenegro (1992–2006)
  - Montenegro (2006–present)
  - Serbia (2006–present)
    - Kosovo (2015–present)
- Slovenia (1992–present)

== See also ==
- Yugoslavia men's national basketball team
- Yugoslavia men's national under-19 basketball team
- Yugoslavia men's national under-18 basketball team
- Yugoslavia men's national under-16 basketball team
