= Serbian men's university basketball team =

Medal record

Representing FR Yugoslavia
Gold medal – first place	2001 Beijing	
Silver medal – second place	1999 Palma de Mallorca	

Representing Serbia and Montenegro
Gold medal – first place	2003 Daegu	
Bronze medal – third place	2005 İzmir	

Representing Serbia
Gold medal – first place	2009 Belgrade	
Gold medal – first place	2011 Shenzhen	
Silver medal – second place	2007 Bangkok	
Bronze medal – third place	2013 Kazan	

The Serbian men's university basketball team (Serbian: Мушка универзитетска кошаркашка репрезентација Србије / Muška univerzitetska košarkaška reprezentacija Srbije) is the men's basketball team, administered by Basketball Federation of Serbia, that represents Serbia in the Summer Universiade men's basketball tournament.

The university team competed as FR Yugoslavia from 1993 to 2001, and as Serbia and Montenegro from 2003 to 2005.

== Competitive record ==
=== Representing Yugoslavia / Serbia and Montenegro ===
Year	Pos.	GP	W	L	Ref.
1959–1991	Part of (Socialist Federal Republic of Yugoslavia) SFR Yugoslavia				
As (Federal Republic of Yugoslavia) FR Yugoslavia
(United States) 1993 Buffalo, NY	Suspended				
(Japan) 1995 Fukuoka	Did not participate				
(Italy) 1997 Sicily	Did not participate				
(Spain) 1999 Palma de Mallorca	Silver medal				
(China) 2001 Beijing	Gold medal				
As Serbia and Montenegro
(South Korea) 2003 Daegu	Gold medal				
(Turkey) 2005 İzmir	Bronze medal				
Total	4/7				

=== Representing Serbia ===
Year	Pos.	GP	W	L	Ref.
(Thailand) 2007 Bangkok	Silver medal	8	7	1	
(Serbia) 2009 Belgrade	Gold medal	7	6	1	
(China) 2011 Shenzhen	Gold medal	7	6	1	
(Russia) 2013 Kazan	Bronze medal	8	7	1	
(South Korea) 2015 Gwangju	9th	8	6	2	
(Chinese Taipei) 2017 Taipei	4th	8	5	3	
(Italy) 2019 Naples	Did not participate				
(Germany) 2025 Rhine-Ruhr	Did not participate				
Total	6/8	46	37	9	

== Coaches ==
=== FR Yugoslavia / Serbia and Montenegro ===
Years	Head coach	Assistant coach(es)
1999	Nenad Trajković	Branislav Jemc
2001		Petar Rodić
2003	Vlade Đurović	
2005	Velimir Gašić	

=== Serbia ===
Years	Head coach	Assistant coach(es)
2007–2009	Aleksandar Kesar	Saša Nikitović
2011	(Montenegro) Luka Pavićević	Goran Miljković
2012	Dejan Mijatović	Đorđe Adžić, Zoran Todorović
2013	Oliver Popović	Vladimir Đokić, Zoran Todorović
2015	Vanja Guša	Zoran Todorović, Filip Socek
2017	Zoran Todorović	Ivan Smiljanić, Marko Dimitrijević
2019	Miodrag Rajković	

== Past rosters ==
=== Representing Yugoslavia / Serbia and Montenegro ===
1999 Tournament	2001 Tournament	2003 Tournament	2005 Tournament
Ognjen Aškrabić; Žarko Čabarkapa; Goran Čakić; Marko Kijac; Marko Peković; Nenad Pištoljević; Vanja Plisnić; Vladimir Rončević; Mladen Šekularac; Vladimir Tica; Luka Vučinić; Miloš Vujanić	Ognjen Aškrabić; Vule Avdalović; Goran Čakić; Stevan Nađfeji; Petar Popović; Aleksandar Smiljanić; Jovo Stanojević; Vladimir Tica; Slobodan Tošić; Luka Vučinić; Miloš Vujanić; Ivan Zoroski	Milan Bralović; Mile Ilić; Branko Jorović; Bojan Krstović; Milan Majstorović; Vukašin Mandić; Marko Marinović; Mladen Pantić; Vanja Plisnić; Bojan Popović; Ivan Todorović; Nikola Vasić	Nenad Bogdanović; Ivan Bošnjak; Dušan Đorđević; Milan Dozet; Vladimir Golubović; Feliks Kojadinović; Strahinja Milošević; Vanja Plisnić; Marko Šćekić; Milenko Tepić; Ivan Ivanović; Ilija Zolotović

=== Representing Serbia ===
2007 Tournament	2009 Tournament	2011 Tournament	2013 Tournament	2015 Tournament	2017 Tournament
Vukašin Aleksić; Dejan Borovnjak; Uroš Duvnjak; Vuk Ivanović; Đorđe Mičić; Igor Mijajlović; Strahinja Milošević; Ivan Paunić; Miljan Rakić; Marko Simonović; Čedomir Vitkovac; Vladan Vukosavljević	Nikola Koprivica; Milan Mačvan; Nemanja Protić; Nemanja Bjelica; Marko Kešelj; Strahinja Milošević; Vukašin Aleksić; Miroslav Raduljica; Marko Simonović; Ivan Paunić; Dejan Borovnjak; Vladimir Štimac	4 Mladen Jeremić; 5 Marko Ljubičić; 6 Stefan Živanović; 7 Sava Lešić; 8 Miloš Dimić; 9 Stefan Birčević; 10 Duško Bunić; 11 Vladimir Lučić; 12 Luka Drča; 13 Nikola Cvetinović; 14 Nikola Dragović; 15 Vladimir Štimac	4 Dejan Đokić; 5 Stefan Jović; 6 Miloš Dimić; 7 Nikola Malešević; 8 Đorđe Drenovac; 9 Nikola Kalinić; 10 Stefan Živanović; 11 Đorđe Majstorović; 12 Đorđe Gagić; 13 Ivan Smiljanić; 14 Nikola Marković; 15 Darko Balaban	4 Stefan Pot; 5 Jovan Novak; 6 Nikola Pešaković; 7 Ognjen Dobrić; 8 Dušan Kutlešić; 9 Saša Avramović; 10 Petar Torlak; 11 Aleksandar Marelja; 12 Nikola Jovanović; 13 Đorđe Drenovac; 14 Nemanja Todorović; 15 Milan Milovanović	5 Strahinja Jovanović; 6 Andrija Šarenac; 7 Nemanja Nenadić; 8 Nikola Pavlović; 9 Aleksa Nikolić; 10 Ilija Đoković; 11 Miloš Vraneš; 12 Veljko Brkić; 13 Andrija Matić; 14 Milenko Veljković; 15 Marko Tejić; 20 Novak Topalović

== See also ==
- Serbia at the 2011 Summer Universiade
- Serbia at the 2013 Summer Universiade
- 2009 Summer Universiade
- Serbia men's national under-20 basketball team
- Serbia men's national under-19 basketball team
- Serbia men's national under-18 basketball team
- Serbia men's national under-17 basketball team
- Serbia men's national under-16 basketball team
