= Saša Nikitović =

Serbian basketball player and coach

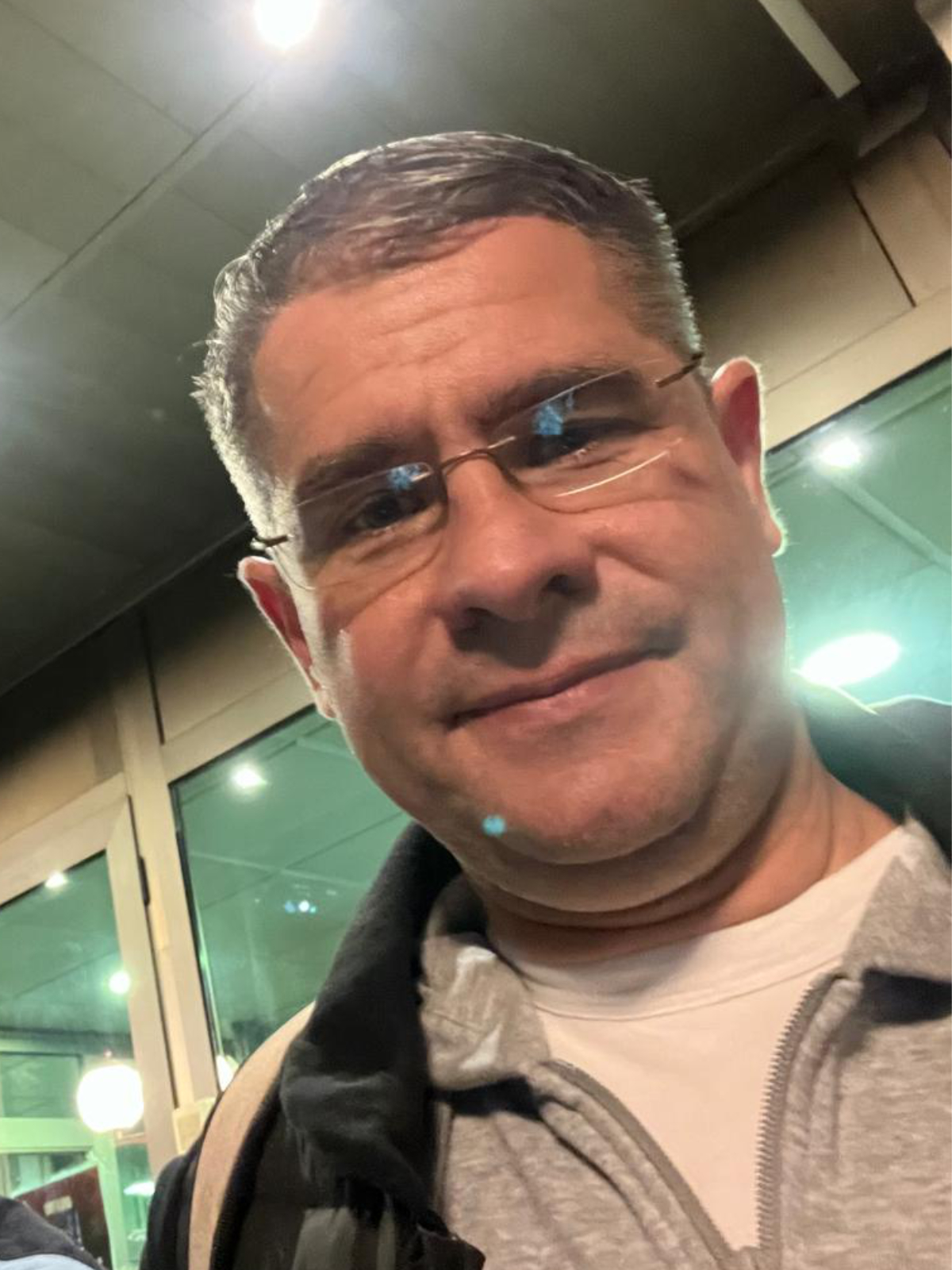
- Nikitović in 2025

FMP
- Title: Head coach
- League: Serbian League; ABA League

Personal information
- Born: 12 June 1979 (age 47) Belgrade, SR Serbia, SFR Yugoslavia

Career information
- NBA draft: 2001: undrafted
- Playing career: 1997–2003
- Position: Guard
- Coaching career: 2004–present

Career history

Coaching
- 2004–2005: Partizan (assistant)
- 2005–2008: Crvena zvezda (assistant)
- 2009–2013: Serbia (assistant)
- 2011: Crvena zvezda
- 2018–2019: Petrol Olimpija
- 2019–2021: Dynamic Belgrade (youth)
- 2021–2024: Dynamic Belgrade
- 2024: FMP
- 2025–present: FMP

Career highlights
- As assistant coach: YUBA League champion (2005); Serbian Cup winner (2006)
Medals
Men's basketball
Assistant coach for Serbia
FIBA EuroBasket
Silver medal – second place	2009 Poland	Team
Summer Universiade
Gold medal – first place	2009 Belgrade	Team
Silver medal – second place	2007 Bangkok	Team

Saša Nikitović (Note: Sometimes he was mistakenly referred to as Aleksandar Nikitović.) (Serbian Cyrillic: Саша Никитовић, born 12 June 1979), is a Serbian professional basketball coach and former player. He is the current head coach for FMP of the Serbian League (KLS) and the ABA League.

== Playing career ==
Nikitović played for Crvena zvezda, Radnički Obrenovac, Umka, Doboj (Bosnia and Herzegovina) and CSU Sibiu of the Romanian League.

== Coaching career ==
In 2004, Nikitović began his coaching career with Partizan in Belgrade as assistant coach of Duško Vujošević. Later he moved to Crvena zvezda where he worked as assistant coach with Dragan Šakota and Stevan Karadžić.

On 18 March 2011, Nikitović was named the head coach of Crvena zvezda of the Adriatic League and the Basketball League of Serbia, after the coach Mihailo Uvalin got fired.

On 19 November 2018, Nikitović was named a head coach of the Slovenian team Petrol Olimpija. On 19 February 2019 Olimpija parted ways with Nikitović after the contract was terminated by a mutual agreement.

In June 2019, was named the under-18 team head coach for Dynamic Belgrade, as well as their youth system coordinator. On 12 February 2021, Dynamic Belgrade hired Nikitović as their new first team head coach.

In January 2024, Nikitović was named the hear coach of FMP of the Basketball League of Serbia and ABA League.

=== National teams ===
Nikitović was an assistant coach of Dušan Ivković in the national team of Serbia at two FIBA EuroBaskets, 2009 in Poland and 2011 in Lithuania, and at the 2010 FIBA World Championship in Turkey. He won silver medal at EuroBasket 2009.

He was an assistant coach of Aleksandar Kesar in the university team of Serbia at two Summer Universiades, 2007 in Bangkok and 2009 in Belgrade. He won a gold medal at 2009 Universiade and a silver medal at 2007 Universiade.

Nikitović led the Serbia national under-16 team at the 2010 European U16 Championship in Montenegro and at the 2011 European U16 Championship in Czech Republic.

He led the Bahrain national team at the 2013 FIBA Asia Championship in Philippines.

== See also ==
- List of KK Crvena zvezda head coaches
