= Zoran Prelević =

Serbian basketball player and coach

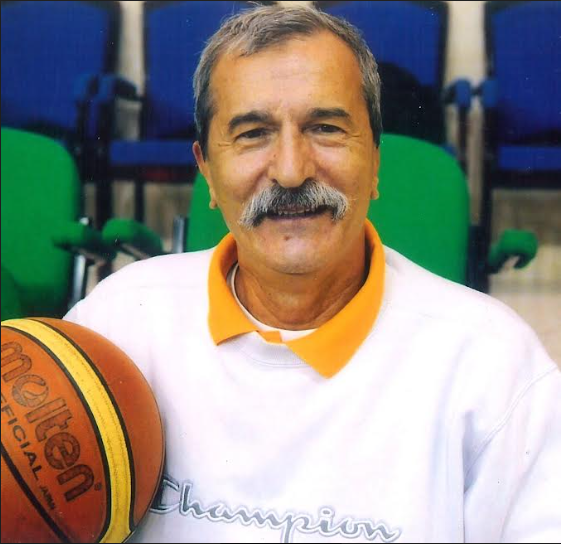

Personal information
- Born: 27 December 1952 (age 73) Sarajevo, Bosnia and Herzegovina, Yugoslavia

Career information
- NBA draft: 1974: undrafted
- Playing career: 1970–1981, 1983–1985
- Number: 7
- Coaching career: 1987–2015

Career history

Playing
- 1970–1981: Radnički Belgrade
- 1972–1973: → Vojvoda Stepa
- 1973–1975: → Jasenica
- 1983–1985: Šibenka

Coaching
- 1987–1989: Mladost Zemun
- 1992–1995: Al Hala
- 1995–1996: OKK Beograd
- 1996–1998: Al-Arabi
- 1998–2002: Al Wahda
- 2005–2006: Al Hala
- 2006–2007: Al Ittihad Alexandria
- 2007: Hübner Nyíregyháza
- 2012–2013: Al-Shamal

Zoran Prelević (Serbian Cyrillic: Зоран Прелевић, born 27 December 1952) is a Serbian professional basketball coach and former player.

== Playing career ==
During his playing days, Prelević played for Radnički Belgrade, KK Vojvoda Stepa, KK Jasenica from Smederevska Palanka, and Šibenka. He retired as a player with Šibenka in 1985.

Playing ban

In 1981, Prelević did not get an apartment from Radnički he was supposed to get under the contract, so he refused to play. Because of that, Radnički banned him permanently. A year later, Radomir Šaper and the Basketball Federation of Yugoslavia annulled the Radnički ban.

== National team career ==
Prelević was a member of the Yugoslavia team that won the gold medal at the 1976 Balkan Championship. Also, he was a member of the Yugoslavia university basketball team at the 1977 Summer Universiade.

== Coaching career ==
After retirement, Prelević was as the head coach of Mladost Zemun. In 1992, he became the head coach of Al Hala of the Bahraini Premier League. He won the Bahraini League and the National Cup in 1994. He coached Al Hala until 1995. Thereafter, he coached OKK Beograd, Al-Arabi (Qatar), Al Wahda (UAE), Al Ittihad Alexandria (Egypt), Hübner Nyíregyháza (Hungary), and Al-Shamal (Qatar).

=== National team coaching career ===
Prelević was the head coach of Bahrain (1992–1995), Qatar U19 (2002–2003), Kuwait U19 (2003–2005), and Oman (2008–2011).

== Personal life ==
Prelević earned his bachelor's degree in transport engineering from the University of Belgrade in 1979. He worked as the PTT High School in Belgrade as a telecommunications teacher, from 1986 to 1991. In 1989, he earned his bachelor's degree in basketball coaching from the University of Belgrade.

== Career achievements ==
As player

- Yugoslav Cup winner: 1 (with Radnički Belgrade: 1975–76)

As coach

- Bahraini Premier League champion: 1 (with Al Hala: 1993–94)
- Bahraini Cup winner: 1 (with Al Hala: 1994)
