= Goran Ćakić =

Serbian basketball player and executive

Mega Basket
- Title: General manager
- League: Adriatic League; Basketball League of Serbia

Personal information
- Born: 21 May 1980 (age 46) Belgrade, SR Serbia, SFR Yugoslavia
- Listed height: 2.09 m (6 ft 10 in)
- Listed weight: 109 kg (240 lb)

Career information
- NBA draft: 2002: undrafted
- Playing career: 1998–2013
- Position: Power forward

Career history
- 1998–2000: Beobanka
- 2000–2001: BKK Radnički
- 2002: Budućnost Podgorica
- 2002–2003: Crvena zvezda
- 2003–2004: Partizan
- 2004: SLUC Nancy
- 2004–2006: Apollon Patras
- 2006–2009: Khimik
- 2009: Azovmash
- 2009–2010: Banvit
- 2010: Mega Vizura
- 2010: Scavolini Pesaro
- 2010–2011: Trabzonspor
- 2011–2012: Astana
- 2012–2013: Mega Basket
Medals
Representing FR Yugoslavia
Universiade
Gold medal – first place	2001 Beijing	National Team

Goran Ćakić (born 21 May 1980) is a Serbian professional basketball executive and former player. He is currently working as a General Menager in Mega Basket.

== Playing career ==
Before starting his professional career, Ćakić played for Prele Basket and Crvena zvezda in the younger categories, with which he became the national junior champion.

He began his professional career in 1998, when he played for Beobanka in the YUBA League. He wore the team's jersey for two seasons, and in the second season, he also played in the playoffs with Beobanka.

In the 2000/2001 season, he wore the jersey of BKK Radnički, and the following season, he played for Budućnost Podgorica in the EuroLeague. In the 2002/2003 season, he became a member of Crvena zvezda, with which he reached the semifinals of the YUBA League. He spent the 2003/2004 season with their eternal rival, Partizan, and after that, Ćakić began his international career, playing in France, Greece, Ukraine, Turkey, Italy, and Kazakhstan for teams such as SLUC Nancy, Apollon Patras, Khimik, Azovmash, Banvit, Scavolini Pesaro, Trabzonspor, and Astana.

Ćakić was selected to play at 2000 Nike Hoop Summit in Indianapolis. He represented Serbia at University games in 1999 where he won silver and 2001 where he won gold medal. He was also member of Serbian U20 team at FIBA Europe Under-20 Championship in 2000.

== Post-playing career ==
After the end of his playing career, Ćakić served as the team manager for Mega Basket in the 2013/2014 season.

=== Executive career ===
Since 2014, Ćakić has become the General Manager of the team. That very year, Nikola Jokić, Vasilije Micić, and Nemanja Dangubić were selected in the NBA draft, and Mega became recognized as a club where young players develop. Later, Rade Zagorac, Timothé Luwawu-Cabarrot, Ivica Zubac, Vlatko Čančar, Ognjen Jaramaz, Alpha Kaba, Goga Bitadze, Marko Simonović, Filip Petrušev, Karlo Matković, Nikola Jović, and the most recent addition, Nikola Đurišić, also made their way to the NBA.

As the General Manager of the team, Ćakić has won one National Cups in 2016 and finished in second place in the Adriatic League the same year.

Since 2013, Ćakić has been a member of the Executive Board of the KLS and a member of the General Assembly of the Adriatic League.

From 2022 to 2024, he served as the vice president, and in the season 2024/2025, he became the president of the Adriatic League as a representative of his club Mega Vizura .

In 2022, the junior team of Mega became European champions in their age group by winning the Euroleague Basketball Next Generation Tournament.
