= Predrag Stojančev =

- Born: April 17, 1980 (age 46); Belgrade, SR Serbia, SFR Yugoslavia
- Occupation: Basketball coach

Career history
- 1990–1999: Crvena zvezda (youth)
- 1999–2003: Mladost Zemun

Coaching career
- 2003–2005: KK Zvezdara
- 2005–2007: BC Eurobasket (Malta)
- 2007–2011: KK Stari DIF
- 2011–2016: KK Zvezdara
- 2013–2014: University of Belgrade
- 2016–2017: Xiamen University
- 2017–2023: Shanghai Sharks (youth/asst.)
- 2023–2024: Bishrelt Metal
- 2024–2025: Selenge Bodons
- 2026–present: Sono Brothers

Career highlights
- As a player: FR Yugoslavia U18 Champion (1998); As a coach: European Universities Bronze (2013); Fujian Provincial Champion (2016–17); Mongolian League Runner-up (2024); Mongolian All-Star Coach (2024); Mongolian All-Star Coach (2025)

Medals
- Men's basketball Representing Serbia; European Universities Championship; B Split 2013 (Team)

Predrag Stojančev (born April 17, 1980) is a Serbian professional basketball coach and former player. He is currently the head coach for Sono Brothers of the Mongolian Premier League. During his career, he has worked in Serbia, Malta, China, and Mongolia.

== Playing career ==
Stojančev developed in the youth system of KK Crvena zvezda (1990–1999). He was part of the generation that became the FR Yugoslavia U18 champion in 1998, playing alongside future NBA players Vladimir Radmanović and Miloš Vujanić. He continued his professional career with KK Mladost Zemun under coach Aleksandar Kesar.

== Coaching career ==
=== Early years in Serbia ===
Stojančev began his coaching career at KK Zvezdara (2003–2005), where he coached Bogdan Bogdanović during the player's early development. After a stint in Malta, he returned to Belgrade to lead KK Stari DIF, achieving two consecutive promotions from the fifth to the third tier of Serbian basketball. In 2009, he was named Coach of the Year in his category.

As the head coach of the University of Belgrade national team, he won a bronze medal at the 2013 European Universities Basketball Championship in Split.

=== China ===
In 2016, Stojančev moved to China to lead Xiamen University to the Fujian Provincial Championship. From 2017 to 2023, he worked at the development center of the Shanghai Sharks, coaching the youth teams and serving as an assistant for the senior team.

=== Mongolia ===
In October 2023, he was appointed head coach of Bishrelt Metal in Mongolia. He led the team to the finals of the Mongolian Premier League (MBA) and participated in the Basketball Champions League Asia qualifiers.

In September 2024, Stojančev became the head coach of Selenge Bodons. The club's signing of four-time NBA All-Star DeMarcus Cousins brought significant international attention to the team under Stojančev's leadership.

In October 2026, he was appointed head coach of Sono Brothers.

== Achievements ==
- FR Yugoslavia U18 Champion (as a player): 1998
- European Universities Championship Bronze medal: 2013
- Fujian Provincial Champion: 2016–17
- Mongolian League Runner-up: 2024
- Mongolian League All-Star Coach: 2024
- Mongolian League All-Star Coach: 2025
