= Vanja Plisnić =

Serbian professional basketball player

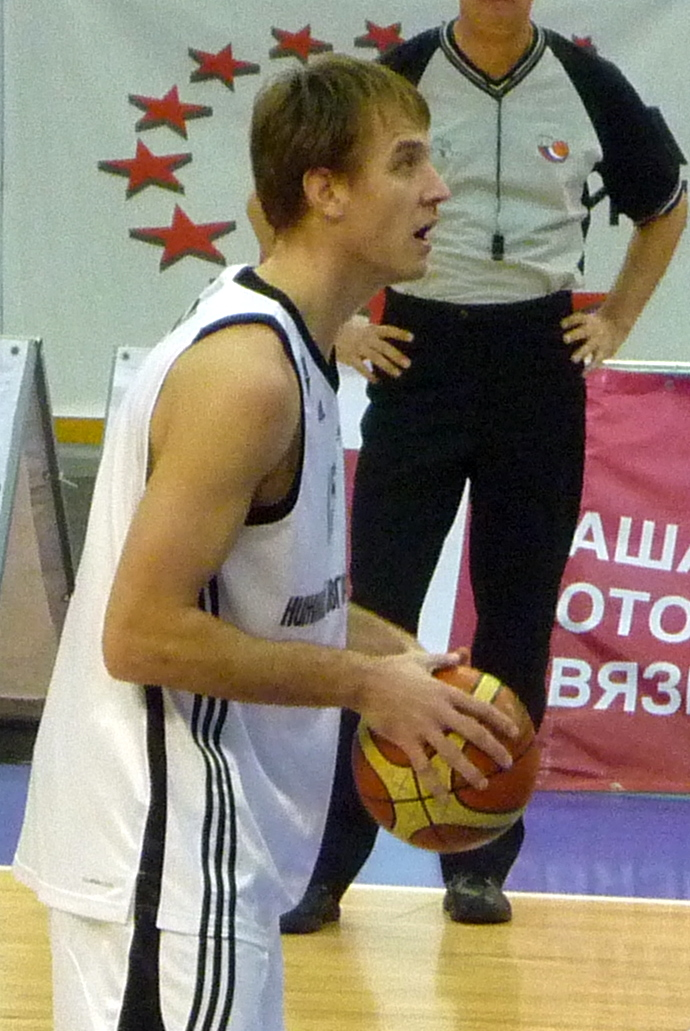

Personal information
- Born: July 28, 1980 (age 46) Zenica, SR Bosnia and Herzegovina, SFR Yugoslavia
- Listed height: 2.05 m (6 ft 9 in)
- Listed weight: 105 kg (231 lb)

Career information
- NBA draft: 2002: undrafted
- Playing career: 1997–2016
- Position: Power forward

Career history
- 1997–1998: Novi Sad
- 1998–2000: Radnički Belgrade
- 2000–2002: NIS Vojvodina
- 2002–2004: FMP Železnik
- 2004–2006: NIS Vojvodina
- 2006: Telindus Oostende
- 2007: Hemofarm
- 2007–2009: Ural Great Perm
- 2009–2010: Angelico Biella
- 2010–2011: Nizhny Novgorod
- 2011–2012: Dinamo Sassari
- 2012–2015: TED Ankara Kolejliler
- 2015–2016: Torku Konyaspor

Career highlights
- Adriatic League champion (2004); Serbian Cup winner (2003)
Medals
Representing FR Yugoslavia / Serbia and Montenegro
Universiade
Silver medal – second place	1999 Palma de Mallorca	National Team
Gold medal – first place	2003 Daegu	National Team
Bronze medal – third place	2005 İzmir	National Team

Vanja Plisnić (Serbian Cyrillic: Вања Плиснић; born July 28, 1980) is a Serbian former professional basketball player. He is a 2,05 m tall power forward.

With FMP Železnik Plisnić won the 2003 Serbia & Montenegro National Cup and the 2004 Adriatic League. He has been member of the Yugoslav Under-20 National Team, played at the 2000 European Under-20 Championship. He was member of the Serbia & Montenegro University National Team, won the gold medal at the 2003 Summer Universiade and bronze medal at the 2005 Summer Universiade .
