= Žarko Čabarkapa =

Serbian basketball player & executive (born 1981)

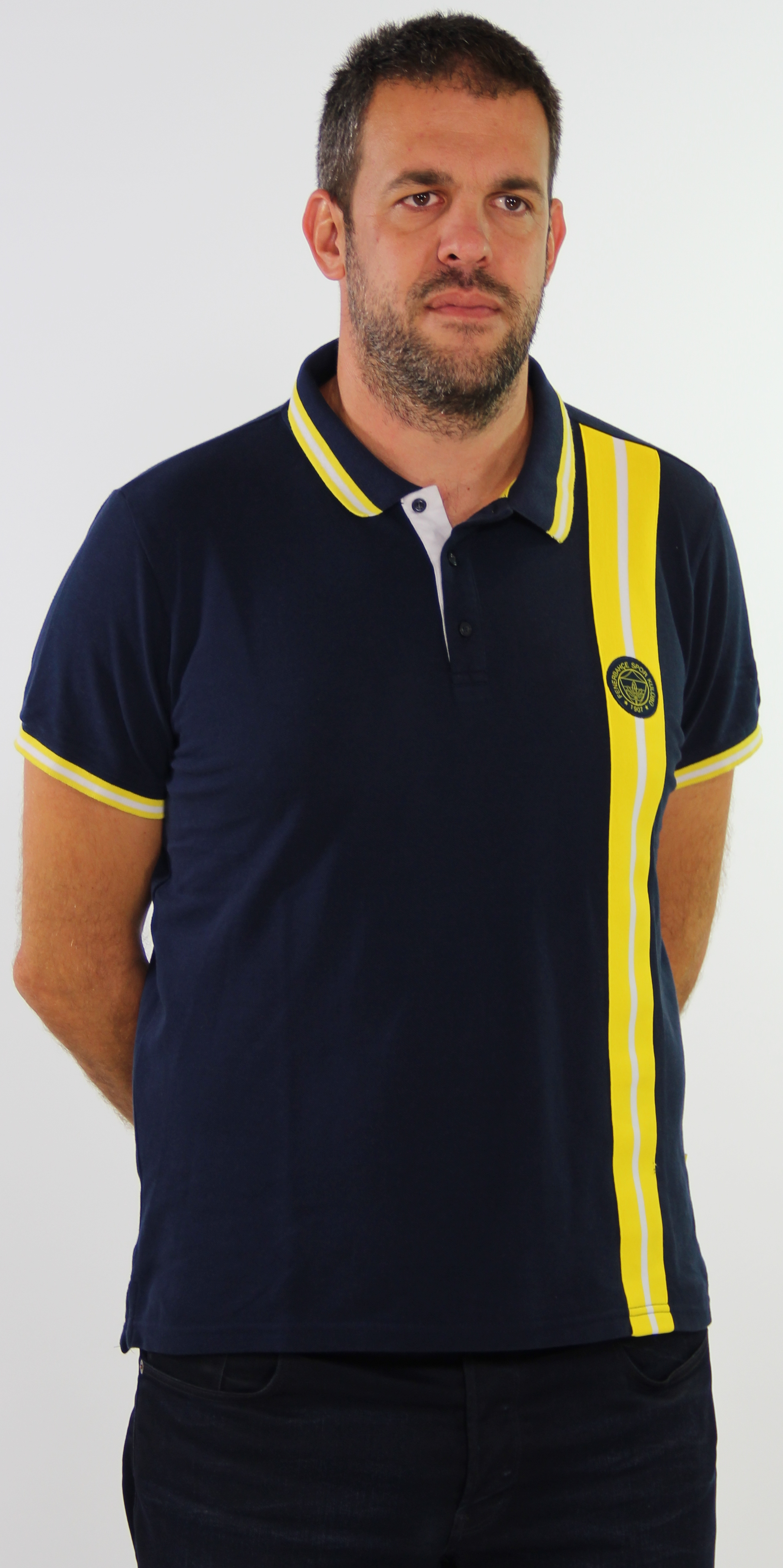
- Čabarkapa with Fenerbahçe in 2021

Personal information
- Born: May 21, 1981 (age 45) Zrenjanin, SR Serbia, SFR Yugoslavia
- Listed height: 6 ft 11 in (2.11 m)
- Listed weight: 235 lb (107 kg)

Career information
- NBA draft: 2003: 1st round, 17th overall pick
- Drafted by: Phoenix Suns
- Playing career: 1997–2009
- Position: Power forward
- Number: 6, 11, 15

Career history
- 1997–2001: Beopetrol
- 2001–2003: Budućnost
- 2003–2005: Phoenix Suns
- 2005–2007: Golden State Warriors
- 2009: Budućnost
- Stats at NBA.com
- Stats at Basketball Reference
Medals
Men's basketball
Representing Yugoslavia
World Championships
Gold medal – first place	2002 Indianapolis	National team
Universiade
Silver medal – second place	1999 Palma de Mallorca	University team

Žarko Čabarkapa (Serbian Cyrillic: Жарко Чабаркапа, pronounced [ʒǎːrkɔ̝ tʃabǎrkapa]; born 21 May 1981) is a Serbian professional basketball executive and former player.

Standing at 2.11 m (6 ft 11 in), he played in the power forward position for Beopetrol, Budućnost, Phoenix Suns, and Golden State Warriors. Čabarkapa finished his playing career in 2009 due to injury.

A Yugoslav international, (Note: Čabarkapa represented then FR Yugoslavia (later Serbia and Montenegro) internationally.) Čabarkapa won the gold medal at the 2002 FIBA World Championship.

== Playing career ==
Čabarkapa played for a Belgrade-based team Beopetrol and Podgorica-based team Budućnost, both of the YUBA League. When playing there, he averaged 8.6 points, 3.8 rebounds, and 1.5 assists per game.

Čabarkapa was drafted by the Phoenix Suns in the 1st round (17th overall) in the 2003 NBA draft. He moved to the United States, but in his rookie season he was injured, and this limited him to only 49 games that season. In 2005, the Suns traded him to the Golden State Warriors in exchange for two second-round draft picks. With the Warriors, he played in 37 games in 2004–05, and 61 games in 2005–06. He had problems with a back injury, and his contract with the Warriors ended in 2007.

Čabarkapa's final NBA game was played on April 15, 2006, in a 86–81 win over the Portland Trail Blazers where he recorded four rebounds in four minutes of playing time.

After leaving the NBA in 2007, Čabarkapa stopped playing competitive basketball at the age of 26, as he recuperated from injuries. In late November 2008, it was announced that he joined his old club Budućnost, but only in practices, as he looked to get himself back into competitive shape. On January 16, 2009, Čabarkapa signed with Budućnost. Two days later, on January 18, he played his first competitive game in more than two years, appearing for 4 minutes in the Adriatic League clash at home versus KK Cibona. He recorded 2 points, no rebounds, and no assists.

== National team career ==
Čabarkapa was a member of the FR Yugoslavia U-20 team at the 2000 FIBA Europe Under-20 Championship in Ohrid, Macedonia. Over eight tournament games, he averaged 8.0 points, 3.0 rebounds, and 1.6 assists per game. He was a member of the Yugoslavian university team that won the silver medal at the 1999 Summer Universiade in Palma de Mallorca, Spain.

Čabarkapa was a member of the FR Yugoslavia national team that won the gold medal at the 2002 FIBA World Championship in Indianapolis. Over five tournament games, he averaged 1.6 points and one rebound per game.

== Post-playing career ==
Čabarkapa was a sports director of the Adriatic Basketball Association from September 2015 to June 2019.

On 2 October 2019, Čabarkapa was hired as the new sports director for Crvena zvezda. He left the Zvezda after the end of the 2019–20 season.

In November 2020, Čabarkapa joined the administration staff of the Turkish club Fenerbahçe Basketball.

== See also ==
- List of European basketball players in the United States
- List of Montenegrin NBA players
- List of Serbian NBA players

== Notes ==
Sporting positions
Preceded by Nebojša Ilić	Sporting Director of KK Crvena zvezda 2019–2020	Succeeded by Nemanja Vasiljević
New creation	Sporting Director of the Adriatic Basketball Association; 2015–2019	Succeeded by Milija Vojinović
