= Aleksandar Smiljanić =

Serbian basketball player and executive

Dynamic Belgrade
- Title: Technical secretary
- League: Basketball League of Serbia

Personal information
- Born: 8 March 1976 (age 50) Sremska Mitrovica, SR Serbia, SFR Yugoslavia
- Listed height: 1.95 m (6 ft 5 in)

Career information
- NBA draft: 1998: undrafted
- Playing career: 1993–2011
- Position: Shooting guard
- Number: 5, 17

Career history
- 1993–1995: KK Srem
- 1995–1997: BFC Beočin
- 1997–2001: FMP
- 2001–2003: Budućnost
- 2003–2005: Maroussi
- 2005–2006: Lokomotiv Rostov
- 2006: Partizan
- 2006: Mega Ishrana
- 2006–2007: Lviv Polytechnic
- 2008: KK Mogren
- 2008–2009: Avtodor Saratov
- 2009–2010: Luka Koper
- 2010–2011: ENAD
- 2011: Železničar Inđija
Medals
Men's basketball
Representing FR Yugoslavia
Universiade
Gold medal – first place	2001 Beijing

Aleksandar Smiljanić (Serbian Cyrillic: Александар Смиљанић; born 8 March 1976) is a Serbian basketball executive and former professional player.

== Playing career ==
During his professional career, Smiljanić played for numerous clubs in Serbia and abroad in Europe.

== National team career ==
Smiljanić was a member of the FR Yugoslavian university team that won the gold medal at the 2001 Summer Universiade in Beijing, China. Smiljanić was on the preliminary squad as the thirteenth player for the 2002 FIBA World Championship. Despite not making the final cut, Smiljanić received a gold medal instead of Vladimir Radmanović who was ostracized from the team due to indiscipline during the tournament.

== Post-playing career ==
Smiljanić worked as a scout of the Fast Break basketball agency from 2010 to 2012. Later, he was named as a technical secretary of Dynamic Belgrade.

Smiljanić was the team manager of the Serbia men's U19 team at the 2021 FIBA Under-19 Basketball World Cup in Latvia.

== Career achievements ==
- Serbia-Montenegro League champion: 1 (with Partizan Pivara MB: 2005–06)
- Russian Super League (2nd-tier) champion: 1 (with Avtodor Saratov: 2008–09)
- Yugoslav Cup winner: 1 (with FMP Železnik: 1997)
