= Yugoslavia men's national basketball team =

Former national sports team

Yugoslavia
- FIBA ranking: Defunct
- Joined FIBA: 1936
- FIBA zone: FIBA Europe
- National federation: Basketball Federation of Yugoslavia
- Nickname: Plavi (The Blues)

Olympic Games
- Appearances: 8
- Medals: (gold) Gold: (1980); (silver) Silver: (1968, 1976, 1988); (bronze) Bronze: (1984)

FIBA World Cup
- Appearances: 10
- Medals: (gold) Gold: (1970, 1978, 1990); (silver) Silver: (1963, 1967, 1974); (bronze) Bronze: (1982, 1986)

FIBA EuroBasket
- Appearances: 21
- Medals: (gold) Gold: (1973, 1975, 1977, 1989, 1991); (silver) Silver: (1961, 1965, 1969, 1971, 1981); (bronze) Bronze: (1963, 1979, 1987)
Home	Away
Medal record
Olympic Games
Gold medal – first place	1980 Moscow
Silver medal – second place	1968 Mexico City
Silver medal – second place	1976 Montreal
Silver medal – second place	1988 Seoul
Bronze medal – third place	1984 Los Angeles
FIBA World Cup
Gold medal – first place	1970 Yugoslavia
Gold medal – first place	1978 Philippines
Gold medal – first place	1990 Argentina
Silver medal – second place	1963 Brazil
Silver medal – second place	1967 Uruguay
Silver medal – second place	1974 Puerto Rico
Bronze medal – third place	1982 Colombia
Bronze medal – third place	1986 Spain
FIBA EuroBasket
Gold medal – first place	1973 Spain
Gold medal – first place	1975 Yugoslavia
Gold medal – first place	1977 Belgium
Gold medal – first place	1989 Yugoslavia
Gold medal – first place	1991 Italy
Silver medal – second place	1961 Yugoslavia
Silver medal – second place	1965 Soviet Union
Silver medal – second place	1969 Italy
Silver medal – second place	1971 West Germany
Silver medal – second place	1981 Czechoslovakia
Bronze medal – third place	1963 Poland
Bronze medal – third place	1979 Italy
Bronze medal – third place	1987 Greece
Goodwill Games
Gold medal – first place	1990 Seattle
Mediterranean Games
Gold medal – first place	1959 Beirut
Gold medal – first place	1967 Tunis
Gold medal – first place	1971 Izmir
Gold medal – first place	1975 Algiers
Gold medal – first place	1983 Casablanca
Silver medal – second place	1979 Split
Bronze medal – third place	1963 Naples
Summer Universiade
Gold medal – first place	1987 Zagreb
Silver medal – second place	1979 Mexico City
Silver medal – second place	1983 Edmonton
Bronze medal – third place	1981 București

The Yugoslavia men's national basketball team (Serbo-Croatian: Košarkaška reprezentacija Jugoslavije / Кошаркашка репрезентација Југославије; Slovene: Jugoslovanska košarkarska reprezentanca; Macedonian: Кошаркарска репрезентација на Југославија) represented the Socialist Federal Republic of Yugoslavia from 1943 until 1992 in international basketball, and was controlled by the Basketball Federation of Yugoslavia.

After World War II, the team steadily improved their rankings and came to be one of the dominant forces of world basketball in the 1970s and the 1980s, along with the United States and Soviet Union, capturing five Olympic medals and eight World Cups, thirteen medals in total, along with another thirteen on the continental level at EuroBasket.

Twelve FIBA Hall of Fame members emerged from the Yugoslav national team: Krešimir Ćosić, Dražen Dalipagić, Ivo Daneu, Mirza Delibašić, Vlade Divac, Dragan Kićanović, Radivoj Korać, Toni Kukoč, Dražen Petrović, Zoran Slavnić, Jure Zdovc and Dino Rađa.

== History ==
=== 1947–1957 ===
Yugoslavia made its European championship debut in EuroBasket 1947, the fifth edition of the tournament. The team placed 13th out of 14 teams in the competition, losing to the Soviet Union and Hungary in the preliminary round, beating the Netherlands but losing to Italy in the semifinal round (placing third in the three-way tie between the teams), and defeating Albania in the 13th/14th classification match. Yugoslavia's second appearance was at EuroBasket 1953 in Moscow. They dropped an early 27–25 decision against Bulgaria but finished at 3–1 in their preliminary group. In the three-way tie-breaker with Bulgaria and Israel, Yugoslavia ended up in second place to advance to the final round. There, they won 3 but lost 4 to take 6th place overall in the 17-team tournament. Yugoslavia again advanced to the final round at EuroBasket 1955 in Budapest, this time in sole second place with a 3–1 record in the preliminary round pool. Their final round performance was riddled with 6 losses in 7 games, but did include the high point of a 52–49 victory over eventual silver medallist Czechoslovakia on Yugoslavia's way to an 8th-place finish of the 18 entrants. Yugoslavia placed 6th at EuroBasket 1957 in Sofia, where they managed to make two wins in final round robin, defeating Poland and France to finish at 2–5 for 6th place in the tournament.

=== 1961–1970 ===
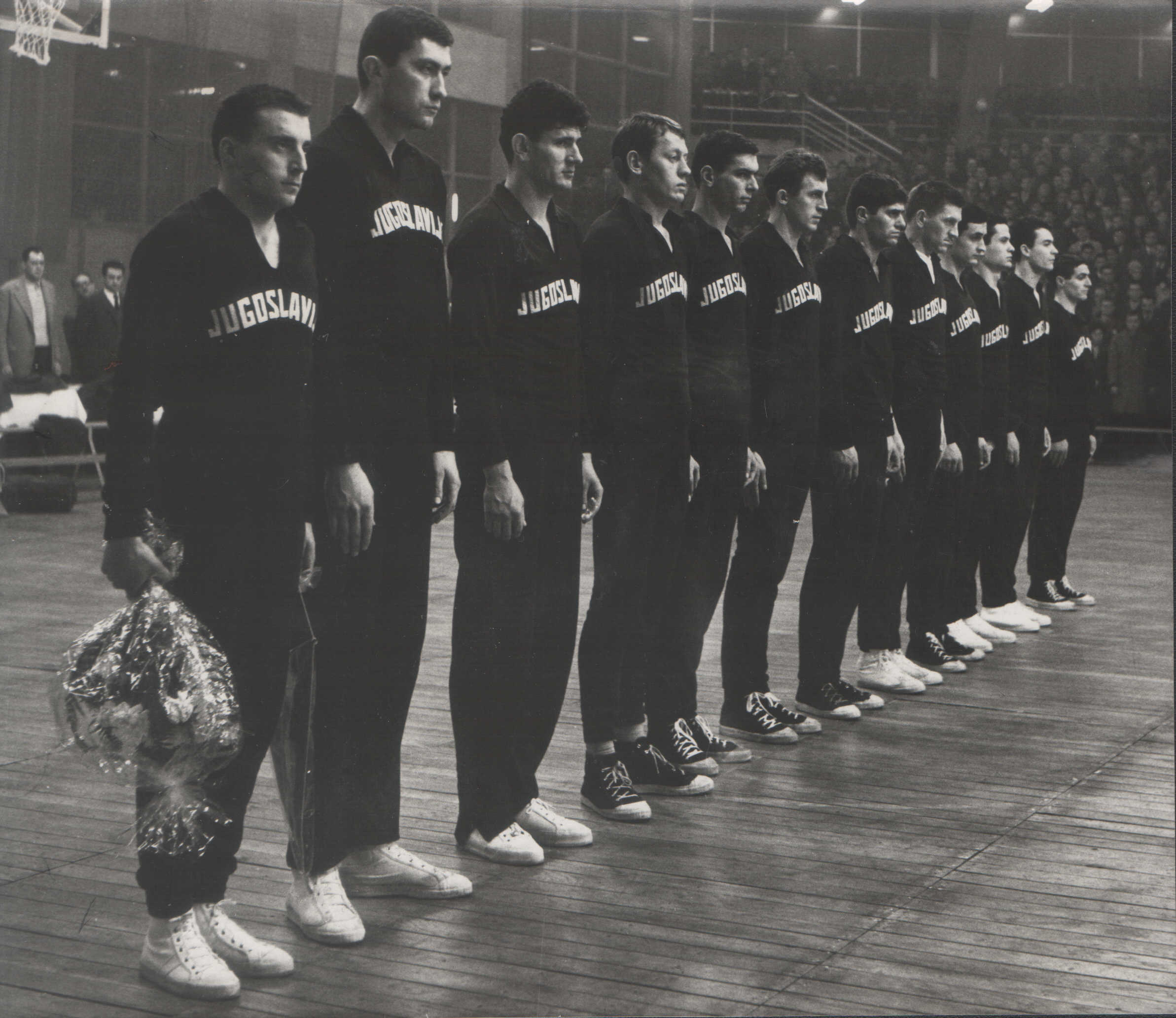
Yugoslav roster at EuroBasket 1961 on home soil in Belgrade. Though losing the final versus the Soviet Union, Yugoslavia's silver was its very first major competition medal.

Yugoslavia got a bronze at EuroBasket 1963, where they were defeated 72–83 by Poland in semifinal, and then won the Bronze medal game 89–61 against Hungary. They won a silver medal at EuroBasket 1961, where they were defeated 53–60 by Soviet Union in the final. This achievement was followed by another silver medal at the 1963 FIBA World Championship, eventually won by Brazil. At EuroBasket 1965 they were again defeated by Soviet Union in the final. Yugoslavia participated in the 1967 FIBA World Championship, won by Soviet Union, where they placed second. Yugoslavia defeated all opponents except United States in Group A at the 1968 Summer Olympics basketball tournament, in which they were grouped also with Italy, Spain, Puerto Rico, Panama, Philippines, and Senegal. They advanced to the knockout stage, where they managed to defeat Soviet Union 62–63. They played again against the United States in the final, and were again defeated 65–50. With 16 points scored, Ivo Daneu, who was the scoring leader against Panama, Italy and the United States in the preliminary round, was Yugoslavia's scoring leader also in the final.

At the EuroBasket 1969 they were defeated 81–72 in the final, again by Soviet Union. On this occasion, Ivo Daneu and Krešimir Ćosić were selected in the All-Tournament Team. Kapičić was the scoring leader against Greece, Simonović against Sweden, Daneu against Hungary, Ćosić against Soviet Union and Poland, and Rajković scored 16 pts in the final, followed by Daneu with 12. Yugoslavia won their first gold in a major tournament at the 1970 FIBA World Championship, where they defeated Brazil (55–80), the United States (70–63), and Soviet Union (72–87). Krešimir Ćosić, who led Yugoslavia to one of the greatest runs in international basketball history, was included in the All-Tournament Team. He was the scoring leader against Italy; against Brazil with 19 points, followed by Simonović with 17, against Czechoslovakia, Uruguay, and the United States, followed by Skansi. The scoring leader in the decisive game against Soviet Union was Rajković (14), followed by Jelovac (13).

Up to 1974 Ivo Daneu was the only Yugoslav player named FIBA Basketball World Cup MVP, and to this day he and Dragan Kićanović remain the only Yugoslav players inducted in it and the FIBA Hall of Fame. Dražen Dalipagić, Dražen Petrović, and Toni Kukoč, on the other hand, are the only World Cup MVP's inducted in both the FIBA Hall of Fame and the Naismith Memorial Basketball Hall of Fame as of 2021.

=== 1971–1978 ===
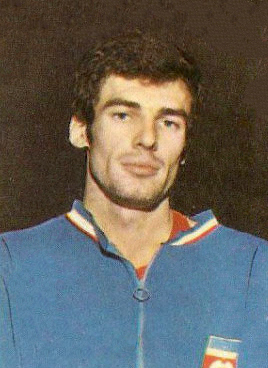
Krešimir Ćosić and Pau Gasol are the only players who were awarded the EuroBasket MVP twice.

Yugoslavia won the silver medal at EuroBasket 1971, when they were defeated 69–64 by Soviet Union. Ćosić was named EuroBasket MVP for the first time. He was the scoring leader against Italy, Bulgaria, Poland in the semifinal, and the second against Czechoslovakia, while Simonović was the scoring leader against the latter and the second against Bulgaria and Poland. Kapičić was the scoring leader against Turkey and Israel, and Knežević in the final. In 1973 they won the EuroBasket, defeating Spain in the final. One player (Ćosić) was included in the All-Tournament Team. They followed this success by winning the EuroBasket 1975, for which they were also host country. On this occasion, Ćosić was again awarded FIBA EuroBasket MVP, and to this day ties with Pau Gasol for the player with most EuroBasket MVP's. Yugoslavia were runners-up at the 1974 FIBA World Championship, won by Soviet Union. Dragan Kićanović was named MVP on this occasion. In 1977 they defeated Soviet Union 74–61 in the EuroBasket 1977 final, thus winning their third EuroBasket. Two players (Dalipagić and Slavnić) were included in the All-Tournament team.

Yugoslavia won the 1978 FIBA World Championship. They defeated Canada, South Korea, and Senegal in the Preliminary round; Soviet Union, Brazil, Italy, United States, Canada, Australia, Philippines in the Semifinal round, and Soviet Union 82–81 in the final. Delibašić tied with Dalipagić for scoring leader against Canada; Dalipagić was the scoring leader against Philippines, Italy, USA, and the Soviet Union; Kićanović against Senegal and Brazil, and Vilfan against South Korea and Australia.

Dražen Dalipagić was named MVP of the tournament, and he, Ćosić, and Kićanović were included in the All-Tournament Team.

=== 1979–1987 ===
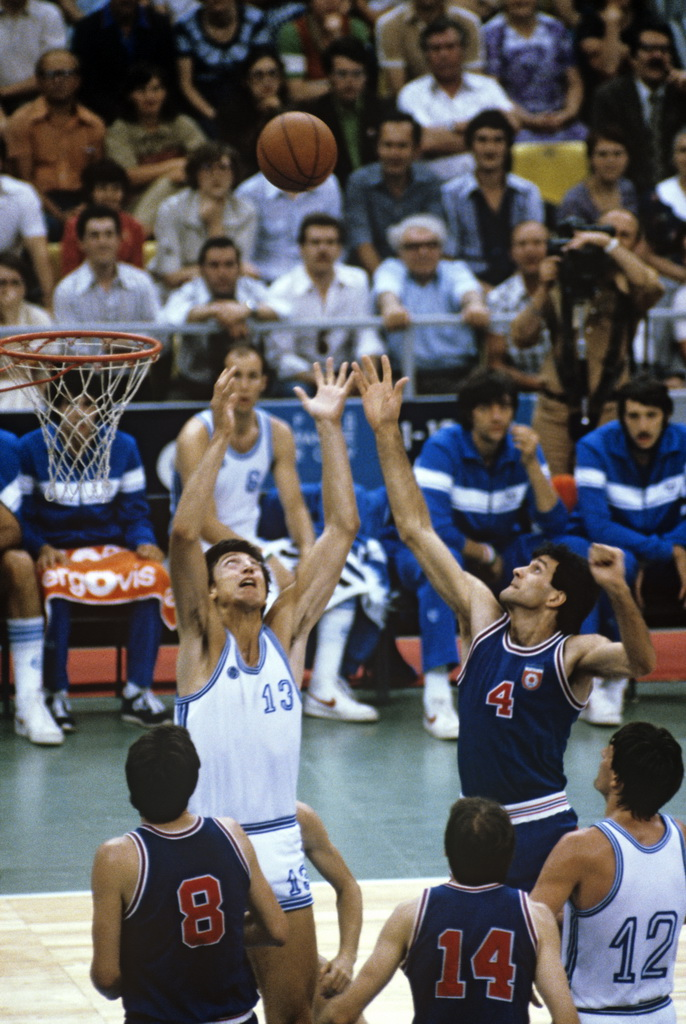
Andro Knego going up for a rebound against Italy's Renzo Vecchiato during the Olympic final in Moscow. The 1980 games was Yugoslavia's first (and only) Olympic title.

Yugoslavia won a bronze medal at EuroBasket 1979, where Ćosić and Kićanović were included in the All-Tournament Team. In 1980, Yugoslavia won their first and only Olympic gold at the 1980 Summer Olympics basketball tournament, to which the United States, as well as Argentina, Puerto Rico, Canada, and China, among others, did not participate due to the American-led boycott, thus withdrawing their national basketball teams from the tournament. Yugoslavia emerged as undefeated from both the preliminary round and the semifinal round. Dalipagić was the scoring leader against Soviet Union, and Kićanović tied with Ćosić, also the rebounding leader, for most assists. Dalipagić was the scoring leader against Brazil and tied with Ćosić for rebounding leader, while Kićanović was the scoring leader against Italy and Cuba in the semifinal round, and again against Italy in the final, won 86–77 by Yugoslavia. They were runners-up at EuroBasket 1981, losing 84–67 to the Soviet Union in the final. They won a bronze medal at the 1982 FIBA World Championship. Kićanović tied with Dalipagić for scoring leader against Czechoslovakia and Australia, and with Radovanović against Spain, and was the scoring leader against the United States and Soviet Union; Avdija against Uruguay, Delibašić against Canada, Vilfan against Colombia, and Dalipagić in the Bronze medal game won 119–117 against Spain. Dragan Kićanović was included in the All-Tournament Team. They placed third at the 1984 Summer Olympics Basketball Tournament, in which they were defeated by Spain 61–74 in semifinals. Dražen Petrović was the scoring leader against Spain. They defeated Canada 88–82 in the Bronze medal game, where Dalipagić was the scoring leader. Yugoslavia won a bronze medal at the 1986 FIBA World Championship, where they were defeated by Soviet Union in semifinals but managed to defeat Brazil and win the bronze medal game. Petrović was the tournament's MVP. They placed third at EuroBasket 1987, defeating Spain 87–98 in the Bronze medal game after they were defeated 81–77 by Greece in semifinals. Petrović was the scoring leader against both Greece and Spain.

=== 1988 Summer Olympics ===
Yugoslavia placed second at the 1988 Summer Olympics Basketball tournament. They placed first in the Group stage, losing only one game to Puerto Rico. They advanced to the knockout stage, defeating Canada 95–73 in quarterfinals and Australia 91–70 in semifinals. They lost the Gold medal game 63–76 to the Soviet Union.

=== EuroBasket 1989 ===
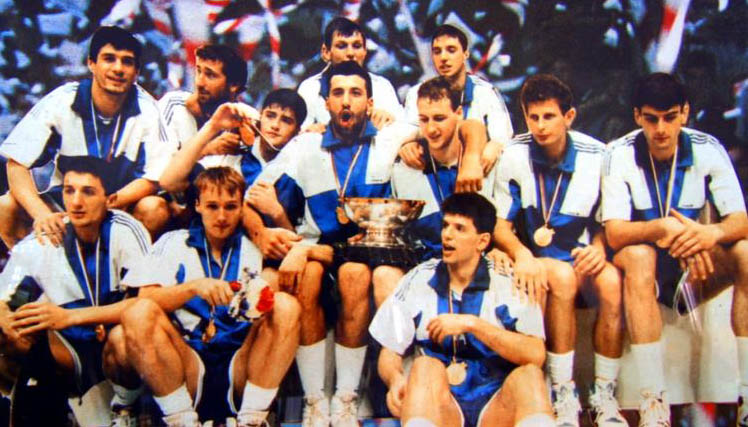
Yugoslavia team that dominantly won EuroBasket 1989 on home soil in Zagreb, a major title after nine years of failing to do so ever since the 1980 Olympics.

Yugoslavia won the 26th FIBA EuroBasket regional basketball championship, defeating Greece in the final. In the Preliminary round they were grouped with eventual runner-up Greece, France, and Bulgaria. They defeated Greece 103–68, Bulgaria 78–98, and France 89–106, thus advancing to the knockout stage as undefeated. They defeated Italy 97–80 in semifinal, and won 98–77 over Greece in the Gold medal game. In the final, Dražen Petrović was the assists leader with 12 assists, Vlade Divac was the rebounding leader with 10 rebounds, while Jure Zdovc recorded a record 8 steals with no turnovers.

=== 1990 World Championship ===
The 1990 FIBA World Championship, hosted in Argentina, was the last World Championship in which the country participated before its dissolution. In the preliminary round they placed second in Group A after Puerto Rico. They were grouped in Group A also with Venezuela, and Angola. They defeated Venezuela 92–84 in the first game, defeated Angola 92–79 in the second game, and lost 75–82 to Puerto Rico in the last game of the preliminary round.

In the second round Yugoslavia was grouped with Soviet Union, Greece and Brazil as part of Group II. They won all games, defeating Brazil 105–86, Soviet Union 100–77, and Greece 77–67.

In the Final round, Yugoslavia defeated the United States 99–91. Meanwhile, Soviet Union defeated Puerto Rico, which had been undefeated up to that point, having prevailed over the United States, Australia, host Argentina, and Yugoslavia itself.

In the final, Yugoslavia defeated Soviet Union 75–92 at the Estadio Luna Park of Buenos Aires. Jure Zdovc was the assists leader with 5 assists, and the second rebounding leader with 6 rebounds. He also scored 13 points, and was the steals leader with 4 steals. Toni Kukoč was the rebounding leader with 7 rebounds and the second assists leader with 4 assists, also scoring 14 points and stealing 2 balls. Kukoč was named MVP of the tournament. Both of them were later inducted in the FIBA Hall of Fame.

=== EuroBasket 1991 ===
EuroBasket 1991 in Italy was the last tournament in which Yugoslavia participated, as the country disintegrated in the following months. The upheaval in their home country caused disruption in the national team. Already in 1990, there had been problems between Petrović and Divac. On the day before the semifinals, Jure Zdovc was forced to leave the national team, while the airport of his hometown was bombed and Slovenia declared independence.

Yugoslavia was placed in Group A in Preliminary round, with Spain, Poland, and Bulgaria. They managed to defeat Spain 76–67, and also defeated Poland 103–61 and Bulgaria 68–89, thus gaining the group's top seed, and were set to face France in semifinals. Zdovc had to leave the national team just before the semifinal, but Yugoslavia nonetheless defeated France 76–97. In the final, they defeated host Italy 88–73. Toni Kukoč was named MVP of the tournament.

== Competitions ==
At the Summer Olympic Games, Yugoslavia captured one gold medal (1980), took the silver medal on three occasions (1968, 76, 88) and captured the bronze medal once (1984).

At the FIBA World Championship, Yugoslavia captured three gold medals (1970, 1978 and 1990), three silver medals (1963, 1967, 1974) and two bronze medals (1982, 1986).

At the EuroBasket, Yugoslavia captured the gold medal five times (1973, 1975, 1977, 1989, 1991), were silver medalists on five occasions (1961, 1965, 1969, 1971, 1981), and captured the bronze medal four times (1963, 1979, 1987).

=== Performance at Olympic Games ===
Year	Pos.	Pld	W	L
(Nazi Germany) 1936 Berlin	Did not qualify			
(United Kingdom) 1948 London	Did not qualify			
(Finland) 1952 Helsinki	Did not qualify			
(Australia) 1956 Melbourne	Did not qualify			
(Italy) 1960 Rome	6th	8	4	4
(Japan) 1964 Tokyo	7th	9	6	3
1968 Mexico City	2nd place, silver medalist(s)	9	7	2
(West Germany) 1972 Munich	5th	9	7	2
(Canada) 1976 Montreal	2nd place, silver medalist(s)	7	5	2
(Soviet Union) 1980 Moscow	1st place, gold medalist(s)	8	8	0
(United States) 1984 Los Angeles	3rd place, bronze medalist(s)	8	7	1
(South Korea) 1988 Seoul	2nd place, silver medalist(s)	8	6	2
Total	8/12	66	50	16

=== Performance at FIBA World Cup ===
Year	Pos.	Pld	W	L
1950 Argentina	10th	5	0	5
1954 Brazil	11th	5	1	4
1959 Chile	Did not qualify			
1963 Brazil	Silver medal	9	8	1
1967 Uruguay	Silver medal	9	6	3
(Socialist Federal Republic of Yugoslavia) 1970 Yugoslavia	Gold medal	6	5	1
1974 Puerto Rico	Silver medal	7	6	1
1978 Philippines	Gold medal	10	10	0
1982 Colombia	Bronze medal	9	7	2
1986 Spain	Bronze medal	10	8	2
1990 Argentina	Gold medal	8	7	1
Total	10/11	78	58	20

=== Performance at FIBA EuroBasket ===
Year	Position	Pld	W	L
1935 Switzerland	Did not qualify			
1937 Latvia	Did not qualify			
1939 Lithuania	Did not qualify			
1946 Switzerland	Did not qualify			
1947 Czechoslovakia	13th	5	2	3
1949 Egypt	Did not qualify			
1951 France	Did not qualify			
1953 Soviet Union	6th	11	6	5
1955 Hungary	8th	11	4	7
1957 Bulgaria	6th	10	4	6
1959 Turkey	9th	7	6	1
(Socialist Federal Republic of Yugoslavia) 1961 Yugoslavia	Silver medal	9	7	2
1963 Poland	Bronze medal	9	8	1
1965 Soviet Union	Silver medal	9	8	1
1967 Finland	9th	9	6	3
1969 Italy	Silver medal	7	6	1
1971 West Germany	Silver medal	7	6	1
1973 Spain	Gold medal	7	7	0
(Socialist Federal Republic of Yugoslavia) 1975 Yugoslavia	Gold medal	7	7	0
1977 Belgium	Gold medal	7	6	1
1979 Italy	Bronze medal	8	6	2
1981 Czechoslovakia	Silver medal	9	7	2
1983 France	7th	7	4	3
1985 West Germany	7th	8	5	3
1987 Greece	Bronze medal	8	5	3
(Socialist Federal Republic of Yugoslavia) 1989 Yugoslavia	Gold medal	5	5	0
1991 Italy	Gold medal	5	5	0
Total	21/27	165	120	45

== Medals table ==
Games	Gold	Silver	Bronze	Total
Summer Olympic Games
Yugoslavia	1	3	1	5
FIBA World Cup
Yugoslavia	3	3	2	8
FIBA EuroBasket
Yugoslavia	5	5	3	13
Goodwill Games
Yugoslavia	1	0	0	1
Mediterranean Games
Yugoslavia	5	1	1	7
Summer Universiade
Yugoslavia	1	2	1	4
Grand Totals	16	14	8	38

== The dominant years in FIBA competition ==
The Yugoslav national team of the late 1980s and early 1990s featured what was perhaps the greatest generation in the history of Yugoslav basketball. A common quip about basketball is: "The Americans invented it, the Yugoslavs perfected it." With such players as Dražen Petrović, Vlade Divac, Toni Kukoč, Dino Rađa, Predrag Danilović, Žarko Paspalj and Jure Zdovc the country was responsible for a wave of international NBA players in the 1990s. Many of the former Yugoslav players of this era were a part of the under-21 national team that won the FIBA World Junior Championships in 1987, defeating the U.S. both in pool play and in the final.

The 1991 team is regarded by Antonello Riva as the best team in European history.

== Rosters ==
For 1992 onwards, as Federal Republic of Yugoslavia: see Serbia and Montenegro national basketball team

== Player statistics ==
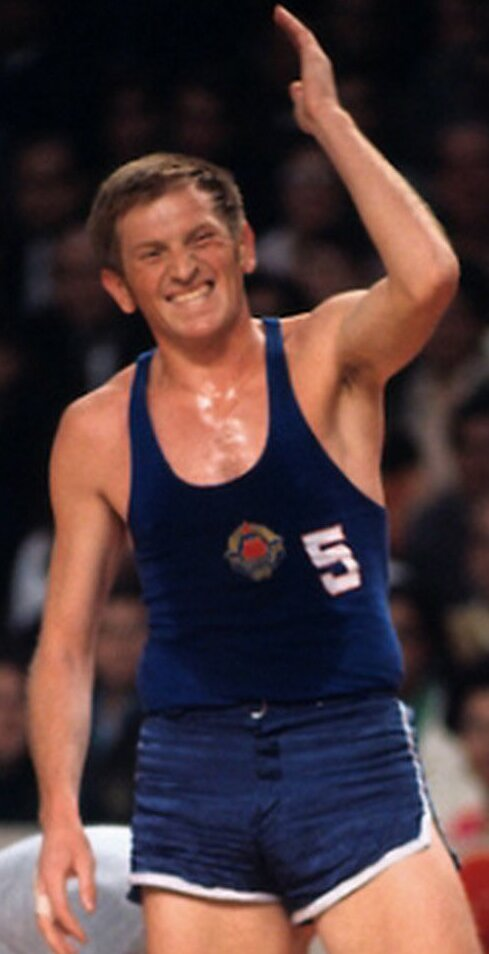
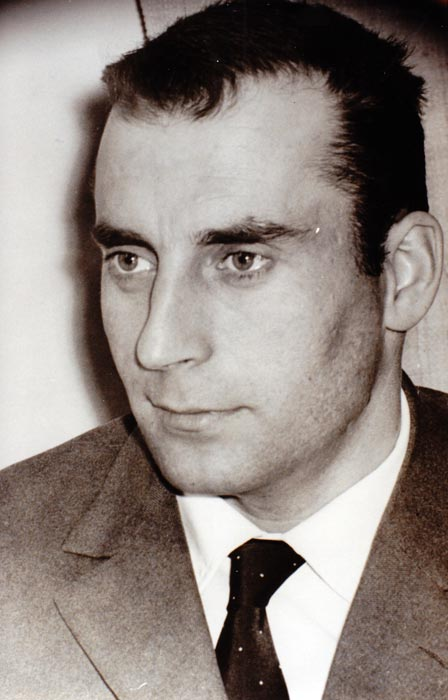
Radivoj Korać (1961 EuroBasket MVP) and Ivo Daneu (1967 World Championship MVP) were the two biggest Yugoslav basketball stars throughout the 1960s. Both made FIBA's 50 Greatest Players list in 1991.
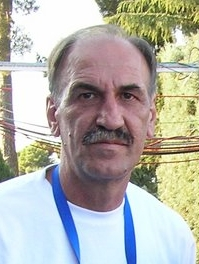
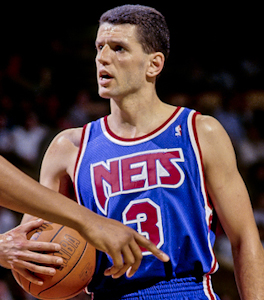
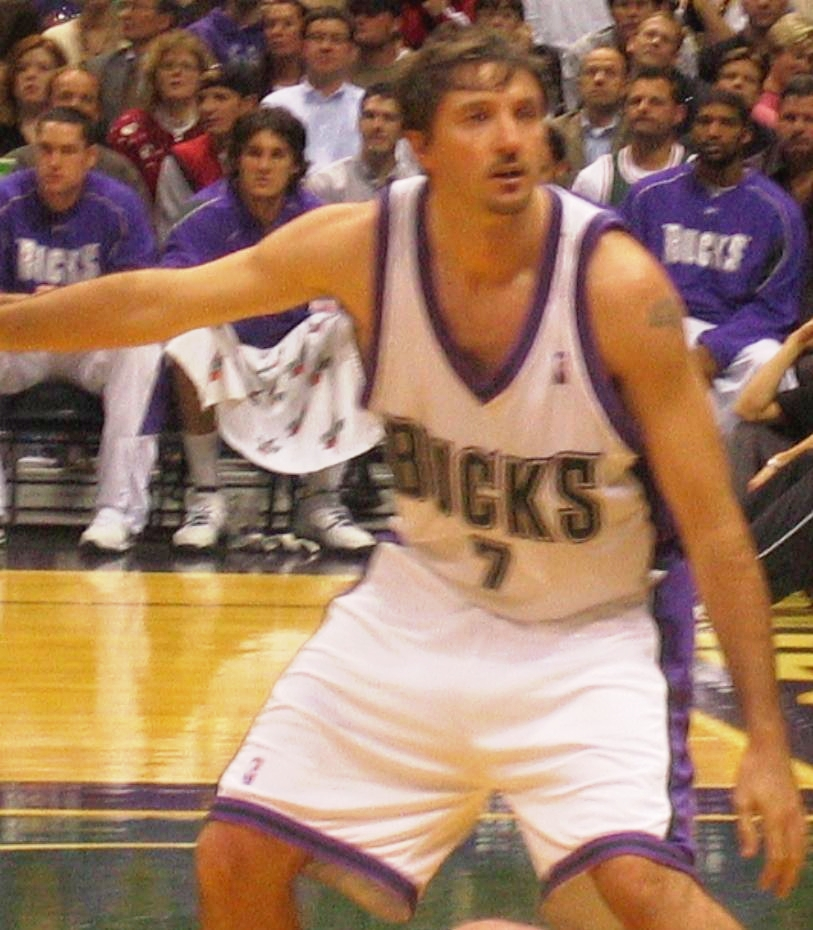
Dražen Dalipagić, Dražen Petrović, and Toni Kukoč are the three Yugoslav players to be awarded both the EuroBasket MVP and World Championship MVP honours.

=== Most appearances ===
Top 10 appearances

#	Player	Matches	Position	Years
1	Krešimir Ćosić	303	C	1967–83
2	Dražen Dalipagić	243	SF	1973–86
3	Vinko Jelovac	240	C	1969–77
4	Damir Šolman	226	SF	1967–76
5	Žarko Knežević	219	C	1970–78
6	Nikola Plećaš	215	SG	1967–75
7	Ratko Radovanović	214	C	1975–87
8	Dragan Kićanović	213	SG	1971–83
9	Ivo Daneu	209	SG	1957–70
10	Rajko Žižić	186	C	1975–84

=== Top scorers ===
Top 10 scorers

#	Player	Points
1	Dražen Dalipagić	3,700
2	Dragan Kićanović	3,330
3	Krešimir Ćosić	3,180
4	Radivoj Korać	3,107
5	Dražen Petrović	2,830
6	Vinko Jelovac	2,220
7	Ivo Daneu	2,214
8	Ratko Radovanović	2,175
9	Damir Šolman	1,798
10	Mirza Delibašić	1,759

== Notable players ==
=== Individual awards ===
==== International competitions ====
- FIBA World Cup MVP
  - Ivo Daneu – 1967
  - Ljubodrag Simonović - 1970
  - Dragan Kićanović – 1974
  - Dražen Dalipagić – 1978
  - Dražen Petrović – 1986
  - Toni Kukoč – 1990
- FIBA World Cup All-Tournament Team
  - Radivoj Korać – 1967
  - Ivo Daneu – 1967
  - Ljubodrag Simonović - 1970
  - Krešimir Ćosić – 1970, 1978
  - Vinko Jelovac – 1974
  - Dražen Dalipagić – 1978
  - Dragan Kićanović – 1978, 1982
  - Dražen Petrović – 1986
  - Vlade Divac – 1990
  - Toni Kukoč – 1990
- FIBA EuroBasket MVP
  - Radivoj Korać – 1961
  - Krešimir Ćosić – 1971, 1975
  - Dražen Dalipagić – 1977
  - Dražen Petrović – 1989
  - Toni Kukoč – 1991
- FIBA EuroBasket All-Tournament Team
  - Krešimir Ćosić – 1969, 1971, 1973, 1975, 1979
  - Ivo Daneu – 1969
  - Dražen Dalipagić – 1975, 1977, 1981
  - Dragan Kićanović – 1979, 1981
  - Dražen Petrović – 1985, 1989
  - Žarko Paspalj – 1989
  - Dino Rađa – 1989
  - Vlade Divac – 1991
  - Toni Kukoč – 1991
- FIBA EuroBasket Top Scorer
  - Radivoj Korać – 1959, 1961, 1963, 1965

==== Other notable achievements ====
- FIBA Hall of Fame
  - Radivoj Korać
  - Ivo Daneu
  - Krešimir Ćosić
  - Zoran Slavnić
  - Dražen Dalipagić
  - Dragan Kićanović
  - Mirza Delibašić
  - Dražen Petrović
  - Vlade Divac
  - Toni Kukoč
  - Jure Zdovc
- Naismith Memorial Basketball Hall of Fame
  - Krešimir Ćosić
  - Dražen Dalipagić
  - Dražen Petrović
  - Vlade Divac
  - Dino Rađa
  - Toni Kukoč
  - Radivoj Korać
- Euroscar
  - Dražen Dalipagić – 1980
  - Dragan Kićanović – 1981, 1982
  - Dražen Petrović – 1986, 1989
  - Toni Kukoč – 1990, 1991
- Mr. Europa
  - Dražen Dalipagić – 1977, 1978
  - Dragan Kićanović – 1981, 1982
  - Dražen Petrović – 1986
  - Vlade Divac – 1989
  - Toni Kukoč – 1990, 1991
- EuroLeague Final Four MVP
  - Dino Rađa – 1989
  - Toni Kukoč – 1990, 1991
- 50 Greatest EuroLeague Contributors (2008)
  - Radivoj Korać
  - Krešimir Ćosić
  - Dražen Dalipagić
  - Dragan Kićanović
  - Mirza Delibašić
  - Dražen Petrović
  - Toni Kukoč
  - Vlade Divac
  - Aleksandar Đorđević
  - Predrag Danilović

== Head coaches ==
=== Manager history ===
- 1947–1950 – Stevica Čolović
- 1950–1953 – Nebojša Popović
- 1954–1965 – Aleksandar Nikolić
- 1965–1972 – Ranko Žeravica
- 1973–1976 – Mirko Novosel
- 1977–1978 – Aleksandar Nikolić
- 1979 – Petar Skansi
- 1980 – Ranko Žeravica
- 1981 – Bogdan Tanjević
- 1982 – Ranko Žeravica
- 1983 – Josip Gjergja
- 1984 – Mirko Novosel
- 1985–1987 – Krešimir Ćosić
- 1988–1991 – Dušan Ivković

=== Individual achievements ===
- FIBA Hall of Fame
  - Krešimir Ćosić (as player)
  - Aleksandar Nikolić
  - Ranko Žeravica
  - Mirko Novosel
  - Dušan Ivković
  - Nebojša Popović (as contributor)
  - Bogdan Tanjević
- Naismith Memorial Basketball Hall of Fame
  - Krešimir Ćosić (as player)
  - Aleksandar Nikolić
  - Mirko Novosel
- EuroLeague Basketball Legend Award
  - Dušan Ivković
- 50 Greatest EuroLeague Contributors (2008)
  - Aleksandar Nikolić
  - Dušan Ivković
- EuroLeague-winning head coach
  - Aleksandar Nikolić – 1970, 1972, 1973
  - Bogdan Tanjević – 1979
  - Mirko Novosel – 1985
- Triple Crown
  - Aleksandar Nikolić – 1973
  - Mirko Novosel – 1985

== New national teams ==
After the dissolution of SFR Yugoslavia in 1992, five new countries were created: Bosnia and Herzegovina, Croatia, North Macedonia, FR Yugoslavia (in 2003, renamed to Serbia and Montenegro) and Slovenia. In 2006, Montenegro became an independent nation and Serbia became the legal successor of Serbia and Montenegro. In 2008, Kosovo declared independence from Serbia and became a FIBA member in 2015.

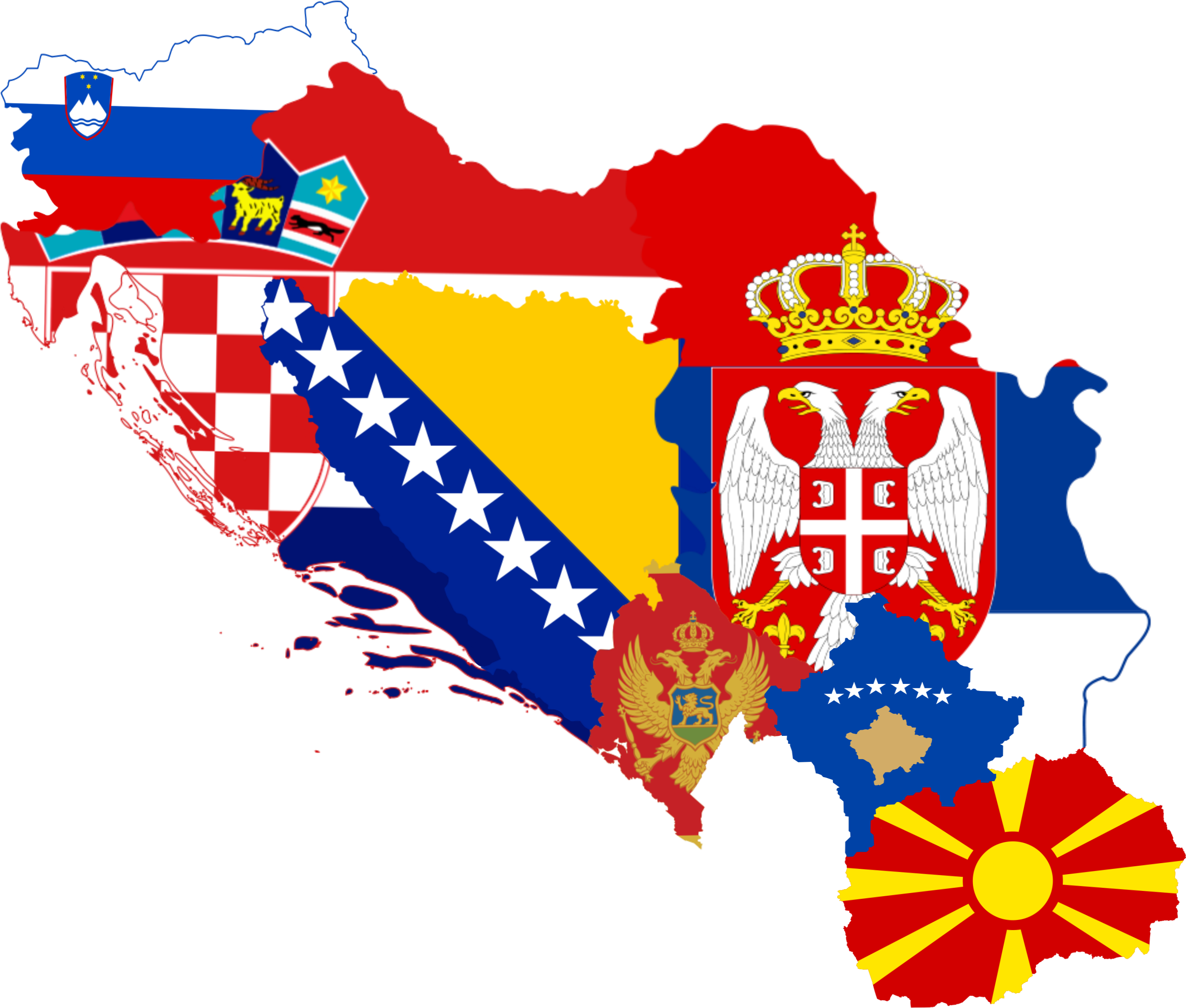

Here is a list of men's national teams on the SFR Yugoslavia area:

- Bosnia and Herzegovina (1992–present)
- Croatia (1992–present)
- North Macedonia (1991–present)
- Serbia and Montenegro (1992–2006)
  - Montenegro (2006–present)
  - Serbia (2006–present)
    - Kosovo (2015–present)
- Slovenia (1992–present)

After the breakup of Yugoslavia in 1991, clubs, leagues and national teams of the successor state basketball associations continued the so-called "Yugoslav school of basketball" tradition. Some successor states continued to produce top results and exhibited strong performances in international competitions, at both continental & world stages.

The former nation of Serbia and Montenegro and now Serbia have particularly done well since the breakup. Croatia too had some measurable success immediately after the break-up & Slovenia won their first ever international tournament after defeating Serbia at EuroBasket 2017. The other nations have also made strides in both European competitions & international tournaments, such as Montenegro & Bosnia and Herzegovina.
