= Aleksandar Kesar =

Serbian basketball coach

Fujian Sturgeons
- Position: Head coach
- League: Chinese Basketball Association

Personal information
- Born: 4 February 1972 (age 54) Belgrade, SR Serbia, SFR Yugoslavia
- Coaching career: 1999–present

Career history

Coaching
- 1999–2002: Mladost Zemun
- 2002–2007: Partizan (assistant)
- 2007–2008: Mega Aqua Monta
- 2008–2009: Ural Great Perm
- 2010–2012: Olympiacos (assistant)
- 2012: Azovmash Mariupol
- 2013–2014: Shandong Gold Lions (consultant)
- 2014–2015: Fujian Sturgeons
- 2015–2018: Shandong Golden Stars
- 2019–2020: Fujian Sturgeons
- 2021–2022: Tianjin Pioneers
- 2024–present: Fujian Sturgeons
Medals
Men's basketball
Head coach for Serbia
Summer Universiade
| Gold medal – first place | 2009 Belgrade | Team |
| Silver medal – second place | 2007 Bangkok | Team |
Assistant coach for Serbia
FIBA EuroBasket
| Silver medal – second place | 2009 Poland | Team |

Aleksandar Kesar (Serbian Cyrillic: Александар Кесар; born 4 February 1972) is a Serbian professional basketball coach for the Fujian Sturgeons of the Chinese Basketball Association (CBA).

== Coaching career ==
Kesar was an assistant coach of Partizan and Olympiacos. He was a head coach for Mega Aqua Monta, Azovmash Mariupol, Shandong Gold Lions, Fujian Sturgeons, and Tianjin Pioneers.

== National team coaching career ==
Kesar was an assistant coach of Dušan Ivković in the national team of Serbia at two FIBA EuroBaskets, 2009 in Poland and 2011 in Lithuania, and at the 2010 FIBA World Championship in Turkey. He won silver medal at EuroBasket 2009.

He led the university team of Serbia at two Summer Universiades, 2007 in Bangkok and 2009 in Belgrade. He won a gold medal at 2009 Universiade and a silver medal at 2007 Universiade.

== Career achievements and awards ==
As assistant coach

- EuroLeague champion: 1 (with Olympiacos: 2011–12)
- Serbian League champion: 1 (with Partizan: 2006–07)
- Serbian-Montenegrin League champion: 4 (with Partizan: 2002–03, 2003–04, 2004–05, 2005–06)
- Greek League champion: 1 (with Olympiacos: 2011–12)
- Adriatic League champion: 1 (with Partizan: 2006–07)
- Greek Cup winner: 1 (with Olympiacos: 2010–11)

== Personal life ==
Aleksandar is married. He and his wife, Ana, have two daughters, Klara and Atina.
