= Bojan Krstović =

Serbian basketball player

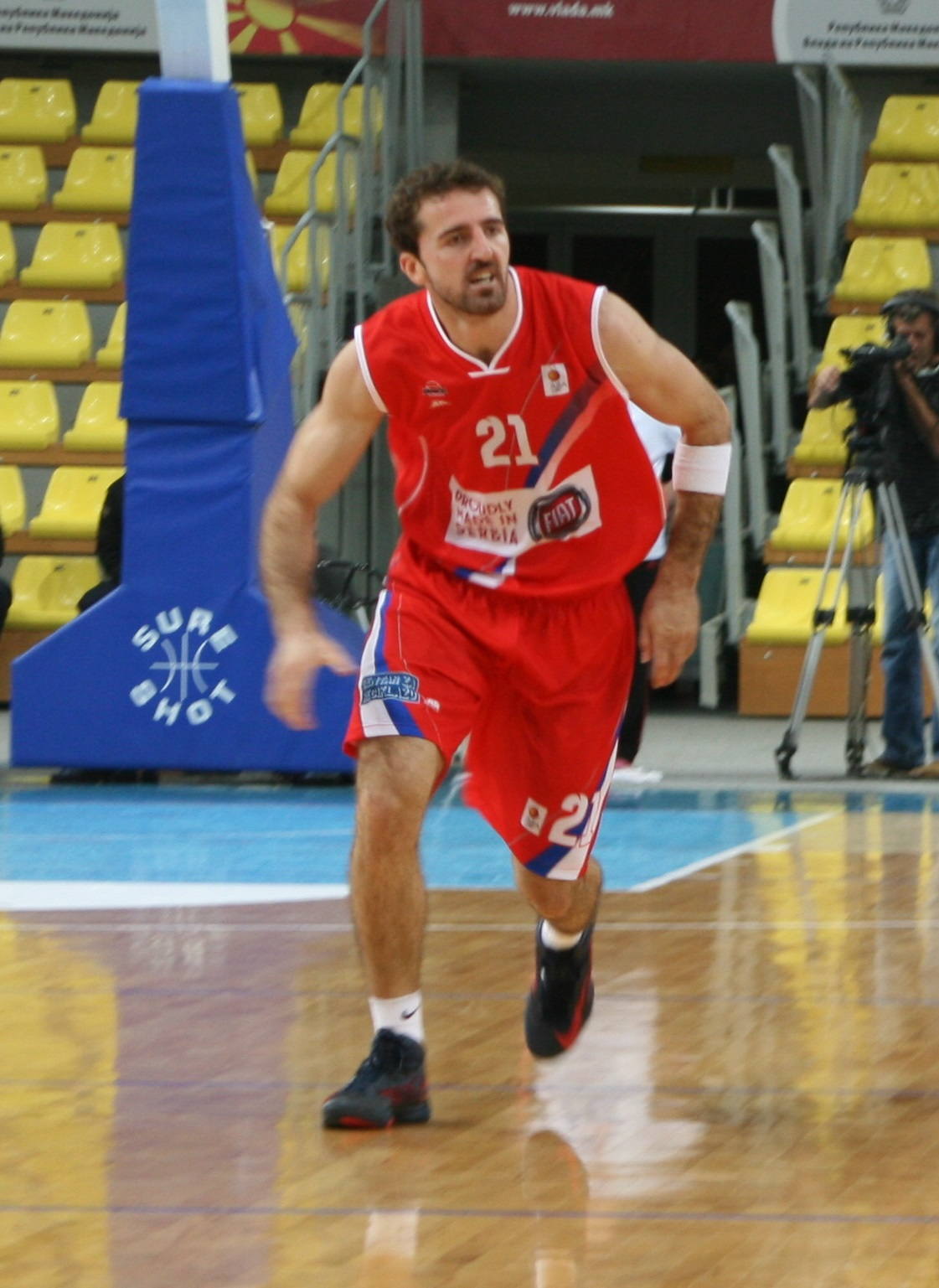
- Krstović with Radnicki in October 2012

Free agent
- Position: Shooting guard

Personal information
- Born: November 1, 1980 (age 46) Goraždevac, SFR Yugoslavia
- Listed height: 1.94 m (6 ft 4 in)
- Listed weight: 86 kg (190 lb)

Career information
- NBA draft: 2002: undrafted
- Playing career: 2001–2019

Career history
- 2001–2003: Borac Čačak
- 2003–2008: FMP Železnik
- 2008–2011: Hemofarm
- 2011–2012: Budućnost Podgorica
- 2012–2013: Radnički Kragujevac
- 2013–2014: Blu Basket 1971
- 2015–2016: Dynamic
- 2016–2017: Vršac
- 2017–2018: Metalac Valjevo
- 2018–2019: Tamiš
- 2019–2020: Kragujevački Radnički

Career highlights
- 2× Adriatic League champion (2004, 2006); 2× Serbian Cup winner (2005, 2007); Montenegrin League champion (2012); Montenegrin Cup winner (2012)

Bojan Krstović (born November 1, 1980) is a Serbian professional basketball player who last played for Kragujevački Radnički. He is a 1.94 m (6 ft 4 in) tall shooting guard.

== Professional career ==
He began playing basketball at the age of 15 in KK Buducnost Peć. His professional career began in KK Borac Čačak, where he spent two seasons (2001–02, 2002–03). From there he opened the door to FMP Železnik. With a team from the Belgrade for five years (2003–2008) won all his trophies - 2004 and 2006 the first place in the Adriatic League, in 2005 and 2007 Kup Radivoja Koraća. In 2008 signed with Hemofarm where he stayed till 2011 when he signed with KK Budućnost Podgorica. In August 2012, he signed with Radnički Kragujevac.

== Serbian national team ==
Krstović was a member of the university Serbia and Montenegro national team at Universiade 2003 and there he won a gold medal.
