= Ivan Zoroski =

Serbian basketball player

Personal information
- Born: July 24, 1979 (age 47) Belgrade, SFR Yugoslavia
- Listed height: 6 ft 5 3/4 in (1.97 m)
- Listed weight: 205 lb (93 kg)

Career information
- NBA draft: 2001: undrafted
- Playing career: 2000–2013
- Position: Point guard / shooting guard

Career history
- 2000–2004: FMP Železnik
- 2004–2005: Olympiacos
- 2005: Spirou Charleroi
- 2005–2006: Dynamo Moscow Region
- 2006–2007: Valladolid
- 2007–2010: Panionios
- 2010–2011: Teramo Basket
- 2011–2012: Sutor Montegranaro
- 2012–2013: Umana Reyer Venezia

Career highlights
- Adriatic League champion (2004); Serbian Cup winner (2003)
Medals
Men's basketball
Representing FR Yugoslavia
Universiade
Gold medal – first place	2001 Beijing	Team

Ivan Zoroski (Serbian: Иван Зороски, born on July 24, 1979) is a retired Serbian professional basketball player. Standing at 1.97 m (6 ft 5 3/4 in) he played at the point guard and shooting guard positions.

== Professional career ==
In his professional career Zoroski has played for the following clubs: FMP Železnik of the Adriatic League (2000–04), the big Greek Euroleague club Olympiacos Piraeus (2004–05), Dynamo Moscow Region of the Russian Superleague A (2005–06), the Belgian League club Spirou Charleroi (2006), Valladolid of the Spanish ACB League (2006–07), the Greek A1 League club Panionios (2007–10), and the Italian League clubs Teramo Basket, Sutor Montegranaro and Umana Reyer Venezia.

== National team career ==
Zoroski played with the junior national team of Yugoslavia and he won the gold medal at the 2001 World University Games.
