= List of Montenegrin NBA players =

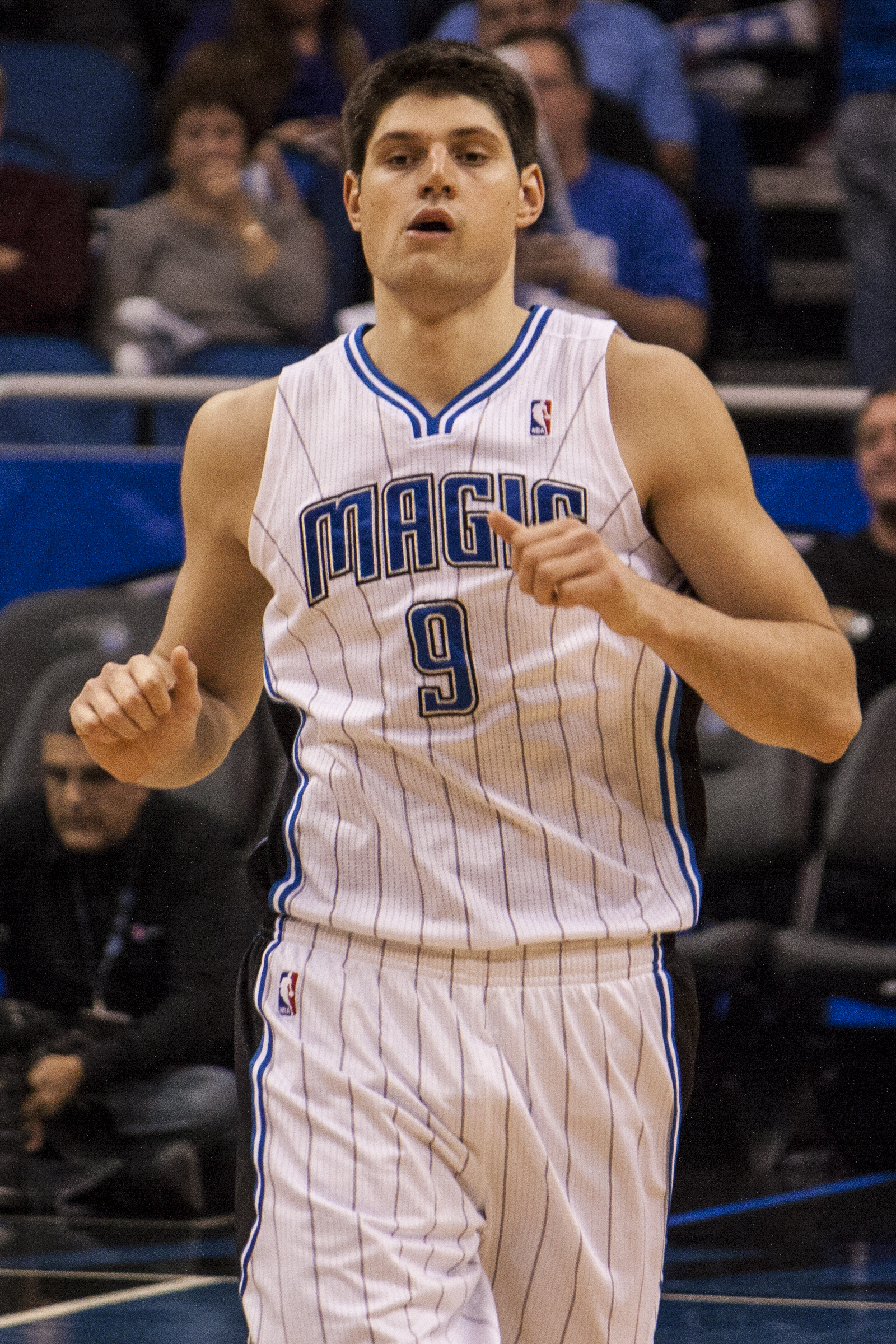
Nikola Vučević and Javonte Green are currently the only Montenegrins in the NBA.

The following is a list of Montenegrin players in the National Basketball Association (NBA). The list also includes players who were born outside of Montenegro but have represented Montenegro national team.

== Key ==
Pos.	G	F	C
Position	Guard	Forward	Center

*	Denotes player who is still active in the NBA

== Players ==
Note: Statistics are correct as of September 01, 2017.

Player	Pos.	Team(s) played	Career^{[a]}	Regular season	Playoffs	Year (pick)	Team	Notes	Ref.
Player	Pos.	Team(s) played	Career^{[a]}	Games played		NBA draft		Notes	Ref.
Žarko Čabarkapa	F	Phoenix Suns; Golden State Warriors	2003–2005; 2005–2006	150	—	2003 (17th)	Phoenix Suns	Born in Serbia, SFR Yugoslavia,^{[b]} represented FR Yugoslavia and Serbia and Montenegro internationally	
Predrag Drobnjak	C	Seattle SuperSonics; Los Angeles Clippers; Atlanta Hawks	2001–2003; 2003–2004; 2004–2005	278	3	1997 (48th)	Washington Bullets	Born in Montenegro, SFR Yugoslavia,^{[b]} represented FR Yugoslavia, Serbia and Montenegro, and Montenegro internationally	
Nikola Peković*	C	Minnesota Timberwolves	2010–2017	271	—	2008 (31st)	Minnesota Timberwolves	Born in Montenegro, SFR Yugoslavia,^{[b]} represented Serbia and Montenegro and Montenegro internationally	
Nikola Vučević	C-F	Philadelphia 76ers Orlando Magic Chicago Bulls Boston Celtics	2011–2021 2021–present	399	1	2011 (16th)	Philadelphia 76ers	Born in Morges, Switzerland, represents Montenegro internationally	
Slavko Vraneš	C	Portland Trail Blazers	2004	1	—	2003 (39th)	New York Knicks	Born in Montenegro, SFR Yugoslavia,^{[b]} represents Montenegro internationally	
Nikola Mirotić	F	Chicago Bulls	2014–2019	218	17	2011 (23rd)	Houston Rockets	Born in Montenegro, SFR Yugoslavia,^{[b]} Montenegrin-Spanish, represents Spain internationally.	
Predrag Savovic	SG	Denver Nuggets	2002–2004	29	0	2002 (not drafted)	Denver Nuggets	Born in Croatia, SFR Yugoslavia,^{[b]} Montenegrin-Spanish, represents Montenegro internationally.	
Omar Cook	SG	Portland Trail Blazers Toronto Raptors	2004 2005	92	0	2001 NBA draft (32nd)	Orlando Magic	Born in United States, naturalised 2008, represents Montenegro internationally	

== Drafted but never played ==
Player	Pos.	Year (pick)	Team	Notes	Ref.
Player	Pos.	NBA draft		Notes	Ref.
Bojan Dubljević	PF/C	2013 (59th)	Minnesota Timberwolves	Born in Montenegro, SFR Yugoslavia,^{[b]} represented FR Yugoslavia and Serbia and Montenegro	
Mladen Šekularac	G/F	2002 (54th)	Dallas Mavericks	Born in Montenegro, SFR Yugoslavia,^{[b]} represented FR Yugoslavia and Serbia and Montenegro	
Marko Todorović	PF/C	2013 (45th)	Portland Trail Blazers	Born in Montenegro, SFR Yugoslavia,^{[b]} represented FR Yugoslavia and Serbia and Montenegro	

== Notes ==
- ^{a} Each year is linked to an article about that particular NBA season.
- ^{b} Socialist Federal Republic of Yugoslavia dissolved in 1992 into five independent countries, Bosnia and Herzegovina, Croatia, Macedonia, Slovenia, and the Federal Republic of Yugoslavia. FR Yugoslavia was renamed into Serbia and Montenegro in February 2003 and dissolved into two independent countries, Montenegro and Serbia, in June 2006.

== See also ==
- List of foreign NBA players
