= Basketball Federation of Yugoslavia =

Sports governing body in Yugoslavia

- Sport: Basketball
- Jurisdiction: SFR Yugoslavia
- Abbreviation: KSJ
- Founded: 12 December 1948
- Affiliation: FIBA
- Affiliation date: 1949
- Headquarters: Belgrade
- Closure date: 1991
- (Socialist Federal Republic of Yugoslavia)

The Basketball Federation of Yugoslavia (Serbo-Croatian: Košarkaški savez Jugoslavije, Кошаркашки савез Југославије; Slovene: Košarkarska zveza Jugoslavije; Macedonian: Кошаркарска федерација на Југославија) was a non-profit organization and the national sports governing body for basketball in Socialist Federal Republic of Yugoslavia. Until 1991, the organization has represented SFR Yugoslavia in FIBA and the men's and women's national basketball teams in the Yugoslav Olympic Committee.

After the dissolution of SFR Yugoslavia in 1992, the successor countries all set up their national federations, while the Federal republic of Yugoslavia kept the National Federation until the dissolution of the State Union of Serbia & Montenegro in 2006.

== Competitions ==
Men's

- 1st-tier league: Yugoslav First Federal Basketball League
- 2nd-tier league: Yugoslav 1. B Federal Basketball League
- Cup tournament: Yugoslav Basketball Cup

Women's

- 1st-tier league: Yugoslav Women's Basketball League
- Cup tournament: Yugoslav Women's Basketball Cup

== National teams ==
Men's

- Yugoslavia men's national basketball team
- Yugoslavia men's national under-19 basketball team
- Yugoslavia men's national under-18 basketball team
- Yugoslavia men's national under-16 basketball team
- Yugoslavia men's university basketball team

Women's

- Yugoslavia women's national basketball team
- Yugoslavia women's national under-19 basketball team
- Yugoslavia women's national under-18 basketball team
- Yugoslavia women's national under-16 basketball team
- Yugoslavia women's university basketball team

== Separate national federations ==
After the dissolution of SFR Yugoslavia in 1991, five new countries were created: Bosnia and Herzegovina, Croatia, Macedonia, FR Yugoslavia (in 2003, renamed to Serbia and Montenegro) and Slovenia.

Country	Association	Founded
Bosnia and Herzegovina	Basketball Federation of Bosnia and Herzegovina	1992
Croatia	Croatian Basketball Federation	1991
Serbia and Montenegro	Basketball Federation of Serbia and Montenegro	1992
Macedonia	Basketball Federation of Macedonia	1992
Slovenia	Basketball Federation of Slovenia	1991

== List of presidents ==
- Ivan Popović (1948–1949)
- Milojko Drulović (1949–1950)
- Danilo Knežević (1950–1965)
- Radomir Šaper (1965–1973)
- Radoslav Savić (1973–1977)
- Vladimir Pezo (1977–1980)
- Božina Ćulafić (1980–1981)
- Mehmet Dobërçani (1981–1982)
- Vasil Tupurkovski (1982–1983)
- Petar Breznik (1983–1985)
- Nebojša Popović (1985–1987)
- Miodrag Babić (1987–1989)
- Uglješa Uzelac (1989–1991)

== See also ==
- Yugoslav basketball clubs in European competitions
- Adriatic League
