= Dušan Ivković =

Serbian basketball player and coach (1943–2021)

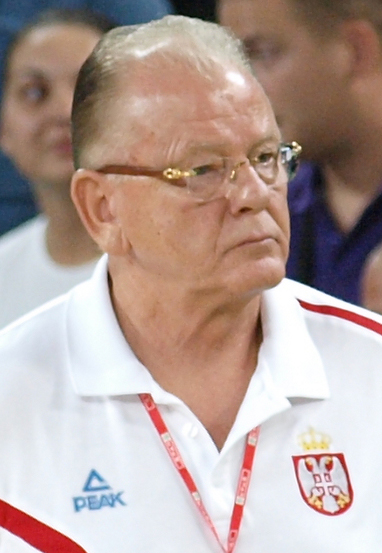
- Ivković coaching Serbia in 2011

Personal information
- Born: 29 October 1943 Belgrade, German-occupied Serbia
- Died: 16 September 2021 (aged 77) Belgrade, Serbia
- Listed height: 188 cm (6 ft 2 in)
- Listed weight: 90 kg (198 lb)

Career information
- Playing career: 1958–1968
- Position: Point guard
- Coaching career: 1968–2016

Career history

Playing
- 1958–1968: Radnički Belgrade

Coaching
- 1968–1977: Radnički Belgrade (youth)
- 1977–1978: Partizan (assistant)
- 1978–1980: Partizan
- 1980–1982: Aris
- 1982–1984: Radnički Belgrade
- 1984–1987: Šibenka
- 1987–1990: Vojvodina
- 1988–1991: Yugoslavia
- 1992–1995: FR Yugoslavia
- 1991–1993: PAOK
- 1994–1996: Panionios
- 1996–1999: Olympiacos
- 1999–2001: AEK Athens
- 2002–2005: CSKA Moscow
- 2005–2007: Dynamo Moscow
- 2008–2013: Serbia
- 2010–2012: Olympiacos
- 2014–2016: Anadolu Efes

Career highlights
- As head coach: 2× EuroLeague champion (1997, 2012); European Triple Crown winner (1997); European Small Triple Crown winner (1979); ULEB Cup champion (2006); FIBA Saporta Cup champion (2000); FIBA Korać Cup champion (1979); 3× Greek League champion (1992, 1997, 2012); 3× Russian League champion (2003–2005); Yugoslav League champion (1979); First B Federal League champion (1988); 4× Greek Cup winner (1997, 2000, 2001, 2011); Russian Cup winner (2005); Yugoslav Cup winner (1979); Turkish Cup winner (2015); Turkish Super Cup winner (2015); FIBA Hall of Fame (2019); FIBA European Coach of the Year (1997); 2× FIBA EuroStar (1996, 1997); EuroLeague Coach of the Year (2012); Russian League Coach of the Year (2004); 2× Greek League Coach of the Year (1997, 2012); All-Greek Sport's Coach of the Year (2012); Greek League Hall of Fame (2022); 50 Greatest EuroLeague Contributors (2008); EuroLeague Legend (2017); Piva Ivković Award for Lifetime Achievement (1998); As assistant coach: FIBA Korać Cup champion (1978)
- FIBA Hall of Fame
Medals
Men's basketball
Head coach for Yugoslavia
Summer Olympic Games
Silver medal – second place	1988 Seoul
FIBA Basketball World Cup
Gold medal – first place	1990 Argentina
FIBA EuroBasket
Gold medal – first place	1989 Yugoslavia
Gold medal – first place	1991 Italy
Goodwill Games
Gold medal – first place	1990 Seattle
Summer Universiade
Gold medal – first place	1987 Zagreb
Silver medal – second place	1983 Edmonton
Head coach for FR Yugoslavia
FIBA EuroBasket
Gold medal – first place	1995 Greece
Head coach for Serbia
FIBA EuroBasket
Silver medal – second place	2009 Poland

Dušan "Duda" Ivković (Serbian Cyrillic: Душан "Дуда" Ивковић; 29 October 1943 – 16 September 2021) was a Serbian professional basketball player and coach. He served as head coach of the senior Serbian national basketball team from 2007 to 2013, and of the senior Yugoslavian national basketball team, from 1987 (Serbia and Montenegro competed as the FR Yugoslavia national team following the breakup of Yugoslavia) to 1995. He was also the president of the Serbian club BKK Radnički.

In 2008, he was named one of the 50 Greatest EuroLeague Contributors. He was elected to the FIBA Hall of Fame in 2017. He was also named a EuroLeague Basketball Legend in 2017.

== Playing career ==
A point guard, Ivković played 10 seasons of club basketball in Yugoslavia, from 1958 to 1968. He spent his entire club playing career with Radnički Belgrade. He retired as a player in 1968, and then joined Radnički Belgrade's youth system as a head coach.

== Club coaching career ==
=== Radnički youth system ===
After retirement in 1968, Ivković joined the youth system of Radnički Belgrade, as their junior head coach. In his third season with the club, 1973–74, he led the junior team to the Yugoslav Junior Championship title.

=== KK Partizan ===
In 1977, he became an assistant coach for Partizan, working under the club's head coach at the time, Ranko Žeravica. In 1978, Ivković got promoted to be Partizan's head coach, a position that he held for two years. With Partizan, he won the first trophies in his club coaching career. In the 1978–79 season, he won the European Small Triple Crown with Partizan, as he won the Yugoslav Championship, the Yugoslav Cup title, and the FIBA Korać Cup championship, all in the same season. Prior to that, Partizan had won only one major trophy (one Yugoslav Championship) in its history, and 1979 was thus a birth-year of what eventually would become the most successful club in Serbian basketball history.

=== Aris ===
In 1980, Ivković left Partizan to join Greek side Aris, where he also stayed for two seasons.

=== Return to Radnički ===
After that, he returned to Radnički Belgrade, where he had previously spent his entire playing career.

=== Šibenka ===
He then had a three-year stint with Šibenka.

=== KK Vojvodina ===
After that, Ivković spent two seasons with Vojvodina.

=== PAOK ===
Ivković returned to Greece in 1990, when he took over P.A.O.K., to which he brought the second and last Greek League championship in the club's history, in 1992.

=== Panionios ===
After three years on the black-and-white bench, he moved to Athens-based Panionios.

=== Olympiacos ===
In 1996, Ivkovic moved to Olympiacos. With Olympiacos, in the 1996–97 season, he brought the Red-Whites to their first European Triple Crown title. Olympiacos won that season's championship of the FIBA EuroLeague, at the 1997 FIBA EuroLeague Final Four, and also in that same season, the club won the Greek Basket League championship and the Greek Cup title.

=== AEK ===
After three years at Olympiacos, Ivković took over the city rival AEK, and he brought them the 2000 FIBA Saporta Cup championship.

=== CSKA Moscow ===
Ivković moved from Greece to Russia, in the summer of 2002, when he came to CSKA Moscow, a club with a great tradition. He took over their head coaching job and also the club's basketball operations, at the same time. In the next three years, the Russian club reached the EuroLeague Final Four three times, won all three Russian Championships, and also one Russian Cup title.

=== Dynamo Moscow ===
From there, he moved to Moscow's second largest club in 2005, Dynamo Moscow, for two seasons, where he won the 2006 ULEB Cup championship. In the summer of 2007, Ivković decided to take a break from his club coaching career, and he was without a club for three years.

=== Return to Olympiacos ===
He then returned to Olympiacos in 2010. With Olympiacos, he won the Greek Cup title in 2011, and also the 2012 the EuroLeague championship, at the 2012 EuroLeague Final Four. Olympiacos came back to win the EuroLeague championship, after they trailed CSKA Moscow by 19 points in the third quarter. They won the EuroLeague championship with a buzzer-beater basket by Georgios Printezis, from an assist by Vassilis Spanoulis, in the last seconds of the EuroLeague Final. Ivković also won the 2012 Greek League's championship, with Olympiacos a few weeks later, before leaving the team, after his contract expired at the end of the season. He was named the Best Sports Coach in Greece for 2012.

=== Efes ===
In 2014, Ivković signed a two-year contract with the Turkish Super League team Anadolu Efes, with him starting to coach the club in the 2014–15 season. On 1 July 2016, Ivković officially retired from professional coaching.

== National team coaching ==
=== Assisting Luka Stančić with Yugoslavia's national junior (under-18) and cadet (under-16) teams ===
Success with the Radnički Belgrade youth teams led to Ivković being recommended for the Yugoslav junior national team coaching staff. So, for the 1976 European Championship for Juniors, in Santiago de Compostela, 32-year-old coach Ivković was named assistant to the more experienced head coach Luka Stančić. The Yugoslav juniors, led by Aco Petrović, Miško Marić, and Predrag Bogosavljev, won gold by beating the Soviet Union 92–83 in the final.

After the 1976 success, Ivković continued his assistant job under head coach Stančić, within the Yugoslav national team's youth system; in addition to assisting Stančić on the junior (under-18) national team, Ivković also assisted him in the cadet (under-16) national team. He would stay at the job until 1980, winning three medals at the European Championships in the process: two silver medals at the 1977 Championship for Cadets and the 1980 Championship for Juniors, as well as a bronze medal at the 1978 Championship for Juniors. Ivković kept doing the youth national team's assistant job, even after being named to the high profile position of KK Partizan's head coach in 1978, and winning the "European Small Triple Crown" with the club, in 1979.

=== Yugoslavia university team head coach and assisting Krešo Ćosić with the Yugoslavia national team ===
In summer 1983, already with some experience as a head coach — featuring хигх’профиле appointments at KK Partizan and Aris—the Radnički Belgrade head coach Ivković was simultaneously named head coach of the Yugoslavia university team, with the upcoming Universiade in Edmonton being his first order of business. With a roster featuring the 18-year-old Šibenka player Dražen Petrović, the team won silver after losing to Canada in the final.

At the 1986 FIBA World Championship in Spain, Ivković was an assistant coach for the Yugoslavia national team under head coach Krešimir Ćosić. Featuring the still only 21-year-old but already established and dominant European player Dražen Petrović, who had just led his club side Cibona to their second straight EuroLeague title, the Yugoslavian team disappointingly only got bronze after losing to the Soviet Union in the semifinals despite being up by 9 points with 53 seconds left in the game.

Ivković also assisted Ćosić the following summer at EuroBasket 1987 where Yugoslavia again, somewhat disappointingly, got bronze. Barely three weeks after assisting Ćosić at EuroBasket 1987, Ivković was again the head coach of the Yugoslavian university team, this time at the Universiade at home in Zagreb. The team, featuring now 22-year-old European superstar Petrović, won gold in dominant fashion.

=== Head coach ===
In 1988, Ivković succeeded Ćosić as the head coach of the senior men's Yugoslavian national team, and he held the post until the breakup of Yugoslavia, in 1991.

Ivković then assumed the head coaching position of the senior men's FR Yugoslavian national team. He guided the FR Yugoslavia national team to a gold medal at the 1995 EuroBasket, in the country's first official appearance since the UN lifted sanctions against FR Yugoslavia. At the following 1997 EuroBasket tournament, Željko Obradović took over as the team's head coach, while Ivković assumed the role of team manager. Both Obradović and Ivković remained in their posts, until they jointly resigned in November 2000, following a sixth-place finish at the 2000 Summer Olympics.

Ivković became the head coach of the senior men's Serbian national team in early 2008. He took over that position from Zoran Slavnić, who had finished in dead last place with Serbia, at the 2007 EuroBasket, and whom had also failed to qualify for the 2008 Summer Olympics. Ivković's first order of business was getting Serbia to qualify for the next EuroBasket, through the qualification rounds, which he was successful at. At the 2009 EuroBasket, he led Serbia to the final, where they lost to Spain, and finished the tournament with a silver medal.

Following that, Ivković led Serbia to a fourth place finish at the 2010 FIBA World Championship. In April 2011, he agreed to work pro bono, for the remainder of his contract with the Serbian national team. Ivković then led Serbia to an 8th place finish at the 2011 EuroBasket, which meant that Serbia failed to qualify for the 2012 Summer Olympics.

Ivković's final order of business as Serbia's head coach, was leading them at the 2013 EuroBasket. At the tournament, he led Serbia to a 7th place finish, which meant that Serbia had qualified to play at the 2014 FIBA World Cup. Ivković resigned from the position of Serbian national team head coach, on 24 September 2013, citing the need for the national team to be led by someone that was younger than him.

== Personal life ==
Ivković's elder brother Slobodan "Piva" Ivković, was also a famous basketball player and coach. Ivković earned a degree from the University of Belgrade Mining and Geology Faculty. Ivković was related to the famous Serbian-American scientist Nikola Tesla. Ivković's maternal grandmother, Olga Mandić, and Tesla were first cousins. Coincidentally, Tesla died the same year that Ivković was born.

Ivković was a record-holding pigeon racer. Ivković died on 16 September 2021, in Belgrade. He was buried at the Belgrade New Cemetery, on 21 September 2021. The funeral service was attended by numerous active and retired basketball players and coaches, including: Vlade Divac, Dragan Kićanović, Vassilis Spanoulis, Dimitris Itoudis, Žarko Paspalj, Željko Obradović, Predrag Danilović, Dino Rađa, Jure Zdovc, and others.

== Career achievements ==
=== Titles won ===
- European Triple Winner: 1997 (with Olympiacos Piraeus)
- European Small Triple Winner: 1979 (with Partizan)
- 2× EuroLeague Champion: 1997, 2012 (with Olympiacos Piraeus)
- ULEB Cup Champion: 2006 (with Dynamo Moscow)
- FIBA Saporta Cup Champion: 2000 (with AEK Athens)
- FIBA Korać Cup Champion: 1979 (with Partizan)
- 3× Greek League Champion: 1992 (with PAOK), 1997, 2012 (with Olympiacos Piraeus)
- 3× Russian League Champion: 2003, 2004, 2005 (with CSKA Moscow)
- Yugoslav League Champion: 1979 (with Partizan)
- First B Federal League Champion: 1988 (with Vojvodina)
- Yugoslav Cup Winner: 1979 with (Partizan)
- 4× Greek Cup Winner: 1997, 2011 (with Olympiacos Piraeus), 2000, 2001 (with AEK Athens)
- Russian Cup Winner: 2005 (with CSKA Moscow)
- Turkish Cup Winner: 2015 (with Anadolu Efes)
- Turkish Super Cup Winner: 2015 (with Anadolu Efes)

=== Senior national team career ===
==== As a head coach ====
- 1990 World Cup: Gold
- 1989 EuroBasket: Gold
- 1991 EuroBasket: Gold
- 1995 EuroBasket: Gold
- 1987 Summer Universiade: Gold
- 1983 Summer Universiade: Silver
- 1988 Summer Olympics: Silver
- 2009 EuroBasket: Silver

=== Other honors ===
- McDonald's Championship Finalist: 1997 (with Olympiacos Piraeus)
- 7× EuroLeague Final Four Participation: 1993 (with PAOK), 2003, 2004, 2005 (with CSKA Moscow), 1997, 1999, 2012 (with Olympiacos Piraeus)
- EuroLeague Semifinalist: 2001 (with AEK Athens)
- FIBA Saporta Cup Final Finalist: 1992 (with PAOK)
- FIBA Korać Cup Final Finalist: 1983 (with Šibenik)
- 2× Turkish Super League Finalist: 2015, 2016 (with Anadolu Efes)
- 3× Greek League Finalist: 1982 (with Aris), 1999, 2011 (with Olympiacos Piraeus)
- Yugoslav League Finalist: 1983 (with Šibenik)
- 2× Russian Cup Finalist: 2003, 2004 (with CSKA Moscow)
- 2× Greek Cup Finalist: 1995 (with Panionios), 2012 (with Olympiacos Piraeus)
- Turkish Super Cup Finalist: 2016 (with Anadolu Efes)

=== Individual awards and accomplishments ===
- FIBA Hall of Fame: 2019
- FIBA European Coach of the Year: 1997
- 50 Greatest EuroLeague Contributors: 2008
- EuroLeague Legend: 2017
- EuroLeague Coach of the Year: 2012
- Eurobasket News All-Europe Coach of the Year: 2012
- 2× FIBA EuroStar: 1996, 1997
- Piva Ivković Award for Lifetime Achievement: 1998
- All-Greek Sport's Coach of the Year: 2012
- Greek League Hall of Fame: 2022
- 2× Greek League Coach of the Year: 1997, 2012
- Russian League Coach of the Year: 2004

=== As an assistant coach ===
- 1976 FIBA Europe Under-18 Championship: Gold
- 1977 FIBA Europe Under-16 Championship: Silver
- 1978 FIBA Europe Under-18 Championship: Bronze
- 1980 FIBA Europe Under-18 Championship: Silver
- 1986 FIBA World Championship: Bronze
- 1987 EuroBasket: Bronze
- 1996 Summer Olympics: Silver
- 1997 EuroBasket: Gold
- 1998 FIBA World Championship: Gold

== See also ==
- FIBA Basketball World Cup winning head coaches
- List of EuroCup-winning head coaches
- List of EuroLeague-winning head coaches
- List of FIBA EuroBasket winning head coaches
