= Basketball at the 1977 Summer Universiade =

International sporting competition

Basketball at the IX Summer Universiade

The Basketball competitions in the 1977 Summer Universiade were held in Sofia, Bulgaria. The United States beat the Soviet Union in the final in the men's tournament, but was beaten in the women's competition.

== Format ==
In the men's tournament, 31 participants were divided into 7 groups of four teams and one group of three. They played a single round-robin match and the winners advanced to the second round and the others to the classification round. In the second round, two groups of four teams played round-robin matches and the top two teams of each group advanced to the semi-final. In the classification round, five groups of four teams and one group of three played round-robin matches and then advanced to the placement semi-finals and finals.

== Men's competition ==
=== First round ===
- Group A

18 August

Soviet Union	111–62	Mexico

- Group B
- Group C
- Group D

18 August

Canada	71–43	Greece

21 August

Canada	79–59	Hungary

- Group E

18 August

United States	136–57	Belgium

18 August

Poland	136–20	Kuwait

19 August

United States	131–45	Kuwait

19 August

Canada	102–33	Syria

20 August

United States	91–63	Poland

=== Second round ===
- Group A (1st - 8th)

Pos	Team	Pld	W	L	PF	PA	PD	Pts	Qualification
1	United States	3	3	0	0	0	0	6	Semifinals
2	Soviet Union	3	2	1	0	0	0	5	Semifinals
3	Cuba	3	1	2	0	0	0	4	5th-8th classification round
4	Brazil	3	0	3	0	0	0	3	5th-8th classification round

Rules for classification: 1) points; 2) head-to-head points; 3) head-to-head goal average; 4) head-to-head number of points scored.

Pos	Team	Pld	W	L	PF	PA	PD	Pts	Qualification
1	Canada	3	3	0	0	0	0	6	Semifinals
2	Czechoslovakia	3	2	1	0	0	0	5	Semifinals
3	Spain	3	1	2	0	0	0	4	5th-8th classification round
4	Bulgaria	3	0	3	0	0	0	3	5th-8th classification round

Rules for classification: 1) points; 2) head-to-head points; 3) head-to-head goal average; 4) head-to-head number of points scored.
- Group B (9th - 16th)

Pos	Team	Pld	W	L	PF	PA	PD	Pts	Qualification
1	Poland	3	3	0	0	0	0	6	9th-12th classification round
2	Mexico	3	2	1	0	0	0	5	9th-12th classification round
3	West Germany	3	1	2	0	0	0	4	13th-16th classification round
4	France	3	0	3	0	0	0	3	13th-16th classification round

Rules for classification: 1) points; 2) head-to-head points; 3) head-to-head goal average; 4) head-to-head number of points scored.

Pos	Team	Pld	W	L	PF	PA	PD	Pts	Qualification
1	Yugoslavia	3	3	0	0	0	0	6	9th-12th classification round
2	Hungary	3	2	1	0	0	0	5	9th-12th classification round
3	Italy	3	1	2	0	0	0	4	13th-16th classification round
4	Netherlands	3	0	3	0	0	0	3	13th-16th classification round

Rules for classification: 1) points; 2) head-to-head points; 3) head-to-head goal average; 4) head-to-head number of points scored.
- Group C (17th - 24th)

Pos	Team	Pld	W	L	PF	PA	PD	Pts	Qualification
1	Senegal	3	3	0	0	0	0	6	17th-20th classification round
2	Greece	3	2	1	0	0	0	5	17th-20th classification round
3	Great Britain	3	1	2	0	0	0	4	21st-24th classification round
4	Congo	3	0	3	0	0	0	3	21st-24th classification round

Rules for classification: 1) points; 2) head-to-head points; 3) head-to-head goal average; 4) head-to-head number of points scored.

Pos	Team	Pld	W	L	PF	PA	PD	Pts	Qualification
1	Turkey	3	3	0	0	0	0	6	17th-20th classification round
2	Israel	3	2	1	0	0	0	5	17th-20th classification round
3	Japan	3	1	2	0	0	0	4	21st-24th classification round
4	Belgium	3	0	3	0	0	0	3	21st-24th classification round

Rules for classification: 1) points; 2) head-to-head points; 3) head-to-head goal average; 4) head-to-head number of points scored.
- Group D (25th - 31st)

Pos	Team	Pld	W	L	PF	PA	PD	Pts	Qualification
1	Central African Republic	3	3	0	0	0	0	6	25th-28th classification round
2	Denmark	3	2	1	0	0	0	5	25th-28th classification round
3	Kuwait	3	1	2	0	0	0	4	29th-31st classification round
4	[[ men's national basketball team|]]	3	0	3	0	0	0	3	29th-31st classification round

Rules for classification: 1) points; 2) head-to-head points; 3) head-to-head goal average; 4) head-to-head number of points scored.

Pos	Team	Pld	W	L	PF	PA	PD	Pts	Qualification
1	Egypt	3	3	0	0	0	0	6	25th-28th classification round
2	Sudan	3	2	1	0	0	0	5	25th-28th classification round
3	Syria	3	1	2	0	0	0	4	29th-31st classification round
4	Iraq	3	0	3	0	0	0	3	29th-31st classification round

Rules for classification: 1) points; 2) head-to-head points; 3) head-to-head goal average; 4) head-to-head number of points scored.

Group 1 (1st - 8th)

22 August

Cuba	88–44	Brazil

22 August

United States	129–95	Soviet Union

Group 2 (9th - 16th)

22 August

Poland	94–79	Mexico

22 August

Yugoslavia	87–71	Netherlands

Group 3 (17th - 24th)

22 August

Greece	105–89	Congo

Group 1 (1st - 8th)

23 August

United States	94–78	Cuba

Group 2 (9th - 16th)

23 August

Poland	116–73	France

Group 3 (17th - 24th)

23 August

Greece	76–60	Great Britain

Group 1 (1st - 8th)

24 August

United States	103–81	Brazil

24 August

Canada	70–61	Spain

Group 2 (9th - 16th)

24 August

Poland	78–69	West Germany

24 August

Mexico	86–84 (OT)	France

Group 3 (17th - 24th)

24 August

Israel	105–70	Belgium

=== Semi-finals ===
==== Group A ====
- 1st - 4th

26 August

United States	85–69	Czechoslovakia

26 August

Soviet Union	73–68	Canada

- 5th - 8th

26 August

Spain	83–80	Brazil

26 August

Cuba	67–58	Bulgaria

==== Group B ====
- 9th - 12th

26 August

Poland	71–47	Hungary

26 August

Mexico	64–62	Yugoslavia

- 13th - 16th

26 August

Italy	94–76	France

26? August

Netherlands	?–?	West Germany

==== Group C ====
- 17th - 20th

26 August

Israel	82–61	Senegal

26 August

Turkey	87–77	Greece

- 21st - 24th

26 August

Japan	89–77	Congo

26 August

Belgium	69–61	Great Britain

==== Group D ====
- 25th - 28th

26 August

Egypt	70–52	Denmark

26 August

Central African Republic	69–52	Sudan

- 29th -

26 August

Iraq	68–32	Kuwait

=== Finals ===
Gold medal match

27 August

United States	87–68	Soviet Union

Third-place match

27 August

Czechoslovakia	74–67	Canada

Fifth-place match

27 August

Cuba	100–87	Spain

- 7th place match

27 August

Brazil	87–85	Bulgaria

- 9th place match

27 August

Mexico	59–57	Poland

- 11th place match

27 August

Yugoslavia	94–58	Hungary

- 13th place match

27 August

Italy	82–63	Netherlands

- 15th place match

27 August

West Germany	74–67	France

- 17th place match

27 August

Israel	70–61	Turkey

- 19th place match

27 August

Greece	63–56	Senegal

- 21st place match

27 August

Japan	51–43	Belgium

- 23rd place match

27 August

Congo	54–50	Great Britain

- 25th place match

27 August

Egypt	79–70	Central African Republic

- 27th place match

27 August

Sudan	66–63	Denmark

=== Final standings ===
Rank	Team	Record
1	United States	8–0
2	Soviet Union	6–2
3	Czechoslovakia	6–2
4	Canada	6–2
5	Cuba	5–2
6	Spain	5–3
7	Brazil	4-4
8	Bulgaria	3–5
9	Mexico	6–2
10	Poland	6–2
11	Yugoslavia	5–2
12	Hungary	4-4
13	Italy	5–3
14	Netherlands	3–5
15	West Germany	3-3
16	France	1–6
17	Israel	5–3
18	Turkey	5–3
19	Greece	4-4
20	Senegal	4-4
21	Japan	3–4
22	Belgium	2–6
23	Congo	2–6
24	Great Britain	2–6
25	Egypt	5-3
26	Central African Republic	5-3
27	Zambia	3-4
28	Sudan	2-5
29	Denmark	1-5
30	Iraq	2-6
31	Syria	1-6
32		

== Women's competition ==
=== Preliminary round ===
- Group A

18 August

United States	76–66	Hungary

18 August

China	67–62	West Germany

19 August

China	75–57	Mexico

- Group B
- Group C

19 August

Bulgaria	76–64	Canada

19 August

Canada	65–58	France

19 August

Yugoslavia	66–37	Denmark

21 August

Canada	80–52	Poland

- Group D

=== Second round ===
- semifinals

23 August

Soviet Union	104–67	China

23 August

Poland	86–48	Denmark

24 August

Soviet Union	104–78	United States

=== Semifinals ===
==== Group A ====
- 1st - 4th

26 August

United States	87–84	Bulgaria

26 August

Soviet Union	93–45	Cuba

- 5th - 8th

26 August

China	85–74	Yugoslavia

26? August

Canada	Win–Loss	Romania

==== Group B ====
- 9th - 12th

26 August

Poland	64–51	Hungary

26 August

Italy	Win–Loss	Czechoslovakia

- 13th - 16th

=== Finals ===
- Gold medal match

27 August

Soviet Union	107–90	United States

- Bronze medal match

27 August

Bulgaria	60–49	Cuba

- 5th place match

27 August

China	56–54	Canada

- 7th place match

27 August

Romania	63–44	Yugoslavia

- 9th place match

27 August

Poland	71–69	Italy

- 11th place match

27 August

Czechoslovakia	70–57	Hungary

- 13th place match

27 August

West Germany	51–49	Japan

- 15th place match

27 August

France	43–42	Denmark

=== Final standings ===
Rank	Team	Record
1	Soviet Union	7–0
2	United States	6–2
3	Bulgaria	5–2
4	Cuba	4–3
5	China	5–3
6	Canada	3–4
7	Romania	3–4
8	Yugoslavia	3–4
9	Poland	4–3
10	Italy	4–3
11	Czechoslovakia	6–1
12	Hungary	3–5
13	West Germany	4-4
14	Japan	3–5
15	France	3-3
16	Denmark	1–6
