= Basketball at the 1965 Summer Universiade =

Basketball at the IV Summer Universiade

The Basketball competitions in the 1965 Summer Universiade were held in Budapest, Hungary.

== Men's competition ==
=== Final standings ===
1. United States
2. Soviet Union
3. Hungary

== Women's competition ==
=== Final standings ===
1. Soviet Union
2. Czechoslovakia
3. Hungary
