= Basketball at the 1985 Summer Universiade =

Basketball events were contested at the 1985 Summer Universiade in Kobe, Japan.

Event	Gold	Silver	Bronze
Men's basketball	Soviet Union (URS)	United States (USA)	Canada (CAN)
Women's basketball	Soviet Union (URS)	United States (USA)	Yugoslavia (YUG)
