= Basketball at the 1973 Summer Universiade =

Basketball at the VII Summer Universiade

The Basketball competitions in the 1973 Summer Universiade were held in Moscow, Soviet Union.

== Men's competition ==
The American national team was coached by Ed Badger while the Mexican national team was coached by Gene Iba, Jerry Hale, and Agustín García, and also practiced under Charlie Spoonhour in the leadup to the games.

The United States defeated the Soviet Union, 75–67, in the gold-medal game. The Soviet roster featured six players who participated in the 1972 Olympic men's basketball final.

=== Final standings ===
1. United States
2. Soviet Union
3. Brazil

== Women's competition ==
=== Final standings ===
1. Soviet Union
2. United States
3. South Korea
