= Basketball at the 1993 Summer Universiade =

Basketball events were contested at the 1993 Summer Universiade in Buffalo, New York, USA.

Event	Gold	Silver	Bronze
Men's	United States (USA)	Canada (CAN)	China (CHN)
Women's	China (CHN)	Cuba (CUB)	United States (USA)
