= Basketball at the 1963 Summer Universiade =

Basketball at the III Summer Universiade

The Basketball competition in the 1963 Summer Universiade was held in Porto Alegre, Brazil.

== Men's competition ==
=== Final standings ===
1. Brazil
2. Cuba
3. Peru
