= Basketball at the 1970 Summer Universiade =

1970 Basketball competition

Basketball at the VI Summer Universiade

The Basketball competitions in the 1970 Summer Universiade were held in Turin, Italy.

== Men's competition ==
=== Final standings ===
1. Soviet Union
2. United States
3. Cuba
4. Yugoslavia
5. Italy
6. Bulgaria
7. Brazil
8. South Korea

==== Rosters ====
1. Soviet Union:

Aleksandar Belov
Sergey Belov
Aleksandar Boloshev
Ivan Edeshko
Valeriy Fedorov
Leonid Ivanov
Evgueniy Kovanko
Anatoly Krikun
Modestas Paulauskas
Pritt Tomson
Aleksandar Bolsakov
Alzhan Zarmuhamedov

2. United States:

Jim McDaniels
George McGinnis
John Mengelt
Ken Davis
Cliff Meely
Bob Ford
Jim Cleamons
Jake Jones
Tom Parker
Dave Smith
Dave Robisch
Dana Lewis

3. Cuba:

Jose Miguel Alvarez
Miguel Calderon
Rafael Canizares
Pedro Chappe
Juan Domecq
Ruperto Herrera
Tomas Herrera
Alejandro Ortiz
Conrado Perez
Franklin Standard
Oscar Varona
Alejandro Urgelles

4. Yugoslavia:

Karati
Simonovic
Jrlovac
Knezevic
Biziak
Kapicic
Kotarac
Rukavina
Solman
Georgijevski
Cermack

5. Italy:

Giomo
De Rossi
Bisson
Cosmelli
Zanatta
Meneghin
Ossola
Viola
Farina
Quercia
Bovone
Coen

6. Bulgaria:

N. Todorov
E. Filipov
Sachenikov
Atanasov
Doikov
Yankov
Atanas Golomeev
Barzakov
Boycho Branzov
Raichev
Petko Marinov

7. Brazil:

Pereira
Pedrigno
Corre
Scarpini
Garcia
Nello
Ranieri
Abdala
Chebel
Sebba
Ludolf
Dietrich

8. South Korea:

Shin Dong Pa
Hi Hyung
Ja Young
Hqz Jack
Dong Won
Sung Hwan
Dong Yang
Kwang Joon
Kankho Suk
Kyung Denk
Jai Hwan
Kil Ho

== Women's competition ==
=== Final standings ===
1. Soviet Union
2. Czechoslovakia
3. Cuba
4. Bulgaria
5. Romania
6. Cuba
