= Basketball at the 1989 Summer Universiade =

Basketball event was contested for men only at the 1989 Summer Universiade in Duisburg, West Germany.

Event	Gold	Silver	Bronze
Men's basketball	United States (USA)	Soviet Union (URS)	West Germany (FRG)
