= Basketball at the 1967 Summer Universiade =

Basketball at the V Summer Universiade

The Basketball competitions in the 1967 Summer Universiade were held in Tokyo, Japan, from August 28 to September 3, 1967.

== Men's competition ==
=== Final standings ===
1. United States
2. South Korea
3. Brazil
4. Japan
5. Philippines
6. Belgium
7. Thailand
8. Hong Kong

== Women's competition ==
=== Final standings ===
1. South Korea
2. Japan
3. France
