= Basketball at the 2005 Summer Universiade =

Basketball at the XXIII Summer Universiade
- Venue: various

The Basketball competitions in the 2005 Summer Universiade were held in İzmir, Turkey.

== Men's competition ==
=== Final standings ===
1. United States
2. Ukraine
3. Serbia and Montenegro

== Women's competition ==
=== Final standings ===
1. United States
2. Serbia and Montenegro
3. Australia
