= Basketball at the 1991 Summer Universiade =

Basketball events were contested at the 1991 Summer Universiade in Sheffield, England.

Event	Gold	Silver	Bronze
Men's basketball	United States (USA)	Canada (CAN)	Soviet Union (URS)
Women's basketball	United States (USA)	Spain (ESP)	Canada (CAN)
