= Basketball at the 1979 Summer Universiade =

Basketball at the X Summer Universiade

The Basketball competitions in the 1979 Summer Universiade were held in Mexico City, Mexico.

== Men's competition ==
=== Final standings and results ===
| 1. USA (7-1) | 9. Brazil (6-2) |
| 2. Yugoslavia (6-2) | 10. Israel (6-2) |
| 3. Cuba (6-2) | 11. Japan (5-3) |
| 4. Mexico (5-2) | 12. Panama (3-5) |
| 5. Canada (5-3) | 13. Finland (5-3) |
| 6. Bulgaria (4-4) | 14. Congo (3-5) |
| 7. F. R. of Germany (5-3) | 15. Liberia (3-5) |
| 8. Belgium (3-5) | 16. Jordan (2-6) |

1. United States
2. Yugoslavia
3. Cuba

== Women's competition ==
=== Final standings and results ===
| 1. United States; (7-0) | 5. Soviet Union; (5-2) |
| 2. Cuba (5-3) | 6. Poland (5-2) |
| 3. Canada (4-3) | 7. Yugoslavia (2-5) |
| 4. Bulgaria (5-3) | 8. Mexico (1-6) |

1. United States
2. Cuba
3. Canada
