= Basketball at the 1981 Summer Universiade =

Basketball at the XI Summer Universiade

The Basketball competitions in the 1981 Summer Universiade were held in Bucharest, Romania.

== Men's competition ==
=== Final standings ===
1. United States
2. Soviet Union
3. Yugoslavia

== Women's competition ==
=== Final standings ===
1. Soviet Union
2. United States
3. Romania
