= Basketball at the 1959 Summer Universiade =

Basketball at the I Summer Universiade

The Basketball competition in the 1959 Summer Universiade was held in Turin, Italy. Only men's event was held.

== Men's competition ==
=== Final standings ===
1. Soviet Union
2. Italy
3. Czechoslovakia
4. Hungary
