= Basketball at the 2003 Summer Universiade =

Basketball at the XXII Summer Universiade
- Venue: various

The Basketball competitions in the 2003 Summer Universiade were held in Daegu, South Korea.

== Men's competition ==
=== Final standings ===
1. Serbia and Montenegro
2. Russia
3. Canada

== Women's competition ==
=== Final standings ===
1. China
2. Italy
3. Russia
