= Basketball at the 1987 Summer Universiade =

Basketball events were contested at the 1987 Summer Universiade in Zagreb, Yugoslavia.

Event	Gold	Silver	Bronze
Men's basketball	Yugoslavia (YUG)	United States (USA)	Spain (ESP)
Women's basketball	Yugoslavia (YUG)	Soviet Union (URS)	China (CHN)
