= Basketball at the 2007 Summer Universiade =

Basketball at the XXIV Summer Universiade
- Venue: various

The Basketball competition in the 2007 Summer Universiade were held on different venues in Bangkok, Thailand between 7–10 August 2007 and 12–18 August 2007.

== Men's competition ==
=== Draw ===
Twenty-four (24) teams participated in the men's competition, drawn to eight groups of three. USA Basketball did not send a team to the event; instead, the University of Northern Iowa sent its team to compete under the country's banner.

=== Preliminary round (group stage) ===
Qualified for the quarterfinals group I–IV
Qualified for the quarterfinals group V–VI

Group A

Team	Pts.	W	L	PCT
Canada	4	2	0	1.000
New Zealand	3	1	1	5.000
Thailand	2	0	2	0.000

Group B

Team	Pts.	W	L	PCT
Lithuania	4	2	0	1.000
(United States) USA	3	1	1	0.500
Angola	2	0	1	0.000

Group C

Team	Pts.	W	L	PCT
Japan	4	2	0	1.000
Ukraine	3	1	1	5.000
Brazil	2	0	2	0.000

Group D

Team	Pts.	W	L	PCT
Serbia	4	2	0	1.000
Mexico	3	1	1	0.500
Czech Republic	2	0	2	0.000

Group E

Team	Pts.	W	L	PCT
Russia	4	2	0	1.000
Finland	3	1	1	0.500
Chinese Taipei	2	0	2	0.000

Group F

Team	Pts.	W	L	PCT
Germany	4	2	0	1.000
Greece	3	1	1	5.000
Kazakhstan	2	0	2	0.000

Group G

Team	Pts.	W	L	PCT
Turkey	4	2	0	1.000
China	3	1	1	0.500
South Africa	2	0	2	0.000

Group H

Team	Pts.	W	L	PCT
Israel	4	2	0	1.000
South Korea	3	1	1	5.000
Australia	2	0	2	0.000

=== Second phase (classification) ===
The top two teams in each group were placed into four (4) separate groups, and played another round-robin within the group. (Teams from Groups A & H formed Group I, B & G: Group J, C & F: Group K, and the remaining: Group L). The last place teams in groups A, C, E & H formed consolation Group M, the rest Group N, and also played another round-robin within.

The top two teams in the upper groups advanced to the quarterfinals. The others played teams with the same rank to determine 9th through 16th places. The top two teams in the lower groups played for the 17-20th places, and the rest for 21st-24th places.

==== Upper groups (groups I–L) ====
Qualified for the championship contention
Classification 9-16

Group I

Team	Pts.	W	L	PCT	Tiebreak	
Team	Pts.	W	L	PCT	GF	GA
Canada	5	2	1	0.667	236	198
South Korea	5	2	1	0.667	232	214
Israel	5	2	1	0.667	222	242
New Zealand	3	0	3	0.000		

Group J

Team	Pts.	W	L	PCT	Tiebreak	
Team	Pts.	W	L	PCT	GF	GA
Lithuania	5	2	1	0.667	311	226
Turkey	5	2	1	0.667	262	249
(United States) USA	5	2	1	0.667	238	213
China	3	0	3	0.000		

Group K

Team	Pts.	W	L	PCT
Japan	6	3	0	1.000
Germany	5	2	1	0.667
Greece	4	1	2	0.333
Ukraine	3	0	3	0.000

Group L

Team	Pts.	W	L	PCT
Serbia	6	3	0	1.000
Russia	5	2	1	0.667
Finland	4	1	2	0.333
Mexico	3	0	3	0.000

==== Lower groups (groups M & N) ====
Classification 17-20
Classification 21-24

Group I

Team	Pts.	W	L	PCT
Brazil	6	3	0	1.000
Chinese Taipei	5	2	1	0.667
Thailand	4	1	2	0.333
South Africa	3	0	3	0.000

Group N

Team	Pts.	W	L	PCT	Tiebreak	
Team	Pts.	W	L	PCT	GF	GA
Australia	5	2	1	0.667	238	178
Czech Republic	5	2	1	0.667	214	156
Kazakhstan	5	2	1	0.667	188	206
Angola	3	0	3	0.000		

=== Finals ===
Lithuanian team became the winner of the games, defeating Serbia in the final 85–66.

== Women's competition ==
The gold medal in the women's competition was won by Australia. After dropping the opening game of the tournament, the Australians won five straight games, culminating in defeating Russia 85–65 in the gold medal game on 16 August.
