= Basketball at the 1999 Summer Universiade =

Basketball events were contested at the 1999 Summer Universiade in Palma de Mallorca, Spain.

Event	Gold	Silver	Bronze
Men's basketball	United States (USA)	Yugoslavia (YUG)	Spain (ESP)
Women's basketball	Spain (ESP)	United States (USA)	Russia (RUS)
