= Basketball at the 2001 Summer Universiade =

The Basketball competitions in the 2001 Summer Universiade were held in Beijing, China.

== Medalists ==
Event	Gold	Silver	Bronze
Men	Yugoslavia	China	United States
Women	United States	China	Czech Republic
