= 2004 United States men's Olympic basketball team =

- Head coach: Larry Brown
- Scoring leader: (United States) Allen Iverson 13.8
- Rebounding leader: (United States) Tim Duncan 9.1
- Assists leader: (United States) Stephon Marbury 3.4

The men's national basketball team of the United States competed at the 2004 Summer Olympics in Athens, Greece. The team was led by future Basketball Hall of Fame head coach Larry Brown.

The Americans were favored to win the gold medal, after winning the previous three tournaments. However, the team won only bronze, while losing three games against its opponents, the most games ever lost by a U.S. men's Olympic basketball team. This was the second time that Team USA won the bronze medal, having also done so at the 1988 Summer Olympics in Seoul.

Team USA lost its opening game to Puerto Rico by 19 points, which stands as the largest margin of defeat for the U.S. in the Olympics. It ended their 24-game Olympic winning streak since 1992, when National Basketball Association (NBA) players were first allowed to compete. The team also lost a group stage game to Lithuania and the semi-final game to Argentina. In addition, the U.S. lost a friendly preparation game prior to the Olympics, against Italy, by a score of 95–78.

== Roster ==
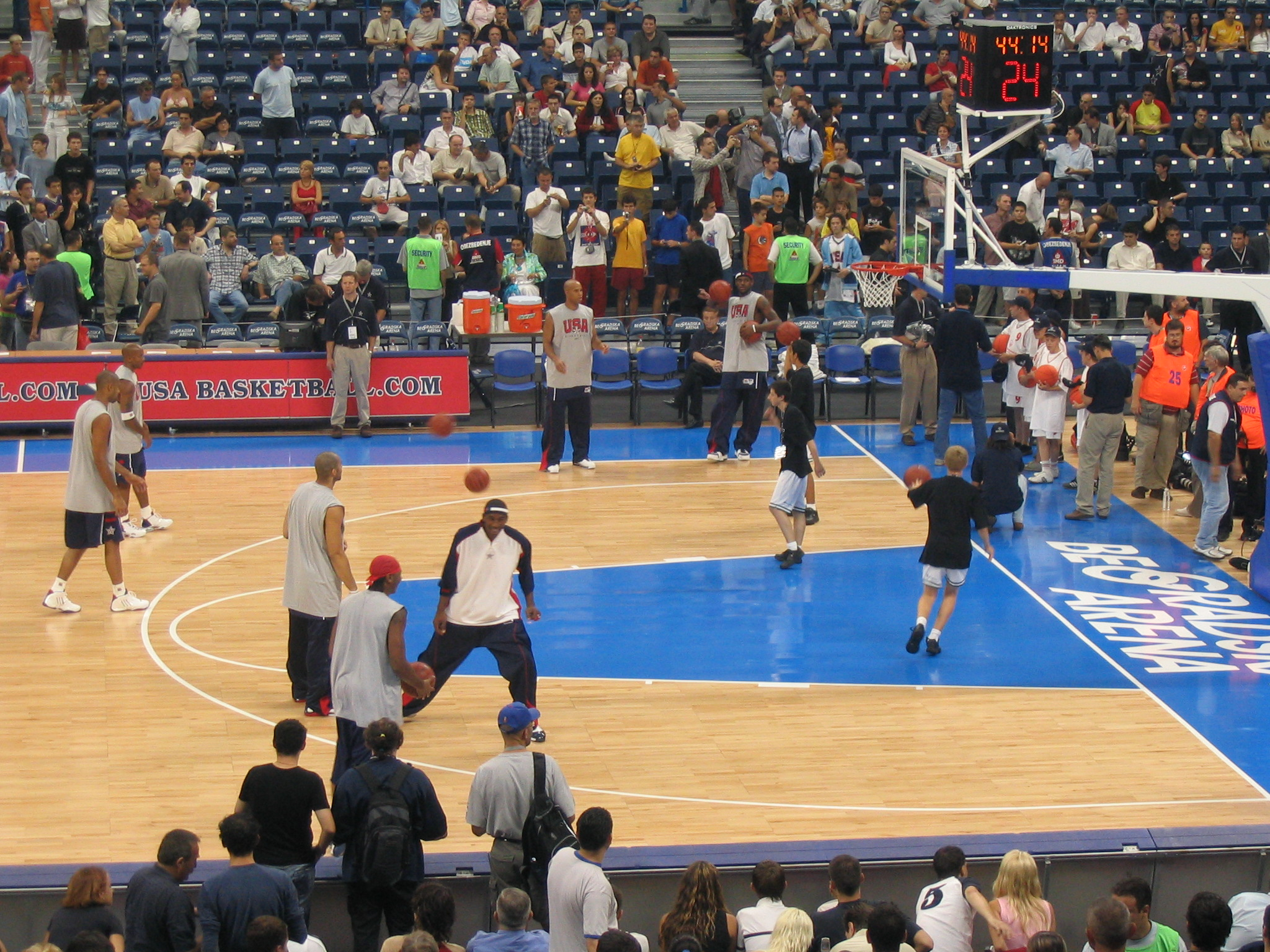
Team USA members warming up at Belgrade Arena before their preparation game versus Serbia and Montenegro in August 2004.

The following is the United States roster in the men's basketball tournament of the 2004 Summer Olympics.

United States men's national basketball team – 2004 Summer Olympics roster
Players
Coaches

| Pos. | No. | Name | Age – Date of birth | Height | Club | Ctr. |
|---|---|---|---|---|---|---|
| G | 4 | Allen Iverson (C) | 29 – 7 June 1975 | 1.82 m (6 ft 0 in) | Philadelphia 76ers | (United States) |
| G | 5 | Stephon Marbury | 27 – 20 February 1977 | 1.87 m (6 ft 2 in) | New York Knicks | (United States) |
| G | 6 | Dwyane Wade | 22 – 17 January 1982 | 1.93 m (6 ft 4 in) | Miami Heat | (United States) |
| F | 7 | Carlos Boozer | 22 – 20 November 1981 | 2.05 m (6 ft 9 in) | Cleveland Cavaliers | (United States) |
| F | 8 | Carmelo Anthony | 20 – 29 May 1984 | 2.03 m (6 ft 8 in) | Denver Nuggets | (United States) |
| F | 9 | LeBron James | 19 – 30 December 1984 | 2.03 m (6 ft 8 in) | Cleveland Cavaliers | (United States) |
| C | 10 | Emeka Okafor | 21 – 28 September 1982 | 2.07 m (6 ft 9 in) | UConn Huskies | (United States) |
| F | 11 | Shawn Marion | 26 – 7 May 1978 | 2.00 m (6 ft 7 in) | Phoenix Suns | (United States) |
| C | 12 | Amar'e Stoudemire | 21 – 16 November 1982 | 2.08 m (6 ft 10 in) | Phoenix Suns | (United States) |
| F | 13 | Tim Duncan (C) | 28 – 25 April 1976 | 2.10 m (6 ft 11 in) | San Antonio Spurs | (United States) |
| F | 14 | Lamar Odom | 24 – 6 November 1979 | 2.08 m (6 ft 10 in) | Miami Heat | (United States) |
| G | 15 | Richard Jefferson | 24 – 21 June 1980 | 2.00 m (6 ft 7 in) | New Jersey Nets | (United States) |

Head coach

- (United States) Larry Brown

Assistant coach(es)

- (United States) Gregg Popovich
- (United States) Roy Williams
- (United States) Oliver Purnell

Legend

- (C) Team captain
- nat field describes country
  of last club
  before the tournament
- Age as of August 13, 2004

After the United States finished in sixth place in the 2002 FIBA World Championship, the Americans overhauled their roster for the 2003 FIBA Tournament of the Americas in Puerto Rico, where they needed to qualify for the 2004 Summer Olympics. The team cruised to a first-place finish at the Americas Championship, and earned a spot in Athens, Greece, the following summer. However, the only players from the 2003 squad to compete in the Olympics were Tim Duncan, Allen Iverson, and Richard Jefferson; the rest of the team opted out. Newcomers to the team included young players LeBron James, Carmelo Anthony, Dwyane Wade, and Emeka Okafor. The team featured just one All-NBA selection (Duncan) and two All-Stars (Duncan and Iverson) from the prior NBA season, which are both all-time lows for a U.S. Olympic team since NBA players were first allowed in 1992. Team USA was coached by Larry Brown, who was coming off a championship in the 2004 NBA Finals.

== Summary ==
The United States struggled with its outside shooting, finishing the tournament ranked last in three point field goals made (5.5 per game) and 11th in percentage (31.4) out of 12 teams. They also struggled defensively.

The team's loss to Puerto Rico was just the third in U.S. Olympic men's basketball history. Their two previous losses were both to the Soviet Union (1972 and 1988), with six having been the largest margin of defeat.

Results
| Game | Opponent | Result | Point diff | Round | Notes | Ref. |
|---|---|---|---|---|---|---|
| 1 | Puerto Rico | L 73–92 | -19 | Group Play | Team's third and biggest Olympic loss | |
| 2 | Greece | W 77–71 | +6 | Group Play | | |
| 3 | Australia | W 89–79 | +10 | Group Play | | |
| 4 | Lithuania | L 90–94 | -4 | Group Play | Team's fourth Olympic loss | |
| 5 | Angola | W 89–53 | +36 | Group Play | | |
| 6 | Spain | W 102–94 | +8 | Quarterfinals | | |
| 7 | Argentina | L 81–89 | -8 | Semifinals | Team's fifth Olympic loss | |
| 8 | Lithuania | W 104–96 | +8 | Bronze Final | US wins bronze medal | |
Tournament totals: 5–3 record; 88 points per game; +4.6 average point differential

== Statistical leaders ==
| Category | Player | Team | Stat |
|---|---|---|---|
| Points per game | Allen Iverson | Philadelphia 76ers | 13.8 |
| Rebounds per game | Tim Duncan | San Antonio Spurs | 9.1 |
| Assists per game | Stephon Marbury | New York Knicks | 3.4 |
| Steals per game | Dwyane Wade | Miami Heat | 2.1 |
| Blocks per game | Tim Duncan | San Antonio Spurs | 1.3 |
| FG% | Carlos Boozer | Utah Jazz | .625 |

== Records broken ==
- Stephon Marbury scored 31 points and hit a record six three-pointers against Spain.
- Team USA shot 12-of-22 (54.5 percent) 3-pointers in that same game.
