= Basketball in the United States =

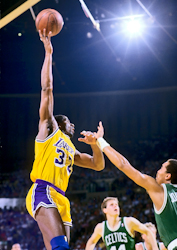
- Los Angeles Lakers versus Boston Celtics, 1987 NBA Finals
- Country: United States
- Governing body: USA Basketball
- National team: United States
- Registered players: 24.3 million

Club competitions
- List: Men's: National Basketball Association (Major League) NBA G League (first tier Minor League) 94x50 League (second tier Minor League) East Coast Basketball League (second tier Minor League) The Basketball League (second tier Minor League) United States Basketball League (second tier Minor League) American Basketball Association (semi-pro) Florida Basketball Association (semi-pro) Universal Basketball Association (semi-pro) Women's: Women's National Basketball Association (Major League) Unrivaled (3-on-3 League) UpShot League (first tier Minor League) Athletes Unlimited Basketball (second tier Minor League)

International competitions
- National teams: Summer Olympics; FIBA World Cup; FIBA Women's World Cup; FIBA U-19 Basketball World Cup; FIBA U-17 Basketball World Cup; FIBA AmeriCup; FIBA Women's AmeriCup; Clubs: FIBA Intercontinental Cup

The National Basketball Association (NBA) and Women's National Basketball Association (WNBA) are professional basketball leagues that govern most levels of professional basketball in the United States. Basketball is the second most popular sport in the United States (counting amateur levels), after American football. In terms of revenue, the NBA is the third most profitable sports league in the United States and the world, after the National Football League (NFL) and Major League Baseball (MLB). Basketball was invented in 1891 by Canadian physical education teacher James Naismith in Springfield, Massachusetts.

== NBA ==
The National Basketball Association (NBA) is the world's premier men's professional basketball league and one of the major professional sports leagues of North America. It contains 30 teams (29 teams in the U.S. and 1 in Canada) that play an 82-game season from October to June. After the regular season, eight teams from each conference compete in the playoffs for the Larry O'Brien Championship Trophy. The NBA gets high ratings on television.

The Chicago Bulls drew the highest average home attendance in the 2025-26 regular season of the NBA.

| # | NBA team | Home games | Average attendance |
|---|---|---|---|
| 1 | Chicago Bulls | 41 | 20,243 |
| 2 | Denver Nuggets | 41 | 19,826 |
| 3 | Miami Heat | 41 | 19,708 |
| 4 | Detroit Pistons | 41 | 19,668 |
| 5 | Cleveland Cavaliers | 41 | 19,432 |
| 6 | New York Knicks | 41 | 19,318 |
| 7 | Dallas Mavericks | 41 | 19,288 |
| 8 | Boston Celtics | 41 | 19,156 |
| 9 | Philadelphia 76ers | 41 | 18,996 |
| 10 | Los Angeles Lakers | 41 | 18,854 |
| 11 | Toronto Raptors¹ | 41 | 18,832 |
| 12 | Orlando Magic | 41 | 18,753 |
| 13 | Charlotte Hornets | 41 | 18,715 |
| 14 | Oklahoma City Thunder | 41 | 18,654 |
| 15 | San Antonio Spurs | 41 | 18,125 |
| 16 | Golden State Warriors | 41 | 18,064 |
| 17 | Houston Rockets | 41 | 18,058 |
| 18 | Utah Jazz | 41 | 17,742 |
| 19 | Los Angeles Clippers | 41 | 17,647 |
| 20 | Brooklyn Nets | 41 | 17,412 |
| 21 | Minnesota Timberwolves | 41 | 17,402 |
| 22 | Portland Trail Blazers | 41 | 17,097 |
| 23 | Phoenix Suns | 41 | 16,654 |
| 24 | Milwaukee Bucks | 41 | 16,649 |
| 25 | Indiana Pacers | 41 | 16,641 |
| 26 | New Orleans Pelicans | 41 | 16,475 |
| 27 | Atlanta Hawks | 41 | 16,355 |
| 28 | Sacramento Kings | 41 | 16,139 |
| 29 | Washington Wizards | 41 | 16,106 |
| 30 | Memphis Grizzlies | 41 | 15,414 |

¹ From Canada

== WNBA ==
The Women's National Basketball Association (WNBA) is the world's premier women's professional basketball league and one of the major women's professional sports leagues of North America. It contains 15 teams (14 teams in the U.S. and 1 in Canada), scheduled to expand to 18 by 2030, that play an 44-game season from May to September. After the regular season, eight teams from each conference compete in the playoffs, culminating in the WNBA Finals. Most WNBA teams play at the same venue as their NBA counterparts.

The WNBA was formed in 1996 as the women's counterpart to the National Basketball Association, and league play began in 1997. Historically, the WNBA struggled to approach the same national relevance as the NBA. However, since 2016 its ratings have increased and for the 2025 regular season WNBA games averaged 72% of NBA game viewership and 61% of NBA in-person attendance.

The Golden State Valkyries drew the highest average home attendance in the 2024-2025 regular season of the WNBA, which was their first season playing in the WNBA. Note that the table below does not include figures for the Portland Fire or the Toronto Tempo, which started play in the 2025-2026 regular season.

| # | WNBA team | Home games | Average attendance |
|---|---|---|---|
| 1 | Golden State Valkyries¹ | 22 | 18,064 |
| 2 | Indiana Fever | 22 | 16,560 |
| 3 | New York Liberty | 22 | 16,323 |
| 4 | Los Angeles Sparks | 22 | 12,441 |
| 5 | Seattle Storm | 22 | 11,835 |
| 6 | Las Vegas Aces | 22 | 11,552 |
| 7 | Phoenix Mercury | 22 | 11,305 |
| 8 | Minnesota Lynx | 22 | 9,957 |
| 9 | Chicago Sky | 22 | 9,072 |
| 10 | Connecticut Sun | 22 | 8,653 |
| 11 | Dallas Wings | 22 | 7,272 |
| 12 | Washington Mystics | 22 | 5,303 |
| 13 | Atlanta Dream | 22 | 4,480 |

¹ The Golden State Valkyries sold out every home game in the 2024-25 regular season.

== National teams ==
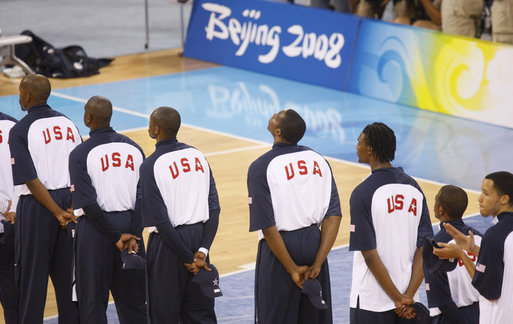
U.S. men's national basketball team at the 2008 Summer Olympics.

Since the 1992 Summer Olympics, NBA and WNBA players have represented the United States in international competition and won numerous important tournaments. The Dream Team was the unofficial nickname of the United States men's basketball team that won the gold medal at the 1992 Olympics. The women's national team is one of the most dominant teams in all of Olympic sports, has won eight consecutive gold medals at the Olympics, an Olympic record team record in any Olympic sport. The women's national team has also won eleven FIBA World Cups and the men's team has won 5 FIBA World Cups.

== College basketball ==
College basketball is quite popular and draws TV high ratings. Every March, a 68-team, six-round, single-elimination tournament (commonly called March Madness) determines the national champions of NCAA Division I women's and men's basketball tournament college basketball.

The North Carolina Tar Heels drew the highest average home game attendance in the 2024-2025 season of men's college basketball, while the South Carolina Gamecocks drew the highest average home game attendance for women's college basketball. These top 30 figures reflect the popularity of college basketball as a spectator sport in the United States:

| # | College basketball team | Home games | Average attendance |
|---|---|---|---|
| 1 | North Carolina Tar Heels | 15 | 20,521 |
| 2 | Kentucky Wildcats | 18 | 20,334 |
| 3 | Tennessee Volunteers | 17 | 20,026 |
| 4 | Arkansas Razorbacks | 18 | 18,996 |
| 5 | Syracuse Orange | 17 | 18,888 |
| 6 | Creighton Bluejays | 17 | 17,366 |
| 7 | BYU Cougars | 17 | 17,054 |
| 8 | Indiana Hoosiers | 18 | 16,447 |
| 9 | South Carolina Gamecocks | 17 | 16,437 |
| 10 | Marquette Golden Eagles | 17 | 15,571 |
| 11 | Kansas Jayhawks | 17 | 15,300 |
| 12 | Illinois Fighting Illini | 17 | 15,091 |
| 13 | Wisconsin Badgers | 17 | 15,006 |
| 14 | Iowa Hawkeyes | 14 | 14,998 |
| 15 | Nebraska Cornhuskers | 16 | 14,964 |
| 16 | Purdue Boilermakers | 16 | 14,876 |
| 17 | Louisville Cardinals | 17 | 14,864 |
| 18 | Michigan State Spartans | 16 | 14,797 |
| 19 | Iowa State Cyclons | 17 | 14,062 |
| 20 | Arizona Wildcats | 16 | 14,058 |
| 21 | Virginia Cavaliers | 17 | 13,478 |
| 22 | Dayton Flyers | 18 | 13,407 |
| 23 | Alabama Crimson Tide | 15 | 13,389 |
| 24 | Maryland Terrapins | 19 | 13,367 |
| 25 | NC State Wolfpack | 18 | 13,063 |
| 26 | New Mexico Lobos | 17 | 13,051 |
| 27 | Texas Tech Red Raiders | 18 | 13,042 |
| 28 | UConn Huskies | 16 | 12,992 |
| 29 | UConn Huskies | 16 | 12,375 |
| 30 | Michigan Wolverines | 16 | 12,007 |

== High school basketball ==
High school basketball is a popular activity. The National Federation of State High School Associations featured 540,704 boys and 356,240 girls in basketball teams as of the 2024–25 season.

Many high school basketball teams have intense local followings, especially in the Midwest. Indiana has 10 of the 12 largest high school gyms in the United States, and is famous for its basketball passion, known as Hoosier Hysteria.

== Race and ethnicity in the NBA ==
The composition of race and ethnicity in the National Basketball Association (NBA) has changed throughout the league's history.

In the 2019-2020 season, 81.1% of players in the NBA were Black (if mixed-race players are also counted as black), 17.9% were white, and 1% were of other races.. The league has the highest percentage of Black players of any major professional sports league in the United States and Canada.
