= 1996 United States men's Olympic basketball team =

U.S. Olympic team (1996)

- Head coach: Lenny Wilkens
- Scoring leader: (United States) Charles Barkley 12.4
- Rebounding leader: (United States) Charles Barkley 6.6
- Assists leader: (United States) Gary Payton 4.5

The men's national basketball team of the United States won the gold medal at the 1996 Summer Olympics in Atlanta, Georgia. Led by Basketball Hall of Fame head coach Lenny Wilkens, the team won gold for the second straight Olympics. Nicknamed Dream Team III, the team included five players who were Olympic teammates on the original "Dream Team", from the 1992 Olympic basketball tournament: Charles Barkley, Karl Malone, Scottie Pippen, John Stockton, and David Robinson. Gary Payton was a late replacement for the injured Glenn Robinson.

== Roster ==
With Michael Jordan intimating in 1994 that he would pass on the opportunity to participate in his third Olympic Games to let others get their chance at a gold medal, USA Basketball officials sought to construct the team dubbed Dream Team III with a winning combination of veteran players from the 1992 Dream Team that won the gold medal in Barcelona and some of the league's best young talent.

The first 10 players of the 1996 United States men's national basketball team roster were announced in summer 1995, featuring young talent and first-time Olympians, including Penny Hardaway, Grant Hill, Shaquille O'Neal, and Gary Payton, who was added as a replacement for an injured Glenn Robinson. Other veteran players who were first-time Olympians were Reggie Miller and Hakeem Olajuwon. Olajuwon, a native of Nigeria, became the third naturalized American citizen after Ernie Grunfeld and Patrick Ewing to play for the U.S. Olympic men's basketball team. Mitch Richmond, along with Charles Barkley, were added in April 1996 completing the roster as the 11th and 12th members. Thus, the holdovers from the 1992 Olympic Team, Karl Malone, Scottie Pippen, David Robinson, John Stockton, and Charles Barkley, coupled with the six first-time Olympians and 1988 bronze medalist Mitch Richmond formed the 1996 United States men's Olympic basketball team roster.

United States men's national basketball team – 1996 Summer Olympics roster
Players

Pos.	#	Name	Age	Height	Weight	From
PF	4	Barkley, Charles	33	6 ft 6 in (1.98 m)	255 lb (116 kg)	Phoenix Suns
SF	5	Hill, Grant	23	6 ft 8 in (2.03 m)	225 lb (102 kg)	Detroit Pistons
PG	6	Hardaway, Anfernee	25	6 ft 7 in (2.01 m)	200 lb (91 kg)	Orlando Magic
C	7	Robinson, David	30	7 ft 1 in (2.16 m)	235 lb (107 kg)	San Antonio Spurs
SF	8	Pippen, Scottie	30	6 ft 8 in (2.03 m)	225 lb (102 kg)	Chicago Bulls
SG	9	Richmond, Mitch	31	6 ft 5 in (1.96 m)	215 lb (98 kg)	Sacramento Kings
SG	10	Miller, Reggie	30	6 ft 7 in (2.01 m)	190 lb (86 kg)	Indiana Pacers
PF	11	Malone, Karl	33	6 ft 9 in (2.06 m)	255 lb (116 kg)	Utah Jazz
PG	12	Stockton, John	34	6 ft 1 in (1.85 m)	175 lb (79 kg)	Utah Jazz
C	13	O'Neal, Shaquille	24	7 ft 1 in (2.16 m)	301 lb (137 kg)	Orlando Magic
PG	14	Payton, Gary	28	6 ft 4 in (1.93 m)	190 lb (86 kg)	Seattle SuperSonics
C	15	Olajuwon, Hakeem	33	7 ft 0 in (2.13 m)	255 lb (116 kg)	Houston Rockets

Coaches

Head coach

- Lenny Wilkens

Assistant coaches

- Bobby Cremins
- Clem Haskins
- Jerry Sloan

Legend

- From describes teams affiliated
  during the Olympics

== Staff ==
- Head coach: Lenny Wilkens (Atlanta Hawks)
- Assistant coaches: Jerry Sloan (Utah Jazz), Bobby Cremins (Georgia Tech), and Clem Haskins (University of Minnesota)
- Team physicians: Steve Haas (Washington Bullets), John A. Hefferon (Chicago Bulls), and Bruce Moseley (Houston Rockets)
- Athletic trainers: Steven Brace (Creighton University) and Ron Culp (Miami Heat)

== 1996 USA results ==
- United States beat Argentina, 96–68
- United States beats Angola, 87–54
- United States beat Lithuania, 104–82
- United States beat China, 133–70
- United States beat Croatia, 102–71
- United States beat Brazil, 98–75 (quarterfinals)
- United States beat Australia, 101–73 (semifinals)
- United States beat (Federal Republic of Yugoslavia) FR Yugoslavia, 95–69 (gold-medal game)
