= United States men's national basketball team =

United States
2024 United States men's Olympic basketball team
- FIBA ranking: 1 (September 1, 2026)
- Joined FIBA: 1934; 92 years ago
- FIBA zone: FIBA Americas
- National federation: USA Basketball
- Coach: Erik Spoelstra
- Nickname: Team USA

Olympic Games
- Appearances: 20
- Medals: Gold: 17 (1936, 1948, 1952, 1956, 1960, 1964, 1968, 1976, 1984, 1992, 1996, 2000, 2008, 2012, 2016, 2020, 2024); Silver: 1 (1972); Bronze: 2 (1988, 2004)

FIBA World Cup
- Appearances: 55
- Medals: Gold: 5 (1954, 1986, 1994, 2010, 2014); Silver: 3 (1950, 1959, 1982); Bronze: 4 (1974, 1990, 1998, 2006)

FIBA AmeriCup
- Appearances: 12
- Medals: Gold: 7 (1992, 1993, 1997, 1999, 2003, 2007, 2017); Silver: 1 (1989); Bronze: 2 (2022, 2025)
Home	Away

First international
- United States 2–0 Spain (forfeit) (Berlin, Germany; August 7, 1936)

Biggest win
- United States 156–73 Nigeria (London, United Kingdom; August 2, 2012)

Biggest defeat
- United States 73–92 Puerto Rico (Athens, Greece; August 15, 2004)
Medal record
Olympic Games
Gold medal – first place	1936 Berlin	Team
Gold medal – first place	1948 London	Team
Gold medal – first place	1952 Helsinki	Team
Gold medal – first place	1956 Melbourne	Team
Gold medal – first place	1960 Rome	Team
Gold medal – first place	1964 Tokyo	Team
Gold medal – first place	1968 Mexico City	Team
Gold medal – first place	1976 Montreal	Team
Gold medal – first place	1984 Los Angeles	Team
Gold medal – first place	1992 Barcelona	Team
Gold medal – first place	1996 Atlanta	Team
Gold medal – first place	2000 Sydney	Team
Gold medal – first place	2008 Beijing	Team
Gold medal – first place	2012 London	Team
Gold medal – first place	2016 Rio de Janeiro	Team
Gold medal – first place	2020 Tokyo	Team
Gold medal – first place	2024 Paris	Team
Silver medal – second place	1972 Munich	Team
Bronze medal – third place	1988 Seoul	Team
Bronze medal – third place	2004 Athens	Team
FIBA World Cup
Gold medal – first place	1954 Brazil
Gold medal – first place	1986 Spain
Gold medal – first place	1994 Canada
Gold medal – first place	2010 Turkey
Gold medal – first place	2014 Spain
Silver medal – second place	1950 Argentina
Silver medal – second place	1959 Chile
Silver medal – second place	1982 Colombia
Bronze medal – third place	1974 Puerto Rico
Bronze medal – third place	1990 Argentina
Bronze medal – third place	1998 Greece
Bronze medal – third place	2006 Japan
FIBA AmeriCup
Gold medal – first place	1992 United States
Gold medal – first place	1993 Puerto Rico
Gold medal – first place	1997 Uruguay
Gold medal – first place	1999 Puerto Rico
Gold medal – first place	2003 Puerto Rico
Gold medal – first place	2007 United States
Gold medal – first place	2017 Argentina / Colombia / Uruguay
Silver medal – second place	1989 Mexico
Bronze medal – third place	2022 Brazil
Bronze medal – third place	2025 Nicaragua

The USA Basketball Men's National Team, commonly known as Team USA and the United States men's national basketball team, is the basketball team representing the United States. It is the most successful men's team in international competition, winning medals in all twenty Olympic tournaments it has entered, including seventeen golds. In the professional era, the team has won the Olympic gold medal in 1992, 1996, 2000, 2008, 2012, 2016, 2020, and 2024. Three of its gold medal-winning teams have been inducted to the Naismith Memorial Basketball Hall of Fame: the 1960 team, which featured six Hall of Famers (4 players, 2 coaches); the 1992 "Dream Team", featuring 14 Hall of Famers (11 players, 3 coaches), both inducted in August 2010; and the 2008 "Redeem Team", featuring 9 Hall of Famers (6 players, 3 coaches), which was inducted in September 2022. The team is currently ranked first in the FIBA World Rankings.

Traditionally composed of amateur players, the US dominated the first decades of international basketball, winning a record seven consecutive Olympic gold medals. However, by the end of the 1980s, American amateurs faced increasing difficulty against seasoned professionals from the Soviet Union and Yugoslavia.

In 1989, FIBA modified its rules and allowed USA Basketball to field teams with National Basketball Association players. The first such team, known as the "Dream Team", won the gold medal at the 1992 Summer Olympics in Barcelona, being superior in all matches. With the introduction of NBA players, the team was able to spark a second run of dominance in the 1990s.

Facing increased competition, the US failed to win a medal at the 2002 FIBA World Championship, finishing sixth. The 2004 Olympic team, being depleted by a number of withdrawals, lost three games on its way to a bronze medal, a record that represented more losses in a single year than the country's Olympic teams had suffered in all previous Olympiads combined.

Determined to put an end to these failures, USA Basketball initiated a long-term project aimed at creating better, more cohesive teams. The US won its first seven games at the 2006 FIBA World Championship in Japan before losing against Greece in the semi-finals; ending the competition with the bronze medal. The team won gold two years later—at the 2008 Summer Olympics—in a dominant fashion. This success was followed up at the 2010 FIBA World Championship, where despite fielding a roster featuring no players from the 2008 Olympic team, the US did not lose a single game en route to defeating host Turkey for the gold medal.

The Americans continued this streak of dominance in the 2010s by going undefeated and capturing gold at the 2012 Summer Olympics and 2014 FIBA World Cup. At the 2016 Summer Olympics, the team, led by Mike Krzyzewski for a record third time, won its 15th gold medal, making him the most decorated coach in USA Basketball history. After Krzyzewski stepped down in 2016, Team USA lost to France in the quarter-finals of the 2019 FIBA World Cup, finishing seventh overall. However, Team USA would avenge this loss in the 2020 Summer Olympics, defeating France 87–82 in the final to capture the team's fourth straight gold medal and 16th overall. The team repeated as champions in the 2024 Summer Olympics in Paris, once again defeating France 98–87 in the final.

== History ==
=== 1936–1968 ===
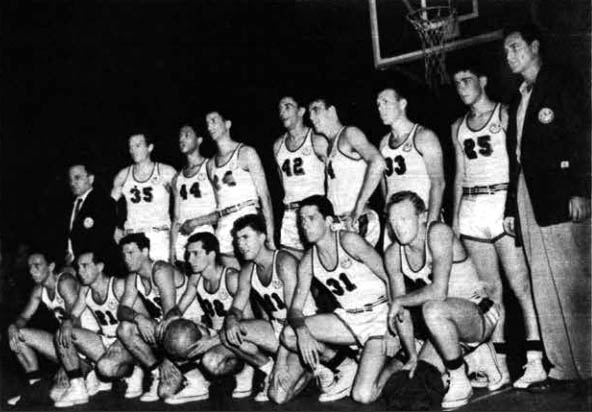
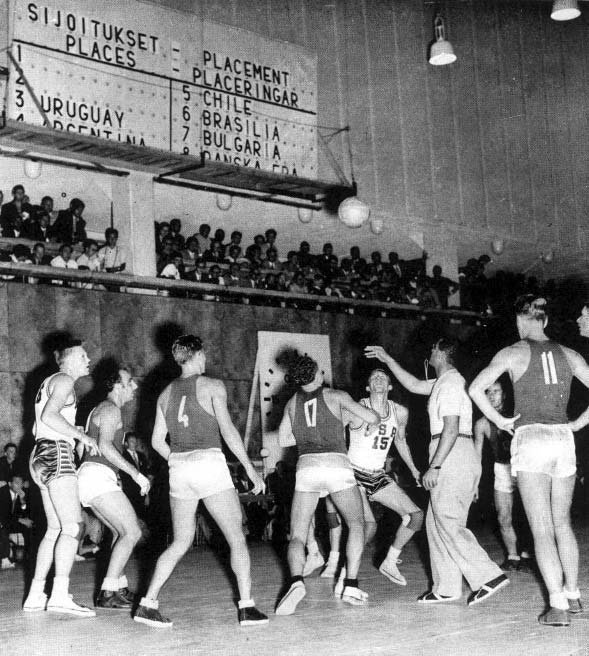
(Left): The US team, gold medalists at the 1951 Pan American Games in Buenos Aires; (right): Game between the US and the USSR in the 1952 Olympics

The United States joined FIBA at the end of 1934 under the supervision of the Amateur Athletic Union. The US men were dominant from the first Olympic tournament to hold basketball, held in Berlin in 1936, going 5–0 to win the gold, and joined by continental neighbors Canada and Mexico on the medal platform. Through the next six tournaments, the United States went undefeated, collecting gold while not losing a single contest in the games held in London, Helsinki, Melbourne, Rome, Tokyo, and Mexico City. Participation in these tournaments was limited to amateurs, but the US teams during this period featured players who would later go on to become superstars in professional basketball, including all-time greats Bill Russell, Oscar Robertson, Jerry West, and Jerry Lucas; the latter three competed on the 1960 Rome team often credited as the best US roster until the formation of the 1992 Dream Team.

Alex Groza and Ralph Beard, both briefly NBA stars, made the 1948 squad as Kentucky Wildcats, with 3-time Oklahoma State All-American and 6-time AAU All-American, and Hall of Famer Bob Kurland leading the way. The 1952 team included big man Clyde Lovellette of the University of Kansas, a future Hall of Famer and NBA star. Kurland once again led the team to victory.

The 1956 team was led by San Francisco Dons teammates Bill Russell and K. C. Jones, and defeated its opponents by an unsurpassed average margin of 53.5 points per game.

The 1960 team included nine future NBA players, including four consecutive NBA Rookie(s) of the Year; Robertson (1961 NBA Rookie of the Year), Lucas (1964 NBA Rookie of the Year), Terry Dischinger (1963 NBA Rookie of the Year), and Walt Bellamy (1962 NBA Rookie of the Year) but also Hall of Famer Jerry West and NBA All-Star(s), Darrall Imhoff (1967 NBA All Star), Bob Boozer (1968 NBA All Star), Adrian Smith (1966 NBA All Star game MVP) and Jay Arnette. They defeated their opponents by an average margin of 42.4 points per game.

=== 1972–1988 ===
The 1972 Olympic men's basketball gold medal game, marking the first ever loss for the US in Olympic play, ranks among the most controversial events in Olympic history. The United States rode their seven consecutive gold medals and 63–0 Olympic record to Munich for the 1972 Summer Olympics. The team won its first eight games in convincing fashion, setting up a final against the Soviet Union, holding a 6–0 advantage over the Soviets in Olympic play.

With three seconds left in the gold medal game, American forward Doug Collins sank two free throws after being hit hard by a Soviet player to put the Americans up 50–49. Immediately following Collins' free throws, the Soviets inbounded the ball and failed to score. Soviet coaches claimed that they had requested a timeout before Collins' foul shots. The referees ordered the clock reset to three seconds and the game's final seconds replayed. The horn sounded as a length-of-the-court Soviet pass was being released from the inbounding player, the pass missed its mark, and the American players began celebrating.

Nevertheless, the final three seconds were replayed for a third time. This time, the Soviets' Alexander Belov and the US's Kevin Joyce and Jim Forbes went up for the pass, and Belov caught the long pass from Ivan Edeshko near the American basket. Belov then laid the ball in for the winning points as the buzzer sounded. The US players voted unanimously to refuse their silver medals, and at least one team member, Kenny Davis, has directed in his will that his heirs are never to accept the medals, even posthumously. It remains to this day a possibility that game officials were bribed by the Communist party.

After the controversial loss in Munich, 1976 saw Dean Smith coach the US to a 7–0 record and its eighth Olympic gold medal in Montreal. The success at this tournament pushed the US's all-time Olympic record to an impressive 78–1.

The Soviet invasion of Afghanistan prompted the United States and 66 other countries to boycott the 1980 Olympics, held in Moscow. The 1980 US team, which featured a number of future NBA players, was the youngest American national team ever assembled. This team featured: Mark Aguirre, Rolando Blackman, Sam Bowie, Michael Brooks, Bill Hanzlik, Alton Lister, Rodney McCray, Isiah Thomas, Darnell Valentine, Danny Vranes, Buck Williams and Al Wood. Unable to compete in the Olympics due to the boycott, it instead participated in the "Gold Medal Series", a series of games against NBA all-star teams in various US cities, recording a 5–1 record. It was coached by Dave Gavitt.

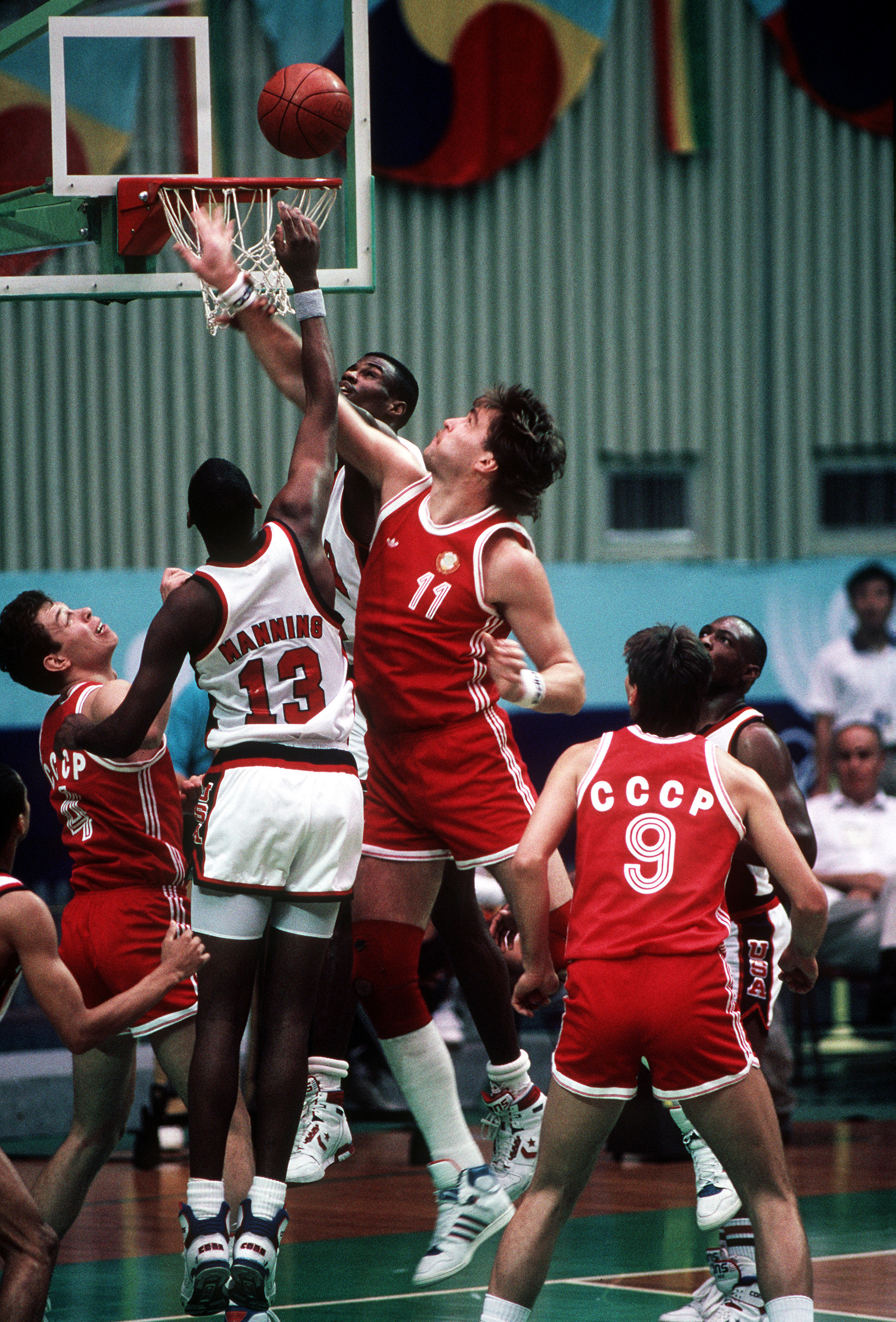
Danny Manning and the Navy's David Robinson battle Arvydas Sabonis in the 1988 Olympic semi-finals

Michael Jordan, Patrick Ewing, and Chris Mullin, future members of the 1992 Dream Team, made their Olympic debuts in 1984. Jordan led the team with 17.1 points per game, and Bob Knight coached the team to an 8–0 record and another Olympic gold.

At the 1987 Pan American Games, held at Indianapolis, the US basketball team was defeated in the final match by Brazil. Oscar Schmidt led his teammates to an achievement: after a 54:68 halftime score, Brazil beat the US 120 to 115. The 3-pointer line — introduced by FIBA just 3 years before — had become tactically relevant. Although not a major competition, Indianapolis '87 brought some important facts: for the first time in basketball history, the US was defeated at home; for the first time, in a final; for the first time, by a team that scored more than 100 points. This defeat would bring changes to the sport soon.

The 1988 US team had a roster of collegians aged 20–23 that included future NBA all-stars David Robinson, Danny Manning, and Mitch Richmond. The team came up short, winning the bronze medal. The American team lost to the gold medal winner Soviet Union in the semifinals, but then regrouped and went on to beat Australia 78–49 in the bronze medal game. Dan Majerle led the team in scoring, averaging 14.1 points per game. This was the last time the American Olympic Team consisted exclusively of non-NBA (college) players.

=== 1992–2000 ===
The decade started with a semifinal loss to Yugoslavia in the 1990 FIBA World Championship, followed by another semifinal defeat to Puerto Rico in the 1991 Pan American Games in Havana. The 1990 championship marked the last time that the US was represented by college players at a major international tournament (World Championship & Olympics).

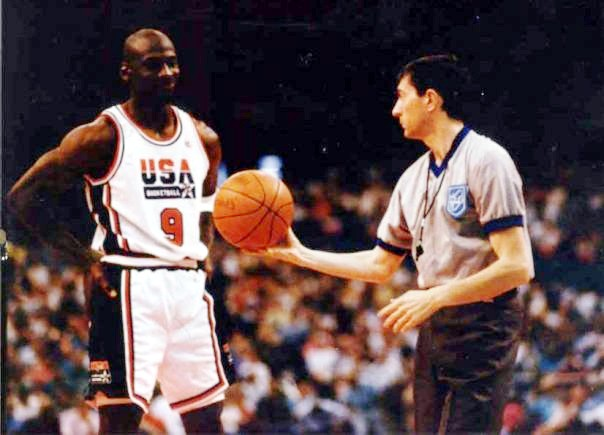
Michael Jordan as part of the Dream Team during the 1992 Olympics

The decades-long use of "shamateurs" by the Soviet Union, Yugoslavia and other international teams prompted FIBA to modify its rules and allow NBA players in the 1992 Olympics and beyond. The team assembled by USA Basketball for the tournament in Barcelona in 1992 was one of the most illustrious collections of talent assembled in the history of international sport. Of the twelve players on the team, ten were named in 1996 among the 50 Greatest Players in NBA History, the NBA's official list of the 50 greatest players of the league's first 50 years. Magic Johnson and Larry Bird served as co-captains.

Because of this star line-up, the team's games usually featured opposing teams asking for pregame photos and autographs with their US opponents. As expected, the US team ran away with the gold medal; they were so much better than the competition that head coach Chuck Daly did not call a single timeout during the tournament. The 1992 Dream Team won by an average of 43.8 points (second most, behind the 1956 US team). The only time the US was remotely threatened was against Croatia, which was beaten by 32. Michael Jordan and Scottie Pippen became the first players to win both NBA championship and Olympic gold medal in the same year, having played for the Chicago Bulls.

Regarding drug-testing the athletes, according to USA Basketball spokesman Craig Miller, "Since 1990, all of our teams have been tested in competition. I believe since around 1988 we have also been subject to out-of-competition testing. We have been 100 percent fully compliant with USADA and WADA."

The United States fielded another team composed of NBA players in the 1994 World Championship, held in Toronto, Ontario, Canada. This was an entirely new roster, as USA Basketball elected to showcase stars who were not present at the 1992 Olympics. Composed primarily of younger NBA players, the team lacked the widespread appeal of its predecessor but nevertheless continued its dominance. Those players were Derrick Coleman, Joe Dumars, Kevin Johnson, Larry Johnson, Shawn Kemp, Dan Majerle, Reggie Miller, Alonzo Mourning, Shaquille O'Neal, Mark Price, Steve Smith and Dominique Wilkins. Coached by Don Nelson of the Golden State Warriors, this team easily captured the gold medal in tournament play. The team was referred to as the "Dream Team II".

The third team composed of NBA players participated in the 1996 Summer Olympics held in Atlanta. The star quality of the team was impressive as it featured five members of the original Dream Team (Barkley, Malone, Pippen, Robinson, and Stockton), plus two other members of the NBA 50 Greatest Players list, Hakeem Olajuwon and Shaquille O'Neal. Lenny Wilkens coached the team.

The Americans won another gold medal with an average margin of victory of 31.8 points per game. They captured the gold medal after defeating Yugoslavia 95–69. With Atlanta being home to the Hawks, these games were the first Olympics to take place in a city with an NBA team since the league started allowing its players to compete in the Olympics. The team was commonly referred to as the "Dream Team III".

The 1998 World Championship in Athens, Greece was different from the previous teams, as none of its players were current members of NBA teams. Because of a labor dispute that led to a lockout, no active NBA players were permitted to compete in the tournament. The 12 NBA players picked before the lockout were Tim Duncan, Tim Hardaway, Vin Baker, Gary Payton, Terrell Brandon, Kevin Garnett, Tom Gugliotta, Grant Hill, Allan Houston, Christian Laettner, Glen Rice, and Chris Webber.

The replacement team was composed largely of players from American colleges, the minor-league Continental Basketball Association, or European pro leagues. The unheralded roster captured a bronze medal, considered a solid achievement given its lack of top-notch talent. The team was nicknamed the "Dirty Dozen" for its work ethic and teamwork. Undrafted free agent Brad Miller became a two-time NBA All-Star. Some of the other team members—including Trajan Langdon, Kiwane Garris, David Wood and Michael Hawkins—had brief spells in the NBA. All went on to have careers in Europe, with Langdon being named to the Euroleague's All-Decade Team for the 2000s.

During the late 1990s, international basketball began to gather attention as more and more foreign players became stars in the NBA. Therefore, the 2000 US team had the enormous task of proving that American basketball could remain the best in the world. The new team that was assembled again featured NBA players, but this time few of them were considered to be true superstars, as several elite players elected not to participate.

The US team participated in the 2000 Olympics in Sydney, Australia and was coached by Rudy Tomjanovich. It won its first two games by lopsided margins, but faced more difficult competition thereafter. In a preliminary game against Lithuania, the US team won 85–76, marking the first time a team of professional American players failed to win by double digits. Two games later, in a 106–94 victory over France, Vince Carter pulled off one of the most famous dunks in basketball history, jumping over the 7 ft 2 in (2.18 m) French center Frédéric Weis on his way to the basket. (The French media would dub Carter's feat le dunk de la mort—"the dunk of death".)

A shock came in the semifinals when the United States defeated Lithuania by the close score of 85–83. Lithuanian star (and future NBA player, first with the Indiana Pacers and later with the Golden State Warriors) Šarūnas Jasikevičius failed to get a potential game-winning 3-point shot off in time.

The closeness of the semifinal game was so shocking that NBC took the unusual step of showing the gold medal game live rather than on tape delay. (The game started around 2 p.m. Sydney time on Sunday, October 1, which is late Saturday evening in the United States. NBC originally planned to show the game almost 24 hours later during its Sunday prime time broadcast.) The US won the gold medal against France in a close game, 85–75. Though the US went undefeated on its way to the gold medal, the team began to lose its aura of invincibility for the first time.

=== 2001–2004 ===
As the United States had already qualified for the 2002 World Championship as the host country, USA Basketball decided to field players from the National Junior College Athletic Association (NJCAA) for the Tournament of the Americas in August 2001. Coached by Dan Sparks, the team finished last, losing all four games. Marcus Banks led the team in scoring, averaging 18.0 points.

The 2002 team competed in the World Championship in Indianapolis, Indiana, United States. Coached by George Karl, the team finished a surprisingly disappointing sixth in the competition. During the tournament, Argentina defeated the US in the second preliminary round group stage, thus becoming the first team ever to defeat a US team composed of NBA players. Yugoslavia knocked out the US in the quarterfinals, becoming the first team ever to defeat US team of NBA players in knockout stage. Then Spain repeated the outcome in the 5th place playoff. To a greater degree than in 2000, a number of top NBA players declined to participate, forcing USA Basketball to resort to picking mostly second-tier players. George Karl had a dispute with Paul Pierce, one of the few superstars on the team, which led to Karl benching Pierce, the team's leading scorer, in Team USA's final game. The group has been considered one of sport's greatest flops, as they failed to produce as previous teams had. The United States lost 3 games in the tournament to countries with current or future NBA stars, like Argentina (led by Manu Ginóbili), Yugoslavia (led by Peja Stojaković and Vlade Divac) and Spain (led by Pau Gasol).

Two NBA superstars, Ray Allen and Jason Kidd, accepted roles to play on the World Championship team, but were unable to play on that team due to injuries. Many other superstars, including Kobe Bryant, Shaquille O'Neal, and Kevin Garnett, turned down invitations to play in that tournament.

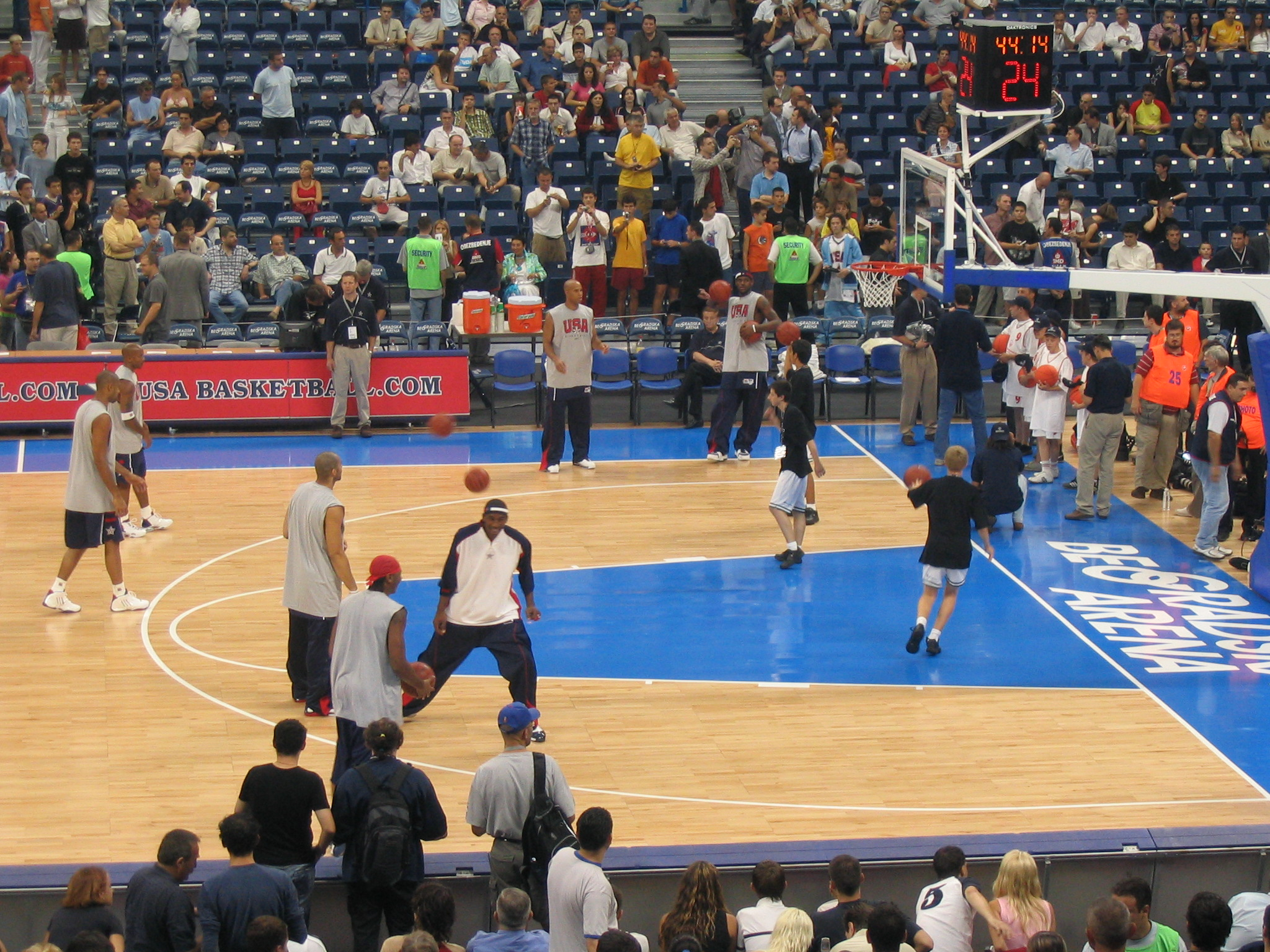
Team USA members warm up before the game in 2004 in Belgrade Arena

The close outcome of 2000 and the humiliating results of 2002 prompted a number of NBA superstars to agree to join the team for the FIBA Americas Championship 2003, dubbed as the Dream Team IV, which the squad was required to participate in to qualify for the 2004 Summer Olympics. The team easily cruised to a first-place finish, earning it a spot in Athens, Greece, the following summer.

However, the dominant team that competed in 2003 could not be kept together. Nine of its 12 players elected not to participate in Athens. The new team consisted of some young NBA stars early in their careers, such as Dwyane Wade, LeBron James and Carmelo Anthony. Only Richard Jefferson, Tim Duncan and Allen Iverson were part of the 2003 FIBA Americas San Juan gold medal team. The team was coached by Larry Brown.

After struggles in several exhibition matches, the vulnerability of the 2004 team was confirmed when Puerto Rico defeated them 92–73, from which they earned the nickname "Nightmare team" (as mock opposed to the Dream Team concept), in the first game of the Olympic tournament in Athens. The 19 point defeat was the most lopsided loss for the US in the history of international competition. After the game, Larry Brown had strong comments about his coaching performance: "I'm humiliated, not for the loss – I can always deal with wins and losses – but I'm disappointed because I had a job to do as a coach, to get us to understand how we're supposed to play as a team and act as a team, and I don't think we did that".

After winning close games against Greece and Australia, The US fell to Lithuania, dropping to 2–2 in the Olympic tournament. Even after an 89–53 win over Angola, the Americans entered the knockout rounds in fourth place due to goal average, the lowest seed of their group. The Americans faced undefeated Spain in their quarterfinal game, winning 102–94.

However, the semifinal match saw the team defeated by Argentina 89–81, ending the United States' hold on the gold medal. The US did rebound to capture the bronze medal by defeating Lithuania. Still, it marked only the second time that an American team failed to officially win gold (excluding the 1980 Moscow Olympics boycott and ignoring the 1972 debacle), and the first time for an American team composed of NBA players.

=== 2006–2016 ===
Following the disappointments in 2002 and 2004, USA Basketball appointed Jerry Colangelo to be solely responsible for selecting the team. Colangelo made it clear that he would ask players for a three-year commitment—the 2006 FIBA World Championship and the 2008 Summer Olympics. In the 2006 Worlds, the team was eliminated by Greece in the semifinal, losing the game 101–95. The head coach was Duke University's Mike Krzyzewski, with assistants Jim Boeheim, Mike D'Antoni, and Nate McMillan. While some prominent players, such as Tim Duncan and Kevin Garnett, stated that they did not plan to play for the team, superstars Dwyane Wade, Kobe Bryant and LeBron James publicly announced their commitment for the 2006 Worlds and the ensuing 2008 Olympics. Wade, James and Carmelo Anthony were named captains of the 2006 US World Championship Team.

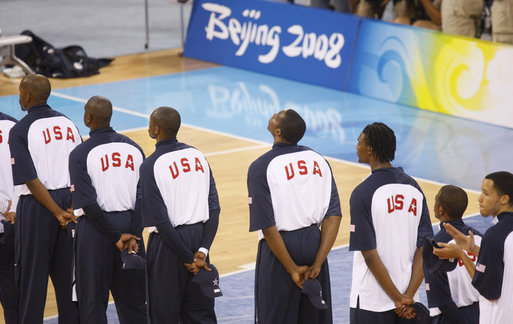
The US players standing prior to a game against China in the Beijing Olympics

The United States Team, dubbed Dream Team V or the Redeem Team, dominated Group B in pool play, defeating China, Angola, Greece, world champion Spain, and Germany by an average of 32.2 points. After finishing first in their group, the US earned the right to play the fourth-place finishers in Group A, Australia. The United States soundly defeated Australia 116–85 in the quarterfinal. Next up for the Americans in the semifinals was the 2004 Olympic gold medalist Argentina, led by Manu Ginóbili – the team that had beaten them in the semifinals four years prior. However, Ginóbili was hobbled by an ankle injury and only played sparing minutes in the first half. Behind Carmelo Anthony's 21 points, the US defeated Argentina 101–81 to reach the gold medal game.

On August 24, the United States defeated Spain 118–107 to capture the Olympic gold medal with the electrifying spark by Team USA leading scorer Dwyane Wade adding 27 points with four 3-point shots and 100% shooting inside the line. The victory ended an eight-year drought at major international competitions (Olympics & World Championships) with the first win since 2000.

Due to winning gold at the 2008 Olympics, the US automatically qualified for the World Championships. The US had not won the FIBA World Championship since 1994. It was initially believed that there would be only 2–3 spots available with most players returning from the 2008 Olympic team. However, by early July 2010, all ten invited players declined to participate, due to injury, free agency, rest, or personal commitments. Due to the roster being filled with 12 new players and the lack of star power, the team was dubbed the "B Team". Also, the coaches were criticized for selecting too many guards and inexperienced players, and not enough tall players.

However, the team won all five of its preliminary games, four of those by double digits (the exception being the win against Brazil by 2 points). The success continued in the knockout stage with victories by 55, 10 and 15. In the 2010 FIBA World Championship final, the US beat host nation Turkey by 17 points and won the gold medal. Tournament MVP Kevin Durant broke several Team USA scoring records (most points in a tournament-205, most points in a single game-38, and average points per game-22.8). In addition, Lamar Odom became the first player to win the NBA and FIBA World championships in the same year.

Team USA executive director Jerry Colangelo has said he's open to anyone from the 2010 team to play in future tournaments.

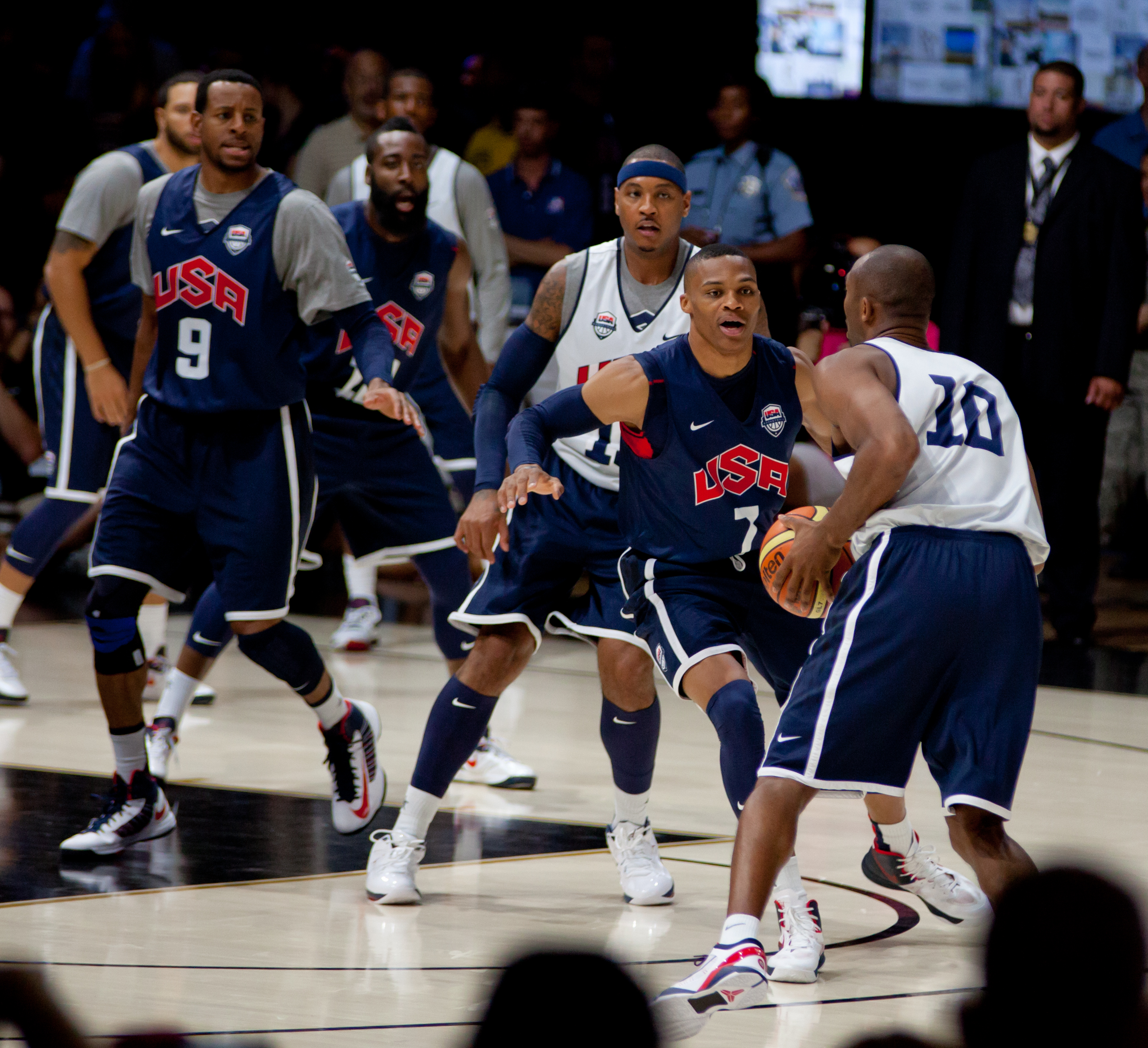
The 2012 team practicing in Washington, D.C.

The US team clinched a berth in the 2012 Olympics in London by winning the 2010 World Championship. The Olympic team lost some players to injuries who might have made the team and appeared to be short on big men. Their roster featured five players returning from the 2008 Olympic team and five others from the 2010 World Championship team.

The US went undefeated but appeared vulnerable at times in winning five exhibition games. They finished the tournament with a perfect 8–0 record, defeating opponents by an average of 32 points while trailing in the fourth quarter only once. The Americans often played with a small lineup that emphasized speed, quickness, and outside shooting. The team set an Olympic single-game record with 156 points scored against Nigeria in the preliminary round. In a rematch of the 2008 final, Team USA again narrowly defeated Spain to capture the gold.

This was announced as the final Olympic Games for Kobe Bryant. By winning the gold medal, the US automatically qualified for the 2014 FIBA World Cup.

The United States had automatically qualified for the World Cup by virtue of the gold medal won by their 2012 Olympic team. The Americans were considered favorites to win the World Cup. The roster was filled with two players returning from the 2012 Olympic team, three from the 2010 FIBA Championship Team, while seven other NBA players made their senior international debuts. The 2014 roster featured four players 6 feet 10 inches (2.08 m) or larger, the most of any US team since Mike Krzyzewski began coaching the team in 2006. The team was also the youngest American team since 1992 when NBA players were first allowed on the team; the average player was 24.08 years old, roughly a half-year younger than their 2010 team.

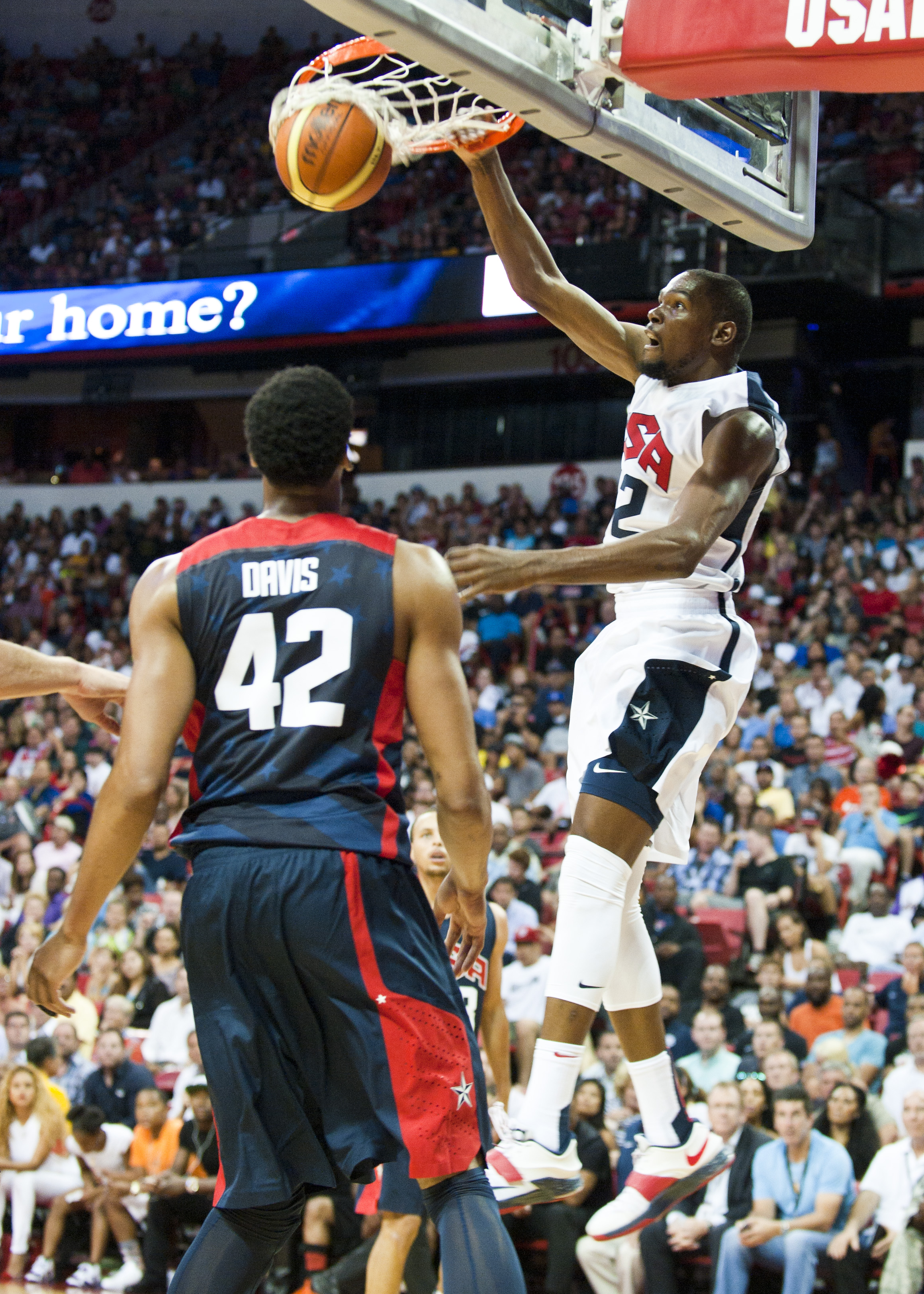
Kevin Durant dunking during an intra-squad scrimmage before the 2014 FIBA World Cup

The team advanced to the knockout phase after starting the tournament 5–0 during the group stage. They went undefeated 9–0 in the tournament, winning by an average margin of 33.0 points. The United States was just the third country in World Cup history to repeat as champions. Combined with their 2010 World Championship along with gold by their 2008 and 2012 Olympic teams, they also became the first country in FIBA basketball history to win four consecutive major titles. The United States defeated Serbia in the World Cup Final by 37 points and clinched a berth for the 2016 Summer Olympics.

Multiple withdrawals (largely triggered by a freak injury to Paul George in a pre-2014 World Cup scrimmage) left the 2016 US team with just two players with prior Olympic experience (Durant and Anthony). The Americans seemed vulnerable in the preliminary round, narrowly defeating Australia, Serbia, and France by a combined 16 points. However, the team gained momentum in the quarterfinal match against Argentina, winning 105–78. The US team then defeated Spain in the semifinals setting up a rematch versus Serbia in the gold medal game. The Americans proved their superiority, easily defeating their rival by 30 points. The team averaged 100.9 points per game with an average margin of victory of 22.5 points. Anthony, who won a record third straight Olympic gold medal, and Durant were top scorers. After the Olympics, Krzyzewski stepped down as the most decorated coach in USA Basketball history, having led three Olympic gold medal and two FIBA World Cup-winning squads.

=== 2017–present ===
In 2017, the United States would win a record 7th championship in the FIBA AmeriCup. In 2019, the team struggled and finished in 7th place at the FIBA World Cup. Despite featuring primarily young NBA players, the result was a huge shock and disappointment. At the 2020 Olympics in Tokyo, the United States reclaimed their glory by winning the fourth consecutive gold medal. Led by top scorers Kevin Durant, Jayson Tatum, and Devin Booker, the team was able to dominate the tournament and defeat France 87–82 in the final, despite losing to them early on in the group stage.

Team USA played two exhibition games in Abu Dhabi in the run-up to the 2023 FIBA World Cup. It was the first time that the men's national team played in the United Arab Emirates. The team was coached by nine-time NBA champion Steve Kerr, who won five titles as a player (three with the Chicago Bulls and two with the San Antonio Spurs) and four as head coach (with the Golden State Warriors). They ultimately finished fourth at the World Cup, behind Germany, Serbia, and Canada.

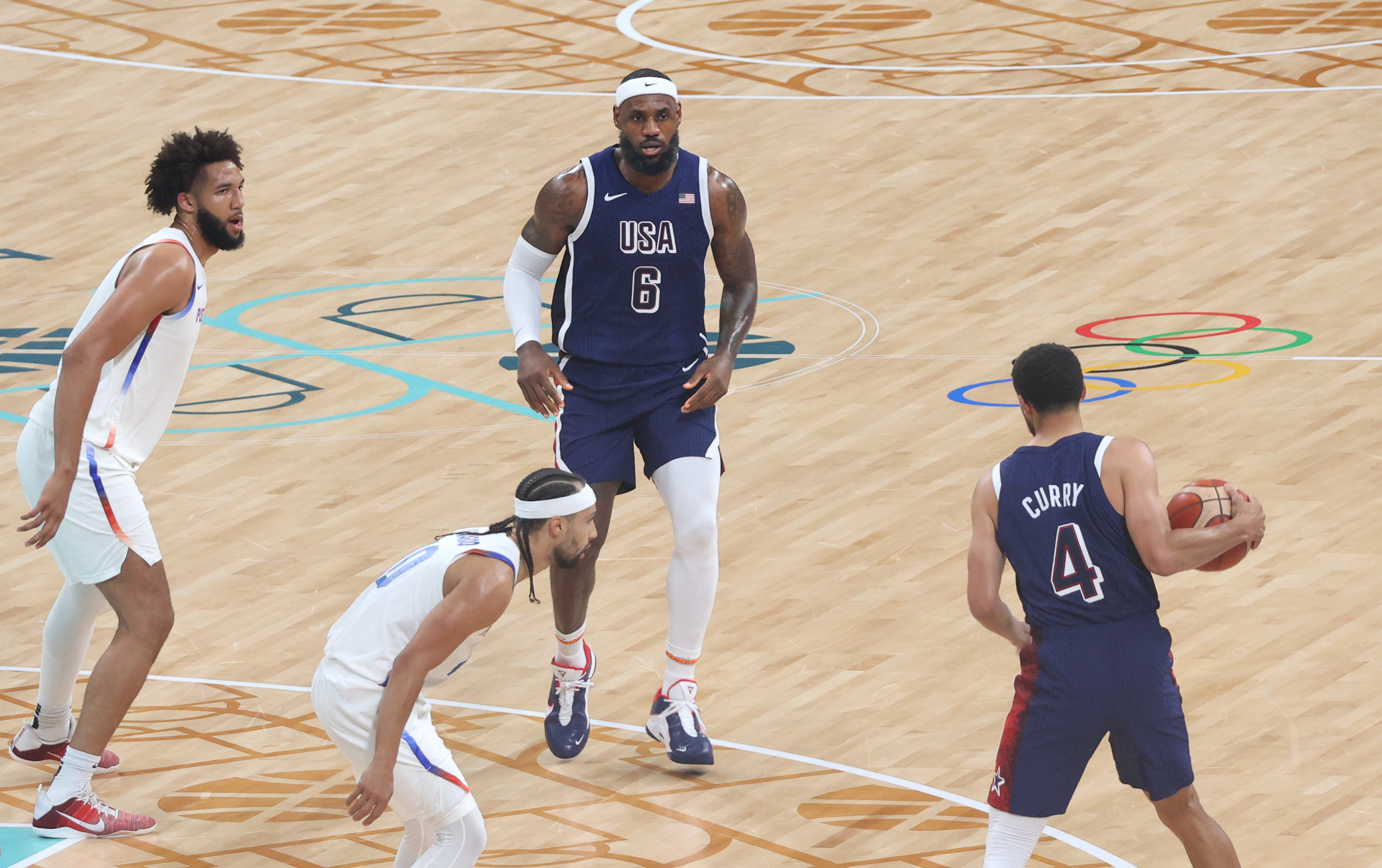
LeBron James and Stephen Curry during Group C game against Puerto Rico at the 2024 Summer Olympics

After 2023's fourth-place result at the FIBA World Cup, Grant Hill and Steve Kerr set out to convince more experienced players to play in the 2024 Summer Olympics. This included Lebron James, who had missed the last two Olympics; Stephen Curry, who had never played in the Olympics; and Kevin Durant. Returning Olympians would be Bam Adebayo, Jrue Holiday, Anthony Davis, and Jayson Tatum, while returning FIBA players included Anthony Edwards and Tyrese Haliburton. The team, dubbed "The LeVengers" by the media, would be the oldest U.S. men's basketball team, averaging 30 years and 9 months. Although six-time all-star Kawhi Leonard was initially drafted onto the roster, he was replaced by Derrick White due to injury. Team USA would play five exhibition games before the Olympics; although they convincingly beat Canada and Serbia, they were forced into a close game by Australia, who nearly overcame a 25-point deficit, and were at risk of losing to both South Sudan and world champions Germany. Durant would not play all five exhibition games due to a strained calf. During preliminary rounds of Olympic play, Team USA would go undefeated against Serbia, South Sudan, and Puerto Rico, earning the No. 1 seed entering the quarter-finals. Once in the quarterfinals, the U.S. convincingly defeated Brazil 122–87, with Booker leading the Americans with a team-high 18 points, before moving onto a second rematch vs Serbia in the semifinals. Here, Team USA won 95–91 after overcoming a 17-point deficit, with Curry scoring 36 points. In the final, the Americans faced hosts France for the second straight Olympics, with Curry scoring 24 points to lead the team to a 98–87 win. This win was Team USA's fifth consecutive Olympic gold medal in men's basketball.

== Honors ==
Olympic Games

- Gold medalists (17): 1936, 1948, 1952, 1956, 1960, 1964, 1968, 1976, 1984, 1992, 1996, 2000, 2008, 2012, 2016, 2020, 2024
- Silver medalists: 1972
- Bronze medalists: 1988, 2004

FIBA World Cup

- Champions: 1954, 1986, 1994, 2010, 2014
- Runners-up: 1950, 1959, 1982
- Third place: 1974, 1990, 1998, 2006

FIBA AmeriCup

- Champions: 1992, 1993, 1997, 1999, 2003, 2007, 2017
- Runners-up: 1989
- Third place: 2022, 2025

Competition	1st place, gold medalist(s)	2nd place, silver medalist(s)	3rd place, bronze medalist(s)	Total
Olympic Games	17	1	2	20
FIBA World Cup	5	3	4	12
FIBA AmeriCup	7	1	2	10
Total	29	5	8	42

=== Other awards ===
Pan American Games

- Gold medalists: 1951, 1955, 1959, 1963, 1967, 1975, 1979, 1983
- Silver medalists:: 1987, 1995, 1999
- Bronze medalists: 1991, 2011, 2015, 2019

Goodwill Games

- Gold medalists: 1986, 1998, 2001
- Silver medalists: 1990
- Bronze medalists: 1994

World University Games

- Gold medalists: 1965, 1967, 1973, 1977, 1979, 1981, 1989, 1991, 1993, 1995, 1997, 1999, 2005, 2015, (Note: The US was represented by the University of Kansas team. USA Basketball does not include their results in its records.) 2019
- Silver medalists: 1970, 1985, 1987, 2017 (Note: The US was represented by the Purdue University team. USA Basketball does not include their results in its records.), 2025
- Bronze medalists: 1983, 2001, 2009, 2021

== Competitive record ==
=== Olympic Games ===
The US team has achieved unparalleled success in the Olympic games. While historically at a disadvantage to the Eastern Bloc countries that had used their best and most experienced professional players listed as soldiers or workers in a profession to subvert the amateur rules, the US team (typically composed of AAU or collegiate players) did surprisingly well, winning nine out of eleven Olympic tournaments they had entered before the introduction of NBA players. The US is the only Western country that achieved success in a team sport during the Eastern Bloc dominance. Canada's results in ice hockey and Western European teams' results in soccer significantly deteriorated after the introduction of the Eastern Bloc countries and their quasi-professional players in the late 1940s and early 1950s. In 1992, the US team was represented by the NBA players for the first time and defeated its opponents by an average of 44 points en route to the gold medal against Croatia. The Americans have continued to dominate the Olympic tournaments ever since, excluding underachieving performance at the 2004 Summer Olympics.

Olympic Games record										Head coach(es)
Year	Result	Position	Pld	W	L	PF	PA	PD	Team	Head coach(es)
(Germany) 1936	Gold medalists	1st of 23	5 (Note: The United States' first opponent, Spain, did not show up for the game because of the outbreak of the Spanish Civil War. Team USA was credited with a 2–0 win by a forfeit.)	5	0	154	69	+85	Team	Needles
(United Kingdom) 1948	Gold medalists	1st of 23	8	8	0	524	256	+268	Team	Browning
(Finland) 1952	Gold medalists	1st of 23	8	8	0	562	406	+156	Team	Womble
(Australia) 1956	Gold medalists	1st of 15	8	8	0	793	365	+428	Team	Tucker
(Italy) 1960	Gold medalists	1st of 16	8	8	0	815	476	+339	Team	Newell
(Japan) 1964	Gold medalists	1st of 16	9	9	0	704	434	+270	Team	Iba
(Mexico) 1968	Gold medalists	1st of 16	9	9	0	739	505	+234	Team	Iba
(West Germany) 1972	Silver medalists	2nd of 16	9	8	1	660	401	+259	Team	Iba
(Canada) 1976	Gold medalists	1st of 12	7 (Note: Egypt withdrew from the 1976 games due to the mass boycott by African nations. The United States was credited with a 2–0 win by a forfeit.)	7	0	586	500	+86	Team	Smith
(Soviet Union) 1980	Originally qualified as defending champions, but withdrew									Gavitt
(United States) 1984	Gold medalists	1st of 12	8	8	0	763	506	+257	Team	Knight
(South Korea) 1988	Bronze medalists	3rd of 12	8	7	1	733	490	+243	Team	Thompson
(Spain) 1992	Gold medalists	1st of 12	8	8	0	938	588	+350	Team	Daly
(United States) 1996	Gold medalists	1st of 12	8	8	0	816	562	+254	Team	Wilkens
(Australia) 2000	Gold medalists	1st of 12	8	8	0	760	587	+173	Team	Tomjanovich
(Greece) 2004	Bronze medalists	3rd of 12	8	5	3	705	668	+37	Team	Brown
(China) 2008	Gold medalists	1st of 12	8	8	0	850	627	+223	Team	Krzyzewski
(United Kingdom) 2012	Gold medalists	1st of 12	8	8	0	924	667	+257	Team	Krzyzewski
(Brazil) 2016	Gold medalists	1st of 12	8	8	0	807	627	+180	Team	Krzyzewski
(Japan) 2020	Gold medalists	1st of 12	6	5	1	594	474	+120	Team	Popovich
(France) 2024	Gold medalists	1st of 12	6	6	0	632	518	+114	Team	Kerr
(United States) 2028	Qualified as host								Team	Spoelstra
Total	17 titles	20/22	155	149	6	14,059	9,726	+4,333		

=== World Cup ===
Prior to the introduction of the NBA players, the United States was usually represented by military, industrial or collegiate players. European and South American countries, meanwhile, were allowed to use their best players. In 1950 and 1954, AAU teams Denver Chevrolets (in 1950) and Peoria Caterpillars (1954) were the US representatives; in 1959, the United States sent an Air Force team; in 1963 and 1967, the team was composed of AAU, armed forces and college ranks; in 1970 and 1974 (with the 1974 team being the youngest and least experienced team in history), the US fielded exclusively collegians; in 1978, an Athletes In Action (AIA) team was the American representative; in 1982, 1986, and 1990, the team was again made up of collegiate players. Starting with 1994 and with the exception of 1998, when the US used players from the European leagues and college players, the team was made up of NBA players.

FIBA World Cup record										Manager(s)
Year	Result	Position	Pld	W	L	PF	PA	PD	Team	Manager(s)
(Argentina) 1950	Runners-up	2nd of 10	6	5	1	258	233	+25	Team	Carpenter
(Brazil) 1954	Champions	1st of 12	9	9	0	614	388	+226	Team	Womble
(Chile) 1959	Runners-up	2nd of 13	9	7	2	641	582	+59	Team	Bennett
(Brazil) 1963	Fourth place	4th of 13	9	6	3	754	635	+119	Team	Pinholster
(Uruguay) 1967	Fourth place	4th of 13	9	7	2	675	583	+92	Team	Fischer
(Socialist Federal Republic of Yugoslavia) 1970	Fifth place	5th of 13	9	6	3	703	577	+126	Team	Fischer
(Puerto Rico) 1974	Third place	3rd of 14	9	8	1	938	758	+180	Team	Bartow
(Philippines) 1978	Fifth place	5th of 14	10	6	4	908	843	+65	Team	Oates
(Colombia) 1982	Runners-up	2nd of 13	9	7	2	857	768	+89	Team	Weltlich
(Spain) 1986	Champions	1st of 24	10	9	1	845	712	+133	Team	Olson
(Argentina) 1990	Third place	3rd of 16	8	6	2	804	710	+94	Team	Krzyzewski
(Canada) 1994	Champions	1st of 16	8	8	0	961	659	+302	Team	Nelson
(Greece) 1998	Third place	3rd of 16	9	7	2	739	634	+105	Team	Tomjanovich
(United States) 2002	Sixth place	6th of 16	9	6	3	831	679	+152	Team	Karl
(Japan) 2006	Third place	3rd of 24	9	8	1	932	748	+184	Team	Krzyzewski
(Turkey) 2010	Champions	1st of 24	9	9	0	835	614	+221	Team	Krzyzewski
(Spain) 2014	Champions	1st of 24	9	9	0	941	644	+297	Team	Krzyzewski
(China) 2019	Seventh place	7th of 32	8	6	2	692	587	+105	Team	Popovich
(Philippines) (Japan) (Indonesia) 2023	Fourth place	4th of 32	8	5	3	836	701	+135	Team	Kerr
(Qatar) 2027	To be determined									Spoelstra
(France) 2031	To be determined									
Total	5 titles	19/21	166	134	32	14,764	12,055	+2,709		

=== AmeriCup ===
Prior to the implementation of a new FIBA competition system in 2017, the US team used different players depending on the circumstances. In 1992, 1999, 2003 and 2007, the Americans sent in NBA players as they needed to qualify for the Olympics. In 1989 and 2005, the US also used the tournament for qualification purposes but sent in either college players (in 1989 NBA players were not allowed) or NBA Development League, CBA and European leagues players (in 2005, the US team did not need to win gold in order to qualify for the World Championship). In 1993, 1997 and 2001, the US team entered the tournament without any specific purpose and was represented by CBA players in 1993 and 1997, and by junior players in 2001. In 1980, 1984, 1988, 1995, 2009, 2011, 2013 and 2015, the American team did not enter the tournament. In 2017, the US participated for the first time in ten years with a squad of NBA G League players and American professionals playing in European leagues, winning the gold medal.

FIBA AmeriCup record										Manager(s)
Year	Result	Position	Pld	W	L	PF	PA	PD	Team	Manager(s)
(Puerto Rico) 1980	Did not participate									
(Brazil) 1984	Did not participate									
(Uruguay) 1988	Did not participate									
(Mexico) 1989	Runners-up	2nd of 12	8	6	2	776	740	+36	Team	Cremins
(United States) 1992	Champions	1st of 10	6	6	0	727	418	+309	Team	Daly
(Puerto Rico) 1993	Champions	1st of 10	7	6	1	710	659	+51	Team	Thibault
(Argentina) 1995	Did not participate									
(Uruguay) 1997	Champions	1st of 10	9	8	1	845	759	+86	Team	McHone
(Puerto Rico) 1999	Champions	1st of 10	10	10	0	978	662	+316	Team	Brown
(Argentina) 2001	Tenth place	10th of 10	4	0	4	323	435	-112	Team	Sparks
(Puerto Rico) 2003	Champions	1st of 10	10	10	0	1017	708	+309	Team	Brown
(Dominican Republic) 2005	Fourth place	4th of 10	10	4	6	846	850	−4	Team	McHone
(United States) 2007	Champions	1st of 10	10	10	0	1167	772	+395	Team	Krzyzewski
(Puerto Rico) 2009	Did not participate									
(Argentina) 2011	Did not participate									
(Venezuela) 2013	Did not participate									
(Mexico) 2015	Did not participate									
(Argentina) (Colombia) (Uruguay) 2017	Champions	1st of 12	5	5	0	414	316	+98	Team	Van Gundy
(Brazil) 2022	Third place	3rd of 12	6	4	2	498	426	+72	Team	Jensen
(Nicaragua) 2025	Third place	3rd of 12	6	4	2	530	504	+26	Team	Silas
Total	7 titles	12/20	91	73	18	8,831	7,249	+1,582		

== Head-to-head competitive record ==
The following tables summarizes the all-time competitive record for the United States men's national basketball team, broken down by confederation. Competitive results are inclusive of games in the Olympic Games, FIBA Basketball World Cup, FIBA AmeriCup, and qualifying campaigns for these competitions. This record excludes the results of international friendlies or exhibitions, along with minor tournaments such as the Pan American Games, World University Games, and Goodwill Games. The United States has played competitive games against 57 current and former national teams, with the latest result, a win, coming against France on August 10, 2024, in the 2024 Olympics. The last competitive was a 2025 FIBA AmeriCup qualification matchup against Bahamas on February 23, 2025.

Key
Positive balance (more wins)
Neutral balance (wins = losses)
Negative balance (more losses)

Through Bahamas vs United States on February 23, 2025

=== Overall (378–56) ===
Opponent	Played	Won	Lost	% Won
Africa	19	19	0	100%
Americas	216	186	30	86.11%
Asia	31	31	0	100%
Europe	151	125	26	82.78%
Oceania	20	20	0	100%
Total	434	378	56	87.1%

=== Africa (19–0) ===
Opponent	Played	Won	Lost	% Won
Algeria	1	1	0	100.0%
Angola	5	5	0	100.0%
Egypt	6	6	0	100.0%
Ivory Coast	1	1	0	100.0%
Nigeria	1	1	0	100.0%
Senegal	2	2	0	100.0%
South Sudan	1	1	0	100.0%
Tunisia	2	2	0	100.0%
Total	19	19	0	100%

=== Americas (183–30) ===
Opponent	Played	Won	Lost	% Won
Argentina	32	25	7	78.1%
Bahamas	4	4	0	100.0%
Brazil	33	24	9	72.7%
Canada	23	21	2	91.3%
Chile	4	4	0	100.0%
Colombia	3	3	0	100.0%
Cuba	13	12	1	92.3%
Dominican Republic	9	8	1	88.9%
Mexico	15	12	3	80.0%
Panama	10	10	0	100.0%
Peru	3	3	0	100.0%
Puerto Rico	37	33	4	89.1%
Uruguay	18	18	0	100.0%
Virgin Islands	3	3	0	100.0%
Venezuela	10	7	3	70.0%
Total	216	186	30	86.11%

=== Asia (31–0) ===
Opponent	Played	Won	Lost	% Won
China	11	11	0	100.0%
Iran	2	2	0	100.0%
Japan	4	4	0	100.0%
Jordan	1	1	0	100.0%
Philippines	6	6	0	100.0%
South Korea	3	3	0	100.0%
Taiwan	3	3	0	100.0%
Thailand	1	1	0	100.0%
Total	31	31	0	100%

=== Europe (125–26) ===
Opponent	Played	Won	Lost	% Won
Bulgaria	2	2	0	100.0%
Croatia	4	4	0	100.0%
Czechoslovakia	7	7	0	100.0%
Czech Republic	2	2	0	100.0%
Estonia	1	1	0	100.0%
Finland	2	2	0	100.0%
France	13	11	2	84.6%
Germany	7	6	1	85.7%
Greece	8	7	1	87.5%
Hungary	2	2	0	100.0%
Israel	1	1	0	100.0%
Italy	15	13	2	86.7%
Lithuania	11	8	3	72.7%
Montenegro	1	1	0	100.0%
Poland	2	2	0	100.0%
Russia	6	5	1	83.3%
Serbia	8	6	2	75.0%
Slovenia	3	3	0	100.0%
Soviet Union	17	10	7	58.8%
Spain	19	17	2	89.5%
Switzerland	1	1	0	100.0%
Turkey	3	3	0	100.0%
Ukraine	1	1	0	100.0%
Yugoslavia	15	10	5	66.7%
Total	151	125	26	82.78%

=== Oceania (20–0) ===
Opponent	Played	Won	Lost	% Won
Australia	16	16	0	100.0%
New Zealand	4	4	0	100.0%
Total	20	20	0	100%

== Team ==
=== Current roster ===
Roster for the 2025 FIBA AmeriCup.

United States men's national basketball team roster
Players
Coaches

Pos.	No.	Name	Age – Date of birth	Height	Club	Ctr.
G	4	Jarell Eddie	33 – 30 October 1991	2.01 m (6 ft 7 in)	Peristeri Athens	(Greece)
G	5	Speedy Smith	32 – 28 January 1993	1.90 m (6 ft 3 in)	Türk Telekom	(Turkey)
G	6	Javonte Smart	26 – 3 June 1999	1.93 m (6 ft 4 in)	Osceola Magic	(United States)
PG	7	Andrew Andrews	32 – 25 May 1993	1.88 m (6 ft 2 in)	BC Wolves	(Lithuania)
SG	8	Jahmi'us Ramsey	24 – 9 June 2001	1.91 m (6 ft 3 in)	Pallacanestro Trieste	(Italy)
PG	9	Langston Galloway (C)	33 – 9 December 1991	1.88 m (6 ft 2 in)	Esenler Erokspor	(Turkey)
SG	10	Jerian Grant	32 – 9 October 1992	1.93 m (6 ft 4 in)	Panathinaikos	(Greece)
F	11	Cameron Reynolds	30 – 7 February 1995	2.03 m (6 ft 8 in)	Maroussi	(Greece)
F	12	Robert Baker	27 – 28 June 1998	2.08 m (6 ft 10 in)	New Zealand Breakers	(New Zealand)
F	13	Zach Auguste	32 – 8 July 1993	2.08 m (6 ft 10 in)	KK Cedevita Olimpija	(Slovenia)
PF	14	Jack Cooley	34 – 12 April 1991	2.06 m (6 ft 9 in)	Dinamo Sassari	(Italy)
PF	15	Tyler Cavanaugh	31 – 9 February 1994	2.06 m (6 ft 9 in)	Bahçeşehir Koleji	(Turkey)

Head coach

- (United States) Stephen Silas

Assistant coach(es)

- (Democratic Republic of the Congo) Patrick Mutombo

Legend

- (C) Team captain
- Club – describes last
  club before the tournament
- Age – describes age
  on 22 August 2025

=== Medal leaders ===
==== Olympics ====
Until 1992, there were few players who got the opportunity to compete in multiple Olympics. Unlike their seasoned and veteran counterparts from Europe, US players usually participated in a single Olympics (with Bob Kurland, Bill Hougland, and Burdette Haldorson being lone exceptions) and after winning a medal turned pro. Consequently, prior to 1992, US teams were assembled from scratch every four years. After the introduction of NBA players, US teams became more cohesive, and players often chose to compete in more than one Olympic tournament.

Player	Career	Gold	Silver	Bronze	Total (min. 2 medals)
Kevin Durant	2012–2024				4
Carmelo Anthony	2004–2016				4
LeBron James	2004–2012, 2024				4
David Robinson	1988–1996				3
Bob Kurland	1948–1952				2
Bill Hougland	1952–1956				2
Burdette Haldorson	1956–1960				2
Michael Jordan	1984, 1992				2
Patrick Ewing	1984, 1992				2
Chris Mullin	1984, 1992				2
Charles Barkley	1992–1996				2
Scottie Pippen	1992–1996				2
Karl Malone	1992–1996				2
John Stockton	1992–1996				2
Gary Payton	1996–2000				2
Jason Kidd	2000, 2008				2
Deron Williams	2008–2012				2
Kobe Bryant	2008–2012				2
Chris Paul	2008–2012				2
Anthony Davis	2012, 2024				2
Draymond Green	2016–2020				2
Jrue Holiday	2020–2024				2
Jayson Tatum	2020–2024				2
Bam Adebayo	2020–2024				2
Devin Booker	2020–2024				2
Mitch Richmond	1988, 1996				2
Dwyane Wade	2004–2008				2

==== World Cup ====
Player	Career	Gold	Silver	Bronze	Total (min. 2 medals)
Rudy Gay	2010–2014				2
Derrick Rose	2010–2014				2
Stephen Curry	2010–2014				2
Alonzo Mourning	1990–1994				2
Brad Miller	1998, 2006				2

==== AmeriCup ====
Player	Career	Gold	Silver	Bronze	Total (min. 2 medals)
Jason Kidd	1999, 2003, 2007				3
Reggie Jordan	1993, 1997				2
Elton Brand	1999, 2003				2
Tim Duncan	1999, 2003				2
Christian Laettner	1989–1992				2
Gary Payton	1989, 1999				2

== See also ==
- United States men's national under-19 basketball team
- United States men's national under-17 basketball team
- United States men's national 3x3 team
- United States women's national basketball team
- United States women's national under-19 basketball team
- United States women's national under-17 basketball team
- United States women's national 3x3 team
- USA Basketball
- Basketball in the United States
