= 1988 United States men's Olympic basketball team =

- Head coach: John Thompson
- Scoring leader: (United States) Dan Majerle 14.1
- Rebounding leader: (United States) David Robinson 6.9
- Assists leader: (United States) Mitch Richmond 2.1

The 1988 United States men's Olympic basketball team represented the United States at the 1988 Summer Olympics in Seoul, South Korea. The team's head coach was John Thompson, of Georgetown University. Team USA won the tournament's bronze medal, their lowest finish to that point in any Olympic basketball tournament.

This was the last Olympic basketball tournament in which NBA players were not allowed to participate; FIBA instituted a rule change in 1989 that lifted that restriction, leading to the dominance of 1992's Dream Team.

== Roster ==
| Name | Position | Height | Weight | Age | Team/School | Home Town |
|---|---|---|---|---|---|---|
| Willie Anderson | G | 6'7" | 190 | 22 | Georgia | Atlanta, Georgia |
| Stacey Augmon | F | 6'7" | 192 | 20 | UNLV | Pasadena, California |
| Bimbo Coles | G | 6'1" | 175 | 20 | Virginia Tech | Lewisburg, West Virginia |
| Jeff Grayer | G | 6'6" | 206 | 22 | Iowa State | Flint, Michigan |
| Hersey Hawkins | G | 6'2" | 192 | 21 | Bradley | Chicago, Illinois |
| Dan Majerle | G/F | 6'5" | 225 | 23 | Central Michigan | Traverse City, Michigan |
| Danny Manning | F | 6'9" | 231 | 22 | Kansas | Lawrence, Kansas |
| J. R. Reid | F | 6'9" | 206 | 20 | North Carolina | Virginia Beach, Virginia |
| Mitch Richmond | G | 6'4" | 222 | 23 | Kansas State | Lauderdale Lakes, Florida |
| David Robinson | C | 7'0" | 226 | 23 | Navy | Woodbridge, Virginia |
| Charles D. Smith | F | 6'9" | 228 | 23 | Pittsburgh | Bridgeport, Connecticut |
| Charles Smith | G | 6'0" | 149 | 20 | Georgetown | Washington, DC |

== Team staff members ==
- Head Coach: John Thompson of Georgetown University
- Assistant coach: George Raveling of the University of Southern California
- Assistant coach: Craig Esherick of Georgetown University
- Assistant coach: Mary Fenlon of Georgetown University
- Manager: Bill Stein of St. Peter's College, in New Jersey
- Team physician: James Hill of Chicago, Illinois
- Athletic trainer: Troy Young of Arizona State University

== Results ==
- United States beat Spain, 97–53
- United States beat Canada, 76–70
- United States beat Brazil, 102–87
- United States beat China (PRC), 108–57
- United States beat Egypt, 102–35
- United States beat Puerto Rico, 94–57
- Soviet Union beat United States, 82–76
- United States beat Australia, 78–49

The team did not reach the gold-medal game for the first time in its history. They beat Australia in the bronze-medal game 78–49.

== Final standings ==
1. Soviet Union (7–1)
2. Yugoslavia (6–2)
3. United States (7–1)
4. Australia (4–4)
5. Brazil (5–3)
6. Canada (3–5)
7. Puerto Rico (4–4)
8. Spain (4–4)
9. South Korea (2–5)
10. Central African Republic (2–5)
11. China (2–5)
12. Egypt (0–7)

== See also ==
- Basketball at the 1988 Summer Olympics
