= 1972 United States men's Olympic basketball team =

- Head coach: Hank Iba
- Scoring leader: (United States) Tom Henderson / Dwight Jones 9.2
- Rebounding leader: (United States) Dwight Jones 5.7

The 1972 United States men's Olympic basketball team represented the United States at the 1972 Summer Olympics in Munich, Germany. Led by Tom Henderson and Dwight Jones, the team would go on to win the silver medal. In the final game of the Olympics, Team USA controversially lost for the first time in Summer Olympic Games competition, and ended their 63-game winning streak (the streak began in the 1936 Summer Olympics). The Soviet team that defeated the Americans featured international veterans, who had been playing together for years in their domestic pro league and international tournaments, while the American team was barred from sending NBA players, and used collegians instead.

== Roster ==
Name	Position	Height	Weight	Age	Team/School	Home Town
Mike Bantom	F	6'9"	205	20	St. Joseph's University	Philadelphia, Pennsylvania
Jim Brewer	F/C	6'9"	220	20	University of Minnesota	Maywood, Illinois
Tommy Burleson	C	7'2"	225	20	North Carolina State University	Newland, North Carolina
Doug Collins	G	6'6"	180	21	Illinois State University	Benton, Illinois
Kenny Davis	G	6'1"	180	23	Georgetown College	Monticello, Kentucky
James Forbes	F	6'7"	200	20	University of Texas at El Paso	El Paso, Texas
Tom Henderson	G	6'2"	190	20	San Jacinto College	Bronx, New York
Bobby Jones	C/F	6'8"	205	20	University of North Carolina at Chapel Hill	Charlotte, North Carolina
Dwight Jones	C	6'8"	205	20	University of Houston	Houston, Texas
Kevin Joyce	G	6'3"	190	21	University of South Carolina	Queens, New York
Tom McMillen	F	6'11"	210	22	University of Maryland, College Park	Mansfield, Pennsylvania
Ed Ratleff	F/G	6'6"	190	22	California State University, Long Beach	Columbus, Ohio

== Coaches ==
- Head Coach: Henry "Hank" Iba – Oklahoma State
- Assistant Coach: John Bach – Penn State
- Assistant Coach: Don Haskins – Texas El-Paso

== 1972 USA results ==
- United States beat Czechoslovakia, 66–35
- United States beat Australia, 81–55
- United States beat Cuba, 67–48
- United States beat Brazil, 67–54
- United States beat Egypt, 96–31
- United States beat Spain, 72–56
- United States beat Japan, 99–33
- United States beat Italy, 68–38
- Soviet Union beat United States, 51–50

== 1972 Olympic games final standings ==
- 1. Soviet Union (9–0)
- 2. United States (8–1)
- 3. Cuba (7–2)
- 4. Italy (5–4)
- 5. Yugoslavia (7–2)
- 6. Puerto Rico (6–3)
- 7. Brazil (5–4)
- 8. Czechoslovakia (4–5)
- 9. Australia (5–4)
- 10. Poland (3–6)
- 11. Spain (4–5)
- 12. West Germany (3–6)
- 13. Philippines (3–6)
- 14. Japan (2–7)
- 15. Senegal (0–8)
- 16. Egypt (0–8)

== See also ==
- Basketball at the 1972 Summer Olympics
