= 1992 United States men's Olympic basketball team =

U.S. Olympic team (1992)

- Head coach: Chuck Daly
- Scoring leader: (United States) Charles Barkley 18.0
- Rebounding leader: (United States) Karl Malone 5.3 (United States) Patrick Ewing 5.3
- Assists leader: (United States) Scottie Pippen 5.9

The men's national basketball team of the United States competed at the 1992 Summer Olympics in Barcelona, Spain, and won the gold medal. Nicknamed the "Dream Team", it was the first American Olympic team to include active professional players from the National Basketball Association (NBA). Team USA defeated its opponents by an average of 44 points during the tournament. The team has often been described as the greatest sports team ever assembled.

The team was collectively inducted into the U.S. Olympic Hall of Fame in 2009, the Naismith Memorial Basketball Hall of Fame in 2010, and the FIBA Hall of Fame in 2017. The Naismith Hall of Fame calls the team "the greatest collection of basketball talent on the planet". In addition to the team induction, 11 players and three coaches have been inducted individually into the Naismith Hall of Fame.

== Forming the team ==
=== Background ===
Before the 1992 Olympics, FIBA rules barred players from the United States' National Basketball Association from participating in Olympic tournaments, and only amateurs were eligible for the U.S. Olympic teams, which were composed of collegiate and, especially in the 1950s, AAU players. Other countries used their best players from their domestic professional leagues. In the 1988 Summer Olympics, the Americans lost to the USSR and settled for bronze, their worst finish in the history of the Games.

On April 7, 1989, at a special congress in Munich after the 1988–89 FIBA European Champions Cup finals, FIBA delegates voted, 56-13, to allow professional basketball players to participate in its international events, including the World Cup and the Olympics. The Amateur Basketball Association of the United States of America (ABAUSA, renamed USA Basketball after the vote) voted against the move due to "colleges and high schools that make up most of [ABAUSA's] constituency [opposing] it." A Soviet proposal to limit the national teams to only two NBA players for the first few years was unanimously rejected.

The decision led to professional players, particularly those from the NBA, dominating the sport at the highest levels of international competition. The change also warded off competition from the Goodwill Games, the biggest rival of the Olympics at the time, which was seeking to bring professional players into its basketball events.

=== Selections ===
USA Basketball asked the NBA to supply players for its 1992 roster; the league was initially unenthusiastic about this idea.

The notion that the NBA wanted to redeem the 1988 loss? Patently wrong. From our view, we were stuck with playing in the Olympics. We didn't see it becoming the phenomenon that it became.

— NBA Commissioner David Stern on the NBA's initial lack of enthusiasm for playing the Olympics

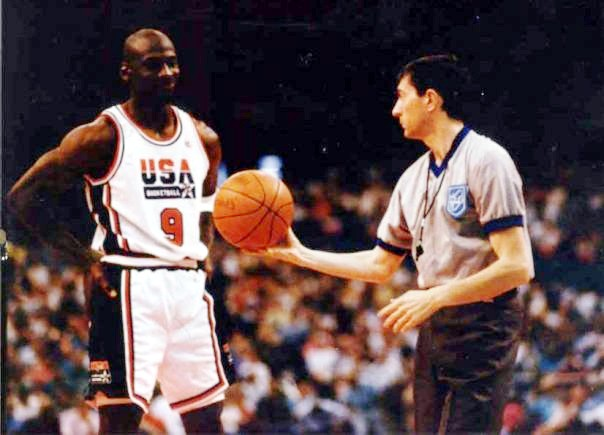
Michael Jordan was offered a co-captainship but he deferred to Bird and Johnson

The first ten players for the team were selected on September 21, 1991: Michael Jordan and Scottie Pippen of the Chicago Bulls, John Stockton and Karl Malone of the Utah Jazz, Magic Johnson of the Los Angeles Lakers, Larry Bird of the Boston Celtics, Patrick Ewing of the New York Knicks, Chris Mullin of the Golden State Warriors, David Robinson of the San Antonio Spurs, and Charles Barkley of the Philadelphia 76ers.

On the cover of its issue of February 18, 1991, Sports Illustrated labeled the forthcoming American roster as the "Dream Team".

On May 12, 1992, Clyde Drexler of the Portland Trail Blazers was chosen over Isiah Thomas of the Detroit Pistons for the final professional roster spot. As an acknowledgment to the previous amateur system, the U.S. basketball committee decided to include one collegiate player on the team: Christian Laettner of Duke University was added on May 12, 1992, chosen over Louisiana State University's Shaquille O'Neal.

Most of the players on the team were at or near the peaks of their NBA careers. Bird had back trouble, but was selected due to the team's historic nature. Robinson had played with the 1988 Olympic team and was eager to earn a gold medal at Barcelona.

Johnson had retired from the Lakers in November 1991 after testing positive for HIV, the virus that causes AIDS. His teammates expected Johnson to die from the disease, and he later described his selection for the Olympics as "almost like a life saver", evidence that he could still overcome the illness and live a productive life. The Australian Olympic delegation threatened to boycott the games in protest of Johnson's presence, fearing that he might infect other athletes. Their threats backfired, however, as Johnson received even more public support. Ewing, Jordan, and Mullin had won gold at the 1984 games; Malone had not made the team and saw his non-selection in 1984 as a challenge.

Jordan declined head coach Chuck Daly's suggestion that Jordan serve as the public face of the team, and Bird and Johnson were selected as co-captains. Over the previous 13 NBA seasons leading up to the 1992 Olympics, these three superstars had won 10 NBA championships and received seven NBA Finals Most Valuable Player (MVP) awards and nine regular-season MVP awards.

==== Isiah Thomas left off team ====
There was speculation that Isiah Thomas was not part of the team because Jordan would participate only if Thomas was not on the roster. At the time, it was widely believed that Jordan did not like Thomas because he was seen as the "ring leader" of the Detroit Pistons of the late 1980s and early 1990s; nicknamed the "Bad Boys", the team employed overtly physical tactics against Jordan in the NBA Playoffs. In his 2012 book Dream Team, author Jack McCallum quotes Jordan as saying to Team USA selection committee member Rod Thorn, "Rod, I don't want to play if Isiah Thomas is on the team". In 2020, Thorn and Jordan denied directly mentioning Thomas's name in discussions. According to Jordan in the documentary series The Last Dance, he asked Thorn, "Who's all playing?" to which Thorn responded, "The guy you're thinking about is not going to be playing."

After the selection of the first ten members of the team, Johnson released an official statement in support of Thomas, but years later it was discovered that his support was less than enthusiastic. In the book When the Game Was Ours, Johnson said, "Isiah killed his own chances when it came to the Olympics. Nobody on that team wanted to play with him."

==== Laettner's selection over O'Neal ====
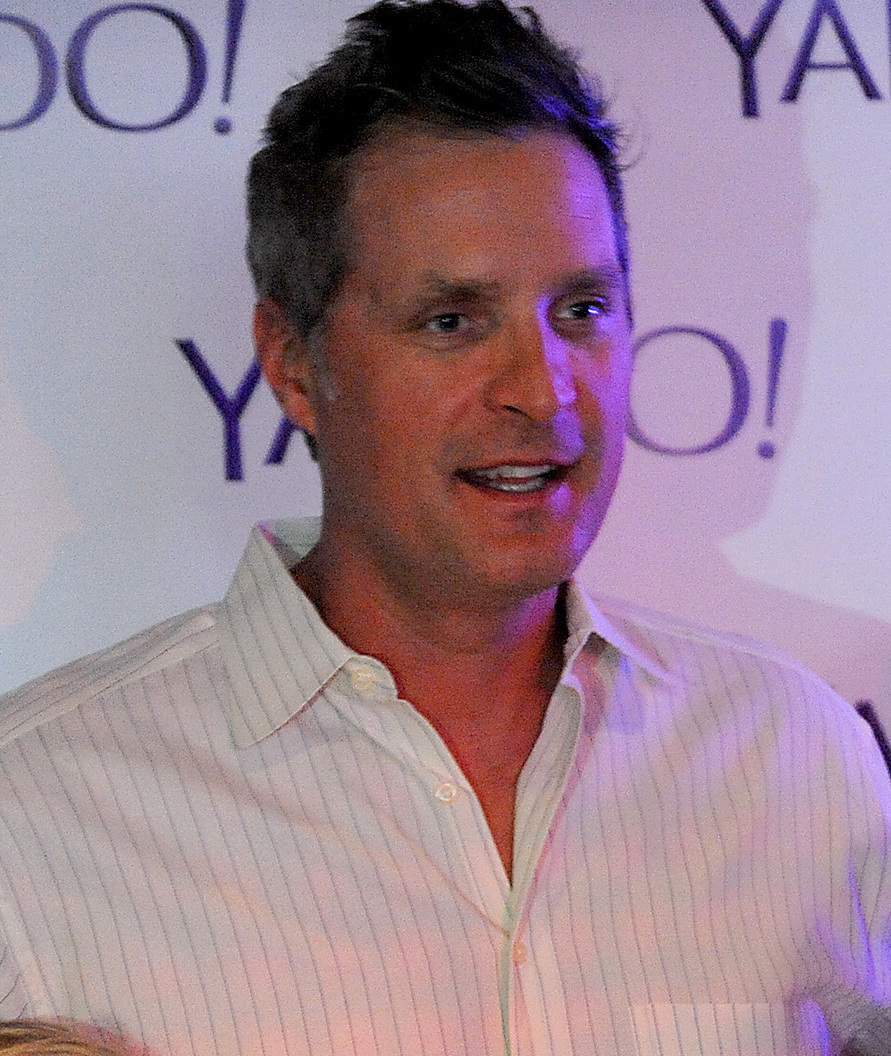
Christian Laettner (pictured in 2014) was chosen to represent college athletics.

The selection committee considered several college players, including Harold Miner, Jimmy Jackson, and Alonzo Mourning in addition to Shaquille O'Neal and Christian Laettner. O'Neal was the number-one pick in the 1992 NBA draft, but Laettner's Duke Blue Devils teams won consecutive National Championships in 1991 and 1992. Coached by Mike Krzyzewski, who also was a first-time assistant coach for the Olympic program, Laettner was the Naismith College Player of the Year and scored the game-winning basket as time expired in the 1992 NCAA Eastern Regional final. Although O'Neal was a two-time Consensus NCAA First Team All-American in 1991 and 1992, his team lost in the second round of the 1992 NCAA men's tournament. Laettner's college success and coach's endorsement ultimately secured his position on the team.

== Success on the court ==
=== Early scrimmages ===
To help the team prepare for the Olympics, a squad of the best NCAA college players was formed to scrimmage them. USA Basketball selected players whose style of play, it hoped, would resemble that of the Europeans the Dream Team would face. Members included the penetrating guard Bobby Hurley, all-around players Grant Hill and Penny Hardaway, outside shooter Allan Houston, and the tough Chris Webber and Eric Montross. Hill and Hardaway would play for the 1996 national team, and Houston on the 2000 team.

The Dream Team first gathered at Main Gym on the campus of the University of California, San Diego, in late June, astounding and intimidating the collegians who watched them practice. However, on June 24, the Dream Team lost to the NCAA team, 62–54, after underestimating the opposition. Daly intentionally limited Jordan's playing time and made non-optimal substitutions; assistant coach Mike Krzyzewski later said that the head coach "threw the game" to teach the NBA players that they could be beaten. The teams played again the following day, with the Olympians winning decisively in the rematch. Some of the college players visited Jordan's hotel room afterward and asked their hero for his personal items as souvenirs.

=== Tournament of the Americas ===
The Dream Team made its international debut on June 28 at the Tournament of the Americas, an Olympic qualifying event in Portland, Oregon. The team defeated Cuba 136–57, prompting Cuban coach Miguel Calderón Gómez to say, "You can't cover the sun with your finger." Marv Albert, who announced the game, recalled that "it was as if [the Americans] were playing a high school team, or grade school team. They were so overwhelming...a blowout after blowout." The Cubans were the first of many opponents who were more interested in taking photos with the Americans than playing them. The next five games were also easy victories for Team USA, which ended the tournament on July 5 with a 127–80 victory over Venezuela in the championship game to win the tournament and be one of four Americas squads to qualify for the Olympics.

=== Olympics ===
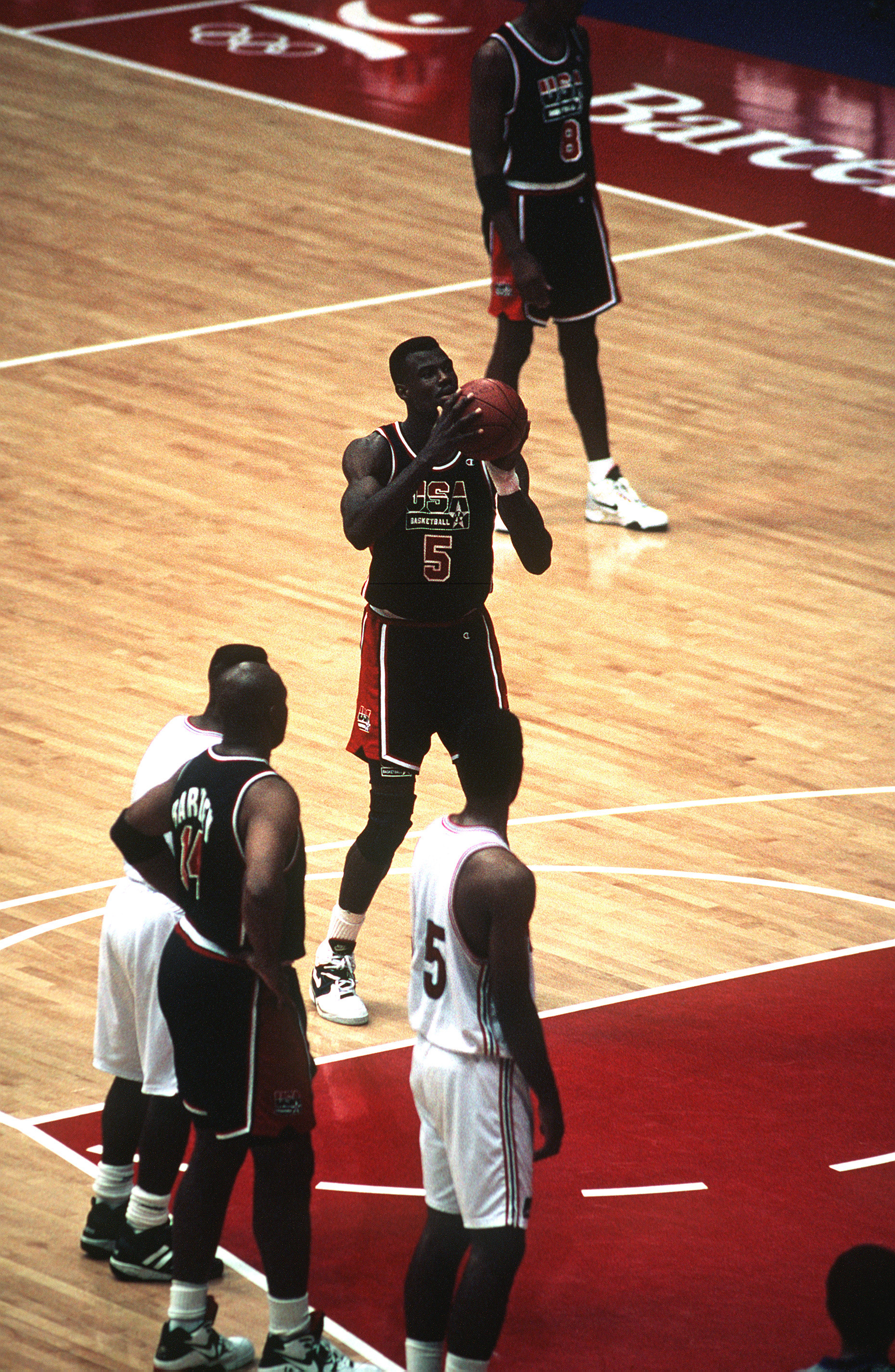
David Robinson taking a free throw

The team trained for the Olympics in Monaco for six days, practicing two hours a day and playing exhibition games against other national teams. During their time away from the court, the squad spent time enjoying the nude beaches, Monte Carlo's casinos, and dining with royalty. There was no curfew; as Daly stated, "I'm not putting in a curfew because I'd have to adhere to it, and Jimmy'z [a noted Monte Carlo nightclub] doesn't open until midnight."

For one scrimmage, the group divided into two teams: Blue (led by Johnson, with Barkley, Robinson, Mullin, and Laettner) and White (led by Jordan, with Malone, Ewing, Pippen, and Bird). Drexler and Stockton did not play because of injuries. (Note: A 2012 NBA TV documentary covers this scrimmage, but the segment mixes video clips from other scrimmages as well.) Daly told the teams to play "All you got now. All you got." White won, 40 to 36, in what Jordan recalled as "the best game I was ever in" and Sports Illustrated later called "the Greatest Game Nobody Ever Saw".

Because of security concerns due to the team's celebrity, the Dream Team did not stay in the Olympic Village. The Olympic Village had only four guards at the gate when the team arrived to pick up their credentials; one of the guards, upon seeing the Dream Team, grabbed his camera and his child while the team members were mobbed by other Olympic athletes. Daly also stated that the beds in the Village were too short to allow his tall players to get proper rest.

As a result, the team stayed at Barcelona's Hotel Ambassador, where USA Basketball occupied 80 of the hotel's 98 rooms. Fans were not allowed to enter the lobby, but did gather outside the hotel, hoping to see their favorite players. "It was like Elvis and the Beatles put together," Daly said. Opposing basketball players and athletes from other sports often asked to have photographs taken with the players.

In an interview years later, Charles Barkley recounted that "we got death threats". Despite that assertion, Barkley walked around the city alone. When asked where his bodyguards were, he held up his fists and answered, "This is my security."

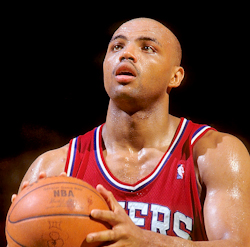
Charles Barkley proved controversial due to his aggressive gameplay and trash talking. He ended up being the highest-scoring member of the team.

Jordan was the only player who studied the opposition, carefully watching game tapes. He and the other Americans enjoyed the opportunity to get to know each other in a casual setting, often playing cards all night and, for Jordan, playing several rounds of golf daily with little rest.

Opposing teams were overwhelmed by the Americans, losing by an average of 43.8 points per game. This was the second-largest Olympic Games point differential, surpassed only by the 53.5 point-per-game margin achieved by the 1956 US Men's Basketball Team. The Dream Team was the first to score more than 100 points in every game. Its 117.3 average was more than 15 points higher than that of the 1960 US team. Johnson later recalled, "I look to my right, there's Michael Jordan...I look to my left, there's Charles Barkley or Larry Bird...I didn't know who to throw the ball to!"

In a press conference before the team's first Olympic game against Angola, Barkley quipped, "I don't know anything about Angola. But Angola's in trouble." Herlander Coimbra of Angola recalled that "those guys were on another level—a galaxy far, far away". During the game, Barkley elbowed Coimbra in the chest and was unapologetic after the game, claiming he was hit first. Barkley was called for an intentional foul on the play. Coimbra's resulting free throw was the only point scored by Angola during a 46–1 run by the US.

The U.S. team won, 116–48, but its global reputation was damaged by Barkley's elbow. After the game, Jordan said, "There just wasn't any place for it. We were dominating the game. It created mixed feelings, it caused a mixed reaction about the U.S. There's already some negative feelings about us." The incident changed the narrative; instead of the Americans being viewed as a highly skilled team beating an underdog, some viewed them as bullies.

Daly started Jordan in every game, and Johnson started in five of the six games he played, missing two games because of knee problems. Pippen, Bird, Mullin, Robinson, Ewing, Malone, and Barkley rotated in the other starting spots. Barkley was the Dream Team's leading scorer during the Olympics, averaging 18.0 points per game. The player-selection committee had been unsure about including him, worried that he would not represent the United States well.

The closest of the eight matches was Team USA's 117–85 victory over Croatia in the gold medal game. Croatia, participating as an independent nation in the Olympics for the first time since its separation from the former Yugoslavia, briefly led the Dream Team by a score of 25–23 in the first half. By the end of the game, Team USA had pulled away and Stockton agreed to a Croatian player's plea not to shoot. Pippen and Jordan aggressively sought the opportunity to guard Toni Kukoč of Croatia. He had just signed a contract with the Bulls for more money than Pippen, who believed that the team's negotiation with the Croatian had delayed his own contract. Tired of hearing about Kukoč's talent, Pippen and Jordan agreed to, as Jordan later said, "not...let this guy do anything against us." McCallum described the two Bulls as "rabid dogs" against Kukoč. Croatia had lost to the Dream Team 103–70 in their first game. The only team besides Croatia to hold the margin under 40 points was Puerto Rico, which lost 115–77 in the quarterfinals.

== Legacy ==
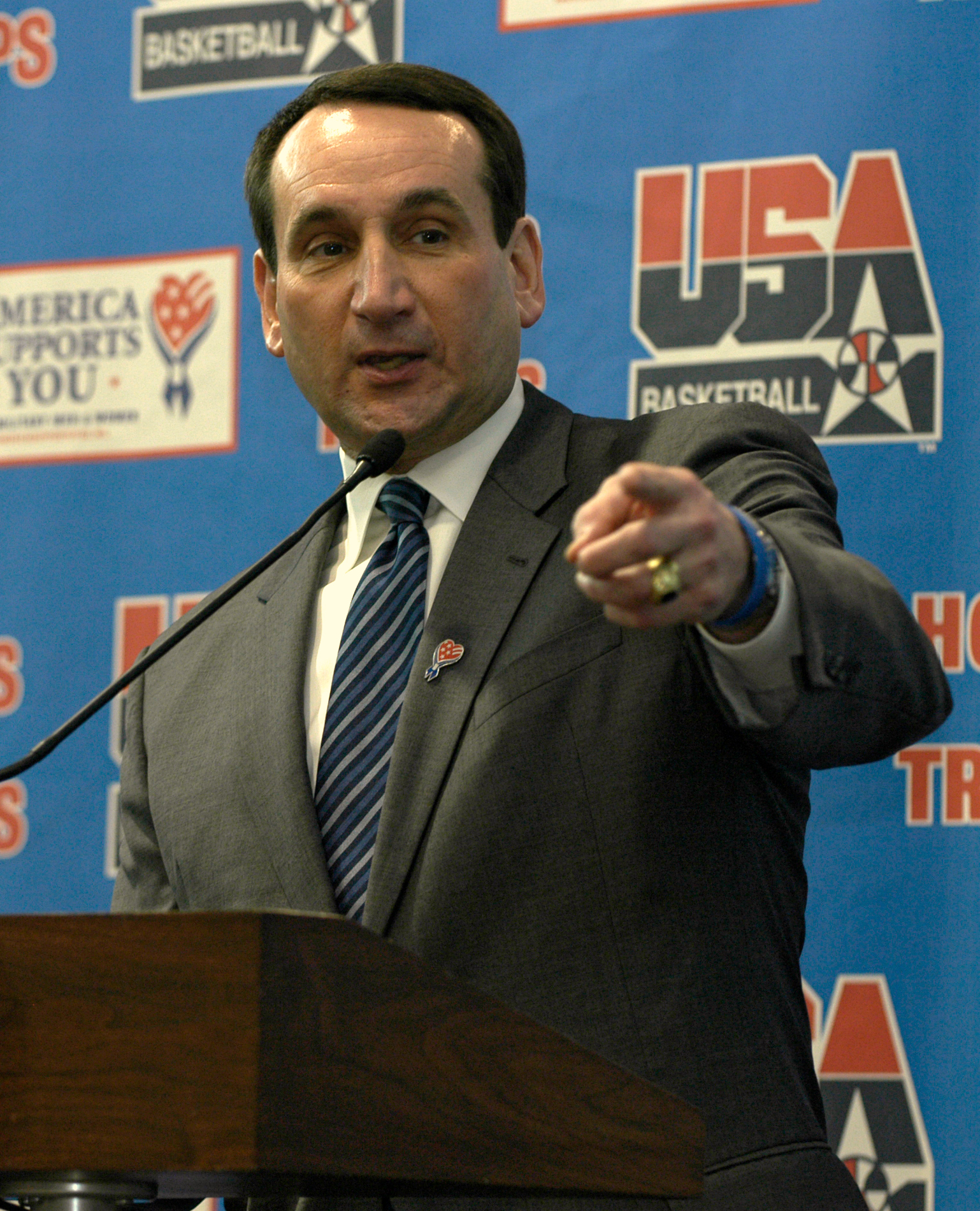
Mike Krzyzewski returned to coach the United States men's basketball several times after the 1992 Olympics.

Sports Illustrated later stated that the Dream Team was "arguably the most dominant squad ever assembled in any sport" and compared it to "Johnny Cash at Folsom Prison, the Allman Brothers at the Fillmore East, Santana at Woodstock." In 2009, the team was elected to the U.S. Olympic & Paralympic Hall of Fame. The following year, the team was elected to the Naismith Memorial Basketball Hall of Fame. It was elected to the FIBA Hall of Fame in 2017.

Barkley later said, "I don't think there's anything better to representing your country. I don't think anything in my life can come close to that." Bird called the medal ceremony and the playing of "The Star-Spangled Banner" "the ultimate experience". Johnson said, "The 92 Dream Team was the greatest moment of my life in terms of basketball, bar none." Jordan said that the biggest benefit for him from the Olympics was that he learned more about his teammates' weaknesses. His Chicago Bulls teams later defeated Barkley, Malone, and Stockton's teams in three NBA finals. As of 2014, 11 of the 12 players on the roster (all except Laettner) and three of the four coaches (all except Carlesimo) have been elected to the Hall of Fame as individuals.

Global interest in basketball soared due to the Dream Team. International Olympic Committee president Juan Antonio Samaranch stated that "the most important aspect of the [Barcelona] Games has been the resounding success of the basketball tournament, as we've witnessed the best basketball in the world." Daly said of the opposing teams "They'll go home and for the rest of their lives be able to tell their kids, 'I played against Michael Jordan and Magic Johnson and Larry Bird.' And the more they play against our best players, the more confident they're going to get". Subsequently, the number of international players in the NBA rose. On opening day of the 1991–92 season, NBA rosters included 23 international players from 18 countries. At the start of the 2011–12 season, there were 74 players from 35 countries.

== Roster ==
USA Basketball Men's National Team roster
Players

Pos.	#	Name	Age	Height	Weight	From
PF	4	Laettner, Christian	22	6 ft 11 in (2.11 m)	235 lb (107 kg)	Duke Blue Devils
C	5	Robinson, David	26	7 ft 1 in (2.16 m)	235 lb (107 kg)	San Antonio Spurs
C	6	Ewing, Patrick	29	7 ft 0 in (2.13 m)	240 lb (110 kg)	New York Knicks
SF	7	Bird, Larry	35	6 ft 9 in (2.06 m)	220 lb (100 kg)	Boston Celtics
SF	8	Pippen, Scottie	26	6 ft 8 in (2.03 m)	210 lb (95 kg)	Chicago Bulls
SG	9	Jordan, Michael	29	6 ft 6 in (1.98 m)	198 lb (90 kg)	Chicago Bulls
SG	10	Drexler, Clyde	30	6 ft 7 in (2.01 m)	222 lb (101 kg)	Portland Trail Blazers
PF	11	Malone, Karl	28	6 ft 9 in (2.06 m)	256 lb (116 kg)	Utah Jazz
PG	12	Stockton, John	30	6 ft 1 in (1.85 m)	175 lb (79 kg)	Utah Jazz
SF	13	Mullin, Chris	28	6 ft 7 in (2.01 m)	215 lb (98 kg)	Golden State Warriors
PF	14	Barkley, Charles	29	6 ft 6 in (1.98 m)	250 lb (110 kg)	Phoenix Suns
PG	15	Johnson, Magic	32	6 ft 9 in (2.06 m)	220 lb (100 kg)	Los Angeles Lakers (Note: By the time the roster was announced, Johnson had already retired from professional basketball.)

Coaches

Head coach

- Chuck Daly

Assistant coach(es)

- P. J. Carlesimo
- Mike Krzyzewski
- Lenny Wilkens

Legend:

- From – describes teams affiliated
  during the Olympics

== Tournament of the Americas results ==
The team was undefeated, with their closest margin of victory being 38 points over Puerto Rico.

Tournament of the Americas results
Game	Date	USA points	Opponent points	Opponent	Point differential
1	June 28, 1992	136	57	Cuba	79
2	June 29, 1992	105	61	Canada	44
3	June 30, 1992	112	52	Panama	60
4	July 1, 1992	128	87	Argentina	41
5	July 3, 1992	119	81	Puerto Rico	38
6	July 5, 1992	127	80	Venezuela (gold medal game)	47

=== Tournament statistics ===
Player tournament statistics
Player	GP	FGM	FGA	FG%	3PM	3PA	3P%	FTM	FTA	FT%	REB/AVG	PTS/AVG	AST	BLK	STL
Charles Barkley	6	34	58	.586	2	5	.400	28	33	.848	40/6.7	98/16.3	10	1	12
Larry Bird	2	8	11	.727	3	4	.750	0	0	.000	7/3.5	19/9.5	2	0	3
Clyde Drexler	5	27	39	.692	5	11	.455	10	12	.833	13/2.6	69/13.8	33	2	5
Patrick Ewing	5	27	43	.628	0	0	.000	5	8	.625	26/5.2	59/11.8	2	10	6
Magic Johnson	6	19	34	.559	3	9	.333	17	20	.850	25/4.2	58/9.7	54	0	7
Michael Jordan	6	29	53	.547	9	23	.391	9	12	.750	23/3.8	76/12.7	30	5	11
Christian Laettner	6	18	31	.581	3	7	.429	5	8	.625	16/2.7	44/7.3	2	0	3
Karl Malone	6	33	53	.623	0	0	.000	23	39	.590	35/5.8	89/14.8	9	4	5
Chris Mullin	6	31	49	.633	15	30	.500	9	14	.643	18/3.0	86/14.3	14	1	9
Scottie Pippen	6	20	30	.667	2	6	.333	6	9	.667	26/4.3	48/8.0	37	2	8
David Robinson	6	32	42	.762	0	0	.000	7	13	.538	32/5.3	71/11.8	5	11	5
John Stockton	2	5	6	.833	0	1	.000	0	0	.000	1/0.5	10/5.0	12	0	1

== Olympics results ==
The team was again undefeated, with their closest outing being the 32-point victory over Croatia for the gold medal.

July 26, 1992 Group A, Game 1	Angola	48–116	United States	Barcelona, Spain
16:30 (CEST)	Scoring by half: 16–64, 32–52
	Pts: Macedo, 10; Rebs: Conceição, 7 Asts: Conceição, 2	Boxscore	Pts: Barkley, 24; Rebs: Barkley, 6 Asts: Johnson, 10	Arena: Pavelló Olímpic de Badalona
Note: Point differential: 68, tournament largest

July 27, 1992 Group A, Game 2	Croatia	70–103	United States	Barcelona, Spain
20:30 (CEST)	Scoring by half: 37–54, 33–49
	Pts: Petrović, 19; Rebs: Rađa, 8 Asts: Kukoč, 5	Boxscore	Pts: Jordan, 21; Rebs: Malone, 5 Asts: Pippen, 9	Arena: Pavelló Olímpic de Badalona
Note: Point differential: 33

July 29, 1992 Group A, Game 3	United States	111–68	Germany	Barcelona, Spain
20:30 (CEST)	Scoring by half: 58–23, 53–45
	Pts: Bird, 19; Rebs: Malone, 5 Asts: Jordan, 12	Boxscore	Pts: Schrempf, 15; Rebs: Schrempf, 8 Asts: Rödl, 2	Arena: Pavelló Olímpic de Badalona
Note: Point differential: 43

July 31, 1992 Group A, Game 4	United States	127–83	Brazil	Barcelona, Spain
22:30 (CEST)	Scoring by half: 60–41, 67–42
	Pts: Barkley, 30; Rebs: Ewing, 9 Asts: Drexler, 10	Boxscore	Pts: Schmidt, 24; Rebs: dos Santos, 9 Asts: Ponikwar de Souza, 7	Arena: Pavelló Olímpic de Badalona
Note: Point differential: 44

August 2, 1992 Group A, Game 5	Spain	81–122	United States	Barcelona, Spain
22:30 (CEST)	Scoring by half: 35–65, 46–57
	Pts: Jiménez, 23; Rebs: Andreu, 7 Asts: Jiménez, 6	Boxscore	Pts: Barkley, 20; Rebs: Ewing, 10; Asts: Pippen, 9	Arena: Pavelló Olímpic de Badalona
Note: Point differential: 41

August 4, 1992 Quarterfinals	United States	115–77	Puerto Rico	Barcelona, Spain
22:30 (CEST)	Scoring by half: 67–40, 48–37
	Pts: Mullin, 21; Rebs: Laettner, 8 Asts: Pippen, 8	Boxscore	Pts: Ortiz, 13; Rebs: Ortiz, 8 Asts: Carter, 4	Arena: Pavelló Olímpic de Badalona
Note: Point differential: 38

August 6, 1992 Semifinals	Lithuania	76–127	United States	Barcelona, Spain
22:30 (CEST)	Scoring by half: 30–49, 46–78
	Pts: Marčiulionis, 20; Rebs: Sabonis, 8 Asts: Marčiulionis, 8	Boxscore	Pts: Jordan, 21; Rebs: Robinson, 8 Asts: Johnson, 8	Arena: Pavelló Olímpic de Badalona
Note: Point differential: 51

August 8, 1992 Gold medal game	Croatia	85–117	United States	Barcelona, Spain
22:00 (CEST)	Scoring by half: 42–56, 43–61
	Pts: Petrović, 24; Rebs: Rađa, 6 Asts: Kukoč, 9	Boxscore	Pts: Jordan, 22; Rebs: Ewing, 6 Asts: Johnson, 6	Arena: Pavelló Olímpic de Badalona
Note: Point differential: 32, tournament closest

=== Olympic statistics ===
Olympic player statistics
Player	GP	GS	FGM	FGA	FG%	3PM	3PA	3P%	FTM	FTA	FT%	PPG	RPG	APG
Charles Barkley	8	4	59	83	.711	7	8	.875	19	26	.731	18.0	4.1	2.4
Larry Bird	8	3	25	48	.521	9	27	.333	8	10	.800	8.4	3.8	1.8
Clyde Drexler	8	3	37	64	.578	6	21	.286	4	10	.400	10.5	3.0	3.6
Patrick Ewing	8	4	33	53	.623	0	0	.000	10	16	.625	9.5	5.3	0.4
Magic Johnson	6	5	17	30	.567	6	13	.462	8	10	.800	8.0	2.3	5.5
Michael Jordan	8	8	51	113	.451	4	19	.211	13	19	.684	14.9	2.4	4.8
Christian Laettner	8	0	9	20	.450	2	6	.333	18	20	.900	4.8	2.5	0.4
Karl Malone	8	4	40	62	.645	0	0	.000	24	32	.750	13.0	5.3	1.1
Chris Mullin	8	2	39	63	.619	14	26	.538	11	14	.786	12.9	1.6	3.6
Scottie Pippen	8	3	28	47	.596	5	13	.385	11	15	.733	9.0	2.1	5.9
David Robinson	8	4	27	47	.574	0	0	.000	18	26	.692	9.0	4.1	0.9
John Stockton	4	0	4	8	.500	1	2	.500	2	3	.667	2.8	0.3	2.0

== See also ==
- Team USA Basketball (video game)
