= 2000 United States men's Olympic basketball team =

- Head coach: Rudy Tomjanovich
- Scoring leader: (United States) Vince Carter 14.8
- Rebounding leader: (United States) Kevin Garnett 9.1
- Assists leader: (United States) Jason Kidd 4.4

The men's national basketball team of the United States won the gold medal at the 2000 Summer Olympics in Sydney, Australia. They defeated France by a score of 85–75 in the gold medal game. Team USA won gold for the 12th time in 14 Olympic basketball tournaments.

== Roster ==
United States men's national basketball team – 2000 Summer Olympics roster
Players
Coaches

Pos.	No.	Name	Age – Date of birth	Height	Club	Ctr.
G	4	Steve Smith	31 – March 31, 1969	6 ft 7 in (2.01 m)	Portland Trail Blazers	(United States)
G	5	Jason Kidd (C)	27 – May 23, 1973	6 ft 4 in (1.93 m)	Phoenix Suns	(United States)
G	6	Allan Houston	29 – April 20, 1971	6 ft 5 in (1.96 m)	New York Knicks	(United States)
C	7	Alonzo Mourning (C)	30 – February 8, 1970	6 ft 10 in (2.08 m)	Miami Heat	(United States)
G	8	Tim Hardaway	34 – September 1, 1966	6 ft 0 in (1.83 m)	Miami Heat	(United States)
G	9	Vince Carter	23 – January 26, 1977	6 ft 6 in (1.98 m)	Toronto Raptors	(Canada)
F	10	Kevin Garnett	24 – May 19, 1976	6 ft 11 in (2.11 m)	Minnesota Timberwolves	(United States)
C	11	Vin Baker	28 – November 23, 1971	6 ft 11 in (2.11 m)	Seattle SuperSonics	(United States)
G	12	Ray Allen	25 – July 20, 1975	6 ft 5 in (1.96 m)	Milwaukee Bucks	(United States)
C	13	Antonio McDyess	26 – September 7, 1974	6 ft 9 in (2.06 m)	Denver Nuggets	(United States)
G	14	Gary Payton (C)	32 – July 23, 1968	6 ft 4 in (1.93 m)	Seattle SuperSonics	(United States)
F	15	Shareef Abdur-Rahim	23 – December 11, 1976	6 ft 9 in (2.06 m)	Vancouver Grizzlies	(Canada)

Head coach

- (United States) Rudy Tomjanovich

Assistant coach(es)

- (United States) Larry Brown
- (United States) Gene Keady
- (United States) Tubby Smith

Legend

- (C) Team captain
- Club – describes last
  club before the tournament
- Age – describes age
  on September 15, 2000

Roster

=== Withdrawals ===
- Kobe Bryant - the 2000 All-NBA Second Team
- Tim Duncan - the 2000 All-NBA First Team, injured
- Tom Gugliotta, injured
- Grant Hill - the 2000 All-NBA Second Team, injured
- Allen Iverson - the 2000 All-NBA Second Team
- Karl Malone - the 2000 All-NBA Second Team
- Reggie Miller
- Shaquille O'Neal - the 2000 All-NBA First Team
- David Robinson - the 2000 All-NBA Third Team
- John Stockton - The 50 Greatest Players in National Basketball Association History
- Scottie Pippen - the 2000 NBA All-Defensive Second Team
- Paul Pierce
- Eddie Jones - the 2000 All-NBA Third Team
- Steve Francis - the 2000 Co-NBA Rookie of the Year
- Chris Webber - the 2000 All-NBA Third Team
- Stephon Marbury - the 2000 All-NBA Third Team

== Results ==
- United States beat China, 119–72
- United States beat Italy, 93–61
- United States beat Lithuania, 85–76
- United States beat New Zealand, 102–56
- United States beat France, 106–94
- United States beat Russia, 85–70
- United States beat Lithuania, 85–83
- United States beat France, 85–75

In the preliminary round, Team USA was undefeated (5-0), and qualified for the quarterfinals. In the knockout rounds, Team USA faced Russia (quarterfinals), Lithuania (semifinals), and France (gold-medal game).
