= Koprivnica (disambiguation) =

Koprivnica is a city in northern Croatia.

Koprivnica may also refer to:

- Koprivnica (Kakanj), a village in Kakanj, Bosnia and Herzegovina
- Koprivnica (Aleksinac), a village in Aleksinac, Serbia
- Koprivnica (Gadžin Han), a village in Gadžin Han, Serbia
- Koprivnica (Zaječar), a village in Zaječar, Serbia
- Koprivnica, Bardejov District, a settlement in Bardejov, Slovakia
- Koprivnica, Slovenia, a settlement in Krško, Slovenia

== See also ==
- Koprzywna, Koprzywnica - Polish form
- Kopřivnice - Czech form
- Koprivshtitsa - Bulgarian form
- Koprivnik (disambiguation)
- Kopriva (disambiguation)
- Koprivica
