= Veliki Kamen =

- Location in Slovenia
- Coordinates: 46°2′18.22″N 15°31′12.05″E
- Country: Slovenia
- Traditional region: Styria
- Statistical region: Lower Sava
- Municipality: Krško

Area
  - Total: 3.03 km^{2} (1.17 sq mi)
- Elevation: 295.1 m (968 ft)

Population (2002)
  - Total: 242
- Postal code: 8282

Veliki Kamen (pronounced [ˈʋeːliki ˈkaːmən], German: Großsteinbach) is a settlement northeast of Senovo in the Municipality of Krško in eastern Slovenia. The area is part of the traditional region of Styria. It is now included with the rest of the municipality in the Lower Sava Statistical Region.

== Mass grave ==
Veliki Kamen is the site of a mass grave from the end of the Second World War. The Šerbec Woods Mass Grave (Slovene: Grobišče v Šerbečevem gozdu), also known as the Marsh Mass Grave (Grobišče Čret), is located south of the settlement on the edge of a wooded area. About 20 Ustaša soldiers that were killed near the village were buried at the site by the local people in May 1945.

== Church ==
The local church is dedicated to Saint Martin and belongs to the Parish of Koprivnica.
