= Reštanj =

- Location in Slovenia
- Coordinates: 46°2′35.36″N 15°28′58.29″E
- Country: Slovenia
- Traditional region: Styria
- Statistical region: Lower Sava
- Municipality: Krško

Area
  - Total: 9.34 km^{2} (3.61 sq mi)
- Elevation: 420.3 m (1,379 ft)

Population (2002)
  - Total: 241
- Postal code: 8281

Reštanj (pronounced [ɾɛˈʃtaːn], in older sources also Raštanj, German: Reichenstein) is a dispersed settlement in the hills north of Senovo in the Municipality of Krško in eastern Slovenia. The area is part of the traditional region of Styria. It is now included in the Lower Sava Statistical Region.

The local church is built on a hill in the eastern part of the settlement and is dedicated to Saint Jodocus (Slovene: sveti Jošt). It belongs to the Parish of Koprivnica. It is a Gothic building that was restyled in the Baroque in the 18th century.

On a hill north of the settlement are the ruins of Reštanj Castle. It was mentioned in written documents dating to 1235. It was destroyed during the Croatian–Slovene Peasant Revolt in 1573 and never rebuilt.
