= Basketball at the 2009 Summer Universiade – Men's tournament =

The men's tournament of basketball at the 2009 Summer Universiade at Belgrade, Serbia began on July 2 and ended on July 11.

== Teams ==
Africa	Americas	Asia	Europe	Oceania	Automatic qualifiers
~~Gabon~~; South Africa	Brazil; Canada; Mexico; United States	China; Iran; Japan; South Korea; United Arab Emirates	Greece; Lithuania; Romania; Italy; Ukraine; Bulgaria; Turkey; Portugal; Russia; Israel; Germany; Latvia; Finland	Australia	Serbia– Universiade hosts

== Format ==
- 26 participating team are drawn into six groups of three teams (A, C, D, E, G, H) and two groups of four teams (B, F). Each group will use the single round robin system.
- 1st and 2nd placed teams of each group from the preliminary will be divided into four groups (I, J, K, L) of four teams. Each group will use the single round robin system. The results of the games between the two teams involved in the preliminary will be carried over.
- The 3rd and 4th placed teams of each group from the preliminary will be divided into two groups (M, N) of three teams each and one group (O) of four teams. The results of the games between the two teams involved in the preliminary will be carried over.
- Competitions for 17th–26th place will be conducted as follows:
  - 1st placed team of groups M, N and O will play each other for 17th–19th places.
  - 2nd placed team of groups M, N and O will play each other for 20th–22nd places.
  - 3rd and 4th placed teams of groups M, N and O will play each other for 23rd–26th places. The results of the games between the two teams involved in the second phase will be carried over.
- 1st and 2nd placed teams of each of the four groups I, J, K, L from the second phase will be divided into four games (Q, R, S, T) of two teams for Quarterfinals.
  - The 3rd placed teams of the four groups (I, J, K, L) will enter into a four-team classification playoff for 9th–12th places.
  - The 4th placed teams of the four groups (I, J, K, L) will enter into a four-team classification playoff for 13th–16th places.
- In the quarterfinals, the matchups are as follows: Q (1I vs. 2L), R (1J vs. 2K), S (1K vs. 2J) and T (1L vs. 2I).
- The winning teams of the four games (Q, R, S, T) from the quarterfinals will enter into a four-team classification playoff for 1st–4th places.
  - The losing teams of the four games from the quarterfinals will enter into a four-team classification playoff for 5th–8th places.
- The winning teams from the semifinals contest the gold medal. The losing teams contest the bronze.

Tie-breaking criteria:

1. Head to head results
2. Goal average (not the goal difference) between the tied teams
3. Goal average of the tied teams for all teams in its group

Note: all times are CEST

== Preliminary round ==
=== Group A ===
Team	W	L	PF	PA	PD	Pts
Serbia	2	0	165	116	49	4
Greece	1	1	139	153	-14	3
Australia	0	2	138	173	-35	2

July 2
20:00

Report

Serbia	81–50	Greece
Scoring by quarter: 22-15, 20-8, 24-12, 15-15

Belgrade Arena, Belgrade
Attendance: 3,000
Referees: Sergey Mikhailov (RUS), Eddie Viator (FRA)

July 3
17:30

Report

Greece	89–72	Australia
Scoring by quarter: 19-19, 17-12, 27-24, 26-17

Železnik Hall, Belgrade
Referees: Shmuel Bachar (ISR), Richard Stocker (CAN)

July 4
20:00

Report

Australia	66–84	Serbia
Scoring by quarter: 14-15, 16-18, 21-29, 15-22

Belgrade Arena, Belgrade
Attendance: 4,000
Referees: Richard Stocker (CAN), Arnis Ozols (LAT)

=== Group B ===
Team	W	L	PF	PA	PD	Pts
Lithuania	3	0	309	188	121	6
Romania	2	1	259	211	48	5
Mexico	1	2	278	225	53	4
UAE	0	3	155	377	-222	3

July 2
12:30

Report

Lithuania	93–75	Mexico
Scoring by quarter: 24-18, 25-13, 28-23, 16-21

Millennium Center, Vršac
Attendance: 200
Referees: Richard Stocker (CAN), Hero Avanesian (IRI)

July 2
15:00

Report

Romania	116–53	United Arab Emirates
Scoring by quarter: 22-9, 24-18, 37-6, 33-20

Millennium Center, Vršac
Attendance: 100
Referees: Marcin Kowalski (POL), Cesar A. Castro (MOZ)

July 3
12:30

Report

Mexico	73–78	Romania
Scoring by quarter: 21-20, 13-16, 21-19, 18-23

Železnik Hall, Belgrade
Attendance: 200
Referees: Winston Stith (USA), Milija Vojinovic (SRB)

July 3
15:00

Report

United Arab Emirates	48–131	Lithuania
Scoring by quarter: 13-30, 12-35, 11-36, 12-30

Železnik Hall, Belgrade
Attendance: 300
Referees: Chris Dodds (GBR), Hero Avanesian (IRI)

July 4
15:00

Report

Lithuania	85–65	Romania
Scoring by quarter: 19-12, 23-12, 20-24, 23-17

Sumice Sports Center, Belgrade
Attendance: 200
Referees: Marko Juras (SRB), Segio Pachero(BRA)

July 4
17:30

Report

United Arab Emirates	54–130	Mexico
Scoring by quarter: 16-31, 13-21, 15-46, 10-32

Sumice Sports Center, Belgrade
Attendance: 100
Referees: Yuki Kubo (JPN), Ersan Kartal (TUR)

=== Group C ===
Team	W	L	PF	PA	PD	Pts
Canada	2	0	189	163	26	4
Italy	1	1	170	168	2	3
China	0	2	162	190	-28	2

July 2
17:30

Report

Canada	89–80	Italy
Scoring by quarter: 28-22, 22-18, 25-20, 14-20

Belgrade Arena, Belgrade
Attendance: 200
Referees: Winston Stith (USA), Miroslav Tomov (BUL)

July 3
17:30

Report

Italy	90–79	China
Scoring by quarter: 22-23, 26-21, 25-14, 17-21

Sumice Sports Center, Belgrade
Attendance: 100
Referees: Robert Paulik (CZE), Shin Gi (KOR)

July 4
17:30

Report

China	83–100	Canada
Scoring by quarter: 15-29, 24-25, 22-16, 22-30

Belgrade Arena, Belgrade
Attendance: 500
Referees: Marius Ziulin (ROU), Marcin Kowalski (POL)

=== Group D ===
Team	W	L	PF	PA	PD	Pts
Bulgaria	2	0	187	167	20	4
Ukraine	1	1	175	153	22	3
Japan	0	2	170	212	-42	2

July 2
15:00

Report

Japan	74–104	Ukraine
Scoring by quarter: 17-33, 18-22, 27-26, 12-23

Sumice Sports Center, Belgrade
Attendance: 200
Referees: Robert Paulik (CZE), Ma Li Jun (CHN)

July 3
17:30

Report

Ukraine	71–79	Bulgaria
Scoring by quarter: 20-23, 14-17, 23-18, 14-21

Millennium Center, Vršac
Referees: Sasa Maricic (SRB), Zoltan Palla (HUN)

July 4
17:30

Report

Bulgaria	108–96	Japan
Scoring by quarter: 23-13, 27-22, 32-24, 26-37

Hala sportova, Belgrade
Attendance: 100
Referees: Sergey Mikhailov (RUS), Shin Gi (KOR)

=== Group E ===
Team	W	L	PF	PA	PD	Pts
Turkey	2	0	175	138	37	4
Portugal	1	1	148	162	-14	3
Iran	0	2	154	177	-23	2

July 2
17:30

Report

Turkey	84–62	Portugal
Scoring by quarter: 21-19, 20-12, 22-19, 21-12

Sumice Sports Center, Belgrade
Attendance: 250
Referees: Sergei Bulanov (RUS), Sasa Maricic (SRB)

July 3
17:30

Report

Portugal	86–78	Iran
Scoring by quarter: 20-22, 32-16, 11-15, 23-25

Hala sportova, Belgrade
Attendance: 200
Referees: Yuki Kubo (JPN), Tomas Lukas (SVK)

July 4
20:00

Report

Iran	76–91	Turkey
Scoring by quarter: 16-24, 12-23, 20-25, 28-19

Hala sportova, Belgrade
Attendance: 100
Referees: Milivoje Jovčić (SRB), Ahmad Al Bloushi (UAE)

=== Group F ===
Team	W	L	PF	PA	PD	Pts
Israel	3	0	183	125	58	6
Russia	2	1	174	143	31	5
Brazil	1	2	152	181	-29	4
Gabon	0	3	0	60	-60	0

July 2
12:30

Russia	20–0	Gabon

July 2
15:00

Report

Israel	82–70 (OT)	Brazil
Scoring by quarter: 15-19, 19-18, 20-17, 14-14, Overtime: 14-2

Železnik Hall, Belgrade
Attendance: 200
Referees: Ersan Kartal (TUR), Marius Ziulin (ROU)

July 3
15:00

Gabon	0–20	Israel

July 3
20:00

Report

Brazil	62–99	Russia
Scoring by quarter: 15-20, 15-22, 17-22, 15-35

Belgrade Arena, Belgrade
Attendance: 200
Referees: Brett Hogan (AUS), Boris Schmidt (GER)

July 4
17:30

Report

Russia	55–81	Israel
Scoring by quarter: 13-24, 13-19, 15-20, 14-18

Železnik Hall, Belgrade
Attendance: 100
Referees: Eddie Viator (FRA), Chris Dodds (GBR)

July 4
20:00

Brazil	20–0	Gabon

=== Group G ===
Team	W	L	PF	PA	PD	Pts
Latvia	2	0	180	118	62	4
Germany	1	1	162	122	40	3
South Africa	0	2	84	186	-102	2

July 2
17:30

Report

Germany	76–80	Latvia
Scoring by quarter: 19-10, 19-25, 15-21, 23-24

Hala sportova, Belgrade
Attendance: 200
Referees: Marko Juras (SRB), Luis Lopes (POR)

July 3
20:00

Report

Latvia	100–42	South Africa
Scoring by quarter: 26-7, 15-14, 30-10, 29-11

Hala sportova, Belgrade
Attendance: 100
Referees: Ersan Kartal (TUR), Sergey Mikhailov (RUS)

July 4
15:00

Report

South Africa	42–86	Germany
Scoring by quarter: 8-20, 11-17, 10-25, 13-24

Železnik Hall, Belgrade
Attendance: 100
Referees: Sasa Maricic (SRB), Luis Lopes (POR)

=== Group H ===
Team	W	L	PF	PA	PD	Pts
United States	2	0	200	116	84	4
Finland	1	1	130	162	-32	3
South Korea	0	2	151	202	-52	2

July 2
20:00

Report

South Korea	75–90	Finland
Scoring by quarter: 13-25, 20-22, 20-23, 22-20

Sumice Sports Center, Belgrade
Attendance: 250
Referees: Petros Papapetrou (GRE), Sergiy Zashchuk (UKR)

July 3
20:00

Report

Finland	40–87	United States
Scoring by quarter: 12-21, 7-18, 19-25, 2-23

Železnik Hall, Belgrade
Attendance: 300
Referees: Arnis Ozols (LAT), Marko Juras (SRB)

July 4
20:00

Report

United States	113–76	South Korea
Scoring by quarter: 26-11, 30-15, 24-26, 33-24

Sumice Sports Center, Belgrade
Attendance: 200
Referees: Zoltan Palla (HUN), Petros Papapetrou (GRE)

== Intermediate Round ==
=== Group I ===
Team	W	L	PF	PA	PD	Pts
United States	3	0	263	183	80	6
Serbia	2	1	229	188	41	5
Finland	1	2	180	235	-55	4
Greece	0	3	193	259	-66	3

July 6
20:00

Report

Greece	77–108	United States
Scoring by quarter: 19-23, 20-21, 15-31, 23-33

Hala sportova, Belgrade
Attendance: 350
Referees: Eddie Viator (FRA), Ma Li Jun (CHN)

July 6
20:00

Report

Serbia	82–70	Finland
Scoring by quarter: 20-9, 21-23, 27-13, 14-25

Belgrade Arena, Belgrade
Attendance: 4,000
Referees: Sergei Bulanov (RUS), Marcin Kowalski (POL)

July 7
20:00

Report

Finland	70–66	Greece
Scoring by quarter: 15-19, 17-22, 14-8, 24-17

Hala sportova, Belgrade
Attendance: 100
Referees: Richard Stocker (CAN), Luis Lopes (POR)

July 7
20:00

Report

United States	68–66	Serbia
Scoring by quarter: 15-18, 22-18, 20-20, 11-10

Belgrade Arena, Belgrade
Attendance: 14,000
Referees: Shmuel Bachar (ISR), Segio Pachero(BRA)

=== Group J ===
Team	W	L	PF	PA	PD	Pts
Lithuania	3	0	245	204	41	6
Germany	1	2	232	225	7	4
Latvia	1	2	222	245	-23	4
Romania	1	2	219	244	-25	4

July 6
17:30

Report

Lithuania	76–75	Germany
Scoring by quarter: 18-22, 21-19, 10-25, 27-9

Železnik Hall, Belgrade
Attendance: 200
Referees: Ersan Kartal (TUR), Luis Lopes (POR)

July 6
17:30

Report

Romania	85–78	Latvia
Scoring by quarter: 17-30, 24-21, 21-15, 23-12

Hala sportova, Belgrade
Attendance: 100
Referees: Richard Stocker (CAN), Sergiy Zashchuk(UKR)

July 7
17:30

Report

Latvia	64–84	Lithuania
Scoring by quarter: 23-16, 14-20, 16-27, 11-21

Belgrade Arena, Belgrade
Attendance: 700
Referees: Sergei Bulanov (RUS), Zoltan Palla (HUN)

July 7
20:00

Report

Germany	81–69	Romania
Scoring by quarter: 23-11, 29-17, 15-26, 14-15

Sumice Sports Center, Belgrade
Attendance: 100
Referees: Eddie Viator (FRA), Yuki Kubo (JPN)

=== Group K ===
Team	W	L	PF	PA	PD	Pts
Israel	3	0	279	212	67	6
Russia	2	1	236	234	2	5
Canada	1	2	247	258	-11	4
Italy	0	3	232	290	-58	3

July 6
15:00

Report

Italy	76–109	Israel
Scoring by quarter: 15-30, 15-31, 22-25, 24-23

Železnik Hall, Belgrade
Attendance: 200
Referees: Sasa Maricic (SRB), Brett Hogan (AUS)

July 6
17:30

Report

Canada	77–89	Russia
Scoring by quarter: 16-26, 12-24, 20-20, 29-19

Belgrade Arena, Belgrade
Attendance: 1,000
Referees: Segio Pachero(BRA), Milivoje Jovčić (SRB)

July 7
17:30

Report

Russia	92–76	Italy
Scoring by quarter: 25-14, 21-25, 29-19, 17-18

Železnik Hall, Belgrade
Attendance: 150
Referees: Miroslav Tomov (BUL), Marius Ciulin (ROU)

July 7
20:00

Report

Israel	89–81	Canada
Scoring by quarter: 25-18, 20-30, 23-19, 21-14

Železnik Hall, Belgrade
Attendance: 150
Referees: Boris Schmidt (GER), Shin Gi (KOR)

=== Group L ===
Team	W	L	PF	PA	PD	Pts
Turkey	3	0	216	183	33	6
Bulgaria	2	1	225	214	11	5
Ukraine	1	2	222	211	11	4
Portugal	0	3	205	260	-55	3

July 6
15:00

Report

Bulgaria	86–74	Portugal
Scoring by quarter: 18-22, 24-16, 28-20, 16-16

Millennium Center, Vršac
Attendance: 100
Referees: Arnis Ozols (LAT), Chris Dodds (GBR)

July 6
17:30

Report

Ukraine	61–63	Turkey
Scoring by quarter: 12-17, 17-13, 13-21, 19-12

Millennium Center, Vršac
Attendance: 150
Referees: Shmuel Bachar (ISR), Tomas Lukac (SVK)

July 7
17:30

Report

Portugal	69–90	Ukraine
Scoring by quarter: 13-25, 11-26, 27-9, 18-30

Millennium Center, Vršac
Referees: Chris Dodds (GRB), Milija Vojinovic (SRB)

July 7
20:00

Report

Turkey	69–60	Bulgaria
Scoring by quarter: 16-14, 13-16, 23-13, 17-17

Millennium Center, Vršac
Attendance: 100
Referees: Marko Juras (SRB), Ma Li Jun (CHN)

== Intermediate Round 17-25 Places ==
=== Group M ===
Team	W	L	PF	PA	PD	Pts
Australia	2	0	173	159	14	4
Iran	1	1	171	168	3	3
China	0	2	159	176	-17	2

July 6
12:30

Report

Australia	85–79	China
Scoring by quarter: 20-27, 26-25, 20-13, 19-14

Železnik Hall, Belgrade
Attendance: 100
Referees: Winston Stith (USA), Shin Gi (KOR)

July 7
15:00

Report

China	80–91 (OT)	Iran
Scoring by quarter: 6-22, 15-16, 18-10, 23-14, Overtime: 18-29

Sumice Sports Center, Belgrade
Attendance: 100
Referees: Brett Hogan (AUS), Ahmad Al Bloushi (UAE)

July 8
20:00

Report

Iran	80–88	Australia
Scoring by quarter: 22-22, 15-25, 28-15, 15-26

Sumice Sports Center, Belgrade
Attendance: 150
Referees: Miroslav Tomov (BUL), Cesar A. Castro (MOZ)

=== Group N ===
Team	W	L	PF	PA	PD	Pts
Brazil	2	0	191	129	62	4
Mexico	1	1	210	138	72	3
UAE	0	2	103	237	-134	2

July 6
17:30

Report

United Arab Emirates	49–107	Brazil
Scoring by quarter: 12-32, 16-25, 7-33, 14-17

Sumice Sports Center, Belgrade
Attendance: 100
Referees: Boris Schmidt (GER), Petros Papapetrou (GRE)

July 7
17:30

Report

Brazil	84–80	Mexico
Scoring by quarter: 21-22, 21-21, 26-22, 16-15

Hala sportova, Belgrade
Attendance: 50
Referees: Winston Stith (USA), Tomas Lukac (SVK)

=== Group O ===
Team	W	L	PF	PA	PD	Pts
Japan	2	0	204	138	66	4
South Korea	1	1	182	169	13	3
South Africa	0	2	133	212	-79	2

July 6
15:00

Report

South Africa	61–107	Japan
Scoring by quarter: 22-30, 9-28, 15-32, 15-17

Sumice Sports Center, Belgrade
Attendance: 60
Referees: Zoltan Palla (HUN), Ahmad Al Bloushi (UAE)

July 7
17:30

Report

Japan	97–77	South Korea
Scoring by quarter: 23-22, 25-19, 28-13, 21-23

Sumice Sports Center, Belgrade
Attendance: 100
Referees: Milivoje Jovčić (SRB), Sergey Mikhailov (RUS)

July 8
15:00

Report

South Korea	105–72	South Africa
Scoring by quarter: 26-21, 40-16, 18-16, 21-19

Hala sportova, Belgrade
Attendance: 60
Referees: Petros Papapetrou (GRE), Hero Avanesian (IRI)

== Classification round ==
=== Classification 23-25 places ===
Team	W	L	PF	PA	PD	Pts
China	2	0	205	137	68	4
UAE	1	1	150	181	-31	3
South Africa	0	2	152	189	-37	2

July 9
20:00

Report

South Africa	82–83 (OT)	United Arab Emirates
Scoring by quarter: 15-21, 15-11, 26-9, 12-27, Overtime: 14-15

SH Zrenjanin, Belgrade
Attendance: 2,000
Referees: Brett Hogan (AUS), Hero Avanesian (IRI)

July 10
15:00

Report

United Arab Emirates	67–99	China
Scoring by quarter: 15-26, 14-23, 12-27, 26-23

Hala sportova, Belgrade
Attendance: 50
Referees: Zoltan Palla (HUN), Tomas Lukac (SVK)

July 11
10:00

Report

China	106–70	South Africa
Scoring by quarter: 34-19, 18-9, 35-17, 19-25

Hala sportova, Belgrade
Attendance: 50
Referees: Ersan Kartal (TUR), Yuki Kubo (JPN)

=== Classification 20-22 places ===
Team	W	L	PF	PA	PD	Pts
Mexico	2	0	192	149	43	4
Iran	1	1	155	160	-5	3
South Korea	0	2	173	211	-38	2

July 9
20:00

Report

Iran	93–86	South Korea
Scoring by quarter: 17-27, 28-17, 22-23, 26-19

Sumice Sports Center, Belgrade
Attendance: 100
Referees: Chris Dodds (GBR), Ignatius Mkhasibe T.B. (RSA)

July 10
20:00

Report

South Korea	87–118	Mexico
Scoring by quarter: 13-32, 21-27, 29-36, 24-23

Sumice Sports Center, Belgrade
Attendance: 50
Referees: Ma Li Jun (CHN), Miroslav Tomov (BUL)

July 11
10:00

Report

Mexico	74–62	Iran
Scoring by quarter: 18-15, 18-13, 15-17, 23-17

Železnik Hall, Belgrade
Attendance: 50,
Referees: Arnis Ozols (LAT), Cesar A. Castro (MOZ)

=== Classification 17-19 places ===
Team	W	L	PF	PA	PD	Pts
Australia	2	0	185	175	10	4
Brazil	1	1	176	171	5	3
Japan	0	2	189	204	-15	2

July 9
17:30

Report

Australia	106–97	Japan
Scoring by quarter: 21-31, 29-17, 26-30, 30-19

Sumice Sports Center, Belgrade
Attendance: 50
Referees: Shin Gi (KOR), Ahmad Al Bloushi (UAE)

July 10
17:30

Report

Japan	92–98	Brazil
Scoring by quarter: 31-31, 16-32, 21-18, 24-17

Sumice Sports Center, Belgrade
Attendance: 100
Referees: Sergiy Zashchuk (UKR), Milija Vojinovic (SRB)

July 11
10:00

Report

Brazil	78–79	Australia
Scoring by quarter: 18-19, 23-9, 26-24, 11-27

Sumice Sports Center, Belgrade
Attendance: 20
Referees: Robert Paulik (CZE), Zoltan Palla (HUN)

=== Classification 13-16 places ===
July 9
17:30

Report

Greece	85–76	Portugal
Scoring by quarter: 27-15, 19-21, 14-20, 25-20

Železnik Hall, Belgrade
Attendance: 100
Referees: Milivoje Jovčić (SRB), Ersan Kartal (TUR)

July 9
20:00

Report

Romania	90–88	Italy
Scoring by quarter: 29-29, 29-17, 20-25, 12-27

Železnik Hall, Belgrade
Attendance: 50
Referees: Boris Schmidt (GER), Sergei Bulanov (RUS)

=== Classification 9-12 places ===
July 9
17:30

Report

Finland	67–62	Ukraine
Scoring by quarter: 19-16, 18-20, 22-13, 8-13

Millennium Center, Vršac
Attendance: 100
Referees: Sasa Maricic (SRB), Segio Pachero (BRA)

July 9
20:00

Report

Latvia	83–93	Canada
Scoring by quarter: 26-21, 18-23, 24-24, 15-25

Millennium Center, Vršac
Attendance: 100
Referees: Shmuel Bachar (ISR), Winston Stith (USA)

== Tournament bracket ==
Quarterfinals
J2	Germany	49
K1	Israel	66
I2	Serbia	68
L1	Turkey	46
K2	Russia	82
J1	Lithuania	73
I1	United States	96
L2	Bulgaria	66

Semifinals
K1	Israel	56
I2	Serbia	82
K2	Russia	69
I1	United States	68

Gold-medal game
I2	Serbia	73
K2	Russia	51
Bronze-medal game
K1	Israel	80
I1	United States	91

== Quarterfinals ==
July 9
12:30

Report

Germany	49–66	Israel
Scoring by quarter: 11-13, 17-16, 9-18, 12-19

Belgrade Arena, Belgrade
Attendance: 300
Referees: Arnis Ozols (LAT), Robert Paulik (CZE), Sergey Mikhailov (RUS)

July 9
15:00

Report

Serbia	68–46	Turkey
Scoring by quarter: 20-9, 20-10, 16-19, 12-8

Belgrade Arena, Belgrade
Attendance: 4,000
Referees: Miroslav Tomov (BUL), Sergiy Zashchuk (UKR), Tomas Lukac (SVK)

July 9
17:30

Report

Russia	82–73	Lithuania
Scoring by quarter: 18-22, 20-22, 22-13, 22-16

Belgrade Arena, Belgrade
Attendance: 400
Referees: Eddie Viator (FRA), Marcin Kowalski (POL), Zoltan Palla (HUN)

July 9
20:00

Report

United States	96–66	Bulgaria
Scoring by quarter: 24-9, 22-15, 22-24, 28-18

Belgrade Arena, Belgrade
Attendance: 500
Referees: Luis Lopes (POR), Petros Papapetrou (GRE), Yuki Kubo (JPN)

== Semifinals ==
July 10
17:30

Report

Russia	69–68	United States
Scoring by quarter: 11-14, 16-20, 22-25, 20-9

Belgrade Arena, Belgrade
Attendance: 8,000
Referees: Segio Pachero(BRA), Arnis Ozols (LAT), Ersan Kartal (TUR)

July 10
20:00

Report

Israel	56–82	Serbia
Scoring by quarter: 21-20, 15-27, 11-17, 9-18

Belgrade Arena, Belgrade
Attendance: 12,000
Referees: Boris Schmidt (GER), Luis Lopes (POR), Petros Papapetrou (GRE),

=== Classification 5-8 places ===
July 10
17:30

Report

Germany	63–67	Turkey
Scoring by quarter: 11-15, 21-14, 13-27, 18-11

Hala sportova, Belgrade
Attendance: 50
Referees: Sergei Bulanov (RUS), Milivoje Jovčić (SRB), Winston Stith (USA)

July 10
20:00

Report

Lithuania	89–88	Bulgaria
Scoring by quarter: 18-17, 23-22, 21-29, 27-20

Hala sportova, Belgrade
Attendance: 50
Referees: Eddie Viator (FRA), Marius Ciulin (ROU), Marko Juras (SRB)

== Finals ==
=== Final 15-16 places ===
July 11
12:30

Report

Portugal	67–82	Italy
Scoring by quarter: 12-20, 23-22, 18-18, 14-22

Sumice Sports Center, Belgrade
Attendance: 100
Referees: Boris Schmidt (GER), Miroslav Tomov (BUL)

=== Final 13-14 places ===
July 11
15:00

Report

Greece	82–88	Romania
Scoring by quarter: 17-21, 12-22, 22-15, 31-30

Sumice Sports Center, Belgrade
Attendance: 50
Referees: Milija Vojinovic (SRB), Luis Lopes (POR)

=== Final 11-12 places ===
July 11
12:30

Report

Ukraine	79–76	Latvia
Scoring by quarter: 21-30, 14-14, 19-15, 25-17

Železnik Hall, Belgrade
Attendance: 200
Referees: Petros Papapetrou (GRE), Shin Gi (KOR)

=== Final 9-10 places ===
July 11
15:00

Report

Finland	63–88	Canada
Scoring by quarter: 14-22, 18-17, 14-16, 17-33

Železnik Hall, Belgrade
Attendance: 200
Referees: Chris Dodds (GBR), Ma Li Jun (CHN)

=== Final 7-8 places ===
July 11
12:30

Report

Germany	72–77	Bulgaria
Scoring by quarter: 12-21, 15-24, 25-14, 20-18

Hala sportova, Belgrade
Attendance: 50
Referees: Segio Pachero(BRA), Sergiy Zashchuk(UKR), Ignatius Mkhasibe T.B. (RSA)

=== Final 5-6 places ===
July 11
15:00

Report

Turkey	87– 107	Lithuania
Scoring by quarter: 18-23, 22-28, 19-24, 28-32

Železnik Hall, Belgrade
Attendance: 50
Referees: Winston Stith (USA), Sergey Mikhailov (RUS), Hero Avanesian (IRI)

=== Bronze-medal game ===
July 11
18:00

Report

Israel	80–91	United States
Scoring by quarter: 22-24, 14-19, 28-27, 16-21

Belgrade Arena, Belgrade
Attendance: 2,000
Referees: Milivoje Jovčić (SRB), Richard Stocker (CAN), Marcin Kowalski (POL)

=== Final ===
July 11
21:00

Report

Serbia	73–51	Russia
Scoring by quarter: 22-11, 17-20, 16-10, 18-10

Belgrade Arena, Belgrade
Attendance: 20,000
Referees: Shmuel Bachar (ISR), Eddie Viator (FRA), Tomas Lukac (SVK)

== Final standings ==
Place	Team	Score
1st place, gold medalist(s)	Serbia	6–1
2nd place, silver medalist(s)	Russia	6–2
3rd place, bronze medalist(s)	United States	6–1
4	Israel	6–2
5	Lithuania	7–1
6	Turkey	5–2
7	Bulgaria	4–3
8	Germany	2–5
9	Canada	4-2
10	Finland	3-3
11	Ukraine	3–3
12	Latvia	2–4
13	Romania	5–2
14	Greece	2–4
15	Italy	2–4
16	Portugal	1–5
17	Australia	4–2
18	Brazil	4–3
19	Japan	2–4
20	Mexico	3–3
21	Iran	2–4
22	South Korea	1–5
23	China	2–4
24	UAE	1–5
25	South Africa	0–6
