= Koprivica =

Koprivica (Cyrillic: Копривица) is a Montenegrin, Serbian and Croatian surname. Koprivicas stem from the area of Banjani, which was formerly part of Herzegovina but together with Piva, Nikšić and Sutorina was attached to Montenegro on July 13, 1878 due to a decision of the Congress of Berlin.

Koprivicas can be found in the whole world, but mostly in Serbia, Montenegro and Bosnia and Herzegovina being mostly Orthodox Serbs, although some Koprivicas live in Croatia where they converted from Orthodoxy to Catholicism. Koprivicas in Croatia live mostly in Konavle and Dubrovnik. The family arrived in Dubrovnik 1393 where Vuk Koprivica married a noblewoman and converted to Catholicism. Through ages, Koprivicas gave many doctors, politicians and priests in Dubrovnik. Famous are Niko Koprivica, who served as last NDH Mayor of Dubrovnik in 1944 during Nazi occupation and was later executed by Yugoslav Partisans when they entered Dubrovnik. In 1991, two Koprivica brothers, Ivo and Nikša served as defenders of the city during Croatian War of Independence. Ivo died in the war, leaving his younger brother as head of this ancient Dubrovnik family.

Some notable people with the surname Koprivica are:

- Balša Koprivica (born 2000), Serbian basketball player, son of Slaviša Koprivica
- Jovan Koprivica (born 1982), Serbian basketball player, son of Žarko Koprivica
- Nikola Koprivica (born 1988), Serbian basketball player, son of Žarko Koprivica
- Slaviša Koprivica (born 1968), Serbian basketball player
- Žarko Koprivica (born 1956), Serbian basketball player
- Niko Koprivica (1889-1944), Croatian politician, member of Croatian Peasant Party, knight of the Papal Order of St Gregory, wartime Lord Mayor of Dubrovnik
