= Basketball at the 2009 Summer Universiade – Women's tournament =

The women's tournament of basketball at the 2009 Summer Universiade at Belgrade, Serbia began on July 1 and ended on July 11.

== Teams ==
Africa	Americas	Asia	Europe	Oceania	Automatic qualifiers
Mozambique	Canada; United States	China; Japan; Chinese Taipei	Turkey; Russia; Poland; France; Czech Republic; Slovakia; Hungary; Great Britain	Australia	Serbia– Universiade hosts

== Format ==
- 16 participating team are drawn into four groups of four teams (A, B, C, and D). Each group will use the single round robin system.
- Following preliminary round pool play, teams will be seeded for second-round games based on their pool standings. The top two finishing teams from each pool advance to play for 1st - 8th place. The third and fourth place teams will compete in the classification for 9th -16th place.
- 1st and 2nd placed teams of each group from the preliminary will be divided into four groups (E, F, G, and H) of four teams. Each group will use the single round robin system. The results of the games between the two teams involved in the preliminary will be carried over.

== Preliminary round ==
=== Group A ===
Team	W	L	PF	PA	PD	Pts
United States	3	0	292	139	153	6
Great Britain	2	1	215	216	-1	5
Serbia	1	2	213	214	-1	4
France	0	3	140	291	-151	3

July 1
10:00

Report

United States	115–30	France
Scoring by quarter: 35-7, 19-8, 28-4, 31-11

Hala sportova, Belgrade
Referees: Boris Schmidt (GER), Richard Stocker (CAN)

July 1
12:30

Report

Serbia	67–76	Great Britain
Scoring by quarter: 18-14, 24-16, 7-24, 18-22

Hala sportova, Belgrade
Referees: Robert Paulik (CZE), Tomas Lukas (SVK)

July 2
12:30

Report

Great Britain	59–93	United States
Scoring by quarter: 7-27, 15-22, 20-26, 17-18

Sumice Sports Center, Belgrade
Attendance: 200
Referees: Segio Pachero(BRA), Ahmad Al Bloushi (UAE)

July 2
20:00

Report

France	54–96	Serbia
Scoring by quarter: 12-19, 13-18, 16-29, 13-30

Hala sportova, Belgrade
Attendance: 300
Referees: Tomas Lukac (SVK), Brett Hogan (AUS)

July 3
17:30

Report

Serbia	50–84	United States
Scoring by quarter: 14-20, 12-23, 11-19, 13-22

Belgrade Arena, Belgrade
Attendance: 1,200
Referees: Sergei Bulanov (RUS), Ahmad Al Bloushi (UAE)

July 3
20:00

Report

France	56–80	Great Britain
Scoring by quarter: 12-18, 12-15, 19-32, 13-25

Sumice Sports Center, Belgrade
Attendance: 100
Referees: Marius Ziulin (ROU), Ignatius T. B. Mkhasibe (RSA)

=== Group B ===
Team	W	L	PF	PA	PD	Pts
Australia	3	0	265	182	83	6
Slovakia	2	1	238	240	-2	5
Japan	1	2	247	280	-33	4
Canada	0	3	207	255	-48	3

July 1
10:00

Report

Australia	112–69	Japan
Scoring by quarter: 33-20, 28-19, 27-17, 26-13

Železnik Hall, Belgrade
Attendance: 100
Referees: Sergei Bulanov (RUS), Hero Avanesian (IRI)

July 1
12:30

Report

Canada	79–85	Slovakia
Scoring by quarter: 17-24, 14-18, 27-21, 21-22

Železnik Hall, Belgrade
Attendance: 100
Referees: Arnis Ozols (LAT), Milija Vojinovic (SRB)

July 2
12:30

Report

Japan	90–78	Canada
Scoring by quarter: 19-14, 25-20, 25-21, 21-23

Hala sportova, Belgrade
Attendance: 200
Referees: Boris Schmidt (GER), Elif Inci (TUR)

July 2
15:00

Report

Slovakia	63–73	Australia
Scoring by quarter: 16-21, 15-19, 14-19, 18-14

Hala sportova, Belgrade
Attendance: 100
Referees: Chris Dodds (GBR), Shmuel Bachar (ISR)

July 3
12:30

Report

Australia	80–50	Canada
Scoring by quarter: 23-10, 15-11, 19-13, 23-16

Millennium Center, Vršac
Attendance: 100
Referees: Sergiy Zashchuk (UKR), Elif Inci (TUR)

July 3
20:00

Report

Slovakia	90–88	Japan
Scoring by quarter: 17-21, 25-15, 24-27, 24-25

Millennium Center, Vršac
Attendance: 100
Referees: Dawn Michelle Marsh (USA), Eddie Viator (FRA)

=== Group C ===
Team	W	L	PF	PA	PD	Pts
Russia	3	0	262	155	107	6
Chinese Taipei	2	1	189	201	-12	5
Hungary	1	2	208	205	3	4
Mozambique	0	3	164	262	-98	3

July 1
10:00

Report

Russia	105–52	Mozambique
Scoring by quarter: 36-13, 19-12, 20-17, 30-10

Sumice Sports Center, Belgrade
Attendance: 100
Referees: Marius Ziulin (ROU), Miroslav Tomov (BUL)

July 1
12:30

Report

Chinese Taipei	73–64	Hungary
Scoring by quarter: 16-14, 29-13, 10-19, 18-18

Sumice Sports Center, Belgrade
Attendance: 100
Referees: Sergiy Zashcuk (UKR), Luis Lopes (POR)

July 2
17:30

Report

Mozambique	62–73	Chinese Taipei
Scoring by quarter: 15-24, 17-20, 14-19, 16-10

Millennium Center, Vršac
Attendance: 50
Referees: Shone Suguro (JPN), Ignatius Mkhasibe T.B. (RSA)

July 2
20:00

Report

Hungary	60–82	Russia
Scoring by quarter: 10-21, 22-24, 11-24, 17-13

Millennium Center, Vršac
Attendance: 100
Referees: Dawn Michelle Marsh (USA), Karolina Anderson (FIN)

July 3
12:30

Report

Russia	75–43	Chinese Taipei
Scoring by quarter: 26-13, 19-8, 19-9, 11-13

Hala sportova, Belgrade
Attendance: 150
Referees: Karolina Anderson (FIN), Shone Suguro (JPN)

July 3
15:00

Report

Hungary	84–50	Mozambique
Scoring by quarter: 20-10, 27-14, 18-10, 19-16

Hala sportova, Belgrade
Attendance: 100
Referees: Marcin Kowalski (POL), Liu Wei (CHN)

=== Group D ===
Team	W	L	PF	PA	PD	Pts
Czech Republic	3	0	292	197	95	6
Poland	2	1	234	231	3	5
China	1	2	227	239	-12	4
Turkey	0	3	184	270	-86	3

July 1
10:00

Report

Poland	83–73	China
Scoring by quarter: 27-14, 23-19, 15-25, 18-15

Millennium Center, Vršac
Attendance: 400
Referees: Winston Stith (USA), Shmuel Bachar (ISR)

July 1
12:30

Report

Czech Republic	107–55	Turkey
Scoring by quarter: 24-15, 28-16, 29-11, 26-13

Millennium Center, Vršac
Attendance: 100
Referees: Brett Hogan (AUS), Karolina Anderson (FIN)

July 2
17:30

Report

China	71–101	Czech Republic
Scoring by quarter: 18-27, 15-24, 27-24, 11-26

Železnik Hall, Belgrade
Attendance: 50
Referees: Milija Vojinovic (SRB), Shin Gi (KOR)

July 2
20:00

Report

Turkey	74–80	Poland
Scoring by quarter: 9-26, 18-19, 25-16, 22-19

Železnik Hall, Belgrade
Attendance: 50
Referees: Arnis Ozols (LAT), Liu Wei (CHN)

July 3
12:30

Report

Poland	71–84	Czech Republic
Scoring by quarter: 16-25, 17-23, 19-17, 19-19

Sumice Sports Center, Belgrade
Referees: Miroslav Tomov (BUL), Petros Papapetrou (GRE)

July 3
15:00

Report

Turkey	55–83	China
Scoring by quarter: 14-19, 18-20, 16-16, 7-28

Sumice Sports Center, Belgrade
Attendance: 100
Referees: Segio Pachero (BRA), Cesar A. Castro (MOZ)

== Intermediate Round ==
=== Group E ===
Team	W	L	PF	PA	PD	Pts
United States	3	0	283	204	79	6
Czech Republic	2	1	251	269	-18	5
Poland	1	2	212	223	-11	4
Great Britain	0	3	206	256	-50	3

July 5
17:30

Report

United States	75–67	Poland
Scoring by quarter: 18-17, 19-15, 18-16, 20-19

SH Zrenjanin, Zrenjanin
Attendance: 3,500
Referees: Milija Vojinovic (SRB), Ma Li Jun (CHN)

July 5
20:00

Report

Great Britain	83–89 (OT)	Czech Republic
Scoring by quarter: 22-21, 23-21, 16-12, 16-23, Overtime: 6-12

SH Zrenjanin, Zrenjanin
Attendance: 2, 500
Referees: Shmuel Bachar (ISR), Yuki Kubo (JPN)

July 7
12:30

Report

Poland	74–64	Great Britain
Scoring by quarter: 10-12, 23-23, 22-11, 19-18

Železnik Hall, Belgrade
Attendance: 50
Referees: Arnis Ozols (LAT), Shone Suguro (JPN)

July 7
15:00

Report

Czech Republic	78–115	United States
Scoring by quarter: 20-28, 17-35, 23-29, 18-23

Železnik Hall, Belgrade
Attendance: 150
Referees: Sasa Maricic (SRB), Karolina Anderson (FIN)

=== Group F ===
Team	W	L	PF	PA	PD	Pts
Russia	3	0	240	151	89	6
Australia	2	1	224	216	8	5
Chinese Taipei	1	2	185	219	-34	4
Slovakia	0	3	164	227	-63	3

July 5
17:30

Report

Australia	79–67	Chinese Taipei
Scoring by quarter: 28-11, 13-12, 21-25, 17-19

Belgrade Arena, Belgrade
Attendance: 150
Referees: Dawn Michelle Marsh (USA), Shin Gi (KOR)

July 5
20:00

Report

Slovakia	36–79	Russia
Scoring by quarter: 11-19, 11-21, 10-24, 4-15

Belgrade Arena, Belgrade
Attendance: 350
Referees: Milivoje Jovčić (SRB), Zoltan Palla (HUN)

July 7
12:30

Report

Chinese Taipei	75–65	Slovakia
Scoring by quarter: 16-14, 26-14, 10-25, 23-12

Millennium Center, Belgrade
Attendance: 50
Referees: Ersan Kartal (TUR), Petros Papapetrou (GRE)

July 7
15:00

Report

Russia	86–72	Australia
Scoring by quarter: 29-22, 23-17, 19-17, 15-16

Millennium Center, Belgrade
Attendance: 100
Referees: Marcin Kowalski (POL), Elif Inci (TUR)

=== Group G ===
Team	W	L	PF	PA	PD	Pts
Serbia	2	1	251	201	50	5
China	2	1	236	212	24	5
France	1	2	215	261	-46	4
Turkey	1	2	214	242	-28	4

July 5
17:30

Report

Serbia	76–85	Turkey
Scoring by quarter: 22-26, 22-15, 12-23, 20-21

Železnik Hall, Belgrade
Attendance: 250
Referees: Sergei Bulanov (RUS), Shone Suguro (JPN)

July 5
20:00

Report

France	78–91	China
Scoring by quarter: 24-30, 17-23, 19-28, 18-10

Železnik Hall, Belgrade
Attendance: 200
Referees: Robert Paulik (CZE), Cesar A. Castro (MOZ)

July 6
12:30

Report

Turkey	74–83	France
Scoring by quarter: 20-22, 20-20, 14-21, 20-20

Millennium Center, Vršac
Attendance: 100
Referees: Cesar A. Castro (MOZ), Yuki Kubo (JPN)

July 6
20:00

Report

China	62–79	Serbia
Scoring by quarter: 12-20, 16-19, 13-21, 21-19

Sumice Sports Center, Belgrade
Attendance: 250
Referees: Karolina Anderson (FIN), Ignatius T.B. Mkhasibe (RSA)

=== Group E ===
Team	W	L	PF	PA	PD	Pts
Hungary	3	0	260	223	37	6
Japan	2	1	281	259	22	5
Canada	1	2	233	229	4	4
Mozambique	0	3	194	257	-63	3

July 5
17:30

Report

Japan	97–86	Mozambique
Scoring by quarter: 23-21, 22-27, 23-20, 29-18

Sumice Sports Center, Belgrade
Attendance: 100
Referees: Hero Avanesian (IRI), Elif Inci (TUR)

July 5
20:00

Report

Canada	79–81	Hungary
Scoring by quarter: 17-26, 16-19, 19-12, 27-24

Sumice Sports Center, Belgrade
Attendance: 200
Referees: Miroslav Tomov (BUL), Ignatius Mkhasibe T.B. (RSA)

July 6
12:30

Report

Hungary	95–94 (OT)	Japan
Scoring by quarter: 12-17, 22-26, 28-16, 21-25, Overtime: 11-10

Hala sportova, Belgrade
Attendance: 100
Referees: Robert Paulik (CZE), Elif Inci (TUR)

July 6
15:00

Report

Mozambique	58–76	Canada
Scoring by quarter: 21-14, 8-23, 20-25, 9-14

Hala sportova, Belgrade
Attendance: 100
Referees: Dawn Michelle Marsh (USA), Liu Wei (CHN)

== Classification round ==
=== Classification 13-16 places ===
July 8
15:00

Report

France	75–64	Mozambique
Scoring by quarter: 17-13, 19-11, 18-24, 21-16

Sumice Sports Cente, Belgrade
Attendance: 100
Referees: Chris Dodds (GBR), Ignatius Mkhasibe T.B. (RSA)

July 8
17:30

Report

Turkey	104–81	Canada
Scoring by quarter: 27-22, 30-19, 22-22, 25-18

Sumice Sports Cente, Belgrade
Attendance: 50
Referees: Tomas Lukac (SVK), Liu Wei (CHN)

=== Classification 9-12 places ===
July 8
17:30

Report

Serbia	96–124	Japan
Scoring by quarter: 30-32, 16-19, 21-35, 29-38

Železnik Hall, Belgrade
Attendance: 100
Referees: Robert Paulik (CZE), Marcin Kowalski (POL)

July 8
20:00

Report

China	76–64	Hungary
Scoring by quarter: 30-22, 10-7, 17-28, 19-7

Železnik Hall, Belgrade
Attendance: 100
Referees: Marko Juras (SRB), Shone Suguro (JPN)

=== Classification 5-8 places ===
July 8
17:30

Report

Poland	75–65	Slovakia
Scoring by quarter: 17-13, 18-17, 25-17, 15-18

Hala sportova, Belgrade
Attendance: 100
Referees: Sergiy Zashchuk(UKR), Elif Inci (TUR), Zoltan Palla (HUN)

July 8
20:00

Report

Great Britain	94–74	Chinese Taipei
Scoring by quarter: 26-14, 23-22, 24-13, 21-25

Hala sportova, Belgrade
Attendance: 50
Referees: Dawn Michelle Marsh (USA), Karolina Anderson (FIN), Brett Hogan (AUS)

== Semifinals ==
July 9
17:30

Report

United States	81–66	Australia
Scoring by quarter: 27-13, 16-12, 16-15, 22-26

Hala sportova, Belgrade
Attendance: 350
Referees: Richard Stocker (CAN), Shone Suguro (JPN), Milija Vojinovic (SRB)

July 9
20:00

Report

Czech Republic	64–107	Russia
Scoring by quarter: 24-25, 13-27, 9-27, 18-28

Hala sportova, Belgrade
Attendance: 350
Referees: Marko Juras (SRB), Marius Ciulin (ROU), Ma Li Jun (CHN)

== Finals ==
=== Final 15-16 places ===
July 10
17:30

Report

Mozambique	65–83	Canada
Scoring by quarter: 17-21, 19-22, 20-18, 9-22

Železnik Hall, Belgrade
Attendance: 50
Referees: Marcin Kowalski (POL), Ahmad Al Bloushi (UAE)

=== Final 13-14 places ===
July 10
20:00

Report

France	58–69	Turkey
Scoring by quarter: 20-9, 14-24, 16-18, 8-18

Železnik Hall, Belgrade
Attendance: 50
Referees: Shone Suguro (JPN), Hero Avanesian (IRI)

=== Final 11-12 places ===
July 10
15:00

Report

Serbia	81–67	Hungary
Scoring by quarter: 26-18, 14-20, 20-17, 21-12

Železnik Hall, Belgrade
Attendance: 50
Referees: Robert Paulik (CZE), Liu Wei (CHN)

=== Final 9-10 places ===
July 10
15:00

Report

Japan	91–86	China
Scoring by quarter: 29-24, 11-23, 28-18, 23-21

Sumice Sports Center, Belgrade
Attendance: 70
Referees: Shin Gi (KOR), Elif Inci (TUR)

=== Final 7-8 places ===
July 10
17:30

Report

Slovakia	76–79 (OT)	Chinese Taipei
Scoring by quarter: 16-15, 17-21, 20-8, 9-18, Overtime: 14-17

Millennium Center, Vršac
Attendance: 100
Referees: Dawn Michelle Marsh (USA), Chris Dodds (GBR), Yuki Kubo (JPN)

=== Final 5-6 places ===
July 10
20:00

Report

Poland	79–74 (OT)	Great Britain
Scoring by quarter: 17-15, 15-22, 21-12, 13-17, Overtime: 13-8

Millennium Center, Vršac
Attendance: 100
Referees: Karolina Anderson (FIN), Sergei Mikhailov (RUS), Cesar A. Castro (MOZ)

=== Bronze-medal game ===
July 11
2:30

Report

Australia	88–77	Czech Republic
Scoring by quarter: 26-21, 13-15, 22-13, 27-28

Belgrade Arena, Belgrade
Attendance: 300,
Referees: Dawn Michelle Marsh (USA), Marko Juras (SRB), Marius Ciulin (ROU)

=== Final ===
July 11
15:00

Report

United States	83–64	Russia
Scoring by quarter: 20-22, 19-9, 25-16, 19-17

Belgrade Arena, Belgrade
Referees: Sasa Maricic (SRB), Karolina Anderson (FIN), Brett Hogan (AUS)

== Final standings ==
Place	Team	Score
1st place, gold medalist(s)	United States	8–0
2nd place, silver medalist(s)	Russia	7–1
3rd place, bronze medalist(s)	Australia	6–2
4	Czech Republic	5–3
5	Poland	5–3
6	Great Britain	3–5
7	Chinese Taipei	4–4
8	Slovakia	2–6
9	Japan	5–3
10	China	4–4
11	Serbia	4–4
12	Hungary	4–4
13	Turkey	3–5
14	France	2–6
15	Canada	2–6
16	Mozambique	0–8
