= Olga Yakovleva =

Olga Yakovleva is the name of:

- Olga Yakovleva (actress), Russian actress, frequent collaborator of the director Anatoly Efros
- Olga Yakovleva (basketball, born 1963), Russian basketball player
- Olga Yakovleva (basketball, born 1986) (died 2010), Russian basketball player
- Olga Vitalevna Yakovleva or Origa (1970–2015), Russian singer
