= Basketball at the 2009 Summer Universiade =

The basketball competition in the 2009 Summer Universiade was held at different venues in Serbia on 1–11 July 2009.

== Basketball – Men ==
Event	Gold	Silver	Bronze
Men's basketball	Serbia (SRB); Nikola Koprivica; Milan Mačvan; Nemanja Protić; Nemanja Bjelica; Marko Kešelj; Strahinja Milošević; Vukašin Aleksić; Miroslav Raduljica; Marko Simonović; Ivan Paunić; Dejan Borovnjak; Vladimir Štimac	Russia (RUS); Aleksei Kotishevskiy; Dmitriy Golovin; Valery Likhodey; Nikita Shabalkin; Euvgeniy Voronov; Artem Gorlanov; Ivan Nelyubov; Anatoly Kashirov; Alexey Zhukanenko; Dramir Zibirov; Roman Shapovalov; Euvgeniy Kolesnikov	United States (USA); Talor Battle; Corey Fisher; Da'Sean Butler; Robbie Hummel; Evan Turner; James Anderson; Quincy Pondexter; Lazar Hayward; Craig Brackins; Trevor Booker; Jarvis Varnado; Deon Thompson

== Basketball – Women ==
Event	Gold	Silver	Bronze
Women's basketball	United States (USA); Ashley Houts; Alexis Gray-Lawson; Danielle McCray; Danielle Robinson; Tiffany Hayes; Maya Moore; Jeanette Pohlen; Kayla Pedersen; Tina Charles; Jacinta Monroe; Jantel Lavender; Ta'Shia Phillips	Russia (RUS); Evgenia Belyakova; Yekaterina Lisina; Tatiana Burik; Maria Cherepanova; Margarita Podlesnykh; Svetlana Makhlina; Maria Khrustaleva; Tatiana Bokareva; Maria Savina; Elena Danilochkina; Anastasia Gradova; Olga Yakovleva	Australia (AUS); Lauren Mansfield; Chantella Perera; Amy Lewis; Sarah Graham; Mia Newley; Emma Langford; Kiera Shiels; Sally Potocki; Alyce Shearing; Elyse Penaluna; Marianna Tolo; Louella Tomlinson
