= Kopriva =

Kopriva may refer to:

== Places ==
- Kopriva, Razkrižje, a small settlement in the Municipality of Razkrižje in eastern Slovenia
- Kopriva, Sežana, a village in the Municipality of Sežana in the Littoral region of Slovenia
- Kopriva Peak, rocky peak in Graham Land, Antarctica

== People with the surname ==
- Kopřiva, Czech surname
- Juan Carlos Kopriva, Argentine footballer

== See also ==
- Koprivnica
