= Kopřiva =

Kopřiva (pronounced [ˈkopr̝̊ɪva]; feminine: Kopřivová) is a Czech surname meaning 'nettle'. Notable people with the surname include:

- David Kopřiva (born 1979), Czech rower
- František Kopřiva (1892–unknown), Czech wrestler
- Jaroslav Kopřiva (born 1990), Czech bobsledder
- Karel Blažej Kopřiva (1756–1785), Bohemian organist and composer
- Ladislav Kopřiva (1897–1971), Czech-Czechoslovak communist
- Miroslav Kopřiva (born 1983), Czech ice hockey goaltender
- Ondřej Kopřiva (born 1988), Czech badminton player
- Štěpán Kopřiva (born 1971), Czech writer
- Václav Jan Kopřiva (1708–1789), Bohemian composer
- Vít Kopřiva (born 1997), Czech tennis player

== See also ==
- Kopriva (disambiguation)
