= Koprivnik =

Koprivnik may refer to:

In Kosovo:

- Kopranik, a mountain known as Koprivnik in Serbian

In Slovenia:

- Koprivnik Castle, a castle ruin above the village of Trojica, near Moravče in central Slovenia
- Koprivnik, Kočevje, a settlement in the Municipality of Kočevje
- Koprivnik, Kostanjevica na Krki, a settlement in the Municipality of Kostanjevica na Krki
- Koprivnik, Žiri, a settlement in the Municipality of Žiri
- Koprivnik v Bohinju, a settlement in the Municipality of Bohinj
- Kruplivnik, a settlement in the Municipality of Grad, in older sources also Koprivnik
