= Koprivnica, Bardejov District =

Koprivnica
- Municipality
- Flag

- Location of Koprivnica in the Prešov Region Location of Koprivnica in Slovakia
- Coordinates: 49.17°N 21.40°E
- Country: Slovakia
- Region: Prešov Region
- District: Bardejov District
- First mentioned: 1283

Area
  - Total: 14.16 km^{2} (5.47 sq mi)
- Elevation: 262 m (860 ft)

Population (2025)
  - Total: 656
- Time zone: UTC+1 (CET)
  - Summer (DST): UTC+2 (CEST)
- Postal code: 864 5
- Area code: +421 54
- Vehicle registration plate (until 2022): BJ
- Website: www.koprivnica.sk

Koprivnica is a village and municipality in Bardejov District in the Prešov Region of north-east Slovakia.

== History ==
In historical records the village was first mentioned in 1283.

== Geography ==
The municipality lies at an altitude of 262 metres (860 ft) and covers an area of 14.16 km^{2} (5.47 sq mi) (2025).

== Population ==
Population statistic (10 years)
Year	1995	2005	2015	2025
Count	672	695	689	656
Difference		+3.42%	−0.86%	−4.78%

Population statistic
Year	2024	2025
Count	663	656
Difference		−1.05%

It has a population of 656 people (31 December 2025).

=== Ethnicity ===
Census 2021 (1+ %)
Ethnicity	Number	Fraction
Slovak	642	98.46%
Total	652	

In year 2021 was 652 people by ethnicity 642 as Slovak, 6 as Not found out, 2 as Czech, 2 as Rusyn, 1 as Ukrainian, 1 as Polish and 1 as Hungarian.

Note on population: The difference values of population numbers in the table "Population statistic" and in the sections "Ethnicity" & "Religion" is caused by the use of various statistical methods.

=== Religion ===
Census 2021 (1+ %)
Religion	Number	Fraction
Roman Catholic Church	585	89.72%
Evangelical Church	21	3.22%
None	21	3.22%
Greek Catholic Church	16	2.45%
Total	652	

In year 2021 was 652 people by religion 585 from Roman Catholic Church, 21 from Evangelical Church, 21 from None, 16 from Greek Catholic Church, 4 from Not found out, 4 from Other and 1 from Christian Congregations in Slovakia.

== Genealogical resources ==
The records for genealogical research are available at the state archive "Statny Archiv in Presov, Slovakia"

- Roman Catholic church records (births/marriages/deaths): 1848–1908 (parish A)
- Greek Catholic church records (births/marriages/deaths): 1854–1901 (parish B)
- Lutheran church records (births/marriages/deaths): 1747–1895 (parish B)

== See also ==
- List of municipalities and towns in Slovakia
