= Jovan Koprivica =

Serbian basketball player

Personal information
- Born: 15 July 1982 (age 44) Belgrade, SR Serbia, SFR Yugoslavia
- Listed height: 1.98 m (6 ft 6 in)
- Listed weight: 104 kg (229 lb)

Career information
- NBA draft: 2004: undrafted
- Playing career: 1998–2012
- Position: Small forward
- Number: 6, 7, 19, 15

Career history
- 1998–2001: Beopetrol
- 2001–2005: Crvena zvezda
- 2006: Panellinios
- 2006–2007: Igokea Partizan
- 2007–2008: Ergonom
- 2008–2009: Politekhnika-Halychyna
- 2009–2010: Kryvbas
- 2011–2012: OKK Beograd

Career highlights
- Serbian Cup winner (2004); Bosnian Cup winner (2007)

Jovan Koprivica (Serbian: Јован Копривица, born 15 July 1982) is a Serbian former professional basketball player.

== Professional career ==
Koprivica made a senior team debut for the Beopetrol of the YUBA League in 1998. In 2001 he signed for the Crvena zvezda. He won the Radivoj Korać Cup in 2004. He had a lot of problems with injuries which resulted in him being waived by the Zvezda following the conclusion of the 2004–05 season.

After recovering from injury at the end of December 2005, he signed a contract with the Greek team Panellinios until the end of the 2005–06 season. During the 2006–07 season he played for the Igokea Partizan from Bosnia and Herzegovina. On 14 November 2007, he signed an "open" contract with the Ergonom from Niš. After that, he spent two seasons in the Ukrainian SuperLeague where he played for the Politekhnika-Halychyna and Kryvbas. He missed entire 2010–11 season.

On 3 November 2011, he signed a contract with OKK Beograd where he finished his playing career in beginning of 2012–13 season.

== National team career ==
Koprivica was a member of the FR Yugoslavia national youth teams that participated at the 2000 FIBA Europe Under-18 Championship and 2002 FIBA Europe Under-20 Championship.

== Post-playing career ==
On 28 March 2017, Koprivica got elected as the secretary-general of the Belgrade Sports Association (SSaB). On 5 July 2017, he was appointed as executive director of the 2018 EuroLeague Final Four which be held in Belgrade in May 2018.

== Career achievements and awards ==
- Serbian Cup winner: 1 (with Crvena zvezda: 2003–04)
- Bosnian Cup winner: 1 (with Igokea Partizan: 2006–07)

== Personal life ==
Koprivica, was born in Belgrade, SR Serbia, SFR Yugoslavia, to former basketball player Žarko Koprivica, who also played for the Crvena zvezda. Jovan's mother is Marija. His younger brother, Nikola, played college basketball for Washington State.

== See also ==
- List of father-and-son combinations who have played for Crvena zvezda
