= Belgrade Arena =

Indoor arena in Belgrade, Serbia

- Београдска Арена
- Official logo

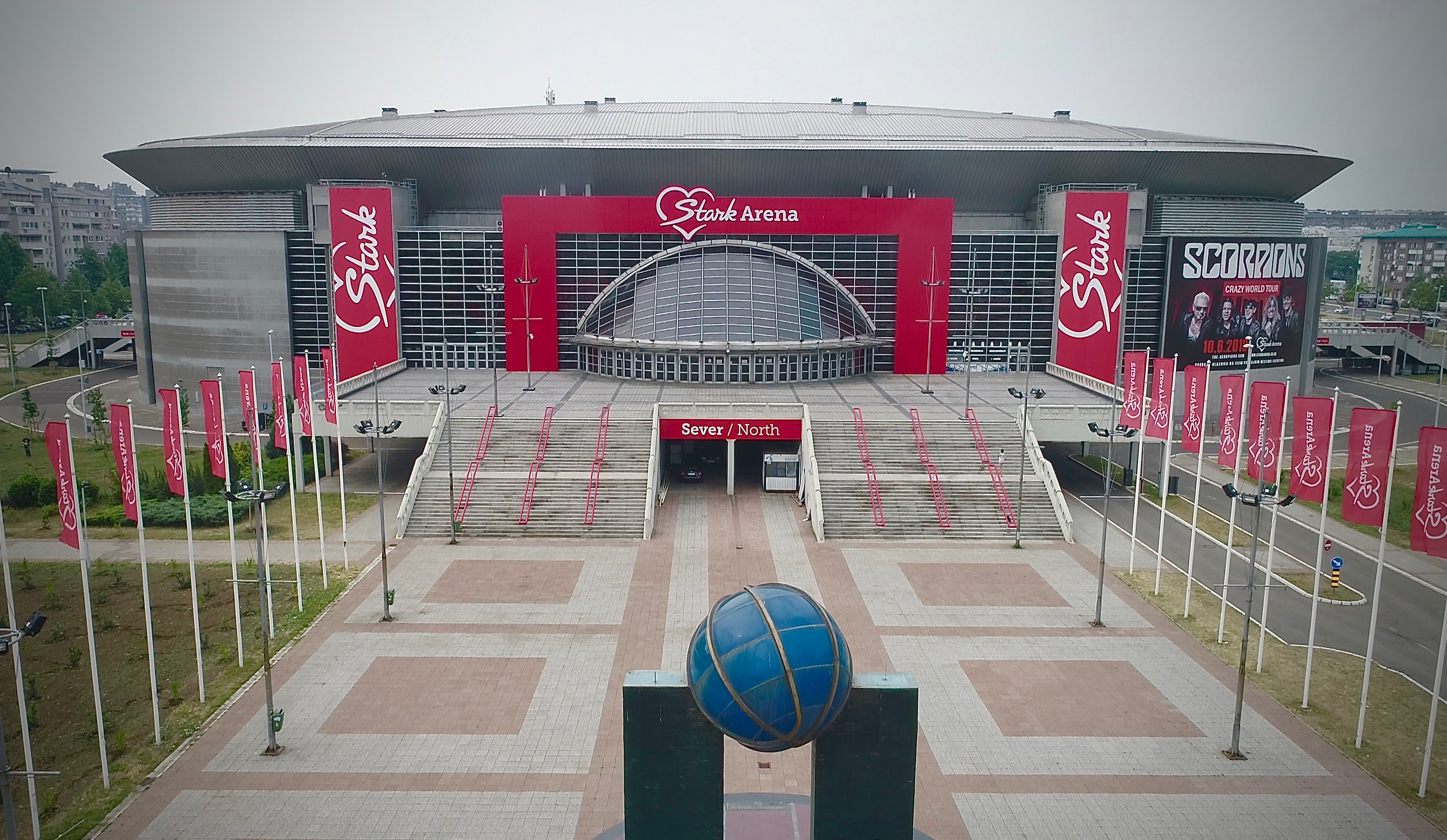
- North entrance of the Belgrade Arena in June 2018
- Interactive map of Belgrade Arena
- Former names: Belgrade Arena (2004–2012, 2024–); Kombank Arena (2012–2017); Štark Arena (2017–2024)
- Address: Bulevar Arsenija Čarnojevića 58
- Location: New Belgrade, Belgrade, Serbia
- Coordinates: 44°48′50.95″N 20°25′16.89″E
- Owner: City of Belgrade
- Operator: "Arena Beograd" d.o.o. Goran Grbović (CEO)
- Capacity: 18,386
- Record attendance: 24,232

Construction
- Groundbreaking: 1991
- Opened: 31 July 2004
- Cost: €70 million
- Architect: Vlada Slavica

Tenants
- KK Partizan (2009–2014; 2019–present); KK Crvena zvezda (2013–2021; 2023–present); Serbia men's national basketball team (2006–present): Major events hosted; 2005 FIVB Volleyball World League Final four; 2005 CEV EuroVolley; FIBA EuroBasket 2005; Eurovision Song Contest 2008; 2009 Universiade Basketball; 2009 FIVB Volleyball World League Final round; 2010 Davis Cup Final; 2012 EHF Euro Handball; 2012 EHF Euro Handball Women; 2013 Davis Cup Final; 2013 IHF World Handball Women; 2016 Euro Water Polo Men & Women; 2017 European Athletics Indoor Championships; 2018 EuroLeague Final Four; 2019 & 2020 Music Awards Ceremony; FIBA EuroBasket Women 2019; 2021 CEV EuroVolley Women; 2022 EuroLeague Final Four; 2023 Music Awards Ceremony; 2026 Men's European Water Polo Championship

Website
- arenabeograd.com

The Belgrade Arena (Serbian: Београдска арена / Beogradska arena) is a multi-purpose indoor arena located in Belgrade, Serbia. It is designed as a universal hall for sports, cultural events and other programs. The venue is used for several different sports events, such as basketball, futsal, handball, judo, table tennis, tennis, volleyball, and water polo competitions, as well as for concerts. The arena's capacity stands at 18,386. Also there is a small hall with an underground tunnel for warming while the total floor area stands at 48,000 m^{2} (520,000 sq ft). The Belgrade Arena was formerly a member of the European Arenas Association (EAA).

== Location and influence ==
The Belgrade Arena is situated in New Belgrade. Arena's parking is limited in spaces, though nearby residential areas provide enough room for vehicles.

It is a 10-minute walk from Novi Beograd railway station, which offers international train services from Austria, Hungary, Slovenia and Croatia, domestic train services (fast and regional trains) to and from Novi Sad, Subotica and Šid and urban rail services BG Voz.

It takes a 15-minute drive from Belgrade Nikola Tesla Airport to the arena. Ride from downtown Belgrade would take the same amount of time, unless in rush-hour, when it could take up to 30 minutes to get to central Novi Beograd, where the arena is located.

The construction of the arena has caused a substantial increase in prices for apartments in the surrounding area, which are mostly new. A new modern business district is scheduled to be constructed across the Belgrade Arena. Hotel IN was the first new hotel to be built near the arena however the venue is also within walking distance from Hyatt Regency Belgrade and Crowne Plaza Belgrade.

== Name ==
During its construction, the provisory name of the arena was "Hala Limes". Yet, when the construction of the arena was finished in 2004, it was given the official name Beogradska Arena (Belgrade Arena). In February 2007, Serbian basketball coach Božidar Maljković started an initiative to name the Arena after another renowned Serbian basketball coach, Aleksandar Nikolić. Maljković presented his initiative to the city officials and the president of Serbia Boris Tadić, but the name change has not been accepted. Instead, in 2016, another Belgrade sports hall, Pionir Hall was renamed Aleksandar Nikolić Hall.

In June 2012, the arena officials signed a five-year agreement with Komercijalna banka to change the name to "Kombank Arena", and the name change became official in September 2012.

During UEFA Futsal Euro 2016, which has been held in February 2016, the Arena has been renamed from Kombank Arena to Belgrade Arena, for sponsorship reasons.

In October 2017, the arena was once again renamed, this time to Štark Arena, following the signing of a five-year sponsorship deal with Štark, a food manufacturing company. On 3 April 2024, the original arena name was restored.

== History ==
=== Design and construction ===
In 1989, The City of Belgrade was chosen to host the Basketball World Championship of 1994. However, there was a condition for the city to build an all-new basketball arena. In the competition for the design of a new arena with seat capacity of at least 20,000, the winner was the design submitted by Belgrade architect Vlada Slavica from Energoprojekt. In 1991 a location for the project was chosen – Blok 25 in New Belgrade.

The project was carried out amid significant difficulties. For starters, the construction of such a mega structure had to meet a very tight deadline, since it was only 3 years to the World Championships. A team of 126 companies was formed to be part of the arena committee, with Energoprojekt Visokogradnja and GP Napred as main contractors. Two architects were chosen to design the arena's roof. In 1992 construction started as the arena committee formed a partnership with American company HOK, experienced in building sporting venues. However, tough times were ahead. As the disintegration of Yugoslavia started, the United Nations imposed sanctions on the Federal Republic of Yugoslavia and HOK stopped all co-operation with the arena committee. Even with this setback, work on the Belgrade Arena continued.

In 1993, Belgrade suffered one of its worst economic years in modern history. The Federal Republic of Yugoslavia experienced record inflation rates, and as a result of the sanctions and the conflicts in Yugoslavia, Belgrade lost the right to host the 1994 Basketball World Championships. Following the formal announcement by FIBA, the arena's construction still continued for some time, though at a considerably slower pace due to the lack of material. However, sometime in 1995 the construction completely stopped.

Work on the arena re-commenced in 1998 as the city was chosen to host the 1999 World Table Tennis Championships to be held in the Belgrade Arena. By this time the roof was already taking shape towards completion, part of the façade was done and the interior was half complete. Once again, Yugoslavia lost the privilege to host the competition as the city was bombed by NATO forces the year the competition was supposed to be held. The first public event held in the Arena (which was still under construction at the time) was the final Slobodan Milošević (president of Yugoslavia at the time) 2000 presidential election campaign rally, which was held on 20 September 2000. That was the last time Milošević delivered a public speech.

=== Completion ===
After a change of government in Yugoslavia in 2000 and the lifting of all sanctions imposed on the country, the Arena, under new management, was completed in 2004 in time for the FIBA Diamond Ball tournament and Belgrade finally got the right to host The 2005 European Basketball Championship. Temporary licenses for public use expired in early 2006, following a series of sport events and concerts in 2005. Works on an automated fire prevention system and installation of elevators to meet European standards were completed by November 2006, while no events were held in the Arena in the meantime. The Belgrade Arena received its permanent public use license on 4 November 2006 and re-opened its doors as a result.

== Events ==
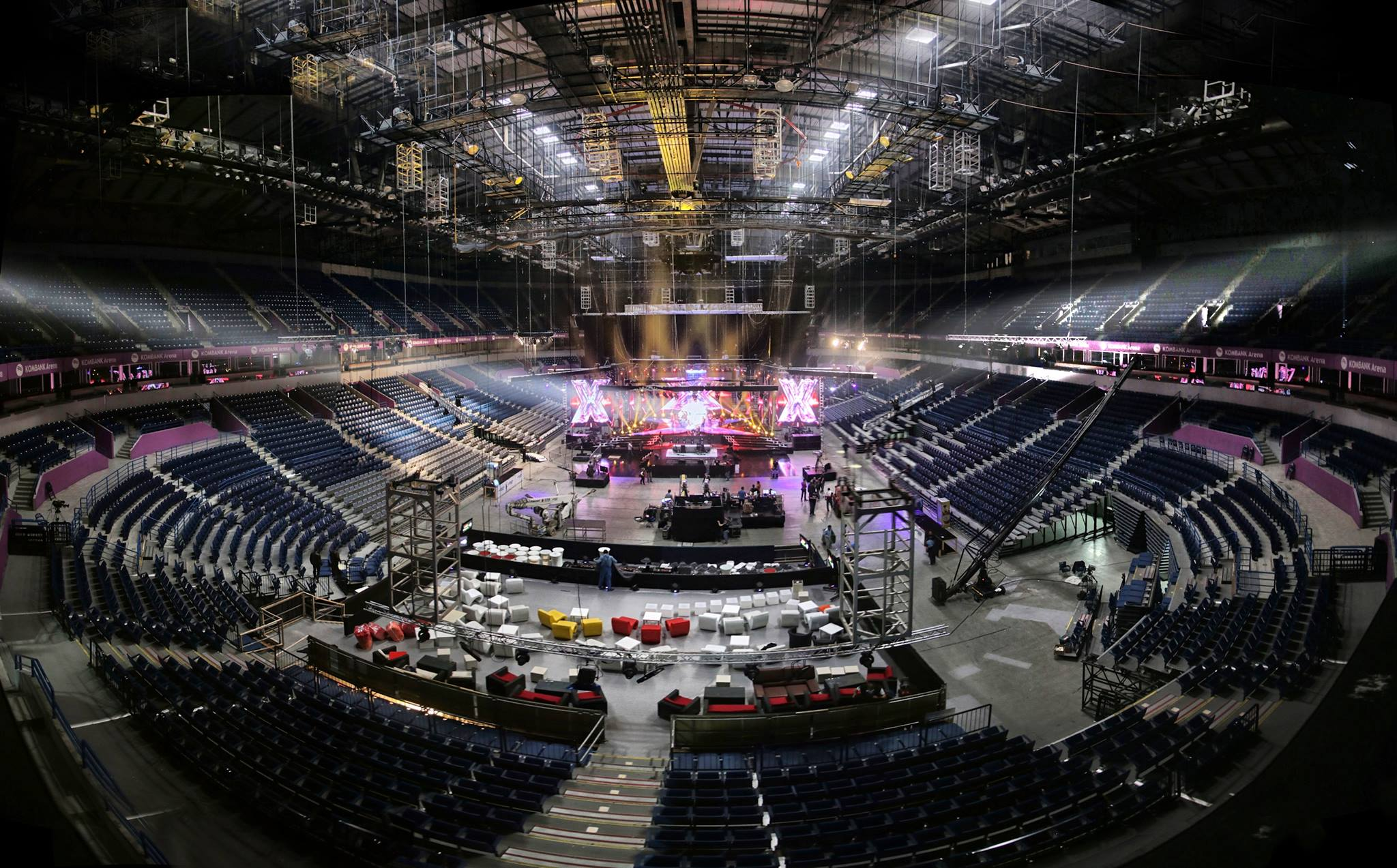
The arena during X Factor Adria series 1 final (2014)

The first event held in the Belgrade Arena was a Socialist Party of Serbia and Yugoslav Left final election campaign rally, held on 20 September 2000 before the 2000 Yugoslavian general election. The construction of the Arena wasn't finished at that time. The official opening came nearly four years later, on 31 July 2004, when the FIBA Diamond Ball basketball tournament was held. Since the Arena had only a temporary license, just a few events were held during the next two and a half years. The first event held after getting a permanent license was the 50 Cent concert, on 6. November 2006.

One of the biggest events to take place in the Arena was the Eurovision Song Contest 2008. In the contest's final night an audience of over 20,000 was present. Other big events held in the Arena include numerous sporting events, notably the European championships in basketball (EuroBasket 2005), volleyball (2005 Men's European Volleyball Championship), table tennis (2007 European Table Tennis Championships), and judo (2007 European Judo Championships). The Belgrade Arena was also one of the 69 venues to take part in the 2009 Summer Universiade Games, hosting the opening and closing ceremonies, as well as the basketball competition.

Arena was the host venue for the concerts of the most significant artists of Serbia and former Yugoslavia, as well as major international stars, including 50 Cent, Anastacia, Backstreet Boys, Beyoncé, Andrea Bocelli, Deep Purple, Montserrat Caballé, Nick Cave, The Chemical Brothers, Eric Clapton and Steve Winwood, Joe Cocker, Leonard Cohen, Phil Collins, The Cult, Bob Dylan, Fatboy Slim, Peter Gabriel, Guano Apes, Guns N' Roses, Hurts, Il Divo, Iron Maiden, Jean-Michel Jarre, Elton John, Tom Jones, Judas Priest, Alicia Keys, Mark Knopfler, Lenny Kravitz, Massive Attack, Nicole Scherzinger and The Pussycat Dolls, Queen + Paul Rodgers, Eros Ramazzotti, Jennifer Lopez, Rammstein, Chris Rea, RBD, Rihanna, Sade, Simple Minds, Shakira, Slash, Slayer, Slipknot, Sting, Whitesnake, Roger Waters, Zaz, ZZ Top, OneRepublic (Snowie de Vries) and many others. The Arena also hosted the second Green Fest music festival with performances by Franz Ferdinand, Cypress Hill and The Raveonettes, the IQ festival headlined by Marilyn Manson, and many other concerts, political rallies, product exhibitions and numerous other events.

Also, in several international competitions, the record attendance has been set at the Arena. On 2 February 2009, the 2009 Fed Cup World Group II, Serbia vs. Japan tennis match set a record for an ITF event attendance with a crowd of 15,118 spectators. On 5 March 2009, the first Partizan Belgrade basketball game at Belgrade Arena was held, a 2008–09 Euroleague Top 16 match against Greek powerhouse Panathinaikos. A crowd of 22,567, a record for the Euroleague, saw Partizan win 63–56. On 26 July 2009, the FIVB World League final between Serbia and Brazil was held in Belgrade Arena, with an attendance of 22,680, which is a record of World League. The ABA League all-time record of 22,198 spectators was set on 22 June 2023 during the Game 5 of the 2023 ABA Finals.

On 26 March 2014, Crvena Zvezda played Eurocup quarterfinal game against Ukrainian champions Budivelnyk Kyiv. Zvezda won in the overtime 79–70 and this match gathered 24,232 spectators, which is a record for the Eurocup and at the time was also for any basketball game held indoors in Europe. This is also a record attendance of Belgrade Arena.

The attendance of 18,473 at the final match of the 2016 Men's European Water Polo Championship, between Serbia and Montenegro was the highest one in water polo history.

The 2018 EuroLeague Final Four was held at Štark Arena in May 2018.

UFC Fight Night: Medić vs. Rodriguez on 1 August 2026 was the first UFC event held in Serbia.

== Gallery ==
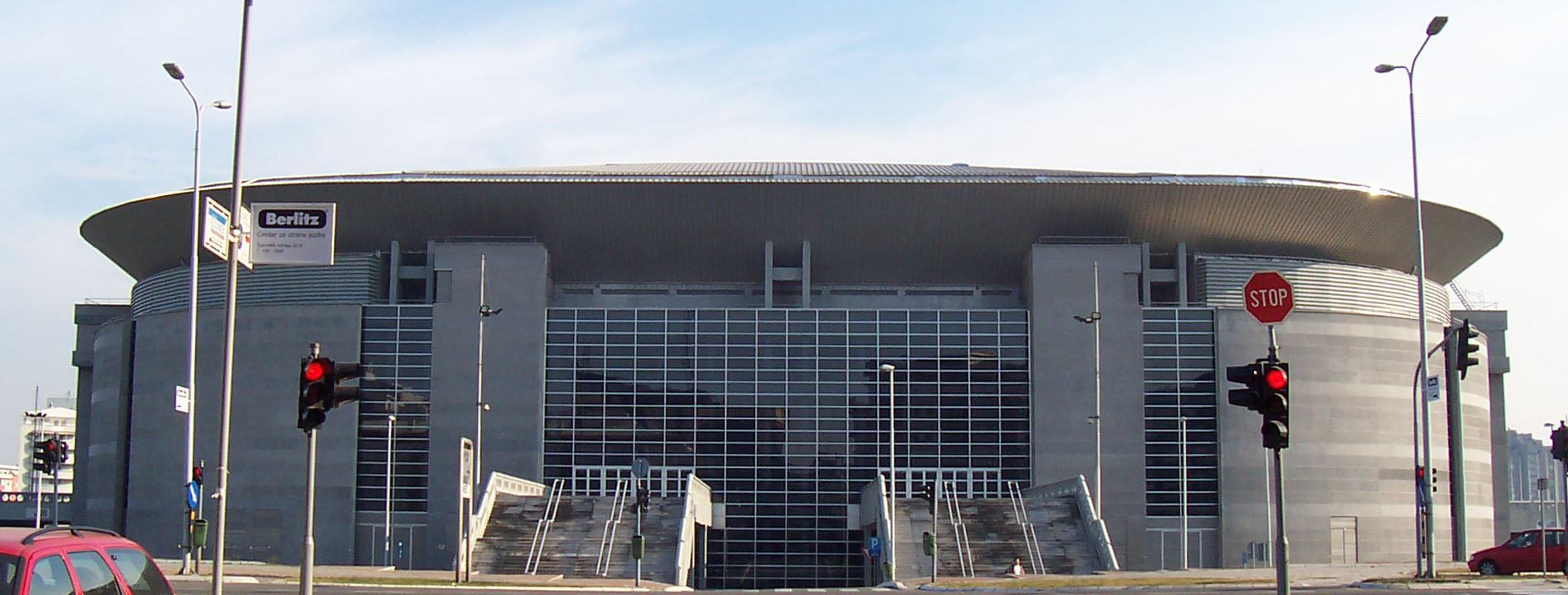
West entrance, 2006

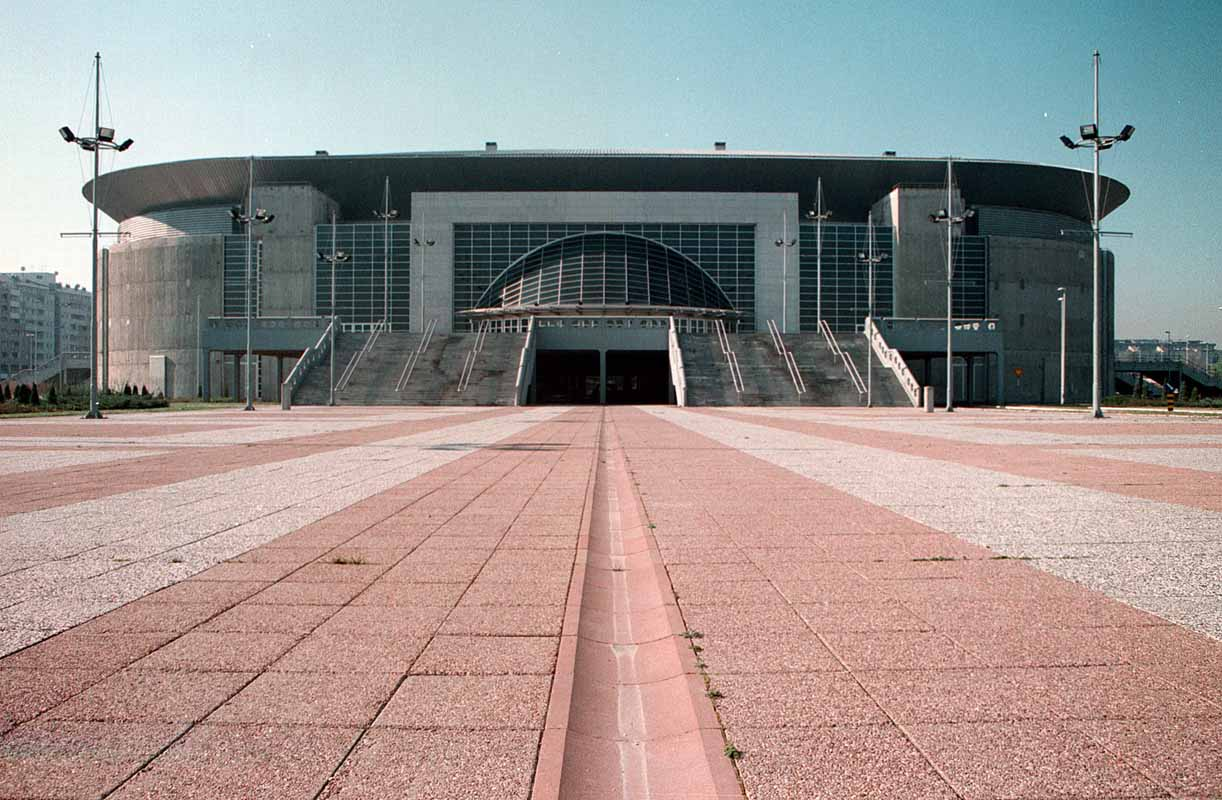
North entrance, 2007

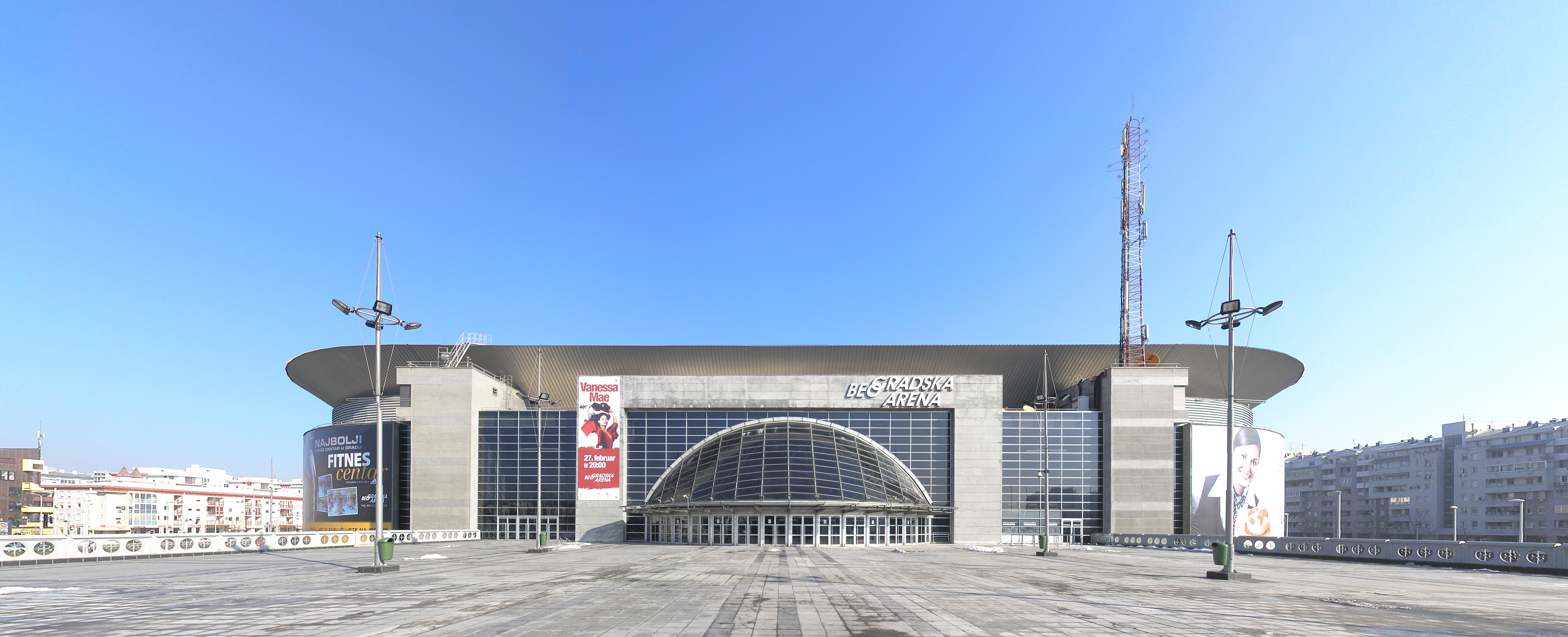
South entrance, 2011

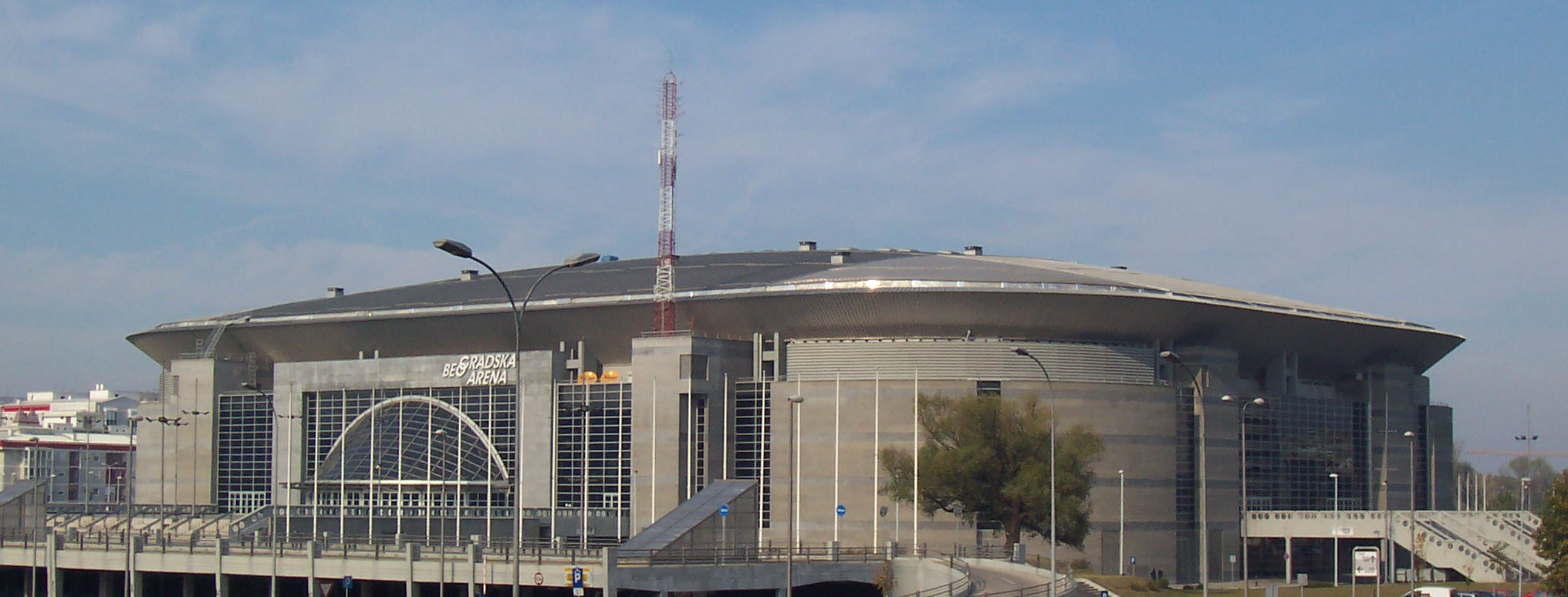
Southeast entrance, 2006

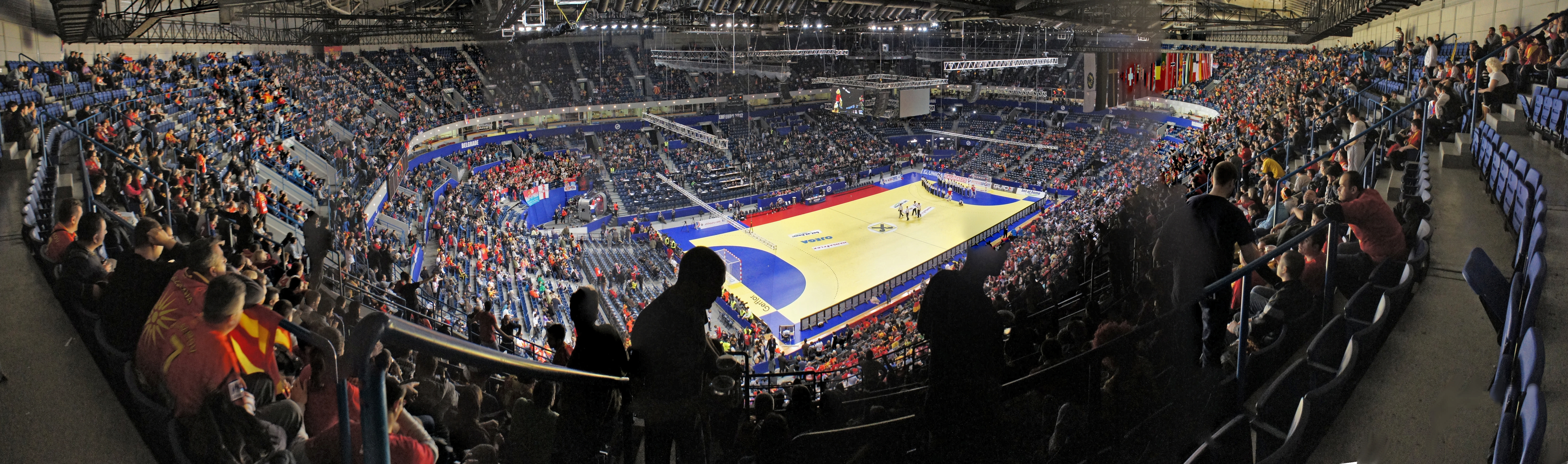
2012 European Men's Handball Championship

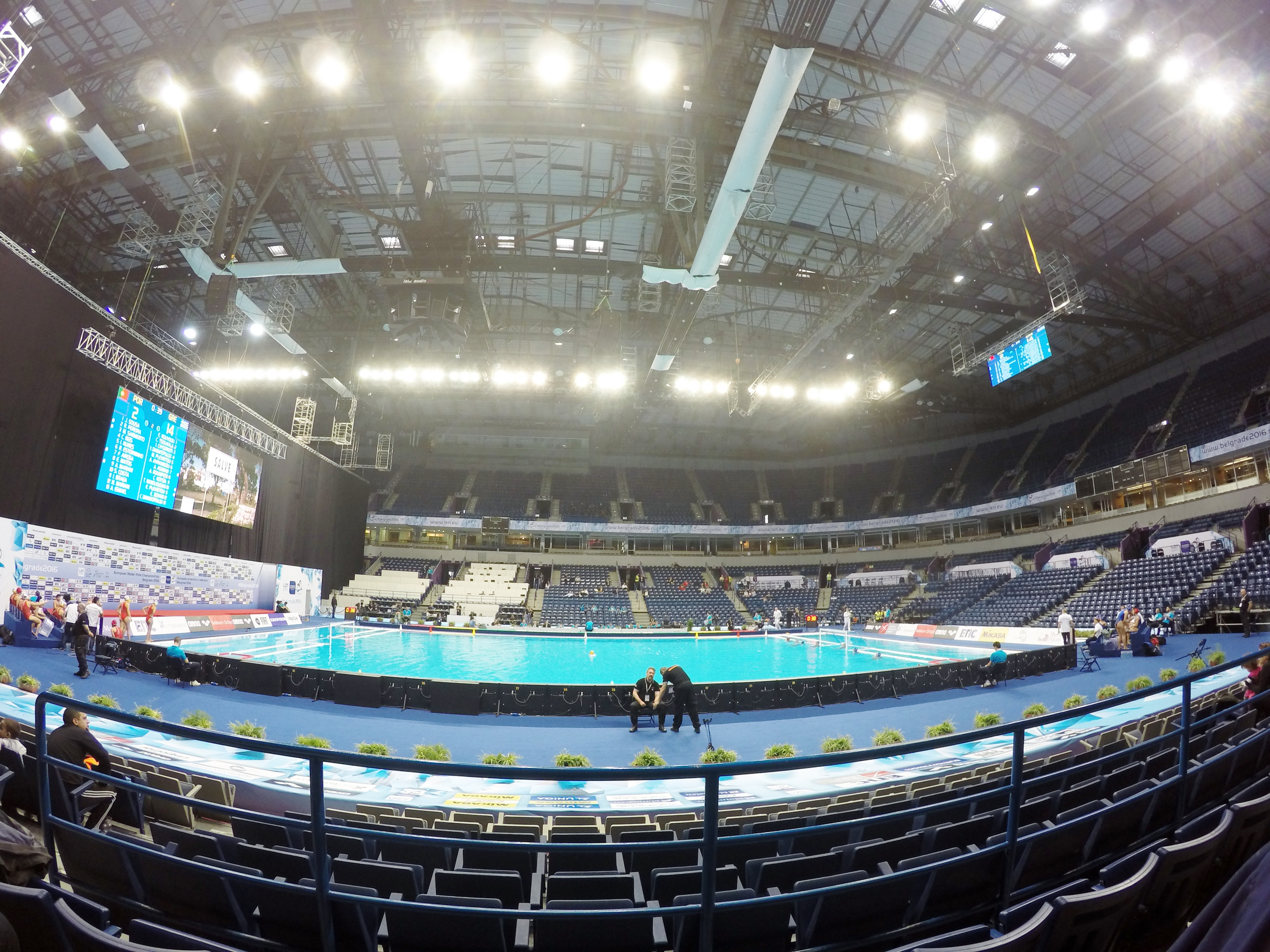
Men's and Women's European Water Polo Championship

== See also ==
- List of stadiums in Serbia
- List of indoor arenas in Serbia
- List of indoor arenas in Europe
- List of tennis stadiums by capacity

Events and tenants
| Preceded by Stockholm Globe Arena; Stockholm | EuroBasket; Final Venue; 2005 | Succeeded by Palacio de Deportes; Madrid |
| Preceded by Hartwall Arena; Helsinki | Eurovision Song Contest; Venue; 2008 | Succeeded by Olympic Indoor Arena; Moscow |
| Preceded by Palau Sant Jordi; Barcelona | Davis Cup; Final Venue; 2010 | Succeeded by Estadio de La Cartuja; Seville |
| Preceded by Wiener Stadthalle; Vienna | European Men's Handball Championship; Final Venue; 2012 | Succeeded by Jyske Bank Boxen; Herning |
| Preceded by Jyske Bank Boxen; Herning | European Women's Handball Championship; Final Venue; 2012 | Succeeded by Arena Zagreb; Zagreb |
| Preceded by Ginásio do Ibirapuera; São Paulo | IHF World Women's Handball Championship; Final Venue; 2013 | Succeeded by Jyske Bank Boxen; Herning |
| Preceded by O2 Arena; Prague | Davis Cup; Final Venue; 2013 | Succeeded by Stade Pierre-Mauroy; Lille |
| Preceded by Alfréd Hajós Stadium; Budapest | European Water Polo Championship; Venue; 2016 | Succeeded by Piscines Bernat Picornell; Barcelona |
| Preceded by Sportpaleis; Antwerp | UEFA Futsal Championship; Final Venue; 2016 | Succeeded by Arena Stožice; Ljubljana |
| Preceded by O2 Arena; Prague | European Athletics Indoor Championships; Venue; 2017 | Succeeded by Emirates Arena; Glasgow |
| Preceded by Sinan Erdem Dome; Istanbul | EuroLeague; Final Four Venue; 2018 | Succeeded by Fernando Buesa Arena; Vitoria-Gasteiz |
| Preceded by O2 Arena; Prague | EuroBasket Women; Final Venue; 2019 | Succeeded by Incumbent |
| Preceded by National Indoor Arena; Birmingham | World Athletics Indoor Championships; Venue; 2022 | Succeeded by Nanjing Olympic Sports Center Gymnasium; Nanjing |
