= Koprivnica (Zaječar) =

Koprivnica Копривница
- Village
- Location within Serbia
- Coordinates: 44°03′02″N 22°19′07″E
- Country: Serbia
- District: Zaječar District
- Municipality: Zaječar

Population (2002)
  - Total: 532
- Time zone: UTC+1 (CET)
  - Summer (DST): UTC+2 (CEST)

Koprivnica is a village in the municipality of Zaječar, Serbia. According to the 2002 census, the village had a population of 532 people.
