= Aleksei Kotishevskiy =

Russian basketball player

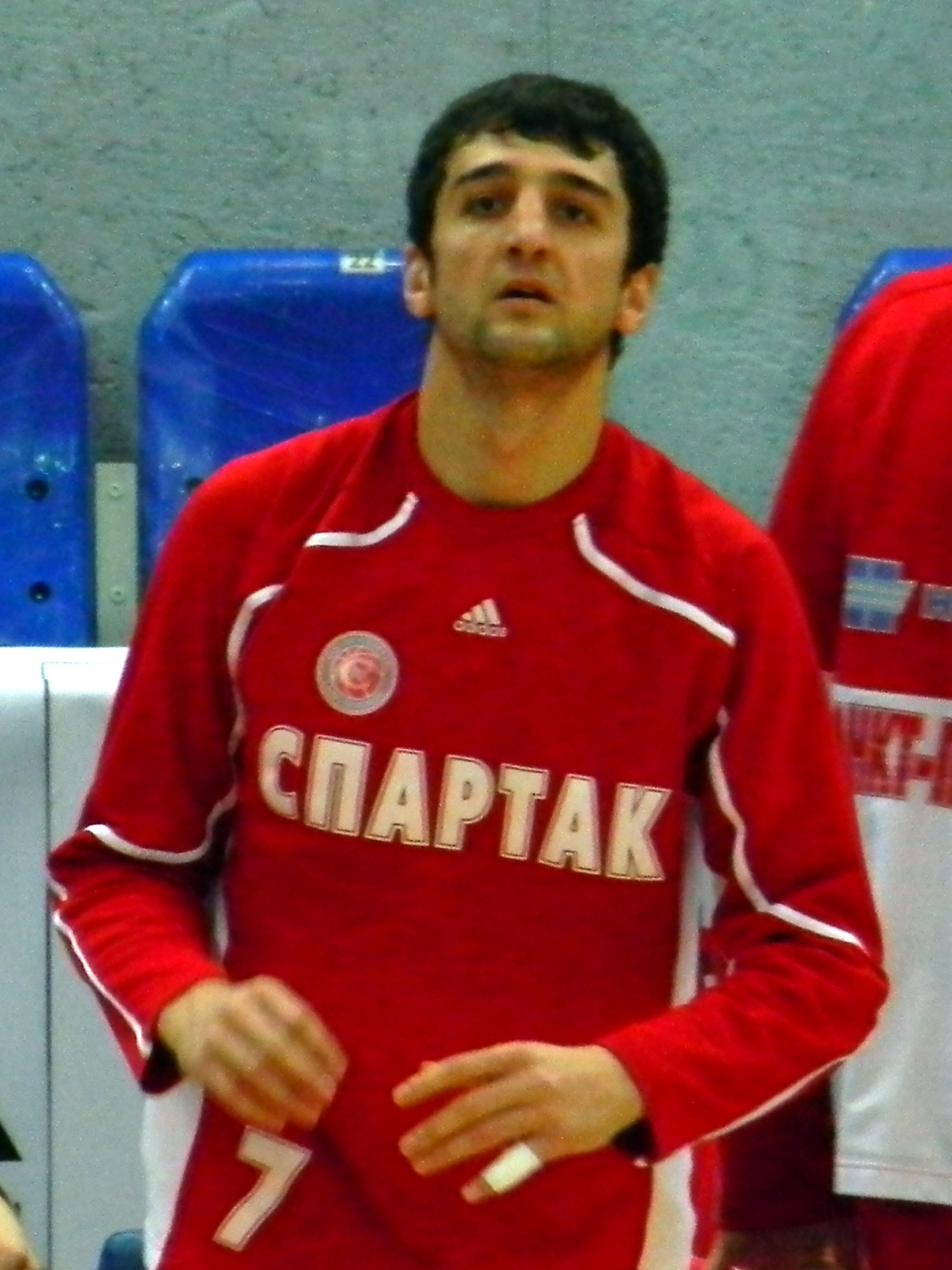

No. 7 – Stroitel Engels
- Position: Shooting guard
- League: Russian Super League 2

Personal information
- Born: April 4, 1985 (age 41) Bishkek, Soviet Union
- Listed height: 1.96 m (6 ft 5 in)
- Listed weight: 93 kg (205 lb)

Career information
- NBA draft: 2007: undrafted
- Playing career: 2002–present

Career history
- 2002–2004: Ural Great Perm
- 2004–2006: CSK VVS Samara
- 2006–2008: BC Sojuz Zaretchny
- 2008–2009: Avtodor Saratov
- 2009–2010: Radnički Kragujevac
- 2010–2012: Spartak Saint Petersburg
- 2012–2014: Yenisey Krasnoyarsk
- 2014: Avtodor Saratov
- 2014–present: Stroitel Engels

Aleksei Kotishevskiy (born April 4, 1985) is a Russian professional basketball player. He is a 1.96 m (6 ft 5 in) tall shooting guard who currently plays for Stroitel Engels.
