= Žarko Koprivica =

Serbian basketball player and executive

Personal information
- Born: 8 May 1956 (age 70) Prokuplje, FPR Yugoslavia

Career information
- NBA draft: 1978: undrafted
- Playing career: 1974–1981
- Position: Center
- Number: 7

Career history
- 1974–1981: Crvena zvezda

Career highlights
- Yugoslav Cup winner (1975)
Medals
Men's basketball
Representing Yugoslavia
European Championship for Cadets
Bronze medal – third place	1975 Greece	U16 Team

Žarko Koprivica (Serbian Cyrillic: Жарко Копривица; born May 8, 1956) is a Serbian basketball executive and former professional player.

== Playing career ==
Koprivica played for Crvena zvezda of the Yugoslav Federal League. Over 181 games he averaged 14.9 points per game. He won one Yugoslav Cup in his first senior season. In the 1978–79 season, he averaged 29.3 points per game.

== National team career ==
Koprivica was a member of the Yugoslav national U16 team that won the bronze medal at the 1975 European Championship for Cadets.

== Post-playing career ==
=== AS Basket ===
Koprivica is a founder and the president of the AS Basket, a basketball club for youth based in Belgrade. The club is founded in 1997. Players who played for the youth team of AS Basket are: Marko Kešelj, Aleksandar Cvetković, Ivan Marinković, Brano Đukanović and many others.

== Career achievements ==
- Yugoslav Cup winner: 1 (with Crvena zvezda: 1974–75).

== Personal life ==
Žarko Koprivica is married to Marija (born 1957). They have two sons: Jovan (born 1982) and Nikola (born 1988). Both sons were professional basketball players. Jovan played for Crvena zvezda, Panellinios, Politekhnika-Halychyna, Kryvbas and OKK Beograd. Nikola played college basketball for the Washington State, and for the Superfund and Iraklis.

== See also ==
- List of father-and-son combinations who have played for Crvena zvezda
