= Olga Yakovleva (basketball, born 1986) =

Russian basketball player

Olga Yakovleva (sometimes spelled Iakovleva; June 15, 1986 – August 8, 2010) was a Russian women's basketball player.

Olga was born in Vologda, Russia and represented her country in the FIBA under-19 and under-21 World Championships. In 2009, Olga was selected as Eurobasket.com All-Russian Superleague Honorable Mention. That same year, she won silver at the World University Games in Belgrade.

Olga played center for the Vologda-Chevakata Russian basketball team. She was 6ft 5in tall and helped Vologda-Chevakata make it to the Russian Cup (basketball) semifinals in 2010.

== Death ==
On August 8, 2010, Olga Yakovleva drowned in the Vologda-Chevakata training camp pool, in Yuzhne near Odesa, Ukraine. The 24-year-old former Russian youth international player was relaxing in the pool with her colleagues and team coach Yury Zimin. He later told Lifenews.ru how he saw her start to swim underwater, and then saw her surface with “glassy eyes”. Medics said it was a “one in a million” accident: the autopsy showed no evidence of a seizure.

== Awards and accomplishments ==
- Russian U19 National Team -2005
- World Championships U19 -2005 (semifinals)
- World Championships U21 in Tunisia -2005
- Europe Cup Quarterfinals -2006, 2007
- Russian U21 National Team -2005, 2007
- World Championships U21 in Moscow Region (Russia) -2007
- Russian University National Team -2007, 2009
- World University Championships in Bangkok -2007
- Eurobasket.com All-Russian Superleague Honorable Mention -2009
- 2009 Summer Universiade in Belgrade (Serbia) (Silver): 5 games: 11.4ppg, 3.2rpg, 1.4apg, 1.4spg, FGP: 52.9%, FT: 91.3%
- Russian Cup Semifinals
