= Nikola Koprivica =

Serbian basketball player

Personal information
- Born: June 11, 1988 (age 38) Belgrade, SR Serbia, SFR Yugoslavia
- Listed height: 1.99 m (6 ft 6 in)
- Listed weight: 98 kg (216 lb)

Career information
- College: Washington State (2006–2010)
- NBA draft: 2010: undrafted
- Playing career: 2005–2011
- Position: Shooting guard / small forward
- Number: 4, 13
- Coaching career: 2011–2016

Career history

Playing
- 2005–2006: Atlas
- 2010: Superfund
- 2010–2011: Iraklis

Coaching
- 2011–2014: AS Basket (youth)
- 2014–2016: Truman (assistant)

Career highlights
- As player: 2× Pac-10 All-Academic First team (2009, 2010); Pac-10 All-Academic Second team (2008)
Medals
Men's basketball
Representing Serbia
Summer Universiade
Gold medal – first place	2009 Belgrade	Univ. Team
U20 European Championship
Gold medal – first place	2008 Latvia	U20 Team

Nikola Koprivica (Serbian: Никола Копривица, born June 11, 1988) is a Serbian professional basketball scout and former basketball coach and player. He played college basketball for the Washington State Cougars

== College career ==
As a freshman, Koprivica appeared in 15 games (including four starts) at Washington State University in their 2006–07 season. He made the first career start against the San Diego State on December 21, 2006. Seven days later, on December 28, he scored season/career-high 12 points against the UCLA.

As a sophomore, Koprivica appeared in 34 of 35 games in the Cougars' 2007–08 season. On December 9, 2007, he tied career-high 12 points in 19 minutes knocking down 5-of-6 from the field against Portland State. On March 20, 2008, he played seven minutes in his NCAA tournament debut against Winthrop. He earned Pacific-10 Conference men's basketball All-Academic Second team.

As a junior, Koprivica appeared in all 33 games, including 18 starts, in the Cougars' 2008–09 season where he played with the future NBA All-Star Klay Thompson. On November 8, 2008, he pulled down career-high eight rebounds in season-opener against Mississippi Valley State. On February 7, 2009, he dished out career-high five assists against California. At the end of the season, he was selected for the first time to Pacific-10 Conference All-Academic First team.

As a senior, Koprivica appeared in all 31 games, including 10 starts in the Cougars' 2009–10 season. He was ranked third on the team and 15th in the Pac-10 with 5.1 rebounds per game. He led team and ranked third in the conference with a .426 (43-for-101) for 3-point field goal percentage. On December 2, 2009, he contributed eight points, four rebounds, and four assists at lost from Gonzaga. On December 2, he tied a career high with 11 rebounds against Air Force. He scored a career high 23 points against Portland State on December 19. At the end of the season, he was selected for the second time to Pacific-10 Conference All-Academic First team.

Koprivica ended his college career with 85 wins, ranking as the second winningest player in the school history.

== Professional career ==
On July 13, 2004, Koprivica signed a two-year contract with the Atlas of the Serbia-Montenegro First League. After the expiration of the contract he went to the United States where he planned to play college basketball.

After went undrafted at the 2010 NBA draft, Koprivica moved back to Belgrade where he sign with the Superfund of the Basketball League of Serbia. In November 2010, he signed with Iraklis of the Greek League

In 2011, at the age of 23, he ended promising basketball playing career due to health problems.

== National team career ==
Koprivica was a member and the team captain of the Serbia national under-20 team that won the gold medal at the 2008 FIBA Europe Championship. Over eight tournament games, he averaged 4.5 points, 1.5 rebounds and 1.9 assists per game. Also, he was a member and the team captain of the Serbian men's university basketball team that won the gold medal at the 2009 Summer Universiade in Belgrade, Serbia.

He also represented Serbia and Montenegro at the 2006 FIBA Europe Under-18 Championship and the 2004 FIBA Europe Under-16 Championship.

== Post-playing career ==
Koprivica began his coaching career in 2011 at the AS Basket from Belgrade. In July 2014, he became an assistant coach for the Truman Bulldogs of the Great Lakes Valley Conference (NCAA Division II). Truman's head coach Matt Woodley was a member of coaching staff for the Washington State while Koprivica played there.

== Personal life ==
Koprivica, was born in Belgrade, SR Serbia, SFR Yugoslavia, to former basketball player Žarko Koprivica, who played for the Crvena zvezda. Nikola's mother is Marija. His older brother, Jovan, played basketball for Crvena zvezda and OKK Beograd and has played in the Greece (Panellinios) and Ukraine (Politekhnika-Halychyna, Kryvbas).

Koprivica is married with Vedrana Grbović. Vedrana was Miss Serbia in 2006 and represented Serbia in Miss World 2006.

Koprivica earned his bachelor's degree in international business and entrepreneurship from the Washington State University in 2010 and earned his master's degree in leadership, business administration and management from the Truman State University in 2016.
