= Železnik Hall =

Sporting venue in Serbia

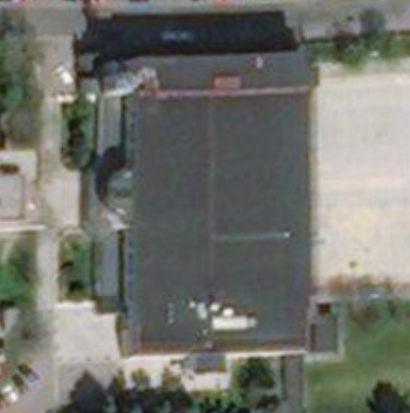
- Interactive map of Železnik Hall
- Location: Belgrade, Serbia
- Coordinates: 44°43′52.72″N 20°22′36″E
- Owner: City of Belgrade
- Capacity: 1700

Construction
- Opened: 1994

Tenants
- FMP; Crvena zvezda

Železnik Hall (Serbian: Дворана Железник, romanized: Dvorana Železnik) is a basketball arena in Belgrade, Serbia. The arena is currently used as a home arena to the KK FMP Beograd of the Basketball League of Serbia and the Adriatic League.

The basketball arena has three levels and the area of 4,500 square metres. With various associate structures it represents a modern sports and business complex. Apart from the seating capacity of 1,700, there is a hydromassage block, specialized medical diagnostic centre and a modern gym of 200 square metres. The arena has scenic illumination and loudspeakers of 6 kW. The arena got new premises, trophy hall, press hall with a capacity for 40 people and a hotel with an area of 1,000 square metres for the accommodation of basketball players.

== See also ==
- List of indoor arenas in Serbia
