= Koprivnica, Krško =

Koprivnica
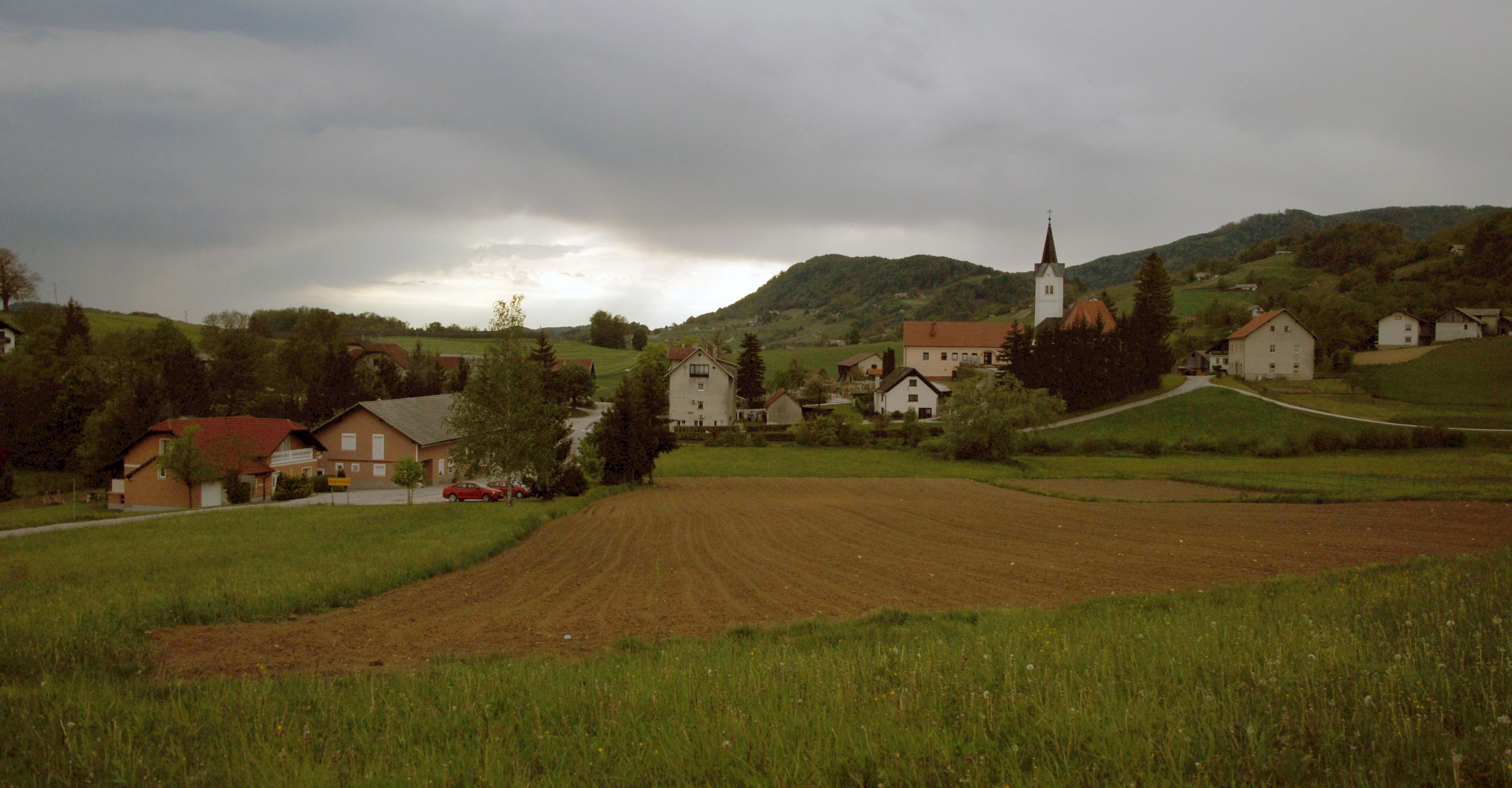
- Koprivnica (May 2016)

- Location in Slovenia
- Coordinates: 46°2′31.55″N 15°32′10.78″E
- Country: Slovenia
- Traditional region: Styria
- Statistical region: Lower Sava
- Municipality: Krško

Area
  - Total: 1.67 km^{2} (0.64 sq mi)
- Elevation: 376 m (1,234 ft)

Population (2002)
  - Total: 144
- Postal code: 8282

Koprivnica (pronounced [kɔˈpɾiːu̯nitsa]) is a settlement northeast of Senovo in the Municipality of Krško in eastern Slovenia. The area is part of the traditional region of Styria. It is now included with the rest of the municipality in the Lower Sava Statistical Region.

The parish church in the village is dedicated to the Assumption of Mary and belongs to the Roman Catholic Diocese of Celje. It was built in the early 17th century. In 1824, its nave was extended and a new belfry and two side chapels were built. The main altar dates to the mid-18th century.
