= Senovo, Krško =

Senovo
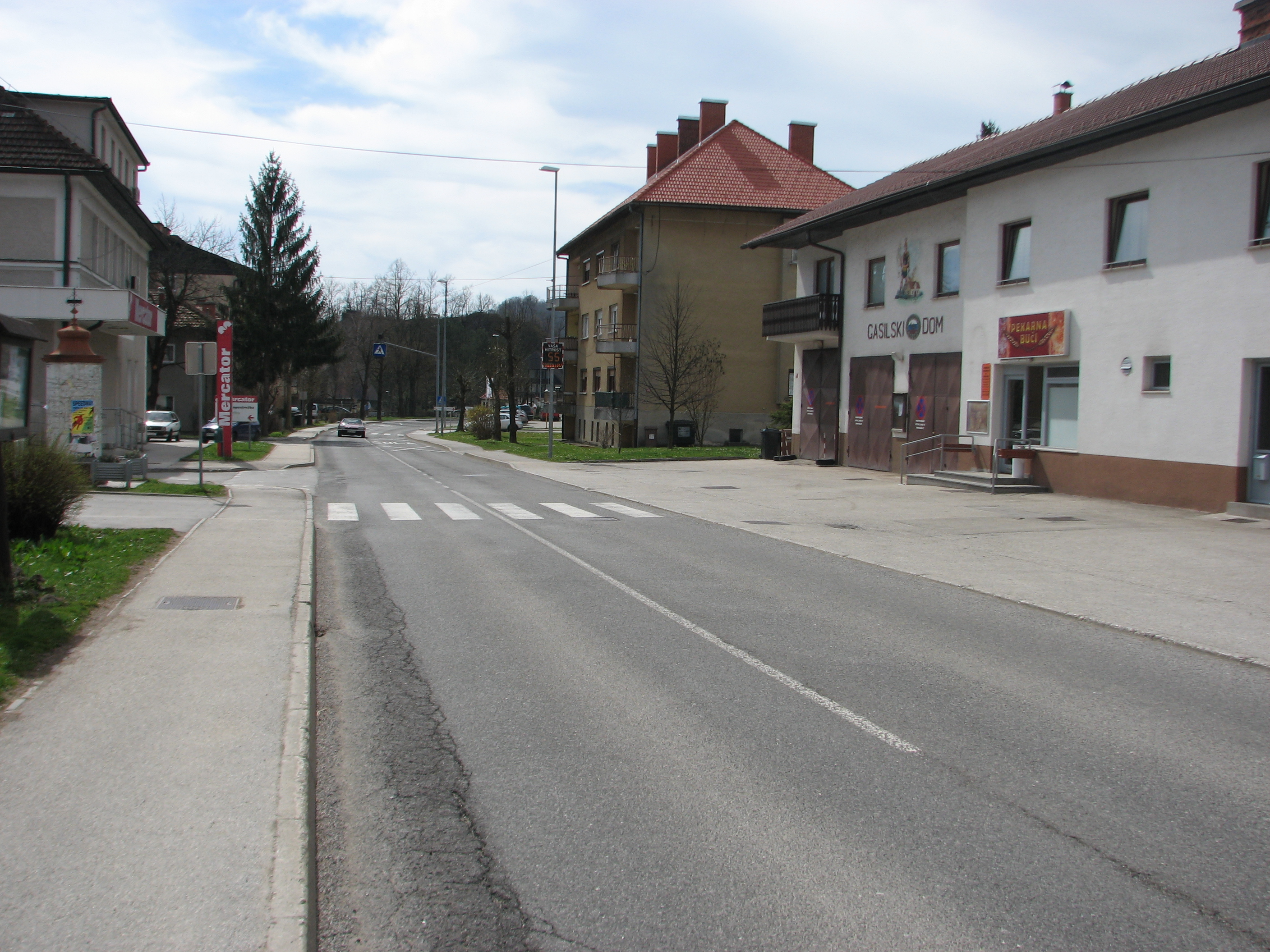

- Location in Slovenia
- Coordinates: 46°1′33.18″N 15°28′49.33″E
- Country: Slovenia
- Traditional region: Styria
- Statistical region: Lower Sava
- Municipality: Krško

Area
  - Total: 3.29 km^{2} (1.27 sq mi)
- Elevation: 240.5 m (789 ft)

Population (2002)
  - Total: 2,448

Senovo (pronounced [sɛˈnɔːʋɔ] or [sɛˈnoːʋɔ]) is a settlement in the Municipality of Krško in eastern Slovenia. It developed into a large settlement after its brown coal mine began to operate in 1839, but especially in the early 20th century. The mine closed in the second half of the 1990s. The area is part of the traditional region of Styria. It is now included with the rest of the municipality in the Lower Sava Statistical Region.

The parish church in the settlement is dedicated to Christ the Saviour and belongs to the Roman Catholic Diocese of Celje. It was built in 1975 and has a square floor plan with a slanted roof and a separate belfry.
