= Karamanolis =

Karamanolis is a surname. Notable people with the surname include:

- Andreas Karamanolis (born 2001), Cypriot footballer
- Dimitris Karamanolis (born 1998), Greek basketball player
