= Andrew Antelidze =

Georgian basketball coach (born 2000)

PAOK Thessaloniki
- Position: Assistant coach
- League: Greek Basketball League; EuroCup

Personal information
- Born: 15 August 2000 (age 26) New York, USA
- Listed height: 1.91 m (6 ft 3 in)
- Coaching career: 2020–present

Career history

Coaching
- 2020–2021: Amra Gagra (assistant)
- 2022–2025: Georgia (assistant)
- 2022–2023: Žalgiris youth teams (assistant)
- 2023–2025: Žalgiris (video coordinator)
- 2025–2026: Žalgiris (coach-scout)
- 2026–present: PAOK Thessaloniki (assistant)

Andrew David Antelidze (born 15 August 2000) is an American/Georgian professional basketball coach and former player who serves as an assistant coach for PAOK Thessaloniki under head coach Andrea Trinchieri. He previously worked in the coaching structure of Žalgiris Kaunas, progressing from the club's youth teams to the senior EuroLeague coaching staff, where he worked as a video coordinator and later as a coach-scout. Antelidze graduated from the EuroLeague Head Coaches Board (EHCB) Academy in 2021 and became a member of the EuroLeague Head Coaches Board in 2026.

== Playing career ==
Before beginning his coaching career, Antelidze played basketball as a 1.91 m (6 ft 3 in) guard in Georgia. He played youth basketball with Sokhumi, appearing for the club at under-16 and under-18 level, before progressing to senior basketball.

During the 2018–19 season, he played for Tskhum-Abkhazeti in Georgia's A-League. He subsequently appeared in the Georgian Superleague with Tskhum-Abkhazeti and Delta during the 2019–20 season.

Antelidze subsequently ended his playing career at a young age and moved into coaching and basketball analysis.

== Coaching career ==
=== Early coaching career ===
Antelidze began working as a coach in Georgia in 2020, serving as an assistant coach with Amra Gagra.

In 2021, he graduated from the EuroLeague Head Coaches Board (EHCB) Academy and also obtained the FIBA European Coaches Certificate. In September 2026, he became a member of the EuroLeague Head Coaches Board.

He later joined the coaching staff of the Georgia men's national basketball team, working with the national-team program over several seasons. His experience with the Georgian national team helped him establish connections within European basketball and contributed to his eventual move to Lithuania.

=== Žalgiris ===
In 2022, Antelidze moved to Lithuania and joined the youth coaching structure of Žalgiris Kaunas. During the 2023–24 season, he began working with the senior team after being brought into the staff during Andrea Trinchieri's tenure.

After initially working within the club's youth system, Antelidze became increasingly involved in the preparation of the first team. His responsibilities included video analysis, opponent scouting and assisting the coaching staff with tactical preparation.

In June 2024, Žalgiris formally promoted Antelidze to the senior coaching staff as a video coordinator.

In that role, he prepared video material for the coaching staff, analysed upcoming opponents and assisted with in-game analysis. Antelidze worked closely with assistant coach Massimiliano Menetti and was responsible for monitoring the offensive actions and tendencies of teams assigned to him during games.

Following Trinchieri's departure and the appointment of Tomas Masiulis as head coach, Antelidze remained with Žalgiris for the 2025–26 season. His role was expanded from video coordinator to coach-scout, with Antelidze and Andrius Ulčickas sharing scouting responsibilities within the coaching staff.

His work at Žalgiris focused particularly on video breakdown, tactical scouting, opponent preparation and the use of game data and analytics to support the coaching staff.

=== PAOK Thessaloniki ===
In June 2026, Trinchieri recruited Antelidze to join his coaching staff at PAOK Thessaloniki. The move reunited the two after their previous collaboration at Žalgiris.

Žalgiris officially announced Antelidze's departure on 23 June 2026, noting his progression from the club's youth program to the first-team staff, where he had worked in video analysis and coaching. He subsequently joined PAOK as an assistant coach ahead of the 2026–27 season.

At PAOK, Antelidze is part of Trinchieri's coaching staff and is primarily involved in scouting, video analysis and tactical preparation.

In September 2026, while serving on PAOK's coaching staff, Antelidze became a member of the EuroLeague Head Coaches Board, having previously graduated from the organisation's Coaches Academy in 2021.

== Coaching approach ==
Antelidze has specialised in scouting, video analysis and tactical preparation. During his time with Žalgiris, his work included analysing opponents' offensive systems and player tendencies, preparing video clips for coaches and players and monitoring tactical actions during games.

He has described scouting and the tactical aspects of basketball as his main areas of interest. His work has also involved the use of analytics to evaluate defensive activity, lineup performance and opponent tendencies.
