= Pavlos Giannakopoulos Tournament =

International basketball pre-season tournament

Pavlos Giannakopoulos Tournament Τουρνουά Παύλος Γιαννακόπουλος
- Status: Active
- Genre: Basketball pre-season tournament
- Frequency: Annual
- Locations: Athens, Greece; Melbourne and Sydney, Australia (2025)
- Years active: 2018–2019, 2021–present
- Inaugurated: September 2018
- Most recent: 18–19 September 2026
- Participants: Four basketball clubs
- Organiser: Panathinaikos B.C.

The Pavlos Giannakopoulos Tournament (Greek: Τουρνουά Παύλος Γιαννακόπουλος) is an international basketball pre-season tournament organised by Panathinaikos B.C. in memory of the club's former president and owner, Pavlos Giannakopoulos (1929–2018). Established in 2018, the tournament brings together professional basketball clubs from Greece and abroad, generally taking place in September before the start of the European basketball season.

From 2018 to 2023, the Athens editions took place at the OAKA Olympic Indoor Hall. The sixth edition, in 2024, was held at the historic Panathenaic Stadium, while the seventh, in 2025, took place in Melbourne and Sydney, Australia. In 2026, the tournament returned to the same Athens indoor arena, now known as Telekom Center Athens.

As of 2026, eight editions of the tournament have been held. Panathinaikos is the most successful club with five titles, followed by Olimpia Milano with two and Partizan Belgrade with one.

== Background and establishment ==
Pavlos Giannakopoulos was a Greek businessman and longtime owner and president of Panathinaikos B.C. During his involvement with the club, Panathinaikos established itself as a major force in European basketball, winning six European championships between 1996 and 2011. Giannakopoulos died on 10 June 2018, aged 88.

In July 2018, Panathinaikos announced the creation of an international basketball tournament in his memory. The inaugural edition brought together Panathinaikos, Fenerbahçe, Maccabi Tel Aviv and Khimki Moscow Region. The event was established as a recurring pre-season competition, with invited clubs participating in basketball games and commemorative activities honouring Giannakopoulos.

The first tournament was won by Panathinaikos, which defeated Fenerbahçe 85–80 in the deciding game on 28 September 2018.

== Tournament format ==
The tournament traditionally features four invited professional basketball teams. In its conventional format, the clubs compete in two semifinals, followed by a third-place game and a final. The winners of the semifinals advance to the final, while the losing teams contest third place.

The tournament is a friendly pre-season competition and its results do not count towards the standings of the EuroLeague, EuroCup, Greek Basket League or other official national and international competitions.

The 2024 and 2025 editions featured modified schedules rather than the conventional semifinal-and-final format. In 2024, two exhibition games were played at the Panathenaic Stadium. In 2025, the competition was organised across two Australian cities, with participating European and Australian clubs playing a series of exhibition games.

== History ==
The tournament was not held in 2020 because of the COVID-19 pandemic; it returned to the OAKA Olympic Indoor Hall in September 2021. The editions from 2018 through 2023 followed the four-team semifinal-and-final format, apart from the 2020 interruption.

=== 2024: Panathenaic Stadium ===
The sixth edition, held on 21 September 2024, moved from the OAKA Olympic Indoor Hall to the historic Panathenaic Stadium in Athens. The open-air stadium, which hosted the first modern Olympic Games in 1896, was temporarily configured for basketball. The event consisted of two scheduled exhibition games rather than a knockout tournament.

Panathinaikos announced attendance of approximately 42,000 spectators.

=== 2025: Tournament in Australia ===
The seventh edition was held in Australia in September 2025, the tournament's first edition outside Europe. Organised in cooperation with Australia's National Basketball League, it featured Panathinaikos and Partizan alongside the Sydney Kings and Adelaide 36ers. Games were held at John Cain Arena in Melbourne and Qudos Bank Arena in Sydney, under a modified exhibition-game format.

=== 2026: Return to Athens ===
The eighth edition returned to the same indoor arena on 18–19 September 2026, now known as Telekom Center Athens, and reinstated the semifinal-and-final format.

== Editions and results ==
=== 2018 ===
The inaugural tournament took place at the OAKA Olympic Indoor Hall in Athens on 27–28 September 2018. Panathinaikos won the competition after defeating Fenerbahçe 85–80 in the final.

Date	Round	Team 1	Score	Team 2
27 September	Semifinal	(Turkey) Fenerbahçe	94–92	(Israel) Maccabi Tel Aviv
27 September	Semifinal	(Greece) Panathinaikos	90–63	(Russia) Khimki
28 September	Third-place game	(Israel) Maccabi Tel Aviv	86–82	(Russia) Khimki
28 September	Final	(Greece) Panathinaikos	85–80	(Turkey) Fenerbahçe

=== 2019 ===
The second edition took place in Athens on 21–22 September 2019. Olimpia Milano won the tournament, defeating Maccabi Tel Aviv 78–69 in the final. Panathinaikos finished third.

Date	Round	Team 1	Score	Team 2
21 September	Semifinal	(Italy) Olimpia Milano	78–72	(Greece) Panathinaikos
21 September	Semifinal	(Israel) Maccabi Tel Aviv	85–77	(Turkey) Fenerbahçe
22 September	Third-place game	(Greece) Panathinaikos	84–74	(Turkey) Fenerbahçe
22 September	Final	(Italy) Olimpia Milano	78–69	(Israel) Maccabi Tel Aviv

=== 2020 ===
The tournament was not held in 2020 due to the COVID-19 pandemic.

=== 2021 ===
The third edition was held at the OAKA Olympic Indoor Hall on 18–19 September 2021, following the interruption in 2020. Panathinaikos claimed its second title, defeating Anadolu Efes 80–74 in the final.

Date	Round	Team 1	Score	Team 2
18 September	Semifinal	(Turkey) Anadolu Efes	88–69	(Germany) Ratiopharm Ulm
18 September	Semifinal	(Greece) Panathinaikos	89–85	(Serbia) Partizan
19 September	Third-place game	(Germany) Ratiopharm Ulm	94–84	(Serbia) Partizan
19 September	Final	(Greece) Panathinaikos	80–74	(Turkey) Anadolu Efes

=== 2022 ===
The fourth edition took place on 23–24 September 2022. Olimpia Milano claimed its second tournament title after defeating Panathinaikos 77–64 in the final.

Date	Round	Team 1	Score	Team 2
23 September	Semifinal	(Italy) Olimpia Milano	80–71	(Israel) Maccabi Tel Aviv
23 September	Semifinal	(Greece) Panathinaikos	86–71	(Turkey) Anadolu Efes
24 September	Third-place game	(Turkey) Anadolu Efes	87–81	(Israel) Maccabi Tel Aviv
24 September	Final	(Italy) Olimpia Milano	77–64	(Greece) Panathinaikos

=== 2023 ===
The fifth edition took place on 23–24 September 2023. Panathinaikos defeated Anadolu Efes 70–69 in the final, claiming its third tournament title. Bayern Munich finished third after defeating Partizan 99–95.

Date	Round	Team 1	Score	Team 2
23 September	Semifinal	(Turkey) Anadolu Efes	81–79	(Serbia) Partizan
23 September	Semifinal	(Greece) Panathinaikos	80–73	(Germany) Bayern Munich
24 September	Third-place game	(Germany) Bayern Munich	99–95	(Serbia) Partizan
24 September	Final	(Greece) Panathinaikos	70–69	(Turkey) Anadolu Efes

=== 2024 ===
The sixth edition was held at the Panathenaic Stadium in Athens on 21 September 2024. Unlike previous editions, the event consisted of two scheduled exhibition games rather than a conventional knockout tournament. Anadolu Efes defeated Maccabi Tel Aviv in the opening game, while Partizan defeated Panathinaikos in the concluding game.

Date	Round	Team 1	Score	Team 2
21 September	Exhibition game	(Turkey) Anadolu Efes	89–66	(Israel) Maccabi Tel Aviv
21 September	Exhibition game	(Serbia) Partizan	75–64	(Greece) Panathinaikos

=== 2025 ===
The seventh edition was held in Australia, with games taking place in Melbourne and Sydney on 18 and 21 September 2025. The tournament featured a modified format consisting of three exhibition games rather than a conventional semifinal-and-final system. Panathinaikos completed the event with victories over Partizan and Adelaide 36ers.

Date	Round	Team 1	Score	Team 2
18 September	Exhibition game	(Greece) Panathinaikos	91–82	(Serbia) Partizan
21 September	Exhibition game	(Serbia) Partizan	93–90	(Australia) Sydney Kings
21 September	Exhibition game	(Greece) Panathinaikos	106–89	(Australia) Adelaide 36ers

=== 2026 ===
The eighth edition was held at Telekom Center Athens on 18–19 September 2026. Alongside the host club, the participating teams were Partizan Belgrade, JL Bourg and PAOK Thessaloniki.

PAOK became the first Greek club other than Panathinaikos to participate in the tournament. In its debut appearance, PAOK defeated Partizan 100–99 in the semifinals following a buzzer-beating three-pointer by Marcus Foster. The team subsequently finished as runner-up after losing 87–81 to Panathinaikos in the final.

Date	Round	Team 1	Score	Team 2
18 September	Semifinal	(Greece) PAOK	100–99	(Serbia) Partizan
18 September	Semifinal	(Greece) Panathinaikos	90–69	(France) JL Bourg
19 September	Third-place game	(Serbia) Partizan	101–77	(France) JL Bourg
19 September	Final	(Greece) Panathinaikos	87–81	(Greece) PAOK

== Titles by club ==
Club	Country	Titles	Winning years
Panathinaikos	Greece	5	2018, 2021, 2023, 2025, 2026
Olimpia Milano	Italy	2	2019, 2022
Partizan	Serbia	1	2024

== Venues ==
Venue	City	Country	Editions
OAKA Olympic Indoor Hall / Telekom Center Athens	Athens	Greece	2018, 2019, 2021, 2022, 2023, 2026
Panathenaic Stadium	Athens	Greece	2024
John Cain Arena	Melbourne	Australia	2025
Qudos Bank Arena	Sydney	Australia	2025

Note: The OAKA Olympic Indoor Hall and Telekom Center Athens are the same venue; the name changed in August 2025.

== See also ==
- Pavlos Giannakopoulos
- Panathinaikos B.C.
- Greek Basket League
- EuroLeague
