= Giorgos Fillios =

Greek basketball player

No. 25 – PAOK Thessaloniki
- Position: Point guard / shooting guard
- League: Greek Basketball League; EuroCup

Personal information
- Born: February 10, 2002 (age 24) Thessaloniki, Greece
- Listed height: 6 ft 5 in (1.96 m)
- Listed weight: 207 lb (94 kg)

Career information
- Playing career: 2018–present

Career history
- 2018–2022: Iraklis Thessaloniki
- 2022–2024: Aris Thessaloniki
- 2024: AEK Athens
- 2024–2025: Aris Thessaloniki
- 2025–present: PAOK Thessaloniki

Giorgos Fillios (Greek: Γιώργος Φίλλιος, born February 10, 2002) is a Greek professional basketball player for PAOK Thessaloniki of the Greek Basketball League (GBL) and EuroCup. He plays at the point guard and shooting guard positions.

== Professional career ==
Fillios began his pro career in the Greek A2 Basket League with Iraklis Thessaloniki, in the 2018–19 season. The next year, he debuted in the Greek Basket League in a game against Ionikos Nikaias.

On July 11, 2023, Fillios joined Aris Thessaloniki.

On August 14, 2024, Fillios moved to AEK Athens. On December 3 of the same year, he was released from AEK and returned to Aris. On July 23, 2025, Fillios was waived by Aris. Three days later, he signed with local rivals PAOK.
