= PAOK BC =

Basketball club in Thessaloniki, Greece

PAOK Thessaloniki
- Nickname: Double-Headed Eagle of the North
- Leagues: Greek Basketball League; EuroCup
- Founded: 1928; 98 years ago
- History: PAOK BC (1928–present)
- Arena: PAOK Sports Arena
- Capacity: 8,500
- Location: Thessaloniki, Greece
- Team colors: Black, white
- Main sponsor: Stoiximan
- President: Ioannis Petmezas
- General manager: Georgios Tsiaras
- Team manager: Michalis Giannakidis
- Head coach: Andrea Trinchieri
- Team captain: Nikos Persidis
- Ownership: Aristotelis Mistakidis
- Championships: 1 Saporta Cup; 1 Korać Cup; 2 Greek Championships; 3 Greek Cups
- Retired numbers: 1 (7)
- Website: paokbc.gr
Home	Away

PAOK BC (Greek: ΚΑΕ ΠΑΟΚ, Πανθεσσαλονίκειος Αθλητικός Όμιλος Κωνσταντινοπολιτών, Panthessaloníkios Athlitikós Ómilos Konstantinopolitón, "Pan-Thessalonikian Athletic Club of Constantinopolitans"), commonly known as PAOK, or as PAOK Thessaloniki in European competitions, is the professional basketball department of the major Greek multi-sports club A.C. PAOK, which was founded in 1926, and is based in Thessaloniki. The club's basketball section was founded in 1928. The club's home arena is the PAOK Sports Arena, which is an indoor arena with a seating capacity of 8,500 people.

Over the years, the PAOK basketball club has established itself with a firm reputation in Greek professional basketball, especially due to its successes in European-wide competitions. In the past, the club has won Greece's top-tier level Greek Basket League twice, in 1959 and 1992. The club has also won the top national Greek Cup competition three times, in 1984, 1995, and 1999.

In Pan-European competitions, PAOK has also won two European Cup titles. They won the now defunct European-wide secondary level competition, the FIBA Saporta Cup, in the 1990–91 season. They also won the now defunct European-wide third level competition, the FIBA Korać Cup, in the 1993–94 season. In addition, PAOK was the FIBA Saporta Cup Finals' runner-up in both the 1991–92 and 1995–96 seasons. On the European-wide top-tier level, PAOK competed in the EuroLeague's concluding championship tournament, the Final Four, at the 1993 Athens EuroLeague Final Four, where they finished in third place.

== History ==
=== 1928–1980 ===
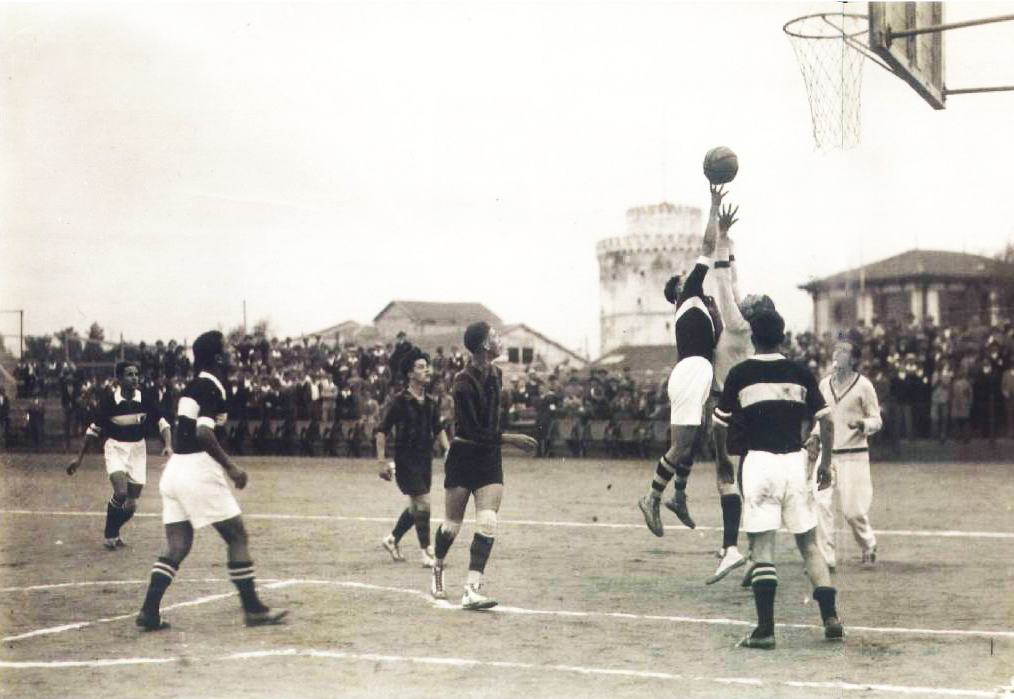
PAOK vs. HANTH (YMCA) during the 1920s

The men's basketball section of the multi-sports club PAOK AC was created in 1928, when Alekos Alexiadis, a young member of the administration council of PAOK AC (founded in 1926), took the initiative to create a men's basketball team. He "gave birth" to the basketball department again, after World War II. After the war, Alekos Alexiadis began to organize a basketball team from the children that played at the only basketball court in Thessaloniki. The first honor for PAOK's basketball section was the win of the 1958–59 Greek League championship. The team was crowned the Champions of Greece, with the following players; Dapontes, Kyriakou, Oikonomou, Paschalis, Stalios, Kokkos, Theoridis, Angelidis, Stergiou, Konstantinidis, and player-coach Irakleios Klagas. The next year, PAOK competed for the first time in a European-wide competition and was eliminated in the first round of the European Champions Cup by the Romanian champions CCA București. Three years later, the Greek League was reconstructed into a Nation-wide League, but PAOK was placed in the Second National Division, where they won an immediate league promotion to the first division the next year. The worst season of the club to date was in 1976–77, when PAOK avoided relegation, with a 66–53 play-out win over Dimokritos.

=== 1981–1990 ===
PAOK met Panathinaikos in its first Greek Cup Final, in 1982. The Athenians managed to scrape through to a two-point victory, despite the game being played in Alexandreio Melathron, which was PAOK's home arena at that time. In the following 1982–83 season, the team finished in second place behind Aris.

The success of both Aris and PAOK fuelled the ongoing rivalry between the clubs, which had long been established in football. In 1984, the two teams reached the Greek Cup Final. PAOK's head coach, Faidon Matthaiou, ordered the players to shave their heads in an attempt to strengthen the team's morale. PAOK won the Greek Cup 74–70, in what became known as the "final of the shaven heads".

The summer of 1984 also marked an important administrative turning point for the club, as Nikos Vezyrtzis took over the leadership of PAOK's basketball department. During his administration, the club strengthened its roster and gradually developed from a domestic contender into one of the leading teams in Greek and European basketball.

The then 22-year-old Bane Prelević, debuted with the club in the 1988–89 season. He became the definitive leader of PAOK, and a fan favorite. He was often compared to the great Nikos Galis, who was at the time the captain of Aris. Prelević was often quoted for his loyalty to the team. He had a number of injuries and medical emergencies because of weak legs, but he would constantly choose to take heavy dosages of painkillers, rather than missing out on important games. During the 1980s decade, PAOK was second in the Greek League only to Aris.

=== 1991–2000 ===
PAOK won the now defunct European second-tier level FIBA European Cup Winners' Cup's (Saporta Cup's) 1990–91 season championship, when PAOK defeated the Spanish ACB League club CAI Zaragoza in Geneva, by a score of 76–72, on March 26, 1991.

In the following 1991–92 season, PAOK once again reached the final of the same competition (then called the FIBA European Cup), but they lost to the Spanish League club Real Madrid Asegurator, by a score of 65–63. The game was heading to overtime, as the two teams were equal at 63 points, when Panagiotis Fasoulas lost the ball to Rickey Brown in the last 2 seconds of the game, and Real Madrid scored an unexpected basket. The same year, PAOK won the Greek League championship, by beating Aris in the league's final four mini stage, and then Olympiacos in the playoff's finals.

In the 1992–93 season, PAOK had a starting five unit of Jon Korfas, Bane Prelević, Cliff Levingston, Ken Barlow and Panagiotis Fasoulas, and was led by head coach Dušan Ivković. In that season, the club competed in Europe's premier club basketball competition, the FIBA European League (now called EuroLeague), which marked the club's first appearance in the top-tier level European league. PAOK reached the 1993 Athens Final Four. PAOK lost in the semifinal game to the then defending Italian League champions Benetton Treviso, which was led by the Croatian star Toni Kukoč, by a score of 79–77. Two days later, in the third-place game, PAOK defeated Spain's Real Madrid Teka, which was led by the Lithuanian star Arvydas Sabonis and American Rickey Brown.

The 1993 Final Four marked the end of Vezyrtzis' first period at the head of PAOK's basketball department. During his tenure, PAOK had established itself among the leading clubs in European basketball, highlighted by the 1991 European Cup Winners' Cup and the 1992 Greek championship. Following the 1992–93 season, Vezyrtzis stepped down and handed control of the basketball department to Apostolos Oikonomidis.

In the 1993–94 season, PAOK returned to European success, by winning the European third-tier level FIBA Korać Cup competition, in a two-legged final against the Italian League club Stefanel Trieste. PAOK won both at home and away, by 9 points. The following year, PAOK won the Greek Cup title, in a 19-point victory against Chipita Panionios, by a score of 72–53. In the 1995–96 season, PAOK once again reached the final of the FIBA European Cup (Saporta Cup), but they lost to the Spanish club Taugrés, by a score of 88–81. Three years later in 1999, PAOK again won the Greek Cup title, by defeating AEK Athens, by a score of 71–54.

The new home of PAOK, the PAOK Sports Arena, able to hold 8,500 fans, hosted its first official PAOK game on 17 May 2000, when the club faced Panathinaikos in the second game of the Greek League Finals. The arena's construction had been a long-standing project in which Vezyrtzis played a key role, strongly promoting the creation of a permanent basketball home for PAOK on land donated by the Dedeoglou family. The move marked the end of a long period in which the club had shared the home court of Alexandreio Melathron with Aris.

Bane Prelević returned to PAOK, after having quick spells at Kinder Bologna and AEK Athens, and then quit playing basketball at the end of the 1999–00 season. He later returned to PAOK in the 2001–02 season, as an assistant coach.

During the 1990s decade, PAOK was one of the top teams in the Greek League. They won the Greek League championship in 1992, and also played in the league's finals in 1994, 1998, and 2000. In addition to that, PAOK also made it to the league's semifinals each year, and they finished in 3rd place in the Greek league 1993, 1997, and 1999.

=== 2001–2010 ===
PAOK played in EuroLeague Basketball's inaugural 2000–01 season, where they made it to the Round of 16, and lost to the Slovenian League club Union Olimpija. However, a difficult financial situation led the previous season's Greek League finalists to struggle in the Greek League, where they finished in 8th place in the 2000–01 Greek League season. In the 2001–02 season, PAOK again finished in 8th place in the Greek League. Prelević became the team's head coach for the 2002–03 season, and he led them to a short winning streak during the year. PAOK ended up in 7th place in the Greek League in the 2002–03 season. PAOK also competed in FIBA-organized Pan-European club competitions at that time. They competed in the European third-level 2001–02 FIBA Korać Cup, and in the European third-level 2002–03 FIBA Europe Champions Cup (EuroChallenge).

PAOK finished in 6th place in the 2003–04 Greek League season, with a squad full of talented young players, like Panos Vasilopoulos, Kostas Vasileiadis and Loukas Mavrokefalidis. During the season, PAOK withdrew from FIBA-run competitions, and in the 2004–05 season, the team made its debut in the European-wide secondary level ULEB Cup (EuroCup) competition. PAOK made it to the ULEB Cup's quarterfinals that season, where they lost to the Lithuanian League club Lietuvos Rytas. In the Greek League, PAOK finished in 6th place. In the 2005–06 season, PAOK finished in 6th place in the Greek League.

During a 2006–07 Greek League season game, PAOK and Aris put on a spectacular show, that PAOK ended up winning, after two overtime periods. The team finished that season's Greek League in 6th place, after losing to Olympiacos in the league's playoffs. PAOK also played in the ULEB Cup (EuroCup) in the 2006–07 season. They made it to the league's Top 16 Round that season, where they lost to the Italian League club Montepaschi Siena.

The 2007–08 Greek League season was one of the worst in PAOK's history, with PAOK finishing in a disastrous 12th place in the league. However, during that Greek League season, PAOK picked up a great victory against Olympiacos. In that same 2007–08 season, PAOK also had a disappointing finish in the now defunct European-wide third- level competition, the FIBA EuroCup (EuroChallenge). Because of that, PAOK's management decided for the club to take a break from Pan-European leagues, and to instead focus mainly on the Greek League. So the club did not compete in any European-wide leagues in the following 2008–09 and 2009–10 seasons.

PAOK finished in 7th place in the 2008–09 Greek League season. Prior to the start of the 2009–10 season, PAOK hired Soulis Markopoulos to be the team's new head coach. PAOK finished in 5th place in the 2009–10 Greek League season.

=== 2010–2020 ===
PAOK finished 3rd place in the Greek League in the 2010–11 season. That success allowed PAOK to play in the EuroLeague's qualifying tournament in the 2011–12 season. However, in the 2011–12 season, PAOK finished in a disappointing 8th place in the Greek League, and thus missed out on European-wide competition for the 2012–13 season. In the 2012–13 season, PAOK finished in 5th place in the Greek League, and was then able to return to European competition for the following season. In the next season, they competed in the 2nd-tier level EuroCup. In the Greek League, PAOK finished in 3rd place, in both the 2013–14 and 2014–15 seasons. In the 2015–16 season, PAOK finished in 5th place in the Greek League. After the 2015–17 FIBA–Euroleague Basketball controversy, PAOK decided to return to FIBA organized competitions, and chose to play in the FIBA Champions League, rather than in the EuroCup. After finishing in 5th place in the Greek League in the 2016–17 season, the club replaced head coach Soulis Markopoulos with Ilias Papatheodorou. In the 2017–18 season, PAOK finished in 3rd place in the Greek League. The 2019–20 season was the worst on PAOK history because PAOK finished in the last place of Greek basketball league; but due to COVID-19 pandemic, it wasn't relegated.

=== 2020–2025 ===
In July 2020, businessman Thanasis Chatzopoulos joined the court-appointed administration of PAOK B.C., together with Vasilios Trilyrakis, at a time when the club was facing serious financial difficulties. Aristeidis Karakousis initially remained president and chief executive officer. At the new administration's first press conference in September 2020, Chatzopoulos identified the club's immediate survival and the gradual repayment of its accumulated debts as the main priorities.

On 1 July 2021, Chatzopoulos formally became president and chief executive officer of PAOK B.C. Financial restructuring remained the defining priority of his administration, with a significant part of the club's available income being directed towards old obligations and debt settlements rather than the playing budget.

By July 2024, Chatzopoulos reported that the club's total liabilities had fallen to €4.07 million, a figure which included obligations to Ivan Savvidis that had been declared non-demandable. Excluding those obligations, he estimated the remaining debt at approximately €2.12 million, while the amount owed to the Greek state had been reduced to €825,000. In February 2025, the club reported that its financial years had returned to profitability and that its liabilities had been significantly reduced. By May 2025, Chatzopoulos stated that PAOK was fully up to date with its obligations for the season, while outstanding liabilities to the state had fallen below €500,000.

In April 2024, PAOK attracted international attention by signing former NBA player Kevin Porter Jr. for the remainder of the 2023–24 season.

The club's competitive progress culminated during the 2024–25 FIBA Europe Cup, when PAOK reached its first European final since 1996. Coached by Massimo Cancellieri, the team advanced through the knockout rounds before finishing as runners-up to Bilbao Basket.

Fan support also increased during the final years of the administration. In July 2025, the club announced the sale of 4,492 season tickets for the 2025–26 campaign, establishing a new club record at the time.

In September 2025, representatives of businessman Aristotelis Mistakidis formally expressed interest in acquiring a controlling stake in PAOK B.C. Chatzopoulos' administration entered negotiations and provided the financial information required for due diligence. By 22 October, the financial, tax and legal reviews had been completed and the two sides had reached an agreement in principle for the change of ownership.

The ownership transfer was completed on 27 November 2025, bringing Chatzopoulos' five-and-a-half-year period in the club's administration to an end. In his farewell press conference, he cited the reduction of the club's debts, the return of supporters to the arena, the 2025 European final and the arrival of a financially strong investor among the main outcomes of his tenure.

=== Mistakidis era (2025–present) ===
==== 2025–26 season ====
On 27 November 2025, businessman Aristotelis Mistakidis, through Alpha Sports Group Single Member S.A., acquired a controlling 60.81% stake in PAOK B.C., marking a change in the club's ownership.

Several figures with long-standing links to PAOK basketball returned to senior positions during the first months of the new ownership. On 3 December, former long-time club president Nikos Vezyrtzis was appointed president of a temporary court-appointed administration. Two days later, former PAOK player Nikos Boudouris returned to the club as General Manager, with Vangelis Margaritis appointed Assistant General Manager and Michalis Giannakidis continuing as Team Manager.

On 9 December, the club announced plans for a €12 million share-capital increase to be fully covered by Mistakidis' Alpha Sports Group. On 17 December, a new elected board was formed, with Vezyrtzis as president, former PAOK president Vasilios Oikonomidis as vice-president and Ioannis Petmezas as chief executive officer.

The new ownership strengthened the roster during the 2025–26 season, with the additions including former NBA guard Patrick Beverley, who joined the club in December 2025.

In March 2026, PAOK signed Andrea Trinchieri to a three-year contract beginning with the 2026–27 season. During the remainder of the 2025–26 season, he served in an advisory role and participated in the strategic planning and organisation of the basketball department. PAOK subsequently reached the 2025–26 FIBA Europe Cup Final, becoming a finalist for the second consecutive season, but again finished as runners-up to Bilbao Basket.

In May 2026, PAOK announced the development of a new privately operated basketball training centre on an 8,000-square-metre site in Pylaia, Thessaloniki. Construction work began during 2026, with the completion of the complex targeted for autumn 2026.

On 11 May 2026, PAOK announced the end of its cooperation with Vezyrtzis, Oikonomidis and Boudouris. The board was subsequently reorganised, with Petmezas assuming the combined roles of president and chief executive officer.

==== 2026–27 season ====
For the 2026–27 season, PAOK moved from FIBA-organised club competitions to the BKT EuroCup, returning to a competition organised by Euroleague Basketball after a ten-year absence. The club signed a three-year participation agreement with an option for a further two years, while maintaining its longer-term objective of entering the EuroLeague.

Andrea Trinchieri formally assumed his role as head coach at the beginning of the 2026–27 season, following his appointment earlier in 2026. During the summer of 2026, the club carried out an extensive reconstruction of its roster under Trinchieri. Among its signings were EuroLeague all-time assists leader Nick Calathes and former NBA and EuroLeague forward Cedi Osman.

The previous season-ticket record was surpassed in July 2026, when PAOK sold out all 6,000 season tickets made available for the 2026–27 campaign. The total included an additional allocation of 1,000 tickets released after the initial 5,000 had been exhausted.

On 3 August 2026, PAOK announced a long-term strategic partnership with the DEKA basketball academy, integrating its men's team as the club's main development team and establishing a pathway for young players to progress towards the senior squad.

The club subsequently expanded its affiliated academy network through partnerships with G.E. Agriniou and Keravnos Oraiokastrou in September 2026, followed in October by Dioskouri Kozanis, G.S. Thivas, Edessaikos, A.O.K. Veria, Megas Alexandros Leptokaryas and Tavroi Kalamarias, and in November by Basket Dramas Academy, A.S. Proteas Thessalonikis and K.A.O.X. (Chalkidiki).

In September 2026, PAOK reached the final of the Stoiximan Super Cup after defeating Panathinaikos AKTOR 84–82 in the semifinal, with Cedi Osman scoring the game-winning three-pointer at the buzzer. In the final, PAOK recovered from a 21-point deficit and reduced the margin to two points in the closing stages before losing 101–96 to Olympiacos, finishing as runners-up.

== Facilities ==
=== Home courts ===
PAOK played its home games for many years at the 5,183 seat Alexandreio Melathron (Nick Galis Hall). In 2000, the club moved to the 8,500 seat PAOK Sports Arena.

PAOK B.C. Arenas image gallery
Alexandreio Melathron
(1966–2000)

PAOK Sports Arena
(2000–present)

=== New training centre ===
In May 2026, PAOK announced the development of a private basketball training centre on an 8,000-square-metre site in Pylaia, Thessaloniki. The project was scheduled for completion in autumn 2026.

The facilities are planned to include:

- Two fully equipped indoor basketball courts
- Individual and team training areas
- A strength and rehabilitation gym
- Locker rooms for athletes and coaching staff
- A game analysis and educational activities room
- Medical and physiotherapy facilities
- Outdoor green areas and parking spaces

== Roster ==
Note: Flags indicate national team eligibility at FIBA-sanctioned events. Players may hold other non-FIBA nationalities not displayed.

PAOK roster
Players
Coaches

Pos.	No.	Nat.	Name	Ht.	Wt.	Age
PF	0	(United States)	Gray, RaiQuan	2.01 m (6 ft 7 in)	122 kg (269 lb)	27 – 7 July 1999
G	1	(Greece)	Mitrou-Long, Naz	1.93 m (6 ft 4 in)	94 kg (207 lb)	33 – 3 August 1993
G	5	(Albania)	Tyree, Breein	1.88 m (6 ft 2 in)	88 kg (194 lb)	28 – 13 January 1998
SF	6	(Turkey)	Osman, Cedi (injured)	2.07 m (6 ft 9 in)	104 kg (229 lb)	31 – 8 April 1995
F/C	8	(Canada)	Alexander, Kyle	2.08 m (6 ft 10 in)	97 kg (214 lb)	30 – 21 October 1996
PF	9	(Greece)	Chougkaz, Nikos	2.08 m (6 ft 10 in)	100 kg (220 lb)	26 – 4 October 2000
PG	12	(United States)	Hudgins, Trevor	1.80 m (5 ft 11 in)	82 kg (181 lb)	27 – 23 March 1999
C	14	(Greece)	Kaklamanakis, Dimitris	2.06 m (6 ft 9 in)	95 kg (209 lb)	32 – 25 January 1994
SG	17	(United States)	Foster, Marcus	1.93 m (6 ft 4 in)	93 kg (205 lb)	31 – 3 June 1995
F	18	(Greece)	Persidis, Nikos (C)	2.01 m (6 ft 7 in)	98 kg (216 lb)	31 – 8 September 1995
C	20	(Lithuania)	Motiejūnas, Donatas	2.13 m (7 ft 0 in)	118 kg (260 lb)	36 – 20 September 1990
G	25	(Greece)	Fillios, Giorgos	1.96 m (6 ft 5 in)	94 kg (207 lb)	24 – 10 February 2002
F/C	26	(United States)	Moore, Ben	2.03 m (6 ft 8 in)	100 kg (220 lb)	31 – 13 May 1995
PG	33	(Greece)	Calathes, Nick	1.98 m (6 ft 6 in)	97 kg (214 lb)	37 – 7 February 1989
PG	77	(Greece)	Bazinas, Nasos	1.94 m (6 ft 4 in)	89 kg (196 lb)	23 – 18 October 2003

Head coach

- (Italy) Andrea Trinchieri

Assistant coach(es)

- (Italy) Massimiliano Menetti
- (Greece) Georgios Dedas
- (Greece) Charalampos Karaiskos
- (Georgia (country)) Andrew Antelidze
- (Greece) Stavros Chatzipetrou
- (Greece) Vangelis Margaritis

Strength & conditioning coach(es)

- (Serbia) Luka Nastov
- (Greece) Alexis Papachristou

Team manager

- (Greece) Michalis Giannakidis

Legend

- (C) Team captain
- Injured

- Roster
Updated: 17 November 2026

=== Depth chart ===
Pos.	Starting 5	Bench 1	Bench 2	Bench 3	Inactive
C	Kyle Alexander	Ben Moore	Donatas Motiejūnas	Dimitris Kaklamanakis
PF	RaiQuan Gray	Nikos Chougkaz
SF	Marcus Foster	Nikos Persidis			Cedi Osman (injured)
SG	Breein Tyree	Naz Mitrou-Long
PG	Nick Calathes	Trevor Hudgins	Nasos Bazinas	Giorgos Fillios

Notes: Under GBL regulations, each team may register up to eight foreign players, while a maximum of six foreign players may participate in each game. Players holding Greek citizenship are counted as Greek players for domestic roster purposes, irrespective of whether they also hold another nationality or represent another national team.

=== Other players under contract ===
PAOK Thessaloniki – Other players under contract
Nat.	Player	Pos.	Height	Born	Team	Status
(Greece)	Giorgos Charalampidis	PG	1.87 m	14 Jan 2011	(Greece) DEKA	Development team (2026–27)
(Greece)	Konstantinos Iatridis	PF / C	2.07 m	14 Oct 2001	(Greece) Mykonos Betsson	Loan (2026–27)
(Greece)	Manolis Manis	SG	1.90 m	30 Sep 2009	(Greece) DEKA	Development team (2026–27)
(Greece)	Christos Manthopoulos	PF	2.03 m	29 Jul 2006	(Greece) Machites Pefkon	Dual registration (2026–27)
(Greece)	Giannis Spanos	PF	2.02 m	26 Jan 2010	(Greece) DEKA	Development team (2026–27)
(United States)	Leland Walker	PG	1.85 m	12 Apr 2003	(Romania) U-BT Cluj-Napoca	Loan (2026–27)

=== Retired numbers ===
PAOK Thessaloniki retired numbers
No.	Nat.	Player	Position	Tenure	Date retired
7	(Serbia)	Branislav Prelević	SG	1988–1996, 1999–2000	1 April 2023

== Squad changes for the 2026–27 season ==
=== In ===
Date	Pos.	Player	From
14 May 2026	PG	(Greece) Nasos Bazinas	(Greece) Promitheas Patras
4 June 2026	SG	(United States) Marcus Foster	(Japan) Alvark Tokyo
5 June 2026	G	(Greece) Naz Mitrou-Long	(Italy) Napoli Basket
8 June 2026	PG	(United States) Trevor Hudgins	(France) Le Mans
11 June 2026	PF	(United States) RaiQuan Gray	(Greece) AEK Athens
17 June 2026	PG	(Greece) Nick Calathes	(Serbia) Partizan
19 June 2026	C	(Canada) Kyle Alexander	(Turkey) Türk Telekom
24 June 2026	C	(Greece) Dimitris Kaklamanakis	(Greece) Peristeri
20 July 2026	SF	(Turkey) Cedi Osman	(Greece) Panathinaikos
5 August 2026	PF	(Greece) Giannis Spanos	(Greece) DEKA
5 August 2026	PG	(Greece) Giorgos Charalampidis	(Greece) Greek Basketball Academy (GBA)
4 October 2026	C	(Lithuania) Donatas Motiejūnas	(Serbia) Crvena zvezda
28 October 2026	PG	(United States) Leland Walker	(Finland) Salon Vilpas

=== Out ===
Date	Pos.	Player	To
3 June 2026	PF	(United States) Cleveland Melvin	(Greece) Iraklis
20 June 2026	PG	(Greece) Antonis Koniaris	(Greece) Maroussi
3 July 2026	PF	(Greece) Diamantis Slaftsakis	(Greece) Iraklis
1 August 2026	SF	(United States) Timmy Allen	(Spain) Manresa
2 August 2026	SG	(Lithuania) Tomas Dimša	(Spain) Leyma Coruña
14 August 2026	PG	(United States) Patrick Beverley	(France) Boulazac Basket Dordogne
14 August 2026	SG	(Greece) Thodoris Zaras	Retired (PAOK Head of Development Program)
16 September 2026	PF	(Greece) Christos Manthopoulos	(Greece) Machites Pefkon (dual registration)
19 September 2026	PF	(Greece) Konstantinos Iatridis	(Greece) Mykonos Betsson (loan)
28 October 2026	PG	(United States) Leland Walker	(Romania) U-BT Cluj-Napoca (loan)
17 November 2026	C	(Nigeria) Clifford Omoruyi	(France) SIG Strasbourg

== Honours ==
=== Domestic competitions ===
- Greek League

Winners (2): 1958–59, 1991–92
Runners-up (9): 1959–60, 1984–85, 1987–88, 1988–89, 1989–90, 1990–91, 1993–94, 1997–98, 1999–00

- Greek Cup

Winners (3): 1983–84, 1994–95, 1998–99
Runners-up (5): 1981–82, 1988–89, 1989–90, 1990–91, 2018–19

- Greek Super Cup

Runners-up (1): 2026

=== European competitions ===
- EuroLeague

3rd place (1): 1992–93
Final Four (1): 1993

- FIBA Saporta Cup (defunct)

Winners (1): 1990–91
Runners-up (2): 1991–92, 1995–96
Semifinalists (1): 1989–90

- FIBA Korać Cup (defunct)

Winners (1): 1993–94

- FIBA Europe Cup

Runners-up (2): 2024–25, 2025–26

=== Friendly competitions ===
- Mavroskoufia Basketball Tournament

Winners (6): 2008, 2010, 2017, 2018, 2019 (shared), 2023

- Trophée Legrand Limoges

Winners (1): 1991

- Memorial Piera Pajetta

Winners (1): 2026

- Pavlos Giannakopoulos Tournament

Runners-up (1): 2026

== Individual honours ==
FIBA Hall of Fame

- Dušan Ivković
- Panagiotis Fasoulas
- Peja Stojaković

Greek Basketball League Hall of Fame

- Panagiotis Fasoulas
- Bane Prelević
- Peja Stojaković
- Walter Berry
- Jon Korfas
- Soulis Markopoulos

50 Greatest EuroLeague Contributors

- Dušan Ivković

Greek League MVP

- Peja Stojaković (1997–98)

Greek League Finals MVP

- Panagiotis Fasoulas (1991–92)

Greek League Best Five

- Rawle Marshall (2010–11)
- D. J. Cooper (2013–14)
- Breein Tyree (2025–26)

Greek League Most Improved Player

- Loukas Mavrokefalidis (2005–06)
- Georgios Bogris (2013–14)

Greek League Best Young Player

- Antonis Koniaris (2016–17, 2017–18)

Greek League Most Spectacular Player

- Nate Renfro (2022–23)

Greek League PIR Leader

- Loukas Mavrokefalidis (2005–06)
- Ben Moore (2025–26)

Greek League Top Scorer

- Rawle Marshall (2010–11)

Greek League Top Rebounder

- Panagiotis Fasoulas (1986–87)
- Keith Clanton (2016–17)
- Ben Moore (2025–26)

Greek League Blocks Leader

- Panagiotis Fasoulas (1988–89, 1990–91, 1991–92)
- Keith Clanton (2016–17)
- Nate Renfro (2022–23)

Greek League Assist Leader

- Jon Korfas (1989–90)
- Frankie King (1998–99)
- Damir Mulaomerović (2003–04, 2004–05)
- D. J. Cooper (2013–14)

Greek League Coach of the Year

- Soulis Markopoulos (2013–14)
- Massimo Cancellieri (2024–25)

Greek Cup MVP

- Bane Prelević (1994–95)
- Walter Berry (1998–99)

== International record ==
Season	Achievement	Notes
EuroLeague
1992–93	Final Four	3rd place in Athens, lost to Benetton Treviso 77–79 in the semi-final, and defeated Real Madrid Teka 76–70 in the third-place game
FIBA Saporta Cup
1984–85	Quarter-finals	4th place in a group with Žalgiris, CAI Zaragoza and Landys & Gyr Wien
1989–90	Semi-finals	Eliminated by Knorr Bologna, losing 57–77 (L) in Bologna and winning 100–94 (W) in Thessaloniki
1990–91	Champions	Defeated CAI Zaragoza 76–72 in the European Cup Winners' Cup final in Geneva
1991–92	Final	Lost to Real Madrid Asegurator 63–65 in the final in Nantes
1995–96	Final	Lost to Taugrés 81–88 in the final in Vitoria
FIBA Korać Cup
1993–94	Champions	Defeated Stefanel Trieste 75–66 (W) in Thessaloniki and 100–91 (W) in Trieste in the two-legged Korać Cup final
EuroCup
2004–05	Quarter-finals	Eliminated by Lietuvos rytas, winning 74–71 (W) in Thessaloniki and losing 65–76 (L) in Vilnius
FIBA Europe Cup
2024–25	Final	Lost to Bilbao Basket, winning 84–82 (W) in Thessaloniki and losing 65–72 (L) in Bilbao
2025–26	Final	Lost to Bilbao Basket, winning 79–73 (W) in Thessaloniki and losing 74–89 (L) in Bilbao

== The road to the European Cup victories ==
1990–91 FIBA European Cup Winners' Cup

Round	Team	Home	Away
2nd	(England) Sunderland Saints	97–85	96–89
QF	(Spain) CAI Zaragoza	112–102	64–70
QF	(Socialist Federal Republic of Yugoslavia) Crvena zvezda	91–80	75–91
QF	(Israel) Hapoel Galil Elyon	107–77	79–80*
SF	(Soviet Union) Dynamo Moscow	95–82	63–75
F	(Spain) CAI Zaragoza	76–72	

- The game was held at Peristeri Arena, in Peristeri, Athens

1993–94 FIBA Korać Cup

Round	Team	Home	Away
3rd	(Russia) Stroitel Samara	101–56	81–77
Top 16	(Spain) Caja San Fernando	92–89	87–82
Top 16	(Italy) Recoaro Milano	71–67	74–76
Top 16	(Croatia) Zagreb	84–70	91–77
QF	(Italy) Scavolini Pesaro	96–58	66–82
SF	(Greece) Chipita Panionios	82–64	85–83
F	(Italy) Stefanel Trieste	75–66	100–91

== Season-by-season ==
Season	Greek League	Greek Cup	Europe	Head coach	Roster
1958–59	Champion	No tournament	No tournament	Iraklios Klagkas	Orestis Angelidis, Asteriadis, Constantinidis, Giorgos Oikonomou, Kiriakou, Klagkas, Kokkos, Pashalis, Stalios, Stergiou, Dimitris Dapontes, Theodoridis
1959–60	Runner Up	No tournament	Euroleague; Last 32		
1974–75	4th place	No tournament	Korać Cup; Last 32		
1975–76	9th place	Last 32	Korać Cup; Last 32		
1981–82	3rd place	Runner Up	Korać Cup; Last 32	Theodoros Rodopoulos	Vangelis Alexandris, Panagiotis Fasoulas, Manthos Katsoulis, Giannis Politis, Zaharias Katsoulis, Dimitris Kalpakis, Christos Konstantinidis, Thanasis Koumatsiotis, Gaitanis, Delapashos, Bourlivas, Stratis, Dimitris Tsakagiannis
1982–83	Runner Up	Last 4	Cup Winners' Cup; Last 16	Theodoros Rodopoulos	Vangelis Alexandris, Panagiotis Fasoulas, Giannis Politis, Zaharias Katsoulis, Alexis Bakopoulos, Dimitris Kalpakis, Christos Konstantinidis, Thanasis Koumatsiotis, Gaitanis, Polichronakos, Bourlivas, Michael Angelidis
1983–84	3rd place	Winner	Korać Cup; Last 16	Harry Pappas, Faidon Matthaiou	Panagiotis Fasoulas, Nikos Stavropoulos, Manthos Katsoulis, Vangelis Alexandris, Giannis Politis, Zaharias Katsoulis, Alexis Bakopoulos, Dimitris Kalpakis, Christos Konstantinidis, Thanasis Koumatsiotis, Polikratis, Michael Angelidis, Polichronakos
1984–85	Runner Up	Last 4	Cup Winners' Cup; Last 8	Josip Gjergja	Panagiotis Fasoulas, Nikos Stavropoulos, Steve Giatzoglou, Manthos Katsoulis, Vangelis Alexandris, Sotiris Sakellariou, Giannis Politis, Zaharias Katsoulis, Alexis Bakopoulos, Dimitris Kalpakis, Platon Hotokouridis, Thanasis Koumatsiotis, Bill Varner, Dick Mumma
1985–86	5th place	Last 16	Korać Cup; Last 16	Theodoros Rodopoulos	Takis Koroneos, Nikos Stavropoulos, Manthos Katsoulis, Sotiris Sakellariou, Zaharias Katsoulis, Takis Karatzoulidis, Alexis Bakopoulos, Dimitris Dontsios, Platon Hotokouridis, Thanasis Koumatsiotis, Panagiotis Kalogiros, Christos Konstantinidis, Bill Varner, Mark Simpson
1986–87	3rd place	Last 16	Korać Cup; Last 32	Orestis Angelidis	Panagiotis Fasoulas, Nikos Stavropoulos, Manthos Katsoulis, Sotiris Sakellariou, Zaharias Katsoulis, Takis Karatzoulidis, Alexis Bakopoulos, Jon Korfas, Platon Hotokouridis, Giorgos Makaras, Panagiotis Kalogiros, Delaney Rudd, Alvis Rogers, Eddie Kladis
1987–88	Runner Up	Last 8	Korać Cup; Last 16	Johnny Neumann	Panagiotis Fasoulas, Jon Korfas, Nikos Stavropoulos, Manthos Katsoulis, Takis Karatzoulidis, Giorgos Makaras, Alexis Bakopoulos, Zaharias Katsoulis, Sotiris Sakellariou, Platon Hotokouridis, Gerasimos Tzakis, Panagiotis Kalogiros, Delaney Rudd, Mark Petteway, Hatzigeorgiou, Metsas, Eddie Kladis
1988–89	Runner Up	Runner Up	Korać Cup; Last 16	Johnny Neumann, Kostas Politis	Mike Jones, Panagiotis Fasoulas, Bane Prelević, Jon Korfas, Nikos Stavropoulos, Takis Karatzoulidis, Giorgos Makaras, Bill Melis, Alexis Bakopoulos, Dimitris Dontsios, Hatzigeorgiou
1989–90	Runner Up	Runner Up	Cup Winners' Cup; Last 4	Kostas Politis	Anthony Cook, Bane Prelević, Panagiotis Fasoulas, Jon Korfas, Nikos Stavropoulos, Takis Karatzoulidis, Giorgos Makaras, Nikos Boudouris, Pete Papahronis, Achilleas Mamatziolas, Bill Melis, Theodoros Asteriadis, Christos Papasarantou
1990–91	Runner Up	Runner Up	Cup Winners' Cup; Winner	Kostas Politis, Sakis Laios, Dragan Šakota	Kenneth Barlow, Bane Prelević, Panagiotis Fasoulas, Nikos Stavropoulos, Nikos Boudouris, Giorgos Makaras, Jon Korfas, Pete Papahronis, Memos Ioannou, Achilleas Mamatziolas, Giorgos Valavanidis, Lazaros Tsakiris, Nick Katsikis, Tom Katsikis, Irving Thomas
1991–92	Champion	Last 4	European Cup; Runner Up	Dušan Ivković	Kenneth Barlow, Bane Prelević, Panagiotis Fasoulas, Jon Korfas, Nikos Boudouris, Pete Papahronis, Giorgos Makaras, Nikos Filippou, Nikos Stavropoulos, Dimitris Dimakopoulos, Nikos Katsikis, Theodoros Asteriadis, Thanasis Kotsopoulos, Giorgos Kouklakis, Achilleas Mamatziolas, Evripidis Meletiadis, Lazaros Tsakiris, Giorgos Valavanidis, Paliouras, Parisopoulos, Tsafrakidis, Karapournos
1992–93	3rd place	Last 8	EuroLeague; 3rd place	Dušan Ivković	Cliff Levingston, Kenneth Barlow, Bane Prelević, Panagiotis Fasoulas, Jon Korfas, Nikos Boudouris, Giorgos Balogiannis, Nikos Filippou, Christos Tsekos, Achilleas Mamatziolas, Nikos Katsikis, Giorgos Kouklakis, Giorgos Valavanidis, Stavros Koukouditskas
1993–94	Runner Up	Last 4	Korać Cup; Winner	Dušan Ivković, Soulis Markopoulos	Walter Berry, Bane Prelević, Zoran Savić, Nasos Galakteros, Efthimis Rentzias, Jon Korfas, Nikos Boudouris, Giorgos Balogiannis, Achilleas Mamatziolas, Christos Tsekos, Giorgos Valavanidis, Giorgos Kouklakis, Thanasis Kotsopoulos, Fotis Takianos
1994–95	4th place	Winner	EuroLeague; Last 16	Dragan Šakota, Sakis Laios, Vangelis Alexandris	Bane Prelević, Zoran Savić, Jerrod Mustaf, Matt Bullard, Jon Korfas, Nasos Galakteros, Giannis Giannoulis, Nikos Boudouris, Efthimis Rentzias, Peja Stojaković, Giorgos Balogiannis, Christos Tsekos, Lemone Lampley, Achilleas Mamatziolas, Kostas Christou, Milan Relic
1995–96	4th place	Last 16	European Cup; Runner Up	Vangelis Alexandris, E. Kioumourtzoglou, Željko Lukajić, Dimitris Itoudis	Bane Prelević, Lawrence Funderburke, Dean Garrett, Trevor Ruffin, Peja Stojaković, Efthimis Rentzias, Giorgos Balogiannis, Nikos Boudouris, Giannis Giannoulis, Achilleas Mamatziolas, Sotiris Nikolaidis, Christos Tsekos, Kostas Christou, Dimitris Koptis
1996–97	3rd place	Last 16	Korać Cup; Last 16	Michel Gomez, Scott Skiles	Scott Skiles, Peja Stojaković, Anthony Bonner, Dell Demps, Nikos Boudouris, Giorgos Balogiannis, Efthimis Rentzias, Giannis Giannoulis, Achilleas Mamatziolas, Sotiris Nikolaidis, Christos Tsekos, Stefan Baeck, Dimitris Despos, Giorgos Gallos, Dimitris Koptis, Thanasis Kotsopoulos
1997–98	Runner Up	Last 16	EuroLeague; Last 16	Zvi Sherf	Peja Stojaković, Charles Shackleford, Rafael Addison, Conrad McRae, Giorgos Balogiannis, Nikos Boudouris, Giannis Giannoulis, Lefteris Kakiousis, Giorgos Maslarinos, Juan Antonio Morales, Sotiris Nikolaidis, Ricardo Peral Antunez, Federico Pieri, Ron Rowan, Dimitris Despos, Dimitris Nesteropoulos, Vasilis Tsolakidis
1998–99	3rd place	Winner	EuroLeague; Last 32	Zvi Sherf, Kostas Flevarakis	Walter Berry, Frankie King, Claudio Coldebella, Giorgos Balogiannis, Giannis Giannoulis, Lefteris Kakiousis, Juan Antonio Morales, Ricardo Peral Antunez, Sotiris Nikolaidis, Giorgos Maslarinos, Dimitris Nesteropoulos, Kostas Christou, Dimitris Despos, Vasilis Tsolakidis, Dimitris Iliopoulos, Giannis Papahristou
1999–00	Runner Up	Last 16	EuroLeague; Last 16	Petar Skansi, Kostas Flevarakis	Victor Alexander, Bill Edwards, Bane Prelević, Sergei Bazarevich, Dinos Angelidis, Giorgos Balogiannis, Claudio Coldebella, Giannis Giannoulis, Sotiris Nikolaidis, Ricardo Peral Antunez, Nikos Vetoulas, Giorgos Maslarinos, Giannis Papahristou, Dimitris Iliopoulos
2000–01	8th place	Last 8	Euroleague; Last 16	Kostas Flevarakis, Ioannis Sfairopoulos	Angelos Koronios, Panagiotis Liadelis, Anthony Avent, Joseph Blair, Giorgos Sigalas, Giannis Giannoulis, Giorgos Limniatis, Kostas Vasileiadis, Jorge Racca, Josep Cargol, Claudio Coldebella, Frédéric Weis, Valeri Dainenko, Giorgos Apostolidis, Efthimios Galis, Theodoros Triftanidis
2001–02	8th place	Last 16	Korać Cup; Last 32	Slobodan Subotić, Vangelis Alexandris	Bill Edwards, Norman Nolan, Andre Woolridge, Panagiotis Liadelis, Nestoras Kommatos, Giorgos Sigalas, Panagiotis Vasilopoulos, Kostas Vasileiadis, Loukas Mavrokefalidis, Claudio Coldebella, Juan Antonio Morales, Giorgos Limniatis, Giorgos Apostolidis, Perry Carter Greene, Daniel Callahan (basketball), Kostas Vathis
2002–03	7th place	Last 16	EuroCup Challenge; Last 16	Bane Prelević	Brent Scott, Wendell Alexis, Branko Milisavljević, Nestoras Kommatos, Panagiotis Vasilopoulos, Kostas Vasileiadis, Loukas Mavrokefalidis, Giorgos Apostolidis, Giorgos Limniatis, Torraye Braggs, Predrag Materić, Kostas Christou, Dimitris Koptis, Pashalis Panagiotidis, Perry Carter Greene, Kostas Vathis, Savvas Manousos
2003–04	6th place	Last 16	EuroChallenge; Withdrawn	Bane Prelević	Damir Mulaomerović, Kasib Powell, Kostas Vasileiadis, Panagiotis Vasilopoulos, Loukas Mavrokefalidis, Ivica Jurković, Ronnie Fields, Alexander Okunsky, Aleksandar Radojević, Sotiris Manolopoulos, Spyros Panteliadis, Thanasis Kamariotis, Kosta Karamanolev, Charis Markopoulos, Giorgos Pasalidis, Ilias Tevetzidis
2004–05	6th place	Last 4	ULEB Cup; Last 8	Bane Prelević	Damir Mulaomerović, Matthew Nielsen, Kostas Vasileiadis, Panagiotis Vasilopoulos, Loukas Mavrokefalidis, Giannis Gagaloudis, Amit Tamir, Alexander Bashminov, Ivan Grgat, Giorgos Balogiannis, Kostas Maglos, Sotiris Manolopoulos, James Maye, Aristidis Koronidis, Andreas Kalampoukas
2005–06	6th place	Last 4	EuroChallenge; Last 32	Bane Prelević, Soulis Markopoulos	Loukas Mavrokefalidis, Kostas Vasileiadis, Vladimir Vuksanović, Giannis Gagaloudis, Stanislav Makshantsev, Mamadou N'Diaye, Tracy Murray, Chester Simmons, Vassilis Xanthopoulos, Dimitris Verginis, Hrvoje Henjak, Marijan Mance, Vladimir Zujovic, Sotiris Manolopoulos, Anestis Tzinopoulos, Giannis Vasiliou, Theodoros Georgitsis, Kostas Boutros, Andreas Kalampoukas
2006–07	6th place	Last 8	ULEB Cup; Last 16	Kostas Pilafidis, Vangelis Alexandris	Vlado Šćepanović, Giannis Kalambokis, Blagota Sekulić, Jerome Allen, Darius Washington, Jason Parker, Drago Pašalić, Đuro Ostojić, Andy Panko, Lazaros Agadakos, J.R. Bremer, Dimitris Verginis, C.J. Watson, Charis Giannopoulos, Dimitris Charitopoulos, Feliks Kojadinović, Nikos Kouvelas, Sotiris Manolopoulos, Ivan Tomas, Giannis Vasileiou, Carolos Galazoulas
2007–08	12th place	Last 8	EuroChallenge; Last 16	Tab Baldwin, Kostas Flevarakis, John Korfas	İbrahim Kutluay, Dimitris Verginis, Mamoutou Diarra, Edmund Saunders, Giorgos Tsiakos, Michael Hakim Jordan, Lee Humphrey, Dimitris Charitopoulos, Jason Rowe, Reda Rhalimi, Giannis Demertzis, Carolos Galazoulas, Charis Giannopoulos, Antoine Gillespie, Steven Hansell, Zoltán Horváth, Nikos Kouvelas, Martin Ringström, Thrasivoulos Sfeikos, Giannis Vasileiou
2008–09	7th place	Last 16	Not participated	Argyris Pedoulakis, Georgios Kalafatakis	Dejan Tomašević, Damir Mulaomerović, Christos Charissis, Alexis Kyritsis, Mamoutou Diarra, Panagiotis Kafkis, Britton Johnsen, Vassilis Simtsak, Giorgos Tsiaras, Carolos Galazoulas, Michalis Giannakidis, Dimitris Kalampakas, Dimitris Marmarinos, Ioannis Demertzis, Kostas Vasileiadis, Kenny Gregory, Tony Akins, K'zell Wesson, Antonis Kesisoglou, Charalambos Sikalidis, Nikos Papadopoulos
2009–10	5th place	Last 8	Not participated	Soulis Markopoulos	Chris Monroe, Panagiotis Kafkis, Kenny Gregory, Christos Tapoutos, Nikos Kalles, Tomas Delininkaitis, Branko Milisavljević, Dimitris Kalaitzidis, Giorgos Tsiaras, Lazaros Papadopoulos, Michalis Giannakidis, Predrag Drobnjak, Todor Gečevski, Ioannis Demertzis, Wade Helliwell, William Avery
2010–11	3rd place	Last 4	Eurocup; Group Stage	Soulis Markopoulos	Rawle Marshall, Dionte Christmas, Dimitris Arapis, Giorgos Apostolidis, Giorgos Dedas, Robert Dozier, Dante Stiggers, Zvonko Buljan, Michalis Giannakidis, Nikos Kalles, Todor Gečevski, Dimitris Kalabakas (DeShawn Sims, Justin Gray, Lazaros Papadopoulos left during the season)
2011–12	8th place	Last 4	Euroleague; Qualifying round	Soulis Markopoulos	Miloš Bojović, Dante Stiggers, Dimitris Arapis, Milutin Aleksić, Uroš Duvnjak, Dimos Dikoudis, Aaron Pettway, Nikos Pappas, Michalis Giannakidis, Nikos Kalles, Dimitris Kalabakas, Efthymios Tsakaleris (J.R. Giddens, Marcus Gorée, Giannis Kalampokis, Rashad Wright left during the season)
2011–12	8th place	Last 4	Eurocup; Group Stage	Soulis Markopoulos	Miloš Bojović, Dante Stiggers, Dimitris Arapis, Milutin Aleksić, Uroš Duvnjak, Dimos Dikoudis, Aaron Pettway, Nikos Pappas, Michalis Giannakidis, Nikos Kalles, Dimitris Kalabakas, Efthymios Tsakaleris (J.R. Giddens, Marcus Gorée, Giannis Kalampokis, Rashad Wright left during the season)
2012–13	5th place	Last 16	Not participated	Soulis Markopoulos	Will Hatcher, Leonidas Kaselakis, Kostas Charalampidis, Giorgos Theodorakos, Michalis Tsairelis, Giorgos Dedas, Vangelis Margaritis, Lazaros Papadopoulos, Ntinos Nikolopoulos, Nikos Kalles, Alexandros Varitimiadis, Linos Chrysikopoulos, Michalis Liapis, Thomas Ambaras
2013–14	3rd place	Last 16	Eurocup; Group Stage	Soulis Markopoulos	4 Mark Payne, 5 D. J. Cooper, 6 Kostas Charalampidis, 7 Apollon Tsochlas, 8 Goran Vučićević, 9 Michalis Tsairelis, 10 Giorgos Dedas, 11 Vangelis Margaritis, 12 Nikos Kalles, 13 Giorgos Bogris, 14 Leonidas Kaselakis, 17 Michalis Liapis, 18 Antonis Koniaris, 19 Thomas Kottas
2014–15	3rd place	Last 4	Eurocup; Last 32	Soulis Markopoulos	4 Kevin Langford, 5 Michalis Liapis, 6 Kostas Charalampidis, 7 T. J. Carter, 8 Kostas Kakaroudis, 9 Apollon Tsochlas, 10 Giorgos Dedas, 11 Vangelis Margaritis, 12 Thomas Kottas 13 Jake Odum, 16 J.R. Bremer, 18 Dimitris Charitopoulos, 19 Christos Saloustros (Edi Sinadinović, Julian Vaughn left during season)
2015–16	5th place	Last 4	Eurocup; Last 32	Soulis Markopoulos	4 Milenko Tepić, 5 Michalis Liapis, 6 Kostas Charalampidis, 7 Kostas Vasileiadis, 8 Kostas Kakaroudis, 9 Apollon Tsochlas, 10 Giorgos Dedas, 11 Vangelis Margaritis, 12 Thomas Kottas, 15 Sofoklis Schortsanitis, 19 Nikos Kamaras, 20 Uroš Duvnjak, 21 Nikola Marković, 25 Will Hatcher, 33 Keith Clanton (Darko Balaban left during season)
2016–17	5th place	Last 8	Basketball Champions League; Last 16	Soulis Markopoulos	2 Nathan Sobey, 4 Linos Chrysikopoulos, 6 Antonis Koniaris, 9 Apollon Tsochlas, 11 Vangelis Margaritis, 12 Thad McFadden, 13 Nenad Miljenović, 14 Andreas Glyniadakis, 16 Dimitris Karamanolis, 18 Jordan Sibert, 19 Nikos Kamaras, 20 Vassilis Papadopoulos, 31 Žanis Peiners, 33 Keith Clanton, 42 Ivan Aska (Brandon Taylor, Darryl Bryant left during season)
2017–18	3rd place	Last 8	Basketball Champions League; Last 16	Ilias Papatheodorou	2 Terran Petteway, 4 Linos Chrysikopoulos, 5 Ousman Krubally, 8 Thodoris Karras, 6 Antonis Koniaris, 9 Apollon Tsochlas, 10 Giannis Giannaras, Vangelis Margaritis, 13 Thodoris Zaras, 15 Vassilis Charalampopoulos, 16 Dimitris Karamanolis, 19 Dimitris Katsivelis, 20 Dimitris Klonaras, 21 Darnell Jackson, 55 Lucky Jones, 32Phil Goss (Kevin Dillard, Owen Klassen, Brandon Triche left during season)
2018–19	5th place	Runner Up	Basketball Champions League; Last 16	Ilias Papatheodorou	1 Jamal Jones 2 Johndre Jefferson, 4 Linos Chrysikopoulos, 5 Stavros Schizas, 6 Antonis Koniaris, 8 Milenko Tepic, 9 Apollon Tsochlas, 11 Vangelis Margaritis, 13 Thodoris Zaras, 25 William Hatcher, 31 Darrius Garrett, 32 Phil Goss (Yanick Moreira, Giannis Athinaiou, Malik Pope, Nondas Papantoniou left during season)
2019–20	14th place / curtailed season due to COVID-19 pandemic	Last 8	Basketball Champions League; Group Stage	Kostas Flevarakis, Kostas Charalampidis, Kostas Mexas	0 M. J. Rhett, 2 Adam Smith, 6 Bobby Brown, 5 Stavros Schizas, 8 Thodoris Karras, 9 Apollon Tsochlas, 10 Ioannis Chatzinikolas, 11 Vangelis Margaritis, 12 Aaron Best, 16 Dimitris Karamanolis, 20 Konstantinos Iatridis, 22 JaCorey Williams, 24 Shannon Shorter, 34 Zisis Sarikopoulos (JeQuan Lewis, Antwaine Wiggins, Amanze Egekeze, Zane Knowles left during season)
2020–21	5th place	Last 4	Not participated	Kostas Mexas, Aris Lykogiannis	2 Beau Beech, 5 Sagaba Konate, 6 Jermaine Love, 8 Malcolm Griffin, 10 Georgios Tsalmpouris, 11 Vangelis Margaritis, Anagnostis Papasavoglou, 14 Dimitris Kaklamanakis, 15 Antonis Karagiannidis, 17 Apostolos Roumoglou, 20 Konstantinos Iatridis, 21 Georgios Kamperidis, 22 Nondas Papantoniou, 23 Josh Carter, 31 Elston Turner Jr., 55 Elijah Mitrou-Long (Alan Herndon left during season)
2021–22	9th place	Last 8	Basketball Champions League play-ins prior to the qualification to the round of 16	Aris Lykogiannis	1 Demetre Rivers, 2 Anthony Lee, 4 Phil Greene IV, 5 Antreas Christodoulou, 6 Jermaine Love, 13 Nikos Kamarianos, 14 David DiLeo, 15 Theodoros Konstantinidis, 16 Vangelis Mantzaris, 17 Apostolos Roumoglou, 18 Prodromos Tachiridis, 19 Stratos Kalliontzis, 21 Georgios Kamperidis, 31 Vassilis Toliopoulos, 33 Vlado Janković, 35 Nate Renfro (Michalis Kamperidis, Josh Carter, Derek Ogbeide, Malcolm Griffin, 24 Marvin Jones left during season)
2022–23	4th place	Quarter-finals	Basketball Champions League play-ins prior to the qualification to the round of 16	Aris Lykogiannis, Fotis Takianos	0 Yannick Franke, 2 Zaccheus Darko-Kelly, 5 Jalen Riley, 6 Nikos Tsiakmas, 8 Jaylen Hands, 11 Vangelis Margaritis, 12 Tyler Polley, 13 Diamantis Slaftsakis,15 Thodoris Konstantinidis, 18 Jordan Sibert, 19 Stratos Kalliontzis, 20 Dimitris Kaklamanakis, 21 Georgios Kamperidis, 22 Christos Saloustros, 35 Nate Renfro, 40 Thodoris Skoulariotis (Zisis Sarikopoulos and Vassilis Christidis left during season)
2023–24	8th place	Quarter-finals	Basketball Champions League play-ins prior to the qualification to the round of 16	Fotis Takianos	1 Marques Townes, 4 Jamuni McNeace, 6 Nikos Tsiakmas, 8 Stavros Schizas, 9 Michalis Tsairelis, 10 Elvar Már Friðriksson, 11 Vangelis Margaritis, 12 Cecil Williams, 15 Thodoris Konstantinidis, 19 Nikos Arsenopoulos, 20 Thodoris Skoulariotis, 21 Aristotelis Sotiriou, 23 Michał Michalak, 32 Justin Alston, 77 Kevin Porter Jr. (Skyler Flatten, Kendall Smith, Laurynas Beliauskas, Andrew Harrison and Michael Gilmore left during season)
2024–25	6th place	Semi-finals	Basketball Champions League; Qualifying Round; FIBA Europe Cup; Runner Up	Massimo Cancellieri	1 Jacob Grandison, 2 Cedric Henderson Jr., 9 Devonte Upson, 10 Jacob Forrester, 13 Konstantinos Iatridis, 18 Nikos Persidis, 19 Dimitrios Katsivelis, 20 Thodoris Skoulariotis, 21 Vangelis Giannatos, 23 Kostas Papadakis, 24 Frank Bartley, 29 Alex Antetokounmpo, 31 Christos Manthopoulos (loaned during the season), 33 Shavar Reynolds Jr., 34 Jackson Kreuser (Panagiotis Lefas left during the season)
2025–26	3rd place	Quarter-finals	Basketball Champions League; Qualifying Round; FIBA Europe Cup; Runner Up	Jure Zdovc; Pantelis Boutskos	0 Timmy Allen, 2 Cleveland Melvin, 5 Breein Tyree, 6 Antonis Koniaris, 10 Diamantis Slaftsakis, 11 Clifford Omoruyi, 13 Theodoros Zaras, 18 Nikos Persidis, 20 Konstantinos Iatridis, 21 Patrick Beverley, 25 Giorgos Fillios, 26 Ben Moore, 31 Christos Manthopoulos, 33 Tomas Dimša, 34 Michalis Nousios (K. J. Jackson, Marvin Jones and Stephen Brown Jr. left during the season)
2026–27	TBD	TBD	EuroCup; TBD	Andrea Trinchieri	0 RaiQuan Gray, 1 Naz Mitrou-Long, 5 Breein Tyree, 6 Cedi Osman, 8 Kyle Alexander, 9 Nikos Chougkaz, 12 Trevor Hudgins, 14 Dimitris Kaklamanakis, 17 Marcus Foster, 18 Nikos Persidis, 20 Donatas Motiejūnas, 25 Giorgos Fillios, 26 Ben Moore, 33 Nick Calathes, 77 Nasos Bazinas (Clifford Omoruyi left during the season)

== Notable players ==
Note: Flags indicate national team eligibility at FIBA-sanctioned events. Players may hold other non-FIBA nationalities not displayed.

Criteria

To appear in this section a player must have either:

- Set a club record or won an individual award while at the club
- Played at least one official international match for their national team at any time
- Played at least one official NBA match at any time.

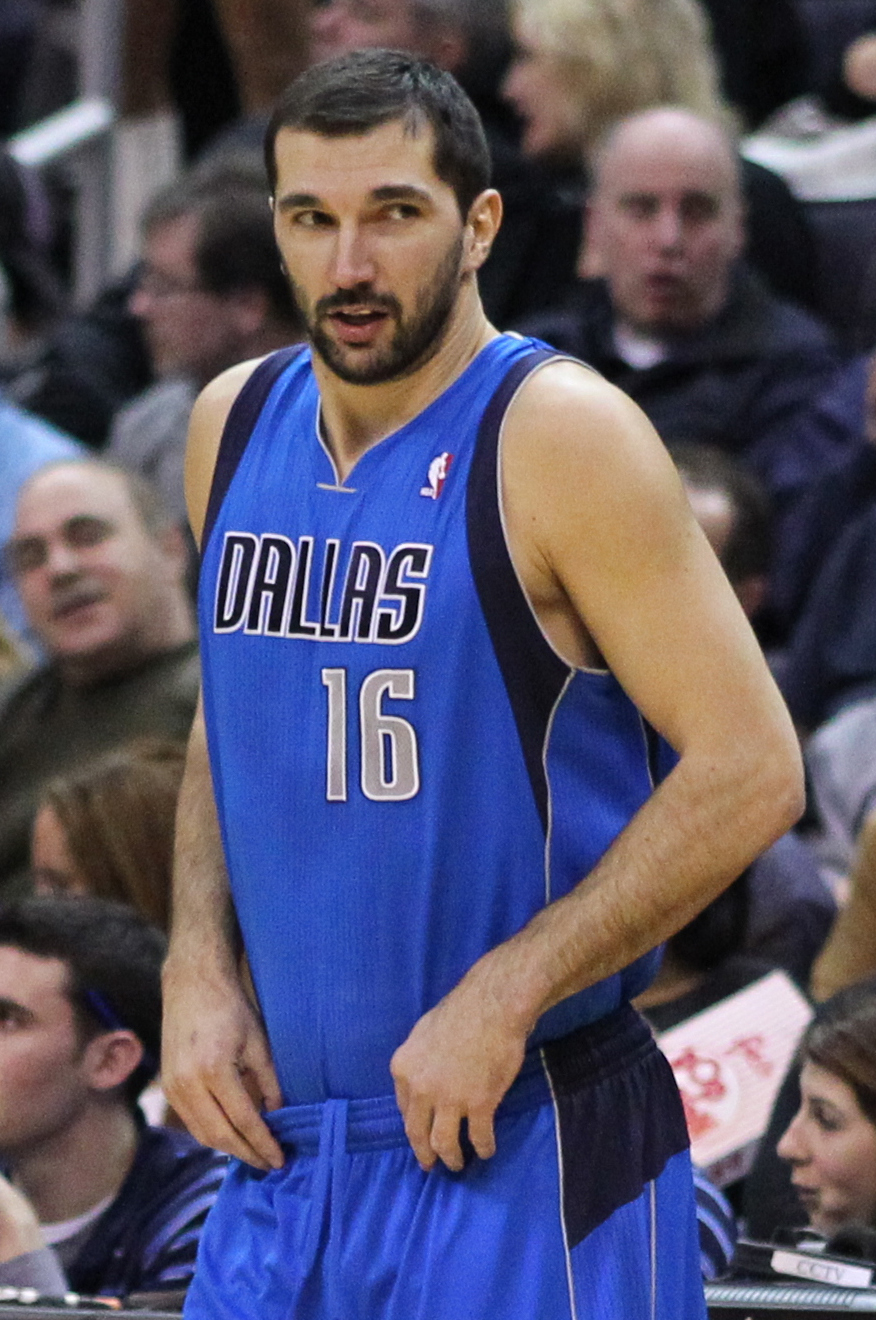
Peja Stojaković

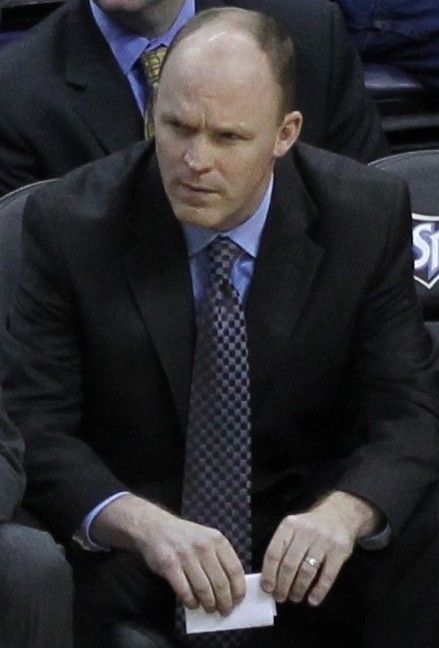
Scott Skiles

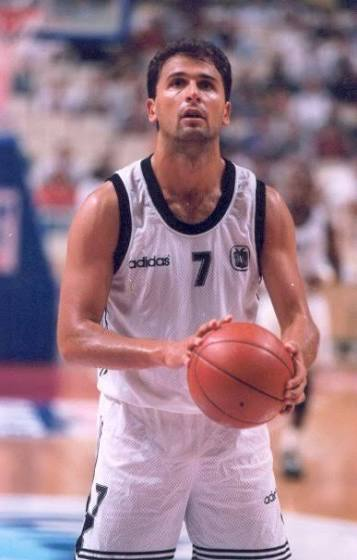
Bane Prelević

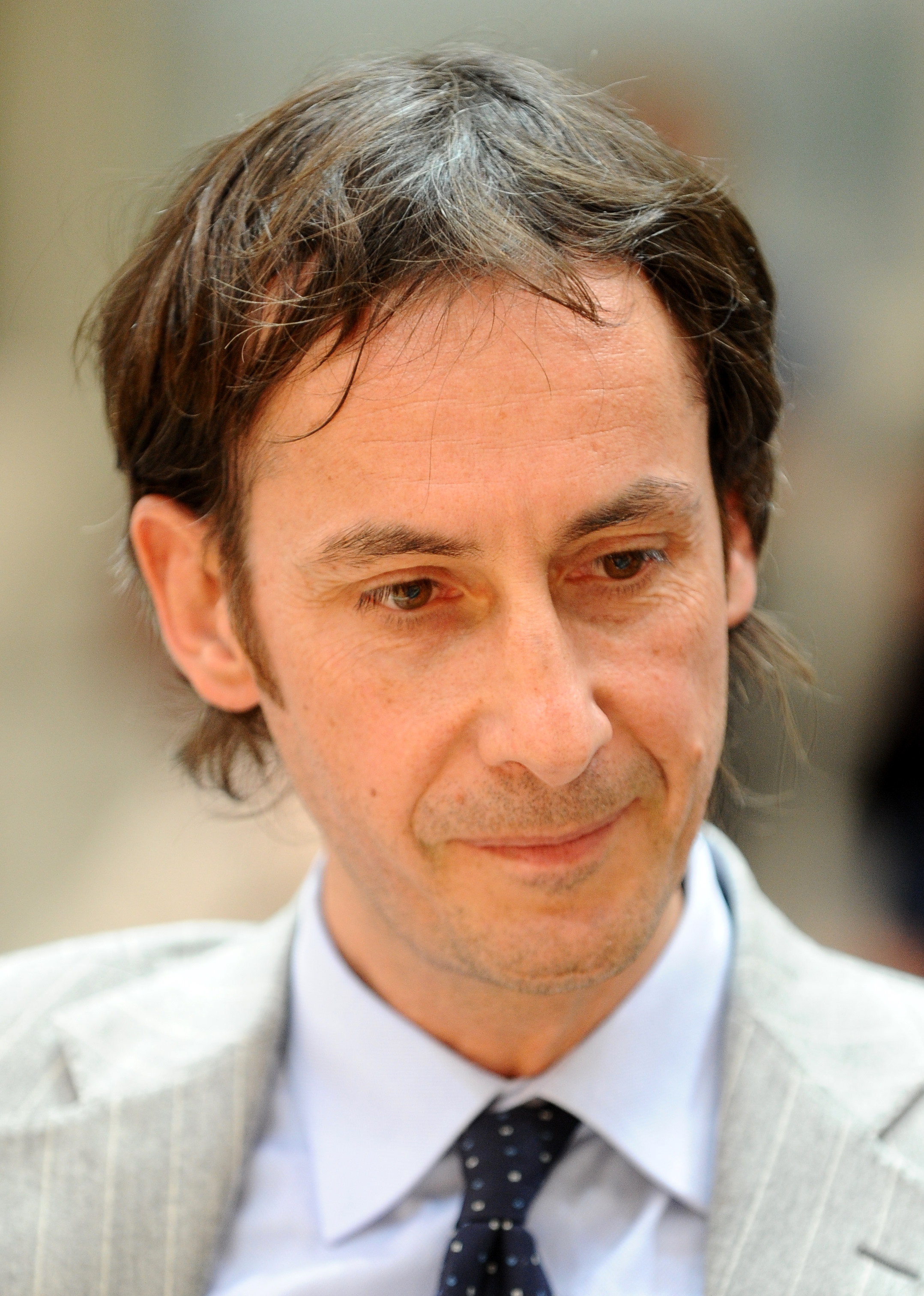
Claudio Coldebella

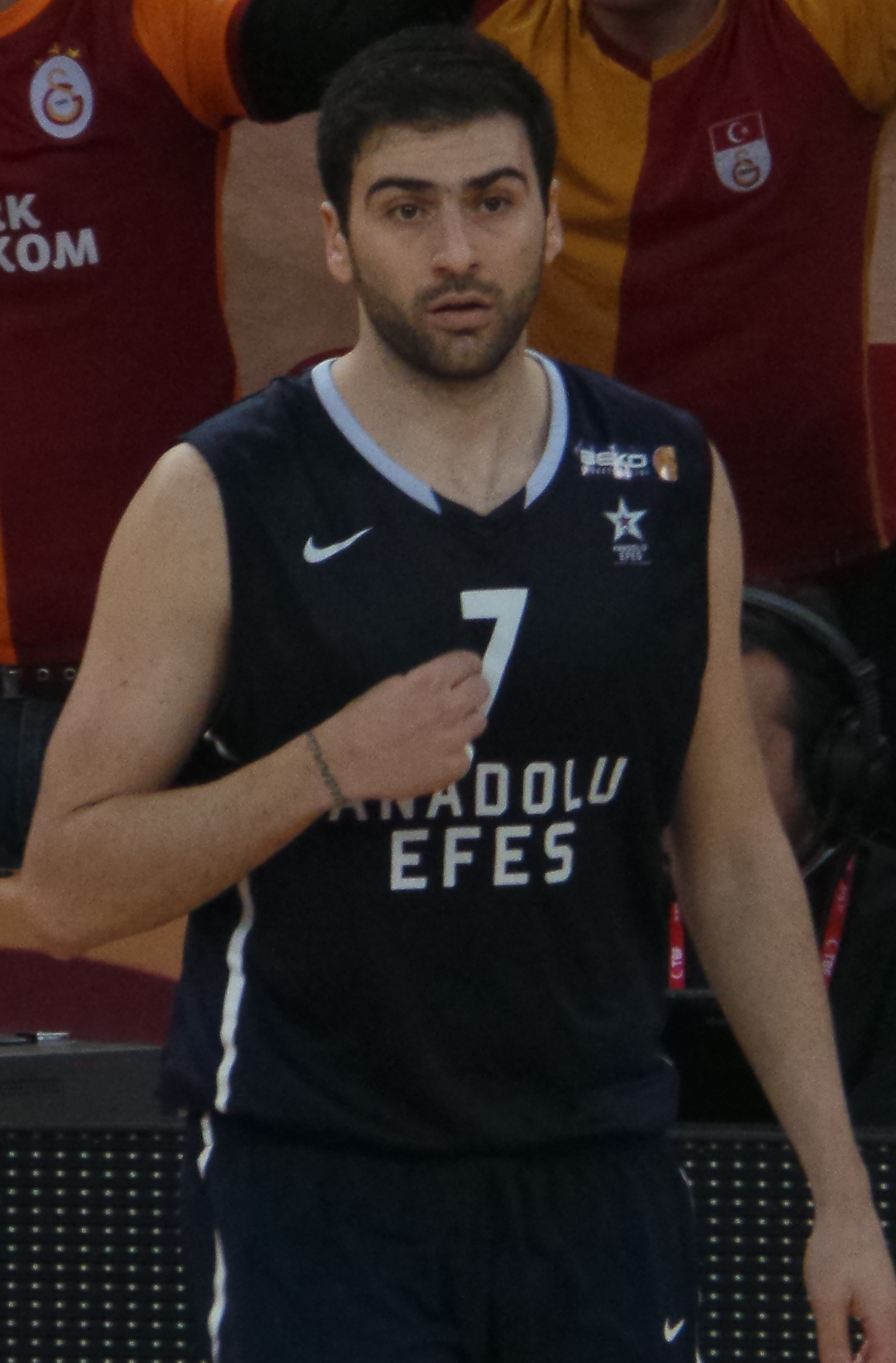
Kostas Vasileiadis

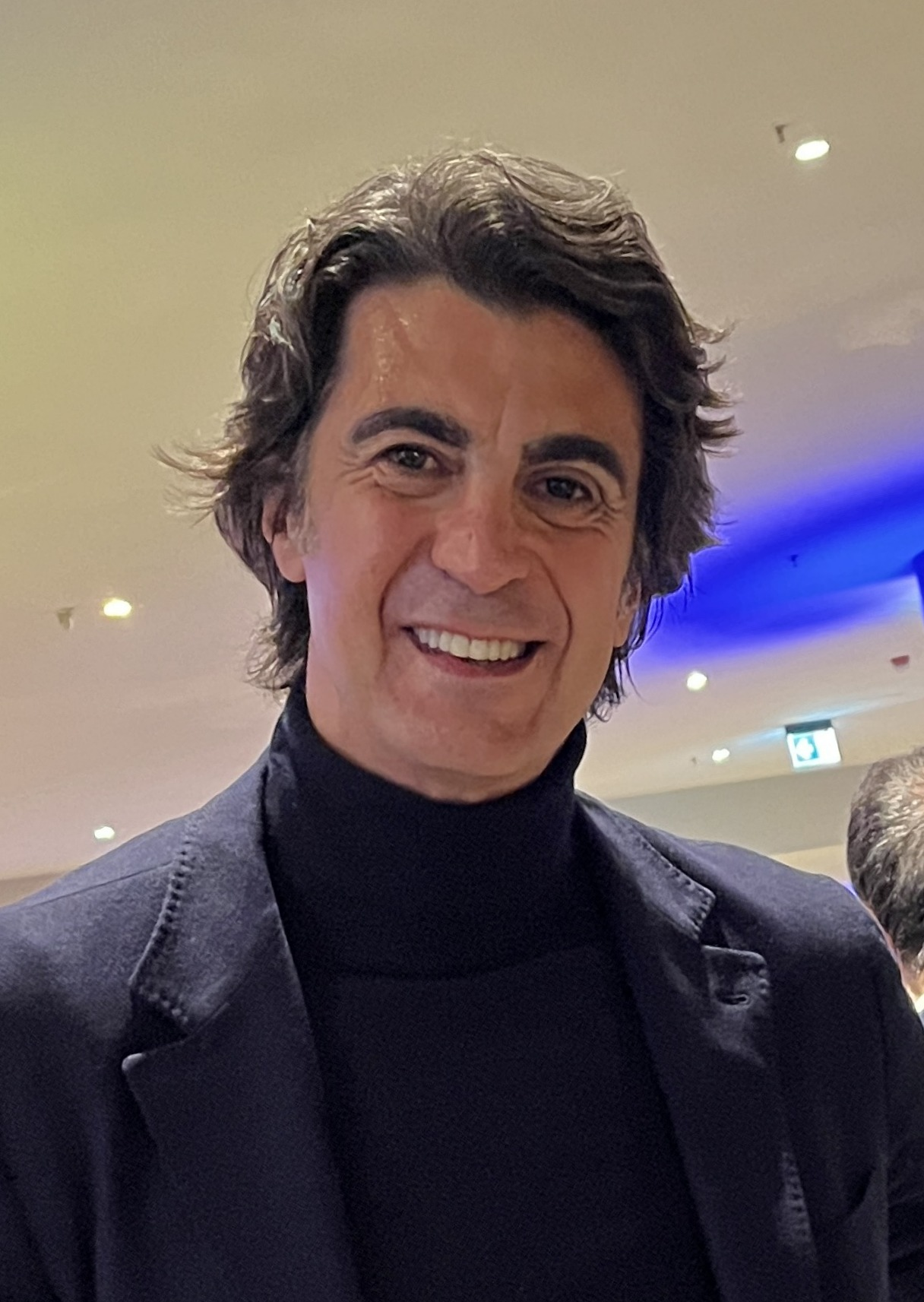
İbrahim Kutluay

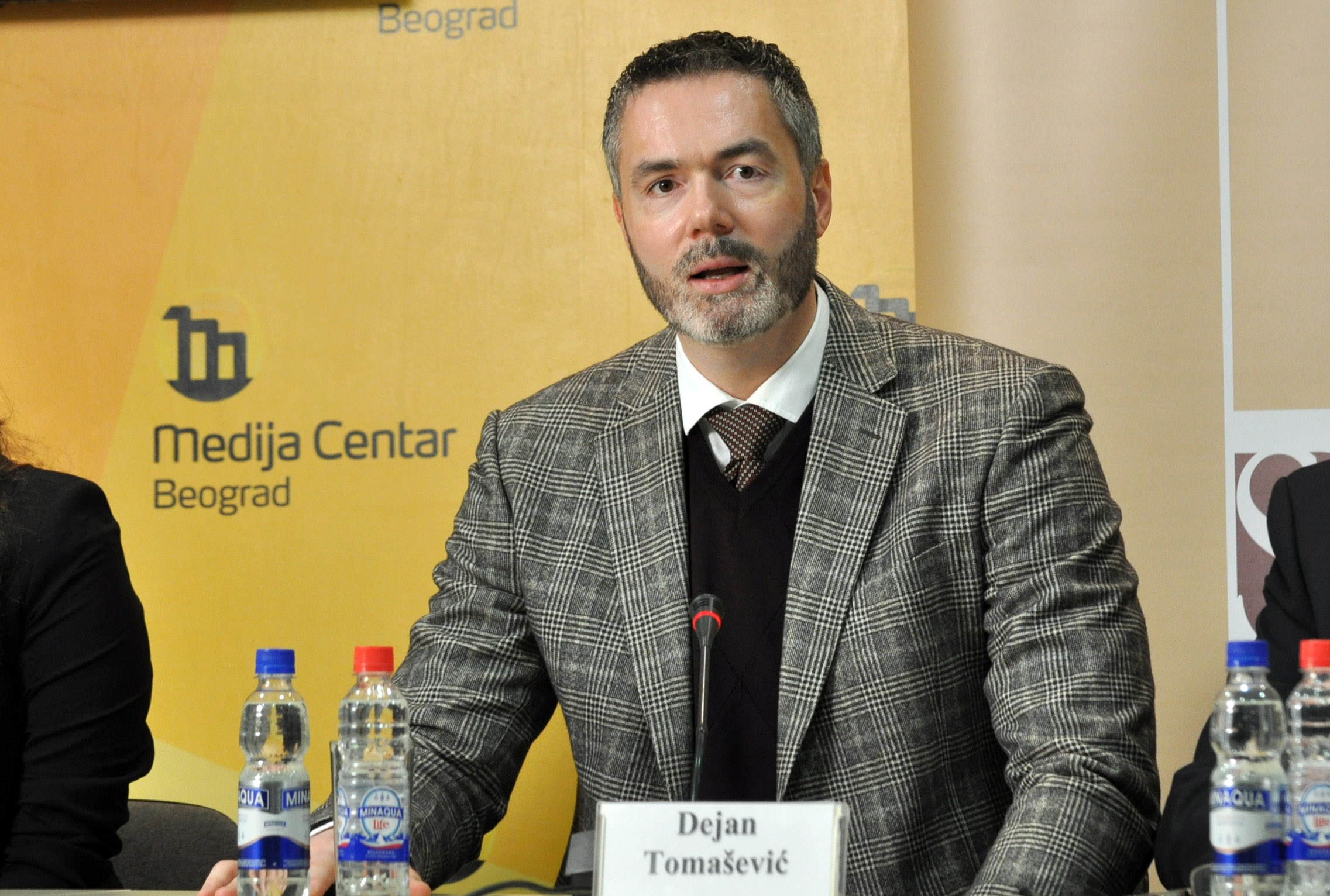
Dejan Tomašević

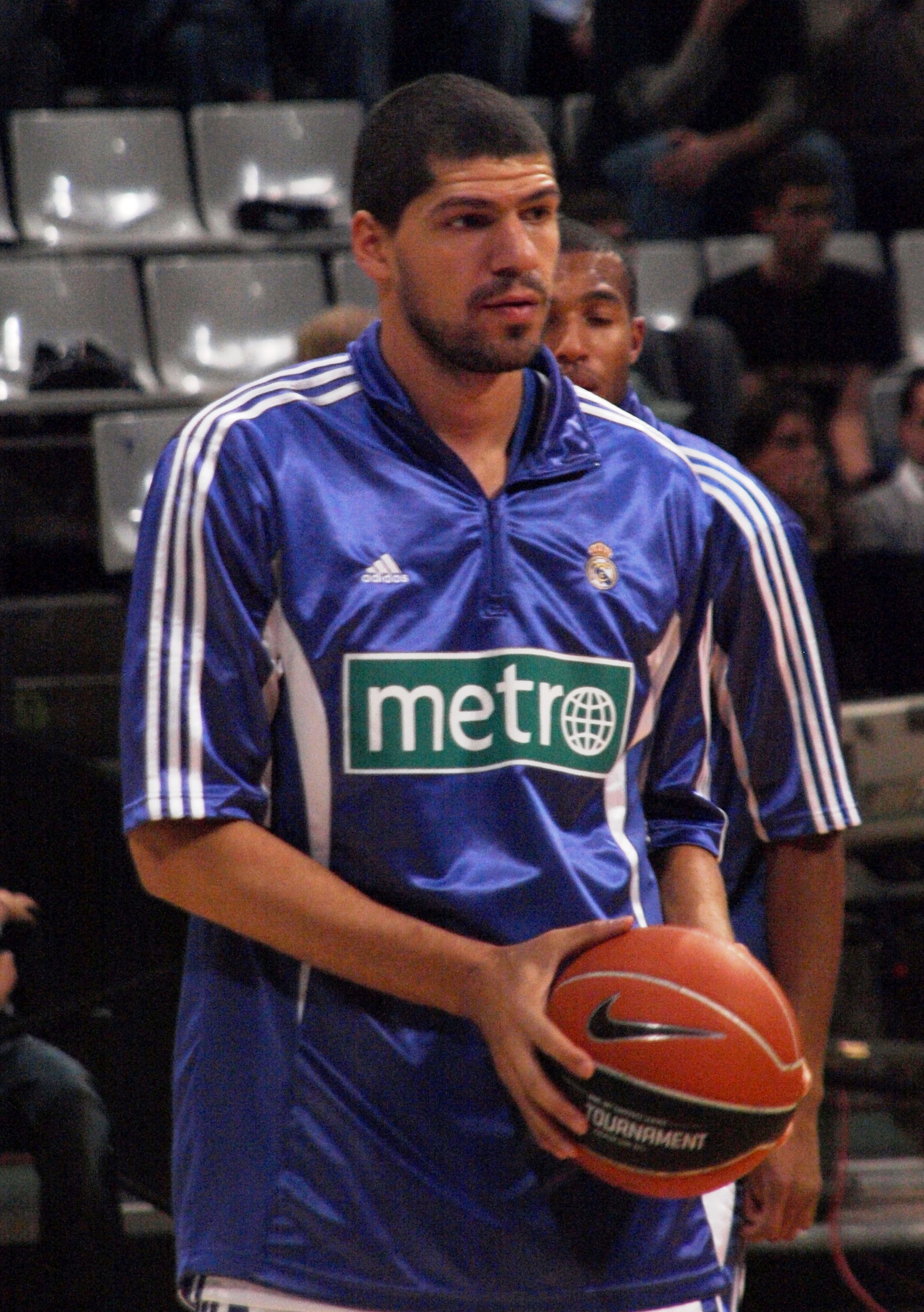
Lazaros Papadopoulos

Greece

- (Greece) Vangelis Alexandris
- (Greece) Georgios Balogiannis
- (Greece) Nikos Boudouris
- (Greece) (United States) Nick Calathes
- (Greece) Kostas Charalampidis
- (Greece) Vassilis Charalampopoulos
- (Greece) Dimos Dikoudis
- (Greece) Panagiotis Fasoulas
- (Greece) Nikos Filippou
- (Greece) Ioannis Gagaloudis
- (Greece) Nasos Galakteros
- (Greece) Giannis Giannoulis
- (Greece) (United States) Steve Giatzoglou
- (Greece) Memos Ioannou
- (Greece) Lefteris Kakiousis
- (Greece) Takis Karatzoulidis
- (Greece) Dimitrios Katsivelis
- (Greece) Manthos Katsoulis
- (Greece) Nestoras Kommatos
- (Greece) (United States) Jon Korfas
- (Greece) Takis Koroneos
- (Greece) Angelos Koronios
- (Greece) Panagiotis Liadelis
- (Greece) Georgios Makaras
- (Greece) Achilleas Mamatziolas
- (Greece) Sotiris Manolopoulos
- (Greece) Vangelis Margaritis
- (Greece) Loukas Mavrokefalidis
- (Greece) Georgios Oikonomou
- (Greece) (United States) Pete Papachronis
- (Greece) Lazaros Papadopoulos
- (Greece) Efthimios Rentzias
- (Greece) Sofoklis Schortsanitis
- (Greece) Georgios Sigalas
- (Greece) Nikos Stavropoulos
- (Greece) Christos Tsekos
- (Greece) Apollon Tsochlas
- (Greece) Kostas Vasileiadis
- (Greece) Panagiotis Vasilopoulos

USA

- (United States) Rafael Addison
- (United States) Victor Alexander
- (United States) Wendell Alexis
- (United States) Ken Barlow
- (United States) Frank Bartley
- (United States) Walter Berry
- (United States) Patrick Beverley
- (United States) Anthony Bonner
- (United States) Matt Bullard
- (United States) Anthony Cook
- (United States) Bill Edwards
- (United States) Lawrence Funderburke
- (United States) Phil Goss
- (United States) Will Hatcher
- (United States) Mike Jones
- (United States) Frankie King
- (United States) Cliff Levingston
- (United States) Jermaine Love
- (United States) Conrad McRae
- (United States) Jerrod Mustaf
- (United States) Kevin Porter Jr.
- (United States) Kasib Powell
- (United States) (Republic of Ireland) Ron Rowan
- (United States) Trevor Ruffin
- (United States) Charles Shackleford
- (United States) Scott Skiles
- (United States) (Albania) Breein Tyree
- (United States) (Belgium) Bill Varner
- (United States) (North Macedonia) Darius Washington

Europe

- (Russia) (Greece) Sergei Bazarevich
- (Italy) Claudio Coldebella
- (Lithuania) Tomas Delininkaitis
- (France) Mamoutou Diarra
- (Montenegro) Peja Drobnjak
- (Netherlands) Yannick Franke
- (Iceland) Elvar Már Friðriksson
- (North Macedonia) Todor Gečevski
- (Turkey) İbrahim Kutluay
- (Serbia) Branko Milisavljević
- (Spain) Juan Antonio Morales
- (Lithuania) Donatas Motiejūnas
- (Bosnia and Herzegovina) Damir Mulaomerović
- (Slovenia) (Greece) Rasho Nesterović
- (Turkey) Cedi Osman
- (Latvia) Žanis Peiners
- (Serbia) (Greece) Bane Prelević
- (Serbia) Zoran Savić
- (Montenegro) Vlado Šćepanović
- (Montenegro) Blagota Sekulić
- (Serbia) (Greece) Peja Stojaković
- (Serbia) Dejan Tomašević

South America

- (Guyana) (United States) Rawle Marshall

Africa

- (Senegal) Mamadou N'Diaye

Oceania

- (Australia) Matt Nielsen

== Club captains ==
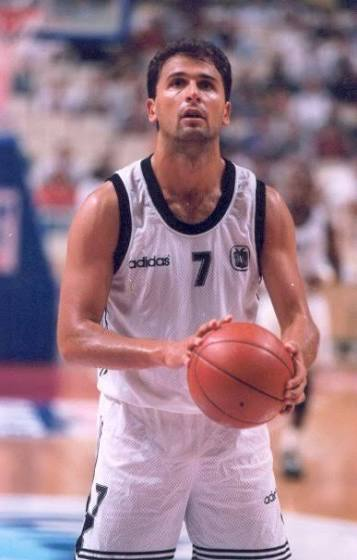
Bane Prelević

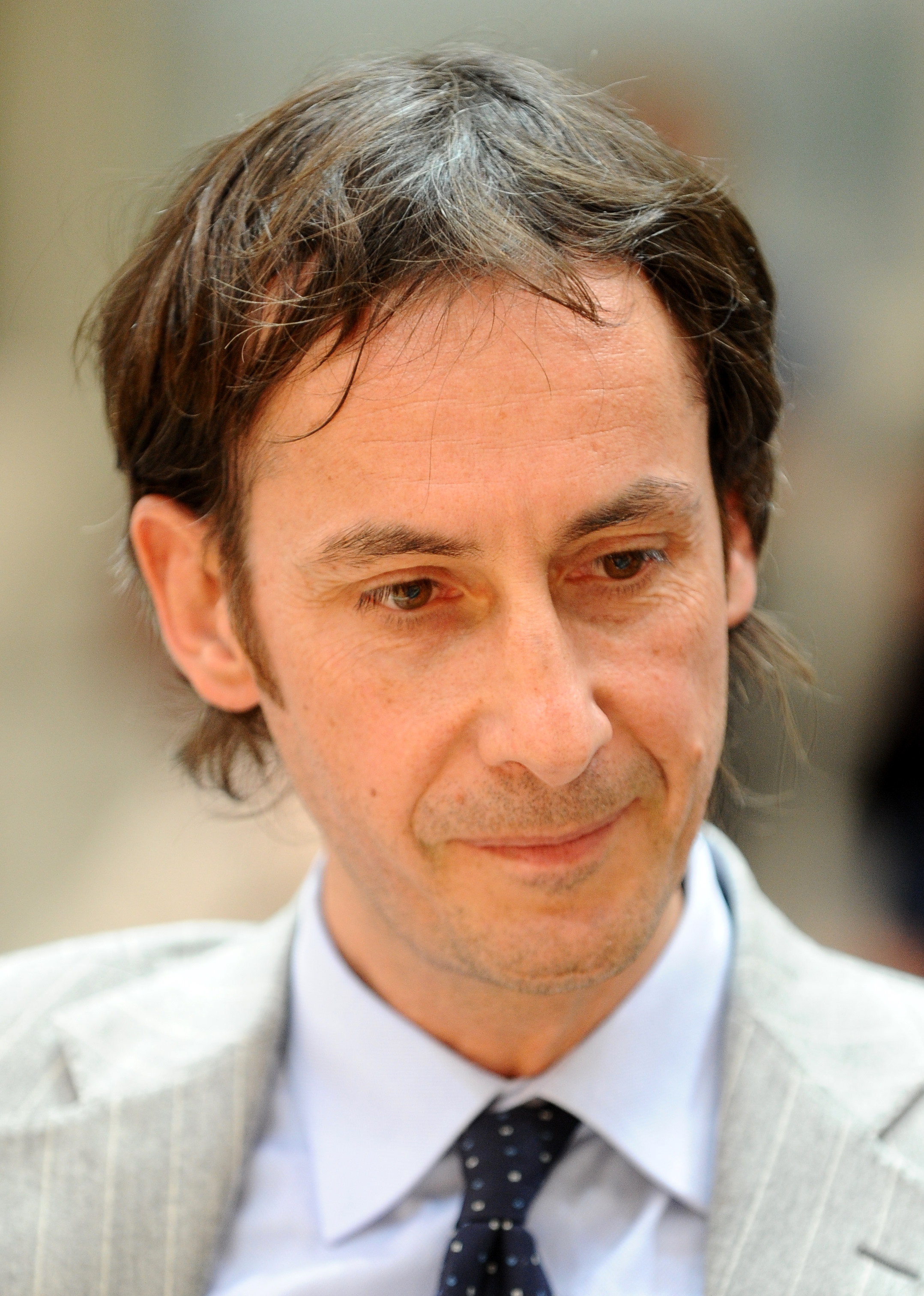
Claudio Coldebella

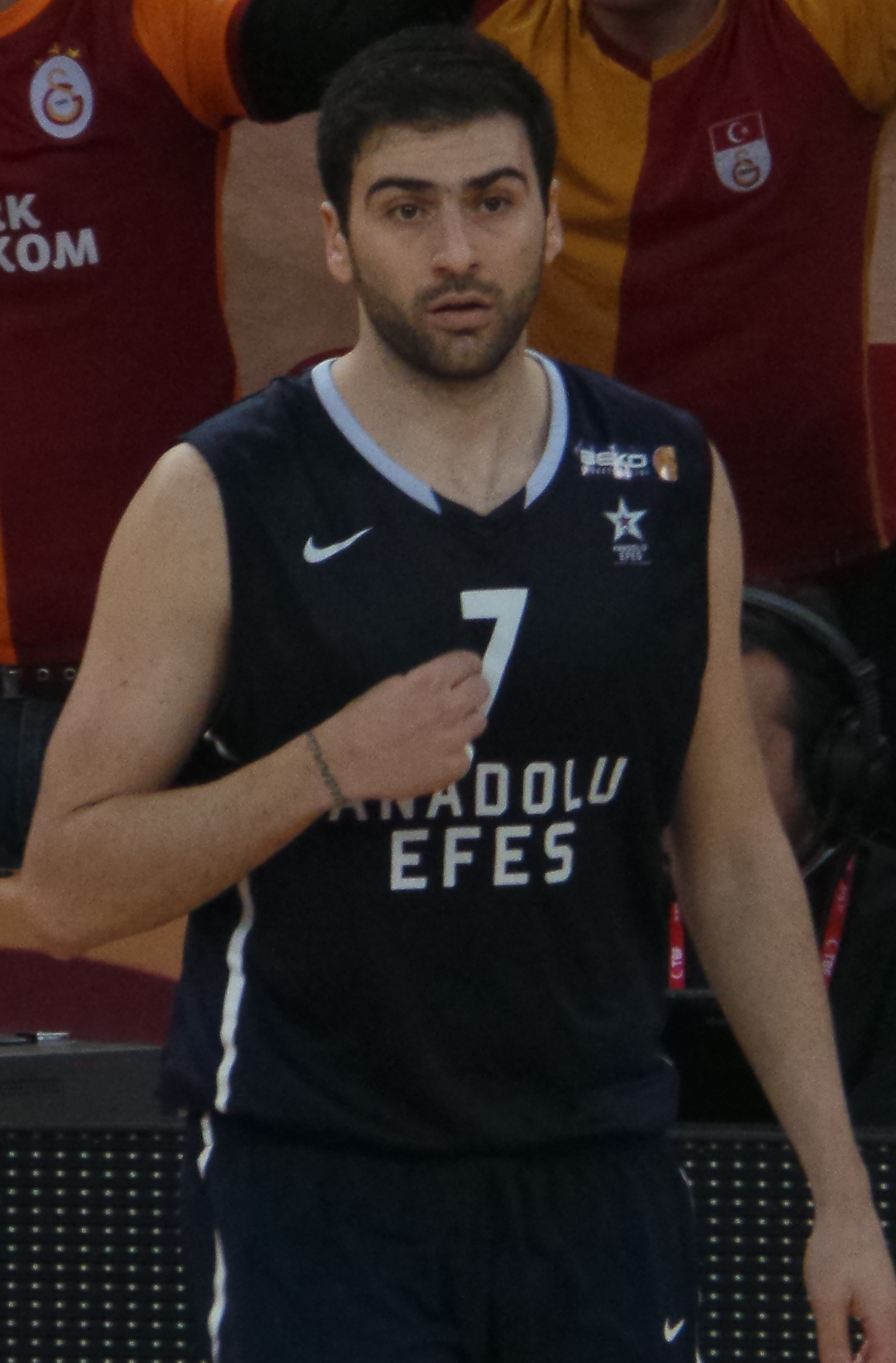
Kostas Vasileiadis

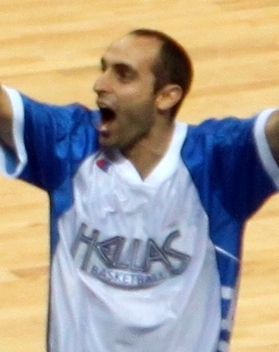
Giannis Kalampokis

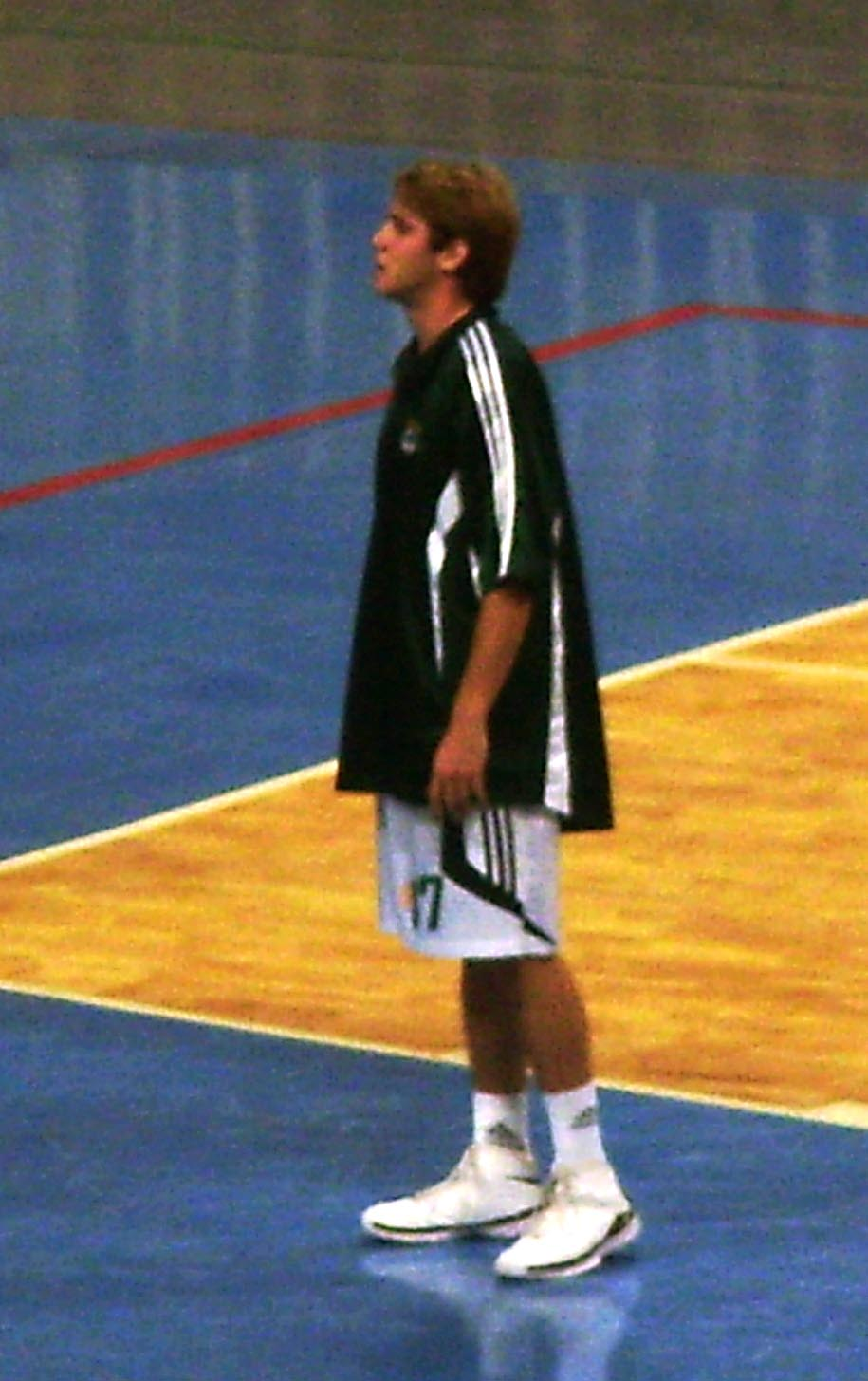
Dimitris Verginis

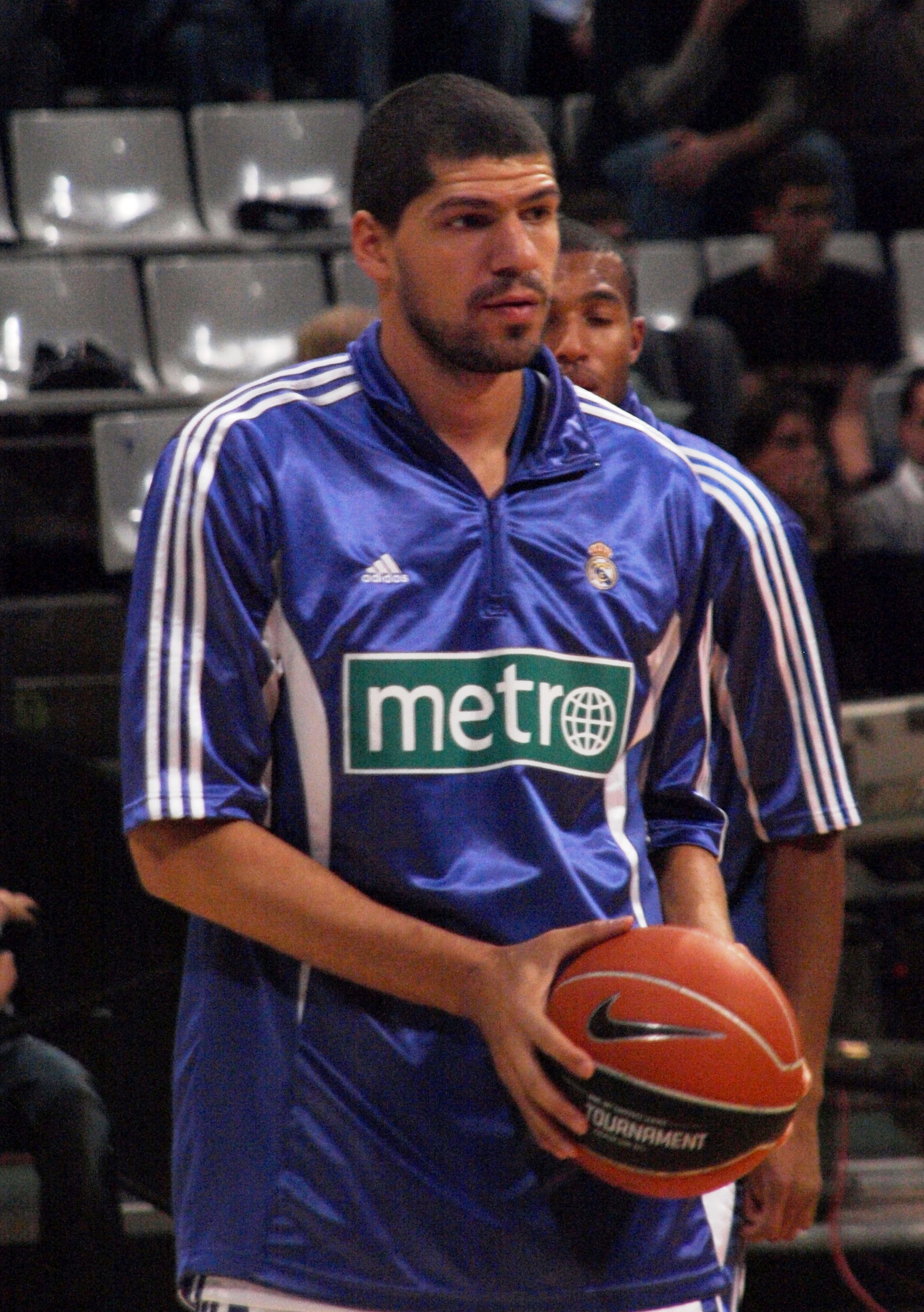
Lazaros Papadopoulos

P.A.O.K. B.C. team captains, since the 1979–80 season:

Period	Team captain
1979–1984	(Greece) Giannis Politis
1984–1988	(Greece) Manthos Katsoulis
1988–1993	(Greece) Panagiotis Fasoulas
1993–1996	(Federal Republic of Yugoslavia) Bane Prelević
1996–1998	(Greece) Nikos Boudouris
1998–2000	(Greece) Georgios Balogiannis
2000–2001	(Greece) Giannis Giannoulis
2001–2002	(Italy) Claudio Coldebella
2002–2003	(Greece) Georgios Limniatis
2003–2006	(Greece) Kostas Vasileiadis
2006–2007	(Greece) Giannis Kalampokis
2007–2008	(Greece) Dimitris Verginis
2008–2009	(Greece) Kostas Vasileiadis
2009	(Greece) Christos Charissis
2009–2010	(Greece) Dimitris Kalaitzidis
2010–2011	(Greece) Lazaros Papadopoulos
2011–2012	(Greece) Michalis Giannakidis
2012–2013	(Greece) Lazaros Papadopoulos
2013–2015	(Greece) Kostas Charalampidis
2015–2016	(Greece) Kostas Vasileiadis
2016–2021	(Greece) Vangelis Margaritis
2021–2022	(United States) Jermaine Love
2022–2024	(Greece) Vangelis Margaritis
2024–2025	(Greece) Dimitris Katsivelis
2025–2026	(Greece) Theodoros Zaras
2026–present	(Greece) Nikos Persidis

== Head coaches ==
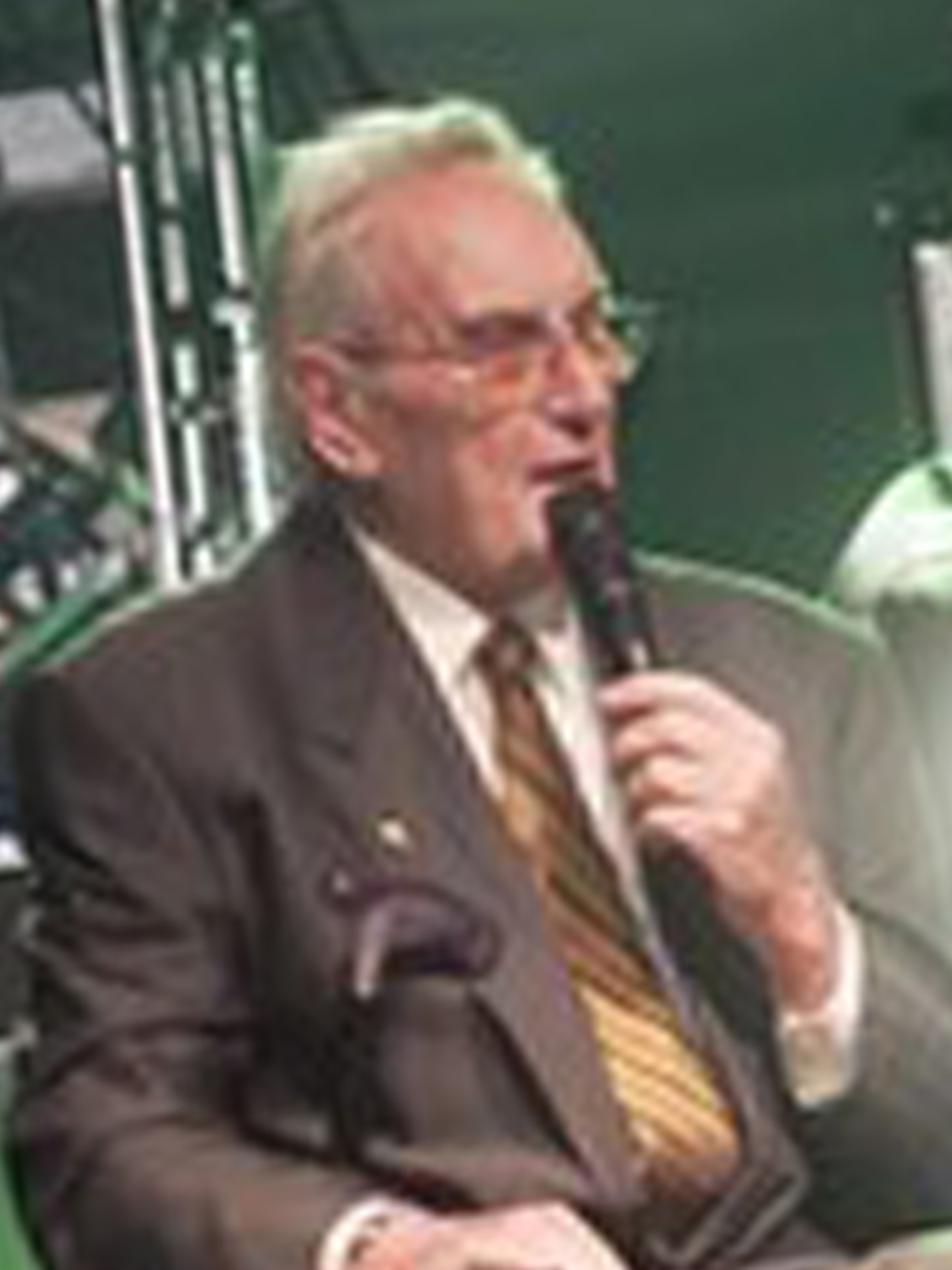
Faidon Matthaiou

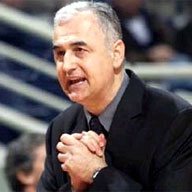
Dragan Šakota

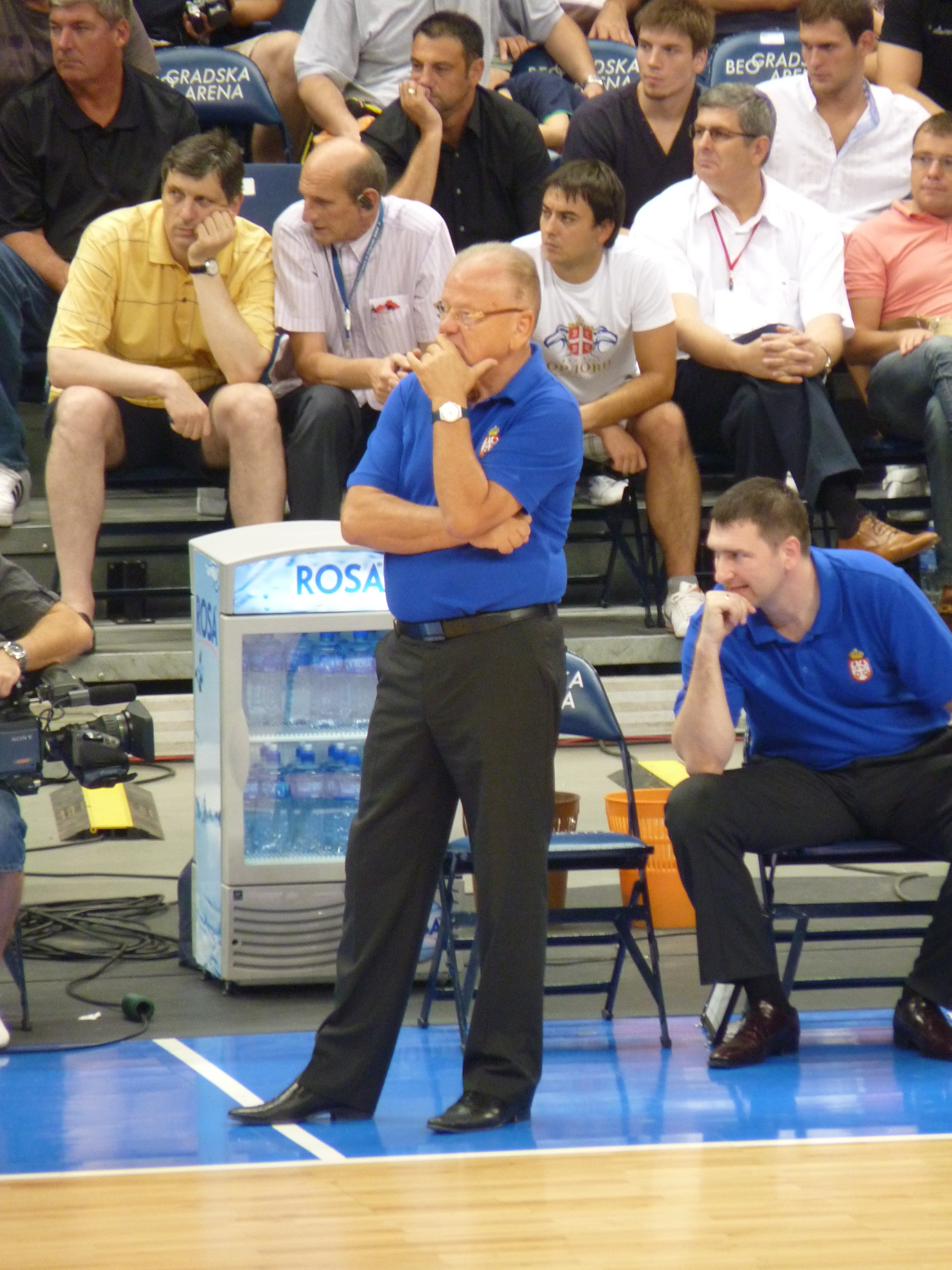
Dušan Ivković

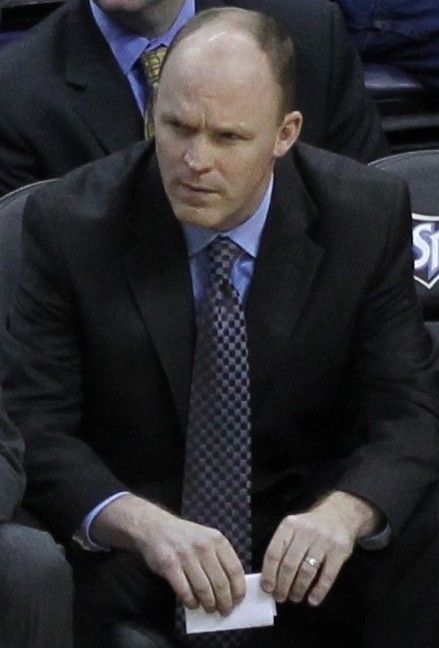
Scott Skiles

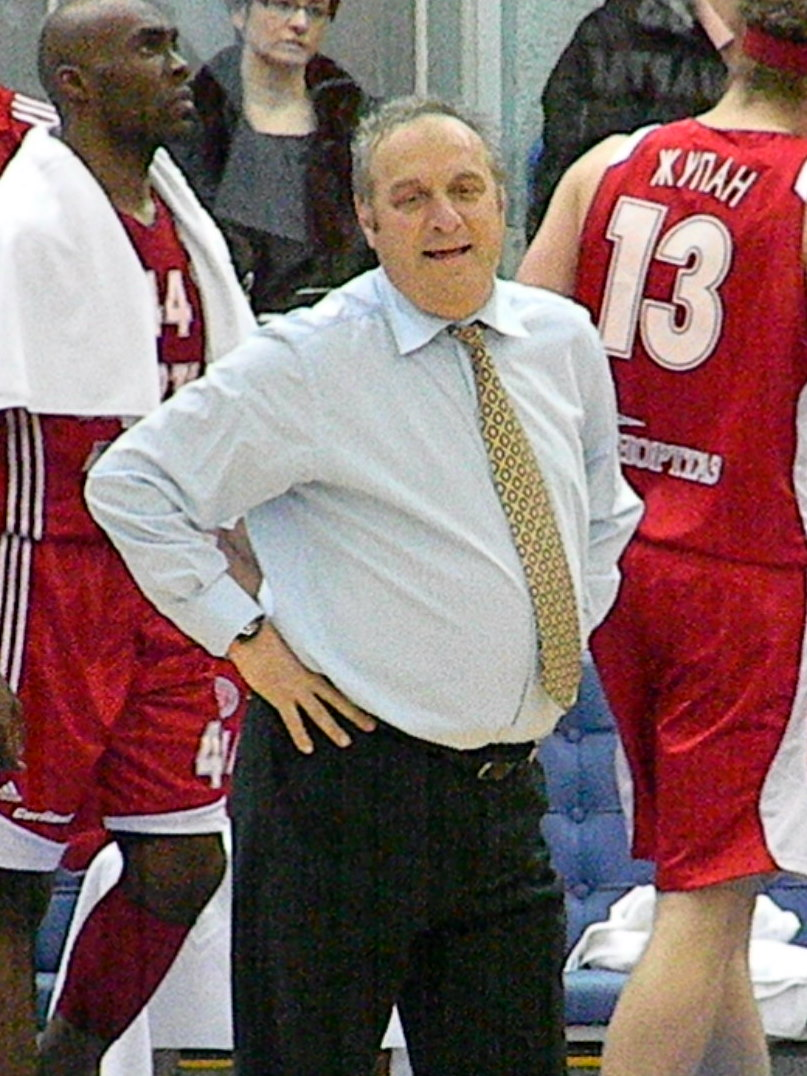
Zvi Sherf

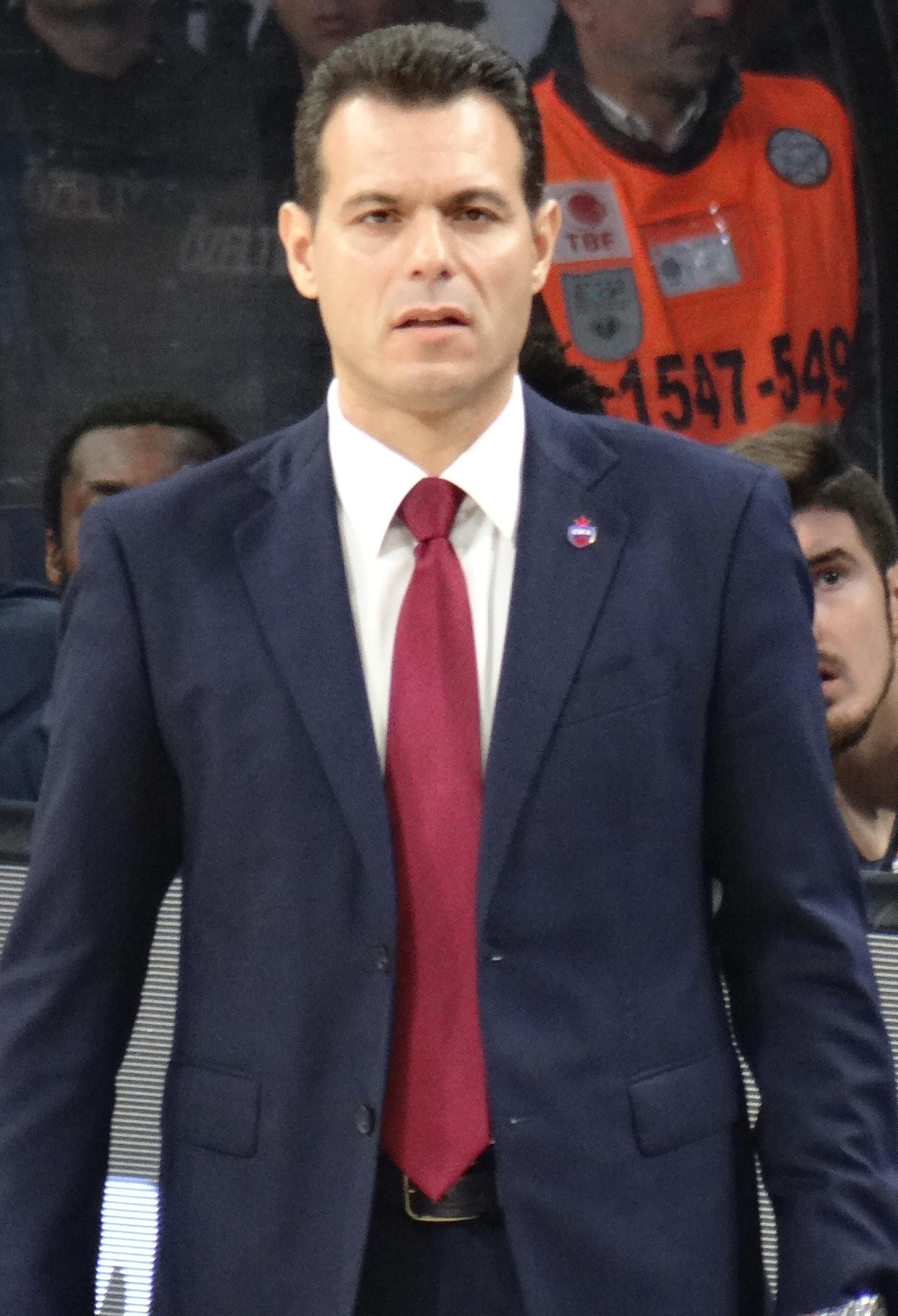
Dimitris Itoudis

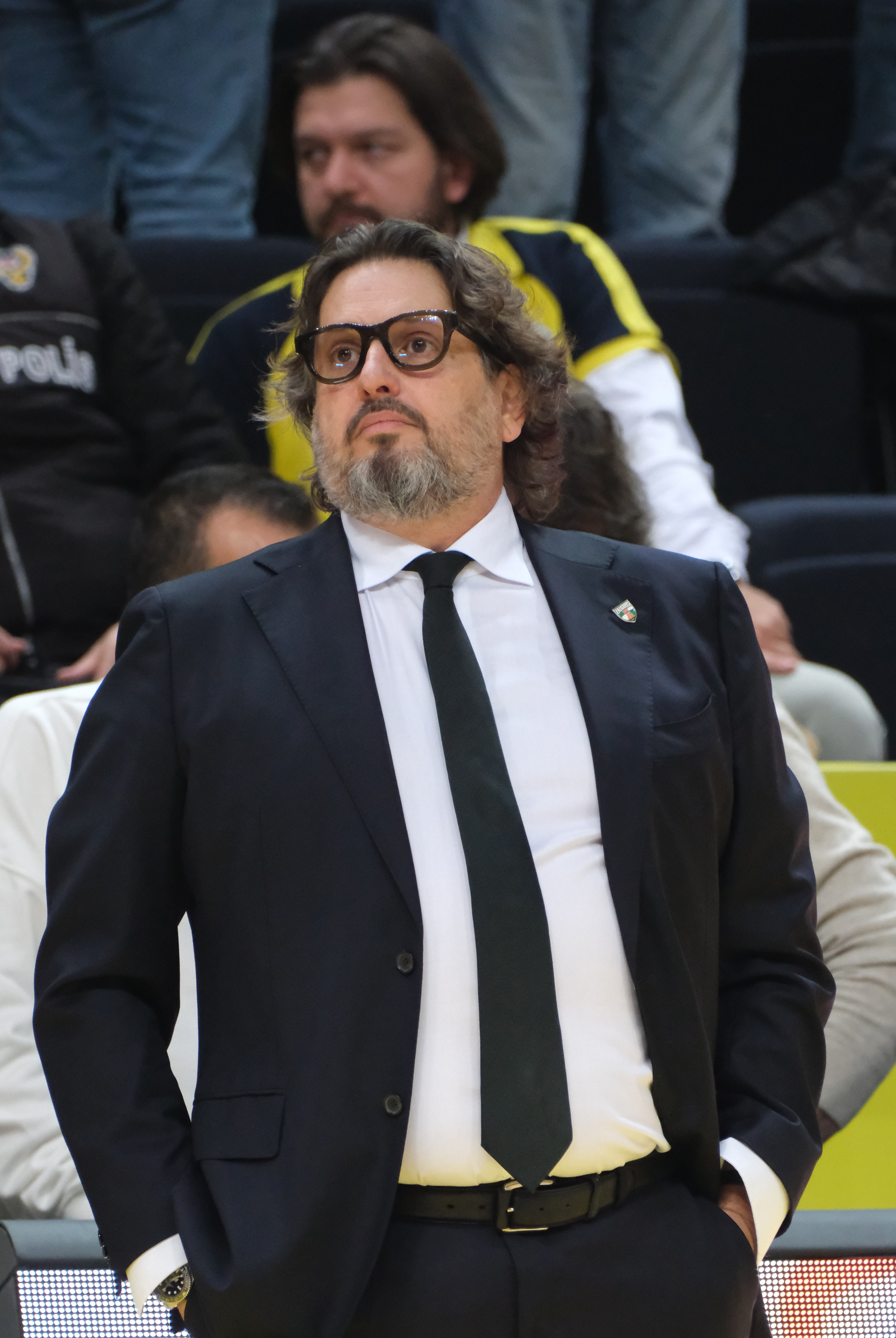
Andrea Trinchieri

This is a list of P.A.O.K. B.C. head coaches since the 1957–58 season:

Seasons	Head coach
1957–59	(Greece) Irakleios Klagkas
1967–68	(Greece) Orestis Angelidis
1970–71	(Greece) Giorgos Oikonomou (Greece) Orestis Angelidis
1971–72	(Greece) Giorgos Oikonomou
1972–73	(Greece) Orestis Angelidis
1978–80	(Greece) Apostolos Tsavas
1980–83	(Greece) Theodoros Rodopoulos
1983–84	(Greece) - (United States) Harry Pappas (Greece) Faidon Matthaiou
1984–85	(Socialist Federal Republic of Yugoslavia) Josip Gjergja
1985–86	(Greece) Theodoros Rodopoulos
1986–87	(Greece) Orestis Angelidis
1987–88	(United States) Johnny Neumann
1988–89	(United States) Johnny Neumann (Greece) Kostas Politis
1989–90	(Greece) Kostas Politis
1990–91	(Greece) Kostas Politis (Greece) Sakis Laios (Socialist Federal Republic of Yugoslavia) - (Greece) Dragan Šakota
1991–93	(Federal Republic of Yugoslavia) Dušan Ivković
1993–94	(Federal Republic of Yugoslavia) Dušan Ivković (Greece) Soulis Markopoulos
1994–95	(Federal Republic of Yugoslavia) Dragan Šakota (Greece) Sakis Laios (Greece) Vangelis Alexandris
1995–96	(Greece) Vangelis Alexandris (Greece) Efthimis Kioumourtzoglou (Federal Republic of Yugoslavia) Željko Lukajić (Greece) Dimitris Itoudis
1996–97	(France) Michel Gomez (United States) Scott Skiles
1997–98	(Israel) Zvi Sherf
1998–99	(Israel) Zvi Sherf (Greece) Kostas Flevarakis

Seasons	Head coach
1999–00	(Croatia) Petar Skansi (Greece) Kostas Flevarakis
2000–01	(Greece) Kostas Flevarakis (Greece) Ioannis Sfairopoulos
2001–02	(Slovenia) - (Greece) Lefteris Subotić (Greece) Vangelis Alexandris
2002–05	(Serbia and Montenegro) - (Greece) Bane Prelević
2005–06	(Serbia and Montenegro) - (Greece) Bane Prelević (Greece) Soulis Markopoulos
2006–07	(Greece) Kostas Pilafidis (Greece) Vangelis Alexandris
2007–08	(United States) Tab Baldwin (Greece) Kostas Flevarakis (Greece) - (United States) Jon Korfas
2008–09	(Greece) Argyris Pedoulakis (Greece) Georgios Kalafatakis
2009–17	(Greece) Soulis Markopoulos
2017–19	(Greece) Ilias Papatheodorou
2019–20	(Greece) Kostas Flevarakis (Greece) Kostas Charalampidis (Greece) Kostas Mexas
2020–21	(Greece) Kostas Mexas (Greece) Aris Lykogiannis
2021–22	(Greece) Aris Lykogiannis
2022–23	(Greece) Aris Lykogiannis (Greece) Fotis Takianos
2023–24	(Greece) Fotis Takianos (Greece) Stathis Neratzakis
2024–25	(Italy) Massimo Cancellieri
2025–26	(Slovenia) Jurij Zdovc (Greece) Pantelis Boutskos
2026–present	(Italy) Andrea Trinchieri

== Presidential history ==
Since 1928, the president of A.C. PAOK was responsible for the management of the basketball team. In 1992, the basketball department became professional, with its own president.

Year	President
1928–1929	(Greece) Konstantinos Meletiou
1929–1930	(Greece) Athinodoros Athinodorou
1930–1931	(Greece) Pantelis Kalpaktsoglou
1931–1933	(Greece) Petros Levantis
1933–1935	(Greece) Savvas Tsantas
1935–1936	(Greece) Filaretos Tsompektsoglou
1936–1938	(Greece) Savvas Tsantas
1938–1939	(Greece) Ioannis Tsakiroglou
1939–1940	(Greece) Dimitrios Kamaras
1940–1944	(Greece) Pantelis Kalpaktsoglou
1944–1946	(Greece) Filaretos Tsompektsoglou
1946–1948	(Greece) Pantelis Kalpaktsoglou
1948–1949	(Greece) Mirodis Dimitrakopoulos
1949–1963	(Greece) Georgios Charalampidis
1963–1964	(Greece) Ippokratis Iordanoglou
1964–1966	(Greece) Dimitrios Dimadis
1966–1969	(Greece) Vassilios Zervas
1969	(Greece) Evangelos Mylonas
1969–1971	(Greece) Stavros Georgiadis
1971–1972	(Greece) Ioannis Arvanitakis
1972–1973	(Greece) Stavros Simitzis
1973–1974	(Greece) Ioannis Arvanitakis

Year	President
1974	(Greece) Georgios Zografos
1974–1975	(Greece) Arthouros Merdikian
1975–1981	(Greece) Georgios Pantelakis
1981–1983	(Greece) Ioannis Vranialis
1983–1984	(Greece) Dimosthenis Fintanidis
1984–1993	(Greece) Nikolaos Vezyrtzis
1993–1995	(Greece) Apostolos Oikonomidis
1995–1999	(Greece) Apostolos Alexopoulos
1999–2000	(Greece) Aristeidis Kanavis (Greece) Athanasios Akrivopoulos
2000–2002	(Greece) Vasilios Oikonomidis
2002–2004	(Greece) Athanasios Katsaris
2004–2008	(Greece) Dimitrios Paneloudis
2008–2009	(Greece) Dimitrios Drosos
2009–2011	(Greece) Miltiadis Kanotas
2011–2019	(Serbia) (Greece) Branislav Prelević
2019–2021	(Greece) Aristeidis Karakousis
2021–2025	(Greece) Athanasios Chatzopoulos
2025–2026	(Greece) Nikolaos Vezyrtzis
2026–present	(Greece) Ioannis Petmezas

== Coaching and supporting staff ==
Position	Staff
Basketball Operations
General Manager	(Greece) Georgios Tsiaras
Team Manager	(Greece) Michalis Giannakidis
Coaching Staff
Head Coach	(Italy) Andrea Trinchieri
Assistant Coaches	(Italy) Massimiliano Menetti (Greece) Georgios Dedas (Greece) Charalampos Karaiskos (Georgia (country)) Andrew Antelidze (Greece) Stavros Chatzipetrou
Players Development Coach	(Greece) Vangelis Margaritis
Strength & Conditioning Coach	(Serbia) Luka Nastov
Assistant Strength Coach	(Greece) Alexis Papachristou
Medical Staff
Team Doctor	(Greece) Michail Samaras
Head Physiotherapist	(Greece) Dimitrios Aftosmidis
Physiotherapist	(Greece) Emmanouil Souanidis
Assistant Physiotherapist	(Greece) Polykarpos Arvanitidis
Supporting Staff
Nutritionist	(Greece) Akis Chatzistavridis
Equipment Manager	(Greece) Giorgos Strifon

== Management ==
Alpha Sports Group Single Member S.A., owned by Aristotelis Mistakidis (60.81%)

On 17 December 2025, businessman Aristotelis Mistakidis, through Alpha Sports Group Single Member S.A., acquired a controlling 60.81% stake in PAOK B.C. The company purchased shares previously held by PAOK B.C. president Thanasis Hatzopoulos (31.61%), Vangelis Galatsopoulos (23.77%) and Ilias Violidis (5.43%). Mistakidis is a prominent metals trader, has been a major shareholder of Piraeus Bank since 2021, and is the controlling shareholder of Aegean Baltic Bank.

=== Management members ===
Last updated: 7 July 2026

Position	Management members
Ownership	(Greece) Aristotelis Mistakidis
President and CEO	(Greece) Ioannis Petmezas
Deputy president	(Greece) Nikolaos Papadopoulos
Member of the board	(Greece) Panagiotis Zambitis
Member of the board	(Greece) Dimitrios Patridas
Member of the board	(Greece) Evangelos Tsakmakas
Communication and press officer	(Greece) Panagiotis Horozoglou

== Sponsorships ==
Last updated: 14 November 2026

In June 2026, PAOK introduced the PAOK BC Strategic Partnership Platform, a tiered commercial partnership framework focused on partner visibility, fan engagement, brand activations and hospitality.

- Main Partners: Stoiximan, KRAFT Paints, More.com
- Official Partners: FlexCar, Porcelana, AMINO ANIMO, PepsiCo, efood, ANAKEM, DIOS, GIANNIRIS Automobility, Seneca Medical Group
- Official Sportswear Supplier: Macron
- Official Retail Partners: SLAMDUNK

== See also ==
- P.A.O.K. women's basketball

== Sources ==
- ESAKE official website (in Greek)
- Eurobasket PAOK BC page
- Galanis Sports Data
