= Christos Manthopoulos =

Greek basketball player

Machites Doxas Pefkon
- Position: Power forward
- League: Elite League

Personal information
- Born: 29 July 2006 (age 20) Larissa, Greece
- Listed height: 2.03 m (6 ft 8 in)
- Listed weight: 94 kg (207 lb)

Career information
- Playing career: 2024–present

Career history
- 2024–present: PAOK Thessaloniki
- 2024–2025: → KAOX
- 2025–2026: → Panorama A.S.
- 2026–present: → Machites Doxas Pefkon

Christos Manthopoulos (Greek: Χρήστος Μανθόπουλος; born 29 July 2006) is a Greek professional basketball player for Machites Doxas Pefkon B.C. of the Elite League, playing under a dual-registration arrangement with PAOK Thessaloniki. Standing at 2.03 m, he plays at the power forward position. He signed his first professional contract with PAOK in 2024 and subsequently spent time with KAOX and Panorama A.S. before joining Machites for the 2026–27 season.

== Early career ==
Manthopoulos was born on 29 July 2006. He began playing basketball in the youth academy of Mytikas Larissa. In 2016, he moved with his family to Romania, where he played in the youth system of Petrolul Ploiești until 2023. Following his return to Greece, he joined the youth team of PAOK for the 2023–24 season.

In July 2024, he won the World School Basketball Championship in Macau as a member of the Hellenic College of Thessaloniki team.

== Professional career ==
=== PAOK Thessaloniki ===
On 29 July 2024, his 18th birthday, Manthopoulos signed his first professional contract with PAOK. The agreement was for four years, keeping him under contract with the club through 2028.

He made his professional debut for PAOK in a European competition game against Hungarian club Szolnoki Olajbányász.

=== KAOX and Panorama ===
On 17 December 2024, PAOK announced that Manthopoulos would join KAOX on loan for the remainder of the 2024–25 season in order to gain more playing time and experience in Greece's national basketball leagues.

During the 2025–26 season, Manthopoulos remained under contract with PAOK while playing for Panorama A.S. under a dual-registration arrangement. He also appeared for Panorama in the Greek Basketball Cup, recording nine points, 12 rebounds, two assists, one steal and two blocks in a game against Eleftheroupoli on 13 September 2025.

=== Machites Doxas Pefkon B.C. ===
On 16 September 2026, Machites Doxas Pefkon B.C. announced the acquisition of Manthopoulos for the 2026–27 Elite League season under a dual-registration agreement with PAOK. The arrangement allowed him to continue his development while remaining under contract with PAOK.

Prior to the move, Manthopoulos had participated in PAOK's preseason preparations under head coach Andrea Trinchieri, including the team's early friendly games.

== National team career ==
Manthopoulos has represented Greece at youth international level, including with the Greek under-18 national team. He was listed as a power forward on Greece's roster for the Albert Schweitzer Tournament.

== Personal life ==
Manthopoulos is the son of the Greek actors Aias Manthopoulos (1962–2023) and Stella Tsiatsiou. His sister, Lida-Maria Manthopoulou, is a Greek Paralympic athlete who won a silver medal in the women's 100 metres T38 event at the 2024 Summer Paralympics. In October 2024, the siblings participated in a joint interview with the Hellenic Basketball Federation's official magazine, discussing their sporting careers and family background.
