= Dimitris Karamanolis =

Greek basketball player

Dimitris Karamanolis Δημήτρης Καραμανώλης
Free agent
- Position: Shooting guard / small forward

Personal information
- Born: August 23, 1998 (age 28) Volos, Greece
- Listed height: 6 ft 6 in (1.98 m)
- Listed weight: 200 lb (91 kg)

Career information
- Playing career: 2016–present

Career history
- 2016–2020: PAOK Thessaloniki
- 2018–2019: → Kastoria

Dimitris Karamanolis (alternate spelling: Dimitrios) (Greek: Δημήτρης Καραμανώλης; born August 23, 1998) is a Greek professional basketball player who last played for PAOK of the Greek Basket League. He is a 1.98 metres (6 feet 6 inches) tall shooting guard-small forward.

== Professional career ==
After playing with the junior youth clubs of PAOK Thessaloniki for 5 years, Karamanolis started his pro career with the senior men's team of PAOK, in the summer of 2016, after he signed a 4-year contract with the club. On September 12, 2018, Karamanolis was loaned to Kastoria for the 2018–19 season. Dmitri's free agency is speculated and hasn't been active since 2021.

== Personal ==
Karamanolis' father, Apostolos Karamanolis, is a basketball coach, and he played professional basketball with the Greek Basket League club Panionios, in the 1980s. Moreover, his uncle, Theodoros Karamanolis, played in 141 games in the Greek League, with Panionios and Dafni.
