= Stathis Neratzakis =

Greek basketball coach

Stathis Nerantzakis
Al Rayyan
- Position: Head coach
- League: Qatari Basketball League

Personal information
- Born: 11 May 1977 (age 49) Thessaloniki, Greece
- Coaching career: 1996–present

Career history

Coaching
- 1996–2004: P.K. Neapolis (youth)
- 2007–2010: Diagoras Rhodes (youth)
- 2010–2019: Kolossos Rodou (assistant)
- 2019: Larissa (assistant)
- 2019–2024: PAOK (assistant)
- 2020: PAOK (interim)
- 2024: PAOK
- 2024–present: Al Rayyan

Career highlights
- Amir Cup champion (2025); Qatar Basketball Super Cup champion (2025)

Stathis Nerantzakis (Greek: Στάθης Νεραντζάκης; born 11 May 1977) is a Greek professional basketball coach who is the head coach of Al Rayyan of the Qatari Basketball League. He previously spent five seasons with PAOK, initially as an assistant coach before becoming the club's head coach in 2024.

In 2024, Nerantzakis moved to Qatar to take charge of Al Rayyan. He subsequently led the club to the Amir Cup title in 2025 and the inaugural Qatar Basketball Super Cup later that year.

== Early life and playing career ==
Nerantzakis was born in Thessaloniki on 11 May 1977. He graduated from the School of Physical Education and Sports Science of the Aristotle University of Thessaloniki.

He began playing basketball in the youth system of P.K. Neapolis and later played for Ermis Lagkada, YMCA Thessaloniki and Diagoras Rhodes. While still playing, he also began coaching, working with the youth teams of P.K. Neapolis from 1996 to 2004. He later coached in the youth system of Diagoras Rhodes between 2007 and 2010.

== Coaching career ==
=== Kolossos Rodou and Larissa ===
In 2010, Nerantzakis joined the coaching staff of Kolossos Rodou, where he remained until 2019. He spent nearly a decade with the Rhodes-based club before leaving in 2019.

At the beginning of the 2019–20 season, Nerantzakis had a brief spell as a member of the coaching staff of Larissa.

=== PAOK ===
On 18 November 2019, Nerantzakis joined PAOK as an assistant coach to Kostas Charalampidis, alongside Charalampos Karaiskos.

Following Charalambidis' resignation in February 2020, Nerantzakis temporarily assumed responsibility for the first team. FIBA confirmed that he would coach PAOK in its Basketball Champions League game against Telekom Baskets Bonn. PAOK defeated Bonn 103–84 under Nerantzakis on 4 February 2020 in the final group-stage game of its 2019–20 Basketball Champions League campaign.

He subsequently returned to his role as an assistant coach and remained on PAOK's coaching staff. In July 2020, the club confirmed that Nerantzakis and Karaiskos would continue as assistants to Kostas Mexas.

On 17 February 2024, following the departure of Fotis Takianos, PAOK appointed Nerantzakis as head coach until the end of the 2023–24 season. His promotion from the assistant coaching staff to the head coaching position was also reported by Greek sports media.

During Nerantzakis' tenure as head coach, PAOK signed former NBA guard Kevin Porter Jr. for the remainder of the 2023–24 season in April 2024.

Nerantzakis coached PAOK for the remainder of the Greek league season, including the club's playoff series against Panathinaikos.

Nerantzakis left PAOK in June 2024 after five years with the club, following the appointment of Massimo Cancellieri as head coach for the following season.

=== Al Rayyan ===
In July 2024, Nerantzakis agreed to become the head coach of Qatari club Al Rayyan, succeeding fellow Greek coach Stergios Koufos. Reports at the time stated that his initial agreement with the club was for one season. Nerantzakis later said that after leaving PAOK he had decided that he wanted to work abroad and viewed Qatar as an opportunity to experience a developing basketball market.

In his first season with the club, Nerantzakis guided Al Rayyan to the 2024–25 Amir Cup title. Al Rayyan defeated Al Arabi 77–70 in the final, winning the competition for the tenth time in the club's history.

In October 2025, Al Rayyan won the inaugural Qatar Basketball Super Cup. The team defeated Al Ahli 101–74 in the semifinal before beating Al Sadd 97–72 in the final at the Lusail Multipurpose Indoor Arena. Nerantzakis subsequently discussed the title and his experience coaching in Qatar in an interview with ERT Sports.

On 20 August 2026, Nerantzakis renewed his contract with Al Rayyan, continuing as the club's head coach for the 2026–27 season.

== Honours ==
Al Rayyan

- Amir Cup: 2024–25
- Qatar Basketball Super Cup: 2025
