= 2015–16 Aris Thessaloniki B.C. season =

Aris Thessaloniki B.C.
2015–16 season
- Head coach: Dimitrios Priftis
- Basket League: 4th (3rd in Regular season)
- Greek Cup: Semifinals
- EuroCup: Last 32

In the 2015–16 Aris Thessaloniki B.C. season, Aris Thessaloniki finished in the 3rd place of regular season of the Greek Basket League, and then lost to Panathinaikos during the playoff semifinals, with a 3–2 series score. Then the club faced AEK Athens for the playoff's 3rd place, where they lost the series 3–1, and finally finished in fourth place.

Aris Thessaloniki was eliminated by Panathinaikos with in Semifinals of the Greek Basketball Cup.

In the EuroCup, Aris was eliminated in the Last 32. The club was unbeaten in every home game at Nick Galis Hall.

== First-team squad ==
#	Position	Player	Height	Born
4	PG	(Greece) Vassilis Xanthopoulos	1.88 m (6 ft 2 in)	April 29, 1984
5	SG/SF	(Greece) Tasos Dimas	1.98 m (6 ft 6 in)	April 10, 1988
7	SF	(Greece) Michalis Pelekanos	1.98 m (6 ft 6 in)	May 25, 1981
8	PF	(Serbia) Slaven Čupković	2.07 m (6 ft 9 in)	June 23, 1988
9	PG/SG	(Greece) Dimitris Flionis	1.90 m (6 ft 2.75 in)	April 8, 1997
10	PF	(United States) Okaro White	2.03 m (6 ft 8 in)	August 13, 1992
11	PG	(United States) Dominic Waters	1.85 m (6 ft 1 in)	September 28, 1986
12	PG/SG	(Greece) Nikos Diplaros	1.90 m (6 ft 2.75 in)	June 28, 1997
13	SG/SF	(Greece) Theodoros Zaras	1.97 m (6 ft 5.75 in)	August 12, 1987
14	C/PF	(United States) Jamelle Hagins	2.06 m (6 ft 9 in)	October 19, 1990
15	PF/C	(Israel) Jake Cohen	2.10 m (6 ft 10.75 in)	September 25, 1990
16	SG/SF	(Greece) Spyros Mourtos	1.98 m (6 ft 6 in)	December 5, 1990
17	PF/C	(Greece) Vassilis Symtsak	2.07 m (6 ft 9.5 in)	March 3, 1981
22	PG/SG	(United States) Jerel McNeal	1.91 m (6 ft 3 in)	June 1, 1987

== Competitions ==
=== Overall ===
Competition	Started round	Current position / round	Final position / round	First match	Last match
Greek Basket League (Regular Season)	Matchday 1	—	3rd	11 October 2015	9 April 2016
Greek Basket League (Playoffs)	Quarter-finals	—	4th	16 April 2016	28 May 2016
Greek Basketball Cup	Quarterfinals	—	Semifinals	7 October 2015	28 December 2015
EuroCup	First qualifying round	—	Last 32	14 October 2015	10 February 2016

Updated to match played 28 May 2016
Source: Competitions

=== Overview ===
Competition	Record							
Competition	Pld	W	D	L	PF	PA	PD	Win %
Greek Basket League (Regular Season)	26	20	0	6	2,010	1,761	+249	76.92
Greek Basket League (Playoffs)	11	5	0	6	832	848	−16	45.45
Greek Basketball Cup	2	1	0	1	133	151	−18	50.00
EuroCup	16	10	0	6	1,160	1,139	+21	62.50
Total	55	36	0	19	4,135	3,899	+236	65.45

Last updated: 28 May 2016
Source: Competitions

=== Greek Basket League ===
==== Regular season ====
===== Standings =====
Pos	Team	Pld	W	L	PF	PA	PD	Pts	Qualification or relegation
1	Olympiacos	26	25	1	2235	1688	+547	51	Qualification to Playoffs
2	Panathinaikos	26	25	1	2135	1770	+365	51	Qualification to Playoffs
3	Aris Thessaliniki	26	20	6	2010	1761	+249	46	Qualification to Playoffs
4	AEK Athens	26	18	8	2010	1834	+176	44	Qualification to Playoffs
5	PAOK	26	13	13	1956	1924	+32	39	Qualification to Playoffs
6	Nea Kifissia	26	12	14	1964	1998	−34	38	Qualification to Playoffs
7	Kolossos H Hotels	26	11	15	1918	1990	−72	37	Qualification to Playoffs
8	Rethymno Cretan Kings	26	10	16	1953	2098	−145	36	Qualification to Playoffs
9	Trikala Aries	26	9	17	1938	2061	−123	35	
10	Apollon Patras Carna	26	9	17	1797	1952	−155	35	
11	Lavrio DHI	26	9	17	1895	2027	−132	35	
12	Koroivos	26	8	18	1809	1991	−182	34	
13	Arkadikos	26	8	18	1785	2032	−247	34	Relegation to Greek A2 League
14	Union Kavala	26	5	21	1830	2109	−279	31	Relegation to Greek A2 League

Updated to match(es) played on 9 April 2016. Source: ESAKE

===== Matches =====
11 October 2015 1	Aris Thessaloniki	70–76	Panathinaikos	Thessaloniki
17:00	Scoring by quarter: 24–18, 15–17, 12–19, 19–22
	Pts: Dominic Waters 14; Rebs: (3 players) 5 Asts: Dominic Waters 4		Pts: James Gist 17; Rebs: Antonis Fotsis 9 Asts: Dimitris Diamantidis 8	Arena: Nick Galis Hall

17 October 2015 2	Arkadikos	50–90	Aris Thessaloniki	Tripoli
17:00	Scoring by quarter: 13–29, 15–23, 15–15, 7–23
	Pts: Todd Brown 16; Rebs: Askia Booker 5 Asts: Devon van Oostrum 4		Pts: Jamelle Hagins 18; Rebs: Spyros Mourtos 7 Asts: Vassilis Xanthopoulos 6	Arena: Tripoli Indoor Hall

24 October 2015 3	Aris Thessaloniki	84–72	PAOK	Thessaloniki
21:00	Scoring by quarter: 22–20, 19–19, 22–17, 21–16
	Pts: Okaro White 27; Rebs: Okaro White, Jamelle Hagins 11; Asts: Vassilis Xanthopoulos 9		Pts: Will Hatcher 19; Rebs: Kostas Vasileiadis 5 Asts: Will Hatcher, Milenko Tepić 3	Arena: Nick Galis Hall

31 October 2015 4	Lavrio B.C.	68–76	Aris Thessaloniki	Lavrio
17:00	Scoring by quarter: 19–14, 19–19, 19–23, 11–20
	Pts: Brandon Young 15; Rebs: Nikos Barlos 6 Asts: Sakis Giannakopoulos 4		Pts: Jerel McNeal 18; Rebs: (3 players) 6 Asts: Jerel McNeal 6	Arena: Lavrio Indoor Hall

7 November 2015 5	Aris Thessaloniki	84–79	Trikala Aries B.C.	Thessaloniki
17:00	Scoring by quarter: 21-20, 19-21, 20-15, 24-23
	Pts: Dominic Waters 20; Rebs: Jamelle Hagins 8 Asts: Jerel McNeal 5		Pts: Ovie Soko 20; Rebs: Gene Teague 9 Asts: (3 players) 2	Arena: Nick Galis Hall

14 November 2015 6	Koroivos B.C.	67–65	Aris Thessaloniki	Amaliada
17:00	Scoring by quarter: 23-22, 15-17, 6-17, 23-9
	Pts: Dwayne Davis 21; Rebs: Darrell Harris 8 Asts: Obie Trotter 4		Pts: Jerel McNeal 21; Rebs: Okaro White 8 Asts: Okaro White, Jamelle Hagins 3	Arena: Amaliada Indoor Hall

21 November 2015 7	Aris Thessaloniki	68–50	Union Kavala B.C.	Thessaloniki
17:00	Scoring by quarter: 17-17, 16-9, 17-11, 18-13
	Pts: Dominic Waters 15; Rebs: Jamelle Hagins 10; Asts: Dominic Waters 5		Pts: Russell Robinson 12; Rebs: Eloy Vargas 10; Asts: Rob Jones, Dimitris Kalaitzidis 3	Arena: Nick Galis Hall

28 November 2015 8	AEK B.C.	74–83	Aris Thessaloniki	Athens
17:00	Scoring by quarter: 20-22, 16-19, 17-27, 21-15
	Pts: Marc Antonio Carter 13; Rebs: Dimitrios Mavroeidis 7 Asts: D. J. Cooper 6		Pts: Okaro White 20; Rebs: Okaro White 7 Asts: (5 players) 3	Arena: Nikos Galis Olympic Indoor Hall

5 December 2015 9	Aris Thessaloniki	81–68	Nea Kifissia B.C.	Thessaloniki
17:00	Scoring by quarter: 18-15, 24-18, 19-24, 20-11
	Pts: Okaro White 19; Rebs: Jamelle Hagins 8 Asts: Vassilis Xanthopoulos 5		Pts: Robert Lowery 15; Rebs: Leonidas Kaselakis 8 Asts: Nikos Gikas 5	Arena: Nick Galis Hall

19 December 2015 10	Aris Thessaloniki	82–50	Apollon Patras B.C.	Thessaloniki
17:00	Scoring by quarter: 19-11, 16-15, 25-16, 22-8
	Pts: Okaro White 22; Rebs: Jamelle Hagins 8 Asts: Dominic Waters 6		Pts: Kevin Dillard 22; Rebs: Kevin Dillard 5 Asts: Kevin Dillard 6	Arena: Nick Galis Hall

24 December 2015 11	Olympiacos B.C.	76–64	Aris Thessaloniki	Piraeus
17:00	Scoring by quarter: 19-16, 15-21, 22-18, 20-9
	Pts: Vassilis Spanoulis 15; Rebs: Othello Hunter 9 Asts: Vassilis Spanoulis 5		Pts: Jamelle Hagins, Jerel McNeal 14; Rebs: Jamelle Hagins 9 Asts: Dominic Waters 5	Arena: Peace and Friendship Stadium

2 January 2016 12	Aris Thessaloniki	72–60	Rethymno Cretan Kings B.C.	Thessaloniki
17:00	Scoring by quarter: 14-16, 17-15, 23-13, 18-16
	Pts: Theodoros Zaras 25; Rebs: Jamelle Hagins 10; Asts: Dominic Waters 5		Pts: Ryan Harrow 16; Rebs: Roeland Schaftenaar 10; Asts: Ryan Harrow 3	Arena: Nick Galis Hall

9 January 2016 13	Kolossos Rodou B.C.	76–70	Aris Thessaloniki	Rhodes
17:00	Scoring by quarter: 20-18, 12-12, 21-12, 23-28
	Pts: Christos Saloustros 16; Rebs: Christos Saloustros 9 Asts: Trevor Releford 6		Pts: Jerel McNeal 20; Rebs: Okaro White 11; Asts: Dominic Waters 5	Arena: Venetokleio Indoor Hall

17 January 2016 14	Panathinaikos BC	80–89	Aris Thessaloniki	Athens
16:30	Scoring by quarter: 22-7, 27-14, 22-22, 9-16
	Pts: Vlado Janković 17; Rebs: Vlado Janković 8 Asts: James Feldeine, Dimitris Diamantidis 5		Pts: Dominic Waters 13; Rebs: Spyros Mourtos 6 Asts: Vassilis Xanthopoulos 3	Arena: Nikos Galis Olympic Indoor Hall

23 January 2016 15	Aris Thessaloniki	86–52	Arkadikos B.C.	Thessaloniki
17:00	Scoring by quarter: 26-14, 17-10, 25-15, 18-13
	Pts: Dominic Waters 17; Rebs: Okaro White, Jamelle Hagins 5 Asts: Vassilis Xanthopoulos 4		Pts: Vassilis Kavvadas 19; Rebs: Vassilis Kavvadas 7 Asts: Devon van Oostrum 5	Arena: Nick Galis Hall

31 January 2016 16	P.A.O.K. BC	69–77	Aris Thessaloniki	Thessaloniki
21:00	Scoring by quarter: 20-19, 19-14, 17-25, 13-19
	Pts: Will Hatcher 15; Rebs: Vangelis Margaritis 6 Asts: Vangelis Margaritis 4		Pts: Jerel McNeal 19; Rebs: Okaro White 8 Asts: Dominic Waters 5	Arena: P.A.O.K. Sports Arena

6 February 2016 17	Aris Thessaloniki	82–68	Lavrio B.C.	Thessaloniki
17:00	Scoring by quarter: 13-8, 26-25, 22-19, 21-16
	Pts: Okaro White 17; Rebs: Okaro White 8 Asts: Okaro White 5		Pts: Sakis Giannakopoulos 11; Rebs: (3 players) 5 Asts: Panagiotis Tsiros 4	Arena: Nick Galis Hall

13 February 2016 18	Trikala Aries B.C.	68–83	Aris Thessaloniki	Trikala
17:00	Scoring by quarter: 25-23, 10-24, 15-19, 18-17
	Pts: Paul Jones 17; Rebs: Brandon Brown 8 Asts: Hörður Vilhjálmsson 8		Pts: Okaro White 22; Rebs: Okaro White 10; Asts: (3 players) 5	Arena: Trikala Municipal Sports Hall

17 February 2016 19	Aris Thessaloniki	99–56	Koroivos B.C.	Thessaloniki
17:00	Scoring by quarter: 22-17, 29-15, 24-12, 24-12
	Pts: Jamelle Hagins 15; Rebs: Okaro White, Vassilis Symtsak 5 Asts: Vassilis Xanthopoulos 7		Pts: Obie Trotter 10; Rebs: Diamantis Slaftsakis 5 Asts: Obie Trotter 4	Arena: Nick Galis Hall

20 February 2016 20	Union Kavala B.C.	71–77	Aris Thessaloniki	Kavala
17:00	Scoring by quarter: 10-24, 19-20, 24-13, 18-20
	Pts: Lasan Kromah 19; Rebs: Leon Williams 16; Asts: Tyler Laser 5		Pts: Okaro White 17; Rebs: Okaro White 7 Asts: Dominic Waters 6	Arena: Kalamitsa Indoor Hall

28 February 2016 21	Aris Thessaloniki	77–76	AEK B.C.	Thessaloniki
17:00	Scoring by quarter: 16-18, 21-29, 13-13, 27-16
	Pts: Michalis Pelekanos 15; Rebs: Jake Cohen 7 Asts: Jerel McNeal 5		Pts: J'Covan Brown 14; Rebs: Dimitrios Mavroeidis 8 Asts: (6 players) 1	Arena: Nick Galis Hall

12 March 2016 22	Nea Kifissia B.C.	65–67	Aris Thessaloniki	Athens
16:15	Scoring by quarter: 20-15, 12-11, 15-24, 18-17
	Pts: Muhammad El-Amin 25; Rebs: Dustin Hogue 15; Asts: Dustin Hogue 3		Pts: Dominic Waters 17; Rebs: Okaro White, Jerel McNeal 7 Asts: Vassilis Xanthopoulos, Dominic Waters 3	Arena: Zirineio Indoor Hall

19 March 2016 23	Apollon Patras B.C.	65–73	Aris Thessaloniki	Patras
17:00	Scoring by quarter: 16-23, 12-12, 16-16, 21-22
	Pts: Devon Saddler 14; Rebs: Tony Woods 9 Asts: Dimitrios Verginis 5		Pts: Jerel McNeal 17; Rebs: Jake Cohen 12; Asts: Jerel McNeal 5	Arena: Apollon Patras Indoor Hall

28 March 2016 24	Aris Thessaloniki	vs.	Olympiacos B.C.	Thessaloniki
19:00
				Arena: Nick Galis Hall

2 April 2016 25	Rethymno Cretan Kings B.C.	vs.	Aris Thessaloniki	Rethymno
17:00
				Arena: Melina Merkouri Indoor Hall

9 April 2016 26	Aris Thessaloniki	vs.	Kolossos Rodou B.C.	Thessaloniki
17:00
				Arena: Nick Galis Hall

===== Results overview =====
Opposition	Home score	Away score	Double
AEK Athens	77-76	83-74	160-150
Apollon Patras Carna	82-50	73-65	155-115
Arkadikos	86-52	90-50	176-102
Kolossos H Hotels	83-68	70-76	153-144
Koroivos	99-56	65-67	164-123
Lavrio DHI	82-68	76-68	158-136
Nea Kifissia	81-68	67-65	148-133
Olympiacos	70-74	64-76	134-150
Panathinaikos Superfoods	70-76	56-80	126-156
PAOK	84-72	77-69	161-141
Rethymno Cretan Kings	72-60	88-83	160-143
Trikala Aries	84-79	83-68	167-147
Union Kavala	68-50	77-71	145-121

==== Playoffs ====
===== Quarterfinals =====
16 April 2016 Quarterfinals	Aris Thessaloniki	78–60 (Series: 1-0)	Nea Kifissia B.C.	Thessaloniki
18:00	Scoring by quarter: 13-20, 20-15, 19-13, 26-12
	Pts: Dominic Waters 18; Rebs: Vassilis Symtsak 10; Asts: Jerel McNeal 7		Pts: Dustin Hogue, Leonidas Kaselakis 14; Rebs: Dustin Hogue 8 Asts: Dimitrios Stamatis 4	Arena: Nick Galis Hall

23 April 2016 Quarterfinals	Nea Kifissia B.C.	103–108(OT) (Series: 0-2)	Aris Thessaloniki	Athens
18:30	Scoring by quarter: 28-22, 20-12, 17-27, 16-20, Overtime: 22-27
	Pts: Muhammad El-Amin 25; Rebs: Nikos Gikas 8 Asts: Leonidas Kaselakis 3		Pts: Dominic Waters 29; Rebs: Jake Cohen 11; Asts: Dominic Waters 9	Arena: Zirineio Indoor Hall

=== EuroCup ===
==== Regular season ====
===== Group table =====
Pos	Team	Pld	W	L	PF	PA	PD	Qualification
1	(Greece) Aris	10	7	3	731	701	+30	Advance to Last 32
2	(Russia) UNICS	10	7	3	800	722	+78	Advance to Last 32
3	(Turkey) Trabzonspor Medical Park	10	5	5	754	759	−5	Advance to Last 32
4	(Turkey) Banvit	10	5	5	770	757	+13	Advance to Last 32
5	(Montenegro) Budućnost VOLI	10	4	6	747	725	+22	
6	(Romania) Steaua CSM EximBank București	10	2	8	676	814	−138	

Source: Eurocup Basketball

==== Last 32 ====
===== Group table =====
Pos	Team	Pld	W	L	PF	PA	PD	Qualification
1	(Italy) EA7 Emporio Armani Milan	6	4	2	474	442	+32	Advance to Eighthfinals
2	(Germany) Alba Berlin	6	3	3	447	433	+14	Advance to Eighthfinals
3	(Greece) Aris	6	3	3	429	438	−9	
4	(Lithuania) Neptūnas	6	2	4	409	446	−37	

Source: Eurocup Basketball
