= Ionikos Nikaias B.C. in international competitions =

Ionikos Nikaias B.C. in international competitions is the history and statistics of Ionikos Nikaias B.C. in FIBA Europe and Euroleague Basketball Company European-wide professional club basketball competitions.

== European competitions ==
| Record | Round | Opponent club | | |
|---|---|---|---|---|
1979–80 FIBA Korać Cup 3rd–tier
| 1–1 | 1st round | (Switzerland) Nyon | 113–104 (h) | 83–95 (a) |
1984–85 FIBA Korać Cup 3rd–tier
| 0–2 | 1st round | (Israel) Hapoel Haifa | 74–77 (h) | 74–112 (a) |

== Game notes ==
=== FIBA Korać Cup (3rd-tier) ===
==== 1979–80 ====
| Year | Team | ________ Last 37 to 28 ________ | ________ Last 28 to 16 ________ | _________ Semifinals _________ | ____________ Final ____________ |
|---|---|---|---|---|---|
| 1979–80 | Ionikos Nikaias | (Switzerland) Nyon | | | |

- FIBA Korać Cup 1979–80: 31–10–1979, Platonas Gymnasium: Ionikos Nikaias vs. BBC Nyon 113–104 (44–42)

Ionikos Nikaias (coach: Kostas Anastasatos): Panagiotis Giannakis 32, Stathis Sarantaenas 22, Tasos Bezantakos 21, Kostas Petridis 7, Makis Katsafados 4, Theodoros Bolatoglou 8, Gourgiotis 7, Kostas Alexandridis 4, Bezantakos 8.
BBC Nyon (coach: Michel Favre): Orval Jordan 32, Kevin Goetz 26, Jean-Jacques Nussbaumer 17, Dominique Briachetti 4, Michel Girardet 21, Carlos Paredes 4.

- FIBA Korać Cup 1979–80: 7–11–1979, Salle du Rocher (500): BBC Nyon vs. Ionikos Nikaias 95–83 (52–39)

BBC Nyon (coach: Michel Favre): Orval Jordan 31, Kevin Goetz 28, Thierry Genoud, Jean-Jacques Nussbaumer 12, Dominique Briachetti 18, Michel Girardet 2, Carlos Paredes 4.
Ionikos Nikaias (coach: Kostas Anastasatos): Panagiotis Giannakis 42, Tasos Bezantakos 1, Theodoros Bolatoglou 7, Kostas Petridis 2, Bourgis, Gourgiotis 2, Spyros Benetatos 6, Stathis Sarantaenas 11, Makis Katsafados 12.

==== 1984–85 ====
| Year | Team | ________ Last 39 to 28 ________ | ________ Last 28 to 16 ________ | _________ Semifinals _________ | ____________ Final ____________ |
|---|---|---|---|---|---|
| 1984–85 | Ionikos Nikaias | (Israel) Hapoel Haifa | | | |

- FIBA Korać Cup 1984–85: 3–10–1984, Platonas Gymnasium: Ionikos Nikaias vs. Hapoel Haifa 74–77 (40–35)

Ionikos Nikaias: Kostas Alexandridis 24, Odysseas Antoniou 6, Angelidis 2, Kostas Petridis 7, Gourgiotis 3, Vangelis Pertesis 19, Georgios Kalafatakis 9, Tsikimis 4, Nydriotis.
Hapoel Haifa (coach: Roni Shiftan): Ronald Houston 25, Haim Zlotikman 22, Jonathan Dalzell 15, Barry Leibowitz 6, Itai Shavit 3, Alon Ofir 2, Motti Amisha 2, Doron Kaski 2.

- FIBA Korać Cup 1984–85: 10–10–1984, Romema Arena (500): Hapoel Haifa vs. Ionikos Nikaias 112–74 (58–38)

Hapoel Haifa (coach: Roni Shiftan): Ronald Houston 28, Haim Zlotikman 11, Jonathan Dalzell 21, Barry Leibowitz 4, Itai Shavit 12, Alon Ofir 12, Motti Amisha 2, Doron Kaski 18, Roni Haimowitz 2, David Ben-Elul 2.
Ionikos Nikaias : Bartimis 20, Kostas Alexandridis 15, Sardanis 11, Batridis 9, Tsikimis 7, Agladis 6, Aklapatigis 4, Fotis Katsikaris 2.

== See also ==
- Greek basketball clubs in international competitions
