= Charalampos Karaiskos =

Greek basketball coach (born 1992)

PAOK Thessaloniki
- Position: Assistant coach
- League: Greek Basketball League; EuroCup

Personal information
- Born: 10 February 1992 (age 34)
- Coaching career: 2013–present

Career history

Coaching
- 2013–2018: PAOK Junior Basketball Program
- 2016–present: PAOK Thessaloniki (assistant)

Career highlights
- Greek Cup runner-up (2019); 2× FIBA Europe Cup runner-up (2025, 2026)

Charalampos "Babis" Karaiskos (Greek: Χαράλαμπος «Μπάμπης» Καραΐσκος; born 10 February 1992) is a Greek professional basketball coach and former youth basketball player. He has been a member of the coaching staff of PAOK Thessaloniki's senior team since 2016, having previously worked in the club's youth development program.

== Playing career ==
Karaiskos began playing basketball with Keravnos Larissa. In 2005, he moved to Thessaloniki, where he continued his development with the basketball program of the Mandoulides Schools.

He also represented Greece at youth international level. Karaiskos played for the Greek under-16 national team at the 2008 FIBA Europe Under-16 Championship, appearing in seven games and averaging 5.7 points and 1.4 rebounds per game.

== Coaching career ==
=== PAOK youth program ===
Karaiskos began his coaching career in 2013, when he joined the coaching staff of the PAOK Junior Basketball Program. He worked with the club's youth teams until 2018.

By 2016, he was completing his studies at the Aristotle University of Thessaloniki's Department of Physical Education and Sport Science, with a specialization in basketball.

=== PAOK senior team ===
In June 2016, Karaiskos was promoted to the coaching staff of PAOK's senior team, joining head coach Soulis Markopoulos and assistants Pantelis Boutskos and Kostas Charalampidis. He subsequently remained within the club's coaching structure through several changes of head coach.

As a member of the coaching staff, Karaiskos participated in the 2018–19 Greek Basketball Cup Final, in which PAOK finished as runners-up.

In 2023, he was also selected as one of the coaches for The Trenches, an elite basketball training camp held in Athens that brought together coaches and player-development specialists from European basketball and the NBA. The coaching group included Phil Handy, Rico Hines, David Vanterpool and Karaiskos.

During the 2024–25 season, Karaiskos was part of Massimo Cancellieri's coaching staff as PAOK reached the 2024–25 FIBA Europe Cup Final, the club's first European final since 1996.

He remained on PAOK's staff during the following season, when the club reached the 2025–26 FIBA Europe Cup Final and again finished as runners-up to Bilbao Basket.
