= Georgios Kalafatakis =

Greek basketball player & coach (born 1958)

Georgios Kalafatakis Γιώργος Καλαφατάκης
Personal information
- Born: November 9, 1958 (age 68) Chania, Greece
- Position: Head coach
- Coaching career: 1984–present

Career history

Playing
- Ampelokipoi
- Ionikos Nikaias
- Apollon Nea Smyrni

Coaching
- 1984–1985: Ampelokipoi
- 1985–1987: Estia Filias
- 1987–1991: Ampelokipoi
- 1991–1992: Panelefsiniakos
- 1994–1995: Ampelokipoi
- 1995–1998: Irakleio
- 1998–1999: AEK
- 1999–2000: Dafni
- 2000–2001: Apollon Patras
- 2001–2002: Ionikos NF
- 2002–2004: Panionios
- 2005: Ilysiakos
- 2005–2006: Makedonikos
- 2006–2007: Panellinios
- 2008: AEL
- 2008–2009: PAOK
- 2009–2010: Olympia Larissa
- 2011: Iraklis Thessaloniki
- 2011–2013: KAOD
- 2013: Ikaros Chalkidas
- 2014: Rethymno
- 2015: Keravnos Strovolos
- 2016: Ethnikos Piraeus
- 2017: Panionios
- 2019: Ionikos Nikaias

Georgios Kalafatakis (alternate spelling: Giorgos) (born November 9, 1958; Greek: Γιώργος Καλαφατάκης) is a Greek professional basketball coach and a retired professional basketball player.

== Playing career ==
Kalafatakis played club basketball with the Greek clubs Ampelokipoi, Ionikos Nikaias, and Apollon Nea Smyrni. He became the first Greek player to ever make a 3 point shot in an official game, while he was a member of Ionikos Nikaias. He became the first Greek player to make a 3 pointer in an official game, in a 74–77 loss against the Israeli Super League club Hapoel Haifa, in a 1984–85 FIBA Korać Cup game.

== Coaching career ==
Kalafatakis began his coaching career in the 1984–85 season, in the Greek minors, with Ampelokipoi. He eventually led Ampelokipoi to be promoted to the top-tier level Greek Basket League, after five consecutive promotions. In 1995, he became the head coach of the Greek club Irakleio Crete.

In the 1998–99 season, he became Greek club AEK Athens' head coach, and with the club, he coached in the European-wide 2nd-tier level FIBA Saporta Cup. He also coached various other Greek clubs, some of which include: Apollon Patras, Panionios, Panellinios, where he coached in the 2nd-tier level EuroCup's 2007–08 season, PAOK, and Iraklis. He also coached the Cypriot club Keravnos Strovolos.

== Personal life ==
Kalafatakis is married to Renia Stavrakopoulou, who is the sister of the former Greek professional basketball player, Tzanis Stavrakopoulos. The couple's daughter, Angeliki, is a volleyball player.
