= Marinos Konstantis =

Greek–Serbian basketball player and coach

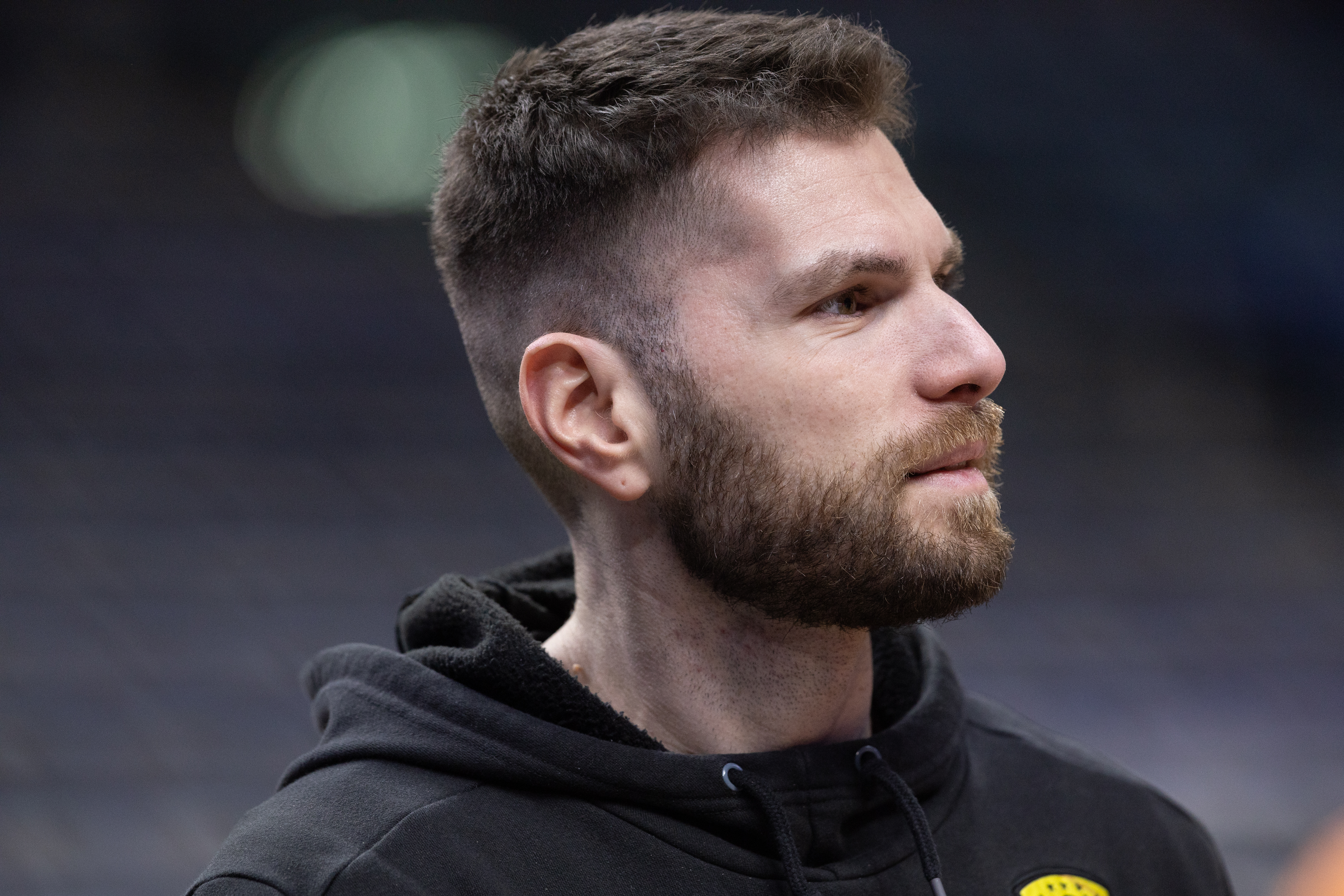
- Konstantis in 2026

AEK Athens
- Position: Assistant coach
- League: GBL

Personal information
- Born: 26 January 1994 (age 32) Athens, Greece
- Coaching career: 2015–present

Career history

Coaching
- 2015–2016: Ampelokipoi (assistant)
- 2016–2017: Ionikos Nikaias (cadets, juniors)
- 2017–2018: Evriali Glyfadas (assistant)
- 2018–2020: Olympiacos (cadets, juniors)
- 2019–2020: Aigaleo (assistant)
- 2020–2021: Proteas Voulas (assistant)
- 2021–2024: Papagou (assistant)
- 2024–present: AEK Athens (assistant)

Marinos Konstantis (born 26 January 1994) is a Greek professional basketball coach who is the assistant coach of AEK Athens.

== Coaching career ==
After being multiple years as an assistant coach for multiple teams of the Greek Elite League, Kostantis was appointed as the assistant coach of AEK Athens in 2024.
