= Panagiotis Tsiros =

Greek basketball player

Panagiotis Tsiros Παναγιώτης Τσίρος
OKAM Mesogeion
- Position: Point guard

Personal information
- Born: February 19, 1983 (age 43) Athens, Greece
- Listed height: 5 ft 11 in (1.80 m)
- Listed weight: 181 lb (82 kg)

Career information
- NBA draft: 2005: undrafted
- Playing career: 1994–present

Career history
- 1994–2010: Lavrio
- 2003–2004: → Markopoulo
- 2007–2008: → Markopoulo
- 2010–2011: Markopoulo
- 2011–2017: Lavrio
- 2017–present: OKAM Mesogeion

Panagiotis Tsiros (Greek: Παναγιώτης Τσίρος; born on February 19, 1983, in Athens, Greece) is a Greek professional basketball player. He is a 5-foot-11-inch (1.80 m) tall point guard.

== Professional career ==
Tsiros played amateur basket for Lavrio before starting his pro career with the club. During his first spell with the club, he had two loan spells to Markopoulo.

In 2010, he signed with Markopoulo as a Free agent.

In 2011 Tsiros returned to Lavrio. He is among with Michalis Perrakis and Dionysis Giannakopoulos one of the pillars of the club.
