= 2011–12 Euroleague Regular Season Group C =

Standings and Results for Group C of the Regular Season phase of the 2011–12 Euroleague basketball tournament.

== Standings ==
Key to colors
Top four places in each group advance to Top 16

	Team	Pld	W	L	PF	PA	Diff	Tie-break
1.	(Spain) Real Madrid	10	8	2	879	773	+106	
2.	(Israel) Maccabi Tel Aviv	10	7	3	790	732	+58	
3.	(Turkey) Anadolu Efes	10	5	5	721	751	−30	
4.	(Italy) EA7 Milano	10	4	6	738	734	+4	1–1 (+2)
5.	(Serbia) Partizan	10	4	6	739	774	−35	1–1 (–2)
6.	(Belgium) Spirou Charleroi	10	2	8	729	832	−103	

== Fixtures and results ==
All times given below are in Central European Time.

=== Game 1 ===
20 October 2011
19:00

Report

Partizan (Serbia)	73–84	(Turkey) Anadolu Efes
Scoring by quarter: 28–27, 17–21, 6–20, 22–16
Pts: Peković 21; Rebs: Mačvan 7 Asts: three players 3		Pts: Kinsey 18; Rebs: three players 4 Asts: Tunçeri 6

Pionir Hall, Belgrade
Attendance: 7,350
Referees: Guerrino Cerebuch (ITA), Vicente Bulto (ESP), Panagiotis Anastopoulos (GRE)

20 October 2011
20:30

Report

Spirou Charleroi (Belgium)	76–100	(Spain) Real Madrid
Scoring by quarter: 16–23, 21–22, 18–26, 21–29
Pts: Mallet 27; Rebs: Shengelia 9 Asts: Hamilton, Mallet 4		Pts: Fernández, Reyes 19; Rebs: Reyes 9 Asts: Rodríguez, Llull 9

Spiroudome, Charleroi
Attendance: 5,000
Referees: Recep Ankarali (TUR), Robert Lottermoser (GER), Jurgis Laurinavicius (LTU)

20 October 2011
20:45

Report

EA7 Milano (Italy)	89–82	(Israel) Maccabi Tel Aviv
Scoring by quarter: 14–19, 27–19, 24–14, 24–30
Pts: Hairston 25; Rebs: Bourousis 10; Asts: Hairston 6		Pts: Eliyahu 23; Rebs: Eliyahu 8 Asts: Papaloukas, Pnini 2

Mediolanum Forum, Milan
Attendance: 5,500
Referees: Dani Hierrezuelo (ESP), Eddie Viator (FRA), Boris Shulga (UKR)

=== Game 2 ===
26 October 2011
20:00

Report

Anadolu Efes (Turkey)	79–80	(Belgium) Spirou Charleroi
Scoring by quarter: 15–24, 17–14, 24–22, 23–20
Pts: İlyasova 21; Rebs: three players 6 Asts: Ilievski 8		Pts: Green 18; Rebs: Shengelia 8 Asts: Hamilton 7

Abdi Ipekci, Istanbul
Attendance: 3,450
Referees: Emilio Pérez Pizarro (ESP), Sergey Mikhaylov (RUS), Sergiy Zashchuck (UKR)

27 October 2011
20:45

Report

Real Madrid (Spain)	85–78	(Italy) EA7 Milano
Scoring by quarter: 14–18, 22–21, 27–23, 22–16
Pts: Carroll 21; Rebs: Reyes, Begić 7 Asts: Llull, Fernández 4		Pts: Nicholas 24; Rebs: Cook 6 Asts: Cook 5

Caja Mágica, Madrid
Attendance: 10,984
Referees: Carl Jungebrand (FIN), Olegs Latisevs (LAT), Luis Lopes (POR)

27 October 2011
21:00

Report

Maccabi Tel Aviv (Israel)	70–66	(Serbia) Partizan
Scoring by quarter: 19–12, 22–17, 15–11, 14–26
Pts: Papaloukas 13; Rebs: Farmar 6 Asts: Farmar 6		Pts: Milosavljević, Mačvan 14; Rebs: Peković 8 Asts: Law 4

Yad Eliyahu Arena, Tel Aviv
Attendance: 11,000
Referees: Spiros Geontas (GRE), Antonio Conde (ESP), Marius Ciulin (ROM)

=== Game 3 ===
3 November 2011
20:45

Report

Maccabi Tel Aviv (Israel)	88–82	(Spain) Real Madrid
Scoring by quarter: 21–21, 25–20, 28–21, 14–20
Pts: Farmar 27; Rebs: Smith 6 Asts: Farmar 5		Pts: Carroll 18; Rebs: Begić 9 Asts: Rodríguez 8

Yad Eliyahu Arena, Tel Aviv
Attendance: 10,728
Referees: Ilija Belosevic (SRB), Fernando Rocha (POR), Tasos Piloidis (GRE)

3 November 2011
20:45

Report

Partizan (Serbia)	91–81	(Belgium) Spirou Charleroi
Scoring by quarter: 22–17, 30–27, 21–26, 18–11
Pts: Law 26; Rebs: Mačvan 6 Asts: Law 7		Pts: Mallet 19; Rebs: Mallet 9 Asts: Hamilton 7

Pionir Hall, Belgrade
Attendance: 7,200
Referees: J.C. Garcia Gonzalez (ESP), Marek Cmikiewicz (POL), Elias Koromilas (GRE)

3 November 2011
20:45

Report

EA7 Milano (Italy)	54–62	(Turkey) Anadolu Efes
Scoring by quarter: 9–22, 12–11, 15–14, 18–15
Pts: Gallinari 12; Rebs: Bourousis 10; Asts: Cook 3		Pts: Barać 16; Rebs: İlyasova 9 Asts: Tunçeri 3

Mediolanum Forum, Milan
Attendance: 3,800
Referees: Jose Martín (ESP), Spiros Gkontas (GRE), Damir Javor (SVN)

=== Game 4 ===
10 November 2011
19:00

Report

Anadolu Efes (Turkey)	72–79	(Israel) Maccabi Tel Aviv
Scoring by quarter: 13–14, 22–24, 18–21, 19–20
Pts: Vujačić 21; Rebs: Savanović 7 Asts: Tunçeri 4		Pts: Farmar 18; Rebs: Burstein 7 Asts: Farmar 6

Sinan Erdem Dome, Istanbul
Attendance: 8,050
Referees: Sasa Pukl (SVN), Robert Lottermoser (GER), Elias Koromilas (GRE)

10 November 2011
20:30

Report

Spirou Charleroi (Belgium)	76–81	(Italy) EA7 Milano
Scoring by quarter: 11–14, 23–16, 24–23, 18–28
Pts: Mallet 21; Rebs: Green 8 Asts: Hamilton, Hill 3		Pts: Fotsis 19; Rebs: three players 4 Asts: Cook 6

Spiroudome, Charleroi
Attendance: 5,000
Referees: Vicente Bulto (ESP), Fernando Rocha (POR), Radomir Vojinovic (MNE)

10 November 2011
20:45

Report

Partizan (Serbia)	80–79	(Spain) Real Madrid
Scoring by quarter: 22–16, 23–24, 12–21, 23–18
Pts: Peković 20; Rebs: Mačvan 12; Asts: Law 5		Pts: Carroll 21; Rebs: Suárez 6 Asts: Llull 5

Pionir Hall, Belgrade
Attendance: 7,500
Referees: Christos Christodoulou (GRE), Boris Ryzhyk (UKR), Gianluca Mattioli (ITA)

=== Game 5 ===
17 November 2011
20:00

Report

Maccabi Tel Aviv (Israel)	69–59	(Belgium) Spirou Charleroi
Scoring by quarter: 22–11, 13–24, 15–19, 19–5
Pts: Eliyahu 15; Rebs: Ohayon 8 Asts: Ohayon 5		Pts: Mallet 18; Rebs: Hamilton 10; Asts: Green 3

Yad Eliyahu Arena, Tel Aviv
Attendance: 11,050
Referees: Paolo Taurino (ITA), Sinisa Herceg (CRO), Roberto Chiari (ITA)

17 November 2011
20:45

Report

Real Madrid (Spain)	104–84	(Turkey) Anadolu Efes
Scoring by quarter: 24–18, 26–18, 31–26, 23–22
Pts: Carroll 19; Rebs: Tomić 6 Asts: Rodríguez 10		Pts: Savanović, Kuqo 15; Rebs: Batista 7 Asts: Ilievski 4

Caja Mágica, Madrid
Attendance: 10,251
Referees: Luigi Lamonica (ITA), Matej Boltauzer (SLO), Petri Mäntylä (FIN)

17 November 2011
20:45

Report

EA7 Milano (Italy)	65–69	(Serbia) Partizan
Scoring by quarter: 12–14, 19–5, 25–20, 9–30
Pts: Gallinari 14; Rebs: Hairston 6 Asts: Cook 4		Pts: Mačvan 18; Rebs: Mačvan 11; Asts: Law 3

Mediolanum Forum, Milan
Attendance: 4,000
Referees: Emilio Perez Pizarro (ESP), Jakub Zamojski (POL), Tasos Piloidis (GRE)

=== Game 6 ===
23 November 2011
19:30

Report

Anadolu Efes (Turkey)	67–58	(Serbia) Partizan
Scoring by quarter: 15–17, 15–11, 19–8, 18–22
Pts: Vujačić 21; Rebs: İlyasova 7 Asts: Tunçeri 8		Pts: Mačvan 15; Rebs: Čakarević 6 Asts: Law, Milosavljević 3

Sinan Erdem Dome, Istanbul
Attendance: 11,200
Referees: J.C. Garcia Gonzalez (ESP), Paolo Taurino (ITA), Boris Shulga (UKR)

24 November 2011
19:00

Report

Real Madrid (Spain)	93–89	(Belgium) Spirou Charleroi
Scoring by quarter: 21–27, 27–19, 22–23, 23–20
Pts: Pocius 20; Rebs: Reyes, Ibaka 9 Asts: Rodríguez 9		Pts: Hill 18; Rebs: Beghin, Shengelia 5 Asts: Hamilton 5

Caja Mágica, Madrid
Attendance: 8,147
Referees: Sreten Radovic (CRO), Apostolos Kalpakas (SWE), Luis Lopes (POR)

24 November 2011
20:00

Report

Maccabi Tel Aviv (Israel)	85–76	(Italy) EA7 Milano
Scoring by quarter: 25–14, 27–24, 15–24, 18–14
Pts: Schortsanitis 28; Rebs: Farmar, Schortsanitis 6 Asts: Farmar, Ohayon 6		Pts: Gallinari 21; Rebs: Fotsis 9 Asts: Cook 8

Yad Eliyahu Arena, Tel Aviv
Attendance: 10,728
Referees: Christos Christodoulou (GRE), Matej Boltauzer (SVN), Oliver Krause (GER)

=== Game 7 ===
30 November 2011
20:30

Report

Spirou Charleroi (Belgium)	62–66	(Turkey) Anadolu Efes
Scoring by quarter: 14–18, 8–19, 21–15, 19–14
Pts: Mallet 21; Rebs: Riddick 10; Asts: Welsch 3		Pts: Savanović 16; Rebs: Savanović 10; Asts: Savanović 3

Spiroudome, Charleroi
Attendance: 5,000
Referees: Daniel Hierrezuelo (ESP), Tomas Jasevicius (LTU), Marko Juras (SRB)

1 December 2011
20:45

Report

EA7 Milano (Italy)	65–72	(Spain) Real Madrid
Scoring by quarter: 15–20, 15–16, 17–17, 18–19
Pts: Gallinari 13; Rebs: Bourousis 9 Asts: Nicholas 3		Pts: Rodríguez 19; Rebs: Mirotić 10; Asts: Fernández 3

Mediolanum Forum, Milan
Attendance: 8,200
Referees: Grzegorz Ziemblicki (POL), Milivoje Jovcic (SRB), Milija Vojinovic (SRB)

1 December 2011
20:45

Report

Partizan (Serbia)	74–71	(Israel) Maccabi Tel Aviv
Scoring by quarter: 24–17, 15–20, 15–11, 20–23
Pts: Mačvan 22; Rebs: Čakarević, Mačvan 8 Asts: Lučić, Božić 4		Pts: Smith 12; Rebs: Schortsanitis, Smith 5 Asts: Farmar, Ohayon 3

Pionir Hall, Belgrade
Attendance: 8,000
Referees: Carl Jungebrand (FIN), Boris Ryzhyk (UKR), Nicola Maestre (FRA)

=== Game 8 ===
7 December 2011
19:00

Report

Anadolu Efes (Turkey)	84–70	(Italy) EA7 Milano
Scoring by quarter: 22–13, 23–14, 21–25, 18–18
Pts: Güler 14; Rebs: Batista 6 Asts: Tunçeri 6		Pts: Hairston 17; Rebs: Nicholas 8 Asts: Cook 6

Sinan Erdem Dome, Istanbul
Attendance: 6,200
Referees: Ilija Belosevic (SRB), Antonio Conde (ESP), Panagiotis Anastopoulos (GRE)

8 December 2011
20:30

Report

Spirou Charleroi (Belgium)	84–79	(Serbia) Partizan
Scoring by quarter: 13–18, 24–20, 32–23, 15–18
Pts: Mallet 22; Rebs: Green 7 Asts: Welsch 4		Pts: Law 22; Rebs: Mačvan 12; Asts: Kecman 3

Spiroudome, Charleroi
Attendance: 5,000
Referees: Jose Martín (ESP), Jakub Zamojski (POL), Emilio Perez Pizarro (ESP)

8 December 2011
20:45

Report

Real Madrid (Spain)	88–64	(Israel) Maccabi Tel Aviv
Scoring by quarter: 22–15, 26–25, 18–11, 22–13
Pts: Mirotić 26; Rebs: Mirotić 8 Asts: Rodríguez 7		Pts: Langford 18; Rebs: three players 5 Asts: Langford 3

Caja Mágica, Madrid
Attendance: 11,482
Referees: Guerrino Cerebuch (ITA), Robert Lottermoser (GER), Rustu Nuran (TUR)

=== Game 9 ===
14 December 2011
20:45

Report

EA7 Milano (Italy)	88–53	(Belgium) Spirou Charleroi
Scoring by quarter: 23–18, 25–12, 17–16, 23–7
Pts: Radošević 17; Rebs: Bourousis 13; Asts: Giachetti, Cook 7		Pts: Welsch, Riddick 12; Rebs: Hamilton 8 Asts: Hill 3

Mediolanum Forum, Milan
Attendance: 3,000
Referees: Sreten Radovic (CRO), J.C. Garcia Gonzalez (ESP), Olegs Latisevs (LAT)

14 December 2011
20:45

Report

Real Madrid (Spain)	101–83	(Serbia) Partizan
Scoring by quarter: 27–15, 25–22, 24–19, 25–27
Pts: Carroll 22; Rebs: Mirotić 8 Asts: Rodríguez 8		Pts: Mačvan 16; Rebs: Raduljica, Mačvan 4 Asts: four players 3

Caja Mágica, Madrid
Attendance: 6,237
Referees: Recep Ankarali (TUR), Fernando Rocha (POR), Damir Javor (SLO)

15 December 2011
20:45

Report

Maccabi Tel Aviv (Israel)	96–57	(Turkey) Anadolu Efes
Scoring by quarter: 17–20, 19–11, 29–15, 31–11
Pts: Blu 18; Rebs: Eliyahu 9 Asts: Eliyahu 6		Pts: Vujačić 12; Rebs: three players 5 Asts: Tunçeri 7

Yad Eliyahu Arena, Tel Aviv
Attendance: 10,728
Referees: Grzegorz Ziemblicki (POL), Milivoje Jovcic (SRB), Srdan Dozat (CRO)

=== Game 10 ===
22 December 2011
18:15

Report

Anadolu Efes (Turkey)	66–75	(Spain) Real Madrid
Scoring by quarter: 21–15, 22–21, 13–21, 10–18
Pts: Savanović 15; Rebs: Savanović 11; Asts: Tunçeri 5		Pts: Mirotić 16; Rebs: Tomić 6 Asts: Carroll 4

Sinan Erdem Dome, Istanbul
Attendance: 7,200
Referees: Sreten Radovic (CRO), Paolo Taurino (ITA), Milija Vojinovic (SRB)

22 December 2011
20:45

Report

Partizan (Serbia)	66–72	(Italy) EA7 Milano
Scoring by quarter: 18–14, 18–15, 14–22, 16–21
Pts: Milosavljević 14; Rebs: Mačvan 11; Asts: Law 5		Pts: Hairston 18; Rebs: Fotsis 12; Asts: Cook 6

Pionir Hall, Belgrade
Attendance: 7,500
Referees: Juan Carlos Arteaga (ESP), Christos Christodoulou (GRE), Robert Lottermoser (GER)

22 December 2011
20:45

Report

Spirou Charleroi (Belgium)	69–86	(Israel) Maccabi Tel Aviv
Scoring by quarter: 16–22, 18–16, 15–30, 20–18
Pts: Green 16; Rebs: Beghin, Green 5 Asts: Hill 3		Pts: Langford 20; Rebs: three players 5 Asts: Ohayon 5

Spiroudome, Charleroi
Attendance: 5,500
Referees: M. A. Perez Perez (ESP), Tolga Sahin (ITA), Tasos Piloidis (GRE)
