= Ionikos Nikaias B.C. 2008–09 season =

Greek basketball club Ionikos Nikaias

The Ionikos Nikaias B.C. 2008–09 season, was the 2008–09 season of the Greek basketball club Ionikos Nikaias.

== Season results ==
=== League standings ===
Greek C League (Greek 4th Division):

South - Group 2

	Team	Pld	W	L	Points
1.	Panelefsiniakos	26	21	5	47
2.	Ierapetra G.S.	26	20	6	46
3.	Livadeia	26	17	9	43
4.	Nea Kifissia	26	16	10	42
5.	Kronos Agiou Dimitriou G.S.	26	16	10	42
6.	Psychiko	26	16	10	42
7.	Milon	26	13	13	39
8.	Ionikos N.F.	26	13	13	39
9.	Ionikos Nikaias	26	12	13	38
10.	Proodeftiki G.S.	26	12	13	38
11.	PAO Dilinon G.S.	26	9	17	35
12.	Ippokratis Ko G.S.	26	7	19	33
13.	Zografou B.C.	26	6	20	32
14.	Filathlitikos	26	4	22	30

=== Game by game results ===
Date	Match Day	Game	Result
12 October 2008	Match day 1	Ionikos Nikaias 81–74 Zografou B.C.	Win
19 October 2008	Match day 2	Kronos Agiou Dimitriou G.S. 65–59 Ionikos Nikaias	Loss
26 October 2008	Match day 3	Ionikos Nikaias 96–63 Ippokratis	Win
2 November 2008	Match day 4	Proodeftiki G.S. 74–56 Ionikos Nikaias	Loss
9 November 2008	Match day 5	Ionikos Nikaias 77–67 Panelefsiniakos	Win
16 November 2008	Match day 6	Ierapetra G.S. 86–70 Ionikos Nikaias	Loss
23 November 2008	Match day 7	Ionikos Nikaias 66–70 Ionikos NF	Loss
30 November 2008	Match day 8	Filathlitikos 76–81 Ionikos Nikaias	Win
7 December 2008	Match day 9	Ionikos Nikaias 81–82 PAO Dilinon G.S.	Loss
14 December 2008	Match day 10	Ionikos Nikaias 72–91 Nea Kifissia	Loss
21 December 2008	Match day 11	Psychiko 77–65 Ionikos Nikaias	Loss
4 January 2009	Match day 12	Ionikos Nikaias 65–77 Livadeia	Loss
11 January 2009	Match day 13	Milon 96–92 Ionikos Nikaias	Loss
18 January 2009	Match day 14	Zografou B.C. 98–91 Ionikos Nikaias	Loss
25 January 2009	Match day 15	Ionikos Nikaias 83–69 Kronos Agiou Dimitriou G.S.	Win
1 February 2009	Match day 16	Ippokratis G.S. 65–85 Ionikos Nikaias	Win
8 February 2009	Match day 17	Ionikos Nikaias 87–63 Proodeftiki G.S.	Win
15 February 2009	Match day 18	Panelefsiniakos 79–63 Ionikos Nikaias	Lost
22 February 2009	Match day 19	Ionikos Nikaias 66–56 Ierapetra G.S.	Win
8 March 2009	Match day 20	Ionikos NF 68–76 Ionikos Nikaias	Win
15 March 2009	Match day 21	Ionikos Nikaias 75–76 Filathlitikos	Lost
22 March 2009	Match day 22	PAO Dilinon G.S. 84–69 Ionikos Nikaias	Lost
29 March 2009	Match day 23	Nea Kifissia 80–69 Ionikos Nikaias	Lost
5 April 2009	Match day 24	Ionikos Nikaias 92–87 Psychiko	Win
12 April 2009	Match day 25	Livadeia 74–75 Ionikos Nikaias	Win
26 April 2009	Match day 26	Ionikos Nikaias 81–61 Milon	Win
10 May 2009	Play-out	Ionikos Nikaias 88–76 Preveza	Win

=== Greek C LEAGUE CUP results ===
Date	Round	Game
23 September 2008	Round of 16	Proodeftiki G.S. 73–78 Ionikos Nikaias
8 January 2008	Round of 8	Ethnikos Piraeus 72–55 Ionikos Nikaias
