= 1996–97 FIBA Korać Cup =

- League: FIBA Korać Cup
- Sport: Basketball

Finals
- Champions: (Greece) Aris
- Runners-up: (Turkey) Tofaş

FIBA Korać Cup seasons
- ← 1995–96 1997–98 →

The 1996–97 FIBA Korać Cup was the 26th edition of FIBA's Korać Cup basketball competition. The Greek Aris defeated the Turkish Tofaş in the final.

== Team allocation ==
=== Country ranking ===
For the 1996–1997 FIBA Korać Cup, the countries are allocated places according to their place on the FIBA country rankings, which takes into account their performance in European competitions from 1993–94 to 1995–96.

Country ranking for 1996–1997 FIBA Korać Cup

Rank	Country	Points	Teams	Notes
1	Spain	321.667	4	
2	Greece	299.667	4	
3	Italy	216.667	4	
4	France	123.238	4	
5	Turkey	93.333	4	
6	Russia	66	4	
7	Croatia	63	4	
8	Germany	61.389	4	
9	Israel	50.905	4	
10	Slovenia	41.333	4	
11	Belgium	29	4	
12	Yugoslavia	26	4	
13	Portugal	24.5	4	
14	Lithuania	19	4	
15	Ukraine	15.389	4	
16	Poland	12.111	4	
17	Macedonia	11.778	4	
18	Hungary	10.5	4	
19	Slovakia	8.889	4	

Rank	Country	Points	Teams	Notes
20	Czech Republic	8.389	4	
21	Austria	6.556	3	
22	Switzerland	6.056	3	
23	England	5.389	3	
24	Cyprus	5	3	
25	Sweden	4.722	2	
26	Bulgaria	4	2	
27	Latvia	3.667	2	
28	Romania	2.778	2	
29	Bosnia and Herzegovina	2.5	1	
30	Luxembourg	2.167	1	
31	Netherlands	1.944	1	
32	Georgia	1.833	1	
33	Finland	1.667	1	
34	Estonia	1.5	1	
35	Albania	1.444	1	
36	Iceland	0.889	1	
37	Belarus	0.278	1	
38	Denmark	0.167	1	

=== Teams ===
The labels in the parentheses show how each team qualified for the place of its starting round:

- 1st, 2nd, 3rd, etc.: League position after Playoffs
- WC: Wild card

Regular season
(Spain) Unicaja (6th)	(Italy) Cagiva Varese (5th)	(Turkey) Beşiktaş (6th)	(Germany) Tally Oberelchingen (8th)
(Spain) Taugrés (8th)	(Italy) Telemarket Roma (6th)	(Turkey) Meysu (7th)	(Russia) CSK VVS Samara (5th)
(Spain) Turismo Andaluz Granada (WC)	(Italy) Rolly Pistoia (8th)	(Croatia) Zrinjevac (3rd)	(Russia) Spartak Saint Petersburg (7th)
(Spain) Cáceres (10th)	(France) Levallois SCB (6th)	(Croatia) Olimpija Slavoning Osijek (4th)	(Russia) Samara (8th)
(Greece) PAOK (4th)	(France) JDA Dijon (7th)	(Croatia) Benston Zagreb (6th)	(Israel) Bnei Herzliya (4th)
(Greece) Aris (5th)	(France) SLUC Nancy (8th)	(Croatia) Telecomp Vinkovci (7th)	(Israel) Maccabi Rishon LeZion (5th)
(Greece) Sporting Feidas (6th)	(France) Montpellier (9th)	(Germany) Steiner Bayreuth (3rd)	(Israel) Hapoel Holon (6th)
(Greece) Peristeri Radio Korasidi (7th)	(Turkey) Tofaş (4th)	(Germany) UniVersa Bamberg (4th)	
(Italy) Benetton Treviso (4th)	(Turkey) Galatasaray (5th)	(Germany) Gießen 46ers (7th)	
Qualifying round
(Slovenia) Interier Krško (2nd)	(Ukraine) Dendi-Basket (3rd)	(North Macedonia) Nikol-Fert	(Bulgaria) Cherno More
(Slovenia) Idrija (4th)	(Ukraine) BIPA-Moda Odesa (4th)	(North Macedonia) Tikveš	(Bulgaria) Kompakt
(Slovenia) Satex Maribor (5th)	(Ukraine) Lugan (5th)	(North Macedonia) Žito Veles	(Luxembourg) Union Sportive Hiefenech (1st)
(Slovenia) Rogaška Donat MG (6th)	(Ukraine) Ferro-ZNTU (6th)	(Slovakia) Baník Cigel Prievidza (2nd)	(Luxembourg) Contern
(Belgium) Trane Castors Braine (3rd)	(Poland) MKS Polonia Przemyśl (4th)	(Slovakia) Chemosvit (3rd)	(Finland) Namika Lahti (2nd)
(Belgium) Go Pass Verviers-Pepinster (4th)	(Poland) Komfort Stargard Szczeciński (6th)	(Slovakia) Slovakofarma Pezinok (4th)	(Finland) New Wave Basket (10th)
(Belgium) Echo Houthalen	(Poland) Mazowszanka (7th)	(Austria) UKJ Möllersdorf Traiskirchen (2nd)	(Latvia) VEF Metropole Riga (2nd)
(Belgium) Belgacom Aalstar (10th)	(Poland) AZS Elana Torun (8th)	(Austria) Steiermärkische Kapfenberg (3rd)	(Romania) Erbaşu București
(Federal Republic of Yugoslavia) Iva Zorka Pharma Šabac (4th)	(Hungary) Danone Honvéd (2nd)	(Austria) UBC Stahlbau Oberwart (4th)	(Netherlands) Rene Coltof Den Helder (2nd)
(Federal Republic of Yugoslavia) Beobanka (5th)	(Hungary) ZTE (3rd)	(Lithuania) Olimpas (3rd)	(Georgia (country)) Dinamo Tbilisi (1st)
(Federal Republic of Yugoslavia) Crvena Zvezda (6th)	(Hungary) Albacomp Fehérvár (4th)	(Lithuania) Šiauliai (8th)	(Estonia) Kalev Talinn (1st)
(Federal Republic of Yugoslavia) Spartak Subotica (7th)	(Hungary) Tegaz Debreceni Vadkakasok (5th)	(Cyprus) Keravnos (2nd)	(Albania) Partizani Tirana (1st)
(Portugal) Clube Povo de Esgueira	(Czech Republic) USK Erpet Praha (2nd)	(Cyprus) Omonia	
(Portugal) Ovarense	(Czech Republic) Nova Hut Ostrava (3rd)	(Sweden) Astra Södertälje (2nd)	
(Portugal) Estrelas da Avenida (5th)	(Czech Republic) ICEC Nový Jičín (4th)	(Sweden) Plannja (3rd)	
(Portugal) CA Queluz	(Czech Republic) Sparta Praha (5th)	(Switzerland) Versoix Basket	

== Qualifying round ==
Team 1	Agg.	Team 2	1st leg	2nd leg
Steiermärkische Kapfenberg (Austria)	150–159	(Poland) Komfort Stargard Szczecinski	89–85	61–74
Stahlbau Oberwart (Austria)	118–183	(Federal Republic of Yugoslavia) Beobanka	69–94	49–89
Möllersdorf Traiskirchen (Austria)	158–210	(Slovenia) Satex Maribor	76–94	82–116
Albacomp Fehérvár (Hungary)	161–142	(Slovenia) Idrija	89–70	72–72
Nova Hut Ostrava (Czech Republic)	142–168	(Slovenia) Interier Krško	64–81	78–87
Sparta Praha (Czech Republic)	141–134	(Poland) Polonia Przemysl	72–64	68–70
Echo Houthalen (Belgium)	174–162	(Czech Republic) ICEC Nový Jičín	110–85	64–77
Belgacom Aalstar (Belgium)	145–162	(Slovakia) Baník Cigel Prievidza	81–84	64–78
AZS Elana Torun (Poland)	167–178	(Slovakia) Slovakofarma Pezinok	82–81	85–97
Spartak Subotica (Federal Republic of Yugoslavia)	133–122	(Slovakia) Chemosvit	74–65	59–57
Iva Zorka Pharma Šabac (Federal Republic of Yugoslavia)	210–122	(Albania) Partizani Tirana	135–61	75–51
Crvena Zvezda (Federal Republic of Yugoslavia)	180–152	(Bulgaria) Kompakt	93–86	87–66
Cherno More (Bulgaria)	184–143	(Cyprus) Omonia	85–58	99–85
Rogaška Donat MG (Slovenia)	136–128	(Cyprus) Keravnos	72–73	64–55
Dinamo Tbilisi (Georgia (country))	133–159	(Lithuania) Olimpas	73–80	60–79
Šiauliai (Lithuania)	128–136	(Finland) Namika Lahti	70–61	58–75
Trane Castors Braine (Belgium)	201–171	(Finland) New Wave Basket	98–80	103–91
Contern (Luxembourg)	123–210	(Belgium) Go Pass Verviers-Pepinster	63–114	60–96
Union Sportive Hiefenech (Luxembourg)	142–181	(Portugal) Ovarense	78–88	54–93
Versoix Basket (Switzerland)	161–167	(Portugal) Clube Povo de Esgueira	76–90	85–77
Queluz (Portugal)	149–146	(Netherlands) Rene Coltof Den Helder	78–73	71–73
Plannja (Sweden)	177–105	(Portugal) Estrelas da Avenida	89–44	88–61
Ferro ZNTU (Ukraine)	158–173	(Sweden) Astra Södertälje	71–72	87–101
Lugan (Ukraine)	160–202	(Estonia) Kalev Talinn	86–86	74–116
Erbaşu București (Romania)	139–168	(Ukraine) BIPA-Moda Odesa	58–80	81–88
VEF Metropole Riga (Latvia)	157–167	(Ukraine) Dendi	82–75	75–92
Tikveš (North Macedonia)	151–171	(Czech Republic) USK Erpet Praha	78–77	73–104
Nikol-Fert (North Macedonia)	130–113	(Hungary) Debreceni Vadkakasok	74–43	56–70
ZTE (Hungary)	169–144	(North Macedonia) Žito	98–75	71–69
Mazowszanka (Poland)	183–175	(Hungary) Danone Honvéd	88–74	95–101

== Regular season ==
Key to colors
Top two places in each group advance to round of 32

=== Group A ===
	Team	Pld	W	L	PF	PA	PD	Pts
1.	(Greece) Aris	6	6	0	467	416	+51	12
2.	(Slovenia) Satex Maribor	6	2	4	470	484	−14	8
3.	(Czech Republic) USK Erpet Praha	6	2	4	478	493	−15	8
4.	(Croatia) Olimpija Slavoning	6	2	4	468	490	−22	8

=== Group B ===
	Team	Pld	W	L	PF	PA	PD	Pts
1.	(Spain) Unicaja	6	5	1	501	408	+93	11
2.	(Turkey) Beşiktaş	6	3	3	427	442	−15	9
3.	(Israel) Hapoel Holon	6	2	4	489	491	−2	8
4.	(Portugal) Queluz	6	2	4	429	505	−76	8

=== Group C ===
	Team	Pld	W	L	PF	PA	PD	Pts
1.	(Federal Republic of Yugoslavia) Beobanka	6	6	0	489	382	+107	12
2.	(Russia) Samara	6	2	4	463	508	−45	8
3.	(France) Montpellier	6	2	4	448	482	−34	8
4.	(Slovakia) Slovakofarma Pezinok	6	2	4	447	475	−28	8

=== Group D ===
	Team	Pld	W	L	PF	PA	PD	Pts
1.	(Italy) Rolly Pistoia	6	4	2	462	442	+20	10
2.	(Belgium) Trane Castors Braine	6	3	3	494	489	+5	9
3.	(Ukraine) Dendi-Basket	6	3	3	469	501	−32	9
4.	(Germany) UniVersa Bamberg	6	2	4	434	427	+7	8

=== Group E ===
	Team	Pld	W	L	PF	PA	PD	Pts
1.	(Spain) Taugrés	6	6	0	557	413	+144	12
2.	(Croatia) Telecomp Vinkovci	6	2	4	438	478	−40	8
3.	(Belgium) Go Pass Verviers-Pepinster	6	2	4	441	480	−39	8
4.	(North Macedonia) Nikol-Fert	6	2	4	431	496	−65	8

=== Group F ===
	Team	Pld	W	L	PF	PA	PD	Pts
1.	(Turkey) Meysu	6	5	1	427	418	+9	11
2.	(France) SLUC Nancy	6	3	3	471	436	+35	9
3.	(Slovenia) Interier Krško	6	2	4	417	435	−18	8
4.	(Ukraine) Bipa-Moda Odesa	6	2	4	443	469	−26	8

=== Group G ===
	Team	Pld	W	L	PF	PA	PD	Pts
1.	(Greece) Peristeri Radio Korasidi	6	6	0	533	388	+145	12
2.	(Federal Republic of Yugoslavia) Iva Zorka Pharma Šabac	6	3	3	499	492	+7	9
3.	(Germany) MTV Gießen 46ers	6	3	3	441	446	−5	9
4.	(Finland) Namika Lahti	6	0	6	393	540	−147	6

=== Group H ===
	Team	Pld	W	L	PF	PA	PD	Pts
1.	(Poland) Mazowszanka	6	4	2	533	528	+5	10
2.	(Italy) Cagiva Varese	6	3	3	505	489	+16	9
3.	(Israel) Bnei Herzliya	6	3	3	496	500	−4	9
4.	(Bulgaria) Cherno More	6	2	4	516	533	−17	8

=== Group I ===
	Team	Pld	W	L	PF	PA	PD	Pts
1.	(Italy) Telemarket Roma	6	5	1	476	426	+50	11
2.	(Turkey) Tofaş	6	4	2	510	414	+96	10
3.	(Federal Republic of Yugoslavia) Spartak Subotica	6	3	3	466	504	−38	9
4.	(Hungary) ZTE	6	0	6	399	507	−108	6

=== Group J ===
	Team	Pld	W	L	PF	PA	PD	Pts
1.	(Estonia) Kalev	6	5	1	529	498	+31	11
2.	(Spain) Turismo Andaluz Granada	6	4	2	507	487	+20	10
3.	(Germany) Steiner Bayreuth	6	3	3	482	472	+10	9
4.	(Hungary) Albacomp Fehérvár	6	0	6	447	508	−61	6

=== Group K ===
	Team	Pld	W	L	PF	PA	PD	Pts
1.	(Greece) Sporting Feidas	6	6	0	495	394	+101	11
2.	(Russia) CSK VVS	6	3	3	503	512	−9	9
3.	(Sweden) Plannja Basket	6	2	4	449	485	−36	8
4.	(Slovakia) Banik Cigel Prievidza	6	1	5	462	518	−56	7

=== Group L ===
	Team	Pld	W	L	PF	PA	PD	Pts
1.	(Croatia) Benston Zagreb	6	6	0	468	383	+85	12
2.	(Israel) Maccabi Rishon LeZion	6	4	2	501	461	+40	10
3.	(France) Levallois SCB	6	2	4	449	449	0	8
4.	(Czech Republic) Sparta Praha	6	0	6	357	482	−125	6

=== Group M ===
	Team	Pld	W	L	PF	PA	PD	Pts
1.	(Greece) PAOK	6	6	0	587	424	+163	12
2.	(Portugal) Ovarense	6	3	3	489	489	0	9
3.	(Turkey) Galatasaray	6	3	3	422	486	−64	9
4.	(Sweden) Astra Södertälje	6	0	6	451	550	−99	6

=== Group N ===
	Team	Pld	W	L	PF	PA	PD	Pts
1.	(Spain) Cáceres	6	6	0	554	471	+83	12
2.	(Federal Republic of Yugoslavia) Crvena Zvezda	6	4	2	520	468	+52	10
3.	(Poland) Komfort Stargard Szczecinski	6	1	5	447	511	−64	7
4.	(Russia) Spartak Saint Petersburg	6	1	5	482	553	−79	7

=== Group O ===
	Team	Pld	W	L	PF	PA	PD	Pts
1.	(Italy) Benetton Treviso	6	5	1	624	495	+129	11
2.	(Croatia) Zrinjevac	6	5	1	553	491	+62	11
3.	(Lithuania) Olimpas	6	2	4	496	538	−42	8
4.	(Slovenia) Rogaška Donat MG	6	0	6	464	613	−149	6

=== Group P ===
	Team	Pld	W	L	PF	PA	PD	Pts
1.	(Germany) Tally Oberelchingen	6	5	1	520	458	+62	11
2.	(France) JDA Dijon	6	4	2	475	439	+36	10
3.	(Belgium) Echo Houthalen	6	2	4	510	535	−25	8
4.	(Portugal) Clube Povo de Esgueira	6	1	5	457	530	−73	7

== Round of 32 ==
Team 1	Agg.	Team 2	1st leg	2nd leg
Satex Maribor (Slovenia)	125–149	(Spain) Unicaja	65–90	60–59
Beşiktaş (Turkey)	128–142	(Greece) Aris	64–65	64–77
Samara (Russia)	124–179	(Italy) Rolly Pistoia	48–74	76–105
Trane Castors Braine (Belgium)	138–167	(Federal Republic of Yugoslavia) Beobanka	77–69	61–98
Telecomp Vinkovci (Croatia)	133–134	(Turkey) Meysu	70–72	63–62
SLUC Nancy (France)	164–180	(Spain) Taugrés	84–78	80–102
Iva Zorka Pharma Šabac (Federal Republic of Yugoslavia)	165–176	(Poland) Mazowzanka	81–77	84–99
Cagiva Varese (Italy)	159–164	(Greece) Peristeri Radio Korasidi	78–72	81–92
Tofaş (Turkey)	131–126	(Estonia) Kalev	69–63	62–63
Turismo Andaluz Granada (Spain)	153–164	(Italy) Telemarket Roma	88–70	65–94
CSK VVS (Russia)	145–179	(Croatia) Benston Zagreb	74–86	71–93
Maccabi Rishon LeZion (Israel)	138–140	(Greece) Sporting Feidas	62–61	76–79
Ovarense (Portugal)	160–175	(Spain) Cáceres	79–73	81–102
Crvena zvezda (Federal Republic of Yugoslavia)	186–202	(Greece) PAOK	99–102	87–100
Zrinjevac (Croatia)	180–167	(Germany) Tally Oberelchingen	100–89	80–78
JDA Dijon (France)	149–176	(Italy) Benetton Treviso	62–87	87–89

== Round of 16 ==
Team 1	Agg.	Team 2	1st leg	2nd leg
Unicaja (Spain)	141–117	(Italy) Rolly Pistoia	63–61	78–56
Aris (Greece)	141–138	(Federal Republic of Yugoslavia) Beobanka	80–68	61–70
Meysu (Turkey)	141–177	(Poland) Mazowzanka	72–80	69–97
Taugrés (Spain)	134–136	(Greece) Peristeri Radio Korasidi	83–70	51–66
Tofaş (Turkey)	115–113	(Croatia) Benston Zagreb	64–57	51–56
Telemarket Roma (Italy)	154–147	(Greece) Sporting Feidas	78–66	76–81
Cáceres (Spain)	169–152	(Croatia) Zrinjevac	81–74	88–78
PAOK (Greece)	145–162	(Italy) Benetton Treviso	85–78	60–84

== Quarterfinals ==
Team 1	Agg.	Team 2	1st leg	2nd leg
Unicaja (Spain)	131–144	(Poland) Mazowzanka	74–60	57–84
Aris (Greece)	139–136	(Greece) Peristeri Radio Korasidi	75–65	64–71
Tofaş (Turkey)	145–134	(Spain) Cáceres	64–59	81–75
Telemarket Roma (Italy)	135–154	(Italy) Benetton Treviso	73–63	62–91

== Semifinals ==
Team 1	Agg.	Team 2	1st leg	2nd leg
Mazowzanka (Poland)	150–167	(Turkey) Tofaş	74–77	76–90
Aris (Greece)	163–160	(Italy) Benetton Treviso	77–73	86–87(OT)

== Finals ==
Team 1	Agg.	Team 2	1st leg	2nd leg
Aris (Greece)	154–147	(Turkey) Tofaş	66–77	88–70

== Rosters ==
(Greece) Aris: Ioannis Sioutis, Panagiotis Liadelis, Mario Boni, Charles Shackleford, Piculin Ortiz; Dinos Angelidis (C), Tzanis Stavrakopoulos, Aris Cholopoulos, Georgios Floros, Mike Nahar. Coach: Slobodan Subotic
(Turkey) Tofaş Bursa: Vladan Alanovic, Steven Rogers, Murat Konuk (C), Samir Avdic, Rashard Griffith; Semsettin Bas, Levent Topsakal, Cuneyt Erden. Coach: Attila Cakmak

1996–97 FIBA Korać Cup Champions

Aris
1st title

== See also ==
- 1996–97 FIBA EuroLeague
- 1996–97 FIBA EuroCup
