= Aris Tatarounis =

Aris Tatarounis Άρης Ταταρούνης
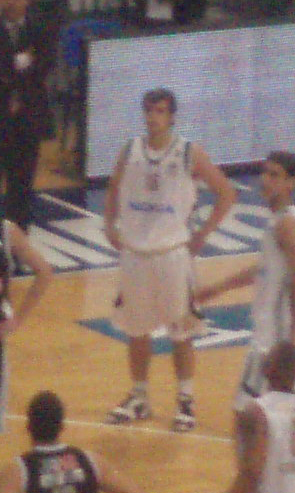
- Tatarounis in the background.

Personal information
- Born: May 4, 1989 (age 37) Marousi, Attica
- Listed height: 6 ft 3.75 in (1.92 m)
- Listed weight: 200 lb (91 kg)

Career information
- Playing career: 2007–2016
- Position: Point guard / shooting guard

Career history
- 2007–2008: Panathinaikos
- 2008–2009: Panelefsiniakos
- 2009–2011: Ionikos NF
- 2011–2012: KAP Agia Paraskevi
- 2012–2013: Near East
- 2013–2014: Sporting
- 2014–2016: Near East

Aris Tatarounis (Greek: Άρης Ταταρούνης; born May 4, 1989) is a Greek former professional basketball player. At a height of 1.92 m (6 ft 3 1/2 in) tall, he played at the point guard and shooting guard positions.

== Professional career ==
Tatarounis began playing club basketball with the junior youth teams of Panathinaikos. In the 2005–06 season, he trained some with the senior men's team of Panathinaikos, but he did not play in any games with them. In the 2006–07 season, he played in Greece's semi-pro competition, the 3rd-tier level Greek B League, with Pagrati. He made his professional debut during the 2007–08 season with Panathinaikos.

In his club career, Tatarounis played with the following clubs: Pagrati, Panathinaikos, Panelefsiniakos, Ionikos NF, KAP Agia Paraskevi, Near East, and Sporting.

== National team career ==
Tatarounis was a member of the Greek junior national under-16 and Greek junior national under-18 teams, and with the Greek junior national teams, he played at the 2005 FIBA Europe Under-16 Championship and the 2006 Balkans Under-18 Championship.
