= Basketball Elchingen 1999 =

German basketball club

Scanplus Baskets
- Leagues: ProB
- History: SV Oberelchingen –1999; Basketball Elchingen 1999; 1999–present
- Arena: Bruhlhalle Elchingen
- Capacity: 1,400
- Location: Elchingen, Germany
- Team manager: Dario Jerkic
- Championships: 1 ProB
- Website: www.scanplusbaskets.de
Home	Away

Basketball Elchingen 1999, for sponsorship reasons Scanplus Baskets Elchingen, is a German professional basketball club, based in Elchingen. The club currently plays in the ProB, the German third tier division. Until 1999, the team was known as SV Oberelchingen.

In 2018, Elchingen was crowned the ProB champions after defeating Rostock Seawolves in the finals of the playoffs. However, the team resigned its position to promote to the second-tier ProA.

== Honours ==
- ProB
  - Champions (1): 2017–18

== European record ==
Season	Competition	Round	Club	Home	Away
1997–97	FIBA Korać Cup	R2	(France) JDA Dijon	69–75	80–85
1997–97	FIBA Korać Cup	R2	(Portugal) Aveiro Esgueira	83–55	84–99
1997–97	FIBA Korać Cup	R2	(Belgium) Echo Houthalen	93–83	81–91
1997–97	FIBA Korać Cup	R3	(Croatia) Zrinjevac	100–89	78–80
1997–98	FIBA Korać Cup	R2	(Italy) Comerson Siena	65–67	89–81
1997–98	FIBA Korać Cup	R2	(Portugal) Aveiro Esgueira	75–87	83–87
1997–98	FIBA Korać Cup	R2	(Spain) Léon Caja España	65–67	89–81
