= Lawrence Funderburke =

American basketball player (born 1970)

Personal information
- Born: December 15, 1970 (age 55) Columbus, Ohio, U.S.
- Listed height: 6 ft 9 in (2.06 m)
- Listed weight: 230 lb (104 kg)

Career information
- High school: Wehrle (Columbus, Ohio)
- College: Indiana (1989–1990); Ohio State (1991–1994)
- NBA draft: 1994: 2nd round, 51st overall pick
- Drafted by: Sacramento Kings
- Playing career: 1994–2005
- Position: Power forward
- Number: 51

Career history
- 1994–1995: Ampelokipi
- 1995: Hapoel Eilat
- 1995–1996: P.A.O.K.
- 1996–1997: Pau-Orthez
- 1997–2004: Sacramento Kings
- 2005: Chicago Bulls

Career highlights
- Greek League All-Star (1996 I); Greek All-Star Game Slam Dunk champion (1996 I)

Career NBA statistics
- Points: 2,031 (6.4 ppg)
- Rebounds: 1,142 (3.6 rpg)
- Stats at NBA.com
- Stats at Basketball Reference

Lawrence Damon Funderburke (born December 15, 1970) is an American former professional basketball player.

== Basketball career ==
Funderburke was born and raised in Columbus, Ohio, where he played high school basketball at Wehrle High School, leading them to a state championship in his junior season (1988).

=== Collegiate career ===
Funderburke played his freshman year of college basketball at Indiana University, where he is known for tangling with Bobby Knight. He transferred after that season to Ohio State University, where he played his three remaining years of eligibility. There, he teamed with fellow future NBA player Jimmy Jackson to lead Ohio State to the Big Ten Championship in 1992.

=== NBA career ===
Funderburke was drafted by the Sacramento Kings in the 2nd round (51st overall) of the 1994 NBA draft, honing his game in Europe (with Greece's Ampelokipi and PAOK and French outfit Pau-Orthez) for three years before joining the Kings in 1997.

Funderburke averaged 9.5 points and 4.5 rebounds as a rookie and played a role for the Kings during their successful seasons spanning from 1999 to 2003 as a backup to Chris Webber. After serving mainly as a reliable backup for Webber for six seasons, Funderburke missed the entire 2003–04 season, ultimately being waived in March 2004.

After appearing in two games for the Chicago Bulls, Funderburke retired in June 2005, holding NBA career averages of 6.4 points, 3.6 rebounds and 0.6 assists per game.

== Other activities ==
Funderburke graduated with a degree in business finance from Ohio State. While an active player in 2000, Funderburke and his wife founded the Lawrence Funderburke Youth Organization, a non-profit organization dedicated to help at-risk children through a variety of services. Hook Me Up, Playa! is a book by Funderburke that warns both professional and aspiring athletes of the dark side of the limelight through interviews with close friends who are (or were) professional athletes.

== Personal life ==
Funderburke's daughter, Nyah, is currently a student-athlete competing for the Ohio State swim team. She qualified for the 2022 NCAA Division I Swimming Championships and was named a CSCAA first-team All-American for her contributions on Ohio State's 400-yard medley relay that finished eighth overall.
