= Vangelis Margaritis =

Greek basketball coach, executive and former player

PAOK
- Title: Player development coach
- League: Greek Basketball League; EuroCup

Personal information
- Born: December 5, 1982 (age 43) Katerini, Greece
- Listed height: 6 ft 8 in (2.03 m)
- Listed weight: 250 lb (113 kg)

Career information
- Playing career: 2001–2024
- Position: Power forward / center
- Coaching career: 2026–present

Career history

Playing
- 2001–2002: Iraklis
- 2002–2003: Ionikos Nikaias
- 2003–2005: EAP
- 2005–2007: Keravnos Aigio
- 2007–2010: Peristeri
- 2010–2011: KAOD
- 2011–2012: Ikaroi Serron
- 2012–2021: PAOK
- 2021–2022: Kolossos Rodou
- 2022–2024: PAOK

Coaching
- 2026–present: PAOK (player development)

Career highlights
- Greek League All-Star (2008); 2× Greek Second Division champion (2009, 2011)

Evangelos "Vangelis" Margaritis (alternate spellings: Evaggelos, Vaggelis; Greek: Ευάγγελος «Βαγγέλης» Μαργαρίτης; born December 5, 1982) is a Greek basketball coach and executive and former professional basketball player. He is currently the player development coach of PAOK Thessaloniki, where he spent most of his playing career and served as team captain.

During his playing career, Margaritis primarily played at the power forward position, while also being used as a center. He is 2.03 m (6 ft 8 in) tall. He made 423 official appearances for PAOK, the most by any player in the history of the club's basketball team.

== Professional career ==
Margaritis made his top-level professional debut with Iraklis during the 2001–02 season. He subsequently played for Ionikos Nikaias, EAP, Keravnos Aigio, Peristeri, KAOD and Ikaroi Serron before joining PAOK in 2012.

Margaritis signed his first contract with PAOK Thessaloniki in 2012. On July 4, 2013, after his first season with the club, he agreed to a two-year contract extension. He renewed again in June 2015, this time through the 2017–18 season, and signed another two-year extension in June 2018.

In 2016, Margaritis became PAOK's team captain, a role he retained for most of the remainder of his playing career with the club.

After nine consecutive seasons with PAOK, Margaritis left the club in the summer of 2021 and joined Kolossos Rodou. He spent the 2021–22 season in Rhodes, appearing in 26 Greek League games and averaging 6.8 points, 4.0 rebounds and 1.2 assists per game.

On June 16, 2022, Margaritis returned to PAOK following his one-season away from the club. On June 23, 2023, he renewed his contract for another season, which became his 11th season overall with PAOK.

During the 2023–24 season, Margaritis established new club records for longevity. On April 21, 2024, he made his 293rd Greek League appearance for PAOK, surpassing Giannis Politis as the club's all-time leader in league appearances. Shortly afterwards, he also surpassed Nikos Boudouris' previous record of 421 appearances across all competitions.

The 2023–24 season proved to be the final season of Margaritis' professional playing career. He retired after a 24-year playing career and immediately moved into PAOK's basketball operations. He finished his PAOK playing career with 423 official appearances, an all-time club record.

== National team career ==
Margaritis made his debut with the senior Greece men's national basketball team in November 2017, shortly before his 35th birthday. He competed for Greece during the European qualification campaign for the 2019 FIBA Basketball World Cup and later in the EuroBasket 2022 qualifiers.

In his senior national team debut against the Great Britain, he scored five points. Margaritis made 17 appearances in total for the senior Greek national team.

== Post-playing career ==
=== Technical director (2024–2025) ===
On September 4, 2024, shortly after the end of his playing career, Margaritis was appointed Technical Director of PAOK. The appointment allowed him to remain with the club immediately after his retirement, moving from the playing roster into its sporting structure.

He served as Technical Director throughout the 2024–25 season. During that campaign, PAOK reached the 2024–25 FIBA Europe Cup Final, its first European final since 1996.

Margaritis remained Technical Director at the beginning of the 2025–26 season. In September 2025, when PAOK B.C. assumed the full organisation and supervision of the club's basketball academy, Margaritis was given responsibility for overseeing the academy as part of his duties.

=== Assistant general manager (2025–2026) ===
Following the change in PAOK's ownership in late 2025, the club reorganised its sporting department. On December 5, 2025, former PAOK player Nikos Boudouris was appointed General Manager, with Margaritis becoming Assistant General Manager. Michalis Giannakidis continued as Team Manager.

During the second half of the 2025–26 season, however, Margaritis' responsibilities gradually shifted away from a purely front-office role and towards player development and the coaching staff.

=== Player development coach (2026–present) ===
By March 2026, Margaritis was already working directly with PAOK players on their individual development. His work was particularly associated with Nigerian center Clifford Omoruyi, who had joined PAOK midway through his first professional season.

After Omoruyi scored a then season-high 17 points against Mykonos on March 25, 2026, head coach Pantelis Boutskos revealed that PAOK had established a programme of individual training sessions with Margaritis aimed at gradually developing Omoruyi's game.

Margaritis' increased involvement with the coaching staff formed part of the wider restructuring of PAOK's sporting department following the March 2026 agreement with Andrea Trinchieri. In April, reports stated that Trinchieri had identified Margaritis' ability to work on the individual development of players and that his role had consequently moved closer to the team and coaching staff. The improvement shown by Omoruyi during this period was specifically linked to the individual work he had been carrying out with Margaritis.

The transition occurred while Margaritis was formally serving as Assistant General Manager, and PAOK did not announce a specific date on which the title was changed. By the latter part of the 2025–26 season, however, his primary duties were focused on individual player development as a member of the team's coaching staff.

Margaritis remained with PAOK following the May 2026 changes to the club's sporting and administrative structure and continued in the player-development role ahead of the 2026–27 season. PAOK currently lists him as its Players Development Coach, responsible for the individual development and improvement of the team's players.

== Awards and accomplishments ==
=== Professional career ===
- Greek League All-Star: 2008
- 2× Greek Second Division champion: 2009, 2011
