= Sanjin Kalaica =

Croatian basketball player

retired player
- Position: Point guard

Personal information
- Born: July 22, 1969 (age 57) SR Croatia, SFR Yugoslavia
- Listed height: 1.93 m (6 ft 4 in)

Career information
- Playing career: 2000–present

Career history
- 1995–1998: Telecomp Vinkovci
- 1998–1999: HKK Brotnjo Čitluk
- 1999–2000: Rabotnički
- 2000–2002: Slavonski Brod

Sanjin Kalaica (born July 22, 1969) is a former Croatian professional basketball player.
