= Pantelis Boutskos =

Greek basketball coach (born 1973)

Personal information
- Born: 5 November 1973 (age 53) Thessaloniki, Greece
- Coaching career: 1994–present

Career history

Coaching
- 2005–2009: Aris (assistant)
- 2009–2017: PAOK Thessaloniki (assistant)
- 2019–2020: Aris (assistant)
- 2020–2021: Iraklis (assistant)
- 2021: Iraklis (interim)
- 2023: Iraklis
- 2023–2024: Aias Evosmou
- 2024–2026: PAOK Thessaloniki (assistant)
- 2026: PAOK Thessaloniki

Career highlights
- FIBA Europe Cup runner-up (2026)

Pantelis Boutskos (Greek: Παντελής Μπούτσκος; born 5 November 1973) is a Greek professional basketball coach. He most recently served as head coach of PAOK Thessaloniki during the second half of the 2025–26 season, leading the club to the 2025–26 FIBA Europe Cup Final and the semifinals of the Greek Basketball League.

Boutskos has spent much of his coaching career in Thessaloniki, serving on the coaching staffs of PAOK, Aris and Iraklis.

== Coaching career ==
=== Early career ===
Boutskos was born in Thessaloniki on 5 November 1973. He became involved in coaching at a young age and began his coaching career at 21 with Aeschylus before later working with the basketball program of Mandoulides Schools.

=== Aris (2005–2009) ===
In 2005, Boutskos joined the technical staff of Aris, where he spent four seasons as an assistant coach.

During his first spell with Aris, he worked alongside head coaches including Ilias Zouros, Andrea Mazzon and Gordon Herbert. He was part of the coaching staff when Aris reached the 2005–06 ULEB Cup Final and subsequently competed in the EuroLeague, reaching the Top 16 in both the 2006–07 and 2007–08 seasons.

=== PAOK assistant coach (2009–2017) ===
In 2009, Boutskos moved to PAOK Thessaloniki, beginning an eight-year spell as an assistant to head coach Soulis Markopoulos.

During this period, PAOK finished third in the Greek League on three occasions, in 2010–11, 2013–14 and 2014–15. He also gained experience in European competition with the club, including the EuroCup and Basketball Champions League.

=== Return to Aris and Iraklis ===
Boutskos returned to Aris for the 2019–20 season as an assistant coach.

In 2020, he joined Iraklis, initially serving as an assistant coach. He later took over the team on an interim basis before leaving the club in October 2021.

In August 2022, Iraklis announced Boutskos as its head coach ahead of the new season. However, the two sides ended their cooperation before the beginning of the campaign.

Boutskos returned to Iraklis in February 2023 following the resignation of Kostas Mexas, taking over the team during its campaign in the Greek second division.

=== Aias Evosmou (2023–2024) ===
In December 2023, Boutskos was appointed head coach of Aias Evosmou for the remainder of the 2023–24 Elite League season.

He took over the club after it had recorded three victories in its first 12 games. Aias eventually entered the relegation play-outs, where it was eliminated by Panerythraikos and relegated from the division.

=== Return to PAOK (2024–2026) ===
On 12 June 2024, Boutskos returned to PAOK after seven years away from the club, joining the staff of newly appointed head coach Massimo Cancellieri as his lead assistant.

He remained with PAOK for the 2025–26 season following the appointment of Jure Zdovc as head coach.

On 2 March 2026, following Zdovc's departure, PAOK promoted Boutskos to head coach for the remainder of the season. The appointment came one day before the club announced that Andrea Trinchieri would become its head coach from the beginning of the 2026–27 season.

=== PAOK head coach (2026) ===
Boutskos took charge of PAOK at a crucial stage of the 2025–26 campaign and guided the team through the knockout stages of the 2025–26 FIBA Europe Cup.

PAOK eliminated Peristeri in the quarter-finals before facing UCAM Murcia in the semifinals. After winning the first leg in Thessaloniki, PAOK advanced to the Final despite losing the return game in Spain, winning the series 164–162 on aggregate.

In the Greek League, PAOK finished the regular season in third place under Boutskos.

In the FIBA Europe Cup Final, PAOK defeated Bilbao Basket 79–73 in the first leg in Thessaloniki. Bilbao won the second game 89–74 and claimed the title 162–153 on aggregate, leaving PAOK as runners-up for the second consecutive season.

PAOK subsequently eliminated Peristeri in the Greek League playoffs to advance to the semifinals. The club's season ended on 30 May 2026 following its semifinal series against Panathinaikos.

== Education ==
Boutskos holds a degree in Economics from the Aristotle University of Thessaloniki. He has also studied Industrial and Organizational Psychology and Personal Selling at the University of Rotterdam.

Through scholarship programs, he attended coaching programs with the Memphis Grizzlies during Hubie Brown's tenure as head coach, as well as NCAA programs with the Memphis Tigers under John Calipari and the Kentucky Wildcats under Tubby Smith.
