= Michalis Perrakis =

Greek basketball player

Michalis Perrakis Μιχάλης Περράκης
Free agent
- Position: Center / power forward

Personal information
- Born: March 15, 1984 (age 42) Athens, Greece
- Listed height: 6 ft 9.5 in (2.07 m)
- Listed weight: 208 lb (94 kg)

Career information
- NBA draft: 2004: undrafted
- Playing career: 2002–present

Career history
- 2002–2004: AEK Athens
- 2002–2003: →Ionikos N.F.
- 2004–2006: Olympia Patras
- 2006–2008: Sporting
- 2008–2009: Apollon Kalamarias
- 2009–2020: Lavrio

Career highlights
- Greek 2nd Division champion (2006)

Michalis Perrakis (Greek: Μιχάλης Περράκης; born on March 15, 1984, in Athens, Greece) is a Greek professional basketball player who last played for Lavrio of the Greek Basket League. He is a 6-foot-9-inch (2.06 m) tall center, who can also play as a power forward.

== Professional career ==
Perrakis played amateur basket for Lavrio before starting his pro career in 2002 with AEK Athens. The same year, he was loaned to the Greek League club Ionikos N.F.

In 2004, he signed with Olympia Patras. In 2006, he moved to Sporting.

In 2009, Perrakis returned to Lavrio after 6 years. He became the captain of the club, after the long-time captain Sakis Giannakopoulos retired in 2018.
