= Kostas Mexas =

Greek basketball coach

ZTE KK
- Position: Head coach
- League: Nemzeti Bajnokság I/A

Personal information
- Born: October 25, 1976 (age 50) Corfu, Greece
- Coaching career: 1997–present

Career history

Coaching
- 1997–2003: Chortiatis
- 2003–2004: Ampelokipoi (assistant)
- 2004–2005: Megas Alexandros Thessaloniki (women)
- 2005–2006: Kastoria (women)
- 2006–2008: M.E.N.T.
- 2010: Iraklis Thessaloniki
- 2011–2014: K.A.O.D. (assistant)
- 2014–2015: K.A.O.D.
- 2015–2017: Apollon Patra
- 2017–2018: Trikala
- 2018–2019: Iraklis Thessaloniki
- 2020: P.A.O.K.
- 2021–2022: Iraklis Thessaloniki
- 2022–2023: Ionikos Nikaia
- 2023: Iraklis
- 2023: Panathinaikos (assistant)
- 2023–2025: Lavrio
- 2025–present: ZTE KK

Kostas Mexas (Greek: Κώστας Μέξας; born October 25, 1976) is a Greek professional basketball coach for ZTE KK of the Nemzeti Bajnokság I/A.

== Coaching career ==
After coaching Choriatis from 1997 to 2003, Mexas started working as an assistant coach with the Greek Basket League club Ampelokipoi in 2003. He became the head coach of two women teams from 2004 until 2006. He became the head coach of the Greek club MENT in 2006.

On 2014, after working for 4 years as an assistant at KAOD, he became the head coach of the club, replacing Nenad Marković. The following two years, he coached Apollon Patras, before being sacked from the team on January 7, 2017. On June 21, 2017, Mexas as appointed as the head coach at Aries Trikala of the Greek Basket League.

On July 28, 2023, Mexas was appointed as the head coach of Lavrio. On June 10, 2024, he renewed his contract with the club.
