= Justin Hamilton (basketball, born 1980) =

American basketball player (born 1980)

Personal information
- Born: December 19, 1980 (age 45) Sarasota, Florida, U.S.
- Listed height: 6 ft 4 in (1.93 m)
- Listed weight: 215 lb (98 kg)

Career information
- High school: Booker (Sarasota, Florida)
- College: Florida (1999–2003)
- NBA draft: 2003: undrafted
- Playing career: 2003–2016
- Position: Point guard / shooting guard

Career history
- 2003–2004: Ionikos
- 2004: Roanoke Dazzle
- 2004–2005: Iraklis
- 2005: Real Madrid
- 2005–2006: Montepaschi Siena
- 2006–2007: Asseco Prokom Gdynia
- 2007: Pamesa Valencia
- 2007–2016: Spirou Charleroi
- Stats at Basketball Reference

Justin Charles Hamilton (born December 19, 1980) is an American-Belgian former professional basketball player, who played at shooting guard-point guard. Hamilton played college basketball for the University of Florida, and then played professionally for several European teams.

== High school ==
A four-year starter at Booker High School in Sarasota, Florida, Hamilton was the state of Florida's class 4A player of the year as a senior in 1999.

== College ==
Hamilton accepted an athletic scholarship to attend the University of Florida, where he played for the Florida Gators men's basketball team under coach Billy Donovan from 1999 to 2003. He played a combo guard role for the Gators, and helped lead the team to four consecutive NCAA Tournament appearances. The Gators reached the finals of the 2000 NCAA Men's Division I Basketball Tournament, before losing to Michigan State 76–89.

== Professional career ==
Went undrafted in the 2003 NBA draft. Signed with the Detroit Pistons as a free agent. He was waived before the start of the season. Hamilton has been with Spirou Charleroi of the Basketball League Belgium since 2007 where he helped lead the team to 5 Finals with 4 consecutive wins.

== Belgian Nationality ==
Hamilton received his Belgian Citizenship in June 2013.

== Championships ==
- Spanish ACB (1): 2005
- Belgian BLB (4): 2008, 2009, 2010, 2011
