= 1979–80 FIBA Korać Cup =

- League: FIBA Korać Cup
- Sport: Basketball

Final
- Champions: (Italy) Arrigoni Rieti
- Runners-up: (Socialist Federal Republic of Yugoslavia) Cibona

FIBA Korać Cup seasons
- ← 1978–79 1980–81 →

The 1979–80 FIBA Korać Cup was the ninth edition of FIBA's Korać Cup basketball competition. The Italian Arrigoni Rieti defeated the Yugoslav Cibona in the final on March 26, 1980 in Liège, Belgium. Arrigoni Rieti's victory ended four years of consecutive wins by Yugoslav teams.

== First round ==
Team 1	Agg.	Team 2	1st leg	2nd leg
Miñón Valladolid (Spain)	203–149	(Portugal) Sangalhos	110–71	93–78
Sporting (Greece)	137–142	(West Germany) Bayreuth	66–59	71–83
Verviers-Pepinster (Belgium)	119–140	(Italy) Antonini Siena	63–78	56–62
Ionikos Nikaias (Greece)	196–199	(Switzerland) Nyon	113–104	83–95
Hapoel Haifa (Israel)	161–163	(Italy) Jollycolombani Forlì	95–84	66–79
Maximarkt Wels (Austria)	160–167	(Hungary) Vasas	77–75	83–92
FC Mulhouse (France)	172–176	(England) Team Fiat Stars	96–97	76–79
Karşıyaka (Turkey)	131–151	(Belgium) CEP Fleurus	58–69	73–82
Soleuvre (Luxembourg)	158–220	(West Germany) Wolfenbüttel	88–96	70–124

== Second round ==
Team 1	Agg.	Team 2	1st leg	2nd leg
Dalkeith Saints (Scotland)	167–233	(Spain) Miñón Valladolid	86–115	81–118
Bayreuth (West Germany)	140–187	(Italy) Antonini Siena	64–103	76–84
Nyon (Switzerland)	198–218	(France) ASPO Tours	102–111	96–107
Cotonificio (Spain)	218–156	(England) Sunderland Sunblest	120–81	98–75
Hapoel Tel Aviv (Israel)	166–165	(Socialist Federal Republic of Yugoslavia) Radnički Belgrade	86–82	80–83
Jollycolombani Forlì (Italy)	149–155	(France) Orthez	76–68	73–87
Vasas (Hungary)	136–150	(Spain) Joventut Freixenet	78–71	58–79
Team Fiat Stars (England)	150–158	(Italy) Superga Mestre	86–79	64–79
CEP Fleurus (Belgium)	174–195	(Socialist Federal Republic of Yugoslavia) Borac Čačak	89–84	85–111
Ziraat Fakültesi (Turkey)	129–255	(Socialist Federal Republic of Yugoslavia) Cibona	67–120	62–135
AEK (Greece)	154–174	(West Germany) Wolfenbüttel	80–77	74–97
Tofaş (Turkey)	171–164	(Belgium) Éveil Monceau	99–75	72–89

Automatically qualified to round of 16

- (Italy) Arrigoni Rieti
- (Socialist Federal Republic of Yugoslavia) Jugoplastika
- (Greece) Olympiacos
- (Belgium) Standard Liège

== Round of 16 ==
Key to colors
Top place in each group advance to semifinals

=== Group A ===
	Team	Pld	Pts	W	L	PF	PA	PD
1.	(Socialist Federal Republic of Yugoslavia) Cibona	6	11	5	1	576	531	+45
2.	(Spain) Cotonificio	6	10	4	2	547	524	+23
3.	(France) Orthez	6	9	3	3	513	507	+6
4.	(West Germany) Wolfenbüttel	6	6	0	6	466	540	−74

=== Group B ===
	Team	Pld	Pts	W	L	PF	PA	PD
1.	(Italy) Arrigoni Rieti	6	12	6	0	568	477	+91
2.	(Greece) Olympiacos	6	9	3	3	501	459	+42
3.	(Spain) Joventut Freixenet	6	9	3	3	487	462	+25
4.	(Turkey) Tofaş	6	6	0	6	425	583	−158

=== Group C ===
	Team	Pld	Pts	W	L	PF	PA	PD
1.	(Israel) Hapoel Tel Aviv	6	9	3	3	549	524	+25
2.	(Italy) Antonini Siena	6	9	3	3	533	518	+15
3.	(Socialist Federal Republic of Yugoslavia) Borac Čačak	6	9	3	3	542	547	−5
4.	(France) ASPO Tours	6	9	3	3	550	585	−35

=== Group D ===
	Team	Pld	Pts	W	L	PF	PA	PD
1.	(Socialist Federal Republic of Yugoslavia) Jugoplastika	6	12	6	0	590	527	+63
2.	(Italy) Superga Mestre	6	9	3	3	530	540	−10
3.	(Spain) Miñón Valladolid	6	8	2	4	586	607	−21
4.	(Belgium) Standard Liège	6	7	1	5	551	583	−32

== Semi finals ==
Team 1	Agg.	Team 2	1st leg	2nd leg
Hapoel Tel Aviv (Israel)	161–172	(Socialist Federal Republic of Yugoslavia) Cibona	81–80	80–92
Arrigoni Rieti (Italy)	183–179	(Socialist Federal Republic of Yugoslavia) Jugoplastika	86–75	97–104

== Final ==
March 26, Country Hall du Sart Tilman, Liège

Team 1	Score	Team 2
Arrigoni Rieti (Italy)	76–71	(Socialist Federal Republic of Yugoslavia) Cibona

1979–80 FIBA Korać Cup Champions

Arrigoni Rieti
1st title
