= Ionikos Nikaias B.C. =

Greek basketball club

Ionikos Nikaias
- Nickname: King; Blue–Whites
- Leagues: National League 1
- Founded: 1965; 61 years ago
- History: Ionikos Nikaias B.C. (1965–present)
- Arena: Nikaias Platonas Indoor Hall
- Capacity: 1,200
- Location: Nikaia, Greece
- Team colors: White and Blue
- Team manager: Apostolos Koutroulias
- Head coach: Angelos Tsikliras
- 2024-25 position: 1st (Greek C Basket League)
- Championships: 2 Greek 2nd Division (1975 (B), 2019 (A2)); 1 Greek 3rd Division (2018)
- Website: ionikosbasket.gr
Home	Away

Ionikos Nikaias B.C. (Greek: Iωνικός Νίκαιας K.A.E.) is a Greek professional basketball club that is located in Nikaia, a suburban town within the Piraeus, agglomeration, which in turn is also a part of the Athens agglomeration. The club was founded in 1965. It is a part of the A.O. Ionikos Nikaias (Α.Ο. Ιωνικός Νίκαιας) multi-sports club. The team's colors are white and blue. The team plays in the Greek B basket league.

== Logos ==
(A.O. Ionikos Nikaias' official 1965 club logo.)

(Ionikos Nikaias B.C.'s official logo –2018.)

(Ionikos Nikaias B.C.'s official logo 2018–2020.)

== History ==
=== Early years ===
Ionikos Nikaias' men's basketball club was founded in 1965, and it played its first game in 1966, during the 1966–67 season. Over the years, the club has featured Greek players such as: Panagiotis Giannakis, Fotis Katsikaris, Nikos Oikonomou, Vangelis Margaritis, Vassilis Kavvadas, and Marios Batis. Ionikos Nikaias played in the Greek 2nd Division for the first time, in the 1972–73 season. The club won the Greek 2nd Division first group in the 1974–75 season, and was thus promoted to the top-tier level Greek League, for the first time, for the 1975–76 season.

The club made 12 consecutive season appearances in the top-tier level Greek Basket League, during the 1970s and 1980s period, from the 1975–76 season, to the 1986–87 season. The club also competed in the 3rd-tier level European-wide competition, the FIBA Korać Cup, in both the 1979–80 and 1984–85 seasons.

On January 24, 1981, Ionikos Nikaias, led by a then 22-year-old Giannakis, played against Aris Thessaloniki, which was led at the time by Nikos Galis. Aris won in a tight game, by a score of 114–113. The game is memorable in the history of Greek pro club basketball, because in the game, Giannakis scored 73 points, and Galis scored 62 points, achieving the 2nd and 4th most points scored in a single game of the Greek League basketball championship.

On August 3, 1984, Ionikos Nikaias transferred its club star Panagiotis Giannakis, to the Greek club Aris Thessaloniki. Aris paid Ionikos Nikaias a transfer fee for his player rights, in the amount of 42 million Greek Drachmas, which was considered a huge amount of money for a transfer at that time. In order to complete the transfer, Giannakis also personally received a BMW car, a sporting goods store, and 8 million drachmas from Aris.

=== Recent years ===
Ionikos Nikaias won the Greek 3rd Division south conference in the 2017–18 season, and thus earned a league promotion to the Greek 2nd Division, for the 2018–19 season. That marked the first time the club had played in the Greek 2nd Division, since the 2003–04 season. In the 2018–19 season, Ionikos won the Greek 2nd Division (A2) championship, and was promoted up to the first tier level Greek Basket League, for the 2019–20 season. That marked the first time the club had played in Greece's first division, since the 1986–87 season.

== Arenas ==
Ionikos' long-time home arena (1970–2018, 2020–present) is the Nikaias Platonas Indoor Hall (Greek: Κλειστό Γυμναστήριο Πλάτων Νικαίας), which is an indoor arena that is located in Nikaia, Piraeus, Athens, and has a seating capacity of 1,200 people. Platonas Gymnasium was renovated in 2020. For the Greek Basket League 2019–20 season, while the arena was being renovated, Ionikos moved into the Sofia Befon Indoor Hall, which is located in Palaio Faliro, Piraeus, Athens, and has a seating capacity of 1,204 people.

== Honors and titles ==
=== Domestic competitions ===
- Greek 2nd Division (B) / Greek 2nd Division (A2) Champion: (2) (1974–75 B), (2018–19 A2)
- Greek 3rd Division Champion: (1) (2017–18)
- Greek C Basket League Group 3 Champion: (1) (2024-25)

=== European competitions ===
- Participant in FIBA Korać Cup (3rd-tier): (2) (1979–80, 1984–85)

== Roster ==
Ionikos Nikaias B.C. roster
Players
Coaches

Pos.	No.	Nat.	Name	Ht.	Wt.	Age
SF	7	(Greece)	Petanidis, Giorgos	1.99 m (6 ft 6 in)		23 – 20 March 2003
G	10	(Greece)	Korkontzelos, Kostas	1.93 m (6 ft 4 in)		22 – 23 April 2004

Head coach

- (Greece) Angelos Tsikliras

Assistant coach(es)

- (Greece) Foivos Kostis
- (Greece) Apostolos Koutroulias

Legend

- (C) Team captain
- Injured

- Roster
Updated: 29 May 2023

== Notable players ==
Note: Flags indicate national team eligibility at FIBA-sanctioned events. Players may hold other non-FIBA nationalities not displayed.

Criteria

To appear in this section a player must have either:

- Set a club record or won an individual award while at the club
- Played at least one official international match for their national team at any time
- Played at least one official NBA match at any time.

Greece:

- (Greece) Nikos Arsenopoulos
- (Greece) Giannis Athinaiou
- (Greece) Marios Batis
- (Greece) Dimitris Bogdanos
- (Greece) Vassilis Charalampopoulos
- (Greece) Nikos Chougkaz
- (Greece) Ioannis Dimakos
- (Greece) Panagiotis Giannakis
- (Greece) Costis Gontikas
- (Greece) Georgios Kalafatakis
- (Greece) Andreas Kanonidis
- (Greece) Vangelis Karampoulas
- (Greece) Fotis Katsikaris
- (Greece) Sotiris Katoufas
- (Greece) Vassilis Kavvadas
- (Greece) Iosif Koloveros
- (Greece) Dimitris Kompodietas
- (Greece) Nikos Liakopoulos
- (Greece) Dimitris Lolas
- (Greece) Vangelis Mantzaris
- (Greece) Vangelis Margaritis
- (Greece) Loukas Mavrokefalidis
- (Greece) Iakovos Milentigievits
- (Greece) Nikos Oikonomou
- (Greece) Michael Paragyios
- (Greece) Christos Petrodimopoulos
- (Greece) Andreas Petropoulos
- (Greece) Ioannis Sachpatzidis
- (Greece) Vangelis Sakellariou
- (Greece) Sofoklis Schortsanitis
- (Greece) Vassilis Toliopoulos
- (Greece) Fotis Vasilopoulos

Europe:

- (France) / (Greece) Angelo Tsagarakis
- (Bosnia and Herzegovina) / (Canada) Diego Kapelan
- (Netherlands) Roeland Schaftenaar
- (Turkey) Muhaymin Mustafa

United States:

- (United States) / (Ukraine) Steve Burtt Jr.
- (United States) Jordan Callahan
- (United States) Toarlyn Fitzpatrick
- (United States) Eugene German
- (United States) Daniel Hamilton
- (United States) Jeremy Hollowell
- (United States) Jamal Jones
- (United States) DaVonté Lacy
- (United States) Lucky Jones
- (United States) Eugene Lawrence
- (United States) Josh Owens
- (United States) Terell Parks
- (United States) Sayeed Pridgett
- (United States) Adam Smith
- (United States) B. J. Stith
- (United States) Nick Zeisloft

== Head coaches ==
Head Coach	Years
(Greece) Nikos Oikonomou	2015–2016
(Greece) Nikos Vetoulas	2018–2019, 2019
(Greece) Stergios Koufos	2019–2020
(Greece) Vangelis Angelou	2020–2021
(Greece) Angelos Tsikliras	2021
(Spain) Curro Segura	2021–2022
(Greece) Angelos Tsikliras	2022
(Greece) Kostas Mexas	2022–2023
(Greece) Giannis Livanos	2023
(Greece) Angelos Tsikliras	2023
(Greece) Foivos Kostis	2023
(Greece) Angelos Tsikliras	2023

== Season by season ==
Season	Tier	Division	Pos.	Greek Cup	European competitions
1972–73	2	B Basket League	--		
1973–74	2	B Basket League	2nd		
1974–75	2	B Basket League	1st		
1975–76	1	Basket League	7th		
1976–77	1	Basket League	7th		
1977–78	1	Basket League	5th		
1978–79	1	Basket League	6th		
1979–80	1	Basket League	11th		3 Korać Cup First round
1980–81	1	Basket League	8th		
1981–82	1	Basket League	12th		
1982–83	1	Basket League	8th		
1983–84	1	Basket League	6th		
1984–85	1	Basket League	9th		3 Korać Cup First round
1985–86	1	Basket League	8th		
1986–87	1	Basket League	10th		
1987–88	2	A2 Basket League	6th		
1988–89	2	A2 Basket League	6th		
1989–90	2	A2 Basket League	8th		
1990–91	2	A2 Basket League	4th		
1991–92	2	A2 Basket League	5th		
1992–93	2	A2 Basket League	5th		
1993–94	2	A2 Basket League	3rd		
1994–95	2	A2 Basket League	6th		
1995–96	2	A2 Basket League	9th		
1996–97	2	A2 Basket League	14th		
1997–98	3	B Basket League	9th		
1998–99	3	B Basket League	2nd		
1999–00	2	A2 Basket League	8th		
2000–01	2	A2 Basket League	3rd		
2001–02	2	A2 Basket League	11th		
2002–03	2	A2 Basket League	6th		
2003–04	2	A2 Basket League	13th		
2004–05	3	B Basket League	7th		
2005–06	3	B Basket League	12th		
2006–07	3	B Basket League	14th		
2007–08	4	C Basket League	7th		
2008–09	4	C Basket League	10th		
2009–10	4	C Basket League	10th		
2010–11	5	ESKANA A1	4th		
2011–12	5	ESKANA A1	1st		
2012–13	4	C Basket League	2nd		
2013–14	3	B Basket League	3rd		
2014–15	3	B Basket League	7th	2014–15	
2015–16	3	B Basket League	2nd	2015–16	
2016–17	3	B Basket League	5th	2016–17	
2017–18	3	B Basket League	1st	2017–18	
2018–19	2	A2 Basket League	1st	2018–19	
2019–20	1	Basket League	10th	2019–20	
2020–21	1	Basket League	8th	2020–21	

== See also ==
- A.O. Ionikos Nikaias (multi-sport club)
- Ionikos Nikaias F.C. (football club)
