= Kostas Charalampidis =

Kostas Charalampidis may refer to:

- Constantinos Charalambidis (born 1981), Cypriot professional footballer
- Kostas Charalampidis (basketball) (born 1976), Greek professional basketball player
