= Tzanis Stavrakopoulos =

Greek basketball player

Personal information
- Born: October 30, 1971 (age 55) Athens, Greece
- Listed height: 6 ft 7.5 in (2.02 m)
- Listed weight: 230 lb (104 kg)

Career information
- Playing career: 1993–2005
- Position: Small forward / power forward
- Number: 7, 13, 15

Career history
- 1993–1995: Ampelokipoi
- 1995–1996: Panathinaikos
- 1996–1997: Aris
- 1997–1998: Le Mans
- 1998–1999: Panionios
- 2000–2001: Dafni
- 2001–2002: Ionikos NF
- 2003–2004: Panionios
- 2004–2005: Peristeri

Career highlights
- EuroLeague champion (1996); FIBA Korać Cup champion (1997); Greek League All-Star (1994 II); Greek 2nd Division champion (1994); Greek 2nd Division Top Scorer (1994); Greek 3rd Division champion (1993); Greek 3rd Division Top Scorer (1993); Greek 4th Division champion (1992); Greek 4th Division Top Scorer (1992)

Tzanis Stavrakopoulos (Greek: Τζαννής Σταυρακόπουλος) (born October 30, 1971) is a Greek former professional basketball player. At a height of 2.02 m (6'7 1/2"), he played at the small forward and power forward positions.

== Professional career ==
Stavrakopoulos started his club playing career with Ampelokipoi, in the Greek minors, at the age of 16. He led the team to be promoted all the way up from the local ESKA category, to the top-tier A1 professional level Greek League. In 1995, he moved to the Greek club Panathinaikos Athens, and with them he won the EuroLeague championship, at the 1996 EuroLeague Final Four.

In the next season, he played with Aris Thessaloniki. With Aris, he won the championship of the FIBA Korać Cup's 1996–97 season. In the 1997–98 season, he played for the French League club Le Mans, and one year later, he played for the Greek club Panionios. Stavrakopoulos also played with the Greek clubs Dafni, Ionikos NF, and Peristeri, where he played during the Greek 2nd Division's 2004–05 season.

After that, Stavrakopoulos played for several more teams in the Greek minors.

== National team career ==
Stavrakopoulos played with Greece's junior national team at the 1993 FIBA Under-21 World Cup. He also played with the senior Greek national team at the 1995 EuroBasket.
