= KK Vinkovci =

- Leagues: HKS 2
- Founded: 1963
- History: 1963–..... Vinkovci.....-96; Dinamo Vinkovci; 1996-99; Telecomp Vinkovci; 1999-present Vinkovci
- Arena: Lenije
- Capacity: 1,500
- Location: Vinkovci, Croatia
- Team colors: Deep blue & White
- Website: asvel.com
Home	Away

Košarkaški Klub Vinkovci ("Vinkovci Basketball Club") is a Croatian basketball team from Vinkovci.

== History ==
KK Vinkovci was founded on October 8, 1963. In its history, the club changed its name several times - KK Vinkovci, KK Dinamo Vinkovci, KK Telecomp Vinkovci and still exists under the original name KK Vinkovci. The first name was changed to Dinamo, then in TELECOMP, after the club, which financially was closely linked to the failed bank from Vinkovci, basketball is in the Bosutu organized game under the original name. The club plays its home games in the Basketball hall "Lenije" in Vinkovci. The club enjoyed substantial success in the 1990s when they played very well and recorded historical accomplishments.

== Notable players ==
- (Croatia) Mario Kasun
- (Croatia) Nino Primorac
- (Croatia) Ivan Papac
- (Croatia) Sanjin Kalaica
