= Ampelokipoi B.C. =

- Nickname: Το τρένο των Αμπελοκήπων (The Ampelokipi train); Αμπελογκάρντεν (); ΑΟΑ
- Founded: 1929
- History: 1929 – Present
- Location: Ampelokipoi, Athens, Greece
- Team colors: Green and White
- Championships: Greek 2nd Division champion (1994); Greek 3rd Division champion (1993); Greek 4th Division champion (1992)
Home	Away

Ampelokipoi B.C. or Ampelokipi B.C. (Greek: Α.Ο. Αμπελοκήπων, Αμπελόκηποι) is a Greek basketball club that is based in the Athenian neighborhood Ampelokipoi. It plays in the third local division (Γ ΕΣΚΑ), but in the past it has played in the top-tier Greek Basket League for two seasons. The club's colours are green and white, and its emblem is three circles, like Olympic circles.

== History ==
Ampelokipoi was founded in 1929, originally as Hephaestus Athens. In the first post-war years, the club was renamed to Athletic Union of Ampelokipoi, and in the year 1954, the club merged with Niki Ampelokipoi, and was then renamed to Ampelokipoi Athletic Club. The club had departments in all popular sports in Greece: football, basketball, and volleyball. But the club was in the shadow of the nearby Panathinaikos club.

Only during the 1990s, did the basketball team have some success, when it had Georgios Kalafatakis as head coach, and was promoted up through five division levels in five seasons, ultimately reaching the top-tier Greek Basket League. Ampelokipoi played in the top-tier Greek Basket League for two seasons (1994–95 and 1995–96), having notable players such as Tzanis Stavrakopoulos, Giorgos Floros, Lawrence Funderburke, and Ashraf Amaya in the team. After losing the most notable players of the team, the club then played in the Greek 2nd Division for the two next seasons.

In those following years, the club's most notable player was Theo Papaloukas. Over the following years, Ampelokipoi started on a decline period, and the team ended up down in the local regional divisions.

== Honours and titles ==
=== Domestic competitions ===
- Greek 2nd Division

Champions (1): 1993–94

- Greek 3rd Division

Champions (1): 1992–93

- Greek 4th Division

Champions (1): 1991–92

== Notable players ==
Note: Flags indicate national team eligibility at FIBA-sanctioned events. Players may hold other non-FIBA nationalities not displayed.

Criteria

To appear in this section a player must have either:

- Set a club record or won an individual award while at the club
- Played at least one official international match for their national team at any time
- Played at least one official NBA match at any time.

Greece:

- (Greece) Giorgos Floros
- (Greece) Panagiotis Maragopoulos
- (Greece) Theo Papaloukas
- (Greece) Tzanis Stavrakopoulos
- (Greece) Dimitrios Papadakis

Americas:

- (United States) Ashraf Amaya
- (United States) Lawrence Funderburke
- (United States) Aaron Williams
- (The Bahamas) Ian Lockhart

== Head coaches ==
- (Greece) Georgios Kalafatakis

== Men's football club ==
Ampelokipoi's football team, Ampelokipoi F.C. did not manage to have the same kind of successes as the basketball club did. In 2003, the football team of Ampelokipoi merged with the local team Pyrsos, and was then renamed to Athletic Culture Club of Ampelokipoi (Αθλητικός Πολιτιστικός Σύλλογος Αμπελοκήπων).
