= Ionikos N.F. B.C. =

Ionikos NF
- Founded: 1930 (Parent Athletic Association)
- History: Ionikos Nea Filadelfeia (1930–2004); Ionikos N.F. Amaliada (2004–2005); Ionikos Nea Filadelfeia (2005–Present)
- Arena: Ionikos Nea Filadelfeia "Zacharias Alexandrou" Indoor Hall
- Capacity: 1,500
- Location: Nea Filadelfeia, Athens, Greece
- Team colors: White and Blue
- Website: www.basketball.ionikosnf.gr
Home	Away

Ionikos N.F. B.C. is a Greek professional basketball club that is based in Nea Filadelfeia, a suburb of Athens, Greece. The club's full name is Ionikos Neas Filadelfeias Basketball Club (English: Ionian New Philadelphia). The basketball club is a part of A.S. Ionikos Neas Filadelfeias.

== History ==
Ionikos N.F. played in Greece's top-tier level, the Greek Basket League, from 2001 to 2005. In 2004, Ionikos moved to Amaliada, Greece, and was named Ionikos N.F. Amaliada, but the team returned to Nea Filadelfeia, Greece, at the end of the 2004–05 season. In the 2003–04 season, Ionikos played in the European 2nd-tier level EuroCup, and in the 2004–05 season, Ionikos played in the European 3rd-tier level FIBA EuroChallenge.

== Arenas ==
When the club was based in Amaliada, Greece, during the 2004–05 season, they played their home games at the 2,500 seat Amaliada Indoor Hall.

== Notable players ==
Note: Flags indicate national team eligibility at FIBA-sanctioned events. Players may hold other non-FIBA nationalities not displayed.

Criteria

To appear in this section a player must have either:

- Set a club record or won an individual award while at the club
- Played at least one official international match for their national team at any time
- Played at least one official NBA match at any time.

Greece:

- (Greece) Antonis Asimakopoulos
- (Greece) Georgios Bosganas
- (Greece) Periklis Dorkofikis
- (Greece) Georgios Filippakis
- (Greece) Georgios Giannouzakos
- (Greece) Michalis Kakiouzis
- (Greece) Apostolos Kontos
- (Greece) Georgios Limniatis
- (Greece) / (Serbia) Sasa Marcović
- (Greece) Makis Nikolaidis
- (Greece) Nikos Papanikolopoulos
- (Greece) Spyros Panteliadis
- (Greece) Michalis Perrakis
- (Greece) / (Serbia) Miloš Šakota
- (Greece) Vassilis Soulis
- (Greece) Tzanis Stavrakopoulos
- (Greece) Aris Tatarounis
- (Greece) Alexios Tsioumpris
- (Greece) Nikos Vetoulas

Europe:

- (Slovenia) Teoman Alibegović
- (Germany) Michael Koch
- (North Macedonia) Mirza Kurtović
- (Finland) Antti Nikkilä
- (Croatia) Jurica Žuža

Rest of Americas:

- (Puerto Rico) Larry Ayuso

USA:

- (United States) Antoine Carr
- (United States) Robert Conley
- (United States) Tony Dawson
- (United States) Eddie Gill
- (United States) / (Belgium) Justin Hamilton
- (United States) Charles Jones
- (United States) Carl Thomas
- (United States) Kenyan Weaks

== Head coaches ==
- (Greece) Nikos Oikonomou
