= 1984–85 FIBA Korać Cup =

- League: FIBA Korać Cup
- Sport: Basketball

Final
- Champions: (Italy) Simac Milano
- Runners-up: (Italy) Ciaocrem Varese

FIBA Korać Cup seasons
- ← 1983–84 1985–86 →

The 1984–54 FIBA Korać Cup was the 14th edition of FIBA's Korać Cup basketball competition. The Italian Simac Milano defeated the Italian Ciaocrem Varese in the final on March 21, 1985 in Brussels, Belgium.

== First round ==
Team 1	Agg.	Team 2	1st leg	2nd leg
İTÜ (Turkey)	161–165	(Bulgaria) Akademik Varna	71–96	90–69
Keravnos (Cyprus)	113–199	(Greece) Panionios	55–115	58–84
Team Glasgow (Scotland)	166–212	(Spain) Licor 43	86–108	80–104
Cars Warrington (England)	163–142	(Belgium) Standard Liège	78–74	85–68
Aris (Greece)	207–166	(Bulgaria) Levski-Spartak	90–66	117–100
Sutton & Crystal Palace (England)	157–169	(Netherlands) Doppeldouche Den Helder	80–89	77–80
Amicale (Luxembourg)	137–150	(Austria) Regenerin Klagenfurt	71–68	66–82
Maes Pils (Belgium)	146–148	(Spain) Clesa Ferrol	81–72	65–76
Sparta Bertrange (Luxembourg)	156–208	(France) Stade Français	85–106	71–102
ZTE (Hungary)	139–152	(Turkey) Fenerbahçe	84–78	55–74
Ionikos Nikaias (Greece)	148–189	(Israel) Hapoel Haifa	74–77	74–112

== Second round ==
Team 1	Agg.	Team 2	1st leg	2nd leg
Akademik Varna (Bulgaria)	158–174	(Soviet Union) Stroitel Kyiv	65–66	93–108
Panionios (Greece)	142–175	(Italy) Ciaocrem Varese	67–91	75–84
Licor 43 (Spain)	175–157	(France) Olympique Antibes	88–72	87–85
Cars Warrington (England)	152–162	(Italy) Birra Peroni Livorno	87–69	65–93
Aris (Greece)	173–165	(Socialist Federal Republic of Yugoslavia) Zadar	84–71	89–94
Doppeldouche Den Helder (Netherlands)	183–196	(Belgium) Renault Gent	82–81	101–115
Regenerin Klagenfurt (Austria)	152–196	(Spain) Cajamadrid	82–98	70–98
Clesa Ferrol (Spain)	172–144	(Greece) AEK	82–67	90–77
Stade Français (France)	183–158	(Israel) Hapoel Ramat Gan	96–83	87–75
Fenerbahçe (Turkey)	178–171	(Socialist Federal Republic of Yugoslavia) Borac Čačak	93–82	85–89
Hapoel Haifa (Israel)	199–197	(Socialist Federal Republic of Yugoslavia) Šibenka	105–100	94–97
Assubel Mariembourg (Belgium)	166–185	(France) Moderne	88–76	78–109

Automatically qualified to round of 16

- (France) Orthez (title holder)
- (Socialist Federal Republic of Yugoslavia) Crvena zvezda
- (Italy) Jollycolombani Cantù
- (Italy) Simac Milano

== Round of 16 ==
Key to colors
Top place in each group advance to semifinals

=== Group A ===
	Team	Pld	Pts	W	L	PF	PA	PD
1.	(Socialist Federal Republic of Yugoslavia) Crvena zvezda	6	11	5	1	593	526	+67
2.	(Italy) Jollycolombani Cantù	6	11	5	1	599	536	+63
3.	(Spain) Licor 43	6	8	2	4	556	569	−13
4.	(Israel) Hapoel Haifa	6	6	0	6	504	621	−117

=== Group B ===
	Team	Pld	Pts	W	L	PF	PA	PD
1.	(Italy) Simac Milano	6	12	6	0	606	524	+82
2.	(Soviet Union) Stroitel Kyiv	6	10	4	2	540	496	+44
3.	(France) Stade Français	6	8	2	4	569	592	−23
4.	(Turkey) Fenerbahçe	6	6	0	6	496	599	−103

=== Group C ===
	Team	Pld	Pts	W	L	PF	PA	PD
1.	(Italy) Ciaocrem Varese	6	11	5	1	572	472	+100
2.	(France) Orthez	6	11	5	1	571	487	+84
3.	(Spain) Clesa Ferrol	6	7	1	5	536	565	−29
4.	(Belgium) Renault Gent	6	7	1	5	473	628	−155

=== Group D ===
	Team	Pld	Pts	W	L	PF	PA	PD
1.	(Greece) Aris	6	10	4	2	582	538	+44
2.	(Italy) Birra Peroni Livorno	6	10	4	2	563	544	+19
3.	(Spain) Cajamadrid	6	9	3	3	543	551	−8
4.	(France) Moderne	6	7	1	5	544	599	−55

== Semi finals ==
Team 1	Agg.	Team 2	1st leg	2nd leg
Simac Milano (Italy)	209–185	(Socialist Federal Republic of Yugoslavia) Crvena zvezda	109–86	100–99
Aris (Greece)	151–172	(Italy) Ciaocrem Varese	80–77	71–95

== Final ==
March 21, Palais du Midi, Brussels

Team 1	Score	Team 2
Ciaocrem Varese (Italy)	78–91	(Italy) Simac Milano

1984–85 FIBA Korać Cup Champions

Simac Milano
1st title
