= Massimo Cancellieri =

Italian basketball coach (born 1972)

Tofaş
- Position: Head coach
- League: Basketbol Süper Ligi

Personal information
- Born: 24 July 1972 (age 54) Teramo, Italy
- Coaching career: 1994–present

Career history

Coaching
- 2004–2005: Montecatini (assistant)
- 2005–2006: Montecatini
- 2006–2009: Pallacanestro Biella (assistant)
- 2009–2010: Veroli Basket
- 2010–2013: Pallacanestro Biella
- 2013–2019: Olimpia Milano (assistant)
- 2019–2021: Basket Ravenna
- 2021–2023: Limoges CSP
- 2023–2024: SIG Strasbourg
- 2024–2025: PAOK Thessaloniki
- 2025–2026: Aquila Basket Trento
- 2026–present: Tofaş

Career highlights
- Greek Basket League Coach of the Year (2025); FIBA Europe Cup runner-up (2025)

Massimo Cancellieri (born 24 July 1972) is an Italian professional basketball coach who is the head coach of Tofaş of the Turkish Basketbol Süper Ligi. During his career, he has coached clubs in Italy, France, Greece and Turkey and spent six seasons as an assistant coach with Olimpia Milano.

In the 2024–25 season, Cancellieri guided PAOK Thessaloniki to the 2024–25 FIBA Europe Cup Final and was subsequently named Greek Basket League Coach of the Year.

== Coaching career ==
=== Early career in Italy ===
Cancellieri was born in Teramo on 24 July 1972 and became involved in coaching at a young age. He began his coaching career in the mid-1990s, initially working at youth and assistant-coaching level.

After early experiences with clubs including San Raffaele and Teramo, he joined Montecatini, initially as an assistant before becoming head coach for the 2005–06 season.

Cancellieri subsequently joined Pallacanestro Biella, working with the club in Italy's top division from 2006. In 2009, he became head coach of Veroli Basket and guided the club to second place in the Italian second division.

He returned to Biella as head coach in 2010 and remained in charge for three seasons.

=== Olimpia Milano (2013–2019) ===
In 2013, Cancellieri joined Olimpia Milano as an assistant coach. He spent six consecutive seasons with the club, working under Luca Banchi, Jasmin Repeša and Simone Pianigiani.

During his time in Milan, Olimpia won three Italian League championships, in 2014, 2016 and 2018, two Italian Cups, in 2016 and 2017, and three consecutive Italian Supercups from 2016 to 2018.

His six seasons with Milano also gave him extensive experience in the EuroLeague.

=== Ravenna (2019–2021) ===
Cancellieri returned to a head-coaching role in 2019 when he took charge of Basket Ravenna. He spent two seasons with the club.

In his first season, Ravenna was among the leading teams in Italy's second division before the campaign was interrupted by the COVID-19 pandemic.

=== Limoges CSP (2021–2023) ===
In 2021, Cancellieri moved outside Italy for the first time in his career, becoming head coach of French club Limoges CSP.

He spent two seasons at Limoges and led the club to the French league playoffs. His contract was extended during his tenure before the two sides parted ways following the 2022–23 season.

=== SIG Strasbourg (2023–2024) ===
On 29 May 2023, Cancellieri signed a two-year contract to become head coach of SIG Strasbourg.

During the 2023–24 season, Strasbourg advanced to the Top 16 of the Basketball Champions League and reached the French Cup Final. The club finished 12th in the French league with a 15–19 record.

On 1 June 2024, Cancellieri and Strasbourg mutually agreed to terminate the remaining year of his contract.

=== PAOK Thessaloniki (2024–2025) ===
On 9 June 2024, Cancellieri was appointed head coach of PAOK Thessaloniki for the 2024–25 season.

Under Cancellieri, PAOK produced its strongest European campaign in several years. After beginning the season in the Basketball Champions League qualifying rounds, the club entered the 2024–25 FIBA Europe Cup and advanced to the Final.

PAOK faced Bilbao Basket in the two-legged final. After losing the first game 72–65 in Bilbao, PAOK won the second leg 84–82 in Thessaloniki, but Bilbao won the title 154–149 on aggregate.

In the 2024–25 Greek Basket League, PAOK reached the playoffs and took its quarter-final series against AEK Athens to a deciding third game, where it was eliminated after overtime.

Following the season, PAOK attempted to renew his contract, but Cancellieri informed the club that he wished to continue his career elsewhere.

On 3 July 2025, Cancellieri was named the Greek Basket League Coach of the Year. He received the most votes from the league's head coaches and team captains.

=== Aquila Basket Trento (2025–2026) ===
On 25 May 2025, Cancellieri signed a two-year contract with Aquila Basket Trento, returning to Italy after four consecutive seasons abroad.

During the 2025–26 season, he guided Trento to the quarter-finals of the EuroCup and into the Italian League playoffs.

In April 2026, the club announced that Cancellieri would leave at the conclusion of the season despite initially having another year remaining on his contract.

=== Tofaş (2026–present) ===
On 27 May 2026, Turkish club Tofaş announced Cancellieri as its new head coach ahead of the 2026–27 season. The move marked his first coaching position in Turkey.

== Coaching style ==
Cancellieri has generally been associated with an intense and defense-oriented approach. During his presentation at Strasbourg, he emphasized defensive aggression, physicality and the importance of all players contributing defensively.
