= Sakis Giannakopoulos =

Greek basketball player and coach

Sakis Giannakopoulos Σάκης Γιαννακόπουλος
Personal information
- Born: October 24, 1982 (age 44) Kalamata, Greece
- Listed height: 6 ft 4.75 in (1.95 m)
- Listed weight: 194 lb (88 kg)

Career information
- NBA draft: 2004: undrafted
- Playing career: 2010–2018
- Position: Shooting guard / Small forward
- Coaching career: 2018–present

Career history

Playing
- 2010–2018: Lavrio

Coaching
- 2018–2023: Lavrio (assistant)

Career highlights
- As player: Greek 2nd Division MVP (2011); Greek 3rd Division champion (2010); Greek 4th Division champion (2007)
Medals
Men's basketball
Representing Greece
FIBA Europe Under-18 Championship
Bronze medal – third place	2000 Croatia	Under-18

Dionysios "Sakis" Giannakopoulos (alternate spelling: Dionysis; Greek: Διονύσης "Σάκης" Γιαννακόπουλος; born October 24, 1982) is a former Greek professional basketball player and current assistant coach for Lavrio of the Greek League, where he spent the majority of his playing career. He was a 6 ft 4 3/4 in (1.949 m) shooting guard / small forward.

== Professional career ==
Giannakopoulos played club basketball in the Greek minors with Panelefsiniakos (2000–2001), Poseidonas Kalamatas (2001–2004), and Lavrio (2004–2010). He started his pro career with Lavrio, in the Greek 2nd Division, in the 2010–11 season. He was voted the Greek 2nd Division's MVP that same season.

With Lavrio, he played in the top-tier level Greek Basket League, for the first time, during the 2015–16 season. He was Lavrio's long-time team captain. Giannakopoulos played in over 150 games with Lavrio, and he is the record holder of the club in most games played.

After playing 3 seasons with Lavrio in Greece's top-tier level league, he retired from playing professional basketball in 2018.

== National team career ==
Giannakopoulos was a member of the junior national teams of Greece. With Greece's junior national team, he played at the 2000 FIBA Europe Under-18 Championship, where he won a bronze medal.

== Coaching career ==
On August 7, 2018, Lavrio announced that Giannakopoulos was retiring from playing professional basketball and joining the team's coaching staff as an assistant coach.
