= Nikolaos Vezyrtzis =

Greek sports executive (born 1946)

- Νικόλαος Βεζυρτζής
- Born: 5 November 1946 (age 79)
- Other name: Nikos Vezyrtzis
- Occupation: Sports executive
- Known for: Long-time executive and president of P.A.O.K.

Nikolaos "Nikos" Vezyrtzis (Greek: Νικόλαος «Νίκος» Βεζυρτζής; born 5 November 1946) is a Greek sports executive best known for his long association with P.A.O.K.. He has held senior administrative positions across the club's football, basketball and amateur departments and is particularly associated with the rise of PAOK's basketball team during the late 1980s and early 1990s.

During his first period leading PAOK's basketball department, the club won the 1990–91 FIBA European Cup Winners' Cup and the 1991–92 Greek Basket League, reached the European Cup Winners' Cup Final again in 1992 and qualified for the 1993 FIBA European League Final Four.

Vezyrtzis later held senior positions with PAOK FC, including during the late 1990s and as president during the club's financial crisis in 2006–07. He returned to PAOK FC as vice-president in 2015–16 and, more than three decades after the beginning of his first basketball presidency, returned as president of PAOK BC in December 2025. He remained in office until his departure from the board on 11 May 2026.

== Administrative career ==
=== Early involvement with PAOK ===
Vezyrtzis became involved with PAOK's administration during the 1970s. His first major role was with the football department, where he worked alongside long-time PAOK president Giorgos Pantelakis as a team official.

In 1984, Vezyrtzis became heavily involved in the administration of A.C. PAOK, with particular responsibility for the club's basketball department. His period at the head of PAOK basketball coincided with the club's emergence as one of the leading teams in Greek and European basketball.

=== PAOK basketball (1984–1993) ===
Vezyrtzis led PAOK's basketball department for almost a decade. During the early years of his administration, PAOK attempted to challenge the domestic dominance of city rivals Aris, investing heavily in its playing roster and gradually becoming a regular contender for domestic and European titles.

Among the players who joined or developed into major figures during the period were Branislav Prelević, Panagiotis Fasoulas, John Korfas, Nikos Stavropoulos, Nikos Boudouris and Ken Barlow.

On 5 November 1988, the day of Vezyrtzis' 42nd birthday, PAOK defeated Aris 81–78 at Alexandreio Melathron. The victory ended Aris' streak of 80 consecutive wins against Greek opposition, which had lasted since March 1985.

The major European breakthrough came in the 1990–91 FIBA European Cup Winners' Cup. PAOK reached the final in Geneva against CAI Zaragoza and won 76–72 on 26 March 1991, securing the first European title in the basketball club's history. During the game, play was temporarily interrupted because of crowd disturbances, with Vezyrtzis and team captain Panagiotis Fasoulas addressing PAOK supporters before the game resumed.

The following season, PAOK reached the European Cup Winners' Cup Final for a second consecutive year, losing 65–63 to Real Madrid in Nantes. The club nevertheless ended the season by winning the 1991–92 Greek Basket League. PAOK finished the regular season with a 20–2 record and clinched the championship with a 97–82 victory over Olympiacos on 22 April 1992.

In 1992–93, PAOK competed in Europe's premier club competition and qualified for the 1993 FIBA European League Final Four in Athens. The club was eliminated by Benetton Treviso in the semifinal. Following the end of the season, Vezyrtzis stepped down and handed leadership of the basketball department to Apostolos Oikonomidis.

Vezyrtzis was also closely involved in efforts to provide PAOK with a permanent basketball arena. He was among the club officials who promoted the construction of a new indoor arena on land donated by the Dedeoglou family, a project which eventually resulted in the construction of the PAOK Sports Arena.

=== PAOK FC (1998–1999) ===
Vezyrtzis returned to PAOK's football administration under club owner Giorgos Batatoudis in late 1998.

On 1 December 1998, Ta Nea reported that Vezyrtzis had been appointed president of PAOK FC, with Batatoudis retaining ownership of the club. Contemporary reports continued to identify him as the club's president during the spring of 1999. Later retrospective accounts have described his position during this period as deputy president.

During this spell, Vezyrtzis was involved in footballing decisions including the departure of head coach Angelos Anastasiadis and the subsequent appointment of Arie Haan.

=== PAOK FC presidency (2006–2007) ===
Vezyrtzis returned to the club's football administration in late 2006 during a severe financial and administrative crisis. Following the departure of Giannis Goumenos, a court-appointed administration was formed and Vezyrtzis became president, working alongside former PAOK basketball executive Apostolos Oikonomidis.

On 5 December 2006, the new board was formally constituted with Vezyrtzis as president.

The administration inherited a club facing major financial problems. At a shareholders' meeting in December 2006, Vezyrtzis stated that PAOK's liabilities amounted to approximately €39 million.

Vezyrtzis remained in charge through the end of the 2006–07 season. In June 2007, he announced that he would not continue as president, clearing the way for a new administration led by former PAOK captain Theodoros Zagorakis.

=== PAOK FC vice-presidency (2015–2016) ===
Vezyrtzis returned to PAOK FC's administration in December 2015, serving as first vice-president with responsibility for the organisation and management of the football department.

His tenure lasted approximately two months. In early February 2016, Vezyrtzis submitted his resignation following disagreements concerning the operation and sporting direction of the football club.

=== Return to PAOK basketball (2025–2026) ===
More than three decades after the end of his first period leading PAOK basketball, Vezyrtzis returned to the club's administration in late 2025.

On 3 December 2025, the Thessaloniki Court of First Instance appointed a temporary administration headed by Vezyrtzis in order to ensure the uninterrupted operation of PAOK BC during a period of administrative transition. The temporary board consisted of Vezyrtzis as president, Ioannis Petmezas as deputy president and chief executive officer, and Evangelos Tsakmakas as a member.

On 17 December, following an extraordinary shareholders' meeting, Vezyrtzis was unanimously elected president of a new seven-member board of directors. Vasilios Oikonomidis was appointed vice-president and Ioannis Petmezas chief executive officer.

During Vezyrtzis' second presidency, PAOK reached an agreement with Italian coach Andrea Trinchieri, who signed a three-year contract to become the club's head coach beginning with the 2026–27 season and also became involved in the club's sporting planning during the remainder of the 2025–26 campaign.

PAOK also reached the 2025–26 FIBA Europe Cup Final during his presidency, facing Bilbao Basket for a second consecutive season. PAOK won the first leg 79–73 in Thessaloniki before losing 89–74 in Bilbao and finishing as runners-up, 162–153 on aggregate.

On 11 May 2026, Vezyrtzis left PAOK's board. In explaining his decision, he referred to his role in the club's transition and identified the agreement with Trinchieri among the most important developments during his second tenure.

Following a reorganisation of the board, Ioannis Petmezas succeeded Vezyrtzis as president while also retaining the position of chief executive officer.

== Political activity ==
Vezyrtzis has also been involved in Greek politics. In 2010, he ran for mayor in the municipality of Thermi–Neo Rysio with the support of New Democracy. He subsequently stood as a New Democracy parliamentary candidate in the Thessaloniki B constituency in 2012 and again in 2015, but was not elected.

== Recognition ==
Vezyrtzis has been honoured on several occasions for his contribution to PAOK and Greek basketball. In March 2021, he took part in PAOK BC's commemoration of the 30th anniversary of the club's 1991 European Cup Winners' Cup triumph.

He was also among the figures honoured during events celebrating the history of Greek basketball and PAOK's achievements.
