= PAOK B.C. in Europe =

P.A.O.K. B.C. history and statistics in the FIBA and ULEB competitions.

== Matches ==
Season	Competition	Round	Date	Opponent	Score (Half-time)	Qual.
1959–60	FIBA Champions Cup (1st tier)	1st round	18–11–1959	(Romania) PAOK – Steaua Bucharest	61–80 (17–37)	
1959–60	FIBA Champions Cup (1st tier)	1st round	20–12–1959	(Romania) Steaua Bucharest – PAOK	79–60 (35–22)	
1974–75	FIBA Korać Cup (3rd tier)	1st round	Bye			
1974–75	FIBA Korać Cup (3rd tier)	2nd round	26–11–1974	PAOK – Bosna Sarajevo	77–74 (41–37)	
1974–75	FIBA Korać Cup (3rd tier)	2nd round	03–12–1974	Bosna Sarajevo – PAOK	83–73 (30–33)	
1975–76	FIBA Korać Cup (3rd tier)	1st round	Bye			
1975–76	FIBA Korać Cup (3rd tier)	2nd round	18–11–1975	(France) Moderne Le Mans – PAOK	112–73 (53–33)	
1975–76	FIBA Korać Cup (3rd tier)	2nd round	25–11–1975	(France) PAOK – Moderne Le Mans	69–67 (39–27)	
1981–82	FIBA Korać Cup (3rd tier)	1st round	07–10–1981	(Austria) PAOK – Sparkasse (Stock 84) Wels	103–72 (52–40)	
1981–82	FIBA Korać Cup (3rd tier)	1st round	15–10–1981	(Austria) Sparkasse (Stock 84) Wels – PAOK	92–98 (33–38)	
1981–82	FIBA Korać Cup (3rd tier)	2nd round	04–11–1981	PAOK – Zadar	88–94 (33–40)	
1981–82	FIBA Korać Cup (3rd tier)	2nd round	11–11–1981	Zadar – PAOK	103–93 (47–45)	
1982–83	FIBA Cup Winners' Cup (2nd tier)	1st round	12–10–1982	(Cyprus) AEL Limassol – PAOK	51–120 (27–56)	
1982–83	FIBA Cup Winners' Cup (2nd tier)	1st round	14–10–1982	(Cyprus) PAOK – AEL Limassol	111–54 (56–30)	
1982–83	FIBA Cup Winners' Cup (2nd tier)	2nd round	02–11–1982	(Israel) PAOK – Hapoel Ramat Gan	86–78 (41–45)	
1982–83	FIBA Cup Winners' Cup (2nd tier)	2nd round	09–11–1982	(Israel) Hapoel Ramat Gan – PAOK	79–69 (39–37)	
1983–84	FIBA Korać Cup (3rd tier)	1st round	Bye			
1983–84	FIBA Korać Cup (3rd tier)	2nd round	26–10–1983	(Belgium) Toptours Aarschot – PAOK	87–74 (40–38)	
1983–84	FIBA Korać Cup (3rd tier)	2nd round	02–11–1983	(Belgium) PAOK – Toptours Aarschot	113–97 (63–44)	
1983–84	FIBA Korać Cup (3rd tier)	Round of 16 (group stage)	07–12–1983	Zadar – PAOK	89–80 (46–42)	
1983–84	FIBA Korać Cup (3rd tier)	Round of 16 (group stage)	14–12–1983	(Italy) Pallacanestro (Star) Varese – PAOK	93–80 (50–42)	
1983–84	FIBA Korać Cup (3rd tier)	Round of 16 (group stage)	11–01–1984	(France) PAOK – Pau Orthez	83–78 (49–47)	
1983–84	FIBA Korać Cup (3rd tier)	Round of 16 (group stage)	18–01–1984	PAOK – Zadar	67–72 (32–29)	
1983–84	FIBA Korać Cup (3rd tier)	Round of 16 (group stage)	25–01–1984	(Italy) PAOK – Pallacanestro (Star) Varese	81–80 (73–73, 38–38)	
1983–84	FIBA Korać Cup (3rd tier)	Round of 16 (group stage)	01–02–1984	(France) Pau Orthez – PAOK	73–58 (28–28)	
1984–85	FIBA Cup Winners' Cup (2nd tier)	1st round	03–10–1984	(Hungary) Csepel Budapest – PAOK	73–99 (38–51)	
1984–85	FIBA Cup Winners' Cup (2nd tier)	1st round	11–10–1984	(Hungary) PAOK – Csepel Budapest	116–81 (69–33)	
1984–85	FIBA Cup Winners' Cup (2nd tier)	2nd round	30–10–1984	PAOK – Bosna Sarajevo	88–84 (47–44)	
1984–85	FIBA Cup Winners' Cup (2nd tier)	2nd round	06–11–1984	Bosna Sarajevo – PAOK	84–82 (48–49)	
1984–85	FIBA Cup Winners' Cup (2nd tier)	Quarter finals (group stage)	04–12–1984	PAOK – Žalgiris Kaunas	72–78 (38–34)	
1984–85	FIBA Cup Winners' Cup (2nd tier)	Quarter finals (group stage)	11–12–1984	(Spain) CB (CAI) Zaragoza – PAOK	80–76 (34–42)	
1984–85	FIBA Cup Winners' Cup (2nd tier)	Quarter finals (group stage)	09–01–1985	(Austria) UBSC (Landis+Gyr) Vienna – PAOK	86–84 (48–44)	
1984–85	FIBA Cup Winners' Cup (2nd tier)	Quarter finals (group stage)	15–01–1985	Žalgiris Kaunas – PAOK	102–96 (57–43)	
1984–85	FIBA Cup Winners' Cup (2nd tier)	Quarter finals (group stage)	23–01–1985	(Spain) PAOK – CB (CAI) Zaragoza	86–89 (43–35)	
1984–85	FIBA Cup Winners' Cup (2nd tier)	Quarter finals (group stage)	29–01–1985	(Austria) PAOK – UBSC (Landis+Gyr) Vienna	93–96 (51–58)	
1985–86	FIBA Korać Cup (3rd tier)	1st round	02–10–1985	(Bulgaria) Levski-Spartak Sofia – PAOK	105–87 (48–42)	
1985–86	FIBA Korać Cup (3rd tier)	1st round	09–10–1985	(Bulgaria) PAOK – Levski-Spartak Sofia	104–83 (60–39)	
1985–86	FIBA Korać Cup (3rd tier)	2nd round	30–10–1985	(Belgium) Standard (Boule d'or) Andenne – PAOK	81–96 (38–47)	
1985–86	FIBA Korać Cup (3rd tier)	2nd round	06–11–1985	(Belgium) PAOK – Standard (Boule d'or) Andenne	92–76 (48–34)	
1985–86	FIBA Korać Cup (3rd tier)	Round of 16 (group stage)	04–12–1985	(Italy) PAOK – Auxilium (Berloni) Torino	100–92 (45–46)	
1985–86	FIBA Korać Cup (3rd tier)	Round of 16 (group stage)	11–12–1985	PAOK – Zadar	73–70 (42–32)	
1985–86	FIBA Korać Cup (3rd tier)	Round of 16 (group stage)	08–01–1986	(France) Olympique Antibes – PAOK	90–83 (45–50)	
1985–86	FIBA Korać Cup (3rd tier)	Round of 16 (group stage)	15–01–1986	(Italy) Auxilium (Berloni) Torino – PAOK	97–82 (48–41)	
1985–86	FIBA Korać Cup (3rd tier)	Round of 16 (group stage)	21–01–1986	Zadar – PAOK	98–79 (59–39)	
1985–86	FIBA Korać Cup (3rd tier)	Round of 16 (group stage)	29–01–1986	(France) PAOK – Olympique Antibes	67–88 (37–44)	
1986–87	FIBA Korać Cup (3rd tier)	1st round	01–10–1986	(Bulgaria) CSKA Sofia – PAOK	85–83 (43–37)	
1986–87	FIBA Korać Cup (3rd tier)	1st round	08–10–1986	(Bulgaria) PAOK – CSKA Sofia	89–77 (45–34)	
1986–87	FIBA Korać Cup (3rd tier)	2nd round	29–10–1986	PAOK – Partizan Belgrade	79–69 (40–32)	
1986–87	FIBA Korać Cup (3rd tier)	2nd round	06–11–1986	Partizan Belgrade – PAOK	90–75 (48–38)	
1987–88	FIBA Korać Cup (3rd tier)	1st round	Bye			
1987–88	FIBA Korać Cup (3rd tier)	2nd round	14–10–1987	(France) Olympique Antibes – PAOK	82–98 (44–51)	
1987–88	FIBA Korać Cup (3rd tier)	2nd round	21–10–1987	(France) PAOK – Olympique Antibes	111–107 (50–47)	
1987–88	FIBA Korać Cup (3rd tier)	Round of 16 (group stage)	02–12–1987	(Spain) PAOK – Estudiantes (Todagrés) Madrid	88–86 (48–41)	
1987–88	FIBA Korać Cup (3rd tier)	Round of 16 (group stage)	09–12–1987	PAOK – Red Star Belgrade	88–93 (40–49)	
1987–88	FIBA Korać Cup (3rd tier)	Round of 16 (group stage)	16–12–1987	(France) ASVEL – PAOK	109–99 (45–55)	
1987–88	FIBA Korać Cup (3rd tier)	Round of 16 (group stage)	06–01–1988	(Spain) Estudiantes (Todagrés) Madrid – PAOK	83–81 (45–37)	
1987–88	FIBA Korać Cup (3rd tier)	Round of 16 (group stage)	13–01–1988	Red Star Belgrade – PAOK	93–88 (83–83, 40–47)	
1987–88	FIBA Korać Cup (3rd tier)	Round of 16 (group stage)	20–01–1988	(France) PAOK – ASVEL	80–81 (48–37)	
1988–89	FIBA Korać Cup (3rd tier)	1st round	12–10–1988	(France) ASVEL – PAOK	83–93 (40–46)	
1988–89	FIBA Korać Cup (3rd tier)	1st round	20–10–1988	(France) PAOK – ASVEL	125–78 (62–42)	
1988–89	FIBA Korać Cup (3rd tier)	2nd round	01–11–1988	PAOK – Red Star Belgrade	95–85 (41–48)	
1988–89	FIBA Korać Cup (3rd tier)	2nd round	08–11–1988	Red Star Belgrade – PAOK	2–0 (86–76, 35–40) note 1	
1989–90	FIBA Cup Winners' Cup (2nd tier)	1st round	Bye			
1989–90	FIBA Cup Winners' Cup (2nd tier)	2nd round	24–10–1989	(Portugal) Ovarense – PAOK	83–101 (43–52)	
1989–90	FIBA Cup Winners' Cup (2nd tier)	2nd round	31–10–1989	(Portugal) PAOK – Ovarense	117–67 (52–38)	
1989–90	FIBA Cup Winners' Cup (2nd tier)	Quarter finals (group stage)	05–12–1989	(Spain) Real Madrid – PAOK	92–71 (33–46)	
1989–90	FIBA Cup Winners' Cup (2nd tier)	Quarter finals (group stage)	12–12–1989	(France) Mulhouse – PAOK	81–82 (55–40)	
1989–90	FIBA Cup Winners' Cup (2nd tier)	Quarter finals (group stage)	16–01–1990	PAOK – Partizan Belgrade	93–81 (46–34)	
1989–90	FIBA Cup Winners' Cup (2nd tier)	Quarter finals (group stage)	23–01–1990	(Spain) PAOK – Real Madrid	80–77 (37–34)	
1989–90	FIBA Cup Winners' Cup (2nd tier)	Quarter finals (group stage)	30–01–1990	(France) PAOK – Mulhouse	92–76 (56–32)	
1989–90	FIBA Cup Winners' Cup (2nd tier)	Quarter finals (group stage)	06–02–1990	Partizan Belgrade – PAOK	95–79 (41–39)	
1989–90	FIBA Cup Winners' Cup (2nd tier)	Semi final	20–02–1990	(Italy) Virtus (Knorr) Bologna – PAOK	77–57 (36–32)	
1989–90	FIBA Cup Winners' Cup (2nd tier)	Semi final	27–02–1990	(Italy) PAOK – Virtus (Knorr) Bologna	100–94 (56–50)	
1990–91	FIBA Cup Winners' Cup (2nd tier)	1st round	Bye			
1990–91	FIBA Cup Winners' Cup (2nd tier)	2nd round	23–10–1990	(England) Sunderland Saints – PAOK	89–96 (39–50)	
1990–91	FIBA Cup Winners' Cup (2nd tier)	2nd round	30–10–1990	(England) PAOK – Sunderland Saints	97–85 (55–43)	
1990–91	FIBA Cup Winners' Cup (2nd tier)	Quarter finals (group stage)	11–12–1990	(Spain) CB (CAI) Zaragoza – PAOK	70–64 (27–25)	
1990–91	FIBA Cup Winners' Cup (2nd tier)	Quarter finals (group stage)	18–12–1990	PAOK – Red Star Belgrade	91–80 (43–33)	
1990–91	FIBA Cup Winners' Cup (2nd tier)	Quarter finals (group stage)	08–01–1991	(Israel) PAOK – Hapoel Galil Elyon	107–77 (52–43)	
1990–91	FIBA Cup Winners' Cup (2nd tier)	Quarter finals (group stage)	15–01–1991	(Spain) PAOK – CB (CAI) Zaragoza	112–102 (45–46)	
1990–91	FIBA Cup Winners' Cup (2nd tier)	Quarter finals (group stage)	22–01–1991	Red Star Belgrade – PAOK	91–75 (49–40)	
1990–91	FIBA Cup Winners' Cup (2nd tier)	Quarter finals (group stage)	29–01–1991	(Israel) Hapoel Galil Elyon – PAOK	80–79 (39–37)	
1990–91	FIBA Cup Winners' Cup (2nd tier)	Semi final	12–02–1991	PAOK – Dynamo Moscow	95–82 (40–42)	
1990–91	FIBA Cup Winners' Cup (2nd tier)	Semi final	26–02–1991	Dynamo Moscow – PΑΟΚ	75–63 (35–29)	
1990–91	FIBA Cup Winners' Cup (2nd tier)	Final	26–03–1991	(Spain) PAOK – CB (CAI) Zaragoza	76–72 (31–36)	Cup winner
1991–92	FIBA European Cup (2nd tier)	1st round	Bye			
1991–92	FIBA European Cup (2nd tier)	2nd round	01–10–1991	(Cyprus) APOEL Nicosia – PAOK	53–111 (21–51)	
1991–92	FIBA European Cup (2nd tier)	2nd round	08–10–1991	(Cyprus) PAOK – APOEL Nicosia	106–54 (65–26)	
1991–92	FIBA European Cup (2nd tier)	3rd round	Bye			
1991–92	FIBA European Cup (2nd tier)	Quarter finals (group stage)	26–11–1991	(Israel) Maccabi Rishon LeZion – PAOK	92–97 (51–41)	
1991–92	FIBA European Cup (2nd tier)	Quarter finals (group stage)	03–12–1991	(Italy) PAOK – Scaligera (Glaxo) Verona	71–73 (34–36)	
1991–92	FIBA European Cup (2nd tier)	Quarter finals (group stage)	11–12–1991	(France) Limoges – PAOK	79–81 (32–42)	
1991–92	FIBA European Cup (2nd tier)	Quarter finals (group stage)	17–12–1991	(Belgium) PAOK – BC (Sunair) Oostende	81–70 (35–39)	
1991–92	FIBA European Cup (2nd tier)	Quarter finals (group stage)	07–01–1992	(Germany) PAOK – Alba Berlin	83–79 (38–43)	
1991–92	FIBA European Cup (2nd tier)	Quarter finals (group stage)	14–01–1992	(Israel) PAOK – Maccabi Rishon LeZion	95–80 (40–38)	
1991–92	FIBA European Cup (2nd tier)	Quarter finals (group stage)	21–01–1992	(Italy) Scaligera (Glaxo) Verona – PAOK	75–76 (36–36)	
1991–92	FIBA European Cup (2nd tier)	Quarter finals (group stage)	28–01–1992	(France) PAOK – Limoges	79–68 (35–33)	
1991–92	FIBA European Cup (2nd tier)	Quarter finals (group stage)	04–02–1992	(Belgium) BC (Sunair) Oostende – PAOK	81–87 (32–45)	
1991–92	FIBA European Cup (2nd tier)	Quarter finals (group stage)	11–02–1992	(Germany) Alba Berlin – PAOK	65–79 (32–32)	
1991–92	FIBA European Cup (2nd tier)	Semi final	20–02–1992	Olimpija (Smelt) Ljubljana – PAOK	81–68 (39–31)	
1991–92	FIBA European Cup (2nd tier)	Semi final	25–02–1992	PAOK – Olimpija (Smelt) Ljubljana	79–61 (40–26)	
1991–92	FIBA European Cup (2nd tier)	Semi final	27–02–1992	PAOK – Olimpija (Smelt) Ljubljana	104–86 (47–36)	
1991–92	FIBA European Cup (2nd tier)	Final	17–03–1992	(Spain) Real Madrid – PAOK	65–63 (43–28)	Cup finalist
1992–93	FIBA European League (1st tier)	1st round	10–09–1992	(Cyprus) Pezoporikos Larnaca – PAOK	61–104 (29–51)	
1992–93	FIBA European League (1st tier)	1st round	17–09–1992	(Cyprus) PAOK – Pezoporikos Larnaca	107–69 (60–40)	
1992–93	FIBA European League (1st tier)	2nd round	01–10–1992	Red Star Belgrade – PAOK	0–2 note 2	
1992–93	FIBA European League (1st tier)	2nd round	08–10–1992	PAOK – Red Star Belgrade	2–0	
1992–93	FIBA European League (1st tier)	Round of 16 (group stage)	29–10–1992	(Italy) Victoria Libertas (Scavolini) Pesaro – PAOK	80–70 (40–42)	
1992–93	FIBA European League (1st tier)	Round of 16 (group stage)	05–11–1992	(France) PAOK – Limoges	67–57 (33–30)	
1992–93	FIBA European League (1st tier)	Round of 16 (group stage)	03–12–1992	(Israel) Maccabi (Elite) Tel Aviv – PAOK	85–81 (41–36)	
1992–93	FIBA European League (1st tier)	Round of 16 (group stage)	10–12–1992	(Italy) Virtus (Knorr) Bologna – PAOK	64–75 (32–36)	
1992–93	FIBA European League (1st tier)	Round of 16 (group stage)	17–12–1992	(Spain) PAOK – Joventut (Marbella) Badalona	83–81 (49–40)	
1992–93	FIBA European League (1st tier)	Round of 16 (group stage)	06–01–1993	(Croatia) Cibona Zagreb – PAOK	71–82 (35–43)	
1992–93	FIBA European League (1st tier)	Round of 16 (group stage)	14–01–1993	(Italy) PAOK – Victoria Libertas (Scavolini) Pesaro	69–65 (57–57, 52–52, 28–31)	
1992–93	FIBA European League (1st tier)	Round of 16 (group stage)	20–01–1993	(France) Limoges – PAOK	60–58 (35–32)	
1992–93	FIBA European League (1st tier)	Round of 16 (group stage)	04–02–1993	(Israel) PAOK – Maccabi (Elite) Tel Aviv	78–63 (35–27)	
1992–93	FIBA European League (1st tier)	Round of 16 (group stage)	11–02–1993	(Italy) PAOK – Virtus (Knorr) Bologna	64–62 (32–33)	
1992–93	FIBA European League (1st tier)	Round of 16 (group stage)	17–02–1993	(Spain) Joventut (Marbella) Badalona – PAOK	84–71 (51–39)	
1992–93	FIBA European League (1st tier)	Round of 16 (group stage)	25–02–1993	(Croatia) PAOK – Cibona Zagreb	81–67 (38–26)	
1992–93	FIBA European League (1st tier)	Quarter final	11–03–1993	(France) Pau Orthez – PAOK	86–103 (40–44)	
1992–93	FIBA European League (1st tier)	Quarter final	16–03–1993	(France) PAOK – Pau Orthez	81–65 (32–31)	
1992–93	FIBA European League (1st tier)	Semi final	13–04–1993	(Italy) Pallacanestro (Benetton) Treviso – PAOK	79–77 (45–51)	
1992–93	FIBA European League (1st tier)	3rd place game	15–04–1993	(Spain) PAOK – Real Madrid	76–70 (46–38)	Third place
1993–94	FIBA Korać Cup (3rd tier)	1st round	Bye			
1993–94	FIBA Korać Cup (3rd tier)	2nd round	Bye			
1993–94	FIBA Korać Cup (3rd tier)	3rd round	27–10–1993	(Russia) Stroitel Samara – PAOK	77–81 (43–50)	
1993–94	FIBA Korać Cup (3rd tier)	3rd round	03–11–1993	(Russia) PAOK – Stroitel Samara	101–56 (50–30)	
1993–94	FIBA Korać Cup (3rd tier)	Round of 16 (group stage)	24–11–1993	(Spain) CB (Caja San Fernando) Sevilla – PAOK	82–87 (42–36)	
1993–94	FIBA Korać Cup (3rd tier)	Round of 16 (group stage)	30–11–1993	(Italy) Olimpia (Recoaro) Milano – PAOK	76–74 (37–45)	
1993–94	FIBA Korać Cup (3rd tier)	Round of 16 (group stage)	08–12–1993	(Croatia) PAOK – KK Zagreb	84–70 (35–31)	
1993–94	FIBA Korać Cup (3rd tier)	Round of 16 (group stage)	15–12–1993	(Spain) PAOK – CB (Caja San Fernando) Sevilla	92–89 (47–43)	
1993–94	FIBA Korać Cup (3rd tier)	Round of 16 (group stage)	05–01–1994	(Italy) PAOK – Olimpia (Recoaro) Milano	71–67 (36–35)	
1993–94	FIBA Korać Cup (3rd tier)	Round of 16 (group stage)	12–01–1994	(Croatia) KK Zagreb – PAOK	77–91 (40–44)	
1993–94	FIBA Korać Cup (3rd tier)	Quarter final	26–01–1994	(Italy) Victoria Libertas (Scavolini) Pesaro – PAOK	82–66 (35–32)	
1993–94	FIBA Korać Cup (3rd tier)	Quarter final	02–02–1994	(Italy) PAOK – Victoria Libertas (Scavolini) Pesaro	96–58 (45–35)	
1993–94	FIBA Korać Cup (3rd tier)	Semi final	16–02–1994	(Greece) Panionios (Chipita) Athens – PAOK	83–85 (48–34)	
1993–94	FIBA Korać Cup (3rd tier)	Semi final	23–02–1994	(Greece) PAOK – Panionios (Chipita) Athens	82–64 (31–34)	
1993–94	FIBA Korać Cup (3rd tier)	Final	09–03–1994	(Italy) PAOK – Pallacanestro (Stefanel) Trieste	75–66 (35–28)	Cup winner
1993–94	FIBA Korać Cup (3rd tier)	Final	16–03–1994	(Italy) Pallacanestro (Stefanel) Trieste – PAOK	91–100 (44–46)	Cup winner
1994–95	FIBA European League (1st tier)	1st round	Bye			
1994–95	FIBA European League (1st tier)	2nd round	29–09–1994	(Israel) Hapoel Tel Aviv – PAOK	82–70 (44–36)	
1994–95	FIBA European League (1st tier)	2nd round	06–10–1994	(Israel) PAOK – Hapoel Tel Aviv	82–66 (36–31)	
1994–95	FIBA European League (1st tier)	Round of 16 (group stage)	27–10–1994	(Israel) Maccabi (Elite) Tel Aviv – PAOK	75–84 (37–35)	
1994–95	FIBA European League (1st tier)	Round of 16 (group stage)	02–11–1994	(Russia) PAOK – CSKA Moscow	80–81 (39–37)	
1994–95	FIBA European League (1st tier)	Round of 16 (group stage)	23–11–1994	(Portugal) PAOK – Benfica Lisbon	74–68 (34–27)	
1994–95	FIBA European League (1st tier)	Round of 16 (group stage)	30–11–1994	Olimpija (Smelt) Ljubljana – PAOK	87–81 (43–44)	
1994–95	FIBA European League (1st tier)	Round of 16 (group stage)	08–12–1994	(Greece) Panathinaikos – PAOK	72–63 (32–38)	
1994–95	FIBA European League (1st tier)	Round of 16 (group stage)	14–12–1994	(Spain) PAOK – Real Madrid	57–73 (31–32)	
1994–95	FIBA European League (1st tier)	Round of 16 (group stage)	04–01–1995	(Italy) Victoria Libertas (Scavolini) Pesaro – PAOK	82–70 (41–27)	
1994–95	FIBA European League (1st tier)	Round of 16 (group stage)	12–01–1995	(Israel) PAOK – Maccabi (Elite) Tel Aviv	79–62 (42–40)	
1994–95	FIBA European League (1st tier)	Round of 16 (group stage)	18–01–1995	(Russia) CSKA Moscow – PAOK	85–73 (47–38)	
1994–95	FIBA European League (1st tier)	Round of 16 (group stage)	26–01–1995	(Portugal) Benfica Lisbon – PAOK	77–75 (38–33)	
1994–95	FIBA European League (1st tier)	Round of 16 (group stage)	01–02–1995	PAOK – Olimpija (Smelt) Ljubljana	85–66 (36–33)	
1994–95	FIBA European League (1st tier)	Round of 16 (group stage)	08–02–1995	(Greece) PAOK – Panathinaikos	80–70 (37–35)	
1994–95	FIBA European League (1st tier)	Round of 16 (group stage)	16–02–1995	(Spain) Real Madrid – PAOK	69–52 (29–22)	
1994–95	FIBA European League (1st tier)	Round of 16 (group stage)	22–02–1995	(Italy) PAOK – Victoria Libertas (Scavolini) Pesaro	84–79 (43–36)	
1995–96	FIBA European Cup (2nd tier)	1st round	09–09–1995	(Cyprus) PAEE Kyrenia – PAOK	40–109 (23–56)	
1995–96	FIBA European Cup (2nd tier)	1st round	12–09–1995	(Cyprus) PAOK – PAEE Kyrenia	116–47 (61–35)	
1995–96	FIBA European Cup (2nd tier)	2nd round	26–09–1995	KD Postojna – PAOK	71–79 (36–36)	
1995–96	FIBA European Cup (2nd tier)	2nd round	03–10–1995	PAOK – KD Postojna	110–66 (52–31)	
1995–96	FIBA European Cup (2nd tier)	3rd round	24–10–1995	(Ukraine) PAOK – Budivelnyk Kiev	76–68 (43–29)	
1995–96	FIBA European Cup (2nd tier)	3rd round	31–10–1995	(Ukraine) Budivelnyk Kiev – PAOK	75–74 (36–38)	
1995–96	FIBA European Cup (2nd tier)	Quarter finals (group stage)	21–11–1995	(Croatia) PAOK – Zrinjevac Zagreb	86–85 (72–72, 39–32)	
1995–96	FIBA European Cup (2nd tier)	Quarter finals (group stage)	28–11–1995	PAOK – Olimpija (Smelt) Ljubljana	77–67 (37–37)	
1995–96	FIBA European Cup (2nd tier)	Quarter finals (group stage)	05–12–1995	(Estonia) Kalev Tallinn – PAOK	71–75 (36–28)	
1995–96	FIBA European Cup (2nd tier)	Quarter finals (group stage)	12–12–1995	(Russia) Dynamo Moscow – PAOK	65–62 (32–28)	
1995–96	FIBA European Cup (2nd tier)	Quarter finals (group stage)	19–12–1995	(Poland) PAOK – KK (Nobiles) Włocławek	109–66 (49–35)	
1995–96	FIBA European Cup (2nd tier)	Quarter finals (group stage)	02–01–1996	(Croatia) Zrinjevac Zagreb – PAOK	76–73 (32–28)	
1995–96	FIBA European Cup (2nd tier)	Quarter finals (group stage)	09–01–1996	Olimpija (Smelt) Ljubljana – PAOK	66–86 (35–49)	
1995–96	FIBA European Cup (2nd tier)	Quarter finals (group stage)	16–01–1996	(Estonia) PAOK – Kalev Tallinn	77–63 (33–38)	
1995–96	FIBA European Cup (2nd tier)	Quarter finals (group stage)	23–01–1996	(Russia) PAOK – Dynamo Moscow	64–59 (32–35)	
1995–96	FIBA European Cup (2nd tier)	Quarter finals (group stage)	30–01–1996	(Poland) KK (Nobiles) Włocławek – PAOK	57–112 (30–58)	
1995–96	FIBA European Cup (2nd tier)	Semi final	06–02–1996	(Lithuania) Žalgiris Kaunas – PAOK	76–83 (41–33)	
1995–96	FIBA European Cup (2nd tier)	Semi final	13–02–1996	(Lithuania) PAOK – Žalgiris Kaunas	104–59 (60–32)	
1995–96	FIBA European Cup (2nd tier)	Final	12–03–1996	(Spain) Saski Baskonia (Taugrés) – PAOK	88–81 (44–50)	Cup finalist
1996–97	FIBA Korać Cup (3rd tier)	Prelim. round	Bye			
1996–97	FIBA Korać Cup (3rd tier)	1st round (group stage)	02–10–1996	(Turkey) PAOK – Galatasaray Istanbul	93–61 (53–27)	
1996–97	FIBA Korać Cup (3rd tier)	1st round (group stage)	09–10–1996	(Portugal) Ovarense – PAOK	85–99 (48–68)	
1996–97	FIBA Korać Cup (3rd tier)	1st round (group stage)	15–10–1996	(Sweden) PAOK – BBK (Astra) Södertälje	120–63 (56–29)	
1996–97	FIBA Korać Cup (3rd tier)	1st round (group stage)	06–11–1996	(Turkey) Galatasaray Istanbul – PAOK	64–90 (32–47)	
1996–97	FIBA Korać Cup (3rd tier)	1st round (group stage)	12–11–1996	(Portugal) PAOK – Ovarense	97–72 (52–33)	
1996–97	FIBA Korać Cup (3rd tier)	1st round (group stage)	20–11–1996	(Sweden) BBK (Astra) Södertälje – PAOK	79–88 (42–44)	
1996–97	FIBA Korać Cup (3rd tier)	Round of 32	04–12–1996	Red Star Belgrade – PAOK	99–102 (43–44)	
1996–97	FIBA Korać Cup (3rd tier)	Round of 32	11–12–1996	PAOK – Red Star Belgrade	100–87 (54–39)	
1996–97	FIBA Korać Cup (3rd tier)	Round of 16	15–01–1997	(Italy) PAOK – Pallacanestro (Benetton) Treviso	85–78 (38–45)	
1996–97	FIBA Korać Cup (3rd tier)	Round of 16	22–01–1997	(Italy) Pallacanestro (Benetton) Treviso – PAOK	84–60 (44–35)	
1997–98	FIBA EuroLeague (1st tier)	1st round (group stage)	18–09–1997	(Portugal) Porto – PAOK	71–88 (34–47)	
1997–98	FIBA EuroLeague (1st tier)	1st round (group stage)	25–09–1997	(Croatia) KK Split – PAOK	74–76 (32–35)	
1997–98	FIBA EuroLeague (1st tier)	1st round (group stage)	01–10–1997	(Spain) PAOK – Estudiantes Madrid	72–76 (38–34)	
1997–98	FIBA EuroLeague (1st tier)	1st round (group stage)	09–10–1997	(Italy) PAOK – Pallacanestro (Benetton) Treviso	65–62 (33–34)	
1997–98	FIBA EuroLeague (1st tier)	1st round (group stage)	22–10–1997	(Turkey) PTT (Türk Telekom) Ankara – PAOK	73–66 (38–40)	
1997–98	FIBA EuroLeague (1st tier)	1st round (group stage)	06–11–1997	(Portugal) PAOK – Porto	84–50 (53–14)	
1997–98	FIBA EuroLeague (1st tier)	1st round (group stage)	12–11–1997	(Croatia) PAOK – KK Split	89–60 (43–25)	
1997–98	FIBA EuroLeague (1st tier)	1st round (group stage)	19–11–1997	(Spain) Estudiantes Madrid – PAOK	78–60 (36–29)	
1997–98	FIBA EuroLeague (1st tier)	1st round (group stage)	11–12–1997	(Italy) Pallacanestro (Benetton) Treviso – PAOK	65–57 (35–29)	
1997–98	FIBA EuroLeague (1st tier)	1st round (group stage)	17–12–1997	(Turkey) PAOK – PTT (Türk Telekom) Ankara	72–63 (39–24)	
1997–98	FIBA EuroLeague (1st tier)	2nd round (group stage)	08–01–1998	(Russia) CSKA Moscow – PAOK	78–48 (46–23)	
1997–98	FIBA EuroLeague (1st tier)	2nd round (group stage)	14–01–1998	(France) PAOK – Limoges	85–76 (31–31)	
1997–98	FIBA EuroLeague (1st tier)	2nd round (group stage)	22–01–1998	(Spain) Real Madrid – PAOK	63–58 (32–22)	
1997–98	FIBA EuroLeague (1st tier)	2nd round (group stage)	05–02–1998	(Russia) PAOK – CSKA Moscow	61–58 (35–35)	
1997–98	FIBA EuroLeague (1st tier)	2nd round (group stage)	11–02–1998	(France) Limoges – PAOK	77–75 (64–64, 27–29)	
1997–98	FIBA EuroLeague (1st tier)	2nd round (group stage)	18–02–1998	(Spain) PAOK – Real Madrid	63–59 (32–26)	
1997–98	FIBA EuroLeague (1st tier)	Round of 16	03–03–1998	(Germany) Alba Berlin – PAOK	77–75 (69–69, 35–36)	
1997–98	FIBA EuroLeague (1st tier)	Round of 16	05–03–1998	(Germany) PAOK – Alba Berlin	81–60 (40–27)	
1997–98	FIBA EuroLeague (1st tier)	Round of 16	12–03–1998	(Germany) Alba Berlin – PAOK	104–71 (53–30)	
1998–99	FIBA EuroLeague (1st tier)	1st round (group stage)	23–09–1998	(Spain) PAOK – Real Madrid	87–75 (41–34)	
1998–99	FIBA EuroLeague (1st tier)	1st round (group stage)	30–09–1998	(France) ASVEL – PAOK	80–66 (40–30)	
1998–99	FIBA EuroLeague (1st tier)	1st round (group stage)	07–10–1998	PAOK – Olimpija (Union) Ljubljana	76–68 (41–30)	
1998–99	FIBA EuroLeague (1st tier)	1st round (group stage)	14–10–1998	(Italy) Fortitudo (Teamsystem) Bologna – PAOK	76–61 (44–35)	
1998–99	FIBA EuroLeague (1st tier)	1st round (group stage)	22–10–1998	(Russia) PAOK – Samara	85–66 (41–35)	
1998–99	FIBA EuroLeague (1st tier)	1st round (group stage)	05–11–1998	(Spain) Real Madrid – PAOK	77–69 (33–30)	
1998–99	FIBA EuroLeague (1st tier)	1st round (group stage)	11–11–1998	(France) PAOK – ASVEL	65–69 (33–43)	
1998–99	FIBA EuroLeague (1st tier)	1st round (group stage)	19–11–1998	Olimpija (Union) Ljubljana – PAOK	84–68 (49–28)	
1998–99	FIBA EuroLeague (1st tier)	1st round (group stage)	09–12–1998	(Italy) PAOK – Fortitudo (Teamsystem) Bologna	68–59 (30–32)	
1998–99	FIBA EuroLeague (1st tier)	1st round (group stage)	17–12–1998	(Russia) Samara – PAOK	84–77 (40–34)	
1998–99	FIBA EuroLeague (1st tier)	2nd round (group stage)	07–01–1999	(Italy) PAOK – Virtus (Kinder) Bologna	71–57 (32–27)	
1998–99	FIBA EuroLeague (1st tier)	2nd round (group stage)	13–01–1999	(Greece) Olympiacos Piraeus – PAOK	57–71 (21–30)	
1998–99	FIBA EuroLeague (1st tier)	2nd round (group stage)	20–01–1999	(Russia) PAOK – CSKA Moscow	69–71 (47–36)	
1998–99	FIBA EuroLeague (1st tier)	2nd round (group stage)	04–02–1999	(Italy) Virtus (Kinder) Bologna – PAOK	78–56 (41–36)	
1998–99	FIBA EuroLeague (1st tier)	2nd round (group stage)	10–02–1999	(Greece) PAOK – Olympiacos Piraeus	72–66 (35–38)	
1998–99	FIBA EuroLeague (1st tier)	2nd round (group stage)	17–02–1999	(Russia) CSKA Moscow – PAOK	77–67 (41–25)	
1999–00	FIBA EuroLeague (1st tier)	1st round (group stage)	23–09–1999	Red Star Belgrade – PAOK	65–64 (29–34)	
1999–00	FIBA EuroLeague (1st tier)	1st round (group stage)	29–09–1999	(France) PAOK – Cholet	83–76 (35–32)	
1999–00	FIBA EuroLeague (1st tier)	1st round (group stage)	06–10–1999	(Russia) PAOK – CSKA Moscow	83–63 (38–34)	
1999–00	FIBA EuroLeague (1st tier)	1st round (group stage)	20–10–1999	(Italy) Pallacanestro (Benetton) Treviso – PAOK	69–66 (36–34)	
1999–00	FIBA EuroLeague (1st tier)	1st round (group stage)	28–10–1999	(Spain) Barcelona – PAOK	76–55 (32–32)	
1999–00	FIBA EuroLeague (1st tier)	1st round (group stage)	04–11–1999	PAOK – Red Star Belgrade	82–53 (53–14)	
1999–00	FIBA EuroLeague (1st tier)	1st round (group stage)	10–11–1999	(France) Cholet – PAOK	48–66 (22–32)	
1999–00	FIBA EuroLeague (1st tier)	1st round (group stage)	17–11–1999	(Russia) CSKA Moscow – PAOK	71–82 (31–44)	
1999–00	FIBA EuroLeague (1st tier)	1st round (group stage)	08–12–1999	(Italy) PAOK – Pallacanestro (Benetton) Treviso	66–72 (38–37)	
1999–00	FIBA EuroLeague (1st tier)	1st round (group stage)	15–12–1999	(Spain) PAOK – Barcelona	83–87 (39–48)	
1999–00	FIBA EuroLeague (1st tier)	2nd round (group stage)	06–01–2000	(Spain) PAOK – Real Madrid	72–71 (31–42)	
1999–00	FIBA EuroLeague (1st tier)	2nd round (group stage)	13–01–2000	Olimpija (Union) Ljubljana – PAOK	69–63 (33–25)	
1999–00	FIBA EuroLeague (1st tier)	2nd round (group stage)	19–01–2000	(Greece) PAOK – Panathinaikos	69–77 (29–39)	
1999–00	FIBA EuroLeague (1st tier)	2nd round (group stage)	03–02–2000	(Spain) Real Madrid – PAOK	72–61 (44–33)	
1999–00	FIBA EuroLeague (1st tier)	2nd round (group stage)	09–02–2000	PAOK – Olimpija (Union) Ljubljana	70–74 (37–28)	
1999–00	FIBA EuroLeague (1st tier)	2nd round (group stage)	17–02–2000	(Greece) Panathinaikos – PAOK	71–75 (38–47)	
1999–00	FIBA EuroLeague (1st tier)	Round of 16	29–02–2000	(Israel) Maccabi (Elite) Tel Aviv – PAOK	77–62 (45–31)	
1999–00	FIBA EuroLeague (1st tier)	Round of 16	02–03–2000	(Israel) PAOK – Maccabi (Elite) Tel Aviv	67–55 (31–30)	
1999–00	FIBA EuroLeague (1st tier)	Round of 16	09–03–2000	(Israel) Maccabi (Elite) Tel Aviv – PAOK	78–62 (48–25)	
2000–01	ULEB Euroleague (1st tier)	1st round (group stage)	18–10–2000	(Italy) PAOK – Scaligera (Müller) Verona	97–94 (78–78, 39–39)	
2000–01	ULEB Euroleague (1st tier)	1st round (group stage)	25–10–2000	(Spain) Barcelona – PAOK	58–67 (33–36)	
2000–01	ULEB Euroleague (1st tier)	1st round (group stage)	01–11–2000	(Germany) PAOK – Skyliners (Opel) Frankfurt	100–70 (46–33)	
2000–01	ULEB Euroleague (1st tier)	1st round (group stage)	08–11–2000	Budućnost Podgorica – PAOK	83–71 (46–36)	
2000–01	ULEB Euroleague (1st tier)	1st round (group stage)	15–11–2000	(England) PAOK – London Towers	70–58 (30–26)	
2000–01	ULEB Euroleague (1st tier)	1st round (group stage)	06–12–2000	(Italy) Scaligera (Müller) Verona – PAOK	102–88 (53–38)	
2000–01	ULEB Euroleague (1st tier)	1st round (group stage)	13–12–2000	(Spain) PAOK – Barcelona	91–102 (44–50)	
2000–01	ULEB Euroleague (1st tier)	1st round (group stage)	20–12–2000	(Germany) Skyliners (Opel) Frankfurt – PAOK	73–80 (20–40)	
2000–01	ULEB Euroleague (1st tier)	1st round (group stage)	10–01–2001	PAOK – Budućnost Podgorica	89–72 (44–32)	
2000–01	ULEB Euroleague (1st tier)	1st round (group stage)	18–01–2001	(England) London Towers – PAOK	61–93 (34–42)	
2000–01	ULEB Euroleague (1st tier)	Round of 16	01–02–2001	PAOK – Olimpija (Union) Ljubljana	75–64 (40–39)	
2000–01	ULEB Euroleague (1st tier)	Round of 16	08–02–2001	Olimpija (Union) Ljubljana – PAOK	85–77 (43–43)	
2000–01	ULEB Euroleague (1st tier)	Round of 16	14–02–2001	PAOK – Olimpija (Union) Ljubljana	69–73 (37–36)	
2001–02	FIBA Korać Cup (3rd tier)	Prelim. round	Bye			
2001–02	FIBA Korać Cup (3rd tier)	1st round	16–10–2001	(Cyprus) Apollon Limassol – PAOK	65–69 (28–34)	
2001–02	FIBA Korać Cup (3rd tier)	1st round	23–10–2001	(Cyprus) PAOK – Apollon Limassol	95–71 (56–33)	
2001–02	FIBA Korać Cup (3rd tier)	Round of 32 (group stage)	14–11–2001	(Israel) Maccabi Ironi Ramat Gan – PAOK	81–71 (40–32)	
2001–02	FIBA Korać Cup (3rd tier)	Round of 32 (group stage)	05–12–2001	(Russia) PAOK – Lokomotiv Mineralnye Vody	63–82 (27–45)	
2001–02	FIBA Korać Cup (3rd tier)	Round of 32 (group stage)	12–12–2001	(Cyprus) AEL Limassol – PAOK	90–92 (52–50)	
2001–02	FIBA Korać Cup (3rd tier)	Round of 32 (group stage)	19–12–2001	(Israel) PAOK – Maccabi Ironi Ramat Gan	72–44 (45–25)	
2001–02	FIBA Korać Cup (3rd tier)	Round of 32 (group stage)	09–01–2002	(Russia) Lokomotiv Mineralnye Vody – PAOK	85–64 (41–27)	
2001–02	FIBA Korać Cup (3rd tier)	Round of 32 (group stage)	16–01–2002	(Cyprus) PAOK – AEL Limassol	102–62 (45–31)	
2002–03	FIBA Champions Cup (3rd tier)	1st round (group stage)	02–10–2002	PAOK – Slovan (Geoplin) Ljubljana	94–79 (59–44)	
2002–03	FIBA Champions Cup (3rd tier)	1st round (group stage)	08–10–2002	HKK (Feal) Široki Brijeg – PAOK	84–80 (45–40)	
2002–03	FIBA Champions Cup (3rd tier)	1st round (group stage)	16–10–2002	(Bulgaria) Academic (Lukoil) Sofia – PAOK	103–78 (60–43)	
2002–03	FIBA Champions Cup (3rd tier)	1st round (group stage)	23–10–2002	(Cyprus) PAOK – APOEL (Elma) Nicosia	78–60 (40–38)	
2002–03	FIBA Champions Cup (3rd tier)	1st round (group stage)	29–10–2002	(Croatia) KK Zagreb – PAOK	80–95 (39–41)	
2002–03	FIBA Champions Cup (3rd tier)	1st round (group stage)	05–11–2002	Slovan (Geoplin) Ljubljana – PAOK	81–88 (40–42)	
2002–03	FIBA Champions Cup (3rd tier)	1st round (group stage)	13–11–2002	PAOK – HKK (Feal) Široki Brijeg	89–73 (49–42)	
2002–03	FIBA Champions Cup (3rd tier)	1st round (group stage)	04–12–2002	(Bulgaria) PAOK – Academic (Lukoil) Sofia	74–72 (41–34)	
2002–03	FIBA Champions Cup (3rd tier)	1st round (group stage)	10–12–2002	(Cyprus) APOEL (Elma) Nicosia – PAOK	58–104 (27–57)	
2002–03	FIBA Champions Cup (3rd tier)	1st round (group stage)	18–12–2002	(Croatia) PAOK – KK Zagreb	78–88 (38–43)	
2002–03	FIBA Champions Cup (3rd tier)	2nd round (group stage)	04–02–2003	KK (Hemofarm) Vršac – PAOK	84–68 (37–32)	
2002–03	FIBA Champions Cup (3rd tier)	2nd round (group stage)	11–02–2003	(Lithuania) PAOK – Lietuvos Rytas Vilnius	71–73 (34–35)	
2002–03	FIBA Champions Cup (3rd tier)	2nd round (group stage)	25–02–2003	Skonto Riga – PAOK	107–76 (54–44)	
2002–03	FIBA Champions Cup (3rd tier)	2nd round (group stage)	04–03–2003	PAOK – KK (Hemofarm) Vršac	86–78 (41–41)	
2002–03	FIBA Champions Cup (3rd tier)	2nd round (group stage)	18–03–2003	(Lithuania) Lietuvos Rytas Vilnius – PAOK	109–79 (60–43)	
2002–03	FIBA Champions Cup (3rd tier)	2nd round (group stage)	26–03–2003	PAOK – Skonto Riga	90–84 (47–50)	
2003–04	FIBA Europe League (3rd tier)	1st round (group stage)	14–10–2003	HKK (Hercegtisak) Široki Brijeg – PAOK	78–96 (44–41)	
2003–04	FIBA Europe League (3rd tier)	1st round (group stage)	22–10–2003	(Ukraine) PAOK – Azovmash Mariupol	85–65 (37–32)	
2003–04	FIBA Europe League (3rd tier)	1st round (group stage)	29–10–2003	(Belgium) BC (Telindus) Oostende – PAOK	79–101 (43–53)	
2003–04	FIBA Europe League (3rd tier)	1st round (group stage)	05–11–2003	(Russia) PAOK – UNICS Kazan	78–91 (43–51)	
2003–04	FIBA Europe League (3rd tier)	1st round (group stage)	12–11–2003	(Lithuania) PAOK – Alita Alytus	93–81 (48–37)	
2003–04	FIBA Europe League (3rd tier)	1st round (group stage)	18–11–2003	(France) Le Havre – PAOK	92–100 (83–83, 43–44)	
2003–04	FIBA Europe League (3rd tier)	1st round (group stage)	26–11–2003	(Turkey) PTT (Türk Telekom) Ankara – PAOK	20–0 note 3	
2003–04	FIBA Europe League (3rd tier)	1st round (group stage)	03–12–2003	PAOK – HKK (Hercegtisak) Široki Brijeg	DNP	
2003–04	FIBA Europe League (3rd tier)	1st round (group stage)	10–12–2003	(Ukraine) Azovmash Mariupol – PAOK	DNP	
2003–04	FIBA Europe League (3rd tier)	1st round (group stage)	17–12–2003	(Belgium) PAOK – BC (Telindus) Oostende	DNP	
2003–04	FIBA Europe League (3rd tier)	1st round (group stage)	14–01–2004	(Russia) UNICS Kazan – PAOK	DNP	
2003–04	FIBA Europe League (3rd tier)	1st round (group stage)	21–01–2004	(Lithuania) Alita Alytus – PAOK	DNP	
2003–04	FIBA Europe League (3rd tier)	1st round (group stage)	28–01–2004	(France) PAOK – Le Havre	DNP	
2003–04	FIBA Europe League (3rd tier)	1st round (group stage)	04–02–2004	(Turkey) PAOK – PTT (Türk Telekom) Ankara	DNP	
2004–05	ULEB Cup (2nd tier)	1st round (group stage)	09–11–2004	(Hungary) Debreceni Vadkakasok – PAOK	69–77 (28–44)	
2004–05	ULEB Cup (2nd tier)	1st round (group stage)	16–11–2004	(France) Gravelines – PAOK	70–83 (36–48)	
2004–05	ULEB Cup (2nd tier)	1st round (group stage)	23–11–2004	(Belgium) PAOK – Spirou Charleroi	80–73 (36–38)	
2004–05	ULEB Cup (2nd tier)	1st round (group stage)	30–11–2004	(Germany) PAOK – Alba Berlin	88–94 (76–76, 44–37)	
2004–05	ULEB Cup (2nd tier)	1st round (group stage)	07–12–2004	Budućnost Podgorica – PAOK	104–98 (37–45)	
2004–05	ULEB Cup (2nd tier)	1st round (group stage)	14–12–2004	(Hungary) PAOK – Debreceni Vadkakasok	95–76 (53–35)	
2004–05	ULEB Cup (2nd tier)	1st round (group stage)	21–12–2004	(France) PAOK – Gravelines	104–82 (50–43)	
2004–05	ULEB Cup (2nd tier)	1st round (group stage)	04–01–2005	(Belgium) Spirou Charleroi – PAOK	74–81 (44–36)	
2004–05	ULEB Cup (2nd tier)	1st round (group stage)	12–01–2005	(Germany) Alba Berlin – PAOK	61–68 (28–30)	
2004–05	ULEB Cup (2nd tier)	1st round (group stage)	18–01–2005	PAOK – Budućnost Podgorica	92–75 (43–43)	
2004–05	ULEB Cup (2nd tier)	Round of 16	01–02–2005	(France) Cholet – PAOK	75–78 (34–32)	
2004–05	ULEB Cup (2nd tier)	Round of 16	09–02–2005	(France) PAOK – Cholet	74–71 (36–31)	
2004–05	ULEB Cup (2nd tier)	Quarter final	01–03–2005	(Lithuania) PAOK – Lietuvos Rytas Vilnius	74–71 (37–32)	
2004–05	ULEB Cup (2nd tier)	Quarter final	08–03–2005	(Lithuania) Lietuvos Rytas Vilnius – PAOK	76–65 (28–40)	
2005–06	FIBA EuroCup (3rd tier)	1st round (group stage)	25–10–2005	(Turkey) Fenerbahçe Istanbul – PAOK	101–91 (43–38)	
2005–06	FIBA EuroCup (3rd tier)	1st round (group stage)	02–11–2005	(Cyprus) PAOK – AEL (Proteas EKA) Limassol	74–75 (68–68, 33–33)	
2005–06	FIBA EuroCup (3rd tier)	1st round (group stage)	09–11–2005	(Estonia) PAOK – Kalev Tallinn	74–69 (38–26)	
2005–06	FIBA EuroCup (3rd tier)	1st round (group stage)	16–11–2005	(Turkey) PAOK – Fenerbahçe Istanbul	84–88 (46–39)	
2005–06	FIBA EuroCup (3rd tier)	1st round (group stage)	23–11–2005	(Cyprus) AEL (Proteas EKA) Limassol – PAOK	84–67 (37–37)	
2005–06	FIBA EuroCup (3rd tier)	1st round (group stage)	29–11–2005	(Estonia) Kalev Tallinn – PAOK	127–76 (62–35)	
2006–07	ULEB Cup (2nd tier)	1st round (group stage)	31–10–2006	(Serbia) PAOK – Red Star Belgrade	68–78 (35–43)	
2006–07	ULEB Cup (2nd tier)	1st round (group stage)	07–11–2006	(Spain) Real Madrid – PAOK	69–45 (26–20)	
2006–07	ULEB Cup (2nd tier)	1st round (group stage)	14–11–2006	(Belgium) PAOK – Belfius (Dexia) Mons-Hainaut	83–69 (43–30)	
2006–07	ULEB Cup (2nd tier)	1st round (group stage)	21–11–2006	(Netherlands) EiffelTowers Den Bosch – PAOK	71–78 (38–33)	
2006–07	ULEB Cup (2nd tier)	1st round (group stage)	28–11–2006	(Russia) PAOK – UNICS Kazan	84–81 (45–39)	
2006–07	ULEB Cup (2nd tier)	1st round (group stage)	05–12–2006	(Serbia) Red Star Belgrade – PAOK	81–85 (44–45)	
2006–07	ULEB Cup (2nd tier)	1st round (group stage)	12–12–2006	(Spain) PAOK – Real Madrid	53–76 (26–39)	
2006–07	ULEB Cup (2nd tier)	1st round (group stage)	19–12–2006	(Belgium) Belfius (Dexia) Mons-Hainaut – PAOK	80–82 (46–45)	
2006–07	ULEB Cup (2nd tier)	1st round (group stage)	09–01–2007	(Netherlands) PAOK – EiffelTowers Den Bosch	90–88 (42–45)	
2006–07	ULEB Cup (2nd tier)	1st round (group stage)	16–01–2007	(Russia) UNICS Kazan – PAOK	85–57 (37–35)	
2006–07	ULEB Cup (2nd tier)	Round of 16	30–01–2007	(Italy) PAOK – Mens Sana (Montepaschi) Siena	62–79 (27–35)	
2006–07	ULEB Cup (2nd tier)	Round of 16	13–02–2007	(Italy) Mens Sana (Montepaschi) Siena – PAOK	80–77 (32–30)	
2007–08	FIBA EuroCup (3rd tier)	1st round	Bye			
2007–08	FIBA EuroCup (3rd tier)	2nd round	20–11–2007	(Romania) PAOK – U-Mobitelco Cluj-Napoca	79–74 (44–35)	
2007–08	FIBA EuroCup (3rd tier)	2nd round	27–11–2007	(Romania) U-Mobitelco Cluj-Napoca – PAOK	65–71 (39–37)	
2007–08	FIBA EuroCup (3rd tier)	Round of 16 (group stage)	11–12–2007	(Estonia) PAOK – Tartu Rock	58–69 (22–31)	
2007–08	FIBA EuroCup (3rd tier)	Round of 16 (group stage)	17–12–2007	(Finland) Lappeenrannan – PAOK	83–74 (52–31)	
2007–08	FIBA EuroCup (3rd tier)	Round of 16 (group stage)	08–01–2008	(Russia) PAOK – Samara	65–73 (63–63, 29–29)	
2007–08	FIBA EuroCup (3rd tier)	Round of 16 (group stage)	15–01–2008	(Estonia) Tartu Rock – PAOK	90–80 (56–33)	
2007–08	FIBA EuroCup (3rd tier)	Round of 16 (group stage)	22–01–2008	(Finland) PAOK – Lappeenrannan	80–76 (46–49)	
2007–08	FIBA EuroCup (3rd tier)	Round of 16 (group stage)	29–01–2008	(Russia) Samara – PAOK	80–61 (41–30)	
2010–11	ULEB EuroCup (2nd tier)	Prelim. round	Bye			
2010–11	ULEB EuroCup (2nd tier)	1st round (group stage)	16–11–2010	(Spain) Estudiantes (Asefa) Madrid – PAOK	88–77 (37–33)	
2010–11	ULEB EuroCup (2nd tier)	1st round (group stage)	23–11–2010	(Italy) PAOK – Pallacanestro (Benetton) Treviso	62–67 (26–35)	
2010–11	ULEB EuroCup (2nd tier)	1st round (group stage)	30–11–2010	(France) PAOK – Chorale Roanne	92–74 (50–38)	
2010–11	ULEB EuroCup (2nd tier)	1st round (group stage)	07–12–2010	(France) Chorale Roanne – PAOK	60–72 (32–43)	
2010–11	ULEB EuroCup (2nd tier)	1st round (group stage)	14–12–2010	(Spain) PAOK – Estudiantes (Asefa) Madrid	77–72 (40–29)	
2010–11	ULEB EuroCup (2nd tier)	1st round (group stage)	21–12–2010	(Italy) Pallacanestro (Benetton) Treviso – PAOK	77–69 (38–37)	
2011–12	ULEB Euroleague (1st T.)	1st Qual. Round	30–09–2011	(Turkey) Galatasaray Istanbul – PAOK	77–64 (34–32)	
2011–12	ULEB EuroCup (2nd tier)	Prelim. round	Bye			
2011–12	ULEB EuroCup (2nd tier)	1st round (group stage)	15–11–2011	VEF Riga – PAOK	80–74 (45–44)	
2011–12	ULEB EuroCup (2nd tier)	1st round (group stage)	22–11–2011	(France) PAOK – Cholet	74–62 (33–30)	
2011–12	ULEB EuroCup (2nd tier)	1st round (group stage)	29–11–2011	(Russia) PAOK – Khimki Moscow	62–71 (30–42)	
2011–12	ULEB EuroCup (2nd tier)	1st round (group stage)	06–12–2011	(Russia) Khimki Moscow – PAOK	89–65 (40–32)	
2011–12	ULEB EuroCup (2nd tier)	1st round (group stage)	13–12–2011	PAOK – VEF Riga	76–81 (39–46)	
2011–12	ULEB EuroCup (2nd tier)	1st round (group stage)	20–12–2011	(France) Cholet – PAOK	69–66 (37–34)	
2013–14	ULEB EuroCup (2nd tier)	1st round (group stage)	15–10–2013	PAOK – Budućnost (Voli) Podgorica	85–84 (34–38)	
2013–14	ULEB EuroCup (2nd tier)	1st round (group stage)	23–10–2013	(Hungary) Alba (Bericap) Fehérvár – PAOK	88–89 (42–35)	
2013–14	ULEB EuroCup (2nd tier)	1st round (group stage)	30–10–2013	(Turkey) PAOK – TED (Aykon) Ankara	75–77 (48–32)	
2013–14	ULEB EuroCup (2nd tier)	1st round (group stage)	06–11–2013	(Ukraine) PAOK – Khimik Yuzhne	77–69 (39–34)	
2013–14	ULEB EuroCup (2nd tier)	1st round (group stage)	13–11–2013	(Russia) Nizhny Novgorod – PAOK	87–53 (37–30)	
2013–14	ULEB EuroCup (2nd tier)	1st round (group stage)	19–11–2013	Budućnost (Voli) Podgorica – PAOK	69–75 (38–40)	
2013–14	ULEB EuroCup (2nd tier)	1st round (group stage)	27–11–2013	(Hungary) PAOK – Alba (Bericap) Fehérvár	68–64 (40–29)	
2013–14	ULEB EuroCup (2nd tier)	1st round (group stage)	04–12–2013	(Turkey) TED (Aykon) Ankara – PAOK	84–65 (48–18)	
2013–14	ULEB EuroCup (2nd tier)	1st round (group stage)	10–12–2013	(Ukraine) Khimik Yuzhne – PAOK	70–58 (23–33)	
2013–14	ULEB EuroCup (2nd tier)	1st round (group stage)	18–12–2013	(Russia) PAOK – Nizhny Novgorod	52–60 (24–29)	
2014–15	ULEB EuroCup (2nd tier)	1st round (group stage)	15–10–2014	(Turkey) Karşıyaka (Pınar) İzmir – PAOK	81–87 (73–73, 66–66, 40–36)	
2014–15	ULEB EuroCup (2nd tier)	1st round (group stage)	22–10–2014	(Poland) PAOK – (Stelmet) Zielona Góra	85–66 (45–33)	
2014–15	ULEB EuroCup (2nd tier)	1st round (group stage)	28–10–2014	(Russia) Lokomotiv Kuban – PAOK	87–46 (45–26)	
2014–15	ULEB EuroCup (2nd tier)	1st round (group stage)	05–11–2014	Ventspils – PAOK	63–66 (30–30)	
2014–15	ULEB EuroCup (2nd tier)	1st round (group stage)	12–11–2014	PAOK – Budućnost (Voli) Podgorica	80–60 (42–25)	
2014–15	ULEB EuroCup (2nd tier)	1st round (group stage)	19–11–2014	(Turkey) PAOK – Karşıyaka (Pınar) İzmir	74–79 (45–41)	
2014–15	ULEB EuroCup (2nd tier)	1st round (group stage)	25–11–2014	(Poland) (Stelmet) Zielona Góra – PAOK	84–77 (36–34)	
2014–15	ULEB EuroCup (2nd tier)	1st round (group stage)	03–12–2014	(Russia) PAOK – Lokomotiv Kuban	54–68 (29–35)	
2014–15	ULEB EuroCup (2nd tier)	1st round (group stage)	10–12–2014	PAOK – Ventspils	76–62 (34–31)	
2014–15	ULEB EuroCup (2nd tier)	1st round (group stage)	17–12–2014	Budućnost (Voli) Podgorica – PAOK	76–81 (73–73, 30–29)	
2014–15	ULEB EuroCup (2nd tier)	2nd round (group stage)	07–01–2015	(France) Limoges – PAOK	71–59 (31–31)	
2014–15	ULEB EuroCup (2nd tier)	2nd round (group stage)	14–01–2015	(Italy) PAOK – Pallacanestro (Foxtown) Cantù	78–77 (38–34)	
2014–15	ULEB EuroCup (2nd tier)	2nd round (group stage)	21–01–2015	(Russia) PAOK – Khimki Moscow	78–82 (40–40)	
2014–15	ULEB EuroCup (2nd tier)	2nd round (group stage)	28–01–2015	(Russia) Khimki Moscow – PAOK	102–68 (51–36)	
2014–15	ULEB EuroCup (2nd tier)	2nd round (group stage)	04–02–2015	(France) PAOK – Limoges	68–79 (34–32)	
2014–15	ULEB EuroCup (2nd tier)	2nd round (group stage)	11–02–2015	(Italy) Pallacanestro (Foxtown) Cantù – PAOK	78–70 (37–42)	
2015–16	ULEB EuroCup (2nd tier)	1st round (group stage)	14–10–2015	(Hungary) PAOK – Szolnoki Olaj	72–69 (37–32)	
2015–16	ULEB EuroCup (2nd tier)	1st round (group stage)	21–10–2015	(Russia) Zenit Saint Petersburg – PAOK	76–66 (32–29)	
2015–16	ULEB EuroCup (2nd tier)	1st round (group stage)	28–10–2015	(Turkey) PAOK – Beşiktaş (Sompo Japan) Istanbul	80–100 (28–55)	
2015–16	ULEB EuroCup (2nd tier)	1st round (group stage)	04–11–2015	(Russia) Avtodor Saratov – PAOK	90–68 (41–38)	
2015–16	ULEB EuroCup (2nd tier)	1st round (group stage)	11–11–2015	(Lithuania) PAOK – Lietuvos Rytas Vilnius	81–76 (40–33)	
2015–16	ULEB EuroCup (2nd tier)	1st round (group stage)	18–11–2015	(Hungary) Szolnoki Olaj – PAOK	78–69 (24–36)	
2015–16	ULEB EuroCup (2nd tier)	1st round (group stage)	25–11–2015	(Russia) PAOK – Zenit Saint Petersburg	70–89 (24–36)	
2015–16	ULEB EuroCup (2nd tier)	1st round (group stage)	02–12–2015	(Turkey) Beşiktaş (Sompo Japan) Istanbul – PAOK	73–75 (62–62, 34–20)	
2015–16	ULEB EuroCup (2nd tier)	1st round (group stage)	09–12–2015	(Russia) PAOK – Avtodor Saratov	104–99 (49–44)	
2015–16	ULEB EuroCup (2nd tier)	1st round (group stage)	16–12–2015	(Lithuania) Lietuvos Rytas Vilnius – PAOK	81–88 (50–45)	
2015–16	ULEB EuroCup (2nd tier)	2nd round (group stage)	06–01–2016	(Spain) Valencia – PAOK	78–62 (34–29)	
2015–16	ULEB EuroCup (2nd tier)	2nd round (group stage)	12–01–2016	(France) PAOK – Limoges	88–75 (47–36)	
2015–16	ULEB EuroCup (2nd tier)	2nd round (group stage)	19–01–2016	(Germany) PAOK – EWE Baskets Oldenburg	68–81 (28–43)	
2015–16	ULEB EuroCup (2nd tier)	2nd round (group stage)	26–01–2016	(Germany) EWE Baskets Oldenburg – PAOK	83–71 (48–39)	
2015–16	ULEB EuroCup (2nd tier)	2nd round (group stage)	03–02–2016	(Spain) PAOK – Valencia	75–72 (39–33)	
2015–16	ULEB EuroCup (2nd tier)	2nd round (group stage)	10–02–2016	(France) Limoges – PAOK	79–61 (39–25)	
2016–17	FIBA Champions League (3rd tier)	1st Qual. Round	Bye			
2016–17	FIBA Champions League (3rd tier)	2nd Qual. Round	Bye			
2016–17	FIBA Champions League (3rd tier)	Regular season (Group C)	19–10–2016	(Poland) Rosa Radom – PAOK	93–85 (79–79, 71–71, 65–65, 33–30)	
2016–17	FIBA Champions League (3rd tier)	Regular season (Group C)	25–10–2016	(Turkey) PAOK – Uşak (Muratbey) Sportif	59–52 (23–25)	
2016–17	FIBA Champions League (3rd tier)	Regular season (Group C)	01–11–2016	(Italy) Pallacanestro (Openjobmetis) Varese – PAOK	70–75 (35–38)	
2016–17	FIBA Champions League (3rd tier)	Regular season (Group C)	08–11–2016	(France) PAOK – ASVEL	61–67 (31–35)	
2016–17	FIBA Champions League (3rd tier)	Regular season (Group C)	16–11–2016	(Lithuania) Neptūnas – PAOK	68–63 (32–40)	
2016–17	FIBA Champions League (3rd tier)	Regular season (Group C)	22–11–2016	(Germany) EWE Baskets Oldenburg – PAOK	67–62 (27–33)	
2016–17	FIBA Champions League (3rd tier)	Regular season (Group C)	30–11–2016	PAOK – Ventspils	85–81 (71–71, 39–36)	
2016–17	FIBA Champions League (3rd tier)	Regular season (Group C)	06–12–2016	(Poland) PAOK – Rosa Radom	85–66 (47–31)	
2016–17	FIBA Champions League (3rd tier)	Regular season (Group C)	14–12–2016	(Turkey) Uşak (Muratbey) Sportif – PAOK	78–77 (39–36)	
2016–17	FIBA Champions League (3rd tier)	Regular season (Group C)	21–12–2016	(Italy) PAOK – Pallacanestro (Openjobmetis) Varese	78–69 (40–34)	
2016–17	FIBA Champions League (3rd tier)	Regular season (Group C)	04–01–2017	(France) ASVEL – PAOK	70–56 (39–33)	
2016–17	FIBA Champions League (3rd tier)	Regular season (Group C)	10–01–2017	(Lithuania) PAOK – Neptūnas	82–73 (44–35)	
2016–17	FIBA Champions League (3rd tier)	Regular season (Group C)	18–01–2017	(Germany) PAOK – EWE Baskets Oldenburg	79–82 (30–37)	
2016–17	FIBA Champions League (3rd tier)	Regular season (Group C)	24–01–2017	Ventspils – PAOK	54–84 (31–45)	
2016–17	FIBA Champions League (3rd tier)	Play-offs	08–02–2017	(Serbia) PAOK – Partizan (NIS) Belgrade	74–76 (32–40)	
2016–17	FIBA Champions League (3rd tier)	Play-offs	22–02–2017	(Serbia) Partizan (NIS) Belgrade – PAOK	78–82 (32–47)	
2016–17	FIBA Champions League (3rd tier)	Round of 16	28–02–2017	(Spain) PAOK – CB (Iberostar Tenerife) Canarias	66–63 (34–30)	
2016–17	FIBA Champions League (3rd tier)	Round of 16	08–03–2017	(Spain) CB (Iberostar Tenerife) Canarias – PAOK	80–54 (37–16)	
2017–18	FIBA Champions League (3rd tier)	1st Qual. Round	Bye			
2017–18	FIBA Champions League (3rd tier)	2nd Qual. Round	Bye			
2017–18	FIBA Champions League (3rd tier)	3rd Qual. Round	Bye			
2017–18	FIBA Champions League (3rd tier)	Regular season (Group B)	10–10–2017	(Germany) MHP Riesen Ludwigsburg – PAOK	103–70 (48-40)	
2017–18	FIBA Champions League (3rd tier)	Regular season (Group B)	18–10–2017	(Turkey) PAOK – Gaziantep	82–85 (38–42)	
2017–18	FIBA Champions League (3rd tier)	Regular season (Group B)	24–10–2017	(Italy) SikeliArchivi Capo d'Orlando – PAOK	58–63 (19–32)	
2017–18	FIBA Champions League (3rd tier)	Regular season (Group B)	31–10–2017	(France) Élan Chalon – PAOK	75–61 (36–41)	
2017–18	FIBA Champions League (3rd tier)	Regular season (Group B)	8–11–2017	(Spain) PAOK – CB (Iberostar Tenerife) Canarias	74–79 (36–42)	
2017–18	FIBA Champions League (3rd tier)	Regular season (Group B)	15–11–2017	(Lithuania) Neptūnas – PAOK	82–69 (51–32)	
2017–18	FIBA Champions League (3rd tier)	Regular season (Group B)	5–12–2017	PAOK – Ventspils	83–76 (35–41)	
2017–18	FIBA Champions League (3rd tier)	Regular season (Group B)	12–12–2017	(Germany) PAOK – MHP Riesen Ludwigsburg	63–83 (48–47)	
2017–18	FIBA Champions League (3rd tier)	Regular season (Group B)	20–12–2017	(Turkey) Gaziantep – PAOK	65–77 (62-62, 30–34)	
2017–18	FIBA Champions League (3rd tier)	Regular season (Group B)	09–01–2018	(Italy) PAOK – SikeliArchivi Capo d'Orlando	79–61 (41-35)	
2017–18	FIBA Champions League (3rd tier)	Regular season (Group B)	16–01–2018	(France) PAOK – Élan Chalon	90–81 (48-42)	
2017–18	FIBA Champions League (3rd tier)	Regular season (Group B)	24–01–2018	(Spain) CB (Iberostar Tenerife) Canarias – PAOK	93–79 (46–39)	
2017–18	FIBA Champions League (3rd tier)	Regular season (Group B)	31–01–2018	(Lithuania) PAOK – Neptūnas	91–70 (58-32)	
2017–18	FIBA Champions League (3rd tier)	Regular season (Group B)	06–02–2018	Ventspils – PAOK	59–80 (36-46)	
2017–18	FIBA Champions League (3rd tier)	Round of 16	06–03–2018	(Turkey) PAOK – Pinar Karşıyaka	74–68 (39-37)	
2017–18	FIBA Champions League (3rd tier)	Round of 16	14–03–2018	(Turkey) Pinar Karşıyaka- PAOK	79–67 (43–33)	
2018–19	FIBA Champions League (3rd tier)	1st Qual. Round	Bye			
2018–19	FIBA Champions League (3rd tier)	2nd Qual. Round	Bye			
2018–19	FIBA Champions League (3rd tier)	3rd Qual. Round	Bye			
2018–19	FIBA Champions League (3rd tier)	Regular season (Group B)	09–10–2018	(Italy) Umana Reyer Venezia – PAOK	69–59 (43-35)	
2018–19	FIBA Champions League (3rd tier)	Regular season (Group B)	16–10–2018	(Germany) PAOK – Telekom Baskets Bonn	95–100 (53–57)	
2018–19	FIBA Champions League (3rd tier)	Regular season (Group B)	23–10–2018	(Israel) Hapoel Unet Holon – PAOK	72–68 (34-42)	
2018–19	FIBA Champions League (3rd tier)	Regular season (Group B)	30–10–2018	(France) PAOK – Nanterre 92	83–82 (41–25)	
2018–19	FIBA Champions League (3rd tier)	Regular season (Group B)	06–11–2018	(Czech Republic) Opava – PAOK	69–94 (45–47)	
2018–19	FIBA Champions League (3rd tier)	Regular season (Group B)	14–11–2018	(Switzerland) PAOK – Fribourg Olympic	92–61 (51–24)	
2018–19	FIBA Champions League (3rd tier)	Regular season (Group B)	21–11–2018	(Spain) Iberostar Tenerife – PAOK	65–66 (33–32)	
2018–19	FIBA Champions League (3rd tier)	Regular season (Group B)	12–12–2018	(Italy) PAOK – Umana Reyer Venezia	77–76 (46–37)	
2018–19	FIBA Champions League (3rd tier)	Regular season (Group B)	18–12–2018	(Germany) Telekom Baskets Bonn – PAOK	94–77 (46-31)	
2018–19	FIBA Champions League (3rd tier)	Regular season (Group B)	08–01–2019	(Israel) PAOK – Hapoel Unet Holon	92–77 (47–31)	
2018–19	FIBA Champions League (3rd tier)	Regular season (Group B)	16–01–2019	(France) Nanterre 92 – PAOK	79–70 (43-41)	
2018–19	FIBA Champions League (3rd tier)	Regular season (Group B)	23–01–2019	(Czech Republic) PAOK – Opava	93–43 (49–22)	
2018–19	FIBA Champions League (3rd tier)	Regular season (Group B)	30–01–2019	(Switzerland) Fribourg Olympic – PAOK	64–84 (34–41)	
2018–19	FIBA Champions League (3rd tier)	Regular season (Group B)	05–02–2019	(Spain) PAOK – Iberostar Tenerife	77–85 (32-36)	
2018–19	FIBA Champions League (3rd tier)	Round of 16	05–03–2019	(Greece) PAOK – AEK	75–84 (36-45)	
2018–19	FIBA Champions League (3rd tier)	Round of 16	13–03–2019	(Greece) AEK- PAOK	62–63 (32–27)	
2019–20	FIBA Champions League (3rd tier)	1st Qual. Round	Bye			
2019–20	FIBA Champions League (3rd tier)	2nd Qual. Round	Bye			
2019–20	FIBA Champions League (3rd tier)	Regular season (Group D)	15–10–2019	(Turkey) PAOK – Beşiktaş Sompo Sigorta	60–69 (33-32)	
2019–20	FIBA Champions League (3rd tier)	Regular season (Group D)	22–10–2019	(Hungary) Falco – PAOK	76–66 (32-36)	
2019–20	FIBA Champions League (3rd tier)	Regular season (Group D)	29–10–2019	(Lithuania) PAOK – Neptūnas	72–94 (39-45)	
2019–20	FIBA Champions League (3rd tier)	Regular season (Group D)	05–11–2019	(France) JDA Dijon – PAOK	81–76 (41-33)	
2019–20	FIBA Champions League (3rd tier)	Regular season (Group D)	12–11–2019	(Italy) PAOK – Happy Casa Brindisi	95–91 (45–45)	
2019–20	FIBA Champions League (3rd tier)	Regular season (Group D)	20–11–2019	(Spain) PAOK – Casademont Zaragoza	93–78 (45–44)	
2019–20	FIBA Champions League (3rd tier)	Regular season (Group D)	04–12–2019	(Germany) Telekom Baskets Bonn – PAOK	83–85 (50–45)	
2019–20	FIBA Champions League (3rd tier)	Regular season (Group D)	10–12–2019	(Turkey) Beşiktaş Sompo Sigorta – PAOK	98–83 (51-41)	
2019–20	FIBA Champions League (3rd tier)	Regular season (Group D)	17–12–2019	(Hungary) PAOK – Falco	80–89 (37-51)	
2019–20	FIBA Champions League (3rd tier)	Regular season (Group D)	07–01–2020	(Lithuania) Neptūnas – PAOK	80–86 (42–47)	
2019–20	FIBA Champions League (3rd tier)	Regular season (Group D)	15–01–2020	(France) PAOK – JDA Dijon	77–84 (41-44)	
2019–20	FIBA Champions League (3rd tier)	Regular season (Group D)	22–01–2020	(Italy) Happy Casa Brindisi – PAOK	93–91 (45-53)	
2019–20	FIBA Champions League (3rd tier)	Regular season (Group D)	29–01–2020	(Spain) Casademont Zaragoza – PAOK	86–76 (45-42)	
2019–20	FIBA Champions League (3rd tier)	Regular season (Group D)	04–02–2020	(Germany) PAOK – Telekom Baskets Bonn	103–84 (47–48)	
2021–22	FIBA Champions League (3rd tier)	1st Qual. Round	Bye			
2021–22	FIBA Champions League (3rd tier)	2nd Qual. Round	Bye			
2021–22	FIBA Champions League (3rd tier)	3rd Qual. Round	Bye			
2021–22	FIBA Champions League (3rd tier)	Regular season (Group E)	05–10–2021	(Bosnia and Herzegovina) KK Igokea - PAOK	68–64 (26-32)	
2021–22	FIBA Champions League (3rd tier)	Regular season (Group E)	12–10–2021	(Czech Republic) PAOK - ERA Nymburk	83–84 (35-40)	
2021–22	FIBA Champions League (3rd tier)	Regular season (Group E)	25–10–2021	(Turkey) PAOK – Galatasaray	81–74 (33–36)	
2021–22	FIBA Champions League (3rd tier)	Regular season (Group E)	09–11–2021	(Czech Republic) ERA Nymburk - PAOK	71–75 (40–37)	
2021–22	FIBA Champions League (3rd tier)	Regular season (Group E)	08–12–2021	(Turkey) Galatasaray	87–75 (48-40)	
2021–22	FIBA Champions League (3rd tier)	Regular season (Group E)	22–12–2021	(Bosnia and Herzegovina) PAOK - KK Igokea	64–75 (37-38)	
2021–22	FIBA Champions League (3rd tier)	Play-ins	05–01–2022	(France) Strasbourg – PAOK	105–78 (57-34)	
2021–22	FIBA Champions League (3rd tier)	Play-ins	12–01–2022	(France) PAOK - Strasbourg	79–80 (34–37)	
2022–23	FIBA Champions League (3rd tier)	1st Qual. Round	Bye			
2022–23	FIBA Champions League (3rd tier)	2nd Qual. Round	Bye			
2022–23	FIBA Champions League (3rd tier)	3rd Qual. Round	Bye			
2022–23	FIBA Champions League (3rd tier)	Regular season (Group G)	05–10–2022	(France) PAOK - JDA Dijon	66–70 (28-37)	
2022–23	FIBA Champions League (3rd tier)	Regular season (Group G)	19–10–2022	(Italy) PAOK - Dinamo Sassari	88–68 (35-43)	
2022–23	FIBA Champions League (3rd tier)	Regular season (Group G)	2–11–2022	(Spain) PAOK – Unicaja Málaga	77–63 (36–32)	
2022–23	FIBA Champions League (3rd tier)	Regular season (Group G)	29–11–2022	(Italy) Dinamo Sassari - PAOK	82–78 (40–30)	
2022–23	FIBA Champions League (3rd tier)	Regular season (Group G)	13–12–2022	(Spain) PAOK - Unicaja Málaga	85–88 (36-44)	
2022–23	FIBA Champions League (3rd tier)	Regular season (Group G)	20–12–2022	(France) JDA Dijon - PAOK	69–74 (40-28)	
2022–23	FIBA Champions League (3rd tier)	Play-ins	03–01–2023	(Lithuania) Rytas – PAOK	85–62 (46-32)	
2022–23	FIBA Champions League (3rd tier)	Play-ins	11–01–2022	(Lithuania) PAOK - Rytas	81–78 (46–34)	
2022–23	FIBA Champions League (3rd tier)	Play-ins	17–01–2023	(Lithuania) Rytas – PAOK	82–63 (41-37)	
2023–24	FIBA Champions League (3rd tier)	Qualifying round	Bye			
2023–24	FIBA Champions League (3rd tier)	Regular season (Group G)	18–10–2023	(Turkey) Galatasaray - PAOK	77–88 (42-52)	TBD
2023–24	FIBA Champions League (3rd tier)	Regular season (Group G)	01–11–2023	(Portugal) Benfica - PAOK		TBD
2023–24	FIBA Champions League (3rd tier)	Regular season (Group G)	15–11–2023	(Israel) PAOK – Hapoel Jerusalem		TBD
2023–24	FIBA Champions League (3rd tier)	Regular season (Group G)	29–11–2023	(Portugal) PAOK - Benfica		TBD
2023–24	FIBA Champions League (3rd tier)	Regular season (Group G)	13–12–2023	(Israel) Hapoel Jerusalem - PAOK		TBD
2023–24	FIBA Champions League (3rd tier)	Regular season (Group G)	20–12–2023	(Turkey) PAOK - Galatasaray		TBD

^{1}: The game interrupted against PAOK at the beginning of the extra time. PAOK's coach Johnny Neumann push the Italian referee Grossi, when he impute breach at jump all.
^{2}: Red Star was drawn for the competition but was not allowed to compete due to United Nations embargo on Federal Republic of Yugoslavia. PAOK went through with a walkover.
^{3}: PAOK didn't show up to the match, so Türk Telekom was awarded a 20–0 walkover. Later, PAOK withdrawn from the competition.

== Statistics ==
=== Achievements ===
Tier	Competition	Cup winner	Cup finalist	SF	QF
1	EuroLeague	–	–	1	–
2	Saporta Cup / EuroCup	1	2	1	2
3	Korać Cup	1	–	–	–
	Total	2	2	2	2

=== Overall record ===
Tier	Competition	App	Pld	W	L
1st	FIBA Champions Cup / FIBA European League / FIBA EuroLeague / ULEB Euroleague	8	106	55	51
2nd	FIBA Cup Winners' Cup / FIBA European Cup / ULEB Cup / ULEB EuroCup	13	150	88	62
3rd	FIBA: Korać Cup / Champions Cup / Europe League / EuroCup / Champions League	17	145	81	64
Total		38	401	224	177

- PAOK has two walkover wins out of 224 and one walkover defeat out of 177.

=== Biggest wins and defeats ===
Largest margin of victory					Largest margin of defeat				
+69	1982–83 Cup Winners' Cup	12–10–1982	(Cyprus) AEL Limassol – PAOK	51–120 (27–56)	–51	2005–06 EuroCup	29–11–2005	(Estonia) Kalev Tallinn – PAOK^{1}	127–76 (62–35)
+69	1995–96 European Cup	09–09–1995	(Cyprus) PAEE Kyrenia – PAOK	40–109 (23–56)	–43	2017–18 Champions League	10–10–2017	(Germany) Riesen Ludwigsburg – PAOK	103–70 (48–40)
+69	1995–96 European Cup	12–09–1995	(Cyprus) PAOK – PAEE Kyrenia	116–47 (61–35)	–41	2014–15 EuroCup	28–10–2014	(Russia) Lokomotiv Kuban – PAOK	87–46 (45–26)
+58	1991–92 European Cup	01–10–1991	(Cyprus) APOEL Nicosia – PAOK	53–111 (21–51)	–39	1975–76 Korać Cup	18–11–1975	(France) Moderne Le Mans – PAOK	112–73(53–33)
+57	1982–83 Cup Winners' Cup	12–10–1982	(Cyprus) PAOK – AEL Limassol	111–54 (56–30)	–34	2013–14 EuroCup	13–11–2013	(Russia) Nizhny Novgorod – PAOK	87–53 (37–30)
+57	1996–97 Korać Cup	15–10–1996	(Sweden) PAOK – Astra Södertälje	120–63 (56–29)	–34	2014–15 EuroCup	28–01–2015	(Russia) Khimki Moscow – PAOK	102–68 (51–36)
+55	1995–96 European Cup	30–01–1996	(Poland) Nobiles Włocławek – PAOK	57–112 (30–58)	–33	1997–98 Euroleague	12–03–1998	(Germany) Alba Berlin – PAOK	104–71 (53–30)
+52	1991–92 European Cup	08–10–1991	(Cyprus) PAOK – APOEL Nicosia	106–54 (65–26)	–31	2002–03 Champions Cup	25–02–2003	Skonto Riga – PAOK	107–76 (54–44)
+50	1989–90 Cup Winners' Cup	31–10–1989	(Portugal) PAOK – Ovarense	117–67 (52–38)	–30	1997–98 Euroleague	08–01–1998	(Russia) CSKA Moscow – PAOK	78–48 (46–23)
+50	2018–19 Champions League	23–01–2019	(Czech Republic) PAOK – Opava	93–43 (49–22)	–30	2002–03 Champions Cup	18–03–2003	(Lithuania) Lietuvos Rytas – PAOK	109–79 (60–43)

^{1}: PAOK showed up to the match with only five players, three of them from the youth team.

=== Matches in overtime ===
Three overtimes
2016–17 FIBA Champions League	19–10–2016	(Poland) Rosa Radom – PAOK	93–85 (79–79, 71–71, 65–65)
Two overtimes
1992–93 FIBA European League	14–01–1993	(Italy) PAOK – Victoria Libertas (Scavolini) Pesaro	69–65 (57–57, 52–52)
2014–15 ULEB EuroCup	15–10–2014	(Turkey) Karşıyaka (Pınar) İzmir – PAOK	81–87 (73–73, 66–66)
One overtime
1983–84 FIBA Korać Cup	25–01–1984	(Italy) PAOK – Pallacanestro (Star) Varese	81–80 (73–73)
1987–88 FIBA Korać Cup	13–01–1988	Red Star Belgrade – PAOK	93–88 (83–83)
1988–89 FIBA Korać Cup	08–11–1988	Red Star Belgrade – PAOK	2–0 (86–76) note
1995–96 FIBA European Cup	21–11–1995	(Croatia) PAOK – Zrinjevac Zagreb	86–85 (72–72)
1997–98 FIBA EuroLeague	11–02–1998	(France) Limoges – PAOK	77–75 (64–64)
1997–98 FIBA EuroLeague	03–03–1998	(Germany) Alba Berlin – PAOK	77–75 (69–69)
2000–01 ULEB Euroleague	18–10–2000	(Italy) PAOK – Scaligera (Müller) Verona	97–94 (78–78)
2003–04 FIBA Europe League	18–11–2003	(France) Le Havre – PAOK	92–100 (83–83)
2004–05 ULEB Cup	30–11–2004	(Germany) PAOK – Alba Berlin	88–94 (76–76)
2005–06 FIBA EuroCup	02–11–2005	(Cyprus) PAOK – AEL (Proteas EKA) Limassol	74–75 (68–68)
2007–08 FIBA EuroCup	08–01–2008	(Russia) PAOK – Samara	65–73 (63–63)
2014–15 ULEB EuroCup	17–12–2014	Budućnost (Voli) Podgorica – PAOK	76–81 (73–73)
2015–16 ULEB EuroCup	02–12–2015	(Turkey) Beşiktaş (Sompo Japan) Istanbul – PAOK	73–75 (62–62)
2016–17 FIBA Champions League	30–11–2016	PAOK – Ventspils	85–81 (71–71)
2017–18 FIBA Champions League	20–12–2017	(Turkey) Gaziantep - PAOK	65–77 (62–62)

- Note: The game interrupted against PAOK at the beginning of the extra time. PAOK's American coach Johnny Neumann push the Italian referee Grossi, when he impute breach at jump all.

=== Opponents by country ===
Italy	Pallacanestro Varese	Spain	Zaragoza	Belgium	Aarschot	Slovenia	Olimpija Ljubljana
Italy	Auxilium Torino	Spain	Estudiantes Madrid	Belgium	Standard Liège	Slovenia	Postojna
Italy	Virtus Bologna	Spain	Real Madrid	Belgium	Oostende	Slovenia	Slovan Ljubljana
Italy	Scaligera Verona	Spain	Joventut Badalona	Belgium	Spirou Charleroi	Greece	Panionios
Italy	Victoria Libertas Pesaro	Spain	Sevilla	Belgium	Belfius Mons-Hainaut	Greece	Panathinaikos
Italy	Pallacanestro Treviso	Spain	Saski Baskonia	Cyprus	AEL Limassol	Greece	Olympiacos
Italy	Olimpia Milano	Spain	Barcelona	Cyprus	APOEL	Ukraine	Budivelnyk Kiev
Italy	Pallacanestro Trieste	Spain	Valencia	Cyprus	Pezoporikos Larnaca	Ukraine	Azovmash Mariupol
Italy	Fortitudo Bologna	Spain	CB Canarias	Cyprus	PAEE Kyrenia	Ukraine	Khimik Yuzhne
Italy	Mens Sana Siena	Turkey	Galatasaray	Cyprus	Apollon Limassol	Poland	KK Włocławek
Italy	Pallacanestro Cantù	Turkey	Türk Telekom Ankara	Hungary	Csepel Budapest	Poland	Zielona Góra
Italy	Orlandina	Turkey	Fenerbahçe	Hungary	Debreceni Vadkakasok	Poland	Rosa Radom
France	Le Mans Sarthe	Turkey	TED Ankara	Hungary	Alba Fehérvár	Latvia	Skonto Riga
France	Pau Orthez	Turkey	Karşıyaka İzmir	Hungary	Szolnoki Olaj	Latvia	VEF Riga
France	Olympique Antibes	Turkey	Beşiktaş	Lithuania	Žalgiris Kaunas	Latvia	Ventspils
France	ASVEL	Turkey	Uşak Sportif	Lithuania	Lietuvos Rytas Vilnius	Romania	Steaua Bucharest
France	Mulhouse	Turkey	Gaziantep	Lithuania	Alita Alytus	Romania	U-Mobitelco Cluj-Napoca
France	Limoges	Israel	Hapoel Ramat Gan	Lithuania	Neptūnas	Bosnia & Her.	Bosna Sarajevo
France	Cholet	Israel	Hapoel Galil Elyon	Germany	Alba Berlin	Bosnia & Her.	Široki Brijeg
France	Le Havre	Israel	Maccabi Rishon LeZion	Germany	Skyliners Frankfurt	Austria	Sparkasse Wels
France	Gravelines	Israel	Maccabi Tel Aviv	Germany	Oldenburg	Austria	UBSC Vienna
France	Chorale Roanne	Israel	Hapoel Tel Aviv	Germany	Ludwigsburg	England	Sunderland Saints
France	Chalon	Israel	Ironi Ramat Gan	Bulgaria	Levski Sofia	England	London Towers
Russia	Dynamo Moscow	Croatia	Zadar	Bulgaria	CSKA Sofia	Estonia	Kalev Tallinn
Russia	Samara	Croatia	Cibona Zagreb	Bulgaria	Academic Sofia	Estonia	Tartu
Russia	CSKA Moscow	Croatia	KK Zagreb	Serbia	Partizan Belgrade	Sweden	Södertälje
Russia	Lokomotiv Kuban	Croatia	Zrinjevac Zagreb	Serbia	Red Star Belgrade	Montenegro	Budućnost
Russia	UNICS Kazan	Croatia	KK Split	Serbia	KK Vršac	Netherlands	Den Bosch
Russia	Khimki Moscow			Portugal	Ovarense	Finland	Lappeenrannan
Russia	Nizhny Novgorod			Portugal	Benfica		
Russia	Zenit Saint Petersburg			Portugal	Porto		
Russia	Avtodor Saratov						

== See also ==
- Greek basketball clubs in European competitions
