= Giannis Politis =

Greek basketball player and coach (1952–2020)

Personal information
- Born: 15 March 1952 Thessaloniki, Greece
- Died: 13 June 2020 (aged 68)
- Listed height: 1.98 m (6 ft 6 in)

Career history

Playing
- –1970: Aetos Thessaloniki
- 1970–1984: PAOK
- 1987–1989: OFI

Coaching
- 1985–1987: PAOK (youth/assistant)
- 1989–1990: OFI

Career highlights
- Greek Basketball Cup champion (1984)

Ioannis "Giannis" Politis (Greek: Ιωάννης "Γιάννης" Πολίτης; 15 March 1952 – 13 June 2020) was a Greek basketball player and coach, best known for his fourteen-year playing career with PAOK from 1970 to 1984.

Politis made 289 Greek league appearances for PAOK and scored 3,225 points, placing him among the club's leading all-time scorers. He was the captain of the PAOK team that won the 1984 Greek Cup, the club's first cup title, defeating Aris 74–70 in the final.

He also represented Greece at youth, university and senior international level, including the Greek team that won the bronze medal at the 1971 Mediterranean Games.

== Early life ==
Politis was born on 15 March 1952 in Thessaloniki. He studied physical education and later worked as a physical education teacher, specializing in basketball.

He began playing basketball with Aetos Thessaloniki in the 1960s and reached the Greek top division with the club. As a teenager, he was already involved with the Greek national youth teams. At the 1970 European junior competition in Athens, he was part of the Greek team that reached the final.

== Playing career ==
=== Aetos Thessaloniki ===
Politis developed as a player with Aetos Thessaloniki and played with the club in the Greek First Division. By 1970, he had attracted interest from several of the leading Greek clubs before joining PAOK.

=== PAOK ===
Politis joined PAOK in 1970 and remained with the club for fourteen consecutive seasons. His arrival coincided with a transitional period for PAOK, during which the club sought to rebuild its basketball section following the decline that had followed its 1959 Greek championship.

During his PAOK career, Politis played 289 league games and scored 3,225 points. His fourteen seasons represented one of the longest continuous playing tenures in the club's history, while his scoring total placed him fifth on PAOK's all-time Greek league scoring list in later statistical records.

PAOK went through several difficult seasons during the 1970s before returning to contention for domestic honours at the beginning of the following decade. Politis became one of the senior figures of the team as younger players including Panagiotis Fasoulas and Nikos Stavropoulos emerged alongside established players such as Manthos Katsoulis and Vangelis Alexandris.

In the 1981–82 season, PAOK reached the Greek Basketball Cup final for the first time, losing 65–63 to Panathinaikos at the Alexandreio Melathron. The club also challenged for the Greek championship during the early 1980s.

=== 1984 Greek Cup ===
By 1984, Politis was PAOK's team captain. On 18 April 1984, PAOK faced local rivals Aris in the Greek Cup final at the Alexandreio Melathron. The match became known as the "final of the shaved heads" after PAOK's players shaved their heads before the game at the initiative of head coach Faidon Matthaiou.

PAOK defeated Aris 74–70, with Politis scoring eight points in the final. As captain, he was the first PAOK player to lift the trophy. It was PAOK's first Greek Cup and the club's first major basketball trophy since winning the national championship in 1959.

The 1984 cup victory became one of the defining moments of Politis' playing career and marked the beginning of a period in which PAOK developed into one of the leading Greek and European basketball clubs.

=== OFI ===
Several years after the end of his long PAOK tenure, Politis moved to Crete and joined OFI. A contemporary report in 1987 described his transfer to OFI at the age of 35 and listed him at 1.98 m, noting his previous senior international experience.

Politis combined playing and coaching duties with OFI during the late 1980s. He contributed to the club's promotion to the Greek national divisions and subsequently took charge of its men's team in the Greek Third Division.

== International career ==
Politis represented Greece at youth, university and senior international level between the late 1960s and the 1970s.

He was part of the Greek youth team that finished second at the 1970 European junior competition in Athens and also won silver at the Balkan junior championship later that year.

In 1971, Politis represented the senior Greek national team at the 1971 Mediterranean Games in İzmir, where Greece won the bronze medal. His international career also included Balkan competitions and Greece's university national team.

== Coaching career ==
Politis moved into coaching while maintaining his involvement in basketball as a physical education teacher.

From 1985 to 1987, he worked with PAOK's youth team and also served on the senior team's coaching staff. He later combined playing and coaching duties at OFI before becoming head coach of the club in the Greek Third Division.

Over the following decades, Politis coached a number of clubs in regional and national competitions, including Galaxias Adendrou, Achilleas Triandrias, Megas Alexandros Giannitsa, Keravnos Oraiokastrou, PAOD Thessaloniki, Aetos Thessaloniki and Ionikos Ionias. His longest association was with Galaxias Adendrou, where he worked during two separate periods, including a spell that continued until 2011.

He also worked extensively in youth basketball and player development, holding responsibility for academy programs at several clubs and later becoming involved with the Future Stars basketball academy. His work with youth players continued into the final years of his life.

In addition, Politis worked as an instructor in basketball coaching courses organized under the Greek sports authorities and was involved for many years with basketball camps in northern Greece.

== Later involvement with PAOK ==
Politis maintained close ties with PAOK after his playing and coaching careers. He was a founding member of the Association of Former PAOK Basketball Players and later held administrative positions within the organization.

He served as president of the association of former PAOK basketball players and remained involved with former players and youth basketball activities. At other points he also served as vice-president of the association.

== Death ==
Politis died on 13 June 2020 at the age of 68. His funeral was held in Kalamaria on 15 June, with former teammates, coaches and other figures from Thessaloniki basketball attending.

== Honours ==
=== Club ===
PAOK

- Greek Basketball Cup: 1984

=== National team ===
Greece

- Mediterranean Games bronze medal: 1971
