= A2 National Women's Basketball =

Women's basketball league in Greece

- Sport: Basketball
- Founded: 1997
- First season: 1997–98
- No. of teams: 23
- Country: Greece
- Continent: (European Union) Europe
- Promotion to: A1 National Women's Basketball
- Website: basket.gr/

A2 National Women's Basketball, also known as A2 Ethniki Women's Basketball, is the 2nd-tier level women's basketball league in Greece. It is organized by the Hellenic Basketball Federation (E.O.K.). Each season, the top two placed teams of the league are promoted to the top-tier level Greek women's division.

== History ==
The A2 National began with the 1997–98 season. The league was split into a two groups format (North-South), starting with the 2003–04 season.

== Champions ==
| Season | 1st Group (South) | 2nd Group (North) |
|---|---|---|
| 2003–04 | Aris Cholargou | MAS Kastorias |
| 2004–05 | Aris Thivas | GAS Komotini |
| 2005–06 | Aris Cholargou | Iraklis Thessaloniki |
| 2006–07 | Athinaikos | Aias Evosmou |
| 2007–08 | Paleo Faliro | Apollon Kalamarias |
| 2008–09 | FEA Filadelfeia/Chalkidona | Aris Thessaloniki |
| 2009–10 | Proteas Voulas | PAOK |
| 2010–11 | Asteras Exarchion | Apollon Kalamarias |
| 2011–12 | Elliniko | Olympiacos Volou |
| 2012–13 | Proteas Voulas | Anagennisi Neou Rysiou |
| 2013–14 | Terpsithea Glyfadas | Panathlitikos Sykeon |
| 2014–15 | Kronos Agiou Dimitriou | Niki Lefkadas |
| 2015–16 | Dafni Agiou Dimitriou | Aris Thessaloniki |
| 2016–17 | Keratsini Lighthouse | Olympiacos Volos |
| 2017–18 | Sporting | Iraklis Thessaloniki |
| 2018–19 | Panathinaikos | Panathlitikos Sykeon |
