= 1991–92 FIBA European Cup =

- League: FIBA European Cup
- Sport: Basketball

Final
- Champions: (Spain) Real Madrid Asegurator
- Runners-up: (Greece) PAOK

FIBA European Cup seasons
- ← 1990–91 1992–93 →

The 1991–92 FIBA European Cup was the twenty-sixth edition of FIBA's 2nd-tier level European-wide professional club basketball competition.

== Participants ==
Country	Teams	Clubs	
France	2	Limoges CSP	Pau Orthez
Greece	2	PAOK	Panionios
Israel	2	Hapoel Galil Elyon	Hapoel Holon
(West Germany) Germany	2	Alba Berlin	Braunschweig
Netherlands	2	Bestmate Akrides	Pro-Specs EBBC
Soviet Union	2	Spartak Leningrad	VEF Riga
Austria	1	Union SPI	
Belgium	1	Sunair Oostende	
Bulgaria	1	Slavia Sofia	
(Czech Republic) Czechoslovakia	1	Sparta Praha	
Cyprus	1	APOEL	
Denmark	1	Værløse	
Finland	1	NMKY Helsinki	
Hungary	1	Honved	
Iceland	1	KR	
Italy	1	Glaxo Verona	
Luxembourg	1	Etzella	
Poland	1	Lech Poznan	
Portugal	1	Porto	
Romania	1	Universitatea Cluj	
Slovenia	1	Smelt Olimpija	
Spain	1	Real Madrid Asegurator	
Sweden	1	Solna	
Turkey	1	Tofas	

== First round ==
Team 1	Agg.	Team 2	1st leg	2nd leg
Værløse (Denmark)	178–231	(Finland) NMKY Helsinki	93–107	85–124
Slavia Sofia (Bulgaria)	147–181	(Greece) Panionios	77–83	70–98
KR (Iceland)	152–163	(Austria) Union SPI	87–89	65–74
VEF Rīga (Soviet Union)	205–178	(Germany) Braunschweig	109–99	96–79
Solna (Sweden)	147-154	(Netherlands) Pro-Specs EBBC	72–68	75–86
Honvéd (Hungary)	176–150	(Poland) Lech Poznań	84–69	92–81

== Second round ==
Team 1	Agg.	Team 2	1st leg	2nd leg
NMKY Helsinki (Finland)	135–150	(Germany) Alba Berlin	71–69	64–81
Sparta Praha (Czechoslovakia)	171–184	(Greece) Panionios	87–81	84–103
Union SPI (Austria)	136–180	(Israel) Hapoel Galil Elyon	67–87	69–93
VEF Rīga (Soviet Union)	156–166	(Slovenia) Smelt Olimpija	81–89	75–77
Pro-Specs EBBC (Netherlands)	169-190	(Spain) Real Madrid Asegurator	94–94	75–96
Honvéd (Hungary)	157–210	(Israel) Hapoel Holon	90–99	67–111
Spartak Leningrad (Soviet Union)	186–153	(Portugal) Porto	109–69	77–84
APOEL (Cyprus)	107–217	(Greece) PAOK	53–111	54–106
Bestmate Akrides (Netherlands)	134–151	(Belgium) Sunair Oostende	68–63	66–88
Etzella (Luxembourg)	140–242	(France) Limoges CSP	68-123	72-119
Tofaş (Turkey)	144-199	(Italy) Glaxo Verona	77–101	67–98
Universitatea Cluj (Romania)	196-201	(France) Pau-Orthez	107-101	89–100

== Third round ==
- Wild card to participate in the European Cup for the Loser clubs* of the 1/16 finals of the 1991–92 FIBA European League.

*Śląsk Wrocław, Maccabi Rishon LeZion, KTP Kotka, Scania Södertälje, Vevey, Pezoporikos Larnaca, Fenerbahçe, Benfica and Szolnoki Olajbányász.

Team 1	Agg.	Team 2	1st leg	2nd leg
Śląsk Wrocław (Poland)	178 - 186	(Israel) Maccabi Rishon LeZion	92–85	86–101
KTP (Finland)	160–208	(France) Limoges CSP	86–110	74–98
Scania Södertälje (Sweden)	152-183	(Italy) Glaxo Verona	81–88	71–95
Smelt Olimpija (Slovenia)	201–174	(Switzerland) Vevey	114–86	87–88
Spartak Leningrad (Soviet Union)	167–174	(Belgium) Sunair Oostende	75–86	92–88
Panionios (Greece)	222–180	(Cyprus) Pezoporikos Larnaca	118–95	104–85
Alba Berlin (Germany)	181–161	(Turkey) Fenerbahçe	99–83	82–78
Hapoel Galil Elyon (Israel)	190–170	(Israel) Hapoel Holon	100–89	90–81
Benfica (Portugal)	175-153	(Hungary) Szolnoki Olajbányász	100–69	75–84

Automatically qualified to the group stage

- (Greece) PAOK (title holder)
- (Spain) Real Madrid Asegurator
- (France) Pau-Orthez

== Quarterfinals round ==
Key to colors
Top two places in the group advance to semifinals

=== Group A ===
	Team	Pld	Pts	W	L	PF	PA	PD
1.	(Greece) PAOK	10	19	9	1	829	762	+67
2.	(Italy) Glaxo Verona	10	18	8	2	862	818	+44
3.	(France) Limoges CSP	10	14	4	6	855	841	+14
4.	(Belgium) Sunair Oostende	10	14	4	6	935	903	+32
5.	(Israel) Maccabi Rishon LeZion	10	13	3	7	891	959	-68
6.	(Germany) Alba Berlin	10	12	2	8	758	847	-89

=== Group B ===
	Team	Pld	Pts	W	L	PF	PA	PD
1.	(Spain) Real Madrid Asegurator	10	19	9	1	917	832	+85
2.	(Slovenia) Smelt Olimpija	10	17	7	3	878	829	+49
3.	(France) Pau-Orthez	10	16	6	4	899	889	+10
4.	(Greece) Panionios	10	13	3	7	832	847	-15
5.	(Portugal) Benfica	10	13	3	7	787	851	-64
6.	(Israel) Hapoel Galil Elyon	10	12	2	8	877	942	-65

== Semifinals ==
Seeded teams played games 2 and 3 at home.

Team 1	Agg.	Team 2	1st leg	2nd leg	3rd leg
Smelt Olimpija (Slovenia)	1–2	(Greece) PAOK	81–68	61–79	86-104
Glaxo Verona (Italy)	0–2	(Spain) Real Madrid Asegurator	71–79	72–74	

== Final ==
March 17, Palais des Sports de Beaulieu, Nantes

Team 1	Score	Team 2
Real Madrid Asegurator (Spain)	65–63	(Greece) PAOK

== Rosters ==
(Spain) Real Madrid: José Miguel Antunez, José Biriukov, Mark Simpson, Rickey Brown, Antonio Martin (C); Jose Luis Llorente, Josep Cargol, Fernando Romay. Coach: Clifford Luyk
(Greece) PAOK: Nikos Boudouris, Branislav Prelevic Panagiotis Papachronis, Ken Barlow, Panagiotis Fassoulas (C); Nikos Filippou, Nikos Stavropoulos. Coach: Dusan Ivkovic

1991–92 FIBA European Cup Champions

Real Madrid Asegurator
3rd title

== See also ==
- 1991–92 FIBA EuroLeague
- 1991–92 FIBA Korać Cup
