= Aris Thessaloniki Women's Basketball =

Aris Thessaloniki
- Leagues: Greek Championship; Greek Cup
- Founded: 1946
- Arena: Nick Galis Hall
- Location: Thessaloniki, Greece
- Team colors
- Head coach: Giorgos Ataktidis
- Website: arisac.gr
Home	Away

Aris Thessaloniki Women's Basketball is the women's basketball department of Aris Thessaloniki, the Greek multi-sport club based in Thessaloniki. The club plays in A2 Ethniki (2nd tier) but recently it has played in A1 Ethniki. In 2015-2016 season is on the first place of the second category. The team have been going between these 2 divisions for the past decade.

== History ==
The women's team of Aris was founded in 1946 thanks to initiatives of Phaedon Matthaiou. Some years later, the club ceased their activities but returned in the 1980s. The season 2009-10 played in A1 Ethniki for first time and the next season played in EuroCup Women but disqualified by Dynamo Novosibirsk. In season 2013-14, Aris finished in 7th place but withdrew from the championship due to financial problems and relegated to A2 Ethniki.

=== Recent seasons ===
Season	Division	Place	Notes
2008-09	A2 Ethniki	1st	Promoted to A1
2009-10	A1 Ethniki	5th
2010-11	A1 Ethniki	4th
2011-12	A1 Ethniki	8th
2012-13	A1 Ethniki	6th
2013-14	A1 Ethniki	7th	Relegated to A2
2014-15	A2 Ethniki	9th
2015-16	A2 Ethniki	1st	Promoted to A1
2016-17	A1 Ethniki	10th	Relegated to A2
2017-18	A1 Ethniki	9th

== Roster ==
Note: Flags indicate national team eligibility at FIBA-sanctioned events. Players may hold other non-FIBA nationalities not displayed.

Aris Women's Basketball roster
Players
Coaches

Pos.	No.	Nat.	Name	Ht.	Wt.	Age
G	5	(Greece)	Antoniadou, Athina	1.74 m (5 ft 9 in)		28 – 19 October 1996
C	8	(Greece)	Katsamouri, Maria	1.91 m (6 ft 3 in)		27 – 25 February 1998
C	9	(Greece)	Koufogianni, Zafiro	1.88 m (6 ft 2 in)		38 – 6 March 1987
SG	10	(United States)	McKenzie, Miriam	1.77 m (5 ft 10 in)		34 – 6 November 1990
F	11	(Greece)	Papardela, Vasiliki	1.78 m (5 ft 10 in)		27 – 28 February 1998
F	12	(Greece)	Tranta, Maro	1.75 m (5 ft 9 in)		33 – 21 February 1992
F/C	13	(United States)	Montgomery, Brittni	1.90 m (6 ft 3 in)		33 – 22 March 1992
F	14	(Greece)	Glezaki, Eugenia	1.79 m (5 ft 10 in)		32 – 4 January 1993
G/F	16	(Greece)	Karaveli, Mairi	1.79 m (5 ft 10 in)		33 – 18 April 1992
G	17	(Greece)	Vantsiouri, Maria	1.81 m (5 ft 11 in)		24 – 7 July 2001
G	18	(Greece)	Giannousiou, Kalliopi	1.81 m (5 ft 11 in)		25 – 9 September 2000
C	19	(Greece)	Bountouka, Roxani	1.87 m (6 ft 2 in)		25 – 22 July 2000
G	20	(Greece)	Kilazidou, Chrysa	1.72 m (5 ft 8 in)		28 – 8 March 1997

Head coach

- (Greece) Giorgos Ataktidis

Legend

- (C) Team captain
- Injured
