= Olympiacos Volou B.C. =

Greek basketball team

- Leagues: A1 ESKATH (Men's team); A2 Ethniki (Women's team)
- Founded: 1952 (Men's team); 1971 (Women's team)
- Arena: Volos Municipal Stadium Indoor Hall
- Location: Volos
- Team colors
- President: Nikos Tsekouras
- Head coach: Giorgos Kosmatos (Men's team); Kostas Dervos (Women's team)
Home	Away

Olympiacos Volou B.C. is the basketball department of the Greek multi-sport club of Olympiacos Volou, based in Volos. The club has teams both men's and women's. The women's basketball team stands out from the departments of the club because it is the only department of Olympiacos Volou that has won a Greek Championship. The club plays in Volos Municipal Stadium Indoor Hall, with a capacity of 1200 spectators.

== Women's team ==
Olympiacos Volou won one Greek championship of the season 1977–78. It is the only title of the club. In 1997, it played in the final of Greek cup. The next years the club weakened and the late 1990s dissolved. The club returned in the action after merging with the Volos' club Artemis Volou. The last years, Olympiacos finds itself between A1 and A2 division.

=== Recent seasons ===
Season	Division	Place	Notes
2010–11	A1 Ethniki	11th	Relegated to A2
2011–12	A2 Ethniki	1st	Promoted to A1
2012–13	A1 Ethniki	10th	Relegated to A2
2013–14	A2 Ethniki	2nd	Promoted to A1
2014–15	A1 Ethniki	11th	Relegated to A2
2015–16	A2 Ethniki	3rd	
2016–17	A2 Ethniki	1st	Promoted to A1

== Honours ==
- Greek Women's Basketball League
  - Winner (1): 1978
- Greek Women's Basketball Cup
  - Finalist (1): 1997

== European History ==
Olympiacos Volos has also three historic participations in European competitions 1978-79, 1994-95, 1995-96. The biggest distinction was the qualification to the 16 European teams of Liliana Ronketti in the 1994-95 season with coaches Eleni Papathanasiou and Giorgos Delikouras.

== Notable players ==
- (Greece) Nikos Boudouris
- (Greece) Panagiotis Liadelis

== Notable supporters ==
- Nikos Boudouris, basketball player and coach
