= 1989–90 FIBA European Cup Winners' Cup =

- League: FIBA European Cup Winners' Cup
- Sport: Basketball

Finals
- Champions: (Italy) Knorr Bologna
- Runners-up: (Spain) Real Madrid

FIBA European Cup Winners' Cup seasons
- ← 1988–89 1990–91 →

The 1989–90 FIBA European Cup Winners' Cup was the twenty-fourth edition of FIBA's 2nd-tier level European-wide professional club basketball competition, contested between national domestic cup champions, running from 26 September 1989, to 13 March 1990. It was contested by 21 teams, the same number of teams as the previous edition.

Knorr Bologna defeated Real Madrid, in the final that was held in Florence, winning its first European-wide title. It had previously lost the 1977–78 final against Gabetti Cantù.

== Participants ==
Country	Teams	Clubs
Austria	1	Scholl Wels
Belgium	1	Sunair Oostende
Bulgaria	1	CSKA Sofia
Cyprus	1	Apollon Limassol
England	1	Manchester United
Finland	1	Saab UU
France	1	FC Mulhouse
Greece	1	PAOK
Hungary	1	Honvéd
Iceland	1	Njarðvík
Israel	1	Maccabi Ramat Gan
Italy	1	Knorr Bologna
Luxembourg	1	T71 Dudelange
Netherlands	1	Nashua EBBC
Portugal	1	Ovarense
Soviet Union	1	Žalgiris
Spain	1	Real Madrid
Sweden	1	Södertälje
Turkey	1	Çukurova Üniversitesi
West Germany	1	Bayer 04 Leverkusen
(Socialist Federal Republic of Yugoslavia) Yugoslavia	1	Partizan

== First round ==
Team 1	Agg.	Team 2	1st leg	2nd leg
Saab UU (Finland)	177–176	(England) Manchester United	100–93	77–83
Sunair Oostende (Belgium)	145–137	(Netherlands) Nashua EBBC	75–69	70–68
Scholl Wels (Austria)	154–224	(Portugal) Ovarense	91–113	63–111
Njarðvík (Iceland)	155–216	(West Germany) Bayer 04 Leverkusen	81–112	74–104
Honvéd (Hungary)	151–198	(Turkey) Çukurova Üniversitesi	70-93	81–105

== Second round ==
Team 1	Agg.	Team 2	1st leg	2nd leg
Saab UU (Finland)	186–188	(Israel) Maccabi Ramat Gan	96–93	90–95
Södertälje (Sweden)	140–146	(Belgium) Sunair Oostende	78–72	62–74
Ovarense (Portugal)	150–218	(Greece) PAOK	83–101	67–117
Bayer 04 Leverkusen (West Germany)	174–184	(France) FC Mulhouse	97–88	77–96
Çukurova Üniversitesi (Turkey)	136–179	(Italy) Knorr Bologna	72-71	64–108
CSKA Sofia (Bulgaria)	179–204	(Spain) Real Madrid	92-109	87–95
Apollon Limassol (Cyprus)	139–182	(Socialist Federal Republic of Yugoslavia) Partizan	71-100	68–82
T71 Dudelange (Luxembourg)	149–240	(Soviet Union) Žalgiris	80-112	69–128

== Quarterfinals ==
Key to colors
Top two places in each group advance to semifinals

=== Group A ===
	(Italy) KNO	(Soviet Union) ŽAL	(Belgium) OOS	(Israel) MRG
(Italy) KNO		102-79	93-85	86-73
(Soviet Union) ŽAL	83-86		101-82	84-82
(Belgium) OOS	69-78	102-82		92-95
(Israel) MRG	96-95	90-93	107-116	

	Team	Pld	Pts	W	L	PF	PA	PD
1.	(Italy) Knorr Bologna	6	11	5	1	540	485	+55
2.	(Soviet Union) Žalgiris	6	9	3	3	522	544	-22
3.	(Belgium) Sunair Oostende	6	8	2	4	546	556	-10
4.	(Israel) Maccabi Ramat Gan	6	8	2	4	543	566	-23

=== Group B ===
	(Spain) RMD	(Greece) PAOK	(Socialist Federal Republic of Yugoslavia) PAR	(France) MUL
(Spain) RMD		92-71	101-76	91-86
(Greece) PAOK	80-77		93-81	92-76
(Socialist Federal Republic of Yugoslavia) PAR	88-105	95-79		91-83
(France) MUL	76-100	81-82	80-71	

	Team	Pld	Pts	W	L	PF	PA	PD
1.	(Spain) Real Madrid	6	11	5	1	566	477	+89
2.	(Greece) PAOK	6	10	4	2	497	502	-5
3.	(Socialist Federal Republic of Yugoslavia) Partizan	6	8	2	4	502	541	-39
4.	(France) FC Mulhouse	6	7	1	5	482	527	-45

== Semifinals ==
Team 1	Agg.	Team 2	1st leg	2nd leg
Knorr Bologna (Italy)	171–157	(Greece) PAOK	77–57	94–100
Real Madrid (Spain)	170–169	(Soviet Union) Žalgiris	93–80	77–89

== Final ==
March 13, PalaGiglio, Florence

Team 1	Score	Team 2
Knorr Bologna (Italy)	79–74	(Spain) Real Madrid

1989–90 FIBA European Cup Winners' Cup Champions

Knorr Bologna
1st title
