= Nikos Boudouris =

Greek basketball player (born 1971)

Nikos Boudouris Νίκος Μπουντούρης
PAOK
- Title: General manager
- League: Greek Basket League GBL

Personal information
- Born: September 25, 1971 (age 55) Volos, Greece
- Listed height: 6 ft 4 in (1.93 m)
- Listed weight: 190 lb (86 kg)

Career information
- NBA draft: 1993: undrafted
- Playing career: 1989–2008
- Position: Point guard / shooting guard

Career history
- 1989–1998: PAOK
- 1998–2000: Panathinaikos
- 2000–2003: Olympiacos
- 2003–2004: Makedonikos
- 2004–2006: Maroussi
- 2006–2007: Olympias Patras
- 2007–2008: Maroussi

Career highlights
- As player: EuroLeague champion (2000); FIBA European Cup Winners' Cup champion (1991); FIBA Korać Cup champion (1994); 3× Greek League champion (1992, 1999, 2000); 2× Greek Cup winner (1995, 2002)
Medals
Men's basketball
Representing Greece
Mediterranean Games
Silver medal – second place	1991 Greece	Under-26
FIBA Europe U20 Championship
Silver medal – second place	1992 Greece	Under-20

Nikolaos "Nikos" Boudouris (alternate spellings: Bountouris, Mpoudouris, Mpountouris, Greek: Νικόλαος "Νίκος" Μπουντούρης; born 25 September 1971 in Volos, Greece) is a former Greek professional basketball player and coach. During his pro playing career, Boudouris won what were at the time, all three of the major European-wide club championships, as he won the top-tier level FIBA EuroLeague championship in 2000, the second-tier level FIBA European Cup Winners' Cup championship in 1991, and the third tier level FIBA Korać Cup championship in 1994.

== Early career ==
Boudouris started his club basketball career with the youth team of the Greek club Olympiacos Volou. In 1989, he moved to the Greek club PAOK Thessaloníki, at the age of 18.

== Professional career ==
While playing with PAOK, Boudouris won the European secondary level FIBA European Cup Winners' Cup title in the 1990–91 season, and the European third-tier level FIBA Korać Cup title, in the 1993–94 season. With PAOK, he also won the Greek League championship in the 1991–92 season, and the Greek Cup title in 1995. Boudouris was also a two-time FIBA European Cup finalist, in the 1991–92 and the 1995–96 seasons, while with PAOK. In 1998, he moved to the Greek club Panathinaikos Athens, and he won the EuroLeague championship with them, at the 2000 EuroLeague Final Four. Boudouris also won two Greek League championships with Panathinaikos, in the 1999–00 and 2000–01 seasons.

In 2000, Boudouris moved to the Greek club Olympiacos Piraeus, and with them he won the Greek Cup title in 2002. In 2003, he moved to the Greek club Makedonikos, and in 2004, he moved on to the Greek club Maroussi Athens. While playing with Maroussi, he helped the team finish in the second-place position in the Greek League's regular season in the 2004–05 season. He was also a Greek Cup finalist with Maroussi in 2006. In 2008, he announced his retirement from playing professional club basketball.

== National team career ==
As a member of the senior men's Greek national team, Boudouris was on the Greek team that finished in the fourth-place position at both the 1994 FIBA World Championship and the 1998 FIBA World Championship. He also played with Greece at the 1997 EuroBasket, where they finished in 4th place, and at the 1999 EuroBasket.

== Executive career ==
Before the start of the 2008–09 season, Boudouris was hired as the technical director of the Greek basketball club PAOK Thessaloniki.

== Coaching career ==
After working as the Technical Director of PAOK, Boudouris became the Team Manager of Olympiacos Piraeus. After that, he became the head coach of a minor league team located in Vrilissia, Greece. After that, he moved back to Volos, in 2022, where he went on to coach the cadets squad of his childhood club, Olympiacos Volou.
