= Pete Papahronis =

Greek–American basketball player

Personal information
- Born: October 17, 1967 (age 59) Oklahoma, United States
- Listed height: 6 ft 7.53 in (2.02 m)

Career information
- High school: Putnam City (Warr Acres, Oklahoma)
- College: East Central (1985–1989)
- NBA draft: 1989: undrafted
- Playing career: 1989–2000
- Position: Power forward
- Number: 11

Career history
- 1989–1992: PAOK
- 1992–1996: Iraklis Thessaloniki
- 1996–1997: AEK Athens
- 1997–1998: Iraklio
- 1998–2000: Maroussi

Career highlights
- Greek League champion (1992); European Cup Winners' Cup champion (1991)

Panagiotis "Pete" Papahronis (alternate spelling: Papachronis) (Greek: Παναγιώτης «Πιτ» Παπαχρόνης; born October 17, 1967) is a former Greek–American professional basketball player.

== Professional career ==
Papahronis graduated from East Central University in 1989, and the same year he joined to P.A.O.K. BC along with his cousin Chris Papasarantou. He played four years with PAOK and he won the 1991 and the Greek League champion in 1992. At the final against Zaragoza, Papahronis disqualified with five fouls at the beginning of the second half. Moreover, he was one of the most special players of PAOK's fans.

In 1992, he moved to Iraklis Thessaloniki B.C. as an exchange for Christos Tsekos transfer. Papahronis played four years with Iraklis and they reached at the semifinals of the 1994–95 FIBA European Cup. His best season was 1993–94, when he has 10.6 points per game at Greek Basketball League. In 1996, he signed with AEK, having confined participation. He also played with Iraklio B.C. and Maroussi B.C., finishing his career in 2000.

== Coaching career ==
Papahronis returned to the United States and became a high school basketball coach. In 2003, he joined Guthrie High School, and led its boys' team in five state tournaments, winning the consecutive titles in 2008 and 2009. In 2012, he became coach of the girls' team. In 2014, he was hired by Edmond North High School and assumed coaching the girls' team as well as teaching a recreational basketball course.

== Personal ==
His daughter Elle (Eleni) joined at San Francisco Dons.
