= Nikos Stavropoulos =

Greek basketball player

Personal information
- Born: June 17, 1959 (age 67) Larissa, Greece
- Listed height: 6 ft 5 in (1.96 m)
- Listed weight: 230 lb (104 kg)

Career information
- Playing career: 1975–1994
- Position: Point guard / shooting guard
- Number: 5

Career history

Playing
- 1975–1983: G.S. Larissas
- 1983–1992: PAOK
- 1992–1994: Iraklis

Coaching
- 1997–1998: Greece (assistant)
- 2000–2003: Greece Junior national teams
- Olympia Larissa

Career highlights
- As a player: FIBA Saporta Cup champion (1991); Greek League champion (1992); Greek Cup winner (1984); Greek Cup Finals Top Scorer (1984)
Medals
Men's basketball
Representing Greece
EuroBasket
Gold medal – first place	1987 Greece
Head coach
Mediterranean Games
Silver medal – second place	2001 Tunis	Under-26
Albert Schweitzer U-18 World Tournament
Silver medal – second place	2000 Mannheim	Under-18

Nikolaos "Nikos" Stavropoulos (Greek: Νικόλαος "Νίκος" Σταυρόπουλος; born June 17, 1959), a.k.a. Professor Nicholas "Magic" Stavropoulos, is a former Greek professional basketball player and coach. During his club playing career, at a height of 1.96 m (6 ft 5 in) tall, Stavropoulos played at the point guard and shooting guard positions. During his playing career, Stavropoulos was known for his dazzling passing skills, and his spectacular play-making ability, which garnered him the nickname "Magic", or "Greek Magic", after NBA player Magic Johnson, who played during the same era, and was also known for his dazzling passes and play-making ability.

Stavropoulos is the first player to make a 3-point basket in the Greek League, after the 3-point shot was first introduced into the league, in the 1984–85 season.

== Playing career ==
=== Club career ===
Stavropoulos began his club playing career with the Greek club Gymnastikos S. Larissas, in 1975. He was transferred to PAOK Thessaloniki in 1983, for the amount of 10 million Greek drachmas, which was the highest amount for a player transfer fee in the league's history to that point in time. With PAOK, Stavropoulos won the Greek Cup title in 1984, in which he was the Greek Cup Finals Top Scorer without 25 points.

With PAOK, he also won the European-wide secondary level FIBA European Cup Winners' Cup (Saporta Cup) championship in the 1990–91 season, and played in the same competition's final in the 1991–92 season. He also won the Greek League championship with PAOK in 1992. After he left PAOK, he finished his playing career with the Greek club Iraklis Thessaloniki.

=== National team career ===
Stavropoulos was also a long-time member of the senior men's Greek National Basketball Team. With Greece, he played at the 1983 EuroBasket, the 1984 FIBA European Olympic Qualifying Tournament, and at the 1986 FIBA World Championship. Ηe was also a member of the Greek national squad that won the gold medal at the 1987 EuroBasket, while playing alongside such European basketball legends as Panagiotis Giannakis, Panagiotis Fasoulas, Fanis Christodoulou, and Nikos Galis. In total, he played in 102 games with Greece, and averaged 5.2 points per game.

== Coaching career ==
After he ended his playing career, Stavropoulos became an assistant coach for the senior Greek national team, and then later the head coach of several of Greece's junior national teams. Stavropoulos also coached the Greek 2nd Division club Olympia Larissa.

== Managerial career ==
Stavropoulos also worked as the general manager of the Greek club PAOK Thessaloniki.

== Personal life ==
Stavropoulos was born in Larissa, Greece, on 17 June 1959. After his playing career, Stavropoulos opened up his well-known basketball camp called, "Magic Basketball Camp". At his basketball camp, he often worked with legendary basketball coach Bob Knight, whom he had also previously worked for as an assistant coach, on the Indiana Hoosiers Men's Basketball Team, from 1994 to 1997.
