= 1990–91 FIBA European Cup Winners' Cup =

- League: FIBA European Cup Winners' Cup
- Sport: Basketball

Finals
- Champions: (Greece) PAOK
- Runners-up: (Spain) CAI Zaragoza

FIBA European Cup Winners' Cup seasons
- ← 1989–90 1991–92 →

The 1990–91 FIBA European Cup Winners' Cup was the twenty-fifth edition of FIBA's 2nd-tier level European-wide professional club basketball competition, contested between national domestic cup champions, running from 25 September 1990, to 26 March 1991. It was contested by 19 teams, two less than the previous edition.

PAOK defeated CAI Zaragoza, in the final that was held in Geneva, winning its first European-wide title ever. It was the second Greek League club that won the FIBA Cup Winners' Cup, after AEK Athens won in the distant 1967–68 season.

== Participants ==
Country	Teams	Clubs
Belgium	1	Durox Leuven
England	1	Sunderland Saints
Finland	1	Namika Lahti
France	1	Pitch Cholet
Greece	1	PAOK
Hungary	1	Körmendi Dózsa MTE
Israel	1	Hapoel Galil Elyon
Italy	1	Knorr Bologna
Luxembourg	1	Contern
Netherlands	1	Bestmate Akrides
Poland	1	Śląsk Wrocław
Portugal	1	Ovarense
Romania	1	Balanța Sibiu
Soviet Union	1	Dynamo Moscow
Spain	1	CAI Zaragoza
Sweden	1	Uppsala
Turkey	1	Paşabahçe
West Germany	1	Steiner Bayreuth
(Socialist Federal Republic of Yugoslavia) Yugoslavia	1	Crvena zvezda

== First round ==
Team 1	Agg.	Team 2	1st leg	2nd leg
Ovarense (Portugal)	174–153	(Belgium) Durox Leuven	95–88	79–65
Uppsala (Sweden)	175–169	(Netherlands) Bestmate Akrides	95–75	80–94
Steiner Bayreuth (West Germany)	225–115	(Luxembourg) Contern	101–60	124–55

== Top 16 ==
Team 1	Agg.	Team 2	1st leg	2nd leg
Ovarense (Portugal)	161–154	(Finland) Namika Lahti	86–77	75–77
Uppsala (Sweden)	195–213	(France) Pitch Cholet	111–108	84–105
Balanța Sibiu (Romania)	141–218	(Italy) Knorr Bologna	69–105	72–113
Steiner Bayreuth (West Germany)	180–195	(Spain) CAI Zaragoza	90–94	90–101
Körmendi Dózsa MTE (Hungary)	146–199	(Soviet Union) Dynamo Moscow	74–86	72–113
Paşabahçe (Turkey)	170–171	(Socialist Federal Republic of Yugoslavia) Crvena zvezda	94–85	76–86
Sunderland Saints (England)	174–193	(Greece) PAOK	89–96	85–97
Śląsk Wrocław (Poland)	179–227	(Israel) Hapoel Galil Elyon	84–109	95–118

== Quarterfinals ==
Key to colors
Top two places in each group advance to semifinals

=== Group A ===
	(Soviet Union) DYN	(France) CHO	(Italy) KNO	(Portugal) OVA
(Soviet Union) DYN		88-109	98-78	100-83
(France) CHO	78-95		104-82	99-73
(Italy) KNO	95-90	103-80		88-68
(Portugal) OVA	68-78	69-92	69-71	

	Team	Pld	Pts	W	L	PF	PA	PD
1.	(Soviet Union) Dynamo Moscow	6	10	4	2	549	511	+38
2.	(France) Pitch Cholet	6	10	4	2	562	510	+52
3.	(Italy) Knorr Bologna	6	10	4	2	517	509	+8
4.	(Portugal) Ovarense	6	6	0	6	430	528	-98

=== Group B ===
	(Spain) ZAR	(Greece) PAOK	(Israel) HGE	(Socialist Federal Republic of Yugoslavia) CZV
(Spain) ZAR		70-64	84-81	134-113
(Greece) PAOK	112-102		107-77	91-80
(Israel) HGE	92-90	80-79*		115-92
(Socialist Federal Republic of Yugoslavia) CZV	109-113	91-75	108-101	

	Team	Pld	Pts	W	L	PF	PA	PD
1.	(Spain) CAI Zaragoza	6	10	4	2	593	571	+22
2.	(Greece) PAOK	6	9	3	3	528	500	+28
3.	(Israel) Hapoel Galil Elyon	6	9	3	3	546	560	-14
4.	(Socialist Federal Republic of Yugoslavia) Crvena zvezda	6	8	2	4	593	629	-36

- The game was held at Peristeri Arena, due to Gulf War.

== Semifinals ==
Team 1	Agg.	Team 2	1st leg	2nd leg
Pitch Cholet (France)	174–195	(Spain) CAI Zaragoza	95–105	79–90
PAOK (Greece)	158–157	(Soviet Union) Dynamo Moscow	95–82	63–75

== Final ==
March 26, Patinoire des Vernets, Geneva

Team 1	Score	Team 2
PAOK (Greece)	76–72	(Spain) CAI Zaragoza

== Rosters ==
(Greece) PAOK: Nikos Stavropoulos, Branislav Prelevic Georgios Makaras, Ken Barlow, Panagiotis Fassoulas (C); Nikos Boudouris, Panagiotis Papachronis, Memos Ioannou. Coach: Dusan Ivkovic
(Spain) CAI Zaragoza: Jose Angel Arcega (C), Mark Davis, Fernando Arcega, Enrique Andreu, Kevin Magee; Francisco J. Zapata, Joaquin Ruiz Lorente, Fran Murcia, Jose Miguel Hernandez. Coach: Manel Comas

1990–91 FIBA European Cup Winners' Cup Champions

PAOK
1st title
