= PAOK B.C. in international competitions =

PAOK B.C. in international competitions is the history and statistics of PAOK B.C. in the FIBA Europe and Euroleague Basketball Company European-wide professional club basketball competitions.

FIBA European Cup Winners' Cup	FIBA European Cup	FIBA European League	FIBA Korać Cup	FIBA European Cup
(Switzerland); Geneva; Patinoire des Vernets 1991	(France); Nantes; Palais des Sports de Beaulieu Runners-up 1992	(Greece); Piraeus; Peace and Friendship Stadium 3rd place 1993	(Italy); Trieste; Palazzo dello sport Cesare Rubini 1994	(Spain); Vitoria-Gasteiz; Pabellón Álava Runners-up 1996

== 1960s ==
=== 1959–60 FIBA European Champions Cup, 1st–tier ===
The 1959–60 FIBA European Champions Cup was the 3rd installment of the European top-tier level professional basketball club competition FIBA European Champions Cup (now called EuroLeague), running from November 18, 1959 to May 15, 1960. The trophy was won by the title holder Rīgas ASK, who defeated Dinamo Tbilisi by a result of 130–113 in a two-legged final on a home and away basis. Overall, PAOK achieved in the present competition a record of 0 wins against 2 defeats, in only one round. More detailed:

==== First round ====
- Tie played on November 29, 1959 and on December 13, 1959.

Team 1	Agg.	Team 2	1st leg	2nd leg
PAOK (Greece)	121–159	(Romania) CCA București	61–80	60–79

== 1970s ==
=== 1974–75 FIBA Korać Cup, 3rd–tier ===
The 1974–75 FIBA Korać Cup was the 4th installment of the European 3rd-tier level professional basketball club competition FIBA Korać Cup, running from November 5, 1974 to March 25, 1975. The trophy was won by the title holder Birra Forst Cantù, who defeated CF Barcelona by a result of 181–154 in a two-legged final on a home and away basis. Overall, PAOK achieved in present competition a record of 1 win against 1 defeat, in two successive rounds. More detailed:

==== First round ====
- Bye

==== Second round ====
- Tie played on November 26, 1974 and on December 3, 1974.

Team 1	Agg.	Team 2	1st leg	2nd leg
PAOK (Greece)	150–157	(Socialist Federal Republic of Yugoslavia) Bosna	77–74	73–83

=== 1975–76 FIBA Korać Cup, 3rd–tier ===
The 1975–76 FIBA Korać Cup was the 5th installment of the European 3rd-tier level professional basketball club competition FIBA Korać Cup, running from October 28, 1975 to March 23, 1976. The trophy was won by Jugoplastika, who defeated Chinamartini Torino by a result of 179–166 in a two-legged final on a home and away basis. Overall, PAOK achieved in present competition a record of 1 win against 1 defeat, in two successive rounds. More detailed:

==== First round ====
- Bye

==== Second round ====
- Tie played on November 18, 1975 and on November 25, 1975.

Team 1	Agg.	Team 2	1st leg	2nd leg
Moderne (France)	179–142	(Greece) PAOK	112–73	67–69

== 1980s ==
=== 1981–82 FIBA Korać Cup, 3rd–tier ===
The 1981–82 FIBA Korać Cup was the 11th installment of the European 3rd-tier level professional basketball club competition FIBA Korać Cup, running from October 7, 1981 to March 18, 1982. The trophy was won by Limoges CSP, who defeated Šibenka by a result of 90–84 at Palasport San Lazzaro in Padua, Italy. Overall, PAOK achieved in present competition a record of 2 wins against 2 defeats, in two successive rounds. More detailed:

==== First round ====
- Tie played on October 7, 1981 and on October 14, 1981.

Team 1	Agg.	Team 2	1st leg	2nd leg
PAOK (Greece)	201–164	(Austria) Stock 84 Wels	103–72	98–92

==== Second round ====
- Tie played on November 4, 1981 and on November 11, 1981.

Team 1	Agg.	Team 2	1st leg	2nd leg
PAOK (Greece)	181–197	(Socialist Federal Republic of Yugoslavia) Zadar	88–94	93–103

=== 1982–83 FIBA European Cup Winners' Cup, 2nd–tier ===
The 1982–83 FIBA European Cup Winners' Cup was the 17th installment of FIBA's 2nd-tier level European-wide professional club basketball competition FIBA European Cup Winners' Cup (lately called FIBA Saporta Cup), running from October 5, 1982 to March 9, 1983. The trophy was won by Scavolini Pesaro, who defeated ASVEL by a result of 111–99 at Palacio Municipal de Deportes in Palma de Mallorca, Spain. Overall, PAOK achieved in the present competition a record of 3 wins against 1 defeat, in two successive rounds. More detailed:

==== First round ====
- Tie played on October 5, 1982 and on October 12, 1982.

Team 1	Agg.	Team 2	1st leg	2nd leg
AEL (Cyprus)	105–231	(Greece) PAOK	51–120	54–111

==== Top 16 ====
- Tie played on November 2, 1982 and on November 9, 1982.

Team 1	Agg.	Team 2	1st leg	2nd leg
PAOK (Greece)	155–157	(Israel) Hapoel Ramat Gan	86–78	69–79

=== 1983–84 FIBA Korać Cup, 3rd–tier ===
The 1983–84 FIBA Korać Cup was the 13th installment of the European 3rd-tier level professional basketball club competition FIBA Korać Cup, running from September 28, 1983 to March 15, 1984. The trophy was won by Orthez, who defeated Crvena zvezda by a result of 97–73 at Palais des sports Pierre-de-Coubertin in Paris, France. Overall, PAOK achieved in present competition a record of 3 wins against 5 defeats, in three successive rounds. More detailed:

==== First round ====
- Bye

==== Second round ====
- Tie played on October 26, 1983 and on November 2, 1983.

Team 1	Agg.	Team 2	1st leg	2nd leg
Toptours Aarschot (Belgium)	184–187	(Greece) PAOK	87–74	97–113

==== Top 16 ====
- Day 1 (December 7, 1983)

Team 1	Score	Team 2
Zadar (Socialist Federal Republic of Yugoslavia)	89–80	(Greece) PAOK

- Day 2 (December 14, 1983)

Team 1	Score	Team 2
Star Varese (Italy)	93–80	(Greece) PAOK

- Day 3 (January 11, 1984)

Team 1	Score	Team 2
PAOK (Greece)	83–78	(France) Orthez

- Day 4 (January 18, 1984)

Team 1	Score	Team 2
PAOK (Greece)	67–72	(Socialist Federal Republic of Yugoslavia) Zadar

- Day 5 (January 25, 1984)

Team 1	Score	Team 2
PAOK (Greece)	81–80*	(Italy) Star Varese

^{*}Overtime at the end of regulation (73–73).

- Day 6 (February 1, 1984)

Team 1	Score	Team 2
Orthez (France)	73–58	(Greece) PAOK

- Group C standings:

Pos.	Team	Pld.	Pts.	W	L	PF	PA	PD	Tie-break
1.	(France) Orthez	6	10	4	2	503	481	+22	1–1 (0)
2.	(Socialist Federal Republic of Yugoslavia) Zadar	6	10	4	2	541	524	+17	1–1 (0)
3.	(Italy) Star Varese	6	8	2	4	524	527	-3	1–1 (+12)
4.	(Greece) PAOK	6	8	2	4	449	485	-36	1–1 (-12)

=== 1984–85 FIBA European Cup Winners' Cup, 2nd–tier ===
The 1984–85 FIBA European Cup Winners' Cup was the 19th installment of FIBA's 2nd-tier level European-wide professional club basketball competition FIBA European Cup Winners' Cup (lately called FIBA Saporta Cup), running from October 2, 1984 to March 19, 1985. The trophy was won by FC Barcelona, who defeated Žalgiris by a result of 77–73 at Palais des Sports in Grenoble, France. Overall, PAOK achieved in the present competition a record of 3 wins against 7 defeats, in three successive rounds. More detailed:

==== First round ====
- Tie played on October 2, 1984 and on October 9, 1984.

Team 1	Agg.	Team 2	1st leg	2nd leg
Csepel (Hungary)	154–215	(Greece) PAOK	73–99	81–116

==== Top 16 ====
- Tie played on October 30, 1984 and on November 6, 1984.

Team 1	Agg.	Team 2	1st leg	2nd leg
PAOK (Greece)	170–168	(Socialist Federal Republic of Yugoslavia) Bosna	88–84	82–84

==== Quarterfinals ====
- Day 1 (December 4, 1984)

Team 1	Score	Team 2
PAOK (Greece)	72–78	(Soviet Union) Žalgiris

- Day 2 (December 11, 1984)

Team 1	Score	Team 2
CAI Zaragoza (Spain)	80–76	(Greece) PAOK

- Day 3 (January 9, 1985)

Team 1	Score	Team 2
Landys&Gyr Wien (Austria)	86–84	(Greece) PAOK

- Day 4 (January 15, 1985)

Team 1	Score	Team 2
Žalgiris (Soviet Union)	102–96	(Greece) PAOK

- Day 5 (January 23, 1985)

Team 1	Score	Team 2
PAOK (Greece)	86–89	(Spain) CAI Zaragoza

- Day 6 (January 29, 1985)

Team 1	Score	Team 2
PAOK (Greece)	93–96	(Austria) Landys&Gyr Wien

- Group A standings:

Pos.	Team	Pld.	Pts.	W	L	PF	PA	PD
1.	(Soviet Union) Žalgiris	6	12	6	0	619	537	+82
2.	(Spain) CAI Zaragoza	6	10	4	2	523	539	-16
3.	(Austria) Landys&Gyr Wien	6	8	2	4	589	631	+42
4.	(Greece) PAOK	6	6	0	6	507	531	-24

=== 1985–86 FIBA Korać Cup, 3rd–tier ===
The 1985–86 FIBA Korać Cup was the 15th installment of the European 3rd-tier level professional basketball club competition FIBA Korać Cup, running from October 2, 1985 to March 27, 1986. The trophy was won by Banco di Roma, who defeated Mobilgirgi Caserta by a result of 157–150 in a two-legged final on a home and away basis. Overall, PAOK achieved in present competition a record of 5 wins against 5 defeats, in three successive rounds. More detailed:

==== First round ====
- Tie played on October 2, 1985 and on October 9, 1985.

Team 1	Agg.	Team 2	1st leg	2nd leg
Levski-Spartak (Bulgaria)	188–191	(Greece) PAOK	105–87	83–104

==== Second round ====
- Tie played on October 30, 1985 and on November 6, 1985.

Team 1	Agg.	Team 2	1st leg	2nd leg
Boule d'or Andenne (Belgium)	157–188	(Greece) PAOK	81–96	76–92

==== Top 16 ====
- Day 1 (December 4, 1985)

Team 1	Score	Team 2
PAOK (Greece)	100–92	(Italy) Berloni Torino

- Day 2 (December 11, 1985)

Team 1	Score	Team 2
PAOK (Greece)	73–70	(Socialist Federal Republic of Yugoslavia) Zadar

- Day 3 (January 8, 1986)

Team 1	Score	Team 2
Olympique Antibes (France)	90–83	(Greece) PAOK

- Day 4 (January 15, 1986)

Team 1	Score	Team 2
Berloni Torino (Italy)	97–82	(Greece) PAOK

- Day 5 (January 22, 1986)

Team 1	Score	Team 2
Zadar (Socialist Federal Republic of Yugoslavia)	98–79	(Greece) PAOK

- Day 6 (January 29, 1986)

Team 1	Score	Team 2
PAOK (Greece)	67–88	(France) Olympique Antibes

- Group B standings:

Pos.	Team	Pld.	Pts.	W	L	PF	PA	PD	Tie-break
1.	(France) Olympique Antibes	6	10	4	2	513	478	+35	1–1 (+10)
2.	(Italy) Berloni Torino	6	10	4	2	548	525	+23	1–1 (-10)
3.	(Socialist Federal Republic of Yugoslavia) Zadar	6	8	2	4	509	516	-7	1–1 (+16)
4.	(Greece) PAOK	6	8	2	4	484	535	-51	1–1 (-16)

=== 1986–87 FIBA Korać Cup, 3rd–tier ===
The 1986–87 FIBA Korać Cup was the 16th installment of the European 3rd-tier level professional basketball club competition FIBA Korać Cup, running from October 1, 1986 to March 25, 1987. The trophy was won by FC Barcelona, who defeated Limoges CSP by a result of 203–171 in a two-legged final on a home and away basis. Overall, PAOK achieved in present competition a record of 2 wins against 2 defeats, in two successive rounds. More detailed:

==== First round ====
- Tie played on October 1, 1986 and on October 8, 1986.

Team 1	Agg.	Team 2	1st leg	2nd leg
CSKA Sofia (Bulgaria)	162–172	(Greece) PAOK	85–83	77–89

==== Second round ====
- Tie played on October 29, 1986 and on November 5, 1986.

Team 1	Agg.	Team 2	1st leg	2nd leg
PAOK (Greece)	154–159	(Socialist Federal Republic of Yugoslavia) Partizan	79–69	75–90

=== 1987–88 FIBA Korać Cup, 3rd–tier ===
The 1987–88 FIBA Korać Cup was the 17th installment of the European 3rd-tier level professional basketball club competition FIBA Korać Cup, running from September 23, 1987 to March 9, 1988. The trophy was won by Real Madrid, who defeated Cibona by a result of 195–183 in a two-legged final on a home and away basis. Overall, PAOK achieved in present competition a record of 3 wins against 5 defeats, in three successive rounds. More detailed:

==== First round ====
- Bye

==== Second round ====
- Tie played on October 14, 1987 and on October 21, 1987.

Team 1	Agg.	Team 2	1st leg	2nd leg
Olympique Antibes (France)	189–209	(Greece) PAOK	82–98	107–111

==== Top 16 ====
- Day 1 (December 2, 1987)

Team 1	Score	Team 2
PAOK (Greece)	88–86	(Spain) Estudiantes Todagrés

- Day 2 (December 8, 1987)

Team 1	Score	Team 2
PAOK (Greece)	88–93	(Socialist Federal Republic of Yugoslavia) Crvena zvezda

- Day 3 (December 16, 1987)

Team 1	Score	Team 2
ASVEL (France)	109–99	(Greece) PAOK

- Day 4 (January 6, 1988)

Team 1	Score	Team 2
Estudiantes Todagrés (Spain)	83–81	(Greece) PAOK

- Day 5 (January 13, 1988)

Team 1	Score	Team 2
Crvena zvezda (Socialist Federal Republic of Yugoslavia)	93–88*	(Greece) PAOK

^{*}Overtime at the end of regulation (83–83).

- Day 6 (January 20, 1988)

Team 1	Score	Team 2
PAOK (Greece)	80–81	(France) ASVEL

- Group C standings:

Pos.	Team	Pld.	Pts.	W	L	PF	PA	PD
1.	(Socialist Federal Republic of Yugoslavia) Crvena zvezda	6	11	5	1	582	517	+65
2.	(France) ASVEL	6	10	4	2	548	508	+40
3.	(Spain) Estudiantes Todagrés	6	8	2	4	483	567	-84
4.	(Greece) PAOK	6	7	1	5	524	545	-21

=== 1988–89 FIBA Korać Cup, 3rd–tier ===
The 1988–89 FIBA Korać Cup was the 18th installment of the European 3rd-tier level professional basketball club competition FIBA Korać Cup, running from October 12, 1988 to March 22, 1989. The trophy was won by Partizan, who defeated Wiwa Vismara Cantù by a result of 177–171 in a two-legged final on a home and away basis. Overall, PAOK achieved in present competition a record of 3 wins against 1 defeat, in two successive rounds. More detailed:

==== First round ====
- Tie played on October 12, 1988 and on October 19, 1988.

Team 1	Agg.	Team 2	1st leg	2nd leg
ASVEL (France)	161–218	(Greece) PAOK	83–93	78–125

==== Second round ====
- Tie played on November 2, 1988 and on November 9, 1988.

Team 1	Agg.	Team 2	1st leg	2nd leg
PAOK (Greece)	171–171*	(Socialist Federal Republic of Yugoslavia) Crvena zvezda	95–85	76–86

^{*}Although the global basket average between PAOK and Crvena zvezda was tied at the end of the match, the Yugoslavian club qualified because of their higher number of away points (85 vs. 76).

== 1990s ==
=== 1989–90 FIBA European Cup Winners' Cup, 2nd–tier ===
The 1989–90 FIBA European Cup Winners' Cup was the 24th installment of FIBA's 2nd-tier level European-wide professional club basketball competition FIBA European Cup Winners' Cup (lately called FIBA Saporta Cup), running from September 26, 1989 to March 13, 1990. The trophy was won by Knorr Bologna, who defeated the title holder Real Madrid by a result of 79–74 at PalaGiglio in Florence, Italy. Overall, PAOK achieved in the present competition a record of 7 wins against 3 defeats, in four successive rounds. More detailed:

==== First round ====
- Bye

==== Top 16 ====
- Tie played on October 24, 1989 and on October 31, 1989.

Team 1	Agg.	Team 2	1st leg	2nd leg
Ovarense (Portugal)	150–218	(Greece) PAOK	83–101	67–117

==== Quarterfinals ====
- Day 1 (December 5, 1989)

Team 1	Score	Team 2
Real Madrid (Spain)	92–71	(Greece) PAOK

- Day 2 (December 12, 1989)

Team 1	Score	Team 2
FC Mulhouse (France)	81–82	(Greece) PAOK

- Day 3 (January 16, 1990)

Team 1	Score	Team 2
PAOK (Greece)	93–81	(Socialist Federal Republic of Yugoslavia) Partizan

- Day 4 (January 23, 1990)

Team 1	Score	Team 2
PAOK (Greece)	80–77	(Spain) Real Madrid

- Day 5 (January 30, 1990)

Team 1	Score	Team 2
PAOK (Greece)	92–76	(France) FC Mulhouse

- Day 6 (February 6, 1990)

Team 1	Score	Team 2
Partizan (Socialist Federal Republic of Yugoslavia)	95–79	(Greece) PAOK

- Group B standings:

Pos.	Team	Pld.	Pts.	W	L	PF	PA	PD
1.	(Spain) Real Madrid	6	11	5	1	566	477	+89
2.	(Greece) PAOK	6	10	4	2	497	502	-5
3.	(Socialist Federal Republic of Yugoslavia) Partizan	6	8	2	4	502	541	-39
4.	(France) FC Mulhouse	6	7	1	5	482	527	-45

==== Semifinals ====
- Tie played on February 20, 1990 and on February 27, 1990.

Team 1	Agg.	Team 2	1st leg	2nd leg
Knorr Bologna (Italy)	171–157	(Greece) PAOK	77–57	94–100

=== 1990–91 FIBA European Cup Winners' Cup, 2nd–tier ===
The 1990–91 FIBA European Cup Winners' Cup was the 25th installment of FIBA's 2nd-tier level European-wide professional club basketball competition FIBA European Cup Winners' Cup (lately called FIBA Saporta Cup), running from September 25, 1990 to March 26, 1991. The trophy was won by PAOK, who defeated CAI Zaragoza by a result of 76–72 at Patinoire des Vernets in Geneva, Switzerland. Overall, PAOK achieved in the present competition a record of 7 wins against 4 defeats, in five successive rounds. More detailed:

==== First round ====
- Bye

==== Top 16 ====
- Tie played on October 23, 1990 and on October 30, 1990.

Team 1	Agg.	Team 2	1st leg	2nd leg
Sunderland Saints (England)	174–193	(Greece) PAOK	89–96	85–97

==== Quarterfinals ====
- Day 1 (December 11, 1990)

Team 1	Score	Team 2
CAI Zaragoza (Spain)	70–64	(Greece) PAOK

- Day 2 (December 18, 1990)

Team 1	Score	Team 2
PAOK (Greece)	91–80	(Socialist Federal Republic of Yugoslavia) Crvena zvezda

- Day 3 (January 8, 1991)

Team 1	Score	Team 2
PAOK (Greece)	107–77	(Israel) Hapoel Galil Elyon

- Day 4 (January 15, 1991)

Team 1	Score	Team 2
PAOK (Greece)	112–102	(Spain) CAI Zaragoza

- Day 5 (January 22, 1991)

Team 1	Score	Team 2
Crvena zvezda (Socialist Federal Republic of Yugoslavia)	91–75	(Greece) PAOK

- Day 6 (January 29, 1991)

Team 1	Score	Team 2
Hapoel Galil Elyon (Israel)	80–79	(Greece) PAOK

- Group B standings:

Pos.	Team	Pld.	Pts.	W	L	PF	PA	PD	Tie-break
1.	(Spain) CAI Zaragoza	6	10	4	2	593	571	+22	
2.	(Greece) PAOK	6	9	3	3	528	500	+28	1–1 (+29)
3.	(Israel) Hapoel Galil Elyon	6	9	3	3	546	560	-14	1–1 (-29)
4.	(Socialist Federal Republic of Yugoslavia) Crvena zvezda	6	8	2	4	593	629	-36	

==== Semifinals ====
- Tie played on February 12, 1991 and on February 26, 1991.

Team 1	Agg.	Team 2	1st leg	2nd leg
PAOK (Greece)	158–157	(Soviet Union) Dynamo Moscow	95–82	63–75

==== Final ====
- March 26, 1991 at Patinoire des Vernets in Geneva, Switzerland.

Team 1	Score	Team 2
PAOK (Greece)	76–72	(Spain) CAI Zaragoza

=== 1991–92 FIBA European Cup, 2nd–tier ===
The 1991–92 FIBA European Cup was the 26th installment of FIBA's 2nd-tier level European-wide professional club basketball competition FIBA European Cup (lately called FIBA Saporta Cup), running from September 10, 1991 to March 17, 1992. The trophy was won by Real Madrid Asegurator, who defeated the title holder PAOK by a result of 65–63 at Palais des Sports de Beaulieu in Nantes, France. Overall, PAOK achieved in the present competition a record of 13 wins against 3 defeats, in six successive rounds. More detailed:

==== First round ====
- Bye

==== Second round ====
- Tie played on October 1, 1991 and on October 8, 1991.

Team 1	Agg.	Team 2	1st leg	2nd leg
APOEL (Cyprus)	107–217	(Greece) PAOK	53–111	54–106

==== Third round ====
- Bye

==== Top 12 ====
- Day 1 (November 26, 1991)

Team 1	Score	Team 2
Maccabi Rishon LeZion (Israel)	92–97	(Greece) PAOK

- Day 2 (December 3, 1991)

Team 1	Score	Team 2
PAOK (Greece)	71–73	(Italy) Glaxo Verona

- Day 3 (December 11, 1991)

Team 1	Score	Team 2
Limoges CSP (France)	79–81	(Greece) PAOK

- Day 4 (December 17, 1991)

Team 1	Score	Team 2
PAOK (Greece)	81–70	(Belgium) Sunair Oostende

- Day 5 (January 7, 1992)

Team 1	Score	Team 2
PAOK (Greece)	83–79	(Germany) Alba Berlin

- Day 6 (January 14, 1992)

Team 1	Score	Team 2
PAOK (Greece)	95–80	(Israel) Maccabi Rishon LeZion

- Day 7 (January 21, 1992)

Team 1	Score	Team 2
Glaxo Verona (Italy)	75–76	(Greece) PAOK

- Day 8 (January 28, 1992)

Team 1	Score	Team 2
PAOK (Greece)	79–68	(France) Limoges CSP

- Day 9 (February 4, 1992)

Team 1	Score	Team 2
Sunair Oostende (Belgium)	81–87	(Greece) PAOK

- Day 10 (February 11, 1992)

Team 1	Score	Team 2
Alba Berlin (Germany)	65–79	(Greece) PAOK

- Group A standings:

Pos.	Team	Pld.	Pts.	W	L	PF	PA	PD	Tie-break
1.	(Greece) PAOK	10	19	9	1	829	762	+67	
2.	(Italy) Glaxo Verona	10	18	8	2	862	818	+44	
3.	(France) Limoges CSP	10	14	4	6	855	841	+14	1–1 (+7)
4.	(Belgium) Sunair Oostende	10	14	4	6	935	903	+32	1–1 (-7)
5.	(Israel) Maccabi Rishon LeZion	10	13	3	7	891	959	-68	
6.	(Germany) Alba Berlin	10	12	2	8	758	847	-89	

==== Semifinals ====
- Best-of-3 playoff: Game 1 away on February 20, 1992 / Game 2 at home on February 25, 1992 / Game 3 at home on February 27, 1992.

Team 1	Agg.	Team 2	1st leg	2nd leg	3rd leg
Smelt Olimpija (Slovenia)	1–2	(Greece) PAOK	81–68	61–79	86–104

==== Final ====
- March 17, 1992 at Palais des Sports de Beaulieu in Nantes, France

Team 1	Score	Team 2
Real Madrid Asegurator (Spain)	65–63	(Greece) PAOK

=== 1992–93 FIBA European League, 1st–tier ===
The 1992–93 FIBA European League was the 36th installment of the European top-tier level professional club competition for basketball clubs (now called EuroLeague), running from September 10, 1992 to April 15, 1993. The trophy was won by Limoges CSP, who defeated Benetton Treviso by a result of 59–55 at Peace and Friendship Stadium in Piraeus, Greece. Overall, PAOK achieved in present competition a record of 15 wins against 5 defeats, in six successive rounds. More detailed:

==== First round ====
- Tie played on September 10, 1992 and on September 17, 1992.

Team 1	Agg.	Team 2	1st leg	2nd leg
Pezoporikos Larnaca (Cyprus)	130–211	(Greece) PAOK	61–104	69–107

==== Second round ====
- Tie played on October 1, 1992 and on October 8, 1992.

Team 1	Agg.	Team 2	1st leg	2nd leg
Crvena zvezda (Federal Republic of Yugoslavia)	0–4*	(Greece) PAOK	0–2	0–2

^{*}Crvena zvezda was drawn for the competition but was not allowed to compete due to United Nations embargo on FR Yugoslavia. So PAOK went through with a walkover.

==== Top 16 ====
- Day 1 (October 29, 1992)

Team 1	Score	Team 2
Scavolini Pesaro (Italy)	80–70	(Greece) PAOK

- Day 2 (November 5, 1992)

Team 1	Score	Team 2
PAOK (Greece)	67–57	(France) Limoges CSP

- Day 3 (November 26, 1992)

Bye: Partizan was the title holder but was not allowed to compete due to United Nations embargo on FR Yugoslavia.

- Day 4 (December 3, 1992)

Team 1	Score	Team 2
Maccabi Elite Tel Aviv (Israel)	85–81	(Greece) PAOK

- Day 5 (December 10, 1992)

Team 1	Score	Team 2
Knorr Bologna (Italy)	64–75	(Greece) PAOK

- Day 6 (December 17, 1992)

Team 1	Score	Team 2
PAOK (Greece)	83–81	(Spain) Marbella Joventut

- Day 7 (January 6, 1993)

Team 1	Score	Team 2
Cibona (Croatia)	71–82	(Greece) PAOK

- Day 8 (January 14, 1993)

Team 1	Score	Team 2
PAOK (Greece)	69–65*	(Italy) Scavolini Pesaro

^{*}Two Overtimes at the end of regulation (52–52 and 57–57).

- Day 9 (January 20, 1993)

Team 1	Score	Team 2
Limoges CSP (France)	60–58	(Greece) PAOK

- Day 10 (January 28, 1993)

Bye: Partizan was the title holder but was not allowed to compete due to United Nations embargo on FR Yugoslavia.

- Day 11 (February 4, 1993)

Team 1	Score	Team 2
PAOK (Greece)	78–63	(Israel) Maccabi Elite Tel Aviv

- Day 12 (February 11, 1993)

Team 1	Score	Team 2
PAOK (Greece)	64–62	(Italy) Knorr Bologna

- Day 13 (February 17, 1993)

Team 1	Score	Team 2
Marbella Joventut (Spain)	84–71	(Greece) PAOK

- Day 14 (February 25, 1993)

Team 1	Score	Team 2
PAOK (Greece)	81–67	(Croatia) Cibona

- Group A standings:

Pos.	Team	Pld.	Pts.	W	L	PF	PA	PD	Tie-break
1.	(Greece) PAOK	12	20	8	4	879	839	+40	
2.	(France) Limoges CSP	12	19	7	5	816	757	+59	2–0
3.	(Italy) Scavolini Pesaro	12	19	7	5	887	877	+10	0–2
4.	(Italy) Knorr Bologna	12	18	6	6	938	893	+45	1–1 (+2)
5.	(Spain) Marbella Joventut	12	18	6	6	945	946	-1	1–1 (-2)
6.	(Croatia) Cibona	12	17	5	7	909	976	-67	
7.	(Israel) Maccabi Elite Tel Aviv	12	15	3	9	934	1020	-86	
8.	(Federal Republic of Yugoslavia) Partizan	0	0	0	0	0	0	0	

==== Quarterfinals ====
- Best-of-3 playoff: Game 1 away on March 11, 1993 / Game 2 at home on March 16, 1993.

Team 1	Agg.	Team 2	1st leg	2nd leg	3rd leg
Pau-Orthez (France)	0–2	(Greece) PAOK	86–103	65–81	– – –

==== Final four ====
The 1993 FIBA European League Final Four, was the 1992–93 season's FIBA European League Final Four tournament, organized by FIBA Europe.

- Semifinals: April 13, 1993 at Peace and Friendship Stadium in Piraeus, Greece.

Team 1	Score	Team 2
PAOK (Greece)	77–79	(Italy) Benetton Treviso

- 3rd place game: April 15, 1993 at Peace and Friendship Stadium in Piraeus, Greece.

Team 1	Score	Team 2
Real Madrid Teka (Spain)	70–76	(Greece) PAOK

- Final four standings:

Pos.	Team	Rec.
	(France) Limoges CSP	2–0
Silver medal	(Italy) Benetton Treviso	1–1
Bronze medal	(Greece) PAOK	1–1
4th	(Spain) Real Madrid Teka	0–2

=== 1993–94 FIBA Korać Cup, 3rd–tier ===
The 1993–94 FIBA Korać Cup was the 23rd installment of the European 3rd-tier level professional basketball club competition FIBA Korać Cup, running from September 8, 1993 to March 16, 1994. The trophy was won by PAOK Bravo, who defeated Stefanel Trieste by a result of 175–157 in a two-legged final on a home and away basis. Overall, PAOK Bravo achieved in present competition a record of 12 wins against 2 defeats, in seven successive rounds. More detailed:

==== First round ====
- Bye

==== Second round ====
- Bye

==== Third round ====
- Tie played on October 27, 1993 and on November 3, 1993.

Team 1	Agg.	Team 2	1st leg	2nd leg
Stroitel Samara (Russia)	133–182	(Greece) PAOK Bravo	77–81	56–101

==== Top 16 ====
- Day 1 (November 24, 1993)

Team 1	Score	Team 2
Caja San Fernando (Spain)	82–87	(Greece) PAOK Bravo

- Day 2 (November 30, 1993)

Team 1	Score	Team 2
Recoaro Milano (Italy)	76–74	(Greece) PAOK Bravo

- Day 3 (December 8, 1993)

Team 1	Score	Team 2
PAOK Bravo (Greece)	84–70	(Croatia) Zagreb

- Day 4 (December 15, 1993)

Team 1	Score	Team 2
PAOK Bravo (Greece)	92–89	(Spain) Caja San Fernando

- Day 5 (January 5, 1994)

Team 1	Score	Team 2
PAOK Bravo (Greece)	71–67	(Italy) Recoaro Milano

- Day 6 (January 12, 1994)

Team 1	Score	Team 2
Zagreb (Croatia)	77–91	(Greece) PAOK Bravo

- Group C standings:

Pos.	Team	Pld.	Pts.	W	L	PF	PA	PD
1.	(Greece) PAOK Bravo	6	11	5	1	499	461	+38
2.	(Italy) Recoaro Milano	6	10	4	2	519	459	+60
3.	(Croatia) Zagreb	6	9	3	3	460	510	-50
4.	(Spain) Caja San Fernando	6	6	0	6	502	550	-48

==== Quarterfinals ====
- Tie played on January 26, 1994 and on February 2, 1994.

Team 1	Agg.	Team 2	1st leg	2nd leg
Scavolini Pesaro (Italy)	140–162	(Greece) PAOK Bravo	82–66	58–96

==== Semifinals ====
- Tie played on February 16, 1994 and on February 23, 1994.

Team 1	Agg.	Team 2	1st leg	2nd leg
Chipita Panionios (Greece)	147–167	(Greece) PAOK Bravo	83–85	64–82

==== Finals ====
- Tie played on March 9, 1994 at Alexandreio Melathron in Thessaloniki, Greece and on March 16, 1994 at Palazzo dello sport Cesare Rubini in Trieste, Italy.

Team 1	Agg.	Team 2	1st leg	2nd leg
PAOK Bravo (Greece)	175–157	(Italy) Stefanel Trieste	75–66	100–91

=== 1994–95 FIBA European League, 1st–tier ===
The 1994–95 FIBA European League was the 38th installment of the European top-tier level professional club competition for basketball clubs (now called EuroLeague), running from September 8, 1994 to April 13, 1995. The trophy was won by Real Madrid Teka, who defeated Olympiacos by a result of 73–61 at Pabellón Príncipe Felipe in Zaragoza, Spain. Overall, PAOK Bravo achieved in present competition a record of 7 wins against 9 defeats, in three successive rounds. More detailed:

==== First round ====
- Bye

==== Second round ====
- Tie played on September 29, 1994 and on October 6, 1994.

Team 1	Agg.	Team 2	1st leg	2nd leg
Hapoel Tel Aviv (Israel)	148–152	(Greece) PAOK Bravo	82–70	66–82

==== Top 16 ====
- Day 1 (October 27, 1994)

Team 1	Score	Team 2
Maccabi Elite Tel Aviv (Israel)	75–84	(Greece) PAOK Bravo

- Day 2 (November 2, 1994)

Team 1	Score	Team 2
PAOK Bravo (Greece)	80–81	(Russia) CSKA Moscow

- Day 3 (November 23, 1994)

Team 1	Score	Team 2
PAOK Bravo (Greece)	74–68	(Portugal) Benfica

- Day 4 (November 30, 1994)

Team 1	Score	Team 2
Smelt Olimpija (Slovenia)	87–81	(Greece) PAOK Bravo

- Day 5 (December 8, 1994)

Team 1	Score	Team 2
Panathinaikos (Greece)	72–63	(Greece) PAOK Bravo

- Day 6 (December 14, 1994)

Team 1	Score	Team 2
PAOK Bravo (Greece)	57–73	(Spain) Real Madrid Teka

- Day 7 (January 4, 1995)

Team 1	Score	Team 2
Scavolini Pesaro (Italy)	82–70	(Greece) PAOK Bravo

- Day 8 (January 12, 1995)

Team 1	Score	Team 2
PAOK Bravo (Greece)	79–62	(Israel) Maccabi Elite Tel Aviv

- Day 9 (January 18, 1995)

Team 1	Score	Team 2
CSKA Moscow (Russia)	85–73	(Greece) PAOK Bravo

- Day 10 (January 26, 1995)

Team 1	Score	Team 2
Benfica (Portugal)	77–75	(Greece) PAOK Bravo

- Day 11 (February 1, 1995)

Team 1	Score	Team 2
PAOK Bravo (Greece)	85–66	(Slovenia) Smelt Olimpija

- Day 12 (February 8, 1995)

Team 1	Score	Team 2
PAOK Bravo (Greece)	80–70	(Greece) Panathinaikos

- Day 13 (February 16, 1995)

Team 1	Score	Team 2
Real Madrid Teka (Spain)	69–52	(Greece) PAOK Bravo

- Day 14 (February 22, 1995)

Team 1	Score	Team 2
PAOK Bravo (Greece)	84–79	(Italy) Scavolini Pesaro

- Group A standings:

Pos.	Team	Pld.	Pts.	W	L	PF	PA	PD	Tie-break
1.	(Greece) Panathinaikos	14	24	10	4	1059	982	+77	
2.	(Spain) Real Madrid Teka	14	23	9	5	1052	989	+63	2–2 (+14)
3.	(Russia) CSKA Moscow	14	23	9	5	1203	1162	+41	2–2 (+2)
4.	(Italy) Scavolini Pesaro	14	23	9	5	1148	1108	+40	2–2 (-16)
5.	(Israel) Maccabi Elite Tel Aviv	14	22	8	6	1113	1104	+9	
6.	(Greece) PAOK Bravo	14	20	6	8	1037	1046	-9	
7.	(Slovenia) Smelt Olimpija	14	17	3	11	1026	1102	-76	
8.	(Portugal) Benfica	14	16	2	12	970	1115	-145	

=== 1995–96 FIBA European Cup, 2nd–tier ===
The 1995–96 FIBA European Cup was the 30th installment of FIBA's 2nd-tier level European-wide professional club basketball competition FIBA European Cup (lately called FIBA Saporta Cup), running from September 5, 1995 to March 12, 1996. The trophy was won by Taugrés, who defeated PAOK by a result of 88–81 at Pabellón Álava in Vitoria-Gasteiz, Spain. Overall, PAOK achieved in the present competition a record of 15 wins against 4 defeats, in six successive rounds. More detailed:

==== First round ====
- Tie played on September 9, 1995 and on September 12, 1995.

Team 1	Agg.	Team 2	1st leg	2nd leg
PAEEK (Cyprus)	87–225	(Greece) PAOK	40–109	47–116

==== Second round ====
- Tie played on September 26, 1995 and on October 3, 1995.

Team 1	Agg.	Team 2	1st leg	2nd leg
Republika Postojna (Slovenia)	137–189	(Greece) PAOK	71–79	66–110

==== Third round ====
- Tie played on October 24, 1995 and on October 31, 1995.

Team 1	Agg.	Team 2	1st leg	2nd leg
PAOK (Greece)	150–143	(Ukraine) Budivelnyk	76–68	74–75

==== Top 12 ====
- Day 1 (November 21, 1995)

Team 1	Score	Team 2
PAOK (Greece)	86–85*	(Croatia) Zrinjevac

^{*}Overtime at the end of regulation (72–72).

- Day 2 (November 28, 1995)

Team 1	Score	Team 2
PAOK (Greece)	77–67	(Slovenia) Smelt Olimpija

- Day 3 (December 5, 1995)

Team 1	Score	Team 2
Kalev (Estonia)	71–75	(Greece) PAOK

- Day 4 (December 12, 1995)

Team 1	Score	Team 2
Dynamo Moscow (Russia)	65–62	(Greece) PAOK

- Day 5 (December 19, 1995)

Team 1	Score	Team 2
PAOK (Greece)	109–66	(Poland) Nobiles Włocławek

- Day 6 (January 2, 1996)

Team 1	Score	Team 2
Zrinjevac (Croatia)	76–73	(Greece) PAOK

- Day 7 (January 9, 1996)

Team 1	Score	Team 2
Smelt Olimpija (Slovenia)	66–86	(Greece) PAOK

- Day 8 (January 16, 1996)

Team 1	Score	Team 2
PAOK (Greece)	77–63	(Estonia) Kalev

- Day 9 (January 23, 1996)

Team 1	Score	Team 2
PAOK (Greece)	64–59	(Russia) Dynamo Moscow

- Day 10 (January 30, 1996)

Team 1	Score	Team 2
Nobiles Włocławek (Poland)	57–112	(Greece) PAOK

- Group B standings:

Pos.	Team	Pld.	Pts.	W	L	PF	PA	PD	Tie-break
1.	(Greece) PAOK	10	18	8	2	821	675	+46	
2.	(Russia) Dynamo Moscow	10	17	7	3	812	772	+40	
3.	(Croatia) Zrinjevac	10	16	6	4	817	752	+65	
4.	(Estonia) Kalev	10	14	4	6	821	820	+1	
5.	(Poland) Nobiles Włocławek	10	13	3	7	798	956	-158	1–1 (+2)
6.	(Slovenia) Smelt Olimpija	10	13	3	7	765	825	-60	1–1 (-2)

==== Semifinals ====
- Best-of-3 playoff: Game 1 away on February 6, 1996 / Game 2 at home on February 13, 1996.

Team 1	Agg.	Team 2	1st leg	2nd leg	3rd leg
Žalgiris (Lithuania)	0–2	(Greece) PAOK	76–83	59–104	– – –

==== Final ====
- March 12, 1996 at Pabellón Álava in Vitoria-Gasteiz, Spain

Team 1	Score	Team 2
Taugrés (Spain)	88–81	(Greece) PAOK

=== 1996–97 FIBA Korać Cup, 3rd–tier ===
The 1996–97 FIBA Korać Cup was the 26th installment of the European 3rd-tier level professional basketball club competition FIBA Korać Cup, running from September 11, 1996 to April 3, 1997. The trophy was won by Aris, who defeated Tofaş by a result of 154–147 in a two-legged final on a home and away basis. Overall, PAOK achieved in present competition a record of 9 wins against 1 defeat, in four successive rounds. More detailed:

==== First round ====
- Bye

==== Second round ====
- Day 1 (October 2, 1996)

Team 1	Score	Team 2
PAOK (Greece)	93–61	(Turkey) Galatasaray

- Day 2 (October 9, 1996)

Team 1	Score	Team 2
Ovarense (Portugal)	85–99	(Greece) PAOK

- Day 3 (October 15, 1996)

Team 1	Score	Team 2
PAOK (Greece)	120–63	(Sweden) Astra Södertälje

- Day 4 (November 6, 1996)

Team 1	Score	Team 2
Galatasaray (Turkey)	64–90	(Greece) PAOK

- Day 5 (November 12, 1996)

Team 1	Score	Team 2
PAOK (Greece)	97–72	(Portugal) Ovarense

- Day 6 (November 20, 1996)

Team 1	Score	Team 2
Astra Södertälje (Sweden)	79–88	(Greece) PAOK

- Group M standings:

Pos.	Team	Pld.	Pts.	W	L	PF	PA	PD	Tie-break
1.	(Greece) PAOK	6	12	6	0	587	424	+163	
2.	(Portugal) Ovarense	6	9	3	3	489	489	0	1–1 (+23)
3.	(Turkey) Galatasaray	6	9	3	3	422	486	-64	1–1 (-23)
4.	(Sweden) Astra Södertälje	6	6	0	6	451	550	-99	

==== Third round ====
- Tie played on December 4, 1996 and on December 11, 1996.

Team 1	Agg.	Team 2	1st leg	2nd leg
Crvena zvezda (Federal Republic of Yugoslavia)	186–202	(Greece) PAOK	99–102	87–100

==== Top 16 ====
- Tie played on January 15, 1997 and on January 22, 1997.

Team 1	Agg.	Team 2	1st leg	2nd leg
PAOK (Greece)	145–162	(Italy) Benetton Treviso	85–78	60–84

=== 1997–98 FIBA EuroLeague, 1st–tier ===
The 1997–98 FIBA EuroLeague was the 41st installment of the European top-tier level professional club competition for basketball clubs (now called simply EuroLeague), running from September 18, 1997 to April 23, 1998. The trophy was won by Kinder Bologna, who defeated AEK by a result of 58–44 at Palau Sant Jordi in Barcelona, Spain. Overall, PAOK achieved in present competition a record of 10 wins against 9 defeats, in two successive rounds. More detailed:

==== First round ====
- Day 1 (September 18, 1997)

Team 1	Score	Team 2
FC Porto (Portugal)	71–88	(Greece) PAOK

- Day 2 (September 25, 1997)

Team 1	Score	Team 2
Split (Croatia)	74–76	(Greece) PAOK

- Day 3 (October 1, 1997)

Team 1	Score	Team 2
PAOK (Greece)	72–76	(Spain) Estudiantes

- Day 4 (October 9, 1997)

Team 1	Score	Team 2
PAOK (Greece)	65–62	(Italy) Benetton Treviso

- Day 5 (October 22, 1997)

Team 1	Score	Team 2
Türk Telekom PTT (Turkey)	73–66	(Greece) PAOK

- Day 6 (November 6, 1997)

Team 1	Score	Team 2
PAOK (Greece)	84–50	(Portugal) FC Porto

- Day 7 (November 12, 1997)

Team 1	Score	Team 2
PAOK (Greece)	89–60	(Croatia) Split

- Day 8 (November 19, 1997)

Team 1	Score	Team 2
Estudiantes (Spain)	78–60	(Greece) PAOK

- Day 9 (December 11, 1997)

Team 1	Score	Team 2
Benetton Treviso (Italy)	65–57	(Greece) PAOK

- Day 10 (December 17, 1997)

Team 1	Score	Team 2
PAOK (Greece)	72–63	(Turkey) Türk Telekom PTT

- Group B standings:

Pos.	Team	Pld.	Pts.	W	L	PF	PA	PD	Tie-break
1.	(Italy) Benetton Treviso	10	19	9	1	782	664	+118	
2.	(Spain) Estudiantes	10	16	6	4	753	747	+6	2–0
3.	(Greece) PAOK	10	16	6	4	729	672	+57	0–2
4.	(Turkey) Türk Telekom PTT	10	15	5	5	711	716	-5	
5.	(Croatia) Split	10	14	4	6	747	768	-21	
6.	(Portugal) FC Porto	10	10	0	10	688	843	-155	

==== Second round ====
- Day 1 (January 8, 1998)

Team 1	Score	Team 2
CSKA Moscow (Russia)	78–48	(Greece) PAOK

- Day 2 (January 14, 1998)

Team 1	Score	Team 2
PAOK (Greece)	85–76	(France) Limoges CSP

- Day 3 (January 22, 1998)

Team 1	Score	Team 2
Real Madrid Teka (Spain)	63–58	(Greece) PAOK

- Day 4 (February 5, 1998)

Team 1	Score	Team 2
PAOK (Greece)	61–58	(Russia) CSKA Moscow

- Day 5 (February 11, 1998)

Team 1	Score	Team 2
Limoges CSP (France)	77–75*	(Greece) PAOK

^{*}Overtime at the end of regulation (64–64).

- Day 6 (February 18, 1998)

Team 1	Score	Team 2
PAOK (Greece)	63–59	(Spain) Real Madrid Teka

- Group F standings:

Pos.	Team	Pld.	Pts.	W	L	PF	PA	PD	Tie-break
1.	(Italy) Benetton Treviso	16	28	12	4	1213	1100	+113	
2.	(Russia) CSKA Moscow	16	25	9	7	1217	1159	+58	1–1 (+27)
3.	(Greece) PAOK	16	25	9	7	1119	1083	+36	1–1 (-27)
4.	(Spain) Estudiantes	16	24	8	8	1171	1191	-20	
5.	(Spain) Real Madrid Teka	16	23	7	9	1187	1165	+22	
6.	(France) Limoges CSP	16	22	6	10	1099	1199	-100	

==== Top 16 ====
- Best-of-3 playoff: Game 1 away on March 3, 1998 / Game 2 at home on March 5, 1998 / Game 3 away on March 12, 1998.

Team 1	Agg.	Team 2	1st leg	2nd leg	3rd leg
Alba Berlin (Germany)	2–1	(Greece) PAOK	77–75*	60–81	104–71

^{*}Overtime at the end of regulation (69–69).

=== 1998–99 FIBA EuroLeague, 1st–tier ===
The 1998–99 FIBA EuroLeague was the 42nd installment of the European top-tier level professional club competition for basketball clubs (now called simply EuroLeague), running from September 24, 1998 to April 22, 1999. The trophy was won by Žalgiris, who defeated the title holder Kinder Bologna by a result of 82–74 at Olympiahalle in Munich, Germany. Overall, PAOK achieved in present competition a record of 7 wins against 9 defeats, in two successive rounds. More detailed:

==== First round ====
- Day 1 (September 23, 1998)

Team 1	Score	Team 2
PAOK (Greece)	87–75	(Spain) Real Madrid Teka

- Day 2 (September 30, 1998)

Team 1	Score	Team 2
ASVEL (France)	80–66	(Greece) PAOK

- Day 3 (October 7, 1998)

Team 1	Score	Team 2
PAOK (Greece)	76–68	(Slovenia) Union Olimpija

- Day 4 (October 14, 1998)

Team 1	Score	Team 2
Teamsystem Bologna (Italy)	76–61	(Greece) PAOK

- Day 5 (October 22, 1998)

Team 1	Score	Team 2
PAOK (Greece)	85–66	(Russia) CSK VVS Samara

- Day 6 (November 5, 1998)

Team 1	Score	Team 2
Real Madrid Teka (Spain)	77–69	(Greece) PAOK

- Day 7 (November 11, 1998)

Team 1	Score	Team 2
PAOK (Greece)	65–69	(France) ASVEL

- Day 8 (November 19, 1998)

Team 1	Score	Team 2
Union Olimpija (Slovenia)	84–68	(Greece) PAOK

- Day 9 (December 9, 1998)

Team 1	Score	Team 2
PAOK (Greece)	68–59	(Italy) Teamsystem Bologna

- Day 10 (December 17, 1998)

Team 1	Score	Team 2
CSK VVS Samara (Russia)	84–77	(Greece) PAOK

- Group D standings:

Pos.	Team	Pld.	Pts.	W	L	PF	PA	PD	Tie-break
1.	(Slovenia) Union Olimpija	10	17	7	3	702	649	+53	1–1 (+1)
2.	(France) ASVEL	10	17	7	3	729	700	+29	1–1 (-1)
3.	(Spain) Real Madrid Teka	10	16	6	4	795	742	+53	
4.	(Italy) Teamsystem Bologna	10	15	5	5	676	639	+37	
5.	(Greece) PAOK	10	14	4	6	722	738	-16	
6.	(Russia) CSK VVS Samara	10	11	1	9	685	841	-156	

==== Second round ====
- Day 1 (January 7, 1999)

Team 1	Score	Team 2
PAOK (Greece)	71–57	(Italy) Kinder Bologna

- Day 2 (January 13, 1999)

Team 1	Score	Team 2
Olympiacos (Greece)	57–71	(Greece) PAOK

- Day 3 (January 20, 1999)

Team 1	Score	Team 2
PAOK (Greece)	69–71	(Russia) CSKA Moscow

- Day 4 (February 4, 1999)

Team 1	Score	Team 2
Kinder Bologna (Italy)	78–56	(Greece) PAOK

- Day 5 (February 10, 1999)

Team 1	Score	Team 2
PAOK (Greece)	72–66	(Greece) Olympiacos

- Day 6 (February 17, 1999)

Team 1	Score	Team 2
CSKA Moscow (Russia)	77–67	(Greece) PAOK

- Group G standings:

Pos.	Team	Pld.	Pts.	W	L	PF	PA	PD	Tie-break
1.	(Greece) Olympiacos	16	27	11	5	1160	1086	+74	
2.	(Italy) Kinder Bologna	16	26	10	6	1099	974	+125	2–0
3.	(Russia) CSKA Moscow	16	26	10	6	1206	1155	+51	0–2
4.	(Italy) Teamsystem Bologna	16	25	9	7	1100	1039	+61	
5.	(Greece) PAOK	16	23	7	9	1128	1144	-16	
6.	(Russia) CSK VVS Samara	16	17	1	15	1067	1326	-259	

== 2000s ==
=== 1999–2000 FIBA EuroLeague, 1st–tier ===
The 1999–2000 FIBA EuroLeague was the 43rd installment of the European top-tier level professional club competition for basketball clubs (now called simply EuroLeague), running from September 23, 1999 to April 20, 2000. The trophy was won by Panathinaikos, who defeated Maccabi Elite Tel Aviv by a result of 73–67 at PAOK Sports Arena in Thessaloniki, Greece. Overall, PAOK achieved in present competition a record of 8 wins against 11 defeats, in three successive rounds. More detailed:

==== First round ====
- Day 1 (September 23, 1999)

Team 1	Score	Team 2
Crvena zvezda (Federal Republic of Yugoslavia)	65–64	(Greece) PAOK

- Day 2 (September 29, 1999)

Team 1	Score	Team 2
PAOK (Greece)	83–76	(France) Cholet Basket

- Day 3 (September 6, 1999)

Team 1	Score	Team 2
PAOK (Greece)	83–63	(Russia) CSKA Moscow

- Day 4 (October 20, 1999)

Team 1	Score	Team 2
Benetton Treviso (Italy)	69–66	(Greece) PAOK

- Day 5 (October 28, 1999)

Team 1	Score	Team 2
FC Barcelona (Spain)	76–55	(Greece) PAOK

- Day 6 (November 4, 1999)

Team 1	Score	Team 2
PAOK (Greece)	82–53	(Federal Republic of Yugoslavia) Crvena zvezda

- Day 7 (November 10, 1999)

Team 1	Score	Team 2
Cholet Basket (France)	48–66	(Greece) PAOK

- Day 8 (November 17, 1999)

Team 1	Score	Team 2
CSKA Moscow (Russia)	71–82	(Greece) PAOK

- Day 9 (December 8, 1999)

Team 1	Score	Team 2
PAOK (Greece)	66–72	(Italy) Benetton Treviso

- Day 10 (December 15, 1999)

Team 1	Score	Team 2
PAOK (Greece)	83–87	(Spain) FC Barcelona

- Group A standings:

Pos.	Team	Pld.	Pts.	W	L	PF	PA	PD
1.	(Spain) FC Barcelona	10	19	9	1	780	685	+95
2.	(Russia) CSKA Moscow	10	17	7	3	754	705	+49
3.	(Italy) Benetton Treviso	10	16	6	4	700	675	+25
4.	(Greece) PAOK	10	15	5	5	730	680	+50
5.	(France) Cholet Basket	10	12	2	8	640	711	-71
6.	(Federal Republic of Yugoslavia) Crvena zvezda	10	11	1	9	636	784	-148

==== Second round ====
- Day 1 (January 6, 2000)

Team 1	Score	Team 2
PAOK (Greece)	72–71	(Spain) Real Madrid Teka

- Day 2 (January 13, 2000)

Team 1	Score	Team 2
Union Olimpija (Slovenia)	69–63	(Greece) PAOK

- Day 3 (January 19, 2000)

Team 1	Score	Team 2
PAOK (Greece)	69–77	(Greece) Panathinaikos

- Day 4 (February 3, 2000)

Team 1	Score	Team 2
Real Madrid Teka (Spain)	72–61	(Greece) PAOK

- Day 5 (February 9, 2000)

Team 1	Score	Team 2
PAOK (Greece)	70–74	(Slovenia) Union Olimpija

- Day 6 (February 17, 2000)

Team 1	Score	Team 2
Panathinaikos (Greece)	71–75	(Greece) PAOK

- Group F standings:

Pos.	Team	Pld.	Pts.	W	L	PF	PA	PD	Tie-break
1.	(Greece) Panathinaikos	16	29	13	3	1246	1084	+162	
2.	(Slovenia) Union Olimpija	16	26	10	6	1201	1175	+26	1–1 (+8)
3.	(Spain) Real Madrid Teka	16	26	10	6	1227	1187	+40	1–1 (-8)
4.	(Greece) PAOK	16	23	7	9	1140	1114	+26	
5.	(France) Cholet Basket	16	19	3	13	1054	1186	-132	
6.	(Federal Republic of Yugoslavia) Crvena zvezda	16	17	1	15	1034	1257	-223	

==== Top 16 ====
- Best-of-3 playoff: Game 1 away on February 29, 2000 / Game 2 at home on March 2, 2000 / Game 3 away on March 9, 2000.

Team 1	Agg.	Team 2	1st leg	2nd leg	3rd leg
Maccabi Elite Tel Aviv (Israel)	2–1	(Greece) PAOK	77–62	55–67	78–62

=== 2000–01 Euroleague, 1st–tier ===
The 2000–01 Euroleague was the inaugural season of the EuroLeague, under the newly formed Euroleague Basketball Company's authority, and it was the 44th installment of the European top-tier level professional club competition for basketball clubs, running from October 19, 2000 to May 10, 2001. The trophy was won by Kinder Bologna, who defeated Tau Cerámica in a Best-of-5 playoff final series by a result of 3–2. Overall, PAOK achieved in present competition a record of 8 wins against 5 defeats, in two successive rounds. More detailed:

==== Regular season ====
- Day 1 (October 18, 2000)

Team 1	Score	Team 2
PAOK (Greece)	97–94*	(Italy) Müller Verona

^{*}Overtime at the end of regulation (76–76).

- Day 2 (October 25, 2000)

Team 1	Score	Team 2
FC Barcelona (Spain)	58–67	(Greece) PAOK

- Day 3 (November 1, 2000)

Team 1	Score	Team 2
PAOK (Greece)	100–70	(Germany) Opel Skyliners

- Day 4 (November 8, 2000)

Team 1	Score	Team 2
Budućnost (Federal Republic of Yugoslavia)	83–71	(Greece) PAOK

- Day 5 (November 15, 2000)

Team 1	Score	Team 2
PAOK (Greece)	70–58	(United Kingdom) London Towers

- Day 6 (December 6, 2000)

Team 1	Score	Team 2
Müller Verona (Italy)	102–88	(Greece) PAOK

- Day 7 (December 13, 2000)

Team 1	Score	Team 2
PAOK (Greece)	91–102	(Spain) FC Barcelona

- Day 8 (December 20, 2000)

Team 1	Score	Team 2
Opel Skyliners (Germany)	73–80	(Greece) PAOK

- Day 9 (January 10, 2001)

Team 1	Score	Team 2
PAOK (Greece)	89–72	(Federal Republic of Yugoslavia) Budućnost

- Day 10 (January 18, 2001)

Team 1	Score	Team 2
London Towers (United Kingdom)	61–93	(Greece) PAOK

- Group D standings:

Pos.	Team	Pld.	W	L	PF	PA	PD	Tie-break
1.	(Spain) FC Barcelona	10	8	2	856	757	+99	
2.	(Greece) PAOK	10	7	3	846	773	+73	1–1 (+5)
3.	(Federal Republic of Yugoslavia) Budućnost	10	7	3	844	819	+25	1–1 (-5)
4.	(Italy) Müller Verona	10	6	4	920	854	+66	
5.	(United Kingdom) London Towers	10	1	9	775	878	-103	1–1 (+22)
6.	(Germany) Opel Skyliners	10	1	9	696	856	-160	1–1 (-22)

==== Top 16 ====
- Best-of-3 playoff: Game 1 at home on February 1, 2001 / Game 2 away on February 8, 2001 / Game 3 at home on February 14, 2001.

Team 1	Agg.	Team 2	1st leg	2nd leg	3rd leg
PAOK (Greece)	1–2	(Slovenia) Union Olimpija	75–64	77–85	69–73

=== 2001–02 FIBA Korać Cup, 3rd–tier ===
The 2001–02 FIBA Korać Cup was the 31st installment of the European 3rd-tier level professional basketball club competition FIBA Korać Cup, running from September 26, 2001 to April 17, 2002. The trophy was won by SLUC Nancy, who defeated Lokomotiv Mineralnye Vody by a result of 172–167 in a two-legged final on a home and away basis. Overall, PAOK achieved in present competition a record of 5 wins against 3 defeats, in two successive rounds. More detailed:

==== First round ====
- Bye

==== Second round ====
- Tie played on October 16, 2001 and on October 23, 2001.

Team 1	Agg.	Team 2	1st leg	2nd leg
Apollon Limassol (Cyprus)	136–164	(Greece) PAOK	65–69	71–95

==== Third round ====
- Day 1 (November 14, 2001)

Team 1	Score	Team 2
Maccabi Ironi Ramat Gan (Israel)	81–71	(Greece) PAOK

- Day 2 (December 5, 2001)

Team 1	Score	Team 2
PAOK (Greece)	63–82	(Russia) Lokomotiv Mineralnye Vody

- Day 3 (December 12, 2001)

Team 1	Score	Team 2
AEL (Cyprus)	90–92	(Greece) PAOK

- Day 4 (December 19, 2001)

Team 1	Score	Team 2
PAOK (Greece)	72–44	(Israel) Maccabi Ironi Ramat Gan

- Day 5 (January 9, 2002)

Team 1	Score	Team 2
Lokomotiv Mineralnye Vody (Russia)	85–64	(Greece) PAOK

- Day 6 (January 16, 2002)

Team 1	Score	Team 2
PAOK (Greece)	102–62	(Cyprus) AEL

- Group E standings:

Pos.	Team	Pld.	Pts.	W	L	PF	PA	PD
1	(Russia) Lokomotiv Mineralnye Vody	6	11	5	1	549	438	+111
2	(Israel) Maccabi Ironi Ramat Gan	6	10	4	2	468	474	-6
3	(Greece) PAOK	6	9	3	3	464	444	+20
4	(Cyprus) AEL	6	6	0	6	475	600	-125

=== 2002–03 FIBA Europe Champions Cup, 4th–tier ===
The 2002–03 FIBA Europe Champions Cup was the 1st installment of FIBA's 4th-tier level European-wide professional club basketball competition FIBA Europe Champions Cup (lately called FIBA EuroCup Challenge), running from October 1, 2002 to May 4, 2003. The trophy was won by Aris, who defeated Prokom Trefl Sopot by a result of 84–83 at Alexandreio Melathron in Thessaloniki, Greece. Overall, PAOK achieved in the present competition a record of 9 wins against 7 defeats, in two successive rounds. More detailed:

==== Regular season ====
- Day 1 (October 2, 2002)

Team 1	Score	Team 2
PAOK (Greece)	94–79	(Slovenia) Geoplin Slovan

- Day 2 (October 8, 2002)

Team 1	Score	Team 2
Feal Široki (Bosnia and Herzegovina)	84–80	(Greece) PAOK

- Day 3 (October 16, 2002)

Team 1	Score	Team 2
Lukoil Academic (Bulgaria)	103–78	(Greece) PAOK

- Day 4 (October 23, 2002)

Team 1	Score	Team 2
PAOK (Greece)	78–60	(Cyprus) APOEL

- Day 5 (October 29, 2002)

Team 1	Score	Team 2
Zagreb (Croatia)	80–95	(Greece) PAOK

- Day 6 (November 5, 2002)

Team 1	Score	Team 2
Geoplin Slovan (Slovenia)	81–88	(Greece) PAOK

- Day 7 (November 12, 2002)

Team 1	Score	Team 2
PAOK (Greece)	89–73	(Bosnia and Herzegovina) Feal Široki

- Day 8 (December 4, 2002)

Team 1	Score	Team 2
PAOK (Greece)	74–72	(Bulgaria) Lukoil Academic

- Day 9 (December 10, 2002)

Team 1	Score	Team 2
APOEL (Cyprus)	58–104	(Greece) PAOK

- Day 10 (December 18, 2002)

Team 1	Score	Team 2
PAOK (Greece)	78–88	(Croatia) Zagreb

- Group D standings:

Pos.	Team	Pld.	W	L	PF	PA	PD	Tie-break
1.	(Bulgaria) Lukoil Academic	10	8	2	878	720	+158	
2.	(Greece) PAOK	10	7	3	858	778	+80	
3.	(Slovenia) Geoplin Slovan	10	6	4	753	705	+48	
4.	(Croatia) Zagreb	10	4	6	783	790	-7	1–1 (+9)
5.	(Bosnia and Herzegovina) Feal Široki	10	4	6	772	848	-76	1–1 (-9)
6.	(Cyprus) APOEL	10	1	9	644	847	-203	

==== Pan-European phase (Top 23) ====
- Day 1 (February 4, 2003)

Team 1	Score	Team 2
Hemofarm (Serbia and Montenegro)	84–68	(Greece) PAOK

- Day 2 (February 11, 2003)

Team 1	Score	Team 2
PAOK (Greece)	71–73	(Lithuania) Lietuvos rytas

- Day 3 (February 25, 2003)

Team 1	Score	Team 2
Skonto (Latvia)	107–76	(Greece) PAOK

- Day 4 (March 4, 2003)

Team 1	Score	Team 2
PAOK (Greece)	86–78	(Serbia and Montenegro) Hemofarm

- Day 5 (March 18, 2003)

Team 1	Score	Team 2
Lietuvos rytas (Lithuania)	109–79	(Greece) PAOK

- Day 6 (March 26, 2003)

Team 1	Score	Team 2
PAOK (Greece)	90–84	(Latvia) Skonto

- Group B standings:

Pos.	Team	Pld.	W	L	PF	PA	PD	Tie-break
1.	(Serbia and Montenegro) Hemofarm	6	5	1	533	457	+76	
2.	(Lithuania) Lietuvos rytas	6	3	3	494	468	+26	
3.	(Latvia) Skonto	6	2	4	530	567	-37	1–1 (+25)
4.	(Greece) PAOK	6	2	4	470	535	-65	1–1 (-25)

=== 2003–04 FIBA Europe League, 3rd–tier ===
The 2003–04 FIBA Europe League was the 1st installment of FIBA's 3rd-tier level European-wide professional club basketball competition FIBA Europe League (lately called FIBA Europe Cup), running from October 15, 2003 to April 24, 2004. The trophy was won by UNICS, who defeated TIM Maroussi by a result of 87–63 at Basket-Hall Kazan in Kazan, Russia. Overall, PAOK achieved in the present competition a record of 5 wins against 2 defeats, in only one round. More detailed:

==== Regular season ====
- Day 1 (October 14, 2003)

Team 1	Score	Team 2
Široki Hercegtisak (Bosnia and Herzegovina)	78–96	(Greece) PAOK

- Day 2 (October 22, 2003)

Team 1	Score	Team 2
PAOK (Greece)	85–65	(Ukraine) Azovmash

- Day 3 (October 28, 2003)

Team 1	Score	Team 2
Telindus Oostende (Belgium)	79–101	(Greece) PAOK

- Day 4 (November 5, 2003)

Team 1	Score	Team 2
PAOK (Greece)	78–91	(Russia) UNICS

- Day 5 (November 12, 2003)

Team 1	Score	Team 2
PAOK (Greece)	93–81	(Lithuania) Alytus Alita

- Day 6 (November 18, 2003)

Team 1	Score	Team 2
STB Le Havre (France)	92–100*	(Greece) PAOK

^{*}Overtime at the end of regulation (83–83).

- Day 7 (November 26, 2003)

Team 1	Score	Team 2
Türk Telekom (Turkey)	20–0#	(Greece) PAOK

^{#}PAOK refused to travel to Ankara to play their competition day 7 game and withdrew from the tournament. Later, FIBA Europe declared all their previous and future games null and void.

=== 2004–05 ULEB Cup, 2nd–tier ===
The 2004–05 ULEB Cup was the 3rd installment of ULEB's 2nd-tier level European-wide professional club basketball competition ULEB Cup (lately called EuroCup Basketball), running from November 9, 2004 to April 19, 2005. The trophy was won by Lietuvos rytas, who defeated Makedonikos by a result of 78–74 at Spiroudome in Charleroi, Belgium. Overall, PAOK achieved in the present competition a record of 11 wins against 3 defeats, in three successive rounds. More detailed:

==== Regular season ====
- Day 1 (November 9, 2004)

Team 1	Score	Team 2
Debreceni Vadkakasok (Hungary)	69–77	(Greece) PAOK

- Day 2 (November 16, 2004)

Team 1	Score	Team 2
BCM Gravelines-Dunkerque (France)	70–83	(Greece) PAOK

- Day 3 (November 23, 2004)

Team 1	Score	Team 2
PAOK (Greece)	80–73	(Belgium) Spirou Charleroi

- Day 4 (November 30, 2004)

Team 1	Score	Team 2
PAOK (Greece)	88–94*	(Germany) Alba Berlin

^{*}Overtime at the end of regulation (76–76).

- Day 5 (December 7, 2004)

Team 1	Score	Team 2
Budućnost (Serbia and Montenegro)	104–98	(Greece) PAOK

- Day 6 (December 14, 2004)

Team 1	Score	Team 2
PAOK (Greece)	95–76	(Hungary) Debreceni Vadkakasok

- Day 7 (December 21, 2004)

Team 1	Score	Team 2
PAOK (Greece)	104–82	(France) BCM Gravelines-Dunkerque

- Day 8 (January 4, 2005)

Team 1	Score	Team 2
Spirou Charleroi (Belgium)	74–81	(Greece) PAOK

- Day 9 (January 12, 2005)

Team 1	Score	Team 2
Alba Berlin (Germany)	61–68	(Greece) PAOK

- Day 10 (January 18, 2005)

Team 1	Score	Team 2
PAOK (Greece)	92–75	(Serbia and Montenegro) Budućnost

- Group A standings:

Pos.	Team	Pld.	W	L	PF	PA	PD	Tie-break
1.	(Greece) PAOK	10	8	2	866	778	+88	
2.	(Belgium) Spirou Charleroi	10	7	3	790	734	+56	
3.	(France) BCM Gravelines-Dunkerque	10	5	5	846	846	0	
4.	(Germany) Alba Berlin	10	4	6	839	851	-12	1–1 (+6)
5.	(Serbia and Montenegro) Budućnost	10	4	6	801	860	-59	1–1 (-6)
6.	(Hungary) Debreceni Vadkakasok	10	2	8	778	851	-73	

==== Top 16 ====
- Tie played on February 1, 2005 and on February 9, 2005.

Team 1	Agg.	Team 2	1st leg	2nd leg
Cholet Basket (France)	146–152	(Greece) PAOK	75–78	71–74

==== Quarterfinals ====
- Tie played on March 1, 2005 and on March 8, 2005.

Team 1	Agg.	Team 2	1st leg	2nd leg
PAOK (Greece)	139–147	(Lithuania) Lietuvos rytas	74–71	65–76

=== 2005–06 FIBA EuroCup, 3rd–tier ===
The 2005–06 FIBA EuroCup was the 3rd installment of FIBA's 3rd-tier level European-wide professional club basketball competition FIBA EuroCup (lately called FIBA Europe Cup), running from October 25, 2005 to April 9, 2006. The trophy was won by DKV Joventut, who defeated Khimki by a result of 88–63 at Kyiv Palace of Sports in Kyiv, Ukraine. Overall, PAOK achieved in the present competition a record of 1 win against 5 defeats, in only one round. More detailed:

==== Regular season ====
- Day 1 (October 25, 2005)

Team 1	Score	Team 2
Fenerbahçe (Turkey)	101–91	(Greece) PAOK

- Day 2 (November 2, 2005)

Team 1	Score	Team 2
PAOK (Greece)	74–75*	(Cyprus) Proteas EKA AEL

^{*}Overtime at the end of regulation (68–68).

- Day 3 (November 9, 2005)

Team 1	Score	Team 2
PAOK (Greece)	74–69	(Estonia) Kalev Cramo

- Day 4 (November 16, 2005)

Team 1	Score	Team 2
PAOK (Greece)	84–88	(Turkey) Fenerbahçe

- Day 5 (November 23, 2005)

Team 1	Score	Team 2
Proteas EKA AEL (Cyprus)	84–67	(Greece) PAOK

- Day 6 (November 29, 2005)

Team 1	Score	Team 2
Kalev Cramo (Estonia)	127–76	(Greece) PAOK

- Group E standings:

Pos.	Team	Pld.	W	L	PF	PA	PD	Tie-break
1.	(Turkey) Fenerbahçe	6	5	1	528	478	+50	1–1 (+4)
2.	(Cyprus) Proteas EKA AEL	6	5	1	460	422	+38	1–1 (-4)
3.	(Estonia) Kalev Cramo	6	1	5	450	460	-10	1–1 (+46)
4.	(Greece) PAOK	6	1	5	466	544	-78	1–1 (-46)

=== 2006–07 ULEB Cup, 2nd–tier ===
The 2006–07 ULEB Cup was the 5th installment of ULEB's 2nd-tier level European-wide professional club basketball competition ULEB Cup (lately called EuroCup Basketball), running from October 31, 2006 to April 10, 2007. The trophy was won by Real Madrid, who defeated Lietuvos rytas by a result of 87–75 at Spiroudome in Charleroi, Belgium. Overall, PAOK achieved in the present competition a record of 6 wins against 6 defeats, in two successive rounds. More detailed:

==== Regular season ====
- Day 1 (October 31, 2006)

Team 1	Score	Team 2
PAOK (Greece)	68–78	(Serbia) Crvena zvezda

- Day 2 (November 7, 2006)

Team 1	Score	Team 2
Real Madrid (Spain)	69–45	(Greece) PAOK

- Day 3 (November 14, 2006)

Team 1	Score	Team 2
PAOK (Greece)	83–69	(Belgium) Dexia Union Mons-Hainaut

- Day 4 (November 21, 2006)

Team 1	Score	Team 2
EiffelTowers Den Bosch (Netherlands)	71–78	(Greece) PAOK

- Day 5 (November 28, 2006)

Team 1	Score	Team 2
PAOK (Greece)	84–81	(Russia) UNICS

- Day 6 (December 5, 2006)

Team 1	Score	Team 2
Crvena zvezda (Serbia)	81–85	(Greece) PAOK

- Day 7 (December 12, 2006)

Team 1	Score	Team 2
PAOK (Greece)	53–76	(Spain) Real Madrid

- Day 8 (December 19, 2006)

Team 1	Score	Team 2
Dexia Union Mons-Hainaut (Belgium)	80–82	(Greece) PAOK

- Day 9 (January 9, 2007)

Team 1	Score	Team 2
PAOK (Greece)	90–88	(Netherlands) EiffelTowers Den Bosch

- Day 10 (January 16, 2007)

Team 1	Score	Team 2
UNICS (Russia)	85–57	(Greece) PAOK

- Group D standings:

Pos.	Team	Pld.	W	L	PF	PA	PD	Tie-break
1.	(Spain) Real Madrid	10	7	3	823	723	+100	2–2 (+15)
2.	(Russia) UNICS	10	7	3	896	720	+76	2–2 (+9)
3.	(Serbia) Crvena zvezda	10	7	3	839	793	+46	2–2 (-24)
4.	(Greece) PAOK	10	6	4	725	778	-53	
5.	(Netherlands) EiffelTowers Den Bosch	10	2	8	810	874	-64	
6.	(Belgium) Dexia Union Mons-Hainaut	10	1	9	791	896	-105	

==== Top 16 ====
- Tie played on January 30, 2007 and on February 13, 2007.

Team 1	Agg.	Team 2	1st leg	2nd leg
PAOK (Greece)	139–159	(Italy) Montepaschi Siena	62–79	77–80

=== 2007–08 FIBA EuroCup, 3rd–tier ===
The 2007–08 FIBA EuroCup was the 5th installment of FIBA's 3rd-tier level European-wide professional club basketball competition FIBA EuroCup (lately called FIBA Europe Cup), running from October 30, 2007 to April 20, 2008. The trophy was won by Barons LMT, who defeated Dexia Union Mons-Hainaut by a result of 63–62 at Spyros Kyprianou Athletic Center in Limassol, Cyprus. Overall, PAOK Marfin achieved in the present competition a record of 3 wins against 5 defeats, in three successive rounds. More detailed:

==== First round ====
- Bye

==== Second round ====
- Tie played on November 20, 2007 and on November 27, 2007.

Team 1	Agg.	Team 2	1st leg	2nd leg
PAOK Marfin (Greece)	150–139	(Romania) U-Mobitelco Cluj-Napoca	79–74	71–65

==== Top 16 ====
- Day 1 (December 11, 2007)

Team 1	Score	Team 2
PAOK Marfin (Greece)	58–69	(Estonia) Tartu ÜSK Rock

- Day 2 (December 17, 2007)

Team 1	Score	Team 2
Lappeenrannan NMKY (Finland)	83–74	(Greece) PAOK Marfin

- Day 3 (December 11, 2007)

Team 1	Score	Team 2
PAOK Marfin (Greece)	65–73*	(Russia) CSK VVS Samara

^{*}Overtime at the end of regulation (63–63).

- Day 4 (January 15, 2008)

Team 1	Score	Team 2
Tartu ÜSK Rock (Estonia)	90–80	(Greece) PAOK Marfin

- Day 5 (January 22, 2008)

Team 1	Score	Team 2
PAOK Marfin (Greece)	80–76	(Finland) Lappeenrannan NMKY

- Day 6 (January 29, 2008)

Team 1	Score	Team 2
CSK VVS Samara (Russia)	80–61	(Greece) PAOK Marfin

- Group A standings:

Pos.	Team	Pld.	W	L	PF	PA	PD	Tie-break
1.	(Estonia) Tartu ÜSK Rock	6	5	1	481	438	+43	1–1 (+8)
2.	(Russia) CSK VVS Samara	6	5	1	459	426	+33	1–1 (-8)
3.	(Finland) Lappeenrannan NMKY	6	1	5	483	506	-23	1–1 (+5)
4.	(Greece) PAOK Marfin	6	1	5	418	471	-53	1–1 (-5)

== 2010s ==
=== 2010–11 Eurocup Basketball, 2nd–tier ===
==== Qualifying round ====
- Bye

==== Regular season ====
- Day 1 (November 16, 2010)

Team 1	Score	Team 2
Asefa Estudiantes (Spain)	88–77	(Greece) PAOK

- Day 2 (November 23, 2010)

Team 1	Score	Team 2
PAOK (Greece)	62–67	(Italy) Benetton Bwin Treviso

- Day 3 (November 30, 2010)

Team 1	Score	Team 2
PAOK (Greece)	92–74	(France) Chorale Roanne

- Day 4 (December 7, 2010)

Team 1	Score	Team 2
Chorale Roanne (France)	60–72	(Greece) PAOK

- Day 5 (December 14, 2010)

Team 1	Score	Team 2
PAOK (Greece)	77–72	(Spain) Asefa Estudiantes

- Day 6 (December 21, 2010)

Team 1	Score	Team 2
Benetton Bwin Treviso (Italy)	77–69	(Greece) PAOK

- Group F standings:

Pos.	Team	Pld.	W	L	PF	PA	PD	Tie-break
1.	(Italy) Benetton Bwin Treviso	6	6	0	454	414	+40	
2.	(Spain) Asefa Estudiantes	6	3	3	483	462	+21	1–1 (+6)
3.	(Greece) PAOK	6	3	3	449	438	+11	1–1 (-6)
4.	(France) Chorale Roanne	6	0	6	423	495	-72	

=== 2011–12 Turkish Airlines Euroleague, 1st–tier ===
==== Qualifying round 1 ====
- September 30, 2011 at Siemens Arena, in Vilnius, Lithuania.

Team 1	Score	Team 2
PAOK (Greece)	64–77	(Turkey) Galatasaray Medical Park

Losers of qualifying tournaments entered 2011–12 Eurocup Basketball regular season.

==== 2011–12 Eurocup Basketball, 2nd–tier ====
===== Regular season =====
- Day 1 (November 15, 2011)

Team 1	Score	Team 2
VEF Rīga (Latvia)	80–74	(Greece) PAOK

- Day 2 (November 22, 2011)

Team 1	Score	Team 2
PAOK (Greece)	74–62	(France) Cholet Basket

- Day 3 (November 29, 2011)

Team 1	Score	Team 2
PAOK (Greece)	62–71	(Russia) Khimki

- Day 4 (December 6, 2011)

Team 1	Score	Team 2
Khimki (Russia)	89–65	(Greece) PAOK

- Day 5 (December 13, 2011)

Team 1	Score	Team 2
PAOK (Greece)	76–81	(Latvia) VEF Rīga

- Day 6 (December 20, 2011)

Team 1	Score	Team 2
Cholet Basket (France)	69–66	(Greece) PAOK

- Group B standings:

Pos.	Team	Pld.	W	L	PF	PA	PD
1.	(Russia) Khimki	6	6	0	480	398	+82
2.	(Latvia) VEF Rīga	6	3	3	436	444	-8
3.	(France) Cholet Basket	6	2	4	389	428	-39
4.	(Greece) PAOK	6	1	5	417	452	-35

=== 2013–14 Eurocup Basketball, 2nd–tier ===
==== Regular season ====
- Day 1 (October 15, 2013)

Team 1	Score	Team 2
PAOK (Greece)	85–84	(Montenegro) Budućnost VOLI

- Day 2 (October 23, 2013)

Team 1	Score	Team 2
Bericap Alba Fehérvár (Hungary)	88–89	(Greece) PAOK

- Day 3 (October 30, 2013)

Team 1	Score	Team 2
PAOK (Greece)	75–77	(Turkey) Aykon TED Ankara

- Day 4 (November 6, 2013)

Team 1	Score	Team 2
PAOK (Greece)	77–69	(Ukraine) Khimik

- Day 5 (November 13, 2013)

Team 1	Score	Team 2
Nizhny Novgorod (Russia)	87–53	(Greece) PAOK

- Day 6 (November 19, 2013)

Team 1	Score	Team 2
Budućnost VOLI (Montenegro)	69–75	(Greece) PAOK

- Day 7 (November 27, 2013)

Team 1	Score	Team 2
PAOK (Greece)	68–64	(Hungary) Bericap Alba Fehérvár

- Day 8 (December 4, 2013)

Team 1	Score	Team 2
Aykon TED Ankara (Turkey)	84–65	(Greece) PAOK

- Day 9 (December 10, 2013)

Team 1	Score	Team 2
Khimik (Ukraine)	70–58	(Greece) PAOK

- Day 10 (December 18, 2013)

Team 1	Score	Team 2
PAOK (Greece)	52–60	(Russia) Nizhny Novgorod

- Group F standings:

Pos.	Team	Pld.	W	L	PF	PA	PD	Tie-break
1.	(Russia) Nizhny Novgorod	10	8	2	809	705	+104	
2.	(Ukraine) Khimik	10	6	4	786	732	+54	1–1 (+22)
3.	(Turkey) Aykon TED Ankara	10	6	4	788	774	+14	1–1 (-22)
4.	(Greece) PAOK	10	5	5	620	683	-63	
5.	(Montenegro) Budućnost VOLI	10	3	7	772	802	-30	
6.	(Hungary) Bericap Alba Fehérvár	10	2	8	720	807	-87	

=== 2014–15 Eurocup Basketball, 2nd–tier ===
==== Regular season ====
- Day 1 (October 15, 2014)

Team 1	Score	Team 2
Pınar Karşıyaka (Turkey)	81–87*	(Greece) PAOK

^{*}Two overtimes at the end of regulation (66–66 and 73–73).

- Day 2 (October 22, 2014)

Team 1	Score	Team 2
PAOK (Greece)	85–66	(Poland) Stelmet Zielona Góra

- Day 3 (October 28, 2014)

Team 1	Score	Team 2
Lokomotiv Kuban (Russia)	87–46	(Greece) PAOK

- Day 4 (November 5, 2014)

Team 1	Score	Team 2
Ventspils (Latvia)	63–66	(Greece) PAOK

- Day 5 (November 12, 2014)

Team 1	Score	Team 2
PAOK (Greece)	80–60	(Montenegro) Budućnost VOLI

- Day 6 (November 19, 2014)

Team 1	Score	Team 2
PAOK (Greece)	74–79	(Turkey) Pınar Karşıyaka

- Day 7 (November 25, 2014)

Team 1	Score	Team 2
Stelmet Zielona Góra (Poland)	84–77	(Greece) PAOK

- Day 8 (December 3, 2014)

Team 1	Score	Team 2
PAOK (Greece)	54–68	(Russia) Lokomotiv Kuban

- Day 9 (December 10, 2014)

Team 1	Score	Team 2
PAOK (Greece)	76–62	(Latvia) Ventspils

- Day 10 (December 17, 2014)

Team 1	Score	Team 2
Budućnost VOLI (Montenegro)	76–81	(Greece) PAOK

- Group F standings:

Pos.	Team	Pld.	W	L	PF	PA	PD	Tie-break
1.	(Russia) Lokomotiv Kuban	10	10	0	795	653	+142	
2.	(Greece) PAOK	10	6	4	726	726	0	1–1 (+1)
3.	(Turkey) Pınar Karşıyaka	10	6	4	780	763	+17	1–1 (-1)
4.	(Montenegro) Budućnost VOLI	10	3	7	784	797	-13	2–0
5.	(Poland) Stelmet Zielona Góra	10	3	7	722	809	-87	0–2
6.	(Latvia) Ventspils	10	2	8	665	724	-59	

==== Last 32 ====
- Day 1 (January 7, 2015)

Team 1	Score	Team 2
Limoges CSP (France)	71–59	(Greece) PAOK

- Day 2 (January 14, 2015)

Team 1	Score	Team 2
PAOK (Greece)	78–77	(Italy) FoxTown Cantù

- Day 3 (January 21, 2015)

Team 1	Score	Team 2
PAOK (Greece)	78–82	(Russia) Khimki

- Day 4 (January 28, 2015)

Team 1	Score	Team 2
Khimki (Russia)	102–68	(Greece) PAOK

- Day 5 (February 4, 2015)

Team 1	Score	Team 2
PAOK (Greece)	68–79	(France) Limoges CSP

- Day 6 (February 11, 2015)

Team 1	Score	Team 2
FoxTown Cantù (Italy)	78–70	(Greece) PAOK

- Group J standings:

Pos.	Team	Pld.	W	L	PF	PA	PD	Tie-break
1.	(Russia) Khimki	6	5	1	512	449	+63	
2.	(Italy) FoxTown Cantù	6	3	3	454	449	+5	1–1 (0)
3.	(France) Limoges CSP	6	3	3	430	430	0	1–1 (0)
4.	(Greece) PAOK	6	1	5	421	489	-68	

=== 2015–16 Eurocup Basketball, 2nd–tier ===
==== Regular season ====
- Day 1 (October 14, 2015)

Team 1	Score	Team 2
PAOK (Greece)	72–69	(Hungary) Szolnoki Olaj

- Day 2 (October 21, 2015)

Team 1	Score	Team 2
Zenit Saint Petersburg (Russia)	76–66	(Greece) PAOK

- Day 3 (October 28, 2015)

Team 1	Score	Team 2
PAOK (Greece)	80–100	(Turkey) Beşiktaş Sompo Japan

- Day 4 (November 4, 2015)

Team 1	Score	Team 2
Avtodor Saratov (Russia)	90–68	(Greece) PAOK

- Day 5 (November 11, 2015)

Team 1	Score	Team 2
PAOK (Greece)	81–76	(Lithuania) Lietuvos rytas

- Day 6 (November 18, 2015)

Team 1	Score	Team 2
Szolnoki Olaj (Hungary)	78–69	(Greece) PAOK

- Day 7 (November 25, 2015)

Team 1	Score	Team 2
PAOK (Greece)	70–89	(Russia) Zenit Saint Petersburg

- Day 8 (December 2, 2015)

Team 1	Score	Team 2
Beşiktaş Sompo Japan (Turkey)	73–75*	(Greece) PAOK

^{*}Overtime at the end of regulation (62–62).

- Day 9 (December 9, 2015)

Team 1	Score	Team 2
PAOK (Greece)	104–99	(Russia) Avtodor Saratov

- Day 10 (December 16, 2015)

Team 1	Score	Team 2
Lietuvos rytas (Lithuania)	81–88	(Greece) PAOK

- Group E standings:

Pos.	Team	Pld.	W	L	PF	PA	PD	Tie-break
1.	(Russia) Zenit Saint Petersburg	10	8	2	820	746	+74	
2.	(Russia) Avtodor Saratov	10	7	3	947	839	+108	
3.	(Greece) PAOK	10	5	5	773	831	-58	
4.	(Hungary) Szolnoki Olaj	10	4	6	763	827	-64	1–1 (+9)
5.	(Turkey) Beşiktaş Sompo Japan	10	4	6	810	842	-32	1–1 (-9)
6.	(Lithuania) Lietuvos rytas	10	2	8	856	884	-28	

==== Last 32 ====
- Day 1 (January 6, 2016)

Team 1	Score	Team 2
Valencia Basket (Spain)	78–62	(Greece) PAOK

- Day 2 (January 12, 2016)

Team 1	Score	Team 2
PAOK (Greece)	88–75	(France) Limoges CSP

- Day 3 (January 19, 2016)

Team 1	Score	Team 2
PAOK (Greece)	68–81	(Germany) EWE Baskets Oldenburg

- Day 4 (January 26, 2016)

Team 1	Score	Team 2
EWE Baskets Oldenburg (Germany)	83–71	(Greece) PAOK

- Day 5 (February 3, 2016)

Team 1	Score	Team 2
PAOK (Greece)	75–72	(Spain) Valencia Basket

- Day 6 (February 10, 2016)

Team 1	Score	Team 2
Limoges CSP (France)	79–61	(Greece) PAOK

- Group I standings:

Pos.	Team	Pld.	W	L	PF	PA	PD	Tie-break
1.	(Germany) EWE Baskets Oldenburg	6	4	2	494	490	+4	
2.	(France) Limoges CSP	6	3	3	494	467	+27	2–0
3.	(Spain) Valencia Basket	6	3	3	474	462	+12	0–2
4.	(Greece) PAOK	6	2	4	425	468	-43	

=== 2016–17 Basketball Champions League ===
==== First round ====
- Bye

==== Second round ====
- Bye

==== Regular season ====
- Day 1 (October 19, 2016)

Team 1	Score	Team 2
Rosa Radom (Poland)	93–85*	(Greece) PAOK

^{*}Three overtimes at the end of regulation (65–65, 71–71 and 79–79).

- Day 2 (October 25, 2016)

Team 1	Score	Team 2
PAOK (Greece)	59–52	(Turkey) Muratbey Uşak Sportif

- Day 3 (November 1, 2016)

Team 1	Score	Team 2
Openjobmetis Varese (Italy)	70–75	(Greece) PAOK

- Day 4 (November 8, 2016)

Team 1	Score	Team 2
PAOK (Greece)	61–67	(France) ASVEL

- Day 5 (November 16, 2016)

Team 1	Score	Team 2
Neptūnas (Lithuania)	68–63	(Greece) PAOK

- Day 6 (November 22, 2016)

Team 1	Score	Team 2
EWE Baskets Oldenburg (Germany)	67–62	(Greece) PAOK

- Day 7 (November 30, 2016)

Team 1	Score	Team 2
PAOK (Greece)	85–81*	(Latvia) Ventspils

^{*}Overtime at the end of regulation (71–71).

- Day 8 (December 6, 2016)

Team 1	Score	Team 2
PAOK (Greece)	85–66	(Poland) Rosa Radom

- Day 9 (December 14, 2016)

Team 1	Score	Team 2
Muratbey Uşak Sportif (Turkey)	78–77	(Greece) PAOK

- Day 10 (December 21, 2016)

Team 1	Score	Team 2
PAOK (Greece)	78–69	(Italy) Openjobmetis Varese

- Day 11 (January 4, 2017)

Team 1	Score	Team 2
ASVEL (France)	70–56	(Greece) PAOK

- Day 12 (January 10, 2017)

Team 1	Score	Team 2
PAOK (Greece)	82–73	(Lithuania) Neptūnas

- Day 13 (January 18, 2017)

Team 1	Score	Team 2
PAOK (Greece)	79–82	(Germany) EWE Baskets Oldenburg

- Day 14 (January 25, 2017)

Team 1	Score	Team 2
Ventspils (Latvia)	54–84	(Greece) PAOK

- Group E standings:

Pos.	Team	Pld.	Pts.	W	L	PF	PA	PD	Tie-break	Qualification
1.	(France) ASVEL	14	24	10	4	1063	977	+86	3–1	
2.	(Lithuania) Neptūnas	14	24	10	4	1051	958	+93	2–2	
3.	(Germany) EWE Baskets Oldenburg	14	24	10	4	1070	983	+87	1–3	Qualifiers
4.	(Greece) PAOK	14	21	7	7	1031	990	+41	2–0	Qualifiers
5.	(Latvia) Ventspils	14	21	7	7	1061	1057	+4	0–2	Qualifiers
6.	(Turkey) Muratbey Uşak Sportif	14	19	5	9	1056	1092	-36		
7.	(Italy) Openjobmetis Varese	14	18	4	10	981	1123	-142		
8.	(Poland) Rosa Radom	14	17	3	11	959	1092	-133		

==== Playoffs qualifiers ====
- Tie played on February 8, 2017 and on February 22, 2017.

Team 1	Agg.	Team 2	1st leg	2nd leg
PAOK (Greece)	156–154	(Serbia) Partizan NIS	74–76	82–78

==== Top 16 ====
- Tie played on February 28, 2017 and on March 8, 2017.

Team 1	Agg.	Team 2	1st leg	2nd leg
PAOK (Greece)	120–143	(Spain) Iberostar Tenerife	66–63	54–80

=== 2017–18 Basketball Champions League ===
==== First round ====
- Bye

==== Second round ====
- Bye

==== Third round ====
- Bye

==== Regular season ====
- Day 1 (October 10, 2017)

Team 1	Score	Team 2
MHP Riesen Ludwigsburg (Germany)	103–70	(Greece) PAOK

- Day 2 (October 18, 2017)

Team 1	Score	Team 2
PAOK (Greece)	82–85	(Turkey) Gaziantep

- Day 3 (October 24, 2017)

Team 1	Score	Team 2
SikeliArchivi Capo d'Orlando (Italy)	58–63	(Greece) PAOK

- Day 4 (October 31, 2017)

Team 1	Score	Team 2
Élan Chalon (France)	75–61	(Greece) PAOK

- Day 5 (November 8, 2017)

Team 1	Score	Team 2
PAOK (Greece)	74–79	(Spain) Iberostar Tenerife

- Day 6 (November 15, 2017)

Team 1	Score	Team 2
Neptūnas (Lithuania)	82–69	(Greece) PAOK

- Day 7 (December 5, 2017)

Team 1	Score	Team 2
PAOK (Greece)	83–76	(Latvia) Ventspils

- Day 8 (December 13, 2017)

Team 1	Score	Team 2
PAOK (Greece)	63–83	(Germany) MHP Riesen Ludwigsburg

- Day 9 (December 20, 2017)

Team 1	Score	Team 2
Gaziantep (Turkey)	65–77*	(Greece) PAOK

^{*}Overtime at the end of regulation (62–62).

- Day 10 (January 9, 2018)

Team 1	Score	Team 2
PAOK (Greece)	79–61	(Italy) SikeliArchivi Capo d'Orlando

- Day 11 (January 16, 2018)

Team 1	Score	Team 2
PAOK (Greece)	90–81	(France) Élan Chalon

- Day 12 (January 24, 2018)

Team 1	Score	Team 2
Iberostar Tenerife (Spain)	93–79	(Greece) PAOK

- Day 13 (January 31, 2018)

Team 1	Score	Team 2
PAOK (Greece)	91–70	(Lithuania) Neptūnas

- Day 14 (February 6, 2018)

Team 1	Score	Team 2
Ventspils (Latvia)	59–80	(Greece) PAOK

- Group B standings:

Pos.	Team	Pld.	Pts.	W	L	PF	PA	PD	Tie-break
1.	(Spain) Iberostar Tenerife	14	26	12	2	1155	921	+234	2–0
2.	(Germany) MHP Riesen Ludwigsburg	14	26	12	2	1139	974	+165	0–2
3.	(Greece) PAOK	14	21	7	7	1061	1070	-9	1–1 (+8)
4.	(Lithuania) Neptūnas	14	21	7	7	1164	1116	+48	1–1 (-8)
5.	(Latvia) Ventspils	14	20	6	8	1034	1085	-51	2–0
6.	(France) Élan Chalon	14	20	6	8	1018	1031	-13	0–2
7.	(Turkey) Gaziantep	14	18	4	10	1033	1192	-159	
8.	(Italy) SikeliArchivi Capo d'Orlando	14	16	2	12	887	1102	-215	

==== Top 16 ====
- Tie played on March 6, 2018 and on March 14, 2018.

Team 1	Agg.	Team 2	1st leg	2nd leg
PAOK (Greece)	141–147	(Turkey) Pınar Karşıyaka	74–68	67–79

=== 2018–19 Basketball Champions League ===
==== First round ====
- Bye

==== Second round ====
- Bye

==== Third round ====
- Bye

==== Regular season ====
- Day 1 (October 9, 2018)

Team 1	Score	Team 2
Umana Reyer Venezia (Italy)	69–59	(Greece) PAOK

- Day 2 (October 16, 2018)

Team 1	Score	Team 2
PAOK (Greece)	95–100	(Germany) Telekom Baskets Bonn

- Day 3 (October 23, 2018)

Team 1	Score	Team 2
Hapoel Unet Holon (Israel)	72–68	(Greece) PAOK

- Day 4 (October 30, 2018)

Team 1	Score	Team 2
PAOK (Greece)	83–82	(France) Nanterre 92

- Day 5 (November 6, 2018)

Team 1	Score	Team 2
Opava (Czech Republic)	69–94	(Greece) PAOK

- Day 6 (November 14, 2018)

Team 1	Score	Team 2
PAOK (Greece)	92–61	(Switzerland) Fribourg Olympic

- Day 7 (November 21, 2018)

Team 1	Score	Team 2
Iberostar Tenerife (Spain)	65–66	(Greece) PAOK

- Day 8 (December 12, 2018)

Team 1	Score	Team 2
PAOK (Greece)	77–76	(Italy) Umana Reyer Venezia

- Day 9 (December 18, 2018)

Team 1	Score	Team 2
Telekom Baskets Bonn (Germany)	94–77	(Greece) PAOK

- Day 10 (January 8, 2019)

Team 1	Score	Team 2
PAOK (Greece)	92–77	(Israel) Hapoel Unet Holon

- Day 11 (January 16, 2019)

Team 1	Score	Team 2
Nanterre 92 (France)	79–70	(Greece) PAOK

- Day 12 (January 23, 2019)

Team 1	Score	Team 2
PAOK (Greece)	93–43	(Czech Republic) Opava

- Day 13 (January 30, 2019)

Team 1	Score	Team 2
Fribourg Olympic (Switzerland)	64–84	(Greece) PAOK

- Day 14 (February 5, 2019)

Team 1	Score	Team 2
PAOK (Greece)	77–85	(Spain) Iberostar Tenerife

- Group B standings:

Pos.	Team	Pld.	Pts.	W	L	PF	PA	PD	Tie-break
1.	(Spain) Iberostar Tenerife	14	26	12	2	1164	945	+219	
2.	(Italy) Umana Reyer Venezia	14	24	10	4	1170	1096	+74	
3.	(France) Nanterre 92	14	22	8	6	1159	1046	+113	1–1 (+8)
4.	(Greece) PAOK	14	22	8	6	1127	1036	+91	1–1 (-8)
5.	(Israel) Hapoel Unet Holon	14	21	7	7	1145	1117	+28	
6.	(Germany) Telekom Baskets Bonn	14	20	6	8	1120	1181	-61	
7.	(Switzerland) Fribourg Olympic	14	17	3	11	1057	1184	-127	
8.	(Czech Republic) Opava	14	16	2	12	952	1289	-337	

==== Top 16 ====
- Tie played on March 5, 2019 and on March 13, 2019.

Team 1	Agg.	Team 2	1st leg	2nd leg
PAOK (Greece)	138–146	(Greece) AEK	75–84	63–62

== Record ==
PAOK B.C. has overall from 1959–60 (first participation), to 2015–16 (last participation),: 207 wins against 158 defeats in 365 games, in all of the European-wide club basketball competitions.

- EuroLeague: 55–49 (104)
  - FIBA Saporta Cup: 48–21 plus 1 draw (70) /// EuroCup: 40–40 (80)
    - FIBA Korać Cup: 46–28 (74) /// FIBA EuroCup: 9–12 (21)
      - FIBA Europe Champions Cup: 9–7 (16)
