= Frank Kaminsky =

American basketball player (born 1993)

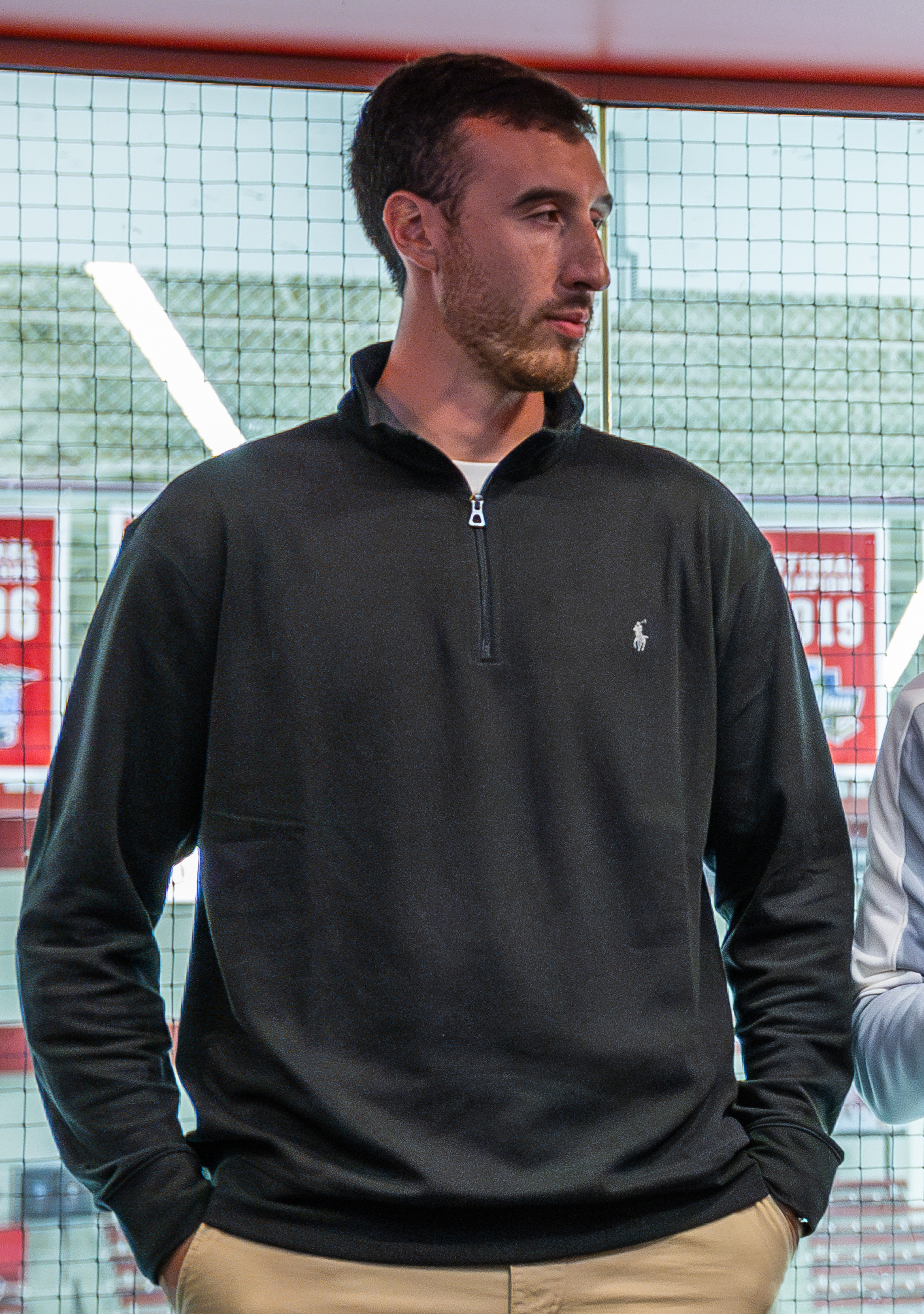
- Kaminsky in 2024

No. 44 – Alvark Tokyo
- Position: Center / power forward
- League: B.League

Personal information
- Born: April 4, 1993 (age 33) Winfield, Illinois, U.S.
- Listed height: 7 ft 0 in (2.13 m)
- Listed weight: 240 lb (109 kg)

Career information
- High school: Benet Academy (Lisle, Illinois)
- College: Wisconsin (2011–2015)
- NBA draft: 2015: 1st round, 9th overall pick
- Drafted by: Charlotte Hornets
- Playing career: 2015–present

Career history
- 2015–2019: Charlotte Hornets
- 2019–2022: Phoenix Suns
- 2022–2023: Atlanta Hawks
- 2023: Houston Rockets
- 2023–2024: Partizan
- 2024–2025: Raptors 905
- 2025–present: Alvark Tokyo

Career highlights
- National college player of the year (2015); Consensus first-team All-American (2015); Kareem Abdul-Jabbar Award (2015); Big Ten Player of the Year (2015); 2× First-team All-Big Ten (2014, 2015); Big Ten tournament MOP (2015); No. 44 jersey retired by Wisconsin Badgers
- Stats at NBA.com
- Stats at Basketball Reference

Francis Stanley Kaminsky III (born April 4, 1993) is an American professional basketball player for Alvark Tokyo of the Japanese B.League. He played college basketball for the Wisconsin Badgers.

During his college career, Kaminsky set the Wisconsin single-game record for points (43). He was the unanimous men's National College Player of the Year in 2015. Kaminsky was drafted ninth overall by the Charlotte Hornets in the 2015 NBA draft. He played with Charlotte for four seasons before signing with the Phoenix Suns as a free agent in July 2019. With the Suns, he reached the NBA Finals in 2021.

== Early life ==
Kaminsky's father, Frank Jr., played basketball at Lewis University. His mother, Mary, played volleyball at Northwestern. Kaminsky, who is of Polish and Serbian ancestry, grew up in Woodridge, Illinois in a Serbian community. In 1998, when he was 5 years old, his aunt Karen Stack Umlauf and uncle Jim Stack worked for the Chicago Bulls, and he had access to the practice facility when Michael Jordan, Scottie Pippen and Dennis Rodman were on the team. Until high school, Kaminsky participated in basketball tournaments organized by Serb National Federation as a member of the Serbian Eagles A.C.

Kaminsky attended Benet Academy in Lisle, Illinois. He was named first-team all-state by the Chicago Sun-Times and IBCA and second-team all-state by the AP after averaging 14.2 points, 8.7 rebounds, 4.2 blocks and 2.8 assists during his senior season. He led the Redwings to a 29–1 season after being defeated in the Sectional Semifinals by the East Aurora Tomcats that were led by Connecticut Huskies superstar and National Champion Ryan Boatright. He was also named all-area, all-conference and East Suburban Catholic Conference Player of the Year. Kaminsky's jersey number, 44, was retired in a ceremony at Benet Academy on November 18, 2017.

Kaminsky has stated that his family had Chicago White Sox season tickets when he was a child and has described himself as a "die-hard White Sox fan." He threw out the first pitch at a White Sox game against the St. Louis Cardinals on July 21, 2015, stating in a pre-game interview that a saying in his family was, "We have two favorite teams in the MLB, the White Sox and whoever is playing the Cubs."

== College career ==
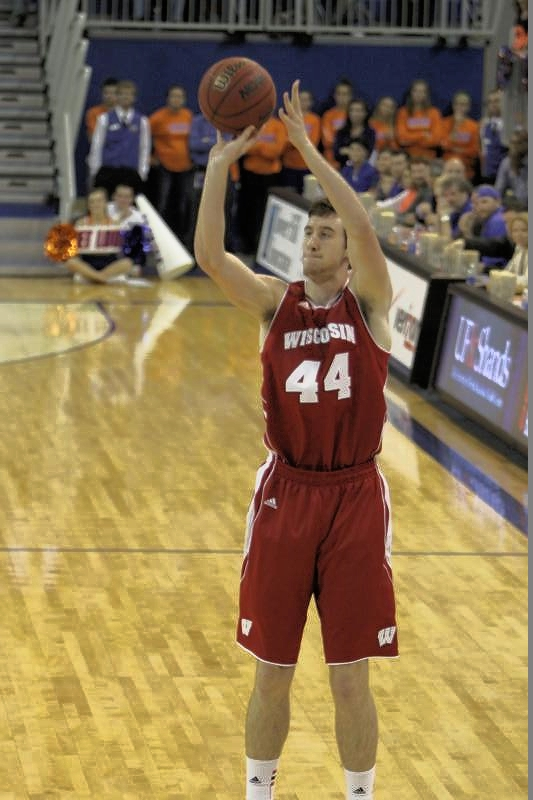
Kaminsky with Wisconsin in 2012

Kaminsky played in 35 of 36 games as a freshman. He scored a season-high nine points against UMKC on November 22, 2011.

Kaminsky played in 32 games, starting the first two games of the season. He finished the season averaging 4.2 points and 1.8 rebounds per game. He led the team in free-throw percentage at 76.7%. He posted a season-high 19 points at Illinois on February 3, 2013.

On November 19, 2013, Kaminsky broke the Wisconsin single-game scoring record with 43 points against North Dakota. Kaminsky shot 16 of 19 from the field, including six of six from 3-point range and five of six from the free throw line. The previous Wisconsin single-game record was 42 points, set by Ken Barnes (vs. Indiana on March 8, 1965) and Michael Finley (vs. Eastern Michigan on December 10, 1994).

At the conclusion of the regular season, Kaminsky was named first-team All-Big Ten.

On March 29, 2014, Kaminsky scored 28 points and had 11 rebounds as Wisconsin defeated #1 seeded Arizona 64–63 in overtime during the NCAA tournament to advance to the Final Four. After the game, Kaminsky was named West Regional Most Outstanding Player.

Ahead of the 2014 season, Kaminsky was named the Big Ten preseason player of the year. The Badgers were unanimously picked to win the Big Ten Championship.

The Badgers and Kaminsky validated those predictions. The Badgers had a 36–3 record in games Kaminsky played. They won the Big Ten regular season title with a 16–2 record and the Big Ten tournament title. After becoming the first NCAA tournament 1-seed in school history, they made their way to their second consecutive Final Four. There, they avenged their previous season's loss to Kentucky, upsetting the 38–0 Wildcats 71–64 behind Kaminsky's 20 points and 11 rebounds. In the Badgers' first national championship game in 74 years, they lost a 9-point second-half lead and were defeated 68–63 by the Duke Blue Devils. Kaminsky finished with 21 points and 12 rebounds. For the season, he finished with 18.8 PPG and 8.2 RPG, despite playing for a team that ranked 346th out of 351 in adjusted tempo. He led the nation in PER, an efficiency-based stat. Wisconsin boasted the highest adjusted offensive efficiency in KenPom history.

Kaminsky was named consensus first-team All-American. On March 31, 2015, he was named the National Association of Basketball Coaches Player of the Year. On April 3 he was named Associated Press College Basketball Player of the Year, the first Wisconsin player to receive the award since its creation in 1961. He also received the Oscar Robertson Trophy as the United States Basketball Writers Association College Player of the Year. On April 5, he was named the Naismith College Player of the Year. On April 10, he won both the John R. Wooden Award and Kareem Abdul-Jabbar Center of the Year Award. On June 12 Kaminsky was named University of Wisconsin's Male Athlete of the Year. He graduated with a life sciences communication major that same year. In 2015, the National Polish-American Sports Hall of Fame awarded its NPASHF Excellence in Sports Award to Kaminsky.

== Professional career ==
=== Charlotte Hornets (2015–2019) ===
On June 25, 2015, Kaminsky was selected with the ninth overall pick by the Charlotte Hornets in the 2015 NBA draft. On December 2, he scored 16 points in a 116–99 loss to the Golden State Warriors, earning increased minutes with starting center Al Jefferson out injured. On December 23, he scored a then career-high 23 points in a 102–89 loss to the Boston Celtics. On December 30, he had his second 20-point outing of the season in a 122–117 loss to the Los Angeles Clippers. On April 10, 2016, he recorded 18 points and a then career-high 11 rebounds in a 113–98 loss to the Washington Wizards. In Game 3 of the Hornets' first-round playoff series against the Miami Heat, Kaminsky scored 15 points in a 96–80 win.

On November 21, 2016, Kaminsky tied a career high with 23 points on 9-of-11 shooting in a 105–90 loss to the Memphis Grizzlies. On February 1, 2017, he set a new career high with 24 points off the bench in a 126–111 loss to the Golden State Warriors. He topped that mark on February 15, scoring 27 points in a 90–85 loss to the Toronto Raptors. On February 25, he recorded 23 points and a career-high 13 rebounds in a 99–85 win over the Sacramento Kings. On April 8, he recorded a then career-high 7 assists in a loss to the Boston Celtics.

On November 20, 2017, Kaminsky scored a season-high 24 points in a 118–102 win over the Minnesota Timberwolves. On December 18, he scored 24 points in a 109–91 win over the New York Knicks. On April 10, 2018, he scored 24 points in a 119–93 win over the Indiana Pacers.

On November 21, 2018, after scoring just nine points over the Hornets' first 16 games of the 2018–19 season, Kaminsky had 11 points off the bench in a 127–109 win over the Pacers. He lost his spot in the rotation in 2018–19 under new coach James Borrego, appearing in just 26 games at the conclusion of February. On March 1, 2019, he was inserted into the rotation to combat zone defense with his passing ability, going on to score 15 points in a 123–112 win over the Brooklyn Nets. On April 5, he recorded 22 points and 13 rebounds in a 113–111 win over the Raptors. Two days later, he scored a season-high 24 points in a 104–91 win over the Detroit Pistons.

=== Phoenix Suns (2019–2022) ===
On July 17, 2019, Kaminsky signed a two-year, $10 million deal with the Phoenix Suns. Kaminsky scored a season-high 24 points in a 115–108 loss to the Memphis Grizzlies on December 11. Entering 2020, Kaminsky was initially sidelined with a right knee injury before having a left patella stress fracture sideline him for most of the rest of the season. He returned to action during the 2020 NBA Bubble period on July 31, 2020, helping the Suns with a 125–112 win over the Washington Wizards. Kaminsky ultimately helped the team by coming off the bench for the majority of the rest of the season, ending with a record of 8–0 in the 2020 NBA Bubble, with Phoenix thus having a winning streak of at least eight games for the first time since March 2010.

On November 19, 2020, Kaminsky had his second year on his contract waived, entering free agency early. On November 29, Kaminsky signed with the Sacramento Kings, but was later waived by the Kings on December 20 after appearing in four preseason games. Once he cleared waivers, Kaminsky was re-signed by the Suns on a more team-friendly, one-year deal that season. On January 28, 2021, he was two assists shy from a triple-double night, recording 12 points, 13 rebounds, and a career-high eight assists off the bench in a 114–93 win over the Golden State Warriors. Later moving up to a starting power forward role in February, Kaminsky had another near-triple-double performance on February 10 with 12 points, 8 rebounds, and a career high-tying eight assists in a close 125–124 win over the Milwaukee Bucks. Kaminsky reached his first NBA Finals, but the Suns lost the series in six games to the Bucks.

On August 4, 2021, Kaminsky re-signed with the Suns on a one-year, $1.2 million deal. On November 10, Kaminsky scored a career-high 31 points in a 119–109 win over the Portland Trail Blazers. On November 21, he was diagnosed with a stress reaction in his right knee and was ruled out indefinitely. On January 6, 2022, Kaminsky underwent a procedure on his right knee and was ruled out for at least two months. On April 7, 2022, Kaminsky was waived.

=== Atlanta Hawks (2022–2023) ===
On July 12, 2022, Kaminsky signed a one-year deal with the Atlanta Hawks.

=== Houston Rockets (2023) ===
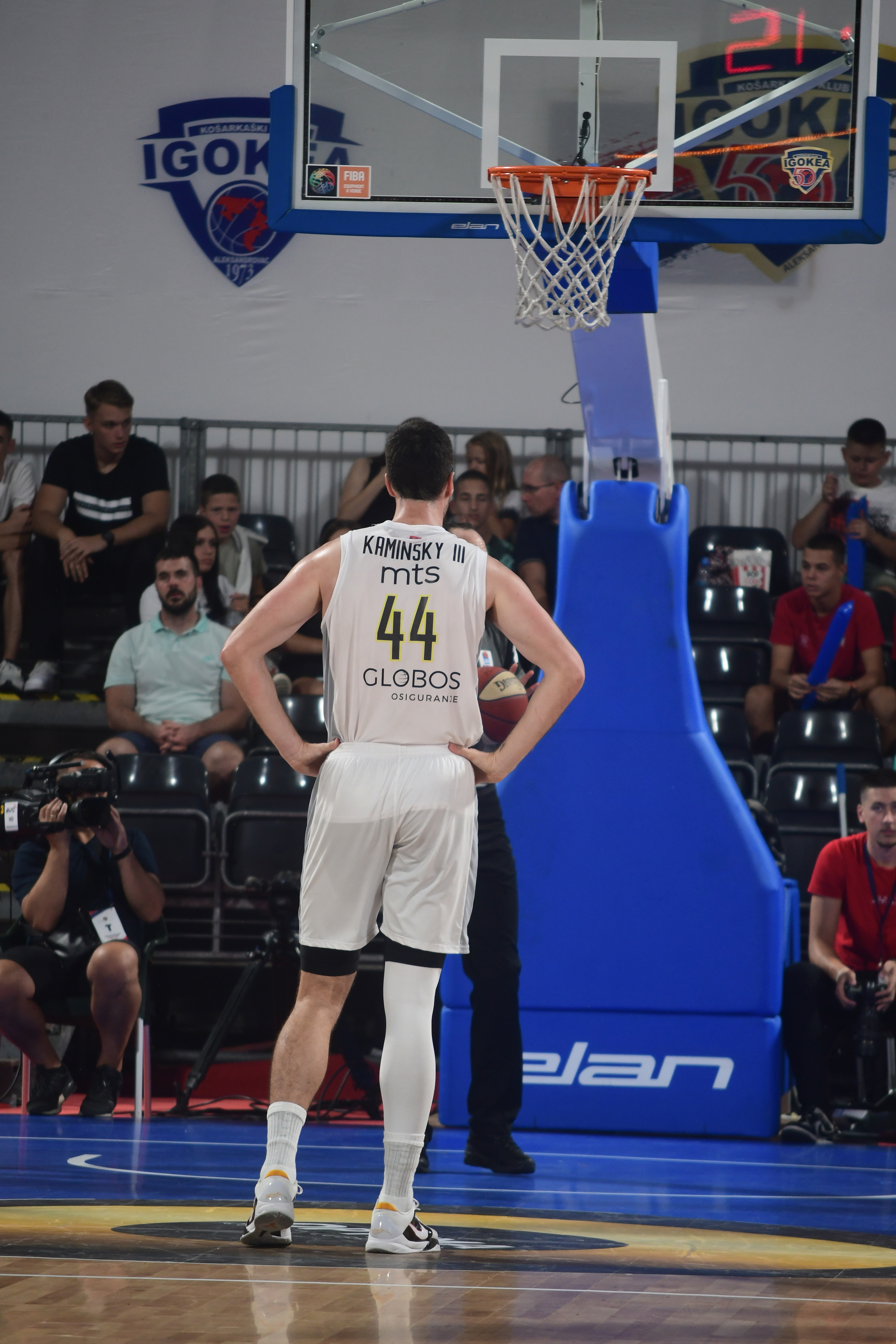
Kaminsky in 2023

On February 9, 2023, Kaminsky, Justin Holiday, and two future second-round draft picks were traded to the Houston Rockets in exchange for Bruno Fernando and Garrison Mathews.

=== Partizan (2023–2024) ===
On August 17, 2023, Kaminsky signed with Partizan of the Basketball League of Serbia, the Adriatic League and the EuroLeague. In the EuroLeague, he averaged 8.9 points, 3.4 rebounds and 1.6 assists per game. The season was deemed to be unsuccessful for Partizan as they finished the season without lifting any trophy.

=== Raptors 905 (2024–2025) ===
On September 26, 2024, Kaminsky signed with the Phoenix Suns, but was waived on October 19.

On December 16, 2024, Kaminsky signed with the Raptors 905. On March 16, 2025, it was announced that Kaminsky would miss the remainder of the season after undergoing arthroscopic knee surgery.

=== Alvark Tokyo (2025–present) ===
On October 7, 2025, during the pre-season game against the Spurs, Kaminsky made an appearance for Guangzhou Loong Lions.

On December 5, 2025, Kaminsky signed with Alvark Tokyo of the B.League.

== National team career ==
In November 2019, coach Igor Kokoškov announced that inviting Kaminsky to the Serbian national team was under consideration.

== Career statistics ==
Legend
| GP | Games played | GS | Games started | MPG | Minutes per game |
| FG% | Field-goal percentage | 3P% | 3-point field-goal percentage | FT% | Free-throw percentage |
| RPG | Rebounds per game | APG | Assists per game | SPG | Steals per game |
| BPG | Blocks per game | PPG | Points per game | PIR | Performance index rating |
| **Bold** | Career high |

=== NBA ===
==== Regular season ====
| Year | Team | GP | GS | MPG | FG% | 3P% | FT% | RPG | APG | SPG | BPG | PPG |
|---|---|---|---|---|---|---|---|---|---|---|---|---|
| 2015–16 | Charlotte | **81** | 3 | 21.1 | .410 | .337 | .730 | 4.1 | 1.2 | .5 | .5 | 7.5 |
| 2016–17 | Charlotte | 75 | **16** | **26.1** | .399 | .328 | .756 | 4.5 | **2.2** | .6 | .5 | **11.7** |
| 2017–18 | Charlotte | 79 | 4 | 23.2 | .429 | .380 | .799 | 3.6 | 1.6 | .5 | .2 | 11.1 |
| 2018–19 | Charlotte | 47 | 0 | 16.1 | .463 | .360 | .738 | 3.5 | 1.3 | .3 | .3 | 8.6 |
| 2019–20 | Phoenix | 39 | 13 | 19.9 | .450 | .331 | .678 | 4.5 | 1.9 | .4 | .3 | 9.7 |
| 2020–21 | Phoenix | 47 | 13 | 15.2 | .471 | .365 | .617 | 4.0 | 1.7 | .3 | .4 | 6.6 |
| 2021–22 | Phoenix | 9 | 0 | 20.1 | .545 | .333 | .900 | **4.6** | 1.4 | **.9** | **.8** | 10.6 |
| 2022–23 | Atlanta | 26 | 0 | 6.8 | **.568** | **.478** | .833 | 1.4 | .8 | .2 | .0 | 2.7 |
| 2022–23 | Houston | 10 | 0 | 5.9 | .316 | .200 | **1.000** | 1.6 | 1.1 | .1 | .3 | 1.8 |
| Career | | 413 | 49 | 19.8 | .430 | .349 | .746 | 3.8 | 1.6 | .4 | .4 | 8.8 |

==== Playoffs ====
| Year | Team | GP | GS | MPG | FG% | 3P% | FT% | RPG | APG | SPG | BPG | PPG |
|---|---|---|---|---|---|---|---|---|---|---|---|---|
| 2016 | Charlotte | 7 | **5** | **27.1** | .304 | **.294** | .810 | **4.3** | 1.1 | **.9** | **.7** | **7.1** |
| 2021 | Phoenix | **10** | 0 | 6.8 | **.455** | .200 | **1.000** | 1.4 | **1.4** | .2 | .3 | 2.2 |
| Career | | 17 | 5 | 15.2 | .353 | .273 | .818 | 2.6 | 1.3 | .5 | .5 | 4.2 |

=== EuroLeague ===
| Year | Team | GP | GS | MPG | FG% | 3P% | FT% | RPG | APG | SPG | BPG | PPG | PIR |
|---|---|---|---|---|---|---|---|---|---|---|---|---|---|
| 2023–24 | Partizan | 30 | 17 | 17.3 | .554 | .406 | .660 | 3.4 | 1.6 | .4 | .2 | 8.9 | 9.5 |
| Career | | 30 | 17 | 17.3 | .554 | .406 | .660 | 3.4 | 1.6 | .4 | .2 | 8.9 | 9.5 |

=== ABA League ===
| Year | Team | League | GP | MPG | FG% | 3P% | FT% | RPG | APG | SPG | BPG | PPG |
|---|---|---|---|---|---|---|---|---|---|---|---|---|
| 2023–24 | (Serbia) Partizan | ABA | 27 | 14.4 | .627 | .444 | .754 | 3.2 | 1.1 | .3 | .3 | 9.0 |

=== College ===
| Year | Team | GP | GS | MPG | FG% | 3P% | FT% | RPG | APG | SPG | BPG | PPG |
|---|---|---|---|---|---|---|---|---|---|---|---|---|
| 2011–12 | Wisconsin | 35 | 0 | 7.7 | .411 | .286 | .500 | 1.4 | .3 | .1 | .4 | 1.8 |
| 2012–13 | Wisconsin | 32 | 2 | 10.3 | .439 | .311 | .767 | 1.8 | .8 | .4 | .5 | 4.2 |
| 2013–14 | Wisconsin | 38 | 38 | 27.2 | .528 | .378 | .765 | 6.3 | 1.3 | .7 | **1.7** | 13.9 |
| 2014–15 | Wisconsin | **39** | **39** | **33.6** | **.547** | **.416** | **.780** | **8.2** | **2.6** | **.8** | 1.5 | **18.8** |
| Career | | 144 | 79 | 20.4 | .522 | .369 | .763 | 4.6 | 1.3 | .5 | 1.1 | 10.1 |

== Personal life ==
In July 2023, Kaminsky married sports journalist Ashley Brewer. They have one son together. Kaminsky is a Christian.
