= Karen Stack Umlauf =

American basketball coach

Career information
- High school: Oak Forest (Oak Forest, Illinois)
- College: Northwestern (1980–1983)
- Coaching career: 2018–2020

Career history

Coaching
- 2018–2020: Chicago Bulls (assistant)

Karen Stack Umlauf is a former executive and assistant coach of the National Basketball Association's Chicago Bulls.

Stack Umlauf was a standout basketball player for the Northwestern Wildcats in the early 1980s. After a year of playing basketball overseas, she joined the Bulls in 1985, starting with a role of selling tickets. Over the next decades, she rose to become director of basketball operations for 20 years and later senior director of basketball administration.

In 2017, she lobbied Bulls head of basketball operations John Paxson to let her coach. She was first assigned to the summer league. In so doing, she became the Bulls' first female assistant coach, combining that role with the role of director of team operations.

On October 12, 2020, the organization announced Stack Umlauf would not return to the coaching staff under newly hired head coach Billy Donovan.

== Personal life ==
Stack Umlauf is the sister of Jim Stack, a former scout and assistant general manager for the Bulls and later general manager of the Minnesota Timberwolves. She is also the aunt of NBA player Frank Kaminsky.
