= Jim Stack =

American basketball player and executive

Personal information
- Listed height: 6 ft 7 in (2.01 m)
- Listed weight: 215 lb (98 kg)

Career information
- High school: St. Laurence (Burbank, Illinois)
- College: Northwestern (1979–1983)
- NBA draft: 1983: 6th round, 117th overall pick
- Drafted by: Houston Rockets
- Position: Forward

Career history
- 1984–1985: GSG Aarschot
- 1985–1986: RAS Maccabi Brussels
- Stats at Basketball Reference

Jim Stack is an American basketball executive and former player. He served as general manager of the NBA's Minnesota Timberwolves from July 9, 2004, to September 26, 2009. Prior to joining the Timberwolves' organization, Stack worked as a scout and executive for the Chicago Bulls, an assistant coach for the Indiana Pacers and an advance scout for the New York Knicks.

== Early life ==
Stack attended St. Laurence High School in Burbank, Illinois. He was a member of the school's basketball team, the Vikings, which won or tied for the Chicago Catholic League championship for four consecutive years from 1975 to 1978. The Vikings finished in fourth place in the 1977 IHSA Class AA Boys Basketball tournament. Stack, however, was unable to play in the Vikings' semi-final and third-place games, which were both losses, in that year's tournament due to an ankle injury he suffered during the team's quarterfinal victory. In the 1977–1978 season, the Vikings won their first 27 games before losing 42–41 in the sectional round of the 1978 IHSA Class AA tournament to the also 27-0 and eventual state champions Lockport Township High School. Stack was named to the Illinois Basketball Coaches Association's All-State second team as a senior in 1978.

After graduating from high school, Stack played for Northwestern University. During his four years, he averaged 14.1 points-per-game and finished his career as the school's second all-time leading scorer with 1,583 points scored. Stack was selected as the team's MVP for his junior and senior years and helped the team advance to the second round of the 1983 National Invitation Tournament.

== Professional career ==
=== Europe ===
Stack was a sixth-round selection of the Houston Rockets in 1983, but ended up being one of the last cuts by the team that year. Stack then played overseas for a number of teams, including in Belgium where he played for GSG Aarschot in 1984–1985, averaging 27 points-per-game to finish third in the league in scoring, and RAS Maccabi Brussels in 1985–1986.

=== Chicago Bulls ===
In 1988, Stack was offered a position as scout with the Chicago Bulls by then General Manager Jerry Krause, also serving as a special assistant to Krause. Stack's contract as a scout with the Bulls was extended by the team in 1989 after Phil Jackson was named the team's new head coach. Stack was promoted to Assistant Vice President of Basketball operations in 1996. Stack played a significant part in the formation of the Bulls as a powerhouse in the 1990s when the team won six NBA championships in eight seasons.

=== Indiana Pacers ===
In August 2000, Stack was hired by the Indiana Pacers to serve as an assistant to head coach Isiah Thomas. Stack served as assistant coach for three seasons until Thomas was fired by the team in August 2003.

=== New York Knicks ===
Stack served as an advance scout for the New York Knicks during the 2003–2004 season.

=== Minnesota Timberwolves ===
Stack was hired to be the general manager of the Minnesota Timberwolves in July 2004. Stack was given a contract extension by the team in 2005, but was demoted to scout in September 2009.

== Personal life ==
Stack is the uncle of Frank Kaminsky who formerly played for the NBA's Phoenix Suns. Stack's sister Karen Stack Umlauf, who also played college basketball at Northwestern, began working for the Chicago Bulls in 1985 as an assistant for Jerry Krause and later the Senior Director of Basketball Administration for the team. She served as an assistant coach for the Bulls.

In September 2004, Stack was convicted of misdemeanor battery for his involvement in altercation with another man at a youth baseball game in Schaumburg, Illinois on July 4, 2004. Stack was sentenced to one-year court supervision and ordered to visit terminally ill children at a local hospital in December 2004 when the Timberwolves were scheduled to play the Bulls in Chicago.
