= GSG Aarschot =

Basketball club from the Belgian town of Aarschot

- Founded: 1954; 71 years ago
- History: Rimelago Basket Aarschot (1954–1980); BBC Toptours Aarschot (1980–1995); GSG Aarschot (2005–present)
- Arena: Sporthal Demervalei
- Capacity: 3,200
- Location: Aarschot, Belgium
- President: Geert Lowet
- Head coach: Ludo Faes
Home	Away

Gele Ster Gelrode Aarschot (in English: Yellow Star Gelrode Aarschot) is a basketball club from the Belgian town of Aarschot.

== History ==
The history of the club began in 1954 when Rimelago Basket Aarschot was founded. Initially Rimelago started in fourth provincial division. Aarschotse- club was promoted in a period of 25 years to a first class club. During its most successful period in the 70 Rimelago was six years not once defeated in his own room. Eventually made direct competitor Perron Liège, with the Canadian Robinson, gave an end to this record. In the early 80s the club was renamed BBC Toptours Aarschot.

Toptours Aarschot with the star players Tom Kropp and still residing in Aarschot Iba Sisokko was in the 80 top performers in a Belgian basketball. Every home game was attended by about 2,000 spectators. These were turbulent years of great successes were interspersed with dramatic periods. In 1995, the club with the basic number 797 went bankrupt after all.

In 2005, there finally came a merger between a lower provincial department playing Yellow Star Aarschot, Gelrode Aarschot and BBC. Since then, the association has 300 active members and over again is the Aarschotse basketball happen again present in the higher national rankings.

== Notable moments ==
- 1973: Arthur Foote is the first American player
- 1979 celebration of club's 25th anniversary with the promotion to Division I
- 1982: Aarschot took into the finals against the eternal rival Sunair Oostende. Aarschot lost 78-67.
- 1982: Aarschot, lost in the Belgian Cup final against Sunair Oostende
- 1984: First European game (1983–84 FIBA Korać Cup) against PAOK from Thessaloniki
- 1986: Relegation to Division II
- 1994: Celebration of club's 40th anniversary and return to Division I
- 1995: Failure of strain # 797
- 2005: Merger between BBC and GS Aarschot Gelrode
- 2007: GSG Aarschot promoted to Regional Division
- 2012: GSG Aarschot promoted to National Division
- The records highest score and biggest points difference in the Belgian first division status since 02.27.1982 in the name of Toptours Aarschot, which then won with 161-65 of Sint-Truiden.

== Honours ==
Belgian Cup

- Runners-up (1): 1981–82

== Tom Kropp ==
Tom Kropp is an athlete from the US state of Nebraska. Tom was a player who scored a lot. On average, he scored 32 points per game. After a stint at University of Nebraska at Kearney Kropp played for the NBA's Washington Bullets & Chicago Bulls. The latter was the team that later include stars such as Michael Jordan, Scottie Pippen and Dennis Rodman would play. After its passage in the NBA, he went to try his luck in Europe. During his last season in the BBC Aarschot, he decided to allow only one American in 1st National what Tom Kropp and Toptours was a blessing because Tom scored in his last season average up 35.1 points per game. A record that still stands on the tables.

== Notable players ==
- (United States) Paul Harding
- (Belgium) Iba Sissoko
- (Belgium) Johan Geleyns
- (United States) Loren Killion
- (United States) Bo Ellis
- (United States) Tom Kropp
- (United States) Corky Bell
- (United States) Ralph Garner
- (United States) Jim Stack
- (United States) Richard Johnson
- (United States) Tim Carr
- (United States) Ken Smith
- (Belgium) Cois Huysmans
- (Belgium) Polle Matthijs
- (Belgium) Jan Schellens
- (Belgium) Willy Lowet
- (Belgium) Ivo Torfs
- (United States) Gordie Herbert
- (United States) Dave Youdath
- (Belgium) Joost Hermans
- (Belgium) Raf Verbist
- (Belgium) Fons Matthijs
- (United States) Arthur Foote
- (Belgium) Rob Discart
- (Belgium) Jack Persy
