= 2023 Israeli Basketball National League Cup =

Sports season

Tournament details
- Country: Israel
- Dates: 11 January – March 2024
- Teams: 13

Final positions
- Champions: Elitzur Netanya
- Runners-up: Elitzur Shomron
- Semifinalists: Maccabi Ironi Ra'anana; Maccabi Haifa

Tournament statistics
- Matches played: 10

Awards
- MVP: Ilay Dolinski

The 2023 Israeli Basketball National League Cup was the 3rd edition of the Israeli Basketball National League Cup, organized by the Israel Basketball Association.

On 28 August 2023, the Israel Basketball Association held the draw for the tournament. The tournament format consists of one-game elimination match. The games originally scheduled for october-december 2023 was postponed for early 2024 due to the Gaza war.

== Brackets ==
Round of 16
27 January 2024, 20:30
Elitzur Shomron	81
Elitzur Eito Ashkelon	65
6 February 2024, 19:00
B.C. Safed	86
Maccabi Rishon LeZion	76
11 January 2024, 19:30
Hapoel Gilboa Galil	65
Ironi Nahariya	84
23 January 2024, 18:00
Hapoel Kafr Qasim	72
Maccabi Rehovot	75
26 January 2024, 19:00
Maccabi Haifa	98
Maccabi Ma'ale Adumim	75

Quarterfinals
13 February 2024, 19:00
Elitzur Shomron	94
B.C. Safed	90
13 February 2024, 19:00
Maccabi Ironi Ra'anana	97
Ironi Nahariya	87
13 February 2024, 19:30
Elitzur Netanya	91
Maccabi Rehovot	67
13 February 2024, 19:00
Maccabi Haifa	101
A.S. Ramat HaSharon	90

Semifinals
29 February 2024
Elitzur Shomron	80
Maccabi Ironi Ra'anana	71
29 February 2024
Elitzur Netanya	97
Maccabi Haifa	96

Final
12 March 2024
Elitzur Shomron	53
Elitzur Netanya	71

== Round of 16 ==
The round of 16 will take place on 28 August 2023. Maccabi Ironi Ra'anana, Elitzur Netanya and A.S. Ramat HaSharon automatically advanced to the quarterfinals.

23 January 2024	Hapoel Kafr Qasim	72–75	Maccabi Rehovot	Ramat Gan
18:30	Scoring by quarter: 21–22, 18–21, 18–13, 15–19
	Pts: Delaney 19; Rebs: Rosenberg 8 Asts: Harush 6 PIR: Delaney 21	Boxscore	Pts: Freund, Sharon 13; Rebs: Sharon 11; Asts: Ben David 6 PIR: Sharon 20	Arena: Zisman Hall; Attendance: 80

27 January 2024	Maccabi Haifa	98–75	Maccabi Ma'ale Adumim	Haifa
19:00	Scoring by quarter: 24–17, 19–21, 27–18, 28–19
	Pts: Bowman 24; Rebs: Bowman 9 Asts: Sasson 9 PIR: Bowman 35	Boxscore	Pts: Avneri 21; Rebs: Ben Akan 11; Asts: Noyovitch 7 PIR: Noyovitch 19	Arena: Assi Hall; Attendance: 60

27 January 2024	Elitzur Shomron	81–65	Elitzur Eito Ashkelon	Ganei Tikva
20:30	Scoring by quarter: 20–10, 23–20, 26–16, 12–19
	Pts: Druker 18; Rebs: Flaisher 13; Asts: Shulman 5 PIR: Shulman 23	Boxscore	Pts: Tishman 17; Rebs: Eisenhardt 7 Asts: Tishman 6 PIR: Tishman 22	Arena: Leader Sport Center

11 January 2024	Hapoel Gilboa Galil	65–84	Ironi Nahariya	Gan Ner
19:30	Scoring by quarter: 14–19, 20–23, 12–21, 19–21
	Pts: Baloul 19; Rebs: Guetta, Baloul 6 Asts: Davidi, Guetta 4 PIR: Baloul 21	Boxscore	Pts: Reuven 24; Rebs: Abaev 15; Asts: Tal 12; PIR: Abaev 32	Arena: Gan Ner Sports Hall; Attendance: 1,111

27 January 2024	B.C. Safed	86–78	Maccabi Rishon LeZion	Safed
19:30	Scoring by quarter: 28–12, 18–20, 20–19, 20–25
	Pts: Cohen 27; Rebs: Romanov 9 Asts: Glik 6 PIR: Cohen 32	Boxscore	Pts: Nesterenko 22; Rebs: Nesterenko 10; Asts: Kozahinof 10; PIR: Nesterenko	Arena: HaPais Hall; Attendance: 100

== Quarterfinals ==
13 February 2024	Elitzur Shomron	94–90(OT)	B.C. Safed	Ganei Tikva
19:00	Scoring by quarter: 17–20, 15–19, 22–24, 24–15, Overtime: 9–9, 7–3
	Pts: Coblin 26; Rebs: Flaisher 14; Asts: Flaisher 9 PIR: Coblin 25	Boxscore	Pts: Cohen 26; Rebs: Koperberg 11; Asts: Cohen 8 PIR: Koperberg 30	Arena: Leader Sport Center

13 February 2024	Maccabi Ironi Ra'anana	97–87	Ironi Nahariya	Ra'anana
19:00	Scoring by quarter: 31–13, 28–30, 16–20, 22–24
	Pts: Hai 33; Rebs: Atias 8 Asts: Vaslher 7 PIR: Hai 37	Boxscore	Pts: Reuven 26; Rebs: Chubrevich 13; Asts: Abaev 5 PIR: Reuven 25	Arena: Metro West; Attendance: 200

13 February 2024	Elitzur Netanya	91–67	Maccabi Rehovot	Netanya
19:30	Scoring by quarter: 18–20, 33–13, 31–14, 9–20
	Pts: Dolinski 21; Rebs: Dolinski 9 Asts: Saul, Shoham 5 PIR: Dolinski 27	Boxscore	Pts: Hadad 14; Rebs: Hadad 12; Asts: Abramovitch 8 PIR: Hadad 19	Arena: Yeshurun Hall; Attendance: 350

13 February 2024	Maccabi Haifa	101–90	A.S. Ramat HaSharon	Haifa
19:00	Scoring by quarter: 27–12, 29–27, 31–25, 14–26
	Pts: Alon 29; Rebs: Goldszten 7 Asts: Bowman 6 PIR: Alon 35	Boxscore	Pts: Elamashli 18; Rebs: Geffen, Elamashli 3 Asts: Gol, Geffen 5 PIR: Elamashli 21	Arena: Assi Hall; Attendance: 100

== Semifinals ==
29 February 2024	Maccabi Ironi Ra'anana	71–80	Elitzur Shomron	Ramla
17:45	Scoring by quarter: 18–20, 17–14, 16–15, 20–31
	Pts: Ohayon 13; Rebs: Sahar, Atias 7 Asts: Ohayon 9 PIR: Ohayon 16	Boxscore	Pts: Flaisher 16; Rebs: Flaisher 12; Asts: Shulman 9 PIR: Flaisher 30	Arena: Kiryat Menahem Arena

29 February 2024	Elitzur Netanya	97–96(OT)	Maccabi Haifa	Ramla
20:30	Scoring by quarter: 21–22, 31–22, 23–25, 11–17, Overtime: 11–10
	Pts: Poleg 29; Rebs: Gat 7 Asts: Poleg 7 PIR: Poleg 33	Boxscore	Pts: Bowman 22; Rebs: Bowman 14; Asts: Maman 6 PIR: Bowman 27	Arena: Kiryat Menahem Arena

== Final ==
12 March 2024	Elitzur Shomron	53–71	Elitzur Netanya	Hadera
	Scoring by quarter: 13–16, 13–20, 18–15, 9–20
	Pts: Flaisher 19; Rebs: Flaisher 7 Asts: Shulman 6 PIR: Flaisher 32	Boxscore	Pts: Dolinski 20; Rebs: Dolinski 12; Asts: Gat 4 PIR: Dolinski 32	Arena: Enerbox Arena

Starters:			Pts	Reb	Ast
C	8	(Israel) Ido Flaisher	19	14	0
G	1	(Israel) Shachar Doron	12	6	1
G	27	(Israel) Alon Druker	11	2	3
PG	11	(Israel) Eyal Shulman	5	5	6
FG	7	(Israel) Roi Behar	3	3	1
Reserves:					
G	0	(United States) Jordan Coblin	3	3	0
F	24	(Israel) Ilay Chen	0	2	0
F	47	(Israel) Alon Kremerman	0	0	0
G	4	(Israel) Niv Nachshon	0	0	0
F	14	(Israel) Aviv Shimoni	DNP		
C	32	(Israel) Emery Kagan	DNP		
	23	(Israel) Dan Schreier	DNP		
Head coach:
(Israel) Dror Cohen

E. Shomron	E. Netanya

E. Shomron	Statistics	E. Netanya
10/28 (35.7%)	2 point field goals	20/44 (45.5%)
7/29 (24.1%)	3 point field goals	8/31 (25.8%)
12/18 (66.7%)	Free throws	7/9 (77.8%)
38	Rebounds	48
11	Assists	15
3	Steals	7
14	Turnovers	8
3	Blocks	3

Starters:			Pts	Reb	Ast
SG	11	(Israel) Ariel Isaac	14	4	0
G	6	(Israel) Omer Poleg	9	6	4
F	15	(Israel) Imri Shavit	7	4	2
F/C	7	(Israel) Alon Michaeli	5	6	0
G	10	(Israel) Shoham Gat	4	3	5
Reserves:					
F	18	(Israel) Ilay Dolinski	20	12	2
	33	(Israel) Ilay Shaul	7	1	2
G	13	(Israel) Boris Bogoslavsky	3	4	0
F	25	(Israel) Ori Cohen	2	3	0
F/C	14	(Israel) Joshua Djanogly	0	0	0
PG	77	(Israel) Ilay Hayun	0	0	0
	16	(Israel) Noam Logshi	0	1	0
Head coach:
(Israel) Ruben Najberger

2023 National League Cup Winners
Elitzur Netanya
1st title
