= 2025–26 Israeli Basketball National League Cup =

Israeli sports tournament

Tournament details
- Country: Israel
- Dates: 8 January 2026 – 5 March 2026
- Teams: 16
- Defending champions: A.S. Ramat HaSharon

Tournament statistics
- Matches played: 15

The 2025–26 Israeli Basketball National League Cup was the 5th edition of the Israeli Basketball National League Cup, organized by the Israel Basketball Association. On 1 September 2025 the Israel Basketball Association decided to change the system for the National League Cup. All 16 teams will compete in Single-elimination tournament in an open draw.

== Brackets ==
Round of 16
16 January, 12:45
Ironi Nahariya (OT)	106
Otef Darom B.C.	105
16 January, 12:30
Maccabi Petah Tikva Elitzur	83
Maccabi Rehovot	70
17 January, 12:30
Elitzur Yavne	65
A.S. Ramat HaSharon	87
16 January, 12:45
Hapoel Haifa	80
Hapoel Migdal HaEmek/Jezreel	82
17 January, 20:30
S.C. Zafed	113
Maccabi Ma'ale Adumim	94
8 January, 17:30
Maccabi Haifa	82
Iron Eilat	87
17 January, 20:00
Maccabi Ashdod	85
A.S. Kiryat Gat/Ashkelon	99
17 January, 20:30
A.S. Ironi Ashkelon	92
Elitzur Shomron	78

Quarterfinals
27 February, 13:00
Ironi Nahariya	88
Maccabi Petah Tikva Elitzur	52
27 February, 12:30
A.S. Ramat HaSharon	102
Hapoel Migdal HaEmek/Jezreel	114
26 February, 18:30
S.C. Zafed	106
Iron Eilat	109
27 February, 13:15
A.S. Kiryat Gat/Ashkelon	69
A.S. Ironi Ashkelon	90

Semifinals
3 March
Ironi Nahariya
Hapoel Migdal HaEmek/Jezreel
3 March
Iron Eilat
A.S. Ironi Ashkelon

Final
5 March January, 18:30

== Round of 16 ==
The round of 16 will take place on 8, 16 and 17 January 2026.

8 January 2026	Maccabi Haifa	82–87	Iron Eilat	Haifa
17:30
				Arena: Romema Arena

16 January 2026	Ironi Nahariya	106–105	Otef Darom B.C.	Nahariya
12:45
				Arena: Ein Sara Sport Hall

16 January 2026	Maccabi Petah Tikva Elitzur	83–70	Maccabi Rehovot	Petah Tikva
12:30
				Arena: Rozmarin Sport Hall

16 January 2026	Hapoel Haifa	80–82	Hapoel Migdal HaEmek/Jezreel	Haifa
12:45
				Arena: Romema Arena

17 January 2026	Maccabi Ashdod	85–99	A.S. Kiryat Gat/Ashkelon	Ashdod
20:00
				Arena: HaKiriya Arena

17 January 2026	Elitzur Yavne	65–87	A.S. Ramat HaSharon	Yavne
20:30
				Arena: Ralf Klain Hall

17 January 2026	A.S. Ironi Ashkelon	92–78	Elitzur Shomron	Ashkelon
20:30
				Arena: Ashkelon Sport Arena

17 January 2026	S.C. Zafed	113–94	Maccabi Ma'ale Adumim	Zafed
20:30
				Arena: HaPais Hall Zafed

== Quarterfinals ==
The Quarterfinals will take place on 26 and 27 February 2026.

26 February 2026	S.C. Zafed	106–109	Iron Eilat	Zafed
18:30
				Arena: HaPais Hall Zafed

27 February 2026	A.S. Ramat HaSharon	102–114	Hapoel Migdal HaEmek/Jezreel	Ramat HaSharon
12:30
				Arena: Kiryat Yearim Hall

27 February 2026	Ironi Nahariya	88–52	Maccabi Petah Tikva Elitzur	Nahariya
13:00
				Arena: Ein Sara Sport Hall

27 February 2026	A.S. Kiryat Gat/Ashkelon	69–90	A.S. Ironi Ashkelon	Kiryat Gat
13:15
				Arena: Kramim Sport Hall
