= 2024–25 Israeli Basketball National League Cup =

Israeli sports tournament

Tournament details
- Country: Israel
- Dates: 18 January – 4 March 2025
- Teams: 14
- Defending champions: Elitzur Netanya

Final positions
- Champions: A.S. Ramat HaSharon
- Runners-up: Ironi Nahariya
- Semifinalists: Maccabi Ironi Ra'anana; Maccabi Rishon LeZion

Tournament statistics
- Matches played: 13

Awards
- MVP: (Israel) Amit Alon

The 2024–25 Israeli Basketball National League Cup was the 4th edition of the Israeli Basketball National League Cup, organized by the Israel Basketball Association.

On 30 July 2024 the Israel Basketball Association decided to change the system for the National League Cup. The two teams that finish the first round of the regular season at first and second place will automatically qualify for the quarterfinals. The remaining teams will compete in the preliminary round in an open draw. The draw was held on 2 January 2025.

== Brackets ==
Round of 16
17 January, 12:30
S.C. Safed | 79
Ironi Eilat | 86
18 January, 20:15
Hapoel Kfar Saba | 79
Maccabi Rehovot | 86
17 January, 13:00
Otef Darom BC | 96
Hapoel Bnei Kafr Qasim | 103
18 January, 20:00
Maccabi Rishon LeZion | 89
Elitzur Yavne | 73
18 January, 20:30
Elitzur Shomron | 95
A.S. Elitzur Ashkelon | 77
18 January, 20:00
Hapoel Migdal HaEmek/Jezreel | 60
Ironi Nahariya | 92

Quarterfinals
5 February, 19:00
Ironi Eilat | 93
A.S. Ramat HaSharon | 98
4 February, 19:00
Maccabi Rehovot | 85
Maccabi Ironi Ra'anana | 92
5 February, 19:30
Hapoel Bnei Kafr Qasim | 72
Maccabi Rishon LeZion | 100
4 February, 19:00
Elitzur Shomron | 67
Ironi Nahariya | 84

Semifinals
26 February, 18:30
A.S. Ramat HaSharon | 83
Maccabi Ironi Ra'anana | 71
26 February, 21:00
Maccabi Rishon LeZion | 81
Ironi Nahariya | 84

Final
4 March 2024, 19:00
A.S. Ramat HaSharon | 74
Ironi Nahariya | 69

== Round of 16 ==
The round of 16 will take place on 18 January 2025. Maccabi Ironi Ra'anana and A.S. Ramat HaSharon automatically advanced to the quarterfinals.

| 17 January | F.C. Safed | 79–86 | Iron Eilat | Safed |
| 12:30 | Scoring by quarter: 11–22, 19–19, 20–30, 29–15 |
| | Pts: Burke 20; Rebs: Koperberg 14; Asts: Fairell 11; PIR: Rosenberg 17 | Boxscore | Pts: Hannahs 30; Rebs: Graham 8 Asts: Gutt 5 PIR: Hannahs 27 | Arena: HaPais Hall Safed |

| 17 January | Otef Darom BC | 96–103 | Hapoel Bnei Kafr Qasim | Kibbutz Magen |
| 13:00 | Scoring by quarter: 24–32, 19–24, 22–19, 31–28 |
| | Pts: Cole 36; Rebs: Cole, Mintz 7 Asts: Abouloff 6 PIR: Cole 38 | Boxscore | Pts: Corbett 23; Rebs: Corbett 13; Asts: Sade 6 PIR: Corbett 30 | Arena: Rotem Hall |

| 18 January | Maccabi Rishon LeZion | 89–73 | Elitzur Yavne | Rishon LeZion |
| 20:00 | Scoring by quarter: 26–10, 12–19, 27–24, 24–20 |
| | Pts: Grant 24; Rebs: Grant 10; Asts: Grant 7 PIR: Grant 31 | Boxscore | Pts: Malkov 16; Rebs: Gipson 6 Asts: Gilinski 12; PIR: Gilinski 19 | Arena: Beit Maccabi |

| 18 January | Hapoel Kfar Saba | 79–86 | Maccabi Rehovot | Kfar Saba |
| 20:15 | Scoring by quarter: 21–20, 23–25, 18–24, 17–17 |
| | Pts: Levi 18; Rebs: Levi 13; Asts: Three players 3 PIR: Levi 29 | Boxscore | Pts: Peled 25; Rebs: Sharon 9 Asts: Veshler 7 PIR: Peled 29 | Arena: HaYovel |

| 18 January | Elitzur Shomron | 95–77 | A.S Elitzur Ashkelon | Ganei Tikva |
| 20:30 | Scoring by quarter: 28–24, 27–20, 16–20, 24–13 |
| | Pts: Abell 23; Rebs: Shimoni, Zabelin 9 Asts: Goldman 6 PIR: Abell 34 | Boxscore | Pts: Canty 26; Rebs: Canty 6 Asts: Najar 13; PIR: Canty 31 | Arena: Leader Sport Center |

| 18 January | Hapoel Migdal HaEmek/Jezreel | 90–92 | Ironi Nahariya | Migdal HaEmek |
| 20:00 | Scoring by quarter: 19–24, 27–23, 16–24, 28–21 |
| | Pts: Lavy 21; Rebs: Fuxman 8 Asts: Menachem 12; PIR: Fuxman 23 | Boxscore | Pts: Binyamin 20; Rebs: Yussuf, Levinson 7 Asts: Shaul, Binyamin 7 PIR: Binyamin 27 | Arena: Yearot HaEmek Hall |

== Quarterfinals ==
| 5 February | Iron Eilat | 93–98 | A.S. Ramat HaSharon | Eilat |
| 19:00 | Scoring by quarter: 29–13, 20–30, 17–23, 27–32 |
| | Pts: Gutt 22; Rebs: Porat 7 Asts: Gutt, Williams 5 PIR: Eisendorf 24 | Boxscore | Pts: Lee 25; Rebs: Lee 9 Asts: Williams 11; PIR: Lee 33 | Arena: Begin Arena |

| 5 February | Hapoel Bnei Kafr Qasim | 72–100 | Maccabi Rishon LeZion | Kafr Qasim |
| 19:30 | Scoring by quarter: 18–23, 24–12, 15–42, 15–23 |
| | Pts: Bash 16; Rebs: Bash 8 Asts: Boneh 5 PIR: Bash 17 | Boxscore | Pts: Burns 26; Rebs: Nekrashevich 6 Asts: Grant 7 PIR: Burns, Grant 28 | Arena: Sport Hall |

| 4 February | Maccabi Rehovot | 85–92 | Maccabi Ironi Ra'anana | Rehovot |
| 19:00 | Scoring by quarter: 19–24, 22–26, 17–29, 27–13 |
| | Pts: Anthony 17; Rebs: Sharon 10; Asts: Anthony 6 PIR: Anthony 18 | Boxscore | Pts: Wideman 15; Rebs: Moshe; Asts: Wideman 7 PIR: Wideman 24 | Arena: Barzilai Sports-Center |

| 4 February | Elitzur Shomron | 67–84 | Ironi Nahariya | Ganei Tikva |
| 19:00 | Scoring by quarter: 9–23, 22–19, 21–21, 15–21 |
| | Pts: Weissmann 14; Rebs: Cohen 9 Asts: Goldman, Shimoni 4 PIR: Zabelin 20 | Boxscore | Pts: Binyamin, Levinson 19; Rebs: Levinson 16; Asts: Levinson 7 PIR: Levinson 38 | Arena: Leader Sport Center |

== Semifinals ==
| 26 February | A.S. Ramat HaSharon | 83–71 | Maccabi Ironi Ra'anana | Netanya Arena |
| 18:30 | Scoring by quarter: 24–10, 19–15, 18–22, 22–24 |
| | Pts: Williams 24; Rebs: Lee 14; Asts: Williams, Alon 4 PIR: Lee 34 | Boxscore | Pts: Wideman 17; Rebs: Hall 11; Asts: Three players 3 PIR: Hall 18 | Arena: Netanya |

| 26 February | Maccabi Rishon LeZion | 81–84 | Ironi Nahariya | Netanya Arena |
| 21:00 | Scoring by quarter: 14–21, 20–28, 20–16, 27–19 |
| | Pts: Grant 36; Rebs: Grant 11; Asts: Grant 6 PIR: Grant 50 | Boxscore | Pts: Frazier 24; Rebs: Yussuf 13; Asts: Levinson 6 PIR: Yussuf 32 | Arena: Netanya |

== Final ==
| 4 March | A.S. Ramat HaSharon | 74–69 | Ironi Nahariya | Netanya Arena |
| 19:00 | Scoring by quarter: 23–15, 15–17, 12–19, 24–18 |
| | Pts: Three players 14; Rebs: Lee 15; Asts: Williams 7 PIR: Lee 27 | Boxscore | Pts: Yussuf 17; Rebs: Yussuf 9 Asts: Yussuf, Davidi 3 PIR: Yussuf 28 | Arena: Netanya |

| Starters: | | | Pts | Reb | Ast |
|---|---|---|---|---|---|
| PG | 47 | (United States) Akaemji Williams | 14 | 3 | 7 |
| F | 44 | (United States) Ira Lee | 14 | 15 | 3 |
| C | 13 | (Israel) Amit Bier-Katz | 12 | 6 | 2 |
| SF | 8 | (Israel) Hen Halfon | 8 | 3 | 2 |
| G | 45 | (Israel) Omer Shefer | 3 | 1 | 0 |
| Reserves: | | | | | |
| PG | 6 | (Israel) Amit Alon | 14 | 4 | 4 |
| F | 25 | (Israel) Roe Avneri | 9 | 1 | 0 |
| PG | 4 | (Israel) Rany Belaga | 0 | 5 | 1 |
| G | 10 | (Israel) Daniel Reuven | 0 | 0 | 0 |
| C | 3 | (Israel) Eitan Drut | DNP | | |
| G/F | 99 | (Israel) Yuval Hochsteter | DNP | | |
| F | 7 | (Israel) Aviv Aronov | DNP | | |
Head coach:
(Israel) Guy Kantor

| A.S. Ramat HaSharon | I. Nahariya |

| A.S. Ramat HaSharon | Statistics | I. Nahariya |
|---|---|---|
| 24/41 (58.5%) | 2 point field goals | 16/38 (42.1%) |
| 5/26 (19.2%) | 3 point field goals | 7/22 (31.8%) |
| 11/18 (61.1%) | Free throws | 16/25 (64.0%) |
| 46 | Rebounds | 35 |
| 19 | Assists | 14 |
| 11 | Steals | 13 |
| 18 | Turnovers | 16 |
| 3 | Blocks | 3 |

| Starters: | | | Pts | Reb | Ast |
|---|---|---|---|---|---|
| C | 1 | (United States) Temidayo Yussuf | 17 | 9 | 3 |
| G | 11 | (Israel) Ido Davidi | 16 | 5 | 3 |
| PG | 23 | (United States) Tim Frazier | 13 | 1 | 2 |
| F/C | 22 | (Israel) Tomer Levinson | 12 | 4 | 1 |
| SG | 26 | (Israel) Yanir Binyamin | 7 | 1 | 2 |
| Reserves: | | | | | |
| | 33 | (Israel) Ilay Shaul | 2 | 3 | 2 |
| C | 7 | (Israel) Alexey Chubrevich | 2 | 3 | 1 |
| PG | 21 | (Israel) Danel Kozahinof | 0 | 1 | 0 |
| G | 13 | (Israel) Rom Hitkes | 0 | 0 | 0 |
| F | 8 | (Israel) Ofek Ben-Yakov | 0 | 0 | 0 |
| PF | 18 | (Israel) Amit Cohen | DNP | | |
| | 24 | (Israel) Nitai Tepperberg | DNP | | |
Head coach:
(Israel) Offer Rahimi

2024–25 National League Cup Winners
A.S. Ramat HaSharon
1st title
