= 2016–17 Israeli Basketball State Cup =

Basketball tournament

Israeli Basketball State Cup
- Season: 2016–17
- Games played: 25
- Teams: 26

Finals
- Champions: Maccabi Tel Aviv (44th title)
- Runners-up: Hapoel Jerusalem
- Finals MVP: (Israel) Gal Mekel

The 2016–17 Israeli Basketball State Cup was the 57th edition of the Israeli Basketball State Cup, organized by the Israel Basketball Association. Maccabi Tel Aviv won its 44th State Cup title after beating Hapoel Jerusalem in the final.

== First round ==
Maccabi Tel Aviv, Maccabi Rishon LeZion, Maccabi Haifa, Maccabi Ashdod, Bnei Herzliya and Ironi Nes Ziona were pre-qualified for the round of 16 and did not have to play in the first round.

Home team	Score	Away team
Maccabi Hod HaSharon	77–109	Hapoel Eilat
Hapoel Ramat Gan	54–94	Hapoel Tel Aviv
Ironi Ramat Gan	62–100	Ironi Nahariya
A.S. Ramat HaSharon	56–80	Hapoel Gilboa Galil
Hapoel Galil Elyon	60–94	Hapoel Holon
Hapoel Haifa	71–83	Maccabi Rehovot
Elitzur Kiryat Ata	94–85	Hapoel Afula/Gilboa
Hapoel Migdal HaEmek	57–94	Hapoel Jerusalem
Maccabi Ra'anana	80–74	Maccabi Kiryat Gat
Hapoel Be'er Sheva B.C.	73–68	Hapoel Kfar Saba

== Round of 16 ==
Home team	Score	Away team
Maccabi Ra'anana	60–76	Maccabi Ashdod
Hapoel Tel Aviv	74–78	Hapoel Jerusalem
Maccabi Tel Aviv	77–76	Hapoel Gilboa Galil
Hapoel Holon	91–70	Hapoel Eilat
Maccabi Rehovot	63–65	Bnei Herzliya
Hapoel Be'er Sheva B.C.	104–96	Maccabi Rishon LeZion
Ironi Nes Ziona	76–66	Ironi Nahariya
Elitzur Kiryat Ata	54–91	Maccabi Haifa

== Quarterfinals ==
Home team	Score	Away team
Hapoel Jerusalem	68–56	Bnei Herzliya
Maccabi Ashdod	95–90	Maccabi Haifa
Hapoel Be'er Sheva B.C.	80–88	Hapoel Holon
Ironi Nes Ziona	73–75	Maccabi Tel Aviv

== Final four ==
=== Bracket ===
Semifinals; 13 February
Hapoel Jerusalem	68
Hapoel Holon	59
Maccabi Ashdod	89
Maccabi Tel Aviv	95

Final; 16 February
Hapoel Jerusalem	68
Maccabi Tel Aviv	82

=== Semifinals ===
February 13, 2017	Maccabi Tel Aviv	95–89	Maccabi Ashdod	Pais Arena, Jerusalem
	Pts: Rudd 20		Pts: Carmichael 22

February 13, 2017	Hapoel Jerusalem	68–59	Hapoel Holon	Pais Arena, Jerusalem
	Pts: Kinsey 18		Pts: Atkins 19

=== Final ===
February 16, 2017	Maccabi Tel Aviv	82–68	Hapoel Jerusalem	Pais Arena, Jerusalem
	Pts: Mekel, Goudelock 15; Rebs: Iverson 10; Asts: Ohayon 5	Report	Pts: Stoudemire 15; Rebs: Eliyahu 8 Asts: Jerrells 5

2017 Israeli State Cup Winners
Maccabi Tel Aviv B.C.
(44th title)

== See also ==
- 2016–17 Israeli Basketball Super League
