= Israeli Basketball Leumit Cup =

- Founded: 2021; 5 years ago
- First season: 2021
- Country: Israel
- Confederation: FIBA Europe
- Number of teams: 13
- Current champions: A.S. Ramat HaSharon (1st title) (2022)
- Most championships: A.S. Ramat HaSharon, Hapoel Afula, Ironi Nahariya, Elitzur Netanya (1 title)
- Website: ibasketball.co.il
- 2024–25 Israeli Basketball National League Cup

Israeli Basketball Leumit Cup (Hebrew: גביע הליגה הלאומית) is the cup competition for the teams from the Liga Leumit, the second tier level of basketball competition in Israel.

== Background ==
The tournament was first established in 2021-2022 season after that the Israeli Basketball Association announcement for a change on the format State Cup When only the first eight teams at the end of the first half of the regular season from the Israeli Basketball Premier League participate.

== Finals ==
Season	Winner	Score	Runners-up	MVP	Ref
2021	Hapoel Afula	96–78	Elitzur Eito Ashkelon	(United States) Vander Blue (31)	
2022	Ironi Nahariya	87–82	Elitzur Eito Ashkelon	(United States) (Israel) Isaiah Eisendorf (24)	
2023	Elitzur Netanya	71–53	Elitzur Shomron	(Israel) Ilay Dolinski (21)	
2024–25	A.S. Ramat HaSharon	74–69	Ironi Nahariya	(Israel) Amit Alon (14)	
