= Eyal Shulman =

Israeli basketball player

Eyal Shulman אייל שולמן
No. 11 – Elitzur Shomron
- Position: Point guard

Personal information
- Born: September 17, 1987 (age 38) Givatayim, Israel
- Listed height: 6 ft 4 in (1.93 m)

Career highlights
- Israeli Basketball Premier League Most Improved Player (2013)

Eyal Shulman (Hebrew: אייל שולמן; born September 17, 1987) is an Israeli basketball player for Elitzur Shomron, who plays the point guard position. He was named the 2013 Israeli Basketball Premier League Most Improved Player.

== Biography ==
Shulman was born in Givatayim, Israel. He is 6' 4" tall (193 cm).

He played in the 2011 Summer Universiade.

Shulman has played previously for Maccabi Rishon Lezion, GreenTops Netanya, Ironi Nahariya, Hapoel Holon, Maccabi Kiryat Gat, and Hapoel Tel Aviv. He was named the 2013 Israeli Basketball Premier League Most Improved Player.
