= Ben Eisenhardt =

American-Israeli basketball player

Ben Eisenhardt בן אייזנהארט
No. 2 – Maccabi Rehovot
- Position: Center / power forward
- League: Liga Leumit

Personal information
- Born: December 3, 1990 (age 35) Bainbridge Island, Washington, U.S.
- Listed height: 6 ft 10 in (2.08 m)
- Listed weight: 216 lb (98 kg)

Career information
- High school: Bainbridge (Bainbridge Island, Washington)
- College: Cal Poly (2010–2011); Whitman (2011–2014)
- NBA draft: 2014: undrafted
- Playing career: 2014–present

Career history
- 2014–2015: Elitzur Yavne
- 2015–2016: Maccabi Ashdod
- 2016–2023: Hapoel Be'er Sheva
- 2024–2026: Maccabi Rishon Lezion
- 2026–present: Maccabi Rehovot

Benjamin Grant Eisenhardt (Hebrew: בן אייזנהארט; December 3, 1990) is an American-Israeli professional basketball player for Maccabi Rehovot of the Liga Leumit. He usually plays as a center or power forward.

== Personal life ==
Eisenhardt was born in Bainbridge Island, Washington, and is Jewish. He is 6' 10" tall (208 cm), and weighs 216 pounds (98 kg). He made aliyah, becoming an Israeli citizen.

== Basketball career ==
Eisenhardt attended Bainbridge High School. He averaged 12 points per game and seven rebounds per game as a senior.

As a freshman in 2010–11, Eisenhardt played basketball for California Polytechnic State University.

He attended Whitman College, playing for the Missionaries, and graduated in 2014. As a junior in 2012–13 Eisenhardt led the Northwest Conference (NWC) in scoring (442 points), was 4th in conference scoring average (16.4 ppg.) and field goal percentage (54.9%), and was 7th in rebounding (6.2 per game). He became the first Missionary to be named to the National Association of Basketball Coaches Division 3 All-American Third-Team as a junior, and was selected to the D3Hoops.com All-Region Team, and named NWC Player of the Year and First Team All-NWC. In his senior season, he missed a significant number of games with concussion symptoms.

Eisenhardt plays for Hapoel Be'er Sheva of the Israeli Basketball Premier League, at the power forward/center positions.
