= Brandon Bowman =

American basketball player (born 1984)

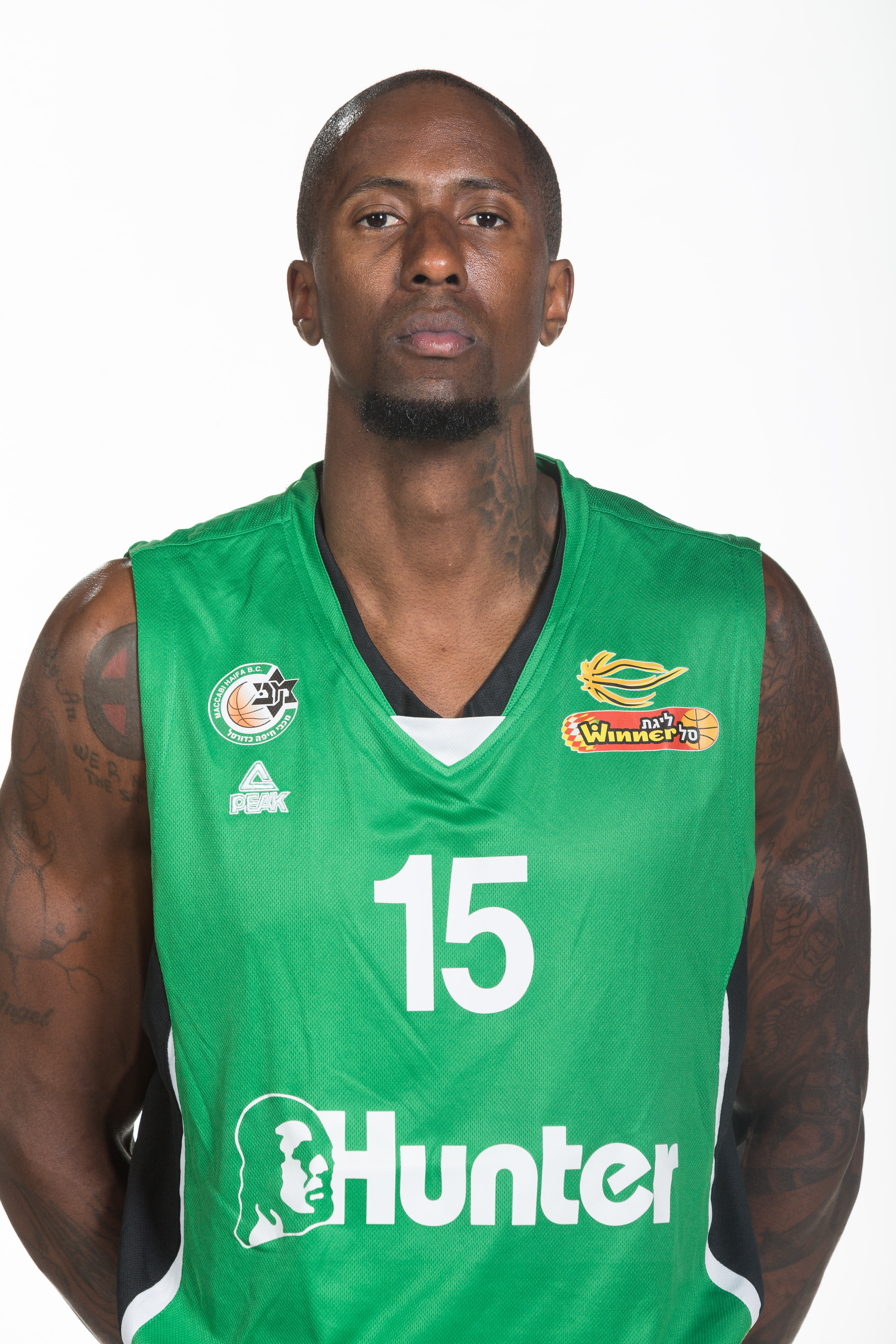
- Bowman with Maccabi Haifa in 2017

No. 15 – Elitzur Yavne
- Position: Power forward / center
- League: Liga Leumit

Personal information
- Born: October 15, 1984 (age 42) Beverly Hills, California
- Listed height: 6 ft 9 in (2.06 m)
- Listed weight: 223 lb (101 kg)

Career information
- High school: Westchester (Los Angeles, California)
- College: Georgetown (2002–2006)
- NBA draft: 2006: undrafted
- Playing career: 2006–present

Career history
- 2006–2008: Bakersfield Jam
- 2008: Ignis Novara
- 2008–2009: Telekom Bonn
- 2009–2010: Tofaş
- 2010–2011: Lukoil Academic
- 2011: Le Mans
- 2011: FMP Železnik
- 2011–2012: Maccabi Rishon LeZion
- 2012: Wonju Dongbu Promy
- 2012: Seoul Samsung Thunders
- 2013: Hapoel Gilboa Galil
- 2013–2014: Rasta Vechta
- 2014: Wellington Saints
- 2014–2015: Medi Bayreuth
- 2015: Atenienses de Manatí
- 2015–2016: AEK Larnaca
- 2016–2017: Spirou Charleroi
- 2017: Maccabi Kiryat Gat
- 2017: Fujian Lightning
- 2017–2018: Maccabi Haifa
- 2019: Maccabi Rehovot
- 2019: Hawke's Bay Hawks
- 2019–2020: Kagawa Five Arrows
- 2020: Panionios
- 2020–2022: Gießen 46ers
- 2023–2025: Maccabi Haifa
- 2025–2026: Elitzur Ashkelon
- 2026–present: Elitzur Yavne

Career highlights
- Cypriot League champion (2016); NZNBL champion (2014); NZNBL All-Star Five (2019); 2× Israeli League All-Star (2012, 2018); TBL All-Star (2010); Third-team All-Big East (2005)

Brandon Kyle Bowman (born October 15, 1984) is an American professional basketball player for Elitzur Yavne of the Israeli Liga Leumit. He played college basketball at Georgetown University where he played primarily at the small forward position under coach John Thompson III. Bowman was a preseason candidate for the 2006 John R. Wooden Award for the best collegiate men's basketball player.

== High school career ==
Bowman attended Westchester High School in Westchester, California, where he averaged 14 points and eight rebounds while leading his team to a 32–2 record, the California State Division I-A Championship, and a USA Today No. 1 ranking in his senior year. Bowman was a member of the 2002 USA Team at the International Albert Schweitzer Youth Basketball Tournament in Mannheim, Germany.

== Collegiate career ==
Bowman was a third-team all-Big East Conference selection in his junior year. He was the team's leading scorer (15.1 ppg) and second leading rebounder (6.1 rpg). After declaring for the NBA draft, he withdrew his name from the candidates' list. He went back to Georgetown, rejoining senior standouts Ashanti Cook and Darrel Owens, and closed his collegiate career with 11 points and 5.2 rebounds per game, distinguishing himself particularly during the Hoyas' upset over the then undefeated #1 Duke Blue Devils, in which he scored 23 points and grabbed 8 rebounds.

== Professional career ==
=== 2006–07 season ===
After going undrafted in the 2006 NBA draft, Bowman joined the Portland Trail Blazers for the 2006 NBA Summer League. On October 2, 2006, he signed with the New Jersey Nets. However, he was later waived by the Nets on October 19, 2006.

On November 2, 2006, he was selected with the 11th overall pick by the Bakersfield Jam in the 2006 NBA D-League draft.

=== 2007–08 season ===
In July 2007, Bowman joined the Los Angeles Clippers for the 2007 NBA Summer League. In October 2007, he was re-acquired by the Bakersfield Jam. On January 2, 2008, he terminated his contract with the Jam. The next day, he signed with Basket Draghi Novara of Italy for the rest of the season.

=== 2008–09 season ===
In July 2008, Bowman joined the New Orleans Hornets for the 2008 NBA Summer League. In August 2008, he signed with Telekom Baskets Bonn of Germany for the 2008–09 season.

=== 2009–10 season ===
In September 2009, Bowman signed with the Philadelphia 76ers. However, he was later waived by the 76ers on October 21, 2009.

On November 17, 2009, he signed with Tofaş Bursa of Turkey for rest of the 2009–10 season.

=== 2010–11 season ===
In July 2010, Bowman joined the Charlotte Bobcats for the 2010 NBA Summer League. He later signed with Lukoil Academic of Bulgaria for the 2010–11 season. On January 25, 2011, he left Lukoil Academic and signed a six-week contract with Le Mans of France as an injury replacement for Alain Koffi. In March 2011, he left Le Mans and signed with FMP Železnik of Serbia for the rest of the season.

=== 2011–12 season ===
On August 1, 2011, Bowman signed with Maccabi Rishon LeZion of Israel for the 2011–12 season.

=== 2012–13 season ===
In July 2012, Bowman was selected with the ninth overall pick by Wonju Dongbu Promy in the 2012 Korean Basketball League draft. In October 2012, he was traded to the Seoul Samsung Thunders. In November 2012, he was released by the Thunders after just 4 games.

On January 12, 2013, he signed with Hapoel Gilboa Galil of Israel. On February 19, 2013, he was released by Galil Gilboa.

=== 2013–14 season ===
On November 22, 2013, Bowman signed with SC Rasta Vechta of Germany for the rest of the 2013–14 season.

On May 13, 2014, he signed with the Wellington Saints for the rest of the 2014 New Zealand NBL season. On May 23, 2014, he made his debut for the Saints. In just under 26 minutes of action, he recorded 22 points, 8 rebounds, 2 assists and 2 steals in a 111–114 loss to the Super City Rangers.

=== 2014–15 season ===
On June 24, 2014, he signed with Medi Bayreuth of Germany for the 2014–15 season.

On June 19, 2015, he signed a one-month deal with Atenienses de Manatí of Puerto Rico.

=== 2015–16 season ===
On December 12, 2015, he signed with AEK Larnaca of Cyprus for the 2015–16 season.

=== 2016–17 season ===
On October 5, 2016, he signed with Spirou Charleroi of Belgium for the 2016–17 season. On January 11, 2017, he parted ways with Charleroi. The next day, he signed with Israeli club Maccabi Kiryat Gat.

=== 2017–18 season ===
On August 28, 2017, he signed a two-year deal with the Israeli team Maccabi Haifa. On October 23, 2017, Bowman recorded a career-high 30 points, including a buzzer-beating three-point shot to send the game into overtime, in an 89–85 win over Ironi Nes Ziona, and later was named Israeli League Round 3 MVP.

=== 2018–19 season ===
On January 26, 2019, he signed with Maccabi Rehovot of the Liga Leumit for the rest of the season.

In May 2019, Bowman joined the Hawke's Bay Hawks for the rest of the 2019 New Zealand NBL season.

=== 2020–21 season ===
On September 7, 2020, Bowman signed with Gießen 46ers of the Basketball Bundesliga.

=== 2023–present seasons ===
Bowman plays for Maccabi Haifa of the Israeli Liga Artzit.

== Personal ==
Bowman is the son of Tom and Sharon Bowman, and has three brothers Tom, Stephan and Zach and one sister, Nicole. He is also the cousin of former NBA players Antoine and Samaki Walker.
