= Ari Rosenberg =

Israeli basketball player

Ari Rosenberg ארי רוזנברג
Personal information
- Born: May 8, 1964 (age 62) Montreal, Quebec, Canada
- Listed height: 1.90 m (6 ft 3 in)

Career information
- College: Tel Aviv University (LL.B.)
- Position: Guard

Career highlights
- 1985 Maccabiah Games; silver medal

Ariel Rosenberg (Hebrew: ארי רוזנברג; born May 8, 1964) is an Israeli former basketball player. He played the guard position. He played in the Israeli Premier Basketball League and on the Israel national basketball team, and won a silver medal at the 1985 Maccabiah Games. He is now an attorney.

== Biography ==
Rosenberg was born in Montreal, Quebec. He received a Bachelor of Laws (LL.B.) from Tel Aviv University. He is 1.90 m tall.

He played in the Israeli Premier Basketball League for Maccabi Haifa, Ramat Hasharon, Hapoel Gvat, Hapoel Eilat, and Hapoel Tel Aviv. Rosenberg also played on the Israel national basketball team, and competed in the 1981 European Championship for Cadets, 1986 World Championship for Men, 1987 European Championship for Men, and 1988 European Olympic Qualifying Tournament for Men.

Rosenberg played basketball for Team Israel in the 1985 Maccabiah Games, where it won a silver medal.

He is a lawyer with the law firm of ROSAK (Rosenberg Abramovich Schneller, Advocates), established by Canadian immigrant to Israel George Rosenberg in 1969, which he joined in 1997. He is head of its Corporate & Commercial Law, Taxation, and International Wealth Planning for Private Clients practices.
