= Ironi Nahariya =

Ironi Rain Nahariya
- Leagues: Liga Leumit; Balkan League
- Founded: 1970; 56 years ago
- History: Hapoel Nahariya (1970–2006); Iscar Nahariya (2007–2008); Ironi Nahariya (2008–present)
- Arena: Ein Sara Sport Hall
- Capacity: 2,500
- Location: Nahariya, Israel
- Team colors: Purple, white
- CEO: (Israel) Dudu Lamberg
- President: (Israel) Nissim Alfasi
- General manager: (Israel) Roy Schilling
- Head coach: (Israel) Ruven Najberger
- Website: ironinahariya.com
Home	Away

Ironi Nahariya Basketball Club (Hebrew: מועדון הכדורסל עירוני נהריה) known for sponsorship reasons as Ironi Rain Nahariya (עירוני גשם נהריה) is a professional basketball club based in city of Nahariya in northern Israel. The team plays in the Liga Leumit (the second tier of Israeli basketball) and internationally in the Balkan International Basketball League. The team currently plays in the Ein Sara Sport Hall, which is home to 2,500 spectators.

== History ==
=== 1970s-1990s ===
Ironi Nahariya was founded originally as Hapoel Nahariya in 1970. The club originally supported orange and blue as its main colors. From 1970 to 1992, the club played in the lower leagues of Israeli Basketball. The 1991–92 National League season saw Hapoel Nahariya achieve promotion to the Premier League for the first time in club history. Their stay was short-lived as the club was relegated at the end of the 1993–94 season. The club would end up getting relegated again to the third tier at the end of the 1995–96 season.

=== 2000s ===
Hapoel Nahariya would achieve promotion back to the National League at the end of the 1999–2000 season. The 2000–01 season was Hapoel Nahariya first season back in the National League, the club finished fourth in the league table, however, they failed to achieve promotion. Nahariya would achieve promotion to the Premier League in the 2001–02 National League season, as the team finished second place in the league table.

The 2002–03 season would be Hapoel Nahariya first season back in the Premier League since 1994. The season would mark the team colors to change from the original orange and blue to purple and white. Nahariya would go on to have a successful campaign as the club finished second place in the Premier League. Nahariya managed to make it all the way to the Premier League final before losing to eventual champions Maccabi Tel Aviv.

The 2003–04 season would mark Hapoel Nahariya first time in international competition as the club qualified for the 2003–04 FIBA Europe League. In the qualifying round, Nahariya finished second place and advanced in the playoffs where they met and defeated Turkish side Türk Telekom in a best out of two series in the Round of 16 before eventually falling to Russian side Ural Great in the quarterfinals. Domestically, Nahariya would continue their success from last season as they would finish third place in the league table as they would reach the semifinals before losing to Hapoel Tel Aviv.

Hapoel Nahariya third-place finish allowed them to qualify for the 2004–05 FIBA Europe League where they finished top of their group. Nahariya would defeat Dutch side Demon Astronauts in the Round of 16 before yet again getting eliminated in the Round of 16, this time against Ukrainian side Kyiv. Nahariya would finish their 2004–05 Premier League campaign in sixth place as they would be eliminated in the quarterfinals against Ironi Ashkelon. Nahariya managed to make the semifinals of the State Cup before eventually getting eliminated against Bnei Hasharon.

Hapoel Nahariya were unable to replicate their success in international competition as the 2005–06 FIBA EuroCup would see Nahariya finish third in their group, they were unable to finish above Russian side Khimki and Czech side ČEZ Nymburk and thus were eliminated. Nahariya were able to finish in fourth place in the league table as they would lose in the semifinals to eventual champions Maccabi Tel Aviv.

Hapoel Nahariya would continue to struggle in international competition as yet again they would finish third in their group in the 2006–07 FIBA EuroCup just behind Spanish side MMT Estudiantes and French side JDA Dijon. Nahariya would finish fifth place in the league, however, they would be just short of a playoff spot and ultimately missed out on the playoffs.

The 2007–08 campaign would see the team undergo a name change as they would become known as Iscar Nahariya. Nahariya would disappoint in the 2007–08 FIBA EuroCup, as the club would be eliminated in the second preliminary round by Latvian side Barons LMT. This would be Nahariya's last time in international competition until 2016. Nahariya would finish fourth in the league and would be eliminated in the semifinals against eventual champions Hapoel Holon. The season would mark the beginning of the end for Nahariya.

The club would undergo yet another name change as they would be renamed to from Iscar Nahariya to Ironi Nahariya. The team would struggle in the 2008–09 Premier League as they would have a disappointing seventh-place finish.

Ironi Nahariya would have one of their worst seasons in recent memory as the club would finish ninth place in the 2009–10 Premier League. The ninth-place finish meant that the team qualified for the playout in order to stay in the Premier League, however, they would lose the series against Hapoel Holon and thus were relegated to the National League for the first time since 2002.

=== 2010s ===
Ironi Nahariya would spend the next four seasons in the National League. The club would struggle in the 2010–11 and 2011–12 campaign as they would finish both fourteenth and tenths respectively. Nahariya would see much better success in 2012–13 as they would finish second, however, they were unable to get promoted. The 2013–14 season would see them finish first place in the National League and achieve promotion to the Premier League.

The 2014–15 Premier League season would prove to be rough for Nahariya as the team would finish tenth in their first time in the top-flight since 2010. The team was able to avoid relegation and thus would stay for another season.

In their second season back in the Premier League, the 2015–16 would show glimpses of the club's past in the mid-2000s, as the team would finish fourth in the league and qualify for the playoffs for the first time since 2009. The excitement was short lived, however, as the club would be upset in the quarterfinals against fifth seed Hapoel Eilat, which included a one-point loss at home against Eilat which would lead to their elimination.

For the first time since 2008, Ironi Nahariya would qualify for international competition in the form of the 2016–17 Basketball Champions League, the club was drawn into the second qualifying round where they would defeat Belarusian side Tsmoki Minsk and qualify for the Regular Season. Nahariya would end up finishing sixth in their group and were unable to qualify for the playoffs, however, they would be transferred to the playoffs of the FIBA Europe Cup where Nahariya would make it to the quarterfinals before being eliminated by German side Telekom Baskets Bonn. The team finished sixth place in the Premier League and were able to qualify for the playoffs where they would be eliminated against eventual champions Hapoel Jerusalem.

The 2017–18 season would be the start of another decline for the team as they would finish ninth in the league. The team was unable to qualify for the playoffs ultimately due to losing the tie-breaker against Ironi Nes Ziona.

The team would have a disappointing 2018–19 Premier League campaign as Nahariya would finish eleventh place in the league table. The team would just narrowly avoid relegation by two games.

The trend would keep continuing as Nahariya finished yet again eleventh place in the 2019–20 Premier League season. Originally, the team was seventh place after twenty-two matchdays, however, the COVID-19 pandemic led to the brief suspension of the 2019–20 Premier League season. Once league play returned, the club was unable to gain their form back. There was some success this season, as Nahariya would make it to the finals of the State Cup for the first time in club history before losing to Hapoel Jerusalem.

=== 2020s ===
The 2020–21 season would prove to be disastrous for the club. The season marked the club's return to international competition since 2017 when the club and the eleven other Israeli clubs (excluding Maccabi Tel Aviv) joined the competition, after temporary suspension of 2020-2021 Israeli Basketball League due to the COVID-19 pandemic. The club was drawn into Group B alongside Hapoel Gilboa Galil and Maccabi Haifa. The team defeated Maccabi Haifa in both meetings, however, they lost both meetings between Hapoel Gilboa Galil. The club finished with two wins and placed second, however, they did not advance to the second round and thus ended their international campaign. The Israeli League campaign wouldn't go any better as the club would finish with a league worst three wins and twenty-seven losses record and ultimately relegation to the National League.

== Honours ==
=== Domestic competitions ===
- State Cup

Runners-up: 2020

==== Lower division competitions ====
- Liga Artzit / Israeli National League (2nd)

Winners: 1981 (North Division), 2014

- National League Cup

Champions (1): 2022

=== European competitions ===
==== Regional competitions ====
- Balkan League

Final-Four: 2022

== Sponsorship naming ==
Due to sponsorship deals, Ironi Nahariya have been also known as:

- Ironi Isscar Nahariya (2007–2008)
- Ironi Geshem Nahariya (2020–2021)
- Ironi Rain Nahariya (2021–present)

== Players ==
=== Current roster ===
Ironi Rain Nahariya roster
Players
Coaches

Pos.	No.	Nat.	Name	Ht.	Wt.	Age
F	1	(United States)	Earlington, Marcellus	2.01 m (6 ft 7 in)	104 kg (229 lb)	26 – 24 April 2000
F/C	3	(United States)	Stevens, Amin	2.03 m (6 ft 8 in)	98 kg (216 lb)	35 – 26 October 1990
G	4	(United States) (Israel)	Rubin, Darren	1.88 m (6 ft 2 in)	84 kg (185 lb)	22 – 26 July 2004
G	5	(Israel)	Poleg, Omer	1.82 m (6 ft 0 in)	80 kg (176 lb)	27 – 15 October 1999
F	8	(Israel)	Ben Yakov, Ofek	2.00 m (6 ft 7 in)	92 kg (203 lb)	32 – 8 January 1994
G	10	(Israel)	Aharoni, Amit	1.87 m (6 ft 2 in)	82 kg (181 lb)	24 – 9 February 2002
G	11	(Israel)	Jorno, Koren	1.76 m (5 ft 9 in)	75 kg (165 lb)	27 – 21 November 1998
SF	12	(Israel)	Aizik, Ariel	1.97 m (6 ft 6 in)	94 kg (207 lb)	23 – 21 May 2003
G	13	(Israel)	Boguslavsky, Boris	1.85 m (6 ft 1 in)	82 kg (181 lb)	27 – 4 December 1998
F	17	(Israel)	Poran, Tomer	1.98 m (6 ft 6 in)	97 kg (214 lb)	18 – 10 February 2008
PF	22	(Israel)	Ben Shemen, Nave	2.00 m (6 ft 7 in)	100 kg (220 lb)	26 – 30 June 2000
PF	23	(United States)	Johnson, Justin	2.01 m (6 ft 7 in)	108 kg (238 lb)	30 – 23 May 1996
G	24	(Israel)	Alber, Eidan	1.96 m (6 ft 5 in)	93 kg (205 lb)	26 – 25 January 2000
G/F	34	(Israel)	Nadler, Ori	1.95 m (6 ft 5 in)	88 kg (194 lb)	24 – 3 October 2002

Head coach

- (Israel) Ruven Najberger

Assistant coach(es)

- (Israel) Guy Cohen
- (Israel) Rafi Hasin
- (Israel) Ido Safrin

Legend

- (C) Team captain
- Injured

- Roster
Updated: August 25, 2026

=== Depth chart ===
Pos.	Starting 5	Bench 1	Bench 2
C	Amin Stevens	Nave Ben Shemen
PF	Justin Johnson	Ofek Ben Yakov	Marcellus Earlington
SF	Ariel Aizik	Eidan Alber	Tomer Poran
SG	Amit Aharoni	Darren Rubin	Ori Nadler
PG	Boris Boguslavsky	Koren Jorno	Omer Poleg

- The Israeli League rule requires every team to have at least one Israeli on the court at any time.
- There should be at least 7 Israelis and up to 5 foreigners on a 12-men game sheet.

Source: basket.co.il

=== Squad changes for the 2026–27 season ===
==== In ====
No.	Pos.	Nat.	Name	Moving from	
3	F	(United States)	Amin Stevens	Maccabi Rishon LeZion	(Israel)
4	G	(United States)	Darren Rubin	New York University	(United States)
5	G	(Israel)	Omer Poleg	A.S. Ironi Ashkelon	(Israel)
10	G	(Israel)	Amit Aharoni	Maccabi Rehovot	(Israel)
11	G	(Israel)	Koren Jorno	Maccabi Petah Tikva	(Israel)
12	F	(Israel)	Ariel Aizik	Hapoel Be'er Sheva	(Israel)
13	G	(Israel)	Boris Boguslavsky	Elitzur Netanya	(Israel)
17	F	(Israel)	Tomer Poran	Hapoel HaEmek	(Israel)
22	F/C	(Israel)	Nave Ben Shemen	Hapoel Be'er Sheva	(Israel)
23	PF	(United States)	Justin Johnson	Scaligera Basket Verona	(Italy)
24	G	(Israel)	Eidan Alber	Hapoel HaEmek	(Israel)

==== Out ====
No.	Pos.	Nat.	Name	Moving to	
1	G/F	(United States)	Chris Clarke	free agent	(United States)
7	C	(Israel)	Alex Chubrevich	Maccabi Kiryat Gat	(Israel)
8	G	(Israel)	Omer Ben David	Maccabi Ashdod	(Israel)
9	G	(Israel)	Ori Yair	free agent	(Israel)
10	F	(United States)	Marcellus Earlington	free agent	(United States)
11	G	(Israel)	Ido Davidi	Ramat HaSharon	(Israel)
12	PG	(Israel)	Yogev Ohayon	Elitzur Netanya	(Israel)
14	PF	(United States)	Eli Abaev	free agent	(United States)
18	SG	(Israel)	Tomer Cohen	Maccabi Kiryat Gat	(Israel)
20	G/F	(Israel)	Noam Akrish	Hapoel Galil Elyon	(Israel)
22	F/C	(Israel)	Tomer Levinson	Hapoel Haifa	(Israel)
26	SG	(Israel)	Yanir Binyamin	Maccabi Rehovot	(Israel)
35	G	(Israel)	Clarke Rosenberg	Maccabi Kiryat Gat	(Israel)

== Season by season ==
Season	Tier	Division	Pos.	Postseason	State Cup	Other cups		European competitions		
2001–02	2	National League	2nd	Runners-up ▲	—	—		—		
2002–03	1	Premier League	2nd	Runners-up	—	—		—		
2003–04	1	Premier League	3rd	Semifinals	—	—		3	FIBA Europe League	QF
2004–05	1	Premier League	6th	Quarterfinals	—	—		3	FIBA Europe League	QF
2005–06	1	Premier League	4th	Semifinals	—	—		3	FIBA Europe League	RS
2006–07	1	Premier League	5th	Quarterfinals	—	League Cup	QF	3	FIBA Europe League	RS
2007–08	1	Premier League	4th	Semifinals	Quarterfinals	League Cup	4th	—		
2008–09	1	Premier League	7th	Quarterfinals	Semifinals	League Cup	RU	—		
2009–10	1	Premier League	9th	—	Quarterfinals	League Cup	QF	—		
2010–11	2	National League	14th	—	First round	—		—		
2011–12	2	National League	10th	—	—	—		—		
2012–13	2	National League	2nd	Semifinals	—	—		—		
2013–14	2	National League	1st	Champions ▲	—	—		—		
2014–15	1	Premier League	10th	—	Round of 16	—		—		
2015–16	1	Premier League	4th	Quarterfinals	Round of 16	—		—		
2016–17	1	Premier League	6th	Quarterfinals	Round of 16	League Cup	SF	3	Champions League	RS
2016–17	1	Premier League	6th	Quarterfinals	Round of 16	League Cup	SF	4	FIBA Europe Cup	QF
2017–18	1	Premier League	9th	—	Round of 16	League Cup	RU	—		
2018–19	1	Premier League	11th	—	First round	League Cup	QR	—		
2019–20	1	Premier League	11th	—	Runner up	League Cup	SF	—		
2020–21	1	Premier League	13th	—	Round of 16	League Cup	R1	R	Balkan League	RS
2021–22	2	National League	1st	Semifinals	—	National Cup	QF	R	Balkan League	3rd
2022–23	2	National League	5th	Quarterfinals	—	National Cup	C	—		
2023–24	2	National League	3rd	Semifinals	—	National Cup	QF	—		
2024–25	2	National League	5th	Semifinals	—	National Cup	RU	—		

== Head coaches ==
- (Israel) Roy Hagay (2014)
- (Israel) Eric Alfasi (2015–2019)
- (Israel) Danny Franco (2020)
- (Israel) Shay Seglovich (2021–present)

== Notable players ==
Note: Flags indicate national team eligibility at FIBA-sanctioned events. Players may hold other non-FIBA nationalities not displayed.

Criteria

To appear in this section a player must have either:

- Set a club record or won an individual award while at the club
- Played at least one official international match for their national team at any time
- Played at least one official NBA match at any time.

- (Israel) Eran Asante
- (Israel) Ben Altit
- (Israel) Amit Ben-David
- (Israel) Ziv Ben-Zvi
- (Israel) Niv Berkowitz
- (Israel) Tomer Ginat
- (Israel) Uri Kokia
- (Israel) Ido Kozikaro
- (Israel) Orr Leumi
- (Israel) Raviv Limonad
- (Israel) Erez Markovich
- (Israel) Matan Naor
- (Israel) Yogev Ohayon
- (Israel) Barak Peleg
- (Israel) Itay Segev
- (Israel) Sharon Shason
- (Israel) Yiftach Ziv
- (Israel) (Bosnia and Herzegovina) Robert Rothbart
- (Israel) (Montenegro) Velibor Radović
- (Israel) (Russia) Alex Chubrevich
- (Israel) (Sweden) Jonathan Skjöldebrand
- (Israel) (Ukraine) Igor Nesterenko
- (Israel) (United States) Joe Alexander
- (Israel) (United States) David Blatt
- (Israel) (United States) Cory Carr
- (Israel) (United States) Richard Howell
- (Israel) (United States) Jeron Roberts
- (Israel) (United States) Chris Smith
- (Canada) (Dominican Republic) Juan Mendez
- (Cape Verde) Ivan Almeida
- (Montenegro) Luka Pavićević
- (New Zealand) Corey Webster
- (Nigeria) (United States) Michael Umeh
- (United States) Jeff Adrien
- (United States) Cat Barber
- (United States) Jaron Blossomgame
- (United States) Gilbert Brown
- (United States) Eric Campbell
- (United States) Cameron Clark
- (United States) Jordan Crawford
- (United States) Nick Faust
- (United States) Myke Henry
- (United States) Otis Hill
- (United States) Scotty Hopson
- (United States) Kalin Lucas
- (United States) Arthur Lee
- (United States) Mark Lyons
- (United States) Jerel McNeal
- (United States) Tyrone Nash
- (United States) Malik Newman
- (United States) Adrian Pledger
- (United States) Tim Quarterman
- (United States) Marquis Teague
- (United States) Hakim Warrick
- (United States) Dominic Waters
- (United States) Jayson Wells
- (United States) John Williamson
- (United States) Alex Young
