= Daniel Koperberg =

Israeli basketball player

Daniel Koperberg דניאל קופרברג
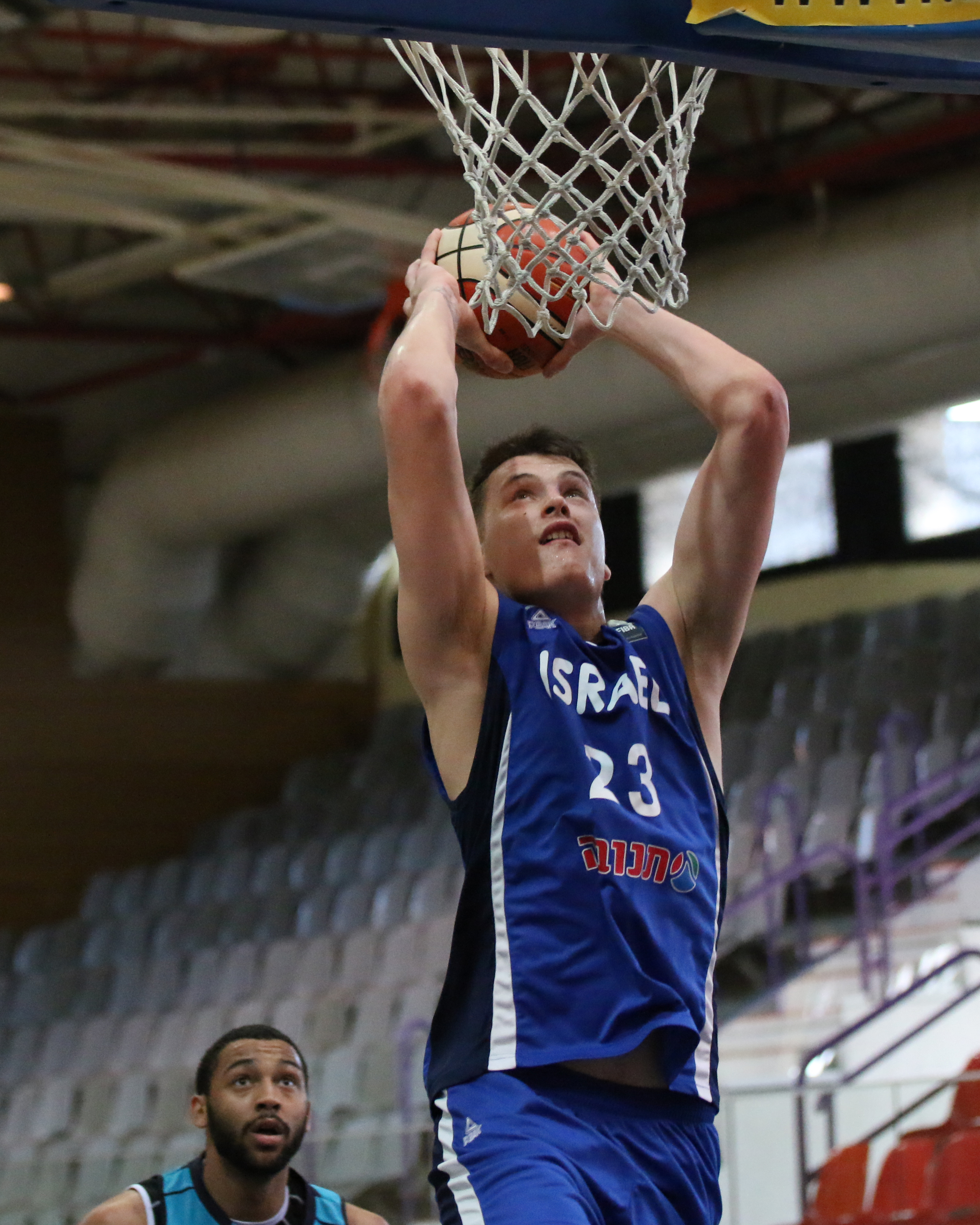
- Koperberg playing for Israel U-20 in 2017

No. 33 – Maccabi Haifa
- Position: Center
- League: Israeli National League

Personal information
- Born: December 8, 1997 (age 28) Saint Petersburg, Russia
- Listed height: 2.08 m (6 ft 10 in)
- Listed weight: 105 kg (231 lb)

Career information
- High school: Hebrew Reali, Haifa
- Playing career: 2016–present

Career history
- 2016–2019: Maccabi Haifa
- 2018: → Hapoel Afula
- 2019–2021: Hapoel Tel Aviv
- 2021-: Maccabi Haifa

Career highlights
- Israeli National League champion (2019); Israeli Premier League All-Star (2017)
Medals
Representing Israel
Men's basketball
FIBA Europe Under-20
Silver medal – second place	2017 Greece	National Team

Daniel Koperberg (Hebrew: דניאל קופרברג; born December 8, 1997) is a Russian-born Israeli basketball player for Maccabi Haifa of the Israeli National League.

== Early years ==
Koperberg was born in Saint Petersburg, Russia, and was adopted by an Israeli family a few months after his birth. Koperberg grew up in Haifa, Israel, where he played for Maccabi Haifa's youth team and the Hebrew Reali high-school team.

== Professional career ==
On July 7, 2016, Koperberg signed a three-year contract with Maccabi Haifa. That season, Koperberg participated at the Israeli League All-Star Game and the Slam Dunk Contest.

On January 9, 2018, Koperberg signed a two-year contract extension with Maccabi Haifa. At the same day, he was loaned to Hapoel Afula of the Israeli National League for the rest of the season.

In the 2018–19 season, Koperberg won the 2019 Israeli National League Championship title with Haifa, earning a promotion back to the Israeli Premier League.

On December 23, 2019, Koperberg parted ways with Haifa.

On December 30, 2019, Koperberg signed a three-year deal with Hapoel Tel Aviv.

== Israeli national team ==
Koperberg was a member of the Israeli Under-18 national team.

In July 2017, Koperberg helped the Israeli Under-20 national team to reach the 2017 FIBA Europe Under-20 Championship finals by averaging 10.7 points and 6.9 rebounds per game. One month later, he participated at the 2017 Summer Universiade.
