= Maccabi Haifa B.C. =

Maccabi Haifa
- Nickname: The Greens; The Greens from Carmel
- Leagues: Liga Artzit
- Founded: 1953; 73 years ago
- History: Maccabi Haifa; 1953–1999, 2009–present B.C. Haifa; 2000–2003; B.C. Haifa/Nesher; 2003–2005; Maccabi Haifa/Bat Galim; 2005–2006; Maccabi Haifa/Carmel; 2006–2007; Maccabi Haifa Heat; 2007–2009
- Arena: Romema Arena
- Capacity: 5,000
- Location: Haifa, Israel
- Team colours: Green, White
- Head coach: (Israel) Bnei Katz
- Team captain: (Israel) Storm Warren
- Ownership: (Israel) Shay Yohay Klausner
- Championships: 1 Israeli Championships
Home	Away

Maccabi Haifa Basketball Club is an Israeli professional basketball club based in Haifa, Israel. It is the basketball section of the Maccabi Haifa association. The team currently competes in the Liga Artzit, the third tier of basketball in Israel, following their relegation from the second tier Liga Leumit at the end of the 2025–26 season. The team plays their home games in the Romema Arena, which can seat up to 5,000 spectators.

== History ==
=== 1950s ===
Maccabi Haifa basketball Club was established in 1954 in the port city of Haifa in the Mutasarrifate of Jerusalem Maccabi Haifa, known as "The Greens," is one of the oldest basketball teams in Israel, and is one of the original eight teams that formed the top division in 1953. The club would struggle its first years of existence as they would fail to achieve a winning record in its first five seasons in the league and eventually were relegated in 1960.

=== 1960s ===
Maccabi Haifa would make their return to the Premier League in 1961 as they would stay in the Premier League for the majority of the decade, though the club would undergo many ups and downs through the 1960s. The team would finish the 1967 season with a winning record, their first in club history.

=== 1970s ===
The 1970s would see Maccabi Haifa struggle again in the Premier League. In 1971, the club would reach the Israeli Basketball State Cup finals where they would lose to champions Maccabi Tel Aviv. Maccabi Haifa would qualify for international competition for the first time in club history in the form of the 1971–72 FIBA European Cup Winners' Cup, the team would be eliminated in the first round by French side Denain Voltaire. Maccabi Haifa would once again suffer relegation in 1974, however, this would be short lived as the club would return to the Premier League the following season. Maccabi Haifa wouldn't escape relegation for long, however, as the club would yet again suffer relegation in 1978.

=== 1980s ===
The 1980s would be a much more stable decade for Maccabi Haifa basketball. After a two-year absence, the club made their return to the Premier League in 1980, where they would maintain form and stay altogether in the Premier League for the entire decade. Maccabi Haifa would qualify for the Premier League playoffs for the first time in 1984. In 1985, the club would once again reach the finals of the State Cup, before losing once again to Maccabi Tel Aviv. Maccabi Haifa made their return to international competition participating in the 1985–86 FIBA European Cup Winners' Cup, the team would defeat Cypriot side ENAD in the first round before falling to Yugoslav side Jugoplastika. Maccabi Haifa would qualify for the 1987–88 FIBA Korać Cup were the club would defeat Cypriot side Achilleas Kaimakli in the first round before being eliminated by French side ASVEL in the second round. Koren Amisha would be named the winner of the 1990 Israeli League Rising Star.

=== 1990s ===
Despite optimism from the 1980s, the 1990s would prove to be a disastrous era for Maccabi Haifa. The team would qualify for the 1992–93 FIBA Korać Cup where they were eliminated in the second round by French side Gravelines. Maccabi Haifa tenure in the Premier League would come to an end in 1993, as the club would end up facing relegation. Despite this, Gary Alexander would lead the league in total rebounds per game. The misfortunes kept continuing as the club would last three seasons in the National League before being relegated yet again to the third tier. The club would be able to achieve back-to-back promotions to the National League and the Premier League. The club returned to international competition in the form of the 1999–2000 FIBA Korać Cup were the club would defeat Cypriot side Keravnos Keo in the first round, the club would also top their group in the second round and advance to the playoffs where they would be eliminated by Italian side Pepsi Rimini.

=== 2000s ===
The 2000s would see drastic changes to Maccabi Haifa. In 2000, Haifa mayor Amram Mitzna merged Maccabi Haifa with Hapoel Haifa to form a new club called B.C. Haifa. The 2000–01 Premier League season would see the team finish the season in fourth place in the league table, qualifying for the playoffs where they would be defeated in the semifinals by Maccabi Tel Aviv. B.C. Haifa's Stanley Brundy lead the league in rebounds per game and Corey Gaines would lead the league in assists per game.

B.C. Haifa were able to maintain the same form for the 2001–02 Premier League season as the team would again finish fourth place and would qualify for the playoffs once more. Once again, B.C. Haifa weren't able to overpower Maccabi Tel Aviv as they would suffer elimination once more by the perennial champions in the semifinals. Stanley Brundy and Corey Gaines would yet again lead the league in their respective rebounds and assists per game categories.

Despite having success the past two seasons, the 2002–03 season would be one that B.C. Haifa would struggle as the club would finish with a disappointing eleventh place in the league, failing to qualify for the playoffs. Corey Gaines would once again become the few bright spots on the team as he would once again lead the league in assists per game.

B.C. Haifa would undergo a name change from B.C. Haifa to B.C. Haifa/Nesher. While having shown previous success a few seasons ago, the club would begin to experience financial difficulties. The 2003–04 season would be a reflection of this as the club would yet again finish eleventh place, failing to make the playoffs and just avoiding relegation.

The financial difficulties would lead the club to a crashing end as the team would finish the 2004–05 season in twelfth place and ultimately relegation to the National League. The club fate would ultimately see them fold and the last rights of the club would be sold to Bnei HaSharon. The overall merger of Maccabi Haifa and Hapoel Haifa would become a failure that caused a drastic impact of the two clubs as they would later reform into different entities.

In an attempt to salvage the club, former officials decided to change the name of the team's previous second team Maccabi Bat Galim to Maccabi Haifa/Bat Galim officially restoring to Maccabi Haifa name that had been dormant for six years, the main goals was to restore the club's glory days. Maccabi Haifa would have to restart in the third tier, they would achieve promotion back to the National League in 2007. That same year saw Maccabi Haifa being purchased by American businessman Jeffrey Rosen, who invested heavily in the club. In 2008, Maccabi Haifa were officially promoted back to the Premier League.

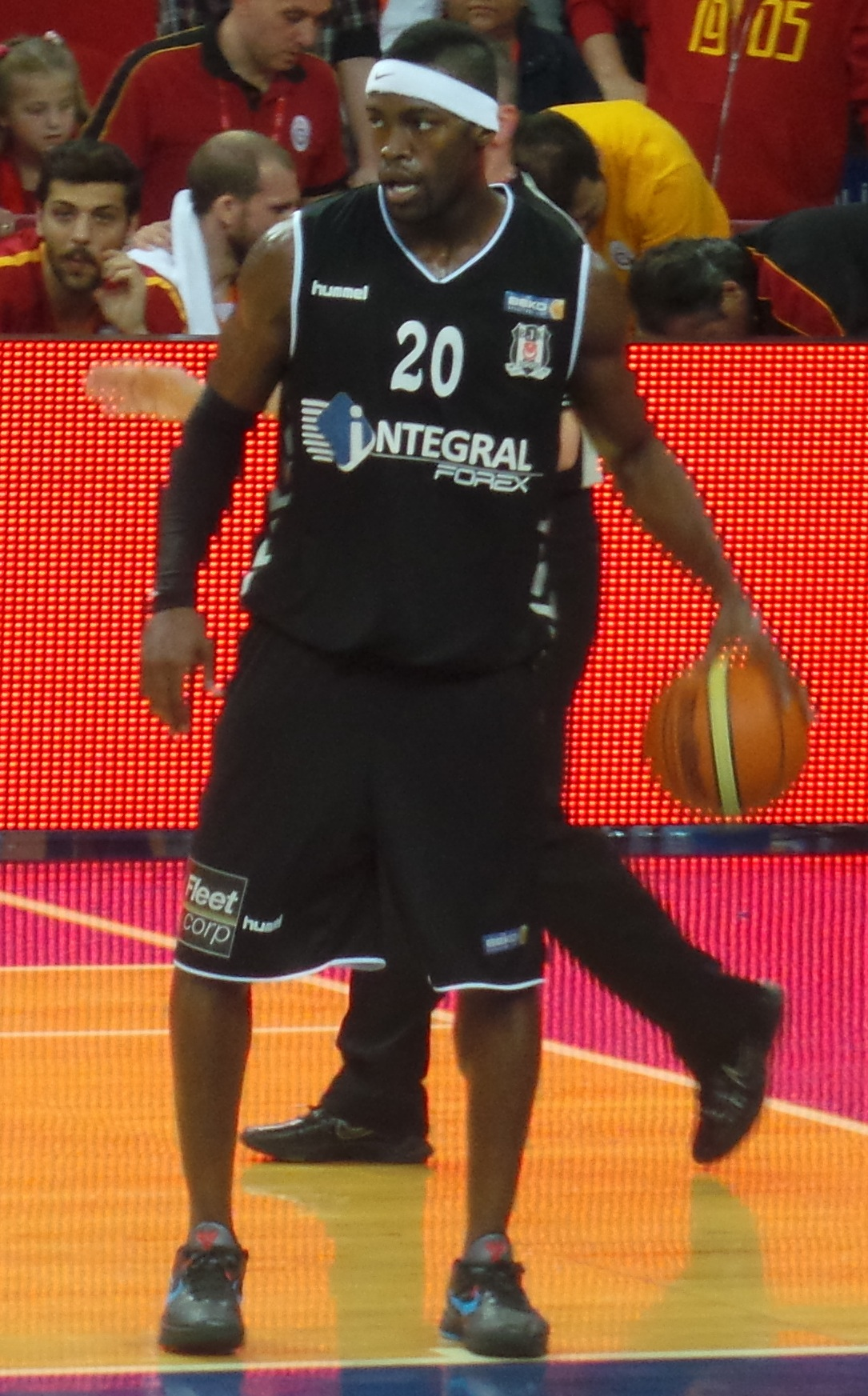
Doron Perkins

Jeffrey Rosen investment of the club would show in the 2008–09 season as the team would finish second place in the league. Doron Perkins would become a key piece to the team's success as he would take the 2009 League MVP and would be selected into the 2009 All-Premier League First Team. Davon Jefferson would also excel well as he would win the 2009 Premier League 6th Man of the Year award. Maccabi Haifa coach Avi Ashkenazi would win 2009 Premier League Coach of the Year. The team would reach the Premier League finals before falling once more to champions Maccabi Tel Aviv. The team would also reach the finals of the 2009 State Cup would they would fall to winners Hapoel Holon.

Maccabi Haifa would continue their success as the team would finish third place in the 2009–10 regular season. Despite this, Maccabi Haifa would end up getting upset in the quarterfinals against Elitzur Netanya.

=== 2010s ===
The 2010–11 season would see Maccabi Haifa return to international competition in the form of the 2010–11 FIBA EuroChallenge. Maccabi Haifa would advance out the qualifying round defeating French side Paris-Levallois, they would finish second place in the group in the regular season and qualify for the Round of 16, however, the team would finish third place in their group and fail to make the quarterfinals. Maccabi Haifa were unable to continue their success the past two seasons as the club would finish the league season with a disappointing ninth-place finish.

Maccabi Haifa finished eleventh in the 2011–12 season, narrowly avoiding relegation. The following season proved more successful for the club.

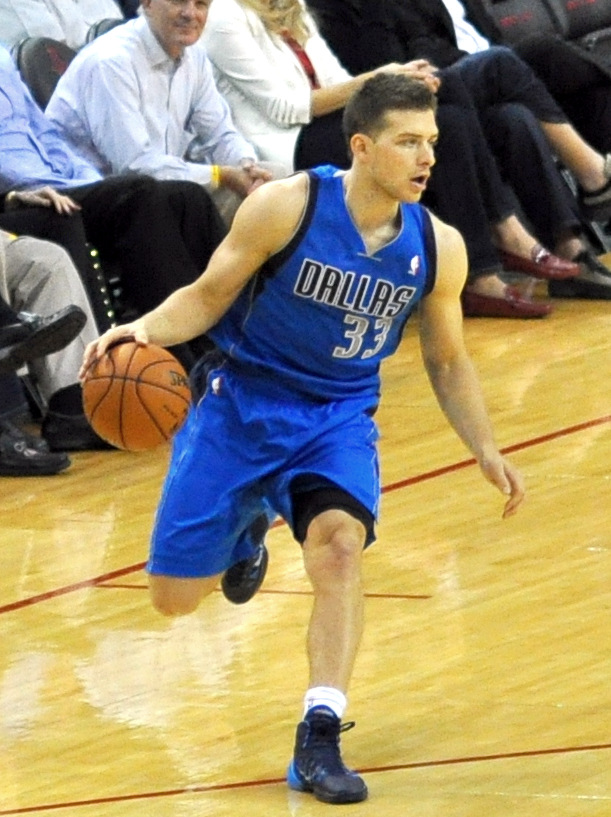
Gal Mekel

The 2012–13 Premier League season saw the team finish the regular season in second place. Gal Mekel would become one of the biggest pieces of Maccabi Haifa's success as he would become the 2012 League MVP and be elected into the 2012 All-Premier League First Team. His teammate, Pat Calathes would also achieve 2012 All-Premier League First Team recommendation as well. The team's success in 2012 would lead to Brad Greenberg winning the 2012 Premier League Coach of the Year. The team's success would lead them all the way to the Premier League final we’re they would once again meet rivals Maccabi Tel Aviv. Maccabi Haifa would win their first-ever championship in franchise history defeating Maccabi Tel Aviv 86-79 in the final game. Pat Calathes would become the hero for Maccabi Haifa as he would win the 2012 Premier League Finals MVP.

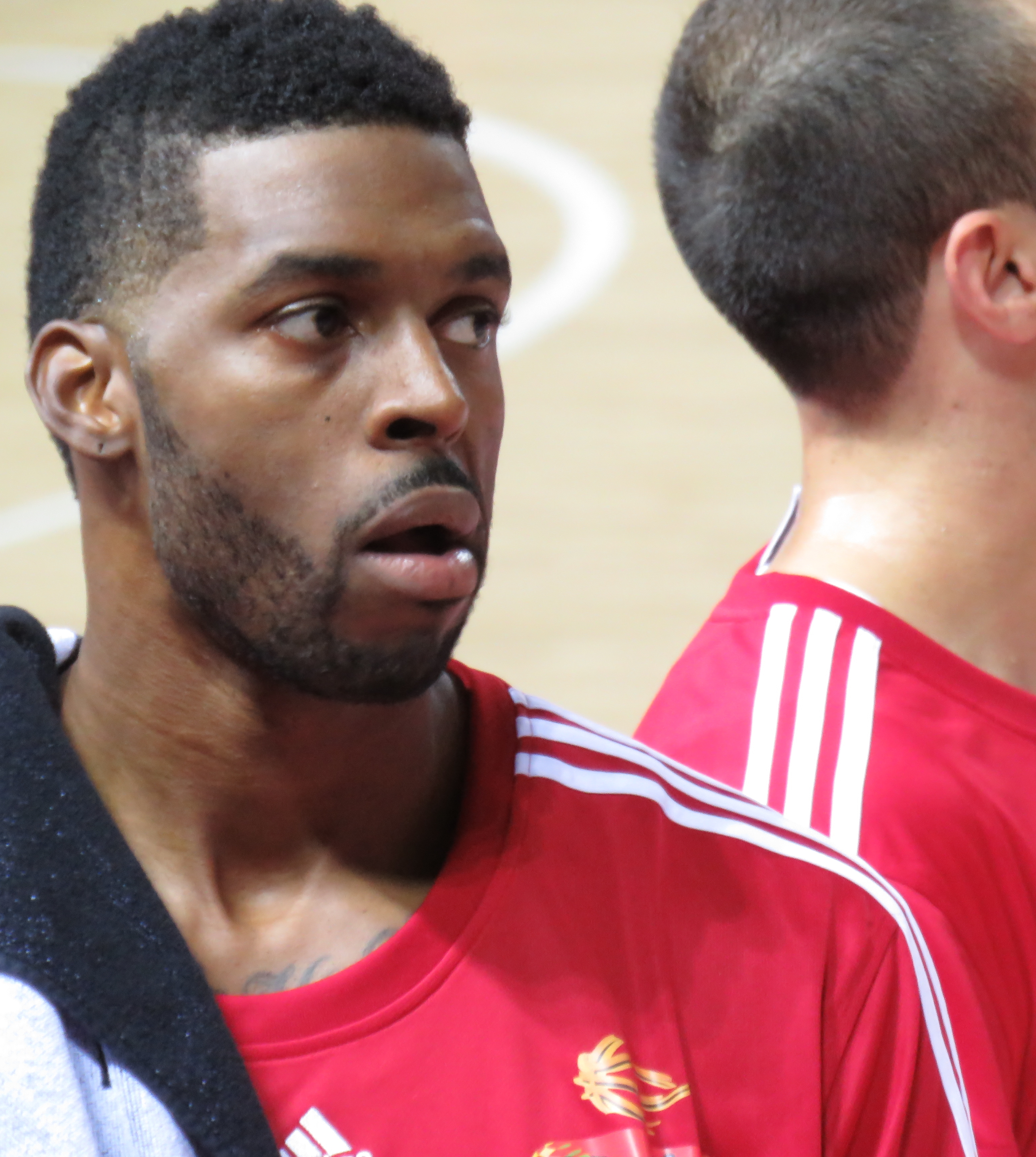
Donta Smith

The expectations were high for the defending champions of the Premier League as the Maccabi Haifa would participate in the 2013–14 EuroCup. Maccabi Haifa would finish second place in their group in the regular season, this would allow them to advance to the Round of 32, where they would end up finishing last place in their group and thus elimination from the EuroCup. Maccabi Haifa would continue their league success as the team would finish third place in the regular season. Maccabi Haifa would once again have a League MVP as Donta Smith would win the 2014 Premier League MVP and 2014 All-Premier League First Team selection. Brian Randle would become one of the best defensive players in the league as he would win the 2014 Premier League Defensive Player of the Year. The team would once again make the Premier League finals, we’re they meet once more against Maccabi Tel Aviv, the results, however, we’re different as Maccabi Tel Aviv would come out victorious. Maccabi Haifa's Dagan Yivzori would end up winning the 2014 Premier League Finals MVP.

Maccabi Haifa would continue their string of playoff appearances as the team would finish the 2014–15 season in fifth place. Ike Ofoegbu would be selected in the 2015 All-Premier League First Team. Maccabi Haifa were unable to reach the finals once more as the team would be eliminated in the quarterfinals against Hapoel Eilat.

Maccabi Haifa showed glimpses of their previous success as the team would finish with a third-place finish in 2015-16 the regular season. Gregory Vargas would be one of the biggest focuses of the team as he would win the 2016 Premier League Defensive Player of the Year. Maccabi Haifa would once more see disappointment in the playoffs as they would be once again eliminated in the quarterfinals, this time against eventual league champions Maccabi Rishon LeZion.

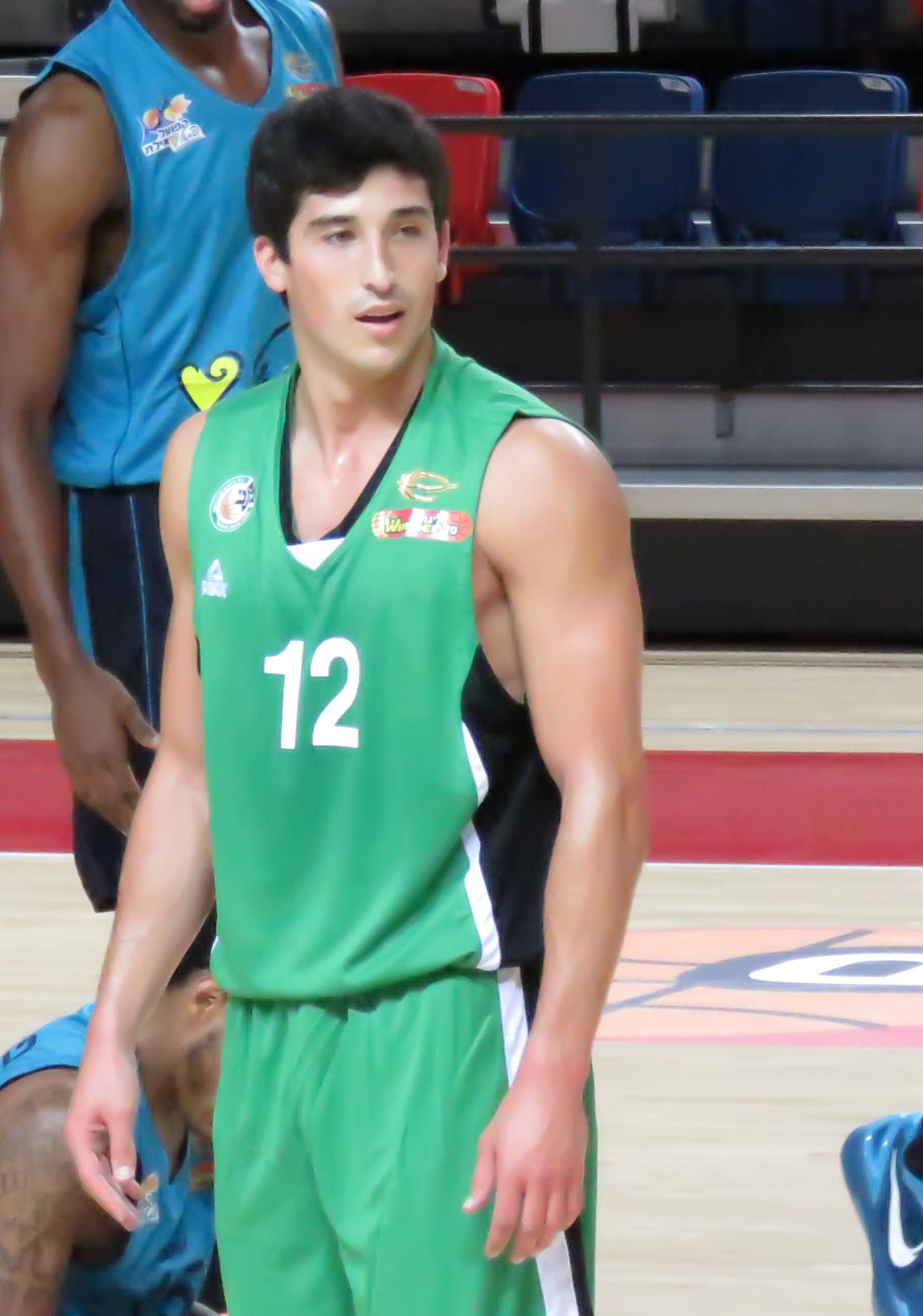
John DiBartolomeo

The 2016-17 would be considered as a rollercoaster for Maccabi Haifa. The team finished eighth place in the league, qualifying for the playoffs once more. One of the most important players was John DiBartolomeo who became a star in the league as he would win 2017 Premier League MVP and also selected into the 2017 All-Premier League First Team. Gregory Vargas would also once again win the 2017 Premier League Defensive Player of the Year. Despite being the eighth seed, Maccabi Haifa managed to make it all the way to the Premier League Finals where they would fall to eventual champions Hapoel Jerusalem.

Despite everything going well for Maccabi Haifa in the 2010s, the 2017–18 season would signal the downfall of the team once more. Maccabi Haifa would have a disappointing season and would end up finishing twelfth place in the league. The team lost the tie-breaker against Maccabi Rishon LeZion and thus were ultimately relegated to the National League for the first time since 2008. Maccabi Haifa's stay in the National League would be short-lived as the team would quickly be promoted back to the Premier League the following season.

The 2019-20 saw Maccabi Haifa back in the Premier League, the team would return to the playoffs as they would finish sixth place in the league. James Young helped lead the way as he would lead the league in Points per Game for the campaign. Maccabi Haifa we’re quickly eliminated in the Round of 16 against Maccabi Rishon LeZion.

=== 2020s ===
Maccabi Haifa were unable to achieve success in the 2020–21 season. Maccabi Haifa made their return to international competition by joining the Balkan International Basketball League the team would end up finishing their regular season group in dead last as the team went winless and eliminated from the competition. The Premier League didn't go any better as the team would finish the season in twelfth place and ultimately relegation back to the National League once more. On June 21, 2021 Jeff Rosen announced that that he was leaving Maccabi Haifa after 14 years. On 2023-24 Maccabi Haifa finished the season in last place, and the team was relegated to the Liga Artzit after 17 years in professional leagues. For 2024-25 season the team returned its former team captain Ido Kozikaro to general manager job. The team finished the regular season with 30-0 record, and qualified for the playoffs from the first position. In the quarter final the team defeated Ironi Elitzur Givatayim 2-1 and advanced to the semi final, but after one game in the series, the league was interrupted due to Twelve-Day war and the team automatically promoted to the Liga Leumit.

== Arena ==
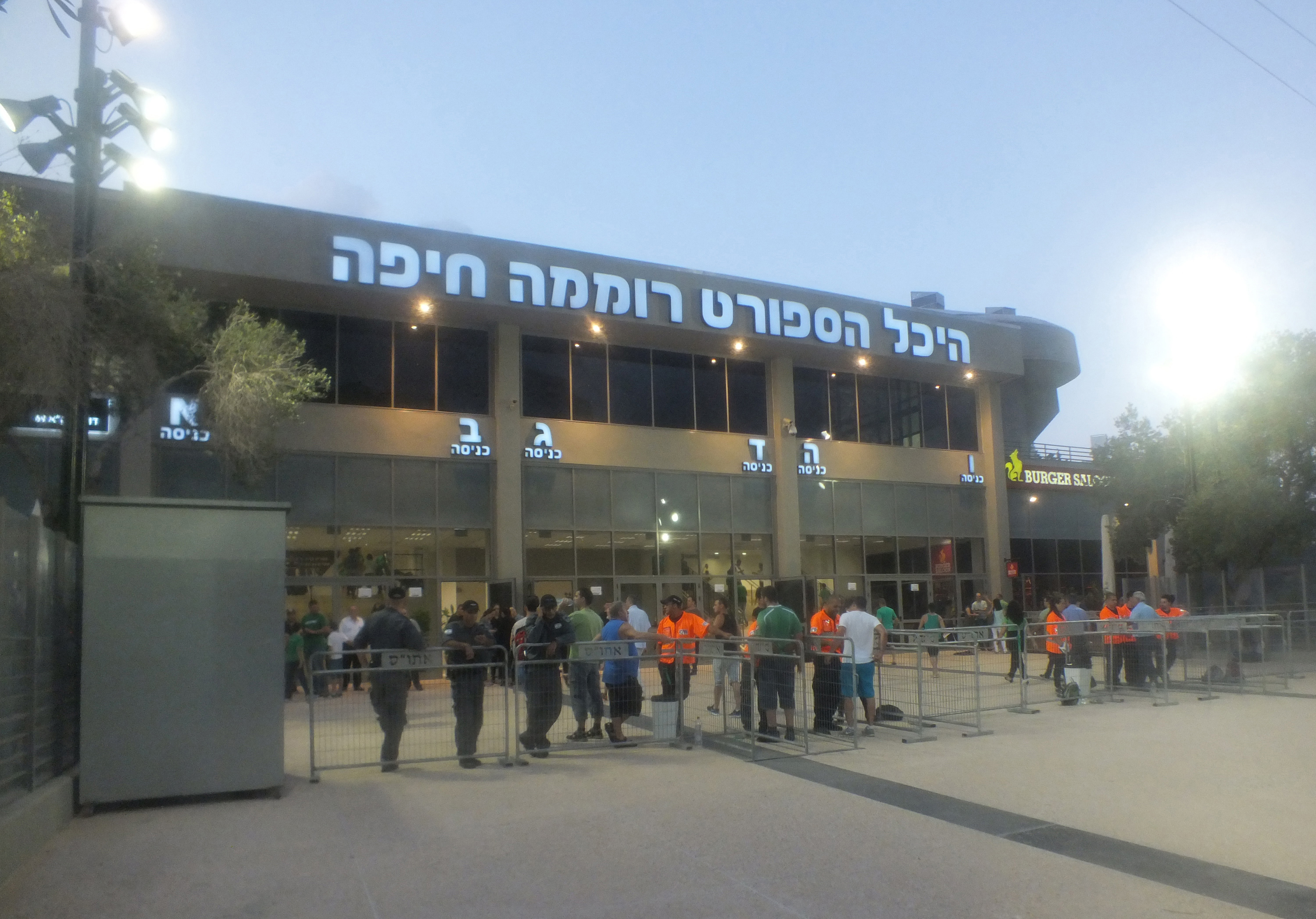
Romema Arena, home arena of the club

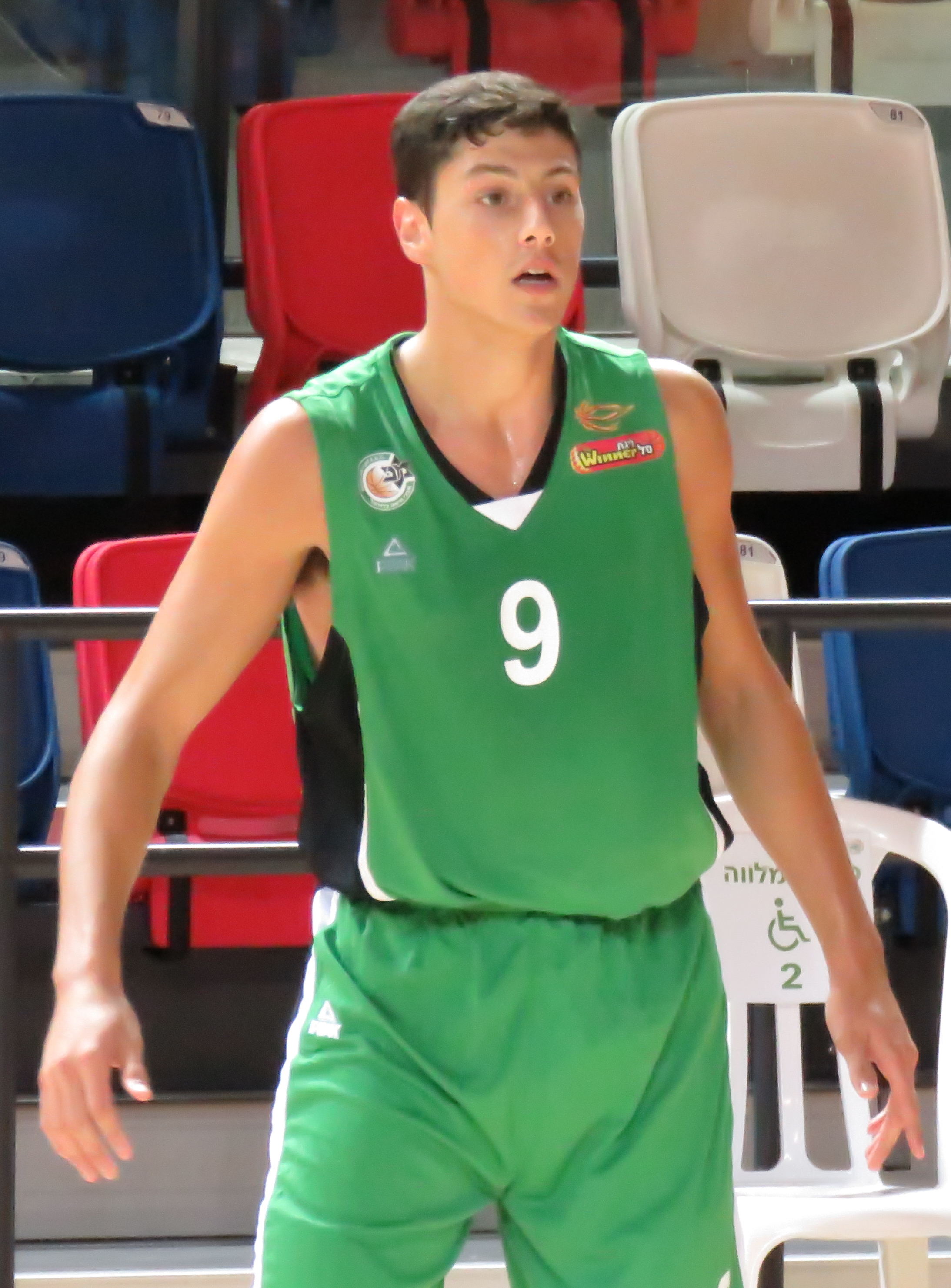
Yiftach Ziv

Between 2010 and 2012, the team played temporary at Ramot Itzhak Hall in Nesher, because the home arena Romema was renovated and its capacity was increased to 5,000 seats.

== Honours and records ==
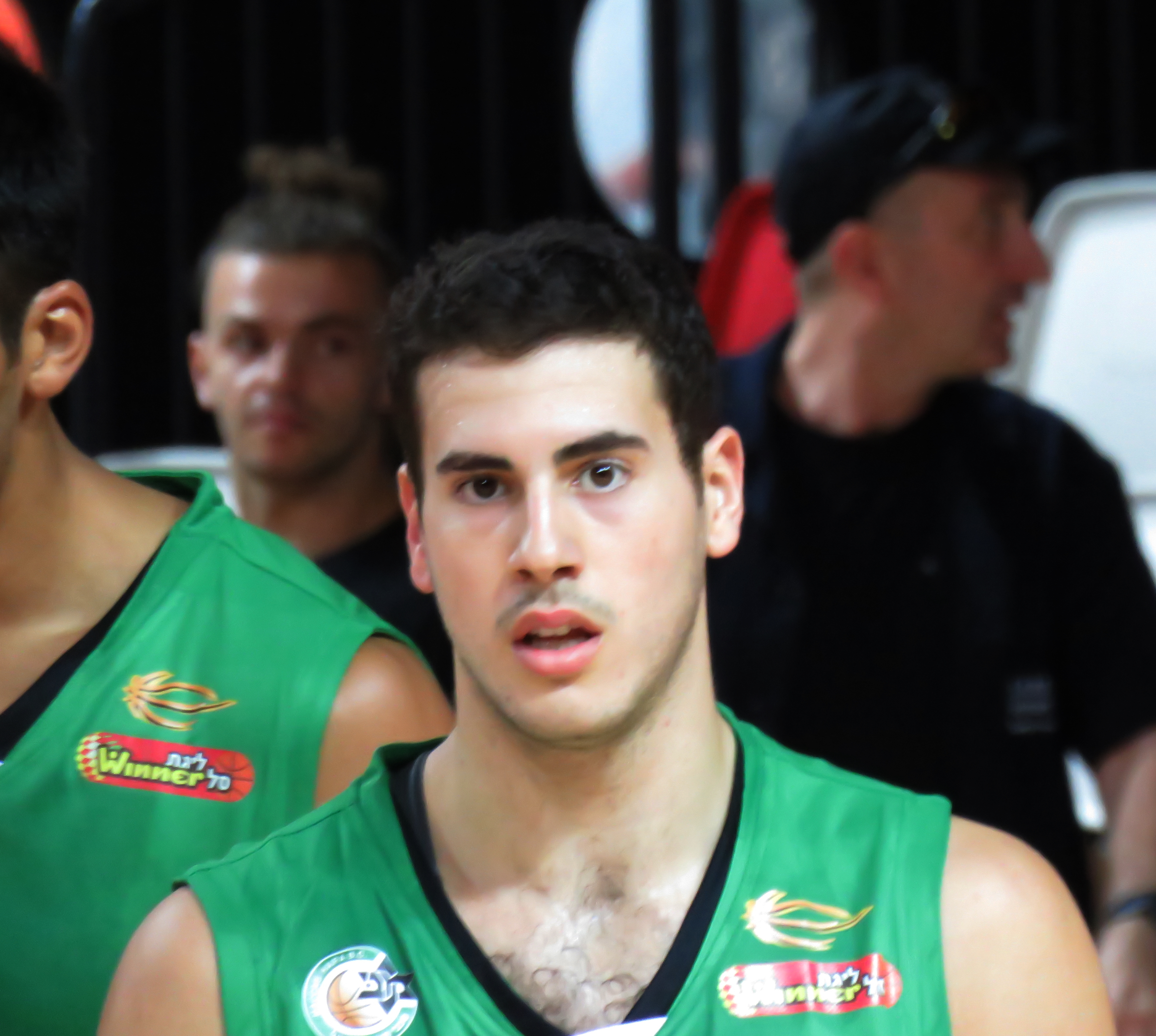
Oz Blayzer

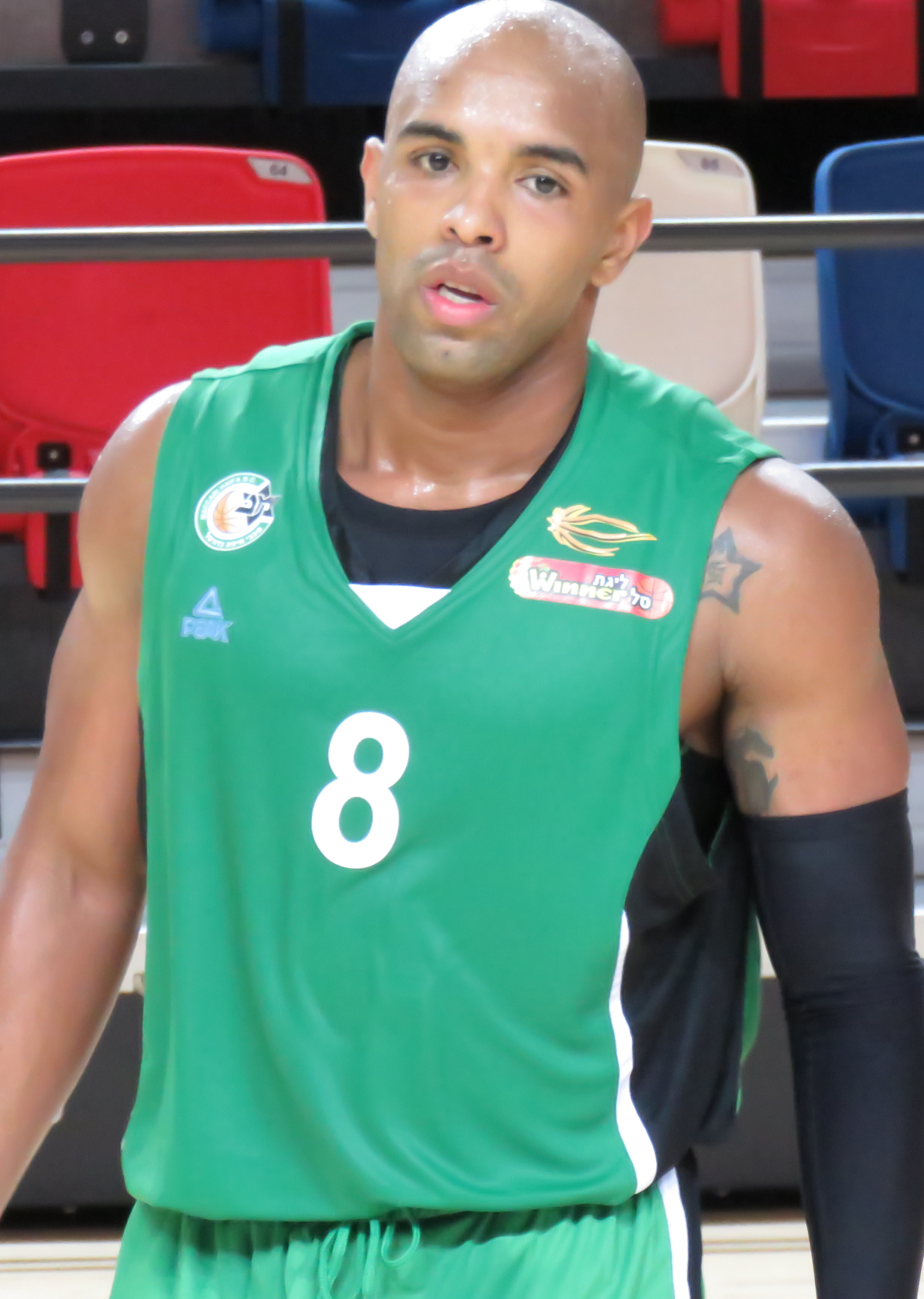
Gregory Vargas

Israeli Basketball Premier League

- Champions (1): 2012–2013
- Runner up (3) : 2008-2009, 2013-14, 2016-17

Israeli Basketball State Cup

- Runner up (4) : 1970–1971, 1984–1985, 2008-2009, 2012–2013

=== Lower division competitions ===
Liga Artzit / National League (2nd)

- Winners: 1956, 1961, 1974 (North Division), 1980 (North Division), 2019

== Roster ==
=== Current roster ===
Note: Flags indicate national team eligibility at FIBA-sanctioned events. Players may hold other non-FIBA nationalities not displayed.

Maccabi Haifa roster
Players
Coaches

Pos.	No.	Nat.	Name	Ht.	Age
G	1	(Israel)	Holin, Lahav	1.93 m (6 ft 4 in)	27 – 17 August 1999
G	4	(Israel) (United States)	Rubin, Darren	1.88 m (6 ft 2 in)	24 – 22 December 2001
F/C	5	(Israel)	Shoutvin, Anton	2.06 m (6 ft 9 in)	37 – 25 January 1989
C	8	(Israel)	Levi, Aviel	2.06 m (6 ft 9 in)	28 – 6 April 1998
G	10	(Israel)	Man, Yair	1.90 m (6 ft 3 in)	17 – 1 December 2008
G	11	(Israel)	Almog, Barak	1.85 m (6 ft 1 in)	18 – 17 August 2008
PG	12	(Israel)	Friedkin, Josh (C)	1.78 m (5 ft 10 in)	37 – 2 September 1989
G	13	(Israel)	Natov, Rey		18 – 3 March 2008
C	14	(Israel)	Sror, Elia	2.13 m (7 ft 0 in)	31 – 22 July 1995
G	21	(Israel)	Tapiro, Or	1.96 m (6 ft 5 in)	21 – 11 October 2005
SG	30	(Israel)	Abu-Ahmad, Azmi	1.88 m (6 ft 2 in)	30 – 23 December 1995
SG	33	(Israel)	Sharp, D.J .	1.88 m (6 ft 2 in)	29 – 19 December 1996
PG	35	(Israel)	Tzur, Raz	1.91 m (6 ft 3 in)	23 – 18 May 2003

Head coach

(Israel) Bnei Katz

Assistant coach(es)

Raz David
Stiv Panovka

Legend

- (C) Team captain
- Injured

=== Notable players ===
Note: Flags indicate national team eligibility at FIBA-sanctioned events. Players may hold other non-FIBA nationalities not displayed.

Criteria

To appear in this section a player must have either:

- Set a club record or won an individual award while at the club
- Played at least one official international match for their national team at any time
- Played at least one official NBA match at any time.

- (Israel) Koren Amisha
- (Israel) Netanel Artzi
- (Israel) Assaf Barnea
- (Israel) Avi Ben-Chimol
- (Israel) Moshe Bitter
- (Israel) Oz Blayzer
- (Israel) Michael Brisker
- (Israel) Chaim Buchbinder
- (Israel) Adi Gordon
- (Israel) Roi Huber
- (Israel) Rani Isaac
- (Israel) Elishay Kadir
- (Israel) Ze'ev Kagan
- (Israel) Itzhak Kisilov
- (Israel) Uri Kokia
- (Israel) Ido Kozikaro
- (Israel) Tom Maayan
- (Israel) Benny Marcus
- (Israel) Gal Mekel
- (Israel) Moshe Mizrahi
- (Israel) Gabi Neumark
- (Israel) Shlomo Peled
- (Israel) Gur Porat
- (Israel) Ari Rosenberg
- (Israel) Moran Roth
- (Israel) Itzhak Rubinstein
- (Israel) Doron Shefa
- (Israel) Amit Simhon
- (Israel) Tomer Steinhauer
- (Israel) Meir Tapiro
- (Israel) Dagan Yivzori
- (Israel) Yiftach Ziv
- (Israel) (Austria) Sylven Landesberg
- (Israel) (Belarus) Roman Rubinshteyn
- (Israel) (Belarus) Roman Sorkin
- (Israel) (Denmark) Chanan Colman
- (Israel) (Russia) Alexey Chubrevich
- (Israel) (Russia) Daniel Koperberg
- (Israel) (Tunisia) Dror Hajaj
- (Israel) (United States) David Blatt
- (Israel) (United States) Stanley Brundy
- (Israel) (United States) Cory Carr
- (Israel) (United States) Glenn Consor
- (Israel) (United States) John DiBartolomeo
- (Israel) (United States) Ryan Lexer
- (Israel) (United States) David Mastbaum
- (Israel) (United States) Willie Sims
- (Israel) (United States) Chris Smith
- (Israel) (United States) James Terry
- (Israel) (United States) Willy Workman
- (The Bahamas) Mark Dean
- (Dominican Republic) Rigoberto Mendoza
- (Greece) (United States) Pat Calathes
- (Jamaica) (United States) Andrew Kennedy
- (Mexico) (United States) Orlando Méndez-Valdez
- (Mexico) (United States) Alex Pérez-Kaufmann
- (Mexico) (United States) Paul Stoll
- (Nigeria) (United States) Ike Ofoegbu
- (Panama) Trevor Gaskins
- (Puerto Rico) Ángel Rodríguez
- (Senegal) Mamadou N'Diaye
- (Serbia) Petar Arsić
- (Serbia) Mlađan Šilobad
- (United States) Demetrius Alexander
- (United States) Gary Alexander
- (United States) Andrew Andrews
- (United States) Rashid Atkins
- (United States) Joe Binion
- (United States) Brandon Bowman
- (United States) Michael Cobbins
- (United States) Greg Cook
- (United States) Keron DeShields
- (United States) Chris Dowe
- (United States) Corey Gaines
- (United States) Will Graves
- (United States) Steve Hood
- (United States) Jermaine Jackson
- (United States) Davon Jefferson
- (United States) Kalin Lucas
- (United States) Devyn Marble
- (United States) Tony Mitchell
- (United States) Randy Owens
- (United States) Doron Perkins
- (United States) Kevinn Pinkney
- (United States) Carlos Powell
- (United States) Brian Randle
- (United States) Jason Rich
- (United States) Frank Robinson
- (United States) René Rougeau
- (United States) Ben Strong
- (United States) James Thomas
- (United States) Bernard Thompson
- (United States) Tyler Wilkerson
- (United States) James Young
- (Venezuela) Néstor Colmenares
- (Venezuela) Gregory Vargas
- (Venezuela) (United States) Donta Smith

== Accomplishments per season ==
Accomplishments per season
Season	League									State Cup	League Cup	Europe		Head coach['s]
Season	Division	Pld	W	L	PF	PA	PD	Pos	Playoff	State Cup	League Cup	Europe		Head coach['s]
1953/1954	Liga Artzit										Not held	DNQ		(Israel) Nethanel Sneh
1955	Liga Artzit										Not held	DNQ		(Israel) Mordechai Mamran
1955/1956	Cancelled due to Suez Crisis										Not held	DNQ		
1957	Liga Artzit										Not held	DNQ		(Israel) Zvi Ornstein
1957/1958	Liga Artzit										Not held	DNQ		(Israel) Peter Benedek
1958/59/60	Liga Artzit										Not held	DNQ		(Israel) Peter Benedek, (Israel) Yousef Abu Rashed
1960/1961	Liga Alef										Not held	DNQ		
1961/1962	Liga Leumit										Not held	DNQ		(Israel) Abraham Tor
1962/1963	Liga Leumit										Not held	DNQ		(Israel) Abraham Tor
1963/1964	Liga Leumit										Not held	DNQ		(Israel) Haim Chanin
1964/1965	Liga Leumit										Not held	DNQ		(Israel) Haim Chanin
1965/1966	Liga Leumit										Not held	DNQ		(Israel) Shmuel Yakobson
1966/1967	Liga Leumit										Not held	DNQ		(Israel) Shmuel Yakobson
1967/1968	Liga Leumit										Not held	DNQ		(Israel) Shlomo Duvdavani
1968/1969	Liga Leumit										Not held	DNQ		(Israel) Yousef Abu Rashed
1969/1970	Liga Leumit										Not held	DNQ		(Israel) Haim Chanin, (Israel) Aryeh Doidsko, (Israel) Itzhak Rubinstein
1970/1971	Liga Leumit										Not held	DNQ		(Israel) Itzhak Rubinsteinm, (Israel) Shmuel Yakobson
1971/1972	Liga Leumit										Not held	Winners' Cup	First round	(Israel) Abraham Tor, (Israel) Haim Buchbinder
1972/1973	Liga Leumit										Not held	DNQ		(Israel) Haim Buchbinder, (Israel) Eli Manana
1974	Liga Artzit										Not held	DNQ		
1974/1975	Liga Leumit										Not held	DNQ		(Israel) Haim Buchbinder
1975/1976	Liga Leumit										Not held	DNQ		(Israel) Shlomo Duvdavani, (Israel) Haim Buchbinder
1976/1977	Liga Leumit										Not held	DNQ		(Israel) Haim Buchbinder
1977/1978	Liga Leumit										Not held	DNQ		(Israel) Rahamim Nakash, (Israel) Shlomo Duvdavani, (Israel) Rani Isaac
1978/1979	Liga Artzit										Not held	DNQ		
1979/1980	Liga Artzit										Not held	DNQ		
1980/1981	Liga Leumit										Not held	DNQ		(Israel) Mordechai Lederman
1981/1982	Liga Leumit										Not held	DNQ		(Israel) Simi Riger, (Israel) Kalman Rozenberg
1982/1983	Liga Leumit										Not held	DNQ		(Israel) Kalman Rozenberg, (Israel) Micha Rab
1983/1984	Liga Leumit										Not held	DNQ		(Israel) Pini Gershon
1984/1985	Liga Leumit										Not held	DNQ		(Israel) Pini Gershon
1985/1986	Liga Leumit										Not held	Winners' Cup	Second round	(United States) Fran O'Hanlon
1986/1987	Liga Leumit										Not held	DNQ		(Israel) Pini Gershon
1987/1988	Liga Leumit										Not held	Korać Cup	Second round	(Israel) Yossi Harari, (Israel) Haim Buchbinder
1988/1989	Liga Leumit										Not held	DNQ		(Israel) Pini Gershon
1989/1990	Liga Leumit										Not held	DNQ		(Israel) Rani Kahana
1990/1991	Liga Leumit										Not held	DNQ		(Israel) Rani Kahana
1991/1992	Liga Leumit										Not held	DNQ		(Israel) Yariv Varshitzki, (Israel) Roni Barshats
1992/1993	Leumit A										Not held	Korać Cup	Second round	(Israel) Roni Barshats, (Israel) Ari Rosenberg
1993/1994	Leumit B										Not held	DNQ		
1994/1995	Leumit B										Not held	DNQ		
1995/1996	Leumit B										Not held	DNQ		
1996/1997	Liga Artzit									Not participating	Not held	DNQ		
1997/1998	Leumit B										Not held	DNQ		
1998/1999	Leumit A										Not held	DNQ		(Israel) Avi Ashkenazi
1999/2000	Leumit A										Not held	Korać Cup	Third round	(Israel) Avi Ashkenazi, (Israel) Yariv Varshitzki
2000/2001	Ligat HaAl										Not held	DNQ		(Israel) Effi Birnbaum
2001/2002	Ligat HaAl										Not held	DNQ		(Israel) Effi Birnbaum
2002/2003	Ligat HaAl										Not held	DNQ		(Israel) Meir Kaminski, (Israel) Yariv Varshitzki
2003/2004	Ligat HaAl										Not held	DNQ		(Israel) Erez Bitman, (Israel) Zvika Horovitz, (Israel) Ofer Berkovich
2004/2005	Ligat HaAl										Not held	DNQ		(Israel) Erez Bitman, (Israel) Yariv Varshitzki
2005/2006	Liga Artzit									Not participating	Not held	DNQ		(Israel) Toby Salilat
2006/2007	Liga Artzit									Not participating	DNQ	DNQ		(Israel) Toby Salilat
2007/2008	Liga Leumit										DNQ	DNQ		(Israel) Avi Ashkenazi
2008/2009	Ligat HaAl										DNQ	DNQ		(Israel) Avi Ashkenazi
2009/2010	Ligat HaAl										3rd	DNQ		(Israel) Avi Ashkenazi
2010/2011	Ligat HaAl										DNQ	EuroChallenge	Last16	(Israel) Elad Hasin, (Israel) Ami Nawi, (Israel) Mickey Gorka
2011/2012	Ligat HaAl										DNQ	DNQ		(Israel) Mickey Gorka, (Israel) Rami Hadar, (Israel) Offer Rahimi
2012/2013	Ligat HaAl										Semifinal	DNQ		(United States) Brad Greenberg
2013/2014	Ligat HaAl										Withdrew	EuroCup	Last32	(Israel) Danny Franco
2014/2015	Ligat HaAl										Quarterfinal	Withdrew		(Israel) Rami Hadar
2015/2016	Ligat HaAl										Quarterfinal	DNQ		(Israel) Rami Hadar
2016/2017	Ligat HaAl										Quarterfinal	DNQ		(Israel) Offer Rahimi
2017/2018	Ligat HaAl										Withdrew	Withdrew		(Israel) Offer Rahimi, (Israel) Nati Cohen, (Israel) Barak Peleg
2018/2019	Liga Leumit										Withdrew	DNQ		(Israel) Barak Peleg, (Venezuela) Daniel Seoane
2019/2020	Ligat HaAl										First round	DNQ		(Venezuela) Daniel Seoane
2020/2021	Ligat HaAl										Quarterfinal	BIBL League	First round	(Venezuela) Daniel Seoane, (Israel) Amit Ben David
2021/2022	Liga Leumit									Not participating	Semifinal	BIBL League	Runners-up	(Israel) Avi Suker, (Israel) Offer Rahimi
2022/2023	Liga Leumit	In Process								Not participating	Quarterfinal	DNQ		(Israel) Offer Rahimi
Season	League									State Cup	League Cup	Europe		Head coach['s]
Season	Division	Pld	W	L	PF	PA	PD	Pos	Playoff	State Cup	League Cup	Europe		Head coach['s]

First Tier
Second Tier
Third Tier

- FR = First Round
- SR = Second Round
- R16 = Round of 16
- QF = Quarter-Final
- SF = Semi-Final
- DNP = Do not play
- DNQ = Do not qualify

== Maccabi Haifa in European competitions ==
=== First Qualified ===
In the 1971/1972 season, Maccabi Haifa participated for the first time in European competitions when it qualified for the FIBA European Cup Winners' Cup due to having qualified for the Israeli Final cup 1970/1971. Maccabi was eliminated after the first round, in which it lost to the French side Denain Voltaire .

Round	Opponent	1st leg	2nd leg	Aggregate
First round	(France) Denain Voltaire	82-109 (H)	76-91 (A)	158–200

=== Second Qualified and First Win ===
In the 1985/1986 season, it qualified again for the FIBA European Cup Winners' Cup due to having qualified for the Israeli Final cup 1984/1985 in the first round, and defeated ENAD Ayiou Dometiou from Cyprus after winning in both games, in the first leg 125-58 and in the second leg 94–55. In the second round it lost to Jugoplastika from the Republic of Yugoslavia

Round	Opponent	1st leg	2nd leg	Aggregate
First round	(Cyprus) ENAD Ayiou Dometiou	125-58(A)	94-55 (H)	219-113
Second round	(Socialist Federal Republic of Yugoslavia) Jugoplastika	78-114 (A)	55-94 (H)	164-201

=== Korać Cup ===
In the 1987/1986 season, it qualified for the first time for the Korać Cup after defeating Achilleas Kaimakli from Cyprus 217–90 in aggregate (96–49 in the first leg, and 121–41 in the second leg). In the second round it defeated ASVEL Basket in the first leg, but lost in the second and was eliminated.

Round	Opponent	1st leg	2nd leg	Aggregate
First round	(Cyprus) Achilleas Kaimakli	96-49 (A)	121-41 (H)	217-90
Second round	(France) ASVEL Basket	103-89 (H)	75-93 (A)	178-182

In the 1992/1993 season, the team once again participated in the Korać Cup, and qualified directly for the second round, and was eliminated by Gravelines-Dunkerque from France after it lost in both legs (86–90 loss at home, and 60–81 away).

Round	Opponent	1st leg	2nd leg	Aggregate
Second round	(France) Gravelines-Dunkerque	86-90 (H)	60-81 (A)	146–171

=== Group stage ===
In the 1999/2000 season it qualified for the first time for the main tournament after beating the Cypriot team Keravnos (draw 67–67 in the first game away, and a 57–66 win away). Maccabi was a draw for Group C with Pallacanestro Reggiana from Italy and Nikol Fert from Macedonia (KK Beopetrol from the Republic of Yugoslavia withdrew from the competition). The team finished in first place with three wins against one loss and qualified for the quarterfinals, where they lost to Italian Pepsi Rimini 127–139 in aggregate.

Round	Opponent	1st leg	2nd leg	Aggregate
First round	(Cyprus) Keravnos	67–67 (A)	66-57 (H)	133-124
Group stage	(North Macedonia) Nikol Fert Gostivar	72-45 (H)	92-86 (A)	
Group stage	(Italy) Bipop Carire Reggiana	80-65 (H)	69-70 (A)	
Quarter Finals	(Italy) Pepsi Rimini	61-81 (A)	66-58 (H)	127-139

=== EuroChallenge ===
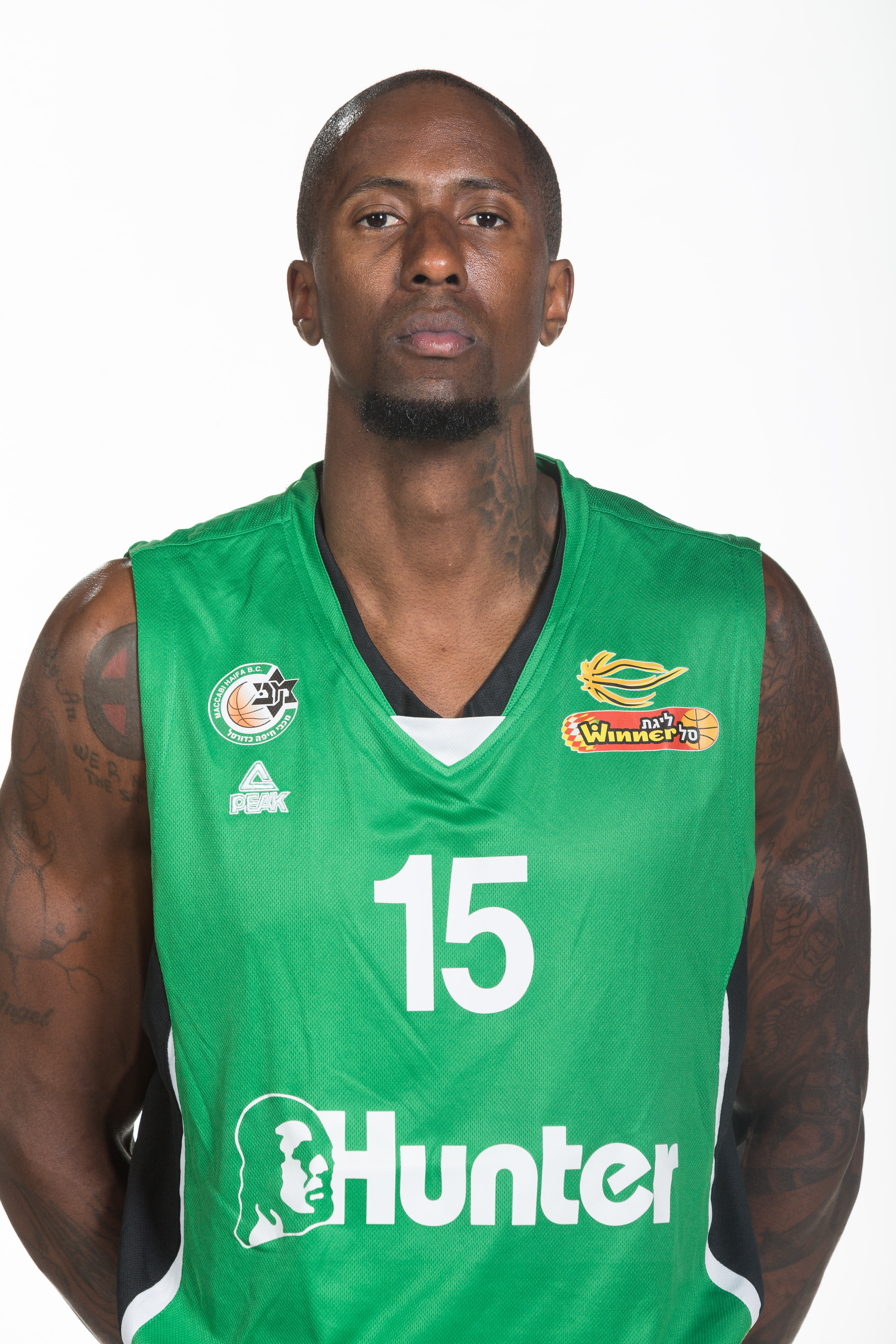
Brandon Bowman

In the 2010/2011 season, the team participated in the EuroChallenge Cup (which was the 3rd-tier level men's professional continental club basketball competition in Europe). It qualified for the main tournament by beating Paris-Levallois Basket in the qualifying round after it lost 63–75 in the first leg in Paris, and in the second leg won 89-66 (152–141 in aggregate). The team was placed in Group B with Skyliners Frankfurt from Germany, BK Ventspils from Latvia, and the Ukraine team Khimik Yuzhne. The team finished in second place with three wins against three losses and qualified for the last 16 stage where the teams was drawn with the Israeli team Barak Netanya, Academic Sofia from Bulgaria, and Spartak Saint Petersburg from Russia, and was eliminated after it finished in third place with two wins and four losses.

Round	Opponent	1st leg	2nd leg	Aggregate
Qualifying Round	(France) Paris Levallois	63-75 (A)	89-66 (H)	152-141
Regular season	(Germany) Skyliners Frankfurt	83-78 (A)	54-53 (H)	
Regular season	(Latvia) BK Ventspils	80-86 (H)	62-99 (A)	
Regular season	(Ukraine) Khimik Yuzhne	81-77 (A)	75-82 (H)	
Last 16	(Bulgaria) PBC Academic	78-95 (H)	69-87 (A)	
Last 16	(Israel) Barak Netanya	80-73 (A)	74-77 (H)	
Last 16	(Russia) Saint Petersburg	60-101 (A)	86–92 (H)	

=== EuroCup ===
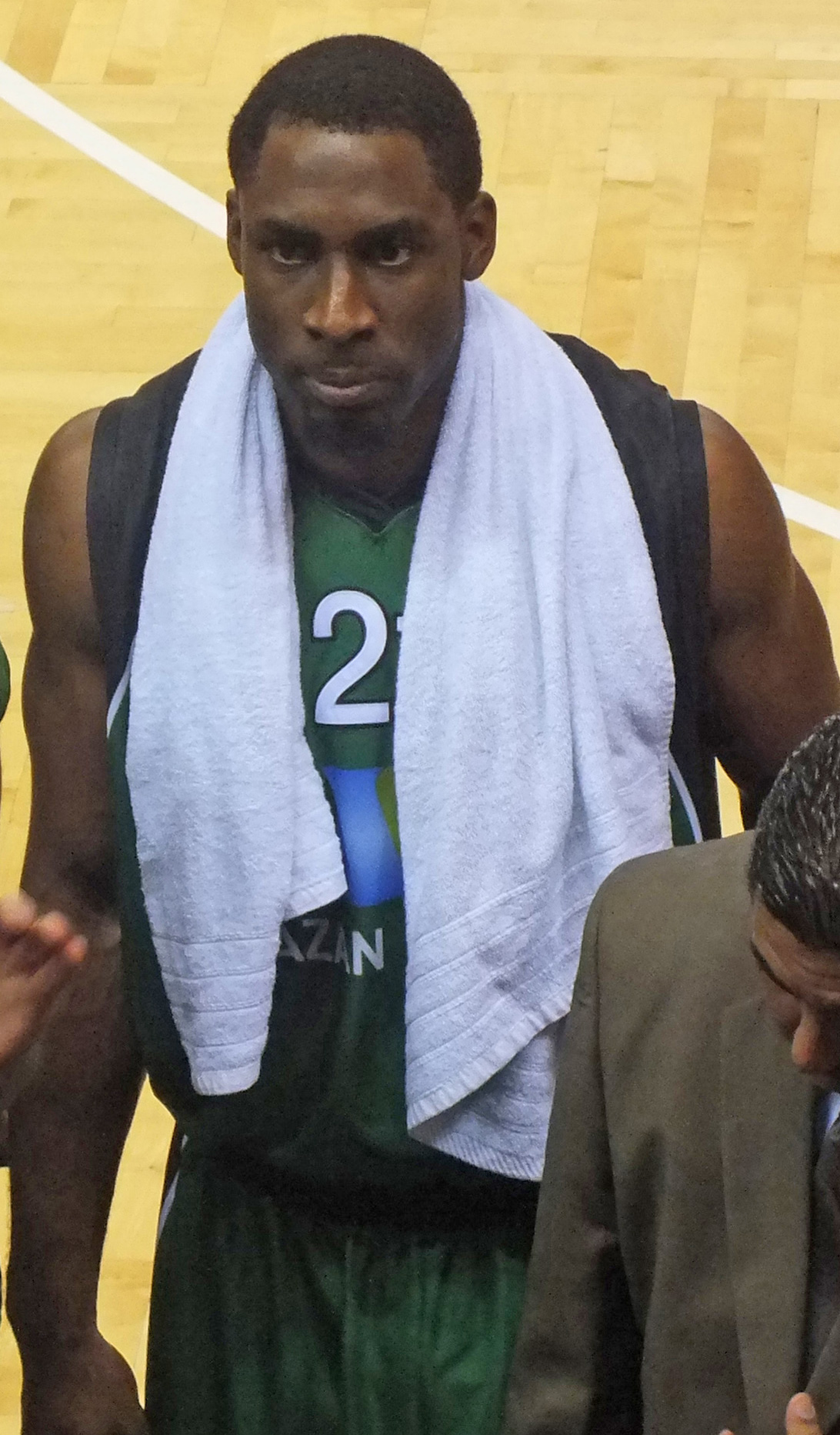
Ike Ofoegbu

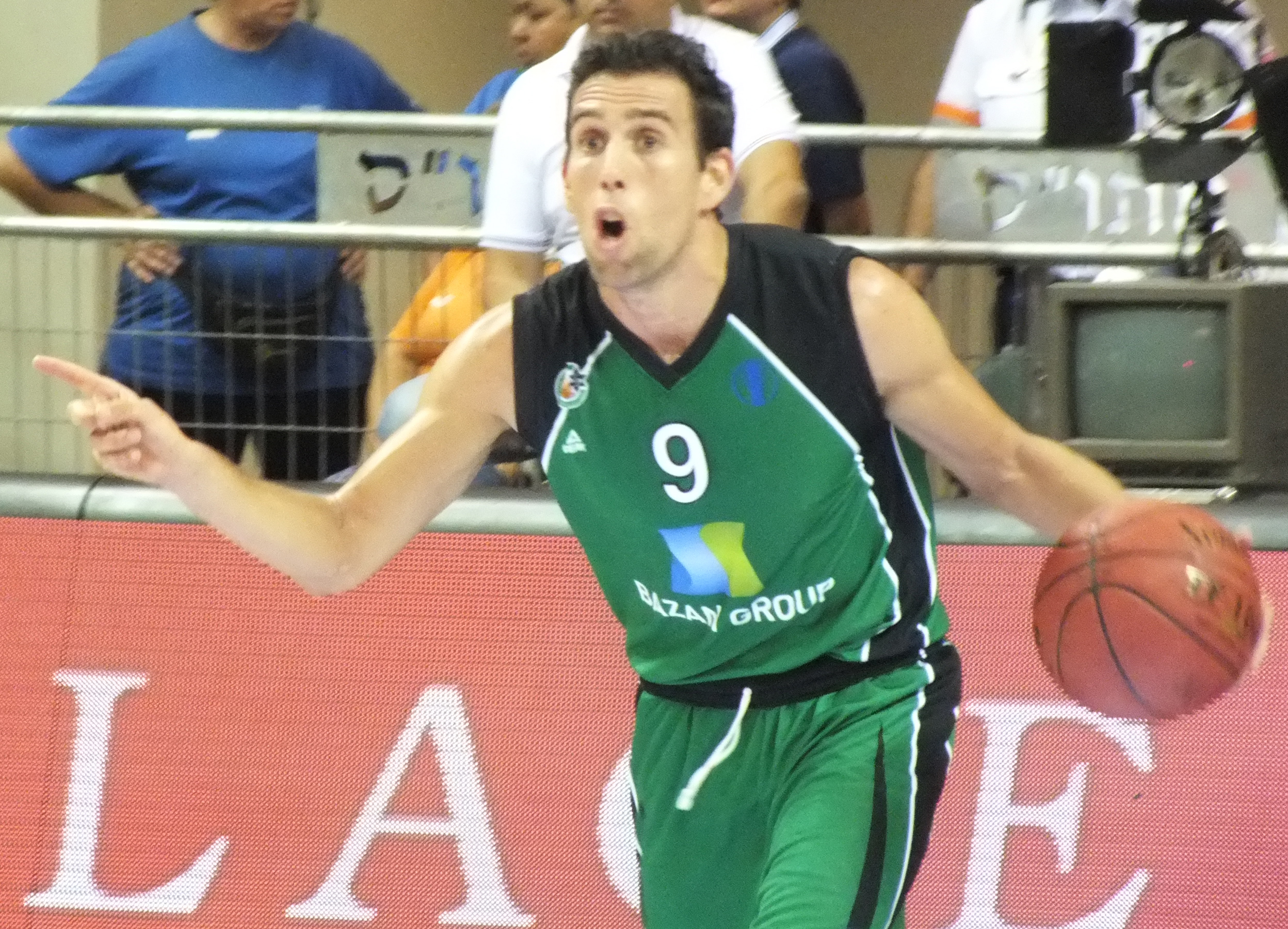
Moran Roth

After winning a historic championship the previous season and choosing not to participate in the Euroleague qualifiers in the 2013/2014 season, the team participated in the EuroCup in the regular season and was drawn into Group G with the Russian Unicas Kazan, Banvit Bandırma from Turkey, VEF Rīga (Latvia), MZT Skopje (Macedonia), and also Kalev/Vremo (Estonia).

The team finished in second place with six wins against four losses and qualified for the last 32 stage where the teams was drawn with the Montepaschi Siena from Italy, BC Khimki Moscow Region from Russia, and the Czech team ERA Nymburk. The team won twice (including an 86-66 vs Montepaschi Siena, but was eliminated due to its head-to-head record.

Round	Opponent	1st leg	2nd leg	Aggregate
Regular season	(Russia) BC UNICS	67-75 (H)	58-79 (A)	
Regular season	(North Macedonia) KK MZT Skopje	86-83 (A)	79-60 (H)	
Regular season	(Latvia) BK VEF Rīga	94-73 (A)	74-72 (H)	
Regular season	(Turkey) Banvit Bandırma	72-69 (H)	76-95 (A)	
Regular season	(Estonia) BC Kalev/Cramo	68-64 (A)	70-75 (H)	
Last 32	(Czech Republic) ČEZ Nymburk	80-75 (H)	53-68 (A)	
Last 32	(Russia) BC Khimki	48-87 (A)	66-86 (H)	
Last 32	(Italy) Montepaschi Siena	86-66 (H)	73-92 (A)	

=== Balkan League ===
12 teams from Israel joined the league, after suspension of the league due to the COVID-19 pandemic. The team was drawn into Norte Group B with Ironi Nahariya and Hapoel Gilboa Galil; it lost against Ironi Nahariya, and was eliminated.

Round	Opponent	1st leg	2nd leg	Aggregate
Regular season	(Israel) Ironi Nahariya	80-86 (H)	81-87 (A)	
Regular season	(Israel) Hapoel Gilboa Galil	81-92 (A)	82-86 (H)	

== Matches against NBA teams ==
3 October 2010

Boxscore

New Jersey Nets (United States)	108–70	(Israel) Maccabi Haifa

(United States) Prudential Center, Newark, New Jersey

11 October 2012

Boxscore

Golden State Warriors (United States)	108–100	(Israel) Maccabi Haifa

(United States) Oracle Arena, Oakland, California

16 October 2012

Boxscore

Minnesota Timberwolves (United States)	114–81	(Israel) Maccabi Haifa

(United States) Target Center, Minnesota, Minneapolis

7 October 2013

Boxscore

Phoenix Suns (United States)	130–89	(Israel) Maccabi Haifa

(United States) Talking Stick Resort, Phoenix, Arizona

8 October 2013

Boxscore

Detroit Pistons (United States)	91–69	(Israel) Maccabi Haifa

(United States) The Palace of Auburn Hills, Detroit, Michigan

13 October 2013

Boxscore

Memphis Grizzlies (United States)	116–70	(Israel) Maccabi Haifa

(United States) FedExForum, Memphis, Tennessee

15 October 2014

Boxscore

Washington Wizards (United States)	101–95	(Israel) Maccabi Haifa

(United States) Verizon Center, Washington, D.C.

17 October 2014

Boxscore

Portland Trail Blazers (United States)	121–74	(Israel) Maccabi Haifa

(United States) Moda Center, Portland, Oregon

18 October 2014

Boxscore

Sacramento Kings (United States)	91–59	(Israel) Maccabi Haifa

(United States) ARCO Arena, Sacramento, California

22 October 2014

Boxscore

Toronto Raptors (Canada)	92–85	(Israel) Maccabi Haifa

Air Canada Centre, Toronto, Ontario

8 October 2015

Boxscore

Memphis Grizzlies (United States)	97–84	(Israel) Maccabi Haifa

(United States) FedExForum, Memphis, Tennessee

11 October 2015

Boxscore

Los Angeles Lakers (United States)	126–83	(Israel) Maccabi Haifa

(United States) Staples Center, Los Angeles, California

10 October 2016

Boxscore

Sacramento Kings (United States)	135–96	(Israel) Maccabi Haifa

(United States) Golden 1 Center, Sacramento, California

4 October 2017

Boxscore

Utah Jazz (United States)	117–78	(Israel) Maccabi Haifa

(United States) Vivint Smart Home Arena, Salt Lake City, Utah

10 October 2017

Boxscore

Indiana Pacers (United States)	108–89	(Israel) Maccabi Haifa

(United States) Bankers Life Fieldhouse, Indianapolis, Indiana

13 October 2017

Boxscore

Portland Trail Blazers (United States)	129–81	(Israel) Maccabi Haifa

(United States) Moda Center, Portland, Oregon

8 October 2018

Boxscore

Sacramento Kings (United States)	132–100	(Israel) Maccabi Haifa

(United States) Golden 1 Center, Sacramento, California

11 October 2018

Boxscore

Los Angeles Clippers (United States)	124–76	(Israel) Maccabi Haifa

(United States) Staples Center, Los Angeles, California

6 October 2019

Boxscore

Memphis Grizzlies (United States)	123–88	(Israel) Maccabi Haifa

(United States) FedExForum, Memphis, Tennessee

10 October 2019

Boxscore

Portland Trail Blazers (United States)	104–68	(Israel) Maccabi Haifa

(United States) Moda Center, Portland, Oregon

13 October 2019

Boxscore

Minnesota Timberwolves (United States)	131–101	(Israel) Maccabi Haifa

(United States) Target Center, Minnesota, Minneapolis
