= Israeli Basketball Association =

Governing body for basketball in Israel

- איגוד הכדורסל בישראל
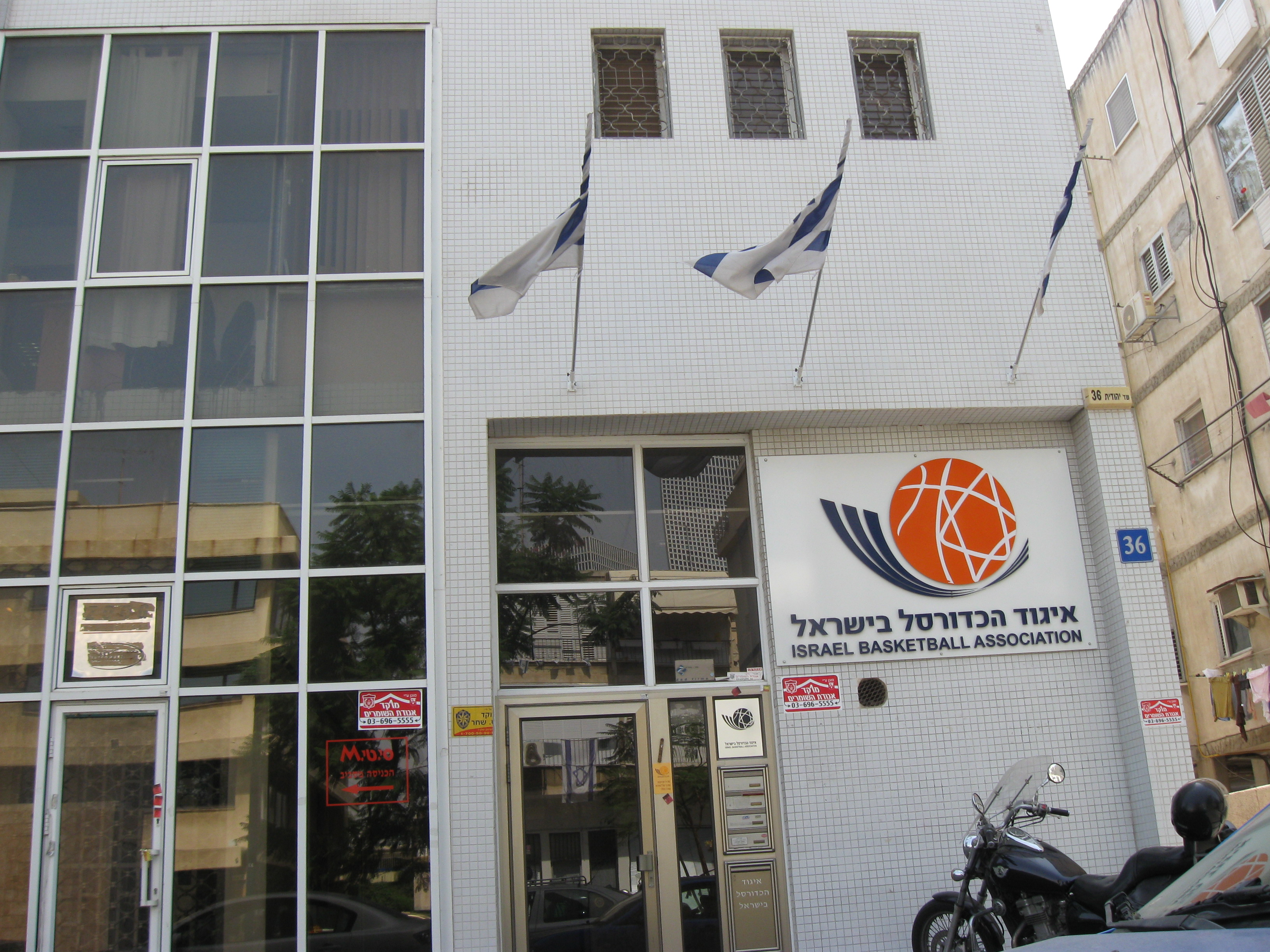
- Sport: Basketball
- Jurisdiction: Israel
- Founded: 1966; 60 years ago
- Headquarters: Tel Aviv

IBBA Logo Designed in 1972 by graphic artist Kanan Abramson

The Israeli Basketball Association (IBBA, Hebrew: איגוד הכדורסל בישראל) is the official organization of professional basketball in Israel.

== History ==
The organization oversees the regulation of the sport, team and player registration, rules of the game, various official (such as referees and statisticians) certification, and the National team. It is responsible for sanctioning official leagues at various levels, issuing league schedules, and certifying match results. The IBA also handles associating with international bodies such as FIBA and Euroleague Basketball (who organizes the EuroLeague).

In 2017 Amos Frishman was the Chairman of the Israel Basketball Association professional committee.

== See also ==
- Israeli Basketball Premier League
- Liga Leumit (basketball)
- Liga Artzit (basketball)
- Israeli Basketball State Cup
- Basketball in Israel
