= Maccabi Rehovot B.C. =

Israeli professional basketball club

Maccabi Ironi Rehovot
- Leagues: Liga Leumit
- Founded: 1950; 76 years ago
- Arena: Barzily
- Capacity: 500
- Location: Rehovot, Israel
- Team colors: Blue, white
- President: Asaf Frank
- Head coach: Yaniv Burger
Home	Away

Maccabi Ironi Rehovot (Hebrew: מכבי עירוני רחובות) is an Israeli professional basketball club, based in Rehovot, central Israel. The team plays in the Liga Leumit, the second tier.

== History ==
Maccabi Rehovot was founded in 1950 and played in the Liga Artzit (the third-tier division). During the nineties, Rehovot was coached by Moti Aroesti, a former Maccabi Tel Aviv player, and played in the Liga Leumit.

In the 2015–16 season, Rehovot was promoted to the Liga Leumit for the first time in 17 years.

In the 2017–18 season, Rehovot reached the Liga Leumit Semifinals as the third seed but eventually lost to Maccabi Kiryat Gat.

In the 2018–19 season, Rehovot have been relegated to the Liga Artzit, the third tier of the Israeli Basketball.

== Season by season ==
Season	Tier	League	Pos	Israeli State Cup
2015–16	3	Liga Artzit	1st	
2016–17	2	Liga Leumit	6th	Round of 16
2017–18	2	Liga Leumit	3rd	Round of 16
2018–19	2	Liga Leumit	13th	

== Current roster ==
Maccabi Rehovot roster
Players	Coaches
Pos. / No. / Nat. / Name / Ht. / Age; G/F / 21 / (Israel) / Levi, Gilad / 1.93 m (6 ft 4 in) / 38 – 29 January 1988	Head coach: (Israel) Yaniv Burger; Assistant coach(es): (Israel); Legend: (C) Team captain; Injured
