= A.S. Ramat HaSharon =

Israeli professional basketball club

אגודת ספורט רמת השרון Agudat Sport Ramat HaSharon
- Leagues: Israeli National League
- Founded: 1980; 46 years ago
- Arena: Oranim (capacity 900)
- Location: Ramat HaSharon, Israel
- Team colors: Black and White
- President: Aric Doron
- Head coach: Guy Kantor
Home	Away

A.S. Ramat HaSharon (Hebrew: א.ס. רמת השרון) is a professional basketball club based in Ramat HaSharon, Israel. The club is currently a member of the Israeli National League.

== History ==
The club was founded in 1980. Its colors are black and white.

It first participated in the Super League in the 1989–90 season, remaining in the top division until 1992. The club had a second spell in the Super League between 2002 and 2006. Its best season was in 2003–04 when it finished eighth and qualified for the playoffs, losing 3–0 to Maccabi Tel Aviv.

Following relegation at the end of the 2005–06 season the club folded and reformed in the bottom division. At the end of the 2008–09 season it was promoted to Liga Artzit. It returned to Liga Leumit in 2013 after being promoted from Liga Artzit. Guy Kantor is its head coach.

== Notable former players ==
- Ari Rosenberg
- Howard Lassoff
