= 2022–23 Israeli Basketball National League =

Israeli Basketball National League
- Season: 2022–23
- Dates: 11 October 2022 – May 2023
- Teams: 14

Regular season
- Relegated: Hapoel Ramat Gan Givatayim; Hapoel Hevel Modi'in

Finals
- Champions: Maccabi Ironi Ramat Gan
- Runners-up: Hapoel Afula
- Semifinalists: Elitzur Netanya; Elitzur Eito Ashkelon

The 2022-2023 Israeli Basketball National League was the 24th season with the league functioning as the second tier league since the re-alignment in 2000 and the 69th season of second-tier basketball in Israel.

== Teams ==
The following teams have changed division since the 2021–2022 season.

=== To Liga Leumit ===
Promoted from Liga Artzit

- Elitzur Shomron (North Division)
- Maccabi Rehovot (South Division)

Relegated from Premier League

- Maccabi Rishon LeZion

=== From Liga Leumit ===
Promoted to Premier League

- Ironi Kiryat Ata

Relegated to Liga Artzit

- Maccabi Hod HaSharon
- Maccabi Ashdod
- Hapoel Migdal HaEmek/Jezreel

=== Venues and locations ===
League Map

Team	City	Arena	Capacity
A.S. Ramat HaSharon	Ramat HaSharon	Kiryat Yearim Hall	900
Elitzur Eito Ashkelon	Ashkelon	Ashkelon Sports Arena	3,000
Elitzur Netanya	Netanya	Yeshurun Hall	1,000
Elitzur Shomron	Shomron Regional Council	Leader Sport Center, Ganei Tikva	1,000
Hapoel Afula	Afula	Nir Ha'emak Hall	1,000
Hapoel Hevel Modi'in	Hevel Modi'in Regional Council	Nahshon Hall, Shoham	370
Hapoel Ramat Gan Givatayim	Ramat Gan and Givatayim	Zisman Hall	1,500
Ironi Nahariya	Nahariya	Ein Sara Sport Hall	2,500
Ironi Ra'anana	Ra'anana	Metro West	1,668
Maccabi Haifa	Haifa	Romema Arena	5,000
Maccabi Ma'ale Adumim	Ma'ale Adumim	HaPais Hall	400
Maccabi Ironi Ramat Gan	Ramat Gan	Zisman Hall	1,500
Maccabi Rehovot	Rehovot	Barzilai Sports-Center	700
Maccabi Rishon LeZion	Rishon LeZion	Beit Maccabi Rishon	2,500

== Regular season ==
=== League table ===
Pos	Team	Pld	W	L	PF	PA	PD	Pts	Qualification or relegation
1	Hapoel Afula	26	19	7	2119	1945	+174	45	Advance to playoffs
2	Maccabi Ironi Ramat Gan	26	17	9	2105	2018	+87	43	Advance to playoffs
3	Elitzur Eito Ashkelon	26	17	9	2243	2156	+87	43	Advance to playoffs
4	Elitzur Netanya	26	17	9	2203	2066	+137	43	Advance to playoffs
5	Ironi Nahariya	26	16	10	2089	1921	+168	42	Advance to playoffs
6	Maccabi Rishon LeZion	26	16	10	2097	2028	+69	42	Advance to playoffs
7	A.S. Ramat HaSharon	26	14	12	2294	2305	−11	40	Advance to playoffs
8	Ironi Ra'anana	26	13	13	2206	2192	+14	39	Advance to playoffs
9	Maccabi Ma'ale Adumim	26	12	14	2092	2132	−40	38	Advance to playouts
10	Maccabi Haifa	26	11	15	2166	2229	−63	37	Advance to playouts
11	Maccabi Rehovot	26	9	17	2015	2106	−91	35	Advance to playouts
12	Elitzur Shomron	26	9	17	2093	2170	−77	35	Advance to playouts
13	Hapoel Hevel Modi'in	26	8	18	2132	2299	−167	34	Advance to playouts
14	Hapoel Ramat Gan Givatayim	26	4	22	2071	2358	−287	30	Advance to playouts

=== Rounds 1 to 26 ===
Home \ Away	ARH	EAS	ENE	ESH	HAF	HHM	HRG	IRN	IRA	MHA	MMA	IRG	MRH	MRL
A.S. Ramat HaSharon		81–85	81–76	93–91	99–86	118–80	71–83	81–95	80–93	104–94	98–93	93–104	98–92	74–92
Elitzur Eito Ashkelon	102–88		93–88	80–76	97–86	117–110	92–82	71–87	69–85	98–83	94–79	81–84	90–71	77–66
Elitzur Netanya	86–78	105–101		76–75	73–81	78–80	76–74	67–72	100–95	97–66	95–69	71–73	91–80	91–71
Elitzur Shomron	70–76	84–89	85–93		73–84	85–77	84–89	66–90	75–83	94–79	84–85	78–74	83–87	53–63
Hapoel Afula	93–78	79–76	79–82	76–68		85–92	104–82	79–69	81–70	92–69	77–84	74–63	78–57	71–60
Hapoel Hevel Modi'in	81–85	101–82	85–88	85–88	73–83		96–79	86–85	67–86	77–86	80–95	83–91	62–66	85–87
Hapoel Ramat Gan Givatayim	91–83	80–87	71–106	82–93	54–83	88–78		66–89	88–96	87–95	84–101	88–93	73–84	81–94
Ironi Nahariya	87–91	95–64	74–84	90–71	65–70	80–58	86–81		73–79	87–73	83–76	70–78	74–70	73–58
Ironi Ra'anana	106–111	83–88	65–77	88–98	93–89	101–105	87–85	78–76		96–79	73–70	78–90	101–96	80–90
Maccabi Haifa	105–103	85–69	95–73	77–78	89–95	84–89	98–75	70–85	66–59		82–98	87–69	91–77	95–85
Maccabi Ma'ale Adumim	82–67	63–91	76–104	88–94	75–82	102–63	111–85	70–65	72–87	89–78		44–87	73–75	84–71
Maccabi Ironi Ramat Gan	82–86	70–65	80–72	84–93	70–67	90–76	79–69	75–81	99–89	88–85	75–82		74–73	94–69
Maccabi Rehovot	78–92	74–88	77–80	78–72	72–77	79–84	88–82	81–84	82–74	69–74	86–66	79–70		73–89
Maccabi Rishon LeZion	78–85	70–97	90–74	104–82	62–68	91–79	104–71	78–74	86–81	96–81	72–65	85–69	86–71	

Legend: Blue = home team win; Red = away team win.
Matches with lighter background shading were decided after overtime.

== Playouts ==
Pos	Team	Pld	W	L	PF	PA	PD	Pts	Qualification or relegation	MHA	MMA	MRH	ESH	HHM	HRG
9	Maccabi Haifa	31	16	15	2682	2692	−10	47				120–97	95–92	94–83	
10	Maccabi Ma'ale Adumim	31	14	17	2520	2558	−38	45		89–92			63–85		99–72
11	Maccabi Rehovot	31	13	18	2413	2489	−76	44			84–68		74–67		76–62
12	Elitzur Shomron	31	12	19	2520	2569	−49	43						101–99	82–68
13	Hapoel Hevel Modi'in	31	9	22	2587	2761	−174	40	Relegation to Liga Artzit		93–109	66–67			
14	Hapoel Ramat Gan Givatayim	31	4	27	2466	2844	−378	35	Relegation to Liga Artzit	102–115				91–114	

== Playoffs ==
Quarterfinals
1	Hapoel Afula	80	83	75	82	82	3
8	Ironi Ra'anana	84	63	68	85	64	2
4	Elitzur Netanya	91	74	102	74	—	3
5	Ironi Nahariya	58	73	106	62	—	1
3	Elitzur Eito Ashkelon	75	66	82	77	84	3
6	Maccabi Rishon LeZion	61	75	78	86	58	2
2	Maccabi Ironi Ramat Gan	86	100	88	94	—	3
7	A.S. Ramat HaSharon	85	101	85	87	—	1

Semifinals
1	Hapoel Afula	80	67	77	69	78	3
4	Elitzur Netanya	62	85	65	85	68	2
2	Maccabi Ironi Ramat Gan	79	85	89	79	93	3
3	Elitzur Eito Ashkelon	76	87	78	83	81	2

Finals
1	Hapoel Afula	66
2	Maccabi Ironi Ramat Gan	69

=== Quarterfinals ===
Team 1	Series	Team 2	Game 1	Game 2	Game 3	Game 4	Game 5
Hapoel Afula	3–2	Ironi Ra'anana	80–84	83–63	75–68	82–85	82–64
Elitzur Netanya	3–1	Ironi Nahariya	91–58	74–73	102–106	74–62	—
Elitzur Eito Ashkelon	3–2	Maccabi Rishon LeZion	75–61	66–75	82–78	77–86	84–58
Maccabi Ironi Ramat Gan	3–1	A.S. Ramat HaSharon	86–85	100–101	88–85	94–87	—

==== Game 1 ====
7 April 2023	Hapoel Afula	80–84(OT) (Series: 0–1)	Ironi Ra'anana	Afula
14:00	Scoring by quarter: 19–20, 14–18, 20–19, 20–16, Overtime: 7–11
	Pts: Fitzpatrick 20; Rebs: Hall & Goldenberg 12; Asts: Asayag 7 PIR: Hall 26	Boxscore	Pts: Kanti 25; Rebs: Workman 10; Asts: Siggers 6 PIR: Kanti 36	Arena: Nir Ha'emak Hall; Attendance: 100

7 April 2023	Elitzur Eito Ashkelon	75–61 (Series: 1–0)	Maccabi Rishon LeZion	Ashkelon
13:00	Scoring by quarter: 17–21, 25–11, 14–18, 19–11
SPORT5	Pts: Tucker 31; Rebs: Tucker & Hadad 7 Asts: Gilinsky 5 PIR: Tucker 34	Boxscore	Pts: Riley 13; Rebs: Evans & Riley 7 Asts: Tishman 6 PIR: Evans 16	Arena: Ashkelon Sports Arena

8 April 2023	Maccabi Ironi Ramat Gan	86–85 (Series: 1–0)	A.S. Ramat HaSharon	Ramat Gan
19:45	Scoring by quarter: 19–23, 16–23, 26–20, 25–21
	Pts: Treadwell 24; Rebs: Treadwell 21; Asts: Treadwell 6 PIR: Treadwell 49	Boxscore	Pts: Watkins 28; Rebs: Watkins 10; Asts: Watkins 8 PIR: Watkins 35	Arena: Zisman Arena

9 April 2023	Elitzur Netanya	91–58 (Series: 1–0)	Ironi Nahariya	Netanya
21:00	Scoring by quarter: 22–17, 21–8, 23–18, 25–15
SPORT5	Pts: Borg & Saraf 23; Rebs: Aminu 9 Asts: Peleg 6 PIR: Lewis 29	Boxscore	Pts: White 11; Rebs: Chubrevich 7 Asts: Ohayon 5 PIR: White 12	Arena: Yeshurun Hall; Attendance: 150

==== Game 2 ====
10 April 2023	Ironi Ra'anana	63–83 (Series: 1–1)	Hapoel Afula	Ra'anana
19:00	Scoring by quarter: 24–24, 11–21, 16–17, 12–21
	Pts: Alber 16; Rebs: Workman 7 Asts: Sapir 5 PIR: Kanti 24	Boxscore	Pts: Netzia 19; Rebs: Goldenberg 9 Asts: Goldenberg 7 PIR: Goldenberg 24	Arena: Metro West

10 April 2023	Maccabi Rishon LeZion	75–66 (Series: 1–1)	Elitzur Eito Ashkelon	Rishon LeZion
19:30	Scoring by quarter: 21–21, 22–16, 18–16, 14–13
	Pts: Palatin 15; Rebs: Mor 10; Asts: Evans, Palatin 5 PIR: Palatin 22	Boxscore	Pts: Tucker 17; Rebs: Tucker 7 Asts: Ben David 5 PIR: Tucker 23	Arena: Beit Maccabi

11 April 2023	A.S. Ramat HaSharon	101–100 (Series: 1–1)	Maccabi Ironi Ramat Gan	Ramat HaSharon
13:30	Scoring by quarter: 24–31, 29–19, 24–29, 24–21
	Pts: Wideman 32; Rebs: Wideman 13; Asts: Watkins 11; PIR: Wideman 49	Boxscore	Pts: Capers 29; Rebs: Treadwell 14; Asts: Capers 11; PIR: Capers 33	Arena: Kiryat Yearim

12 April 2023	Ironi Nahariya	73–74 (Series: 0–2)	Elitzur Netanya	Nahariya
21:15	Scoring by quarter: 16–14, 21–26, 2418, 12–16
SPORT5 LIVE	Pts: White 20; Rebs: White 10; Asts: Ohayon 8 PIR: White 26	Boxscore	Pts: Sahar 19; Rebs: Robinson 7 Asts: Borg 5 PIR: Sahar 23	Arena: Ein Sara Sport Hall

==== Game 3 ====
14 April 2023	Hapoel Afula	75–68 (Series: 2–1)	Ironi Ra'anana	Afula
13:30	Scoring by quarter: 19–20, 9–14, 25–20, 22–14
SPORT5 PLUS	Pts: Asayag 16; Rebs: Fitzpatrick & Goldenberg 10; Asts: Goldenberg 6 PIR: Hall 22	Boxscore	Pts: Siggers 19; Rebs: Workman 9 Asts: Alber 4 PIR: Kanti 23	Arena: Nir Ha'emak Hall

15 April 2023	Elitzur Eito Ashkelon	82–78 (Series: 2–1)	Maccabi Rishon LeZion	Ashkelon
21:15	Scoring by quarter: 18–15, 11–17, 26–15, 27–31
	Pts: Tucker 22; Rebs: Gipson 8 Asts: Gilinsky 9 PIR: Tucker 20	Boxscore	Pts: Palatin 15; Rebs: Cohen 6 Asts: Palatin 6 PIR: Palatin 28	Arena: Ashkelon Sports Arena

15 April 2023	Maccabi Ironi Ramat Gan	88–85 (Series: 2–1)	A.S. Ramat HaSharon	Ramat Gan
19:55	Scoring by quarter: 17–18, 28–14, 17–20, 26–33
SPORT5 PLUS	Pts: Capers 21; Rebs: Treadwell 12; Asts: Treadwell & Dadon 4 PIR: Capers 26	Boxscore	Pts: Wideman 25; Rebs: Wideman 17; Asts: Watkins 9 PIR: Wideman 38	Arena: Zisman Arena

16 April 2023	Elitzur Netanya	102–106(OT) (Series: 2–1)	Ironi Nahariya	Netanya
18:15	Scoring by quarter: 18–23, 22–17, 23–14, 15–24, Overtime: 13–13, 11–15
	Pts: Borg 35; Rebs: Aminu 13; Asts: Borg 7 PIR: Borg 37	Boxscore	Pts: White 29; Rebs: White 9 Asts: Ohayon 17; PIR: White 33	Arena: Yeshurun Hall

==== Game 4 ====
18 April 2023	Ironi Ra'anana	85–82 (Series: 2–2)	Hapoel Afula	Ra'anana
20:00	Scoring by quarter: 13–23, 19–26, 34–16, 19–17
	Pts: Alber 25; Rebs: Workman 7 Asts: Sapir 7 PIR: Siggers 25	Boxscore	Pts: Asayag 26; Rebs: Fitzpatrick & Goldenberg 10; Asts: Asayag 6 PIR: Asayag 25	Arena: Metro West

18 April 2023	Maccabi Rishon LeZion	86–77 (Series: 2–2)	Elitzur Eito Ashkelon	Rishon LeZion
20:30	Scoring by quarter: 24–21, 24–15, 18–18, 20–23
SPORT5 STARS	Pts: Riley 23; Rebs: Mor 8 Asts: Armstrong 8 PIR: Riley 27	Boxscore	Pts: Tucker 21; Rebs: Gilinsky & Pitshon 10; Asts: Gilinsky 5 PIR: Rosenberg 21	Arena: Beit Maccabi

19 April 2023	A.S. Ramat HaSharon	87–94 (Series: 1–3)	Maccabi Ironi Ramat Gan	Ramat HaSharon
18:45	Scoring by quarter: 20–22, 24–27, 23–9, 20–36
SPORT5 PLUS	Pts: Watkins 20; Rebs: Wideman 9 Asts: Watkins 7 PIR: Watkins 23	Boxscore	Pts: Capers 24; Rebs: Treadwell 15; Asts: Aharoni 7 PIR: Hirsh 20	Arena: Kiryat Yearim

19 April 2023	Ironi Nahariya	62–74 (Series: 1–3)	Elitzur Netanya	Nahariya
19:30	Scoring by quarter: 19–20, 17–17, 15–22, 11–15
	Pts: Turner 13; Rebs: White 9 Asts: Ohayon 4 PIR: White & Turner 14	Boxscore	Pts: Robinson 23; Rebs: Robinson 12; Asts: Robinson, Aminu & Reuven 3 PIR: Robinson 30	Arena: Ein Sara Sport Hall

==== Game 5 ====
21 April 2023	Elitzur Eito Ashkelon	84–58 (Series: 3–2)	Maccabi Rishon LeZion	Ashkelon
14:50	Scoring by quarter: 19–12, 21–9, 22–18, 22–18
SPORT5 PLUS	Pts: Rosenberg 19; Rebs: Gilinsky 14; Asts: Gilinsky 8 PIR: Gilinsky 24	Boxscore	Pts: Armstrong 13; Rebs: Mor 8 Asts: Armstrong 4 PIR: Armstrong 16	Arena: Ashkelon Sports Arena

21 April 2023	Hapoel Afula	82–64 (Series: 3–2)	Ironi Ra'anana	Afula
15:00	Scoring by quarter: 15–21, 23–17, 20–12, 24–14
SPORT5 PLUS	Pts: Jorno 17; Rebs: Fitzpatrick 14; Asts: Jorno 6 PIR: Jorno 28	Boxscore	Pts: Alber 15; Rebs: Kanti 10; Asts: Sapir 6 PIR: Kanti & Alber 15	Arena: Nir Ha'emak Hall

=== Semifinals ===
Team 1	Series	Team 2	Game 1	Game 2	Game 3	Game 4	Game 5
Hapoel Afula	3–2	Elitzur Netanya	80–62	67–85	77–65	69–85	78–68
Maccabi Ironi Ramat Gan	3–2	Elitzur Eito Ashkelon	79–76	85–87	89–78	79–83	93–81

==== Game 1 ====
28 April 2023	Maccabi Ironi Ramat Gan	79–76 (Series: 1–0)	Elitzur Eito Ashkelon	Ramat Gan
14:00	Scoring by quarter: 12–18, 22–15, 27–25, 18–18
SPORT5 PLUS	Pts: Capers 21; Rebs: Treadwell 11; Asts: Capers 6 PIR: Capers 28	Boxscore	Pts: Tucker 21; Rebs: Gilinsky 7 Asts: Gilinsky 10; PIR: Gilinsky 26	Arena: Zisman Arena; Attendance: 250

30 April 2023	Hapoel Afula	80–62 (Series: 1–0)	Elitzur Netanya	Afula
21:00	Scoring by quarter: 15–17, 18–19, 27–19, 20–7
	Pts: Hall 25; Rebs: Fitzpatrick 12; Asts: Jorno 6 PIR: Fitzpatrick 30	Boxscore	Pts: Aminu 17; Rebs: Saraf 7 Asts: Borg 5 PIR: Aminu 19	Arena: Nir Ha'emak Hall

==== Game 2 ====
2 May 2023	Elitzur Eito Ashkelon	87–85 (Series: 1–1)	Maccabi Ironi Ramat Gan	Ashkelon
18:00	Scoring by quarter: 24–16, 19–18, 21–21, 23–30
	Pts: Tucker 23; Rebs: Gilinsky 8 Asts: Gilinsky 7 PIR: Rosenberg 25	Boxscore	Pts: Hirsh 18; Rebs: Treadwell 13; Asts: Treadwell & Aharoni 4 PIR: Hirsh 27	Arena: Ashkelon Sports Arena

3 May 2023	Elitzur Netanya	85–67 (Series: 1–1)	Hapoel Afula	Netanya
20:00	Scoring by quarter: 23–20, 9–11, 28–11, 25–25
	Pts: Aminu 18; Rebs: Robinson 6 Asts: Sahar 6 PIR: Sahar 27	Boxscore	Pts: Fitzpatrick 12; Rebs: Hall 9 Asts: Goldenberg 6 PIR: Goldenberg 14	Arena: Yeshurun Hall

==== Game 3 ====
5 May 2023	Maccabi Ironi Ramat Gan	89–78 (Series: 2–1)	Elitzur Eito Ashkelon	Ramat Gan
13:40	Scoring by quarter: 20–25, 29–9, 22–23, 18–21
	Pts: Hirsh & Dadon 16; Rebs: Treadwell 15; Asts: Cohen 6 PIR: Treadwell 30	Boxscore	Pts: Gipson 21; Rebs: Pitshon 8 Asts: Harush & Ben David 4 PIR: Gipson 24	Arena: Zisman Arena

7 May 2023	Hapoel Afula	77–65 (Series: 2–1)	Elitzur Netanya	Afula
19:40	Scoring by quarter: 17–19, 20–9, 15–13, 25–24
	Pts: Goldenberg 22; Rebs: Hall 9 Asts: Hall 8 PIR: Goldenberg 30	Boxscore	Pts: Borg 19; Rebs: Robinson 8 Asts: Lewis 5 PIR: Borg 20	Arena: Nir Ha'emak Hall

==== Game 4 ====
10 May 2023	Elitzur Netanya	85–69 (Series: 2–2)	Hapoel Afula	Netanya
	Scoring by quarter: 23–16, 16–23, 23–16, 23–14
	Pts: Saraf 21; Rebs: Robinson 11; Asts: Borg 6 PIR: Saraf 24	Boxscore	Pts: Hall 17; Rebs: Hall 11; Asts: Jorno 5 PIR: Goldenberg	Arena: Yeshurun Hall

15 May 2023	Elitzur Eito Ashkelon	83–79(OT) (Series: 2–2)	Maccabi Ironi Ramat Gan	Ashkelon
	Scoring by quarter: 10–17, 16–17, 20–17, 23–18, Overtime: 14–10
		Boxscore		Arena: Ashkelon Sports Arena
Note: originally scheduled for 9 May 2023 due to the 2023 Israel–Palestine crisis The league was postponed indefinitely.

==== Game 5 ====
14 May 2023	Hapoel Afula	78–68 (Series: 3–2)	Elitzur Netanya	Afula
	Scoring by quarter: 21–18, 25–24, 16–12, 16–14
		Boxscore		Arena: Nir Ha'emak Hall

18 May 2023	Maccabi Ironi Ramat Gan	93–81 (Series: 3–2)	Elitzur Eito Ashkelon	Ramat Gan
	Scoring by quarter: 27–24, 23–18, 24–23, 19–16
		Boxscore		Arena: Zisman Arena
Note: originally scheduled for 12 May 2023 due to the 2023 Israel–Palestine crisis The league was postponed indefinitely.

=== Final ===
22 May 2023	Hapoel Afula	66–69	Maccabi Ironi Ramat Gan	Afula
20:00	Scoring by quarter: 18–14, 19–23, 17–19, 12–13
SPORT5 PLUS		Boxscore		Arena: Nir Ha'emak Hall
