= 2022 Israeli Basketball National League Cup =

Sports season

Tournament details
- Country: Israel
- Dates: 22 October – 29 December 2022
- Teams: 14

Final positions
- Champions: Ironi Nahariya
- Runner-up: Elitzur Eito Ashkelon
- Semifinalists: Elitzur Netanya; Hapoel Afula

Tournament statistics
- Matches played: 13

Awards
- MVP: (United States) (Israel) Isaiah Eisendorf
- All statistics correct as of 24 August 2022.

The 2022 Israeli Basketball National League Cup was the 2nd edition of the Israeli Basketball National League Cup, organized by the Israel Basketball Association.

On 23 August, 2022, the Israel Basketball Association held the draw for the tournament. The tournament format consists of one-game elimination match.

== bracket ==
Round of 16
22 October, 20:30
Ironi Ra'anana	75
Elitzur Eito Ashkelon	83
21 October, 14:30
Maccabi Ironi Ramat Gan	88
A.S. Ramat HaSharon	80
21 October, 12:30
Elitzur Shomron	80
Maccabi Haifa	98
22 October, 20:30
Maccabi Rehovot	75
Elitzur Netanya	89
21 October, 12:00
Hapoel Ramat Gan Givatayim	71
Maccabi Rishon LeZion	70
22 October, 20:30
Hapoel Hevel Modi'in	105
Maccabi Ma'ale Adumim	101

Quarterfinals
8 November, 19:00
Elitzur Eito Ashkelon	89
Maccabi Ironi Ramat Gan	78
8 November, 19:45
Maccabi Haifa	70
Hapoel Afula	86
8 November, 19:30
Elitzur Netanya	99
Hapoel Ramat Gan Givatayim	71
8 November, 19:00
Hapoel Hevel Modi'in	69
Ironi Nahariya	96

Semifinals
20 December, 20:30
Elitzur Eito Ashkelon	87
Hapoel Afula	73
20 December, 18:00
Elitzur Netanya	80
Ironi Nahariya	86

Final
29 December, 19:30
Elitzur Eito Ashkelon	82
Ironi Nahariya	87

== Round of 16 ==
The round of 16 will take place on 22 October, 2022. Ironi Nahariya and Hapoel Afula automatically advanced to the quarterfinals.

22 October 2022	Maccabi Rehovot	75–89	Elitzur Netanya	Rehovot
20:30	Scoring by quarter: 12-18, 20-33, 16-22, 27-16
	Pts: Freund 16; Rebs: Wodds 9 Asts: Geva 5 PIR: Freund 20	Boxscore	Pts: Robinson 19; Rebs: Robinson 7 Asts: Reuvan 7 PIR: Robinson 20	Arena: Barzilai Sports-Center

22 October 2022	Hapoel Hevel Modi'in	105–101(OT)	Maccabi Ma'ale Adumim	Shoham
20:30	Scoring by quarter: 23-24, 24-23, 24-26, 21-19, Overtime: 13-9
	Pts: Gat 21; Rebs: Baloul 10; Asts: Treadwell 8 PIR: Treadwell 26	Boxscore	Pts: Acure 32; Rebs: Acure 9 Asts: Johnson 9 PIR: Acure 46	Arena: Nahshon Hall

22 October 2022	Ironi Ra'anana	75–83	Elitzur Eito Ashkelon	Ra'anana
20:45
	Pts: Siggers 19; Rebs: Workman 10; Asts: Leder 4 PIR: Siggers 24	Boxscore	Pts: Tucker 22; Rebs: Gilinsky 9 Asts: Gilinsky 6 PIR: Tucker 27	Arena: Metro West

21 October 2022	Hapoel Ramat Gan Givatayim	71–70	Maccabi Rishon LeZion	Ramat Gan
12:00	Scoring by quarter: 22-17, 17-21, 12-22, 20-10
	Pts: Lemon 25; Rebs: Warren 15; Asts: Gol 9 PIR: Lemon 29	Boxscore	Pts: Mor 20; Rebs: Cousins 11; Asts: Cousins 6 PIR: Cousins 25	Arena: Zisman Hall; Attendance: 120

21 October 2022	Elitzur Shomron	80–98	Maccabi Haifa	Ganei Tikva
12:30	Scoring by quarter: 25-24, 14-33, 18-21, 24-19
	Pts: Shterenberg 16; Rebs: Stone & Flaisher 6 Asts: Alon 6 PIR: Shterenberg 20	Boxscore	Pts: Gilder 24; Rebs: Parsons 8 Asts: Kozahinof 10; PIR: Parsons 28	Arena: Leader Sport Center; Attendance: 30

21 October 2022	Maccabi Ironi Ramat Gan	88–80	A.S. Ramat HaSharon	Ramat Gan
14:00	Scoring by quarter: 19-14, 23-20, 32-19, 14-27
	Pts: Altit 15; Rebs: Hirsh 7 Asts: Capers 6 PIR: Capers 24	Boxscore	Pts: Ferber 22; Rebs: Ferber 7 Asts: Hai 3 PIR: Ferber 24	Arena: Zisman Hall; Attendance: 200

== Quarterfinals ==
8 November 2022	Maccabi Haifa	70–86	Hapoel Afula	Haifa
19:45	Scoring by quarter: 23-23, 13-16, 21-26, 13-21
	Pts: Parsons & Malka 15; Rebs: Parsons 15; Asts: Parsons 7 PIR: Parsons 24	Boxscore	Pts: Asayag 24; Rebs: Hall 15; Asts: Hall 15; PIR: Hall 15	Arena: Romema Arena

8 November 2022	Hapoel Hevel Modi'in	69–96	Ironi Nahariya	Shoham
19:00	Scoring by quarter: 13-21, 20-18, 20-29, 16-28
	Pts: Gat 14; Rebs: Treadwell 8 Asts: Gat 10; PIR: Treadwell 22	Boxscore	Pts: White 20; Rebs: Ben-Yakov 10; Asts: Burnett 9 PIR: White 25	Arena: Nahshon Hall

8 November 2022	Elitzur Eito Ashkelon	89–78	Maccabi Ironi Ramat Gan	Ashkelon
19:00	Scoring by quarter: 25-16, 15-16, 27-25, 22-21
	Pts: Gipson 27; Rebs: Gipson & Gilinski 8 Asts: Gilinski 8 PIR: Gipson 34	Boxscore	Pts: Capers 19; Rebs: Altit 9 Asts: Capers 7 PIR: Capers 24	Arena: Ashkelon Sports Arena

8 November 2022	Elitzur Netanya	71–99	Hapoel Ramat Gan Givatayim	Netanya
19:30	Scoring by quarter: 26-15, 20-17, 25-26, 28-13
	Pts: Reuven 18; Rebs: Aminu 7 Asts: Scharf 6 PIR: Reuven 25	Boxscore	Pts: Warren 24; Rebs: Sommerfeld 6 Asts: Noyovitch 5 PIR: Warren 21	Arena: Yeshurun Hall

== Semifinals ==
20 December 2022	Elitzur Eito Ashkelon	87–73	Hapoel Afula	Ashkelon
20:30	Scoring by quarter: 18–22, 24–17, 22–21, 23–13
	Pts: Gipson 19; Rebs: Tucker 7 Asts: Gilinski 5 PIR: David 24	Boxscore	Pts: Three players 11; Rebs: Goldenberg 9 Asts: Hall & Zorno 4 PIR: Hall 16	Arena: Ashkelon Sports Arena

20 December 2022	Elitzur Netanya	80–86	Ironi Nahariya	Ramla
18:00	Scoring by quarter: 17–20, 14–25, 26–19, 23–22
	Pts: Butler 20; Rebs: Robinson 14; Asts: Butler 5 PIR: Butler 24	Boxscore	Pts: Burnett 24; Rebs: White 7 Asts: Ohayon 7 PIR: Burnett 25	Arena: Kiryat Menachem Hall

== Final ==
29 December 2022	Elitzur Eito Ashkelon	82–87	Ironi Nahariya	Rishon LeZion
19:30	Scoring by quarter: 24–24, 21–16, 13–26, 24–21
	Pts: Tucker 19; Rebs: Tucker 7 Asts: Gilinski 12; PIR: Tucker 24	Boxscore	Pts: Eisendorf 24; Rebs: White 9 Asts: Ohayon 10; PIR: White 33	Arena: Beit Maccabi Rishon

Starters:			Pts	Reb	Ast
F	5	(United States) Dakarai Tucker	19	7	3
F	8	(Israel) Sagiv David	8	6	2
G	10	(Israel) Gal Gilinski	14	4	12
F/C	42	(United States) Thomas Gipson	11	6	1
F	14	(Israel) Chen Guy	0	2	1
Reserves:					
PF	7	(Israel) Raviv Pitshon	9	5	0
G	35	(United States) Clarke Rosenberg	8	5	0
G	12	(Israel) Shlomi Harush	5	0	0
G	22	(Israel) Omer Ben David	8	0	1
G/F	1	(Israel) Eliran Hadad	0	0	0
SG	2	(Israel) Yanir Binyamin	0	0	0
Head coach:
(Israel) Avi Sukar

E. Ashkelon	I. Nahariya

E. Ashkelon	Statistics	I. Nahariya
16/39 (41%)	2 point field goals	22/31 (71%)
11/27 (40.7%)	3 point field goals	6/23 (26.1%)
17/24 (70.8%)	Free throws	25/44 (56.8%)
45	Rebounds	31
20	Assists	28
11	Steals	9
19	Turnovers	13
0	Blocks	2

Starters:			Pts	Reb	Ast
F/C	0	(United States) Romello White	23	9	3
PG	12	(Israel) Yogev Ohayon	6	3	10
F	2	(United States) Dominez Burnett	19	4	9
F	7	(United States) Isaiah Eisendorf	24	3	1
C	23	(Israel) Alexey Chubrevich	7	5	2
Reserves:					
F	1	(Israel) Ofek Ben-Yakov	2	3	1
G	13	(Israel) Dolev Drapic	2	1	1
G	6	(Israel) Omer Poleg	4	0	1
F	16	(Israel) Ohad Dekel	0	0	0
SG	25	(Israel) Adar Ein-Gal	DNP		
Head coach:
(Israel) Shay Segalovich

2022 National League Cup Winners
Ironi Nahariya
1st title
