= 2025–26 Israeli Basketball National League =

Israeli Basketball National League
- Season: 2025–26
- Teams: 16

Regular season
- Promoted: Ironi Eilat; Maccabi Ashdod
- Relegated: S.C. Zafed; Maccabi Ma'ale Adumim; Maccabi Haifa

Finals
- Champions: Ironi Eilat

Records
- Highest scoring: Maccabi Ashdod 125-121 S.C. Zafed
- Winning streak: Ironi Eilat (25)
- Losing streak: S.C. Zafed (12)

The 2025–2026 Israeli Basketball National League will be its 27th season as the second tier since its re-alignment in 2000 and the 72nd season of second-tier basketball in Israel.

== Format ==
The regular season be played in a 30 round (15 round-robin format). The winner will be promoted to the Premier League, while the 2nd to 9th ranked teams will advance to the playoff to determine the second team that will be promoted also. and the 10th to 16th ranked teams will advance to the Playout Group, the last three teams will be relegated to the Liga Artzit.

Due to the Twelve-Day War, the Liga Artzit was postponed indefinitely before the end of the season. The Israel Basketball Association decide to promote all four teams in the finals (2 from each district) to the National league.

== Teams ==
A total of 16 teams will contest the league, including nine sides from the 2024–25 season, two relegated from the Premier League and four promoted from the Liga Artzit.

Relegated from Premier League	Promoted to Premier League
Hapoel Haifa; ~~Elitzur Netanya~~ (Note: Following the dissolution of Hapoel Afula, Elitzur Netanya exercised its right to remain in the Premier League, which led to Maccabi Ma'ale Adumim's promotion to the National League after finishing third in the Liga Artzit.)	Maccabi Ironi Ra'anana; Maccabi Rishon LeZion
Promoted from Liga Artzit	Relegated to Liga Artzit
Maccabi Haifa (North Division); Maccabi Mendal Petah Tikva (North Division); Maccabi Ashdod (South Division); A.S. Kiryat Gat/Ashkelon (South Division); Maccabi Ma'ale Adumim (South Division)	Hapoel Kfar Saba; ~~Elitzur Shomron~~ (Note: Hapoel Bnei Kafr Qasem has informed the Israeli Basketball Association that it will not fulfill its place in the National League in the 2025–26 season, which led to Elitzur Shomron exercised its right to remain in the National League.); Hapoel Bnei Kafr Qasem

=== Venues and locations ===
League Map

Team	City	Arena	Capacity
A.S. Ironi Ashkelon	Ashkelon	Ashkelon Sports Arena	3,000
A.S. Kiryat Gat/Ashkelon	Kiryat Gat and Ashkelon	Kramim Sport Hall, Kiryat Gat	400
A.S. Ramat HaSharon	Ramat HaSharon	Kiryat Yearim Hall	900
Elitzur Shomron	Shomron Regional Council	Kafr Qasim Sport Hall, Kafr Qasim	500
Elitzur Yavne	Yavne	Ralf Klain Hall	930
Hapoel Haifa	Haifa	Romema Arena	5,000
Hapoel Migdal HaEmek/Jezreel	Migdal HaEmek and Jezreel Valley Regional Council	Yearot HaEmek, Migdal HaEmek	900
Ironi Eilat	Eilat	Begin Arena	1,490
Ironi Nahariya	Nahariya	Ein Sara Sport Hall	2,500
Maccabi Ashdod	Ashdod	HaKiriya Arena	2,200
Maccabi Haifa	Haifa	Romema Arena	5,000
Maccabi Ma'ale Adumim	Ma'ale Adumim	HaPais Hall Ma'ale Adumim	498
Maccabi Mendal Petah Tikva	Petah Tikva	Rozmarin Sport Hall	500
Maccabi Rehovot	Rehovot	Barzilai Sports Center	700
Otef Darom B.C.	Gaza Envelope	Rotem Hall, Magen	500
S.C. Zafed	Zafed	HaPais Hall Zafed	608

== Regular season ==
=== League table ===
Pos	Team	Pld	W	L	PF	PA	PD	Pts	Qualification or relegation
1	Ironi Eilat	30	29	1	2826	2342	+484	59	Promoted to the Premier League
2	Maccabi Rehovot	30	24	6	2646	2330	+316	54	Advance to the playoffs
3	Ironi Nahariya	30	23	7	2621	2350	+271	53	Advance to the playoffs
4	Hapoel Haifa	30	22	8	2601	2492	+109	52	Advance to the playoffs
5	Maccabi Ashdod	30	20	10	2796	2539	+257	50	Advance to the playoffs
6	A.S. Ironi Ashkelon	30	17	13	2480	2514	−34	47	Advance to the playoffs
7	Elitzur Shomron	30	15	15	2467	2565	−98	45	Advance to the playoffs
8	A.S. Ramat HaSharon	30	14	16	2608	2596	+12	44	Advance to the playoffs
9	Otef Darom BC	30	13	17	2502	2524	−22	43	Advance to the playoffs
10	Hapoel Migdal HaEmek/Jezreel	30	12	18	2692	2746	−54	42	Advance to playouts
11	Maccabi Mendal Petah Tikva	30	11	19	2395	2501	−106	41	Advance to playouts
12	A.S. Kiryat Gat/Ashkelon	30	10	20	2465	2648	−183	40	Advance to playouts
13	Elitzur Yavne	30	9	21	2557	2709	−152	39	Advance to playouts
14	Maccabi Haifa	30	9	21	2500	2628	−128	39	Advance to playouts
15	Maccabi Ma'ale Adumim	30	8	22	2356	2680	−324	38	Advance to playouts
16	S.C. Zafed	30	4	26	2487	2835	−348	34	Advance to playouts

=== Rounds 1 to 30 ===
Home \ Away	AKG	ASH	ARH	ESH	EYV	HHA	HMJ	IEI	INA	MAS	MHA	MMA	MPT	MRH	DAR	SCZ
A.S. Kiryat Gat/Ashkelon		85–82	103–89	80–82	89–93	88–61	71–90	81–99	89–102	79–109	96–85	85–74	86–80	85–101	90–103	88–74
A.S. Ironi Ashkelon	86–82		87–77	77–68	78–85	94–82	108–98	70–84	68–90	91–83	91–90	91–76	82–79	75–82	63–95	88–82
A.S. Ramat HaSharon	98–85	103–108		82–91	82–81	87–95	107–93	89–96	79–92	73–91	85–81	109–87	89–81	92–102	87–84	89–69
Elitzur Shomron	88–79	85–80	88–81		94–100	73–90	84–77	79–95	72–78	95–108	93–88	71–72	80–78	90–78	84–96	97–86
Elitzur Yavne	100–72	68–80	69–92	85–79		99–101	89–97	78–80	77–85	72–100	87–76	82–76	76–77	86–89	82–96	87–83
Hapoel Haifa	100–83	91–77	93–77	79–74	104–103		88–80	92–96	82–77	79–97	84–72	93–83	71–79	89–78	66–60	97–84
Hapoel Migdal HaEmek/Jezreel	79–87	88–80	89–76	96–99	120–112	99–104		90–100	94–102	90–91	87–79	76–83	101–94	90–88	85–92	90–80
Ironi Eilat	80–52	90–73	83–72	83–71	94–68	87–91	87–81		84–78	102–83	96–83	107–71	104–89	86–79	95–83	123–68
Ironi Nahariya	94–71	85–65	78–86	89–49	98–84	77–65	101–88	79–87		88–84	95–89	98–78	87–77	61–70	95–70	94–90
Maccabi Ashdod	93–75	92–88	87–93	112–79	87–77	96–76	99–76	97–108	81–91		85–82	103–80	94–75	83–90	99–82	125–101
Maccabi Haifa	89–90	73–75	92–86	82–85	105–102	75–91	89–85	91–104	84–79	77–89		77–87	70–85	77–92	88–82	65–80
Maccabi Ma'ale Adumim	81–66	90–97	64–92	75–85	81–66	76–88	79–83	62–103	84–108	94–92	92–95		68–89	61–80	83–85	93–74
Maccabi Mendal Petah Tikva	76–87	57–73	89–95	89–81	93–91	72–70	77–82	66–102	65–77	78–93	70–79	96–60		60–97	86–72	95–67
Maccabi Rehovot	76–73	85–68	88–85	86–77	103–71	84–90	95–81	67–93	88–72	92–77	95–74	102–67	80–74		91–81	101–70
Otef Darom BC	94–87	80–91	87–74	66–73	80–83	76–84	82–102	74–82	76–83	83–80	75–101	102–74	111–72	68–88		66–64
S.C. Zafed	90–81	89–94	63–82	98–101	119–104	89–105	123–105	85–96	74–89	73–86	85–92	85–105	76–97	74–99	92–101	

Updated to match(es) played on complete}. Source:
Legend: Blue = home team win; Red = away team win.
Matches with lighter background shading were decided after overtime.

== Playouts ==
Pos	Team	Pld	W	L	PF	PA	PD	Pts	Qualification or relegation	HMJ	AKG	MPT	EYV	MHA	MMA	SCZ
10	Hapoel Migdal HaEmek/Jezreel	36	16	20	3274	3298	−24	52				110–100	92–83		96–73	
11	A.S. Kiryat Gat/Ashkelon	36	14	22	2993	3145	−152	50		89–78			70–80		100–63	
12	Maccabi Mendal Petah Tikva	36	14	22	2947	3026	−79	50			105–80			68–80		108–101
13	Elitzur Yavne	36	13	23	3049	3199	−150	49				72–92		92–86		93–86
14	Maccabi Haifa	36	12	24	3024	3123	−99	48	Relegation to Liga Artzit	86–75	81–91				77–81	
15	Maccabi Ma'ale Adumim	36	11	25	2812	3190	−378	47	Relegation to Liga Artzit			82–79	64–72			93–86
16	S.C. Zafed	36	4	32	3059	3472	−413	40	Relegation to Liga Artzit	121–131	90–98			88–114		

== Playoffs ==
Quarterfinals; 3–12 May
2	Maccabi Rehovot	91	73	58	1
9	Otef Darom BC	90	89	77	2
5	Maccabi Ashdod	91	76	–	2
6	A.S. Ironi Ashkelon	73	74	–	0
3	Ironi Nahariya	90	107	–	2
8	A.S. Ramat HaSharon	60	87	–	0
4	Hapoel Haifa	75	76	–	0
7	Elitzur Shomron	87	88	–	2

Semifinals; 14–27 May
5	Maccabi Ashdod	103	67	110	82	–	3
9	Otef Darom BC	79	71	84	79	–	1
3	Ironi Nahariya	90	82	97	–	–	3
7	Elitzur Shomron	65	77	77	–	–	0

Finals; 31 May–16 June
3	Ironi Nahariya	114	70	82	83	–	1
5	Maccabi Ashdod	108	85	86	94	–	3

=== Quarterfinals ===
==== Game 1 ====
5 May	Maccabi Rehovot	91–90(OT) (Series: 1–0)	Otef Darom BC	Rehovot
18:30	Scoring by quarter: 18–16, 14–18, 23–17, 22–26, Overtime: 14–13
	Pts: Aldrich 22; Rebs: Sharon 14; Asts: Menachem 8 PIR: Aldrich 24	Boxscore	Pts: Cohen 18; Rebs: Warren 18; Asts: Shafrir, Shaul 5 PIR: Warren 28	Arena: Barzilai Sports Center

5 May	Maccabi Ashdod	91–73 (Series: 1–0)	A.S. Ironi Ashkelon	Ashdod
18:00	Scoring by quarter: 21–25, 24–14, 27–17, 19–17
	Pts: Hall 22; Rebs: Hall 9 Asts: Turner 6 PIR: Hall 34	Boxscore	Pts: Poleg 14; Rebs: Wilson 7 Asts: Polag 8 PIR: Polag 20	Arena: HaKiriya Arena

3 May	Ironi Nahariya	90–60 (Series: 1–0)	A.S. Ramat HaSharon	Nahariya
18:00	Scoring by quarter: 30–15, 26–10, 15–17, 19–18
	Pts: Earlington 19; Rebs: Earlington, Clark 9 Asts: Clark 7 PIR: Clark 24	Boxscore	Pts: Musis 21; Rebs: Musis 13; Asts: Three Players 2 PIR: Musis 26	Arena: Ein Sara Sport Hall

4 May	Hapoel Haifa	75–87 (Series: 0–1)	Elitzur Shomron	Haifa
20:00	Scoring by quarter: 17–24, 27–22, 18–24, 13–17
	Pts: Johnson 19; Rebs: Johnson 13; Asts: Yam 6 PIR: Johnson 27	Boxscore	Pts: Treadwell 23; Rebs: Treadwell 16; Asts: Hachamo 5 PIR: Treadwell 35	Arena: Romema Arena

==== Game 2 ====
8 May	Otef Darom BC	89–73 (Series: 1–1)	Maccabi Rehovot	Magen
13:40	Scoring by quarter: 25–15, 21–23, 18–13, 25–22
	Pts: Cele, Cohen 20; Rebs: Dekel 6 Asts: Cohen, Sommerfeld 7 PIR: Cohen 32	Boxscore	Pts: Sharon 16; Rebs: Sharon 10; Asts: Aharoni 11; PIR: Sharon 22	Arena: Rotem Hall

9 May	A.S. Ironi Ashkelon	74–76 (Series: 0–2)	Maccabi Ashdod	Ashkelon
21:15	Scoring by quarter: 30–11, 15–23, 10–21, 19–21
	Pts: Shabat 15; Rebs: Wilson 11; Asts: Six Players 3 PIR: Shabat 15	Boxscore	Pts: Turner 28; Rebs: Hall 11; Asts: Hall 6 PIR: Turner, Hall 21	Arena: Ashkelon Sports Arena

6 May	A.S. Ramat HaSharon	87–107 (Series: 0–2)	Ironi Nahariya	Ramat HaSharon
19:00	Scoring by quarter: 23–25, 20–23, 20–37, 24–22
	Pts: Roberts, Kalfon 16; Rebs: Three Players 5 Asts: Belga 5 PIR: Roberts, Moses 18	Boxscore	Pts: Ben David 20; Rebs: Clark 10; Asts: Ohayon 6 PIR: Clark 32	Arena: Kiryat Yearim Hall

7 May	Elitzur Shomron	88–76 (Series: 2–0)	Hapoel Haifa	Kafr Qasim
19:00	Scoring by quarter: 19–21, 18–17, 27–20, 24–18
	Pts: Cole 25; Rebs: Treadwell 13; Asts: Hachamo 6 PIR: Cole 28	Boxscore	Pts: Johnson 21; Rebs: Ogbeide 10; Asts: Yam 8 PIR: Ogbeide 21	Arena: Kafr Qasim Sport Hall

==== Game 3 ====
12 May	Maccabi Rehovot	58–77 (Series: 1–2)	Otef Darom BC	Rehovot
19:00	Scoring by quarter: 18–15, 13–14, 9–23, 18–25
	Pts: Sharon, Coblin 14; Rebs: Sharon 11; Asts: Menachem 7 PIR: Sharon 16	Boxscore	Pts: Shelef 18; Rebs: Warren 7 Asts: Sommerfeld 3 PIR: Shelef 16	Arena: Barzilai Sports Center

=== Semifinals ===
==== Game 1 ====
15 May	Maccabi Ashdod	103–79 (Series: 1–0)	Otef Darom BC	Ashdod
13:50	Scoring by quarter: 25–18, 23–15, 32–21, 23–25
	Pts: Sheinbaum 25; Rebs: Hall 13; Asts: Reuven 7 PIR: Hall 40	Boxscore	Pts: Cele 20; Rebs: Sternberg 6 Asts: Shaul, Sommerfeld 4 PIR: Cele, Sternberg 14	Arena: HaKiriya Arena

14 May	Ironi Nahariya	90–65 (Series: 1–0)	Elitzur Shomron	Nahariya
20:20	Scoring by quarter: 19–11, 23–19, 26–13, 22–22
	Pts: Earlington 17; Rebs: Clark 10; Asts: Clark 8 PIR: Clark 32	Boxscore	Pts: Hachamo 22; Rebs: Treadwell 16; Asts: Delaney 3 PIR: Cole 16	Arena: Ein Sara Sport Hall

==== Game 2 ====
19 May	Otef Darom BC	71–67 (Series: 1–1)	Maccabi Ashdod	Magen
21:05	Scoring by quarter: 16–19, 13–17, 20–19, 22–12
	Pts: Cele 19; Rebs: Cele 7 Asts: Sommerfeld 4 PIR: Cele 24	Boxscore	Pts: Gold 17; Rebs: Hall 10; Asts: Three Players 4 PIR: Hall 24	Arena: Rotem Hall

18 May	Elitzur Shomron	77–82 (Series: 0–2)	Ironi Nahariya	Kafr Qasim
19:00	Scoring by quarter: 14–21, 13–21, 25–18, 25–22
	Pts: Treadwell 16; Rebs: Treadwell 22; Asts: Hachamo 7 PIR: Treadwell 40	Boxscore	Pts: Abaev 21; Rebs: Ohayon, Abaev 9 Asts: Ben David 8 PIR: Abaev 28	Arena: Kafr Qasim Sport Hall

==== Game 3 ====
24 May	Maccabi Ashdod	110–84 (Series: 2–1)	Otef Darom BC	Ashdod
19:00	Scoring by quarter: 28–22, 25–16, 28–24, 29–22
	Pts: Turner 27; Rebs: Pitshon 9 Asts: Reuven 9 PIR: Turner 33	Boxscore	Pts: Warren 20; Rebs: Warren 8 Asts: Sommerfeld 7 PIR: Warren 24	Arena: HaKiriya Arena

21 May	Ironi Nahariya	97–77 (Series: 3–0)	Elitzur Shomron	Nahariya
12:45	Scoring by quarter: 26–14, 23–23, 20–25, 28–15
	Pts: Earlington 32; Rebs: Earlington 10; Asts: Ben David, Abaev 6 PIR: Earlington 38	Boxscore	Pts: Cole 13; Rebs: Treadwell 8 Asts: Abouloff 6 PIR: Cole, Mintz 13	Arena: Ein Sara Sport Hall

==== Game 4 ====
27 May	Otef Darom BC	79–82 (Series: 1–3)	Maccabi Ashdod	Magen
20:10	Scoring by quarter: 29–18, 17–25, 16–17, 17–22
	Pts: Dekel 21; Rebs: Shaul 6 Asts: Shaul 7 PIR: Shaul 18	Boxscore	Pts: Turner 28; Rebs: Hall 12; Asts: Turner, Reuven 3 PIR: Hall 33	Arena: Rotem Hall

=== Finals ===
31 May Game 1	Ironi Nahariya	114–108(OT) (Series: 1–0)	Maccabi Ashdod	Nahariya
20:00	Scoring by quarter: 22–29, 25–10, 22–25, 23–28, Overtime: 22–16
	Pts: Earlington 28; Rebs: Clark 13; Asts: Ohayon 7 PIR: Earlington 33	Boxscore	Pts: Turner 34; Rebs: Turner, Gold 12; Asts: Pitshon 6 PIR: Turner 38	Arena: Ein Sara Sport Hall

4 June Game 2	Maccabi Ashdod	85–70 (Series: 1–1)	Ironi Nahariya	Ashdod
20:00	Scoring by quarter: 24–22, 28–21, 16–16, 17–11
	Pts: Turner 33; Rebs: Hall 8 Asts: Reuven 9 PIR: Turner 30	Boxscore	Pts: Earlington 22; Rebs: Earlington 14; Asts: Clark 5 PIR: Earlington 26	Arena: HaKiriya Arena

8 June Game 3	Ironi Nahariya	82–86 (Series: 1–2)	Maccabi Ashdod	Nahariya
18:25	Scoring by quarter: 14–11, 16–26, 26–17, 26–32
	Pts: Abaev 15; Rebs: Clark 10; Asts: Ohayon 10; PIR: Clark 15	Boxscore	Pts: Turner 21; Rebs: Hall 11; Asts: Reuven, Hall 5 PIR: Hall 34	Arena: Ein Sara Sport Hall

11 June Game 4	Maccabi Ashdod	94–83 (Series: 3–1)	Ironi Nahariya	Ashdod
18:20	Scoring by quarter: 20–16, 20–23, 31–16, 23–28
	Pts: Turner 30; Rebs: Hall 13; Asts: Hall 4 PIR: Turner, Hall 32	Boxscore	Pts: Davidi 17; Rebs: Clark 9 Asts: Ben David 10; PIR: Ben David 18	Arena: HaKiriya Arena
