= 2026–27 Israeli Basketball Premier League =

Israeli Basketball Premier League
- Season: 2026–27
- Dates: 10 October 2026 – June 2027
- Teams: 14
- TV partner: Sports Channel

The 2026–27 Israeli Basketball Premier League, for sponsorship reasons Ligat Winner, will be the 73rd season of the Israeli Basketball Premier League. The season is set to start on 10 October 2026.

Defending champion and most decorated club Maccabi Tel Aviv have won the Social Supercup against finalists and rivals Hapoel Tel Aviv (101-83) to start the Israeli season before the Ligat Winner tip-off.

== Format ==
For the third straight season, the format of regular season remains unchanged and consists of a round-robin format, with 26 games played by each team (13 home, 13 away). Top 6 will directly qualify to the playoffs (with the top 4 earning homecourt advantage) while the 7th to 10th-ranked teams will participate in the play-in showdown and the 11th to 14th-ranked teams go through play-out to maintain their position in the league.

The play-in showdown is based on the Page–McIntyre system, exactly as the NBA play-in tournament. Each of the three games is hosted by the team with the higher rank in the standings and determines the 7th and 8th seeds to complete the playoffs bracket.

The play-out is a 3 round-robin format (6 games total) played by the bottom 4 teams of the regular season. As the previous editions, the last 2 teams are relegated to Liga Leumit, the second israeli basketball league.

The playoffs have seen a slight evolution of their structure following the events of the previous season. The first round (quarterfinals) is now being played as a best-of-three (1-1-1) series upon decision of the competition committee. The semifinals and finals are scheduled as best-of-five (1-1-1-1-1) series.

== Teams ==
Teams of the 2026–27 Israeli Basketball Premier League

Elitzur Netanya and Ironi Ra'anana have been relegated to 2026–27 National League after placing in the bottom places of the 2025–26 Premier League. Hapoel Ironi Eilat and Maccabi Ashdod have been promoted to the league after respectively winning the 2025–26 National League and winning access playoffs.

=== Arenas and locations ===
Team	Home city	Stadium	Capacity
Bnei Herzliya	Herzliya	HaYovel Herzliya	1,500
Hapoel Be'er Sheva/Dimona	Be'er Sheva and Dimona	Conch Arena	3,000
Hapoel Galil Elyon	Upper Galilee	HaPais Kfar Blum	2,000
Hapoel HaEmek	Gilboa Regional, Lower Galilee and Afula	Haim Ohayon Sports Hall	2,057
Hapoel Holon	Holon	Holon Toto Hall	5,500
Hapoel Ironi Eilat	Eilat	Begin Arena	1,600
Hapoel Jerusalem	Jerusalem	Pais Arena	11,000
Hapoel Tel Aviv	Tel Aviv	Shlomo Group Arena	3,504
Ironi Kiryat Ata	Kiryat Ata	Ramaz Hall	1,200
Ironi Ness Ziona	Ness Ziona	Lev Hamoshava	1,300
Maccabi Ashdod	Ashdod	HaKiriya Arena	2,200
Maccabi Ironi Ramat Gan	Ramat Gan	Zisman Hall	1,500
Maccabi Rishon LeZion	Rishon LeZion	Beit Maccabi Rishon	2,500
Maccabi Tel Aviv	Tel Aviv	Menora Mivtachim Arena	10,383

=== Personnel and sponsorship ===
Team	Chairman	Head coach	Team captain	Kit manufacturer	Main sponsor
Bnei Herzliya	(Israel) Eldad Akunis	(Israel) Yehu Orland	(United States) Daeshon Francis	Peak	PenLink
Hapoel Be'er Sheva/Dimona	(Israel) Kfir Arazi	(United States) Doug Spradley	(Israel) (Uruguay) Golan Gutt	Kelme	Altshuler Shacham
Hapoel Galil Elyon	(Israel) Zohar Levkovitz	(Israel) Idan Avshalom	(Israel) Yahel Melamed	Peak	Alef Bandek
Hapoel HaEmek	(Israel) Gideon Yadin	(Israel) Guy Goodes	(Israel) Roey Netzia	ON	Gilat Telecom
Hapoel Holon	(Israel) Eitan Lanciano	(Israel) Shmulik Brener	(Israel) Netanel Artzi	Self Made	Maoz Daniel
Hapoel Ironi Eilat	(Israel) Ranny Cohen	(Israel) Oren Aharoni	(Israel) Tzuf Ben Moshe	Reebok	
Hapoel Jerusalem	(Israel) (United States) Matan Edelson	(Serbia) Saša Obradović	(Israel) Yovel Zoosman	Reebok	Midtown Jerusalem
Hapoel Tel Aviv	(Israel) Offer Yanai	(Greece) Dimitrios Itoudis	(Israel) Bar Timor	Adidas	IBI Investment
Ironi Kiryat Ata	(Israel) Naftali Bentov	(Israel) Eldad Bentov	(Israel) Tomer Asayag	GEFF	Lati Construction
Ironi Ness Ziona	(Israel) Yaniv Mizrahi	(United States) Paul Corsaro	(United States) (Israel) Spencer Weisz	Under Armour	Chai Motors
Maccabi Ashdod	(Israel) Ronan Harel	(Israel) Dan Katzir	(United States) Robert Turner	Reebok	Rotshtein
Maccabi Ironi Ramat Gan	(Israel) Chen Shnaiderman	(Israel) Elad Hasin	(Israel) Gil Beni	Peak	Cnanan Groups
Maccabi Rishon LeZion	(Israel) Erez Ben Haim	(Israel) Guy Kaplan	(United States) (Israel) Joshua Freund	Peak	Tapuzina
Maccabi Tel Aviv	(Israel) Shimon Mizrahi	(Israel) Oded Kattash	(United States) (Israel) John DiBartolomeo	Adidas	Rapyd

=== Managerial changes ===
Team	Outgoing manager	Manner of departure	Date of vacancy	Position in table	Replaced with	Date of appointment	Ref.
Hapoel HaEmek	(Israel) Sharon Avrahami	Fired	17 October 2026	8th (0–1)	(Israel) Guy Goodes	9 November 2026	
Hapoel Holon	(Bosnia and Herzegovina) Predrag Krunić	Fired	8 November 2026	11th (1–4)	(Israel) Shmulik Brener	12 November 2026	

== Regular season ==
Pos	Team	Pld	W	L	PF	PA	PD	Pts	Qualification or relegation
1	Hapoel Jerusalem	6	6	0	485	417	+68	12	Advance to the playoffs
2	Ironi Ness Ziona	6	4	2	519	474	+45	10	Advance to the playoffs
3	Maccabi Rishon LeZion	6	4	2	506	478	+28	10	Advance to the playoffs
4	Hapoel Galil Elyon	6	4	2	548	558	−10	10	Advance to the playoffs
5	Hapoel Tel Aviv	5	4	1	419	377	+42	9	Advance to the playoffs
6	Hapoel Ironi Eilat	6	3	3	514	509	+5	9	Advance to the playoffs
7	Maccabi Ashdod	6	3	3	461	458	+3	9	Advance to the play-in
8	Maccabi Ironi Ramat Gan	6	3	3	501	535	−34	9	Advance to the play-in
9	Hapoel Holon	6	2	4	487	502	−15	8	Advance to the play-in
10	Bnei Herzliya	6	2	4	508	528	−20	8	Advance to the play-in
11	Ironi Kiryat Ata	6	2	4	515	578	−63	8	Advance to playouts
12	Maccabi Tel Aviv	5	2	3	490	462	+28	7	Advance to playouts
13	Hapoel HaEmek	6	1	5	436	462	−26	7	Advance to playouts
14	Hapoel Be'er Sheva/Dimona	6	1	5	497	548	−51	7	Advance to playouts

Updated to match(es) played on November 16, 2026. Source:
Rules for classification:

=== Rounds 1 to 26 ===
Home \ Away	BNH	HBS	HGE	HAM	HHO	HIE	HJE	HTA	IKA	INZ	MAS	MRG	MRL	MTA
Bnei Herzliya		Mar 19–22	Feb 11–21	Apr 9–12	Dec 25–28	96–93	Dec 4–8	Jan 22–25	Apr 23–26	Mar 12–15	72–75	79–89	Dec 11–14	Mar 26–29
Hapoel Be'er Sheva/Dimona	Dec 18–21		Apr 9–12	Jan 8–11	75–91	Apr 23–26	Mar 26–29	82–95	Mar 12–15	Nov 20	Feb 11–21	Apr 29–May 2	Jan 22–25	Jan 2
Hapoel Galil Elyon	Jan 1–4	Dec 11–14		Dec 4–8	Feb 5–8	90–88	Apr 16–19	Mar 19–22	Apr 2–5	74–82	Apr 29–May 2	104–101	Mar 5–9	Jan 15–18
Hapoel HaEmek	Nov 22	Apr 16–19	Apr 23–26		Mar 12–15	Apr 2–5	Feb 11–21	Dec 11–14	Jan 22–25	66–78	Jan 1–4	77–86	Jan 15–18	Dec 18–21
Hapoel Holon	Apr 16–19	Jan 15–18	101–110	87–69		Feb 11–21	69–92	Jan 8–11	Mar 26–29	Apr 2–5	Dec 18–21	Jan 22–25	70–78	Mar 5–9
Hapoel Ironi Eilat	Mar 5–9	88–86	Mar 12–15	Dec 25–28	78–69		Jan 22–25	Dec 7	Jan 8–11	Apr 29–May 2	Mar 26–29	Nov 22	Apr 9–12	Jan 1–4
Hapoel Jerusalem	Apr 2–5	88–74	Jan 8–11	65–59	Apr 29–May 2	88–78		Mar 5–9	Dec 25–28	Feb 5–8	Nov 20	Dec 18–21	Apr 23–26	Apr 9–12
Hapoel Tel Aviv	78–71	Apr 2–5	Dec 25–28	Feb 5–8	Apr 9–12	Jan 15–18	60–70		Nov 21	Feb 11–21	81–67	Jan 1–4	Mar 26–29	Mar 12–15
Ironi Kiryat Ata	97–87	Jan 1–4	Dec 18–21	86–85	Dec 11–14	Apr 16–19	Mar 19–22	Apr 29–May 2		Jan 15–18	74–89	Apr 9–12	Dec 4–8	Feb 11–21
Ironi Ness Ziona	96–103	Mar 5–9	Jan 22–25	Mar 26–29	Jan 1–4	Dec 18–21	Dec 11–14	Dec 4–8	111–81		Apr 9–12	Mar 19–22	Jan 8–11	Apr 23–26
Maccabi Ashdod	Feb 5–8	88–92	66–77	Mar 19–22	Apr 23–26	Dec 11–14	Jan 15–18	Apr 16–19	Mar 5–9	76–62		Jan 8–11	Dec 25–28	Dec 4–8
Maccabi Ironi Ramat Gan	Jan 15–18	Dec 25–28	Mar 26–29	Mar 5–9	Dec 4–8	Feb 5–8	Mar 12–15	Apr 23–26	90–88	74–90	Apr 2–5		61–97	Dec 11–14
Maccabi Rishon LeZion	Apr 29–May 2	98–88	Nov 22	60–80	Mar 19–22	80–89	Jan 1–4	Dec 18–21	Feb 5–8	Apr 16–19	Mar 12–15	Feb 11–21		93–90
Maccabi Tel Aviv	Jan 8–11	Feb 5–8	120–93	Apr 29–May 2	Nov 21	Mar 19–22	77–82	87–105	116–89	Dec 25–28	Jan 22–25	Apr 16–19	Apr 2–5	

Updated to match(es) played on November 16, 2026. Source:
Legend: Blue = home team win; Red = away team win.
Matches with lighter background shading were decided after overtime.

== Awards ==
=== MVP of the Round ===
Round	Player	Team	EFF	Ref.
October
1	(Israel) Tomer Asayag	Ironi Kiryat Ata	21	
2	(United States) Malik Hall	Hapoel HaEmek	41	
3	(United States) Zack Bryant	Bnei Herzliya	47	
4	(Serbia) Vasilije Micić	Hapoel Tel Aviv	33	
–
5				
8				

=== Monthly Awards ===
==== Player of the Month ====
Month	Player	Team	EFF	Ref.
October	(United States) Ahmad Caver	Maccabi Ironi Ramat Gan	18.5	
November				
December				
January				
February–March				
April				
May				

==== Israeli Player of the Month ====
Month	Player	Team	EFF	Ref.
October	(Israel) Itay Moskovits	Hapoel Galil Elyon	17.0	
November				
December				
January				
February–March				
April				
May				

==== Coach of the Month ====
Month	Coach	Team	W-L	Ref.
October	(Serbia) Saša Obradović	Jerusalem	3–0	
November				
December				
January				
February–March				
April				
May				

== Israeli clubs in European competitions ==
European-wide competitions
Competition	Team	Progress
EuroLeague	Maccabi Tel Aviv	Regular season
EuroLeague	Hapoel Tel Aviv	Regular season
EuroCup	Hapoel Jerusalem	Regular season
Champions League	Hapoel Holon	Regular season
Champions League	Bnei Herzliya	Regular season
