= 2021–22 Israeli Basketball National League =

Israeli Basketball National League
- Season: 2021–22
- Dates: 12 October 2021 – May 2022
- Teams: 15

Regular season
- Relegated: Maccabi Ashdod; Hapoel Migdal HaEmek/Jezreel; Maccabi Hod HaSharon

Finals
- Champions: Elitzur Kiryat Ata
- Runners-up: Maccabi Ironi Ramat Gan
- Semifinalists: Ironi Nahariya; Hapoel Hevel Modi'in

The 2021-2022 Israeli Basketball National League was the 22nd season as second tier since its re-alignment in 2000 and the 68th season of second-tier basketball in Israel.

== Teams ==
The following teams have changed division since the 2020–2021 season.

=== To Liga Leumit ===
Promoted from Liga Artzit

- Maccabi Ma'ale Adumim (South Division)
- Hapoel Migdal HaEmek/Jezreel (North Division)

Relegated from Premier League

- Ironi Nahariya
- Maccabi Haifa

=== From Liga Leumit ===
Promoted to Premier League

- ~~Elitzur Netanya~~
- Hapoel Galil Elyon

Relegated to Liga Artzit

- Maccabi Kiryat Motzkin
- Elitzur Yavne
- Hapoel Acre/Mateh Asher

=== Venues and locations ===
League Map

Team	City	Arena	Capacity
A.S. Ramat HaSharon	Ramat HaSharon	Oranim Hall	900
Elitzur Eito Ashkelon	Ashkelon	Ashkelon Sports Arena	3,000
Elitzur Kiryat Ata	Kiryat Ata	Ramaz Hall	1,200
Elitzur Netanya	Netanya	Yeshurun Hall	1,000
Hapoel Afula	Afula	Nir Ha'emak Hall	1,000
Hapoel Hevel Modi'in	Hevel Modi'in Regional Council	Nahshon Hall	370
Hapoel Migdal HaEmek/Jezreel	Migdal HaEmek and Jezreel Valley Regional Council	Yearot HaEmek	900
Hapoel Ramat Gan Givatayim	Ramat Gan and Givatayim	Zisman Hall	1,400
Ironi Nahariya	Nahariya	Ein Sara Sport Hall	2,500
Ironi Ra'anana	Ra'anana	Metro West	1,850
Maccabi Ashdod	Ashdod	HaKiriya Arena	2,200
Maccabi Haifa	Haifa	Romema Arena	5,000
Maccabi Hod HaSharon	Hod HaSharon	Atidim Hall	400
Maccabi Ironi Ramat Gan	Ramat Gan	Zisman Hall	1,400
Maccabi Ma'ale Adumim	Ma'ale Adumim	Cosell Center, Jerusalem	400

== Regular season ==
=== League table ===
Pos	Team	Pld	W	L	PF	PA	PD	Pts	Qualification or relegation
1	Ironi Nahariya	28	24	4	2287	2020	+267	52	Advance to playoffs
2	Hapoel Hevel Modi'in	28	21	7	2576	2433	+143	49	Advance to playoffs
3	Maccabi Ironi Ramat Gan	28	20	8	2474	2280	+194	48	Advance to playoffs
4	Elitzur Kiryat Ata	28	19	9	2401	2302	+99	47	Advance to playoffs
5	A.S. Ramat HaSharon	28	19	9	2281	2226	+55	47	Advance to playoffs
6	Hapoel Afula	28	17	11	2392	2230	+162	45	Advance to playoffs
7	Elitzur Netanya	28	15	13	2451	2408	+43	43	Advance to playoffs
8	Maccabi Haifa	28	14	14	2308	2326	−18	42	Advance to playoffs
9	Ironi Ra'anana	28	12	16	2428	2420	+8	40	Advance to playouts
10	Elitzur Eito Ashkelon	28	12	16	2332	2384	−52	40	Advance to playouts
11	Maccabi Ma'ale Adumim	28	11	17	2354	2383	−29	39	Advance to playouts
12	Hapoel Migdal HaEmek/Jezreel	28	9	19	2279	2430	−151	37	Advance to playouts
13	Hapoel Ramat Gan Givatayim	28	8	20	2174	2270	−96	36	Advance to playouts
14	Maccabi Ashdod	28	7	21	2278	2445	−167	35	Advance to playouts
15	Maccabi Hod HaSharon	28	2	26	2023	2481	−458	30	Advance to playouts

=== Rounds 1 to 30 ===
Home \ Away	ARH	EAS	EKA	ENE	HAF	HHM	HMJ	HRG	IRN	IRA	MAS	MHA	MHH	IRG	MMA
A.S. Ramat HaSharon		79–76	79–77	94–76	88–71	107–88	90–86	68–66	49–65	87–74	100–73	75–66	85–65	84–96	70–93
Elitzur Eito Ashkelon	87–92		84–94	89–94	77–76	92–100	87–73	88–86	80–78	109–103	73–58	79–83	80–64	94–97	99–105
Elitzur Kiryat Ata	81–72	74–68		89–84	88–85	88–81	93–80	79–72	55–75	101–83	72–69	82–79	87–71	79–84	100–83
Elitzur Netanya	76–87	99–96	105–87		70–79	102–106	103–99	75–94	75–83	88–75	96–91	97–83	79–56	92–99	91–87
Hapoel Afula	76–65	90–78	97–98	103–89		79–88	104–63	92–50	82–90	85–68	86–77	79–67	84–56	107–95	94–82
Hapoel Hevel Modi'in	95–83	83–96	89–86	100–84	91–76		98–84	96–84	83–85	94–88	88–79	91–84	92–67	91–85	95–98
Hapoel Migdal HaEmek/Jezreel	63–65	85–101	95–90	89–77	75–86	82–87		88–77	74–86	87–76	80–75	82–84	97–66	81–87	62–90
Hapoel Ramat Gan Givatayim	74–79	71–78	82–84	79–88	81–62	77–91	91–80		67–68	88–80	79–96	85–81	87–66	75–82	85–80
Ironi Nahariya	71–68	87–63	89–83	70–65	74–70	74–79	102–73	78–70		93–83	95–80	88–73	82–59	75–81	87–57
Ironi Ra'anana	96–69	100–77	92–82	81–91	91–69	82–95	87–74	87–70	81–83		95–84	75–84	104–80	107–102	101–78
Maccabi Ashdod	85–112	68–79	116–111	88–89	84–90	96–95	87–93	77–68	72–78	98–91		73–77	80–67	92–98	69–83
Maccabi Haifa	86–89	88–80	67–88	79–97	87–88	89–100	88–75	76–74	63–81	116–74	88–84		88–77	78–87	86–80
Maccabi Hod HaSharon	81–83	59–75	79–100	63–84	102–91	85–103	81–94	72–84	74–93	82–103	81–91	83–94		74–96	71–74
Maccabi Ironi Ramat Gan	79–90	97–74	76–81	76–75	71–94	96–103	88–69	95–85	74–60	85–62	98–67	77–83	90–56		87–77
Maccabi Ma'ale Adumim	104–72	101–73	69–72	79–104	85–98	105–74	84–89	78–66	88–97	69–89	83–69	86–91	81–89	75–96	

Legend: Blue = home team win; Red = away team win.
Matches with lighter background shading were decided after overtime.

== Playouts ==
Pos	Team	Pld	W	L	PF	PA	PD	Pts	Qualification or relegation	IRA	EAS	HRG	MMA	MAS	HMJ	MHH
9	Ironi Ra'anana	34	17	17	2983	2898	+85	51			99–80			85–86	106–88	
10	Elitzur Eito Ashkelon	34	14	20	2809	2908	−99	48				78–85	81–88			72–67
11	Hapoel Ramat Gan Givatayim	34	13	21	2706	2739	−33	47		77–90			94–76	107–77		
12	Maccabi Ma'ale Adumim	34	13	21	2861	2922	−61	47		75–78				85–94	90–114	
13	Maccabi Ashdod	34	12	22	2807	2949	−142	46	Relegation to Liga Artzit		98–78				88–82	86–67
14	Hapoel Migdal HaEmek/Jezreel	34	11	23	2802	2953	−151	45	Relegation to Liga Artzit		87–88	70–84				82–67
15	Maccabi Hod HaSharon	34	2	32	2452	2996	−544	36	Relegation to Liga Artzit	72–97		78–85	78–93			

== Playoffs ==
Quarterfinals
1	Ironi Nahariya	89	79	81	80	—	3
8	Maccabi Haifa	65	87	66	71	—	1
4	Elitzur Kiryat Ata	73	85	92	112	—	3
5	A.S. Ramat HaSharon	78	77	90	62	—	1
3	Maccabi Ironi Ramat Gan	75	87	79	—	—	3
6	Hapoel Afula	72	78	70	—	—	0
2	Hapoel Hevel Modi'in	95	84	100	98	—	3
7	Elitzur Netanya	83	88	92	89	—	1

Semifinals
1	Ironi Nahariya	79	59	66	66	—	1
4	Elitzur Kiryat Ata	82	80	64	75	—	3
2	Hapoel Hevel Modi'in	91	79	91	68	—	1
3	Maccabi Ironi Ramat Gan	93	78	93	88	—	3

Finals
3	Maccabi Ironi Ramat Gan	98	72	61	—	—	0
4	Elitzur Kiryat Ata	107	93	65	—	—	3

=== Quarterfinals ===
Team 1	Series	Team 2	Game 1	Game 2	Game 3	Game 4	Game 5
Ironi Nahariya	3–1	Maccabi Haifa	89–65	79–87	81–66	80–71	—
Ironi Kiryat Ata	3–1	A.S. Ramat HaSharon	73–78	85–77	92–90	112–62	—
Maccabi Ironi Ramat Gan	3–0	Hapoel Afula	75–72	87–76	79–70	—	—
Hapoel Hevel Modi'in	3–1	Elitzur Netanya	95–83	84–88	100–92	98–89	—

==== Game 1 ====
April 6	Ironi Nahariya	89–65 (Series: 1–0)	Maccabi Haifa	Nahariya
19:30
				Arena: Ein Sara Sport Hall

April 5	Ironi Kiryat Ata	73–78 (Series: 0–1)	A.S. Ramat HaSharon	Kiryat Ata
19:30
				Arena: Ramaz Hall

April 6	Maccabi roni Ramat Gan	75–72 (Series: 1–0)	Hapoel Afula	Ramat Gan
19:00
				Arena: Zisman Arena

April 5	Hapoel Hevel Modi'in	95–83 (Series: 1–0)	Elitzur Netanya	Shoham
19:00
				Arena: Nachshon Hall

==== Game 2 ====
April 9	Maccabi Haifa	87–79 (Series: 1–1)	Ironi Nahariya	Haifa
21:00
				Arena: Romema Arena

April 8	A.S. Ramat HaSharon	77–85 (Series: 1–1)	Ironi Kiryat Ata	Ramat HaSharon
14:00
				Arena: Oranim Hall

April 9	Hapoel Afula	76–87 (Series: 0–2)	Maccabi Ironi Ramat Gan	Afula
21:00
				Arena: Nir Ha'emak Hall

April 8	Elitzur Netanya	88–85 (Series: 1–1)	Hapoel Hevel Modi'in	Netanya
14:00
				Arena: Yeshurun Hall

==== Game 3 ====
April 12	Ironi Nahariya	81–66 (Series: 2–1)	Maccabi Haifa	Nahariya
19:00
				Arena: Ein Sara Sport Hall

April 11	Ironi Kiryat Ata	92–90 (Series: 2–1)	A.S. Ramat HaSharon	Kiryat Ata
19:00
				Arena: Ramaz Hall

April 12	Maccabi Ironi Ramat Gan	79–70 (Series: 3–0)	Hapoel Afula	Ramat Gan
19:00
				Arena: Zisman Arena

April 11	Hapoel Hevel Modi'in	100–92 (Series: 2–1)	Elitzur Netanya	Shoham
19:00
				Arena: Nachshon Hall

if necessary

==== Game 4 ====
April 17	Maccabi Haifa	71–80 (Series: 1–3)	Ironi Nahariya	Haifa
19:00
				Arena: Romema Arena

April 14	A.S. Ramat HaSharon	62–112 (Series: 1–3)	Ironi Kiryat Ata	Ramat HaSharon
19:00
				Arena: Oranim Hall

April 14	Elitzur Netanya	89–98 (Series: 1–3)	Hapoel Hevel Modi'in	Netanya
19:00
				Arena: Yeshurun Hall

=== Semifinals ===
Team 1	Series	Team 2	Game 1	Game 2	Game 3	Game 4	Game 5
Ironi Nahariya	1–3	Ironi Kiryat Ata	79–82	59–80	66–64	66–75	—
Hapoel Hevel Modi'in	1–3	Maccabi Ironi Ramat Gan	91–93	79–78	91–93	68–88	—

==== Game 1 ====
Ironi Nahariya	79–82 (Series: 0–1)	Ironi Kiryat Ata	Nahariya
			Arena: Ein Sara Sport Hall

Hapoel Hevel Modi'in	91–93 (Series: 0–1)	Maccabi Ironi Ramat Gan	Shoham
			Arena: Nachshon Hall

==== Game 2 ====
Ironi Kiryat Ata	80–59 (Series: 2–0)	Ironi Nahariya	Kiryat Ata
			Arena: Ramaz Hall

Maccabi Ironi Ramat Gan	78–79 (Series: 1–1)	Hapoel Hevel Modi'in	Ramat Gan
			Arena: Zisman Arena

==== Game 3 ====
Ironi Nahariya	66–64 (Series: 1–2)	Ironi Kiryat Ata	Nahariya
			Arena: Ein Sara Sport Hall

Hapoel Hevel Modi'in	91–93 (Series: 1–2)	Maccabi Ironi Ramat Gan	Shoham
			Arena: Nachshon Hall

==== Game 4 ====
Ironi Kiryat Ata	75–66 (Series: 3-1)	Ironi Nahariya	Kiryat Ata
			Arena: Ramaz Hall

Maccabi Ironi Ramat Gan	88–68 (Series: 3-1)	Hapoel Hevel Modi'in	Ramat Gan
			Arena: Zisman Arena

=== Finals ===
Team 1	Series	Team 2	Game 1	Game 2	Game 3	Game 4	Game 5
Maccabi Ironi Ramat Gan	0–3	Ironi Kiryat Ata	98–107	72–93	61–65	—	—

13 May 2022	Maccabi Ironi Ramat Gan	98–107(OT) (Series: 0–1)	Ironi Kiryat Ata	Ramat Gan
13:30	Scoring by quarter: 24–26, 18–18, 21–23, 26–22, Overtime: 9–18
	Pts: Tucker, Amir 20; Rebs: Hirsh 11; Asts: Delaney 9 PIR: Delaney 21	Boxscore	Pts: Stevens 33; Rebs: Stevens 9 Asts: Davidi 11; PIR: Stevens 40	Arena: Zisman Arena

17 May 2022	Ironi Kiryat Ata	vs.	Maccabi Ironi Ramat Gan	Kiryat Ata
19:40
				Arena: Ramaz Hall

20 May 2022	Maccabi Ironi Ramat Gan	vs.	Ironi Kiryat Ata	Ramat Gan
13:30
				Arena: Zisman Arena

if necessary

24 May 2022	Ironi Kiryat Ata	vs.	Maccabi Ironi Ramat Gan	Kiryat Ata
19:30
				Arena: Ramaz Hall

27 May 2022	Maccabi Ironi Ramat Gan	vs.	Ironi Kiryat Ata	Ramat Gan
13:30
				Arena: Zisman Arena
