= 2026–27 Israeli Basketball National League =

Israeli Basketball National League
- Season: 2026–27
- Teams: 15

The 2026–2027 Israeli Basketball National League will be its 28th season as the second tier since its realignment in 2000 and the 73rd season of second-tier basketball in Israel.

== Format ==
The regular season be played in a 30 round (15 round-robin format). The winner will be promoted to the Premier League, while the 2nd to 9th ranked teams will advance to the playoff to determine the second team that will be promoted also. The 10th to 15th ranked teams will advance to the Playout Group, the last three teams will be relegated to the Liga Artzit.

== Teams ==
A total of 15 teams will contest the league, including 10 sides from the 2025–26 season, two relegated from the 2025–26 Premier League and two promoted from the Liga Artzit.

Relegated from Premier League	Promoted to Premier League
Elitzur Netanya; Ironi Ra'anana	Hapoel Ironi Eilat; Maccabi Ashdod
Promoted from Liga Artzit	Relegated to Liga Artzit
Maccabi Kiryat Motzkin (North Division); Hapoel Hevel Modi'in (South Division)	S.C. Zafed; Maccabi Ma'ale Adumim; Maccabi Haifa

=== Venues and locations ===
League Map

Team	City	Arena	Capacity
A.S. Ironi Ashkelon	Ashkelon	Ashkelon Sports Arena	3,000
A.S. Kiryat Gat/Ashkelon	Kiryat Gat and Ashkelon	Kramim Sport Hall, Kiryat Gat	400
A.S. Ramat HaSharon	Ramat HaSharon	Kiryat Yearim Hall	900
Elitzur Netanya	Netanya	Arena Netanya	2,500
Elitzur Shomron	Shomron Regional Council	Kafr Qasim Sport Hall, Kafr Qasim	500
Elitzur Yavne	Yavne	Ralf Klain Hall	930
Hapoel Haifa	Haifa	Romema Arena	5,000
Hapoel Hevel Modi'in	Hevel Modi'in Regional Council	Nachshon Hall	
Hapoel Migdal HaEmek/Jezreel	Migdal HaEmek and Jezreel Valley Regional Council	Yearot HaEmek, Migdal HaEmek	900
Ironi Nahariya	Nahariya	Ein Sara Sport Hall	2,500
Ironi Ra'anana	Ra'anana	Metro West	1,650
Maccabi Kiryat Motzkin	Kiryat Motzkin	Goshen Hall	600
Maccabi Mendal Petah Tikva	Petah Tikva	Rozmarin Sport Hall	500
Maccabi Rehovot	Rehovot	Barzilai Sports Center	700
Otef Darom B.C.	Gaza Envelope	Rotem Hall, Magen	500

== Regular season ==
=== League table ===
Pos	Team	Pld	W	L	PF	PA	PD	Pts	Qualification or relegation
1	Elitzur Netanya	4	4	0	355	285	+70	8	Promoted to the Premier League
2	Ironi Ra'anana	4	3	1	328	311	+17	7	Advance to the playoffs
3	Ironi Nahariya	4	3	1	344	302	+42	7	Advance to the playoffs
4	Elitzur Shomron	4	3	1	324	307	+17	7	Advance to the playoffs
5	Maccabi Rehovot	4	3	1	352	295	+57	7	Advance to the playoffs
6	Hapoel Haifa	4	3	1	339	286	+53	7	Advance to the playoffs
7	Otef Darom BC	4	2	2	324	310	+14	6	Advance to the playoffs
8	A.S. Ironi Ashkelon	4	2	2	357	354	+3	6	Advance to the playoffs
9	A.S. Ramat HaSharon	3	2	1	255	252	+3	5	Advance to the playoffs
10	Maccabi Kiryat Motzkin	4	1	3	350	360	−10	5	Advance to playouts
11	Maccabi Mendal Petah Tikva	3	1	2	265	283	−18	4	Advance to playouts
12	Hapoel Hevel Modi'in	3	1	2	215	235	−20	4	Advance to playouts
13	Elitzur Yavne	4	0	4	250	338	−88	4	Advance to playouts
14	Hapoel Migdal HaEmek/Jezreel	4	0	4	274	378	−104	4	Advance to playouts
15	A.S. Kiryat Gat/Ashkelon	3	0	3	227	263	−36	3	Advance to playouts

Updated to match(es) played on October 6, 2026. Source:

=== Rounds 1 to 30 ===
Home \ Away	ASH	AKG	ARH	ENE	ESH	EYV	HHA	HHM	HMJ	INA	IRA	MKM	MPT	MRH	DAR
A.S. Ironi Ashkelon		88–68								109–104			Nov 20	Nov 10	
A.S. Kiryat Gat/Ashkelon				Nov 17			Nov 10				84–96				
A.S. Ramat HaSharon	Nov 24								Nov 13			90–83			86–78
Elitzur Netanya	88–83						Nov 24	Nov 13	103–67						
Elitzur Shomron			Nov 10	57–76					Nov 24						74–61
Elitzur Yavne			Nov 17	78–88			63–94								Nov 10
Hapoel Haifa	94–77							76–64		Nov 17					
Hapoel Hevel Modi'in		79–75								Nov 10				Nov 17	
Hapoel Migdal HaEmek/Jezreel										69–89		Nov 20	Nov 10	71–88	
Ironi Nahariya		Nov 14				71–58					80–66				
Ironi Ra'anana				Nov 10			82–75	84–72							Nov 17
Maccabi Kiryat Motzkin					Nov 15	Nov 24							99–90		
Maccabi Mendal Petah Tikva			91–79		84–105	Nov 13					Nov 27				
Maccabi Rehovot		Nov 24			86–88	85–51					Nov 13	93–85			
Otef Darom BC	Nov 14							Nov 27	98–67			87–83			

Updated to match(es) played on November 6, 2026. Source:
Legend: Blue = home team win; Red = away team win.
Matches with lighter background shading were decided after overtime.
