= Aquinas High School (Georgia) =

Private, coeducational, Roman Catholic school in Augusta, Georgia, United States

Location
- 1920 Highland Avenue; Augusta, Georgia 30904; United States; 33°27′41″N 82°2′19″W

Information
- Type: Private, coeducational, Roman Catholic
- Motto: "Developing Christian Leaders"
- Established: 1957
- Headmaster: Maureen Grady Lewis
- Grades: 9–12
- Enrollment: 245
- Classes: College prep and Advanced Placement
- Campus type: Suburban
- Colors: Green and gold
- Nickname: Fightin' Irish
- Accreditation: Southern Association of Colleges and Schools
- Yearbook: The Aquinian
- Affiliation: Irish Catholic; Georgia Association of Independent Schools; Georgia High School Association; National Catholic Educational Association
- Website: www.aquinashigh.org

Aquinas High School is a private, Roman Catholic high school located in midtown Augusta, Georgia, United States. It is accredited by the Southern Association of Colleges and Schools and is a member of the Georgia High School Association and the National Catholic Educational Association.

== Academics ==
"The mission of Aquinas High School is 'developing Christian leaders' through an excellent Catholic secondary education. The school emphasizes moral/ethical standards and strives for a Christian integration of spirit, mind, and body in each student. Aquinas seeks to foster respect for all persons, to encourage responsibility in each individual, and to promote Christian service among its students."

== Organization ==
The school is under the direction of the Roman Catholic Diocese of Savannah with local leadership from the Aquinas School Board. The board's members are the principal, one lay representative from each parish in the Central Savannah River Area, one priest elected by the deanery, three at-large members, and a representative of the Parents' Organization. The board serves as policy advisers for the school.

== History ==
Aquinas High School, a Diocesan Catholic Secondary School, opened in 1957 following the merger of Boys' Catholic High School, operated by the Marist Brothers under the Roman Catholic Diocese of Savannah, and Mt. St. Joseph's Academy, owned and operated by the Sisters of St. Joseph of Carondelet. Aquinas, one of the first co-institutional high schools in the nation, became co-educational in 1969, as recommended by the Southern Association of Colleges and Schools.

On October 5, 2007, Aquinas celebrated its 50th anniversary. During the festivities, a groundbreaking ceremony was held for an expansion of the school which included new classrooms, an improved dining hall, and new kitchen facilities. This new Grand Dining Hall opened in October 2008.

== Notable alumni ==
- Tony Daykin (born 1955), NFL player
- Robert Turner (born 1993), basketball player for Maccabi Ashdod of the Israeli Basketball Premier League

== See also ==
- National Catholic Educational Association
