= Clarke Rosenberg =

American-Israeli basketball player

Clarke Rosenberg קלארק רוזנברג
No. 35 – Maccabi Kiryat Gat
- Position: Shooting guard / point guard
- League: Liga Leumit

Personal information
- Born: April 13, 1993 (age 33) Evanston, Illinois
- Listed height: 6 ft 4 in (1.93 m)
- Listed weight: 195 lb (88 kg)

Career information
- High school: Evanston Township (Evanston, Illinois)
- College: Chicago State (2011–2015)
- NBA draft: 2015: undrafted
- Playing career: 2015–present

Career history
- 2015–2016: Hapoel Holon
- 2016–2017: Migdal HaEmek
- 2017–2018: Elitzur Yavne
- 2018–2019: Ironi Kiryat Ata
- 2019–2020: Hapoel Afula
- 2020: Hapoel Be'er Sheva
- 2020–2021: Elitzur Eito Ashkelon
- 2021–2025: Ironi Nahariya
- 2025–2026: Maccabi Kiryat Gat
- 2026–Present: Elitzur Shomron

Clarke Rosenberg (Hebrew: קלארק רוזנברג; born April 13, 1993) is an American-Israeli professional basketball player for Elitzur Shomron of the Liga Leumit. He plays the shooting guard and point guard positions. Rosenberg played college basketball at Chicago State.

== Personal life ==
Rosenberg was born in Evanston, Illinois, and raised in Skokie, Illinois. He is the son of Jason and Sheila Rosenberg. His father Jason was born to Jewish parents, including Clarke's paternal grandmother, Irma Rosenberg. Clarke became a dual American-Israeli citizen in 2015.

== Basketball career ==
At Evanston Township High School ('11), playing for the Wildkits, Rosenberg averaged 15 points, six rebounds, four assists, and three steals a game in his final season.

He then attended Chicago State University, where Rosenberg played for the Cougars and was the class of 2015. He was known as a playmaker and for a smooth shot. In his sophomore year in 2012-13, he led the Great West Conference in games (33) and was 8th in steals (36). In his junior year in 2013-14 he ranked sixth in the Western Athletic Conference in steals per game (1.4), eighth in free throw percentage (.750), and averaged 14 points per game. In his senior year in 2014-15 he averaged 15 points per game, and was 8th in the WAC in steals per game (1.2) and 10th in free throw percentage (.672).

Rosenberg played for Hapoel Be'er Sheva in the Israeli Basketball Premier League in 2020.
