= Demetrius Treadwell =

American basketball player (born 1991)

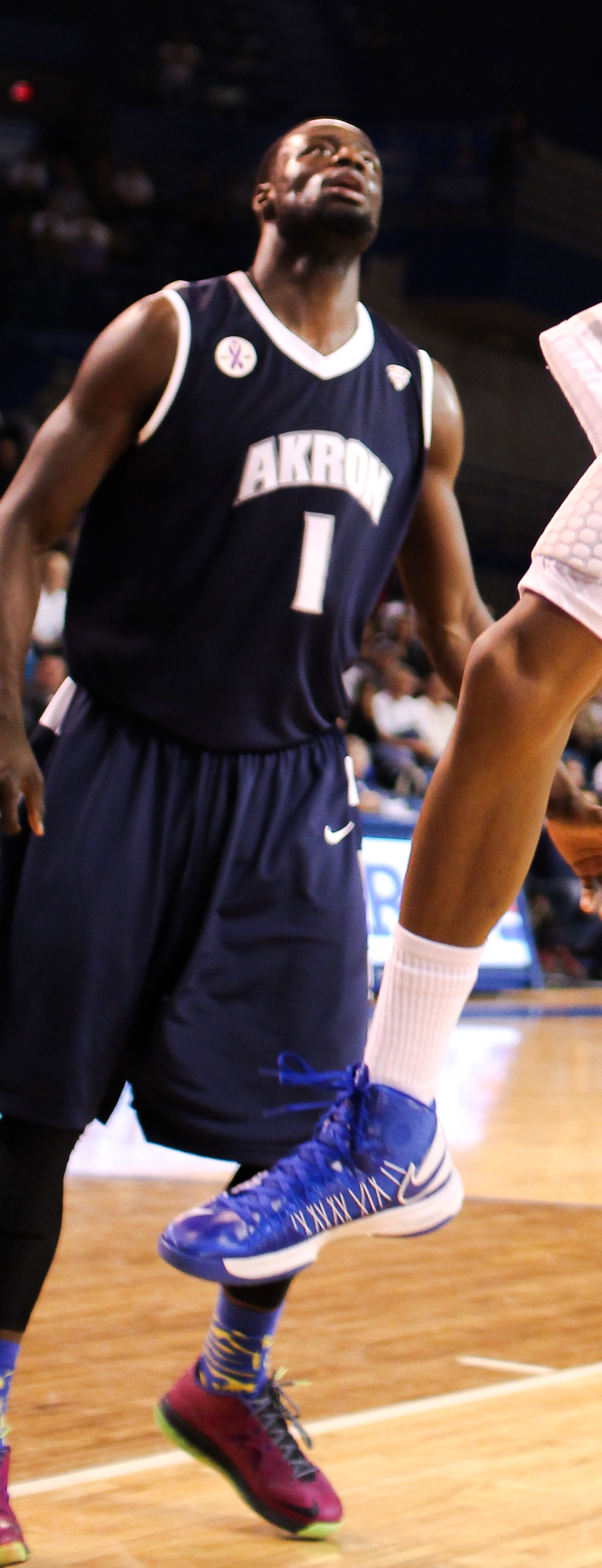
- Treadwell playing for Akron in 2014

No. 1 – Elitzur Shomron
- Position: Power forward / center
- League: Liga Leumit

Personal information
- Born: November 10, 1991 (age 35) Cleveland, Ohio, U.S.
- Listed height: 6 ft 7 in (2.01 m)
- Listed weight: 236 lb (107 kg)

Career information
- High school: Euclid (Euclid, Ohio)
- College: Akron (2011–2014)
- NBA draft: 2015: undrafted
- Playing career: 2015–present

Career history
- 2015: Estudiantes Concordia
- 2015–2016: Hapoel Gilboa Galil
- 2016–2017: Hapoel Afula
- 2017–2018: Hapoel Eilat
- 2018–2019: Nanterre 92
- 2019: Hapoel Tel Aviv
- 2021: CBet Prienai
- 2021–2022: Hapoel Ramat Gan
- 2022: Piratas de Quebradillas
- 2022: Hapoel Hevel Modi'in
- 2022: Wonju DB Promy
- 2022–2023: Goyang Carrot Jumpers
- 2023: Maccabi Ramat Gan
- 2023–2024: Rain or Shine Elasto Painters
- 2024–2025: Maccabi Rehovot
- 2025–present: Elitzur Shomron

Career highlights
- Liga Leumit champion (2016); Israeli Premier League Rebounding Leader (2018); MAC tournament MVP (2013); First-team All-MAC (2014); Second-team All-MAC (2013)

Demetrius "Tree" Treadwell (born November 10, 1991) is an American professional basketball player for Elitzur Shomron of the Israeli Liga Leumit. He played college basketball for the Akron Zips, before playing professionally in Argentina, Israel, and France. In 2017–18, he was the top rebounder in the Israeli Basketball Premier League.

== Early life and college career ==
Treadwell attended Euclid High School in Euclid, Ohio, where he averaged 22.9 points, 16.6 rebounds, 5.0 blocks, 3.3 assists and 2.2 steals per game as a senior. Treadwell earned second team, All-Ohio honors.

Treadwell played college basketball for University of Akron's Zips, where he led the Zips to win the 2013 MAC tournament and was named the Finals MVP in his sophomore year.

In his junior year at Akron, he averaged 15.1 points, 8.6 rebounds and 1.8 assists per game, becoming the first Zip to average at least 15 points and 8 rebounds since Mark Alberts in 1992–93. On March 10, 2014, Treadwell was earned a spot in the All-MAC First-team.

== Professional career ==
=== Argentina (2015) ===
On January 16, 2015, Treadwell started his professional career with Argentinian team Estudiantes Concordia, signing for the rest of the season. On March 24, 2015, Treadwell recorded a career-high 32 points, shooting 12-of-16 from the field, along with 10 rebounds in a 94–64 win over Estudiantes de Bahía Blanca.

=== Israel (2015–2018) ===
On August 26, 2015, Treadwell signed a one-year deal with the Israeli team Hapoel Gilboa Galil of the Israeli National League. In 35 games played for Gilboa Galil, he averaged a double-double of 20.2 points and 10.2 rebounds per game. That season, Treadwell won the National League championship with Gilboa Galil, alongside his teammates Jason Siggers and Joaquin Szuchman.

On August 25, 2016, Treadwell signed with Hapoel Afula for the 2016–17 season.

On July 18, 2017, Treadwell signed a one-year deal with Hapoel Eilat of the Israeli Premier League. On May 7, 2018, Treadwell recorded a season-high 23 points, shooting 9-of-15 from the field, along with 14 rebounds and 3 blocks in a 74–69 win over Maccabi Tel Aviv. Treadwell helped Eilat reach the 2018 Israeli League Playoffs, where they eventually lost to Hapoel Holon. He finished the season as the Israeli League leading rebounder (9.2 per game) and also averaged 12.9 points and 2 assists per game.

=== France (2018–2019) ===
On July 20, 2018, Treadwell signed with the French team Nanterre 92 for the 2018–19 season. Treadwell helped Nanterre reach the 2019 Champions League Quarterfinals, where they eventually were eliminated by Virtus Bologna.

=== Return to Israel (2019–2020) ===
On July 1, 2019, Treadwell returned to Israel for a second stint, signing a one-year deal with Hapoel Tel Aviv. On November 8, 2019, Treadwell has been ruled out for the rest of the season after breaking his tibia during a practice.

=== Lithuania (2021) ===
On January 17, 2021, he has signed with CBet Prienai of the Lithuanian Basketball League. Treadwell played three games and averaged 2.7 points and 2.3 rebounds per game.

=== Return to Israel (2021–2022) ===
On September 20, 2021, Treadwell signed with Hapoel Ramat Gan Givatayim of the Liga Leumit.

=== Puerto Rico (2022) ===
On May 2, 2022, he has signed with Piratas de Quebradillas of the Puerto Rican Baloncesto Superior Nacional (BSN).

=== Rain or Shine Elasto Painters (2023–2024) ===
In November 2023, Treadwell signed with the Rain or Shine Elasto Painters of the Philippine Basketball Association (PBA) to replace DaJuan Summers as the team's import for the 2023–24 PBA Commissioner's Cup.

=== Maccabi Rehovot (2024–present) ===
On September 8, 2024, Treadwell signed with the Maccabi Rehovot of the Liga Leumit.
