= Dakarai Tucker =

American basketball player (born 1994)

No. 7 – EWE Baskets Oldenburg
- Position: Shooting guard
- League: Basketball Bundesliga

Personal information
- Born: May 13, 1994 (age 32) Gardena, California, U.S.
- Listed height: 6 ft 5 in (1.96 m)
- Listed weight: 195 lb (88 kg)

Career information
- High school: Junípero Serra (Gardena, California)
- College: Utah (2012–2016)
- NBA draft: 2016: undrafted
- Playing career: 2016–present

Career history
- 2016: Salt Lake City Stars
- 2018–2019: Rio Grande Valley Vipers
- 2019–2020: Szolnoki Olajbányász
- 2021: Iowa Wolves
- 2021–2022: Ironi Ramat Gan
- 2022–2023: Elitzur Eito Ashkelon
- 2023–2024: Hapoel Haifa
- 2024–2025: Hapoel Holon
- 2025–present: EWE Baskets Oldenburg

Dakarai Tucker (born May 13, 1994) is an American basketball player for EWE Baskets Oldenburg in the Basketball Bundesliga (BBL). He played college basketball for the Utah Utes.

== High school ==
Tucker played basketball at Serra High School in Gardena, California. As a senior he averaged 12.4 points, 5.0 rebounds, 1.4 assists, and 1.5 steals per game, and hit 80% of his free throws. He was named the 2011-12 CIF Southern Section Player of the Year, first-team All-Div. 4, and an Honorable Mention All-State selection by Max Preps.

== College career ==
Tucker came to Utah from. As a freshman, Tucker came off the bench, averaging 11.1 minutes, 3.1 points, and 1.2 rebounds per game. He had season highs of 15 points, 5 rebounds, and 3 steals. As a sophomore, Tucker started 22 of the 33 games that season, averaging 6.8 points and 1.8 rebounds, and was sixth in the Pac-12 in three-point field goal percentage at 41.4%. Tucker was an Honorable Mention All-Academic Pac-12 selection.

As a junior, Tucker started 3 games, averaging 7.2 points and 2.4 rebounds per game, shooting 81.8% from the free throw line, helping his team reach a record of 26–9, 2nd in the Pac-12. His senior year saw a decline in his minutes, as he went from 20.2 minutes per game as a junior to 18.5 minutes per game. He did not start in a single game, and averaged 5.4 points and 2.4 rebounds.

== Professional career ==
On October 31, 2016, Tucker tried out with the Salt Lake City Stars. After playing one game, in which he scored six points, he was placed on waivers.

On April 4, 2017, the Rio Grande Valley Vipers claimed Tucker, and played the remainder of the postseason with them. On October 20, 2018, Tucker returned to the Vipers, and played 49 games, starting in 22 of them. He averaged 13 points, 3.2 rebounds, and 1.6 assists per game., and shot 81% from the free throw line. In 2019, Tucker played two games on the Phoenix Suns Summer League team.

On July 23, 2019, Tucker signed with Szolnoki Olajbányász of the Hungarian league. He averaged 15.6 points, 5.4 rebounds, and 1.8 assists per game, with an .872 free throw percentage.

Tucker was selected 17th overall in the 2021 NBA G League draft by the Iowa Wolves. He averaged 11.1 points, 3.3 rebounds, 2.3 assists and 1.4 steals per game with the Wolves, and shot 87% from the free throw line.

On August 5, 2021, Tucker signed with Ironi Ramat Gan of the Liga Leumit. He averaged 16.4 points, 4.4 rebounds, and 2.2 assists per game, and shot 87% from the free throw line.

On September 1, 2022, he signed with Hapoel Galil Elyon of the Israeli Basketball Premier League.

In 2023 he signed with Hapoel Haifa of the Israeli Basketball Premier League. He averaged 13.9 points, 4.4 rebounds, and 2.1 assists per game. On July 9, 2024, Tucker signed with Hapoel Holon.

On July 9, 2024, he signed with Hapoel Holon of the Israeli Basketball Premier League.

On July 16, 2025, he signed with EWE Baskets Oldenburg in the Basketball Bundesliga (BBL).

== Career statistics ==
Legend
GP	Games played	GS	Games started	MPG	Minutes per game
FG%	Field goal percentage	3P%	3-point field goal percentage	FT%	Free throw percentage
RPG	Rebounds per game	APG	Assists per game	SPG	Steals per game
BPG	Blocks per game	PPG	Points per game	**Bold**	Career high

=== College ===
Year	Team	GP	GS	MPG	FG%	3P%	FT%	RPG	APG	SPG	BPG	PPG
2012–13	Utah	25	1	11.1	.508	.394	.600	1.2	0.4	0.4	0.2	3.1
2013–14	Utah	33	22	20.1	.435	.392	.850	1.8	0.8	0.3	0.1	6.8
2014–15	Utah	31	3	20.2	.437	.360	.818	2.4	0.6	0.4	.0.3	7.2
2015–16	Utah	36	0	18.5	.434	.417	.759	2.4	0.7	0.4	0.4	5.4
Career		125	26	17.9	.443	.390	.796	2.0	0.6	0.4	0.4	5.7
