= Robert Turner (basketball) =

American basketball player (born 1993)

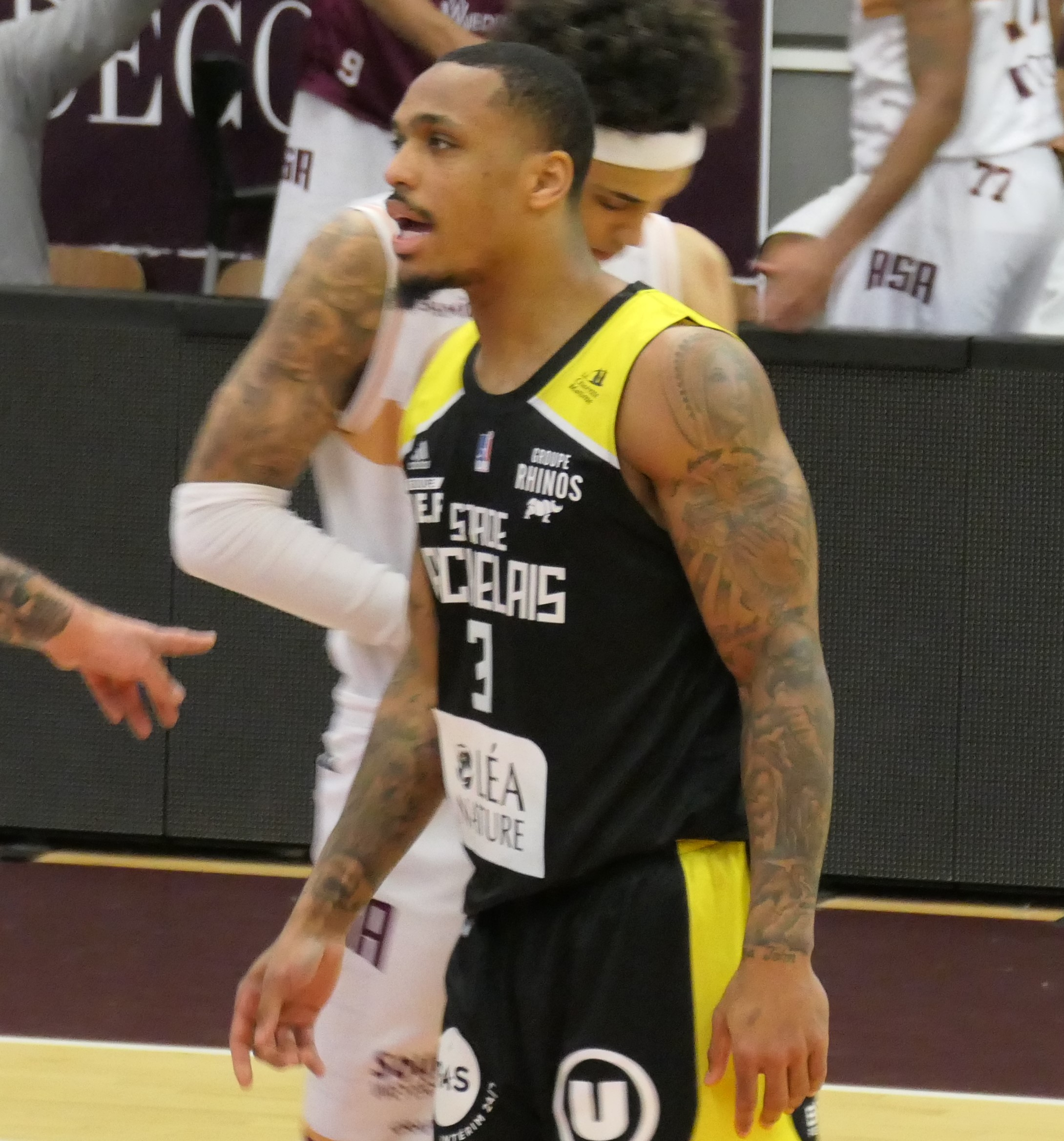
- Turner in January 2023 with Rochelais

No. 3 – Maccabi Ashdod
- Position: Point guard
- League: Israeli Basketball Premier League

Personal information
- Born: April 8, 1993 (age 33) Augusta, Georgia, U.S.
- Listed height: 6 ft 3 in (1.91 m)
- Listed weight: 180 lb (82 kg)

Career information
- High school: Lucy C. Laney (Augusta, Georgia)
- College: NMJC (2012–2013); Texas Tech (2013–2015)

Career history
- 2015: Georgia Kingz
- 2016: Darkhan Garid
- 2016: Fort Gordon Eagles
- 2016: Zavkhan
- 2016–2017: Arhangai Altan
- 2017–2018: BC Orchies
- 2018–2019: Força Lleida
- 2019: Augusta Eagles
- 2019–2021: Aurore de Vitre
- 2021–2022: Stjarnan
- 2023: Stade Rochelais
- 2023: Le Portel
- 2024–2025: Fos Provence
- 2025: Zastal Zielona Góra
- 2026–present: Maccabi Ashdod

Career highlights
- Israeli National League champion (2026) & major individual awards (Player of the Year, Defensive POY, Guard of the Year, First-team All-League, Finals MVP, and Import POY) (2026); LNB Pro B scoring leader (2024); Úrvalsdeild karla scoring leader (2023); Icelandic Cup (2022); Mongolian Superleague champion, MVP, First-team All-League, scoring leader, All-Star, Finals MVP, and Slam Dunk winner (2017)

Robert Eugene Turner III (born April 8, 1993) is an American professional basketball player for Maccabi Ashdod of the Israeli Basketball Premier League.

Turner played college basketball for New Mexico Junior College and Texas Tech University. He then played basketball professionally in Asia and Europe. In 2017, he won the Mongolian Superleague with Arhangai Altan, was league scoring leader, and was named MVP. In 2022 he won the Icelandic Cup with Stjarnan.

He had back-to-back scoring titles in Iceland's Úrvalsdeild karla (2022–23) and France's LNB Pro B (2023–24). Turner then led Maccabi Ashdod to a Israeli National League title and promotion to the Israeli Basketball Premier League, while winning Player of the Year, Defensive Player of the Year, and Finals MVP honors (2025–26).

== High school ==
Turner attended and played basketball for Aquinas High School. He then transferred and played his senior season at Lucy Craft Laney High School in Augusta, Georgia.

== College career ==
=== New Mexico Junior College ===
He began his college career at New Mexico Junior College, averaging 5.1 points, 1.8 rebounds, and 1.4 assists per game as a freshman in 2011–12 in the Western Junior College Athletic Conference (WJCAC). As a sophomore in 2012–13, Turner averaged 9.8 points, 2.3 rebounds, and 2.8 assists per game across 30 games, earning honorable mention All-WJCAC honors.

=== Texas Tech ===
Transferring to Texas Tech, Turner started all 32 games as a junior in 2013–14, averaging 9.3 points, 2.6 rebounds, 2.6 assists, and 1.3 steals per game. As a senior in 2014–15, he started 29 of 32 games and averaged 8.3 points, 2.9 rebounds, and 1.8 assists per game.

== Professional career ==
=== Georgia Kingz ===
After graduating from Texas Tech in 2015, Turner began his professional career with the Atlanta, Georgia, Georgia Kingz of the semi-pro/minor league Premier Basketball Association.

=== Darkhan Garid, Fort Gordon Eagles, ZavkhanTaimens, and Arhangai Altan ===
In 2016, he signed with Darkhan Garid of the Mongolian Superleague, where Turner averaged 23.0 points, 12.0 rebounds, and 8.5 assists per game. He also played in the East Coast Basketball League (ECBL) for the Fort Gordon Eagles in Augusta, Georgia, before returning to Mongolia later that year to join the Zavkhan Taimens.

For the 2016–17 season, Turner joined Arhangai Altan of the Mongolian Superleague. In 14 regular-season games with Arhangai Altan, he averaged 33.4 minutes, 27.0 points (leading the league), 7.2 rebounds, 5.2 assists, and 2.9 steals per game while shooting 38.0% from three-point range and 76.0% from the free-throw line, before averaging over 36 points per game in the playoffs. In January 2017, he was named a Mongolian Superleague All-Star, scoring 15 points in the All-Star Game and winning the Slam Dunk Contest. In March 2017, he recorded 15 points, 7 rebounds, and 7 assists in a 96–92 Game 5 victory over Alianz Tech to clinch the Mongolian Superleague championship, earning Finals MVP honors as well as league MVP and First-Team All-League selections.

=== BC Orchies ===
In 2017-18, Turner played for BC Orchies of the Nationale Masculine 1. In 19 games he averaged 28.9 minutes, 17.3 points, 3.7 rebounds, 4.5 assists, and 1.4 steals per game, while shooting 51.4% from the field.

=== Forca Lleida CE and Augusta Eagles ===
In 2018-19, he played for Forca Lleida CE of the Primera FEB. In 22 games, Turner averaged 22.9 minutes, 9.9 points, 2.2 rebounds, and 2.2 assists per game. In 2019, he briefly returned to the United States to play for the Augusta Eagles of the East Coast Basketball League.

=== Aurore de Vitré ===
In 2019-20, Turner played for Aurore de Vitré of the Nationale Masculine 1. In 26 games, he averaged 30.6 minutes, 20.3 points (second in the league), 4.7 rebounds, 2.8 assists, and 1.6 steals per game, while shooting 47.9% from the field and 43.1% from three-point range.

He re-signed with the team, and in 2020-21 Turner played in 25 games. He averaged 30.4 minutes, 20.3 points, 3.6 rebounds, 3.2 assists, and 1.4 steals per game, and was named Eurobasket.com All-French NM1.

=== Stjarnan ===
Turner joined Stjarnan of the Icelandic top-tier Úrvalsdeild karla in 2021. He helped the team win the Icelandic Cup in January 2022. Turner led the team in scoring and assists with 23.2 points, 7.0 rebounds, 5.2 assists, and 1.9 steals per game, while shooting 48.8% from the field. He helped the team win the Icelandic Cup in January 2022.

Turner re-signed with the team for the following season. In December 2022, Stjarnan announced that Turner's contract had been bought out by a French Pro B club. Despite playing in only 11 games, he led the Úrvalsdeild in scoring with 29.0 points and 34.3 minutes per game, while shooting 50.6% from the field.

=== Stade Rochelais Basket ===
On January 2, 2023, he signed with Stade Rochelais Basket of the LNB Pro B. In 21 games, Turner averaged 30.6 minutes, 21.6 points, 4.0 rebounds, and 2.0 assists per game, finishing second in the league in scoring, while shooting 46.7% from the floor.

=== ESSM Le Portel ===
In October 2023, he signed with ESSM Le Portel of the top-tier LNB Élite. In 14 games, Turner averaged 24.0 minutes, 9.5 points, 1.7 rebounds, and 2.0 assists per game.

=== Fos Provence Basket ===
In January 2024, Turner returned to the LNB Pro B with Fos Provence Basket. In 20 games, he led the league in scoring at 18.4 points per game alongside 33.5 minutes, 3.4 rebounds, and 2.8 assists per game.

He re-signed with the team for the 2024–25 season. In 25 games, Turner ranked fifth in the league in scoring with 17.4 points per game while averaging 32.6 minutes, 3.6 rebounds, and 3.2 assists per game.

=== Zastal Zielona Góra ===
In March 2025, Turner joined Zastal Zielona Góra of the Polish Basketball League for the remainder of the 2024–25 season. In 5 games, he averaged 16.7 minutes, 3.0 points, and 1.4 assists per game.

=== Maccabi Ashdod ===
For the 2025–26 season, Turner signed with Maccabi Ashdod of the Israeli National League. In 40 games, he averaged 24.2 points (third in the league), 5.1 rebounds, 4.9 assists, and 1.5 steals per game, shooting 45.1% from the field, helping the club win the league championship and earn promotion to the Israeli Basketball Premier League. For his performance, he was named the Israeli National League Player of the Year, Defensive Player of the Year, Guard of the Year, First-Team All-League, Import Player of the Year, All-Imports Team, and Finals MVP.

Turner re-signed with the team for the 2026-27 season.

== Personal life ==
Turner was born to LaTanya and Robert Turner Jr., the middle of five children.
