= Raviv Pitshon =

Israeli basketball player (born 1989)

Raviv Pitshon רביב פיטשון
Maccabi Kiryat Gat
- Position: Power forward
- League: Liga Leumit

Personal information
- Born: October 27, 1989 (age 37) Holon, Israel
- Listed height: 2.02 m (6 ft 8 in)

Career information
- Playing career: 2007–present

Career history
- 2007–2008: Maccabi Ashdod
- 2008–2009: Elitzue Kochav Yair
- 2009–2010: Hapoel Holon
- 2010: Elitzur Ramla
- 2010–2011: Hapoel HaSharon
- 2011–2012: Ironi Ramat Gan
- 2012: Maccabi Rishon LeZion
- 2012–2013: Ironi Nahariya
- 2013: Maccabi Hod HaSharon
- 2013–2015: Ironi Ashkelon
- 2015–2016: Hapoel Gilboa Galil
- 2016–2020: Ironi Ness Ziona
- 2020–2026: Maccabi Ashdod
- 2026–present: Maccabi Kiryat Gat

Raviv Pitchon (Hebrew: רביב פיטשון; born October 27, 1989) is an Israeli professional basketball player for Maccabi Kiryat Gat of the Liga Leumit. He mainly plays the power forward position.

== Biography ==
Pitshon was born and raised in Holon. He started playing basketball in the youth department of Hapoel Holon at the age of 5. He played in the various teams of the club up to the youth team. In the 2006/7 season, he reached the National Youth Cup final with his team, where the team lost to Maccabi Tel Aviv. In the game, he excelled with 30 points and 17 rebounds. That season, in the National Youth League (the senior league at the time) the team was eliminated in the semi-finals by Ramat Gan. Pitchon was named player of the season among the players of the southern teams.

He studied at the Kiryat Sharet Holon school where he played for the basketball team. In the 11th grade, the team reached the semifinals against Sharett Netanya High School. A year later, Pitshon was elected to the top five of the season and the king of the baskets of the high school league.

== Professional career ==
His first season in the senior team was the 2007/8 season, during which he played for the first time in the senior team of Maccabi Ashdod from the National Basketball League. At the end of the season, he moved to play for Elitzur Kochav Yair. In the 2009/10 season, he returned to play for Hapoel Holon from the Premier League in basketball. In his record game against Bnei Hasharon, he scored 10 points in the first quarter and helped the team win the 500th victory of all time. A few months later that season, he moved to play until the end of the season in Elitzur Neve-David Ramla from the national league with which he reached the quarterfinals of the playoffs at the end of the season. In June 2010 he participated with the Air Force team in the IDF Basketball Championship, in the final game the Air Force team defeated the Northern Command. This season, which was stopped in the quarterfinals of the playoffs, he scored 9.2 points and took an average of 5.8 rebounds per game. The playoffs, Scored 9.9 points and averaged 7.5 rebounds per game. He started the 2012/13 season in the Maccabi Rishon Lezion team and a few months later moved on to play until the end of the season in the Nahariya Urban team that qualified for the playoff semifinals. This season he scored 10.7 points and averaged 9.3 rebounds per game. He started the 2013/14 season with the Maccabi Hod Hasharon team and a few months later moved to Elitzur Ashkelon where he played a season and a half. In the first season, he scored 16.3 points and took 8 rebounds and in the second season the team scored 12.1 points and took an average of 8.5 rebounds per game. He won his first championship in the 2015/16 season with the Hapoel Gilboa Galil team. The team coached by Ariel Beit Halachmi won the National Basketball League Championship. Another national championship recorded in the 2016/17 season in Nes Ziona When at the end of the final series against Hapoel Be'er Sheva / Bnei Shimon she was promoted to the Premier League. Pitchon continued to play in the team in the Premier League. In August 2018, he extended his contract for another two years. On July 31, 2020, he signed with Maccabi Ashdod.

== International team ==
Pitchon played for Israel's youth and reserve teams. In the summer of 2007, he participated in the European Under-18 Championships held in Madrid. In the championship, he excelled with 14.9 points and 10.4 rebounds in the country per game (second place in the ranking of all players) and out of them 5.1 rebounds in the attack (first in the ranking).

In the summer of 2008, he participated with the reserve team in the European Under-20 Championships held in Riga. And in 2009 participated in the European Under-20 Championships held in Rhodes. In 2011 he attended Shenzhen University as part of the young team under coach Roni Busani. Pitchon recorded a record appearance in the winning game against Australia with 16 points and 17 rebounds at the end of the main competition and was ranked 14th.
