= Jimmy Hall (basketball) =

American basketball player (born 1994)

Hapoel Afula
- Position: Power forward
- League: Israeli National League

Personal information
- Born: April 2, 1994 (age 32) Brooklyn, New York, U.S.
- Listed height: 6 ft 8 in (2.03 m)
- Listed weight: 235 lb (107 kg)

Career information
- High school: St. Anthony (Jersey City, New Jersey)
- College: Hofstra (2012–2013); Kent State (2014–2017)
- NBA draft: 2017: undrafted
- Playing career: 2017–present

Career highlights
- 3× First-team All-MAC (2015–2017)

Jimmy Hall (born April 2, 1994) is an American basketball player. He plays the power forward position. He played college basketball for Hofstra University, and for Kent State, where he was All-Mid-American Conference (MAC) First Team for three seasons in a row. He has played most of his professional career in Israel, including for Hapoel Holon of the Israeli Basketball Premier League, and plays for Hapoel Afula of the Israeli National League.

== Early life ==
Hall was born in Brooklyn, New York, and his parents are Noreen Stallings and Jimmy Hall. His siblings are Norvonee, Nalyssa, and Leonissa. He is 6 feet 8 inches (203 cm), and weighs 235 pounds (107 kg).

== High school ==
Hall played at St. Anthony High School ('12) in Jersey City, New Jersey, under head coach Bob Hurley. He averaged 5.7 points and 3.3 rebounds per game in his junior season to help the Friars to an undefeated 33–0 record, NJSIAA Tournament of Champions title, and No. 1 national ranking in both the USA Today Super 25 and ESPN Powerade Fab 50 polls.

== College ==
=== Hofstra ===
Hall attended Hofstra University in Hempstead, New York, on scholarship in 2012–13, and played in seven games for the school. He averaged 12.7 points, 9.4 rebounds, and 1.4 blocks per game for the Hofstra Pride. He earned Colonial Athletic Association Rookie of the Week honors.

Hall became involved with three teammates stealing $10,000 of iPads and computers in six burglaries from student dorms, and all of them were arrested on burglary charges, arraigned at First District Court in Hempstead, and dismissed from Hofstra. After his arrest he was initially held in East Meadow, New York, county jail. His charge, originally four counts of second degree burglary, was ultimately reduced to a misdemeanor. He then briefly attended a community college in Brooklyn.

=== Kent State ===
He then transferred to Kent State in Kent, Ohio, in August 2013, where Hall majored in Communication Studies. He sat out in 2013–14, in accordance with NCAA transfer rules. In 2014–15, in his redshirt sophomore season, he played in 30 games for the Golden Flashes and averaged 15.9 points (6th in the Mid-American Conference (MAC)), 7.7 rebounds per game (5th), and 1.0 blocks per game (10th). His two-point field goal percentage was .533 (10th). He was named All-MAC First Team, and National Association of Basketball Coaches (NABC) All-District 14 Second Team.

In his 2015–16 redshirt junior season, Hall averaged 16.4 points per game (6th in MAC), 7.9 rebounds per game (6th), 2.9 offensive rebounds per game (3rd), and 5.0 defensive rebounds per game (8th). He was All-MAC First Team, named to the Lou Henson Award preseason watch list, and named NABC All-District 14 First Team.

In 2016–17 Hall averaged 19.0 points per game (5th in MAC), 10.6 rebounds per game (3rd, and 10th in the NCAA), and 1.3 blocks per game (2nd). His free throw percentage was .777 (9th). He scored 683 points, the most in Kent history, with 383 rebounds, second-most in Kent history. He was named All-MAC First Team for his third season in a row.

His career 8.69 rebounds per game were 7th-highest in the MAC. Hall was the only Kent player to ever finish his career with 1,600 points and 800 rebounds, and his 1,683 career points are third-most in Kent history. His 672 field goals are the most in school history, and his 867 rebounds are second in school history.

== Professional career ==
=== France ===
Hall began his professional career playing in the 2017–18 season for STB Le Havre in Ligue Nationale de Basket's Pro B division in France. He averaged 5.5 points and 2 rebounds per game.

=== Israel ===
Hall then played for Hapoel Migdal Haemek in the Israeli National League in the 2017–18 season. In 24 games, he scored 20.4 points per game and had 11.3 rebounds per game.

=== Mexico ===
In May 2018 at 24 years of age Hall joined the Halcones de Ciudad Obregón in Mexico, of the Circuito de Baloncesto de la Costa del Pacífico (CIBACOPA). In 2018 for the team, in 18 games he averaged 13.6 points and 9.3 rebounds per game.

=== Israel redux ===
Hall then played for Ironi Kiryat Ata of the Israeli National League in 2018–19. He averaged 18.2 points per game, 11.5 rebounds per game (5th in the National League), and 2.7 assists per game. He was named Eurobasket.com All-Israeli National League Honorable Mention.

Hall played for Hapoel Holon of the Israeli Basketball Premier League in the 2019–20 season. He averaged 16.7 points and 8.9 rebounds per game.

He played for Maccabi Hod HaSharon of the Israeli National League, averaging 18.9 points and 13.6 rebounds and four assists in 2020. Hall was named Eurobasket.com All-Israeli National League 2nd Team.

Hall then played for Hapoel Afula of the Israeli National League in 2020–21.

He played for Hapoel Hevel Modi'in of the Israeli National League in 2021–22. In 36 games Hall averaged 19.5 points per game, 12.8 rebounds per game, and 4.2 assists per game.

Hall plays for Hapoel Afula of the Israeli National League as of 2022.

== Personal life ==
Hall has a daughter, named Amara.
