= Maccabi Ma'ale Adumim B.C. =

Basketball team in Israel

Maccabi Ma'ale Adumim
- Leagues: Liga Artzit
- Founded: 2006; 20 years ago
- Arena: HaPais Hall (Ulema)
- Capacity: 400
- Location: Ma'ale Adumim
- Team colors: Blue and white

Maccabi Ma'ale Adumim (Hebrew: מכבי מעלה אדומים) is a professional basketball club based in Ma'ale Adumim, an Israeli settlement in the West Bank. The team plays in the Liga Artzit.

== Club history ==
The club first joined the Israeli Basketball Association in 2006. In 2015, they won the Union Cup. They played in the Liga Artzit, the Israeli third division, until 2021 when they were promoted to the Israeli National League after finishing first in the Artzit standings.

They became the first team from Judea-Samari to participate in either of Israel's top two men's basketball leagues. In their first season in the National League in 2021–22, Ma'ale Adumim finished 11th out of 15 teams with an 11–17 record.

The team hosted its home games at Givat Ram in Jerusalem in 2021–22 due to their home hall not meeting the standards required for National League games. In the opening game of the 2022–23 season, Ma'ale Adumim hosted their first National League game at its home Ulema. Following the 2023–24 season, the team was relegated back down to Liga Artzit.

== Notable players ==
- (United States) Keith Braxton
- (United States) (Israel) Jordan Cohen
- (United States) Duane Johnson
- (United States) Jalen Tate
