= HaKiriya Arena =

Sports arena in Ashdod, Israel

Coordinates: 31.793537°N 34.64044°E

HaKirya Arena
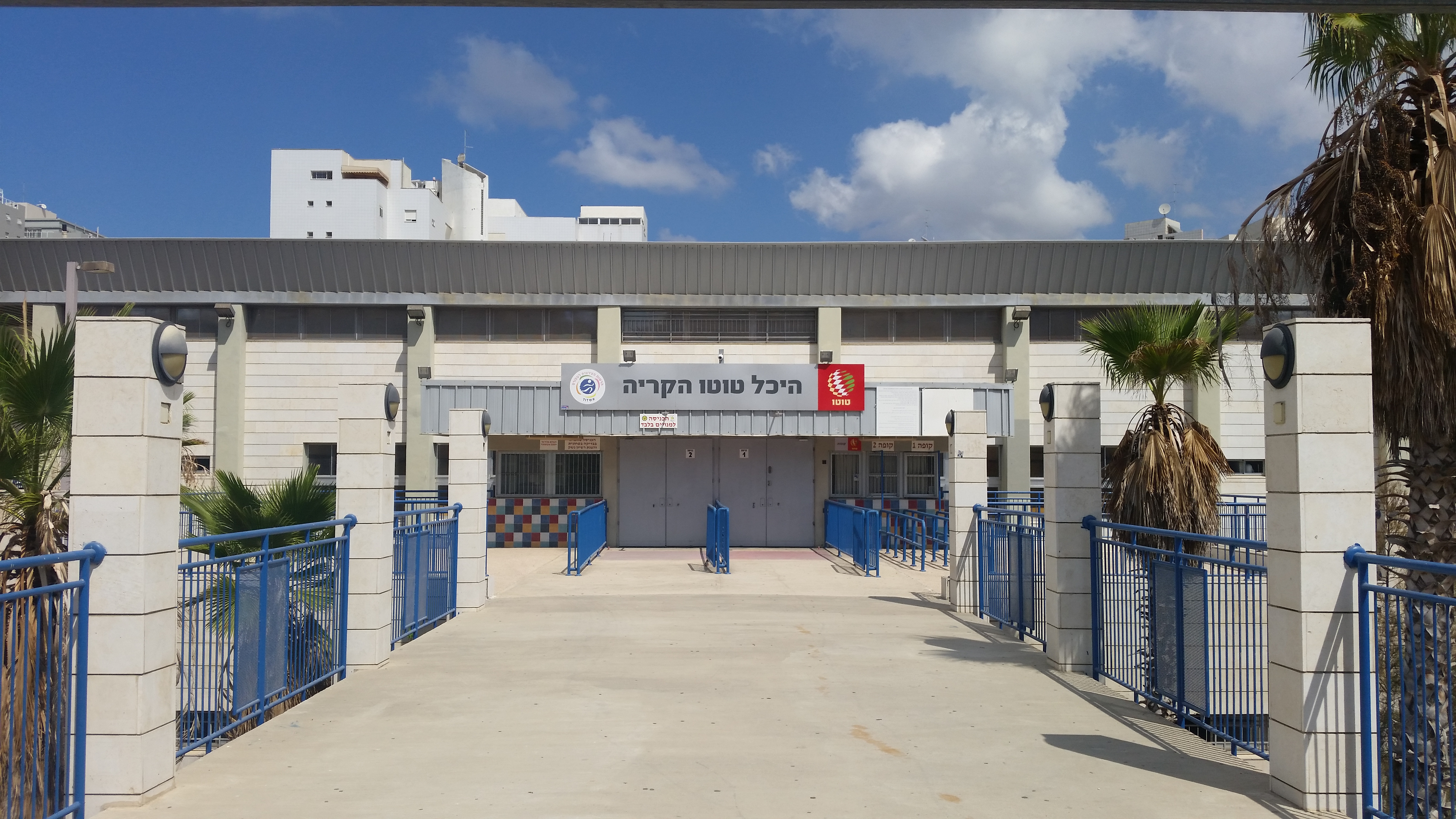
- Interactive map of HaKirya Arena
- Location: 60 HaAtzma'ut Street, Ashdod
- Owner: Ashdod City Council
- Operator: Sport Palaces Ltd
- Capacity: 2,200 (basketball); 1,600 (handball and tennis)

Construction
- Opened: 2000
- Expanded: 2014

Tenants
- Maccabi Ashdod; Maccabi Bnot Ashdod

The HaKirya Arena (Hebrew: היכל טוטו הקריה, Heyhal Toto HaKirya) is an indoor sporting arena located in Ashdod, Israel. The arena opened in 2000 and is home for the Maccabi Ashdod and Maccabi Bnot Ashdod basketball clubs.

The arena has around 1,600 permanent seats and around 600 seats in removable stands, allowing for capacities of 2,200 for basketball games and 1,600 for handball and tennis matches.

== See also ==
- Sports in Israel
