= Hapoel Afula B.C. =

Hapoel Afula מועדון כדורסל הפועל עפולה
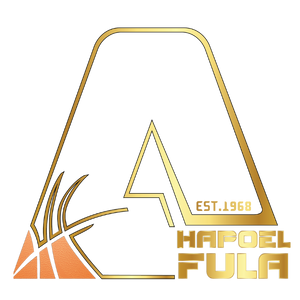
- Leagues: Liga Leumit
- Founded: 1968; 58 years ago
- Arena: Afula Illit Hall (capacity: 1,000)
- Location: Afula, Israel
- Team colors: Black and white
- President: Yosi Malka
- Team manager: Yosi Malka
- Head coach: Ariel Beit-Halahmy
Home	Away

Hapoel Afula (Hebrew: הפועל עפולה) is a basketball club based in Afula, Israel. It currently plays in the Liga Leumit, the second tier of professional basketball in Israel. There were multiple times and seasons where the team has been promoted to the Israeli Basketball Premier League, most recently in 2008–2009.

== History ==
The club was established in 1968, and was a member of the top division during the 1970s and 1980s. A decline saw the club merge with Hapoel Gilboa to form Hapoel Gilboa/Afula. The merged club played in the top division until 2008, when they were relegated after finishing bottom.

In June 2008 the merged club was disbanded, and Hapoel Afula became an independent club again (while Hapoel Gilboa would receive the top-division license of Hapoel Galil Elyon to form a new team, Hapoel Gilboa Galil). In their first season, Afula won the Liga Leumit play-off against Hapoel Lev HaSharon 3-1, and returned to the top division.

After one season, the group returned to the second division because the management could not arrange a suitable budget.

== Roster ==
Hapoel Afula roster
Players
Coaches

Pos.	No.	Nat.	Name	Ht.	Age
G/F	1	(Israel) (United States)	Cohen, Sandy	1.98 m (6 ft 6 in)	31 – 22 September 1995
G	3	(United States)	Ellis, El	1.91 m (6 ft 3 in)	26 – 18 December 1999
F	5	(United States)	Tokoto, JP	2.01 m (6 ft 7 in)	33 – 15 September 1993
G	7	(Israel)	Drapic, Dolev	1.91 m (6 ft 3 in)	33 – 23 December 1992
F/C	8	(Israel)	Levi, Aviel	2.03 m (6 ft 8 in)	28 – 6 April 1998
G	9	(Israel)	Kikus, Maxim	1.88 m (6 ft 2 in)	32 – 2 February 1994
G	11	(United States)	Shungu, Ben	1.91 m (6 ft 3 in)	29 – 4 October 1997
F/C	14	(Israel)	Ovadia, Ori	2.02 m (6 ft 8 in)	21 – 24 February 2005
F/C	15	(Israel) (United States)	Labanowski, Sean	2.04 m (6 ft 8 in)	33 – 9 December 1992
G	17	(Israel)	Geffen, Rom	1.93 m (6 ft 4 in)	32 – 17 August 1994
PG	23	(Israel)	Lutaty, Moriel	1.83 m (6 ft 0 in)	26 – 12 December 1999
F	25	(United States)	Mutts, Justyn	2.01 m (6 ft 7 in)	27 – 4 January 1999
PF	55	(Israel)	Avivi, Noam	2.06 m (6 ft 9 in)	27 – 25 February 1999

Head coach

- (Israel) Nir Kaplan

Assistant coach(es)

- (Israel) Alon Merli

Legend

- (C) Team captain
- Injured

- Roster
Updated: May 1, 2025

=== Depth chart ===
Pos.	Starting 5	Bench 1	Bench 2
C	Sean Labanowski	Aviel Levi
PF	JP Tokoto	Noam Avivi	Ori Ovadia
SF	Justyn Mutts	Sandy Cohen
SG	Ben Shungu	Dolev Drapic	Maxim Kikus
PG	Moriel Lutaty	El Ellis	Rom Geffen

- The Israeli League rule requires every team to have at least one Israeli on the court at any time.
- There should be at least 7 Israelis and up to 5 foreigners on a 12-men game sheet.

== Notable players ==
- (Trinidad and Tobago) Maurice Joseph
- (United States) Jeff Allen
- (United States) David Ancrum
- (United States) Jimmy Hall (born 1994)
