= Hapoel Hevel Modi'in B.C. =

Hapoel Hevel Modi'in
- Leagues: Israeli National League
- Arena: Nachshon Hall
- Capacity: 370
- Location: Hevel Modi'in
- Team colors: Red and White
- Head coach: Alon Stein
- Team captain: Tony Younger
Home	Away

Hapoel Hevel Modi'in (Hebrew: הפועל חבל מודיעין) is a professional basketball club based in Hevel Modi'in Regional Council of Israel. The team plays in the Israeli National League.

== History ==
Hapoel Hevel Modi'in have played most of their years in Liga Alef, the fourth and lowest level tier in Israeli basketball, until the 2017–18 season, where they have qualified to the Liga Artzit as the Liga Alef champions. On June 11, 2017, They have appointed Pini Gershon as Hevel Modi'in new general manager. He has resigned from his position on August 8, 2019.

In the 2018–19 season, Hevel Modi'in have won the 2019 Liga Artzit championship title, earning a promotion to the Israeli National League for the first time in their history.

== Current roster ==
Hapoel Hevel Modi'in roster
Players
Coaches

Pos.	No.	Nat.	Name	Ht.	Age
G	5	(Israel)	Nissim-Cohen, Raz	1.89 m (6 ft 2 in)	35 – 7 March 1991
G/F	6	(Israel)	Mosindi, David	1.93 m (6 ft 4 in)	29 – 16 July 1997
G/F	8	(Israel)	Henkin, Aviv	1.97 m (6 ft 6 in)	20 – 30 April 2006
G	10	(Israel)	Lev, Orel	1.93 m (6 ft 4 in)	33 – 4 June 1993
G	11	(Israel)	Garmizo, Ori	1.94 m (6 ft 4 in)	31 – 9 October 1994
G	12	(Israel)	Spector, Tom	1.88 m (6 ft 2 in)	28 – 12 January 1998
C	13	(Israel)	Bier-Katz, Amit	2.08 m (6 ft 10 in)	37 – 8 December 1988
PG	15	(Israel)	Skverer, Alan	1.85 m (6 ft 1 in)	33 – 15 June 1993

Head coach

- (Israel) Alon Stein

Legend

- (C) Team captain
- Injured

- Roster
Updated: January 1, 2025

== Notable alumni ==
- Jimmy Hall (born 1994)
