= A.S. Ironi Ashkelon =

- Leagues: Liga Leumit
- Founded: 2015; 11 years ago
- History: Elitzur Eito Ashkelon; 2015–2024; A.S. Elitzur Ashkelon; 2024–present
- Arena: Ashkelon Sport Arena
- Capacity: 3,000
- Location: Ashkelon, Israel
- Team colors: Blue, White
- CEO: Gal Leibovich
- General manager: Roei Berkowitz
- Head coach: David Elharar
Home	Away

A.S. Ironi Ashkelon (Hebrew: א.ס. עירוני אשקלון) is a professional basketball team based in Ashkelon, south west Israel. The club currently plays in the Liga Leumit, the second division of professional basketball in Israel. The team is named after the late Itamar Sharvit (nicknamed "Eito"), who has been Elizur Ashkelon's maintenance manager for 18 years.

== History ==
The team was founded in 2015 after Elitzur Ashkelon has been dissolved.

In the 2017–18 season, the team has been promoted to the Israeli National League after winning the Liga Artzit championship title.

In the 2018–19 season, they have qualified to the national league playoffs, where they eventually were eliminated by Hapoel Galil Elyon in the Quarterfinals.

Towards to 2024-25 season, Elitzur Eito Ashkelon united with A.S. Ironi Ashkelon.

== Honours ==
=== Domestic competitions ===
==== Lower division competitions ====
- National League Cup

Runner up : 2021, 2022

- Liga Artzit (3rd)

Winners: 2018 (South Division)

== Roster ==
Elitzur Eito Ashkelon roster
Players
Coaches

Pos.	No.	Nat.	Name	Ht.	Age
G/F	4	(Israel)	Cornelius, Or	1.98 m (6 ft 6 in)	28 – 26 September 1997
G	5	(United States)	Delaney, Paul	1.88 m (6 ft 2 in)	40 – 30 August 1986
F	6	(Israel)	Netzer, Guy	1.95 m (6 ft 5 in)	26 – 14 August 2000
C	7	(United States) (Israel)	Fischer, D'or	2.11 m (6 ft 11 in)	44 – 12 October 1981
G/F	8	(Israel)	Shamriz, Dudu	1.94 m (6 ft 4 in)	32 – 26 March 1994
F	9	(United States)	Reid, Arizona	1.96 m (6 ft 5 in)	40 – 11 March 1986
PF	10	(Israel)	Sapir, Alon (C)	2.01 m (6 ft 7 in)	32 – 26 March 1994
PG	11	(Israel)	Naimy, Yuval	1.88 m (6 ft 2 in)	41 – 31 August 1985
PG	12	(Israel)	Druker, Alon	1.80 m (5 ft 11 in)	25 – 27 September 2000
C	13	(Israel)	Haim, Yuval	2.04 m (6 ft 8 in)	27 – 1 June 1999
F	14	(Israel)	Haddad, Eliran	1.98 m (6 ft 6 in)	27 – 16 February 1999
PG	24	(Israel)	Siboni, Yonatan	1.82 m (6 ft 0 in)	30 – 18 February 1996
C	—	(Israel) (United States)	Rothbart, Robert (injured)	2.17 m (7 ft 1 in)	40 – 16 June 1986
PG	—	(Israel)	Navon, Ariel	1.80 m (5 ft 11 in)	29 – 21 March 1997

Head coach

- (Israel) Roy Hagay

Assistant coach(es)

- (Israel) Maori Sela

Legend

- (C) Team captain
- Injured

- Roster
Updated: February 14, 2020
