= Maccabi Ashdod B.C. =

Maccabi Ashdod Gederot
- Leagues: Israeli Basketball Premier League
- Founded: 1961; 65 years ago
- History: Maccabi Ashdod (1961–present)
- Arena: HaKiriya Arena
- Capacity: 2,200
- Location: Ashdod, Israel
- Team colors: Yellow, Blue
- CEO: Shlomi Ben Mayor
- President: Armaund Asulin
- Team manager: Aaron Freed
- Head coach: Dan Katzir
Home	Away

Maccabi Ashdod B.C. (Hebrew: מכבי אשדוד) is a professional basketball team based in the port city of Ashdod, Israel. The team competes in the Israeli Basketball Premier League, the top tier of Israeli basketball, and plays its home games at the 2,200-seat HaKiriya Arena.

Founded in 1961 with the help of former Maccabi Cairo players who had immigrated to Israel, the club climbed through the lower divisions before making its Israeli Basketball Premier League debut in the 2010–11 season. During its initial decade in the top flight, Ashdod finished as runners-up in the Israeli Championship (2011–12), the Israeli League Cup (2012–13), and the Israeli State Cup (2015–16). Following relegation in 2020 and a spell in the third-tier Liga Artzit, Ashdod earned back-to-back promotions—culminating in winning the 2025–26 Liga Leumit championship—to return to the Israeli Basketball Premier League for the 2026–27 season.

== History ==
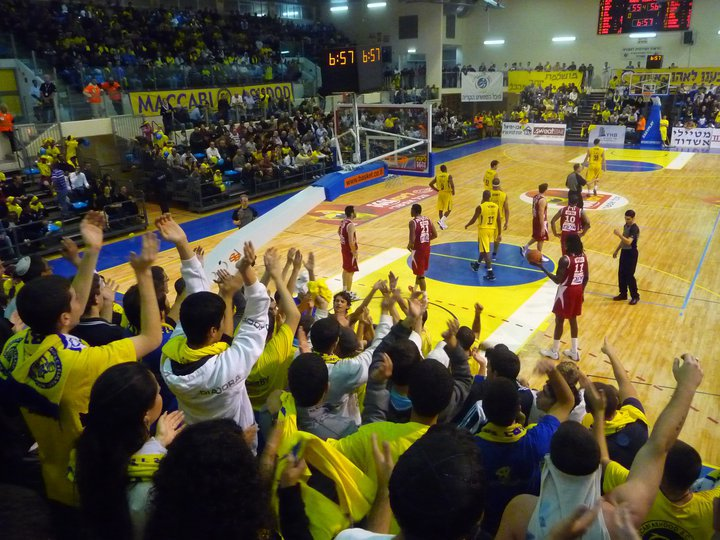
Home game in the HaKiriya Arena (2010)

The team was founded in 1961 by the Maccabi Ashdod Sports Association, with the help of former Maccabi Cairo players who had immigrated to Israel and played on outdoor courts during the team's early years. After gaining promotion to the second-tier Liga Leumit for the 1998–99 season, Ashdod earned promotion to the top-tier Israeli Basketball Premier League in 2010.

In its debut Israeli Basketball Premier League campaign in 2010–11, Ashdod finished sixth in the regular season, reached the playoff quarterfinals, and advanced to the Israeli State Cup semifinals, falling to Maccabi Tel Aviv. The following season (2011–12), Ashdod reached the Israeli Basketball Premier League championship final, losing 83–63 to Maccabi Tel Aviv. On October 6, 2012, the club also reached the Israeli League Cup final, losing 75–65 to Maccabi Tel Aviv.

Ashdod reached the Israeli State Cup final in 2015–16, finishing as runners-up, and posted a fourth-place regular-season finish (20–13) in 2017–18 before losing to Hapoel Tel Aviv in the quarterfinals. After finishing last (5–24) in the 2019–20 season, the club was relegated to Liga Leumit, and later dropped to the third-tier Liga Artzit in 2022. Ashdod climbed back to the top flight via back-to-back promotions: winning promotion from Liga Artzit in 2025, then defeating Ironi Nahariya 3–1 in the Liga Leumit finals on June 11, 2026, to return to the Israeli Basketball Premier League for the 2026–27 season.

== Honors ==
- Israeli Championship
  - Runners-up (1): 2011–12
- Israeli State Cup
  - Runners-up (1): 2015–16
- Israeli League Cup
  - Runners-up (1): 2012–13
- Liga Leumit (2nd tier)
  - Champions (1): 2025–26
- Liga Artzit (3rd tier)
  - South Division Champions (2): 1997–98, 2024–25

== Players ==
=== Current roster ===
Note: Flags indicate national team eligibility at FIBA-sanctioned events. Players may hold other non-FIBA nationalities not displayed.

Maccabi Ashdod roster
Players
Coaches

Pos.	No.	Nat.	Name	Ht.	Age
F	1	(United States)	McDuffie, Markis	2.03 m (6 ft 8 in)	29 – 6 September 1997
G	3	(United States)	Turner, Robert	1.91 m (6 ft 3 in)	33 – 8 April 1993
G/F	4	(Israel)	Shalmon, Shahar	1.90 m (6 ft 3 in)	23 – 10 September 2003
F/C	5	(United States)	Nicholas, Joirdon	2.06 m (6 ft 9 in)	27 – 29 March 1999
G	6	(Israel)	Paretski, Roy	1.94 m (6 ft 4 in)	24 – 24 July 2002
PG	7	(United States)	Hill, Isaiah	1.83 m (6 ft 0 in)	26 – 23 October 2000
SF	8	(Israel) (United States)	Dawson, Shawn	1.98 m (6 ft 6 in)	32 – 12 December 1993
G	12	(Israel)	Bachar, Opel	1.82 m (6 ft 0 in)	22 – 4 January 2004
C	15	(Israel)	Itach, Tzahi	2.05 m (6 ft 9 in)	25 – 23 May 2001
SF	16	(Israel)	Zano, Ariel	2.02 m (6 ft 8 in)	27 – 23 October 1999
G	18	(Israel)	Ben David, Omer	1.86 m (6 ft 1 in)	25 – 5 July 2001
PF	21	(United States)	Rubit, Augustine	2.03 m (6 ft 8 in)	37 – 14 August 1989
F/C	22	(Nigeria)	Wahab, Qudus	2.11 m (6 ft 11 in)	26 – 30 January 2000
PF	32	(United States)	Callahan-Gold, Ben	2.03 m (6 ft 8 in)	23 – 9 August 2003
G	79	(Israel)	Weissmann, Ziv	1.92 m (6 ft 4 in)	23 – 2 November 2003

Head coach

- (Israel) Dan Katzir

Assistant coach(es)

- (Israel) Nimrod Tishman
- (Israel) Dvir Peretz
- (Israel) Itay Klein

Legend

- (C) Team captain
- Injured

- Roster
Updated: September 30, 2026

=== Depth chart ===
Pos.	Starting 5	Bench 1	Bench 2	Bench 3
C	Augustine Rubit	Qudus Wahab	Tzahi Itach
PF	Markis McDuffie	Ben Callahan-Gold	Joirdon Nicholas
SF	Shawn Dawson	Roy Paretski
SG	Robert Turner	Ziv Weissmann	Shahar Shalmon	Eliott Raphael
PG	Isaiah Hill	Omer Ben David	Opel Bachar	Ilay Lugasi

- The Israeli league rule requires every team to have at least one Israeli on the court at any time.
- There should be at least 7 Israelis and up to 5 foreigners on a 12-man game sheet.

Source: Israeli Basketball Premier League

=== Notable players ===
Note: Flags indicate national team eligibility at FIBA-sanctioned events. Players may hold other non-FIBA nationalities not displayed.

Criteria

To appear in this section a player must have either:

- Set a club record or won an individual award while at the club
- Played at least one official international match for their national team at any time
- Played at least one official NBA match at any time.

- (Israel) Moran Roth 1 season: '01–'02
- (Israel) Moti Daniel 1 season: '01–'02
- (United States) (Israel) Joe Dawson 1 season: '03–'04
- (United States) (Israel) Jeron Roberts 1 season: '04–'05
- (United States) (Puerto Rico) Ramón Clemente 1 season: '09–'10
- (United States) Ramel Bradley 1 season: '10–'11
- (Spain) (Israel) Jan Martín 1 season: '10–'11
- (Israel) Meir Tapiro 2 seasons: '10–'12
- (United States) Josh Duncan 2 seasons: '10–'12
- (United States) Josh Carter 3 seasons: '10–'12, '18–'19
- (United States) (Croatia) Oliver Lafayette 1 season: '11
- (United States) Craig Brackins 1 season: '11
- (United States) (Israel) Alex Tyus 1 season: '11–'12
- (United States) Kenny Gabriel 1 season: '12–'13
- (United States) Diamon Simpson 1 season: '12–'13
- (United States) Mardy Collins 1 season: '12–'13
- (United States) Kenny Hayes 1 season: '13–'14
- (United States) Xavier Silas 1 season: '13–'14
- (United States) Elijah Millsap 1 season: '14
- (United States) James Nunnally 1 season: '14–'15
- (United States) Curtis Kelly 1 season: '14–'15
- (Israel) Avi Ben-Chimol 1 season: '14–'15
- (United States Virgin Islands) (Puerto Rico) Ivan Aska 1 season: '14–'15
- (United States) Diante Garrett 1 season: '15–'16
- (United States) Charles Thomas 1 season: '15–'16
- (United States) Isaiah Swann 1 season: '15–'16
- (Sweden) (Israel) Jonathan Skjöldebrand 1 season: '15–'16
- (United States) (Israel) Jake Cohen 1 season: '16–'17
- (United States) Chase Simon 1 season: '16–'17
- (Israel) Adam Ariel 2 seasons: '16–'18
- (Finland) Gerald Lee 1 season: '17–'18
- (United States) Cameron Long 1 season: '17–'18
- (Jamaica) Sek Henry 1 season: '17–'18
- (Israel) Nimrod Levi 2 seasons: '17–'18, '19
- (Kosovo) Lis Shoshi 1 season: '18–'19
- (Mexico) Paul Stoll 2 seasons: '18–20'
- (United States) Mark Tollefsen 2 seasons: '18–'19, '20–present

== See also ==
- Maccabi Bnot Ashdod
- Maccabi Ironi Ashdod F.C.
