= 2023–24 Israeli Basketball National League =

Israeli Basketball National League
- Season: 2023–24
- Teams: 13

Regular season
- Promoted: Hapoel Gilboa Galil; Elitzur Netanya
- Relegated: Maccabi Haifa; Maccabi Ma'ale Adumim

Finals
- Champions: Hapoel Gilboa Galil

In 2023–24, the Israeli Basketball National League played its 25th season as the second tier since its re-alignment in 2000 and the 70th season of second-tier basketball in Israel.

== Teams ==
The following teams have changed division since the 2022–2023 season.

=== To Liga Leumit ===
Promoted from Liga Artzit

- F.C. Safed (North Division)
- Hapoel Bnei Kafr Qasim (South Division)

Relegated from Premier League

- Hapoel Gilboa Galil

=== From Liga Leumit ===
Promoted to Premier League

- Hapoel Afula
- Maccabi Ironi Ramat Gan

Relegated to Liga Artzit

- Hapoel Hevel Modi'in
- Hapoel Ramat Gan Givatayim

=== Venues and locations ===
League Map

Team	City	Arena	Capacity
A.S. Ramat HaSharon	Ramat HaSharon	Kiryat Yearim Hall	900
Elitzur Eito Ashkelon	Ashkelon	Ashkelon Sports Arena	3,000
Elitzur Ironi Netanya	Netanya	Yeshurun Hall	1,000
Elitzur Shomron	Shomron Regional Council	Leader Sport Center, Ganei Tikva	1,000
Hapoel Gilboa Galil	Gilboa Regional Council	Gan Ner Sports Hall	2,250
Hapoel Bnei Kafr Qasim	Kafr Qasim	Zisman Hall, Ramat Gan	1,500
F.C. Safed	Safed	HaPais Hall Safed	
Ironi Nahariya	Nahariya	Ein Sara Sport Hall	2,500
Ironi Ra'anana	Ra'anana	Metro West	1,668
Maccabi Haifa	Haifa	Bikorim Hall	400
Maccabi Ma'ale Adumim	Ma'ale Adumim	HaPais Hall	400
Maccabi Rehovot	Rehovot	Barzilai Sports-Center	700
Maccabi Rishon LeZion	Rishon LeZion	Beit Maccabi Rishon	2,500

== Regular season ==
=== League table ===
Pos	Team	Pld	W	L	PF	PA	PD	Pts	Qualification or relegation
1	Maccabi Rehovot	24	17	7	2045	1904	+141	41	Advance to playoffs
2	Elitzur Netanya	24	17	7	1983	1915	+68	41	Advance to playoffs
3	Ironi Nahariya	24	15	9	2096	1996	+100	39	Advance to playoffs
4	Hapoel Gilboa Galil	24	13	11	1861	1866	−5	37	Advance to playoffs
5	Maccabi Rishon LeZion	24	13	11	2099	2022	+77	37	Advance to playoffs
6	Ironi Ra'anana	24	12	12	2035	2018	+17	36	Advance to playoffs
7	Elitzur Shomron	24	12	12	2082	2120	−38	36	Advance to playoffs
8	Elitzur Eito Ashkelon	24	12	12	1980	1933	+47	36	Advance to playoffs
9	Hapoel Bnei Kafr Qasim	24	10	14	1944	1996	−52	34	Advance to playouts
10	F.C. Safed	24	10	14	1903	1953	−50	34	Advance to playouts
11	A.S. Ramat HaSharon	24	9	15	1840	1971	−131	33	Advance to playouts
12	Maccabi Ma'ale Adumim	24	9	15	1871	1974	−103	33	Advance to playouts
13	Maccabi Haifa	24	7	17	1987	2058	−71	31	Advance to playouts

=== Rounds 1 to 26 ===
Home \ Away	ARH	EAS	ENE	ESH	HGG	HKQ	FCS	IRN	IRA	MHA	MMA	MRH	MRL
A.S. Ramat HaSharon		76–72	70–86	80–87	70–81	103–83	84–68	90–83	76–82	80–69	96–90	85–82	72–75
Elitzur Eito Ashkelon	93–69		82–79	93–87	90–51	115–70	82–76	81–86	75–88	102–90	92–90	56–72	83–96
Elitzur Ironi Netanya	86–74	75–77		87–90	80–60	70–65	87–78	86–83	100–99	90–85	64–71	90–83	85–78
Elitzur Shomron	84–70	72–83	102–89		76–72	93–90	85–75	106–110	88–80	110–113	69–78	88–93	75–87
Hapoel Gilboa Galil	94–71	66–61	84–92	94–83		63–71	73–71	84–82	71–89	90–88	73–77	75–63	97–85
Hapoel Bnei Kafr Qasim	86–63	74–92	79–90	77–87	78–62		87–89	101–79	78–101	87–67	77–87	79–88	84–80
F.C. Safed	74–57	85–80	82–85	95–104	66–79	86–89		80–74	82–81	90–82	84–77	76–77	82–85
Ironi Nahariya	93–53	104–87	83–89	100–81	85–74	94–103	69–71		79–65	84–83	88–81	88–92	100–95
Ironi Ra'anana	76–72	79–66	85–87	84–90	68–86	88–72	78–91	85–97		99–86	103–78	95–89	92–88
Maccabi Haifa	84–86	95–79	90–53	90–79	69–78	78–86	81–67	77–92	95–79		72–82	98–78	81–86
Maccabi Ma'ale Adumim	66–87	85–69	71–92	92–84	74–88	55–79	65–73	75–77	79–83	89–56		64–100	93–86
Maccabi Rehovot	83–77	78–84	76–65	92–94	85–77	84–76	99–78	78–86	89–77	84–69	102–75		96–89
Maccabi Rishon LeZion	93–79	84–92	68–75	106–79	93–89	92–83	93–84	79–80	104–79	108–89	80–77	69–76	

Legend: Blue = home team win; Red = away team win.
Matches with lighter background shading were decided after overtime.

== Playouts ==
Pos	Team	Pld	W	L	PF	PA	PD	Pts	Qualification or relegation	HKQ	FCS	ARH	MMA	MHA
9	Hapoel Bnei Kafr Qasim	28	12	16	2284	2331	−47	40			92–67		84–87	
10	F.C. Safed	28	11	17	2190	2297	−107	39				72–70		72–105
11	A.S. Ramat HaSharon	28	11	17	2187	2337	−150	39		63–91			103–102	
12	Maccabi Ma'ale Adumim	28	11	17	2225	2329	−104	39	Relegation to Liga Artzit		77–76			88–92
13	Maccabi Haifa	28	10	18	2403	2402	+1	38	Relegation to Liga Artzit	118–73		101–111		

== Playoffs ==
Quarterfinals
1	Maccabi Rehovot	68	83	83	3
8	Elitzur Eito Ashkelon	66	78	76	0
4	Hapoel Gilboa Galil	84	84	93	3
5	Maccabi Rishon LeZion	77	80	86	0
3	Ironi Nahariya	84	90	83	88	3
6	Ironi Ra'anana	91	87	74	79	1
2	Elitzur Netanya	82	81	82	3
7	Elitzur Shomron	72	78	68	0

Semifinals
1	Maccabi Rehovot	69	59	79	72	84	2
4	Hapoel Gilboa Galil	79	64	69	64	90	3
2	Elitzur Netanya	86	97	72	3
3	Ironi Nahariya	72	77	67	0

Finals
2	Elitzur Netanya	85
4	Hapoel Gilboa Galil	90

=== Quarterfinals ===
Team 1	Series	Team 2	Game 1	Game 2	Game 3	Game 4	Game 5
Maccabi Rehovot	3–0	Elitzur Eito Ashkelon	68–66	83–78	83–76	—	—
Hapoel Gilboa Galil	3–0	Maccabi Rishon LeZion	84–77	84–80	93—86	—	—
Ironi Nahariya	3–1	Ironi Ra'anana	84–91	90–87	83–74	88–79	—
Elitzur Netanya	3–0	Elitzur Shomron	82–72	81–78	82–68	—	—

==== Game 1 ====
24 April 2024	Maccabi Rehovot	68–66 (Series: 1–0)	Elitzur Eito Ashkelon	Rehovot
19:00	Scoring by quarter: 12–18, 17–16, 24–16, 15–16
	Pts: Ben David 18; Rebs: David 9 Asts: Ben David 8 PIR: Ben David 34	Boxscore	Pts: Tishman, Eisenhardt 15; Rebs: Tishman, Armstrong, Fucs 7 Asts: Tishman 3 PIR: Eisenhardt 15	Arena: Barzilai Sports-Center

24 April 2024	Hapoel Gilboa Galil	84–77 (Series: 1–0)	Maccabi Rishon LeZion	Gan Ner
19:45	Scoring by quarter: 27–18, 18–15, 20–28, 18–16
	Pts: Hirsh 19; Rebs: Hirsh 12; Asts: Ahroni 8 PIR: Hirsh 27	Boxscore	Pts: Dadon 24; Rebs: Dadon 7 Asts: Gilinski, Deri 5 PIR: Dadon 25	Arena: Gan Ner Sports Hall

24 April 2024	Ironi Nahariya	84–91 (Series: 0–1)	Maccabi Ironi Ra'anana	Nahariya
18:30	Scoring by quarter: 22–15, 17–26, 18–28, 27–22
Sports5	Pts: Chubrevich, Warech 14; Rebs: Chubrevich 12; Asts: Yam 8 PIR: Warech 19	Boxscore	Pts: Ohayon 22; Rebs: Ohayon 12; Asts: Ohayon, Mor 5 PIR: Ohayon 41	Arena: Ein Sara Sport Hall

25 April 2024	Elitzur Netanya	82–72 (Series: 1–0)	Elitzur Shomron	Netanya
19:00	Scoring by quarter: 22–16, 24–22, 24–16, 12–18
	Pts: Gutt 18; Rebs: Sahvit 6 Asts: Gat 8 PIR: Sahvit 21	Boxscore	Pts: Levin 19; Rebs: Levin 8 Asts: Shulman 7 PIR: Levin 22	Arena: Yeshurun Hall

==== Game 2 ====
27 April 2024	Elitzur Eito Ashkelon	78–83 (Series: 0–2)	Maccabi Rehovot	Ashkelon
21:15	Scoring by quarter: 18–21, 20–23, 16–24, 24–15
	Pts: Rosenberg 22; Rebs: Rosenberg 8 Asts: Armstrong 7 PIR: Rosenberg 24	Boxscore	Pts: Ben David 24; Rebs: David 9 Asts: Ben David 6 PIR: Ben David 34	Arena: Ashkelon Sports Arena

27 April 2024	Maccabi Rishon LeZion	80–84 (Series: 0–2)	Hapoel Gilboa Galil	Rishon LeZion
20:00	Scoring by quarter: 23–20, 20–24, 23–19, 14–21
Sports5	Pts: Gilinski, Nesterenko, Deri 16; Rebs: Lugashi, Gilinski 9 Asts: Lugashi 6 PIR: Gilinski 20	Boxscore	Pts: Hirsh 22; Rebs: Netzia 9 Asts: Ahroni 8 PIR: Hirsh 29	Arena: Beit Maccabi Rishon

28 April 2024	Maccabi Ironi Ra'anana	87–90 (Series: 1–1)	Ironi Nahariya	Ra'anana
14:00	Scoring by quarter: 25–24, 19–20, 20–32, 23–14
	Pts: Atias 17; Rebs: Atias 12; Asts: Ohayon 10; PIR: Atias 29	Boxscore	Pts: Reuvan 29; Rebs: Chubrevich 5 Asts: Yam 10; PIR: Chubrevich, Reuvan 26	Arena: Metro West

28 April 2024	Elitzur Shomron	78–81 (Series: 0–2)	Elitzur Netanya	Ganei Tikva
13:30	Scoring by quarter: 20–27, 23–20, 23–16, 12–18
Sports5	Pts: Bakhar 16; Rebs: Flaisher 10; Asts: Shimoni, Shulman 5 PIR: Shimoni 25	Boxscore	Pts: Dolinski 22; Rebs: Shavit 10; Asts: Polag 10; PIR: Polag 23	Arena: Leader Sport Center

==== Game 3 ====
1 May 2024	Maccabi Rehovot	83–76 (Series: 3–0)	Elitzur Eito Ashkelon	Rehovot
19:00	Scoring by quarter: 19–18, 17–20, 22–21, 25–17
	Pts: Ben David 25; Rebs: Tal 11; Asts: Ben David 13; PIR: Ben David 37	Boxscore	Pts: Armstrong 24; Rebs: Fox 12; Asts: Tishman 6 PIR: Armstrong 27	Arena: Barzilai Sports-Center

1 May 2024	Hapoel Gilboa Galil	93–86 (Series: 3–0)	Maccabi Rishon LeZion	Gan Ner
19:45	Scoring by quarter: 24–14, 22–28, 26–20, 21–24
	Pts: Hirsh 25; Rebs: Aldrich 8 Asts: Davidi 7 PIR: Aldrich 29	Boxscore	Pts: Lugashi 18; Rebs: Nekrashevich 6 Asts: Kozahinof 11; PIR: Kozahinof 27	Arena: Gan Ner Sports Hall

2 May 2024	Ironi Nahariya	83–74 (Series: 2–1)	Maccabi Ironi Ra'anana	Nahariya
21:00	Scoring by quarter: 23–2, 20–27, 25–26, 15–19
	Pts: Warech 17; Rebs: Chubrevich 11; Asts: Yam 9 PIR: Warech 25	Boxscore	Pts: Alber 15; Rebs: Mor 11; Asts: Alber 9 PIR: Alber 18	Arena: Ein Sara Sport Hall

3 May 2024	Elitzur Netanya	82–68 (Series: 3–0)	Elitzur Shomron	Netanya
14:00	Scoring by quarter: 18–19, 26–19, 23–12, 15–18
	Pts: Gat 17; Rebs: Isaac, Dolinski 6 Asts: Gat 8 PIR: Gat 25	Boxscore	Pts: Levin 21; Rebs: Flaisher 18; Asts: Shulman 9 PIR: Flaisher 28	Arena: Yeshurun Hall

==== Game 4 ====
6 May 2024	Maccabi Ironi Ra'anana	79–88 (Series: 1–3)	Ironi Nahariya	Ra'anana
20:15	Scoring by quarter: 17–27, 23–17, 22–19, 17–25
	Pts: Mor, Ohayon 23; Rebs: Mor 10; Asts: Ohayon 7 PIR: Ohayon 35	Boxscore	Pts: Yam, Binyamin 19; Rebs: Chubrevich 21; Asts: Yam 6 PIR: Chubrevich 29	Arena: Metro West

=== Semifinals ===
Team 1	Series	Team 2	Game 1	Game 2	Game 3	Game 4	Game 5
Maccabi Rehovot	2–3	Hapoel Gilboa Galil	69–79	59–64	79–69	72–64	84–90
Elitzur Netanya	3–0	Ironi Nahariya	86–72	97–77	72–67	—	—

==== Game 1 ====
8 May 2024	Maccabi Rehovot	69–79 (Series: 0–1)	Hapoel Gilboa Galil	Rehovot
19:30	Scoring by quarter: 14–16, 19–18, 19–22, 17–20
	Pts: Freund, Peled 16; Rebs: Freund 6 Asts: Freund 7 PIR: Freund, David 16	Boxscore	Pts: Hirsh 22; Rebs: Hirsh 11; Asts: Ahroni 7 PIR: Hirsh 30	Arena: Barzilai Sports-Center

16 May 2024	Elitzur Netanya	86–72 (Series: 1–0)	Ironi Nahariya	Netanya
18:30	Scoring by quarter: 23–15, 19–17, 15–17, 29–23
	Pts: Polag 18; Rebs: Gat 7 Asts: Gat 8 PIR: Gat 28	Boxscore	Pts: Yam 17; Rebs: Chubrevich 14; Asts: Yam 7 PIR: Yam 21	Arena: Yeshurun Hall

==== Game 2 ====
15 May 2024	Hapoel Gilboa Galil	64–59 (Series: 2–0)	Maccabi Rehovot	Gan Ner
19:30	Scoring by quarter: 20–15, 13–17, 12–18, 19–9
	Pts: Hirsh 28; Rebs: Hirsh 8 Asts: Ahroni 4 PIR: Hirsh 38	Boxscore	Pts: Tal 11; Rebs: David 10; Asts: David 5 PIR: David 21	Arena: Gan Ner Sports Hall

20 May 2024	Ironi Nahariya	77–97 (Series: 0–2)	Elitzur Netanya	Nahariya
20:00	Scoring by quarter: 20–15, 21–37, 15–23, 21–22
	Pts: Reuvan 20; Rebs: Warech, Chubrevich 8 Asts: Binyamin 5 PIR: Reuvan 17	Boxscore	Pts: Dolinski 20; Rebs: Gat 7 Asts: Gat 7 PIR: Gat 26	Arena: Ein Sara Sport Hall

==== Game 3 ====
19 May 2024	Maccabi Rehovot	79–69 (Series: 1–2)	Hapoel Gilboa Galil	Rehovot
20:00	Scoring by quarter: 15–18, 26–22, 25–17, 13–12
	Pts: Freund, Peled 15; Rebs: Tal, Sharon 9 Asts: Freund 5 PIR: Freund 25	Boxscore	Pts: Ahroni 18; Rebs: Hirsh 9 Asts: Ahroni 5 PIR: Ahroni 25	Arena: Barzilai Sports-Center

23 May 2024	Elitzur Netanya	72–67 (Series: 3–0)	Ironi Nahariya	Netanya
20:00	Scoring by quarter: 11–16, 19–9, 16–26, 26–16
	Pts: Dolinski, Gat 15; Rebs: Dolinski 7 Asts: Gat 5 PIR: Dolinski 17	Boxscore	Pts: Chubrevich 20; Rebs: Chubrevich 9 Asts: Reuvan 7 PIR: Chubrevich 23	Arena: Yeshurun Hall

==== Game 4 ====
22 May 2024	Hapoel Gilboa Galil	64–72 (Series: 2–2)	Maccabi Rehovot	Gan Ner
20:00	Scoring by quarter: 14–27, 11–9, 27–20, 12–16
	Pts: Hirsh 20; Rebs: Hirsh 8 Asts: Ahroni 3 PIR: Hirsh 22	Boxscore	Pts: Freund 27; Rebs: Tal 13; Asts: Peled, Guetta 4 PIR: Freund 36	Arena: Gan Ner Sports Hall

==== Game 5 ====
27 May 2024	Maccabi Rehovot	84–90(OT) (Series: 2–3)	Hapoel Gilboa Galil	Rehovot
19:30	Scoring by quarter: 15–16, 24–21, 17–21, 20–18, Overtime: 8–14
	Pts: Freund 19; Rebs: Tal 11; Asts: David, Hadad 4 PIR: Tal 21	Boxscore	Pts: Ahroni 24; Rebs: Ahroni 8 Asts: Ahroni 8 PIR: Ahroni 29	Arena: Barzilai Sports-Center

=== Final ===
30 May 2024	Elitzur Netanya	85–90	Hapoel Gilboa Galil	Netanya
14:00	Scoring by quarter: 35–28, 20–22, 15–22, 15–18
	Pts: Dolinski 21; Rebs: Dolinski 9 Asts: Gat 4 PIR: Dolinski 21	Boxscore	Pts: Hirsh 23; Rebs: Hirsh 11; Asts: Hirsh 5 PIR: Hirsh 31	Arena: Yeshurun Hall
