= 2021 Israeli Basketball National League Cup =

Basketball tournament

Tournament details
- Country: Israel
- Dates: 22 October – 30 December 2021
- Teams: 15

Final positions
- Champions: Hapoel Afula
- Runners-up: Elitzur Eito Ashkelon
- Semifinalists: Ironi Nahariya; Maccabi Haifa

Tournament statistics
- Matches played: 14

Awards
- MVP: (United States) Vander Blue
- All statistics correct as of 30 December 2021.

The 2021 Israeli Basketball National League Cup was the first edition of the Israeli Basketball National League Cup, organized by the Israel Basketball Association.

On 10 May 2021, the Israel Basketball Association announced a change in the State Cup tournament format. Only the first 8 teams at the end of the first rotation of the Israeli Basketball Premier League will compete in the State Cup and not all the teams participate in the Premier League and the Israeli Basketball National League.

On 11 August, 2021, the Israel Basketball Association held the draw for the tournament. The tournament format consists of one-game elimination match.

== bracket ==
Round of 16; 22–24 October
Maccabi Haifa	77
Hapoel Migdal/Jezreel	62
Hapoel Ramat Gan Givatayim	80
Maccabi Hod HaSharon	66
Hapoel Afula	99
A.S. Ramat HaSharon	95
Maccabi Ironi Ramat Gan	79
Maccabi Ashdod	65
Ironi Ra'anana	82
Elitzur Eito Ashkelon	98
Maccabi Ma'ale Adumim	90
Elitzur Netanya	100
Ironi Nahariya	106
Hapoel Hevel Modi'in	89

Quarterfinals; 5, 9 & 20 November
Maccabi Haifa	92
Hapoel Ramat Gan Givatayim	67
Hapoel Afula	82
Maccabi Ironi Ramat Gan	80
Elitzur Eito Ashkelon	84
Elitzur Kiryat Ata	71
Elitzur Netanya	78
Ironi Nahariya	89

Semifinals; 8-9 December
Maccabi Haifa	80
Hapoel Afula	84
Elitzur Eito Ashkelon	95
Ironi Nahariya	91

Final; 30 December
Hapoel Afula	96
Elitzur Eito Ashkelon	78

== Round of 16 ==
The round of 16 took place on 22-24 October, 2021. Ironi Kiryat Ata automatically advanced to the quarterfinals.

23 October 2021	Maccabi Ma'ale Adumim	90–100	Elitzur Netanya	Jerusalem
20:30	Scoring by quarter: 25–28, 20–32, 23–17, 22–23
	Pts: Orion 23; Rebs: Braxton 11; Asts: Navon 6 PIR: Braxton, Orion 25	Boxscore	Pts: Parsons 19; Rebs: Parsons 12; Asts: Parsons 8 PIR: Parsons 31	Arena: Cosell Center; Attendance: 40

23 October 2021	Maccabi Haifa	77–62	Hapoel Migdal/Jezreel	Haifa
21:00	Scoring by quarter: 21-14, 23-15, 15-20, 18-13
	Pts: Putney 19; Rebs: Koperberg 16; Asts: Kozahinof 6 PIR: Koperberg 30	Boxscore	Pts: Parselany 17; Rebs: Parselany 8 Asts: Asayag 9 PIR: Asayag 19	Arena: Romema Arena; Attendance: 200

22 October 2021	Hapoel Ramat Gan Givatayim	80–66	Maccabi Hod HaSharon	Ramat Gan
14:30	Scoring by quarter: 18-15, 21–19, 21–19, 20–13
	Pts: Combs 16; Rebs: Treadwell 11; Asts: Noyovitch 5 PIR: Treadwell 25	Boxscore	Pts: Dawson 21; Rebs: Dawson 9 Asts: Berkowitz 10; PIR: Dawson 28	Arena: Zisman Hall; Attendance: 100

22 October 2021	Maccabi Ironi Ramat Gan	79–65	Maccabi Ashdod	Ramat Gan
12:00	Scoring by quarter: 17–16, 22–18, 19–16, 21–15
	Pts: Hirsh 22; Rebs: Altit & Trant 6 Asts: Delaney 8 PIR: Hirsh 22	Boxscore	Pts: Cohen 26; Rebs: Aji 12; Asts: Cohen 7 PIR: Cohen 27	Arena: Zisman Hall; Attendance: 50

23 October 2021	Hapoel Afula	99–95	A.S. Ramat HaSharon	Afula
20:30	Scoring by quarter: 31–20, 27–20, 29–27, 12–28
	Pts: Porat 21; Rebs: Porat, Danino 6 Asts: Ben Zvi 6 PIR: Porat 24	Boxscore	Pts: Shimoni, Dadon 18; Rebs: Yam 8 Asts: Capers 7 PIR: Capers 26	Arena: Nir Ha'emak Hall; Attendance: 120

23 October 2021	Ironi Nahariya	106–89	Hapoel Hevel Modi'in	Nahariya
20:30	Scoring by quarter: 26–19, 25–19, 30–22, 25–29
	Pts: Yakov 20; Rebs: Thomas 7 Asts: Uzan 6 PIR: Thomas 24	Boxscore	Pts: Hall, Levi 21; Rebs: Hall 6 Asts: Gat 11; PIR: Levy 27	Arena: Ein Sara Sport Hall; Attendance: 100

24 October 2021	Ironi Ra'anana	81–98	Elitzur Eito Ashkelon	Ra'anana
18:00	Scoring by quarter: 18–19, 25–33, 20–27, 18–19
	Pts: Siggers 16; Rebs: Siggers 7 Asts: Siggers 6 PIR: Siggers 26	Boxscore	Pts: Holder 22; Rebs: Warren 11; Asts: Holder 7 PIR: Warren 32	Arena: Metro West; Attendance: 130

== Quarterfinals ==
9 November 2021	Elitzur Eito Ashkelon	84–71	Elitzur Kiryat Ata	Ashkelon
19:00	Scoring by quarter: 17–27, 25–14, 22–20, 20–10
	Pts: Kadir 18; Rebs: Kadir 17; Asts: Kadir 7 PIR: Kadir 41	Boxscore	Pts: Funderburke, Reuven 15; Rebs: Stevens 8 Asts: Reuven 5 PIR: Lavy 19	Arena: Ashkelon Sports Arena; Attendance: 80

9 November 2021	Maccabi Haifa	92–67	Hapoel Ramat Gan Givatayim	Haifa
19:00	Scoring by quarter: 20–11, 16–15, 29–16, 27–25
	Pts: Putney 16; Rebs: Putney 7 Asts: Smith 5 PIR: Putney 22	Boxscore	Pts: Combs 18; Rebs: Tyomkin, Treadwell 7 Asts: Tyomkin 4 PIR: Tyomkin 17	Arena: Romema Arena; Attendance: 150

5 November 2021	Hapoel Afula	82–80	Maccabi Ironi Ramat Gan	Afula
13:30	Scoring by quarter: 19–21, 23–22, 19–16, 21–21
	Pts: Nazia 19; Rebs: Holyfield 12; Asts: Holyfield 6 PIR: Danino, Holyfield 21	Boxscore	Pts: Amir 23; Rebs: Delaney 6 Asts: Delaney 5 PIR: Amir 24	Arena: Nir Ha'emak Hall; Attendance: 30

20 November 2021	Elitzur Netanya	78–89	Ironi Nahariya	Netanya
20:30	Scoring by quarter: 23–23, 10–21, 13–24, 32–21
	Pts: Borg 21; Rebs: Skeens 9 Asts: Parsons 4 PIR: Skeens 18	Boxscore	Pts: Branch 28; Rebs: Thomas 11; Asts: Ohayon 7 PIR: Branch 34	Arena: Yeshurun Hall; Attendance: 600

== Semifinals ==
8 December 2021	Elitzur Eito Ashkelon	95–91	Ironi Nahariya	Ashkelon
19:30	Scoring by quarter: 21–18, 24–19, 25–31, 25–23
	Pts: Warren 26; Rebs: Warren 7 Asts: Rozenfeld, Lewis 5 PIR: Warren 27	Boxscore	Pts: Ohayon 23; Rebs: Chubrevich 8 Asts: Ohayon 8 PIR: Ohayon 22	Arena: Ashkelon Sports Arena; Attendance: 100

9 December 2021	Maccabi Haifa	80–84	Hapoel Afula	Haifa
21:00	Scoring by quarter: 22–21, 23–28, 19–19, 16–16
	Pts: Koperberg 25; Rebs: Smith & Freund 9 Asts: Koperberg 12; PIR: Koperberg 24	Boxscore	Pts: Porat 16; Rebs: Holyfield 13; Asts: Dotan 6 PIR: Holyfield 21	Arena: Romema Arena; Attendance: 150

== Final ==
30 December 2021	Hapoel Afula	96–78	Elitzur Eito Ashkelon	Afula
19:40	Scoring by quarter: 27–25, 14–17, 28–8, 27–28
	Pts: Blue 31; Rebs: Holyfield 13; Asts: Ben-Zvi 6 PIR: Blue 25	Boxscore	Pts: Warren 21; Rebs: Warren 9 Asts: Holder 4 PIR: Warren 19	Arena: Nir Ha'emak Hall; Attendance: 500

Starters:			Pts	Reb	Ast
SG	8	(United States) Vander Blue	31	8	1
PF	17	(Israel) Tomer Porat	16	2	1
PG	10	(Israel) Guy Dotan	13	4	4
F	14	(Israel) Roey Netzia	11	4	2
C	55	(United States) Michael Holyfield	10	13	0
Reserves:					
PG	6	(Israel) Ziv Ben-Zvi	7	1	6
F	5	(Israel) Anton Shoutvin	6	3	1
PG	12	(Israel) Omer El-Al	2	1	1
G/F	25	(Israel) Eliad Tal	0	0	0
F	32	(Israel) Benny Elazar	0	0	0
F	9	(Israel) Ido Avitan	DNP		
Head coach:
(Israel) Nir Kaplan

H. Afula	E. Ashkelon

H. Afula	Statistics	E. Ashkelon
31/50 (62%)	2 point field goals	16/33 (48%)
8/24 (33%)	3 point field goals	9/29 (31%)
10/15 (66%)	Free throws	19/28 (67%)
40	Rebounds	37
16	Assists	15
4	Steals	7
11	Turnovers	13
0	Blocks	1

Starters:			Pts	Reb	Ast
PF	10	(United States) Storm Warren	21	9	2
G	20	(Israel) Daniel Rosenbaum	13	7	0
SG	23	(United States) J.R. Holder	12	3	4
PG	4	(Israel) Arthur Rozenfeld	5	2	2
G	22	(Israel) Omer Ben David	0	1	2
Reserves:					
G	66	(Israel) D.J. Sharp	12	1	0
F	5	(Israel) Jordan Lewis	8	4	3
G	27	(Israel) Alon Druker	7	5	2
G/F	6	(Israel) Guy Netzer	0	0	0
F	13	(Israel) Shir Moraidi	0	0	0
G	14	(Israel) Idan Galbetg	DNP		
G	9	(Israel) Gal Evers	DNP		
PG	55	(Israel) Or Cohen	DNP		
Head coach:
(Israel) Amit Tamir

2021 National League Cup Winners
Hapoel Afula
1st title
