= 2019–20 Hapoel Jerusalem B.C. season =

Hapoel Jerusalem
2019–20 season
- Chairman: Eyal Chomsky
- Head coach: Oded Kattash
- Guy Harel: Guy Harel
- Arena: Pais Arena
- Israeli Premier League: Scheduled
- State Cup: Scheduled
- Basketball Champions League: Scheduled
- 2019 Israeli Basketball League Cup: Won
- All statistics correct as of 1 July 2019.

The 2019–20 Hapoel Jerusalem B.C. season is the 77th season in the existence of the club. The club will play in the Israeli Premier League. It will also play in the regular season of the Basketball Champions League.

It will be the second season under head coach Oded Kattash, who was appointed in February 2018.

== Players ==
=== Squad information ===
Note: Flags indicate national team eligibility at FIBA-sanctioned events. Players may hold other non-FIBA nationalities not displayed.

Hapoel Jerusalem roster
Players
Coaches

Pos.	No.	Nat.	Name	Ht.	Age
G/F	5	(United States) (Israel)	Rosenbaum, Daniel	1.95 m (6 ft 5 in)	29 – 11 February 1997
PG	6	(Israel)	Blatt, Tamir	1.85 m (6 ft 1 in)	29 – 4 May 1997
G	11	(Israel)	Timor, Bar (C)	1.91 m (6 ft 3 in)	34 – 3 February 1992
SG	14	(United States) (Dominican Republic)	Feldeine, James	1.93 m (6 ft 4 in)	38 – 26 June 1988
F	15	(Israel)	Levi, Nimrod	2.08 m (6 ft 10 in)	31 – 24 March 1995
F/C	17	(Nigeria) (United States)	Braimoh, Suleiman	2.03 m (6 ft 8 in)	36 – 19 October 1989
F/C	20	(Israel)	Zalmanson, Idan	2.06 m (6 ft 9 in)	31 – 18 April 1995
G/F	22	(Israel)	Ringvald, Dvir	1.95 m (6 ft 5 in)	27 – 6 July 1999
PF	35	(United States)	Thomas, TaShawn	2.03 m (6 ft 8 in)	33 – 27 February 1993
G	69	(United States)	Brown, J'Covan	1.88 m (6 ft 2 in)	36 – 14 February 1990
C	33	(United States)	Terry, Emanuel	2.06 m (6 ft 9 in)	30 – 21 August 1996
G	0	(United States)	Mack, Shelvin	1.91 m (6 ft 3 in)	36 – 22 April 1990

Head coach

- (Israel) Oded Kattash

Assistant coach(es)

- (Israel) Jonathan Alon
- (Australia) Liam Flynn

Athletic trainer(s)

- (Italy) Roberto Iezzi

Legend

- (C) Team captain
- Injured

- Roster
Updated: 14 August 2019

=== Depth chart ===
Pos.	Starting 5	Bench 1	Bench 2
C	Suleiman Braimoh	Emanuel Terry	Idan Zalmanson
PF	TaShawn Thomas	Nimrod Levi
SF	James Feldeine	John Holland	Dvir Ringvald
SG	J'Covan Brown	Bar Timor	Daniel Rosenbaum
PG	Shelvin Mack	Tamir Blatt

- The Israeli league rule requires every team to have at least one Israeli on the court at any time.
- There should be at least 7 Israelis and up to 5 foreigners on a 12-men game sheet.

== Transactions ==
=== In ===
No.	Pos.	Nat.	Name	Age	Moving from		Type	Ends	Date	Source
	C	(Nigeria) (United States)	Suleiman Braimoh	29	Hapoel Eilat	(Israel)	Free	2021	11 June 2019	
20	PF/C	(Israel)	Idan Zalmanson	24	Hapoel Eilat	(Israel)	Free	2021	11 June 2019	
	F	(Israel)	Nimrod Levi	24	Maccabi Ashdod	(Israel)	Free	2021		
	G	(United States)	Isaiah Cousins	25	Salt Lake City Stars	(Belgium)	Free	2020	24 July 2019	
	G/F	(United States)	Trent Lockett	28	UNICS	(Russia)	Free	2020	7 August 2019	
	C	(Lithuania)	Mindaugas Kupšas	28	Lietkabelis	(Lithuania)	Free	2020	7 August 2019	
	SG	(Israel)	Dvir Ringvald	20						
	SG	(United States) (Israel)	Daniel Rosenbaum	22						

=== Out ===
No.	Pos.	Nat.	Name	Age	Moving to		Type	Date	Source
24	G/F	(United States)	Trent Lockett	29	Universo Treviso Basket	(Italy)	Released		
49	C	(Lithuania)	Mindaugas Kupšas	29	Filou Oostende	(Belgium)	Released		
2	CG	(United States)	Isaiah Cousins	26	Peristeri	(Greece)	Released		
12	PG	(Israel)	Yogev Ohayon	32	Hapoel Holon	(Israel)	End of contract	7 July 2019	
22	PF	(United States)	Josh Owens	30	Pallacanestro Reggiana	(Italy)	End of contract	10 August 2019	
1	PF	(United States) (Israel)	Amar'e Stoudemire	36	Fujian Sturgeons	(China)	End of contract		
	PF	(Israel)	Lior Eliyahu	33	Maccabi Ashdod	(Israel)	End of contract		
	C	(Israel)	Alex Chubrevich	33	Maccabi Ashdod	(Israel)	End of contract		
	C	(Australia) (South Sudan)	Jo Lual-Acuil	25	Melbourne United	(Australia)	End of contract		
	SF	(United States)	Da'Sean Butler	31	Hapoel Be'er Sheva	(Israel)	End of contract		
	G/F	(United States)	Chris Johnson	29	JL Bourg Basket	(France)	End of contract		
	CG	(United States)	Malcolm Griffin	27	Hapoel Tel Aviv B.C.	(Israel)	End of contract		
