= Eric Alfasi =

Israeli basketball player and coach (1972–2021)

Eric Alfasi אריק אלפסי
Personal information
- Born: July 1, 1972 Netanya, Israel
- Died: September 22, 2021 (aged 49) Tel Aviv, Israel
- Position: Head coach
- Coaching career: 2008–2021

Career history

Coaching
- 2008: Ironi Ashkelon
- 2008–2011: Maccabi Netanya
- 2011–2012: Ironi Ashkelon
- 2013–2014: Maccabi Ashdod
- 2015–2018: Ironi Nahariya
- 2018–2019: Ironi Nahariya
- 2019–2020: Hapoel Eilat
- 2021: Elitzur Ashkelon

Career highlights
- As head coach: Israeli League Coach of the Year (2010)

Eric Alfasi (Hebrew: אריק אלפסי; July 1, 1972 – September 22, 2021) was an Israeli professional basketball coach and a professional basketball player. He was the head coach of Hapoel Eilat of the Israeli Premier League.

== Biography ==
=== As a basketball player ===
In his youth he was a basketball player. He played for the team Maccabi Netanya. He also played a number of seasons in the senior side of the team. He retired in his late 20s.

=== As a coach ===
In 2002 he began to coach the youth team of Maccabi Netanya and in 2008 he made his debut as a senior coach as Ironi Ashkelon appointed him as their head coach.

After an unsuccessful season with Ashkelon he made his return to Netanya, this time coaching the senior local team. In his first season with the team he won the Liga Leumit with a record of 33 wins and only 1 defeat. In his second season with the team he led them to the 2009–10 Israeli Final Four where they lost to Maccabi Tel Aviv and finished 4th. In his third season he led the team to the Israeli Basketball State Cup 2010–11 finals where they again lost to Tel Aviv.

In July 2011 he made his way back to Ironi Ashkelon as he signed a contract for one season. On December 23, 2013, it was announced that he would replace Nati Cohen. After one season he signed on to coach Ironi Nahariya.

On June 21, 2019, Alfasi was named Hapoel Eilat head coach, signing a two-year deal.

== Death ==
Alfasi died after being hospitalized with COVID-19 on September 22, 2021, during the COVID-19 pandemic in Israel. He was 49 years old.

== Honours ==
- Domestic Cup:
  - Runner-up (1): 2010-11
- Liga Leumit:
  - Champion (1): 2008-09
  - Regular season champion (1): 2008-09
- Israeli Basketball Super League Manager of the Month (1):
  - October 2011
