= Eliran Guetta =

Israeli basketball player

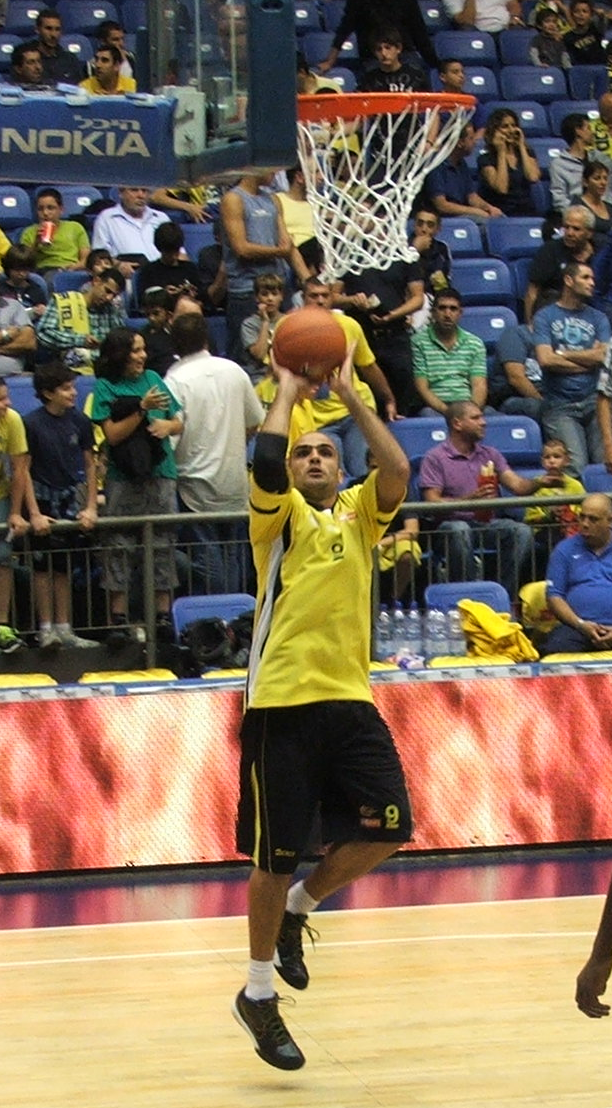

Maccabi Hadera
- Position: Power forward
- League: Liga Artzit

Personal information
- Born: January 23, 1975 (age 51) Hadera, Israel
- Listed height: 6 ft 6 in (1.98 m)

Career information
- College: Tyler Junior College (1995–1997)
- Playing career: 1993–present

Career history
- 1993–1995: Maccabi Netanya
- 1998: Maccabi Netanya
- 1999: Hapoel Beit Eliezer
- 2000–2001: Maccabi Hadera
- 2002: Magnitka-Universitet
- 2003: Hapoel Afula
- 2003–2004: Hapoel Migdal HaEmek
- 2004–2015: Barak Netanya
- 2015–2019: Elitzur Netanya
- 2019–present: Maccabi Hadera

Eliran Guetta (Hebrew: אלירן גואטה; born January 23, 1975) is an Israeli professional basketball player for Maccabi Hadera of the Liga Artzit.

== Honours ==
- Domestic Cup:
  - Runner-up (1): 2010–11
- Liga Leumit:
  - Winner (1): 2008–09
  - Regular season championship (2): 2007–08, 2008–09
- Association Cup:
  - Winner (1): 2009
