= Michael Holyfield =

American basketball player

No. 55 – Taipei Fubon Braves
- Position: Center
- League: P. League+

Personal information
- Born: November 18, 1992 (age 33) Albuquerque, New Mexico, U.S.
- Listed height: 6 ft 11 in (2.11 m)
- Listed weight: 268 lb (122 kg)

Career information
- High school: Manzano (Albuquerque, New Mexico)
- College: Sam Houston State (2011–2015)
- NBA draft: 2015: undrafted
- Playing career: 2015–present

Career history
- 2015–2016: Iowa Energy
- 2016: Los Angeles D-Fenders
- 2016–2017: Illawarra Hawks
- 2017: Beijing Eastern Buck
- 2017–2018: South Bay Lakers
- 2018: Hunan Jinjian Rice Industry
- 2018: Pauian
- 2019: Hong Kong Eastern
- 2019: Beijing Buck
- 2019–2020: Hong Kong Eastern
- 2021: Ionikos Nikaias
- 2021–2022: Hapoel Afula
- 2022: Tycoon
- 2022–2023: Hapoel Hevel Modi'in
- 2023: Changsha Wantian Yongsheng
- 2023–2025: Hsinchu Toplus Lioneers
- 2025: Maccabi Ra'anana
- 2025: Ironi Nahariya
- 2025–2026: Shandong Honey Badger
- 2026–present: Taipei Fubon Braves

Career highlights
- Israeli National League Cup winner (2021); Third-team All-Southland (2015); Southland Defensive Player of the Year (2015); Southland All-Defensive Team (2015)
- Stats at Basketball Reference

Michael Kevin Holyfield (born November 18, 1992) is an American professional basketball player for the Taipei Fubon Braves of the P. League+. He played college basketball at Sam Houston State.

== High school career ==
Holyfield attended Manzano High School in Albuquerque, New Mexico. As a junior in 2009–10, he averaged 12.2 points and 10.3 rebounds per game, and helped the Monarchs win the district championship. He started every game as a junior on team with seven seniors, earning second-team All-District honors. As a senior in 2010–11, he led the Monarchs to a 22–9 record, a No. 4 state ranking and the Class AAAAA state finals. He subsequently earned All-State, All-District and All-Metro selection, and was named the district's Defensive Player of the Year.

== College career ==
Holyfield played four seasons of college basketball for Sam Houston State University. He had a minor role over his first two seasons, coming off the bench for much of his freshman and sophomore campaigns and averaging just 15 minutes per game. As a junior in 2013–14, he increased his numbers in every statistical category, averaging 6.5 points, 6.7 rebounds and 1.7 blocks in 17.6 minutes per game, while starting all 35 contests. His 61 blocks was the fourth highest season total at SHSU. He scored in double figures in seven games, including a season-high 20 points against Northwestern State.

As a senior in 2014–15, Holyfield set the school's single-season blocks record with 86 and subsequently earned Southland Conference Defensive Player of the Year honors. He also earned third-team All-Southland Conference honors after averaging 8.5 points, 8.1 rebounds and 2.5 blocks in 17.9 minutes per game, as he started in 34 of 35 games.

Holyfield completed his career as Sam Houston's fourth all-time leader in blocked shots (105) and fifth all-time in rebounds (769).

== Professional career ==
=== NBA Summer League and preseason ===
After going undrafted in the 2015 NBA draft, Holyfield joined the Memphis Grizzlies for the 2015 Orlando Summer League. He helped the Grizzlies win the Orlando Summer League title, and over five games for the team, he averaged 6.4 points and 4.2 rebounds in 14.3 minutes per game. He later joined the Boston Celtics for the Las Vegas Summer League, where he appeared in one game. On September 28, 2015, he signed with the Grizzlies, but was later waived by the team on October 7 after appearing in one preseason game.

=== NBA D-League ===
On October 31, 2015, Holyfield was acquired by the Iowa Energy of the NBA Development League as an affiliate player of the Grizzlies. He appeared in 22 games for Iowa in 2015–16 before being traded to the Los Angeles D-Fenders on January 29, 2016. In the D-Fenders' regular season finale on April 2, Holyfield had a season-best game with 19 points and 15 rebounds in a 128–121 loss to the Rio Grande Valley Vipers. He helped the D-Fenders reach the 2016 D-League Finals, where they were defeated 2–1 by the Sioux Falls Skyforce. In 24 games for the D-Fenders, he averaged 4.1 points and 3.8 rebounds per game.

=== Illawarra Hawks ===
On August 11, 2016, Holyfield signed with the Illawarra Hawks for the 2016–17 NBL season. He made his debut for the Hawks in their season opener on October 7, 2016, recording 14 points, six rebounds and two blocks off the bench in a 122–88 win over the Adelaide 36ers. Holyfield appeared in all 34 games for the Hawks in 2016–17, averaging 4.1 points and 4.0 rebounds per game.

=== China ===
In June 2018, Holyfield signed with Hunan Jinjian Rice Industry of the Chinese NBL.

Zhejiang Lions signed Holyfield in April 2020. As the 2020 CBA season was still halted due to the COVID-19 at the time, he discontinued the contract and left the team shortly after.

=== Greece ===
Holyfield spent the latter half of the 2020–2021 season with Greek club Ionikos Nikaias.

=== Israel ===
In 2021, Holyfield signed with the Israeli basketball team, Hapoel Afula. He recorded 11 points and 12 rebounds in his debut against the Elitzur Ashkelon.

=== Taiwan ===
On August 21, 2024, Holyfield re-signed with the Hsinchu Toplus Lioneers of the Taiwan Professional Basketball League (TPBL). On March 13, 2025, Hsinchu Toplus Lioneers terminated the contract relationship with Holyfield.

== Career statistics ==
=== Professional ===
Legend
GP	Games played	MPG	Minutes per game	FG%	Field goal percentage
3P%	3-point field goal percentage	FT%	Free throw percentage	RPG	Rebounds per game
APG	Assists per game	SPG	Steals per game	BPG	Blocks per game
PPG	Points per game	**Bold**	Career high		Led the league

Year	Team	League	GP	MPG	FG%	3P%	FT%	RPG	APG	SPG	BPG	PPG
2016–17	Illawarra Hawks	NBL-Australia	34	11.0	.557	**1.000**	**.630**	4.0	.3	.2	.5	4.1
2016–17	Beijing Eastern Buck	NBL-China	24	**43.4**	.644	.333	.540	**23.6**	1.0	1.0	2.2	**27.2**
2017–18	Hunan Jinjian Rice Industry	NBL-China	**35**	36.6	**.651**	.000	.541	17.7	1.0	.8	1.4	18.0
2018–19	Tauoyuan Pauian	Taiwan League	8	21.5	.574	.000	.575	10.8	**1.1**	.4	1.0	11.6
2018–19	Beijing Buck	NBL-China	21	42.4	.621	.333	.573	21.9	**1.1**	**1.5**	1.7	24.8
2018–19	Hong Kong Eastern Long Lions	ASEAN League	10	30.9	.600	.000	.569	16.4	.6	.5	**2.9**	15.5
2019–20	Hong Kong Eastern Long Lions	ASEAN League	10	29.2	.571	.000	.500	14.6	.3	.6	2.0	12.7
Career		All Leagues	142	30.7	.626	.250	.557	15.3	.8	.7	1.5	16.3
