= Beijing Bucks =

- League: National Basketball League
- Affiliation: CITIC Guoan Group

The Beijing Bucks are a Chinese professional men's basketball club based in Beijing, playing in the National Basketball League (China) (NBL). Since 2018 the team has been owned by the CITIC Guoan Group.

== Current roster ==
2018 Beijing Eastern Bucks roster
Players
Coaches

Pos.	No.	Nat.	Name	Ht.	Wt.
G	1	(Chinese Taipei)	Cheng Wei	1.80 m (5 ft 11 in)	84 kg (185 lb)
F	3	(China)	Zhang Shuai	1.95 m (6 ft 5 in)	85 kg (187 lb)
F	5	(China)	Chen Zexu	1.92 m (6 ft 4 in)	85 kg (187 lb)
F	6	(China)	Gao Jiawei	2.00 m (6 ft 7 in)	89 kg (196 lb)
F	8	(China)	Zhao Baiyang	2.00 m (6 ft 7 in)	100 kg (220 lb)
F	9	(China)	Li Ziming	1.95 m (6 ft 5 in)	95 kg (209 lb)
F	12	(China)	Wang Qipeng	2.00 m (6 ft 7 in)	90 kg (198 lb)
G	24	(United States)	Marquis Weddle	1.85 m (6 ft 1 in)	82 kg (181 lb)
F	29	(China)	Zhang Junxiong	2.03 m (6 ft 8 in)	95 kg (209 lb)
C	31	(China)	Rapkatjan Tursunjan	2.01 m (6 ft 7 in)	82 kg (181 lb)
F	35	(United States)	Darnell Harris	2.03 m (6 ft 8 in)	100 kg (220 lb)
F	37	(United States)	Devonte Upson	2.06 m (6 ft 9 in)	102 kg (225 lb)
C	99	(United States)	Michael Holyfield	2.10 m (6 ft 11 in)	110 kg (243 lb)

Head coach

- (China) Wei Mingliang

Assistant coach(es)

- (United States) Jamaal Benjamin

Legend

- (C) Team captain
- Injured

== Notable players ==
- Devonte Upson (born 1993)
