= Gabe DeVoe =

American basketball player (born 1995)

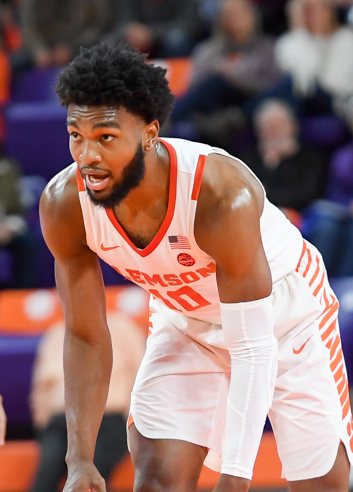
- DeVoe with Clemson in 2017

No. 10 – Elitzur Netanya
- Position: Shooting guard
- League: Liga Leumit

Personal information
- Born: December 16, 1995 (age 30) Shelby, North Carolina, U.S.
- Listed height: 6 ft 3 in (1.91 m)
- Listed weight: 207 lb (94 kg)

Career information
- High school: Shelby (Shelby, North Carolina)
- College: Clemson (2014–2018)
- NBA draft: 2018: undrafted
- Playing career: 2018–present

Career history
- 2018–2019: Zielona Góra
- 2019–2020: Dzūkija Alytus
- 2020–2021: Budivelnyk
- 2021–2022: Unione Cestistica Casalpusterlengo
- 2022–2023: Fos Provence Basket
- 2023: Start Lublin
- 2024–2026: Benedetto Cento
- 2026: Maccabi Rishon LeZion
- 2026–present: Elitzur Netanya

Career highlights
- First-team Parade All-American (2014)

Gabe DeVoe (born December 16, 1995) is an American professional basketball player for Elitzur Netanya of the Israeli Liga Leumit. He played college basketball for Clemson.

== High school career ==
DeVoe decided to pursue basketball as his only sport in ninth grade and pursued a practice regimen that saw him wake up at 5AM and shoot and do conditioning drills at the local YMCA and Holly Oak Park located in Shelby, North Carolina. He attended Shelby High School in North Carolina where he became a star. As a senior, DeVoe averaged 34 points per game. He set school records for career points (2,072) and 3-pointers (218). DeVoe was honored as the Associated Press and Charlotte Observer Player of the Year in 2014. Considered a three-star recruit, DeVoe committed to Clemson. Despite growing up a North Carolina fan, leading the state in scoring, and being the class president, the Tar Heels did not offer him a scholarship, and neither did Duke.

== College career ==
At Clemson, DeVoe played sparingly in the beginning, averaging 2.3 points per game as a freshman. He increased his scoring average to 5.3 points per game as a sophomore. He became a full-time starter as a junior and posted 7.1 points per game. In his senior season, DeVoe averaged 14.2 points per game, shooting 39.6 percent from behind the arc and hitting a career-high 86 3-pointers. He had to assume a larger role on the team after teammate Donte Grantham tore his ACL in January 2018. DeVoe was named player of the week in the Atlantic Coast Conference on February 5, after averaging averaged 20.5 points, 4.0 rebounds and 2.5 assists per game and shooting 60.9 percent in two wins against North Carolina and Wake Forest. He became the first Clemson player since Terrence Oglesby in 2008 to hit at least five three-pointers in consecutive games. DeVoe's best performances came in the NCAA Tournament however, scoring 22 points in the first two matches. In the Sweet 16, he contributed a career-high 31 points in a loss to Kansas. DeVoe averaged 17.1 points per game in the team's last 16 games. He graduated from Clemson's business school with a degree in marketing in May 2018.

== Professional career ==
DeVoe worked out for the Los Angeles Lakers in preparation for the 2018 NBA draft. After going unselected in the draft, DeVoe joined the Charlotte Hornets for the 2018 NBA Summer league. In September 2018, DeVoe signed a deal with Polish basketball team Basket Zielona Góra.

On August 13, 2019, he has signed with Dzūkija Alytus of the Lithuanian Basketball League. DeVoe averaged 13.0 points, 4.1 rebounds, 1.9 assists and 1.1 steals per game.

On October 12, 2020, he signed with Budivelnyk of the Ukrainian Basketball Super League. DeVoe averaged 13 points, 4 rebounds and 2.4 assist per game.

On August 2, 2021, he signed with Unione Cestistica Casalpusterlengo of the Serie A2 Basket.

On June 2, 2022, he has signed with Fos Provence Basket of the LNB Pro A.

On January 3, 2023, he signed with Polski Cukier Start Lublin of the Polish Basketball League (PLK).

On July 9, 2023, he signed with Tezenis Verona of the Lega Basket Serie A (LBA).

On April 24, 2026, he signed with Elitzur Netanya of the Israeli Liga Leumit.
