= Darnell Harris (basketball, born 1992) =

American basketball player and coach

Wake Forest Demon Deacons
- Title: Assistant Coach
- League: Atlantic Coast Conference

Personal information
- Born: February 2, 1992 (age 34) Milwaukee, Wisconsin, U.S.
- Listed height: 6 ft 8 in (2.03 m)
- Listed weight: 220 lb (100 kg)

Career information
- High school: Alexander Hamilton (Milwaukee, Wisconsin); Christian Life Center (Houston, Texas); La Jolla Prep (San Diego, California)
- College: Wisconsin–Whitewater (2012–2013); Northwest Florida State (2013–2014); Middle Tennessee (2014–2016)
- NBA draft: 2016: undrafted
- Playing career: 2016–2020
- Position: Power forward
- Coaching career: 2025–present

Career history

Playing
- 2016–2017: Spirou Charleroi
- 2017–2018: Liège Basket
- 2018: Beijing Eastern Bucks
- 2018–2019: Panionios
- 2019–2020: Larisa
- 2020: AEK Larnaca

Coaching
- 2025–present: Wake Forest (assistant)

Darnell Harris (born February 2, 1992) is an American basketball coach and former player. He played college basketball at the University of Wisconsin-Whitewater, Northwest Florida State College, and Middle Tennessee State University.

== Early life and high school ==
Harris was born and grew up in Milwaukee, Wisconsin and originally attended Alexander Hamilton High School. He transferred to Christian Life Center Academy in Houston, Texas before his senior year and completed a fifth year at La Jolla Prep in San Diego, California. Harris initially committed to play basketball at Cleveland State, but an investigation into La Jolla Prep's curriculum did not meet the NCAA's academic requirements and Harris was therefore ineligible to play the next season at the Division I level.

== College career ==
=== Wisconsin-Whitewater ===
Harris began his college career playing for NCAA Division III Wisconsin–Whitewater Warhawks, opting to play close to home on at lower level than at a junior college. As a freshman, he averaged 11.4 points and a team-leading six rebounds per game. He opted to transfer to Northwest Florida State College following the end of the season in order to attempt to play basketball at a higher level.

=== Northwest Florida ===
Harris spent his sophomore year playing for Northwest Florida State College and committed to play basketball at Middle Tennessee State University before the start of the junior college season. In his only season for the Raiders, Harris averaged 12 points and 5.7 rebounds per game while shooting 53.6 percent from the field and 36.1 percent of three-point attempts in 27 games (18 starts).

=== Middle Tennessee ===
In his first season at Middle Tennessee, Harris played in all 36 of the Blue Raiders games (13 starts) and averaged 6.7 points per game. He averaged 11.7 points and four rebounds per game as a starter during his senior year and scored 15 points in the Blue Raiders' upset of 2nd-seeded Michigan State in the 2016 NCAA tournament.

== Professional career ==
=== Spirou Charleroi ===
Harris signed a one-year contract with Spirou Charleroi of the Belgian Pro Basketball League (PBL) on June 28, 2016. In his first professional season, Harris averaged 4.7 points and 2.2 rebounds in 42 PBL games, 5.2 points and 1.8 rebounds in 13 Basketball Champions League games, and 5.5 points and 2.0 rebounds over two FIBA Europe Cup contests.

=== Liège ===
Harris stayed in Belgium for a second season after signing with Liège Basket on June 11, 2017. He averaged 9.1 points and 4.4 rebounds per game in 35 games.

=== Beijing Bucks ===
Harris played for Beijing Eastern Bucks of the Chinese National Basketball League (NBL), averaging 27.5 points, 7.3 rebounds, 2.9 assists and 1.1 steals in 16 league games.

=== Panionios ===
Harris signed with Panionios of the Greek Basket League (GBL) on September 7, 2018. Harris played in 23 GBL games, starting 21, and averaged 10.1 points and 4.6 rebounds per game with Panionios.

=== Sagesse ===
Following the end of the Greek League season, Harris signed with CS Sagesse of the Lebanese Basketball League on June 1, 2019. Harris left Sagesse before appearing in a game with the team.

=== Larisa ===
On October 7. 2019, Harris returned to Greece and signed with Larisa (under his Panionios coach, Vassilis Fragkias), and replacing Justin Baker.

== Coaching career ==
Harris joined the Wake Forest Demon Deacons men's basketball program in 2023 as Assistant Director of Player Relations. In 2025 he became an assistant coach under Steve Forbes.
