= 2018–19 Israeli Basketball State Cup =

Basketball tournament

Israeli Basketball State Cup
- Season: 2018–19
- Dates: 23 December 2018 – 14 February 2019
- Games played: 12
- Teams: 13

Finals
- Champions: Hapoel Jerusalem (5th title)
- Runners-up: Maccabi Rishon LeZion
- Finals MVP: (United States) TaShawn Thomas

The 2018–19 Israeli Basketball State Cup was the 59th edition of the Israeli Basketball State Cup, organized by the Israel Basketball Association.

The Final Four of the tournament was held from February 11–14 in the Pais Arena in Jerusalem.

On February 14, 2019, Hapoel Jerusalem won its fifth State Cup title after an 82–67 win over Maccabi Rishon LeZion in the Final. TaShawn Thomas was named the Final MVP.

== Bracket ==
First Round; 23–25 December
Maccabi Rishon LeZion	98
Ironi Nahariya	66
Hapoel Be'er Sheva	93
Ironi Nes Ziona	83
Maccabi Ashdod	73
Hapoel Tel Aviv	101
Maccabi Haifa	58
Hapoel Gilboa Galil	87
Bnei Herzliya	88
Hapoel Eilat	97

Quarterfinals; 29–30 December
Maccabi Rishon LeZion	88
Maccabi Tel Aviv	77
Hapoel Be'er Sheva	94
Hapoel Tel Aviv	95
Hapoel Gilboa Galil	83
Hapoel Jerusalem	89
Hapoel Eilat	91
Hapoel Holon	97

Semifinals; 11 February
Maccabi Rishon LeZion	86
Hapoel Tel Aviv	70
Hapoel Jerusalem	91
Hapoel Holon	77

Final; 14 February
Maccabi Rishon LeZion	67
Hapoel Jerusalem	82

== First round ==
Ten teams participated in the First Round. Maccabi Tel Aviv, Hapoel Holon and Hapoel Jerusalem were pre-qualified for the quarterfinals and didn't play in the First Round.

On October 15, 2018, The Israel Basketball Association (IBBA) disqualified all the teams from the Liga Leumit, aside from Maccabi Haifa, due to the league's lockout.

=== B. Herzliya vs. H. Eilat ===
December 23, 2018	Bnei Herzliya	88–97	Hapoel Eilat	Herzliya
20:10	Scoring by quarter: 20–19, 21–29, 21–30, 26–20
Sport 5	Pts: Leumi 18; Rebs: Armstrong & Adrien 7 Asts: Michael Dixon 4 PIR: Armstrong 19	Box Score	Pts: Braimoh 24; Rebs: Tokoto 9 Asts: Bryant 7 PIR: Braimoh 26	Arena: HaYovel

=== H. Be'er Sheva vs. I. Nes Ziona ===
December 23, 2018	Hapoel Be'er Sheva	93–83	Ironi Nes Ziona	Be'er Sheva
20:20	Scoring by quarter: 17–24, 34–19, 26–20, 16–20
Sport 5	Pts: Swing 31; Rebs: Donaldson & Rothbart 9 Asts: Braun 8 PIR: Swing 32	Box Score	Pts: Dunne 16; Rebs: Dunne 10; Asts: Dowe 11; PIR: Dunne 22	Arena: Conch

=== M. Haifa vs. H. Gilboa Galil ===
December 23, 2018	Maccabi Haifa	58–87	Hapoel Gilboa Galil	Haifa
20:30	Scoring by quarter: 13–14, 15–31, 12–23, 18–19
Sport 5	Pts: Sorkin 14; Rebs: Koperberg 9 Asts: three players 3 PIR: Sorkin 19	Box Score	Pts: Whittington 18; Rebs: Kelly 8 Asts: Miller 5 PIR: Whittington 23	Arena: Romema

=== M. Rishon LeZion vs. I. Nahariya ===
December 24, 2018	Maccabi Rishon LeZion	98–66	Ironi Nahariya	Rishon LeZion
20:30	Scoring by quarter: 20–15, 25–15, 30–19, 23–17
Sport 5	Pts: Hamilton 21; Rebs: Segev 9 Asts: Hamilton 9 PIR: Hamilton 31	Box Score	Pts: Nesterenko 14; Rebs: Foulland & Allen 5 Asts: Ziv 7 PIR: Foulland 14	Arena: Beit Maccabi

=== M. Ashdod vs. H. Tel Aviv ===
December 25, 2018	Maccabi Ashdod	73–101	Hapoel Tel Aviv	Ashdod
20:30	Scoring by quarter: 15–28, 14–28, 26–26, 19–18
Sport 5	Pts: Milbourne 18; Rebs: Shoshi 8 Asts: Stoll 7 PIR: Tollefsen & Milbourne 13	Box Score	Pts: Akoon-Purcell 20; Rebs: Aminu 11; Asts: McNeal 6 PIR: Akoon-Purcell 21	Arena: HaKiriya

== Quarterfinals ==
=== H. Eilat vs. H. Holon ===
December 29, 2018	Hapoel Eilat	71–97	Hapoel Holon	Eilat
20:00	Scoring by quarter: 20–21, 16–26, 14–26, 21–24
Sport 5	Pts: Bryant 19; Rebs: Braimoh 10; Asts: Ben-Chimol 7 PIR: Braimoh 26	Box Score	Pts: Jones 19; Rebs: Jones 11; Asts: Cline 5 PIR: Jones 32	Arena: Begin

=== H. Be'er Sheva vs. H. Tel Aviv ===
December 29, 2018	Hapoel Be'er Sheva	94–95(OT)	Hapoel Tel Aviv	Be'er Sheva
20:30	Scoring by quarter: 14–27, 21–17, 20–20, 26–17, Overtime: 13–14
Sport 5	Pts: Swing 26; Rebs: Donaldson 9 Asts: Cohen-Saban 6 PIR: Swing 27	Box Score	Pts: McNeal 30; Rebs: Ginat 13; Asts: Limonad 7 PIR: McNeal 30	Arena: Conch

=== H. Gilboa Galil vs. H. Jerusalem ===
December 30, 2018	Hapoel Gilboa Galil	83–89	Hapoel Jerusalem	Gilboa
19:20	Scoring by quarter: 18–19, 23–29, 24–17, 19–25
Sport 5	Pts: Miller 24; Rebs: Kelly 11; Asts: Whittington & Skverer 4 PIR: Whittington 28	Box Score	Pts: Feldeine 22; Rebs: Thomas & Feldeine 8 Asts: Thomas 5 PIR: Feldeine 23	Arena: Gan Ner

=== M. Rishon LeZion vs. M. Tel Aviv ===
December 30, 2018	Maccabi Rishon LeZion	88–77	Maccabi Tel Aviv	Rishon LeZion
21:15	Scoring by quarter: 20–16, 31–13, 14–22, 23–26
Sport 5	Pts: Koulechov 18; Rebs: Hamilton 7 Asts: Hamilton 5 PIR: Long 24	Box Score	Pts: Wilbekin 17; Rebs: Tyus 11; Asts: Wilbekin 6 PIR: Tyus 18	Arena: Beit Maccabi

== Final four ==
The Final Four of the tournament was held from February 11–14 in the Pais Arena in Jerusalem.

=== Semifinals ===
==== M. Rishon LeZion vs. H. Tel Aviv ====
February 11, 2018	Maccabi Rishon LeZion	86–70	Hapoel Tel Aviv	Jerusalem
18:30	Scoring by quarter: 13–14, 24–24, 24–20, 25–12
Sport 5	Pts: Hamilton 23; Rebs: Simpson 13; Asts: Long 7 PIR: Simpson 28	Box Score; Report	Pts: McNeal 18; Rebs: Howell 7 Asts: Limonad & McNeal 4 PIR: Ginat 19	Arena: Pais Arena; Attendance: 8,000

Starters:			Pts	Reb	Ast
G	1	(United States) Alex Hamilton	23	2	6
G	20	(United States) Cameron Long	17	6	7
G/F	4	(Israel) Egor Koulechov	3	3	0
F/C	23	(United States) Deshawn Stephens	8	6	1
C	9	(Israel) Itay Segev	2	4	2
Reserves:					
C	15	(United States) Diamon Simpson	22	13	1
G/F	11	(Israel) Adam Ariel	8	5	1
F	14	(Israel) Oz Blayzer	3	4	2
G	30	(Israel) Nimrod Tishman	0	0	0
G	3	(Israel) Amit Ebo	0	0	0
G	2	(Israel) Yair Bauman	DNP		
F	6	(Israel) Guy Netzer	DNP		
Head coach:
(Israeli Basketball Association) Guy Goodes

M. Rishon LeZion	H. Tel Aviv

Rishon LeZion	Statistics	Tel Aviv
22/43 (51%)	2 point field goals	15/37 (41%)
7/28 (25%)	3 point field goals	7/27 (26%)
21/30 (70%)	Free throws	19/25 (76%)
47	Rebounds	41
20	Assists	14
9	Steals	12
16	Turnovers	19
3	Blocks	2

Starters:			Pts	Reb	Ast
G	22	(United States) Jerel McNeal	18	4	4
G	14	(Israel) Raviv Limonad	4	4	4
F	5	(Trinidad and Tobago) DeVaughn Akoon-Purcell	8	5	3
PF	41	(Israel) Tomer Ginat	17	6	0
C	97	(Israel) Richard Howell	4	7	1
Reserves:					
G	1	(United States) Jamal Shuler	13	3	1
C	4	(Nigeria) Alade Aminu	6	4	1
F	31	(Israel) Stu Douglass	0	1	0
G	11	(Israel) Yam Madar	0	0	0
F/C	7	(Israel) Daniel Sasson	DNP		
G	15	(Israel) Tzuf Ben-Moshe	DNP		
F	30	(Israel) Guy Aloush	DNP		
Head coach:
(Israeli Basketball Association) Danny Franco

==== H. Jerusalem vs. H. Holon ====
February 11, 2018	Hapoel Jerusalem	91–77	Hapoel Holon	Jerusalem
21:00	Scoring by quarter: 25–20, 23–18, 27–20, 16–19
Sport 5	Pts: Brown 22; Rebs: Thomas 9 Asts: Brown 6 PIR: Brown 26	Box Score; Report	Pts: Walden 15; Rebs: Walden 9 Asts: Reynolds 4 PIR: Walden 15	Arena: Pais Arena; Attendance: 8,000

Starters:			Pts	Reb	Ast
G	12	(Israel) Yogev Ohayon	6	1	3
G	6	(Israel) Tamir Blatt	11	2	1
F	17	(United States) Da'Sean Butler	3	2	0
F/C	35	(United States) TaShawn Thomas	14	9	1
C	22	(United States) Josh Owens	8	5	1
Reserves:					
G	69	(United States) J'Covan Brown	22	7	6
G	14	(Dominican Republic) James Feldeine	21	3	2
G	11	(Israel) Bar Timor	4	1	0
F	8	(Israel) Lior Eliyahu	2	1	1
C	23	(Israel) Alex Chubrevich	DNP		
Head coach:
(Israeli Basketball Association) Oded Kattash

H. Jerusalem	H. Holon

Jerusalem	Statistics	Holon
24/38 (63%)	2 point field goals	19/40 (48%)
9/28 (32%)	3 point field goals	9/29 (31%)
16/24 (67%)	Free throws	12/13 (92%)
35	Rebounds	42
15	Assists	14
10	Steals	7
10	Turnovers	17
7	Blocks	3

Starters:			Pts	Reb	Ast
G	2	(United States) Corey Walden	15	9	2
F	7	(United States) DeQuan Jones	8	3	0
F	10	(Israel) Guy Pnini	13	3	3
F/C	6	(Israel) T. J. Cline	8	7	2
C	21	(Kosovo) Shawn Jones	2	5	0
Reserves:					
G	12	(Israel) Shlomi Harush	11	2	2
F/C	5	(United States) Darion Atkins	10	2	1
F	8	(Israel) Amit Simhon	6	3	0
G	3	(United States) Scottie Reynolds	4	4	4
G	13	(Israel) Roi Huber	DNP		
G	9	(Israel) Guy Palatin	DNP		
G	31	(Israel) Amit Arbeli	DNP		
Head coach:
(Israeli Basketball Association) Dan Shamir

=== Final ===
==== H. Jerusalem vs. M. Rishon LeZion ====
February 14, 2018	Hapoel Jerusalem	82–67	Maccabi Rishon LeZion	Jerusalem
21:00	Scoring by quarter: 23–18, 19–22, 29–8, 11–19
Sport 5	Pts: Brown 19; Rebs: Thomas 10; Asts: Eliyahu 6 PIR: Brown 20	Box Score; Report	Pts: Hamilton 16; Rebs: Simpson 11; Asts: Hamilton 4 PIR: Segev 19	Arena: Pais Arena; Attendance: 11,120

Starters:			Pts	Reb	Ast
G	12	(Israel) Yogev Ohayon	4	5	2
G	6	(Israel) Tamir Blatt	5	2	5
F	17	(United States) Da'Sean Butler	7	2	1
F/C	35	(United States) TaShawn Thomas	15	10	1
C	22	(United States) Josh Owens	2	7	1
Reserves:					
G	69	(United States) J'Covan Brown	19	4	2
G	14	(Dominican Republic) James Feldeine	15	6	2
F	8	(Israel) Lior Eliyahu	8	3	6
G	11	(Israel) Bar Timor	7	2	1
C	23	(Israel) Alex Chubrevich	0	2	0
Head coach:
(Israeli Basketball Association) Oded Kattash

H. Jerusalem	M. Rishon LeZion

Jerusalem	Statistics	Rishon LeZion
18/36 (50%)	2 point field goals	16/48 (33%)
10/33 (30%)	3 point field goals	7/22 (32%)
16/20 (80%)	Free throws	14/26 (54%)
50	Rebounds	45
21	Assists	9
6	Steals	5
12	Turnovers	8
7	Blocks	7

Starters:			Pts	Reb	Ast
G	1	(United States) Alex Hamilton	16	6	4
G	20	(United States) Cameron Long	13	2	1
G/F	4	(Israel) Egor Koulechov	7	6	0
F/C	23	(United States) Deshawn Stephens	13	2	0
C	9	(Israel) Itay Segev	6	10	1
Reserves:					
C	15	(United States) Diamon Simpson	7	11	1
G/F	11	(Israel) Adam Ariel	2	1	1
G	30	(Israel) Nimrod Tishman	2	1	1
F	14	(Israel) Oz Blayzer	1	2	0
G	3	(Israel) Amit Ebo	DNP		
G	2	(Israel) Yair Bauman	DNP		
F	6	(Israel) Guy Netzer	DNP		
Head coach:
(Israeli Basketball Association) Guy Goodes

2019 Israeli State Cup Winners
Hapoel Jerusalem
(5th title)

== See also ==
- 2018–19 Israeli Basketball Premier League
- Liga Leumit
