= 2009–2010 Israeli Final Four =

Basketnall compeyition

The 2009–2010 Israeli Final Four, the fifth Israeli Final Four was held at Yad Eliyahu Arena, Tel Aviv, Israel on 25 and 27 May 2010 to determine the winner of the 2009–2010 Israeli League. The contestants were Maccabi Tel Aviv, the 2008–2009 Israeli League champion and the 2009–2010 Israeli State Cup winner, Hapoel Jerusalem, Gilboa/Galil and Elitzur Maccabi Netanya. Gilboa/Galil won their 2nd Israeli League crown, beating Maccabi Tel Aviv 90–77 in the final.

== Venue ==
The Yad Eliyahu Arena is an indoor sports arena in Tel Aviv, Israel. Opened in 1963 with its seating capacity varying from 5,000 to 11,700, it had hosted the 1971–1972 FIBA European Champions Cup final, the 1993–1994 FIBA European Championship Final Four, the 2003–04 Euroleague Final Four, and all previous Israeli Final Four.

== Results ==
=== Bracket ===
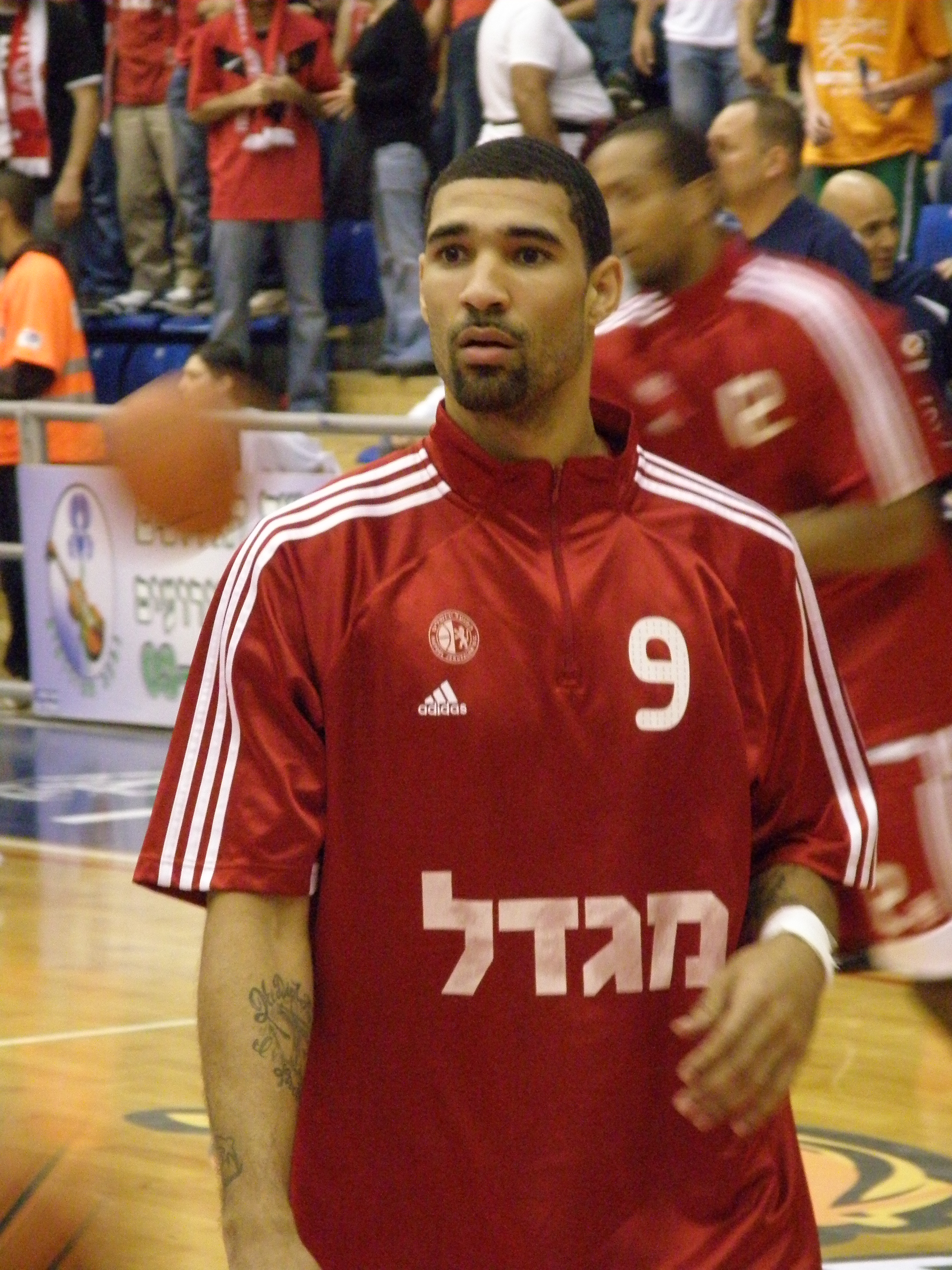
Tre Simmons

Semifinals; 25 May
Hapoel Jerusalem	69
Gilboa/Galil	79
Maccabi Tel Aviv	104
Elitzur Maccabi Netanya	78

Final; 27 May
Gilboa/Galil	90
Maccabi Tel Aviv	77
Third place
Hapoel Jerusalem	95
Elitzur Maccabi Netanya	82

=== Semifinals ===
All times are in Israel Summer Time.

==== Semifinal 1 ====
25 May 2010
18:00

Hapoel Jerusalem	69–79	Gilboa/Galil
Scoring by quarter: 19–20, 22–15, 11–23, 17–21
Pts: Hunter 16; Rebs: Simmons 11; Asts: Ohayon, Neimi 4		Pts: Pargo 13; Rebs: Randle 8 Asts: Mekel 5

Yad Eliyahu Arena, Tel Aviv
Attendance: 10,383

==== Semifinal 2 ====
25 May 2010
20:55

Maccabi Tel Aviv	104–78	Elitzur Maccabi Netanya
Scoring by quarter: 29–14, 31–18, 24–19, 20–27
Pts: Pnini 16; Rebs: Eidson 7 Asts: Perkins 7		Pts: Washam 26; Rebs: Washam 6 Asts: Washam 4

Yad Eliyahu Arena, Tel Aviv
Attendance: 10,383

=== Third-place playoff ===
27 May 2010
18:00

Hapoel Jerusalem	95–82	Elitzur Maccabi Netanya
Scoring by quarter: 17–23, 30–19, 28–14, 20–26
Pts: Neimi 24; Rebs: Thompson 8 Asts: Neimi 8		Pts: Pinnock 29; Rebs: Washam 9 Asts: Washam 5

Yad Eliyahu Arena, Tel Aviv
Attendance: 10,383

=== Final ===
27 May 2010
20:55

Gilboa/Galil	90–77	Maccabi Tel Aviv
Scoring by quarter: 20–21, 22-29, 21-9, 27-18
Pts: Randle 19; Rebs: Pargo 7 Asts: Izraeli 6		Pts: Pnini 18; Rebs: Eidson 9 Asts: Perkins 7

Yad Eliyahu Arena, Tel Aviv
Attendance: 10,383
