= DeVonte Upson =

American basketball player (born 1993)

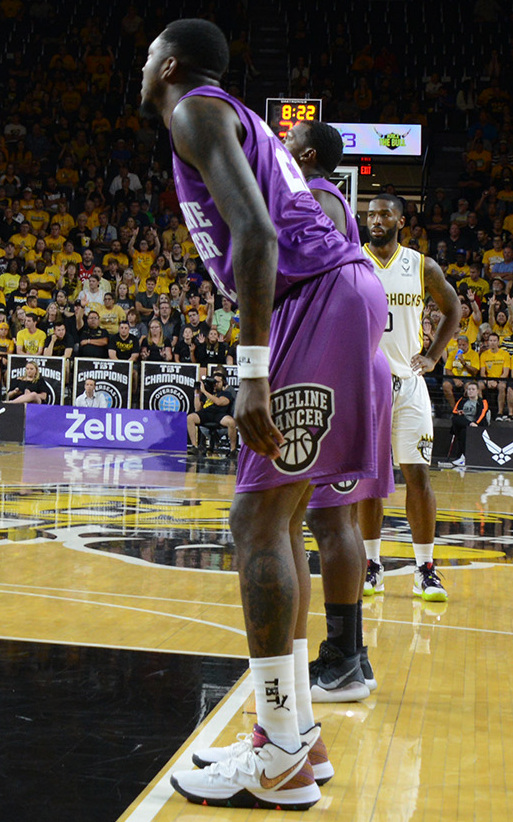
- Upson during The Basketball Tournament 2019

No. 9 – Kolossos Rodou
- Position: Center
- League: Greek Basketball League

Personal information
- Born: March 23, 1993 (age 33) Augusta, Georgia, U.S.
- Listed height: 6 ft 9 in (2.06 m)
- Listed weight: 225 lb (102 kg)

Career information
- High school: Harrison (Colorado Springs, Colorado)
- College: Trinidad State (2011–2013); Southeastern Louisiana (2013–2015)
- NBA draft: 2015: undrafted
- Playing career: 2015–present

Career history
- 2015–2016: Starwings Basel
- 2016–2017: Helsinki Seagulls
- 2017–2018: Rapla KK
- 2018: Beijing Bucks
- 2018–2019: Start Lublin
- 2019: Comunicaciones Mercedes
- 2019–2020: Arka Gdynia
- 2020: SIG Strasbourg
- 2020–2021: Pallacanestro Trieste
- 2021–2022: Merkezefendi
- 2022–2023: Hapoel Haifa
- 2023–2024: Büyükçekmece
- 2024: Trepça
- 2024–2025: PAOK Thessaloniki
- 2025: Astros de Jalisco
- 2025–2026: Jilin Northeast Tigers
- 2026: Karditsa
- 2026–present: Kolossos Rodou BC

Career highlights
- Kosovo Superleague champion (2024); Liga Unike champion (2024); Kosovo Cup (2024)

Zwencyl DeVonte Upson (born March 23, 1993) is an American professional basketball player for Kolossos Rodou of the Greek Basketball League. He plays the center position. He played college basketball for Trinidad State College and Southeastern Louisiana University.

== Early life ==
Upson was born in Augusta, Georgia, to Zwencyl Upson and Lelinda Parksand, and lived in Amarillo, Texas. He is 6 ft 9 in (2.06 m) tall, and weighs 205 lb (93 kg).

He attended Harrison High School ('11) in Colorado Springs, Colorado. Playing basketball for the high school as a senior, Upson averaged 11.4 points, 9.8 rebounds, and 4.4 blocks per game.

== College career ==
In 2011–13, Upson attended and played basketball at Trinidad State College in Trinidad, Colorado. In his freshman season, he averaged 9.0 points, 6.0 rebounds, and 1.5 blocks per game, shooting 61.8% from the field. In his sophomore year, he averaged 10.8 points, 7.3 rebounds, and 1.7 blocks (2nd in NJCAA Region IX) per game.

In 2013–15, he attended and played basketball at Southeastern Louisiana University ('15). In 2013–14, Upson averaged 8.3 points, 6.1 rebounds, and 1.7 blocked shots per game. In 2015, he averaged 10.8 points, 7.4 rebounds, and 1.5 blocks per game and was All-Southland Conference Honorable Mention.

== Professional career ==
In 2015–16, Upson played for Starwings Basket Regio Basel of Switzerland's LNA. He averaged 14.6 points, 9.6 rebounds (3rd in the LNA) and 1.0 blocks (3rd) per game. In 2016–17, he played for Helsinki Seagulls of Finland's Korisliiga. He averaged 19.6 points and 0.9 blocks (5th in the league) per game.

In 2017–18, he played for Rapla BS of Estonia's Korvpalli Meistriliiga. Upson averaged 10.9 points, 7.2 rebounds, and 1.1 blocks (2nd in the league) per game. In June 2018, he was signed by the Beijing Bucks in the Chinese National Basketball League. Playing for them, he averaged 18 points, 14 rebounds, and 2.4 blocks per game.

In 2018–19, Upson played for Polski Cukier Pszczolka Start Lublin of the Polish Basketball League, averaging 9.7 points, 6.4 rebounds (5th in the league), and 1.1 blocks (2nd) per game. In 2019, he played for Comunicaciones Mercedes of Argentina's Liga, averaging 5.8 points, 5.3 rebounds, and 0.9 blocks per game.

In 2019–20, he played for Asseco Arka Gdynia of the Polish Basketball League, averaging 7.6 points, 3.8 rebounds, and 1.0 blocks per game. In 2020, Upson played one game for Strasbourg IG of France's Jeep Elite, before the pandemic ended the season.

In 2020–21, he played for Pallacanestro Trieste 2004 of Italy's Lega Basket Serie A, and averaged 7.1 points, 4.8 rebounds, and 0.4 blocks per game. In 2021–22, he played for Merkezefendi Belediyesi Denizli Basket of Turkey's Basketbol Süper Ligi. He averaged 8.8 points, 6.8 rebounds (9th in the league), and 0.8 blocks (6th) per game, while shooting 68% from the field.

In 2022–23, Upson played for Hapoel Haifa of the Israeli Basketball Premier League.

On the 8 February 2024, Upson signed for Trepça of the Kosovo Superleague.

On August 3, 2024, he joined Greek club PAOK Thesssaloniki.

On November 11, 2025, he joined Jilin Northeast Tigers of the CBA.
