= TaShawn Thomas =

American basketball player (born 1993)

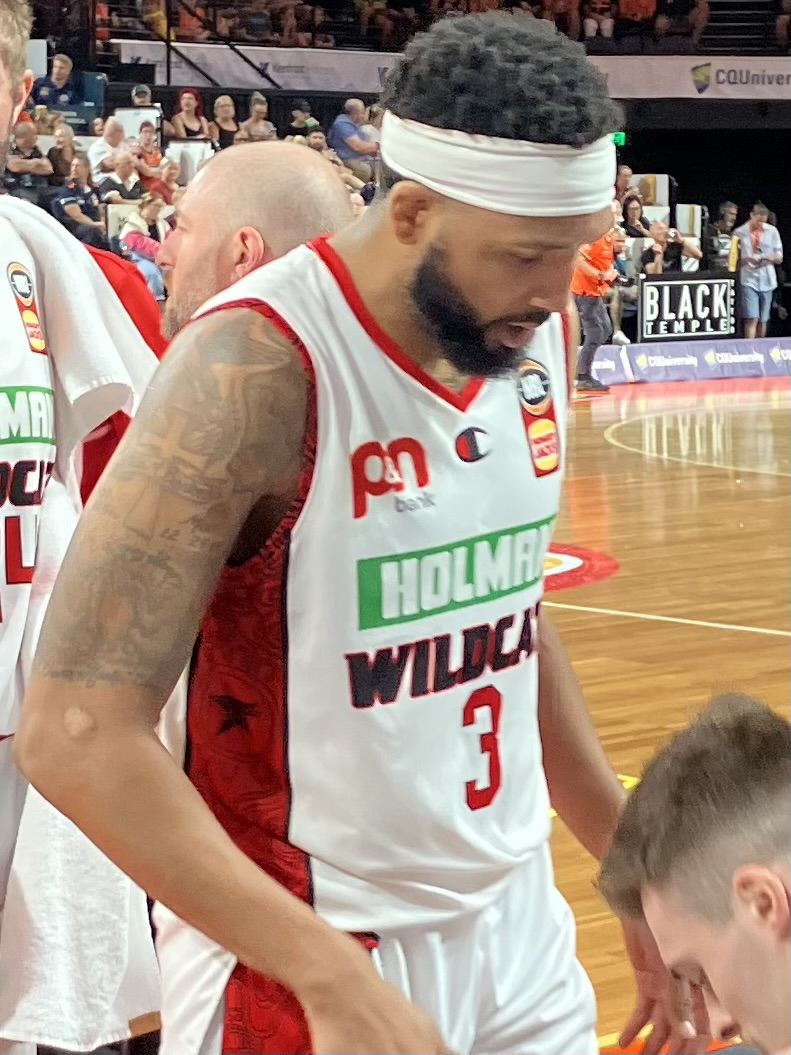
- Thomas with the Perth Wildcats in 2022

No. 35 – Le Mans
- Position: Power forward / center
- League: LNB Élite; EuroCup

Personal information
- Born: February 27, 1993 (age 33) Las Vegas, Nevada, U.S.
- Listed height: 6 ft 8 in (2.03 m)
- Listed weight: 240 lb (109 kg)

Career information
- High school: Killeen (Killeen, Texas)
- College: Houston (2011–2014); Oklahoma (2014–2015)
- NBA draft: 2015: undrafted
- Playing career: 2015–present

Career history
- 2015–2016: Mitteldeutscher BC
- 2016–2017: Vanoli Cremona
- 2017–2018: Hapoel Holon
- 2018–2021: Hapoel Jerusalem
- 2021–2022: Le Mans
- 2022–2023: Perth Wildcats
- 2023: Metropolitans 92
- 2023–2024: Derthona Basket
- 2024–present: Le Mans

Career highlights
- LNB Pro A All-First Team (2022); LNB All-Star (2022); 3× Israeli State Cup winner (2018–2020); Israeli League Cup winner (2019); Israeli State Cup MVP (2019); Israeli League Defensive Player of the Year (2019); All-Champions League First Team (2020); Third-team All-Big 12 (2015); Big 12 Newcomer of the Year (2015); Big 12 All-Newcomer Team (2015); Second-team All-AAC (2014); First-team All-C-USA (2013); C-USA All-Defensive Team (2013); C-USA All-Freshman Team (2012)

TaShawn Thomas (born February 27, 1993) is an American professional basketball player for Le Mans of the LNB Élite and the EuroCup. He played college basketball for the University of Houston and the University of Oklahoma before playing professionally in Germany, Italy, Israel, France and Australia. In 2019, he was named the Israeli State Cup MVP and the Israeli League Defensive Player of the Year.

== College career ==
A 6 ft 8 in (2.03 m) forward from Las Vegas, Nevada, Thomas played three seasons at Houston. As a junior, he averaged 15.4 points and 8.1 rebounds per game. He opted to transfer to Oklahoma for his senior season. As a senior, Thomas was named Big 12 Newcomer of the Year and a Third Team All-Big 12 selection. He scored in double figures 17 times and had 42 blocked shots, shooting 51.4 percent for the season. In his senior year, he averaged 11.6 points and 6.5 rebounds per game.

== Professional career ==
=== Mitteldeutscher (2015–2016) ===
After going undrafted in the 2015 NBA draft, Thomas played with the Orlando Magic in the Summer League. On July 29, 2015, Thomas signed with the German club Mitteldeutscher BC.

=== Vanoli Cremona (2016–2017) ===
On June 26, 2016, Thomas joined the Los Angeles Clippers for the 2016 NBA Summer League. On July 9, 2016, Thomas sign with the Italian club Vanoli Cremona. On January 2, 2017, Thomas recorded a career-high 25 points, shooting 9-of-14 from the field, along with six rebounds and four blocks in an 85–71 win over Varese.

=== Hapoel Holon (2017–2018) ===
On July 19, 2017, Thomas signed with the Israeli team Hapoel Holon for the 2017–18 season. Thomas helped Holon to win the 2018 Israeli State Cup, as well as reaching the 2018 Israeli League Final, where they eventually lost to Maccabi Tel Aviv. In 55 games played during the 2017–18 season (both in the Israeli League and the Champions League), Thomas averaged 10.8 points, 5 rebounds, 1.3 assists and 1.1 blocks per game.

=== Hapoel Jerusalem (2018–2021) ===
On July 2, 2018, Thomas signed a two-year deal with Hapoel Jerusalem. In September 2018, Thomas was suspended by the Israeli anti-doping agency for three months after he tested positive to Cannabis use during the Israeli League playoffs. On February 14, 2019, Thomas recorded a double-double of 15 points and 10 rebounds, leading Jerusalem to win their fifth Israeli State Cup title after an 82–67 win over Maccabi Rishon LeZion. He was subsequently named the Final MVP. On June 7, 2019, Thomas was named the Israeli League Best Defender.

On June 24, 2019, Thomas signed a two-year contract extension with Jerusalem. On January 7, 2020, Thomas recorded a season-high 23 points without missing a single shot as he went 10 of 10 from the field, along with six rebounds in an 83–74 win over Rasta Vechta. Three days later, he was named the Champions League Game Day 10 MVP. Thomas re-signed with the team on August 12. In October 2020, Thomas was named to the All-BCL First Team of the 2019–20 season.

=== Le Mans (2021–2022) ===
On July 19, 2021, Thomas signed a one-year deal with the French team Le Mans of the LNB Pro A. He was named to the All-League First-Team after the regular season.

=== Perth Wildcats (2022–2023) ===
On July 26, 2022, Thomas signed with the Perth Wildcats in Australia for the 2022–23 NBL season.

=== Metropolitans 92 (2023) ===
On February 17, 2023, Thomas signed with Metropolitans 92 of the LNB Pro A for the rest of the 2022–23 season.

=== Derthona Basket (2023–2024) ===
On July 21, 2023, he signed with Derthona Basket of the Italian LBA.

=== Return to Le Mans (2024–present) ===
On June 3, 2024, he signed with Le Mans of the LNB Pro A for a second stint.

== Career statistics ==
Legend
GP	Games played	GS	Games started	MPG	Minutes per game
FG%	Field goal percentage	3P%	3-point field goal percentage	FT%	Free throw percentage
RPG	Rebounds per game	APG	Assists per game	SPG	Steals per game
BPG	Blocks per game	PPG	Points per game	**Bold**	Career high

=== College ===
Year	Team	GP	GS	MPG	FG%	3P%	FT%	RPG	APG	SPG	BPG	PPG
2011–12	Houston	30	30	28.2	.577	.000	.542	8.2	1.1	.8	2.1	10.7
2012–13	Houston	33	33	**32.5**	.552	.111	.638	**9.8**	**2.4**	1.0	1.7	**16.9**
2013–14	Houston	33	33	31.6	**.591**	**.167**	.595	8.1	1.9	**1.2**	**2.7**	15.4
2014–15	Oklahoma	**35**	**35**	29.7	.519	.000	**.691**	6.5	1.5	.6	1.5	11.6
Career		131	131	30.5	.559	.100	.622	8.1	1.7	.9	2.0	13.7
