= Yeshurun Hall =

Indoor basketball hall in Netanya, Israel

Coordinates: 32°20′06″N 34°51′23″E

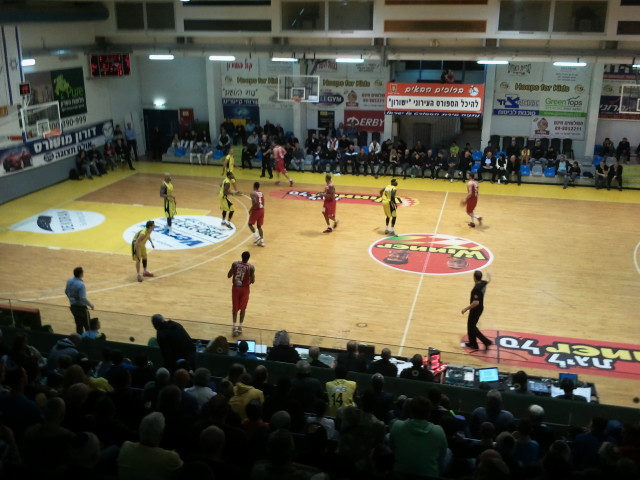
- Interactive map of Yeshurun Hall
- Location: Netanya, Israel
- Owner: City of Netanya
- Operator: City of Netanya
- Capacity: 1,000

Construction
- Opened: 1970s
- Renovated: 2006

Tenant
- Elitzur Ironi Netanya

Yeshurun Hall (Hebrew: אולם ישורון) is an indoor basketball hall in Netanya, Israel and the home of Elitzur Ironi Netanya. Nicknamed "HaKufsal", it has a capacity of 1,000.

The hall has also been used for the Maccabiah Games.
