= Josh Owens =

American basketball player (born 1988)

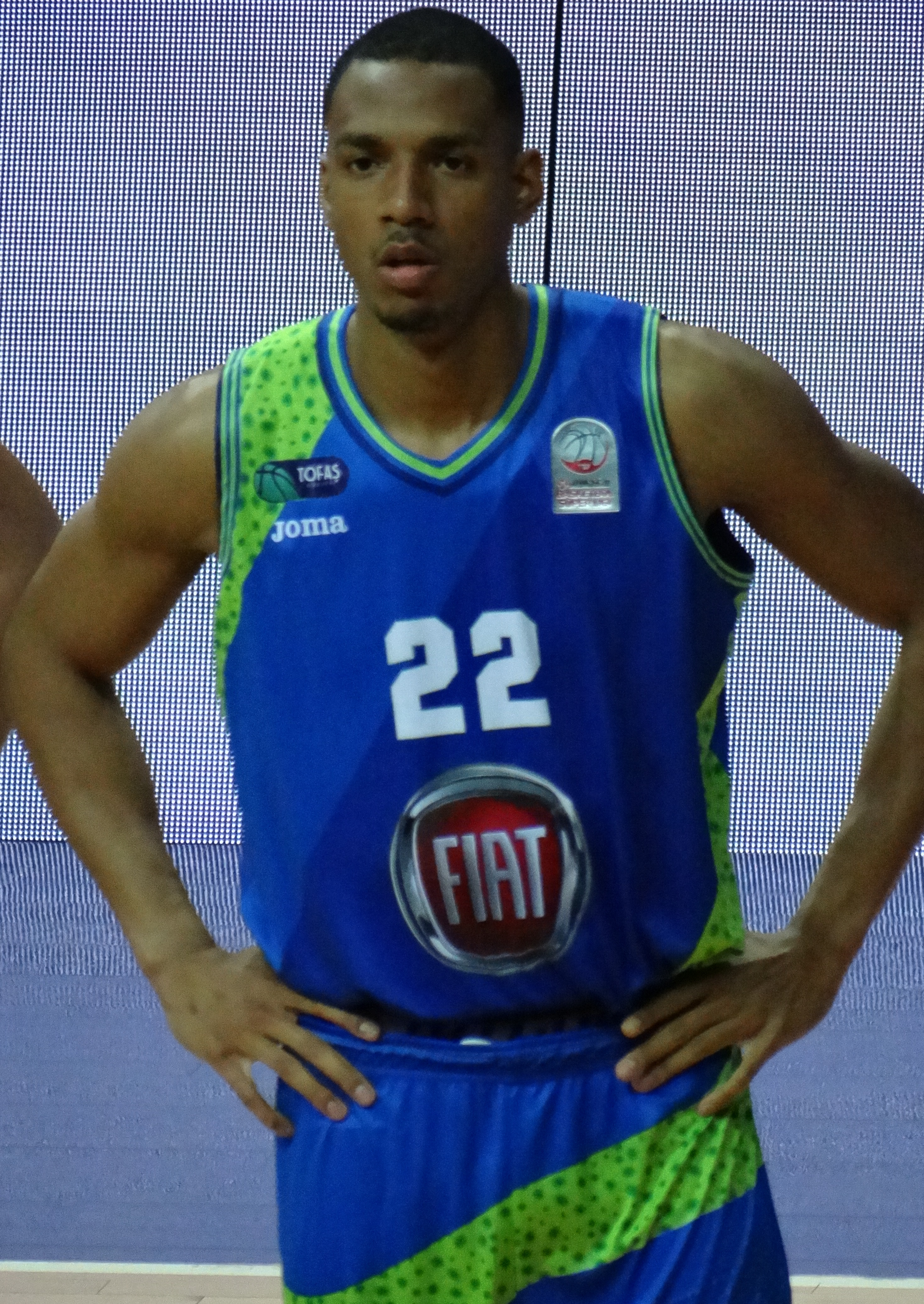
- Owens with Tofaş in 2018

Personal information
- Born: December 7, 1988 (age 37) Portsmouth, New Hampshire, US
- Listed height: 6 ft 9 in (2.06 m)
- Listed weight: 240 lb (109 kg)

Career information
- High school: Phillips Exeter Academy (Exeter, New Hampshire)
- College: Stanford (2007–2012)
- NBA draft: 2012: undrafted
- Playing career: 2012–2022
- Position: Power forward / center

Career history
- 2012–2013: Idaho Stampede
- 2013–2014: Hapoel Tel Aviv
- 2014–2015: Dolomiti Energa Trento
- 2015–2016: Umana Reyer Venezia
- 2016: AEK Athens
- 2016–2017: Pınar Karşıyaka
- 2017–2018: Tofaş
- 2018–2019: Hapoel Jerusalem
- 2019–2020: Grissin Bon Reggio Emilia
- 2020–2021: Bahçeşehir Koleji
- 2021: Metropolitans 92
- 2021: Ionikos Nikaias
- 2021–2022: Hapoel Tel Aviv

Career highlights
- Israeli Cup winner (2019); Israeli League All-Star (2014); Second-team All-Pac-12 (2012)

Joshua Colton Owens (born December 7, 1988) is an American former professional basketball player. He played college basketball for Stanford University before playing professionally in the NBA G League, Israel, Italy, Greece and Turkey.

== High school & college career ==
Owens was named 2007 New Hampshire Gatorade Player of the Year while playing high school basketball at Phillips Exeter Academy.

Owens played college basketball at Stanford, playing in the Pac-12 Conference of the NCAA Division I, from 2007 to 2012. He had a discreet freshman season, averaging 1.7 points and 1.4 rebounds in 5.8 minutes per game.

For his sophomore season he increased his averages to 6.9 points and 3.6 rebounds, adding a team-best 0.8 blocks in 20.7 minutes per game.

He had to sit out the 2009–10 season for a serious medical condition that was undisclosed that threatened his playing career. After undergoing examinations and consulting medical experts he was cleared to return the next year.

In his junior season, he started all 31 games, averaging 11.6 points, team-bests of 6.5 rebounds and 0.9 blocks, adding 0.8 steals in more than 27 minutes per game, including a career-high 31 points (along with 11 rebounds and 4 blocks) in a 26 February game against Oregon. He received an All-Pac-10 honorable mention and All-Pac-10 academic honours.

After posting 11.6 points and team-firsts 5.8 rebounds and 1.2 steals, he was a second-team All-Pac-12 selection, adding a 2012 National Invitation Tournament All-Tournament team selection as Stanford won the tournament.

== Professional career ==
=== Charlotte Bobcats and Idaho Stampede (2012–2013) ===
Considered a low profile player (who wasn't invited to the Portsmouth Invitational), Owens worked out with a number of NBA sides. His athleticism impressed but doubts were expressed about his output judging from his unremarkable numbers during his college career. After going undrafted in the 2012 NBA draft, he joined the Orlando Magic in the Orlando leg of the NBA Summer League from 9 to 13 July. Owens joined the Charlotte Bobcats for the Las Vegas Summer League from 15 to 20 July 2012, playing in 4 games for 5 points and 2.3 rebounds in nearly 10 minutes per game. He was signed by the Bobcats in September to take part in their training camp, after not playing in any pre-season games, Owens was released in October.

In December, Owens was acquired by the Idaho Stampede of the NBA Development League. He averaged 5.4 points and 4.6 rebounds in the league.

=== Hapoel Tel Aviv (2013–2014) ===
Owens joined the New Orleans Pelicans for the 2013 NBA Summer League in July. He then spent the preseason with Italian side Montepaschi Siena before signing with Israeli team Hapoel Tel Aviv in September. On February 25, 2014, Owens participated in the 2014 Israeli League All-Star Game and the Slam Dunk Contest during the same event.

Owens helped Hapoel reach the 2014 Israeli League Playoffs as the fourth seed, but they eventually were eliminated by Hapoel Eilat in the Quarterfinals. In 32 games played for Hapoel, he averaged 10.1 points and 7 rebounds per game.

=== Dolomiti Energa Trento (2014–2015) ===
After a 2014 NBA Summer League participation with the Sacramento Kings in which he had little playing time, On July 28, 2014, Owens joined Italian Serie A side Dolomiti Energa Trento for the 2014–15 season. On December 15, 2014, Owens recorded a career high 24 points, shooting 12-of-13 from the field, along with nine rebounds, three assists and three steals in a 104–82 win over Dinamo Sassari.

Owens averaged 13.5 points and 6.5 rebounds in 33 games as newly promoted Trento reached the Serie A playoffs.

=== Umana Reyer Venezia (2015–2016) ===
On June 25, 2015, Owens signed with fellow Serie A team Umana Reyer Venezia for the 2015–16 season. Owens helped Venezia reach the 2016 Serie A Semifinals, where they eventually lost to EA7 Emporio Armani Milano.

=== AEK / Pınar Karşıyaka (2016–2017) ===
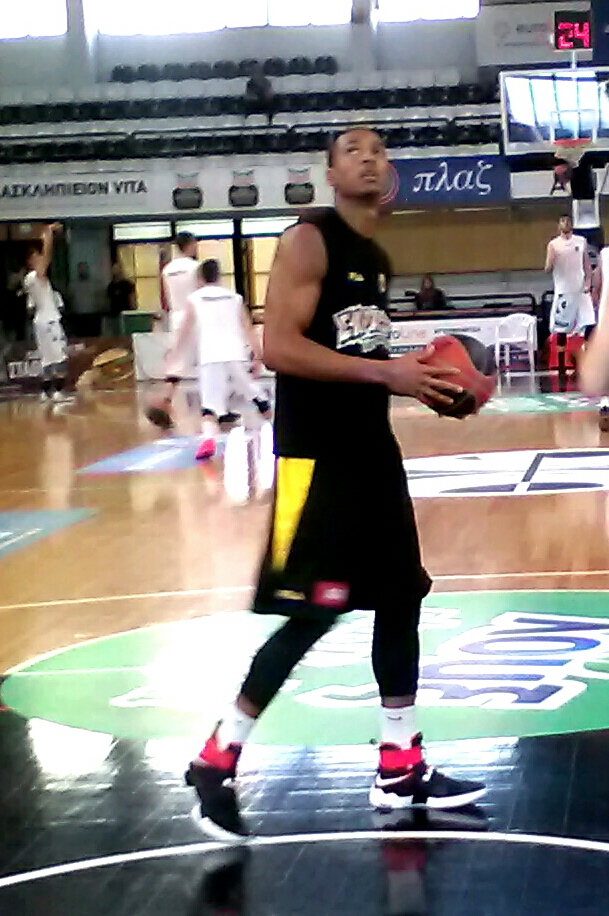
Owens with AEK in October 2016

On June 18, 2016, Owens signed with AEK Athens of the Greek League. However, on October 10, 2016, he parted ways with AEK after appearing in one game. On the same day, he signed with the Turkish team Pınar Karşıyaka for the rest of the season. Owens helped Karşıyaka reach the 2017 Champions League Quarterfinals, where they eventually lost to his former team Reyer Venezia.

=== Tofaş (2017–2018) ===
On July 1, 2017, Owens signed with Tofaş for the 2017–18 season. Owens helped Tofaş reach the 2018 Turkish League Finals, where they eventually lost to Fenerbahçe. In 54 games played during the 2017–18 season, he averaged 7.9 points and 3.5 rebounds per game.

=== Hapoel Jerusalem (2018–2019) ===
On July 18, 2018, Owens signed a 1+1 deal with the Israeli team Hapoel Jerusalem, joining his former teammate J'Covan Brown. On December 22, 2018, Owens recorded a career-high 16 rebounds, along with a season-high 17 points in an 87–64 win over Maccabi Ashdod. Owens went on to win the 2019 Israeli State Cup with Jerusalem.

=== Grissin Bon Reggio Emilia (2019–2020) ===
On August 10, 2019, Owens returned to Italy for a second stint, signing with Grissin Bon Reggio Emilia for the 2019–20 season.

=== Bahçeşehir Koleji (2020–2021) ===
On June 30, 2020, he has signed with Bahçeşehir Koleji of the Turkish Basketball Super League (BSL).

=== Metropolitans 92 (2021) ===
On February 2, 2021, he has signed with Levallois Metropolitans of the LNB Pro A.

=== Ionikos Nikaias (2021) ===
On September 13, 2021, Owens returned to Greece, signing with FIBA Europe Cup club Ionikos Nikaias. He averaged 6 points, 5.2 rebounds and 1.2 blocks, before moving to Hapoel Tel Aviv on November 21 of the same year.

=== Hapoel Tel Aviv (2021–2022) ===
On November 21, 2021, Owens signed with Israel club Hapoel Tel Aviv for the rest of the season.

On October 16, 2022, he has announced his retirement from professional basketball.

== Personal life ==
Owens is the son of Darrell and Tanna Owens. His brother, Jerryck, played professional basketball in Portugal.
