= 2010–11 Israeli Basketball State Cup =

The 2010–11 Israeli Basketball State Cup was the 51st edition of the Israeli Basketball State Cup, organized by the Israel Basketball Association. 26 teams took part in the competition. The semifinals and finals was played at the Yad Eliyahu Arena in Tel Aviv. The heavily favored Maccabi Tel Aviv defeated Barak Netanya in the championship.

== Main draw ==
Following IBA's rules, the current champions, Hapoel Gilboa Galil, and the cup holders, Maccabi Tel Aviv, have been drawn straight into the quarterfinals, into different halves of the draw. Two other random teams, Bnei HaSharon and Barak Netanya, have been drawn straight into the second round.

First round
Maccabi Habik'a	77
Ironi Ramat Gan	70
Ironi Nahariya	65
Ironi Ashkelon	87
Hapoel Lev haSharon	91
Maccabi Ashdod	98
Bnei HaSharon
Bye
Hapoel Afula	91
Hapoel Yokneam Megido	77
Maccabi Be'er Ya'akov	78
Hapoel Jerusalem	96
Maccabi Hod HaSharon	80
Hapoel Be'eri	78
Barak Netanya
Bye
Elitzur Ramla	76
Maccabi Haifa	126
Hapoel Kfar Saba	71
Maccabi Rishon LeZion	87
Elitzur Yavne	72
Hapoel Tel Aviv	93
Hapoel Kiryat Tiv'on	76
Hapoel Holon	80

Second round
Maccabi Tel Aviv
Bye
Maccabi H'abika	70
Ironi Ashkelon	78
Maccabi Ashdod	88
Bnei HaSharon	74
Hapoel Gilboa Galil
Bye
Hapoel Afula	75
Hapoel Jerusalem	83
Maccabi Hod HaSharon	48
Barak Netanya	93
Maccabi Haifa	92
Maccabi Rishon LeZion	73
Hapoel Tel Aviv	93
Hapoel Holon	85

Quarterfinals
Maccabi Tel Aviv	105
Ironi Ashkelon	75
Maccabi Ashdod	72
Hapoel Gilboa Galil	71
Hapoel Jerusalem	58
Barak Netanya	64
Maccabi Haifa	92
Hapoel Tel Aviv	106

Semifinals
Maccabi Tel Aviv	98
Maccabi Ashdod	61
Barak Netanya	78
Hapoel Tel Aviv	77

final
Maccabi Tel Aviv	106
Barak Netanya	70

== See also ==
- 2010–11 Israeli Basketball Super League
- Israeli Basketball State Cup
