= Alex Chubrevich =

Israeli basketball player

Alex Chubrevich Алексей Чубревич אלכס צ'וברביץ
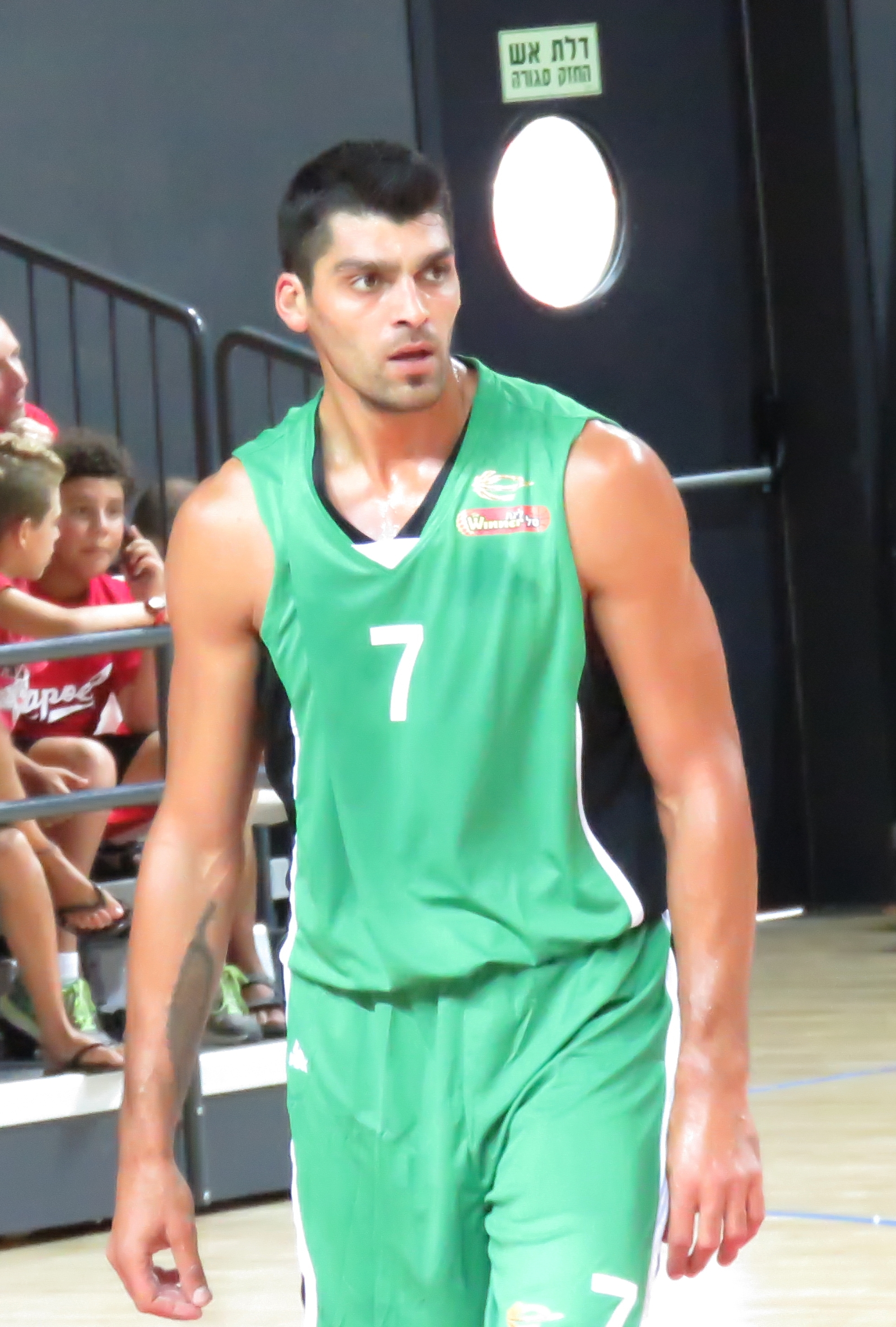
- Chubrevich with Maccabi Haifa in 2015

No. 7 – Maccabi Kiryat Gat
- Position: Center
- League: Liga Leumit

Personal information
- Born: July 23, 1986 (age 40) Komsomolsk-on-Amur, Soviet Union
- Listed height: 2.12 m (6 ft 11 in)
- Listed weight: 113 kg (249 lb)

Career history
- 2008–2009: Hapoel Gilboa Galil
- 2011–2012: Barak Netanya
- 2012–2016: Maccabi Haifa
- 2016–2017: Hapoel Holon
- 2017–2018: Maccabi Ashdod
- 2018–2019: Hapoel Jerusalem
- 2019: Maccabi Rishon LeZion
- 2019–2020: Maccabi Ashdod
- 2020–2023: Maccabi Haifa
- 2023–2026: Ironi Nahariya
- 2026–present: Maccabi Kiryat Gat

Career highlights
- Israeli League champion (2013); Israeli Cup winner (2019)

Alex Chubrevich (Hebrew: אלכס צ'וברביץ, Russian: Алексей « Алекс » Чубревич; born July 23, 1986) is an Israeli professional basketball player for Maccabi Kiryat Gat of the Israeli Liga Leumit. A Russian-born Jew, he is 2.12 m (6 ft 11 in) in height, and weighs 113 kilograms (249 lb), playing the center position.

== Early life ==
Until his senior year in high school Chubrevich played volleyball, before moving to basketball.

== Professional career ==
On September 4, 2017, Chubrevich signed with Maccabi Ashdod for the 2017–18 season, joining his former head coach Brad Greenberg. Chubrevich helped Ashdod reach the 2018 Israeli League Playoffs, where they eventually lost to Hapoel Tel Aviv in the Quarterfinals.

On July 9, 2018, Chubrevich signed a two-year deal with Hapoel Jerusalem. Chubrevich won the 2019 Israeli State Cup with Jerusalem.

On August 26, 2019, Chubrevich signed with Maccabi Rishon LeZion for the 2019–20 season, replacing Ben Altit. On October 31, 2019, he parted ways with Rishon LeZion to join Maccabi Ashdod for a second stint.

== See also ==
- List of select Jewish basketball players
