= Elijah Hirsh =

American-Israeli basketball player

Elijah Hirsh אלייז'ה הירש
No. 11 – Ironi Kiryat Ata
- Position: Forward
- League: Israeli Basketball Premier League

Personal information
- Born: August 25, 1997 (age 29) Woodstock, Georgia
- Listed height: 6 ft 8 in (2.03 m)
- Listed weight: 220 lb (100 kg)

Career information
- High school: Woodstock (Woodstock, Georgia); The King's Academy (Woodstock, Georgia)
- College: Berry (2017–2019)
- NBA draft: 2020: undrafted
- Playing career: 2019–present

Career history
- 2019–2021: Ironi Kiryat Ata
- 2021–2023: Maccabi Ironi Ramat Gan

Elijah Hirsh (Hebrew: אלייז'ה הירש; born August 25, 1997) is an American-Israeli basketball player. He plays the forward position.

== Biography ==
Hirsh was born in Woodstock, Georgia, to Michael and Jo Lynn Hirsh. He is 6 ft 8 in (203 cm) tall, and weighs 220 pounds (100 kg).

He attended Woodstock High School and The King's Academy in Woodstock.

Hirsh then attended Berry College (Business Administration; '19). In 2018 he was named Southern Athletic Association All-Second Team and All-Tournament Team, First Team All-Conference, and broke the single-game record for blocks in Berry's NCAA DIII era with 10 blocks. In 2019, he averaged 17.5 points (second in the SAA), 9.2 rebounds (leading the SAA), and 1.9 blocks per game, and was named SAA Player of the Year, SAA All-First Team, and National Association of Basketball Coaches All-District South First Team, and Google Cloud Academic All-District.

He plays for Ironi Kiryat Ata in the Israeli Basketball Premier League, with whom Hirsh signed a two-year deal in July 2019.
