= Yogev Ohayon =

Israeli basketball player (born 1987)

Yogev Ohayon יוגב אוחיון
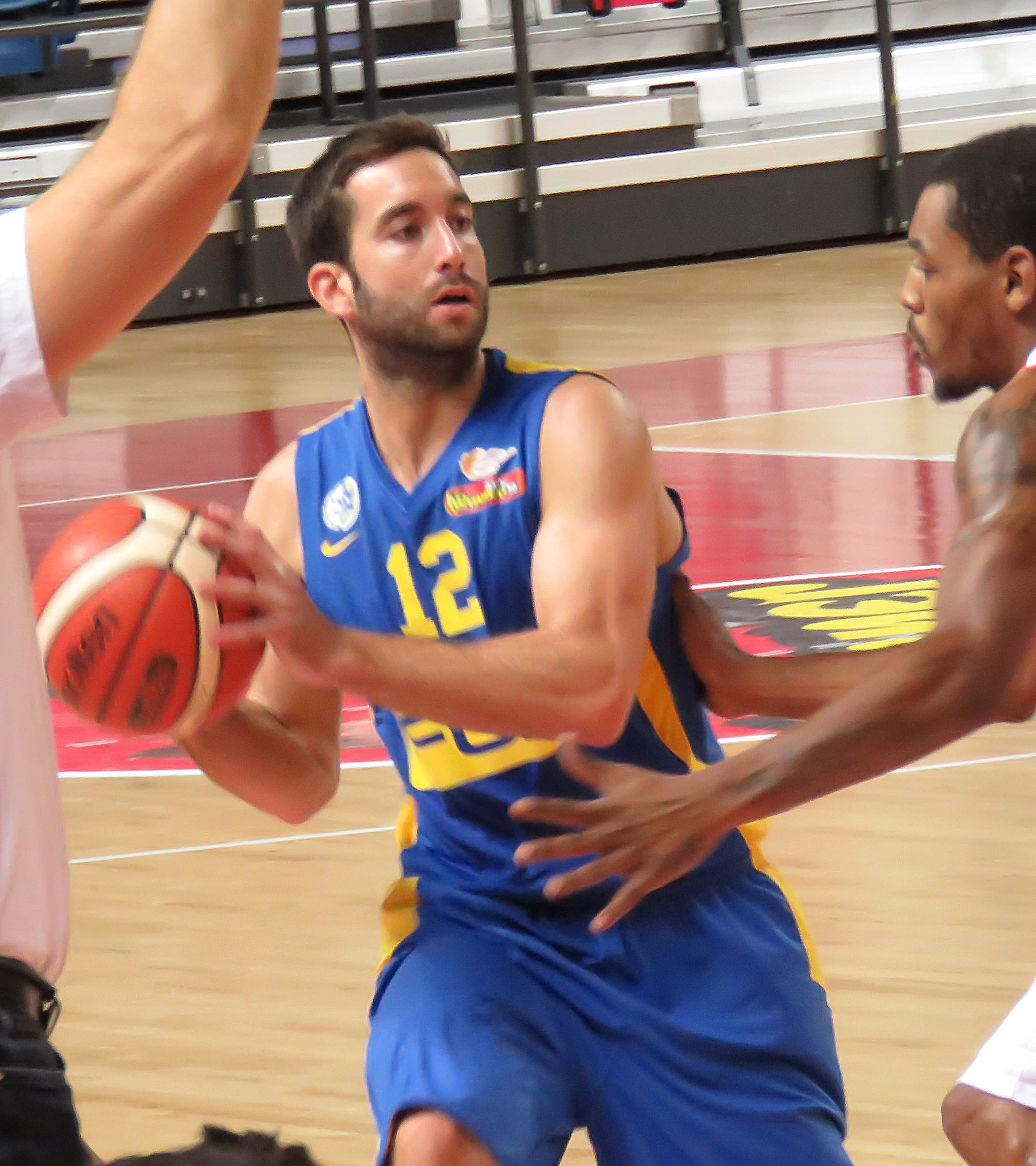
- Ohayon with Maccabi Tel Aviv

No. 12 – Elitzur Netanya
- Position: Point guard
- League: Liga Leumit

Personal information
- Born: 24 April 1987 (age 39) Safed, Israel
- Listed height: 1.90 m (6 ft 3 in)
- Listed weight: 86 kg (190 lb)

Career information
- NBA draft: 2009: undrafted
- Playing career: 2004–present

Career history
- 2004–2008: Hapoel Galil Elyon
- 2008–2009: Ironi Nahariya
- 2009–2011: Hapoel Jerusalem
- 2011–2017: Maccabi Tel Aviv
- 2017–2019: Hapoel Jerusalem
- 2019–2021: Hapoel Holon
- 2021–2026: Ironi Nahariya
- 2026–present: Elitzur Netanya

Career highlights
- EuroLeague champion (2014); 2× Israeli League champion (2012, 2014); 7× Israeli Cup winner (2012–2017, 2019); Israeli Basketball Premier League Finals MVP (2012); Israeli League steals leader (2008)

Yogev Ohayon (Hebrew: יוגב אוחיון; born 24 April 1987) is an Israeli professional basketball player for Elitzur Netanya of the Liga Leumit. Internationally he represented the Israel national team, and was named the Israeli Basketball Premier League Finals MVP in 2012. Standing at 1.90 m (6 ft 3 in), he plays as a point guard.

== Professional career ==
Born in Safed, Israel, Ohayon started his career in Hapoel Galil Elyon, with whom he won the Israeli youth league championship. In the 2006–07 season, he led Hapoel Galil Elyon to the Israeli final four, with the team ultimately finishing in third place. In the 2007–08 season, Ohayon was the Ligat Winner's steals leader, with two steals per game.

In July 2011, he signed a three-year deal with Maccabi Tel Aviv. He was the 2012 Israeli Basketball Premier League Finals MVP.

In the summer of 2012, Ohayon went to Russia for a medical test, before signing a contract with Lokomotiv Kuban, without informing Maccabi, with whom he still had a contract. Ohayon was not allowed to sign for any other team, before buying out his contract for around US$200,000. However, on 19 September 2012, FIBA ruled in favour of Maccabi Tel Aviv, after the team sued Ohayon through FIBA. If Ohayon wanted to leave Maccabi Tel Aviv, Lokomotiv Kuban would have to have reached an agreement on a buyout with his former club. Ohayon signed a new a deal with Maccabi instead, and agreed with them on a new three-year contract.

On 9 July 2017, Ohayon signed a three-year deal with Hapoel Jerusalem. In his second season with Jerusalem, he helped the team win the 2019 Israeli State Cup.

On 7 July 2019, Ohayon signed a two-year deal with Hapoel Holon, joining his former teammate Guy Pnini.

== Career statistics ==
Legend
GP	Games played	GS	Games started	MPG	Minutes per game
FG%	Field-goal percentage	3P%	3-point field-goal percentage	FT%	Free-throw percentage
RPG	Rebounds per game	APG	Assists per game	SPG	Steals per game
BPG	Blocks per game	PPG	Points per game	PIR	Performance index rating
**Bold**	Career high

=== EuroLeague ===
†	Denotes seasons in which Ohayon won the EuroLeague

Year	Team	GP	GS	MPG	FG%	3P%	FT%	RPG	APG	SPG	BPG	PPG	PIR
2011–12	Maccabi	21	15	20.6	.380	.346	.675	**3.4**	2.6	**1.4**	—	5.6	7.4
2012–13	Maccabi	**27**	**27**	**25.3**	**.448**	.385	.644	2.7	**3.8**	1.0	.0	**7.2**	**8.6**
2013–14†	Maccabi	**27**	23	20.5	.442	.383	.737	2.0	3.2	.8	**.1**	5.7	6.8
2014–15	Maccabi	26	23	25.1	.359	.379	.563	3.1	**3.8**	**1.4**	**.1**	5.5	7.7
2015–16	Maccabi	10	6	18.6	.365	.250	**.909**	1.9	2.9	.6	**.1**	5.3	3.6
2016–17	Maccabi	**27**	10	17.9	.404	**.440**	.655	1.7	2.7	.9	**.1**	5.3	5.7
Career		138	104	21.6	.405	.379	.665	2.5	3.2	1.1	.1	5.8	7

== See also ==
- List of select Jewish basketball players
