= Elitzur Netanya B.C. =

Basketball club of Netanya, Israel

Elitzur Netanya
- Leagues: Liga Leumit
- Founded: 1959; 67 years ago
- History: Elitzur Netanya (1959–1998); Barak Netanya (1998–2015); Elitzur Ironi Netanya (2016–present)
- Arena: Arena Netanya
- Capacity: 2,500
- Location: Netanya, Israel
- Team colors: Yellow and Black
- Head coach: Amit Sharaf
- Championships: 1 Liga Leumit; 1 Association Cup
- Website: elizur-netanya.com
| Home | Away |

Elitzur Ironi Netanya (Hebrew: אליצור עירוני נתניה) is an Israeli professional basketball club based in Netanya, Israel. The team currently plays in the Liga Leumit, the second tier on the basketball pyramid in Israel, following their relegation from the Israeli Basketball Premier League at the end of the 2025–26 season.

== History ==
=== Elitzur Netanya (1959–1998) ===
Elizur Netanya was promoted to the first league in 1985. In their first season, the team qualified for the playoff finals against Maccabi Tel Aviv but lost both games in the Playoffs. Among the most prominent stars of Elitzur Netanya were: Willie Sims, Carl Neverson, Terry Fair, Danny Bracha and Jimmy Hall. In their second season in the first division, the team finished in fourth place. In their third season, the team qualified for the Israeli Basketball State Cup finals, but the team was defeated by Hapoel Galil Elyon.

In the 1988–89 season, the team struggled against the relegation to the second division, but finally the team finished in tenth place and secured their place in the first division. However, the team could not open the next season and in fact did not appear at all due to heavy debts and the team relegated to the lower leagues. In total, the team played for four consecutive seasons (1985–1989) in the first division.

=== Barak Netanya (1998–2005) ===
At the end of the 1998 season, Elitzur was merged with Maccabi Netanya and renamed "Elizur Maccabi Natanya". One year later, they decided to add to the club's title the name "Barak", following a plane crash incident of Netanya's fan - Zvi Barak, who entered into coma.

From 2000 to 2006, Netanya climbed back from League A (Fourth-tier division) to the Liga Leumit (Second-tier division). In the 2006–07 season, the team was close to promote to the Israeli Basketball Premier League but they were eliminated by Elitzur Kiryat Ata in a playoff series for the third place leading to the Premier League.

In the 2007–08 season, Netanya led the Liga Leumit's table, losing only one game during the regular season. In the playoffs, They defeated Hapoel Tivon, Hod Hasharon and Hapoel Afula in the Playoffs and was promoted back to the Premier League.

In the 2009–10 season, Netanya reached the Israeli League Final Four as the fifth seed. Netanya defeated Maccabi Haifa 3–1 in the Quarterfinals, but eventually they lost to Maccabi Tel Aviv in the Semifinals.

In the 2010–11 season, Netanya reached the 2011 Israeli State Cup Finals, but they lost to Maccabi Tel Aviv.

In the summer of 2014, Netanya was relegated to Liga Leumit due to financial difficulties.

In the 2014–2015 season, Netanya finished the Liga Leumit regular season as fifth seed, but they were eliminated in the playoff semifinals by Ironi Kiryat Ata.

On July 21, 2015, Barak Netanya was dissolved due to financial issues.

=== Elitzur cosmos real estate Netanya (2016–present) ===
In the summer of 2016, the team was re-established and changed their name to "Elizur cosmos real estate Netanya" and played in the Liga Artzit.

In the 2016–17 season, Netanya led the Liga Artzit's and reached the finals, but they eventually lost to Maccabi Kiryat Motzkin.

In the 2017–18 season, Netanya was promoted to the Liga Leumit after they defeated A.S. Ramat Hasharon 2-1 in the finals.

In 2021, Netanya was promoted to the Israeli Basketball Premier League, after placing the top two places of the 2020–21 National League.

== Current roster ==
Elitzur Netanya roster
Players
Coaches

| Pos. | No. | Nat. | Name | Ht. | Age |
|---|---|---|---|---|---|
| PF | 0 | (United States) | Oliver, Cameron | 2.03 m (6 ft 8 in) | 30 – 11 July 1996 |
| G | 5 | (Israel) | Orland, Omri | 1.90 m (6 ft 3 in) | 17 – 4 September 2009 |
| G | 7 | (Israel) | Tyomkin, Efi | 1.90 m (6 ft 3 in) | 26 – 20 February 2000 |
| SG | 9 | (Israel) | Peled, Tal | 1.95 m (6 ft 5 in) | 24 – 14 September 2002 |
| SG | 10 | (United States) | DeVoe, Gabe | 1.91 m (6 ft 3 in) | 30 – 16 December 1995 |
| F | 11 | (Israel) | Schreier, Dan | 1.99 m (6 ft 6 in) | 21 – 13 July 2005 |
| PG | 12 | (Israel) | Ohayon, Yogev | 1.90 m (6 ft 3 in) | 39 – 24 April 1987 |
| F | 13 | (Israel) | Weinberg, Noam | 2.01 m (6 ft 7 in) | 28 – 16 August 1998 |
| F | 17 | (Israel) | Porat, Tomer | 2.01 m (6 ft 7 in) | 27 – 29 March 1999 |
| G | 18 | (Israel) | Turgeman, Nissim | 1.90 m (6 ft 3 in) | 19 – 8 May 2007 |
| F/C | 20 | (United States) | Lane, Ishmael | 2.05 m (6 ft 9 in) | 29 – 20 June 1997 |
| G | 32 | (Israel) | Rapaport, Niki | 1.82 m (6 ft 0 in) | 18 – 8 June 2008 |
| F | 34 | (United States) | Aldrich, Josh | 2.01 m (6 ft 7 in) | 26 – 29 November 1999 |
| F | 55 | (Israel) | Yanai, Eitan | 2.02 m (6 ft 8 in) | 22 – 5 November 2003 |
| F | 73 | (Israel) | Lavy, Oz | 1.98 m (6 ft 6 in) | 23 – 19 January 2003 |

Head coach

- (Israel) Amit Sharaf

Assistant coach(es)

- (Israel) Ilan Amar
- (Israel) Or Janah
- (Israel) Meir Owadeyah

Physiotherapist(s)

- (Israel) Daniel Malka

Legend

- (C) Team captain
- Injured

- Roster
Updated: September 1, 2026

=== Depth chart ===
| Pos. | Starting 5 | Bench 1 | Bench 2 |
|---|---|---|---|
| C | Ishmael Lane | Cameron Oliver | Noam Weinberg |
| PF | Josh Aldrich | Eitan Yanai | Dan Schreier |
| SF | Tomer Porat | Tal Peled | Oz Lavy |
| SG | Gabe DeVoe | Efi Tyomkin | Nissim Turgeman |
| PG | Yogev Ohayon | Omri Orland | Niki Rapaport |

== Notable players ==
Note: Flags indicate national team eligibility at FIBA-sanctioned events. Players may hold other non-FIBA nationalities not displayed.

Criteria

To appear in this section a player must have either:

- Set a club record or won an individual award while at the club
- Played at least one official international match for their national team at any time
- Played at least one official NBA match at any time.

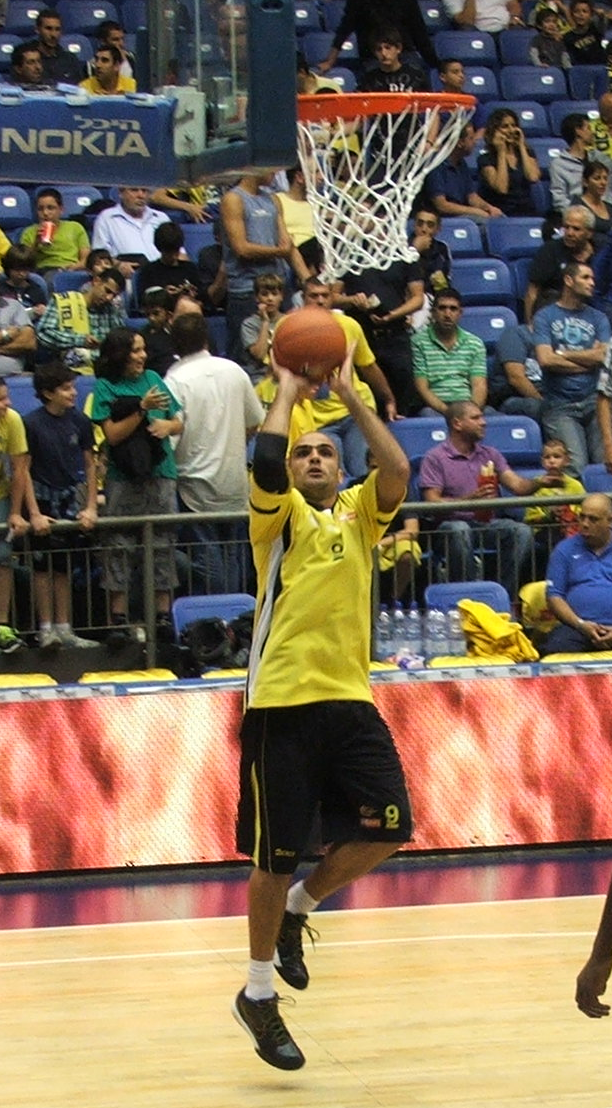
Eliran Guetta

- (United States) Brian Asbury
- (United States) Kenny Boynton
- (United States) Ramel Bradley
- (United States) Elton Brown
- (United States) Rashaun Freeman
- (United States) Marco Killingsworth
- (United States) Errick McCollum
- (United States) Skip Mills
- (United States) Raymar Morgan
- (United States) Carl Neverson
- (United States) Dawan Robinson
- (United States) Tony Washam
- (United States) Deron Washington
- (United States) (Dominican Republic) J. R. Pinnock
- (United States) (Israel) Adrian Banks
- (United States) (Israel) David Blatt
- (United States) (Israel) Terry Fair
- (United States) (Israel) Steve Malovic
- (United States) (Israel) Willie Sims
- (United States) (Israel) Tony Younger
- (United States) (Italy) Christian Burns
- (United States) (North Macedonia) Romeo Travis
- (United States) (Ukraine) Jerome Randle
- (Israel) Danny Bracha
- (Israel) Shmulik Brener
- (Israel) Or Goren
- (Israel) Eliran Guetta
- (Israel) Raviv Limonad
- (Israel) Yehu Orland
- (Israel) Amit Simhon
- (Israel) Tal Baron.
- (Israel) Tal Perry
- (Israel) Eran Mizrahi
- (Israel) Nitzan Avituv
- (United States) David Cook
- (United States) Ronald Mor
- (Israel) Daniel Gut
- (Israel) Avi Fogel

== Former managers ==
- (Israel) Ralf Klein
- (Israel) Zvika Sherf
- (Israel) Danny Franco
- (Israel) Eric Alfasi

== Honours ==
- Domestic Championship:
  - Runners-up (1): 1985–86
- Domestic Cup:
  - Runners-up (2): 1987–88, 2010–11

=== Lower division competitions ===
- Liga Leumit: (2nd)
  - Champions (1): 2008–09
  - Regular season champions (2): 2007–08, 2008–09
- Liga Artzit (3rd)

Winners: 2005 (North Division), 2018 (North Division)

- Association Cup:
  - Champions (1): 2009
