= The Biggest Loser season 3 =

Season of television series

The Biggest Loser
- Season 3
- No. of episodes: 12

Release
- Original network: NBC
- Original release: September 20 – November 29, 2006

Season chronology
- ← Previous; Season 2 Next → Season 4

The Biggest Loser season 3 is the third season of the NBC reality television series entitled The Biggest Loser. The third season premiered on September 20, 2006, with fifty overweight contestants (one from each US state), each competing to lose the most weight. However, first, the group would be narrowed down to 14 after the trainers each selected seven competitors for their teams. The show was hosted by comedian Caroline Rhea. Bob Harper and Kim Lyons were the two personal trainers, with Bob leading the blue team and Kim leading the red team. The show's opening theme song was "Proud" by Heather Small. The opening credits showed each contestant in turn and displayed his or her starting weights. Guest appearance in the season featured Fitness personal trainer Clark Shao.

Each week of the show, one contestant was voted off by the others. Midway through the show, the two at-home participants who lost the most weight came back on the ranch. Ultimately, a set of four finalists were determined before the show began airing. On the final episode, aired live, those finalists reunited for a weigh-in to determine the winner. At the finale, it was revealed that Heather would not weigh in to compete for the prize money because she was five months pregnant. Of the three other finalists, Erik had the largest percentage of weight loss, with 214 lbs, which was 52.58% of his starting body weight. He received $250,000 for this feat. Poppi from New Jersey, who lost the most of the 36 who did not make it to the regular season won $50,000, and the individual who lost the most out of the remaining 14 (including Jaron and Adrian, the two at-home players who returned to the ranch) who were on the show, but not finalists, won $100,000. This player was Brian from California, who lost 50.65% of his weight.

== Contestants ==
Contestant	Team	Status
Erik Chopin, 35, West Islip, New York	Blue Team	Biggest Loser
Kai Hibbard, 27, Eagle River, Alaska	Red Team	Runner-Up
Mark Wylie, 40, Miami Beach, Florida	Red Team	2nd Runner-Up
Heather Hansen, 36, West Bountiful, Utah	Red Team	Pregnant
Jaron Tate, 27, Hot Springs, Arkansas	Returning Player	Eliminated Week 11
Adrian Kortesmaki, 22, Grand Forks, North Dakota	Returning Player	Eliminated Week 10
Marty Wolff, 25, Kansas City, Missouri	Blue Team	Eliminated Week 9
Bobby Moore, 31, Murfreesboro, Tennessee	Blue Team	Eliminated Week 8
Brian Starkey, 33, Valley Village, Los Angeles	Blue Team	Eliminated Week 7
Pam Smith, 25, Martinsville, Indiana	Red Team	Eliminated Week 7
Ken Coleman, 43, Tacoma, Washington	Red Team	Eliminated Week 6
Amy Hildreth, 27, Baltimore, Maryland	Blue Team	Eliminated Week 5
Melinda Suttle, 32, Huntsville, Alabama	Blue Team	Eliminated Week 4
Nelson Potter, 35, Lawrence, Massachusetts	Red Team	Eliminated Week 3
Tiffany Hernandez, 27, Kingsville, Texas	Blue Team	Eliminated Week 2
Jennifer Eisenbarth, 32, Shakopee, Minnesota	Red Team	Eliminated Week 1

== Weigh-ins and eliminations ==
Contestant	Age	Height	Starting BMI	Ending BMI	Starting weight	Week												Weight lost	Percentage lost
Contestant	Age	Height	Starting BMI	Ending BMI	Starting weight	1	2	3	4	5	6	7	8	9	10	11	Finale	Weight lost	Percentage lost
Erik	35	6'2"	52.3	24.8	407	391	375	364	358	351	335	338	318	307	295	283	193	214	52.58%
Kai	27	5'5"	43.6	24.0	262	250	238	233	228	223	214	208	201	198	189	185	144	118	45.04%
Wylie	40	6'0"	41.6	24.1	307	293	275	269	264	255	248	242	236	236	224	217	178	129	42.02%
Heather	36	5'5"	37.1	X	223	214	206	201	196	193	187	182	186	179	174	167	Pregnant		
Jaron	27	6'2"	41.5	20.9	323							248	238	231	223	217	163	160	49.54%
Adrian	22	5'3"	40.2	29.9	227							174	170	163	161		169	58	25.55%
Marty	25	6'0"	49.5	29.7	365	345	329	322	315	308	293	286	282	274			219	146	40.00%
Bobby	31	6'1"	42.4	29.7	321	303	291	282	277	273	260	255	252				225	96	29.91%
Brian	33	5'11"	43.0	21.2	308	285	277	270	261	255	246	240					152	156	50.65%
Pam	25	5'7"	38.7	28.0	247	237	231	226	221	218	211	207					179	68	27.53%
Ken	43	6'4"	43.6	24.0	358	340	320	317	307	301	290						197	161	44.97%
Amy	27	5'10"	37.3	22.1	260	244	236	227	223	219							154	106	40.77%
Melinda	32	5'5"	39.3	28.6	236	225	221	211	209								172	64	27.12%
Nelson	35	6'5"	47.9	39.7	404	385	370	365									335	69	17.08%
Tiffany	27	5'8"	38.8	31.0	255	243	236										204	51	20.00%
Jen	32	5'4"	42.1	24.9	245	237											145	100	40.82%

Teams
Member of Kim's team
Member of Bob's team
Game
Last person eliminated before finale
The two 36 at home people who entered the ranch in Week 8
The result of the two at-home 36 that made to the ranch in Week 8
Winners
$250,000 Winner (among the finalists)
$100,000 Winner (among the eliminated contestants)
BMI
Normal (18.5 – 24.9 BMI)
Overweight (25 – 29.9 BMI)
Obese Class I (30 – 34.9 BMI)
Obese Class II (35 – 39.9 BMI)
Obese Class III (greater than 40 BMI)

=== Weigh-in figure history ===
Contestant	Week											
Contestant	1	2	3	4	5	6	7	8	9	10	11	Finale
Erik	−16	−16	−11	−6	−7	−16	+3	−20	−11	−12	−12	−90
Kai	−12	−12	−5	−5	−5	−9	−6	−7	−3	−9	−4	−41
Wylie	−14	−18	−6	−5	−9	−7	−6	−6	0	−12	−7	−39
Heather	−9	−8	−5	−5	−3	−6	−5	+4	−7	−5	−7	x
Jaron	-75							−10	−7	−8	−6	−54
Adrian	-53							−4	−7	−2	+8	
Marty	−20	−16	−7	−7	−7	−15	−7	−4	−8	-55		
Bobby	−18	−12	−9	−5	−4	−13	−5	−3	-27			
Brian	−23	−8	−7	−9	−6	−9	−6	-88				
Pam	−10	−6	−5	−5	−3	−7	−4	-28				
Ken	−18	−20	−3	−10	−6	−11	-93					
Amy	−16	−8	−9	−4	−4	-65						
Melinda	−11	−4	−10	−2	-37							
Nelson	−19	−15	−5	-30								
Tiffany	−12	−7	-32									
Jen	−8	-92										

=== Weigh-in percentage history ===
Contestant	Week											
Contestant	1	2	3	4	5	6	7	8	9	10	11	Finale
Erik	−3.93%	−4.09%	−2.93%	−1.65%	−1.96%	−4.56%	+0.90%	−5.92%	−3.46%	−3.91%	−4.07%	−31.80%
Kai	−4.58%	−4.80%	−2.10%	−2.15%	−2.19%	−4.04%	−2.80%	−3.37%	−1.49%	−4.55%	−2.12%	−22.16%
Wylie	−4.56%	−6.14%	−2.18%	−1.86%	−3.41%	−2.75%	−2.42%	−2.48%	0.00%	−5.08%	−3.13%	−17.97%
Heather	−4.04%	−3.74%	−2.43%	−2.49%	−1.53%	−3.11%	−2.67%	+2.20%	−3.76%	−2.79%	−4.02%	x
Jaron	-23.22%							−4.03%	−2.94%	−3.46%	−2.69%	−24.88%
Adrian	-23.35%							−2.30%	−4.12%	−1.23%	+4.97%	
Marty	−5.48%	−4.64%	−2.13%	−2.17%	−2.22%	−4.87%	−2.39%	−1.40%	−2.84%	-20.07%		
Bobby	−5.61%	−3.96%	−3.09%	−1.77%	−1.44%	−4.76%	−1.92%	−1.18%	-10.71%			
Brian	−7.47%	−2.81%	−2.53%	−3.33%	−2.30%	−3.53%	−2.44%	-36.67%				
Pam	−4.05%	−2.53%	−2.16%	−2.21%	−1.36%	−3.21%	−1.90%	-13.53%				
Ken	−5.03%	−5.88%	−0.94%	−3.15%	−1.95%	−3.65%	-32.07%					
Amy	−6.15%	−3.28%	−3.81%	−1.76%	−1.79%	-29.68%						
Melinda	−4.66%	−1.78%	−4.52%	−0.95%	-17.70%							
Nelson	−4.70%	−3.90%	−1.35%	-8.22%								
Tiffany	−4.71%	−2.88%	-13.56%									
Jen	−3.27%	-38.82%										

=== Overall percentage of weight loss (Biggest Loser on Campus) ===
Bold denotes who has the overall highest percentage of weight loss as of that week

Contestant	Week										
Contestant	1	2	3	4	5	6	7	8	9	10	11
Erik	−3.93%	−7.86%	-10.57%	−12.04%	−13.76%	−17.69%	−16.95%	−21.87%	−24.57%	−27.52%	−30.47%
Kai	−4.58%	−9.16%	−11.07%	−12.98%	−14.89%	−18.32%	−20.61%	−23.28%	−24.43%	−27.86%	-29.39%
Wylie	−4.56%	−10.42%	−12.38%	−14.01%	−16.94%	−19.22%	−21.17%	−23.13%	−23.13%	−27.04%	−29.32%
Heather	−4.04%	−7.62%	−9.87%	−12.11%	−13.45%	−16.14%	−18.39%	−16.59%	−19.73%	−21.97%	−25.11%
Jaron	-23.22%							**-26.32%**	**-28.48%**	**-30.96%**	**-32.82%**
Adrian	-23.35%							−25.11%	−28.19%	−29.07%	
Marty	−5.48%	−9.86%	−11.78%	−13.70%	−15.62%	−19.73%	−21.64%	−22.74%	−24.93%		
Bobby	−5.61%	−9.35%	−12.15%	−13.71%	−14.95%	−19.00%	−20.56%	−21.50%			
Brian	**-7.47%**	−10.06%	−12.34%	**-15.26%**	**-17.21%**	**-20.13%**	**-22.08%**				
Pam	−4.05%	−6.48%	−8.50%	−10.53%	−11.74%	−14.57%	−16.69%				
Ken	−5.03%	**-10.61%**	−11.45%	−14.25%	−15.92%	−18.99%					
Amy	−6.15%	−9.23%	**-12.69%**	−14.23%	−15.77%						
Melinda	−4.66%	−6.36%	−10.59%	−11.44%							
Nelson	−4.70%	−8.42%	−9.65%								
Tiffany	−4.71%	−7.45%									
Jen	−3.27%										

=== Thirty-six at home ===
36 people were eliminated in the first episode. However, the male and female with the highest percentage of weight lost after 8 weeks returned to the ranch. This turned out to be Jaron and Adrian (see chart above). Both were eliminated before the finale.

At the finale, host Caroline Rhea revealed that the at-home contestant who lost the highest percentage of weight would be awarded a $50,000 prize. The two players who lost the most were weighed live on the finale. Poppi Kramer from New Jersey narrowly edged out Matthew McNutt from Maine to win the $50,000, losing 50.43% of her start weight, versus Matthew's 48.09% loss. (Note: Jaron and Adrian were counted as players eliminated from the ranch, and thus did not compete for the at-home $50,000.)

In the table below, entries highlighted in yellow lost a percentage of weight commensurate with the least of those remaining at the ranch (in week 8, 17%), according to the latest data. The contestants who returned to the ranch as of week 8 are highlighted in orange.

Name	State	Height	Starting BMI	Finishing BMI	Start Weight	Week								Finale	Weight Lost	Pct. Lost
Name	State	Height	Starting BMI	Finishing BMI	Start Weight	1	2	3	4	5	6	7	8	Finale	Weight Lost	Pct. Lost
John Turner	Arizona	5'11"	49.7	35.3	356	332	322	314	308	305	302	303	298	253	103	29.0%
Jaron Tate	Arkansas	6'2"	above	above	323	306	295	284	276	270	266	252	248	163	160	49.5%
Stacie Farr	Colorado	5'6"	43.3	31.5	268	259	254	257	252	248	246	244	238	195	73	27.2%
Chris Smith†	Connecticut	6'0"	49.8	43.8	367	360	353	347	350	341	340	340	340	323	44	12.0%
Timothy Clausen	Delaware	5'6"	43.3	24.9	268	254	248	240	235	232	225	218	216	154	114	42.5%
Angie Moore	Georgia	5'3"	42.7	31.2	241	237	224	223	215	212	212	212	205	176	65	27.0%
Elisha Purdy	Hawaii	5'3"	39.1	34.5	221	217	214	203	200	200	200	199	199	195	26	11.8%
Linda Houseman	Idaho	5'4"	36.7	27.3	214	205	197	194	192	190	189	186	182	159	55	25.7%
Katherine Smith	Illinois	5'6"	40.7	32.4	252	244	238	235	231	230	227	227	226	201	51	20.2%
Steve Pilchen	Iowa	5'10"	41.9	34.6	292	285	284	282	278	273	270	265	265	241	51	17.5%
Alyssa Brockert	Kansas	5'8"	40.0	37.3	263	263	255	253	251	248	256	256	248	245	18	6.8%
Jamie Dean Lucas	Kentucky	6'4"	49.9	28.6	410	394	384	374	367	356	346	338	340	235	175	42.7%
Sabrina O'Neil	Louisiana	5'5"	32.6	26.6	196	195	188	184	183	180	175	173	174	160	36	18.4%
Matthew McNutt	Maine	6'4"	44.6	23.1	366	346	330	323	315	308	293	294	285	190	176	48.1%
Kally Fox	Michigan	5'5"	47.6	38.8	286	283	277	272	271	269	264	261	259	233	53	18.5%
John Weatherford	Mississippi	6'2"	39.4	29.9	307	300	293	285	283	280	282	279	273	233	74	24.1%
Mark Monaco	Montana	5'9"	43.4	29.4	294	282	273	268	264	256	250	242	242	199	95	32.3%
Adrian Kortesmaki	North Dakota	5'3"	above	above	227	215	206	199	193	190	183	178	174	169	58	25.6%
Evelyn Garcia	Nebraska	5'4"	46.3	41.2	270	263	259	258	253	250	249	251	251	240	30	11.1%
Joscelyn Cook	Nevada	5'3"	37.4	31.9	211	209	204	210	199	194	188	184	189	180	31	14.7%
Walter "Wally" Bressler	New Hampshire	6'3"	49.7	35.2	398	384	375	365	360	354	335	334	334	282	116	29.1%
Poppi Kramer†	New Jersey	5'2"	42.4	21.0	232	221	216	212	206	201	193	190	189	115	117	50.4%
Mitzi McCaleb	New Mexico	5'7"	40.1	31.8	256	251	250	244	242	238	235	231	233	203	53	20.7%
Ken Canion	North Carolina	6'2"	41.7	30.8	325	312	306	298	294	290	286	286	281	240	85	26.2%
Nikki Myers	Ohio	5'4"	40.2	25.6	234	229	225	221	218	215	213	205	202	149	85	36.3%
Jason Ramsey	Oklahoma	6'3"	44.1	32.9	353	338	330	326	318	313	305	303	301	263	90	25.5%
Tim Thomas	Oregon	6'0"	54.7	45.3	403	389	380	375	376	373	369	366	365	334	69	17.1%
Valerie Robinson	Pennsylvania	5'6"	39.7	31.8	246	240	236	236	232	232	225	222	222	197	49	19.9%
Erin Jeffrey	Rhode Island	5'5"	40.3	27.5	242	234	229	222	218	218	214	203	204	165	77	31.8%
Latorria Ladd	South Carolina	5'5"	41.1	33.8	247	241	238	231	230	227	222	224	223	203	44	17.8%
Dru Van Kley	South Dakota	5'9"	34.4	29.5	233	225	218	211	209	207	208	208	200	200	33	14.2%
Virginia "Ginnie" Bourque	Vermont	5'7"	43.4	25.5	277	266	254	252	248	246	239	233	230	163	114	41.2%
Jennifer Kerns	Virginia	5'6"	43.6	26.1	270	258	250	244	241	236	229	223	222	162	108	40.0%
Christopher Blackburn	West Virginia	6'1"	43.0	29.2	326	324	318	310	312	303	291	292	293	221	105	32.2%
Kevin Theis	Wisconsin	5'9"	44.0	32.5	298	284	274	267	259	255	245	242	241	220	78	26.2%
Sarah Mitchell	Wyoming	5'8"	32.5	26.6	214	211	209	204	203	200	199	199	199	175	39	18.2%

== Voting history ==
Name	Week 1	Week 2	Week 3	Week 4	Week 5	Week 6	Week 7	Week 8	Week 9	Week 10	Week 11	Finale
Eliminated	Jen	Tiffany	Nelson	Melinda	Amy	Ken	Pam & Brian	Bobby	Marty	Adrian	Jaron	Finale
Erik	X	?	Nelson	?	Amy	X	X	Bobby	Marty	Adrian	Jaron	Biggest Loser
Kai	Jen	X	Wylie	X	X	Ken	UFP	Bobby	Wylie	Adrian	X	Finalist (X)
Wylie	Jen	X	Pam	X	X	Ken	?	?	X	?	Jaron	Finalist (X)
Heather	Jen	X	Wylie	X	X	Ken	?	X	Wylie	X	?	Finalist (X)
Jaron								Bobby	Marty	Heather	X	Eliminated Week 11
Adrian								Bobby	Marty	X	Eliminated Week 10	
Marty	X	?	X	Melinda	Erik	X	?	?	X	Eliminated Week 9		
Bobby	X	Tiffany	X	?	Amy	X	?	X	Eliminated Week 8			
Brian	X	Tiffany	X	Melinda	Amy	X	X	Eliminated Week 7				
Pam	?	X	Wylie	X	X	?	X	Eliminated Week 7				
Ken	Jen	X	Pam	X	X	Heather	Eliminated Week 6					
Amy	X	Tiffany	X	Melinda	Erik	Eliminated Week 5						
Melinda	X	Tiffany	X	Bobby	Eliminated Week 4							
Nelson	?	X	Pam	Eliminated Week 3								
Tiffany	X	Melinda	Eliminated Week 2									
Jen	Heather	Eliminated Week 1										

Immunity
X Below yellow line, unable to vote
X Not in elimination, unable to vote
? Vote not revealed
Eliminated or not in house
Last person eliminated before finale
Valid vote cast

- In Week 3, there was a tie between the red team, so Erik (for the blue team) cast a vote to send Nelson home.
- In Week 7, Kai and Erik decided to use the free pass that Kai earned at a temptation. That pass keep both Kai and Erik
  safe from elimination, which meant that the votes were not revealed, and Pam and Brian were automatically eliminated.

== Episodes ==
=== Week 1 ===
A new trainer, Kim Lyons, is brought onto the ranch to replace Jillian. 50 contestants are brought onto the ranch, one from each state; all of them work out while Bob and Kim watch. The two trainers select seven contestants each for their Blue and Red teams. The remaining 36 return home to work out; the man and the woman with the greatest percentage of weight lost will return to the ranch.

The Red Team wins the first challenge (an obstacle course), though the Blue Team wins the first weigh-in, with Brian being the Biggest Loser of the week. Jen (Minnesota) of the Red Team is the first contestant voted off the ranch.

=== Week 2 ===
After the vote, the Red Team says they are "dysfunctional", in contrast to the Blue Team, which is "united". Ken learns his 19-year-old son is in the critical care unit in the hospital.

The teams go to the beach, where they work out, eat, and sleep in tents. The contestants all resist the temptation to dig up sand castles and uncover either immunity or a high-calorie treat. The reward challenge involves teams building sand piles large enough for them to remove a flag hanging from a pole. The Red Team wins and is rewarded with letters from home and the right to choose which Blue Team member will sit out the next weigh-in.

The Red Team wins the weigh-in, and Marty is the week's Biggest loser. The Blue Team votes off Tiffany (Texas).

=== Week 3 ===
The teams go on a cruise on the Sapphire Princess. The reward challenge calls for contestants to deliver meals to different parts of the ship. As a surprise, family members are there to meet them, and the winning team gets to spend time with their family. The Red Team wins the challenge. Given the timing, it is likely that Heather Hansen became pregnant on this cruise, as she was five months pregnant at the finale.

The Blue Team handily wins the weigh-in., and Heather is the Biggest Loser for her team. The vote results in a tie, with the three men voting as a bloc for Pam, and the three women voting as a bloc for Wylie. The Blue Team therefore breaks the tie by voting off Nelson (Massachusetts).

=== Week 4 ===
Red Team morale is at a low point due to Nelson's eviction, and members refuse to work out. Instead, they sit around crying together while Kim tries to snap them out of it.

Kai wins an immunity challenge, receiving an immunity free pass for herself to use whenever she wants. The challenge had involved contestants eating plates of food, then stacking the plates in a pile, with the winner having their plate on top when the challenge ended.

The Red Team wins the next challenge, involving team members walking up "down" escalators until only one team is left. Pam is ultimately the last person standing, and wins $10,000 in addition to the right to select one member of the Blue Team to sit out the weigh-in.

The Red Team wins the weigh-in. Brian is the Biggest Loser for the week. The Blue Team votes off Melinda (Alabama).

=== Week 5 ===
The gym is "closed" this week, so contestants must exercise using makeshift materials and miscellaneous locations. Erik in particular is struggling this week, and spends some one-on-one time with Bob.

The Blue Team wins the reward challenge, which involves the two teams doing "The Wave" all the way around the stadium. That is, each team sits in a row, does a wave together, then each person moves one seat over, and the actions are repeated, for a total of 510 waves. Winners win $2500 in Starter Performance Gear. In the middle of the challenge, Ken stops due to pain. This is the first challenge the Blue Team wins.

The Red Team wins the weigh-in, and Brian is once again the Biggest Loser of the week. Amy (Maryland), the final woman on the Blue Team, is voted off to her surprise — her team members had told her they were going to vote off Erik, who had consistently not been losing a very large percentage of his weight.

=== Week 6 ===
The Red Team wins a 'guess the calories' challenge, and earn the right to pick which members of the Blue Team must train without a trainer for 72 hours (Erik and Bobby) and must eat out for 72 hours (Brian and Marty). The nine remaining contestants meet with Dr. Rob Huizenga and learn that their health has improved tremendously.

The Blue Team wins a reward challenge that involves three team members hoisting a fourth in a harness to hang each member's flag, in turn. The teams were neck-and-neck until the Red Team makes several errors. The Blue Team gets the right to pick a Red Team member to sit out the weigh-in, and also gets to choose if they want a gourmet meal from the BelAge hotel, or a workout in their pool. They choose the meal, while the Red Team works out in the pool.

The Blue Team wins the weigh-in, and Kai is the week's Biggest Loser. The Red Team votes off Ken (Washington).

=== Week 7 ===
The contestants are informed that the Red Team and Blue Team will be split up into duos made up of one Red and one Blue member. In a contest, Wylie wins the right to decide how to split up the teams. The duos are: Wylie/Marty; Brian/Pam; Kai/Erik; and Bobby/Heather. Wylie asks to be trained by Bob.

Brian and Pam win the reward challenge, which involves holding up a long metal pole. Dropping the pole ignites a ring of fire. Their reward is a satellite phone call home.

At the weigh in, Brian/Pam and Kai/Erik fall below the yellow line. Erik gained three pounds in order to force the use of Kai's immunity pass, since he could only take advantage of it while partnered with Kai. At the elimination, no vote is necessary as Kai uses the immunity pass, forcing the elimination of Brian/Pam (California/Indiana). The two depart amidst many tears from the other contestants.

The contestants are informed of a twist — the men and women who had not been chosen by the trainers in the first episode have been training at home and the man and woman with the highest percentage of weight loss will be returning to the ranch. This is greeted with anger by the contestants who have been on the ranch.

=== Week 8 ===
This week was shown in a 2-hour episode.

Three women and three men come back to the ranch to be weighed, with the man and woman who have lost the greatest percentage returning to the ranch as a duo: Jaron and Adrian win, with Adrian having lost the greatest percentage of anyone, including those on the ranch, and Jaron being the second biggest loser. All of the other contestants make a pact to get Jaron and Adrian out as soon as they can. Adrian is assigned to train with Kim and Jaron with Bob. Adrian has a problem with the way Kim trains and complains about it, while Bob tests Jaron's strength and Jaron decides that Kim might be a better trainer.

Part 1 of the challenge is to guess how many calories a plate of food is, and the winner of the challenge gets to assign one ton of something (water jugs, dumbbells, bricks, and tires) to each team and they must transfer the ton from one platform to another. Wylie and Marty win the first part, and assigned weights to Bobby and Heather, bricks to Jaron and Adrian, and tires to Erik and Kai, leaving water for themselves. Wylie and Marty win the challenge and get a 42-inch plasma TV and a year's subscription to Netflix. The other teams decide to finish the challenge, with the exception of Adrian and Jaron, who have the most difficult things to move.

At the weigh-in Heather gains 4 pounds, causing her and Bobby to fall below the yellow line. Heather reveals that she threw the weigh-in because she thought that Bobby was a threat and was banking on the other players eliminating Bobby. Bob tries to tell Bobby to stay in, but Bobby seems to still be leaning towards wanting to go home. Jaron and Adrian vote for Bobby and in a surprise twist Kai and Erik vote for Bobby. Bobby (Tennessee) is eliminated.

=== Week 9 ===
Adrian, frustrated that she and Jaron would be chosen to be lowered on their bikes first because they joined later on, took the old tone with Caroline. Kai wins immunity.

Votes came down to Erik's to reveal the tie breaker. Seeing Marty as his biggest threat, and wanting to win the grand prize, Erik shocked everyone when he voted off the only other remaining member of Bob's blue team. Marty (Missouri) was eliminated

=== Week 10 ===
Bob found out that Erik voted off Marty and he was very angry, saying that he worked so hard to build up a team and it meant nothing to Erik. Erik explained how it is a game and at first it was only about losing weight, but now he sees the finish line.

In the challenge, the contestants competed in the first ever Biggest Loser Derby. They had to carry weights with the exact pounds they lost each week on their bodies, and drop them off one by one onto color-coded barrels representing their weeks on the ranch. Once rid of all the weights it became a foot race to the finish. Wylie took an early lead, but one of his weights fell off his barrel and he had to go back, causing him to lose his lead. The race came down to Adrian and Jaron, with Jaron winning by a hair. The prize was a trip for his wife of 7 years to come to the ranch for a day and night.

At the weigh in, everyone pulled large numbers except a defeated Adrian who lost 2 pounds. She had a breakdown over the frustration that she was having trouble getting over the same hump as when she tried to lose weight in high school, and then her friends told her that she would probably always be a "chunky" person. Kim pulled Adrian aside and tried to instill hope, saying that is not true and she has built a very athletic body and she will continue to drop the pounds in time if she continues with the hard work.

The original ranch contestants finally got to rid of a "newcomer" when they voted to keep Heather and Adrian (North Dakota) was eliminated. Jaron was the only one not to vote for Adrian, staying true to the gray team. Wylie's vote was not revealed because even if he voted for Heather it would bring it to a tie and Adrian would automatically be eliminated because she had the lowest percentage of weight loss for the week.

=== Week 11 ===
Kim tells Heather that she is not working as hard as she can, and Heather curses her out and says she is trying her best and cannot do more. They storm away from each other, and Kim returns to the gym. Kim pulls Kai aside to give her a pep talk about pushing as hard as possible all the way to the end, and congratulating on already significantly changing her life. Kai promises to give Kim her all for the duration of her time at the ranch. Bob goes for a run with his only remaining contestant, telling Erik that he inspires him as well as others, and he can definitely win the whole game.

The contestants get to train Bob and Kim for a day, and try to push them to the limits in cardiovascular and strength exercises, then the trainers face off in a gymnastics competition out on the lawn. Suzy and Matt Hoover returned to the ranch to talk to the contestants about their experiences after the ranch when they rejoin their regular lives.

The contestants compete in their last challenge of the season, the first ever Biggest Loser triathlon. They did a 200-yard swim across the lake, a 5-mile bike ride around the dam, and a 1.5-mile foot race to the finish line. Wylie fell behind early on, but all the contestants slowed their speed and waited in the water for him to catch up. The blue team then did the bike ride as a team, cheering each other on the whole way. Bob bikes with Erik, and the trainers also joined the contestants for the final run. Heather power-walked the race, showing Kim she was working hard, and they were able to patch things up. Wylie led the contestants to give Caroline a big hug even though they were all soaking wet from the triathlon.

Dr. Huizenga returned with test results for Erik. He is no longer diabetic and has no need for insulin or constant blood sugar testing

At the weigh-in, Kai and Jaron fell below the yellow line, even though they lost 4 and 6 pounds respectively. Jaron (Arkansas) is eliminated. He says he understands they voted to be loyal to Kai, and it is exactly how it is supposed to be. Friends and family come first, above all else.

The final four is set: Kai, Wylie, Heather (all Red) and Erik (Blue)

=== Week 12 (Finale) ===
Updates from the at-home players are announced: 9 lost over 100 pounds, Linda Houseman from Idaho got married, and Nikki Meyers from Ohio completed a half-marathon. The two finalists out of the 36 at-home players are Poppi Kramer from New Jersey and Matthew McNutt from Maine. Poppi started at a size 22 and is now a size 2. She took the at-home prize of $50,000 awarded by 24-hour fitness with a 50.43% weight loss, and ending at 115 lbs. Matthew had a weight loss of 48.09%, coming in a close second. Amy went from size 22 to a size 10.

Jennifer kicked off the eliminated players' weigh-ins with a 100-pound loss. Tiffany, Nelson, and Melinda fell significantly short, and then Amy came in 1 pound shy of taking the lead from Jennifer. Ken weighed-in next and passed her with a 44.97% loss, only to be quickly passed by Brian who came in at 50.65% loss. Bobby, Marty, Adrian, and Jaron were not able to pass him, although Jaron fell only a few pounds shy. Brian wins the $100,000 prize for the eliminated contestants awarded by thebiggestloserclub.com.

The Final 4 contestants return after 3 1/2 months away from the ranch. Erik was tempted with fast food and cigarettes at home, but overcame promising he would cross the finish line for once in his life. Heather worked hard at home, but gained weight occasionally and had to stay focused to overcome the frustration. Wylie avoided temptations completely because he was afraid that indulging at all could lead to a snowball effect, and he would end up eating entire pizzas, for example. He made it down to a size 32 pants and excited to show off his new body at home on Miami beach. Kai was tempted to go out drinking and partying with her friends, and it took a big toll on her workouts. After nights of partying she was not able to properly work out, and decided it was best to sacrifice all that for her overall weight loss goals. She fit into a size 8 jeans, the first time she can remember in her life fitting into a single digit size. Heather announces she is 5 months pregnant and therefore had to withdraw from the competition and will not be weighing in at the finale. She is gifted a dream nursery. Erik's friend John Baker was in the audience. His wife met John online and Erik has been helping and motivating John to lose weight on his own at home.

All 50 contestants initially weighed in at a total of 14,384 pounds. Their goal was to lose 4,000 pounds as a whole. They lost 4,281 total, surpassing their goal. Having been the biggest loser the final week on the ranch, Erik got to choose the weigh-in order. He had Kai go first, Wylie go second, and saved himself to weigh-in last. The third place prize of $25,000 went to Wylie with a total loss of 129 pounds, 42.02% of his starting weight. The second place prize of $50,000 went to Kai with a total loss of 118 pounds, 45.04% of her starting weight. She lost more than any other female in the history of The Biggest Loser. The Biggest Loser of the season is Erik Chopin, who wins the grand prize of $250,000 awarded by Jello. Erik started at 407 pounds, and ended at 193, netting a total loss of 214 pounds. He won by losing 52.58% of his starting weight. Erik's wife and two daughters celebrated by joining him on stage.

== Aftermath ==
Before Season 4, a special episode revisited past contestants to see if they kept the weight off. Except for Season One's Andrea, none had. Poppi, the at-home winner, gained the least, at 9.4% of her lost weight.

- Marty regained 21 of the 146 pounds he lost to weigh in at 240. He had also gained a fiancée, when he proposed to fellow contestant Amy on-air. They are now married and their first child was born in July 2009.
- Erik, the Biggest Loser of Season Three, regained 122.
- Pam regained 8 of 68 pounds to weigh 187.
- Poppi regained 11 of 117 pounds to weigh 126.
- Wylie regained 32 of 129 pounds to weigh 210.
- Brian, although not featured on the show, was included in the official Biggest Loser website. Having regained 47 of the 156 pounds originally lost, his 30.1% regain was the largest of those shown.

Erik, the biggest loser of season 3, appeared on The Oprah Winfrey Show to confess to the world that he gained back 122 pounds and now weighs 315 lbs.

A second "Where Are They Now" special aired on November 25, 2009. It featured contestants from the first seven seasons. Contestants Marty & Amy, and winner Erik were featured. Erik, who lost a record-breaking 214 pounds by the finale, was revealed to have gained 175 pounds back. But, Erik is aiming to lose this weight and Bob has invited him to the season 9 finale to weigh-in.

Poppi Kramer, winner of the thirty-six at home prize died July 26, 2018.
