= Valley Torah High School =

Orthodox Jewish high school in Valley Village, California

Location
- 12517 Chandler Blvd; Valley Village, California 91607; United States
- 34.168950°N 118.406045°W

Information
- Type: Independent, Yeshiva
- Religious affiliation: Chofetz Chaim
- NCES School ID: 00081953
- Grades: 9–12
- Enrollment: 250 (2020-2021)
- Student to teacher ratio: 7.3
- Website: www.vths.org

Valley Torah High School is an Orthodox Jewish high school located in Valley Village, California. The school has two separate divisions (in different buildings and locations): a Boys Division, and a Girls Division. The current Rosh Yeshiva is Rabbi Avraham Stulberger.

Valley Torah is hashkafically aligned with the Chofetz Chaim school of thought, which is a subset of Litvishe Haredi Judaism rooted in the Musar movement of 19th-century Lithuanian Jewry. The high school is part of the Freelance League.

== Athletics ==
=== Basketball ===
The Valley Torah Wolfpack won the 2011 Division 6AA CIF basketball championship, becoming the first Jewish school in Southern California to ever earn a CIF title, and the only orthodox Jewish school to do so.

The Wolfpack have also won three national Jewish tournaments: Memphis Cooper, Glouberman, and the Red Sarachek Tournament at Yeshiva University. They are the only Jewish school to accomplish all three feats.

Ryan Turell attended and played as a shooting guard on the varsity basketball team at the school. Playing for the high school, as a junior in 2016-17 he averaged 25.3 points per game, and as a senior in 2017-18 he averaged 34.3 points per game. In 2018, he received a McDonald's All-American Game nomination, and was California Interscholastic Federation (CIF) Division IV State Player of the Year and First Team Division IV.

== Girls' Division ==
The girls' branch of the school is located on 12003 Riverside Drive, 91607. Previously led by master menaheles Sheindy Gross, it is now directed by Yael Wakslak Rosenberg. Gross left Bnos Devorah High School in the middle of a school year in order to join Valley Torah Girls' Division in 2014, where she stayed until 2022.

== Notable alumni ==
- David Draiman (born 1973), lead singer for the band Disturbed.
- Leah Gottfried (born 1991), Orthodox Jewish actress and filmmaker.
- Ami Horowitz (born 1973), conservative documentary filmmaker and activist.
- Ryan Turell (born 1999), basketball player in the Israeli Basketball Premier League.
