= Elitzur Shomron =

אליצור שומרון Elitzur Shomron
- Leagues: Israeli National League
- Founded: 2018
- Arena: Yeshiva Amit Hall
- Capacity: 520
- Location: Brukhin, Shomron Regional Council, Israel
- Team colors: Blue and White
- Head coach: Yair Gvirtz
Home	Away

Elitzur Shomron (Hebrew: אליצור שומרון) is a professional basketball club based in Shomron, Israel. The club is currently a member of the Israeli National League, the second tier. The club represents Israeli settlements in the northern West Bank.

== History ==
The club was founded in the 2010s, and until the 2019/20 season the club played in the leagues that are below the Liga Artzit level.

In the 2019–20 season the team led the Liga Alef table, losing only one game. Eventually the season was cancelled due to the COVID-19 pandemic, and Elitzur was promoted to Liga Artzit for the first time.

In the 2020–21 season the team played in Liga Artzit Group North, and finished fifth in Group North.

In the 2021–22 season the team finished first in the regular season in Group North and advanced to the playoffs. In the Quarter-final Elitzur beat Hapoel Emek Hefer 2–1 in a best-of-three playoff. In the Semi-final Elitzur faced Hapoel Acre/Mateh Asher and Elitzur won 2–1 on aggregate. In the final series Elitzur faced Hapoel Kfar Saba. Elitzur won 2–1 on aggregate, and promoted to the Israeli National League for the first time.

In the 2024-25 season the team finished the league in 12th, a position that was supposed to send Elizur Shomrom back to Liga Artzit. However, the team took advantege the disbandment of Hapoel Kfar Qasem to retain its place in the national league.

Until the promotion to the Israeli National League, Elitzur played in Kfar Tapuach, a West Bank settlement under the Shomron Regional Council. The arena in Kfar Tapuach contains 500 seats and does not meet the standards that the Israeli Basketball Association set for arenas of teams that participate in the Israeli National League. After their promotion, they played their home games in Leader Arena, which is located in Ganei Tikva until the construction of their new home hall in Bruchin was completed. At the beginning of the 2025/26 season they moved to play in Bruchin.

== Players ==
=== Current roster ===
Note: Flags indicate national team eligibility at FIBA-sanctioned events. Players may hold other non-FIBA nationalities not displayed.

Elitzur Shomron roster
Players
Coaches

Pos.	No.	Nat.	Name	Ht.	Age
PG	2	(United States)	McClain, Kavion	1.75 m (5 ft 9 in)	25 – 1 January 2001
G	3	(Israel)	Hitkes, Rom	1.90 m (6 ft 3 in)	21 – 22 July 2005
F	4	(Israel)	Hershko, Lior	2.01 m (6 ft 7 in)	18 – 24 July 2008
G	5	(United States)	Delaney, Paul	1.88 m (6 ft 2 in)	40 – 30 August 1986
PG	7	(Israel)	Amiel, Ari	1.89 m (6 ft 2 in)	18 – 22 January 2008
SG	9	(Israel)	Rachlin, Alon	1.95 m (6 ft 5 in)	19 – 12 May 2007
G	13	(Israel)	Cohen, Assaf	1.87 m (6 ft 2 in)	20 – 13 March 2006
F/C	14	(Israel)	Bash, Eitan	2.00 m (6 ft 7 in)	23 – 28 June 2003
G	16	(Israel)	Adavi, Amit	1.91 m (6 ft 3 in)	23 – 17 April 2003
C	21	(United States)	Mitchell, Makhi	2.08 m (6 ft 10 in)	26 – 31 January 2000
F	32	(Israel)	Avidan, Niv	2.01 m (6 ft 7 in)	22 – 7 May 2004
G	69	(Israel)	Hachamo, Matan	1.92 m (6 ft 4 in)	22 – 17 December 2003
F	77	(United States)	Turell, Ryan	2.01 m (6 ft 7 in)	27 – 3 February 1999

Head coach

- (Israel) Yair Gvirtz

Assistant coach(es)

- (Israel) Yotam Razinski
- (Israel) Yuval Duannis

Legend

- (C) Team captain
- Injured

- Roster
Updated: 2026 September 1
