= The Biggest Loser season 2 =

The Biggest Loser
- Season 2
- No. of episodes: 12

Release
- Original network: NBC
- Original release: September 13 – November 29, 2005

Season chronology
- ← Previous; Season 1 Next → Season 3

The Biggest Loser season 2 is the second season of the NBC competitive reality television series entitled The Biggest Loser. The second season premiered on September 13, 2005, and like season one features overweight contestants who compete by trying to lose the most weight. The show is hosted by comedian Caroline Rhea, with Bob Harper and Jillian Michaels joining as the two personal trainers.

The contestants were divided into two teams: men in red and women in blue, with each team assigned to their own personal trainer of the opposite sex. Each week, the team which had the lowest percentage of total weight-loss was required to vote out one member of their own team. In Season 1, most pounds lost determined who won. Not percentage of total weight- loss.

Nick did not attend the finale.

The show concluded November 29, 2005, when Matt was declared "The Biggest Loser", winning $250,000. Seth was awarded $50,000 for his second-place finish, and Suzy was awarded $25,000 for third. Of the non-finalists, Pete had lost the highest percentage of weight and received the $100,000 prize.

== Season highlights ==
- The contestants were divided into male and female teams with trainers of the opposite sex.
- Season 2 introduced immunity for the contestant who lost the most weight on the losing team.
- Total percentage weight-loss was used to determine the winning team each week (as opposed to number of pounds lost used in Season 1).
- In episode 7, the blue and red teams were disbanded, and four new teams of couples were formed. Three of the teams consisted of one man and one woman, and one team consisted of two men.
- In episode 9, the teams of two were disbanded, and each contestant had to compete as an individual.

== Participants ==
Contestant	Team	Status
Matt Hoover, 28, Marion, Iowa	Red Team	Biggest Loser
Seth Word, 24, Salinas, California	Red Team	Finalist
Suzy Preston, 29, Des Moines, Washington	Blue Team	Finalist
Andrea Overstreet†, 28, Placentia, California	Blue Team	Eliminated Week 11
Jeff Levine, 43, Hillsborough, New Jersey	Red Team	Eliminated Week 10
Shannon Mullen, 29, Revere, Massachusetts	Blue Team	Eliminated Week 9
Mark Yesitis, 36, Campbell, California	Red Team	Eliminated Week 8
Pete Thomas, 36, Ypsilanti, Michigan	Red Team	Eliminated Week 7
Jen Kersey, 24, Des Moines, Iowa	Blue Team	Eliminated Week 6
Suzanne Mendoca, 30, Franklin Square, New York	Blue Team	Eliminated Week 5
Ryan Kelly, 26, Jefferson City, Tennessee	Blue Team	Eliminated Week 4
Nick Gaza, 39, Glendale, California	Red Team	Eliminated Week 3
Kathryn Murphy, 28, Bloomington, Minnesota	Blue Team	Eliminated Week 2
Ruben Hernandez, 37, Culver City, California	Red Team	Eliminated Week 1

== Weigh-ins ==
Contestant	Age	Height	Starting BMI	Ending BMI	Starting weight	Week												Weight lost	Percentage lost
Contestant	Age	Height	Starting BMI	Ending BMI	Starting weight	1	2	3	4	5	6	7	8	9	10	11	Finale	Weight lost	Percentage lost
Matt	28	5'10"	48.6	26.1	339	311	304	300	290	279	279	262	254	266	240	230	182	157	46.31%
Seth	24	6'1"	38.4	22.2	291	270	262	258	250	243	233	233	232	219	211	204	168	123	42.27%
Suzy	28	5'4"	39.0	22.7	227	207	205	201	196	191	186	182	180	170	166	161	132	95	41.85%
Andrea	28	5'6"	35.5	23.4	220	209	204	202	198	193	191	185	184	179	176	173	145	75	34.09%
Jeff	43	6'1"	48.8	28.6	370	352	344	340	326	316	305	294	284	270	267		217	153	41.35%
Shannon	29	5'3"	45.5	26.4	257	242	240	236	229	221	218	212	208	200			149	108	42.02%
Mark	36	5'10"	51.4	27.7	358	335	325	318	308	291	287	273	271				193	165	46.09%
Pete	36	6'5"	47.6	25.6	401	379	371	367	350	338	325	318					216	185	46.13%
Jen	24	5'7"	40.6	26.8	267	248	244	244	234	224	221						176	91	34.08%
Suzanne	30	5'6"	37.0	22.9	229	213	209	206	199	191							142	87	37.99%
Ryan	26	5'7"	35.2	23.0	225	207	205	200	195								147	78	34.67%
Nick	40	5'9"	51.1	X	346	318	308	305									Did not attend		
Kathryn	28	5'5"	36.1	33.4	217	202	201										201	16	7.37%
Ruben	37	6'3"	34.7	24.6	278	261											197	81	29.14%

Teams
Member of Bob's team
Member of Jillian's team
Game
Last person eliminated before finale
Winners
$250,000 Winner (among the finalists)
$100,000 Winner (among the eliminated contestants)
BMI
Normal (18.5 – 24.9 BMI)
Overweight (25 – 29.9 BMI)
Obese Class I (30 – 34.9 BMI)
Obese Class II (35 – 39.9 BMI)
Obese Class III (greater than 40 BMI)

=== Weight loss history ===
Contestant	Week											
Contestant	1	2	3	4	5	6	7	8	9	10	11	Finale
Matt	−28	−7	−4	−10	−11	0	−17	−8	+12	−26	−10	−48
Seth	−21	−8	−4	−8	−7	−10	0	−1	−13	−8	−7	−36
Suzy	−20	−2	−4	−5	−5	−5	−4	−2	−10	−4	−5	−29
Andrea	−11	−5	−2	−4	−5	−2	−6	−1	−5	−3	−3	-28
Jeff	−18	−8	−4	−14	−10	−11	−11	−10	−14	−3	-50	
Shannon	−15	−2	−4	−7	−8	−3	−6	−4	−8	-51		
Mark	−23	−10	−7	−10	−17	−4	−14	−2	-78			
Pete	−22	−8	−4	−17	−12	−13	−7	-102				
Jen	−19	−4	0	−10	−10	−3	-45					
Suzanne	−16	−4	−3	−7	−8	-49						
Ryan	−18	−2	−5	−5	-48							
Nick	−28	−10	−3	X								
Kathryn	−15	−1	0									
Ruben	−17	-64										

=== Percentage loss history ===
Contestant	Week											
Contestant	1	2	3	4	5	6	7	8	9	10	11	12
Matt	−8.26%	−2.25%	−1.32%	−3.33%	−3.79%	0.00%	−6.09%	−3.05%	+4.72%	−9.77%	−4.17%	−20.87%
Seth	−7.22%	−2.96%	−1.53%	−3.10%	−2.80%	−4.12%	0.00%	−0.43%	−5.60%	−3.65%	−3.32%	−17.65%
Suzy	−8.81%	−0.97%	−1.95%	−2.49%	−2.55%	−2.62%	−2.15%	−1.10%	−5.56%	−2.35%	−3.01%	−18.01%
Andrea	−5.00%	−2.39%	−0.98%	−1.98%	−2.52%	−1.04%	−3.14%	−0.54%	−2.72%	−1.68%	−1.70%	-16.18%
Jeff	−4.86%	−2.27%	−1.16%	−4.12%	−3.07%	−3.48%	−3.61%	−3.40%	−4.93%	−1.11%	-18.73%	
Shannon	−5.84%	−0.83%	−1.67%	−2.97%	−3.49%	−1.36%	−2.75%	−1.89%	−3.85%	-25.50%		
Mark	−6.42%	−2.99%	−2.15%	−3.14%	−5.52%	−1.37%	−4.93%	−0.75%	-28.78%			
Pete	−5.49%	−2.11%	−1.08%	−4.63%	−3.43%	−3.85%	−2.15%	-32.08%				
Jen	−7.12%	−1.61%	0.00%	−4.10%	−4.27%	−1.34%	-20.36%					
Suzanne	−6.99%	−1.88%	−1.44%	−3.40%	−4.02%	-25.65%						
Ryan	−8.00%	−0.97%	−2.44%	−2.50%	-24.62%							
Nick	−8.09%	−3.14%	−0.97%	X								
Kathryn	−6.91%	−0.50%	0.00%									
Ruben	−6.12%	-24.52%										

=== Total overall percentage of weight loss (Biggest Loser on Campus) ===
Bold denotes who has the overall highest percentage of weight loss as of that week

Contestant	Week										
Contestant	1	2	3	4	5	6	7	8	9	10	11
Matt	−8.26%	−10.32%	−11.50%	**-14.45%**	−17.70%	−17.70%	−22.71%	**-25.07%**	−21.53%	**-29.20%**	**-32.15%**
Seth	−7.22%	−9.97%	−11.34%	−14.09%	−16.49%	**-19.93%**	−19.93%	−20.27%	−24.74%	−27.49%	−29.90%
Suzy	**-8.81%**	−9.69%	−11.45%	−13.66%	−15.86%	−18.06%	−19.82%	−20.70%	−25.11%	−26.87%	−29.07%
Andrea	−5.00%	−7.27%	−8.18%	−10.00%	−12.27%	−13.18%	−15.91%	−16.36%	−18.64%	−20.00%	−21.36%
Jeff	−4.86%	−7.03%	−8.11%	−11.89%	−14.59%	−17.57%	−20.54%	−23.24%	**-27.03%**	−27.84%	
Shannon	−5.84%	−6.61%	−8.17%	−10.89%	−14.01%	−15.18%	−17.51%	−19.07%	−22.18%		
Mark	−6.42%	−9.22%	−11.17%	−13.97%	**-18.72%**	−19.83%	**-23.74%**	−24.30%			
Pete	−5.49%	−7.48%	−8.48%	−12.72%	−15.71%	−18.95%	−20.70%				
Jen	−7.12%	−8.61%	−8.61%	−12.36%	−16.10%	−17.23%					
Suzanne	−6.99%	−8.73%	−10.04%	−13.10%	−16.59%						
Ryan	−8.00%	−8.89%	−11.11%	−13.33%							
Nick	−8.09%	**-10.98%**	**-11.85%**								
Kathryn	−6.91%	−7.37%									
Ruben	−6.12%										

== Elimination voting history ==
Contestant	1	2	3	4	5	6	7	8	9	10	11	Finale
Eliminated	Ruben	Kathryn	Nick	Ryan	Suzanne	Jen	Pete	Mark	Shannon	Jeff	Andrea	Finale
Matt	Ruben	X	Nick	X	X	X	Pete	Mark	Shannon	Jeff	Andrea	Biggest Loser
Seth	Ruben	X	Nick	X	X	X	Jeff	Mark	Shannon	Andrea	Andrea	Finalist (X)
Suzy	X	Kathryn	X	Shannon	Suzanne	Jen	Jeff	Mark	Shannon	Jeff	X	Finalist (X)
Andrea	X	Kathryn	X	Shannon	Suzanne	Jen	Pete	X	X	X	X	Eliminated Week 11
Jeff	Ruben	X	Seth	X	X	X	X	Andrea	Andrea	X	Eliminated Week 10	
Shannon	X	Kathryn	X	Ryan	Suzanne	Jen	Pete	Mark	X	Eliminated Week 9		
Mark	Ruben	X	Nick	X	X	X	Pete	X	Eliminated Week 8			
Pete	Ruben	X	Nick	X	X	X	X	Eliminated Week 7				
Jen	X	Shannon	X	Ryan	Shannon	Andrea	Eliminated Week 6					
Suzanne	X	Kathryn	X	Ryan	Shannon	Eliminated Week 5						
Ryan	X	Kathryn	X	Shannon	Eliminated Week 4							
Nick	Ruben	X	Seth	Eliminated Week 3								
Kathryn	X	Jen	Eliminated Week 2									
Ruben	Jeff	Eliminated Week 1										

Immunity
X Below yellow line, unable to vote
X Not in elimination, unable to vote
? Vote not revealed
Eliminated or not in house
Valid vote cast

== Episodes ==
=== Week 1 ===
Fourteen overweight contestants arrive at the ranch. They are weighed, measured, and divided into two teams, a Red Team and a Blue Team. The Red Team consists of all the men and is trained by Jillian, while the Blue Team consists of all the women and is trained by Bob.

The contestants' first challenge is in a nose diving airplane. Their goal is to collect as many balls as they can before time runs out, while floating in a zero-gravity atmosphere. The Red Team wins 115–81. As a reward, the men get to hinder any member of the Blue Team with a 5-pound weight disadvantage. This player is ultimately Suzanne.

The men weigh-in and lose 157 pounds collectively. It comes down to Suzy, who must lose more than 19 pounds. She loses 20 pounds, and wins the weigh-in for the Blue Team. Season 2 introduces that the player on the losing team with the highest percentage of weight loss will have immunity. Matt is this player for the Red Team. The Red Team criticized Ruben for not working out as hard after losing the weigh-in; he is then voted off. At home, Ruben has lost 63 lbs since he first arrived at the ranch.

=== Week 2 ===
The players face their first temptation. Contestants have 15 minutes. If they eat what's inside a food platter they can read the letter from home made for them. Despite Mark trying to get Shannon to participate, everyone resists.

The trainers say in the workout before the challenge that the week will focus on balance, speed, and agility. The challenge ultimately is walking across a big beam over water. The Blue Team sits out Kathryn due to an injured foot. The first team to get all of their members across first will win letters from home. The Blue Team win, with Dr. Jeff still on the beam. Jeff, despite the challenge being over, finishes his walk across. An emotional Blue Team opens the letters from home. Also, as a reward, the girls get an extra day to work out before the weigh-in.

At the weigh-in, the Red Team win with most of the men losing about 8 pounds, while the women had lower numbers. After their win, Jillian angrily confronts Nick for cooking a 2000 calorie steak. Andrea has the immunity for highest percentage weight loss on the losing team. Everyone except herself voted for Kathryn. Since the show, Kathryn has done kick-boxing and now has lost a total of 34 lbs.

=== Week 3 ===
The food is gone, and whenever the contestants want to eat, they must order out. Jillian comes into the gym and apologizes for "blowing up" after Matt says that the five members (all except Nick) need her more than anything. The trainers then teach the contestants how to order out in the real world.

The players face another temptation. Whoever drinks the most 40 calorie milkshakes will get free meals for the rest of the week, and get to choose one other person to have the same reward. Suzy is the only one who participates, drinking 48 milkshakes. She chooses Ryan to join her for the healthy free meals.

This week's challenge is to run on a moving train and bring medicine balls throughout the train. The men win and get phone calls home the next morning. Pete and Ryan nearly pass out and get taken to the hospital. Later that night, the two return to the ranch.

At the weigh-in, Ryan needs to lose 5 pounds to win and pulls through for her team with a 5-pound weight loss. The Red Team loses and is sent to the elimination room for the second time. The Red Team vote is a close one, with Nick and Jeff voting for Seth while Pete, Mark, and Seth vote for Nick. Matt casts the deciding vote to send Nick home with a 4–2 vote. After the vote Nick refuses to say goodbye to his teammates with a negative distant attitude and gives them the cold shoulder during his exit, causing Matt to feel less guilty about his decision to vote him off. Nick's weight loss since the Biggest Loser is unknown by his choice.

=== Week 4 ===
This week the teams learn they are headed to Las Vegas, the 'ultimate city of temptation'. Both teams are excited yet nervous due to the temptations of gambling and the food. The contestants enjoyed fine dining and some gambling; Matt lost out in Black Jack while Suzanne won $1600 on the slots.

For this week's temptation the Dealer offers the teams a chance to play for money with cards ranging from $1 to $5000. The catch was if the player chooses to play for the money, they must sacrifice training with their trainer until the next Weigh-in. Seth and Mark of the Red team chose to participate with their teammates' blessing and Matt taking the reins to train them. Shannon, Jen, and Suzanne of the Blue team chose to participate as well. Each participant drew a card face down and flipped it over one by one. Seth won $1000, Mark won $2500, Shannon won $1000, Suzanne won $2500, and Jen won $1000. After the first round the Dealer made them a second offer – playing a game of high-low with a chance of doubling their money, but if they lose they still lose their trainer. Seth, Mark, and Jen chose to walk with their winnings while Shannon and Suzanne chose to take the offer. Shannon and Suzanne both guessed correctly and doubled their winnings (2k for Shannon and 5k for Suzanne). Both teams told their trainers the news and neither Bob nor Jillian were happy at all. On the Blue Team, a noticeable divide began to form between with the three members who sat out (Suzy, Andrea, and Ryan) against the three who participated (Shannon, Jen, and Suzanne).

At this week's challenge the teams learned each individual player must move gold bars that are equal to their individual weight from the water to a scale on the other side of the pool. The prize would be a chance to return to the casino once the remodel is fully complete in 2006 and they can bring a loved one. The winning team also chooses a member of the losing team to sit out the next weigh-in, without their weight counting towards their team's total percentage of weight loss. In a close competition the Red Team just edges out the Blue Team for the prize.

During the workouts Matt would be trained by Jillian, then use the same methods to train Mark and Seth. With their teammates training with Bob and leaving them behind, Jen, Shannon, and Suzanne trained with the guys under Matt's supervision.

The rift between the women was growing. The next morning Ryan and Suzanne have an argument over a comment Ryan made about having less teammates to train with her under Bob which greatly annoyed and hurt Suzanne. Shannon took offense to Ryan's comments that claimed Bob was happier without Shannon, Jen, and Suzanne (to which Bob denied) then told Shannon if she wants the drama she can keep it and he does not care. Shannon leaves while Bob stresses over how his Blue team was not a team at all due to the lack of unity and focus. Prior to the weigh-in, the Red Team showed great unity while the Blue Team clearly had no interest in cooperation.

At the weigh-in, the Red Team chose Jen to sit out of the team's total weight loss, which turned out to be a wise choice when Jen lost 10 lbs under Matt's training. Suzanne and Shannon each lost 7 lbs while Ryan, Suzy, and Andrea pull less than that each, with a total team weight loss of 28 lbs bringing them to −2.68%. The Red Team needed to lose 43 lbs to beat the Blue Team. Red Team lost 59 lbs with total a percentage of −3.73%.

Jen won immunity making her safe from elimination this week. At the Blue Team's elimination the rifts from earlier in the week resurfaced as the girls that sat out the Las Vegas temptation (Ryan, Suzy, and Andrea) voted for Shannon while the girls that participated in the temptation (Shannon, Jen, and Suzanne) voted for Ryan resulting in a 3–3 tie. Suzanne had the power to send Shannon home but instead chose to gamble after giving a short statement about some of her teammates (whom voted for Shannon) knowing a trick or two about manipulation and decided to roll the dice forcing a tie by siding with Jen and Shannon. By the rules of The Biggest Loser the Red Team had the power to send home any member of the Blue team except Jen. Mark stated the Red Team chose to send home one of the lighter women in the house that works very hard in the Gym, but is the center of conflict in the house which both teams have had enough of, thus the Red team chose to send Ryan home. Since the show, Ryan has lost a total of 55 lbs and has been working out 6 times a week.

=== Week 5 ===
After Ryan's elimination, Andrea and Suzy were visibly upset with the results. Suzanne offered her condolences to them but in reality she was pleased her plan to take Ryan out worked assuming Ryan to be the glue between Suzy and Andrea. Andrea and Suzy both saw through Suzanne's fake sympathy, knowing she was trying to manipulate the situation.

At the next temptation both teams are surprised to see their trainers on campus presenting them their temptation for the week – a pop quiz after a double cheese burger, onion rings, fries, and a shake were revealed to them. They had to figure out how many calories were on the tray food, coming to a united decision as a team, and for every calorie they were off with their estimate they had to do a stair on the stair master. The prize was a 1-day trip to Universal Studios to enjoy themselves and hit the rides without waiting in line. The women guess the total calorie count for the food to be 4,249 while the men guessed 2,950. The men won only missing the correct answer by 116 calories while the women were way off by 1415 calories, which meant 1415 stairs for the Blue Team and 116 for The Red Team. Had the Blue Team went with Shannon's answer of 2800 they would have won the temptation and only had to do 34 stairs. The Red Team enjoyed their day off.

To help motivate the Blue Team, Bob invited Andrea from Season 1's Blue team to give them a pep talk to help raise their spirits and regain focus.

This week's challenge required each team to search a warehouse full of fridges. Some had tempting fatty foods while others had healthy sugar-free Jello. The first team to find all five fridges with Jello wins. The prize was videos from home. The girls finally came together and defeated the guys, winning the videos from home. Bob was thrilled to learn his team worked together and won.

During the weigh-in, the men lost 56 lbs collectively, giving a percentage loss of 3.74%. The women needed to lose 40 lbs to win but fall just short with 36 lbs, even with strong numbers from Shannon (8 lbs), Suzanne (8 lbs), and Jen (10 lbs). Their total percentage weight loss was 3.41% making it the closest weigh-in in the last few weeks.

Suzanne tried to get the team together to decide the proper way to vote at the next elimination; whether to go with personalities or focus on who has been pulling the bigger numbers. Andrea quickly calls out Suzanne for her antics in the game and tells her she does not trust her since everything Suzanne had done has only been for her own personal gain. At the vote Suzanne opted to cast her vote for Shannon claiming had it not been for her, Shannon would have been sent home and felt Shannon owed her a favor but was not willing to return it. Andrea and Shannon voted to send Suzanne home based on wanting to keep the team strong and peaceful. Suzy cast the deciding vote to send Suzanne home, thus eliminating Suzanne with a 3–1 vote without revealing Jen's vote.

After Suzanne left, Caroline asked what happened. Shannon answered with that she chose to send Suzanne home due to Suzanne being known to fly off the handle and the team felt the need to bond more and Suzanne was more of a disruption of team unity. At home, Suzanne has lost 70 lbs since she arrived at the ranch and was 30 lbs away from reaching her goal of losing 100 lbs.

=== Week 6 ===
The day after Suzanne's elimination, Andrea felt her team took a risk with them keeping her. Jillian is concerned that since Mark has been working much harder in workouts, that he is not eating like he should be.

Next, there is a temptation. The contestants come into a room with a sign that says, "Ignore your diet just for today, you have a one in three chance to play, there is a $2300 prize for you at stake, all you have to do is eat this slice of cake." After everybody resists, a note gets slipped under the door saying, "Because none of you have given in, we're going to give you one more chance to win, removing the middle box is all you have to do to increase your chances to one in two." Still none of the contestants give in to the temptation. They go into a room and find Bob on a game-boy bike. He then tells them had they competed in the temptation, they would have won it. Jen was having a hard time on her team and associates with Mark, though they can't associate with members of the opposite team.

The trainers say the challenge will be a physical challenge that will be uphill. At the challenge, Caroline says that only one person from each team will represent them, and the winner would split $5000 with their team and choose member of the other team to sit out of the next weigh-in. The first person to climb up and down a huge flight of stairs 10 times (2280 steps) would win, but the teams would choose who was playing on the other team. The men pick Andrea for the girls and the girls pick Mark for the men. Andrea wins the challenge for her team.

At the weigh-in, the Blue Team decide to sit out Seth. The Blue Team loses a total of 13 pounds (1.57%). Matt storms out of the weigh-in after losing no weight. The Red Team needs to lose more than 19 pounds to win the weigh-in, and loses 28 pounds (2.29%).

The next day, Jillian confronts Matt about his diet in the past week, and how he would binge eat in the middle of the night.

At elimination, Jen voted to send Andrea home, but the other members voted to send Jen home, so Jen was eliminated. Before Jen left, she told the team that the guys were not out to get them. After Jen leaves, Caroline tells the remaining girls that she does not want to see them there next week. At home, Jen has lost a total of 72 lbs.

=== Week 7 ===
The week starts with the Red Team waiting to see who got eliminated. Once they found out it was Jen, all of them storm out of the room. Mark feels the girls are eliminating the wrong people and cusses them out thinking it was just a popularity contest. Shannon does not feel comfortable living in the house because of what Mark said to her.

Everyone goes into the elimination room with Caroline, who tells them that the teams are dissolved and they would be split into duos (3 male female duos, one male duo). Whichever duo loses the lowest percentage of weight would be up for elimination. Caroline asks Mark what all the tension in the house was about, he then goes on to tell her that he deals with "dirtbags" at his job and didn't feel like dealing with them, and it made him sick to think he would be paired with one. The girls start crying, saying they feel disgusted by what was said. Caroline tells everyone that now was an opportunity to see the best in each other. She tells them one person would be picking the teams in a temptation.

Everyone goes into a room with trays and a note that says, "choose wisely, only one gives you the power, the others are full of calories". Everyone except Shannon and Jeff participate. Seth gets 2 donuts, Suzy gets Twinkies, Andrea gets a hot dog, Matt gets carrot sticks, Mark gets a mini pizza, and Pete gets the power to choose. Pete pairs Shannon and Matt, Andrea and Mark, Seth and Suzy, and Jeff with himself. Everyone seems satisfied with their teams The trainers were surprised to find the new duos, and decide to work with everyone and not just their teams.

This week's challenge took place at a beach, and one member of the duo would go to the ocean and fill a bucket of water and put it in any competitor's bucket, the other would hold it. All the girls and Jeff filled buckets, the others held them. The winning duo would get surfing lessons in Hawaii, and immunity. Pete was the first to let go, them Mark, Matt, and Seth wins it for him and Suzy. Matt later finds out his uncle had died.

At the weigh-in, Andrea and Mark lose 20 pounds (4.18%). Shannon and Matt lose 23 pounds (4.63%). Pete and Jeff lose 18 pounds (2.86%) and lose the weigh-in. Jeff felt he should go home because he felt he had reached a lot of his goals, and that Pete could have chosen anyone to be his duo, but chose him. At elimination, Caroline is surprised when everyone expresses how much they like their duos and how they have bonded. Matt and Shannon vote for Pete, Seth and Suzy vote for Jeff, so Mark and Andrea cast the final vote to eliminate Pete. At home, Pete lost a total of 137 lbs. His wife, Pam also lost a total of 50 lbs and are starting their plans on having their own family.

=== Week 8 ===
Jeff is disappointed when the house voted to keep him there and Pete went home. The players walk outside to find a container that says, "dig in to find your temptation". They all dig in to find a note that says, "congratulations, you all get makeovers from the Christophe salon in Beverly Hills". All the contestants got makeovers, a new outfit, and a photo shoot. The women were featured in Prevention Magazine.

At the challenge, each duo had to ride a bike up a hill. Behind the bikes was a member of everyone's family (Matt's dad, Suzy's sister, Seth's wife, Jeff's daughter, Shannon's daughter, Mark's wife, and Andrea's husband). The winning duo won immunity and got to spend the evening with their family member. Seth and Suzy won.

At the weigh-in, Jeff lost 10 pounds (3.40%). Shannon and Matt lost 12 pounds (2.53%). Andrea and Mark lost 3 pounds (0.66%) pushing them below the yellow line.

At elimination, Jeff votes for Andrea, Seth and Suzy vote for Mark, and Matt and Shannon cast the deciding vote to eliminate Mark. Matt gets emotional when voting for Mark because he thought it would ruin their friendship. Matt wrote a letter to Mark saying how sorry he was, and at the end of the episode, Mark forgives him. At home, Mark has lost 130 lbs.

=== Week 9 ===
Everyone goes into the weigh in room with Caroline, who tells them that the duos are dissolved and they would be individuals. The two people who are below the yellow line (having the lowest percentage cumulative weight loss) will be up for elimination. Two people get a showdown, while one contestant gets a new look to surprise everyone.

At the challenge, each player had to stand on those platforms and jump while the bars will swing around the contestants. The last contestant won immunity and the fitness bike. Matt won.

In the weigh-in, Matt gain 12 pounds (+4.72). Andrea lost 5 pounds (2.72). Seth lost 13 pounds (5.60%). Suzy lost 10 pounds (5.56%). Shannon lost 8 pounds. Jeff lost 14 pounds. Andrea and Shannon pushing her below the yellow line.

At the elimination, Suzy votes for Shannon, Seth votes for Shannon, Jeff votes for Andrea, and Matt votes for Shannon. Since arriving at the ranch, Shannon has lost a total of 87 lbs.

=== Week 10 ===
Bob is disappointed when the house voted to keep Andrea or Suzy here and Shannon went home.

At the challenge, players had to grab one of those poles and hold on tight and rise into air and leaving the player above the water, the contestant wins by hangs on the longest wins. Andrea won the challenge. But there was no Immunity up to grabs. The winner get a night stay at a fancy-part hotel and give two pounds.

At the weigh-in, Suzy lost 4 pounds (2.35%). Seth lost 8 pounds (3.65%). Andrea lost 3 pounds (1.68%) and Jeff lost 3 pounds (1.11%) pushing them below the yellow line. Matt lost 26 pounds (9.77%) becoming this week's Biggest Loser.

At the elimination, Matt & Suzy votes for Jeff. At home, Jeff is reduced further to 240 lbs.

=== Week 11 ===
The final four (Matt, Seth, Suzy and Andrea) are greeted by blue team trainer, Bob (much to his relief) that Andrea was still here. The men reminisce about their time at the ranch and the progress they’ve made in terms of fitness. They are so much more physically active and capable. They can run, and they feel healthy. Jillian arranges for Matt's old wrestling coach to come visit and also brings in one of his former wrestling buddies to spar with. The final four was greeted by their last challenge – They open their safes to find they are filled with bags of quarters. The bags are equal in weight to what they’ve lost. Win the challenge, keep the quarters. In the weigh-in, Suzy who lost 5 pounds (3.01%) and Andrea who lost 3 pounds (1.70%) fell below the yellow line while Seth who lost 7 pounds (3.32%) and Matt, the Biggest Loser of the Week lost 10 pounds (4.17%). In the elimination ceremony, Matt and Seth voted for Andrea. Thus, leaving Matt, Seth and Suzy as the three finalists.

=== Week 12 (Finale) ===
In the finale, Caroline Rhea announces that before the finalists (Matt, Seth and Suzy) are introduced, all the show's previously eliminated contestants (Ruben, Kathryn, Ryan, Suzanne, Jen, Pete, Mark, Shannon, Jeff and Andrea) returned, showcasing their newly fit bodies. Nick is the only eliminated contestant who did not attend the finale (He is also the only contestant who chose not to attend the finale without quitting).

== After the show ==
Matt and Suzy later appeared on season three of The Biggest Loser in America, and also flew to Australia, along with Seth, to make an appearance on the first season of the Australian version of the show.

== Did They Keep the Weight Off? ==
Prior to the start of season four, a special episode was shown revisiting past contestants to see if they kept the weight off. Only Pete was weighed, but Matt and Suzy appeared in a video clip. Matt and Suzy are now married and have two children.

Although, like everyone else featured except Season One's Andrea, most had gained weight since his finale; Pete was the only one to take his shirt off to show that he had kept up his muscular tone. Weighing in at 241 pounds, he had gained 25 pounds since the end of Season Two.

NBC has announced that there will be another "Did They Keep The Weight Off" special, which will feature more than 40 Contestants from all 7 seasons so far. Those confirmed to appear in the episode include: Finalists Matt and Suzy, and eliminated contestants Jeff and Pete. There may be more, however these have been the only ones to be confirmed to appear.
