= Dave Kufeld =

American basketball player

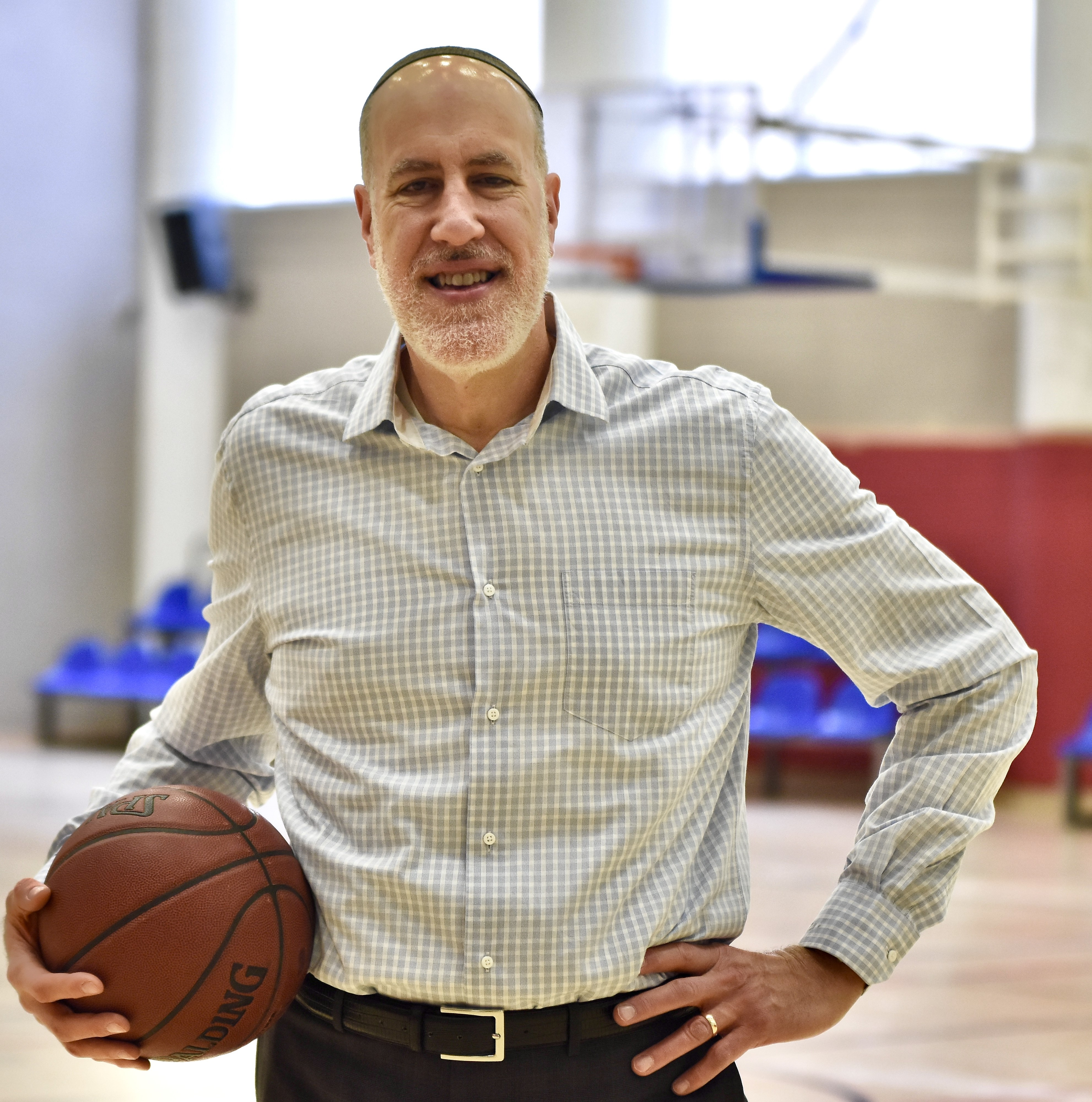
- Kufeld in 2022

Personal information
- Born: September 27, 1958 (age 68) New York City, New York, U.S.
- Listed height: 6 ft 8 in (2.03 m)

Career information
- High school: Manhattan Talmudical Academy (New York, New York)
- College: Yeshiva (1976–1980)
- NBA draft: 1980: 10th round, 205th overall pick
- Drafted by: Portland Trail Blazers
- Playing career: 1980–1982
- Position: Center
- Number: 24

Career history
- 1980–1981: Maccabi Ironi Ramat Gan

Career highlights
- All-American (1980); 2× Division III rebounding leader (1979, 1980)
- Stats at Basketball Reference

David Kufeld (Hebrew: דייב קופלד; born September 27, 1958) is an American-Israeli former professional basketball player. He became the first Orthodox Jew selected in the NBA draft when the Portland Trail Blazers drafted him in the 10th round of the 1980 draft.

== Early life ==
Kufeld was born in New York City and grew up in Great Neck, New York, on Long Island. He attended the Manhattan Talmudical Academy and played on the school's varsity basketball team for all four years of high school. He served as team captain and made the league's All Star team.

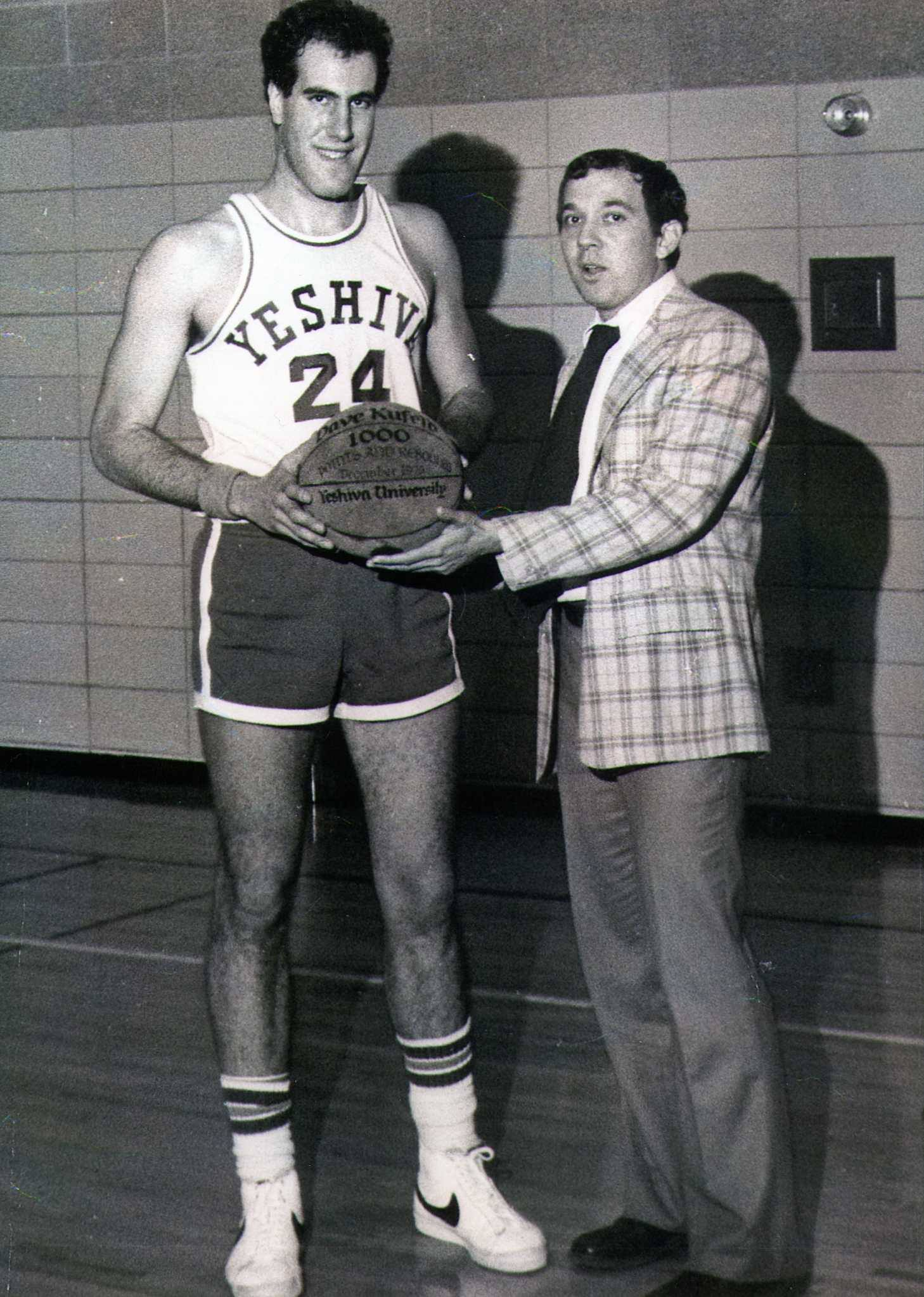

== College basketball career ==
After high school, Kufeld attended Yeshiva University and played center for the Yeshiva Maccabees basketball team. The school had limited resources and Yeshiva did not have a gym or formal home court during his time there. Kufeld, who played for acclaimed coach Dr. Jonathan Halpert, led all NCAA Division III players in the country in rebounding for his junior and senior year (1978–79 and 1979–1980). For the 1978–1979 season as well as the 1979–1980 season he was the captain of the team. He was named to the All Conference Team of the Independent Athletic Conference (IAC) for all 4 years, and was All-ECAC in his junior year. In his senior year, he was named a Basketball Weekly All-American, and the Jewish Sports Review named him the National Jewish Player of the Year for Division II and Division III in 1979 and 1980. As of 2023, Kufeld is fifth all-time in Division III for rebounds per game.

Kufeld majored in Speech and Drama at Yeshiva, and served as Senior Editor of The Commentator, the student newspaper, and was a disc jockey on the college's radio station WYUR, the president of the Speech Club and an occasional actor and makeup artist for the Dramatics Society. Ahead of the 1980 NBA draft, he sent self-promotional packets to ten NBA teams. Kufeld represented the Borough of Manhattan in the 1979 Big Apple Games, and appeared as a "Face in the Crowd" in Sports Illustrated magazine in 1980. Anecdotes of his collegiate life as an athlete with varied interests were the subject of several stories covered by the national news wires.

College statistics
| Year | G | PPG | RPG | APG | FG% | FT% |
| 1976–77 | 21 | 16.6 | 11.5 | 1.6 | 51.1 | 68.3 |
| 1977–78 | 20 | 10.3 | 13.7 | 1.5 | 46.2 | 58.5 |
| 1978–79 | 20 | 17.7 | 17.8 | 1.4 | 57.1 | 66.7 |
| 1979–80 | 20 | 17.1 | 17.7 | 1.5 | 57.8 | 67.0 |
| Career | 81 | 15.4 | 15.1 | 1.5 | 53.4 | 65.8 |

== Professional basketball career ==
The Portland Trail Blazers selected Kufeld with the 211th pick in the 10th round of the 1980 NBA draft. The team's owner and president, Larry Weinberg, had reserved the final draft pick himself and selected Kufeld. Kufeld attended rookie camp with the rest of his draft class which included Kelvin Ransey, and Michael Harper (who both were signed by Portland), but at 6 ft 8 in (2.03 m) he was considered too small to play as a center in the NBA. After four days of rookie camp, Kufeld was cut.

If Kufeld had been signed to an NBA roster, as a shomer Shabbat Jew, he would not have been able to travel, practice, or play in games during the Jewish Sabbath (Friday night through Saturday night).

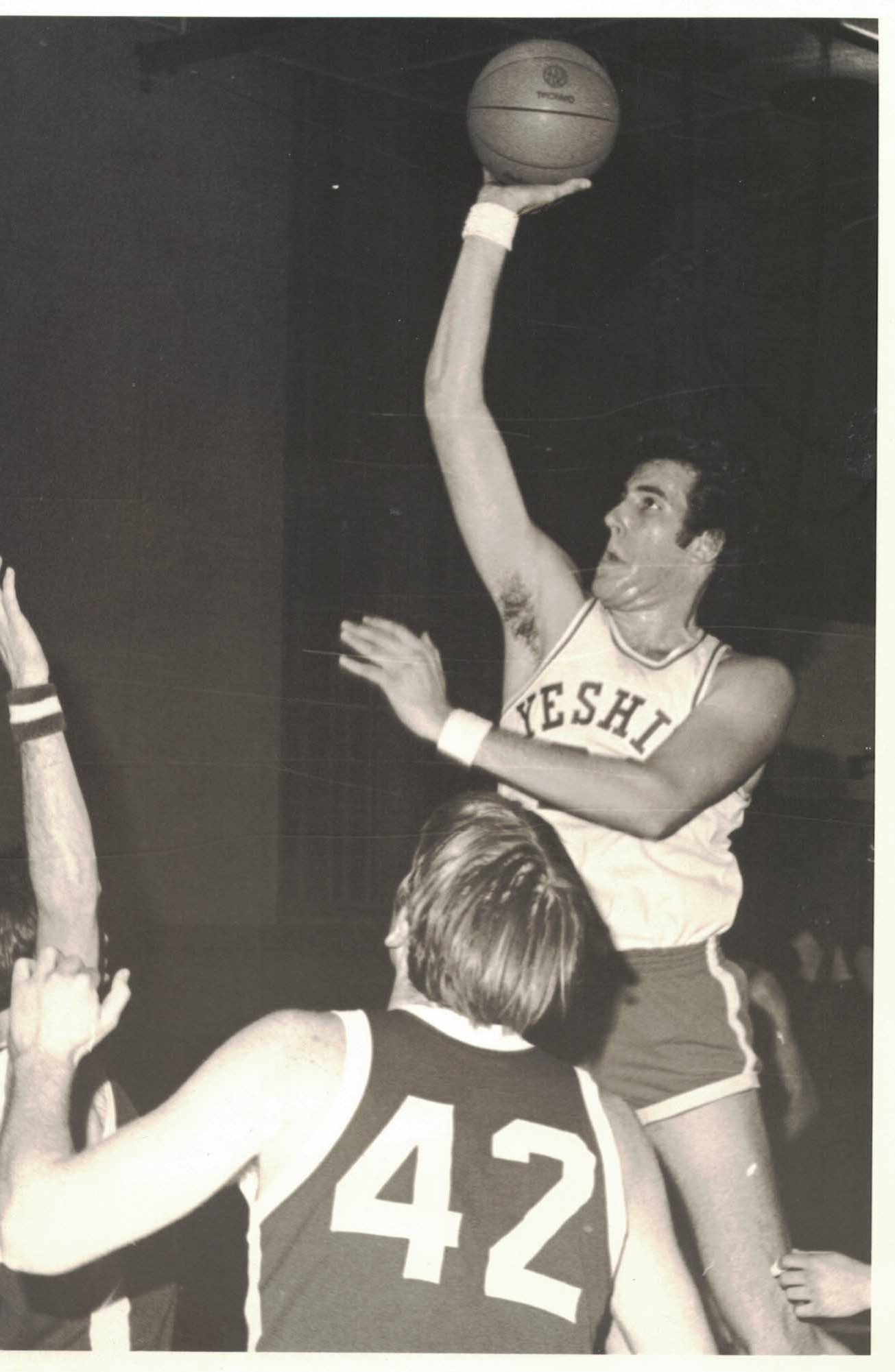

A description of Kufeld's inclusion in the NBA draft was included in acclaimed author and journalist David Halberstam's sequel chapter to his book "Breaks of the Game" published in Sport magazine. The book chronicled the Portland Trail Blazers' anti-climactic season after capturing the NBA title in the 1978–1979 season.

As the first anniversary of his being drafted approached, the New York Times contracted Kufeld to author a sports section op-ed article chronicling his experience as a draft pick from the most unlikely of backgrounds.

Kufeld signed with Maccabi Ironi Ramat Gan of the Israeli Basketball Premier League playing with Doron Jamchi (the leading Israeli-born player of his generation). Because Kufeld had not officially made aliyah to Israel, the team named him its designated foreign player, a spot that usually went to foreign non-Jews who were not eligible for Israeli citizenship under the Law of Return.

After returning from Israel, he continued playing for the "Uptowners" squad in the New York Summer Pro League (along such NBA and European veteran players as Dave Britton, Sam Worthen and Arnold Dugger, and squaring off against such pros as Daryl Dawkins, Marvin Barnes and Caldwell Jones), at the Holcombe Rucker Tournament and in the Eastern Professional Basketball League.

He played as a power forward in Long Island's Glen Cove League, with such teammates as Euro League legend Walt Szczerbiak, NBA All-Star Neal Walk, and the NBA's Tommy Emma.

Kufeld also represented the United States at the 1992 Pan American Maccabiah Games (as a 32-year-old playing with mostly 20-year-olds), in Montevideo, Uruguay (winning a gold medal) and played in the 1997 and 2001 World Maccabiah Games in Israel, as a Masters level athlete, playing for coaches as Dolph Schayes and the late Marty Riger.

== After basketball ==
In the 1990s, Kufeld founded (along with famed athlete and sports broadcaster Marty Glickman and Dr. Mike Cohen) and served as president of the Jewish Sports Congress. He served as head basketball coach of the Yeshiva University High School for Girls and then for the Yeshiva University Stern College for women, helping them achieve their first winning record. Active in the marketing, advertising and public relations fields since his college days (in both in-house corporate departments and at his own agency, The Kufeld Organization), Kufeld has been the marketing director of the Weitz & Luxenberg law firm in Manhattan for the last 25 years and very active in philanthropic causes.

Kufeld and his wife, Suri, had two children, who live in Israel. In 2019, Kufeld and his wife made aliyah and moved to Israel.

In 2019, Kufeld was inducted into the Yeshiva University's Athletic Hall of Fame. He was previously inducted into the Independent Athletic Conference Hall of Fame and was inducted into the Jewish Sports Heritage Association's Hall of Fame, in April 2024. In recognition of this latest honor, the Village of Great Neck has established Sunday, April 7 as "Dave Kufeld Day."

== See also ==
- Tamir Goodman, former American-Israeli Orthodox Jewish basketball player dubbed the "Jewish Jordan" in the early 2000s
- Ryan Turell, former Yeshiva University basketball star who was the first Orthodox Jew to be selected in the NBA G League draft
