= Makhi Mitchell =

American basketball player (born 2000)

- Mitchell with Maryland (#21)

No. 21 – Elitzur Shomron
- Position: Center
- League: Liga Leumit

Personal information
- Born: January 31, 2000 (age 26) District Heights, Maryland, U.S.
- Listed height: 6 ft 10 in (2.08 m)
- Listed weight: 240 lb (109 kg)

Career information
- High school: Jackson-Reed (Washington, D.C.)
- College: Maryland (2019–2020); Rhode Island (2020–2022); Arkansas (2022–2024)
- NBA draft: 2024: undrafted
- Playing career: 2024–present

Career history
- 2024: Sheffield Sharks
- 2025: Apaches de Chihuahua
- 2025: Astros de Jalisco
- 2025: Abejas de León
- 2025: Dar City
- 2025–2026: Maine Celtics
- 2026: Motor City Cruise
- 2026: Astros de Jalisco
- 2026–present: Elitzur Shomron

Career highlights
- CIBACOPA champion (2025)

Makhi Ahkim Mitchell (born January 31, 2000) is an American professional basketball player for Elitzur Shomron of the Liga Leumit. He played college basketball for the Maryland Terrapin, Rhode Island Rams, and Arkansas Razorbacks.

== College career ==
Mitchell began his college basketball career as a freshman with the Maryland Terrapins in 2019. He made his college debut on November 5, 2019, in a Maryland 95–71 win over Holy Cross. In his freshman year, he appeared in 12 games and averaged 3.0 points and 3.3 rebounds per game.

In 2020, Mitchell transferred to the Rhode Island Rams. With the Rams in his sophomore year he appeared in only seven games but emerged as a starter in his junior year, making 27 starts and averaging 9.9 PPG and 7.3 RPG.

In 2022, Mitchell transferred to the Arkansas Razorbacks. In his senior year in 2022–23, Mitchell started in 31 games for the Razorbacks and was a key member of the 22–14 team that went to the Sweet 16 at the 2023 NCAA tournament.

Mitchell concluded his college career in 2023–24, playing his 5th year in college with Arkansas. He averaged 8.6 PPG and 4.6 RPG while appearing in 33 games, starting 5. He ended his college career on March 14, 2024, with a 80–66 loss to South Carolina in the SEC tournament.

== Professional career ==
Mitchell went undrafted in the 2024 NBA Draft. He started his career with the Sheffield Sharks of Super League Basketball (SLB) in England, joining the team on a one-year deal for the 2024–25 season. Mitchell helped the Sharks to a strong start of the season, but left team in October to join the Sioux Falls Skyforce of the NBA G League for training camp. He was waived by Sioux Falls in November, before the start of the season.

In January 2025, Mitchell signed with the Apaches de Chihuahua of the Liga de Básquetbol Estatal de Chihuahua (LBE) in Mexico ahead of the 2025 LBE season. He averaged 20.7 points, 8.9 rebounds, and a league-best 2.0 blocks per game, and helped the team reach the LBE finals, where they lost in six games.

Mitchell subsequently joined the Astros de Jalisco of the CIBACOPA, joining the team in the middle of its 2025 CIBACOPA season. He averaged 11.7 PPG and 7.4 RPG in 25 games played, helping the Astros win the 2025 CIBACOPA title. Later that year, Mitchell signed with the Abejas de León of the Mexican LNBP. He averaged 13.1 PPG and 6.6 RPG in 14 games played. Mitchell also appeared in 2 games with Dar City of the Basketball Africa League, averaging 14.5 PPG and 8.5 RPG.

Mitchell joined the Maine Celtics for the 2025–26 season after a try-out. He made 15 appearances for Maine, averaging 4.0 points and 3.4 rebounds per game, and was waved in early January 2026. Mitchell then signed with the Motor City Cruise. He helped the Cruise win its first playoff game in team history.

In April 2026, Mitchell returned to the Astros de Jalisco for the second half of the 2026 CIBACOPA season.
