= Ryan Turell =

American-Israeli basketball player (born 1999)

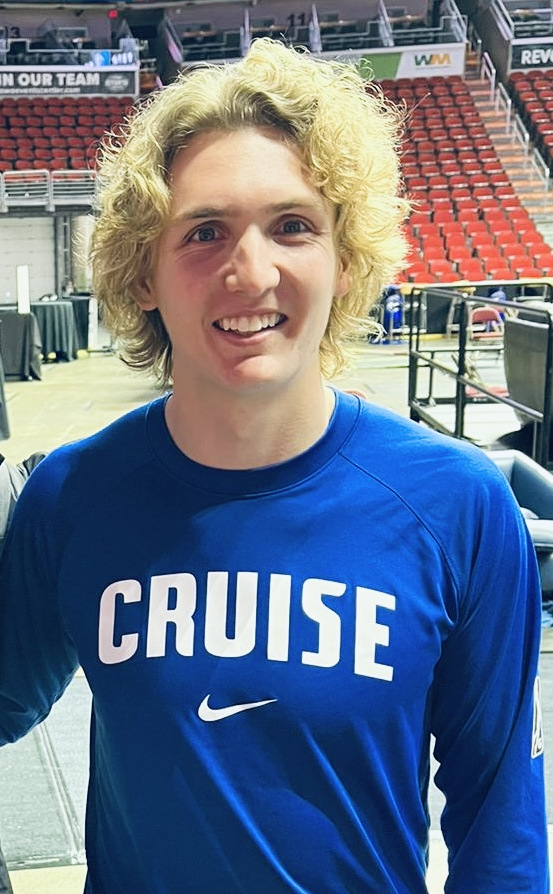

No. 77 – Elitzur Shomron
- Position: Small forward
- League: Liga Leumit

Personal information
- Born: February 3, 1999 (age 27) Valley Village, California, U.S.
- Listed height: 6 ft 7 in (2.01 m)
- Listed weight: 190 lb (86 kg)

Career information
- High school: Valley Torah (Los Angeles, California)
- College: Yeshiva (2018–2022)
- NBA draft: 2022: undrafted
- Playing career: 2022–present

Career history
- 2022–2024: Motor City Cruise
- 2024–2025: Ironi Ness Ziona
- 2025–2026: Hapoel Haifa
- 2026–present: Elitzur Shomron

Career highlights
- NABC D-III National Player of the Year (2022); 2× Skyline Player of the Year (2021, 2022)
- Stats at Basketball Reference

Ryan K. Turell (born February 3, 1999) is an American-Israeli professional basketball player for Elitzur Shomron of the Israeli Liga Leumit.

Turell was selected in the first round of the 2022 NBA G League draft by the Motor City Cruise, becoming the first Orthodox Jew selected in the G League draft.

== Early and personal life ==
Turell was born in the Los Angeles neighborhood of Valley Village, the youngest of three children of Brad and Laurel Turell (two sons and a daughter). According to a 2021 ESPN story, the Turell children "grew up in a household with twin focuses: basketball and Judaism". As a child, his father Brad had played basketball against future NBA player Kiki VanDeWeghe, in college he had played basketball as a guard at the University of California, Santa Barbara, and as an adult he had performed public relations work for VanDeWeghe. The elder Turells' later choice for their children's education had its roots in the journeys both took to Orthodox Judaism. Brad, who had been raised as a Reform Jew, began studying with an Orthodox rabbi in his late twenties, at the time intending only to learn more about Judaism, but he eventually embraced Orthodox Judaism. Laurel, the daughter of Southern Baptist evangelical singers, was dating Brad at the time. After she met Brad's teacher, she eventually chose to convert to Judaism, and became Orthodox at the same time as Brad.

Brad hired dribbling and shooting coaches for both his sons when Ryan was in kindergarten. The older son, Jack, went on to play basketball at Yeshiva University, an NCAA Division III school.

Ryan is a religious Orthodox Jew, keeps kosher, observes the Jewish Sabbath, and wears a yarmulke on his head—even while playing basketball. Turell said that if he were to play in the NBA he would play on the Sabbath, but would walk to games and practices scheduled for the Sabbath. He heard antisemitic slurs on the basketball court while playing both in high school and in college. He practices from the NBA three-point line, shooting daily until he sinks at least 300 three-point shots.

== High school career ==
Turell attended and played as a shooting guard on the varsity basketball team at Valley Torah High School, a Jewish school with a student body of 135. He also played for Earl Watson Elite, a premier Amateur Athletic Union (AAU) team. Playing for the high school, as a junior in 2016-17 he averaged 25.3 points per game, and as a senior in 2017-18 he averaged 34.3 points per game. In 2018, he received a McDonald's All-American Game nomination, and was California Interscholastic Federation (CIF) Division IV State Player of the Year and First Team Division IV.

Turell received several offers from NCAA Division I schools. However, late in his senior year of high school, by which time the family was living in another Los Angeles neighborhood, Sherman Oaks, Ryan surprised both of his parents when he told them that he would attend his brother's alma mater. Brad recalled, "I said, 'Why in the world would you want to go to Yeshiva?' And Ryan said, 'Why in the world did you send me to Valley Torah High School?'" In the same ESPN story, when Ryan heard his father's recalling of the incident, he added, "And Emek", referring to Emek Hebrew Academy, the Jewish day school he attended before Valley Torah.

== College career ==
In 2018, Turell began playing college basketball on the Yeshiva University Maccabees team. Yeshiva University is a small Jewish university in Washington Heights in New York City, with about 2,600 undergrads. Some nicknamed him "the Jewish Larry Bird." He led Yeshiva University to one of the longest winning streaks in NCAA Division III men's college basketball history, a 50-game streak that was broken in December 2021.

In 2018–19, as a freshman, Turell averaged 20.2 points (tops in the Skyline Conference), 5.0 rebounds, 3.5 assists, and 1.4 steals per game. He shot .539 from the field (3rd in the conference), .421 from three-point range, and .806 from the line (4th). He was named Skyline Conference Freshman of the Year, Skyline Conference All-First Team, D3hoops.com Atlantic Region Rookie of the Year, and Jewish Sports Review Second Team All-American.

In 2019–20, as a sophomore, he averaged 23.9 points (tops in the conference), 5.8 rebounds, 3.4 assists, and 0.8 steals per game. Turell shot .636 from the field (leading the conference), .462 from three-point range, and .795 from the line. He was named Skyline Conference Player of the Year, Skyline Conference All-First Team, D3hoops.com Atlantic Region Player of the Year, D3hoops.com All-America First Team, D3hoops.com All-Atlantic First Team, National Association of Basketball Coaches (NABC) All-Atlantic First Team, and NABC DIII All-America Second Team, and Jewish Sports Review First Team All-American.

In 2020–21, as a junior, in a season limited to seven games by the COVID-19 pandemic, Turell averaged 26.0 points, 8.3 rebounds, 3.0 assists, and 1.4 steals per game. Turell shot .512 from the field, .421 from three-point range, and .773 from the line. He was D3hoops.com All-Atlantic/Mid-Atlantic Player of the Year, D3hoops.com All-America First Team, and a Basketball Times Preseason All-American.

In 2021–22, as a senior, Turell averaged 27.1 points (leading all levels of college basketball), 5.5 rebounds, 2.7 assists, and 1.4 steals per game. He shot .587 from the field, .468 from three-point range, and .761 from the line. He was named NABC DIII National Player of the Year, NABC DIII All-America First Team, NABC All-District Atlantic First Team, NABC District 3 First Team, Skyline Conference Player of the Year for the second season in a row, and Skyline Conference All-First Team for the third time in his career, D3hoops.com Region 3 Player of the Year, and D3hoops.com All-America First Team for the third straight year.

== Professional career ==
=== Motor City Cruise (2022–2024) ===
In the 2022 NBA G League draft, the Motor City Cruise, the affiliate of the Detroit Pistons, selected Turell with the 27th pick in the First Round. Turell became the first Orthodox Jew selected in the G League draft.

In Turell's G-League debut during the regular season on December 27, 2022, he recorded a season-high 21 points, 2 rebounds and 1 steal as the Cruise fell 108 - 115 to the Capital City Go-Go. In his first season with the Cruise, Turell played in 31 of the team's 32 regular season games and averaged 4.0 points and 1.7 rebounds in 14.2 minutes per game. The Cruise would miss the playoffs that year with a 17 - 15 record.

On October 21, 2023, Turell signed with the Detroit Pistons, but was waived the same day. He rejoined the Cruise for the 2023–24 season.

For his second season with the Cruise, Turell played in fewer games total (23 compared to 31 in his first season) and averaged fewer minutes per game (11.9 down from 14.2) while averaging 5.0 points and 2.0 rebounds. In Turell's final game of the 2023 - 2024 season on March 29, 2024, he recorded a career-high 34 points while also grabbing 6 rebounds as the Cruise were defeated by the Raptors 905 104 - 109. The Cruise would miss the playoffs again with a 16 - 18 record.

=== Ironi Ness Ziona (2024–2025) ===
On July 2, 2024, Turell signed with Ironi Ness Ziona of the Israeli Basketball Premier League.

=== Hapoel Haifa B.C (2025–present) ===
On November 17, 2025, Turell signed with Hapoel Haifa B.C. of the Israeli Liga Leumit.

== See also ==
- List of select Jewish basketball players
- Dave Kufeld, the first Orthodox Jew selected in the NBA draft
