= Valley Village, Los Angeles =

Neighborhood in California, US

Valley Village
- Neighborhood
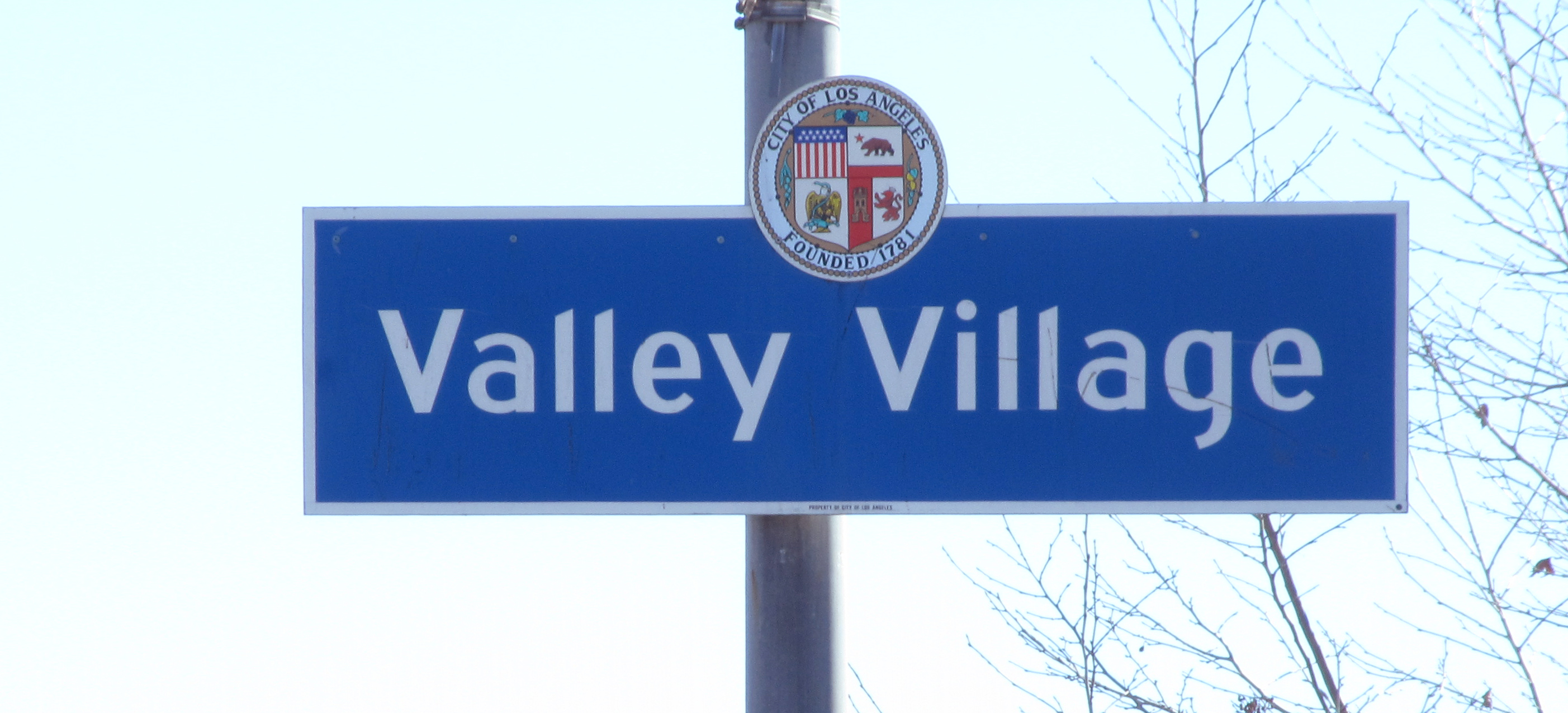
- Valley Village signage located at the intersection of Burbank Boulevard and Laurel Canyon

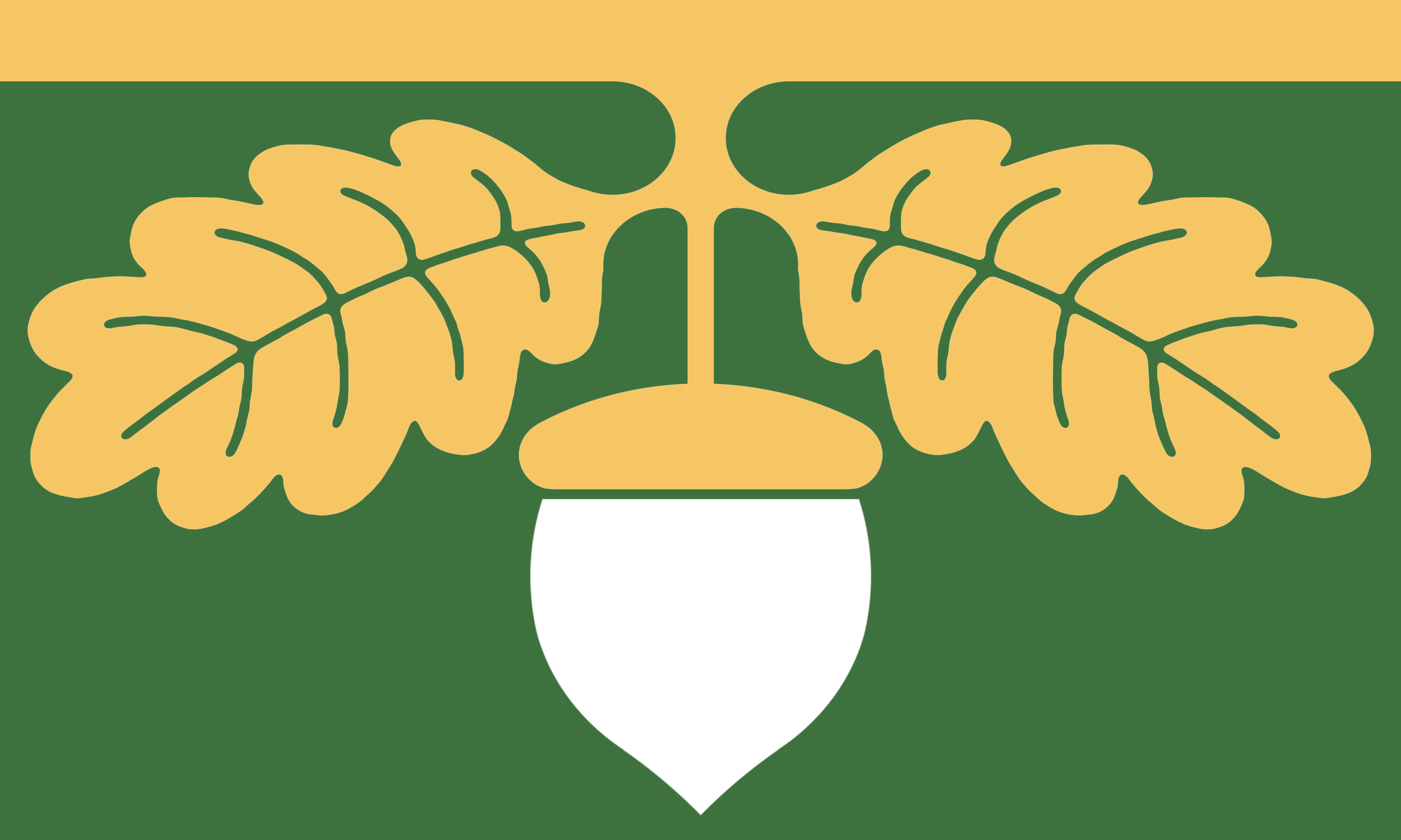
- Flag

- Location in the San Fernando Valley
- Coordinates: 34.16488°N 118.39650°W
- Country: United States
- State: California
- County: Los Angeles

Area
  - Total: 5.39 km^{2} (2.08 sq mi)

Population (2010)
  - Total: 24,330
  - Density: 4,514/km^{2} (11,690/sq mi)
- Time zone: Pacific
- ZIP Codes: 91401, 91423, 91601, 91602, 91607
- Area codes: 747, 818
- Website: myvalleyvillage.com

Valley Village is a neighborhood in the city of Los Angeles, located within the San Fernando Valley.

== History ==
=== Founding ===
According to Elke Garman, co-president of the Valley Village Homeowners Association in 1991, the history of Valley Village went back to the 1930s, when workers at nearby motion picture studios built houses there. The local post office on Magnolia Boulevard canceled all mail with a "Valley Village" postmark. It was, however, officially a section of North Hollywood.

On page 30 of his autobiography Endless Highway, David Carradine says:

The San Fernando Valley is a really hot, dry place in the summer. I spent most of my time in swimming trunks, sitting in the upper branches of a giant apricot tree that grew at the corner of the farm, eating apricots and stuffing my trunks full of them to take home.

In 1939, when we moved there, Valley Village was an isolated two-block town in the middle of miles and miles of orange and walnut groves, peach orchards, and cornfields. It was situated at what you might call the end of Los Angeles: the city, the county, and the idea. Across the street from the house was a dirt farm, usually in corn: acres and acres of it. After that, there were no more streets. The edge of the city.

In the other direction from the house was an empty lot; well, that's what we called it. It was actually a peach orchard.

=== Separation from North Hollywood ===
The idea of separating Valley Village from North Hollywood was brought into public light with a meeting of about 300 homeowners at Colfax Avenue Elementary School in December 1985, yet it wasn't until 1991 that Valley Village got seven new blue reflective markers from the city of Los Angeles to mark its borders.

Reporter James Quinn of the Los Angeles Times wrote that Valley Village no longer wanted to be associated with North Hollywood, "a community that has grown old, heavily Latino and crime-plagued," but, in the same article, Valley Village leader Tom Paterson was quoted as saying that the move "was more than an attempt to boost property values" and that it "had nothing to do with ethnic demographics." Rather, he said, "It was one economic level seeking to have its own identity." Quinn wrote that:

Houses along Valley Village's lushly landscaped, graffiti-free streets cost up to $800,000, and a two-bedroom, two-bath entry-level house will run $300,000, residents say. Elsewhere in North Hollywood, that same size entry-level house can be purchased for as little as $150,000, real estate agents say. And the cheaper house is likely to have an overgrown, dusty yard and to be in a neighborhood reeling from crime, with gang graffiti splattered on block walls and street signs.

=== "Stucco mountains" ===
In December 1985, some three hundred homeowners gathered at Colfax Avenue Elementary School to begin a campaign to head off development of what they called "stucco mountains" – continued construction of large apartments and office buildings in the area. Councilman Joel Wachs said he would support the drive, although he rejected the details of a proposed advisory panel for the area. He said a proposed panel of homeowners might overlook the concerns of renters and the need for rental housing. Residents complained about blocked views, parking problems and traffic congestion because of buildings as high as five stories next to their single-family homes.

The measure would not have banned construction but would have limited all new buildings to two stories and the square footage of commercial development to 1 1/2 times the size of the lot. The plan had the support of Valley Village resident Tom Paterson, president of the Valley Village Homeowners Association, but the opposition of, for one, Marvin Eisenman, an apartment-building owner who said it would not be fair to landowners who purchased property with the idea of developing it. It was touted as a temporary measure until city planners could conduct public hearings on new, permanent development limits. On September 17, 1986, the City Council approved the idea on a 10–2 vote, but less than a month later it reversed itself after heavy lobbying – by former Councilman Arthur K. Snyder, among others – and sent the ordinance back to committee, with the idea that it could be brought back with exemptions for areas where development had already occurred. Finally, substantially the same measure was approved by the council on a temporary basis with exemptions for two dozen properties in areas where there had already been substantial development, like the south side of Riverside Drive between Colfax Avenue and Laurel Canyon Boulevard.

Eventually, the Los Angeles city Planning Commission recommended that a three-story limit be adopted for the Valley Village area.

== Geography ==
=== City of Los Angeles ===
The boundaries of Valley Village as delineated by the Valley Village Neighborhood Council are Burbank Boulevard to the north, the Tujunga Wash to the west, the Ventura Freeway (U.S. Route 101) to the south and the Hollywood Freeway to the east.

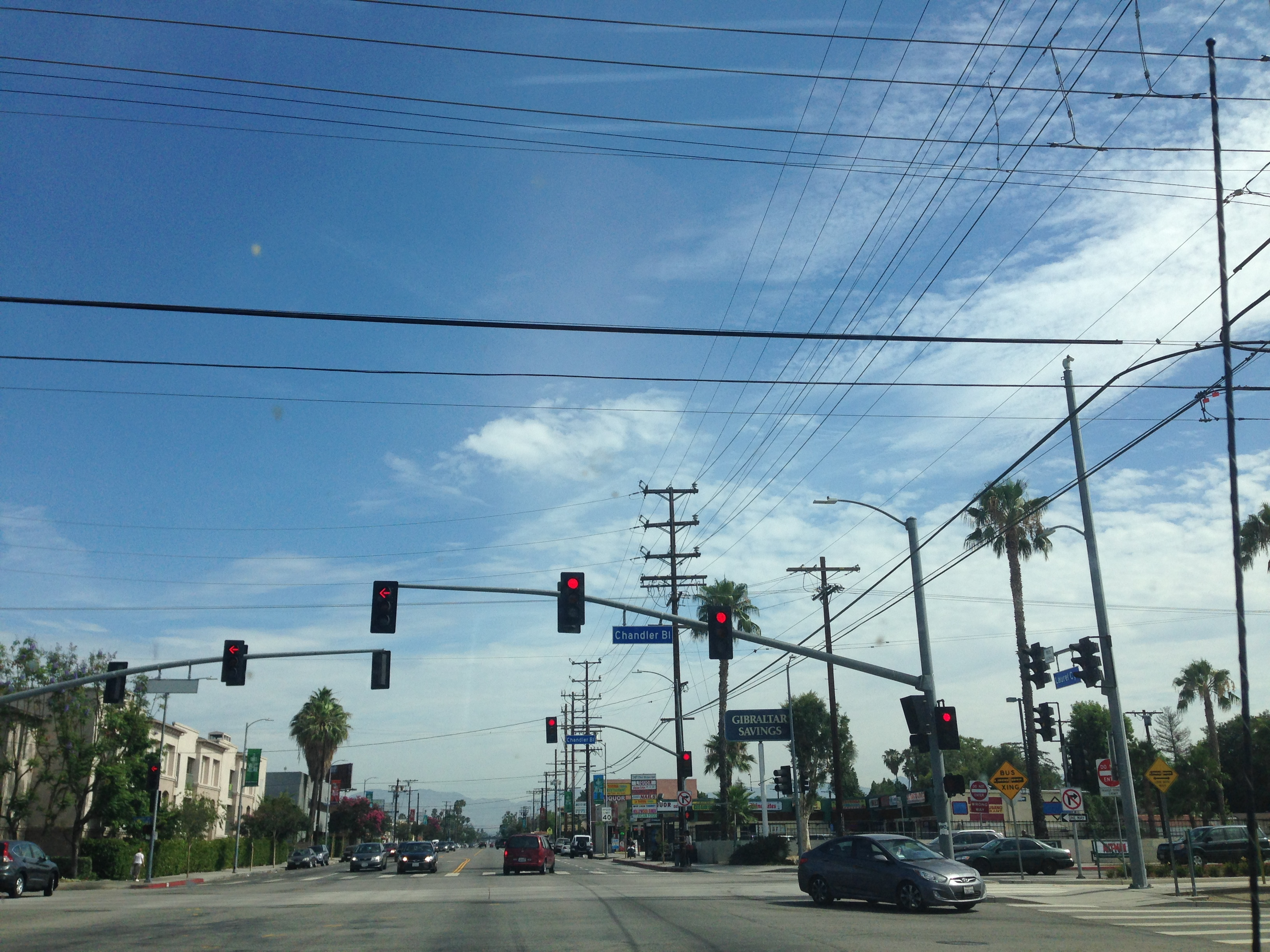
An intersection in Valley Village

=== Google Maps ===
The boundaries of Valley Village as delineated by Google Maps are Burbank Boulevard to the north, the Tujunga Wash to the west, the Ventura Freeway (U.S. 101) to the south and the Hollywood Freeway (SR 170) to the east.

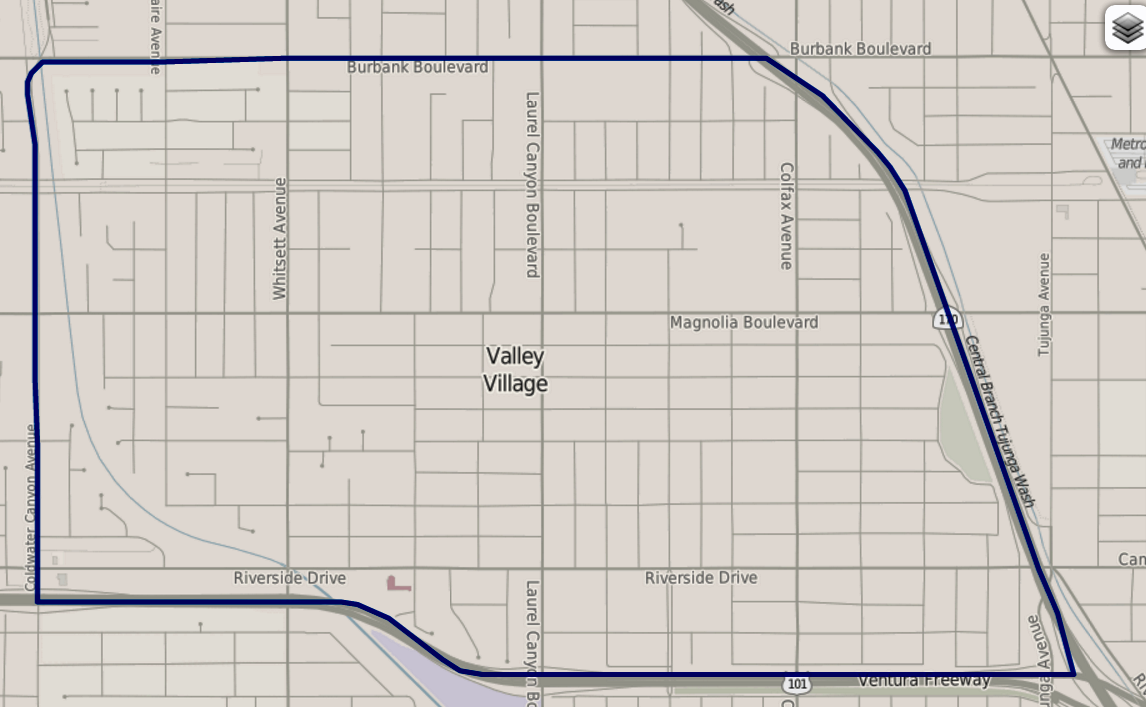
Valley Village as mapped by the Los Angeles Times

=== The Los Angeles Times' Mapping L.A. Project ===
The Los Angeles Times' Mapping L.A. Project delineates the Valley Village borders as Burbank Boulevard to the north, the Hollywood Freeway to the east, the Ventura Freeway to the south and Coldwater Canyon Avenue to the west.

The 2.09-square-mile (5.4 km^{2}) neighborhood lies north of Studio City, east of Sherman Oaks, and south and west of North Hollywood.

=== Climate ===
Located within the San Fernando Valley, Valley Village has a higher degree of diurnal temperature variation than the nearby Los Angeles Basin or coastal areas. According to the Köppen climate classification system, Valley Village has a hot-summer Mediterranean climate (Csa), with subtropical and semi-arid characteristics. Summers are long, hot, dry and smoggy, with average high temperatures in the mid-80s to lower-90s °F (30–34 °C), with nighttime lows in the upper-50s to lower-60s °F (14–17 °C). Temperatures reach or surpass 100 °F (38 °C) several times during the summer, raising the risk of heat stroke or other heat-related illnesses. The all-time record high temperature in Valley Village is 117 °F (47 °C), recorded on September 6, 2020.

Winters are short, sunny and typically warm, with average high temperatures in the upper-60s to lower-70s °F (20–23 °C), but with chilly nights in the lower-to-mid 40s °F (4–7 °C). Winter is also the wet season, but rain is usually infrequent, even during the winter months, as most of the area's rain comes from Pacific storms. It can be especially rainy during El Niño cycles, with flash flooding sometimes occurring. Sub-freezing temperatures (32 °F, 0 °C) and below, as well as frosts, occur several times during the winter; however, these cold weather events are typically brief, usually only lasting for a day or two before temperatures return to normal. Snow is extremely rare. The all-time record low temperature in Valley Village is 23 °F (–5 °C), recorded on January 29, 1979.

Spring and fall hardly exist in this climate, with these months typically being sunny and warm. The Santa Ana winds typically occur between fall and spring, lowering humidity levels and raising temperatures, which increases the risk for wildfires. During the late spring and early summer, more specifically in the months of May and June, conditions are often overcast and foggy, a phenomenon known by local residents as "May Gray" or "June Gloom".

Climate data for Valley Village, Los Angeles
Month	Jan	Feb	Mar	Apr	May	Jun	Jul	Aug	Sep	Oct	Nov	Dec	Year
Record high °F (°C)	92 (33)	92 (33)	98 (37)	103 (39)	105 (41)	114 (46)	115 (46)	112 (44)	117 (47)	106 (41)	97 (36)	93 (34)	117 (47)
Mean daily maximum °F (°C)	67.4 (19.7)	68.1 (20.1)	71.0 (21.7)	74.5 (23.6)	78.7 (25.9)	84.0 (28.9)	90.3 (32.4)	91.9 (33.3)	88.7 (31.5)	81.2 (27.3)	73.6 (23.1)	67.1 (19.5)	78.0 (25.6)
Mean daily minimum °F (°C)	42.1 (5.6)	43.4 (6.3)	45.6 (7.6)	48.6 (9.2)	53.3 (11.8)	57.0 (13.9)	61.0 (16.1)	61.2 (16.2)	59.1 (15.1)	52.8 (11.6)	45.6 (7.6)	41.2 (5.1)	50.9 (10.5)
Record low °F (°C)	23 (−5)	26 (−3)	28 (−2)	30 (−1)	32 (0)	36 (2)	40 (4)	41 (5)	39 (4)	31 (−1)	28 (−2)	26 (−3)	23 (−5)
Average precipitation inches (mm)	3.94 (100)	4.32 (110)	3.51 (89)	0.84 (21)	0.27 (6.9)	0.06 (1.5)	0.01 (0.25)	0.17 (4.3)	0.25 (6.4)	0.50 (13)	1.19 (30)	2.05 (52)	17.12 (435)
Source 1:
Source 2:

== Housing ==
In 1994, the Los Angeles Times called Valley Village an "area of upscale residences." The 2000 census found that renters occupied 68.7% of the housing units, and homeowners occupied the remaining 31.3%. In 2006, Valley Village was described in another article as a neighborhood "mostly of 1,700 sqft, single-story Spanish- and ranch-style homes that typically sit on nice-size lots." Most of the 3,881 single-family homes were on residential streets, and 1,073 condos and 8,213 apartment units lined the main boulevards.

== Population ==
A total of 24,190 people lived in Valley Village's 2.09 square miles, according to the 2000 U.S. census – averaging 11,600 people per square mile, about average for Los Angeles. Population was estimated at 25,665 in 2008. With its percentage of white people considered high for Los Angeles County, Valley Village is still moderately diverse in its ethnic makeup, with a diversity index of 0.512. "The diversity index measures the probability that any two residents, chosen at random, would be of different ethnicities. If all residents are of the same ethnic group it's zero. If half are from one group and half from another it's .50." Whites made up 66.7% of the population, Latinos were 18.9%, with black people at 5.5% and Asians and others both at 4.4%. The median age was 36, considered old when compared to the city as a whole. There is a sizable Jewish community.

The $55,470 median household income in 2008 dollars was average for the city and county. The average household size of two people was low for both the city and the county. The percentages of divorced men, divorced women, never-married men and widowed women were among the county's highest.

== Education ==
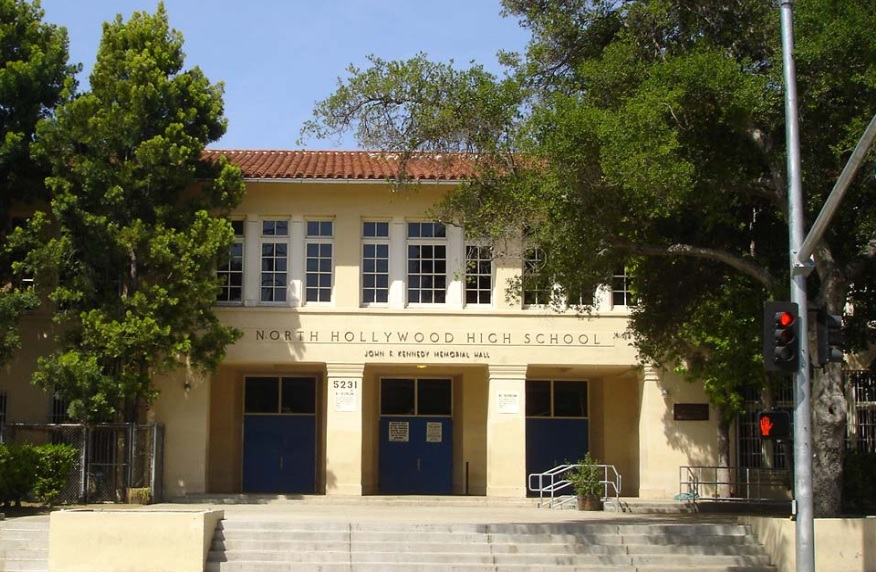
North Hollywood Senior High School

Schools within Valley Village are:

High schools:

- North Hollywood High School, 5231 Colfax Avenue, LAUSD.
- Valley Torah High School, 12517 Chandler Boulevard, Private.
- Oakwood Secondary School, 11600 Magnolia Boulevard, Private.

Continuation school:

- Amelia Earhart, 5355 Colfax Avenue, LAUSD.

Elementary schools:

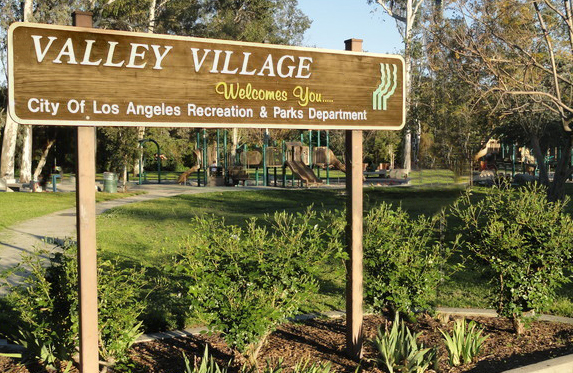
Valley Village Park

- Burbank Boulevard Elementary, 12215 Albers Street, LAUSD.
- Colfax Charter Elementary, 11724 Addison Street, LAUSD Charter.
- The Country School (Pre-K - 8th), 5243 Laurel Canyon Boulevard, Private.

== Parks and recreation ==
- Valley Village Park - located at 5000 Westpark Drive, the park features a children's play area, picnic tables, Restroom(s), and walking paths.
- Tujunga Wash Greenway

== Marilyn Monroe house ==
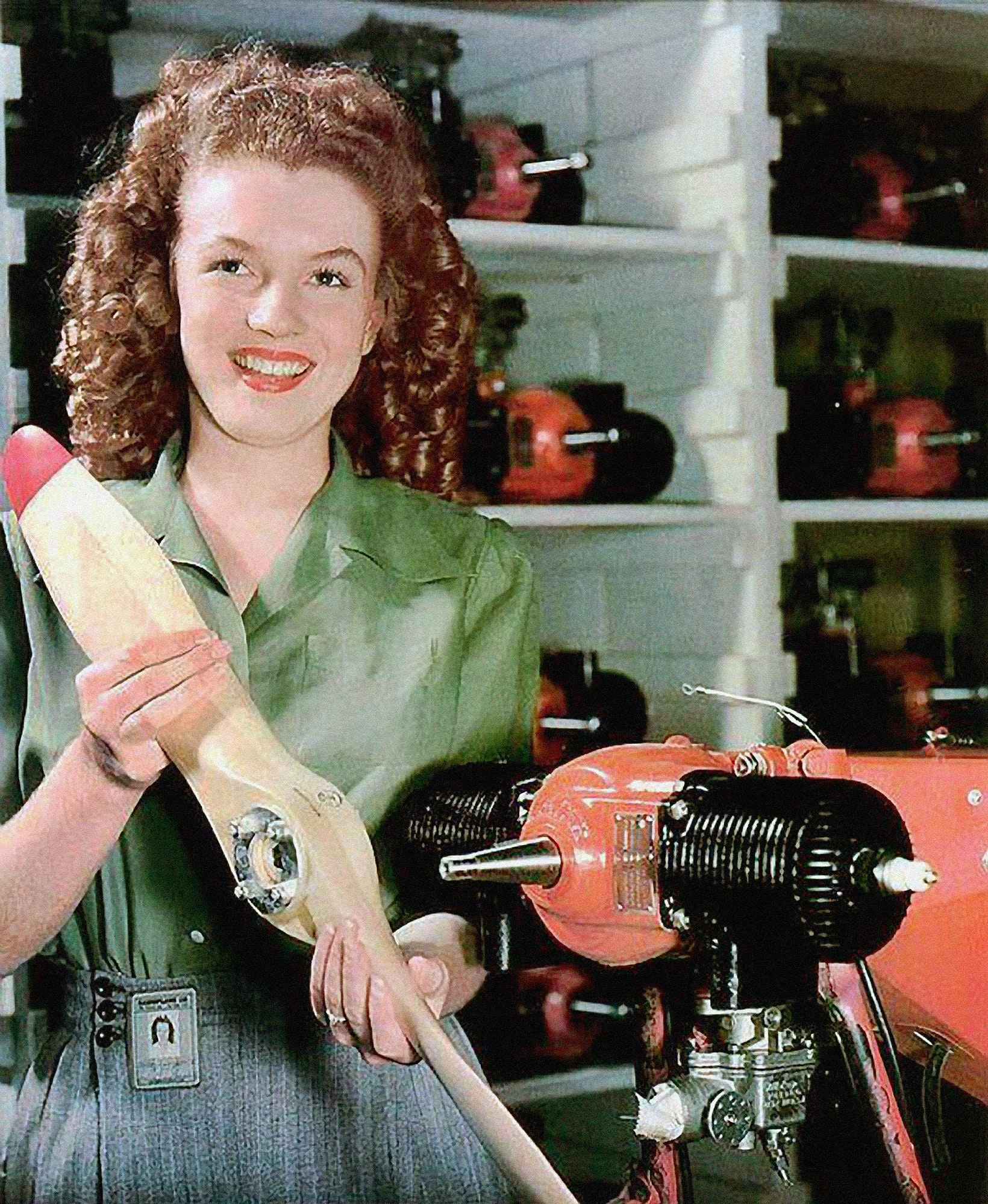
Marilyn Monroe while living in Valley Village, 1944

A house at 5258 Hermitage Avenue, where film actress Marilyn Monroe lived in 1944–45 under her married name of Norma Jean Dougherty, was demolished by a property developer to make way for a condominium project in June 2015 even as it was under consideration as a historic landmark. She lived there at age 17 while her husband, James Dougherty, was in the Navy, and she had a job inspecting parachutes at a nearby factory. She was living there when she was asked to pose for her first pin-up photo. It was said, however, that the chances of the house being declared a landmark were slim because, as Ken Bernstein, director of the city's Office of Historic Resources, put it, "There are hundreds, if not thousands, of houses associated with celebrities. Monroe resided at the property for only one year "and did not live in the unit during the productive period of her career," a report by city planning officials said.

In October 2015, Los Angeles was facing a lawsuit over the house's destruction by a group called Save Valley Village. At issue was the City Council's practice of "automatically heeding the wishes" of the council member who represents any given area in a controversy. The group said it also had "overwhelming evidence" that an environmental report should have been prepared for the condo project. The group also asked that the city nullify any development projects that received unanimous support during the previous twelve months.

== Notable residents ==
- Ryan Turell (born 1999), basketball player in the Israeli Basketball Premier League, Yeshiva University.
- Richard Rossi (born 1963), filmmaker, novelist, and musician.
- Mark Duplass (born 1979), filmmaker and actor

== Twin towns ==
Valley Village is twinned with Saint-Nom-la-Bretèche, France.
