= 2016–17 Aris Thessaloniki B.C. season =

Aris B.C.
2016–17 season
- Head coach: Dimitrios Priftis
- Greek Basket League: 4th (4th in Regular Season)
- Greek Cup: Finalist
- Champions League: Round of 16

The 2016–17 Aris Thessaloniki B.C. season was the 63rd appearance in the top-tier level Greek Basket League for Aris Thessaloniki. The team also competed in the Greek Basketball Cup, where they lost in the final from Panathinaikos Superfoods in Alexandreio Melathron Nick Galis Hall, and in the Basketball Champions League.

== Overview ==
Competition	Record							
Competition	Pld	W	D	L	PF	PA	PD	Win %
Greek Basket League (Regular Season)	26	15	0	11	1,972	1,863	+109	57.69
Greek Basket League (Playoffs)	8	2	0	6	568	639	−71	25.00
Greek Basketball Cup	3	2	0	1	234	206	+28	66.67
Basketball Champions League (Regular Season)	14	8	0	6	1,078	992	+86	57.14
Basketball Champions League (Playoffs)	4	1	1	2	275	281	−6	25.00
Total	55	28	1	26	4,127	3,981	+146	50.91

Last updated: 3 June 2017
Source: Competitions

== Roster ==
#	Position	Player	Height	Born
0	C/PF	(United States) Justin Jackson	2.05 m (6 ft 8.75 in)	13 October 1990
1	PG	(United States) Antwan Scott	1.88 m (6 ft 2 in)	28 February 1992
4	PG	(Greece) Vassilis Xanthopoulos	1.88 m (6 ft 2 in)	29 April 1984
5	SG/SF	(Greece) Panagiotis Kalaitzakis	1.98 m (6 ft 6 in)	2 January 1999
7	PG/SG	(Greece) Dimitris Flionis	1.90 m (6 ft 2.75 in)	8 April 1997
9	PF/C	(Greece) Michalis Tsairelis	2.08 m (6 ft 10 in)	23 February 1988
12	PG	(United States) Will Cummings	1.88 m (6 ft 2 in)	7 October 1992
13	SG/SF	(Greece) Theodoros Zaras	1.97 m (6 ft 5.75 in)	12 August 1987
14	PF/C	(Greece) Vassilis Christidis	2.08 m (6 ft 10 in)	10 July 1998
16	SG/SF	(Greece) Spyros Mourtos	1.98 m (6 ft 6 in)	5 December 1990
17	PF/C	(Greece) Vassilis Symtsak	2.07 m (6 ft 9.5 in)	3 March 1981
28	SF	(Greece) Vlado Janković	2.02 m (6 ft 7.5 in)	3 March 1990
31	SF/PF	(Georgia (country)) Viktor Sanikidze	2.03 m (6 ft 8 in)	1 April 1986
33	C	(Greece) Vassilis Kavvadas	2.06 m (6 ft 9 in)	28 December 1991
34	PF	(Serbia) Tadija Dragićević	2.06 m (6 ft 9 in)	28 January 1986

=== Roster changes ===
==== In ====
Position	#	Player	Moving from
PF	34	(Serbia) Tadija Dragićević	(Montenegro) Budućnost Voli
SF	28	(Greece) Vlado Janković	(Spain) Valencia
C	0	(United States) Justin Jackson	(Poland) Czarni Słupsk
PG/SG	22	(United States) Jamon Gordon	Free agent
SG	1	(United States) Antwan Scott	(Netherlands) Den Bosch Basketball

==== Out ====
Position	#	Player	Moving to
PG/SG	5	(Greece) Stelios Poulianitis	(Greece) Trikala Aries
SG/SF	1	(United States) Devyn Marble	(Italy) Aquila Basket Trento
PF/C	20	(United States) Eric Buckner	(Turkey) Büyükçekmece Basketbol
PG/SG	22	(United States) Jamon Gordon	Free agent
PG/SG	11	(United States) Michael Jenkins	(Italy) Pistoia Basket 2000

== Competitions ==
=== Greek Basket League ===
==== Regular season ====
===== Standings =====
Pos	Team	Pld	W	L	PF	PA	PD	Pts	Qualification or relegation
1	Olympiacos	26	25	1	2096	1650	+446	51	Qualification to Semifinals
2	Panathinaikos Superfoods	26	25	1	2206	1706	+500	51	Qualification to Semifinals
3	AEK Athens	26	19	7	2055	1834	+221	45	Qualification to Quarterfinals
4	Aris Thessaliniki	26	15	11	1972	1863	+109	41	Qualification to Quarterfinals
5	PAOK	26	14	12	1972	2009	−37	40	Qualification to First Round
6	Rethymno Cretan Kings	26	13	13	1953	2008	−55	39	Qualification to First Round
7	Kolossos H Hotels	26	13	13	1866	1887	−21	39	Qualification to First Round
8	Lavrio DHI	26	11	15	1894	1956	−62	37	Qualification to First Round
9	Promitheas Patras	26	10	16	1857	1930	−73	36	
10	Trikala Aries	26	10	16	1817	1959	−142	36	
11	Koroivos	26	8	18	1881	2154	−273	34	
12	Kymis Seajets	26	8	18	1821	2022	−201	34	
13	Apollon Patras Carna	26	7	19	1799	1959	−160	33	Relegation to Greek A2 League
14	Doxa Lefkadas	26	4	22	1780	2032	−252	30	Relegation to Greek A2 League

Updated to match(es) played on 13 April 2017. Source: ESAKE

===== Matches =====
Win Loss

8 October 2016 1	Aris Thessaloniki	75–65	Aries Trikala BC	Thessaloniki
17:00	Scoring by quarter: 25–15, 20–14, 20–13, 10–23
	Pts: Devyn Marble 17; Rebs: Eric Buckner 8 Asts: Will Cummings 5		Pts: Kelsey Barlow 16; Rebs: David Haughton, Gilvydas Biruta 8 Asts: (8 players) 1	Arena: Nick Galis Hall

15 October 2016 2	Rethymno Cretan Kings BC	69–60	Aris Thessaloniki	Rethymno
16:00	Scoring by quarter: 14–21, 16–13, 20–10, 19–16
	Pts: Gary Talton 16; Rebs: Charis Giannopoulos, Roeland Schaftenaar 8 Asts: Gary Talton 5		Pts: Vassilis Kavvadas 18; Rebs: Eric Buckner 6 Asts: Vassilis Xanthopoulos 5	Arena: Melina Merkouri Indoor Hall

22 October 2016 3	Aris Thessaloniki	62–66	P.A.O.K. BC	Thessaloniki
19:15	Scoring by quarter: 18–16, 14–17, 11–15, 19–18
	Pts: Will Cummings 13; Rebs: Will Cummings, Tadija Dragićević 6 Asts: Will Cummings 4		Pts: Darryl Bryant 14; Rebs: Linos Chrysikopoulos, Žanis Peiners 7 Asts: Darryl Bryant, Nenad Miljenović 3	Arena: Nick Galis Hall

29 October 2016 4	Promitheas Patras B.C.	79–89	Aris Thessaloniki	Patras
17:00	Scoring by quarter: 23–19, 16–24, 18–20, 22–26
	Pts: McKenzie Moore 19; Rebs: Mouhammad Faye 6 Asts: McKenzie Moore 5		Pts: Michael Jenkins 29; Rebs: Michael Jenkins 8 Asts: Michael Jenkins, Will Cummings 4	Arena: Dimitris Tofalos Arena

7 November 2016 5	Aris Thessaloniki	63–70	Olympiacos B.C.	Thessaloniki
19:00	Scoring by quarter: 20–21, 14–23, 17–14, 12–12
	Pts: Tadija Dragićević 18; Rebs: Tadija Dragićević 8 Asts: Devyn Marble 5		Pts: Vassilis Spanoulis 13; Rebs: Khem Birch 12; Asts: Vassilis Spanoulis 11	Arena: Nick Galis Hall

12 November 2016 6	Koroivos B.C.	94–99(OT)	Aris Thessaloniki	Amaliada
17:00	Scoring by quarter: 34–14, 17–23, 16–21, 9–18, Overtime: 18-23
	Pts: Ken Brown 27; Rebs: Toddrick Gotcher, Kenny Hall 8 Asts: Ken Brown 7		Pts: Devyn Marble 28; Rebs: Devyn Marble 10; Asts: Will Cummings 7	Arena: Amaliada Indoor Hall

21 November 2016 7	Aris Thessaloniki	59–71	Panathinaikos B.C.	Thessaloniki
19:00	Scoring by quarter: 14–17, 14–19, 17–15, 14–20
	Pts: Will Cummings 17; Rebs: Will Cummings 8 Asts: (3 players) 4		Pts: Chris Singleton 13; Rebs: Ioannis Bourousis 13; Asts: Nick Calathes 9	Arena: Nick Galis Hall

26 November 2016 8	Doxa Lefkadas B.C.	69–79	Aris Thessaloniki	Lefkada
17:00	Scoring by quarter: 14–21, 14–24, 22–20, 19–14
	Pts: Melsahn Basabe 19; Rebs: Melsahn Basabe 10; Asts: Dimitrios Tsaldaris 5		Pts: Michael Jenkins, Will Cummings 19; Rebs: Eric Buckner 9 Asts: Michael Jenkins 4	Arena: Lefkada Indoor Hall

3 December 2016 9	Aris Thessaloniki	84–60	Kolossos Rodou B.C.	Thessaloniki
17:00	Scoring by quarter: 20–18, 27–13, 21–8, 16–21
	Pts: Tadija Dragićević 21; Rebs: Devyn Marble 6 Asts: Michael Jenkins, Vassilis Xanthopoulos 3		Pts: Trevor Releford 16; Rebs: Panagiotis Vasilopoulos 8 Asts: Trevor Releford, Roope Ahonen 2	Arena: Nick Galis Hall

10 December 2016 10	Aris Thessaloniki	85–72	Kymis B.C.	Thessaloniki
17:00	Scoring by quarter: 25–14, 23–18, 22–18, 15–22
	Pts: Tadija Dragićević 21; Rebs: Tadija Dragićević 8 Asts: Vassilis Xanthopoulos 5		Pts: Stavros Toutziarakis 15; Rebs: Stavros Toutziarakis 12; Asts: Dimitrios Stamati 4	Arena: Nick Galis Hall

17 December 2016 11	Apollon Patras B.C.	64–79	Aris Thessaloniki	Patras
17:00	Scoring by quarter: 11–24, 7–16, 26–21, 20–18
	Pts: Anthony Hickey 16; Rebs: Edin Bavčić, Ioannis Kouzeloglou 6 Asts: Edin Bavčić, Michael Cobbins 3		Pts: Tadija Dragićević 17; Rebs: Vassilis Xanthopoulos 6 Asts: (3 players) 4	Arena: Apollon Patras Indoor Hall

26 December 2016 12	Aris Thessaloniki	98–77	Lavrio B.C.	Thessaloniki
17:00	Scoring by quarter: 24–19, 26–16, 22–24, 26–18
	Pts: Vassilis Kavvadas 20; Rebs: Vassilis Symtsak 9 Asts: Vassilis Xanthopoulos 5		Pts: Demarius Bolds 15; Rebs: D.J. Shelton 4 Asts: Christoforos Stefanidis 10	Arena: Nick Galis Hall

7 January 2017 13	AEK B.C.	81–61	Aris Thessaloniki	Athens
17:00	Scoring by quarter: 23–20, 24–16, 16–12, 18–13
	Pts: Michael Dixon 19; Rebs: Dimitrios Mavroeidis 9 Asts: Roko Ukić, Nikola Ivanović 5		Pts: Will Cummings 14; Rebs: Will Cummings, Tadija Dragićević 7 Asts: Vassilis Xanthopoulos 5	Arena: Nikos Galis Olympic Indoor Hall

21 January 2017 14	Trikala Aries B.C.	78–62	Aris Thessaloniki	Trikala
17:00	Scoring by quarter: 16–14, 22–11, 22–17, 18–20
	Pts: Kelsey Barlow 18; Rebs: Gilvydas Biruta 9 Asts: Kelsey Barlow 4		Pts: Tadija Dragićević 16; Rebs: Vassilis Symtsak 8 Asts: Vassilis Xanthopoulos 5	Arena: Trikala Indoor Hall

28 January 2017 15	Aris Thessaloniki	98–50	Rethymno Cretan Kings B.C.	Thessaloniki
17:00	Scoring by quarter: 23–6, 23–20, 29–14, 23–10
	Pts: Vassilis Kavvadas 18; Rebs: Vassilis Kavvadas 5 Asts: Tadija Dragićević 7		Pts: Robert Arnold 11; Rebs: Dejan Kravić 6 Asts: Toarlyn Fitzpatrick 4	Arena: Nick Galis Hall

4 February 2017 16	P.A.O.K. BC	62–58	Aris Thessaloniki	Thessaloniki
21:00	Scoring by quarter: 17-21, 12-15, 15-9, 18-13
	Pts: Vangelis Margaritis 15; Rebs: Keith Clanton 15; Asts: (3 players) 2		Pts: Michael Jenkins 12; Rebs: Vassilis Xanthopoulos 5 Asts: Will Cummings 3	Arena: P.A.O.K. Sports Arena

11 February 2017 17	Aris Thessaloniki	80–64	Promitheas Patras B.C.	Thessaloniki
17:00	Scoring by quarter: 19-18, 21-9, 17-19, 23-18
	Pts: Will Cummings 16; Rebs: Justin Jackson 7 Asts: Justin Jackson 3		Pts: Jerel Blassingame 15; Rebs: (3 players) 5 Asts: Nikos Gikas 3	Arena: Nick Galis Hall

15 February 2017 18	Olympiacos B.C.	69–55	Aris Thessaloniki	Piraeus
18:30	Scoring by quarter: 20-9, 20-12, 14-20, 15-14
	Pts: Erick Green 14; Rebs: Khem Birch 6 Asts: Vangelis Mantzaris 4		Pts: Vassilis Kavvadas 13; Rebs: Vlado Janković 8 Asts: Vlado Janković 4	Arena: Peace and Friendship Stadium

25 February 2017 19	Aris Thessaloniki	100–79	Koroivos B.C.	Thessaloniki
17:00	Scoring by quarter: 23-19, 22-25, 28-19, 27-16
	Pts: Vlado Janković 21; Rebs: Justin Jackson; Asts: Will Cummings 5		Pts: Markel Starks 21; Rebs: Giannis Sachpatzidis 8 Asts: Markel Starks 5	Arena: Nick Galis Hall

5 March 2017 20	Panathinaikos B.C.	70–54	Aris Thessaloniki	Athens
17:00	Scoring by quarter: 20-20, 24-10, 9-13, 17-11
	Pts: Mike James 19; Rebs: Chris Singleton 12; Asts: Mike James 4		Pts: Vlado Janković 13; Rebs: Vlado Janković, Vassilis Xanthopoulos 7 Asts: Jamon Gordon 4	Arena: Nikos Galis Olympic Indoor Hall

11 March 2017 21	Aris Thessaloniki	78–70	Doxa Lefkadas B.C.	Thessaloniki
17:00	Scoring by quarter: 19-26, 18-16, 28-10, 13-18
	Pts: Vassilis Kavvadas 20; Rebs: Vassilis Kavvadas, Vassilis Symtsak 7 Asts: Vlado Janković 4		Pts: Alex Harris 17; Rebs: Ivan Maraš 13; Asts: Shannon Scott 8	Arena: Nick Galis Hall

18 March 2017 22	Kolossos Rodou B.C.	85–84	Aris Thessaloniki	Rhodes
17:00	Scoring by quarter: 24-15, 26-20, 23-21, 12-28
	Pts: Roope Ahonen 14; Rebs: Panagiotis Vasilopoulos 11; Asts: Trevor Releford 5		Pts: Will Cummings 24; Rebs: Vassilis Kavvadas, Tadija Dragićević 4 Asts: Will Cummings 5	Arena: Venetokleio Indoor Hall

25 March 2017 23	Kymis B.C.	77–80(OT)	Aris Thessaloniki	Kymi
17:00	Scoring by quarter: 20-13, 5-22, 25-22, 21-14, Overtime: 6-9
	Pts: Slaven Čupković 14; Rebs: Dimitrios Stamatis 6 Asts: Jason Cadee 4		Pts: Will Cummings 17; Rebs: Vlado Janković, Vassilis Kavvadas 10; Asts: Vassilis Xanthopoulos	Arena: Tasos Kabouris Kanithou Indoor Hall

1 April 2017 24	Aris Thessaloniki	79–70	Apollon Patras B.C.	Thessaloniki
17:00	Scoring by quarter: 25-14, 23-14, 17-22, 14-20
	Pts: Will Cummings, Justin Jackson 15; Rebs: Spyros Mourtos 7 Asts: Will Cummings 5		Pts: Steve Burtt 21; Rebs: Ioannis Kouzeloglou 8 Asts: (3 players) 3	Arena: Nick Galis Hall

8 April 2017 25	Lavrio B.C.	75–70	Aris Thessaloniki	Lavrio
17:00	Scoring by quarter: 22-23, 17-15, 21-15, 15-17
	Pts: Demarius Bolds 22; Rebs: Sean Evans 9 Asts: Steven Gray 6		Pts: Will Cummings 25; Rebs: Will Cummings 9 Asts: Will Cummings 5	Arena: Lavrio Indoor Hall

13 April 2017 26	Aris Thessaloniki	81–77	AEK B.C.	Thessaloniki
17:00	Scoring by quarter: 15-24, 22-23, 17-10, 27-20
	Pts: Will Cummings 24; Rebs: (3 players) 6 Asts: Vassilis Xanthopoulos 6		Pts: Donnie McGrath 17; Rebs: Chinemelu Elonu 8 Asts: Roko Ukić 7	Arena: Nick Galis Hall

===== Results overview =====
Win Loss

Opposition	Home score	Away score	Double
AEK Athens	81-77	61-81	142-158
Apollon Patras Carna	79-70	79-64	158-134
Doxa Lefkadas	78-70	79-69	157-139
Kolossos H Hotels	84-60	84-85	168-145
Koroivos	100-79	99-94	199-173
Kymis Seajets	85-72	80-77	165-149
Lavrio DHI	98-77	70-75	168-152
Olympiacos	63-70	55-69	118-139
Panathinaikos Superfoods	59-71	54-70	113-141
PAOK	62-66	58-62	120-128
Promitheas Patras	80-64	89-79	169-143
Rethymno Cretan Kings	98-50	60-69	158-119
Trikala Aries	75-65	62-78	137-143

==== Playoffs ====
===== Quarterfinals =====
29 April 2017 Quarterfinals	Aris Thessaloniki	69–65(OT) (Series: 1-0)	P.A.O.K. BC	Thessaloniki
19:00	Scoring by quarter: 16-20, 17-17, 14-13, 14-11, Overtime: 8-4
	Pts: Vassilis Xanthopoulos 16; Rebs: Vassilis Symtsak 12; Asts: Vassilis Xanthopoulos, Vlado Janković 4		Pts: Nathan Sobey 20; Rebs: Keith Clanton 11; Asts: Antonis Koniaris 4	Arena: Nick Galis Hall

3 May 2017 Quarterfinals	P.A.O.K. BC	75–84 (Series: 0-2)	Aris Thessaloniki	Thessaloniki
19:00	Scoring by quarter: 18-25, 22-27, 19-11, 16-21
	Pts: Žanis Peiners 14; Rebs: Keith Clanton 15; Asts: Antonis Koniaris, Apollon Tsochlas 3		Pts: Tadija Dragićević 21; Rebs: Vassilis Kavvadas 6 Asts: Vassilis Xanthopoulos 5	Arena: P.A.O.K. Sports Arena

===== Semifinals =====
10 May 2017 Semifinals	Olympiacos B.C.	84–54 (Series: 1-0)	Aris Thessaloniki	Piraeus
19:00	Scoring by quarter: 21-17, 23-14, 20-7, 20-16
	Pts: Kostas Papanikolaou 17; Rebs: Dimitrios Agravanis 8 Asts: Erick Green 6		Pts: Vassilis Kavvadas 14; Rebs: Vassilis Kavvadas, Michalis Tsairelis 6 Asts: Will Cummings 3	Arena: Peace and Friendship Stadium

13 May 2017 Semifinals	Aris Thessaloniki	77–84 (Series: 0-2)	Olympiacos B.C.	Thessaloniki
17:00	Scoring by quarter: 14-24, 27-19, 14-24, 22-17
	Pts: Will Cummings 16; Rebs: Vassilis Symtsak 9 Asts: Vlado Janković 3		Pts: Kostas Papanikolaou 23; Rebs: Khem Birch 14; Asts: Vassilis Spanoulis 8	Arena: Nick Galis Hall

25 May 2017 Semifinals	Olympiacos B.C.	79–65 (Series: 3-0)	Aris Thessaloniki	Piraeus
19:00	Scoring by quarter: 22-13, 17-12, 26-24, 14-16
	Pts: Ioannis Papapetrou 18; Rebs: Patric Young 8 Asts: Vassilis Spanoulis 6		Pts: will Cummings 21; Rebs: Vlado Janković 6 Asts: Vlado Janković 5	Arena: Peace and Friendship Stadium

===== Third Place =====
28 May 2017 Finals	AEK B.C.	90–74 (Series: 1-0)	Aris Thessaloniki	Athens
18:00	Scoring by quarter: 23-24, 25-17, 20-16, 22-17
	Pts: Milan Milošević 16; Rebs: Milan Milošević 12; Asts: Michael Dixon 9		Pts: Vlado Janković 17; Rebs: Vlado Janković 11; Asts: Vassilis Xanthopoulos 5	Arena: Nikos Galis Olympic Indoor Hall

31 May 2017 Finals	Aris Thessaloniki	85–91 (Series: 0-2)	AEK B.C.	Thessaloniki
17:30	Scoring by quarter: 21-22, 30-21, 17-20, 17-28
	Pts: Vlado Janković, Spyros Mourtos 18; Rebs: Vlado Janković 12; Asts: Vassilis Xanthopoulos 7		Pts: Giannoulis Larentzakis, Loukas Mavrokefalidis 19; Rebs: Michael Dixon, Milan Milošević 5 Asts: Michael Dixon 9	Arena: Nick Galis Hall

3 June 2017 Finals	AEK B.C.	71–60 (Series: 3-0)	Aris Thessaloniki	Athens
17:00	Scoring by quarter: 18-19, 24-18, 14-8, 15-15
	Pts: Michael Dixon 19; Rebs: Chinemelu Elonu 9 Asts: Michael Dixon 6		Pts: Vassilis Kavvadas, Michalis Tsairelis 11; Rebs: Spyros Mourtos 10; Asts: Dimitris Flionis 4	Arena: Nikos Galis Olympic Indoor Hall

=== Greek Cup ===
==== Quarterfinal ====
5 October 2016 Quarterfinals	Aris Thessaloniki	98–62	Kymis B.C.	Thessaloniki
18:30	Scoring by quarter: 25-18, 38-9, 10-18, 25-17
	Pts: Michael Jenkins, Will Cummings 14; Rebs: Viktor Sanikidze 10; Asts: Will Cummings, Viktor Sanikidze 6		Pts: Muhammad El-Amin 15; Rebs: Jordan Morgan 7 Asts: (3 players) 2	Arena: Nick Galis Hall

==== Semifinal ====
14 January 2017 Semifinals	Aris Thessaloniki	77–76	AEK Athens	Thessaloniki
17:00	Scoring by quarter: 26-17, 20-27, 15-17, 16-15
	Pts: Will Cummings 20; Rebs: Vlado Janković 11; Asts: Michael Jenkins 4		Pts: Michael Dixon 23; Rebs: Dimitrios Mavroeidis 10; Asts: Roko Ukić 6	Arena: Nick Galis Hall

==== Final ====
18 February 2017 Final	Panathinaikos Superfoods	68–59	Aris Thessaloniki	Thessaloniki
17:00	Scoring by quarter: 18-10, 11-17, 21-10, 18-22
	Pts: James Feldeine 18; Rebs: Kenny Gabriel 8 Asts: Nick Calathes 3		Pts: Will Cummings 20; Rebs: Michael Jenkins, Vassilis Symtsak 6 Asts: Michael Jenkins 2	Arena: Nick Galis Hall

=== Champions League ===
==== Regular season ====
===== League table =====
Pos	Team	Pld	W	L	PF	PA	PD	Pts	Qualification
1	(France) AS Monaco Basket	14	12	2	1034	919	+115	26	Advance to 2nd phase
2	(Turkey) Banvit	14	11	3	1130	1010	+120	25	Advance to 2nd phase
3	(Czech Republic) ČEZ Basketball Nymburk	14	10	4	1124	1005	+119	24	Advance to 1st phase
4	(Greece) Aris Thessaliniki	14	8	6	1078	992	+86	22	Advance to 1st phase
5	(Germany) Fraport Skyliners Frankfurt	14	7	7	978	983	−5	21	Advance to 1st phase
6	(Israel) Ironi Nahariya	14	5	9	1013	1035	−22	19	Transfer to FIBA Europe Cup
7	(Slovenia) Helios Suns Domžale	14	2	12	834	947	−113	16	
8	(Denmark) Bakken Bears	14	1	13	963	1263	−300	15	

Updated to match(es) played on 25 January 2017. Source: BCL

===== Matches =====
Win Loss

18 October 2016 1	Helios Suns (Slovenia)	54–62	(Greece) Aris Thessaloniki	Domžale
20:00	Scoring by quarter: 12–18, 15–12, 15–19, 12–13
	Pts: Brandyn Curry 13; Rebs: Tomaž Bolčina 7 Asts: Jure Močnik 5		Pts: Vassilis Kavvadas 16; Rebs: Vassilis Xanthopoulos 10; Asts: Will Cummings 5	Arena: Komunalni center Hall

26 October 2016 2	Aris Thessaloniki (Greece)	82–66	(Denmark) Bakken Bears	Thessaloniki
21:00	Scoring by quarter: 31–14, 25–26, 8–14, 18–12
	Pts: Devyn Marble 21; Rebs: Vassilis Symtsak, Eric Buckner 7 Asts: Vassilis Xanthopoulos 6		Pts: DeVaughn Akoon-Purcell 14; Rebs: DeVaughn Akoon-Purcell, Michel Diouf 9 Asts: Mike Gesell 3	Arena: Nick Galis Hall

2 November 2016 3	Ironi Nahariya (Israel)	53–85	(Greece) Aris Thessaloniki	Nahariya
19:00	Scoring by quarter: 6–19, 21–21, 15–26, 11–19
	Pts: Nick Faust, Tomer Bar Even 10; Rebs: Yancy Gates 8 Asts: Gilbert Brown, Niv Berkovitz 4		Pts: Michael Jenkins 22; Rebs: Eric Buckner 8 Asts: Will Cummings 6	Arena: Ein Sara Sport Hall

9 November 2016 4	Aris Thessaloniki (Greece)	85–78	(Turkey) Banvit	Thessaloniki
21:00	Scoring by quarter: 15–24, 21–14, 24–23, 24–17
	Pts: Vlado Janković 19; Rebs: Vlado Janković 10; Asts: Vassilis Xanthopoulos, Tadija Dragićević 3		Pts: Jordan Theodore 16; Rebs: Gašper Vidmar 7 Asts: Jordan Theodore 9	Arena: Nick Galis Hall

15 November 2016 5	ČEZ Nymburk (Czech Republic)	87–79	(Greece) Aris Thessaloniki	Nymburk
18:30	Scoring by quarter: 30–15, 15–19, 23–21, 19–24
	Pts: Howard Sant-Roos 23; Rebs: Howard Sant-Roos, Diamon Simpson 8 Asts: Howard Sant-Roos 4		Pts: Will Cummings 21; Rebs: (3 players) 5 Asts: Will Cummings, Michael Jenkins 4	Arena: Sportovní Centrum

23 November 2016 6	Fraport Skyliners (Germany)	81–74	(Greece) Aris Thessaloniki	Frankfurt
20:00	Scoring by quarter: 10–20, 24–17, 16–18, 31–19
	Pts: Antonio Graves 20; Rebs: Mike Morrison 10; Asts: Kwame Vaughn 5		Pts: Michael Jenkins 22; Rebs: Eric Buckner 12; Asts: Michael Jenkins 9	Arena: Fraport Arena

29 November 2016 7	Aris Thessaloniki (Greece)	62–65	(France) Monaco	Thessaloniki
21:00	Scoring by quarter: 12–21, 18–16, 17–9, 15–19
	Pts: Michael Jenkins 20; Rebs: Vlado Janković 12; Asts: (3 players) 2		Pts: Dee Bost, Billy Ouattara 13; Rebs: Amara Sy 8 Asts: Dee Bost 4	Arena: Nick Galis Hall

7 December 2016 8	Aris Thessaloniki (Greece)	72–54	(Slovenia) Helios Suns	Thessaloniki
21:00	Scoring by quarter: 16–18, 20–19, 17–9, 19–8
	Pts: Will Cummings 18; Rebs: Michalis Tsairelis 8 Asts: Vassilis Xanthopoulos 7		Pts: Maj Kovacevic 13; Rebs: Cory Remekun 8 Asts: Jan Močnik 4	Arena: Nick Galis Hall

13 December 2016 9	Bakken Bears (Denmark)	78–92	(Greece) Aris Thessaloniki	Aarhus
18:30	Scoring by quarter: 22–20, 14–19, 20–21, 22–32
	Pts: DeVaughn Akoon-Purcell 21; Rebs: DeVaughn Akoon-Purcell 8 Asts: (3 players) 3		Pts: Will Cummings 19; Rebs: Vassilis Xanthopoulos 7 Asts: Vassilis Xanthopoulos 5	Arena: Ceres Arena

20 December 2016 10	Aris Thessaloniki (Greece)	85–58	(Israel) Ironi Nahariya	Thessaloniki
21:00	Scoring by quarter: 25–16, 22–18, 14–9, 24–15
	Pts: Devyn Marble 16; Rebs: Vassilis Symtsak 7 Asts: Will Cummings 5		Pts: Yancy Gates 13; Rebs: Derwin Kitchen 5 Asts: Derwin Kitchen 4	Arena: Nick Galis Hall

3 January 2017 11	Banvit (Turkey)	95–94(OT)	(Greece) Aris Thessaloniki	Bandırma
20:00	Scoring by quarter: 21–16, 24–22, 17–29, 18–23, Overtime: 15–14
	Pts: Jordan Theodore 22; Rebs: Jordan Theodore 6 Asts: Jordan Theodore 14		Pts: Tadija Dragićević 20; Rebs: Michael Jenkins 6 Asts: Vassilis Xanthopoulos, Will Cummings 6	Arena: Kara Ali Acar Sport Hall

11 January 2017 12	Aris Thessaloniki (Greece)	83–79	(Czech Republic) ČEZ Nymburk	Thessaloniki
19:30	Scoring by quarter: 19–22, 26–22, 17–19, 21–16
	Pts: Michael Jenkins 21; Rebs: Will Cummings 6 Asts: Will Cummings 6		Pts: Vojtěch Hruban 20; Rebs: Howard Sant-Roos 7 Asts: (3 players) 2	Arena: Nick Galis Hall

17 January 2017 13	Aris Thessaloniki (Greece)	58–64	(Germany) Fraport Skyliners	Thessaloniki
21:00	Scoring by quarter: 19–13, 17–21, 11–17, 11–13
	Pts: Michalis Tsairelis 13; Rebs: Vassilis Symtsak 6 Asts: Vassilis Xanthopoulos 4		Pts: Kwame Vaughn, A. J. English 19; Rebs: Quantez Robertson 9 Asts: Kwame Vaughn, Quantez Robertson 3	Arena: Nick Galis Hall

25 January 2017 14	Monaco (France)	80–66	(Greece) Aris Thessaloniki	Monaco
20:00	Scoring by quarter: 18–23, 20–14, 22–17, 20–12
	Pts: Sergiy Gladyr, Billy Ouattara 15; Rebs: Bangaly Fofana 7 Asts: Jamal Shuler 6		Pts: Theodoros Zaras 15; Rebs: Justin Jackson 9 Asts: Vassilis Xanthopoulos 8	Arena: Salle Gaston Médecin

===== Results overview =====
Win Loss

Opposition	Home score	Away score	Double
(France) AS Monaco	62-65	66-80	128-145
(Denmark) Bakken Bears	82-66	92-78	174-144
(Turkey) Banvit	85-78	94-95	179-173
(Czech Republic) ČEZ Nymburk	83-79	79-87	162-166
(Germany) Fraport Skyliners	58-64	74-81	132-145
(Slovenia) Helios Suns	72-54	62-54	134-108
(Israel) Ironi Nahariya	85-58	85-53	170-111

==== Play-offs qualifiers ====
7 February 2016 1st Leg	Aris Thessaloniki (Greece)	71–52 (Series: 71-52)	(France) SIG Strasbourg	Thessaloniki
19:30	Scoring by quarter: 19-8, 19-20, 17-11, 16-13
	Pts: Will Cummings 21; Rebs: Justin Jackson 8 Asts: Will Cummings 5		Pts: Paul Lacombe 16; Rebs: Pape Sy, Romeo Travis 5 Asts: Jérémy Leloup 3	Arena: Nick Galis Hall

22 February 2017 2nd Leg	SIG Strasbourg (France)	81–70 (Series: 133-141)	(Greece) Aris Thessaloniki	Strasbourg
20:30	Scoring by quarter: 19-11, 20-17, 24-16, 18-26
	Pts: Erving Walker 19; Rebs: Paul Lacombe, Mouhammadou Jaiteh 7 Asts: Jérémy Leloup 5		Pts: Theodoros Zaras 19; Rebs: (3 players) 5 Asts: Will Cummings 4	Arena: Rhénus Sport

==== Round of 16 ====
1 March 2017 1st Leg	Aris Thessaloniki (Greece)	67–67 (Series: 67-67)	(France) ASVEL	Thessaloniki
19:30	Scoring by quarter: 17-21, 20-15, 17-13, 13-18
	Pts: Vassilis Kavvadas, Michalis Tsairelis 14; Rebs: Will Cummings 4 Asts: Vassilis Xanthopoulos 4		Pts: Adrian Uter 14; Rebs: Adrian Uter 12; Asts: Adrian Uter 3	Arena: Nick Galis Hall

7 March 2017 2nd Leg	ASVEL (France)	81–67 (Series: 148-134)	(Greece) Aris Thessaloniki	Villeurbanne
20:30	Scoring by quarter: 22-25, 26-8, 21-10, 12-24
	Pts: Walter Hodge 19; Rebs: Adrian Uter, Darryl Watkins 6 Asts: Walter Hodge 6		Pts: Will Cummings 17; Rebs: Vassilis Symtsak 11; Asts: Vassilis Xanthopoulos 5	Arena: L'Astroballe

== Statistics ==
=== Basket League ===
==== Regular season ====
#	Player	GP	PTS	PPG	TR	RPG	DR	OR	AST	APG	STL	SPG	BLK	BPG
0	(United States) Justin Jackson	11	52	4.73	40	3.64	26	14	8	0.73	2	0.18	12	1.09
4	(Greece) Vassilis Xanthopoulos	26	109	4.19	68	2.62	59	9	71	2.73	44	1.69	1	0.04
5	(Greece) Panagiotis Kalaitzakis	1	2	2.0	0	0.0	0	0	0	0.0	0	0.0	0	0.0
7	(Greece) Dimitris Flionis	18	37	2.06	20	1.11	15	5	8	0.44	8	0.44	1	0.06
9	(Greece) Michalis Tsairelis	24	117	4.88	48	2.0	32	16	16	0.67	9	0.38	1	0.04
12	(United States) Will Cummings	25	367	14.68	97	3.88	79	18	82	3.28	32	1.28	1	0.04
13	(Greece) Theodoros Zaras	26	198	7.62	41	1.58	33	8	22	0.85	7	0.27	0	0.0
14	(Greece) Vassilis Christidis	6	11	1.83	7	1.17	5	2	0	0.0	1	0.17	0	0.0
16	(Greece) Spyros Mourtos	24	63	2.63	60	2.5	42	18	21	0.88	9	0.38	4	0.17
17	(Greece) Vassilis Symtsak	24	84	3.5	83	3.46	47	36	21	0.88	5	0.21	5	0.21
28	(Greece) Vlado Janković	21	179	8.52	83	3.95	61	22	52	2.48	14	0.67	3	0.14
31	(Georgia (country)) Viktor Sanikidze	1	3	3.0	5	5.0	4	1	1	1.0	0	0.0	1	1.0
33	(Greece) Vassilis Kavvadas	18	175	9.72	67	3.72	36	31	2	0.11	1	0.06	17	0.94
34	(Serbia) Tadija Dragićević	23	234	10.17	101	4.39	80	21	40	1.74	9	0.39	1	0.04
-	(Greece) Stelios Poulianitis	1	0	0.0	0	0.0	0	0	0	0.0	0	0.0	1	1.0
-	(United States) Devyn Marble	10	76	7.6	37	3.7	28	9	14	1.4	5	0.5	2	0.2
-	(United States) Eric Buckner	10	62	6.2	49	4.9	35	14	3	0.3	2	0.2	12	1.2
-	(United States) Jamon Gordon	3	14	4.67	7	2.33	6	1	5	1.67	2	0.67	1	0.33
-	(United States) Michael Jenkins	19	189	9.95	55	2.89	49	6	41	2.16	17	0.89	2	0.11
	Team totals	26	1972	75.85	868	33.38	637	231	407	15.65	167	6.42	66	2.54

===== Shooting =====
#	Player	GP	FT	FT%	2P	2P%	3P	3P%
0	(United States) Justin Jackson	11	10/19	52.63	21/47	44.68	0/0	0.0
4	(Greece) Vassilis Xanthopoulos	26	22/31	70.97	12/31	38.71	21/64	32.81
5	(Greece) Panagiotis Kalaitzakis	1	0/0	0.0	1/1	100.0	0/0	0.0
7	(Greece) Dimitris Flionis	18	8/12	66.67	4/10	40.0	7/10	70.0
9	(Greece) Michalis Tsairelis	24	34/48	70.83	34/69	49.28	5/25	20.0
12	(United States) Will Cummings	25	86/110	78.18	88/170	51.76	35/96	36.46
13	(Greece) Theodoros Zaras	26	28/32	87.5	28/64	43.75	38/100	38.0
14	(Greece) Vassilis Christidis	6	1/3	33.33	5/7	71.43	0/0	0.0
16	(Greece) Spyros Mourtos	24	9/18	50.0	24/52	46.15	2/21	9.52
17	(Greece) Vassilis Symtsak	24	9/19	47.37	36/59	61.02	1/2	50.0
28	(Greece) Vlado Janković	21	40/48	83.33	41/90	45.56	19/70	27.14
31	(Georgia (country)) Viktor Sanikidze	1	1/4	25.0	1/2	50.0	0/0	0.0
33	(Greece) Vassilis Kavvadas	18	39/78	50.0	68/97	70.10	0/0	0.0
34	(Serbia) Tadija Dragićević	23	46/60	76.67	52/89	58.43	28/93	30.11
-	(Greece) Stelios Poulianitis	1	0/0	0.0	0/0	0.0	0/1	0.0
-	(United States) Devyn Marble	10	11/11	100.0	25/45	55.56	5/30	16.67
-	(United States) Eric Buckner	10	14/30	46.67	24/45	53.33	0/0	0.0
-	(United States) Jamon Gordon	3	2/2	100.0	3/11	27.27	2/2	100.0
-	(United States) Michael Jenkins	19	24/32	75.0	30/67	44.78	35/89	39.33
	Team totals	26	384/557	68.94	497/956	51.99	198/603	32.84

Last updated: 13 April 2017
Source: ESAKE

==== Playoffs ====
#	Player	GP	PTS	PPG	TR	RPG	DR	OR	AST	APG	STL	SPG	BLK	BPG
0	(United States) Justin Jackson	3	5	1.67	7	2.33	4	3	2	0.67	2	0.67	2	0.67
1	(United States) Antwan Scott	7	20	2.86	13	1.86	11	2	9	1.29	5	0.71	0	0.0
4	(Greece) Vassilis Xanthopoulos	7	46	6.57	19	2.71	11	8	25	3.57	16	2.29	0	0.0
7	(Greece) Dimitris Flionis	6	9	1.5	8	1.33	5	3	7	1.17	2	0.33	0	0.0
9	(Greece) Michalis Tsairelis	7	59	8.43	23	3.29	16	7	5	0.71	2	0.29	0	0.0
12	(United States) Will Cummings	6	83	13.83	15	2.5	10	5	13	2.17	1	0.17	0	0.0
13	(Greece) Theodoros Zaras	6	51	8.5	14	2.33	13	1	2	0.5	2	0.33	0	0.0
14	(Greece) Vassilis Christidis	5	8	1.6	13	2.6	6	7	0	0.0	1	0.2	0	0.0
16	(Greece) Spyros Mourtos	7	46	6.57	13	1.86	9	4	3	0.43	3	0.43	1	0.14
17	(Greece) Vassilis Symtsak	6	16	2.67	37	6.17	28	9	6	1.0	4	0.67	0	0.0
28	(Greece) Vlado Janković	7	80	11.43	43	6.14	27	16	21	3.0	9	1.29	0	0.0
33	(Greece) Vassilis Kavvadas	6	42	7.0	25	4.17	20	5	1	0.17	1	0.17	9	1.5
34	(Serbia) Tadija Dragićević	5	43	8.6	14	2.8	11	3	5	1.0	1	0.2	1	0.2
	Team totals	7	508	72.57	244	34.86	171	73	100	14.29	49	7	13	1.86

===== Shooting =====
#	Player	GP	FT	FT%	2P	2P%	3P	3P%
0	(United States) Justin Jackson	3	1/2	50.0	2/4	50.0	0/0	0.0
1	(United States) Antwan Scott	7	0/0	0.0	7/11	63.64	2/13	15.38
4	(Greece) Vassilis Xanthopoulos	7	10/14	71.43	6/10	60.0	8/28	28.57
7	(Greece) Dimitris Flionis	6	2/2	100.0	2/9	22.22	1/6	16.67
9	(Greece) Michalis Tsairelis	7	22/32	68.75	8/20	40.0	7/18	38.89
12	(United States) Will Cummings	6	18/24	75.0	22/50	44.0	7/20	35.0
13	(Greece) Theodoros Zaras	6	9/12	75.0	12/26	46.15	6/19	31.58
14	(Greece) Vassilis Christidis	5	2/4	50.0	3/12	25.0	0/0	0.0
16	(Greece) Spyros Mourtos	7	14/18	77.78	13/26	50.0	2/8	25.0
17	(Greece) Vassilis Symtsak	6	2/3	66.67	7/17	41.18	0/1	0.0
28	(Greece) Vlado Janković	7	20/28	71.43	21/47	44.68	6/25	24.0
33	(Greece) Vassilis Kavvadas	6	8/17	47.06	17/36	47.22	0/0	0.0
34	(Serbia) Tadija Dragićević	5	3/5	60.0	5/11	45.45	10/20	50.0
	Team totals	7	111/161	68.94	125/279	44.8	49/158	31.01

Last updated: 31 May 2017
Source: ESAKE

=== Champions League ===
#	Player	GP	PTS	PPG	TR	RPG	DR	OR	AST	APG	STL	SPG	BLK	BPG
0	(United States) Justin Jackson	5	32	6.4	29	5.8	16	13	1	0.2	4	0.8	7	1.4
4	(Greece) Vassilis Xanthopoulos	18	59	3.28	40	2.22	33	7	63	3.5	26	1.44	0	0.0
7	(Greece) Dimitris Flionis	13	9	0.69	6	0.46	6	0	5	0.38	3	0.17	1	0.08
9	(Greece) Michalis Tsairelis	17	103	6.06	38	2.24	27	11	4	0.24	3	0.18	3	0.18
12	(United States) Will Cummings	18	265	14.72	68	3.78	53	15	55	3.06	31	1.72	1	0.06
13	(Greece) Theodoros Zaras	17	138	8.12	16	0.94	12	4	9	0.53	3	0.18	0	0.0
14	(Greece) Vassilis Christidis	2	1	0.5	1	0.5	1	0	0	0.0	0	0.0	0	0.0
16	(Greece) Spyros Mourtos	18	29	1.61	32	1.78	27	5	21	1.17	10	0.56	5	0.28
17	(Greece) Vassilis Symtsak	16	42	2.63	60	3.75	41	19	8	0.5	8	0.5	2	0.13
28	(Greece) Vlado Janković	12	109	9.08	49	4.08	38	11	16	1.33	13	1.08	3	0.25
33	(Greece) Vassilis Kavvadas	10	79	7.9	32	3.2	19	13	4	0.4	3	0.3	17	1.7
34	(Serbia) Tadija Dragićević	16	131	8.19	45	2.81	37	8	23	1.44	10	0.63	2	0.13
-	(United States) Devyn Marble	8	85	10.63	26	3.25	21	5	9	1.13	13	1.63	0	0.0
-	(United States) Eric Buckner	9	64	7.11	49	5.44	26	23	5	0.56	4	0.44	12	1.33
-	(United States) Jamon Gordon	4	6	1.5	4	1.0	4	0	4	1.0	5	1.25	0	0.0
-	(United States) Michael Jenkins	17	201	11.82	51	3.0	42	9	39	2.29	19	1.12	0	0.0
	Team				65		40	25						
	Team totals	18	1353	75.17	611	33.94	443	168	266	14.78	155	8.61	53	2.94

==== Shooting ====
#	Player	GP	FT	FT%	2P	2P%	3P	3P%
0	(United States) Justin Jackson	5	6/11	54.55	13/20	65.0	0/0	0.0
4	(Greece) Vassilis Xanthopoulos	18	10/14	71.43	11/14	78.57	9/21	42.86
7	(Greece) Dimitris Flionis	13	4/6	66.67	1/7	14.29	1/4	25.0
9	(Greece) Michalis Tsairelis	17	24/30	80.0	29/56	51.79	7/15	46.67
12	(United States) Will Cummings	18	68/93	73.12	67/142	47.18	21/67	31.34
13	(Greece) Theodoros Zaras	11	19/22	86.36	28/51	54.9	21/60	35.0
14	(Greece) Vassilis Christidis	2	1/2	50.0	0/1	0.0	0/0	0.0
16	(Greece) Spyros Mourtos	18	8/14	57.14	9/21	42.86	1/6	16.67
17	(Greece) Vassilis Symtsak	16	8/9	88.89	17/30	56.67	0/2	0.0
28	(Greece) Vlado Janković	12	25/30	83.33	21/45	46.67	14/42	33.33
33	(Greece) Vassilis Kavvadas	10	19/34	55.88	30/45	66.67	0/0	0.0
34	(Serbia) Tadija Dragićević	16	28/37	75.68	26/68	38.24	17/48	35.42
-	(United States) Devyn Marble	8	11/21	52.38	16/36	44.44	14/38	36.84
-	(United States) Eric Buckner	9	8/17	47.06	28/43	65.12	0/0	0.0
-	(United States) Jamon Gordon	4	1/2	50.0	1/2	50.0	1/2	50.0
-	(United States) Michael Jenkins	17	26/33	78.79	38/69	50.72	33/90	36.67
	Team totals	18	266/375	70.93	335/650	51.54	139/395	35.19

Last updated: 7 March 2017
Source: BCL
