= 2016–17 Greek Basketball Cup =

Greek Basketball Cup
- Season: 2016–17
- Duration: September 17, 2016 – February 18, 2017
- Teams: 30

Finals
- Champions: Panathinaikos (18th title)
- Runners-up: Aris
- Finals MVP: (Dominican Republic) James Feldeine

The 2016–17 Greek Basketball Cup was the 42nd edition of Greece's top-tier level professional national domestic basketball cup competition. The competition started on September 17, 2016, and ended with the Final on February 18, 2016. Panathinaikos won the competition.

== Format ==
The top six placed teams from the top-tier level Greek Basket League 2015–16 season, had an automatic bye to the quarterfinals. While the eight lower placed teams from the Greek Basket League 2015–16 season, along with the 16 teams from the 2nd-tier level Greek A2 Basket League 2016–17 season, played in preliminary rounds, competing for the other two quarterfinals places. The quarterfinals and onward rounds were played under a single elimination format.

== Bracket ==
Quarterfinals
5 October
Olympiacos | 99
Kolossos H Hotels | 48
5 October
Panathinaikos | 88
PAOK | 69
5 October
Aris | 98
Kymis Seajets | 67
6 October
AEK | 98
Koroivos | 57

Semifinals
16 January
Olympiacos | 67
Panathinaikos | 77
14 January
Aris | 77
AEK | 76

Final
18 February
Panathinaikos | 68
Aris | 59

== Quarterfinals ==
5 October 2016

| Aris | 98–67 | Kymis Seajets |

Alexandreio Melathron Nick Galis Hall, Thessaloniki

5 October 2016

| Panathinaikos | 88–69 | PAOK |

Nikos Galis Olympic Indoor Hall, Athens

5 October 2016

| Olympiacos | 99–48 | Kolossos H Hotels |

Peace and Friendship Stadium, Piraeus

6 October 2016

| AEK | 98–57 | Koroivos |

Nikos Galis Olympic Indoor Hall, Athens

== Semifinals ==
14 January 2017

| Aris | 77–76 | AEK |

Alexandreio Melathron Nick Galis Hall, Thessaloniki

16 January 2017

| Olympiacos | 67–77 | Panathinaikos |

Peace and Friendship Stadium, Piraeus

== Final ==
The Final started one hour later than planned after Aris fans tried to break into the Alexandreio Melathron Nick Galis Hall without buying tickets.

| 18 February 2017 | Panathinaikos | 68–59 | Aris | Thessaloniki |
| | Scoring by quarter: 18–10, 11–17, 21–10, 18–22 |
| | Pts: Feldeine 18; Rebs: Gabriel 8 Asts: Calathes 3 | | Pts: Cummings 20; Rebs: Jenkins 6 Asts: Jenkins 2 | Arena: Alexandreio Melathron Nick Galis Hall |

| Starters: | | | Pts | Reb | Ast |
|---|---|---|---|---|---|
| PG | 33 | (Greece) Nick Calathes | 15 | 4 | 3 |
| SG | 12 | (Dominican Republic) James Feldeine | 18 | 2 | 2 |
| SF | 15 | (Greece) Vassilis Charalampopoulos | 0 | 1 | 0 |
| PF | 21 | (United States) Kenny Gabriel | 3 | 8 | 1 |
| C | 0 | (United States) Chris Singleton | 9 | 4 | 1 |
| Reserves: | | | | | |
| SF | 3 | (United States) K.C. Rivers | 5 | 3 | 1 |
| PG | 5 | (United States) Mike James | 9 | 1 | 0 |
| PG | 7 | (Greece) Lefteris Bochoridis | DNP | | |
| PF | 9 | (Greece) Antonis Fotsis | 5 | 5 | 0 |
| SG | 11 | (Greece) Nikos Pappas | 0 | 0 | 0 |
| SF | 25 | (Italy) Alessandro Gentile | 4 | 3 | 0 |
| C | 29 | (Greece) Ioannis Bourousis | 0 | 4 | 0 |
Head coach:
(Spain) Xavi Pascual

| Panathinaikos | Aris |

2017 Greek Cup champions
Panathinaikos
18th title

| Starters: | | | Pts | Reb | Ast |
|---|---|---|---|---|---|
| PG | 20 | (United States) Will Cummings | 20 | 2 | 1 |
| SG | 11 | (United States) Michael Jenkins | 12 | 6 | 2 |
| SF | 28 | (Greece) Vlado Janković | 2 | 5 | 1 |
| PF | 34 | (Serbia) Tadija Dragićević | 2 | 3 | 1 |
| C | 33 | (Greece) Vassilis Kavvadas | 6 | 3 | 1 |
| Reserves: | | | | | |
| C | 0 | (United States) Justin Jackson | 2 | 2 | 0 |
| PG | 4 | (Greece) Vassilis Xanthopoulos | 0 | 3 | 0 |
| PF | 9 | (Greece) Michalis Tsairelis | 9 | 3 | 0 |
| SG | 13 | (Greece) Theodoros Zaras | 0 | 0 | 1 |
| SF | 16 | (Greece) Spyros Mourtos | 2 | 0 | 0 |
| C | 17 | (Greece) Vassilis Symtsak | 4 | 6 | 1 |
| SG | 22 | (United States) Jamon Gordon | 0 | 3 | 0 |
Head coach:
(Greece) Dimitrios Priftis

== Awards ==
=== Most Valuable Player ===
| Player | Team |
|---|---|
| (Dominican Republic) James Feldeine | Panathinaikos |

=== Finals Top Scorer ===
| Player | Team |
|---|---|
| (United States) Will Cummings | Aris |
