= 2017 Greek Basket League Playoffs =

The 2017 Greek Basket League Playoffs included the top eight place finishing teams of the 2016–17 Greek Basket League regular season.

== Bracket ==
Teams in bold won the playoff series. Numbers to the left of each team indicate the team's original playoff seeding. Numbers to the right indicate the score of each playoff game.

First round 19–26 April
5 **PAOK**	**2**
8 Lavrio DHI	0
6 **Rethymno Cretan Kings**	**2**
7 Kolossos H Hotels	1

Quarterfinals; 29 April–4 May
4 **Aris**	**2**
5 PAOK	0
3 **AEK**	**2**
6 Rethymno Cretan Kings	0

Semifinals; 10-22 May
1 **Olympiacos**	**3**
4 Aris	0
2 **Panathinaikos Superfoods**	**3**
3 AEK	1

Finals; 28 May–11 June
1 Olympiacos	2
2 **Panathinaikos Superfoods**	**3**
Third Place
3 **AEK**	**3**
4 Aris	0

== First round ==
In the first round, the teams that finished in places 5 to 8 of the regular season standings, playing against each other have to win two games to win the series. Thus, if one team wins two games before all three games have been played, the remaining game is omitted. The team that finished in the higher regular season place, plays the first and the third (if necessary) game of the series at home.

Team 1	Agg.	Team 2	Game 1	Game 2	Game 3
**PAOK**	2–0	Lavrio DHI	82–65	78–68	—
**Rethymno Cretan Kings**	2–1	Kolossos H Hotels	84–71	73–78	69–55

=== Game 1 ===
19 April 2017	**PAOK**	**82**–65	Lavrio DHI	Thessaloniki
17:00 (EET)	Scoring by quarter: 16–**19**, **25**–12, **20**–18, **21**–16
	Pts: McFadden 18; Rebs: Clanton 11; Asts: Clanton 5 PIR: Clanton 24	Report	Pts: Gray 15; Rebs: Evans 7 Asts: Nixon 3 PIR: Bolds 13	Arena: P.A.O.K. Sports Arena; Referees: Athanasios Deslis, Stefanos Maglogiannis, Vaso Tsaroucha

20 April 2017	**Rethymno Cretan Kings**	**84**–71(OT)	Kolossos H Hotels	Rethymno
17:00 (EET)	Scoring by quarter: 14–**22**, 10–**17**, **21**–12, **18**–12, Overtime: **21**–8
	Pts: Fitzpatrick, Giannopoulos 20; Rebs: Arnold, Fitzpatrick 9 Asts: Talton 10; PIR: Fitzpatrick 20	Report	Pts: Reddic 20; Rebs: Saloustros, Vasilopoulos 10; Asts: Hall 9 PIR: Reddic 22	Arena: Melina Merkouri Indoor Hall; Referees: Christos Panagiotou, Kiriakos Pantelidis, Vassilis Mpikas

=== Game 2 ===
22 April 2017	Lavrio DHI	68–**78**	**PAOK**	Laurium
17:00 (EET)	Scoring by quarter: **25**–13, 14–**19**, 17–**30**, 12–**16**
	Pts: Gray 19; Rebs: Evans 7 Asts: Nixon 6 PIR: Gray 17	Report	Pts: Clanton 15; Rebs: Clanton 9 Asts: Koniaris 5 PIR: Clanton 25	Arena: Lavrio Indoor Hall; Referees: Alexandros Psarianos, Dimitris Tzafleris, Georgios Theonas

23 April 2017	**Kolossos H Hotels**	**78**–73	Rethymno Cretan Kings	Rhodes
17:00 (EET)	Scoring by quarter: 14–**16**, 18–**23**, **25**–19, **21**–15
	Pts: Vasilopoulos 18; Rebs: Saloustros 10; Asts: Hall 9 PIR: Chuku 20	Report	Pts: Talton 21; Rebs: Kamperidis 8 Asts: Razis, Talton 3 PIR: Talton 24	Arena: Venetokleio Indoor Hall; Referees: Georgios Andrikopoulos, Kostas Poursanidis, K. Georgiadis

=== Game 3 ===
26 April 2017	**Rethymno Cretan Kings**	**69**–55	Kolossos H Hotels	Rethymno
17:00 (EET)	Scoring by quarter: **22**–9, 15–**23**, 15–15, **17**–8
	Pts: Giannopoulos, Lemon 20; Rebs: Fitzpatrick 14; Asts: Talton 4 PIR: Giannopoulos 24	Report	Pts: Vasilopoulos 15; Rebs: Saloustros 6 Asts: Hall, Releford, Vasilopoulos 3 PIR: Watson 13	Arena: Melina Merkouri Indoor Hall; Referees: Dimitris Mpitis, Vasilis Tsonos, Andreas Vardalos

== Quarterfinals ==
In the quarterfinals, teams playing against each other have to win two games to win the series. Thus, if one team wins two games before all three games have been played, the remaining game is omitted. The team that finished in the higher regular season place, is going to play the first and the third (if necessary) game of the series at home.

Team 1	Agg.	Team 2	Game 1	Game 2	Game 3
**Aris**	2–0	PAOK	69–65	75–84	—
**AEK**	2–0	Rethymno Cretan Kings	90–78	81–70	—

=== Game 1 ===
29 April 2017	**Aris**	**69**–65(OT)	PAOK	Thessaloniki
19:00 (EET)	Scoring by quarter: 16–**20**, 17–17, **14**–13, **14**–11, Overtime: **8**–4
	Pts: Xanthopoulos 16; Rebs: Symtsak 12; Asts: Janković, Xanthopoulos 4 PIR: Janković 18	Report	Pts: Sobey 20; Rebs: Clanton 11; Asts: Koniaris 4 PIR: Clanton, Sobey 14	Arena: Nick Galis Hall; Referees: Anastasios Piloidis, Georgios Poursanidis, Stefanos Maglogiannis

30 April 2017	**AEK**	**90**–78	Rethymno Cretan Kings	Athens
17:00 (EET)	Scoring by quarter: **19**–14, **22**–20, **25**–20, 24–24
	Pts: Ukić 24; Rebs: Mavroeidis 10; Asts: Ukić 8 PIR: Ukić 38	Report	Pts: Lemon 20; Rebs: Kottas 7 Asts: Talton 4 PIR: Arnold 21	Arena: O.A.C.A. Referees: Nickolaos Somos, Dimitris Mpitis, Argiris Kaldiris

=== Game 2 ===
3 May 2017	PAOK	75–**84**	**Aris**	Thessaloniki
19:00 (EET)	Scoring by quarter: 18–**25**, 22–**27**, **19**–11, 16–21
	Pts: Peiners 14; Rebs: Clanton 15; Asts: Koniaris, Tsochlas 3 PIR: Clanton 22	Report	Pts: Dragićević 21; Rebs: Kavvadas 6 Asts: Xanthopoulos 5 PIR: Dragićević 21	Arena: P.A.O.K. Sports Arena; Referees: Antonis Anastopoulos, Alexandros Psarianos, Dimitris Tzafleris

4 May 2017	Rethymno Cretan Kings	70–**81**	**AEK**	Rethymno
17:00 (EET)	Scoring by quarter: **23**–19, **27**–21, 6–**24**, 14–**17**
	Pts: Lemon 14; Rebs: Kamperidis 7 Asts: Talton 9 PIR: Kamperidis 19	Report	Pts: Ukić 18; Rebs: Milošević 9 Asts: McGrath 5 PIR: Ukić 22	Arena: Melina Merkouri Indoor Hall; Referees: Charalampos Karakatsounis, Panagiotis Diamantis, Georgios Andrikopoulos

== Semifinals ==
In the semifinals, teams playing against each other have to win three games to win the series. Thus, if one team wins three games before all five games have been played, the remaining games are omitted. The team that finished in the higher regular season place, is going to play the first, the third and the fifth (if necessary) game of the series at home.

Team 1	Agg.	Team 2	Game 1	Game 2	Game 3	Game 4	Game 5
**Olympiacos**	3–0	Aris	84–54	84–77	79–65	—	—
**Panathinaikos Superfoods**	3–1	AEK	80–70	70–71	81–72	105–67	—

=== Game 1 ===
10 May 2017	**Olympiacos**	**84**–54	Aris	Piraeus
19:00 (EET)	Scoring by quarter: **21**–17, **23**–14, **20**–7, **20**–16
	Pts: Papanikolaou 17; Rebs: Agravanis 8 Asts: Green 6 PIR: Papanikolaou 24	Report	Pts: Kavvadas 14; Rebs: Kavvadas, Tsairelis 6 Asts: Cummings 3 PIR: Kavvadas 13	Arena: Peace and Friendship Stadium; Referees: Chrysostomos Schinas, Athanasios Deslis, Dimitris Mpitis

11 May 2017	**Panathinaikos Superfoods**	**80**–70	AEK	Athens
19:00 (EET)	Scoring by quarter: **23**–15, 12–**24**, **25**–11, 20–20
	Pts: Calathes 23; Rebs: Bourousis 11; Asts: Calathes 5 PIR: Calathes 25	Report	Pts: Mavroeidis 18; Rebs: Dixon 7 Asts: McGrath 4 PIR: Dixon, Mavroeidis 18	Arena: O.A.C.A. Referees: Anastasios Piloidis, Anastasios Manos, Vasilis Tsonos

=== Game 2 ===
13 May 2017	Aris	77–**84**	**Olympiacos**	Thessaloniki
17:00 (EET)	Scoring by quarter: 14–**24**, **27**–19, 14–**24**, **22**–17
	Pts: Cummings 16; Rebs: Symtsak 9 Asts: Janković 3 PIR: Dragićević 16	Report	Pts: Papanikolaou 23; Rebs: Birch 14; Asts: Spanoulis 8 PIR: Papanikolaou 28	Arena: Nick Galis Hall; Referees: Charalampos Karakatsounis, Alexandros Psarianos, Kiriakos Pantelidis

14 May 2017	**AEK**	**71**–70	Panathinaikos Superfoods	Athens
17:00 (EET)	Scoring by quarter: 17–**22**, 20–**22**, **19**–13, **15**–13
	Pts: Milošević 14; Rebs: Mavroeidis, Milošević, Ukić 6 Asts: Dixon 5 PIR: Mavroeidis, Milošević 20	Report	Pts: Singleton 19; Rebs: Singleton 11; Asts: Calathes 4 PIR: Singleton 28	Arena: O.A.C.A. Referees: Panagiotis Anastopoulos, Nickolaos Somos, Stefanos Maglogiannis

=== Game 3 ===
18 May 2017	**Panathinaikos Superfoods**	**81**–72	AEK	Athens
19:00 (EET)	Scoring by quarter: **18**–12, 14–**19**, 19–**21**, **30**–20
	Pts: Calathes 26; Rebs: Calathes 6 Asts: Calathes 6 PIR: Calathes 27	Report	Pts: Ukić 14; Rebs: Milošević 8 Asts: Ukić 5 PIR: Ukić 14	Arena: O.A.C.A. Referees: Chrysostomos Schinas, Georgios Poursanidis, Christos Panagiotou

25 May 2017	**Olympiacos**	**79**–65	Aris	Piraeus
19:00 (EET)	Scoring by quarter: **22**–13, **17**–12, **26**–24, 14–**16**
	Pts: Papapetrou 18; Rebs: Young 8 Asts: Spanoulis 6 PIR: Papapetrou 20	Report	Pts: Cummings 21; Rebs: Janković 6 Asts: Janković 5 PIR: Cummings 12	Arena: Peace and Friendship Stadium; Referees: Panagiotis Diamantis, Dimitris Tzafleris, Kostas Poursanidis

=== Game 4 ===
22 May 2017	AEK	67–**105**	**Panathinaikos Superfoods**	Athens
19:00 (EET)	Scoring by quarter: 11–**25**, 18–**24**, 18–**24**, 20–**32**
	Pts: Ukić 16; Rebs: Elonu 5 Asts: Dixon 4 PIR: Mavroeidis 10	Report	Pts: Calathes 17; Rebs: Bourousis 9 Asts: Calathes 9 PIR: Calathes 26	Arena: O.A.C.A. Referees: Charalampos Karakatsounis, Anastasios Manos, Georgios Andrikopoulos

== Third place ==
In the series for the third place, teams playing against each other have to win three games to win the series. Thus, if one team wins three games before all five games have been played, the remaining games are omitted. The team that finished in the higher regular season place, is going to play the first, the third and the fifth (if necessary) game of the series at home.

Team 1	Agg.	Team 2	Game 1	Game 2	Game 3	Game 4	Game 5
**AEK**	3–0	Aris	90–74	91–85	71–60	—	—

=== Game 1 ===
28 May 2017	**AEK**	**90**–74	Aris	Athens
18:00 (EET)	Scoring by quarter: 23–**24**, **25**–17, **20**–16, **22**–17
	Pts: Milošević 16; Rebs: Milošević 12; Asts: Dixon 9 PIR: Elonu 23	Report	Pts: Janković 17; Rebs: Janković 11; Asts: Xanthopoulos 5 PIR: Janković 23	Arena: O.A.C.A. Referees: Anastasios Piloidis, Panagiotis Diamantis, Dimitris Tzafleris

=== Game 2 ===
31 May 2017	Aris	85–**91**	**AEK**	Thessaloniki
17:30 (EET)	Scoring by quarter: 21–**22**, **30**–21, 17–**20**, 17–**28**
	Pts: Janković, Mourtos 18; Rebs: Janković 12; Asts: Xanthopoulos 7 PIR: Mourtos 20	Report	Pts: Larentzakis, Mavrokefalidis 19; Rebs: Dixon, Milošević 5 Asts: Dixon 9 PIR: Larentzakis 20	Arena: Nick Galis Hall; Referees: Chrysostomos Schinas, Dimitris Mpitis, Stefanos Maglogiannis

=== Game 3 ===
3 June 2017	**AEK**	**71**–60	Aris	Athens
17:00 (EET)	Scoring by quarter: 18–**19**, **24**–18, **14**–8, 15–15
	Pts: Dixon 19; Rebs: Elonu 9 Asts: Dixon 6 PIR: Elonu 20	Report	Pts: Kavvadas, Tsairelis 11; Rebs: Mourtos 10; Asts: Flionis 4 PIR: Mourtos 13	Arena: O.A.C.A. Referees: Panagiotis Anastopoulos, Georgios Poursanidis, Kostas Poursanidis

== Finals ==
In the finals, teams playing against each other have to win three games to win the series. Thus, if one team wins three games before all five games have been played, the remaining games are omitted. The team that finished in the higher regular season place, is going to play the first, the third and the fifth (if necessary) game of the series at home.

Team 1	Agg.	Team 2	Game 1	Game 2	Game 3	Game 4	Game 5
Olympiacos	2–3	**Panathinaikos Superfoods**	63–58	80–84	64–62	58–71	51–66

=== Game 1 ===
28 May 2017	**Olympiacos**	**63**–58	Panathinaikos Superfoods	Piraeus
21:00 (EET)	Scoring by quarter: **19**–10, 16–**23**, 13–**17**, **15**–8
	Pts: Milutinov, Printezis 12; Rebs: Green, Papanikolaou 7 Asts: Spanoulis 10; PIR: Spanoulis 21	Report	Pts: Rivers 16; Rebs: Bourousis 11; Asts: Calathes 5 PIR: Bourousis 16	Arena: Peace and Friendship Stadium; Referees: Antonis Anastopoulos, Nickolaos Somos, Alexandros Psarianos

=== Game 2 ===
1 June 2017	**Panathinaikos Superfoods**	**84**–80	Olympiacos	Athens
21:00 (EET)	Scoring by quarter: 17–**20**, **24**–19, **18**–14, 25–**27**
	Pts: Pappas 16; Rebs: Calathes 10; Asts: Calathes 3 PIR: Pappas 20	Report	Pts: Green 21; Rebs: Birch 7 Asts: Mantzaris 6 PIR: Green 17	Arena: O.A.C.A. Referees: Anastasios Piloidis, Anastasios Manos, Christos Panagiotou

=== Game 3 ===
4 June 2017	**Olympiacos**	**64**–62	Panathinaikos Superfoods	Piraeus
21:00 (EET)	Scoring by quarter: 16–16, **20**–17, 7–**10**, **21**–19
	Pts: Milutinov 14; Rebs: Printezis 7 Asts: Printezis 7 PIR: Milutinov 20	Report	Pts: James 16; Rebs: Bourousis 6 Asts: Calathes, James 3 PIR: James 15	Arena: Peace and Friendship Stadium; Referees: Chrysostomos Schinas, Charalampos Karakatsounis, Athanasios Deslis

=== Game 4 ===
8 June 2017	**Panathinaikos Superfoods**	**71**–58	Olympiacos	Athens
21:00 (EET)	Scoring by quarter: **18**–11, **21**–17, **20**–11, 12–**19**
	Pts: Calathes, Singleton 14; Rebs: Singleton 9 Asts: James 5 PIR: James, Singleton 19	Report	Pts: Green 20; Rebs: Papanikolaou 8 Asts: Spanoulis 5 PIR: Green 16	Arena: O.A.C.A. Referees: Panagiotis Anastopoulos, Georgios Poursanidis, Georgios Andrikopoulos

=== Game 5 ===
11 June 2017	Olympiacos	51–**66**	**Panathinaikos Superfoods**	Piraeus
21:00 (EET)	Scoring by quarter: **17**–14, 10–**22**, 10–**21**, **14**–9
		Report		Arena: Peace and Friendship Stadium
