= 2014–15 Aris Thessaloniki B.C. season =

Greek basketball team season

Aris B.C.
2014–15 season
- Head coach: Dimitrios Priftis
- Greek Basket League: 4th (4th in Regular season)
- Greek Cup: Quarterfinals

In the 2014–15 Aris Thessaloniki B.C. season, Aris Thessaloniki finished in 4th place in the Greek Basket League, and reached the quarterfinals of the Greek Cup. Aris Thessaloniki did not participate in any European-wide competition.

== Roster ==
#	Position	Player	Height	Born
4	PG/SG	(Bosnia and Herzegovina) Muhamed Pašalić	1.93 m (6 ft 4 in)	August 27, 1987
9	SG/SF	(United States) Lamarcus Reed	1.96 m (6 ft 5 in)	October 31, 1988
11	PG?SG	(Greece) Stelios Poulianitis	1.90 m (6 ft 3 in)	April 3, 1995
12	C	(Greece) Kostas Charissis	2.12 m (6 ft 11 in) )	November 12, 1979
16	SG/SF	(Greece) Spyros Mourtos	1.98 m (6 ft 6 in)	December 5, 1990
17	PF/C	(Greece) Vassilis Symtsak	2.07 m (6 ft 9 in)	March 3, 1981

== Competitions ==
=== Overview ===
==== Total Overview ====
Competition	Record							
Competition	Pld	W	D	L	PF	PA	PD	Win %
Greek Basket League	37	20	0	17	2,620	2,713	−93	54.05
Greek Basketball Cup	4	3	0	1	305	259	+46	75.00
Total	41	23	0	18	2,925	2,972	−47	56.10

Last updated: 17 June 2015
Source: Competitions

==== Greek Basket League ====
Competition	Record							
Competition	Pld	W	D	L	PF	PA	PD	Win %
Regular season	26	16	0	10	1,886	1,847	+39	61.54
Playoffs	11	4	0	7	734	866	−132	36.36
Total	37	20	0	17	2,620	2,713	−93	54.05

Last updated: 17 June 2015
Source: Competitions
