= James Feldeine =

American-Dominican basketball player (born 1988)

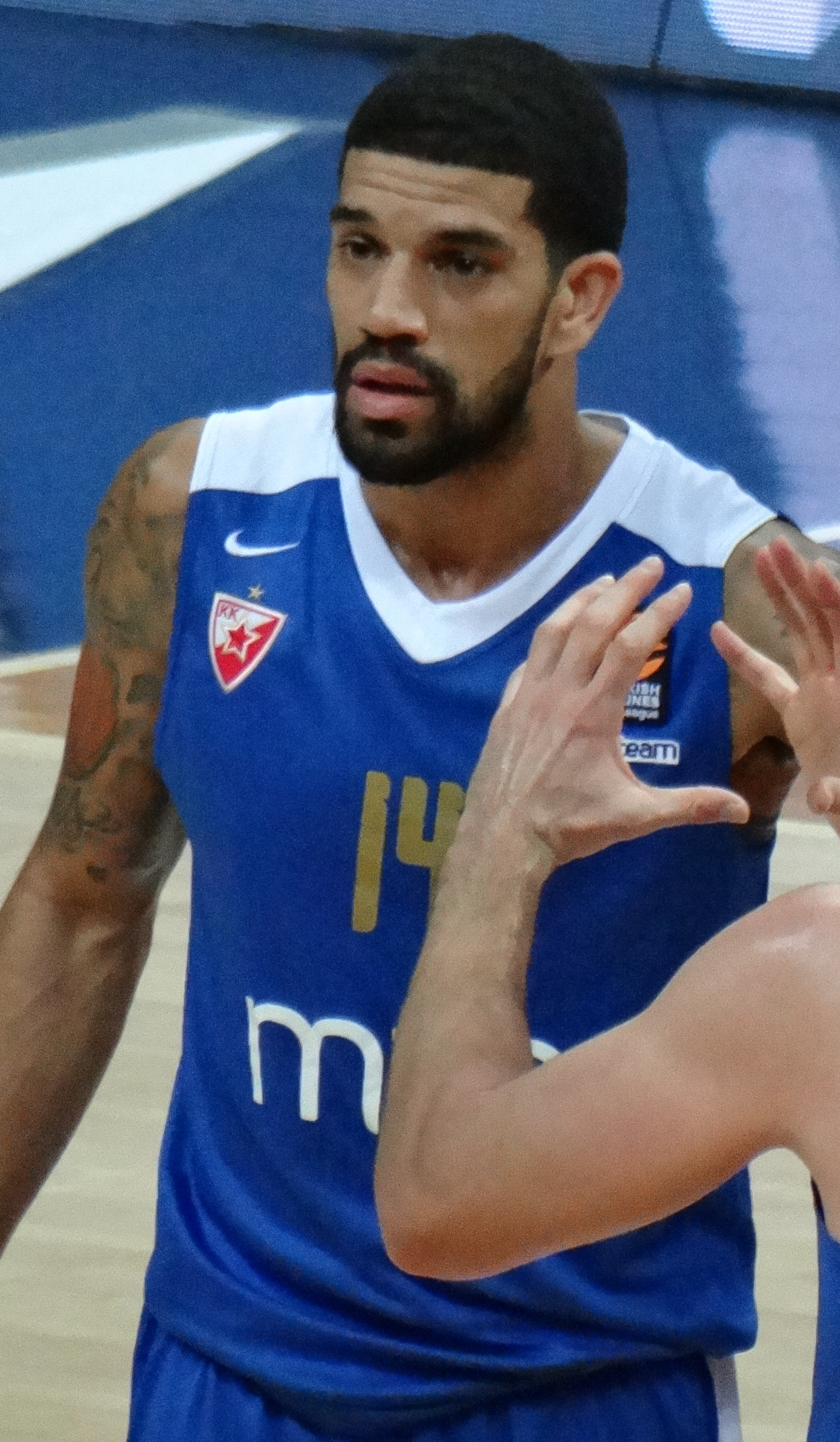
- Feldeine with Crvena zvezda in 2017

Personal information
- Born: June 26, 1988 (age 38) New York City, New York, U.S.
- Listed height: 1.93 m (6 ft 4 in)
- Listed weight: 91 kg (201 lb)

Career information
- High school: Cardinal Hayes (The Bronx, New York)
- College: Quinnipiac (2006–2010)
- NBA draft: 2010: undrafted
- Playing career: 2010–2026
- Position: Shooting guard

Career history
- 2010–2012: CB Breogán
- 2012–2014: Baloncesto Fuenlabrada
- 2014–2015: Pallacanestro Cantù
- 2015: Vaqueros de Bayamón
- 2015–2017: Panathinaikos
- 2017–2018: Crvena zvezda
- 2018–2020: Hapoel Jerusalem
- 2020–2021: Real Betis
- 2021: Kuwait SC
- 2021–2022: Fortitudo Bologna
- 2023: Hapoel Tel Aviv
- 2023–2024: Hapoel Galil Elyon
- 2024–2026: Club Nacional de Futbol

Career highlights
- 2× Israeli State Cup winner (2019, 2020); Israeli League Cup winner (2019); All-Israeli League First Team (2019); Israeli League All-Star (2019); All-Champions League Second Team (2019); Greek League champion (2017); 2× Greek Cup winner (2016, 2017); Greek Cup Finals MVP (2017); Serbian League champion (2018); First-team All-NEC (2010); Second-team All-NEC (2009); NEC Most Improved Player (2009)

James Feldeine (born June 26, 1988) is an American-Dominican former professional basketball player who played as a Shooting guard. He played college basketball for Quinnipiac University, before playing professionally in Spain, Italy, Puerto Rico, Greece, Serbia, Israel and Uruguay.

== High school career ==
Feldeine played basketball at Cardinal Hayes High School, before moving to Quinnipiac University. In his high school career, Feldeine was nominated to play in the McDonald's All-American Game, was twice named to the All-Bronx Burroughs First-Team, was named to the All-New York City Second-Team, and he was also named to the All-New York State Second-Team.

== College career ==
Feldeine played college basketball at Quinnipiac University, with the Quinnipiac Bobcats. In his junior college season, during the 2008–09 season, Feldeine was named the NEC's Most Improved Player, and was also selected to the All-NEC First-Team, after being the Northeast Conference's top scorer. During his junior year, he was also twice selected as the NEC Player of the Week, and he was also selected to the NABC's All-District 18 Second-Team.

During his senior college season, in 2009–10, Feldeine was selected to both the All-NEC First-Team, and the NABC All-District 18 First-Team.

== Professional career ==
=== Breogán (2010–2012) ===
Feldeine started his professional career in 2010 in Spain, with the Spanish club CB Breogán, where he played for two seasons, becoming one of the top scorers of the LEB Oro (Spanish 2nd Division).

=== Fuenlabrada (2012–2014) ===
In May 2012, Feldeine signed with the 1st-tier Spanish ACB League team Mad-Croc Fuenlabrada, on a contract through 2015. On January 19, 2013, Feldeine recorded a season-high 37 points, shooting 7-of-10 from 3-point range, along with four rebounds and five assists in a 72–69 win over Valencia. In 2012-13 he averaged 15.9 points per game (2nd in the league). The following season he averaged 13.9 points (7th in the league) and 1.8 steals (leading the league) per game .

=== Pallacanestro Cantù (2014–2015) ===
On 8 August 2014, he inked a one-year deal to play in Italy, with the Italian League club Pallacanestro Cantù.

=== Vaqueros de Bayamón (2015) ===
On May 31, 2015, he signed with the Puerto Rican club Vaqueros de Bayamón, for the rest of the 2015 BSN season. He averaged 24.6 points and 1.7 steals per game.

=== Panathinaikos (2015–2017) ===
On August 18, 2015, Feldeine signed a one-year deal to play in Greece with Panathinaikos of the Greek League and the EuroLeague. In February 2016, he extended his contract through 2018.

=== Crvena zvezda (2017–2018) ===
On August 2, 2017, Feldeine signed a two-year deal with the Serbian club Crvena zvezda. He played there only for the 2017–18 season.

=== Hapoel Jerusalem (2018–2020) ===
On August 11, 2018, Feldeine signed with the Israeli team Hapoel Jerusalem for the 2018–19 season. On November 7, 2018, Feldeine recorded a season-high 35 points, shooting 9-of-12 from 3-point range, along with five rebounds and four assists in an 88–64 win over ČEZ Nymburk. Two days later, he was named Champions League Gameday 5 MVP. On November 24, 2018, Feldeine recorded 28 points, including a three-pointer at the buzzer to give Jerusalem an 89–88 win over Hapoel Be'er Sheva. He was subsequently named Israeli League Round 8 MVP. On May 3, 2019, Feldeine was named Israeli League Player of the Month after averaging 23.8 points and 4.0 assists, shooting 57 percent from three-point range, along with 26.3 PIR per game in four games played in April. He was named Israeli 2018-19 BSL 1st Team

On January 14, 2019, Feldeine signed a two-year contract extension with Hapoel Jerusalem. On December 7, 2019, Feldeine recorded a career-high 41 points in 29 minutes, while shooting 14-of-20 from the field in a 88–73 win over Hapoel Gilboa Galil. Three days later, he was named Israeli League Round 9 MVP.

=== Coosur Real Betis (2020–2021) ===
On August 2, 2020, he signed with Real Betis of the Liga ACB.

=== Kuwait Sporting Club (2021) ===
On July 18, 2021, he signed with Kuwait Sporting Club. On 9 October, he scored 19 points in the final of the 2021 Arab Club Basketball Championship, which Kuwait lost to Al Ahly.

=== Fortitudo Bologna (2021–2023) ===
On November 29, 2021, he signed with Fortitudo Bologna of the Italian Lega Basket Serie A (LBA).

=== Hapoel Tel Aviv (2023) ===
On March 30, 2023, he signed with Hapoel Tel Aviv of the Israeli Basketball Premier League.

== National team career ==
Feldeine has also been a member of the senior men's Dominican Republic national basketball team. With the Dominican Republic's senior national team, he has played at the following international tournaments: the 2013 Marchand Continental Cup, the 2013 FIBA Americas Championship, the 2014 FIBA Basketball World Cup, and the 2015 FIBA Americas Championship.

== Personal life ==
He was born in New York City. His mother is of Dominican descent.

== Career statistics ==
Legend
GP	Games played	GS	Games started	MPG	Minutes per game
FG%	Field-goal percentage	3P%	3-point field-goal percentage	FT%	Free-throw percentage
RPG	Rebounds per game	APG	Assists per game	SPG	Steals per game
BPG	Blocks per game	PPG	Points per game	PIR	Performance index rating
**Bold**	Career high

=== EuroLeague ===
Year	Team	GP	GS	MPG	FG%	3P%	FT%	RPG	APG	SPG	BPG	PPG	PIR
2015–16	Panathinaikos	26	19	**26.1**	.368	.314	.756	**2.2**	2.1	.9	**.2**	8.4	6.4
2016–17	Panathinaikos	**33**	**29**	19.9	**.406**	**.378**	.609	1.1	2.0	.9	**.2**	6.7	5.5
2017–18	Crvena zvezda	28	17	25.0	.374	.345	**.865**	1.6	**2.9**	**1.2**	.1	**11.6**	**9.7**
Career		87	65	23.4	.367	.345	.790	1.6	2.3	1.0	.2	8.8	7.1

== See also ==
- List of foreign basketball players in Serbia
