= Devyn Marble =

American basketball player (born 1992)

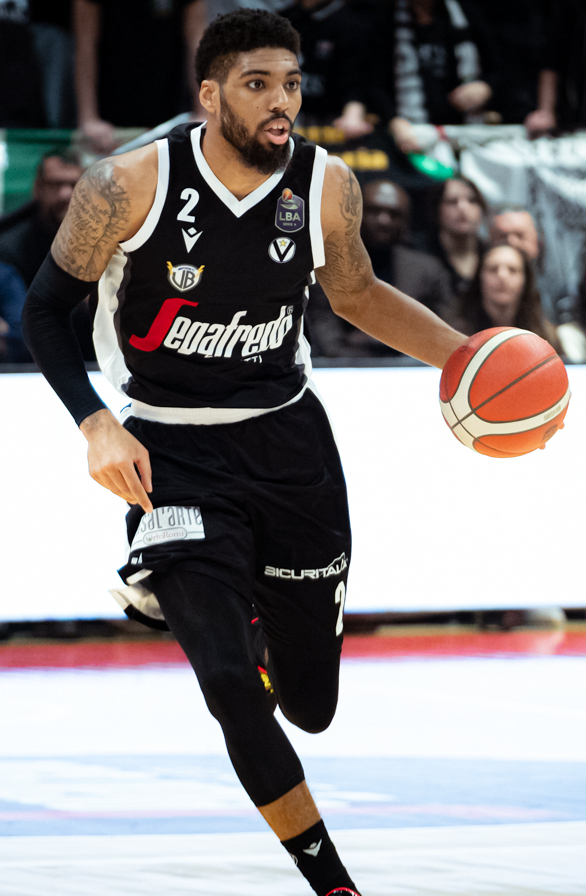
- Marble in February 2020

Free agent
- Position: Shooting guard / small forward

Personal information
- Born: September 21, 1992 (age 33) Flint, Michigan, U.S.
- Listed height: 1.98 m (6 ft 6 in)
- Listed weight: 90 kg (198 lb)

Career information
- High school: Southfield-Lathrup (Southfield, Michigan)
- College: Iowa (2010–2014)
- NBA draft: 2014: 2nd round, 56th overall pick
- Drafted by: Denver Nuggets
- Playing career: 2014–present

Career history
- 2014–2016: Orlando Magic
- 2014–2016: →Erie BayHawks
- 2016: Aris Thessaloniki
- 2017–2019: Aquila Basket Trento
- 2019–2020: Santa Cruz Warriors
- 2019–2020: Virtus Bologna
- 2020–2021: BC Astana
- 2021: Maccabi Haifa
- 2021–2022: MKS Dąbrowa Górnicza
- 2022: Enea Zastal Zielona Góra
- 2022–2023: Legia Warsaw
- 2023: Hapoel Galil Elyon
- 2023–2024: Formosa Dreamers
- 2024–2025: FC Porto

Career highlights
- Portuguese Supercup winner (2024); Portuguese Cup winner (2025); First-team All-Big Ten (2014); Third-team All-Big Ten (2013)
- Stats at NBA.com
- Stats at Basketball Reference

Roy Devyn Marble (born September 21, 1992) is an American professional basketball player for FC Porto of the Liga Portuguesa de Basquetebol (LPB). He played college basketball for the Iowa Hawkeyes, and was drafted by the Denver Nuggets in the second round of the 2014 NBA draft.

== High school career ==
Marble attended Southfield-Lathrup High School in Southfield, Michigan. As a junior, he averaged 22 points, nine rebounds, four assists and two steals. As a senior, he averaged 24.5 points, eight rebounds, four assists and 2.5 steals per game.

Considered a three-star recruit by ESPN.com, Marble was listed as the No. 64 shooting guard in the nation in 2010.

=== Honors ===
- 2010 OAA first team
- 2010 Oakland County Dream Team
- 2010 Michigan All-Star
- 2009 Oakland Red first team
- 2009 All-State first team

== College career ==
A two-time team captain of the Iowa Hawkeyes, Marble finished his college career as one of only two Big Ten players since 1985–86 to amass 1,675+ points, 375+ assists, 450+ rebounds and 175+ steals. He also finished his career ranked fifth in Iowa career scoring (1,694) and free throws made (432), sixth in assists (397) and free throws attempted (595), and seventh in steals (176), while his 136 games played tied Melsahn Basabe for second all-time at Iowa.

== Professional career ==
=== Orlando Magic (2014–2016) ===
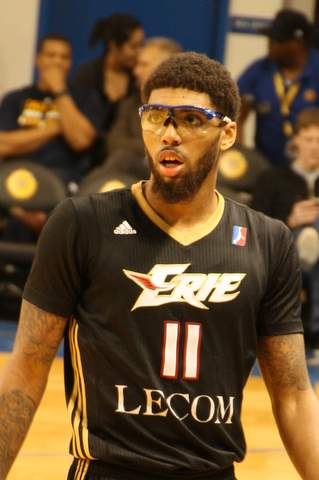
Marble with the Erie BayHawks in 2016

On June 26, 2014, Marble was selected with the 56th overall pick in the 2014 NBA draft by the Denver Nuggets. He was later traded to the Orlando Magic on draft night. He later joined the Magic for the 2014 NBA Summer League before signing his rookie scale contract with the team on July 24. During his rookie season, he was assigned multiple times to the Erie BayHawks of the NBA Development League.

On November 30, 2015, Marble was reassigned to the Erie BayHawks. He was recalled on December 23, reassigned on January 1, 2016, and recalled again on January 18.

On July 15, 2016, Marble was traded, along with a 2020 second-round draft pick, to the Los Angeles Clippers in exchange for C. J. Wilcox and cash considerations. He was subsequently waived by the Clippers upon being acquired by the team.

=== Europe (2016–present) ===
On August 10, 2016, Marble signed with Greek club Aris for the 2016–17 season. He had a contract dispute with the team on December 22, and was subsequently released and returned overseas.

On January 17, 2017, Marble signed with Italian club Aquila Basket Trento for the rest of the 2016–17 Serie A season. On April 7, he parted ways with Trento. In 10 games he averaged 10.4 points, 3.2 rebounds, and 2.1 assists per game. Marble suffered a season-ending knee injury and returned to the US to have surgery.

On July 31, 2018, Marble came back to Trento and signed a two-year deal with Aquila Basket.

After a short experience back in the American NBA G League with the Santa Cruz Warriors, where he played the first half of the 2019–20 season, Virtus Bologna brought him back to Italy when he signed a contract on January 22 until the end of the 2019-20 season. Marble averaged 6.5 points per game in seven games. On October 16, 2020, he signed with Astana in Kazakhstan.

On March 25, 2021, Marble signed with Maccabi Haifa of the Israeli Basketball Premier League.

On October 23, 2021, Marble signed with MKS Dąbrowa Górnicza of the Polish Basketball League.

On March 7, 2022, Marble signed with Enea Zastal Zielona Góra of the Polish Basketball League.

On July 19, 2022, Marble signed with Legia Warszawa of the Polish Basketball League.

== NBA career statistics ==
Legend
GP	Games played	GS	Games started	MPG	Minutes per game
FG%	Field goal percentage	3P%	3-point field goal percentage	FT%	Free throw percentage
RPG	Rebounds per game	APG	Assists per game	SPG	Steals per game
BPG	Blocks per game	PPG	Points per game	**Bold**	Career high

=== Regular season ===
Year	Team	GP	GS	MPG	FG%	3P%	FT%	RPG	APG	SPG	BPG	PPG
2014–15	Orlando	16	**7**	**13.0**	**.318**	.182	.313	**1.9**	**1.1**	**.6**	**.1**	**2.3**
2015–16	Orlando	**28**	0	8.9	.296	**.250**	**.417**	1.4	.4	.5	.0	2.1
Career		44	7	10.4	.304	.222	.375	1.6	.7	.5	.1	2.2

== Personal life ==
On March 9, 2013, he and his father, Roy Marble, became the first father-son duo to record 1,000 points each in Big Ten Conference history.
