= Eric Buckner =

American basketball player (born 1990)

Free Agent
- Position: Center

Personal information
- Born: April 26, 1990 (age 36) Ehrhardt, South Carolina, U.S.
- Listed height: 6 ft 10 in (2.08 m)
- Listed weight: 220 lb (100 kg)

Career information
- High school: Bamberg-Ehrhardt (Bamberg, South Carolina)
- College: Gulf Coast State (2008–2010); Georgia State (2010–2012)
- NBA draft: 2012: undrafted
- Playing career: 2012–present

Career history
- 2012–2013: Uşak Sportif
- 2013–2014: İstanbul BB
- 2014–2015: Uşak Sportif
- 2015–2016: Türk Telekom
- 2016: Henan Roaring Elephants
- 2016–2017: Aris
- 2017: Büyükçekmece
- 2017–2018: İstanbul BB
- 2018: ASVEL
- 2018–2020: Monaco
- 2020–2021: Élan Chalon
- 2021: Astana
- 2021: Afyon Belediye
- 2021–2022: Ulsan Hyundai Mobis Phoebus
- 2022: Zenit Saint Petersburg
- 2022: Sigortam.net İTÜ BB
- 2022–2023: BC Wolves
- 2023–2024: OGM Ormanspor
- 2024: Henan Golden Elephants
- 2024–2025: Bandırma Bordo
- 2025: Flamengo
- 2026: Final Gençlik

Career highlights
- VTB United League champion (2022); Third-team All-CAA (2012)

Eric Rashard Buckner (born April 26, 1990) is an American professional basketball player. Buckner finished his NCAA basketball career playing for Georgia State.

== Collegiate career ==
Buckner played two seasons for junior college, Gulf Coast State College, before transferring to finish his career at Georgia State University. He was named the 2012 Atlanta Tip-off Club Georgia Men's College Player of the Year.

=== College statistics ===
Season Averages
Season	Team	GP	MPG	PTS	REB	BLK	FG%	FT%	TO
2008–09*	Gulf Coast Commodores	30	–	–	–	–	.544	–	–
2009–10*	Gulf Coast Commodores	24	–	–	5.5	–	–	–	–
2010–11	Georgia State Panthers	31	24.3	9.4	5.6	1.58	.548	.583	1.7
2011–12	Georgia State Panthers	34	30.7	10.8	7.1	3.47	.620	.507	1.3
Career		119	27.5	10.1	6.1	2.57	.571	.545	1.5

(*)Full statistical records from these seasons have not yet been found

=== College records ===
- All-time Georgia State University leader in blocked shots (in just two seasons): 167
- Single-season Georgia State University leader in blocked shots: 118, 2011–12
- Single-game Gulf Coast State College leader in field goal percentage: .1000 (7–7), 2008–09

== Professional career ==
Buckner's professional career began with Uşak Sportif at Turkey in 2012. Until 2015, he spend 3 seasons for Uşak Sportif and İstanbul BB in Turkey as well.

In 2015, Buckner joined the Celtics summer league roster alongside another former GSU Panther, R. J. Hunter. On January 14, 2017, Buckner signed with the Turkish team Demir İnşaat Büyükçekmece.

On December 9, 2018, he has signed with As Monaco of the LNB Pro A.

On August 13, 2020, he has signed with Élan Chalon of the LNB Pro A.

On August 14, 2021, Buckner signed with Afyon Belediye of the Turkish Basketbol Süper Ligi.

On April 26, 2022, Buckner signed with BC Zenit Saint Petersburg of the VTB United League.

On July 23, 2022, he has signed with Sigortam.net İTÜ BB of the TBL.

On December 30, 2022, Bucker signed with BC Wolves of the Lithuanian Basketball League (LKL). He parted ways with the team on July 10, 2023.

On September 14, 2024, Bucker signed with the Bandırma Bordo of the Türkiye Basketbol Ligi.

=== The Basketball Tournament ===
In 2017, Buckner played for the Kentucky Kings of The Basketball Tournament. Buckner averaged 12.5 PPG and 7.0 RPG to help his team advance to the second round of the tournament. The Basketball Tournament is a $2 million winner-take-all annual tournament broadcast on ESPN.

== Personal life ==
Eric Buckner is the son of April Aikens and Sylvester Buckner. He majored in sociology at Georgia State University.
