= Žanis Peiners =

Latvian basketball player

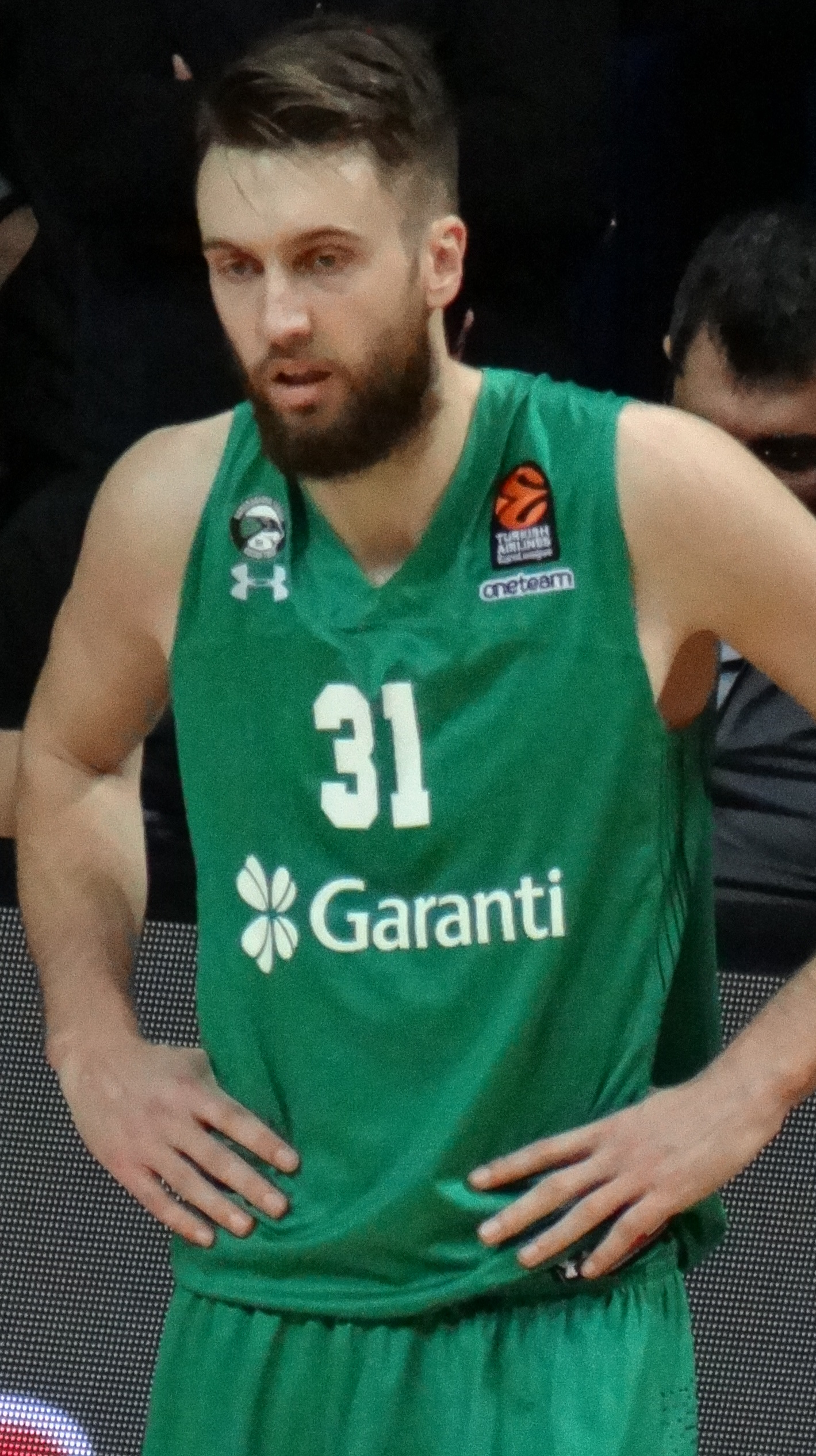

Personal information
- Born: 2 August 1990 (age 36) Rēzekne, Latvia
- Listed height: 2.05 m (6 ft 9 in)
- Listed weight: 96 kg (212 lb)

Career information
- Playing career: 2009–2020
- Position: Small forward / shooting guard
- Number: 31
- Coaching career: 2024–present

Career history

Playing
- 2009–2010: VEF Rīga
- 2010–2013: Latvijas Universitāte
- 2013–2014: MBC Mykolaiv
- 2014–2016: Ventspils
- 2016–2017: PAOK
- 2017–2018: BC Lietkabelis
- 2018–2019: Darüşşafaka
- 2019–2020: Partizan

Coaching
- 2024–2025: Latvia (assistant)
- 2025–: Latvijas Universitāte (sports director)

Career highlights
- 3× LBL All-Star (2011–2013); LBL Scoring Champion (2013)

Žanis Peiners (born 1 August 1990) is a Latvian professional basketball player. He is 2.05 m (6 ft 8 3/4 in) tall shooting guard-small forward.

== Professional career ==
In 2009, he started pro career with VEF Rīga. After that season, he went to Latvijas Universitāte, where he played the next three seasons. Peiners helped his team, which consisted of semi-professional student-athletes, to reach the LBL playoffs twice. He was scoring the champion of the LBL in 2013, averaging 21.1 points per game.

In 2013, Žanis graduated from LU, and attracted the attention of multiple clubs from abroad. He had strong interest from KK Union Olimpija, but ultimately decided to sign with MBC Mykolaiv. He finished the season in the Ukrainian SuperLeague, as the league's second best scorer (16.1 points per game).

On 17 September 2014 he joined the defending Latvian League champions, Ventspils. On 20 July 2016 Peiners signed with the Greek club PAOK Thessaloniki.

In June 2018, Peiners signed with Darüşşafaka of the Basketbol Süper Ligi (BSL) and EuroLeague.

In July 2019, Peiners signed with Partizan of the ABA League and EuroCup.

== Latvian national team ==
Peiners has also been a member of the senior men's Latvian national basketball team. With Latvia's senior national team, he played at the EuroBasket 2015 and EuroBasket 2017.

== Career statistics ==
Legend
GP	Games played	GS	Games started	MPG	Minutes per game
FG%	Field-goal percentage	3P%	3-point field-goal percentage	FT%	Free-throw percentage
RPG	Rebounds per game	APG	Assists per game	SPG	Steals per game
BPG	Blocks per game	PPG	Points per game	PIR	Performance index rating
**Bold**	Career high

=== EuroLeague ===
Year	Team	GP	GS	MPG	FG%	3P%	FT%	RPG	APG	SPG	BPG	PPG	PIR
2018–19	Darüşşafaka	28	14	17.3	.539	.300	.864	1.9	1.5	.4	.2	6.7	7.9
Career		28	14	17.3	.539	.300	.864	1.9	1.5	.4	.2	6.7	7.9
