= Michael Jenkins (basketball) =

American basketball player (born 1986)

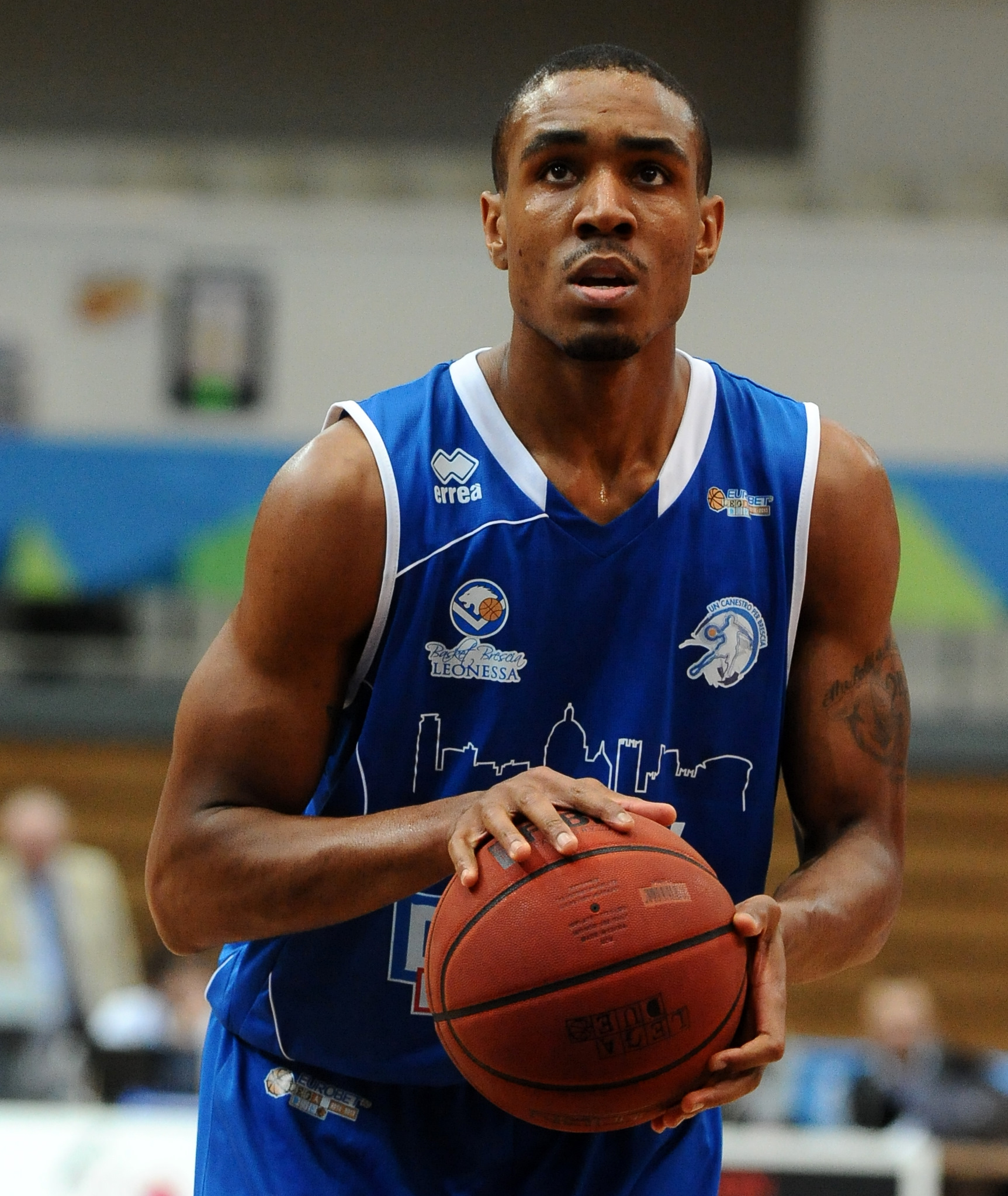
- Jenkins with Brescia Leonessa in 2013

Personal information
- Born: September 6, 1986 (age 40) Kinston, North Carolina, U.S.
- Listed height: 6 ft 3 in (1.91 m)
- Listed weight: 195 lb (88 kg)

Career information
- High school: Kinston (Kinston, North Carolina)
- College: Winthrop (2004–2008)
- NBA draft: 2008: undrafted
- Playing career: 2008–2020
- Position: Shooting guard / point guard

Career history
- 2008: Albany Patroons
- 2009: Budućnost Podgorica
- 2009–2010: Tigers Tübingen
- 2010–2011: Liège
- 2011–2012: Optima Gent
- 2012–2013: Brescia Leonessa
- 2013–2014: Cantù
- 2014: Oklahoma City Blue
- 2015: İstanbul BB
- 2015–2016: Türk Telekom
- 2016–2017: Aris Thessaloniki
- 2017: Pistoia
- 2017–2018: Reyer Venezia
- 2018–2019: BC Astana
- 2019–2020: Nizhny Novgorod

Career highlights
- FIBA Europe Cup champion (2018); TBL Three-Point Shootout champion (2015); Montenegrin Cup champion (2009); Second-team All-Big South (2008); First-team All-Big South (2007)
- Stats at Basketball Reference

Michael Jerome Jenkins (born September 6, 1986) is an American former professional basketball player. He played college basketball for Winthrop University.

== College career ==
In his four-year career at Winthrop, Jenkins played 131 games (70 starts) while averaging 9.6 points, 2.8 rebounds and 1.9 assists in 22.6 minutes per game. As a senior, he led the Eagles to their fourth straight conference title and was named the 2008 Big South tournament Most Valuable Player after scoring 33 points to return the Eagles to the NCAA Tournament. The 6'3" combo guard averaged 13.9 points per game in 2007–08 while leading the Eagles to a 23–10 record. He was also a two-time member of the Big South Conference All-Tournament team and led the Eagles in three-point percentage in 2006–07.

== Professional career ==
=== 2008–09 season ===
After going undrafted in the 2008 NBA draft, Jenkins was selected with the first overall pick in 2008 CBA draft by the Albany Patroons on September 23, 2008. However, he left the Patroons after appearing in just three games. On February 12, 2009, he signed with Budućnost Podgorica of the Montenegrin Basketball League where he spent the rest of the season and helped the team win the 2009 Montenegrin Cup.

=== 2009–10 season ===
On June 25, 2009, Jenkins signed with Tigers Tübingen for the 2009–10 Basketball Bundesliga season.

=== 2010–11 season ===
On July 22, 2010, Jenkins signed with Liège Basket for the 2010–11 Ethias League season. In January 2011, he left Liège after appearing in 13 league games, six EuroChallenge games and two Eurocup games.

=== 2011–12 season ===
On September 2, 2011, Jenkins signed with Optima Gent for the 2011–12 Ethias League season.

=== 2012–13 season ===
On September 8, 2012, Jenkins signed with Basket Brescia Leonessa for the 2012–13 Legadue Basket season.

=== 2013–14 season ===
On July 12, 2013, Jenkins signed with Pallacanestro Cantù for the 2013–14 Lega Basket Serie A season.

=== 2014–15 season ===
In July 2014, Jenkins joined the Brooklyn Nets for the 2014 NBA Summer League where he averaged 6.8 points, 1.8 rebounds and 1.2 steals in five games. On September 29, 2014, he signed with the Oklahoma City Thunder. However, he was later waived by the Thunder on October 24, 2014, after appearing in all seven of the team's preseason games while averaging 6.0 points, 1.7 rebounds and 1.7 assists in 17.5 minutes per game. On November 4, 2014, he was acquired by the Oklahoma City Blue of the NBA Development League as an affiliate player and went on to play 14 games before terminating his contract with the team on December 31, 2014, in order to sign in Turkey.

On January 2, 2015, Jenkins signed with İstanbul Büyükşehir Belediyespor for the rest of the 2014–15 Turkish Basketball League season. Later that month, he was part of the TBL All-Star Weekend at Ankara Arena, where he came away as the champion of the three-point contest.

=== 2015–16 season ===
On June 4, 2015, Jenkins signed with Türk Telekom of Turkey for the 2015–16 season.

=== 2016–17 season ===
On July 29, 2016, Jenkins signed a two-year deal with Aris Thessaloniki of Greece. On March 13, 2017, he parted ways with Aris after averaging 10 points per game in Basketball Champions League and 11 points per game in Greek League. Seven days later, he signed with Italian club Pistoia Basket 2000 for the rest of the 2016–17 LBA season.

=== 2017–18 season ===
On September 20, 2017, Jenkins signed with Umana Reyer Venezia for the 2017–18 LBA season. On May 2, Jenkins won the European fourth-tier FIBA Europe Cup with Reyer.

=== 2018–19 season ===
Jenkins spent the 2018–19 season with BC Astana of the Kazakhstan Championship and VTB United League.

=== 2019–20 season ===
On December 11, 2019, Jenkins signed with Nizhny Novgorod of the VTB United League. He averaged 11.5 points and 2.6 assists per game. Jenkins parted ways with the team on July 16, 2020.

== See also ==
- List of NCAA Division I men's basketball players with 12 or more 3-point field goals in a game
