= Will Cummings =

American basketball player (born 1992)

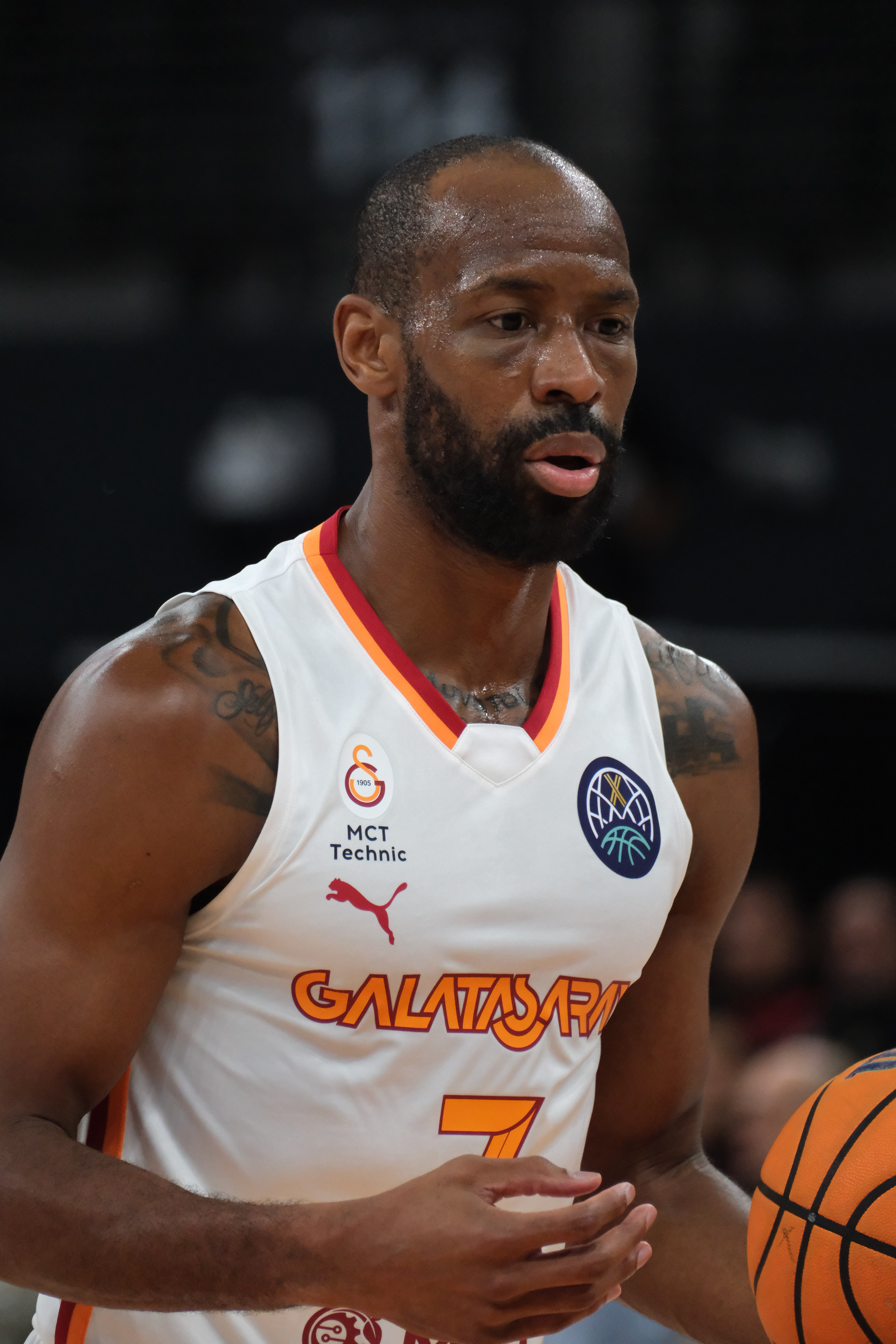
- Cummings with Galatasaray in 2025

No. 12 – Bursaspor
- Position: Point guard
- League: Basketbol Süper Ligi

Personal information
- Born: October 7, 1992 (age 34) Jacksonville, Florida, U.S.
- Listed height: 6 ft 2 in (1.88 m)
- Listed weight: 185 lb (84 kg)

Career information
- High school: Providence School (Jacksonville, Florida)
- College: Temple (2011–2015)
- NBA draft: 2015: undrafted
- Playing career: 2015–present

Career history
- 2015–2016: Rio Grande Valley Vipers
- 2016: Dolomiti Energia Trento
- 2016–2017: Aris Thessaloniki
- 2017–2018: Darüşşafaka
- 2018–2019: Oldenburg
- 2019–2021: Lokomotiv Kuban
- 2021–2022: Metropolitans 92
- 2022–2023: Zhejiang Lions
- 2023: South East Melbourne Phoenix
- 2023–2024: Hapoel Tel Aviv
- 2024–2026: Galatasaray
- 2026–present: Bursaspor

Career highlights
- EuroCup champion (2018); All-EuroCup First Team (2022); All-FIBA Champions League Second Team (2025); LNB Pro A MVP (2022); All-LNB Pro A First Team (2022); Bundesliga MVP (2019); All-Bundesliga First Team (2019); Bundesliga Top Scorer (2019); German All-Star (2019); Greek League Top Scorer (2017); Greek Cup Finals Top Scorer (2017); All-NBA D-League Second Team (2016); NBA D-League All-Rookie Team (2016); NBA D-League All-Star (2016); First-team All-AAC (2015)
- Stats at Basketball Reference

William Frederick Cummings (born October 7, 1992) is an American professional basketball player for Bursaspor of the Turkish Basketbol Süper Ligi (BSL). He played college basketball for Temple.

== High school career ==
Cummings, a point guard from Jacksonville, Florida, committed to play for Temple on September 4, 2010. He averaged 18.1 points, 8.1 assists, 4.0 steals per game as a senior at Providence School, in addition to carrying a 4.0 grade point average. The Jacksonville Times-Union named him the high school boys basketball player of the year. Cummings drew attention from Stanford, Miami (Fl.), and Boston College, but chose Temple because of their winning tradition.

College recruiting
Name	Hometown	School	Height	Weight	Commit date
Will Cummings; PG	Jacksonville, Florida	Providence School (FL)	6 ft 1 in (1.85 m)	165 lb (75 kg)	Sep 4, 2010
Will Cummings; PG	Recruit ratings: Scout: Rivals: (91)				

== College career ==
As a freshman, Cummings averaged 1.4 points and 0.8 rebounds in 6.3 minutes per game. He started versus George Washington and posted 2 points and an assist.

Cummings played in 34 games as a sophomore, starting 32, and averaged 5.8 points, 1.9 assists, and 1.4 steals per game. He posted double-figures scoring in six games, including a season-high 15 points in a victory over Rhode Island.

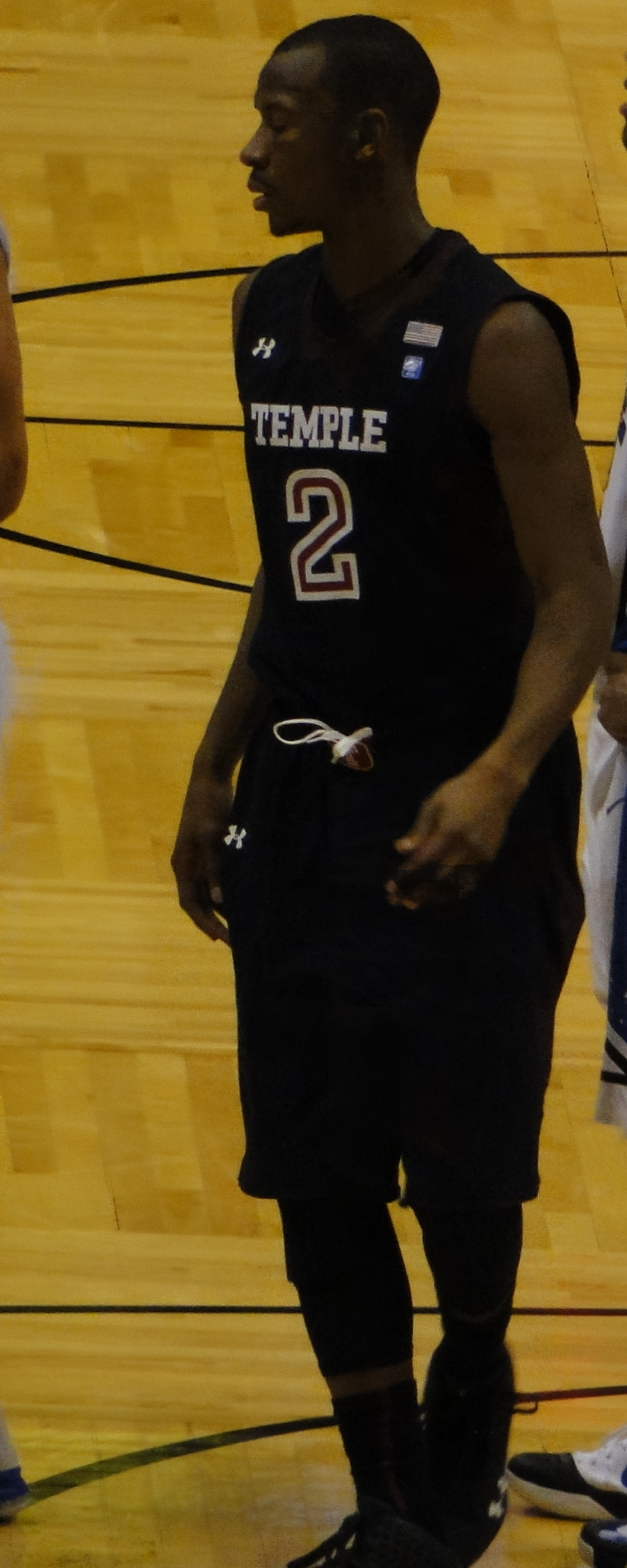
Cummings with the Temple Owls in 2011

In his junior season, Cummings was a Second Team Philadelphia Big 5 selection. He averaged 16.8 points, a team-leading 4.6 assists and 1.5 steals in 34.4 minutes per game. He scored 31 points in a game against UCF.

As a senior, Cummings was named to the First Team All-American Athletic Conference. He missed a game against Cincinnati after suffering a strained muscle in his leg on January 10, 2015. He led the team in scoring (14.8 points per game), assists (4.2 per game) and steals (1.9 per game). With 189 free throws made, he finished tied for second in school history in made free throws in a season. Additionally, Cummings completed his collegiate career 35th on Temple's all-time scoring list, and led the team to a 17-win improvement from the previous year, the highest in the nation. Temple reached the NIT semifinals.

== Professional career ==
=== 2015–16 season ===
After going undrafted in the 2015 NBA draft, Cummings joined the Houston Rockets for the 2015 NBA Summer League. On September 3, 2015, he signed with the Rockets, only to be waived by the team on October 23 after appearing in six preseason games. On November 2, he was acquired by the Rio Grande Valley Vipers of the NBA Development League as an affiliate player of the Rockets. On November 13, he made his professional debut in a 110–106 win over the Idaho Stampede, recording 11 points and 5 assists in 32 minutes. On January 29, 2016, he was named in the West All-Star team for the 2016 NBA D-League All-Star Game. At the season's end, he was named to the All-NBA D-League Second Team and All-Rookie Team.

On April 29, 2016, Cummings left Rio Grande Valley and signed with Dolomiti Energia Trento of the Italian LBA for the rest of the season. On May 4, he made his debut with Dolomiti Energia in a 73–70 loss to Juvecaserta Basket, recording 12 points, three rebounds and two steals in 18 minutes of the bench.

=== 2016–17 season ===
In July 2016, Cummings joined the San Antonio Spurs for the 2016 NBA Summer League, and on July 24, 2016, Cummings signed with Greek Basket League club Aris Thessaloniki. In the semifinals of the 2017 Greek Cup, Cummings scored the game-winning lay-up against AEK Athens, to give Aris the ticket to the Cup Final against Panathinaikos Athens.

=== 2017–18 season ===
On July 17, 2017, Cummings signed a 1+1 year deal with the Turkish club Darüşşafaka. Cummings helped Darüşşafaka to win the 2018 EuroCup title.

=== 2018–19 season ===
On July 6, 2018, Cummings signed with the German team EWE Baskets Oldenburg for the 2018–19 season. He got honored with the MVP title and lead his team to the 2nd place in the regular season.

=== 2019–20 season ===
On July 7, 2019, Cummings signed a two-year contract with Lokomotiv Kuban of the Russian VTB United League.

=== 2020–21 season ===
Cummings averaged 12.8 points, 2.0 rebounds, 3.5 assists and 1.2 steals per game for Lokomotiv Kuban during the 2020–21 season.

=== 2021–22 season ===
On July 23, 2021, Cummings signed with Metropolitans 92 of the LNB Pro A.

=== 2022–23 season ===
On August 17, 2022, Cummings signed with Zhejiang Lions of the Chinese Basketball Association (CBA).

=== 2023–24 season ===
On August 11, 2023, Cummings signed with the South East Melbourne Phoenix in Australia for the 2023–24 NBL season. On December 8, 2023, he was released by the Phoenix, reportedly due to failing to meet off-court requirements on multiple occasions. In 12 games, he averaged 14.5 points, 3.3 rebounds, and 2.7 assists per game.

=== 2024–25 season ===
On July 5, 2024, he signed with Galatasaray of the Basketbol Süper Ligi (BSL).

=== 2025–26 season ===
He signed a new 1-year contract with Galatasaray on July 2, 2025. On March 15, 2026, Cummings was diagnosed with sarcoidosis.

=== 2026–27 season ===
On November 16, 2026, he signed with Bursaspor Basketbol of the Basketbol Süper Ligi (BSL).

== Career statistics ==
Legend
GP	Games played	GS	Games started	MPG	Minutes per game
FG%	Field goal percentage	3P%	3-point field goal percentage	FT%	Free throw percentage
RPG	Rebounds per game	APG	Assists per game	SPG	Steals per game
BPG	Blocks per game	PPG	Points per game	**Bold**	Career high

=== Eurocup ===
Year	Team	GP	GS	MPG	FG%	3P%	FT%	RPG	APG	SPG	BPG	PPG	PIR
2017–18	Darüşşafaka	22	3	18.0	.540	.178	.837	1.8	2.1	.7	.7	9	6.6
2019–20	Lokomotiv	10	7	26.4	.525	.250	.806	1.9	3.2	1.5	1.2	12.7	10.6
2020–21	Lokomotiv	19	3	22.2	.491	.372	.805	1.8	2.5	0.9	0.6	12.0	12.9
