= Justin Jackson (basketball, born 1990) =

American basketball player (born 1990)

No. 15 – Club Atlético Goes
- Position: Center / Power forward
- League: Liga Uruguaya de Básquetbol

Personal information
- Born: October 13, 1990 (age 36) Cocoa Beach, Florida, U.S.
- Listed height: 6 ft 9 in (2.06 m)
- Listed weight: 230 lb (104 kg)

Career information
- High school: Eau Gallie (Melbourne, Florida); Montverde Academy (Montverde, Florida); Arlington Country Day School (Jacksonville, Florida)
- College: Cincinnati (2010–2014)
- NBA draft: 2014: undrafted
- Playing career: 2014–present

Career history
- 2014–2015: Texas Legends
- 2015: Bisons Loimaa
- 2016–2017: Czarni Słupsk
- 2017: Aris Thessaloniki
- 2017: Maccabi Kiryat Motzkin
- 2018: Rieker Komárno
- 2018: Magnolia Hotshots
- 2018–2019: APOEL
- 2019–2021: Atomerőmű SE
- 2021–2022: Urunday Universitario
- 2022: CS Dinamo București
- 2022–2023: Riachuelo de la Rioja
- 2023: Titanes del Licey
- 2023: Sportiva Italiana Valparaiso
- 2023: Deportivo San José
- 2023: Jaguares UAM
- 2023–present: Club Atlético Goes

Career highlights
- Cypriot League blocks leader (2019); AAC Defensive Player of the Year (2014); Second-team All-AAC (2014)

Justin LeShayne Jackson (born October 13, 1990) is an American professional basketball player for Club Atlético Goes of the Liga Uruguaya de Básquetbol. He played college basketball for the Cincinnati Bearcats.

== High school career ==
Jackson began his high school career at Eau Gallie High School, in Melbourne, Florida. Under Coach Brandon Palmer, Jackson starred on the varsity team, as a freshman and sophomore, leading the Commodores to a district championship in his sophomore year, over Vero Beach High School and its legendary coach, Chuck Loewendick.

As a high school junior, in the 2008–09 season, Jackson attended Montverde Academy, in Montverde, Florida, where averaged 15.0 points, 12.3 rebounds, and 3.1 blocks per game, for coach Kevin Sutton. He was named to the Florida Association of Basketball Coaches (FABC) and Florida Sports Writer's Association (FSWA) State All-Independent teams.

In November 2009, Jackson signed a National Letter of Intent to play college basketball for the University of Cincinnati.

As a high school senior, in the 2009–10 season, Jackson attended Arlington Country Day School, in Jacksonville, Florida, where he helped the Apaches to the FHSAA Class 2A finals, and a record of 21–6.

== College career ==
In his freshman season at Cincinnati, Jackson played in 35 games off the bench, while averaging 2.5 points and 2.5 rebounds, in 12.9 minutes per game, while shooting 52.7 percent from the field (39 of 74).

In his sophomore season, Jackson played in 37 games, with 20 starts, averaging 5.1 points and 4.2 rebounds, in 21.1 minutes per game. He led Cincinnati with 61 blocks, and ranked fifth in the Big East, averaging 1.7 blocks per game.

In his junior season, Jackson played in 30 games with, 22 starts, averaging 3.8 points and 5.1 rebounds, in 18.8 minutes per game. He also ranked eighth in the Big East, averaging 1.4 blocks.

In his senior season, Jackson was named the AAC Defensive Player of the Year, while also earning second-team All-AAC and District 25 second-team All-American honors. In 34 games (all starts), he averaged 11.1 points, 7.3 rebounds, and 2.9 blocks, in 27.8 minutes per game. He finished his career with 219 total blocks, ranking the fourth most in school history.

== Professional career ==
After going undrafted in the 2014 NBA draft, Jackson joined the Charlotte Hornets for the 2014 NBA Summer League. On August 4, 2014, he agreed to terms with Nea Kifissia of Greek Basket League. However, he was released by the club a month later, before appearing in an official game for them.

On November 1, 2014, Jackson was selected by the Rio Grande Valley Vipers, with the 18th overall pick, in the 2014 NBA Development League draft. He was later traded to the Texas Legends on draft night.

On August 17, 2015, Jackson signed with Bisons Loimaa of the Finnish Korisliiga. On January 7, 2016, he signed with Czarni Słupsk of the Polish Basketball League. On July 25, 2016, he re-signed with Czarni Slupsk. On January 9, 2017, he parted ways with the club. On January 20, 2017, he signed with Greek club Aris Thessaloniki.

On October 8, 2019, he has signed with Atomerőmű SE of the NB I/A. Jackson averaged 7.8 points, 6.4 rebounds, 1.4 steals and 1.3 blocks per game. On August 4, 2020, he re-signed with the team. In 2021, Jackson joined Urunday Universitario of the Uruguayan league, and averaged 13.3 points, 6.3 rebounds, and 1.9 assists per game. On January 21, 2022, Jackson signed with CS Dinamo București of the Romanian Liga Națională.

== Personal ==
Jackson is the son of Shauna and Larry Jackson, and he has two brothers, LaTray Green and Corbin Jackson, and a sister, Shaulya Murray. Jackson's youngest brother, Corbin, played Division II college basketball at the Florida Institute of Technology, under coach Billy Mims.
