= Theodoros Zaras =

Greek former basketball player (born 1987)

Thodoris Zaras Θόδωρος Ζάρας
Personal information
- Born: August 12, 1987 (age 39) Thessaloniki, Greece
- Listed height: 6 ft 5.75 in (1.97 m)
- Listed weight: 216 lb (98 kg)

Career information
- NBA draft: 2009: undrafted
- Playing career: 2005–2026
- Position: Shooting guard / small forward

Career history
- 2005–2008: ICBS
- 2008–2009: AEL
- 2009–2010: Kolossos Rodou
- 2010–2011: Kavala
- 2011–2015: KAOD
- 2015–2017: Aris Thessaloniki
- 2017–2019: PAOK Thessaloniki
- 2019–2020: Iraklis Thessaloniki
- 2020–2021: Kolossos Rodou
- 2021–2022: Larisa
- 2022–2025: Lavrio
- 2025–2026: PAOK Thessaloniki

Theodoros "Thodoris" Zaras (Greek: Θεόδωρος "Θοδωρής" Ζάρας; born August 12, 1987) is a Greek former professional basketball player who currently serves as the head of the development program of PAOK Thessaloniki. During his playing career, he was a 6 ft 5 3/4 in (1.97 m) tall swingman.

During his professional career, Zaras played in the top-tier domestic league, the Greek Basket League, as well as in both European-wide secondary competitions, the EuroCup and the Basketball Champions League.

== Youth career ==
Zaras played youth club basketball with AO Stavroupolis, a team in western Thessaloniki, before he started his professional career at the age of 18.

== Professional career ==
Some of the clubs that Zaras played with during his professional career include ICBS, AEL 1964, Kolossos Rodou, Kavala, and KAOD.

He joined Aris Thessaloniki in the summer of 2015. He officially signed with PAOK on June 27, 2017. On August 9, 2019, Zaras signed with the third Thessaloniki Greek Basket League club, Iraklis.

On August 13, 2020, Zaras agreed to return to Kolossos Rodou after ten years. During the 2020–21 season, Zaras averaged a career-high 11 points, 1.9 rebounds and 2 assists, playing 25 minutes per game. He ranked fourth in three-point shooting (40/83, 48.2% from beyond the arc) in the Greek Basket League and first among all Greek players.

On August 4, 2021, Zaras moved to Larisa. In 30 league games, he averaged 8.5 points, while shooting 42.2% from three-point range, along with 1.3 rebounds and 1.6 assists in around 22 minutes per contest.

On September 16, 2022, Zaras signed with Lavrio. In 16 league games during the 2022–23 season, he averaged 7.4 points, 0.9 rebounds and 1 assist in 17 minutes per contest. On July 31, 2023, he renewed his contract with the club and recorded his 15th season in the Greek Basket League. During the 2023–24 season, Zaras averaged 5.7 points and 1 assist in 16 minutes per game over 22 domestic league appearances.

On August 30, 2024, Zaras renewed his contract with Lavrio for a third consecutive season. Before the 2024–25 season, Zaras had recorded 384 Greek Basket League appearances, 28 Greek Cup games and 61 games in European competitions.

On July 9, 2025, Zaras returned to PAOK after six years. He spent the 2025–26 season with the club, in what proved to be the final season of his playing career.

== Post-playing career ==
On August 14, 2026, PAOK announced that Zaras had retired from professional basketball. The club also announced that he would remain with PAOK in a new role as head of its development program.
