= Vlado Janković =

Serbian-Greek basketball player (born 1990)

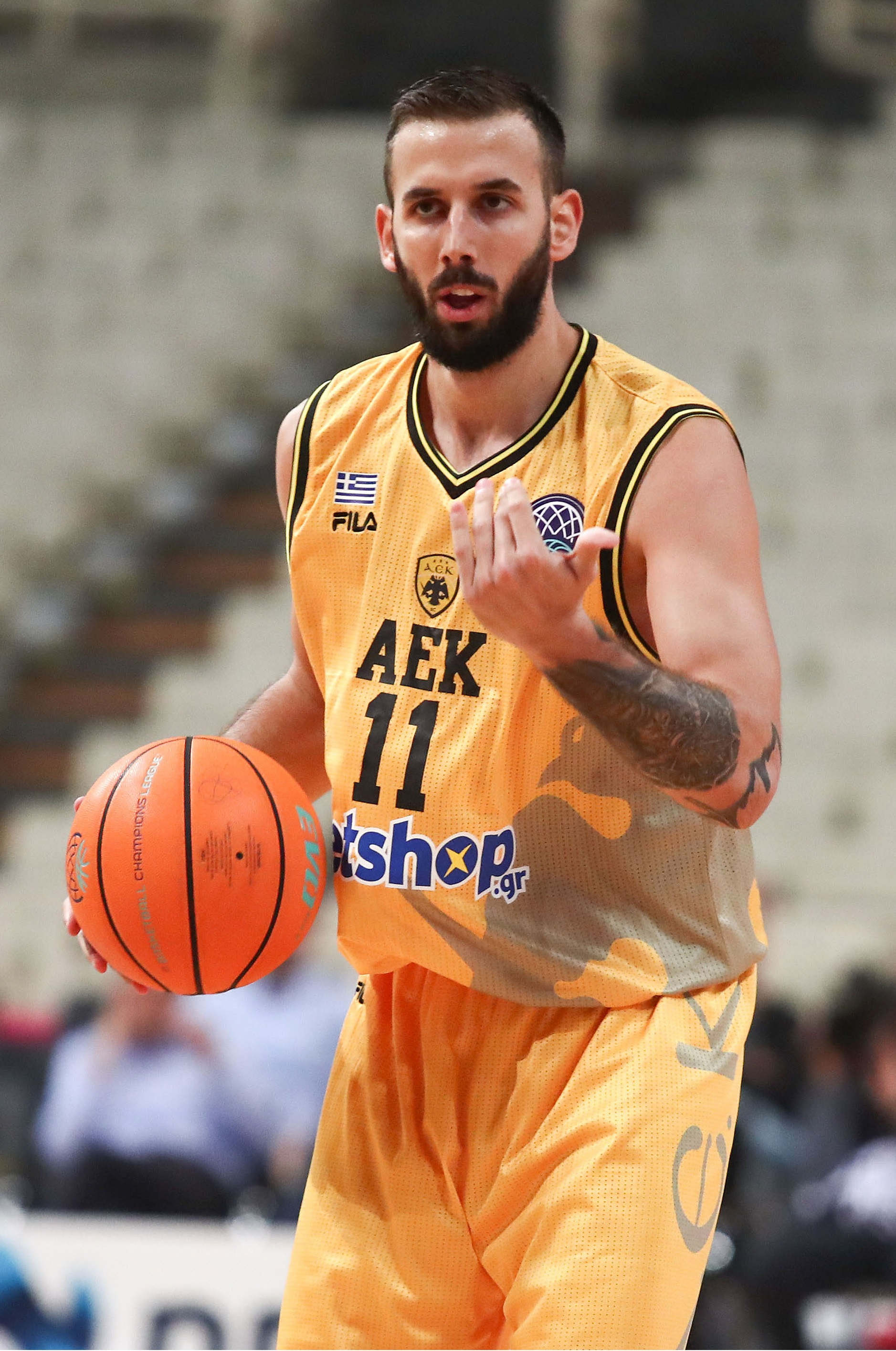
- Janković with AEK BC in 2019

Personal information
- Born: March 3, 1990 (age 36) Belgrade, SR Serbia, SFR Yugoslavia
- Listed height: 2.04 m (6 ft 8 in)
- Listed weight: 104 kg (229 lb)

Career information
- NBA draft: 2012: undrafted
- Playing career: 2007–2026
- Position: Small forward / power forward
- Number: 12, 16, 8, 11, 33

Career history
- 2007–2013: Panionios
- 2008–2009: →Mega Vizura
- 2013–2016: Panathinaikos
- 2016–2017: Valencia
- 2016–2017: →Aris Thessaloniki
- 2017–2018: Andorra
- 2018–2019: Holargos
- 2019–2021: AEK Athens
- 2021–2022: PAOK Thessaloniki
- 2023: AEK Athens
- 2023–2024: Karditsa
- 2025–2026: Peristeri

Career highlights
- Greek League champion (2014); 4× Greek Cup winner (2014–2016, 2020); All-Greek League Team (2013); Greek League Most Improved Player (2013); Greek All-Star (2013)
Medals
Men's basketball
Representing Greece
FIBA Europe Under-20 Championship
Gold medal – first place	2009 Greece	U-20 Team
Silver medal – second place	2010 Croatia	U-20 Team
FIBA Under-19 World Cup
Silver medal – second place	2009 New Zealand	U-19 Team
Albert Schweitzer Tournament
Gold medal – first place	2008 Germany	U-18 Team
FIBA Europe Under-18 Championship
Gold medal – first place	2008 Greece	U-18 Team

Vladimir "Vlado" Janković (Greek: Βλαδίμηρος "Βλάντο" Γιάνκοβιτς, Vladimiros "Vlando" Yankovits, Serbian: Владимир "Владо" Јанковић; born March 3, 1990) is a retired Serbian–Greek professional basketball player who mainly played for major Greek teams and the Greek national team. In his last season he was the team captain for Peristeri of the Greek Basketball League. Standing at 2.02 m (6 ft 7 1/2 in), he mainly played at the small forward position. He is the son of the late Serbian professional basketball player Boban Janković.

== Early life ==
Janković was born March 3, 1990, in Belgrade, SR Serbia, SFR Yugoslavia. He is the son of the famous late Serbian professional basketball player Boban Janković, who was paralyzed during a Greek Basket League playoff game between Panionios and Panathinaikos in 1993.

Janković moved to Nea Smyrni, Greece with his family at the age of two, when his father, Boban, joined the Greek club Panionios for the 1992–93 season.

== Professional career ==
Janković began his professional career with the Greek Basket League club Panionios in 2007. In 2008, he moved to the Serbian club Mega, on loan from Panionios. He then returned to Panionios in 2009.

On 20 June 2013, Janković joined the Greek club Panathinaikos. He was announced as a new player of Panathinaikos, for the following three years, along with his Panionios teammate Nikos Pappas. During his second season at the club, he switched his jersey number from 16 to 8.

Janković played in the 2016 NBA Summer League, with the Summer League squad of the New Orleans Pelicans.

On August 3, 2016, Janković signed with the Spanish Liga ACB club Valencia. On October 31, 2016, he was loaned to the Greek club Aris Thessaloniki, for the rest of the season. On July 20, 2017, Janković signed with Andorra.

He spent the entire Greek League 2018–19 season with Holargos, averaging a career-high 13.8 points, 5.4 rebounds and 2.7 assists per game.

On November 11, 2019, Janković signed a seven-month contract with AEK Athens. He signed a two-year extension with the team on August 3, 2020.

On July 23, 2021, Janković moved back to Thessaloniki for PAOK. In 23 games, he averaged 8 points, 4.9 rebounds and 2.7 assists in 25 minutes per contest.

On January 20, 2023, Janković signed back with AEK Athens for the rest of the season. In 12 league games, he averaged 9.4 points, 3.9 rebounds and 1.9 assists in 21 minutes per contest.

Janković then led a successful 2023–2024 campaign with Karditsa.

On January 4, 2025, Janković signed with Peristeri for the rest of the season. On July 15, 2025, he renewed his contract for an additional year.

== National team career ==
=== Greek junior national team ===
Janković won the gold medal at the 2008 FIBA Europe Under-18 Championship, while playing with the junior Greek national basketball team. Janković also won the silver medal at the 2009 FIBA Under-19 World Cup and the gold medal at the 2009 FIBA Europe Under-20 Championship. He also won the silver medal at the 2010 FIBA Europe Under-20 Championship with Greece's junior national team.

=== Greek senior national team ===
Janković became a member of the senior men's Greek national basketball team in 2013, when he was invited to train with the team during its preparation phase before the EuroBasket 2013.

== Personal life ==
In September 2012, Jankovic began dating former Greek model Elena Papadopoulou and on July 21, 2018, they married in Paros. On September 7, 2019, Papadopoulou gave birth to their first child, a son Maximo Jankovic.

== Career statistics ==
Legend
GP	Games played	GS	Games started	MPG	Minutes per game
FG%	Field-goal percentage	3P%	3-point field-goal percentage	FT%	Free-throw percentage
RPG	Rebounds per game	APG	Assists per game	SPG	Steals per game
BPG	Blocks per game	PPG	Points per game	PIR	Performance index rating
**Bold**	Career high

=== EuroLeague ===
Year	Team	GP	GS	MPG	FG%	3P%	FT%	RPG	APG	SPG	BPG	PPG	PIR
2013–14	Panathinaikos	17	1	3.6	.250	.250	.500	.6	.2	.2	.1	.6	.4
2014–15	Panathinaikos	**27**	**27**	**26.3**	.370	.333	**.741**	**3.7**	**2.1**	**1.1**	**.2**	**8.3**	**8.6**
2015–16	Panathinaikos	22	7	15.7	**.528**	**.400**	.536	2.5	1.4	.5	.1	5.7	6.2
Career		66	35	16.9	.412	.347	.663	2.5	1.4	.7	.1	5.4	5.7

== Awards and accomplishments ==
=== Pro career ===
- Greek League All-Star: (2013)
- Greek League Most Improved Player: (2013)
- Greek League Best Five: (2013)
- 3× Greek Cup Winner: (2014, 2015, 2016)
- Greek League Champion: (2014)
- Basketball Champions League runner up : (2020)
