= Alexandreio Melathron (Nick Galis Hall) =

Indoor sports arena in Thessaloniki, Greece

Alexandreion Melathron Nick Galis Hall
- Palais des Sports
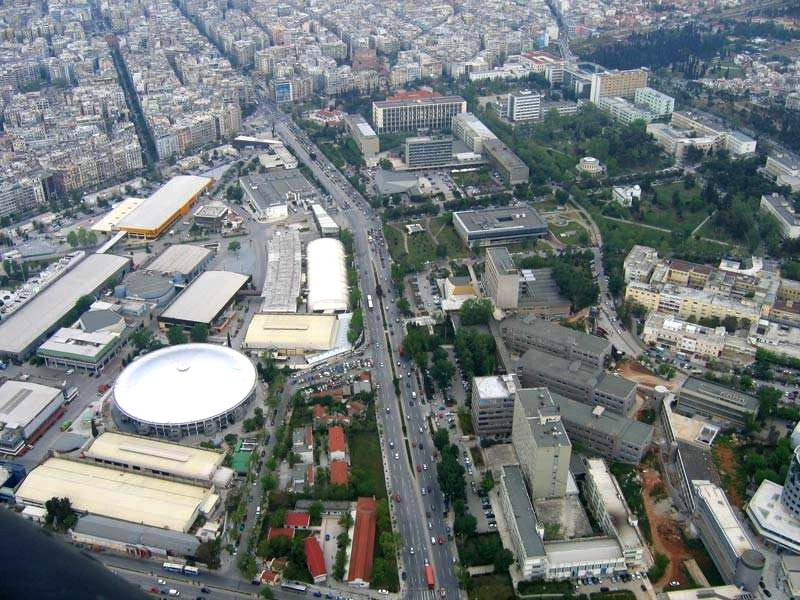
- Aerial view of the Trade Fair area. The building down left is Alexandreion.
- Interactive map of Alexandreion Melathron Nick Galis Hall
- Full name: Alexandreion Melathron Nick Galis Hall
- Former names: Alexandreion Melathron
- Location: Thessaloniki, Greece
- Coordinates: 40°37′36.83″N 22°57′25.99″E
- Owner: Greek Ministry of Culture, General Secretariat of Sports
- Capacity: Basketball: 5,138 (permanent seating); 6,000 (with temporary seating)
- Surface: Parquet
- Public transit: Panepistimio

Construction
- Opened: 29 June 1966
- Renovated: 2004, 2015
- Architects: Petros Gianettos, M. Guyon and T. Jeanblock

Tenants
- Aris Thessaloniki B.C. (1966–present); PAOK Thessaloniki B.C. (1966–2000)

Alexandreion Melathron, Nick Galis Hall (since 2013) (Greek: Αλεξάνδρειον Μέλαθρον, Σάλα Νίκος Γκάλης, από το 2013) is an indoor sports arena that is located in Thessaloniki, Greece. It is also often referred to as Palais des Sports (Greek: Παλαί ντε Σπορ).

The arena is mainly used to host basketball and volleyball games. The arena's main hall, called Nick Galis Hall, has a permanent seating capacity of 5,138, and a capacity of 6,000 with temporary seating, for basketball games. The arena also contains a practice court, club offices, shops, and a museum dedicated to the Aris basketball club. The arena hosts the home games of Aris Thessaloniki B.C., a member of the Greek League.

== Location ==
The Alexandreion Melathron Nikos Galis Hall indoor arena is located in downtown Thessaloniki, inside the International Trade Fair grounds. Bus lines #2, #7, #8, #10, #14, #27, #31, and #58, running along Egnatia Avenue, stop almost in front of the arena. Ιn 2020, the new metro station, "Panepistimio", which is located near to the arena, will open.

== Construction ==
The arena was designed by the architects P. Gianettos, M. Guyon and T. Jeanblock between 1960 and 1962. It was built in 1966. The structure shares two of the architects with the Palais des Sports de Gerland in Lyon and has many similarities.

The building was redeveloped and updated in 2004, in preparation for the Athens 2004 Olympic Games. The updates involved reconstruction of all the building's external and internal areas. Apart from what is directly visible to everybody, other works included new electrical and mechanical updates, air-conditioning, and audiovisual facilities. New seats, CCTV, and new lighting were also installed.

These updates resulted in a lower permanent seating capacity (5,138 compared to the previous 6,000) for Alexandreion Arena, which reopened its gates in late 2004. The arena was again updated in 2015.

== History ==
The arena was named after Alexander the Great, the king (basileus) of the ancient Greek kingdom of Macedonia. It is also commonly referred to as the "Palais des Sports" (meaning "Sports Palace", in French). Under its former names, the arena was the first large indoor basketball arena built in Greece, and remained the largest until the year 1985, when the Peace and Friendship Stadium in Athens, was completed and opened to the public.

Being part of the Thessaloniki International Fair, the arena also serves for many purposes other than sports.

On May 8, 2013, at an event honoring the legendary former Aris' and the Greek National Team's player, Nikos Galis, the Deputy Minister of Culture of Greece, Giannis Ioannidis, announced that the main hall of the arena was to be renamed to "Nick Galis Hall".

== Ownership ==
The arena is owned and operated by the Greek Ministry of Culture's General Secretariat of Sports.

== See also ==
- List of indoor arenas in Greece

Preceded by Pavilhão Atlântico; Lisbon	FIBA Under-19 World Cup; Final Venue; 2003	Succeeded by SPC Vojvodina; Novi Sad
