= Spyros Mourtos =

Greek basketball player (born 1990)

Spyros Mourtos Σπύρος Μούρτος
Free agent
- Position: Small forward / shooting guard

Personal information
- Born: December 5, 1990 (age 35) Cholargos, Greece
- Listed height: 6 ft 6 in (1.98 m)
- Listed weight: 185 lb (84 kg)

Career information
- Playing career: 2008–present

Career history
- 2008–2018: Aris
- 2010–2011: → OFI
- 2011–2012: → Ikaroi Serron
- 2018–2020: Ifaistos Limnou
- 2020–2021: Larisa
- 2021–2022: Ionikos Nikaias
Medals
Men's basketball
Representing Greece
FIBA Europe Under-20 Championship
Gold medal – first place	2009 Greece	Under-20
Silver medal – second place	2010 Croatia	Under-20

Spyridon "Spyros" Mourtos (alternate spellings: Spiridon, Spiros) (Greek: Σπύρος Μούρτος; born December 5, 1990) is a Greek professional basketball player who last played for Ionikos Nikaias of the Greek Basket League. He is 1.98 m (6 ft 6 in) tall. He mainly plays at the small forward position, but he can also operate as a point guard and shooting guard.

== Professional career ==
Mourtos began his pro career in 2008, with the Greek League club Aris. He was then loaned to OFI of the semi-pro Greek 3rd Division, for the 2010–11 season, and then loaned to Ikaroi Serron of the Greek 2nd Division for the 2011–12 season. He then returned to Aris for the 2012–13 season.

He renewed his contract with Aris for 3 more years, after the 2015–16 season ended. He eventually became the team captain of Aris.

After playing for two seasons with Ifaistos Limnou (and captaining the team), Mourtos signed with Larisa on August 25, 2020. On September 17, 2021, Mourtos signed with Ionikos Nikaias, after spending the preseason with them.

== National team career ==
Mourtos was a member of the Greek junior national teams. With the junior national teams of Greece, he won the gold medal at the 2009 FIBA Europe Under-20 Championship, and the silver medal at the 2010 FIBA Europe Under-20 Championship.

== Awards and accomplishments ==
=== Greek junior national team ===
- 2009 FIBA Europe Under-20 Championship: Gold
- 2010 FIBA Europe Under-20 Championship: Silver
