= Vassilis Symtsak =

Greek basketball player (born 1981)

Vassilis Symtsak Βασίλης Σίμτσακ
Panathinaikos
- Title: Assistant coach
- League: Greek Basketball League; EuroLeague

Personal information
- Born: 3 March 1981 (age 45) Athens, Greece
- Listed height: 6 ft 9.5 in (2.07 m)
- Listed weight: 260 lb (118 kg)

Career information
- Playing career: 2003–2018
- Position: Center
- Number: 14, 17
- Coaching career: 2018–present

Career history

Playing
- 2000–2006: A.C. Doukas
- 2006–2007: Sporting
- 2007–2008: AEK Athens
- 2008–2009: PAOK Thessaloniki
- 2009–2010: Trikala
- 2010–2012: Kavala
- 2012–2013: Ikaros Kallitheas
- 2013–2014: Panionios
- 2014–2017: Aris Thessaloniki
- 2017–2018: Peristeri

Coaching
- 2018–2021: UNICS Kazan (assistant)
- 2021–2022: Panathinaikos (assistant)
- 2022–2023: Tofaş (assistant)
- 2023–present: Panathinaikos (assistant)

Career highlights
- 2× Greek 2nd Division champion (2007, 2018); As assistant coach: EuroLeague champion (2024); Greek Super Cup winner (2021); Greek League champion (2024); Greek Cup winner (2025)

Vassilis Symtsak (alternative spellings: Vasilis, Vasileios, Simtsak) (Greek: Βασίλης Σίμτσακ; (born 3 March 1981) is a Greek professional basketball coach and former player, currently an assistant coach for Panathinaikos of the Greek Basketball League (GBL) and the EuroLeague, under head coach Ergin Ataman. Standing at 2.07 m (6 ft 9 1/2 in), he mainly played at the center position.

== Professional career ==
Some of the clubs that Symtsak has played with in his pro career include: Doukas, Sporting, AEK Athens, PAOK, Trikala 2000, Kavala, Ikaros Kallitheas, and Panionios. In 2014, he signed with the Greek League club Aris. He then re-signed with Aris in 2015.

After the end of the 2016–17 season, Symtsak completed 10 seasons in the Greek Basket League, counting 1,068 points, 1,095 rebounds, 154 assists, 116 steals, and 43 blocks, in a total of 258 appearances.

On 19 July 2017, Symtsak penned a single-season deal with Greek A2 Basket League club Peristeri B.C. Averaging 6.8 points, 5.5 rebounds and 2.4 assists per game, he helped the club with his experience to celebrate the championship and the return to Greek Basket League after five years.

On July 21, 2022, he signed with Tofaş of the Turkish Basketbol Süper Ligi as an assistant coach. On February 21, 2023, he returned to Panathinaikos as an assistant to Christos Serelis.

== Personal life ==
Symtsak is of mixed Polish and Greek descent. His father is Polish, while his mother originates from a Greek family that found refuge in Poland, after the Greek Civil War.

== Awards and accomplishments ==
- 2× Greek 2nd Division Champion: (2007, 2018)

As assistant coach

- EuroLeague Champion (2024) (with Panathinaikos)
- Greek League champion: 2024 (with Panathinaikos)
- Greek Super Cup Winner: 2021 (with Panathinaikos)
