= 2016 Greek Basket League Playoffs =

The 2016 Greek Basket League Playoffs included the top eight place finishing teams of the 2015–16 Greek Basket League regular season.

== Bracket ==
Teams in bold won the playoff series. Numbers to the left of each team indicate the team's original playoff seeding. Numbers to the right indicate the score of each playoff game.

Quarter-finals
1	**Olympiacos**	**2**
8	Rethymno Cretan Kings	0
4	**AEK**	**2**
5	PAOK	1
2	**Panathinaikos**	**2**
7	Kolossos Rodou	0
3	**Aris**	**2**
6	Nea Kifissia	0

Semi-finals
1	**Olympiacos**	**3**
4	AEK	0
2	**Panathinaikos**	**3**
3	Aris	2

Finals
1	**Olympiacos**	**3**
2	Panathinaikos	1
Third place
3	Aris	1
4	**AEK**	**3**

== Quarter-finals ==
In the quarterfinals, teams playing against each other had to win two games to win the series. Thus, if one team wins two games before all three games have been played, the games that remain are omitted. The team that finished in the higher regular season place, played the first and the third (if it was necessary) games of the series at home.

Team 1	Agg.	Team 2	Game 1	Game 2	Game 3
**Olympiacos**	2–0	Rethymno Cretan Kings	102–71	77–73	—
**AEK**	2–1	PAOK	78–83	68–59	61–54
**Panathinaikos**	2–0	Kolossos Rodou	91–63	80–71	—
**Aris**	2–0	Nea Kifissia	78–60	108–103	—

=== Game 1 ===
16 April 2016	**Aris**	**78**–60	Nea Kifissia	Thessaloniki
18:00 (EET)	Scoring by quarter: 13–**20**, **20**–15, **19**–13, **26**–12
	Pts: Waters 18; Rebs: Symtsak 10; Asts: McNeal 7 PIR: McNeal 27	Report	Pts: Hogue 14; Rebs: Hogue 8 Asts: Stamatis 4 PIR: Hogue 19	Arena: Nick Galis Hall; Referees: Christos Christodoulou, Petros Papapetrou, Asterios Goumas

16 April 2016	AEK	78–**83**	**PAOK**	Athens
18:30 (EET)	Scoring by quarter: **24**–16, 17–17, **20**–19, 17–**31**
	Pts: Mavrokefalidis 19; Rebs: Mavroeidis 10; Asts: Brown 6 PIR: Brown, Mavrokefalidis 13	Report	Pts: Hatcher 21; Rebs: Margaritis 6 Asts: Duvnjak 4 PIR: Hatcher 24	Arena: O.A.C.A. Referees: Spyridon Godas, Ioannis Foufis, Alexandros Psarianos

20 April 2016	**Olympiacos**	**102**–71	Rethymno Cretan Kings	Piraeus
17:30 (EET)	Scoring by quarter: **22**–15, **23**–21, **31**–16, **26**–19
	Pts: Papanikolaou 21; Rebs: Papanikolaou 7 Asts: Lojeski 6 PIR: Lojeski 27	Report	Pts: Stone 19; Rebs: Stone 10; Asts: Harrow 6 PIR: Stone 18	Arena: Peace and Friendship Stadium; Referees: Kostas Poursanidis, Georgios Theonas, Stelios Simeonidis

25 April 2016	**Panathinaikos**	**91**–63	Kolossos Rodou	Athens
17:00 (EET)	Scoring by quarter: **34**–14, 15–**17**, **24**–17, **18**–15
	Pts: Feldeine 20; Rebs: Calathes 9 Asts: Calathes 7 PIR: Calathes 23	Report	Pts: Larentzakis 14; Rebs: Larentzakis, McGhee 6 Asts: four players 2 PIR: Larentzakis 13	Arena: O.A.C.A. Referees: Argiris Kaldiris, Vasilis Tsonos, Vaso Tsaroucha

=== Game 2 ===
23 April 2016	Nea Kifissia	103–**108**(OT)	**Aris**	Kifissia, Athens
18:00 (EET)	Scoring by quarter: **28**–22, **20**–12, 17–**27**, 16–**20**, Overtime: 22–**27**
	Pts: El-Amin 25; Rebs: Gikas 8 Asts: Kaselakis 3 PIR: Kaselakis 27	Report	Pts: Waters 29; Rebs: Cohen 11; Asts: Waters 9 PIR: Waters, White 32	Arena: Zirineio Indoor Hall; Referees: Antonis Anastopoulos, Christos Panagiotou, Dimitris Tzafleris

23 April 2016	PAOK	59–**68**	**AEK**	Thessaloniki
20:00 (EET)	Scoring by quarter: **21**–17, 12–**29**, **9**–7, **17**–15
	Pts: Vasileiadis 12; Rebs: Clanton 8 Asts: Vasileiadis 6 PIR: Clanton 14	Report	Pts: Milošević 17; Rebs: Mavrokefalidis 12; Asts: Brown 4 PIR: Milošević 25	Arena: P.A.O.K. Sports Arena; Referees: Anastasios Piloidis, Kostas Mitsopoulos, Stefanos Maglogiannis

24 April 2016	Rethymno Cretan Kings	73–**77**	**Olympiacos**	Rethymno, Crete
17:00 (EET)	Scoring by quarter: **16**–13, 20–**27**, 13–**26**, **24**–11
	Pts: Harrow 17; Rebs: Schaftenaar 8 Asts: Carter, Madden 3 PIR: Carter 17	Report	Pts: Warrick 17; Rebs: Warrick 6 Asts: Mantzaris 7 PIR: Warrick 18	Arena: Melina Merkouri Indoor Hall; Referees: Nickolaos Somos, Georgios Andrikopoulos, Giannis Pagonis

27 April 2016	Kolossos Rodou	71–**80**	**Panathinaikos**	Rhodes
17:00 (EET)	Scoring by quarter: **20**–19, 17–**27**, **21**–17, 13–**17**
	Pts: Lewis 14; Rebs: Georgallis 14; Asts: Releford 7 PIR: McGhee 18	Report	Pts: Gist 14; Rebs: Gist 10; Asts: Calathes 9 PIR: Gist 23	Arena: Venetokleio Indoor Hall; Referees: Anastasios Manos, Athanasios Deslis, Panagiotis Diamantis

=== Game 3 ===
27 April 2016	**AEK**	**61**–54	PAOK	Athens
18:45 (EET)	Scoring by quarter: **14**–13, **15**–14, **16**–12, **16**–15
	Pts: Mavroeidis 10; Rebs: Mavroeidis 11; Asts: Brown 3 PIR: Mavroeidis 15	Report	Pts: Tepić 22; Rebs: Clanton 7 Asts: Hatcher 9 PIR: Tepić 26	Arena: O.A.C.A. Referees: Elias Koromilas, Charalampos Karakatsounis, Konstantinos Stamatopoulos

== Semi-finals ==
In the semi-finals, teams playing against each other had to win three games to win the series. Thus, if one team won three games before all five games had been played, the games that remained were omitted. The team that finished in the higher regular season place played the first, the second, and the fifth (if it was necessary) games of the series at home.

Team 1	Agg.	Team 2	Game 1	Game 2	Game 3	Game 4	Game 5
**Olympiacos**	3–0	AEK	93–58	80–67	89–75	—	—
**Panathinaikos**	3–2	Aris	85–79	74–60	68–77	50–56	84–68

=== Game 1 ===
4 May 2016	**Olympiacos**	**93**–58	AEK	Piraeus
18:00 (EET)	Scoring by quarter: **21**–14, **31**–16, 18–18, **23**–10
	Pts: Spanoulis 15; Rebs: Mantzaris, Papanikolaou 5 Asts: Spanoulis 6 PIR: Spanoulis 18	Report	Pts: Mavroeidis 15; Rebs: Hairston 6 Asts: Mavrokefalidis 4 PIR: Mavroeidis 20	Arena: Peace and Friendship Stadium; Referees: Elias Koromilas, Charalampos Karakatsounis, Alexandros Psarianos

4 May 2016	**Panathinaikos**	**85**–79	Aris	Athens
20:00 (EET)	Scoring by quarter: 19–19, **27**–20, **21**–18, 18–**22**
	Pts: Calathes 21; Rebs: Raduljica 8 Asts: Calathes 8 PIR: Calathes 29	Report	Pts: McNeal 22; Rebs: McNeal 10; Asts: Waters 7 PIR: McNeal 21	Arena: O.A.C.A. Referees: Christos Christodoulou, Kostas Mitsopoulos, Dimitris Mpitis

=== Game 2 ===
6 May 2016	**Panathinaikos**	**74**–60	Aris	Athens
18:00 (EET)	Scoring by quarter: **24**–13, **13**–10, **21**–20, 16–**17**
	Pts: Calathes, Williams 12; Rebs: Fotsis 6 Asts: Calathes 7 PIR: Calathes 20	Report	Pts: Waters 15; Rebs: White 11; Asts: Waters 3 PIR: White 17	Arena: O.A.C.A. Referees: Chrysostomos Schinas, Nickolaos Somos, Christos Panagiotou

6 May 2016	**Olympiacos**	**80**–67	AEK	Piraeus
20:00 (EET)	Scoring by quarter: **23**–22, **21**–7, **17**–16, 19–**22**
	Pts: Lojeski 17; Rebs: Warrick 7 Asts: Spanoulis 9 PIR: Lojeski 23	Report	Pts: Mavroeidis 16; Rebs: Mavroeidis 10; Asts: Milošević 4 PIR: Mavroeidis 24	Arena: Peace and Friendship Stadium; Referees: Anastasios Piloidis, Georgios Poursanidis, Konstantinos Stamatopoulos

=== Game 3 ===
9 May 2016	**Aris**	**77**–68	Panathinaikos	Thessaloniki
19:00 (EET)	Scoring by quarter: **23**–22, **19**–15, **17**–14, **18**–17
	Pts: McNeal, Waters 21; Rebs: Mourtos, Symtsak 6 Asts: Waters 4 PIR: Waters 19	Report	Pts: Raduljica, Williams 14; Rebs: Charalampopoulos 10; Asts: Diamantidis 5 PIR: Williams 16	Arena: Nick Galis Hall; Referees: Spyridon Godas, Petros Papapetrou, Dimitris Tzafleris

10 May 2016	AEK	75–**89**	**Olympiacos**	Athens
19:00 (EET)	Scoring by quarter: **21**–18, **20**–13, 20–**24**, 14–**34**
	Pts: Brown 17; Rebs: Mavroeidis, Milošević 6 Asts: Brown 5 PIR: Brown 19	Report	Pts: Hackett 18; Rebs: Hunter 7 Asts: Hackett 5 PIR: Hackett 22	Arena: O.A.C.A. Referees: Panagiotis Anastasopoulos, Ioannis Foufis, Asterios Goumas

=== Game 4 ===
11 May 2016	**Aris**	**56**–50	Panathinaikos	Thessaloniki
19:00 (EET)	Scoring by quarter: 8–**12**, 11–**17**, **19**–5, **18**–16
	Pts: McNeal 16; Rebs: White 14; Asts: Waters 5 PIR: White 25	Report	Pts: Williams 19; Rebs: Hunter 11; Asts: Calathes; PIR: Williams 16	Arena: Nick Galis Hall; Referees: Anastasios Piloidis, Kostas Mitsopoulos, Athanasios Deslis

=== Game 5 ===
14 May 2016	**Panathinaikos**	**84**–68	Aris	Athens
18:00 (EET)	Scoring by quarter: **24**–16, **16**–14, 17–**20**, **27**–20
	Pts: Feldeine 23; Rebs: Calathes, Feldeine, Gist 5 Asts: Feldeine 4 PIR: Feldeine 30	Report	Pts: McNeal 18; Rebs: Mourtos 11; Asts: Waters 4 PIR: White 19	Arena: O.A.C.A. Referees: Elias Koromilas, Georgios Poursanidis, Anastasios Manos

== Third place ==
In the series for the third place, teams playing against each other had to win three games to win the 3rd place in the final rankings of the season. Thus, if one team won three games before all five games had been played, the remaining games were omitted. The team that finished in the higher regular season place, played the first, the third, and the fifth (if it was necessary) games of the series at home.

Team 1	Agg.	Team 2	Game 1	Game 2	Game 3	Game 4	Game 5
Aris	1–3	**AEK**	67–77	84–89	74–69	81–89	—

=== Game 1 ===
18 May 2016	Aris	67–**77**	**AEK**	Thessaloniki
19:00 (EET)	Scoring by quarter: **20**–13, **20**–15, 14–**22**, 10–**27**
	Pts: White 15; Rebs: White 8 Asts: Waters 4 PIR: White 18	Report	Pts: Brown 20; Rebs: Milošević 9 Asts: Brown 4 PIR: Milošević 19	Arena: Nick Galis Hall; Referees: Anastasios Piloidis, Charalampos Karakatsounis, Nickolaos Somas

=== Game 2 ===
21 May 2016	**AEK**	**89**–84	Aris	Athens
19:00 (EET)	Scoring by quarter: **24**–14, **24**–21, 20–**26**, 21–**23**
	Pts: Šakota 22; Rebs: Carter 7 Asts: Brown 5 PIR: Šakota 26	Report	Pts: Zaras 22; Rebs: White 7 Asts: Waters 7 PIR: White 24	Arena: O.A.C.A. Referees: Spyridon Godas, Ioannis Foufis, Dimitris Mpitis

=== Game 3 ===
25 May 2016	**Aris**	**74**–69	AEK	Thessaloniki
19:00 (EET)	Scoring by quarter: 16–**18**, 14–**18**, **19**–18, **25**–15
	Pts: Symtsak 22; Rebs: Symtsak 10; Asts: McNeal 8 PIR: Symtsak 25	Report	Pts: Carter 18; Rebs: Milošević 13; Asts: Hairston, Milošević 3 PIR: Hairston 24	Arena: Nick Galis Hall; Referees: Christos Christodoulou, Chrysostomos Schinas, Konstantinos Stamatopoulos

=== Game 4 ===
28 May 2016	**AEK**	**89**–81	Aris	Athens
19:00 (EET)	Scoring by quarter: **22**–18, 21–21, **30**–25, 16–**17**
	Pts: Hairston 24; Rebs: Milošević 8 Asts: Hairston 5 PIR: Hairston 34	Report	Pts: Waters 17; Rebs: White 7 Asts: Xanthopoulos 4 PIR: White 18	Arena: O.A.C.A. Referees: Anastasios Piloidis, Charalampos Karakatsounis, Petros Papapetrou

== Finals ==
In the finals, teams playing against each other had to win three games to win the title. Thus, if one team won three games before all five games were played, the remaining games were omitted. The team that finished in the higher regular season place, played the first, the third, and the fifth (if it was necessary) games of the series at home.

Team 1	Agg.	Team 2	Game 1	Game 2	Game 3	Game 4	Game 5
**Olympiacos**	3–1	Panathinaikos	81–83	68–66	77–72	82–81	—

=== Game 2 ===
22 May 2016	Panathinaikos	66–**68**	**Olympiacos**	Athens
19:30 (EET)	Scoring by quarter: **14**–11, 17–**21**, 15–**18**, **20**–18
	Pts: Pappas 12; Rebs: Calathes 7 Asts: Calathes 6 PIR: Pappas 16	Report	Pts: Printezis 20; Rebs: Printezis 9 Asts: Lojeski 5 PIR: Printezis 24	Arena: O.A.C.A. Referees: Antonis Anastopoulos, Elias Koromilas, Anastasios Manos

=== Game 3 ===
26 May 2016	**Olympiacos**	**77**–72	Panathinaikos	Piraeus
19:30 (EET)	Scoring by quarter: 17–**21**, **24**–23, 16–**18**, **20**–10
	Pts: Spanoulis 22; Rebs: Printezis 7 Asts: Hackett 3 PIR: Hackett 16	Report	Pts: Feldeine 17; Rebs: Calathes, Fotsis, Papagiannis 5 Asts: Calathes, Diamantidis, Feldeine 3 PIR: Calathes, Diamantidis 14	Arena: Peace and Friendship Stadium; Referees: Anastasios Piloidis, Charalampos Karakatsounis, Christos Panagiotou

=== Game 4 ===
30 May 2016	Panathinaikos	81–**82**(OT)	**Olympiacos**	Athens
19:30 (EET)	Scoring by quarter: 16–**19**, **19**–12, 15–**21**, **13**–11, Overtime: 18–**19**
	Pts: Pappas 16; Rebs: Pappas 9 Asts: Diamantidis 6 PIR: Diamantidis 24	Report	Pts: Spanoulis 25; Rebs: Agravanis 9 Asts: Spanoulis 6 PIR: Agravanis, Hunter 18	Arena: O.A.C.A. Referees: Christos Christodoulou, Chrysostomos Schinas, Kostas Mitsopoulos
