= J'Covan Brown =

American basketball player (born 1990)

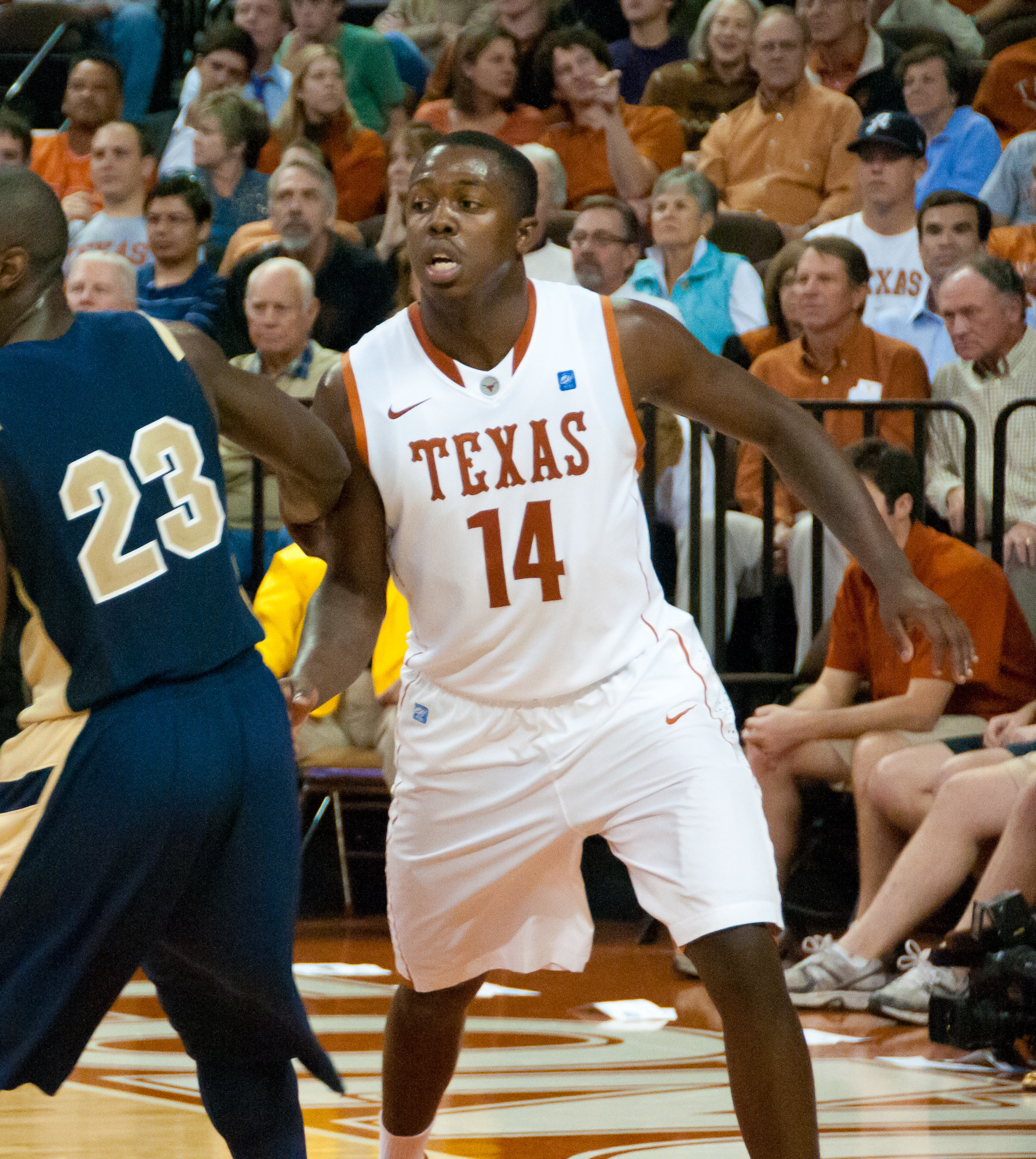
- Brown with the Texas Longhorns in 2010

Free Agent
- Position: Point guard / shooting guard

Personal information
- Born: February 14, 1990 (age 36) Port Arthur, Texas, U.S.
- Listed height: 6 ft 2 in (1.88 m)
- Listed weight: 202 lb (92 kg)

Career information
- High school: Memorial (Port Arthur, Texas)
- College: Texas (2009–2012)
- NBA draft: 2012: undrafted
- Playing career: 2012–present

Career history
- 2012: Rethymno Aegean
- 2013–2014: KAOD
- 2014: Cañeros de La Romana
- 2014–2015: Astana
- 2015–2016: Türk Telekom
- 2016: AEK Athens
- 2016–2017: Pınar Karşıyaka
- 2017–2018: Hapoel Gilboa Galil
- 2018–2021: Hapoel Jerusalem
- 2021–2024: Hapoel Tel Aviv
- 2024–2025: Hapoel Afula
- 2025–2026: Darüşşafaka

Career highlights
- All-EuroCup Second Team (2023); EuroCup assists leader (2023); 2× Israeli State Cup winner (2019, 2020); Israeli State Cup Final MVP (2020); Israeli League Cup winner (2019); Kazakhstan League champion (2015); First-team All-Big 12 (2012)

J'Covan Marquis Brown (born February 14, 1990) is an American professional basketball player who last played for Darüşşafaka of the Türkiye Basketbol Ligi (TBL). He played college basketball for the Texas Longhorns before playing professionally in Greece, the Dominican Republic, Kazakhstan, Turkey and Israel. Standing at 6 ft 2 in (1.88 m), he plays both the point guard and shooting guard positions.

== High school career ==
Brown attended Memorial High School in Port Arthur, Texas, where he averaged 29.9 points per game while playing in 11 contests during his senior season. Brown led Memorial to a 29–6 record while averaging 27 points, six assists, five rebounds and three steals per game and earned all-state, all-region and first-team All-District 21-5A accolades in his junior season.

== College career ==
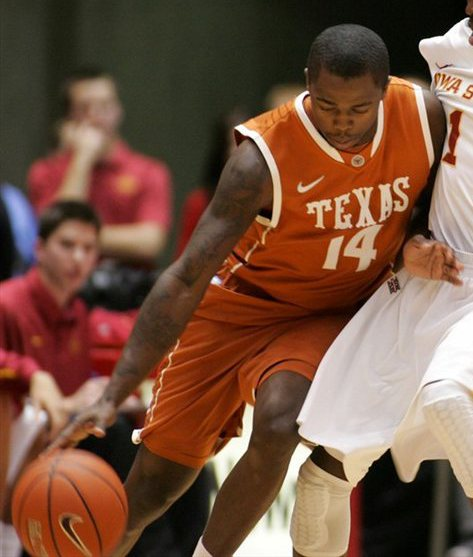
J'Covan Brown with the Texas Longhorns in January 2012

Brown played college basketball for The University of Texas's Longhorns from 2009 to 2012. In his senior year at Texas, Brown averaged 20.1 points, 3.8 assists, 3.4 rebounds and 1.2 steals per game, almost two times the amount of the team's second-leading scorer, Sheldon McClellan and was able to take his team to the Big 12 Tournament Semifinals in 2012.

On March 5, 2012, Brown earned a spot in the All-Big 12 First team.

On April 2, 2012, Brown declared for the 2012 NBA draft after completing his junior year at Texas.

== Professional career ==
=== Rethymno Aegean (2012) ===
On August 28, 2012, Brown started his professional career with the Greek team Rethymno Aegean, signing a one-year deal. However, on December 1, 2012, he parted ways with the team after appearing in six games, averaging 9.3 points per game.

=== KAOD and Caneros de La Romana (2013–2014) ===
In July 2013, Brown joined the New York Knicks for the 2013 NBA Summer League.

On November 5, 2013, Brown returned to Greece for a second stint, signing with KAOD for the rest of the season. Brown averaged 17.2 points per game and finished as the Greek League second best scorer.

On May 17, 2014, Brown signed with the Dominican team Caneros de La Romana for the 2014 LNB Season.

=== Astana (2014–2015) ===
On August 8, 2014, Brown signed a one-year deal with the Kazakh team BC Astana. On November 11, 2014, Brown recorded a season-high 34 points, shooting 12-of-15 from the field, along with seven rebounds and three assists in a 106–102 win over Tofaş. He was subsequently named EuroChallenge Week 2 Top Performer.

Brown finished the season as the EuroChallenge third leading scorer with 17.5 points per game. He helped Astana to win the 2015 Kazakhstan Basketball Championship, as well as reaching the 2015 VTB League Playoffs as the eighth seed, where they eventually were eliminated by CSKA Moscow.

=== Türk Telekom (2015–2016) ===
On June 4, 2015, Brown signed with the Turkish team Türk Telekom for the 2015–16 season. On December 6, 2015, Brown recorded a career-high 38 points, shooting 11-of-14 from the field, along with three assists in a 93–96 loss to Fenerbahçe.

=== AEK Athens (2016) ===
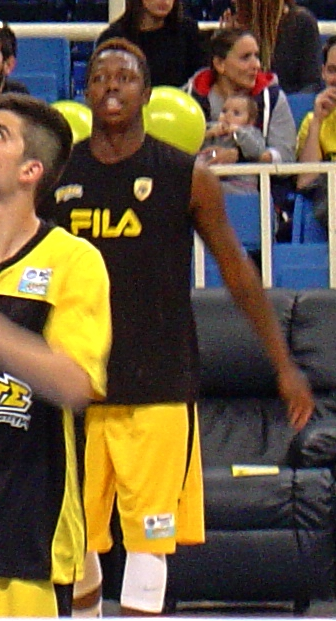
Brown with AEK Athens in February 2016

On January 19, 2016, Brown parted ways with Türk Telekom and signed with the Greek team AEK Athens for the rest of the season, with a prospect of renewal for another year. Brown helped AEK to reach the 2016 Greek League Semifinals, where they eventually were eliminated by Olympiacos.

=== Pınar Karşıyaka (2016–2017) ===
On July 14, 2016, Brown returned to Turkey for a second stint, signing a one-year deal with Pınar Karşıyaka. On December 13, 2016, Brown recorded a season-high 36 points, shooting 13-of-20 from the field, along with four assists and two steals in a 99–59 blowout win over Reyer Venezia.

Brown helped Karşıyaka to reach the 2017 Champions League Quarterfinals, where they eventually lost to Reyer Venezia.

=== Hapoel Gilboa Galil (2017–2018) ===
On September 12, 2017, Brown signed with the Israeli team Hapoel Gilboa Galil for the 2017–18 season. On November 13, 2017, Brown recorded 28 points, shooting 10-of-15 from the field, along with 8 assists, 5 rebounds and 3 steals in an 88–86 win over Hapoel Tel Aviv. He was subsequently named Israeli League Round 6 MVP. On April 9, 2018, Brown recorded a double-double of 32 points and 11 assists, shooting 6-of-6 from three-point range in a 94–91 win over Hapoel Holon. He was subsequently named Israeli League Round 22 MVP.

Brown helped Gilboa Galil to reach the 2018 Israeli League Playoffs, where they eventually lost to Hapoel Jerusalem. Brown finished the season as the League third assists leader (5.9 per game) and also averaged 17 points and 3.2 rebounds per game, shooting a career-high of 42.5 percent from 3-point range.

=== Hapoel Jerusalem (2018–2021) ===
On June 18, 2018, Brown signed a two-year deal with Hapoel Jerusalem. On February 2, 2019, Brown recorded a season-high 25 points, shooting 9-of-13 from the field, along with six rebounds and assists for 33 PIR in a 104–94 win over Maccabi Ashdod. On February 14, 2019, Brown helped Jerusalem to win the 2019 Israeli State Cup after an 82–67 win over Maccabi Rishon LeZion, scoring 19 points off the bench. On March 4, 2019, Brown was named Israeli League Player of the Month after averaging 20.0 points and 4.7 assists per game in three games played in February.

On February 13, 2020, Brown recorded 26 points, while shooting 10-of-21 from the field, along with six rebounds and five assists, leading Jerusalem to its sixth Israeli State Cup title after a 92–89 win over Ironi Nahariya. He was subsequently named the Final MVP. Brown averaged 14.8 points and 5.3 assists per game during the 2019–20 season. On August 13, 2020, he re-signed with Hapoel Jerusalem.

=== Hapoel Tel Aviv (2021–2024) ===
In summer 2021, he has signed with Hapoel Tel Aviv of the Israeli Premier League.

=== Darüşşafaka (2025–2026) ===
On September 11, 2025, he signed with Darüşşafaka of the Türkiye Basketbol Ligi (TBL).

== Personal life ==
Brown is the son of Johnny Ray and Angela Brown. His cousin, B. J. Tyler, is a former NBA player who also played for the University of Texas. Tyler earned third-team All-America honors by The Associated Press as a senior in 1993–94 and was the No. 20 overall pick in the 1994 NBA draft by the Philadelphia 76ers.

== Career statistics ==
Legend
GP	Games played	MPG	Minutes per game	FG%	Field goal percentage
3P%	3-point field goal percentage	FT%	Free throw percentage	RPG	Rebounds per game
APG	Assists per game	SPG	Steals per game	BPG	Blocks per game
PPG	Points per game	**Bold**	Career high		Led the league

=== College ===
Year	Team	GP	GS	MPG	FG%	3P%	FT%	RPG	APG	SPG	BPG	PPG
2009–10	Texas	33	9	21.7	.354	.288	**.883**	2.2	2.4	.8	.1	9.6
2010–11	Texas	**36**	0	21.5	.406	**.385**	.861	2.2	2.1	.9	**.2**	10.4
2011–12	Texas	34	**34**	**35.6**	**.417**	.369	.863	**3.4**	**3.8**	**1.2**	.1	**20.1**
**Career**		103	43	26.2	.398	.350	.867	2.6	2.8	1.0	.1	13.4

=== Domestic Leagues ===
Year	Team	League	GP	MPG	FG%	3P%	FT%	RPG	APG	SPG	BPG	PPG
2012–13	(Greece) Rethymno	GBL	6	19.5	.339	.355	.636	1.2	.8	.8	.0	9.3
2013–14	(Greece) KAOD	GBL	25	30.8	.447	.391	.869	2.8	2.1	.8	.0	**17.2**
2014–15	(Kazakhstan) Astana	VTB	29	**33.0**	.403	.373	.864	2.3	3.8	.8	.0	12.0
2014–15	(Kazakhstan) Astana	KBC	11	22.6	.421	.286	.800	1.5	3.3	**1.7**	.0	7.8
2015–16	(Turkey) Türk Telekom	BSL	12	25.7	.442	.377	**.940**	2.2	2.8	.1	.0	15.0
2016	(Greece) AEK Athens	GBL	19	24.7	.342	.333	.815	2.3	2.9	.6	**.1**	9.6
2016–17	(Turkey) Pınar Karşıyaka	BSL	27	29.4	.377	.326	.902	1.7	4.4	.9	.1	11.1
2017–18	(Israel) Gilboa Galil	IPL	**33**	31.6	**.452**	**.425**	.832	**3.2**	**5.9**	1.0	.0	17.0
2018–19	(Israel) Hapoel Jerusalem	IPL	29	21.2	.395	.344	.845	2.3	4.5	.4	.0	10.3

=== European Competitions ===
Year	Team	League	GP	MPG	FG%	3P%	FT%	RPG	APG	SPG	BPG	PPG
2014–15	(Kazakhstan) Astana	EuroChallenge	12	**34.5**	.477	.392	.837	**3.5**	3.7	1.4	.0	**17.8**
2015–16	(Turkey) Türk Telekom	Europe Cup	5	23.6	**.674**	**.688**	.846	2.8	4.4	**1.6**	**.2**	16.0
2016–17	(Turkey) Pınar Karşıyaka	BCL	**19**	30.8	.443	.386	.857	3.1	**5.1**	.9	.0	15.5
2018–19	(Israel) Hapoel Jerusalem	BCL	18	19.8	.379	.371	**.947**	2.2	4.1	.8	.0	8.8

Source: RealGM
