= 2019–20 Israeli Basketball State Cup =

Israeli Basketball State Cup
- Season: 2019–20
- Dates: October 16, 2019 – February 13, 2020
- Games played: 25
- Teams: 26

Finals
- Champions: Hapoel Jerusalem (6th title)
- Runners-up: Ironi Nahariya
- Finals MVP: (United States) J'Covan Brown

The 2019–20 Israeli Basketball State Cup was the 60th edition of the Israeli Basketball State Cup, organized by the Israel Basketball Association.

The Final Four of the tournament was held from February 10–13 in the Menora Mivtachim Arena in Tel Aviv.

On February 13, 2020, Hapoel Jerusalem won its sixth State Cup title after a 92–89 win over Ironi Nahariya in the Final. J'Covan Brown was named the Final MVP.

== First round ==
Hapoel Jerusalem, Maccabi Rishon LeZion, Hapoel Holon, Hapoel Tel Aviv, Maccabi Tel Aviv and Hapoel Be'er Sheva were pre-qualified for the Round of 16 and did not have to play in the first round.

On October 22, 2019, Kevin Capers made an Israeli State Cup-record by scoring 57 points for Hapoel Ramat Gan Givatayim in a 94–104 loss to Hapoel Haifa, passing Tony Dawson’s previous record of 55 points in 1992.

=== H. Hevel Modi'in vs. I. Nes Ziona ===
October 16, 2019	Hapoel Hevel Modi'in	67–97	Ironi Nes Ziona	Ramla
19:30	Scoring by quarter: 11–32, 21–23, 18–23, 17–19
Sport5.co.il	Pts: Aska 20; Rebs: Bier-Katz 10; Asts: Parks 7 PIR: Parks 16	Box Score	Pts: Hollowell & Alber 15; Rebs: Carreira 11; Asts: Limonad 7 PIR: Carreira 21	Arena: Kiriat Menahem Arena; Referees: David Ismarili, David Colangi, Arnon Lavie

=== A.S. Ramat HaSharon vs. E. Yavne ===
October 22, 2019	A.S. Ramat HaSharon	85–93	Elitzur Yavne	Ramat HaSharon
19:05	Scoring by quarter: 21–35, 27–19, 17–14, 20–25
Sport 5	Pts: Nelson 26; Rebs: Jackson 11; Asts: Gilinski & Simin 3 PIR: Jackson 26	Box Score	Pts: Mullings 21; Rebs: Mullings 11; Asts: Three players 4 PIR: Hoffman 25	Arena: Oranim Hall; Attendance: 250; Referees: Eli Meron, Yaron Chechik, Rave Sherf

=== B. Herzliya vs. M. Ra'anana ===
October 22, 2019	Bnei Herzliya	107–70	Maccabi Ra'anana	Herzliya
19:05	Scoring by quarter: 22–21, 27–8, 29–19, 29–22
Sport 5	Pts: Levin 20; Rebs: Donaldson 13; Asts: Leumi 6 PIR: Levin 28	Box Score	Pts: Anderson 17; Rebs: Anderson & Clamage 6 Asts: Three players 3 PIR: Anderson 19	Arena: HaYovel Herzliya; Referees: Adar Pe'er, Shai Meron, Osher Benita

=== M. Kiryat Motzkin vs. H. Galil Elyon ===
October 22, 2019	Maccabi Kiryat Motzkin	73–83	Hapoel Galil Elyon	Kiryat Motzkin
19:10	Scoring by quarter: 22–18, 13–22, 20–24, 18–19
Sport 5	Pts: Stevens 20; Rebs: Stevens 8 Asts: Uzan 6 PIR: Stevens 20	Box Score	Pts: Langston 18; Rebs: O'Brien 6 Asts: Israeli 12; PIR: Langston 23	Arena: Goshen Hall; Referees: Lior Beinish, Dvir Ranish, Dror Galpaz

=== E. Ashkelon vs. H. Gilboa Galil ===
October 22, 2019	Elitzur Eito Ashkelon	68–101	Hapoel Gilboa Galil	Ashkelon
19:10	Scoring by quarter: 18–31, 16–31, 16–28, 18–11
Sport 5	Pts: Delaney 17; Rebs: Lev 8 Asts: Drucker 4 PIR: Lev 15	Box Score	Pts: Tillman 26; Rebs: Flaisher 10; Asts: Gulley 7 PIR: Tillman 31	Arena: Ashkelon Sports Arena; Attendance: 100; Referees: Kfir Mualem, Ziv Radomsky, Tommy Weber

=== M. Hod HaSharon vs. M. Haifa ===
October 22, 2019	Maccabi Hod HaSharon	74–102	Maccabi Haifa	Hod HaSharon
19:15	Scoring by quarter: 27–26, 19–29, 18–26, 10–21
Sport 5	Pts: Rabinowitz 19; Rebs: Three players 5 Asts: Rabinowitz & Paz 3 PIR: Rabinowitz & Amir 19	Box Score	Pts: Suggs 32; Rebs: Sorkin 10; Asts: Cohn 10; PIR: Suggs 36	Arena: Atidim Hall; Attendance: 300; Referees: Nir Meirson, Or Zarur, Ido Ma'aravi

=== H. Ramat Gan Givatayim vs. H. Haifa ===
October 22, 2019	Hapoel Ramat Gan Givatayim	94–104	Hapoel Haifa	Ramat Gan
19:20	Scoring by quarter: 25–15, 22–29, 28–29, 19–31
Sport 5	Pts: Capers 57; Rebs: Solomon 17; Asts: Halamish 6 PIR: Capers 41	Box Score	Pts: Hurtt 29; Rebs: Nesterenko 10; Asts: Buckles 5 PIR: Hurtt & Buckles 31	Arena: Zisman Hall; Referees: Barak Liberman, Assaf Engelberg, Ofir Weistoch

=== E. Netanya vs. I. Nahariya ===
October 23, 2019	Elitzur Netanya	63–70	Ironi Nahariya	Netanya
19:00	Scoring by quarter: 17–25, 12–12, 20–22, 14–11
Sport 5	Pts: Washington 19; Rebs: Naylor 15; Asts: Naylor 5 PIR: Washington 21	Box Score	Pts: Gaffney 16; Rebs: Adrien & Gaffney 9 Asts: Waters 10; PIR: Gaffney 25	Arena: Yeshurun Hall; Attendance: 360; Referees: Pini Rimon, Eran Shmuel, Natalie Galliok

=== I. Kiryat Ata vs. M. Ashdod ===
October 24, 2019	Ironi Kiryat Ata	73–76	Maccabi Ashdod	Kiryat Ata
19:00	Scoring by quarter: 10–22, 19–18, 23–15, 21–21
iBasketball.co.il	Pts: Relphorde 17; Rebs: Thomas 18; Asts: David 4 PIR: Thomas 21	Box Score	Pts: Douglass 19; Rebs: Eliyahu 13; Asts: Eliyahu 7 PIR: Eliyahu 19	Arena: Ramaz Hall; Referees: Zahi Havdali, Nir Keren, Elias Abu Arav

=== H. Afula vs. H. Eilat ===
October 24, 2019	Hapoel Afula	76–103	Hapoel Eilat	Afula
19:00	Scoring by quarter: 15–20, 23–26, 19–31, 19–26
Sport5.co.il	Pts: Drapic 15; Rebs: Rosenberg 6 Asts: Coleman 5 PIR: Drapic 17	Box Score	Pts: Terrell 22; Rebs: Skjöldebrand 7 Asts: Ben-Zvi 10; PIR: Terrell 26	Arena: Nir Ha'emak Hall; Referees: Rotem Kuza, Alex Naftali, Sagi Sade

== Round of 16 ==
=== H. Galil Elyon vs. I. Nahariya ===
November 9, 2019	Hapoel Galil Elyon	68–78	Ironi Nahariya	Kfar Blum
18:00	Scoring by quarter: 18–14, 21–20, 14–21, 15–23
Sport 5+	Pts: Three players 14; Rebs: Langston 9 Asts: Huber & Yerushalmi 4 PIR: Langston 13	Box Score	Pts: Warech 15; Rebs: Gaffney 8 Asts: Waters 6 PIR: Gaffney 18	Arena: Heihal HaPais; Referees: Elad Leibowitz, Lior Beinisch, Rave Sharf

=== H. Eilat vs. M. Tel Aviv ===
November 10, 2019	Hapoel Eilat	76–97	Maccabi Tel Aviv	Eilat
17:55	Scoring by quarter: 17–23, 18–17, 17–23, 24–34
Sport 5	Pts: Skjöldebrand & Menco 17; Rebs: Davenport & Thompson 8 Asts: Ben-Chimol & Terrell 6 PIR: Davenport 19	Box Score	Pts: Hunter 17; Rebs: Hunter 6 Asts: Avdija 7 PIR: Hunter 28	Arena: Begin Arena; Attendance: 1000; Referees: Omer Esteron, Uri Shalhavi, Or Zarur

=== E. Yavne vs. M. Rishon LeZion ===
November 10, 2019	Elitzur Yavne	80–82	Maccabi Rishon LeZion	Yavne
20:10	Scoring by quarter: 26–25, 18–20, 19–21, 17–16
Sport 5	Pts: Mullings 22; Rebs: McShepard 11; Asts: Nissim & Segal 4 PIR: McShepard 20	Box Score	Pts: Monroe & Dovrat 15; Rebs: Swing & Williams 7 Asts: Bourdillon & Dovrat 4 PIR: Blayzer 19	Arena: Ralf Klain Hall; Attendance: 700; Referees: David Romano, Noam Gordon, Ehud Ehrenberg

=== I. Nes Ziona vs. M. Ashdod ===
November 10, 2019	Ironi Nes Ziona	81–69	Maccabi Ashdod	Nes Ziona
20:30	Scoring by quarter: 19–14, 14–13, 26–23, 22–19
Sport 5+	Pts: Withey 23; Rebs: Withey 15; Asts: Limonad 8 PIR: Withey 39	Box Score	Pts: Douglass 18; Rebs: Eliyahu 12; Asts: Eliyahu 8 PIR: Eliyahu 16	Arena: Lev Hamoshava; Referees: Sefi Shemesh, Ofer Mannheim, Adar Peer

=== B. Herzliya vs. M. Haifa ===
November 11, 2019	Bnei Herzliya	80–76	Maccabi Haifa	Herzliya
19:35	Scoring by quarter: 16–21, 20–15, 26–22, 18–18
Sport 5+	Pts: Levin 23; Rebs: Donaldson 12; Asts: Anthony & Leumi 4 PIR: Levin 30	Box Score	Pts: Young 30; Rebs: Vargas 8 Asts: Vargas 10; PIR: Young 21	Arena: HaYovel; Referees: Kfir Mualem, Guy Shmueli, Shai Meron

=== H. Haifa. vs. H. Gilboa Galil ===
November 11, 2019	Hapoel Haifa	69–87	Hapoel Gilboa Galil	Haifa
19:40	Scoring by quarter: 15–17, 21–19, 15–30, 18–21
Sport 5+	Pts: Siggers 14; Rebs: Nesterenko 9 Asts: Tal 4 PIR: Nesterenko 16	Box Score	Pts: Artzi 17; Rebs: Varnado 10; Asts: Ziv 8 PIR: Artzi 25	Arena: Romema Arena; Referees: Dan Yalon, Yoav Luboshitz, Elias Abu Arab

=== H. Be'er Sheva vs. H. Holon ===
November 16, 2019	Hapoel Be'er Sheva	90–103	Hapoel Holon	Be'er Sheva
19:15	Scoring by quarter: 21–31, 27–25, 22–19, 20–28
Sport 5+	Pts: Williams 36; Rebs: Zack 8 Asts: Williams 9 PIR: Williams 39	Box Score	Pts: Foster 29; Rebs: Caupain & Howell 8 Asts: Caupain & Cline 5 PIR: Caupain 29	Arena: Conch Arena; Referees: Gili Cohen, Zahi Havdali, Gil Gordon

=== H. Jerusalem vs. H. Tel Aviv ===
November 17, 2019	Hapoel Jerusalem	85–80	Hapoel Tel Aviv	Jerusalem
21:00	Scoring by quarter: 17–32, 25–14, 23–14, 20–20
Sport 5	Pts: Feldeine 24; Rebs: Thomas & Braimoh 8 Asts: Brown & Feldeine 5 PIR: Feldeine 24	Box Score	Pts: Three players 17; Rebs: Hamilton 9 Asts: Lyons 7 PIR: Smith 21	Arena: Pais Arena; Referees: Amit Balack, Dan Yalon, Rotem Kuza

== Quarterfinals ==
=== H. Holon vs. I. Nahariya ===
November 23, 2019	Hapoel Holon	67–90	Ironi Nahariya	Holon
20:30	Scoring by quarter: 14–20, 14–20, 20–30, 19–20
Sport 5	Pts: Foster 14; Rebs: Caupain 8 Asts: Caupain 10; PIR: Caupain 19	Box Score	Pts: Waters 18; Rebs: Adrien 8 Asts: Waters 6 PIR: Waters 26	Arena: Holon Toto Hall; Referees: Amit Balak, Kfir Mualem, Dan Yalon

=== I. Nes Ziona vs. H. Gilboa Galil ===
November 24, 2019	Ironi Nes Ziona	97–86	Hapoel Gilboa Galil	Nes Ziona
19:00	Scoring by quarter: 33–22, 25–29, 21–18, 18–17
Sport 5	Pts: Withey 20; Rebs: Withey 17; Asts: Limonad 8 PIR: Withey 33	Box Score	Pts: Sosa 21; Rebs: Tillman & Sosa 6 Asts: Ziv 6 PIR: Varnado 21	Arena: Lev Hamoshava; Referees: Sefi Shemesh, Lior Beinish, Gil Gordon

=== B. Herzliya vs. M. Rishon LeZion ===
November 24, 2019	Bnei Herzliya	85–86	Maccabi Rishon LeZion	Herzliya
19:45	Scoring by quarter: 24–25, 15–24, 26–18, 19–18
Sport 5	Pts: Anthony 23; Rebs: Eisendorf 9 Asts: Anthony 8 PIR: Anthony 26	Box Score	Pts: Hamilton 21; Rebs: Williams 12; Asts: Hamilton 7 PIR: Blayzer 22	Arena: HaYovel; Referees: Ofer Manheim, Ori Shalhavi, Noam Gordon

=== M. Tel Aviv vs. H. Jerusalem ===
November 25, 2019	Maccabi Tel Aviv	90–92	Hapoel Jerusalem	Tel Aviv
21:00	Scoring by quarter: 24–22, 19–27, 23–15, 24–28
Sport 5	Pts: Wilbekin 22; Rebs: Hunter 11; Asts: Wilbekin 6 PIR: Hunter 22	Box Score	Pts: Lockett & Brown 19; Rebs: Thomas 8 Asts: Blatt 8 PIR: Thomas 27	Arena: Menora Mivtachim Arena; Referees: Omer Esteron, Erez Gurion, David Romano

== Final Four ==
=== Bracket ===
Semifinals; February 10, 2020
Maccabi Rishon LeZion	78
Hapoel Jerusalem	90
Ironi Nes Ziona	86
Ironi Nahariya	91

Final; February 13, 2020
Hapoel Jerusalem	92
Ironi Nahariya	89

=== Semifinals ===
February 10, 2020	Ironi Nes Ziona	86–91	Ironi Nahariya	Tel Aviv
18:30	Scoring by quarter: 19–27, 22–20, 13–22, 32–22
Sport 5	Pts: Cook 35; Rebs: Three players 6 Asts: Fisher 8 PIR: Cook 33	Box Score	Pts: Waters 28; Rebs: Simpson 9 Asts: Waters 6 PIR: Waters 28	Arena: Menora Mivtachim Arena; Referees: Amit Ballak, Erez Gurion, Lior Beinish

Starters:			Pts	Reb	Ast
G	10	(United States) Corey Fisher	15	1	8
G	28	(Israel) Raviv Limonad	2	2	0
G/F	31	(United States) Daequan Cook	35	3	4
F	6	(Israel) Tal Dunne	8	6	6
C	5	(United States) Jeff Withey	8	6	1
Reserves:					
F	2	(United States) JP Tokoto	11	6	2
G	14	(Israel) Golan Gutt	5	1	2
F/C	7	(Israel) Raviv Pitshon	2	2	0
G	24	(Israel) Eidan Alber	0	0	0
G	17	(Israel) Tomer Abramovitch	DNP		
G	21	(Israel) Tamir Saban	DNP		
F	88	(Israel) Ofir Goldsztejn	DNP		
Head coach:
(Israel) Nadav Zilberstein

I. Nes Ziona	I. Nahariya

Nes Ziona	Statistics	Nahariya
19/39 (48%)	2 point field goals	18/34 (52%)
11/25 (44%)	3 point field goals	11/23 (47%)
15/23 (65%)	Free throws	22/31 (70%)
31	Rebounds	34
23	Assists	18
9	Steals	7
14	Turnovers	14
4	Blocks	4

Starters:			Pts	Reb	Ast
G	7	(United States) Dominic Waters	28	4	6
G	22	(United States) Jerel McNeal	12	3	4
G/F	77	(Israel) Egor Koulechov	12	4	1
F/C	13	(United States) Tony Gaffney	10	4	0
C	9	(Israel) Itay Segev	6	7	1
Reserves:					
C	3	(United States) Diamon Simpson	14	9	3
G	8	(Israel) Niv Misgav	5	0	1
G	11	(Israel) Eyal Shulman	4	0	2
G	15	(Israel) Shalev Logashi	DNP		
F	20	(Israel) Noam Akrish	DNP		
G	21	(Israel) Travis Warech	DNP		
G	23	(Israel) Tomer Cohen	DNP		
Head coach:
(Israel) Danny Franco

February 10, 2020	Maccabi Rishon LeZion	78–90	Hapoel Jerusalem	Tel Aviv
21:00	Scoring by quarter: 19–31, 21–17, 20–27, 18–15
Sport 5	Pts: Monroe 27; Rebs: Kelly 10; Asts: Ariel & Bourdillon 4 PIR: Monroe 30	Box Score	Pts: Holland 15; Rebs: Thomas 9 Asts: Blatt 6 PIR: Feldeine 20	Arena: Menora Mivtachim Arena; Referees: Sefi Shemesh, Nir Meirson, Zahi Havdali

Starters:			Pts	Reb	Ast
G	42	(United States) Alex Hamilton	15	3	3
G	8	(Israel) Frédéric Bourdillon	0	1	4
F	7	(United States) Jordan Swing	0	3	1
F/C	86	(United States) Darryl Monroe	27	6	2
C	24	(United States) James Kelly	7	10	1
Reserves:					
F	14	(Israel) Oz Blayzer	13	3	0
G	11	(Israel) Adam Ariel	9	5	4
G	41	(Israel) Noam Dovrat	5	1	1
G	30	(Israel) Nimrod Tishman	2	0	0
F	1	(Israel) Liad Mishan	DNP		
G	9	(Israel) Tal Peled	DNP		
C	25	(Israel) Niv Baloul	DNP		
Head coach:
(Israel) Guy Goodes

M. Rishon LeZion	H. Jerusalem

Rishon LeZion	Statistics	Jerusalem
17/39 (43%)	2 point field goals	23/37 (62%)
5/20 (25%)	3 point field goals	12/36 (33%)
29/33 (87%)	Free throws	8/11 (72%)
37	Rebounds	40
16	Assists	23
11	Steals	11
17	Turnovers	16
1	Blocks	2

Starters:			Pts	Reb	Ast
G	6	(Israel) Tamir Blatt	11	2	6
G	14	(Dominican Republic) James Feldeine	14	6	5
F	23	(Puerto Rico) John Holland	15	4	4
F/C	35	(United States) TaShawn Thomas	14	9	4
C	20	(Israel) Idan Zalmanson	8	6	2
Reserves:					
G	69	(United States) J'Covan Brown	11	2	1
F/C	17	(Nigeria) Suleiman Braimoh	8	2	1
F	15	(Israel) Nimrod Levi	7	5	0
G	11	(Israel) Bar Timor	2	2	2
G	5	(Israel) Daniel Rosenbaum	0	0	0
G	3	(Israel) Chris Smith	DNP		
G	22	(Israel) Dvir Ringvald	DNP		
Head coach:
(Israel) Oded Kattash

=== Final ===
February 13, 2020	Hapoel Jerusalem	92–89	Ironi Nahariya	Tel Aviv
	Scoring by quarter: 25–22, 20–21, 22–26, 21–24
Sport 5	Pts: Brown 26; Rebs: Thomas 13; Asts: Brown 5 PIR: Brown 27	Box Score	Pts: Waters 26; Rebs: Segev 9 Asts: McNeal 7 PIR: Waters 25	Arena: Menora Mivtachim Arena; Referees: Omer Esteron, David Romano, Elad Leibovich

Starters:			Pts	Reb	Ast
G	6	(Israel) Tamir Blatt	5	0	5
G	14	(Dominican Republic) James Feldeine	12	5	1
F	23	(Puerto Rico) John Holland	7	3	1
F/C	35	(United States) TaShawn Thomas	11	13	0
C	17	(Nigeria) Suleiman Braimoh	9	7	3
Reserves:					
G	69	(United States) J'Covan Brown	26	6	5
F	15	(Israel) Nimrod Levi	6	1	1
G	11	(Israel) Bar Timor	3	0	1
C	20	(Israel) Idan Zalmanson	2	3	0
G	3	(Israel) Chris Smith	DNP		
G	5	(Israel) Daniel Rosenbaum	DNP		
G	22	(Israel) Dvir Ringvald	DNP		
Head coach:
(Israel) Oded Kattash

H. Jerusalem	I. Nahariya

Jerusalem	Statistics	Nahariya
17/35 (48%)	2 point field goals	19/43 (44%)
16/36 (44%)	3 point field goals	14/23 (60%)
10/18 (55%)	Free throws	9/15 (60%)
39	Rebounds	39
17	Assists	16
10	Steals	6
12	Turnovers	14
4	Blocks	2

Starters:			Pts	Reb	Ast
G	7	(United States) Dominic Waters	26	2	7
G	22	(United States) Jerel McNeal	20	6	7
G/F	77	(Israel) Egor Koulechov	14	8	0
F/C	13	(United States) Tony Gaffney	11	5	2
C	9	(Israel) Itay Segev	15	9	0
Reserves:					
C	3	(United States) Diamon Simpson	3	2	0
G	8	(Israel) Niv Misgav	0	1	0
G	11	(Israel) Eyal Shulman	0	0	0
G	15	(Israel) Shalev Logashi	DNP		
F	20	(Israel) Noam Akrish	DNP		
G	21	(Israel) Travis Warech	DNP		
G	23	(Israel) Tomer Cohen	DNP		
Head coach:
(Israel) Danny Franco

2020 Israeli State Cup Winners
Hapoel Jerusalem
(6th title)

== See also ==
- 2019–20 Israeli Basketball Premier League
