= Chris Smith (basketball, born 1987) =

American-Israeli basketball player (born 1987)

Chris Smith 'כריס סמית
Personal information
- Born: October 13, 1987 (age 39) Millstone Township, New Jersey, U.S.
- Listed height: 6 ft 2 in (1.88 m)
- Listed weight: 205 lb (93 kg)

Career information
- High school: Lakewood (Lakewood, New Jersey); St. Benedict's (Newark, New Jersey)
- College: Manhattan (2007–2009); Louisville (2010–2012)
- NBA draft: 2012: undrafted
- Playing career: 2012–2023
- Position: Point guard / shooting guard

Career history
- 2013: New York Knicks
- 2013: →Erie BayHawks
- 2014: Erie BayHawks
- 2015: KB Peja
- 2016: Saint John Mill Rats
- 2016: Hapoel Galil Elyon
- 2017–2018: Ironi Nahariya
- 2018: Maccabi Kiryat Motzkin
- 2019–2020: Hapoel Jerusalem
- 2020: Hapoel Acre/Mateh Asher
- 2021–2023: Maccabi Haifa

Career highlights
- Israeli State Cup winner (2020)
- Stats at NBA.com
- Stats at Basketball Reference

Jamahl Christopher Smith (Hebrew: 'כריס סמית; born October 13, 1987) is an American-Israeli former professional basketball player. He played college basketball for the Manhattan Jaspers and Louisville Cardinals.

== High school career ==
Smith averaged 18.8 points, 5.3 rebounds, 4.9 assists and 2.8 steals in his final prep season at St. Benedict's Prep. Chris was honored on the first team All-Freelance League team as a senior. Before playing at St. Benedict's, he played at Lakewood High School for three years, scoring over 1,300 career points. At Lakewood High School, he also played wide receiver and kicker for the football team.

== College career ==
As a freshman and sophomore, Chris Smith played for the Manhattan Jaspers. He wore the number 2. During his freshman year (2007–2008), Smith averaged 9.9 points per game, 1 assists per game, and shot 40.4 percent from the field. Smith also shot 28.1 percent from three. The Jaspers went 12–19, that year. During his sophomore year (2008–2009), Smith averaged 13.4 ppg, 1.2 apg, shot 36.2% from the field, and 28.8% from three-point range. The Jaspers finished off the season over .500 at a 16–14 record. Smith transferred to Louisville to complete his college career.

After transferring from Manhattan, Smith played for the Louisville Cardinals during his junior and senior year in college. Smith wore number 5. During his junior year (2010–2011), Smith averaged 9.4 ppg, 2.5 apg, shot 45.8% from the field, and 40.4% from three-point range. This was an improvement in 3-point shooting from his lower class years at Manhattan. The Cardinals finished the season with a 25–10 record. As a senior, Smith averaged 9.7 points, 3.6 rebounds, and 1.9 assists.

== Professional career ==
After going undrafted in the 2012 NBA draft, Smith joined the New York Knicks' Summer League team. He signed with the Knicks on August 1, 2012, but was waived on October 26. He did not appear in any preseason games after undergoing left patella tendon surgery. Smith re-joined the Knicks for the 2013 NBA Summer League and was later signed by the Knicks on September 11, 2013. On November 18, he was assigned to the Erie BayHawks of the NBA Development League. On December 17, he was recalled by New York. After appearing in two games as a Knick, he was waived by the team on December 31. After being waived by the Knicks, he was acquired by the BayHawks on January 7. He was later released by the BayHawks on March 4.

On February 4, 2015, Smith signed with KB Peja of the Kosovo Basketball Superleague. The next month, he left Peja.

In February 2016, Smith signed with the Saint John Mill Rats of the National Basketball League of Canada for the rest of the 2015–16 season.

On October 6, 2016, Smith signed with Israeli club Hapoel Galil Elyon of the Liga Leumit. However, he was waived on October 13, after appearing in only one game.

On December 15, 2017, Smith signed a three-year deal with Israeli club Ironi Nahariya. On January 18, 2018, Smith parted ways with Nahariya after appearing in two Israeli League games. One day later, he signed with Maccabi Kiryat Motzkin of the Israeli National League for the rest of the season. On February 5, 2018, Smith parted ways with Kiryat Motzkin after appearing in one game.

On December 23, 2019, Smith signed with Hapoel Jerusalem for the rest of the season.

== Personal life ==
Smith is son of Ida and Earl Smith, and has three brothers and two sisters. He is the younger brother of former NBA player J. R. Smith.

In 2017, Smith converted to Judaism and became an Israeli citizen.

== Career statistics ==
Legend
GP	Games played	GS	Games started	MPG	Minutes per game
FG%	Field goal percentage	3P%	3-point field goal percentage	FT%	Free throw percentage
RPG	Rebounds per game	APG	Assists per game	SPG	Steals per game
BPG	Blocks per game	PPG	Points per game	**Bold**	Career high

=== NBA ===
==== Regular season ====
Year	Team	GP	GS	MPG	FG%	3P%	FT%	RPG	APG	SPG	BPG	PPG
2013–14	New York	2	0	1.0	–	–	–	.0	.0	.0	.0	.0
