= 2015–16 Greek Basket League =

Sports season

- Season: 2015–16
- Duration: 10 October 2015 – 13 April 2016 (regular season); 16 April – 30 May (playoffs)
- Games played: 182 (regular season); 25 (playoffs)
- Teams: 14
- TV partners: OTE Sport; Nova Sports

Regular season
- Season MVP: (Greece) Vassilis Spanoulis
- Relegated: Arkadikos; Kavala

Finals
- Champions: Olympiacos (12th title)
- Runners-up: Panathinaikos
- Semi-finalists: AEK; Aris
- Finals MVP: (Greece) Vassilis Spanoulis

Statistical leaders
Points	(Greece) Loukas Mavrokefalidis	377
Rebounds	(United States) Dustin Hogue	216
Assists	(Greece) Nick Calathes	163
Index Rating	(United States) Okaro White	474

Records
- Biggest home win: Olympiacos 115–61 Kavala (29 February 2016)
- Biggest away win: Lavrio 39–108 Olympiacos (8 November 2015)
- Highest scoring: Nea Kifissia 103–108 Aris (23 April 2016)
- Winning streak: 29 games Olympiacos
- Losing streak: 10 games Kavala
- All statistics correct as of 30 May 2016.

The 2015–16 Basket League season was the 24th season of the top-tier Greek professional basketball league, since its establishment in 1992, and the 76th season of top-flight Greek basketball overall.

== Teams ==
=== Promotion and relegation ===
- Panionios, Panelefsiniakos, and KAOD were relegated after the 2014–15 Greek Basket League.
- Kavala, Arkadikos, and Lavrio were promoted from the A2 League.
2015–16 Greek Basket League season club locations.

=== Locations and arenas ===
Club	Ap.	City	Arena	Capacity
AEK	59	Marousi, Athens	OAKA Indoor Hall	19,250
Apollon Patras	31	Patras	Apollon Patras Indoor Hall	3,500
Aris	62	Thessaloniki	Alexandrio Melathron	5,138
Arkadikos	1	Tripoli	Tripoli Indoor Hall	1,100
Kolossos Rodou	10	Rhodes	Venetoklio Indoor Hall	1,242
Koroivos	2	Koroivos	Amaliada Indoor Hall	2,000
Lavrio	1	Lavrio	Lavrio Indoor Hall	1,700
Nea Kifissia	3	Kifissia, Athens	Zirineio Indoor Hall	1,500
Olympiacos	63	Piraeus, Athens	Peace and Friendship Stadium	12,000
Panathinaikos	66	Marousi, Athens	OAKA Indoor Hall	19,250
PAOK	59	Pylaia, Thessaloniki	PAOK Sports Arena	8,500
Rethymno Cretan Kings	6	Rethymno	Rethymno Indoor Hall	1,600
Trikala Aries	3	Trikala	Trikala Indoor Hall	2,500
Kavala	6	Kavala	Kalamitsa Indoor Hall	1,650

=== Personnel and kits ===
Team	Head coach	Team captain	Kit manufacturer	Shirt sponsor
AEK	(Slovenia) Jure Zdovc	(Greece) Dušan Šakota	Fila	OPAP
Apollon Patras	(Greece) Kostas Mexas	(Greece) Nikos Argyropoulos	ASICS	Loux
Aris	(Greece) Dimitris Priftis	(Greece) Spyros Mourtos	NG6	
Arkadikos	(Greece) Ioannis Kastritis	(Greece) Giorgos Kopsaftis	Macron	
Union Kavala	(Greece) Steve Giatzoglou	(Greece) Dimitris Kalaitzidis	Nickan	
Kolossos Rodou	(Greece) Aris Lykogiannis	(Greece) Ioannis Georgalis	Fila	Aegean Airlines
Koroivos	(Greece) Charis Markopoulos	(Greece) Panagiotis Vasilopoulos	Nickan	
Lavrio	(Greece) Christos Serelis	(Greece) Sakis Giannakopoulos	Nickan	
Nea Kifissia	(Greece) Ilias Papatheodorou	(Greece) Nikos Gkikas	Nickan	
Olympiacos	(Greece) Ioannis Sfairopoulos	(Greece) Vassilis Spanoulis	Nike	OPAP
Panathinaikos	(Greece) Argyris Pedoulakis	(Greece) Dimitris Diamantidis	Adidas	Stoiximan.gr
PAOK	(Greece) Soulis Markopoulos	(Greece) Kostas Charalampidis	Luanvi	
Rethymno Cretan Kings	(Greece) Thanasis Skourtopoulos	(Greece) Stavros Schizas	Nickan	OPAP
Trikala Aries	(Greece) Kostas Flevarakis	(Greece) Georgios Tsiaras	CAP	Olympos

=== European competitions ===
Team	Competition	Result
Panathinaikos	Euroleague	Top 8
Olympiacos	Euroleague	Top 16
Aris	Eurocup	Last 32
PAOK	Eurocup	Last 32
AEK	Eurocup	Regular Season

== Regular season ==
=== League table ===
Pos	Team	Pld	W	L	PF	PA	PD	Pts	Qualification or relegation
1	Olympiacos	26	25	1	2235	1688	+547	51	Qualification to Playoffs
2	Panathinaikos	26	25	1	2135	1770	+365	51	Qualification to Playoffs
3	Aris	26	20	6	2010	1761	+249	46	Qualification to Playoffs
4	AEK	26	18	8	2010	1834	+176	44	Qualification to Playoffs
5	PAOK	26	13	13	1956	1924	+32	39	Qualification to Playoffs
6	Nea Kifissia	26	12	14	1964	1998	−34	38	Qualification to Playoffs
7	Kolossos H Hotels	26	11	15	1918	1990	−72	37	Qualification to Playoffs
8	Rethymno Cretan Kings	26	10	16	1953	2098	−145	36	Qualification to Playoffs
9	Trikala Aries	26	9	17	1938	2061	−123	35	
10	Apollon Patras Carna	26	9	17	1797	1952	−155	35	
11	Lavrio	26	9	17	1895	2027	−132	35	
12	Koroivos	26	8	18	1809	1991	−182	34	
13	Arkadikos	26	8	18	1785	2032	−247	34	Relegated to Greek A2 Basket League
14	Kavala	26	5	21	1830	2109	−279	31	Relegated to Greek A2 Basket League

Source: ESAKE

=== Results ===
Home \ Away	AEK	APO	ARIS	ARK	KAV	KOL	KOR	LAV	NEA	OLY	PAO	PAOK	RET	TRI
AEK		84–78	74–83	87–74	80–72	92–57	70–49	90–82	76–73	93–100	64–67	65–53	86–70	82–65
Apollon Patras	63–82		65–73	56–76	66–59	58–74	60–62	90–73	73–66	72–77	80–90	69–68	75–57	83–77
Aris	77–76	82–50		86–52	68–50	83–68	99–56	82–68	81–68	70–74	70–76	84–72	72–60	84–79
Arkadikos	74–78	82–59	50–90		74–68	77–67	88–89	98–90	64–78	60–103	61–78	66–68	75–70	79–66
Kavala	55–65	72–91	71–77	85–74		72–85	74–89	68–66	72–77	57–71	76–82	74–87	103–102	90–72
Kolossos Rodou	85–86	60–54	76–70	83–70	98–79		94–73	61–72	87–90	53–73	64–77	74–56	80–67	79–69
Koroivos	67–76	58–59	67–65	60–61	72–78	68–71		86–69	87–77	65–84	57–75	65–75	83–79	64–73
Lavrio	65–70	80–64	68–76	79–67	99–63	84–73	81–72		74–70	55–71	72–79	62–78	69–67	75–80
Nea Kifissia	54–78	79–82	65–67	68–66	83–79	77–69	60–61	83–80		73–75	75–84	97–92	100–88	115–79
Olympiacos	79–71	83–62	76–64	89–44	115–61	88–62	83–64	108–39	97–59		80–66	83–76	95–59	84–52
Panathinaikos	78–71	87–81	80–59	90–69	88–54	107–66	88–76	94–56	73–67	73–69		70–69	84–62	77–64
PAOK	79–75	80–67	69–77	74–54	71–60	64–59	92–78	69–75	67–73	99–104	67–90		87–94	82–67
Rethymno Cretan Kings	70–69	87–73	83–88	89–76	84–74	95–87	75–67	87–85	74–61	70–85	60–84	63–74		83–79
Trikala Aries	65–70	84–67	68–83	82–54	73–64	89–86	85–74	81–77	73–76	69–89	81–98	79–88	87–58	

Legend: Blue = home team win; Yellow = draw; Red = away team win.

== Playoffs ==
=== Bracket ===
Teams in bold won the playoff series. Numbers to the left of each team indicate the team's original playoff seeding. Numbers to the right indicate the score of each playoff game.

Quarter-finals
1	**Olympiacos**	**2**
8	Rethymno Cretan Kings	0
4	**AEK**	**2**
5	PAOK	1
2	**Panathinaikos**	**2**
7	Kolossos Rodou	0
3	**Aris**	**2**
6	Nea Kifissia	0

Semi-finals
1	**Olympiacos**	**3**
4	AEK	0
2	**Panathinaikos**	**3**
3	Aris	2

Finals
1	**Olympiacos**	**3**
2	Panathinaikos	1
Third place
3	Aris	1
4	**AEK**	**3**

=== Quarter-finals ===
In the quarterfinals, teams playing against each other had to win two games to win the series. Thus, if one team wins two games before all three games have been played, the games that remain are omitted. The team that finished in the higher regular season place, played the first and the third (if it was necessary) games of the series at home.

Team 1	Agg.	Team 2	Game 1	Game 2	Game 3
**Olympiacos**	2–0	Rethymno Cretan Kings	102–71	77–73	—
**AEK**	2–1	PAOK	78–83	68–59	61–54
**Panathinaikos**	2–0	Kolossos Rodou	91–63	80–71	—
**Aris**	2–0	Nea Kifissia	78–60	108–103	—

=== Semi-finals ===
In the semi-finals, teams playing against each other had to win three games to win the series. Thus, if one team won three games before all five games had been played, the games that remained were omitted. The team that finished in the higher regular season place played the first, the second, and the fifth (if it was necessary) games of the series at home.

Team 1	Agg.	Team 2	Game 1	Game 2	Game 3	Game 4	Game 5
**Olympiacos**	3–0	AEK	93–58	80–67	89–75	—	—
**Panathinaikos**	3–2	Aris	85–79	74–60	68–77	50–56	84–68

=== Third place ===
In the series for the third place, teams playing against each other had to win three games to win the 3rd place in the final rankings of the season. Thus, if one team won three games before all five games had been played, the remaining games were omitted. The team that finished in the higher regular season place, played the first, the third, and the fifth (if it was necessary) games of the series at home.

Team 1	Agg.	Team 2	Game 1	Game 2	Game 3	Game 4	Game 5
Aris	1–3	**AEK**	67–77	84–89	74–69	81–89	—

=== Finals ===
In the finals, teams playing against each other had to win three games to win the title. Thus, if one team won three games before all five games were played, the remaining games were omitted. The team that finished in the higher regular season place, played the first, the third, and the fifth (if it was necessary) games of the series at home.

Team 1	Agg.	Team 2	Game 1	Game 2	Game 3	Game 4	Game 5
**Olympiacos**	3–1	Panathinaikos	81–83	68–66	77–72	82–81	—

== Finals ==
=== Game 1 ===
19 May 2016	Olympiacos	81–83	Panathinaikos	Piraeus
19:30 (EET)	Scoring by quarter: 15–24, 26–23, 21–14, 19–22
	Pts: Lojeski 21, Printezis 17, Spanoulis 15; Rebs: Hunter 6 Asts: Hackett 7 PIR: Lojeski 26	Report	Pts: Calathes 16; Rebs: Calathes 8 Asts: Calathes 8 PIR: Calathes 27	Arena: Peace and Friendship Stadium; Referees: Christos Christodoulou, Chrysostomos Schinas, Kostas Mitsopoulos

=== Game 2 ===
22 May 2016	Panathinaikos	66–68	Olympiacos	Athens
19:30 (EET)	Scoring by quarter: 14–11, 17–21, 15–18, 20–18
	Pts: Pappas 12; Rebs: Calathes 7 Asts: Calathes 6 PIR: Pappas 16	Report	Pts: Printezis 20, Spanoulis 11; Rebs: Printezis 9, Asts: Lojeski 5 PIR: Printezis 24	Arena: O.A.C.A. Referees: Antonis Anastopoulos, Elias Koromilas, Anastasios Manos

=== Game 3 ===
26 May 2016	Olympiacos	77–72	Panathinaikos	Piraeus
19:30 (EET)	Scoring by quarter: 17–21, 24–23, 16–18, 20–10
	Pts: Spanoulis 22; Rebs: Printezis 7 Asts: Hackett 3 PIR: Hackett 16	Report	Pts: Feldeine 17; Rebs: Calathes, Fotsis, Papagiannis 5 Asts: Calathes, Diamantidis, Feldeine 3 PIR: Calathes, Diamantidis 14	Arena: Peace and Friendship Stadium; Referees: Anastasios Piloidis, Charalampos Karakatsounis, Christos Panagiotou

=== Game 4 ===
30 May 2016	Panathinaikos	81–82(OT)	Olympiacos	Athens
19:30 (EET)	Scoring by quarter: 16–19, 19–12, 15–21, 13–11, Overtime: 18–19
	Pts: Pappas 16; Rebs: Pappas 9 Asts: Diamantidis 6 PIR: Diamantidis 24	Report	Pts: Spanoulis 25, Hunter 14, Mantzaris, Papanikolaou 13; Rebs: Agravanis 9, Hunter 7 Asts: Spanoulis 6 PIR: Agravanis, Hunter 18	Arena: O.A.C.A. Referees: Christos Christodoulou, Chrysostomos Schinas, Kostas Mitsopoulos

== Final standings ==
Pos	Team	Games	Wins	Losses	Qualification or Relegation
1	Olympiacos	35	33	2	Qualification to the EuroLeague; *Club qualified for EuroLeague by having a contract
2	Panathinaikos	37	31	6	Qualification to the EuroLeague; *Club qualified for EuroLeague by having a contract
3	AEK	36	23	13	Qualification to the Champions League; *AEK, Aris and PAOK declined EuroCup participation.
4	Aris	37	25	12	Qualification to the Champions League; *AEK, Aris and PAOK declined EuroCup participation.
5	PAOK	29	14	15	Qualification to the Champions League; *AEK, Aris and PAOK declined EuroCup participation.
6	Nea Kifissia	28	12	16	Qualification to the Champions League qualifying rounds *Nea Kifissia declined Champions League participation. *Relegated down to Greek B League, due to financial problems.
7	Kolossos Rodou	28	11	17	
8	Rethymno Cretan Kings	28	10	18	
9	Trikala Aries	26	9	17	
10	Apollon Patras	26	9	17	
11	Lavrio	26	9	17	
12	Koroivos	26	8	18	
13	Arkadikos	26	8	18	Relegation to the Greek A2 League
14	Kavala	26	5	21	Relegation to the Greek A2 League

== Awards ==
=== Greek League MVP ===
- (Greece) Vassilis Spanoulis – Olympiacos

=== Greek League Finals MVP ===
- (Greece) Vassilis Spanoulis – Olympiacos

=== All-Greek League Team ===
- (Greece) Dimitris Diamantidis – Panathinaikos
- (Greece) Vassilis Spanoulis – Olympiacos
- (United States) Okaro White – Aris
- (Greece) Giorgos Printezis – Olympiacos
- (Greece) Loukas Mavrokefalidis – AEK

=== Best Coach ===
- (Greece) Dimitris Priftis – Aris

=== Defensive Player of the Year ===
- (Greece) Nick Calathes – Panathinaikos

=== Best Young Player ===
- (Greece) Ioannis Papapetrou – Olympiacos

=== Most Improved Player ===
- (Greece) Leonidas Kaselakis – Nea Kifissia

=== Most Popular Player ===
- (Greece) Dimitris Diamantidis – Panathinaikos

=== Most Spectacular Player ===
- (United States) Okaro White – Aris

== Statistical leaders ==
Greek Basket League stats leaders are counted by totals, rather than averages, and include both regular season.

=== Performance Index Rating ===
Pos.	Player	Club	PIR
1.	(United States) Okaro White	Aris	474
2.	(Greece) Loukas Mavrokefalidis	AEK	436
3.	(United States) Dustin Hogue	Nea Kifissia	411
4.	(United States) Trevor Releford	Kolossos Rodou	401
5.	(United Kingdom) Ovie Soko	Trikala	399

=== Points ===
Pos.	Player	Club	Total points
1.	(Greece) Loukas Mavrokefalidis	AEK	377
2.	(United States) Dwayne Davis	Koroivos	366
3.	(United States) Trevor Releford	Kolossos Rodou	361
4.	(United States) Jerel McNeal	Aris	351
5.	(United States) Okaro White	Aris	349

=== Rebounds ===
Pos.	Player	Club	Total Rebounds
1.	(United States) Dustin Hogue	Nea Kifissia	216
2.	(United States) Okaro White	Aris	182
3.	(Greece) Loukas Mavrokefalidis	AEK	176
4.	(United States) Ousman Krubally	Lavrio	173
5.	(United States) Darrell Harris	Koroivos	161

=== Assists ===
Pos	Player	Club	Total Assists
1.	(Greece) Nick Calathes	Panathinaikos	163
2.	(Greece) Vassilis Spanoulis	Olympiacos	121
3.	(Greece) Nikos Gkikas	Nea Kifissia	106
4.	(United States) Trevor Releford	Kolossos Rodou	105
5.	(United States) Will Hatcher	PAOK	103

== Clubs in international competitions ==
Team	Competition	Result
Panathinaikos	EuroLeague	Playoffs, Quarterfinals
Olympiacos	EuroLeague	Top-16, 7th place
Aris	EuroCup	Last 32, 3rd place
PAOK	EuroCup	Last 32, 4th place
AEK	EuroCup	Regular season, 5th place

== See also ==
- 2015–16 Greek Basketball Cup
- 2015–16 Greek A2 Basket League (2nd tier)
