= Dimitrios Mavroeidis =

Greek basketball player (born 1985)

Dimitris Mavroeidis
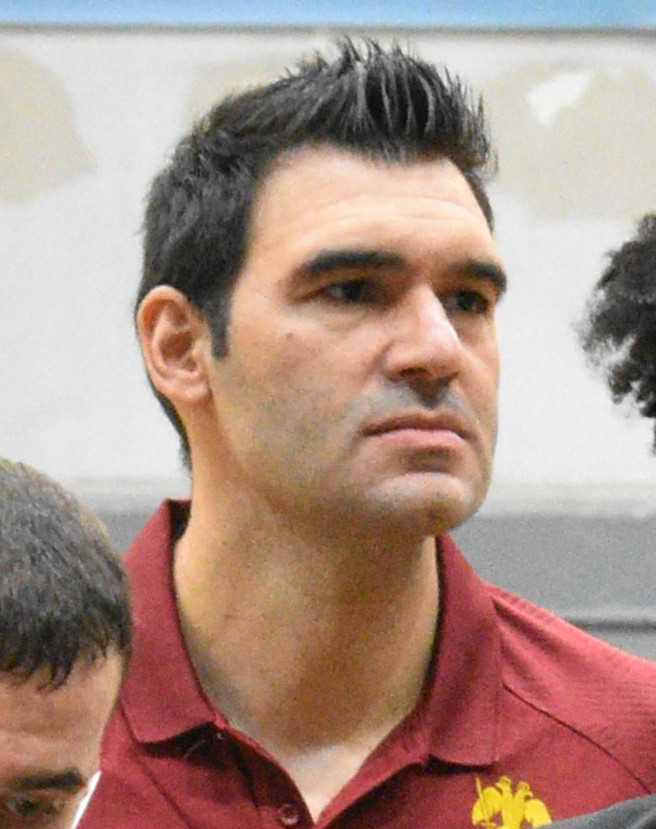
- Mavroeidis in 2023

AEK Athens
- Title: Team manager
- League: Greek Basket League; BCL

Personal information
- Born: July 4, 1985 (age 41) Maroussi, Athens, Greece
- Listed height: 6 ft 11.5 in (2.12 m)
- Listed weight: 265 lb (120 kg)

Career information
- NBA draft: 2005: undrafted
- Playing career: 2002–2023
- Position: Center
- Number: 11, 12, 22

Career history
- 2002–2005: Peristeri
- 2005–2007: Panionios
- 2007–2010: Maroussi
- 2010–2012: Bilbao
- 2012–2013: Olympiacos
- 2014–2015: Nea Kifissia
- 2015–2018: AEK Athens
- 2018–2019: Kolossos Rodou
- 2019–2023: AEK Athens

Career highlights
- EuroLeague champion (2013); FIBA Champions League champion (2018); 2× Greek Cup winner (2018, 2020)
Medals
Men's basketball
Representing Greece
FIBA U-21 World Cup
Silver medal – second place	2005 Mar del Plata	Under-21
Mediterranean Games
Silver medal – second place	2009 Pescara	Under-26

Dimitrios Mavroeidis (alternate spellings: Dimitris, Mavroidis) (Greek: Δημήτρης Μαυροειδής; born July 4, 1985) is a Greek former professional basketball player and currently the team manager for AEK Athens of the Greek Basket League and the Basketball Champions League. During his career as a player, he stood at 2.12 m (6 ft 11 1/2 in) tall and covered the center position.

== Professional career ==
Mavroeidis began his professional career with the Greek League club Peristeri in 2002. He moved to Panionios in 2005. He signed with Maroussi in 2007. In 2010, he joined the Spanish ACB League club Bilbao Basket.

In 2012, he joined the EuroLeague club Olympiacos. With Olympiacos, he won the 2012–13 championship of the EuroLeague.

He moved to Nea Kifissia in 2014. During the first round of the 2014–15 Greek Basket League, he was voted as the MVP of the week's first round of the Greek Basket League.

On November 9, 2015, Mavroeidis signed with AEK Athens, until the end of the season. On November 11, Mavroeidis made his debut with AEK against Neptūnas in the EuroCup, scoring 4 points, and grabbing 3 rebounds, in his team's 80–86 win. After the departure of Loukas Mavrokefalidis from AEK on August 27, 2016, the team renewed Mavroeidis' contract for one more season.

On August 9, 2017, AEK re-signed Mavroeidis for his third season with the club. With AEK, he won the 2018 Final of the Greek Cup and the FIBA 2017–18 Basketball Champions League.

Mavroeidis spent the 2018-19 campaign with Kolossos Rodou, before returning once more to AEK to finish out his career.

He started out the 2021–22 season in an ancillary role, before stepping up after a series of injuries for the team, as well as the death of Stevan Jelovac. In 21 league games, he averaged 5.9 points and 4.4 rebounds, playing around 15 minutes per contest. During the 2022–2023 season, Mavroeidis appeared in only 1 league game due to a series of injuries and health issues, scoring 4 points in 4 minutes of playing time.

On May 5, 2023, AEK Athens announced that Mavroeidis was going to retire from professional basketball and would remain on the club as team manager.

== National team career ==
Mavroeidis won the silver medal at the 2009 Mediterranean Games, while playing with the under-26 national team of Greece. With the senior men's Greek national basketball team, he played at the EuroBasket 2011. He was also a member of Greece's national team that played at the 2012 FIBA World Olympic Qualifying Tournament

He also played at the 2019 FIBA European World Cup qualification.

== Career statistics ==
Legend
GP	Games played	GS	Games started	MPG	Minutes per game
FG%	Field-goal percentage	3P%	3-point field-goal percentage	FT%	Free-throw percentage
RPG	Rebounds per game	APG	Assists per game	SPG	Steals per game
BPG	Blocks per game	PPG	Points per game	PIR	Performance index rating
**Bold**	Career high

=== EuroLeague ===
†	Denotes seasons in which Mavroeidis won the EuroLeague

Year	Team	GP	GS	MPG	FG%	3P%	FT%	RPG	APG	SPG	BPG	PPG	PIR
2009–10	Maroussi	16	0	**17.5**	**.557**	—	**.787**	**4.6**	**.5**	**.7**	**.9**	**9.1**	**12.7**
2011–12	Bilbao	**19**	1	13.1	.554	—	.765	3.5	**.5**	.4	.5	4.6	7.1
2012–13†	Olympiacos	11	**3**	6.4	.500	—	.667	1.6	—	.1	.3	1.5	2.2
Career		46	4	13.0	.552	—	.769	3.4	.4	.4	.6	5.4	7.8

=== Domestic Leagues ===
==== Regular season ====
Note: Only games in the primary domestic competitions are included. Therefore, games in cup or European competitions are left out.

Year	Team	League	GP	MPG	FG%	3P%	FT%	RPG	APG	SPG	BPG	PPG
2007–08	Maroussi	GBL	20	11.1	.611	.000	.667	2.6	.3	.7	.4	4.2
2008–09	Maroussi	GBL	25	14.4	.653	.000	.675	4.2	.4	.6	.5	4.8
2009–10	Maroussi	GBL	22	19.2	.587	.000	.688	5.6	.6	.3	**.9**	9.7
2012–13	Olympiacos	GBL	15	11.4	.636	.000	.697	3.5	.5	.4	.5	5.3
2014–15	Kifissia	GBL	**26**	27.1	.556	.000	.625	7.5	**1.5**	**1.2**	.8	14.0
2015–16	Kifissia	GBL	5	**31.4**	.473	.000	**.778**	**10.2**	1.4	.8	.4	**14.6**
2015–16	A.E.K.	GBL	21	16.2	**.674**	.000	.688	4.6	.5	.6	.7	8.8
2016–17	A.E.K.	GBL	22	17.3	.635	.000	.658	3.6	.9	.6	.5	7.8
2017–18	A.E.K.	GBL	**26**	15.2	.546	.000	.693	4.6	.4	.4	.3	7.7
2018–19	Kolossos	GBL	25	22.5	.553	.000	.752	7.4	1.3	.3	.4	11.1

=== FIBA Champions League ===
†	Denotes seasons in which Dimitrios Mavroeidis won the FIBA Champions League

Year	Team	GP	MPG	FG%	3P%	FT%	RPG	APG	SPG	BPG	PPG
2016–17	A.E.K.	15	16.4	.441	-	**.778**	4.0	**1.1**	**.7**	**.7**	6.7
2017–18†	A.E.K.	**20**	16.4	**.653**	-	.641	**4.2**	.7	.2	.2	**8.3**

== Awards and accomplishments ==
=== Pro career ===
- EuroLeague Champion: (2013)
- Greek Cup Winner (2): (2018, 2020)
- FIBA Champions League Champion: (2018)

=== Greek national team ===
- 2009 Mediterranean Games: Silver

== Personal life ==
Mavroeidis has roots from Vrises Lasithi.
