= Dimitrios Agravanis =

Greek basketball player (born 1994)

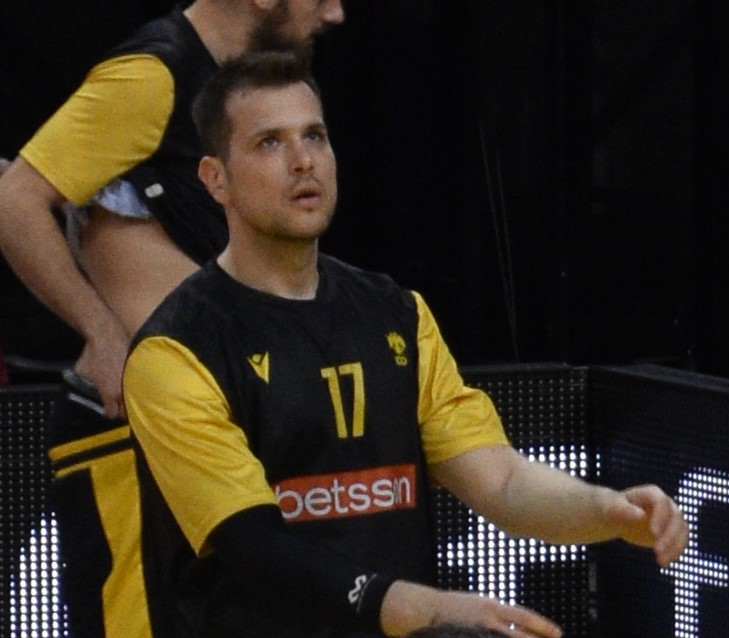
- Agravanis during an AEK Athens game in 2024

Free agent
- Position: Power forward / center

Personal information
- Born: December 20, 1994 (age 31) Marousi, Greece
- Listed height: 2.08 m (6 ft 10 in)
- Listed weight: 116 kg (256 lb)

Career information
- NBA draft: 2015: 2nd round, 59th overall pick
- Drafted by: Atlanta Hawks
- Playing career: 2010–present

Career history
- 2010–2012: Maroussi
- 2012–2013: Panionios
- 2013–2019: Olympiacos
- 2019–2022: Promitheas Patras
- 2022: Napoli
- 2022–2023: Peristeri
- 2023: Panathinaikos
- 2023: Río Breogán
- 2024: AEK Athens
- 2024: Hefei Storm
- 2024: Neptūnas Klaipėda
- 2025: Tindastóll
- 2025–2026: Hefei Storm
- 2026: Ningbo Rockets

Career highlights
- FIBA Intercontinental Cup champion (2013); 2× Greek League champion (2015, 2016); Greek Super Cup winner (2020); All-Greek League Team (2022); Greek League All-Star (2022); Panhellenic Youth Championship Top Scorer (2013)
- Stats at Basketball Reference

Dimitrios Agravanis (alternate spelling: Dimitris) (Greek: Δημήτρης Αγραβάνης; born December 20, 1994) is a Greek professional basketball player. He is a 2.08 m (6 ft 10 in) tall power forward, who can also play as a center.

== Early life ==
Agravanis was born on December 20, 1994, in the Maroussi suburb of Athens, Greece. His basketball journey started at age nine, when his father set up a basket at their home. Playing basketball soon became Dimitris' favorite pastime. He enrolled at the local youth system academy of the Greek club Maroussi Athens as a kid, where he eventually made the club's first team, and signed a professional contract with them in 2010.

== Professional career ==
=== Maroussi (2010–2012) ===
Agravanis began his professional career in 2010, with the Greek Basket League club Maroussi Athens.

=== Panionios (2012–2013) ===
In 2012, Agravanis made a move to the Greek Basket League club Panionios Athens, where he also competed in the European-wide 2nd-tier level EuroCup competition. Despite averaging fewer than 7 minutes per game with Panionios Athens, he showed promising signs of talent and ability in the times that he played.

=== Olympiacos (2013–2019) ===
In 2013, Agravanis made the big move to the Greek League and European-wide 1st-tier level EuroLeague powerhouse Olympiacos Piraeus, who believed in him as a strong prospect, and signed him to a 5-year contract. At the beginning of his first season, Olympiacos Piraeus won the 2013 edition of the FIBA Intercontinental Cup title.

In the 2014–15 EuroLeague season, Olympiacos Piraeus finished runners-up in the EuroLeague, after losing to Real Madrid in the EuroLeague Final. Olympiacos also won the 2014–15 Greek League season's championship, after beating Panathinaikos Athens in the finals of the Greek League playoffs. During the season, Agravanis averaged 6.4 points per game, in 14.4 minutes per game in the Greek League, and 4.1 points per game, in 12.5 minutes per game in the EuroLeague.

With Olympiacos Piraeus, he also won the Greek League championship in 2016. In late July 2017, he re-signed with Olympiacos, through the summer of 2020, as he penned a three-year, €1.4 million net income guaranteed deal with the Reds. On July 24, 2019, Olympiacos Piraeus announced that they had waived his contract, and Agravanis thus became a free agent, after spending six seasons with the Reds.

=== Promitheas Patras (2019–2022) ===
Agravanis signed with the Greek EuroCup club Promitheas Patras in 2019. He averaged 8.2 points and 5.5 rebounds per game in the EuroCup's 2019–20 season. Agravanis re-signed with the team on July 15, 2020. During the 2021-22 campaign, in 29 Greek domestic league games, Agravanis averaged 14 points, 6.3 rebounds, 2.5 assists and 1.2 steals, while playing around 25 minutes per contest.

=== Napoli (2022) ===
On September 27, 2022, the Italian A League club Napoli Basket, officially announced that they had signed Agravanis to a monthly contract, with a team option for the rest of the season. On October 31 of the same year, Napoli and Agravanis mutually parted ways. In 5 games played with the Napoli, Agravanis averaged 8.2 points and 4.8 rebounds per contest.

=== Peristeri (2022–2023) ===
On November 4, 2022, Agravanis signed a two-year (1+1) contract with Peristeri Athens, to play under the team's head coach Vassilis Spanoulis. On January 31, 2023, however, he parted ways with the club. In 8 Greek domestic league matches, he averaged 10.9 points, 5.1 rebounds and 2.4 assists, while playing around 23 minutes per contest.

=== Panathinaikos (2023) ===
On January 31, 2023, Agravanis, in a deeply controversial move for the fan base of Panathinaikos Athens, signed a two-and-a-half-year contract with the club, after having previously played with their derby of the eternal enemies arch-rivals, Olympiacos Piraeus. This marked Agravanis' return to the EuroLeague. In 4 EuroLeague games, he averaged 0.8 points and 2.5 rebounds, in 9 minutes per contest. Additionally, in 14 domestic Greek league matches, he averaged 8.2 points, 4.1 rebounds and 1.2 assists, in 18 minutes per contest. On July 15, 2023, Panathinaikos opted out of their mutual contract with him, and Agravanis thus became a free agent.

=== Río Breogán (2023) ===
On September 3, 2023, Agravanis signed with the Spanish ACB League club Río Breogán. He mutually parted ways with the team due to an injury.

=== AEK Athens (2024) ===
On January 15, 2024, Agravanis signed with the Greek club AEK Athens, for the remainder of the season.

=== Hefei Storm (2024) ===
On May 30, 2024, Agravanis signed with the Hefei Storm of the Chinese National Basketball League (NBL).

=== Neptūnas Klaipėda (2024) ===
On October 16, 2024, Agravanis signed a one-month contract with Neptūnas Klaipėda of the Lithuanian Basketball League (LKL).

=== Tindastóll (2025–present) ===
In January 2025, Agravanis signed with Tindastóll of the Icelandic Úrvalsdeild karla.

=== NBA draft rights ===
On 25 June 2015, Agravanis was selected with the 59th overall pick of the 2015 NBA draft by the NBA's Atlanta Hawks. His draft rights were then traded to the Cleveland Cavaliers in 2017, and were then traded to the Sacramento Kings a year later. On 8 February 2024, his rights were traded to the Milwaukee Bucks.

== National team career ==
=== Greek junior national team ===
As a member of the Greek junior national teams, Agravanis played at the following tournaments: the 2010 FIBA Europe Under-16 Championship, the 2011 FIBA Europe Under-18 Championship, the 2012 FIBA Europe Under-18 Championship, the 2013 FIBA Europe Under-20 Championship, and the 2014 FIBA Europe Under-20 Championship.

=== Greek senior national team ===
Agravanis has also been a member of the senior men's Greek national team. He was selected to Greece's 12 man roster for the 2016 Turin FIBA World Olympic Qualifying Tournament. He also played with Greece at the 2017 FIBA EuroBasket. He next represented Greece at the 2022 FIBA EuroBasket Qualifiers.

In September 2022, Agravanis represented Greece at the main 2022 FIBA EuroBasket tournament. Throughout the tournament, Agravanis averaged 6.3 points, 3.7 rebounds and 1.1 assists per game. Agravanis had his best performance in a game against Italy, during the tournament's group phase, where he accumulated 13 points, 5 rebounds, and 4 blocks in 24 minutes, as well as shooting an efficient 5/6 from the field, which helped Greece secure the victory. Agravanis then played with Greece at the 2023 FIBA World Cup Qualifiers.

== Personal life ==
Agravanis' younger brother, Ioannis, is also a professional basketball player.

== Awards and accomplishments ==
=== Youth career ===
- Panhellenic Youth Championship: Top Scorer (2013)

=== Pro career ===
- FIBA Intercontinental Cup Champion: (2013)
- 2× Greek League Champion: (2015, 2016)
- Greek Super Cup Winner: (2020)
- All-Greek League First Team: (2022)
- Greek League All-Star: (2022)

== Career statistics ==
Legend
GP	Games played	GS	Games started	MPG	Minutes per game
FG%	Field-goal percentage	3P%	3-point field-goal percentage	FT%	Free-throw percentage
RPG	Rebounds per game	APG	Assists per game	SPG	Steals per game
BPG	Blocks per game	PPG	Points per game	PIR	Performance index rating
**Bold**	Career high

=== EuroLeague ===
Year	Team	GP	GS	MPG	FG%	3P%	FT%	RPG	APG	SPG	BPG	PPG	PIR
2013–14	Olympiacos	8	**4**	7.3	.077	.000	**1.000**	1.5	.3	.3	.3	0.5	-1.0
2014–15	Olympiacos	20	2	**12.5**	.425	.235	.417	2.7	**.4**	.3	.4	**4.1**	2.7
2015–16	Olympiacos	17	3	12.2	.373	**.250**	.667	2.2	**.4**	.3	.4	3.6	**3.1**
2016–17	Olympiacos	**25**	3	11.2	.341	.229	.800	2.4	.2	.4	.2	3.6	**3.1**
2017–18	Olympiacos	8	0	11.4	.321	.200	.700	**2.9**	.1	.1	—	3.5	2.4
2018–19	Olympiacos	1	0	5.0	**.500**	.000	.500	—	—	**2.0**	**1.0**	3.0	3.0
2022–23	Panathinaikos	4	0	8.5	.077	.000	.500	2.5	—	.8	.3	.8	-1.5
Career		83	12	11.2	.346	.209	.676	2.4	.3	.3	.3	3.3	2.3

=== Domestic Leagues ===
Year	Team	League	GP	MPG	FG%	3P%	FT%	RPG	APG	SPG	BPG	PPG
2010-11	Marousi	GBL	1	1.0	.000	.000	**1.000**	.0	.0	.0	.0	2.0
2011–12	Marousi	GBL	14	11.5	.333	.400	.560	2.8	.3	.5	.4	3.8
2012–13	Panionios	GBL	11	6.5	.167	.182	.600	1.5	.4	.5	.4	1.3
2013–14	Olympiacos	GBL	13	7.7	.343	.182	.800	1.2	.5	.3	.1	2.6
2014–15	Olympiacos	GBL	18	16.2	.439	.317	.649	3.5	.7	.8	**.9**	6.8
2015–16	Olympiacos	GBL	**22**	13.3	.455	.364	.561	3.2	.5	.7	.7	6.0
2016–17	Olympiacos	GBL	19	13.4	.483	.292	.400	4.6	.5	.3	.3	5.8
2017–18	Olympiacos	GBL	5	18.0	.472	.250	.850	5.2	1.4	.2	.2	11.0
2018–19	Olympiacos	GBL	10	4.9	.462	**.429**	.833	.8	.1	.0	.0	3.2
2019–20	Promitheas	GBL	17	21.2	.414	.346	.426	5.0	1.3	.6	.4	10.8
2020–21	Promitheas	GBL	21	**25.4**	.420	.326	.728	5.9	1.4	.8	.5	12.8
2021–22	Promitheas	GBL	19	23.9	**.537**	.278	.592	**6.9**	**2.3**	**1.2**	.4	**13.8**
