= Othello Hunter =

American-Liberian professional basketball player

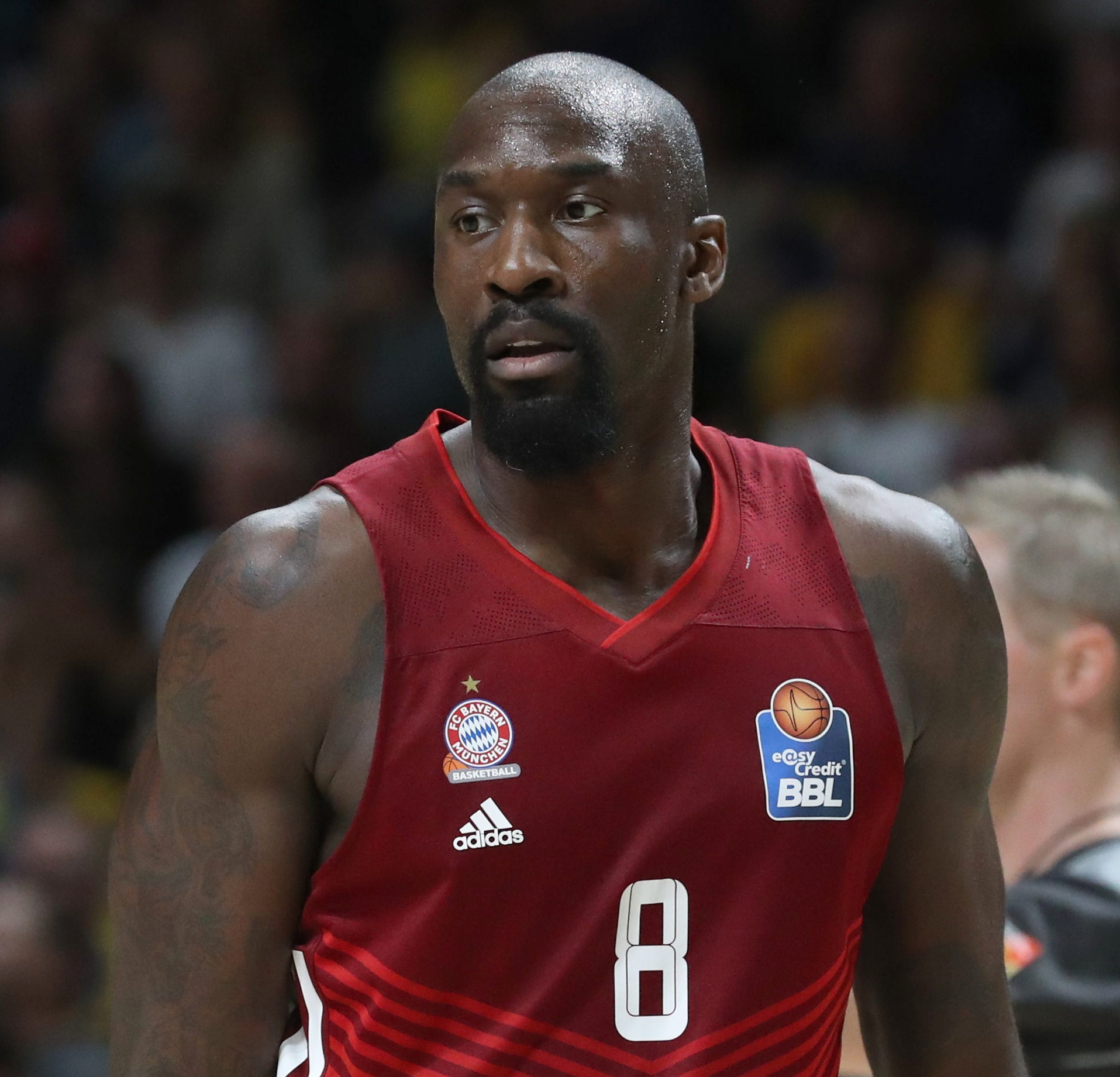
- Hunter with Bayern Munich in 2022

Personal information
- Born: May 28, 1986 (age 40) Winston-Salem, North Carolina, U.S.
- Listed height: 6 ft 8 in (2.03 m)
- Listed weight: 225 lb (102 kg)

Career information
- High school: Richard J. Reynolds (Winston-Salem, North Carolina)
- College: Hillsborough CC (2004–2006); Ohio State (2006–2008)
- NBA draft: 2008: undrafted
- Playing career: 2008–2023
- Position: Center / power forward
- Number: 50, 44, 8

Career history
- 2008–2010: Atlanta Hawks
- 2009: →Anaheim Arsenal
- 2010: Ilysiakos
- 2010–2011: Dinamo Sassari
- 2011–2012: Shandong Lions
- 2012: Azovmash Mariupol
- 2012–2013: Valladolid
- 2013: Jiangsu Monkey Kings
- 2013–2014: Montepaschi Siena
- 2014–2016: Olympiacos
- 2016–2017: Real Madrid
- 2017–2019: CSKA Moscow
- 2019–2021: Maccabi Tel Aviv
- 2021–2023: Bayern Munich

Career highlights
- EuroLeague champion (2019); 2× VTB United League champion (2018, 2019); 2× Greek League champion (2015, 2016); 2x Israeli League champion (2020, 2021); Spanish Cup winner (2017); Italian Supercup winner (2013); All-VTB United League First Team (2019)
- Stats at NBA.com
- Stats at Basketball Reference

Tegba Othello Hunter (born May 28, 1986) is an American-Liberian former professional basketball player. Standing at 6 ft 8 in (2.03 m), he played at the center position. Hunter played four seasons of college basketball including two seasons for Hillsborough CC and two seasons for Ohio State University.

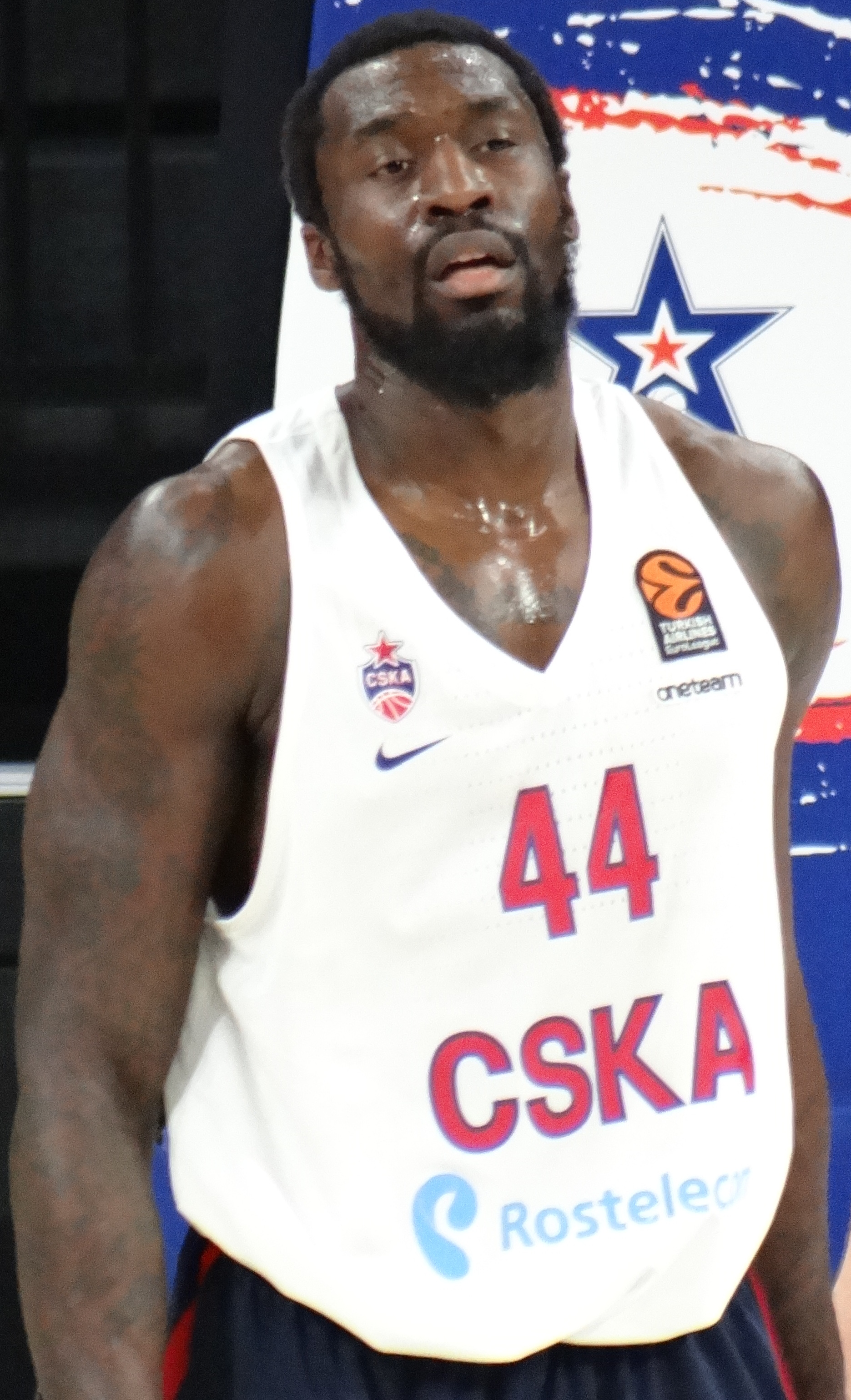
Othello Hunter in 2017

== High school career ==
Hunter attended Richard J. Reynolds High School, in his hometown of Winston-Salem, North Carolina where he played high school basketball.

== College career ==
After high school, Hunter attended Hillsborough Community College, in Tampa, Hillsborough County, FL for two years, and he became a part of the Ohio State University's 2006 "Thad Five" recruiting class. After playing two seasons at Ohio State University, with the Buckeyes, during which he managed to post the seventh-best single-season field-goal percentage in school history, he entered the 2008 NBA draft, in which he was not selected.

== Professional career ==
=== NBA ===
Hunter joined the Atlanta Hawks' summer league squad in the summer of 2008. In five summer league games, he posted 13.2 points per game, 2.0 assists per game, 1.2 steals per game, and led his team with 6.2 rebounds per game. On August 11, 2008, the Hawks announced that they had signed Hunter to a contract. Hunter was waived by the Hawks in January 2010.

=== Europe ===
In 2012, after playing three months with the Ukrainian SuperLeague squad Azovmash Mariupol, he signed with the Spanish ACB League team Blancos de Rueda Valladolid. On August 26, 2013, Hunter officially signed a one-year deal with the Italian League team Montepaschi Siena.

On July 8, 2014, he signed a contract with the Greek League team Olympiacos. In his first season with the team, in 2014–15, Olympiacos advanced to the 2015 Final Four of the EuroLeague, where they lost in the EuroLeague Finals game to the host team Real Madrid. Olympiacos finished the season winning the 2014–15 Greek League championship, Hunter's first major title in his career, as they swept their arch rivals Panathinaikos, in the finals series of the Greek League playoffs. He also won the 2016 Greek League championship with Olympiacos.

On August 29, 2016, he signed a two-year deal with Real Madrid.

On July 13, 2017, Hunter signed a two-year contract with Russian club CSKA Moscow. On May 23, 2019, Hunter recorded a season-high 22 points, shooting 9-of-10 from the field, along with six rebounds in a 98–82 win over Zenit Saint Petersburg. Hunter went on to win the 2019 EuroLeague championship with CSKA.

On July 16, 2019, Hunter joined the Israeli team Maccabi Tel Aviv, signing a one-year deal with an option for another one. On December 12, 2019, Hunter recorded a EuroLeague career-high 20 points, along with seven rebounds in a 90–80 win over his former team CSKA Moscow.

On February 3, 2020, Hunter signed a 1+1-year contract extension with Maccabi. On June 24, 2021, Hunter amicably parted ways with the Israeli club.

On July 21, 2021, he has signed with Bayern Munich of the Basketball Bundesliga (BBL).

== Career statistics ==
Legend
GP	Games played	GS	Games started	MPG	Minutes per game
FG%	Field-goal percentage	3P%	3-point field-goal percentage	FT%	Free-throw percentage
RPG	Rebounds per game	APG	Assists per game	SPG	Steals per game
BPG	Blocks per game	PPG	Points per game	PIR	Performance index rating
**Bold**	Career high

=== NBA ===
==== Regular season ====
Year	Team	GP	GS	MPG	FG%	3P%	FT%	RPG	APG	SPG	BPG	PPG
2008–09	Atlanta	**16**	0	**5.8**	**.550**	—	.000	1.5	**.1**	**.1**	**.3**	1.4
2010–11	Atlanta	7	0	4.7	.333	—	**.750**	**1.7**	.0	.0	.1	**1.6**
Career		23	0	5.4	.469	—	.333	1.6	.0	.0	.3	1.4

==== Playoffs ====
Year	Team	GP	GS	MPG	FG%	3P%	FT%	RPG	APG	SPG	BPG	PPG
2008	Atlanta	4	0	3.8	.667	—	—	1.5	.0	.3	.3	1.0

=== EuroLeague ===
†	Denotes seasons in which Hunter won the EuroLeague

Year	Team	GP	GS	MPG	FG%	3P%	FT%	RPG	APG	SPG	BPG	PPG	PIR
2013–14	Mens Sana	10	8	20.8	.492	.250	.500	**6.7**	.5	.3	**1.1**	6.3	8.2
2014–15	Olympiacos	29	4	19.0	.615	—	.625	4.8	.6	.4	.4	8.2	9.2
2015–16	Olympiacos	22	5	21.1	.567	—	.643	6.0	.5	.7	.3	9.4	10.8
2016–17	Real Madrid	35	0	16.7	**.647**	.000	.683	4.5	.6	.5	.3	7.6	9.9
2017–18	CSKA Moscow	30	9	19.3	.615	.000	.743	5.5	.7	**.9**	.3	8.2	11.6
2018–19†	CSKA Moscow	**36**	**31**	17.9	.596	—	.727	4.3	.9	.5	.4	7.7	9.4
2019–20	Maccabi	27	16	**23.3**	.581	.000	.712	6.4	**1.3**	.5	.4	**10.3**	**14.2**
2020–21	Maccabi	27	5	20.9	.509	.000	.714	5.3	1.0	.8	.6	8.0	10.7
2021–22	Bayern Munich	35	0	21.2	.558	.375	.616	5.0	1.1	.6	.5	7.7	10.2
2022–23	Bayern Munich	24	5	17.9	.507	**.436**	**.778**	4.8	1.0	.6	.4	7.8	9.4
Career		275	83	19.6	.575	.360	.687	5.2	.8	.6	.4	8.2	10.5

== Personal life ==
Hunter is of Liberian descent.
