= Nikos Pappas (basketball) =

Greek basketball player and politician

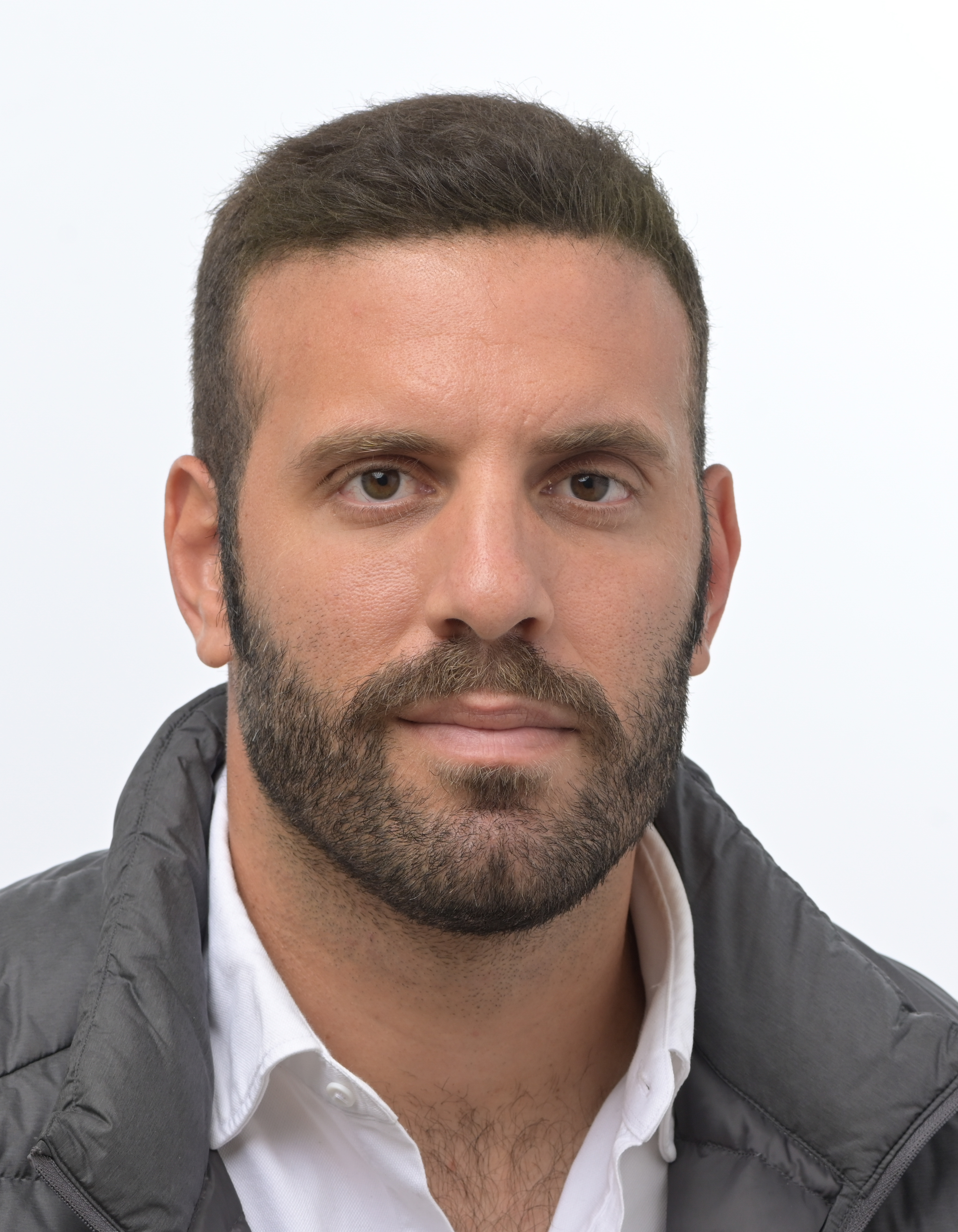
- Official portrait, 2024

Personal information
- Born: July 11, 1990 (age 36) Maroussi, Attica, Greece
- Listed height: 6 ft 4.75 in (1.95 m)
- Listed weight: 220 lb (100 kg)

Career information
- NBA draft: 2012: undrafted
- Playing career: 2006–2023
- Position: Shooting guard / small forward

Career history
- 2006–2008: Panellinios
- 2008–2011: Bilbao
- 2008–2009: →Real Madrid B
- 2009–2011: →Kolossos Rodou
- 2012: PAOK Thessaloniki
- 2012–2013: Panionios
- 2013–2020: Panathinaikos
- 2020: Hapoel Jerusalem
- 2021: Zielona Góra
- 2021–2022: AEK Athens
- 2022–2023: Panathinaikos

Career highlights
- 5× Greek League champion (2014, 2017–2020); 5× Greek Cup winner (2014–2017, 2019); All-Greek League Team (2013); Greek League Top Scorer (2013); Greek All-Star Game MVP (2014); 4× Greek All-Star (2013, 2014, 2018, 2020); Greek League Best Young Player (2013); Albert Schweitzer Tournament MVP (2008)
Medals
Men's basketball
Representing Greece
FIBA Under-19 World Cup
Silver medal – second place	2009 New Zealand	Under-19
European U-20 Championship
Gold medal – first place	2009 Greece	Under-20
Silver medal – second place	2010 Croatia	Under-20
European U-18 Championship
Gold medal – first place	2008 Greece	Under-18
Silver medal – second place	2007 Spain	Under-18

Nikos Pappas MEP

Member of the European Parliament for Greece
- Incumbent
- Assumed office 21 July 2023

Personal details
- Party: Syriza (2023–2025); Independent (2025-Current)

Nikolaos "Nikos" Pappas (Greek: Νικόλαος "Νίκος" Παππάς, born July 11, 1990) is a Greek politician and former professional basketball player. Standing at 1.95 m (6 ft 5 in), he played at the shooting guard and small forward positions.

He is currently an independent Member of the European Parliament, after being removed from Syriza for assaulting a journalist.

== Early years ==
Pappas is from Aidipsos, where he grew up. He started his career at the local club Syllas. Then, he transferred to Locros Atalanti. His mother is Greek Cypriot from Famagusta.

== Professional career ==
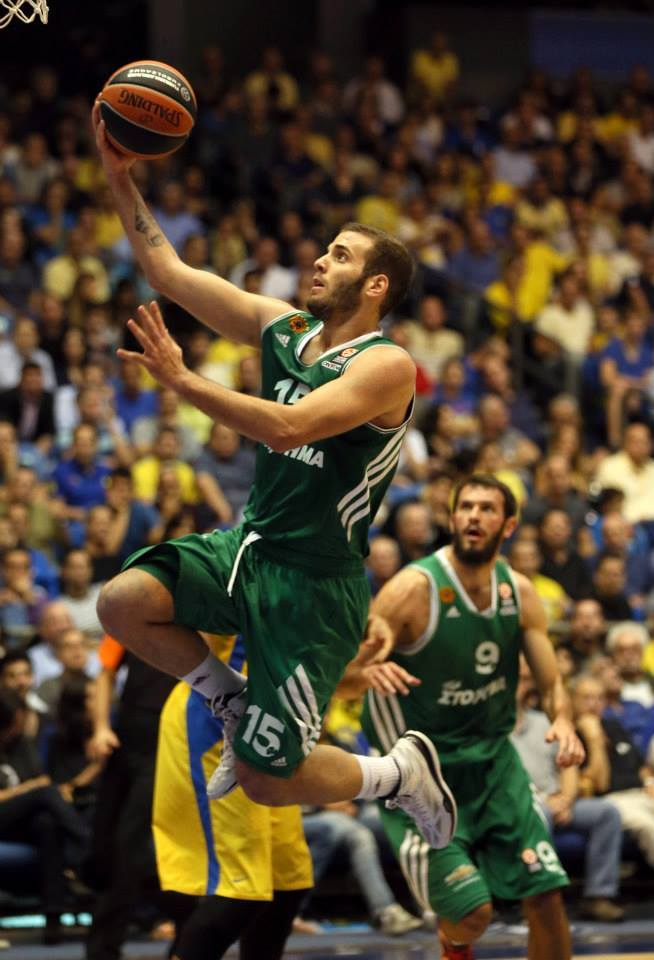
Pappas with Panathinaikos, shooting a lay-up against Maccabi Tel Aviv

Pappas made his professional debut in the Greek League with Panellinios during the 2006–07 season. He made his debut in Europe's continent-wide second-tier level competition, the EuroCup, with Panellinios during the 2007–08 season, before signing a 5-year contract with the Spanish League club Bilbao Basket in 2008.

He was loaned to the reserve team of Real Madrid, Real Madrid B, of the Spanish 4th Division, for the 2008–09 season. He was loaned to the Greek League club Kolossos Rodou for the 2009–10 and 2010–11 seasons, and named the 2010 Greek League Best Young Player. In February 2012, he joined PAOK. He moved to Panionios for the 2012–13 season, becoming the Greek League Top Scorer and a member of the Greek League Best Five in 2013.

=== Panathinaikos (2013–2020) ===
On 20 June 2013, Pappas joined the Greek club Panathinaikos. He was announced as a new player of Panathinaikos for the following three seasons, along with his Panionios teammate Vlado Janković. During his second season with Panathinaikos, Pappas switched his jersey number from 15 to 11.

On 22 April 2015, after winning his first EuroLeague MVP of the Round award and the third week's game of the EuroLeague playoffs, scoring 25 points against CSKA Moscow, it was officially announced that Pappas had renewed his contract with Panathinaikos until 2018. On 16 May 2015, Pappas suffered a torn ACL injury and a tear of his meniscus after a fall in a Greek League game against Kolossos Rodou, having been fouled on a play by Vassilis Toliopoulos. He was operated on the day after, and his return to playing basketball was scheduled at 5–6 months at the earliest. On November 30, 2015, in a Greek League game against Lavrio, Pappas made his first re-appearance in an official game, 6 1/2 months after his injury. He scored 2 points in the game.

During a press conference on July 3, 2020, it was confirmed by the team's new head coach Georgios Vovoras that Pappas was parting ways with the Athenian club after seven seasons.

=== Hapoel Jerusalem (2020) ===
On September 23, 2020, Pappas signed with Hapoel Jerusalem for the duration of the Basketball Champions League Final-8.

=== Basket Zielona Góra (2021) ===
On February 23, 2021, he signed with Stelmet Zielona Góra of the Polish League.

=== AEK (2021–2022) ===
On August 16, 2021, Pappas signed with AEK Athens of the Greek Basket League. During the season, he regularly sustained injuries and ultimately spent the final stretch of the season under suspension after falling out with new coach Curro Segura, who took over the team after Stefanos Dedas signed with CSKA Moscow. In 12 league games, he averaged 12.4 points, 2.5 rebounds, 2.8 assists and 1.4 steals, playing around 27 minutes per contest.

=== Final season with Panathinaikos (2022–2023) ===
After assisting the team in the pre-season, on December 3, 2022, Pappas was signed on for the rest of the 2022–2023 campaign in order to close out his playing career with his beloved Panathinaikos. He made his debut on December 11, 2022, in a match against AEK Athens.

Pappas appeared in a total of only four domestic league games, scoring one basket against Olympiacos in Game 4 of the Greek Basket League finals.

Reportedly, Pappas pledged to donate the entirety of his contract pay to the sanitation workers at the Athens Olympic Stadium complex.

On July 21, 2023, Panathinaikos officially bade farewell to the retiring player.

== National team career ==
=== Greek junior national team ===
As a member of the junior national basketball teams of Greece, Pappas won the silver medal at the 2007 FIBA Europe Under-18 Championship. He was named the MVP of the 2008 Albert Schweitzer Tournament, where he also helped Greece to defeat Team USA Under-18, in a game where he scored 27 points. He also won the gold medal at the 2008 FIBA Europe Under-18 Championship, where he was also voted to the All-Tournament Team.

Pappas also played at the 2009 Nike Hoop Summit, where he helped the World Select Team defeat Team USA 97–89. He also won the silver medal at the 2009 FIBA Under-19 World Cup with Greece's junior national team, where he was also voted to the All-Tournament Team. Pappas also won the gold medal at the 2009 FIBA Europe Under-20 Championship and the silver medal at the 2010 FIBA Europe Under-20 Championship, where he was named to the All-Tournament Team after leading the tournament in scoring.

=== Greek senior national team ===
Pappas first trained with the senior men's Greek national basketball team in 2010. In the summer of 2016, it was reported that Pappas was interested in playing with the senior Cypriot national basketball team, due to his mother's Greek Cypriot origins. However, in 2017, he was recalled to Greece's senior national team.

On 19 August 2017, he scored 22 points (career high with the senior Greek NT) in a friendly game against Great Britain, in London. He then played with Greece at the EuroBasket 2017.

== Wheelchair basketball career ==
In 2020, Pappas announced that he was to become a member of Panathinaikos' wheelchair basketball team. This became official in February 2023, with Pappas becoming a player simultaneously active in both a basketball and wheelchair basketball team. He made his debut on 8 April 2023 in a game against PASKA, during which he scored 5 points.

== Player profile ==
Pappas began his career playing as a combo guard with the junior national teams of Greece, and in his early club career. After maturing as a player, he became more of a pure shooting guard who can occasionally operate as a swingman.

== Career statistics ==
Legend
GP	Games played	GS	Games started	MPG	Minutes per game
FG%	Field-goal percentage	3P%	3-point field-goal percentage	FT%	Free-throw percentage
RPG	Rebounds per game	APG	Assists per game	SPG	Steals per game
BPG	Blocks per game	PPG	Points per game	PIR	Performance index rating
**Bold**	Career high

=== EuroLeague ===
Year	Team	GP	GS	MPG	FG%	3P%	FT%	RPG	APG	SPG	BPG	PPG	PIR
2013–14	Panathinaikos	13	2	8.6	.467	.385	.750	.8	.5	.3	.1	4.8	3.5
2014–15	Panathinaikos	22	1	**20.3**	**.487**	**.387**	**.909**	**2.3**	**1.9**	**.8**	.1	**10.8**	**12.2**
2015–16	Panathinaikos	5	0	8.3	.444	.000	.700	.4	.4	.0	.0	3.0	2.6
2016–17	Panathinaikos	29	2	17.2	.426	.260	.764	1.6	1.3	.6	.1	5.5	5.0
2017–18	Panathinaikos	**32**	1	17.6	.423	.324	.776	1.1	.9	.6	**.4**	8.2	5.8
2018–19	Panathinaikos	19	**5**	17.9	.342	.271	.826	1.0	1.2	**.8**	.0	6.8	4.2
2019–20	Panathinaikos	10	2	11.6	.417	.375	.750	1.3	.9	.4	.1	4.4	3.5
Career		130	13	14.5	.507	.316	.808	1.4	1.1	.6	.1	6.2	5.2

== Awards and accomplishments ==
=== Pro career ===
- Greek League Best Young Player: (2010)
- 4× Greek League All-Star: (2013, 2014, 2018, 2020)
- Greek League All-Star Game MVP: (2014)
- Greek League Top Scorer: (2013)
- Greek League Best Five: (2013)
- 5× Greek Cup Winner: (2014, 2015, 2016, 2017, 2019)
- 5× Greek League Champion: (2014, 2017, 2018, 2019, 2020)
- EuroLeague MVP of the Round: 2015 (Playoff Game 3)

=== Greek junior national team ===
- 2007 ISF World Schools' Championship: Gold
- 2007 ISF World Schools' Championship: Top Scorer
- 2007 ISF World Schools' Championship: MVP (40 points in the final)
- 2007 FIBA Europe Under-18 Championship: Silver
- 2008 Albert Schweitzer Tournament: Gold
- 2008 Albert Schweitzer Tournament: Top Scorer
- 2008 Albert Schweitzer Tournament: MVP
- 2008 FIBA Europe Under-18 Championship: Gold
- 2008 FIBA Europe Under-18 Championship: All-Tournament Team
- 2009 FIBA Under-19 World Cup: Silver
- 2009 FIBA Under-19 World Cup: All-Tournament Team
- 2009 FIBA Europe Under-20 Championship: Gold
- 2010 FIBA Europe Under-20 Championship: Silver
- 2010 FIBA Europe Under-20 Championship: Top Scorer
- 2010 FIBA Europe Under-20 Championship: All-Tournament Team

== Political career ==
On 9 June, he participated in the 2024 European Parliament elections as a candidate to be an MEP for Syriza, being elected by 125,893 votes and coming out 3rd in Syriza and 11th nationwide.

Pappas serves as a member of the European Parliament Committee on Industry, Research, and Energy, as well as the Committee on Culture and Education, and is a member of the Delegation for relations with the United States. He is a substitute for the Committee on Petitions, the Delegation to EU-Turkey Joint Parliamentary committee, and the Delegation for Relations with the Arab Peninsula.

Concerns were brought to the ethics committee in December 2025 as a journalist claimed Pappas assaulted him in Strasbourg. Pappas denied physical assault, claiming that there was only a verbal altercation and that he only pushed the journalist. Due to the assault allegations, Pappas was expelled from the Syriza party, and many of his responsibilities as a member were removed for a suspension of 1 year beginning in early 2026. During the 1 year suspension period, Pappas is unable to exercise coordinator roles and co-sign group initiatives in his committees. After 1 year, end of the suspension and return to his original abilities as a member of parliament will be reconsidered by the ethics committee.
