= 2014–15 Greek Basket League =

Greek Basket League
- Duration: October 12, 2014 – June 17, 2015
- Games played: 182 (regular season); 25 (playoffs)
- Teams: 14
- TV partners: OTE Sport, Nova Sports

Regular season
- Top seed: Olympiacos
- Season MVP: (Bulgaria) Sasha Vezenkov
- Relegated: Panelefsiniakos; Panionios

Finals
- Champions: Olympiacos; 11th title
- Runners-up: Panathinaikos
- Third place: PAOK
- Fourth place: Aris
- Finals MVP: (Greece) Giorgos Printezis

Statistical leaders
Points	(Bulgaria) Sasha Vezenkov	469
Rebounds	(Senegal) Mouhammad Faye	221
Assists	(Greece) Vassilis Spanoulis	140
Index Rating	(Bulgaria) Sasha Vezenkov	553
- All statistics correct as of June 15, 2015.

The 2014–15 Basket League season was the 23rd season of the top-tier Greek professional basketball league, since its establishment in 1992, and the 75th season of top-flight Greek basketball overall.

The season started on October 12, 2014, and ended June 14, 2015. Olympiacos won the title, after they beat Panathinaikos 3–0 in the Finals. The season ended on June 17, when PAOK won the third-place series over Aris.

== Teams ==
Location of teams in 2014–15 Greek Basket League

Club	Position 2013–14	Greek League Arena	Capacity
AEK	1st (A2)	OAKA Indoor Hall, Marousi	19,250
Nea Kifissia	5th	Zirineio Indoor Hall, Kifisia	1,500
Apollon Patras	8th	Apollon Patras Indoor Hall, Patras	3,500
Aris	7th	Alexandrio Melathron, Thessaloniki	5,138
KAOD	6th	Drama Indoor Hall, Drama	1,700
Kolossos	10th	Venetoklio Indoor Hall, Rhodes	1,700
Koroivos	2nd (A2)	Amaliada Indoor Hall, Koroivos	2,000
Olympiacos	2nd	Peace and Friendship Stadium, Piraeus	12,000
Panathinaikos	1st	OAKA Indoor Hall, Marousi	19,250
Panelefsiniakos	12th	Elefsina Indoor Hall, Eleusis	1,100
Panionios	4th	Nea Smyrni Indoor Hall, Nea Smyrni	1,832
PAOK	3rd	PAOK Sports Arena, Pylaia	8,500
Rethymno Aegean	9th	Rethymno Indoor Hall, Rethymno	1,600
Trikala	11th	Trikala Indoor Hall, Trikala	2,500

== Regular season ==
=== Standings ===
Pos	Team	Pld	W	L	PF	PA	PD	Pts	Qualification or relegation
1	Olympiacos (Note: 2015–16 Euroleague)	26	25	1	2160	1689	+471	51	Qualification to Playoffs
2	Panathinaikos	26	23	3	2102	1672	+430	49	Qualification to Playoffs
3	PAOK	26	19	7	1911	1802	+109	45	Qualification to Playoffs
4	Aris	26	16	10	1886	1847	+39	42	Qualification to Playoffs
5	AEK	26	15	11	2084	1965	+119	41	Qualification to Playoffs
6	Rethymno Aegean	26	14	12	1926	1931	−5	40	Qualification to Playoffs
7	Kolossos Rodou	26	13	13	1893	1956	−63	39	Qualification to Playoffs
8	Koroivos	26	11	15	1886	1952	−66	37	Qualification to Playoffs
9	KAOD	26	10	16	1853	1906	−53	36	
10	Apollon Patras	26	10	16	1719	1808	−89	36	
11	Nea Kifissia	26	9	17	1862	1958	−96	35	
12	Trikala Aries	26	8	18	2008	2196	−188	34	
13	Panelefsiniakos	26	6	20	1801	2078	−277	32	Relegated to Greek A2 Basket League
14	Panionios	26	3	23	1814	2118	−304	29	Relegated to Greek A2 Basket League

=== Results ===
Home \ Away	AEK	APO	ARIS	KAO	KOL	KOR	NEA	OLY	PAO	PNF	PAN	PAOK	RET	TRI
AEK		67–64	93–77	89–79	96–73	76–67	97–73	62–81	62–70	105–80	77–64	85–93	85–77	96–73
Apollon Patras	48–89		76–60	63–67	71–55	77–72	69–65	56–67	71–77	91–82	93–84	80–70	56–71	83–70
Aris	86–75	69–64		78–75	65–77	80–59	83–80	58–69	56–72	79–61	67–63	62–57	68–62	91–60
KAOD	66–77	82–76	70–74		68–72	78–62	67–51	64–82	65–81	76–61	80–69	64–68	91–76	62–57
Kolossos Rodou	65–72	64–63	78–77	84–80		82–75	64–73	64–88	61–81	83–68	70–56	67–69	77–63	77–69
Koroivos	80–67	74–68	73–69	71–69	81–73		79–70	70–87	59–72	73–74	83–74	65–61	72–75	80–58
Nea Kifissia	75–80	63–54	65–79	78–79	73–84	76–83		68–67	66–72	68–67	86–85	60–62	64–74	81–72
Olympiacos	83–77	82–56	84–68	72–62	93–65	79–73	77–63		81–75	104–55	108–65	80–55	80–60	87–72
Panathinaikos	92–58	80–52	76–69	86–55	90–65	79–64	76–66	66–77		91–54	92–61	83–69	79–70	107–76
Panelefsiniakos	81–72	71–72	70–78	83–69	75–69	70–72	68–79	66–102	51–82		68–70	58–69	70–80	77–81
Panionios	78–94	68–71	71–65	72–79	76–92	74–69	89–98	56–73	46–79	94–95		61–65	79–84	60–98
PAOK	73–71	68–46	77–78	72–64	77–72	84–71	78–67	72–88	71–54	69–59	79–65		88–79	105–73
Rethymno Aegean	80–79	88–81	66–69	72–66	70–66	78–66	63–58	54–64	77–94	85–67	75–65	71–79		81–83
Trikala Aries	87–83	83–70	74–81	80–76	87–94	102–93	89–96	87–105	70–96	65–70	78–69	79–81	85–95	

Legend: Blue = home team win; Red = away team win.

== Playoffs ==
Teams in bold won the playoff series. Numbers to the left of each team indicate the team's original playoff seeding. Numbers to the right indicate the score of each playoff game.

=== Bracket ===
Quarterfinals
1	**Olympiacos**	**91**	**91**
8	Koroivos	52	59
4	**Aris**	**71**	54	**79**
5	AEK	69	**92**	68
2	**Panathinaikos**	**98**	73	**100**
7	Kolossos Rodou	71	**75**	70
3	**PAOK**	**66**	61	**75**
6	Rethymno Aegean	59	**65**	62

Semifinals
1	**Olympiacos**	**98**	**92**	74	**79**
4	Aris	53	57	**84**	62
2	**Panathinaikos**	**83**	**75**	**83**
3	PAOK	58	61	65

Finals
1	**Olympiacos**	**76**	**76**	**93**
2	Panathinaikos	70	69	74
3rd Place
3	**PAOK**	**67**	88	**62**	**77**
4	Aris	60	**92**	51	71

== Finals ==
=== Game 1 ===
7 June 2015	**Olympiacos**	**76**–70	Panathinaikos
19:15	Scoring by quarter: 10–**17**, **23**–17, **22**–16, **21**–20
	Pts: Sloukas 16, Dunston, Lojeski 13, Printezis 12; Rebs: Dunston 12, Mantzaris, Printezis 6 Asts: Mantzaris 4	Boxscore		Arena: Peace and Friendship Stadium; Referees: Christodoulou, Karakatsounis, Psarianos

=== Game 2 ===
10 June 2015	Panathinaikos	69–**76**	**Olympiacos**
19:15	Scoring by quarter: 14–**21**, **19**–17, **17**–16, 19–**22**
		Boxscore	Pts: Printezis 17, Darden 14, Spanoulis 11; Rebs: Dunston 6, Petway 5 Asts: Mantzaris 6	Arena: O.A.C.A. Olympic Indoor Hall; Referees: Anastopoulos, Piloidis, Mitsopoulos

=== Game 3 ===
14 June 2015	**Olympiacos**	**93**–74	Panathinaikos
19:30	Scoring by quarter: **16**–12, **35**–27, **24**–19, **18**–16
	Pts: Spanoulis 23, Printezis 12, Lojeski 11; Rebs: Hunter 7, Printezis 6 Asts: Spanoulis 5	Boxscore		Arena: Peace and Friendship Stadium; Referees: Gontas, Sxinas, Foufis

== Final league standings ==
Pos	Team	Pld	W	L	Qualification or relegation
1	Olympiacos	35	33	2	2015–16 Euroleague Regular Season
2	Panathinaikos	35	28	7	2015–16 Euroleague Regular Season
3	PAOK	36	24	12	2015–16 Eurocup Regular Season
4	Aris	37	20	17	2015–16 Eurocup Regular Season
5	AEK	29	16	13	2015–16 Eurocup Regular Season
6	Rethymno Aegean	29	15	14	
7	Kolossos Rodou	29	14	15	
8	Koroivos	28	11	17	
9	KAOD	26	10	16	
10	Apollon Patras	26	10	16	
11	Nea Kifissia	26	9	17	
12	Trikala Aries	26	8	18	
13	Panelefsiniakos (R)	26	6	20	Relegated to 2015–16 Greek A2 League (Note: Panelefsiniakos and Panionios were relegated down to the 3rd-tier level, Greek B Basket League, due to financial problems.)
14	Panionios (R)	26	3	23	Relegated to 2015–16 Greek A2 League

(R) Relegated
Notes:

Greek Basket League 2014–15
Champions

**11th title**

== Awards ==
=== Greek League MVP ===
- (Bulgaria) Sasha Vezenkov – Aris

=== Greek League Finals MVP ===
- (Greece) Giorgos Printezis – Olympiacos

=== All-Greek League Team ===
- (Greece) Kostas Sloukas – Olympiacos
- (Greece) Vassilis Spanoulis – Olympiacos
- (Greece) Giorgos Printezis – Olympiacos
- (Bulgaria) Sasha Vezenkov – Aris
- (Greece) Loukas Mavrokefalidis – Panathinaikos

=== Best Coach ===
- (Greece) Ioannis Sfairopoulos – Olympiacos

=== Defensive Player of the Year ===
- (United States) Bryant Dunston – Olympiacos

=== Best Young Player ===
- (Bulgaria) Sasha Vezenkov – Aris

=== Most Improved Player ===
- (Bulgaria) Sasha Vezenkov – Aris

=== Most Popular Player ===
- (Greece) Vassilis Spanoulis – Olympiacos

== Statistical leaders ==
Greek Basket League stats leaders are counted by totals, rather than averages, and include both regular season.

=== Performance Index Rating ===
Pos.	Player	Club	PIR
**1.**	(Bulgaria) **Sasha Vezenkov**	Aris	**553**
2.	(Greece) Dimitris Mavroeidis	Nea Kifissia	514
3.	(Senegal) Mouhammad Faye	Rethymno	449
4.	(Uruguay) Esteban Batista	Panathinaikos	385
5.	(United Kingdom) Pops Mensah-Bonsu	AEK	363

=== Points ===
Pos.	Player	Club	Total points
**1.**	(Bulgaria) **Sasha Vezenkov**	Aris	**469**
2.	(United States) Muhammad El-Amin	Apollon Patras	373
3.	(Greece) Dimitris Mavroeidis	Nea Kifissia	363
4.	(Canada) Carl English	AEK	351
5.	(Greece) Thodoris Zaras	KAOD	331

=== Rebounds ===
Pos.	Player	Club	Total Rebounds
**1.**	(Senegal) **Mouhammad Faye**	Rethymno	**221**
2.	(Bulgaria) Sasha Vezenkov	Aris	201
3.	(Greece) Dimitris Mavroeidis	Nea Kifissia	196
4.	(United States) Toarlyn Fitzpatrick	Apollon Patras	190
5.	(Serbia) Nikola Marković	Panelefsiniakos	169

=== Assists ===
Pos	Player	Club	Total Assists
**1.**	(Greece) **Vassilis Spanoulis**	Olympiacos	**140**
2.	(Greece) Dimitris Diamantidis	Panathinaikos	133
3.	(Greece) Vassilis Xanthopoulos	Panionios	129
4.	(United States) Vincent Council	Rethymno	122
5.	(United States) Justin Ingram	Trikala	128

== Clubs in international competitions ==
Team	Competition	Result
Olympiacos	**EuroLeague**	Final Four, 2nd place
Panathinaikos	**EuroLeague**	Playoffs, Quarterfinals
PAOK	**EuroCup**	Last 32, 4th place

== See also ==
- 2014–15 Greek Basketball Cup
- 2014–15 Greek A2 Basket League (2nd tier)
