= Derby of the Eternal Enemies (basketball) =

Basketball derby between Olympiacos and Panathinaikos

Derby of the Eternal Enemies Ντέρμπι των αιωνίων αντιπάλων
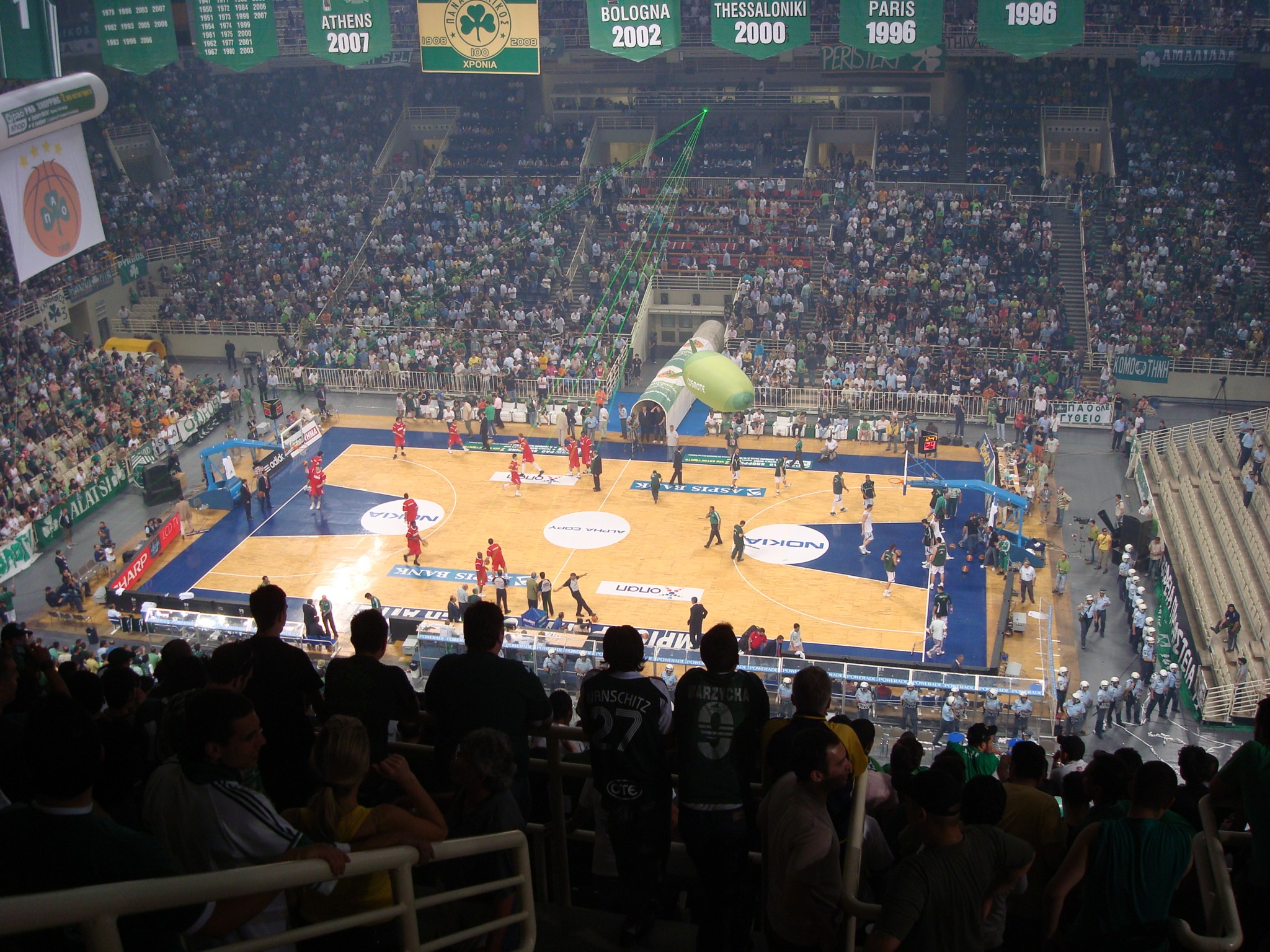
- View of the OAKA Basketball Arena during the 2008 Greek Basketball Championship final between Panathinaikos and Olympiacos
- Other names: Mother of all battles Μητέρα των μαχών
- Location: Athens / Piraeus, Greece
- Teams: Olympiacos, Panathinaikos
- First meeting: Panathinaikos vs Olympiacos 38–31, 22 April 1946 (Athens–Piraeus Championship)
- Latest meeting: Olympiacos vs Panathinaikos 89–85, 13 June 2026 (Greek League)
- Next meeting: Panathinaikos vs Olympiacos 11 December 2026 (EuroLeague)

Statistics
- Total meetings: 333
- Most wins: Panathinaikos (173)
- Largest victory: Panathinaikos vs Olympiacos 68–110, 1 June 1977 (Greek Cup)

The Derby of the Eternal Rivals (Greek: Ντέρμπι των αιωνίων αντιπάλων), also called Mother of All Battles (Greek: Μητέρα των μαχών), is the name of the basketball local derby in Attica (Piraeus and Athens) between Olympiacos and Panathinaikos. The Greek powerhouses have won a combined eleven EuroLeague titles since 1996, thus being among the most successful clubs in European basketball history. Panathinaikos basketball club has won seven EuroLeague titles and Olympiacos has won four EuroLeague titles. Their rivalry inside and outside the Greek borders is considered one of the most thrilling in the basketball world.

== History ==
=== Culture rivalry ===
The rivalry between the two top Greek clubs can be traced back to some social, cultural and regional differences. Panathinaikos comes from Athens and was considered the classic representative of the old Athenian society and culture. On the other hand, Olympiacos comes from Piraeus and used to represent the working class. However, this kind of clash was much more pronounced in the past, as the class differences between the fanbases have faded out and the social gap that once separated the two sides has closed over the years. Nowadays, both clubs boast fanbases that represent all the social classes.

=== Basketball rivalry ===
Panathinaikos and Olympiacos are two successful basketball teams in Greece. These two teams are long standing rivals and are successful clubs in Greek basketball. They have competed against each other at professional level for more years than any other teams in the country itself.

Their rivalry is highly credited, especially in the 1990s-2000s, when they met each other in several regular season and playoff series, and in some EuroLeague matches which marked their history.

Competition	Panathinaikos	Olympiacos
EuroLeague	7	4
Greek League	40	16
Greek Cup	22	12
Greek Super Cup	1	5
FIBA Intercontinental Cup	1	1
Total	71	38

== Statistics ==
=== Head-to-head ===
	Panathinaikos wins	Olympiacos wins
EuroLeague
At Panathinaikos home	4	9
At Olympiacos home	2	11
Neutral field	1	3
Total	7	23
Panhellenic Championship (1946 – 1963)
Neutral field	5	3
Total	5	3
Athens–Piraeus Championship
At Panathinaikos home	10	5
At Olympiacos home	5	10
Neutral field	2	0
Total	17	15
Alpha Ethniki (1963/64 – 1985/86)
At Panathinaikos home	15	6
At Olympiacos home	10	11
Neutral field	1	0
Total	26	17
A1 category EEC
At Panathinaikos home	3	4
At Olympiacos home	4	3
Neutral field	0	0
Total	7	7
A1 Ethniki (1986/87 – present)
At Panathinaikos home	66	20
At Olympiacos home	24	62
Total	90	82
Greek Cup
At Panathinaikos home	4	2
At Olympiacos home	7	1
Neutral field	10	7
Total	21	10
Greek Super Cup
Neutral field	0	3
Total	0	3
Total
	173	160

=== Records ===
- Record Basket League win
  - Panathinaikos: Panathinaikos - Olympiacos 86–55 (+31), Olympic Indoor Hall (13 February 2005)
    - home: Panathinaikos - Olympiacos 86–55 (+31), Olympic Indoor Hall (13 February 2005)
    - away: Olympiacos - Panathinaikos 75–95 (+20), Papastrateio Indoor Hall (1 November 1986)
  - Olympiacos: Olympiacos - Panathinaikos 73–38 (+35) Peace and Friendship Stadium (19 May 1996)
    - home: Olympiacos - Panathinaikos 73–38 (+35), Peace and Friendship Stadium (19 May 1996)
    - away: Panathinaikos - Olympiacos 35–63 (+28), Oaka Altion (15 June 2023)
- Record Greek Cup win
  - Panathinaikos: Olympiacos - Panathinaikos 51–81 (+30), Peace and Friendship Stadium (13 October 2005)
    - home: Panathinaikos- Olympiacos 85–72 (+13), Olympic Indoor Hall (21 February 1996)
    - away: Olympiacos - Panathinaikos 51–81 (+30), Peace and Friendship Stadium (13 October 2005)
  - Olympiacos: Panathinaikos - Olympiacos 68–110 (+42), Panathinaiko Stadium (1 June 1977)
    - home: Olympiacos - Panathinaikos 83–75 (+8), Peace and Friendship Stadium (5 April 2002)
    - away: Panathinaikos - Olympiacos 68–110 (+42), Panathinaiko Stadium (1 June 1977)
- Record EuroLeague win
  - Panathinaikos: Panathinaikos - Olympiacos 93–80 (+13), Olympic Indoor Hall (9 November 2018)
    - home: Panathinaikos - Olympiacos 93–80 (+13), Olympic Indoor Hall (9 November 2018)
    - away: Olympiacos - Panathinaikos 77–88 (+11), Peace and Friendship Stadium (5 February 2021)
  - Olympiacos: Olympiacos - Panathinaikos 101–73 (+28), Peace and Friendship Stadium (17 March 2022)
    - home: Olympiacos - Panathinaikos 101–73 (+28), Peace and Friendship Stadium (17 March 2022)
    - away: Panathinaikos - Olympiacos 71–95 (+24), Olympic Indoor Hall (30 December 2022)
- Longest sequence of Basket League wins
  - Panathinaikos: 5, 2005–06 to 2006–07
    - home: 13, 2006–07 to 2009–10
    - away: 3, 1982–83 to 1984–85
  - Olympiacos: 7, 2022 to 2023
    - home: 12, 1994–95 to 1998–99
    - away: 2, 1986–87 to 1988–89, 1990–91 to 1992–93, 2014 to 2015
- Longest sequence of Greek Cup wins
  - Panathinaikos: 6, 6 October 2003 – 22 February 2009
    - home: 4, 1996 – present
    - away: 5, 6 October 2003 – present
    - neutral: 3, 1978–79 to 1985–86
  - Olympiacos: 3, 14 July 1965 – 9 July 1969 and 3 May 1953 – 7 August 1960
    - home: 2, 1975 – 25 September 1994
    - away: 0
    - neutral: 2, 2009–10 to 2010–11

== Matches list ==
=== Panhellenic Championship (1928−1963) ===
	Neutral field		
Season	Date	Venue	Score
1928−1940	Panathinaikos and Olympiacos did not meet		
1941−1945	Not Held		
1946	Olympiacos did not compete		
1947			41–21
1948	Not Held		
1949	04–11–1949	Athens	67–45
1950	22–07–1950	Athens	33–22
1951	28–06–1951	Athens	53–33
1952	Not Held		
1953	01–06–1953	Athens	67–50
1954	06–07–1954	Athens	39–37
1955	22–09–1955	Athens	70–63
1956	Not Held		
1957	Panathinaikos did not compete		
1958	02–07–1958	Athens	72–59
1959	Panathinaikos did not compete		
1960	Panathinaikos did not compete		
1961	Olympiacos did not compete		
1962	Olympiacos did not compete		
1963	Olympiacos did not compete		

• Matches won: Panathinaikos 5, Olympiacos 3.

=== Alpha and A1 Ethniki (since 1963–64) ===
	Olympiacos – Panathinaikos			Panathinaikos – Olympiacos		
Season	Phase	Venue	Score	Phase	Venue	Score
1963–64	Reg. season		61–65	Reg. season		78–66
1964–65	There were no games due to the relegation of Olympiacos to the 2nd Division					
1965–66	There were no games due to the relegation of Olympiacos to the 2nd Division					
1966–67	There were no games due to the relegation of Olympiacos to the 2nd Division					
1967–68	Reg. season		58–62	Reg. season		75–69
1968–69	Reg. season	Panathinaiko Stadium	70–67	Reg. season	Panathinaiko Stadium	65–68
1969–70	Reg. season		59–60	Reg. season		74–78
1970–71	Reg. season		2–0	Reg. season		84–83
1971–72	Reg. season		71–65	Reg. season		67–63
1971–72	Playoff	Sporting Sports Arena	56–70			
1972–73	Reg. season		78–77	Reg. season		78–77
1973–74	Reg. season		72–83	Reg. season		64–53
1974–75	Reg. season		99–70	Reg. season		63–60
1975–76	Reg. season		101−74	Reg. season		65–72
1976–77	Reg. season		75–82	Reg. season		91–83
1977–78	Reg. season		94–79	Reg. season		77–81
1978–79	Reg. season		72–61	Reg. season		70–76
1979–80	1st Phase		89–95	1st Phase		89–81
1979–80	2nd Phase		83–87	2nd Phase		82–70
1980–81	Reg. season		87–83	Reg. season		80–75
1981–82	Reg. season		88–73	Reg. season		81–75
1982–83	Reg. season		78–88	Reg. season		76–77
1983–84	Reg. season		60–66	Reg. season		83–68
1984–85	Reg. season		67–68	Reg. season		106−84
1985–86	Reg. season		83–74	Reg. season		87–76
1986–87	Reg. season	Papastrateio Indoor Hall	75–95	Reg. season	Leoforos Alexandras Stadium	70–82
1987–88	Reg. season	Papastrateio Indoor Hall	76–85	Reg. season	Leoforos Alexandras Stadium	71–72
1988–89	Reg. season	Papastrateio Indoor Hall	86–70	Reg. season	Leoforos Alexandras Stadium	103−85
1989–90	Reg. season	Papastrateio Indoor Hall	89–97	Reg. season	Leoforos Alexandras Stadium	91–74
1990–91	Reg. season	Papastrateio Indoor Hall	110−94	Reg. season	Leoforos Alexandras Stadium	96–75
1990–91	Playoff	Papastrateio Indoor Hall	79–88	Playoff	Leoforos Alexandras Stadium	84–90
1991–92	Reg. season	Peace and Friendship	69–60	Reg. season	Leoforos Alexandras Stadium	81–84
1992–93	Reg. season	Peace and Friendship	78–76	Reg. season	Glyfada Indoor Hall	69–56
1992–93	Playoff	Peace and Friendship	89–74	Playoff	Glyfada Indoor Hall	62–51
1992–93	Playoff	Peace and Friendship	2–0^{1}	Playoff	Glyfada Indoor Hall	72–77
1993–94	Reg. season	Peace and Friendship	72–64	Reg. season	Glyfada Indoor Hall	66–60
1994–95	Reg. season	Peace and Friendship	72–74	Reg. season	Glyfada Indoor Hall	65–67
1994–95	Playoff	Peace and Friendship	82–66	Playoff	Glyfada Indoor Hall	71–55
1994–95	Playoff	Peace and Friendship	66–56	Playoff	Glyfada Indoor Hall	65–57
1994–95	Playoff	Peace and Friendship	45–44			
1995–96	Reg. season	Peace and Friendship	81–60	Reg. season	Olympic Indoor Hall	66–61
1995–96	Playoff	Peace and Friendship	67–63	Playoff	Olympic Indoor Hall	65–63
1995–96	Playoff	Peace and Friendship	72–65	Playoff	Olympic Indoor Hall	79–74
1995–96	Playoff	Peace and Friendship	73–38			
1996–97	Reg. season	Peace and Friendship	62–55	Reg. season	Olympic Indoor Hall	79–64
1997–98	Reg. season	Peace and Friendship	67–65	Reg. season	Olympic Indoor Hall	68–48
1998–99	Reg. season	Peace and Friendship	63–53	Reg. season	Olympic Indoor Hall	59–57
1998–99	Playoff	Peace and Friendship	71–69	Playoff	Olympic Indoor Hall	72–56
1998–99	Playoff	Peace and Friendship	64–47	Playoff	Olympic Indoor Hall	66–56
1998–99	Playoff	Peace and Friendship	53–62			
1999–00	Reg. season	Peace and Friendship	57–54	Reg. season	Olympic Indoor Hall	68–69
2000–01	Reg. season	Peace and Friendship	86–78	Reg. season	Olympic Indoor Hall	68–63
2000–01	Playoff	Peace and Friendship	88–84	Playoff	Olympic Indoor Hall	83–70
2000–01	Playoff	Peace and Friendship	80–74	Playoff	Olympic Indoor Hall	73–57
2000–01				Playoff	Olympic Indoor Hall	79–63
2001–02	Reg. season	Glyfada Indoor Hall	52–62^{2}	Reg. season	Olympic Indoor Hall	91–84
2001–02	Playoff	Peace and Friendship	80–76	Playoff	Olympic Indoor Hall	80–89
2002–03	Reg. season	Korydallos Indoor Hall	73–65	Reg. season	Sporting Sports Arena	85–76
2003–04	Reg. season	Korydallos Indoor Hall	55–57	Reg. season	Sporting Sports Arena	76–60
2003–04	Playoff	Korydallos Indoor Hall	68–73	Playoff	Sporting Sports Arena	79–76
2004–05	Reg. season	Peace and Friendship	81–74	Reg. season	Olympic Indoor Hall	86–55
2004–05	Playoff	Peace and Friendship	74–77	Playoff	Olympic Indoor Hall	95–77
2005–06	Reg. season	Peace and Friendship	84–77	Reg. season	Olympic Indoor Hall	90–71
2005–06	Playoff	Peace and Friendship	68–79	Playoff	Olympic Indoor Hall	82–76
2005–06				Playoff	Olympic Indoor Hall	82–70
2006–07	Reg. season	Peace and Friendship	73–74	Reg. season	Olympic Indoor Hall	84–89
2006–07	Playoff	Peace and Friendship	76–72	Playoff	Olympic Indoor Hall	79–72
2006–07	Playoff	Peace and Friendship	78–68	Playoff	Olympic Indoor Hall	86–85
2006–07				Playoff	Olympic Indoor Hall	89–76
2007–08	Reg. season	Peace and Friendship	64–82	Reg. season	Olympic Indoor Hall	81–77
2007–08	Playoff	Peace and Friendship	71–55	Playoff	Olympic Indoor Hall	83–79
2007–08	Playoff	Peace and Friendship	59–57	Playoff	Olympic Indoor Hall	78–67
2007–08				Playoff	Olympic Indoor Hall	90–76
2008–09	Reg. season	Peace and Friendship	77–75	Reg. season	Olympic Indoor Hall	86–69
2008–09	Playoff	Peace and Friendship	67–69	Playoff	Olympic Indoor Hall	91–64
2008–09	Playoff	Peace and Friendship	74–70	Playoff	Olympic Indoor Hall	94–81
2009–10	Reg. season	Peace and Friendship	87–76	Reg. season	Olympic Indoor Hall	98–90
2009–10	Playoff	Peace and Friendship	79–72	Playoff	Olympic Indoor Hall	73–54
2009–10	Playoff	Peace and Friendship	0–20^{3}	Playoff	Olympic Indoor Hall	79–70
2010–11	Reg. season	Peace and Friendship	87–83	Reg. season	Olympic Indoor Hall	61–65
2010–11	Playoff	Peace and Friendship	70–75	Playoff	Olympic Indoor Hall	78–66
2010–11	Playoff	Peace and Friendship	76–68	Playoff	Olympic Indoor Hall	101−94
2011–12	Reg. season	Peace and Friendship	78–77	Reg. season	Olympic Indoor Hall	74–70
2011–12	Playoff	Peace and Friendship	84–78	Playoff	Olympic Indoor Hall	81–79
2011–12	Playoff	Peace and Friendship	84–72	Playoff	Olympic Indoor Hall	84−74
2011–12	Playoff	Peace and Friendship	82–76			
2012–13	Reg. season	Peace and Friendship	72–67	Reg. season	Olympic Indoor Hall	60–64
2012–13	Playoff	Peace and Friendship	51–64	Playoff	Olympic Indoor Hall	63–52
2012–13	Playoff	Peace and Friendship	0–20^{4}			
2013–14	Reg. season	Peace and Friendship	55–45	Reg. season	Olympic Indoor Hall	58–48
2013–14	Playoff	Peace and Friendship	89–64	Playoff	Olympic Indoor Hall	59–56
2013–14	Playoff	Peace and Friendship	65–67	Playoff	Olympic Indoor Hall	64–69
2013–14				Playoff	Olympic Indoor Hall	82−71
2014–15	Reg. season	Peace and Friendship	81–75	Reg. season	Olympic Indoor Hall	66–77
2014–15	Playoff	Peace and Friendship	76–70	Playoff	Olympic Indoor Hall	69–76
2014–15	Playoff	Peace and Friendship	93–74			
2015–16	Reg. season	Peace and Friendship	80–66	Reg. season	Olympic Indoor Hall	73–69
2015–16	Playoff	Peace and Friendship	81–83	Playoff	Olympic Indoor Hall	66–68
2015–16	Playoff	Peace and Friendship	77–72	Playoff	Olympic Indoor Hall	81–82
2016–17	Reg. season	Peace and Friendship	88–63	Reg. season	Olympic Indoor Hall	72–59
2016–17	Playoff	Peace and Friendship	63–58	Playoff	Olympic Indoor Hall	84–80
2016–17	Playoff	Peace and Friendship	64–62	Playoff	Olympic Indoor Hall	71–58
2016–17	Playoff	Peace and Friendship	51–66			
2017–18	Reg. season	Peace and Friendship	68–71	Reg. season	Olympic Indoor Hall	68–61
2017–18	Playoff	Peace and Friendship	66–71	Playoff	Olympic Indoor Hall	65–75
2017–18	Playoff	Peace and Friendship	92–76	Playoff	Olympic Indoor Hall	73–58
2017–18				Playoff	Olympic Indoor Hall	84–70
2018–19	Reg. season	Peace and Friendship	0–20^{5}	Reg. season	Olympic Indoor Hall	79–70
2018–19	Playoff	Peace and Friendship	0–20^{7}	Playoff	Olympic Indoor Hall	20–0^{6}
2019–20	There were no games due to the relegation of Olympiacos to the 2nd Division					
2020–21	There were no games due to the relegation of Olympiacos to the 2nd Division					
2021–22	Reg. season	Peace and Friendship	76–81	Reg. season	Olympic Indoor Hall	62–68
2021–22	Playoff	Peace and Friendship	74–61	Playoff	Olympic Indoor Hall	72–78
2021–22	Playoff	Peace and Friendship	93–74			
2022–23	Reg. season	Peace and Friendship	68–66	Reg. season	Olympic Indoor Hall	74–76
2022–23	Playoff	Peace and Friendship	73–70	Playoff	Olympic Indoor Hall	67–65
2022–23	Playoff	Peace and Friendship	75–52	Playoff	Olympic Indoor Hall	35–63
2023–24	Reg. season	Peace and Friendship	54–66	Reg. season	Olympic Indoor Hall	85–80
2023–24				Reg. season	Olympic Indoor Hall	77–71
2023–24	Playoff	Peace and Friendship	92–86	Playoff	Olympic Indoor Hall	84–89
2023–24	Playoff	Peace and Friendship	85–88	Playoff	Olympic Indoor Hall	83–76
2023–24				Playoff	Olympic Indoor Hall	87–82
2024–25	Reg. season	Peace and Friendship	71–78	Reg. season	Olympic Indoor Hall	78–72
2024–25	Playoff	Peace and Friendship	91–83	Playoff	Olympic Indoor Hall	80–68
2024–25	Playoff	Peace and Friendship	85–71	Playoff	Olympic Indoor Hall	88–99
2025–26	Reg. season	Peace and Friendship	90–86	Reg. season	Olympic Indoor Hall	94–101
2025–26	Playoff	Peace and Friendship	82–76	Playoff	Olympic Indoor Hall	68–58
2025–26	Playoff	Peace and Friendship	102–92	Playoff	Olympic Indoor Hall	93–86
2025–26	Playoff	Peace and Friendship	89–85			

^{1} Panathinaikos didn't show up in the match, so Olympiacos were awarded a 2–0 win.
^{2} Match suspended with 2 minutes remaining in the third quarter due to crowd violence (score: 52–62). Panathinaikos were awarded the win with the score standing.
^{3} Match suspended with 1:03 remaining in the final quarter due to crowd violence (score: 69–76). Panathinaikos were awarded a 0–20 win.
^{4} Match suspended with 1:27 remaining in the final quarter due to crowd violence (score: 72–76). Panathinaikos were awarded a 0–20 win.
^{5} Olympiacos didn't show up in the match, so Panathinaikos were awarded a 0–20 win.
^{6} Olympiacos didn't show up in the match, so Panathinaikos were awarded a 20–0 win.
^{7} Olympiacos didn't show up in the match, so Panathinaikos were awarded a 0–20 win.
• Matches won: Panathinaikos 123, Olympiacos 106. (Reg. season 67–55, Playoff 56–51)

=== Greek Cup ===
		Olympiacos home			Panathinaikos home			Neutral field		
Season	Round	Date	Venue	Score	Date	Venue	Score	Date	Venue	Score
1975–76	Round of 32				14–06–1976	A. Nikolaidis Indoor Hall	60–64			
1976–77	Round of 32				01–06–1977	Panathinaiko Stadium	68–110			
1978–79	Final							02–06–1979	Panathinaiko Stadium	79–72
1979–80	Quarter Final	04–07–1980	Panathinaiko Stadium	62–60						
1982–83	Final							20–04–1983	Glyfada Indoor Hall	72–62
1985–86	Final							23–04–1986	Peace and Fr. Stadium	88–78
1994–95	2nd Round	25–09–1994	Sporting Sports Arena	40–42						
1995–96	Quarter Final				21–02–1996	Olympic Indoor Hall	85–72			
1997–98	3rd place							01–02–1998	Alexandreio Melathron	80–56
2000–01	Semifinal				28–04–2001	Olympic Indoor Hall	79–69			
2001–02	Semifinal	05–04–2002	Peace and Fr. Stadium	83–75						
2002–03	Quarter Final	06–10–2002	Korydallos Indoor Hall	65–73						
2004–05	Round of 16	03–10–2004	Peace and Fr. Stadium	45–57						
2005–06	Quarter Final	13–10–2005	Peace and Fr. Stadium	51–81						
2006–07	Round of 16	27–09–2006	Peace and Fr. Stadium	71–79						
2007–08	Final							26–03–2008	Helliniko Olympic Arena	81–79
2008–09	Final							22–02–2009	Helliniko Olympic Arena	80–70
2009–10	Final							20–02–2010	Helliniko Olympic Arena	68–64
2010–11	Final							15–05–2011	Helliniko Olympic Arena	74–68
2011–12	Final							10–03–2012	Helliniko Olympic Arena	71–70
2012–13	Final							10–02–2013	Helliniko Olympic Arena	81–78
2013–14	Semifinal				23–12–2013	Olympic Indoor Hall	67–59			
2014–15	Quarter final				09–10–2014	Olympic Indoor Hall	77–76			
2015–16	Quarter final	08–10–2015	Peace and Fr. Stadium	64-70						
2016–17	Semifinal	16–01–2017	Peace and Fr. Stadium	67–77						
2018–19	Semifinal				13–02–2019	Olympic Indoor Hall	20–0^{1}			
2021–22	Final							20–02–2022	Heraklion Arena	73–81
2022–23	Semifinal							18–02–2023	Heraklion Arena	81–65
2023–24	Final							18–02–2024	Heraklion Arena	58–69
2024–25	Final							16–02–2025	Heraklion Arena	79–75
2025–26	Final							21–02–2026	Heraklion Arena	79–68

^{1} Panathinaikos won the Greek Cup semifinal (20–0), after Olympiacos decided to forfeit the game in protest at refereeing decisions.

• Matches won: Panathinaikos 21, Olympiacos 10.

=== Greek Super Cup ===
		Olympiacos home			Panathinaikos home			Neutral field		
Season	Round	Date	Venue	Score	Date	Venue	Score	Date	Venue	Score
2022–23	Final							02–10–2022	Kallithea Indoor Hall	67–52
2023–24	Final							30–09–2023	Kallithea Indoor Hall	75–51
2024–25	Final							29–09–2024	Kallithea Indoor Hall	86–85

• Matches won: Olympiacos 3, Panathinaikos 0.

=== Euroleague ===
		Olympiacos home			Panathinaikos home			Neutral field		
Season	Round	Date	Venue	Score	Date	Venue	Score	Date	Venue	Score
1993–94	Semifinal							19–04–1994	Yad Eliyahu Arena	77–72
1994–95	Semifinal							11–04–1995	Príncipe Felipe Arena	58–52
1996–97	Quarter Final	01–04–1997	Peace and Fr. Stadium	65–57	27–03–1997	Olympic Indoor Hall	49–69			
2001–02	Top 16	28–02–2002	Peace and Fr. Stadium	92–75	28–03–2002	Olympic Indoor Hall	88–78			
2008–09	Semifinal							01–05–2009	Berlin O2 World	84–82
2013–14	Top 16	10–04–2014	Peace and Fr. Stadium	68–65	20–02–2014	Olympic Indoor Hall	66–62			
2016–17	Reg. Season	06–01–2017	Peace and Fr. Stadium	77–69	18–11–2016	Olympic Indoor Hall	77–79			
2017–18	Reg. Season	10–11–2017	Peace and Fr. Stadium	62-70	02–03–2018	Olympic Indoor Hall	85–87			
2018–19	Reg. Season	04–01–2019	Peace and Fr. Stadium	79–65	09–11–2018	Olympic Indoor Hall	93–80			
2019–20	Reg. Season	03–03–2020	Peace and Fr. Stadium	81–78	06–12–2019	Olympic Indoor Hall	99–93			
2020–21	Reg. Season	05–02–2021	Peace and Fr. Stadium	77–88	09–10–2020	Olympic Indoor Hall	71–78			
2021–22	Reg. Season	17–03–2022	Peace and Fr. Stadium	101–73	23–12–2021	Olympic Indoor Hall	65–84			
2022–23	Reg. Season	31–03–2023	Peace and Fr. Stadium	81–73	30–12–2022	Olympic Indoor Hall	71–95			
2023–24	Reg. Season	14–03–2024	Peace and Fr. Stadium	71–65	06–10–2023	Olympic Indoor Hall	78–88			
2024–25	Reg. Season	14–03–2025	Peace and Fr. Stadium	76–74	08–11–2024	Olympic Indoor Hall	89–94			
2024–25	Third place game							25–05–2025	Etihad Arena	97–93
2025–26	Reg. Season	06–03–2026	Peace and Fr. Stadium	86–80	02–01–2026	Olympic Indoor Hall	82–87			
2026–27	Reg. Season	12–02–2027	Peace and Fr. Stadium		11–12–2026	Olympic Indoor Hall				

• Matches won: Olympiacos 23, Panathinaikos 7.

== Head-to-head ranking ==
Pl.	64	65	66	67	68	69	70	71	72	73	74	75	76	77	78	79	80	81	82	83	84	85	86	87	88	89	90	91	92	93	94	95	96	97	98	99	00	01	02	03	04	05	06	07	08	09	10	11	12	13	14	15	16	17	18	19	20	21	22	23	24	25	26	27
1				1		1		1	1	1	1	1	1	1	1		1	1	1		1									1	1	1	1	1	1	1	1	1		1	1	1	1	1	1	1	1	1	1	1	1	1	1	1	1	1	1	1	1	1	1	1	1	
2					2		2		2	2		2		2	2	2	2	2		2			2						2	2		2	2			2		2	2				2	2	2	2	2	2	2	2	2	2	2	2	2				2	2	2	2	2	
3	3		3										3			3						3				3					3				3		3		3																									
4					4			4															4	4																4																								
5						5	5													5					5		5							5																														
6		6									6								6						6																																							
7																					7	7		7		7	7	7																																				
8																												8	8												8	8																						
9																																																																
10	10																																																															
11																																																																
12																																																																
13																																																																
14																																																								14								
A2																																																									A2	A2						

• Total: Panathinaikos 45 times higher, Olympiacos 18 times higher.

== Players in both clubs ==
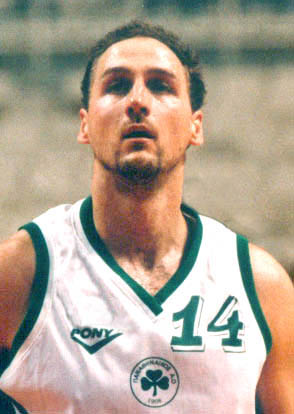
Dino Radja

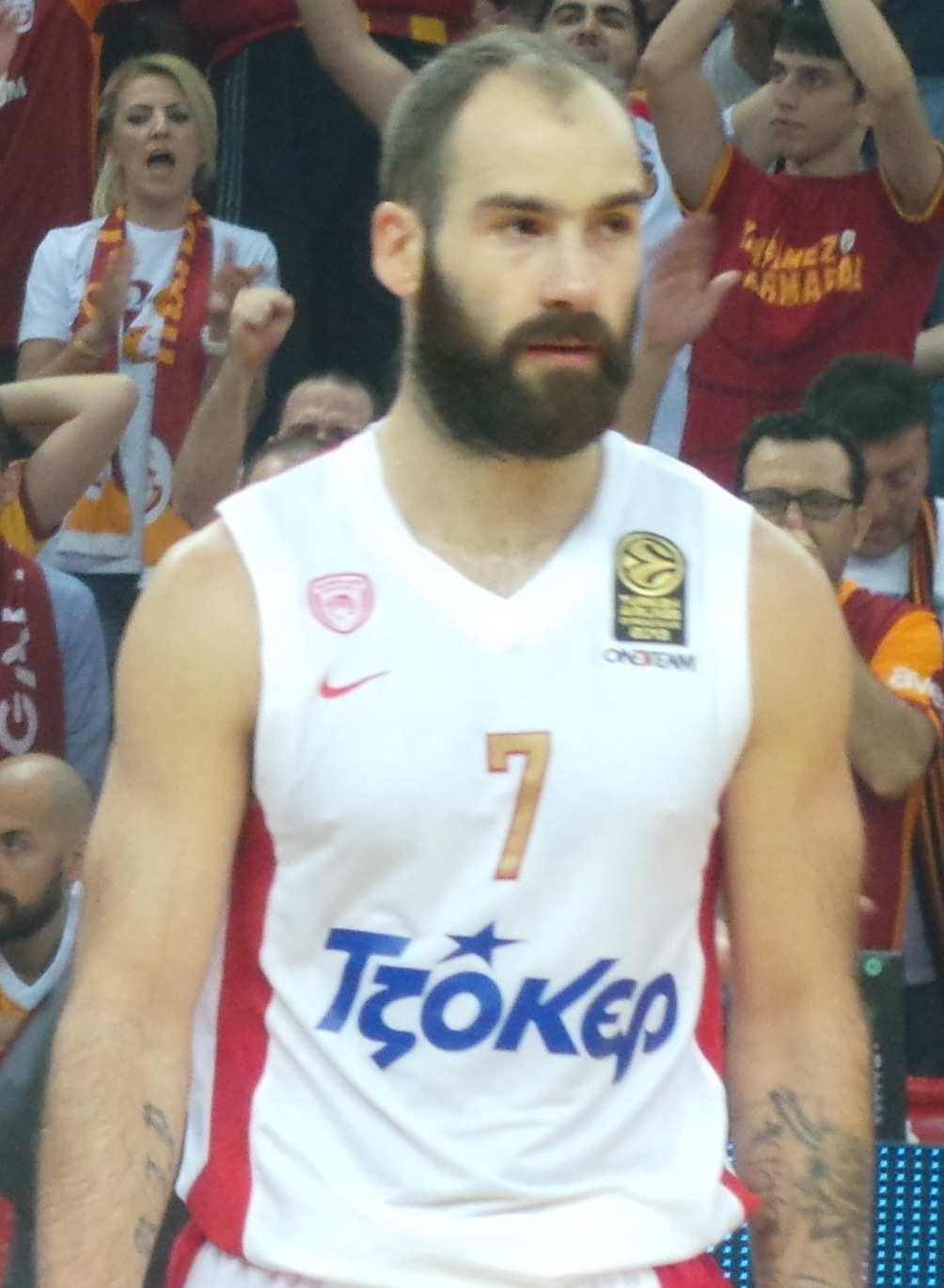
Vassilis Spanoulis

- (Greece) Petros Dimitropoulos
- (Greece) Christos Iordanidis
- (Greece) Giorgos Skropolithas
- (Greece) Nikos Darivas
- (Greece) Alexandros Anthis
- (Greece) Nikos Boudouris
- (Greece) Nikos Oikonomou
- (Greece) Dimitrios Papanikolaou
- (Greece) Vassilis Xanthopoulos
- (Greece) Andreas Glyniadakis
- (Greece) Ian Vougioukas
- (Greece) Vassilis Spanoulis
- (Greece) Lazaros Papadopoulos
- (Greece) Sofoklis Schortsanitis
- (Greece) Charis Giannopoulos
- (Greece) Stratos Perperoglou
- (Greece) Loukas Mavrokefalidis
- (Greece) Ioannis Bourousis
- (Greece) Paris Maragkos
- (Greece) Vassilis Charalampopoulos
- (Greece) Georgios Bogris
- (Greece) Ioannis Papapetrou
- (Greece) Antonis Koniaris
- (Greece) Ioannis Athinaiou
- (Greece) Michalis Lountzis
- (Greece) Vassilis Kavvadas
- (Greece) Dimitrios Agravanis
- (Greece) Kostas Sloukas
- (Greece) Vassilis Toliopoulos
- (Greece) Kostas Antetokounmpo
- (Federal Republic of Yugoslavia) Žarko Paspalj
- (Ukraine) Alexander Volkov
- (Croatia) Arijan Komazec
- (Croatia) Dino Rađa
- (Croatia) Damir Mulaomerović
- (Croatia) Andrija Žižić
- (United States) (Spain) Johnny Rogers
- (Germany) Patrick Femerling
- (Georgia (country)) Giorgi Shermadini
- (United States) (Belgium) Matt Lojeski
- (Argentina) Luca Vildoza
- (France) Moustapha Fall

== Coaches in both clubs ==
- (Greece) Mimis Stefanidis
- (Greece) Kostas Mourouzis
- (Greece) Kostas Anastasatos
- (Greece) Michalis Kyritsis (also was player in Panathinaikos)
- (Slovenia) (Greece) Lefteris Subotić
- (Serbia) Milan Minić (assistant coach and coach in Olympiacos, assistant coach in Panathinaikos)
- (Greece) Thanasis Papachatzis (assistant coach)

== Played for one club and coached the rival club ==
- (Greece) Faidon Matthaiou (Panathinaikos as player, Olympiacos as coach)
- (Greece) Panagiotis Giannakis (Panathinaikos as player, Olympiacos as coach)

== See also ==
- Derby of the Eternal Enemies
