= 2014–15 Greek Basketball Cup =

Greek Basketball Cup
- Season: 2014–15
- Duration: September 21, 2014 – April 5, 2015
- Teams: 28

Finals
- Champions: Panathinaikos (16th title)
- Runners-up: Apollon Patras
- Finals MVP: (Greece) Loukas Mavrokefalidis

The 2014–15 Greek Basketball Cup competition was the 40th edition of the top-tier level professional national domestic basketball cup competition of Greece. The competition started on September 21, 2014, and ended on April 5, 2015.

Panathinaikos beat Apollon Patras by a score of 53–68 in the Greek Cup Finals, to win its fourth straight cup title, and 16th cup title overall. Panathinaikos' Loukas Mavrokefalidis was named the Greek Basketball Cup Most Valuable Player.

== Format ==
The top six placed teams from the top-tier level Greek Basket League 2013–14 season had an automatic bye to the quarterfinals. While the eight lower placed teams from the Greek Basket League 2013–14 season, along with the 14 teams from the 2nd-tier level Greek A2 Basket League 2014–15 season, played in preliminary rounds, competing for the other two quarterfinals places. The quarterfinals and onward rounds were played under a single elimination format.

== Bracket ==
Quarterfinals
Nea Kifissia | 73
Aris | 69
Panionios | 63
Apollon Patras | 81
PAOK | 88
KAOD | 63
Panathinaikos | 77
Olympiacos | 76

Semifinals
Nea Kifissia | 73
Apollon Patras | 75
PAOK | 68
Panathinaikos | 71

Final
Apollon Patras | 53
Panathinaikos | 68

== Quarterfinals ==
October 8, 2014

| PAOK | 88–63 | KAOD |

PAOK Sports Arena, Thessaloniki

October 9, 2014

| Nea Kifissia | 73–69 | Aris |

Zirineio Indoor Hall, Kifissia, Athens

October 9, 2014

| Panionios | 63–81 | Apollon Patras |

Nea Smyrni Indoor Hall, Nea Smyrni, Athens

October 9, 2014

| Panathinaikos | 77–76 | Olympiacos |

OAKA Indoor Hall, Marousi, Athens

== Semifinals ==
December 20, 2014

| Nea Kifissia | 73–75 | Apollon Patras |

Zirineio Indoor Hall, Kifissia, Athens

February 22, 2015

| PAOK | 68–71 | Panathinaikos |

PAOK Sports Arena, Thessaloniki

== Final ==
April 5, 2015
20:30

| Apollon Patras | 53–68 | Panathinaikos |
Scoring by quarter: 12–21, 8–18, 11–18, 22–11
| Pts: Fitzpatrick 19 | | Pts: Mavrokefalidis 13 |

OAKA Indoor Hall, Marousi, Athens

| Apollon Patras | Panathinaikos |

2014–15 Greek Basketball Cup Finals
40th Final
5 April 2015 - OAKA

Panathinaikos - Apollon Patras 68–53 (39–20), Quarters: 21–12, 39–20, 57–31, 68–53. Referees: Somos, Tavoulari, Mitsopoulos

Panathinaikos (Ivanović): Mavrokefalidis 13, Diamantidis 9, Pappas 9, Batista 9, Fotsis 6, Gist 6, Janković 4, Slaughter 3, Bochoridis 3, Diamantakos 3, Charalampopoulos 3, Lountzis.

Apollon Patras (Vetoulas): Fitzpatrick 19, Argyropoulos 9, Niforas 7, Skordilis 5, Penn 5, El Amin 4, Batis 2, Pelekoudas 2, Galloway, Molfetas, Georgallis, Ojo.

MVP
(Greece) Loukas Mavrokefalidis
Game rules
Game was played under FIBA rules.

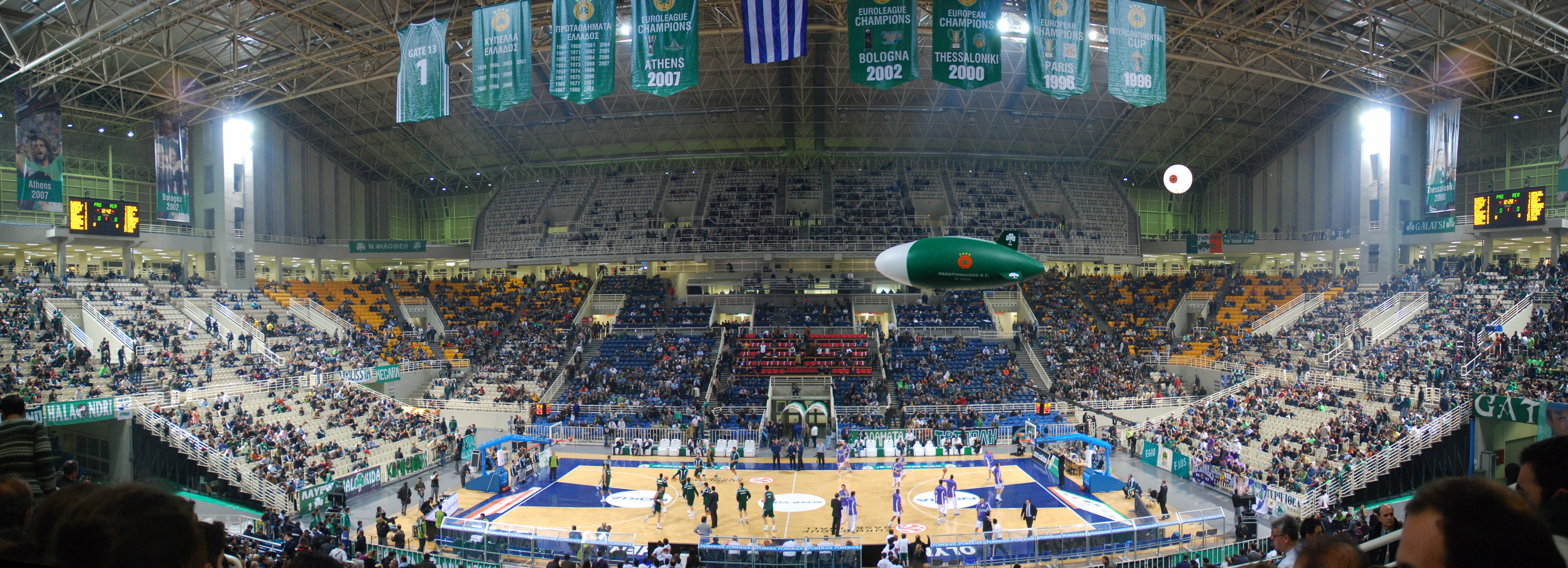
OAKA Indoor Hall

2015 Greek Cup Winners
Panathinaikos
(16th title)

== Awards ==
=== Most Valuable Player ===
| Player | Team |
|---|---|
| (Greece) Loukas Mavrokefalidis | Panathinaikos |

=== Finals Top Scorer ===
| Player | Team |
|---|---|
| (United States) Toarlyn Fitzpatrick | Apollon Patras |
