= Katsoulis =

Katsoulis is a surname. Notable people with the surname include:

- Manthos Katsoulis
- Giorgos Katsoulis
- Zaharias Katsoulis
- Nick Katsoulis
