= 1939–40 Greek Football Cup =

1939–40 Greek Cup
Tournament details
- Country: Greece
- Teams: 73

Final positions
- Champions: Panathinaikos (1st title)
- Runners-up: Aris

Tournament statistics
- Matches played: 78
- Goals scored: 296 (3.79 per match)

The 1939–40 Greek Football Cup was the fourth edition of the Greek Football Cup. The competition culminated with the Greek Cup Final, held at Leoforos Alexandras Stadium, on 2 June 1940. The match was contested by Panathinaikos and Aris, with Panathinaikos winning by 3–1.

== Calendar ==
Round	Date(s)	Fixtures	Clubs	New entries
First Round	19 November 1939	20	73 → 53	65
Second Round		14	53 → 39	none
Third Round		12	39 → 27	none
Fourth Round		7	27 → 20	none
Fifth Round		4	20 → 17	none
Sixth Round		1	17 → 16	none
Round of 16		9	16 → 8	8
Quarter-finals		6	8 → 4	none
Semi-finals		4	4 → 2	none
Final	2 June 1940	1	2 → 1	none

== Qualification round ==
=== First round ===
Team 1	Score	Team 2
Athens Football Clubs Association
Olympias Athens	2–1	Olympiacos Athens
Arion Kolonaki	1–0	Attikos
A.O. Kifisia	1–0 (a.e.t.)	Panerythraikos
Ilisiakos	3–8	Mirkasiatiki Athens
Atlas Thymarakia	1–5	AE Ierapolis
Dapfni Athens	bye	
Atromitos	bye	
Asteras Athens	bye	
Athinaikos	bye	
AE Pangrati	bye	
Piraeus Football Clubs Association
Panelefsiniakos	3–2	Atromitos Piraeus
AEK Piraeus	3–7	Amyna Piraeus
Keramikos	bye	
E.F. Neapoli	bye	
Argonaftis Piraeus	bye	
Aris Piraeus	bye	
Thiseas Piraeus	bye	
Proodeftiki	bye	
Macedonia Football Clubs Association
Aetos Papafi	2–3 (a.e.t.)	Olympiacos Terpsithea
Armeniki Enosi	2–6	Ethnikos Kamaras
Makedonikos	bye	
MENT	bye	
Hellas Florina	bye	
Patras Football Clubs Association
Panegialios	2–4 (a.e.t.)	Apollon Patras
Iraklis Patra	2–4	Ethnikos Patra
Achilleus Patra	1–2	Aris Patra
Panachaiki	bye	
Olympiakos Patras	bye	
Ethnikos Aigio	bye	
Asteras Patra	bye	
Thessaly Football Clubs Association
Iraklis Volos	5–1	Odysseus Volos
PAEK	0–2^{*}	Kentavros Volos
Olympiacos Volos	bye	
Niki Volos	bye	
Apollon Volos	bye	
Crete Football Clubs Association
Ergotelis	3–2	OFI
EGOH	bye	
Central-Eastern Macedonia Football Clubs Association
Apollon Serres	1–5	Ethnikos Sidirokastro
AEK Kavala	5–1	Aris Drama
Doxa Drama	3–2 (a.e.t.)	Elpis Drama
Iraklis Serres	bye	
Iraklis Kavalas	bye	
Filipi Kavala	bye	
Thrace Football Clubs Association
AE Komotini	5–1	AE Alexandroupoli
Aspida Xanthi	3–2	AE Xanthi

=== Second round ===
Team 1	Score	Team 2
Athens Football Clubs Association
AE Ierapolis	1–0	Mirkasiatiki Athens
Arion Kolonaki	?	A.O. Kifisia
Olympias Athens	bye	
Dapfni Athens	bye	
Atromitos	bye	
Asteras Athens	bye	
Athinaikos	bye	
AE Pangrati	bye	
Piraeus Football Clubs Association
Panelefsiniakos	2–1	Amyna Piraeus
Keramikos	7–3	E.F. Neapoli
Argonaftis Piraeus	bye	
Aris Piraeus	bye	
Thiseas Piraeus	bye	
Proodeftiki	bye	
Macedonia Football Clubs Association
Olympiacos Terpsithea	2–3	Ethnikos Kamaras
Makedonikos	bye	
MENT	bye	
Hellas Florina	bye	
Patras Football Clubs Association
Panachaiki	2–1	Apollon Patras
Olympiakos Patras	1–0	Aris Patra
Ethnikos Aigio	1–5	Ethnikos Patra
Asteras Patra	bye	
Thessaly Football Clubs Association
Niki Volos	2–0^{**} (w/o)	Apollon Volos
Olympiacos Volos	bye	
Kentavros Volos	bye	
Iraklis Volos	bye	
Crete Football Clubs Association
Ergotelis	?	EGOH
Central-Eastern Macedonia Football Clubs Association
Iraklis Serres	9–0	Ethnikos Sidirokastro
AEK Kavala	?	Iraklis Kavalas
Doxa Drama	1–0	Filipi Kavala
Thrace Football Clubs Association
Aspida Xanthi	1–0	AE Komotini

=== Third round ===
Team 1	Score	Team 2
Athens Football Clubs Association
Olympias Athens	0–1	Arion Kolonaki
AE Ierapolis	bye	
Dapfni Athens	bye	
Atromitos	bye	
Asteras Athens	bye	
Athinaikos	bye	
AE Pangrati	bye	
Piraeus Football Clubs Association
Panelefsiniakos	7–0	Argonaftis Piraeus
Keramikos	4–3	Aris Piraeus
Thiseas Piraeus	?	Proodeftiki
Macedonia Football Clubs Association
Makedonikos	3–1	Ethnikos Kamaras
MENT	3–0	Hellas Florina
Patras Football Clubs Association
Panachaiki	4–1	Ethnikos Patra
Olympiakos Patras	2–1	Asteras Patra
Thessaly Football Clubs Association
Olympiacos Volos	9–1	Iraklis Volos
Niki Volos	6–3	Kentavros Volos
Thrace/Central-Eastern Macedonia Football Clubs Association
Iraklis Serres	?	Iraklis Kavalas
Doxa Drama	3–0	Aspida Xanthi

=== Fourth round ===
Team 1	Score	Team 2
Athens Football Clubs Association
Dapfni Athens	1–0	AE Ierapolis
Atromitos	1–0 (a.e.t.)	Arion Kolonaki
Athinaikos	2–1	Asteras Athens
AE Pangrati	bye	
Piraeus Football Clubs Association
Keramikos	3–2	Panelefsiniakos
Proodeftiki	bye	
Macedonia Football Clubs Association
Makedonikos	0–1	MENT
Patras Football Clubs Association
Panachaiki	1–2	Olympiakos Patras
Thessaly Football Clubs Association
Niki Volos	0–2	Olympiacos Volos

=== Fifth round ===
Team 1	Score/Agg.	Team 2	Match	Replay
Athens Football Clubs Association
AE Pangrati	5–2	Athinaikos		
Dapfni Athens	1–0	Atromitos		
Piraeus Football Clubs Association
Keramikos	1–4	Proodeftiki	0–0 (a.e.t.)	1–4

=== Sixth round ===
Team 1	Score	Team 2
Athens Football Clubs Association
AE Pangrati	1–0 (a.e.t.)	Dapfni Athens

^{*} The match was suspended at the 70th minute due to player incidends. That remained as the final score

^{**} Apollon Volos won 1–2 after extra time, but Niki Volos put an objection for illegal use of a player of Apollon and were awarded the match.

== Knockout phase ==
In the knockout phase, teams play against each other over a single match. If the match ends up as a draw, extra time will be played and if the match remains a draw a replay match is set at the home of the guest team which the extra time rule stands as well. That procedure will be repeated until a winner occurs.
The mechanism of the draws for each round is as follows:

- In the draw for the round of 16, the eight top teams of each association are seeded and the eight clubs that passed the qualification round are unseeded.
  The seeded teams are drawn against the unseeded teams.
- In the draws for the quarter-finals onwards, there are no seedings, and teams from the same group can be drawn against each other.

== Bracket ==
Round of 16
Panathinaikos	6
Iraklis Serres	1
Ethnikos Heraklion	0
Apollon Athens (w/o)	2
Olympiacos Patra	1
Ethnikos Piraeus	2
Olympiacos	4
MENT	2
PAOK	3
AE Pangrati	0
Doxa Drama	1	2
Aris	1	4
AEK Athens	5
Proodeftiki	1
Olympiacos Volos	3
Iraklis	1

Quarter-finals
Panathinaikos	1	4
Apollon Athens	1	1
Ethnikos Piraeus	1
Olympiacos	0
PAOK	1	1
Aris	1	2
AEK Athens	5
Olympiacos Volos	1

Semi-finals
Panathinaikos	1
Ethnikos Piraeus	0
Aris	2	3
AEK Athens	2	0

Final
Panathinaikos	3
Aris	1

== Round of 16 ==
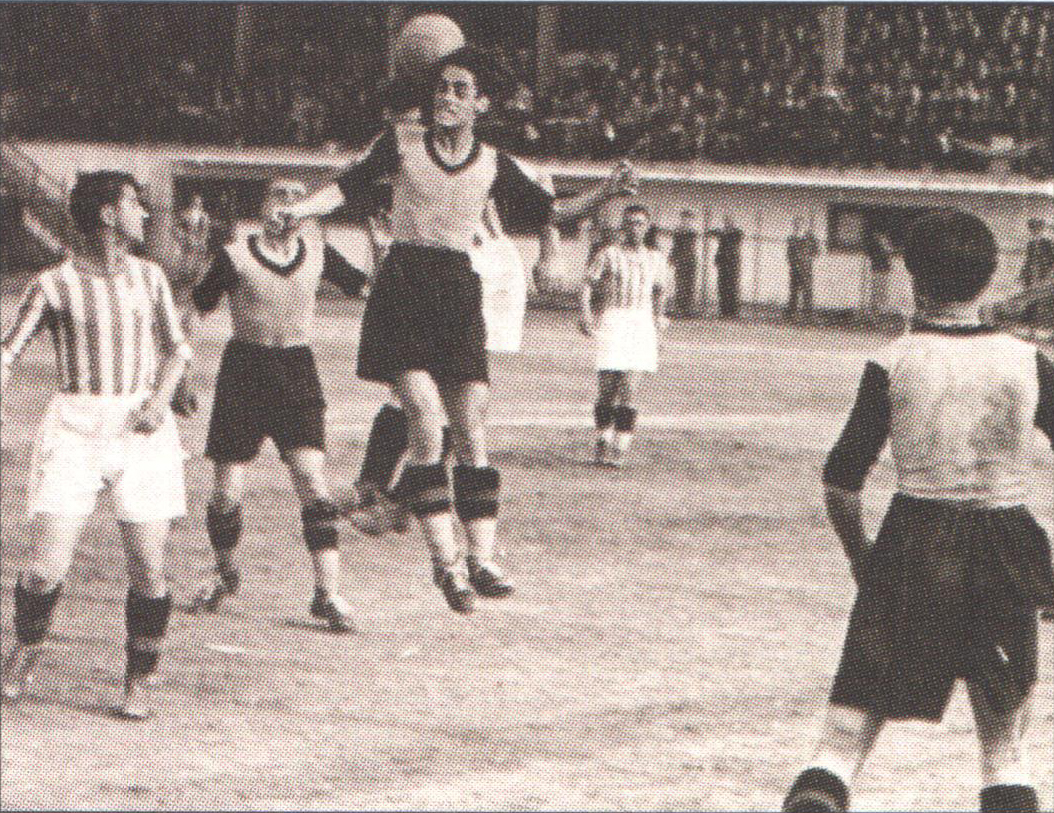
Panathinaikos and Aris during the final

Team 1	Score/Agg.	Team 2	Match	Replay
Olympiacos	4–2	MENT		
Panathinaikos	6–1	Iraklis Serres		
Doxa Drama	3–5	Aris	1–1 (a.e.t.)	2–4
AEK Athens	5–1	Proodeftiki		
PAOK	3–0	AE Pangrati		
Olympiacos Volos	3–1	Iraklis		
Olympiacos Patra	1–2	Ethnikos Piraeus		
Ethnikos Heraklion	0–2 (w/o)	Apollon Athens		

== Quarter-finals ==
Team 1	Score/Agg.	Team 2	Match	Replay
PAOK	2–3	Aris	1–1 (a.e.t.)	1–2
Ethnikos Piraeus	1–0	Olympiacos		
Panathinaikos	5–2	Apollon Athens	1–1 (a.e.t.)	4–1
AEK Athens	5–1	Olympiacos Volos		

== Semi-finals ==
Team 1	Score/Agg.	Team 2	Match	Replay
Panathinaikos	1–0	Ethnikos Piraeus		
Aris	5–2	AEK Athens	2–2 (a.e.t.)	3–0

== Final ==
2 June 1940
17:00 EET

Panathinaikos	3–1	Aris
Baltasis 9' (pen.); Triantafyllis 10'; Migiakis 13'	Report	Chatzinikolaou 61'

Leoforos Alexandras Stadium, Athens
Referee: Vasilis Diamantopoulos (Athens)
