= Gerasimos Tzakis =

Greek–Romanian basketball player

Personal information
- Born: September 17, 1966 (age 60) Bucharest, Romania
- Listed height: 6 ft 0.5 in (1.84 m)
- Position: Point guard

Career history
- –1987: Dinamo București
- 1987–1988: PAOK
- 1988–1996: Apollon Patras

Career highlights
- Greek A2 Basket League champion 1992

Gerasimos Tzakis (Greek: Γεράσιμος Τζάκης; born September 17, 1966) is a Greek–Romanian professional basketball player.

== Early life ==
Tzakis was born in Bucharest to Greek parents.

== Professional career ==
He started his career with Dinamo București. In 1987, he moved to PAOK. After one year, he joined to Apollon Patras in exchange for Bill Melis. One of Tzakis most memorable games, was a 109–91 victory against Olympiacos when Tzakis scored 19 points. Tzakis, stayed eight years to Apollon when he retired during the 1996–97 season.

After his retirement he became a coach in amateur clubs such as E.A. Patras and Panachaiki G.E. He coached Titanes Patras, a wheelchair basketball basketball club.

== National team career ==
Tzakis was playing with the Romanian national basketball team. He participated in the 1992 Pre-Olympic Basketball Tournament. Tzakis retired from the national team in 1993.
