= Ioannis Molfetas =

Greek basketball player

Ioannis Molfetas Ιωάννης Μολφέτας
No. 14 – Trikoupis
- Position: Small forward
- League: Greek A2 Basket League

Personal information
- Born: January 28, 1992 (age 34) Patras, Greece
- Listed height: 6 ft 5 in (1.96 m)
- Listed weight: 196 lb (89 kg)

Career information
- Playing career: 2012–present

Career history
- 2012–2015: Apollon Patras
- 2015–2017: Doukas
- 2017–2018: Panionios
- 2018–2022: Apollon Patras
- 2022–present: Charilaos Trikoupis

Career highlights
- Greek 2nd Division champion (2021)

Ioannis Molfetas (alternate spellings: Giannis) Greek: Ιωάννης Μολφέτας; (born January 28, 1992) is a Greek professional basketball player for Charilaos Trikoupis of the Greek A2 Basket League. He is a 1.96 m (6 ft 5 in) tall small forward.

== Professional career ==
Molfetas started his professional career with Apollon Patras, with which the most important moment of his career was his participation in the Greek Cup final in the 2014–15 season where he lost to Panathoinaikos.

In August 2015, he signed a contract with Doukas, with whom he played in the Greek A2 League for two seasons. In October 2017, he signed for Panionios.

In August 2018, he returned to his former club Apollon Patras. During the 2020–2021 season with Apollon, Molfetas averaged a career-high of 13.4 points and 5.4 rebounds per contest, in 21 games total. The club won the Greek 2nd division title and got promoted to the Greek Basket League. In 10 games during the 2021-22 campaign, he averaged only 3.2 points and 2 rebounds, playing around 11 minutes per contest. On July 2, 2022, he amicably parted ways with the club after a total of seven seasons together.
