= Apollon Patras Indoor Hall =

Sports arean in Patras, Greece

Coordinates: 38.2090°N 21.7645°E

- Perivola Indoor Hall
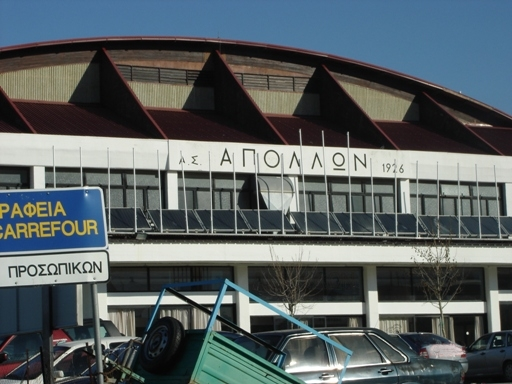
- Apollon Patras Indoor Hall, Perivola
- Interactive map of Apollon Patras Indoor Hall
- Location: Patras, Greece
- Owner: A.S. Apollon
- Capacity: 3,500
- Surface: Parquet

Construction
- Opened: 1992
- Renovated: 2012

Tenant
- Apollon Patras

Apollon Patras Indoor Hall, also known as Perivola Indoor Hall, is an indoor sports arena that is located in Patras, Greece. The arena is known for its unique roof construction, which is made entirely out of wood. The arena belongs to the local multi-sporting club, A.S. Apollon, and it is the home of the club's professional basketball (Apollon Patras) and volleyball teams. The arena has a seating capacity of 3,500 people.

The arena also includes an exercise and weight training room, a sauna, a reception area, a press interview room, and a separate practice facility.

== History ==
Apollon Patras Indoor Hall opened in 1992. Originally, the arena only had tier columns of bleacher style seating, with no individual seats. However, in 2012, the arena was renovated and updated, and seats were added.

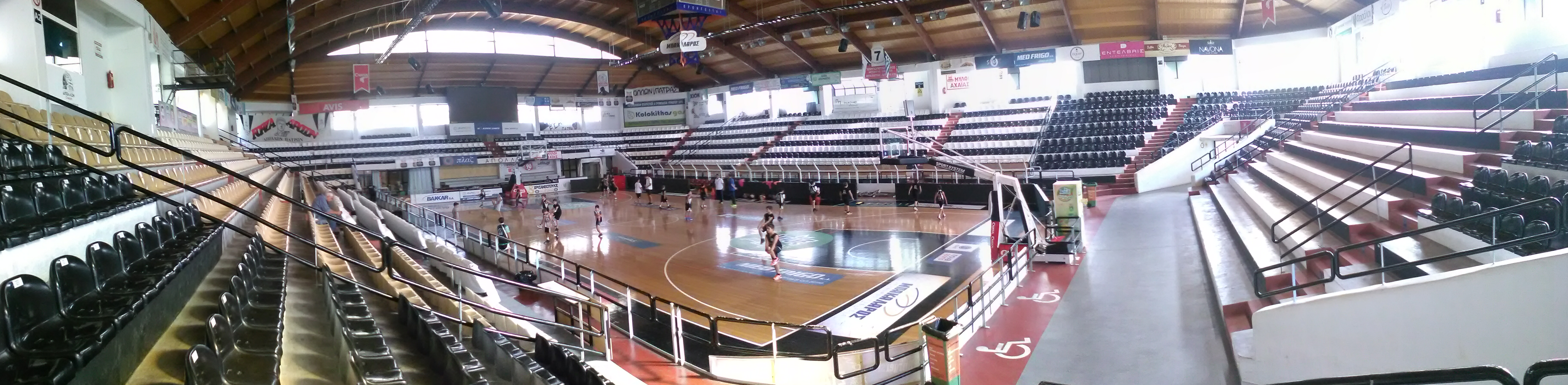
A panorama of Apollon Patras Indoor Hall

== Gallery ==
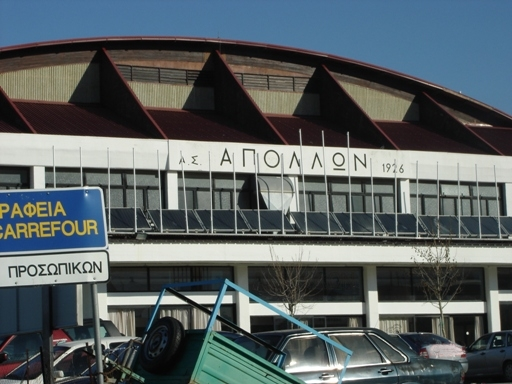
Apollon Patras Indoor Hall, Perivola, exterior (2005).

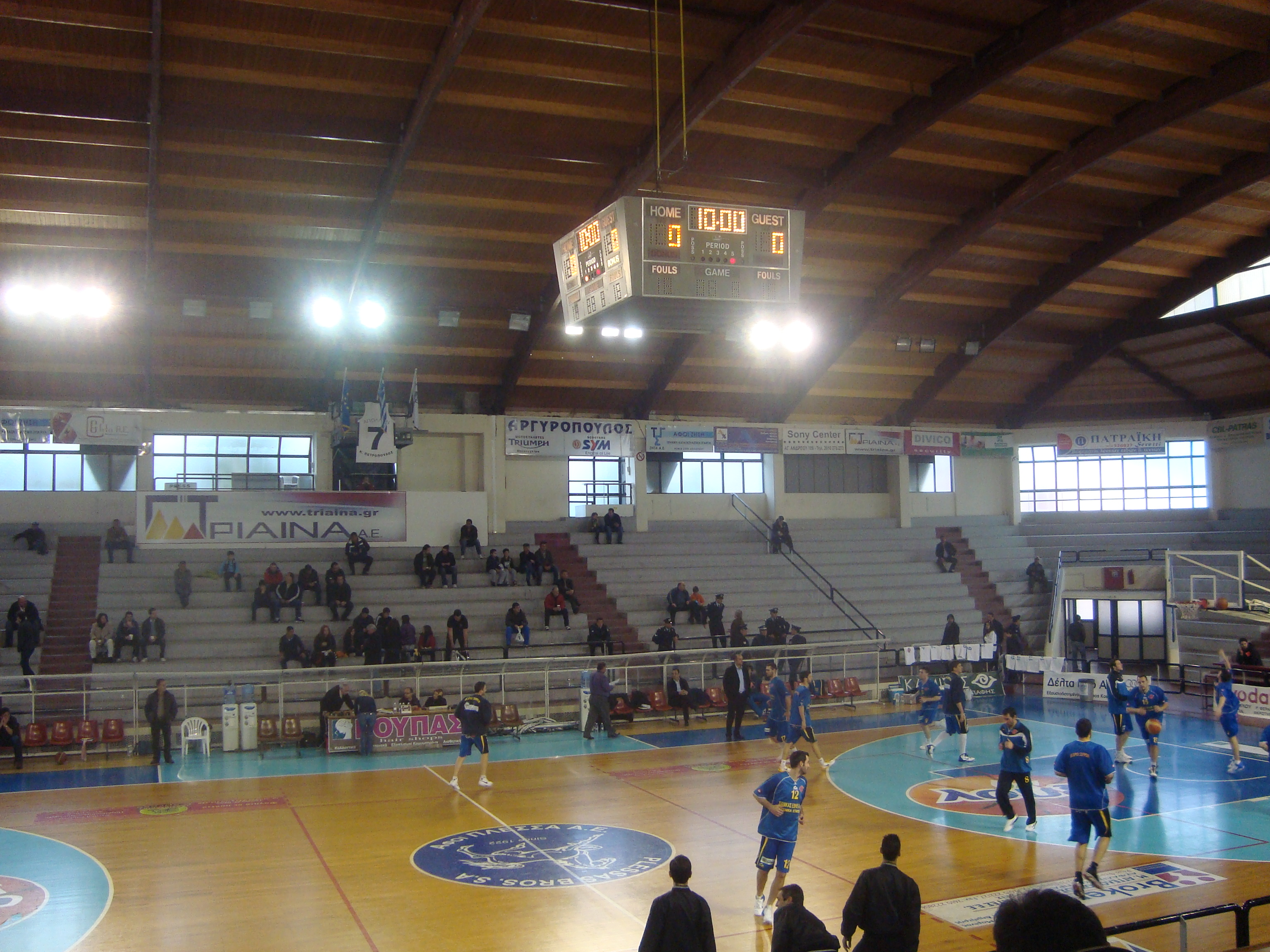
Apollon Patras Indoor Hall, interior, before seats were added to the arena (2011).

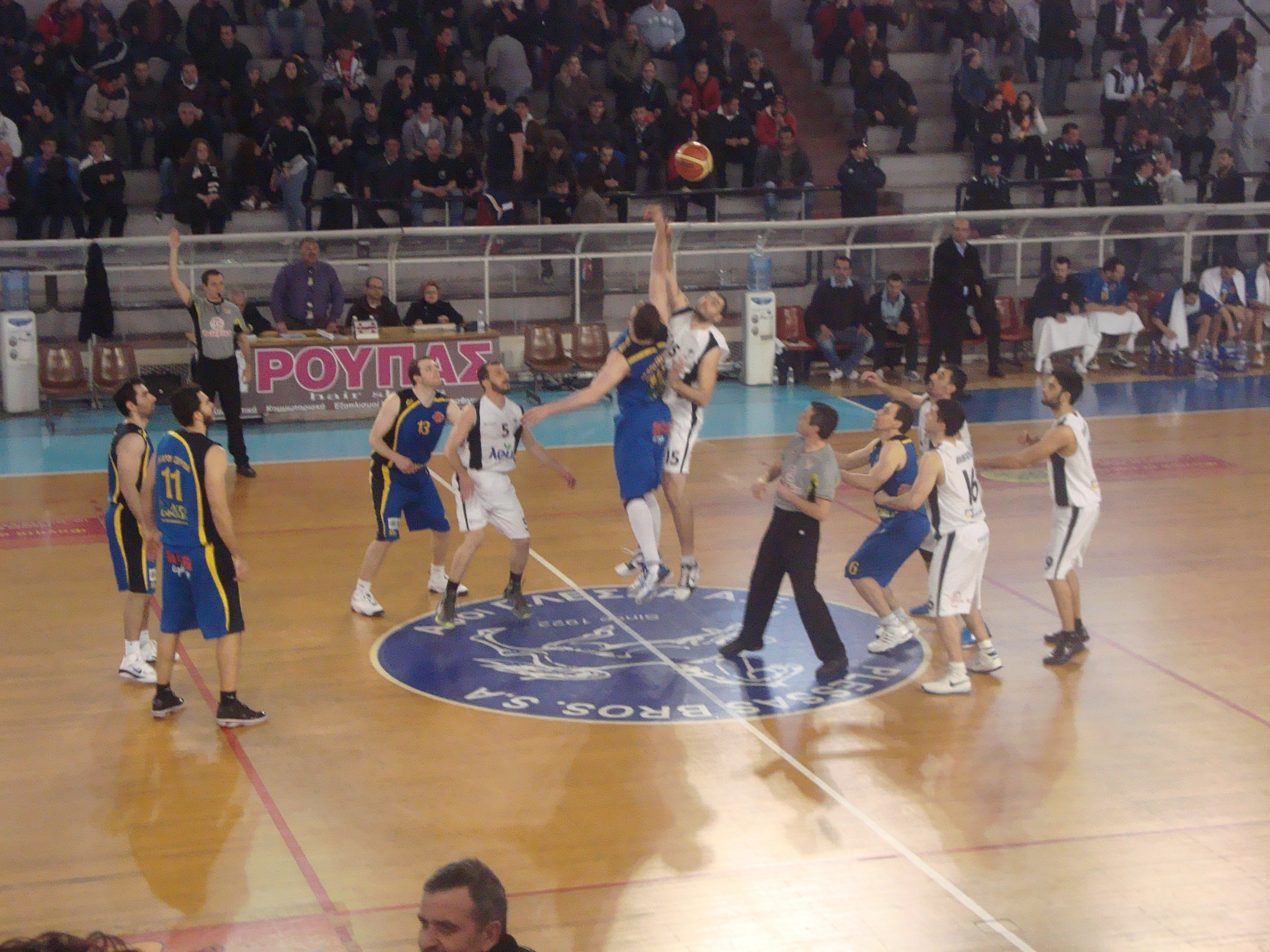
Greek 2nd Division game between Apollon Patras and Ikaroi Serron, during the 2010–11 season.
