= Andreas Pelekoudas =

Greek basketball player

No. 13 – Esperos Patras
- Position: Power forward / center

Personal information
- Born: July 27, 1987 (age 39) Patras, Greece
- Listed height: 6 ft 10 in (2.08 m)

Career information
- Playing career: 2007–present

Career history
- 2007–2012: Esperos Patras
- 2012–2016: Apollon Patras
- 2016–present: Esperos Patras

Andreas Pelekoudas (Greek: Ανδρέας Πελεκούδας; born July 27, 1987) is a Greek professional basketball player. He is a 2.08 m (6 ft 10 in) tall center.

== Professional career ==
Pelekoudas spent the 2007–12 seasons with the Greek club Esperos Patras, playing in the semi-pro 3rd tier division of Greek basketball. In 2012, he signed with the Greek 1st Division club Apollon Patras.
