= Orlando Coleman =

American basketball player

Free agent
- Position: Shooting guard / Small forward

Personal information
- Born: September 9, 1992 (age 34) Birmingham, Alabama, U.S.
- Listed height: 6 ft 5 in (1.96 m)
- Listed weight: 210 lb (95 kg)

Career information
- High school: Pleasant Grove (Birmingham, Alabama)
- College: Alabama Southern CC (2012–2013); Kennesaw State (2013–2015); Texas Southern (2015–2016)
- NBA draft: 2016: undrafted
- Playing career: 2016–present

Career history
- 2016–2017: KW Titans
- 2017: Centauros de Chihuahua
- 2017: Caballeros de Culiacán
- 2017–2018: Radnički Kragujevac
- 2018: Southland Sharks
- 2018–2019: Jászberényi KSE
- 2019–2020: Atomerőmű SE
- 2020: Maccabi Kiryat Motzkin
- 2020–2021: Jászberényi KSE
- 2021–2022: Apollon Patras
- 2022: Champagne Châlons-Reims
- 2022–2023: Enisey
- 2023: Guaros de Lara
- 2023–2024: Al-Naft
- 2024: Apollon Patras
- 2024: Al-Difaa Al-Jawi
- 2025: Trotamundos de Carabobo

Career highlights
- Iraqi Perseverance Cup winner (2023); Iraqi Perseverance Cup MVP (2023); Hungarian League Top Scorer (2021); NZNBL champion (2018)

Marcus Orlando Coleman Jr (born September 9, 1992) is an American professional basketball player.

== High school career ==
Coleman played with Pleasant Grove High School, in Birmingham, Alabama.

== College career ==
Coleman played college basketball with the Morehead State, Alabama Southern CC, Kennesaw State and Texas Southern. As a senior at Texas Southern, he averaged 6.4 points and 4 rebounds per game.

== Professional career ==
After going undrafted in the 2016 NBA draft, Coleman signed with the KW Titans of the NBL Canada. Later that year, he also played for Centauros de Chihuahua and Caballeros de Culiacán in Mexico. The following year, Coleman joined Radnički Kragujevac in Serbia. On April 2, 2018, Coleman joined Southland Sharks of the NBZL. with the Sharks, Coleman won the 2018 New Zealand NBL championship.

From 2018 to 2020, Coleman played with Jászberényi KSE and Atomerőmű SE in Hungary.

During the end of the 2019–20 season, he had a short stint with Maccabi Kiryat Motzkin in Israel.

The following season, he returned to Jászberényi KSE, where he became the Top Scorer of the Hungarian League. During the season, he averaged 25 points, 6.6 rebounds and 2.9 assists per game.

On July 19, 2021, Coleman joined Apollon Patras of the Greek Basket League. In his debut with the team, he scored 22 points and grabbed 9 rebounds in a home win against Ionikos Nikaias. In a total of 9 games with the Greek club, Coleman averaged 17.3 points, 4.9 rebounds, and 1.3 assists per contest.

On January 8, 2022, he signed with Champagne Châlons-Reims of the LNB Pro A. He finished the season having stints with Enisey and Guaros de Lara.

On January 12, 2024, Coleman returned to Apollon Patras for the rest of the season. In 9 games, he averaged 10.3 points, 2.1 rebounds and 2.3 assists in 28 minutes of play.
