= Zaharias Katsoulis =

Greek basketball player

Personal information
- Born: February 24, 1962 (age 64) Drama, Greece
- Listed height: 6 ft 4.77 in (1.95 m)
- Position: Shooting guard/ small forward

Career history
- –1979: AO Dramas
- 1979–1988: PAOK
- 1988–1991: Apollon Patras
- 1991–1992: KAOD

Zaharias Katsoulis (Greek: Ζαχαρίας Κατσούλης; born February 24, 1962) is a retired Greek professional basketball player.

== Professional career ==
Katsoulis began his career with AO Dramas. He then played with PAOK, from 1979 to 1988. At PAOK Zaharias played along his elder brothers Giorgos (played for PAOK from 1977 to 1980) and Manthos Katsoulis. The three brothers played together in seven games. Zaharias won, with PAOK the Greek Basketball Cup in 1984, which is as 'The Final of Shaved Heads'. Katsoulis said that the action to cut their hair, was betoken their convection. Moreover, the previous night the players watch the film Under Fire (film), which inspire them. In 1988 Katsoulis moved to Apollon Patras along with four other PAOK's players, as exchange for Bill Melis transfer. He was the leader of Patras team until 1991. In 1991 he joined at KAOD and he finished his career due injury problems the next year.

After, his retirement Katsoulis became a lawyer for many years, as he finished his studies from Aristotle University of Thessaloniki. Now he is an entrepreneur, involved with swimming pool construction.

== Greek national team ==
Katsoulis was a member of the senior men's Greek national basketball team in 1985. He has 11 caps and he scored 69 points. He was also member of Greece men's national under-16 basketball team, and Greece men's national under-20 basketball team.
