= Sarantis Mastrogiannopoulos =

Greek basketball player (born 1997)

No. 56 – Iraklis Thessaloniki
- Position: Point guard / shooting guard
- League: Greek Basketball League; FIBA Europe Cup

Personal information
- Born: December 3, 1997 (age 28) Patra, Greece
- Listed height: 6 ft 2.7 in (1.90 m)
- Listed weight: 192 lb (87 kg)

Career information
- Playing career: 2013–present

Career history
- 2013–2018: Apollon Patra
- 2018–2021: Lavrio
- 2021–2022: Koroivos Amaliada
- 2022–2023: Apollon Patra
- 2023–2025: Iraklis Thessaloniki
- 2025–2026: Vikos Falcons Ioannina
- 2026–present: Iraklis Thessaloniki

Career highlights
- All-Greek Elite League Team (2024)

Sarantis Mastrogiannopoulos (alternate spellings: Sarandis) (Greek: Σαράντης Μαστρογιαννόπουλος; born December 3, 1997) is a Greek professional basketball player for Iraklis Thessaloniki of the Greek Basketball League (GBL) and the FIBA Europe Cup. He is a 1.90 m (6 ft 2.7 in) tall combo guard.

== Professional career ==
=== Apollon Patra ===
Mastrogiannopoulos started his professional career with the Greek Basketball League club Apollon Patras in 2013. During the 2017–18 season Mastrogiannopoulos had a breakout year with Apollon Patras. In 31 games, he averaged 12 points, 3.2 rebounds and 1.8 assists per game. Apollon didn't manage to get the promotion back to the Greek Basketball League, after being defeated from Holargos at the promotion game.

=== Lavrio ===
On July 3, 2018, Mastrogiannopoulos joined Lavrio of the Greek Basketball League on a two-year contract. He averaged 4.5 points, 1.5 rebounds and 1.2 assists per game during the 2019–20 season. On August 17, 2020, he renewed his contract with the Attica club.

=== Koroivos Amaliada ===
Mastrogiannopoulos spent the 2021-2022 campaign in the Greek 2nd division with Koroivos Amaliadas. In 27 games, he averaged career-highs of 15.3 points, 4.2 rebounds, 3.1 assists and 1.7 steals per contest.

=== Return to Apollon Patra ===
On August 13, 2022, Mastrogiannopoulos made his return to Apollon Patras after four years. In 21 league games, he averaged 5.4 points, 1.8 rebounds and 1 assist in 16 minutes per contest. On May 25, 2023, Mastrogiannopoulos rejected the club's renewal proposal and became a free agent.

=== Iraklis ===
On August 26, 2023, Mastrogiannopoulos signed with Iraklis.
