= Bill Melis =

R Greek–American basketball player

William Melis
Personal information
- Born: August 28, 1960 (age 66) Cleveland, United States
- Listed height: 6 ft 7.93 in (2.03 m)

Career information
- College: Kenyon College
- Playing career: 1982–1996
- Position: Power forward (basketball)
- Number: 9,14

Career history
- 1982–1988: Apollon Patras B.C.
- 1988–1990: PAOK
- 1991–1994: Dafni
- 1994–1995: Peiraikos Syndesmos
- 1995–1996: Milon

William Melis (Greek: Μπιλ Μέλις or Βασίλης Μέλις) is a former Greek–American professional basketball player.

== College career ==
Melis played college basketball at Kenyon College. He was the captain of the team during his senior season. Moreover, he is still one of the most pertinent players of his college, having almost 49% at field goals.

== Professional career ==
Melis started his career playing with Apollon Patras B.C. At his first season, one of his best performance was a game against PAOK. Melis scored 27 points in a 73-85 home defeat. At 1986–87 season Melis scored 361 points in Greek Basketball League and he finished in first ten scorers. In 1988 he was transferred to PAOK. Thessaloniki's club paid to Apollon 25 million Greek drachma and gave five players, including Mark Petteway, Zaharias Katsoulis, Gerasimos Tzakis, Platon Hotokouridis and Panagiotis Kalogiros. He played two years with PAOK, and he missed 1990-91 season due to a serious family problem. Melis joined to Dafni in 1991, and he played for three years in the Greek Basketball League. He finished his career playing in Greek A2 Basket League with Peiraikos Syndesmos and Milon.
