= Michalis Lountzis =

Greek basketball player

No. 27 – Maroussi
- Position: Shooting guard
- League: GBL

Personal information
- Born: August 4, 1998 (age 28) Maroussi, Athens, Greece
- Listed height: 1.98 m (6 ft 6 in)
- Listed weight: 91 kg (201 lb)

Career information
- Playing career: 2014–present

Career history
- 2014–2019: Panathinaikos
- 2017–2018: →Trikala
- 2018–2019: →Lavrio
- 2019–2020: Lavrio
- 2020–2021: Promitheas Patras
- 2021–2024: Olympiacos
- 2024–2025: Promitheas Patras
- 2025–2026: Panionios
- 2026–present: Maroussi

Career highlights
- 3× Greek League champion (2017, 2022, 2023); 6× Greek Cup winner (2015–2017, 2022–2024); 3× Greek Supercup winner (2020, 2022, 2023)
Medals
Representing Greece
Men's basketball
FIBA Europe Under-18 Championship
Gold medal – first place	2015 Greece	Under-18
FIBA Europe Under-20 Championship B
Bronze medal – third place	2016 Greece	Under-20
FIBA Europe Under-20 Championship
Gold medal – first place	2017 Greece	Under-20

Michalis Lountzis (alternate spelling: Michail) (Greek: Μιχάλης Λούντζης; born 4 August 1998) is a Greek professional basketball player for Maroussi of the Greek Basketball League (GBL). He is a 1.98 m (6 ft 6 in) tall combo guard.

== Early career ==
Lountzis started playing basketball in Zakynthos, where he is from. Lountzis was invited to the Next Generation Practices at the 2014 Adidas Eurocamp, in Treviso, Italy, and, earlier that year, to the Jordan Brand Classic International Tour. Lountzis played with Kronos Agiou Dimitriou in Greece's amateur level fourth division, in the 2013–14 season.

== Professional career ==
On 23 June 2014, Lountzis signed a five-year deal with Panathinaikos of Greece's top-tier level Greek Basket League. Lountzis made his professional debut at age 16, with Panathinaikos, on January 12, 2015, in a Greek Basket League victory over Panelefsiniakos.

He became the youngest player ever to play in the Greek Cup Final, when he played with Panathinaikos in their victory against Apollon Patras, in the 2015 Greek Cup Final, on April 5, 2015. He made his debut in the European-wide top-tier level EuroLeague, at the age of 16, on April 14, 2015, in a playoff game against CSKA Moscow.

On August 21, 2017, Lountzis was loaned to Trikala for the 2017–18 season. On July 27, 2018, Lountzis was loaned once more, this time to Lavrio for the 2018–19 season. On July 2, 2019, Lountzis was released from his contract with Panathinaikos after five years.

On August 5, 2019, Lountzis agreed to a new two-year (1+1) contract with Lavrio. He averaged 5.9 points, 2.6 rebounds and 1.25 assists per game. On July 24, 2020, Lountzis moved to Promitheas.

On July 6, 2021, Lountzis signed a three-year deal with Olympiacos, where he spent three seasons mostly as an auxiliary player.

On July 29, 2024, Lountzis parted ways with Olympiacos and returned to Promitheas.

On June 25, 2025, Lountzis joined Panionios of the Greek Basketball League and the EuroCup. In November 2025, he suffered an anterior cruciate ligament tear and would need surgery. He was going to be sidelined for at least six months. He previously suffered a torn cruciate ligament in 2019.

== National team career ==
=== Greek junior national team ===
Lountzis was the captain of the junior Greek Under-16 national team at the 2014 FIBA Europe Under-16 Championship. He also played with Greece's junior national teams at the 2015 FIBA Under-19 World Cup, the 2015 FIBA Europe Under-18 Championship, where he won a gold medal, and at the 2nd division 2016 FIBA Europe Under-20 Championship Division B, where he won a bronze medal. He also played at the 2017 FIBA Europe Under-20 Championship, where he won a gold medal.

=== Greek senior national team ===
Lountzis first became a member of the senior Greek national basketball team in 2018. He played with Greece at the 2019 FIBA World Cup qualification, and at the EuroBasket 2022.

== Career statistics ==
Legend
GP	Games played	GS	Games started	MPG	Minutes per game
FG%	Field-goal percentage	3P%	3-point field-goal percentage	FT%	Free-throw percentage
RPG	Rebounds per game	APG	Assists per game	SPG	Steals per game
BPG	Blocks per game	PPG	Points per game	PIR	Performance index rating
**Bold**	Career high

=== EuroLeague ===
Year	Team	GP	GS	MPG	FG%	3P%	FT%	RPG	APG	SPG	BPG	PPG	PIR
2014–15	Panathinaikos	2	0	**7.5**	.333	.000	—	1.0	**2.0**	—	—	1.0	2.0
2015–16	Panathinaikos	2	0	5.0	**1.000**	—	—	**2.5**	1.5	.5	—	1.0	**4.0**
2021–22	Olympiacos	14	0	3.8	.167	.167	.000	.4	.2	.1	—	0.4	-0.8
2022–23	Olympiacos	**20**	0	6.7	.429	**.357**	**.667**	1.3	.5	**.6**	**.1**	**1.7**	2.5
2023–24	Olympiacos	14	**1**	8.3	.241	.118	.625	0.6	.4	.3	**.1**	1.5	0.2
Career		52	1	6.3	.315	.211	.563	.9	.5	.3	.1	1.2	1.0

=== EuroCup ===
Year	Team	GP	GS	MPG	FG%	3P%	FT%	RPG	APG	SPG	BPG	PPG	PIR
2020–21	Promitheas Patras	10	5	17.1	.464	.346	.667	3.1	1.6	.6	.1	6.7	7.5
Career		10	5	17.1	.464	.346	.667	3.1	1.6	.6	.1	6.7	7.5

=== Domestic leagues ===
Year	Team	League	GP	MPG	FG%	3P%	FT%	RPG	APG	SPG	BPG	PPG
2014–15	(Greece) Panathinaikos	GBL	11	7.6	.429	.333	.700	1.1	1.1	.2	—	2.5
2015–16	(Greece) Panathinaikos	GBL	8	5.5	.500	.400	.500	.6	.7	.2	—	1.4
2016–17	(Greece) Panathinaikos	GBL	4	5.2	.714	.500	1.000	.5	—	.7	—	4.0
2017–18	(Greece) Trikala Aries	GBL	23	27.3	.339	.358	.716	4.1	1.9	1.5	.0	8.9
2018–19	(Greece) Lavrio	GBL	21	17.9	.469	.289	.805	2.3	2.1	.7	.1	6.5
2019–20	(Greece) Lavrio	GBL	8	12.0	.433	.417	.889	2.6	1.2	1.0	.2	5.9
2020–21	(Greece) Promitheas Patras	GBL	31	24.9	.434	.256	.667	4.0	2.7	.9	.4	8.1
2021–22	(Greece) Olympiacos	GBL	27	11.8	.476	.390	.700	1.8	1.7	.7	.2	4.5
2022–23	(Greece) Olympiacos	GBL	29	14.6	.569	.400	.700	2.1	1.6	.8	.2	5.9
2023–24	(Greece) Olympiacos	GBL	25	14.8	.467	.420	.588	2.2	1.9	1.0	.2	5.1
2024–25	(Greece) Promitheas Patras	GBL	24	27.8	.388	.283	.667	3.7	3.8	1.5	.0	11.8

== Awards and accomplishments ==
=== Club career ===
- 3× Greek League Champion: (2017, 2022, 2023)
- 5× Greek Cup Winner: (2015, 2016, 2017, 2022, 2023)
- 2× Greek Super Cup Winner: (2020, 2022)

=== Greek junior national team ===
- 2015 FIBA Europe Under-18 Championship: Gold
- 2016 FIBA Europe Under-20 Championship Division B: Bronze
- 2017 FIBA Europe Under-20 Championship: Gold

== See also ==
- List of youngest EuroLeague players
