= Thanasis Papachatzis =

Greek basketball coach (born 1969)

Personal information
- Born: September 11, 1969 (age 57) Athens, Greece

Career information
- College: University of North Carolina (1992–1994)
- Position: Assistant coach
- Coaching career: 1989–present

Career history

Coaching
- 1989–1992: Maroussi (Academies)
- 1994–1995: Dafnis
- 1995–1999: Panathinaikos (assistant)
- 2000–2001: Panionios (assistant)
- 2001–2002: Maroussi (assistant)
- 2002–2003: Olympiacos (assistant)
- 2004–2005: Aris (assistant)
- 2005–2006: AEK Athens (assistant)
- 2006–2008: Aris (assistant)
- 2011–2012: Lokomotiv Kuban (assistant)
- 2012–2014: Panionios (assistant)
- 2014: Peristeri
- 2014–2015: Panionios
- 2015: APOEL
- 2015: Apollon Patras
- 2016: Hoops
- 2017: AEK Athens (assistant)
- 2024: Maroussi (assistant)

Career highlights
- Saporta Cup champion (2001)

Athanasios "Thanasis" Papachatzis (also spelled Thanassis; Greek: Αθανάσιος "Θανάσης" Παπαχατζής; born September 11, 1969) is a Greek basketball coach.

== Coaching career ==
=== Clubs ===
Papachatzis started his coaching career when he was just 20 years old for the academies of Maroussi for three seasons (1989–90, 1990–91 and 1991–92). After, he moved to Dafnis for the 1994–95 season. In 1995 he moved to Panathinaikos as an assistant coach, where he won 2 Greek League Championships, 1 Greek Cup, 1 EuroLeague and 1 FIBA Intercontinental Cup. Next he moved to many teams as an assistant coach Panionios, Aris, Olympiacos, AEK Athens and back to Aris. For 2011–12 season he moved to Russia for Lokomotiv Kuban as an assistant coach. After this season he came back in Greece for Panionios and he became an assistant coach, under head coach Ioannis Sfairopoulos.

On March 15, 2017, Papachatzis moved to AEK Athens to become an assistant coach, under head coach Sotiris Manolopoulos.

== Awards and accomplishments ==
=== As Assistant coach ===
- EuroLeague: 1 (with Panathinaikos: 1996)
- FIBA Intercontinental Cup Champion: (1996)
- 2x Greek League Champion: (1998, 1999)
- Greek Cup Winner: (1996)
