= Mark Petteway =

American basketball player

Personal information
- Born: June 12, 1961 New Orleans, Louisiana, U.S.
- Died: June 1, 1989 (aged 27)
- Listed height: 6 ft 8 in (2.03 m)
- Listed weight: 210 lb (95 kg)

Career information
- High school: Brother Martin (New Orleans, Louisiana)
- College: Gulf Coast CC (1979–1980); New Orleans (1980–1983)
- NBA draft: 1983: 5th round, 111th overall pick
- Drafted by: Milwaukee Bucks
- Playing career: 1983–1989
- Position: Small forward / power forward

Career history
- 1985–1986: Kansas City Sizzlers
- 1984–1985: Estudiantes de Caracas
- 1987–1988: PAOK
- 1988–1989: Apollon Patras B.C.
- Stats at Basketball Reference

Mark Petteway (June 12, 1961 – June 1, 1989) was an American basketball player who played professionally in Venezuela and Greece.

== College career ==
Petteway played for New Orleans Privateers men's basketball. He was the second scorer of his college at his first season with 15.8 points average. Moreover, he was the first scorer at the two next seasons, with 15.2 and 18.1 points accordingly.

== Professional career ==
Petteway was selected by Milwaukee Bucks in 1983 draft, but he never played in National Basketball Association. He played in Venezuela in 1984 and 1985 with Estudiantes de Caracas. In 1987 he signed with PAOK, and along Delaney Rudd competed in 1987–88 FIBA Korać Cup. Petteway, in a game against KK Crvena zvezda, broke the basketball backboard, after a dunk from Rudd's assist. He went to the hospital for stitching, and he returned to the game at the 32nd minute. He send tied the game to 83–83 send it into overtime. Finally, PAOK lost with 93–88 but Petteway played bravely until the end of the game, despite the pain and the bleeding. Ιn 1988 he moved to Apollon Patras B.C., along with other four fellow players, and he became Apollon's first foreign player. During this season Apollon was placed sixth place in the Greek Basket League which gave the qualification for 1989–90 FIBA Korać Cup. His personal best score was 45 points against AEK B.C. He played 23 games with Apollon, scoring 672 points (27.3 average) and 8.1 rebounds per game.

Petteway died of an apparent self-inflicted gunshot wound to the mouth.

== See also ==
- List of basketball players who died during their careers
