= Sporting Sports Arena =

Coordinates: 38.0197°N 23.7324°E

- Sporting Indoor Hall
- Interactive map of Sporting Sports Arena
- Location: Patissia, Athens
- Capacity: Basketball: 2,500
- Public transit: Agios Eleftherios metro station

Construction
- Opened: 1968
- Renovated: 2002
- Expanded: 2002

Sporting Sports Arena, AKA Sporting Indoor Hall is an indoor basketball sporting arena that is located in the area of Patissia, Athens, Greece. The seating capacity of the arena is 2,500 people. The arena is currently home to the Greek professional basketball team AO Sporting.

== History ==
The hall was opened in 1968. It was the home of the EuroLeague giants Panathinaikos, from 2002 to 2004, while their regular home arena, OAKA Indoor Hall, was being upgraded for the 2004 Athens Olympics. In recent years, the hall has been renovated several times, and air conditioning was added. It is one of the last pro-basketball arenas in Greece from the old Greek basketball era. The arena is known for the fact that fans can hear the conversations of the players and coaches during the game.
