= Brandon Penn =

American basketball player

Personal information
- Born: June 5, 1990 (age 36) Philadelphia, Pennsylvania
- Listed height: 6 ft 8 in (2.03 m)
- Listed weight: 205 lb (93 kg)

Career information
- High school: Paul Robeson (Brooklyn, New York)
- College: Rider (2008–2012)
- NBA draft: 2012: undrafted
- Playing career: 2012–present
- Position: Forward
- Number: 31

Career history
- 2012–2013: Takamatsu Five Arrows
- 2013–2014: Bakken Bears
- 2014–2015: Apollon Patras
- 2015–2016: Kožuv
- 2016–2017: Al Sadd Doha
- 2017: Jolly Jadranska Banka
- 2017–2018: Plymouth Raiders
- 2018: KR
- 2018–2019: Blokotehna
- 2019–2020: Kolubara LA 2003
- 2020–2021: Jászberényi KSE
- 2022–2023: Kolubara LA 2003
- 2023–2024: Kožuv

Career highlights
- BIBL champion (2019); Danish League champion (2014); Second-team All-MAAC (2012)

Brandon Penn (born June 5, 1990) is an American professional basketball player who last played for Jászberényi KSE of the Hungarian League. He won the Danish championship with the Bakken Bears in 2014.

== Professional career ==
Penn played in Japan, Denmark and Greece during his career. On January 12, 2018, Penn signed with KR of the Úrvalsdeild karla. He left the club in mid-February due to family issues and did not return. In 5 games, he averaged 12.8 points and 7.0 rebounds.
