= Vassilis Niforas =

Greek basketball player

Free agent
- Position: Power forward

Personal information
- Born: August 2, 1991 (age 35) Patras, Greece
- Listed height: 6 ft 7.5 in (2.02 m)
- Listed weight: 180 lb (82 kg)

Career information
- Playing career: 2011–present

Career history
- 2011–2013: Esperos Patras
- 2013–2017: Apollon Patras
- 2017–2018: Glafkos
- 2018–2019: KAO Korinthos
- 2019–2021: Apollon Patras

Career highlights
- Greek 2nd Division champion (2021)

Vassilis Niforas (alternate spellings: Vasilis, Vasileios) (Greek: Βασίλης Νιφόρας; born August 2, 1991) is a Greek professional basketball player who last played for Apollon Patras of the Greek A2 Basket League. He is a 2.02 m (6 ft 8 in) tall power forward.

== Professional career ==
Niforas spent the 2011–13 seasons with the Greek club Esperos Patras, playing in the semi-pro 3rd tier division of Greek basketball. In 2013, he signed with the Greek 1st Division club Apollon Patras.
