= St Pierre's Sushi =

New Zealand sushi restaurant chain

St Pierres Sushi
- St Pierres Sushi logo
- Type: Limited company
- Industry: Food and Hospitality
- Founded: August 25, 1984; 42 years ago in Wellington, New Zealand
- Founder: Nick Katsoulis; Costa Katsoulis; Perry Katsoulis
- Headquarters: Auckland, New Zealand
- Area served: New Zealand
- Products: Sushi, Bento Bowl, K10 Sushi Train
- Website: stpierres.online

St Pierres Sushi is a New Zealand owned and operated sushi chain that was established in 1984 by brothers Nick, Costa, and Perry Katsoulis. As of 2025, the chain has 80 stores across New Zealand.

== History ==
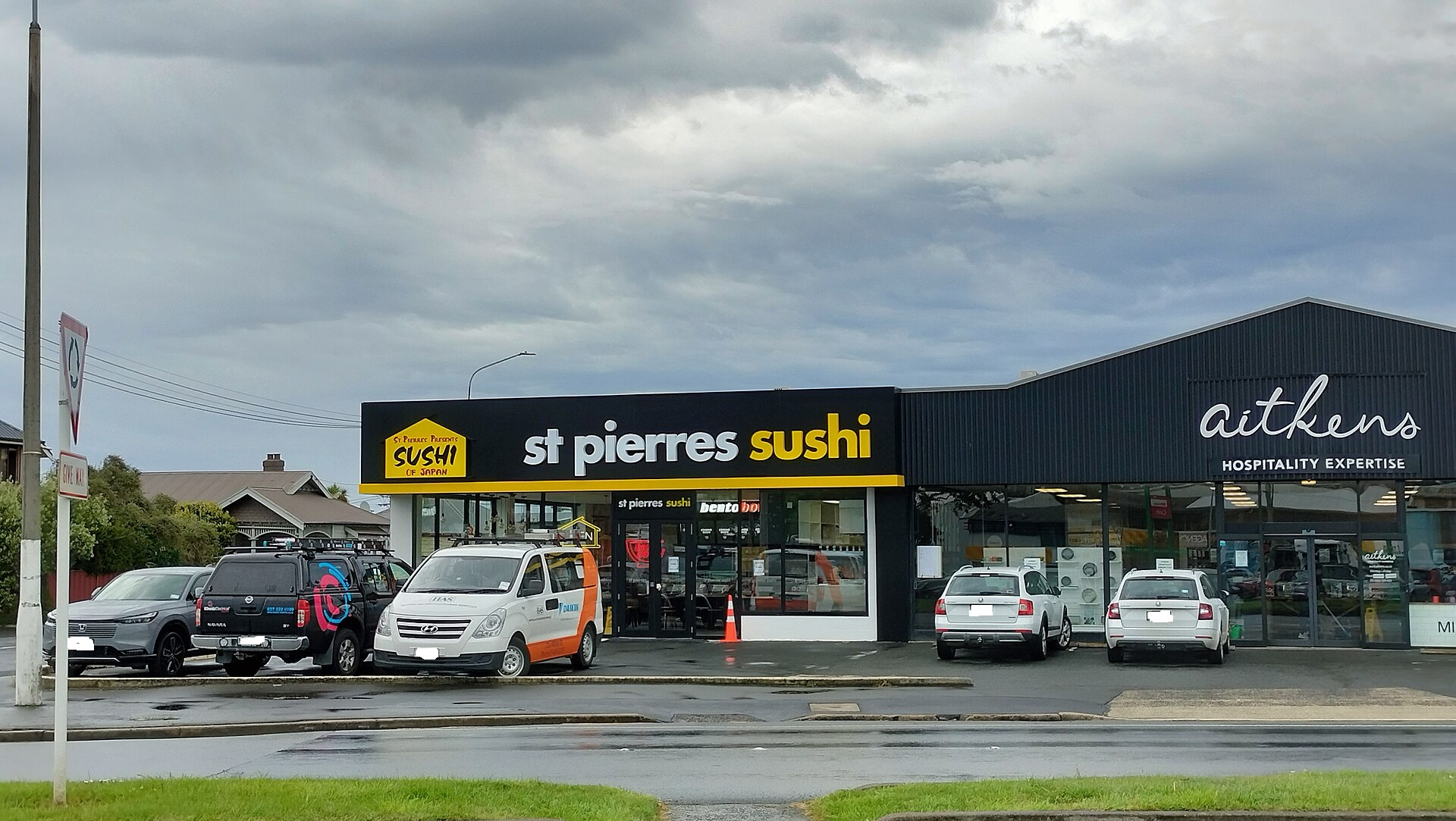
St Pierre's Sushi store in South Dunedin.

St Pierres Sushi originated as a delicatessen and seafood store in Wellington in 1984. The restaurant's name St Pierres was derived from the French name for the New Zealand fish John Dory, and also refers to St Peter, the patron saint of fishermen. In 1992, St Pierres began selling sushi. A year later, the chain formed a partnership with the Japanese food exporter, The Tokyo Mutual Trading Company, for the supplies of traditional Japanese condiments in sushi making.

According to academics Rumi Sakamoto and Matthew Allen, St Pierres provided a template for the emergence of "Kiwi standard sushi" by marketing sushi as a "healthy, value-for-money lunch option able to compete with other ethnic food court options".

Since 1993, St Pierres opened sushi and Bento Bowl restaurants across New Zealand in Christchurch, Wellington and Auckland. By November 2008, St Pierres had 28 stores in the major centres of New Zealand, including a store in Ponsonby, Auckland.

St Pierres went on to open a new store in New Plymouth in December 2016, which created new jobs and in November 2019, a new store in Invercargill.

The sushi chain opened the country's first sushi drive-through restaurant in 2022 at Onehunga, Auckland. By February 2023, St Pierres Sushi had 69 stores across New Zealand including new stores in Tauranga, Ashburton, Nelson and Karaka in South Auckland. To boost growth, St Pierres introduced bento bowls to its online menu and in-store self-service kiosks. In 2023, the chain also signed on with food delivery service UberEats to bring sushi and bento bowl to the comfort of the customers' home.

In November 2024, on popular demand, the sushi chain opened its first store in Dunedin. In July 2025, St Pierres opened a second drive-through restaurant in Hastings.
