= Nikos Argyropoulos =

Greek basketball player

Nikos Argyropoulos Νίκος Αργυρόπουλος
Personal information
- Born: March 25, 1978 (age 48) Patras, Greece
- Listed height: 6 ft 2 in (1.88 m)
- Listed weight: 190 lb (86 kg)

Career information
- Playing career: 1996–2016
- Position: Point guard / shooting guard
- Number: 5, 9, 33

Career history
- 1996–2005: Apollon Patras
- 2005–2006: Olympiacos
- 2006–2008: Panellinios
- 2008–2010: Aris
- 2010–2016: Apollon Patras

Career highlights
- Greek 2nd Division champion (2003); Greek 2nd Division MVP (2012); No. 5 retired by Apollon Patras (2019)

Nikolaos "Nikos" Argyropoulos (alternate spelling: Argiropoulos) (Greek: Νικόλαος "Νίκος" Αργυρόπουλος; born March 25, 1978, in Patras, Greece) is a Greek former professional basketball player. At a height of 1.88 m (6 ft 2 in) tall, he played at the point guard and shooting guard positions

== Professional career ==
Argyropoulos started his professional career with the Greek club Apollon Patras. After playing three years with Apollon in the top-tier level Greek 1st Division, the club moved down to the second-tier level Greek 2nd Division, for 4 years. In 2003, Apollon returned to the Greek first division. In 2005, Argyropoulos moved to the Greek EuroLeague club Olympiacos Piraeus, where he played for one year. After that, he moved to the Greek EuroCup club Panellinios Athens. He then joined the Greek EuroCup club Aris Thessaloniki, before finishing his pro club playing career with Apollon Patras.

Argyropoulos was voted the Greek 2nd Division's MVP in 2012. His number 5 jersey was retired by Apollon Patras, in 2019.

== National team career ==
Argyropoulos was a member of the Greek junior national teams. He played at the 1996 FIBA Europe Under-18 Championship.

== Executive career ==
After he retired from playing professional basketball, Argyropoulos began working for the Greek professional basketball club Apollon Patras, as an executive.
