= Apollon Patras =

Multisports club in Greece

A.S. Apollon Patras
- Full name: Αθλητικός Σύλλογος Πατρών «Απόλλων» Athlitikos Syllogos Patron "Apollon" (Patras Sporting Club "Apollo")
- Nicknames: Μελανόλευκοι (Black-Whites)
- Founded: 1926; 100 years ago
- Based in: Patras, Greece
- Colours: Black White
- President: Yannis Christopoulos
- Website: apollonpatras.gr

Athlitikos Syllogos Patron "Apollon" (Greek: Αθλητικός Σύλλογος Πατρών «Απόλλων», lit. 'Patras Sporting Club "Apollo"') is a multi-sports club that is based in Patras, Greece. It has included sports sections in association football, basketball, table tennis, and volleyball. The club is named after the ancient Greek God Apollo, and its team colours are black and white.

== History ==
The club was founded in 1926, in the Prosfygika neighborhood. The football club entered the Achaea FCA, and played many matches against Panachaiki, APS Olympiakos, Patraikos, and Thyella. The team's ground was in the Olympiakos Patras Arena, today's Prosfygika Stadium.

The football team was later dissolved, and today Apollon is mainly a basketball team, K.A.E. Apollon Patras. It is a regular member of the top-tier level (Greek Basket League), has participated in the Saporta Cup (1997, 1998), the Korać Cup (1999), and has played in the Greek Cup Final in 1997, where they lost the title game against Olympiacos, by a score of 78–80.

== Honours ==
=== Basketball ===
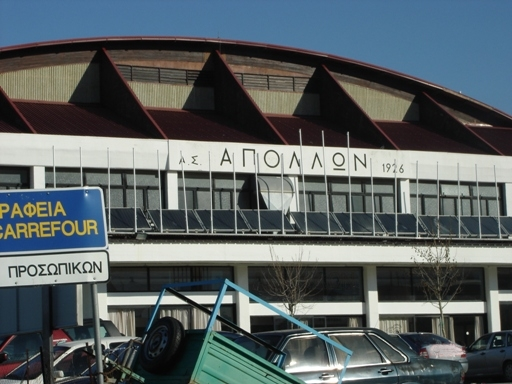
Apollon Patras Indoor Hall, in Perivola, Patras

Men's team

- Participation in the Premier Division (Basket League) (32x): 1972, 1974, 1977, 1978, 1980, 1981, 1982, 1983, 1984, 1985, 1986, 1987, 1988, 1989, 1990, 1991, 1993, 1994, 1995, 1996, 1997, 1998, 1999, 2004, 2005, 2006, 2007, 2013, 2014, 2015, 2016, 2017

Titles: (8x)

- Divisional titles: (5x)
  - Greek A2 Basket League (3x): 1992, 2003, 2021
  - Greek B Basket League (2x): 1976,1979
- Local titles: (4x)
  - Achaia Local Regional Championships (4x): 1956, 1958, 1971, 1973

Greek Honours:

- Greek Cup Finalist (2x): 1997, 2015

European honours:

- Saporta Cup: Round of 16, 1997
- Saporta Cup: Round of 32, 1998
- Korać Cup: Round of 16, 1999

Women's team

- Achaia local regional championship winner (3x): 1998, 2006, 2007

=== Volleyball ===
Men's team

- Achaia local regional championship winner (3x): 1998, 2005, 2007
- Participation in the Second National Division: 2001, 2002
- Participation in the Third National Division: 2004, 2006

Women's team

- Achaia local regional championship winner (2x): 2007, 2008
- Participation in the Second National Division: 2001, 2002

=== Football ===
- Achaia local regional championship winner (3x): 1945, 1946, 1948
- Participation in Greek Football Third Division (South): 1967, 1976

=== Table tennis ===
The club also competes in table tennis competitions, and it finished in fourth place in 1974. It produced athletes such as: Dimitrios Zikos, Giorgos Glarakis, Gerasimos Roussopoulos, and Spyros Kalogriopoulos. Roussopoulos was a member of the team that won the Atomic Greek Youth Championships in 1971, and finished second in 1972 and 1973.

In 1969, along with Spyros Kalogriopoulos, they were Greek champions in the children's doubles, as athletes of Sporting Patras.

== Gallery ==
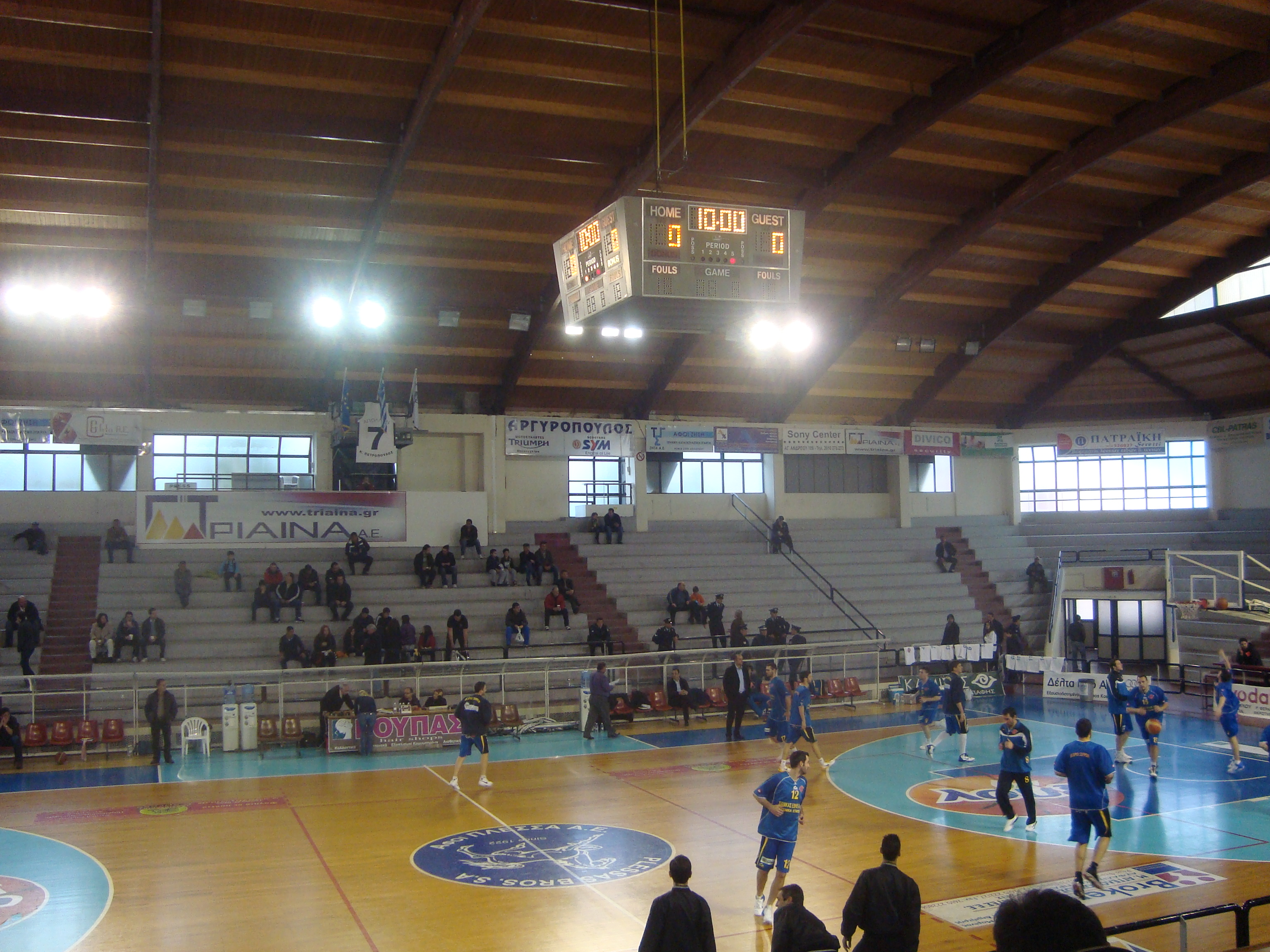
Apollon Patras Indoor Hall.

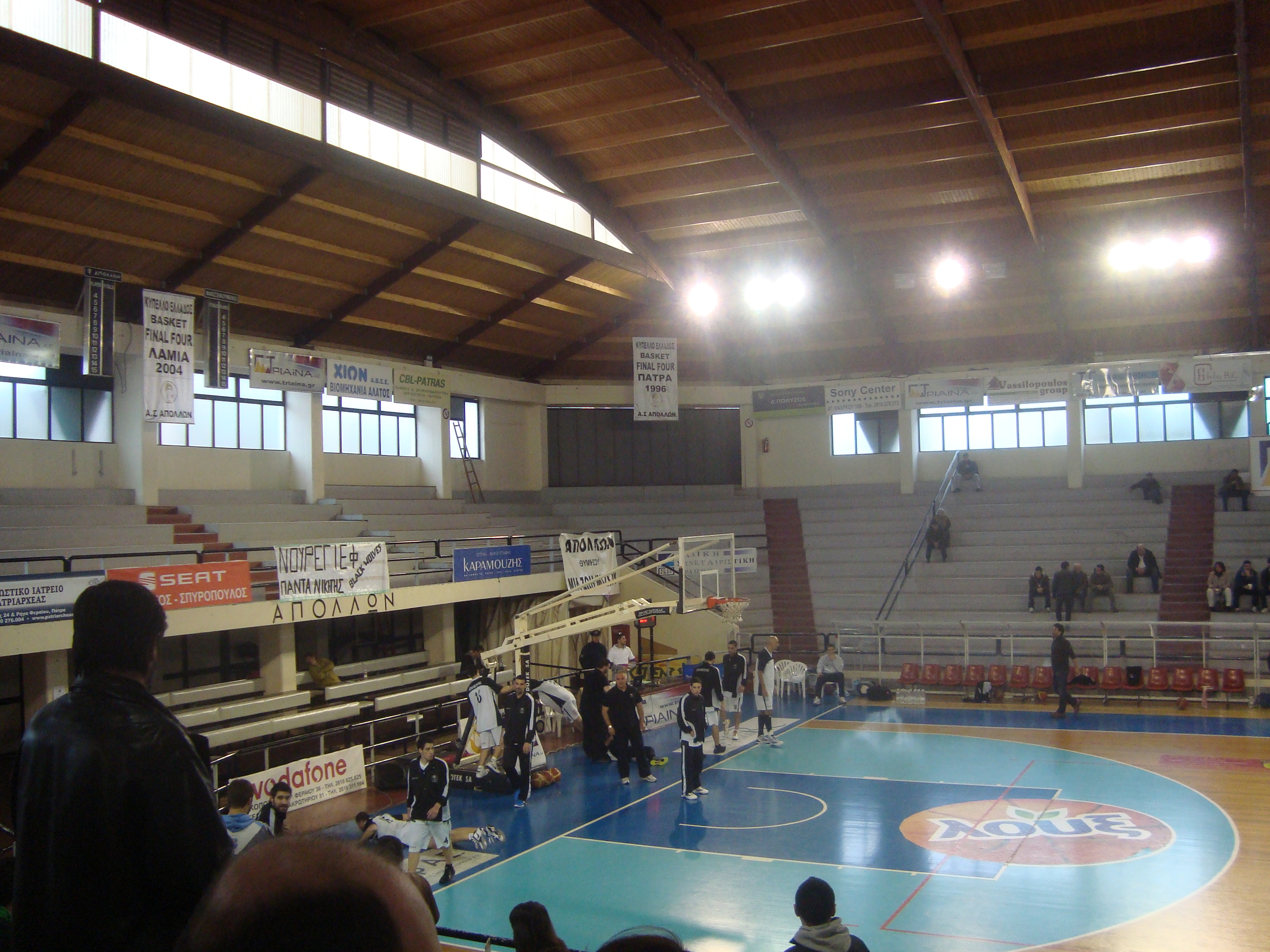
Apollon PatrasIndoor Hall, Perivola.

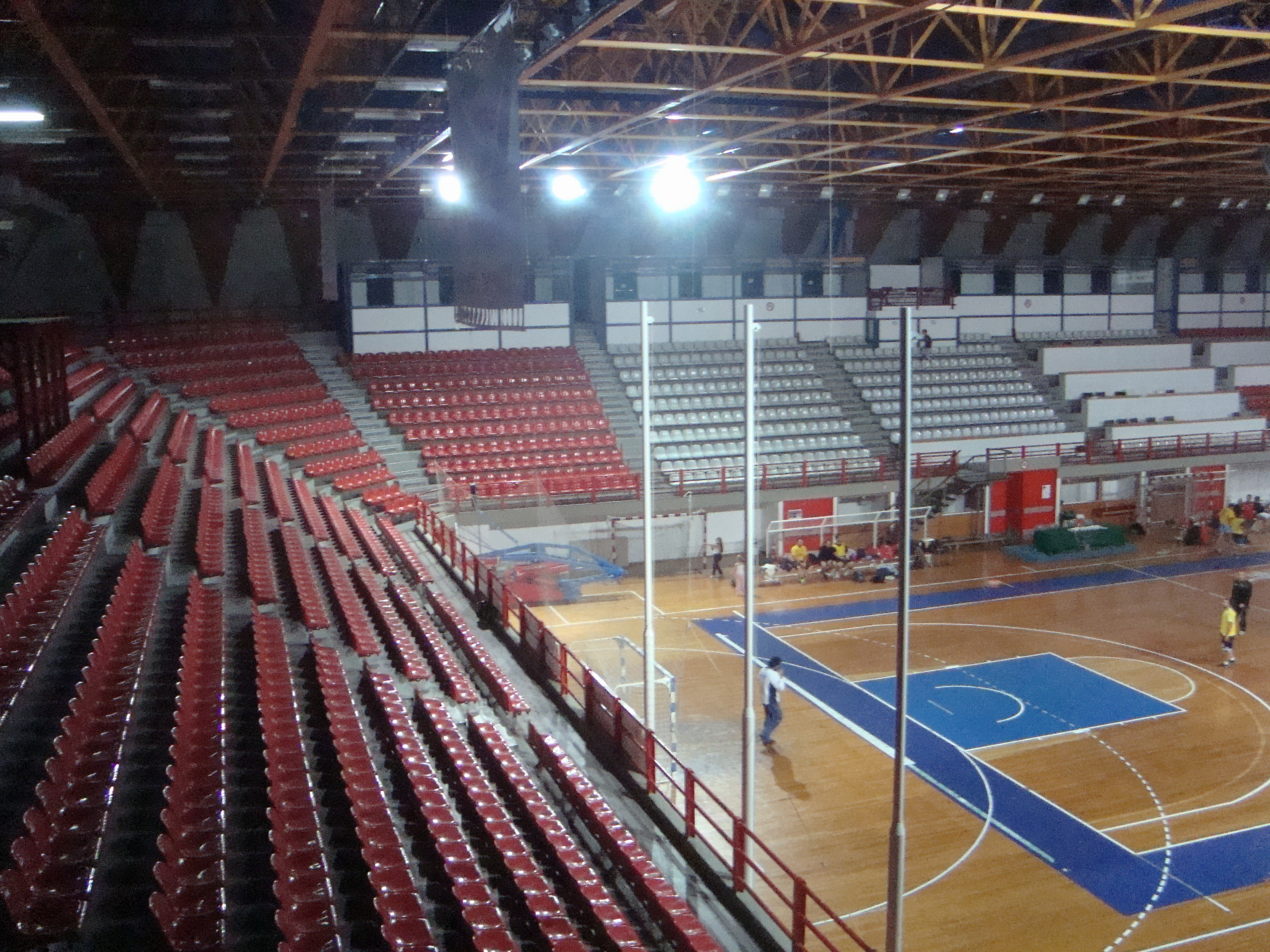
Dimitris Tofalos Arena.

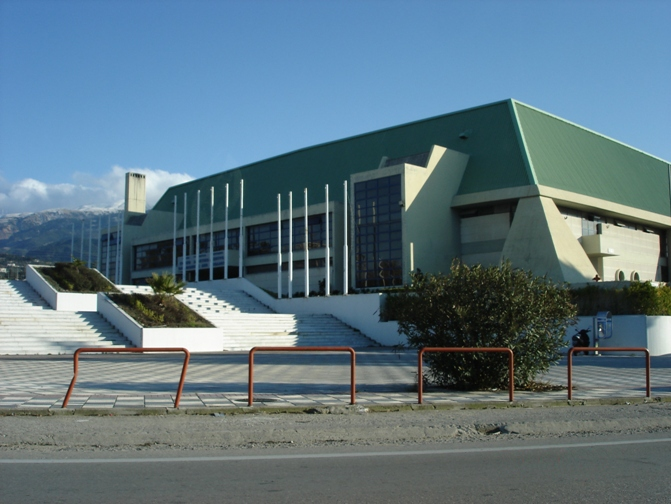
Dimitris Tofalos Arena.

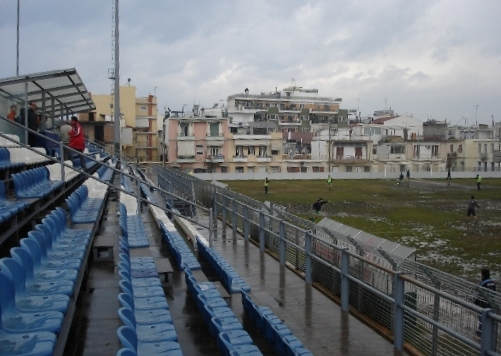
Prosfygika Stadium football field.

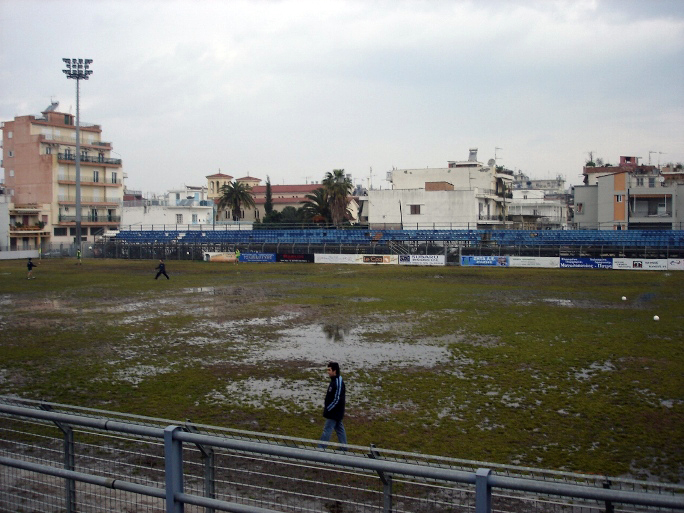
Prosfygika Stadium.

== Sources ==
- Newspapers: Peloponnisos, I Imera, Proodos, I Gnomi, Patras Spor, Neologos, Patraiki Evdomadas, Fos, Allagi, Ta Gegonota and Ethnikos Kyrix
- Lefkoma, 100 Years of Football (Soccer) in Patras – City of Patras 2006
- Axaioi3.gr
- Sportsnet.gr
- KAE Apollon Achaia-Clauss
