= Apollon Patras B.C. =

Men's basketball team in Greece

Apollon Patras Oscar
- Nickname: Φρουροί της Αχαΐας (Guards of Achaia); Μελανόλευκοι (Black-whites)
- Leagues: Greek National League 1 Greek Cup
- Founded: 1947
- History: 1947–present
- Arena: Apollon Patras Indoor Hall
- Capacity: 3,500
- Location: Patras, Greece
- Team colors: White and Black
- President: Ioannis Kontis
- Head coach: Yannis Christopoulos
- Team captain: Christos Saloustros
- Championships: 4 Greek 2nd Division
- Retired numbers: 2 (#5, #7)
- Website: apollonpatras.gr
Home	Away

Apollon Patras B.C., named after the Greek God Apollo, is a Greek professional basketball club that is located in Patras, Greece. Apollon Patras B.C. is the men's basketball club of the Greek multi sports athletic union A.S. Apollon Patras. The club's name sponsorship is Apollon Patras B.C. Carna. Currently, Apollon competes in the Greek A2 Basket League, which is the 2nd-tier level basketball division in Greece.

== History ==
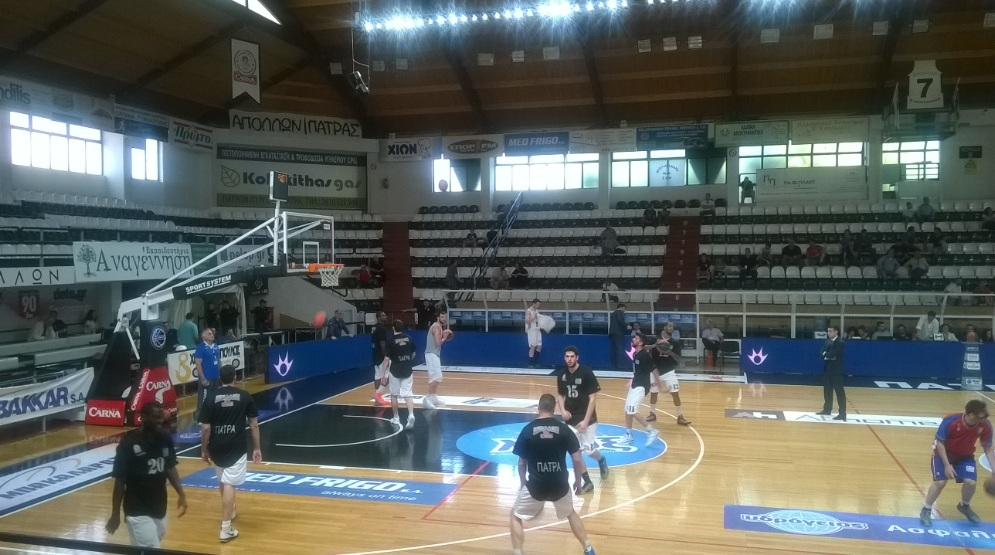
Apollon Patras warming up before their home game against Panionios, in the 2014–15 season.

The club's parent athletic club, A.S. Apollon Patras, was founded in 1926. The club's men's basketball section, Apollon Patras B.C., was founded in the year 1947. Apollon Patras B.C. has competed in the top division Greek Basket League, in a total of 32 different seasons so far, being one of the constant teams in the Greek League's top division over the years.

The club competed in the top division for the first time in the 1971–72 season. Apollon won the local Achaea regional tournament 4 times, in the years 1956, 1958, 1971, and 1973.

In the 1996–97 season, Apollon B.C. had one of its most successful seasons, finishing in the 7th place of the Greek League, and reaching the Round of 16 at the Saporta Cup. The club also made it to the final of the Greek Cup, for the first time in its history, but they were defeated by Olympiacos. In that particular season, Olympiacos had what is considered to be one of the greatest teams in European basketball history, as they had won the 1997 Triple Crown.

One more successful season followed in the 1997–98 season, in which Apollon finished in the 6th place of the Greek League, and made it to the Saporta Cup Round of 32. The following year (1998–99), the team was relegated down to the Greek A2 Basket League (Greek 2nd Division).

In 2003, Apollon B.C. won the Greek Second Division championship, and subsequently returned to the Greek first division for four straight seasons (2004 to 2007). The team was relegated to the second division again after the 2006–07 season, and returned to the top division Greek Basket League in the 2012–13 season. In that season, Apollon made the league's playoffs, and finished in 8th place in the league's final standings.

Apollon played in the 2015 Greek Cup Final, where they lost to Panathinaikos, by a score of 68–53.

== Arenas ==
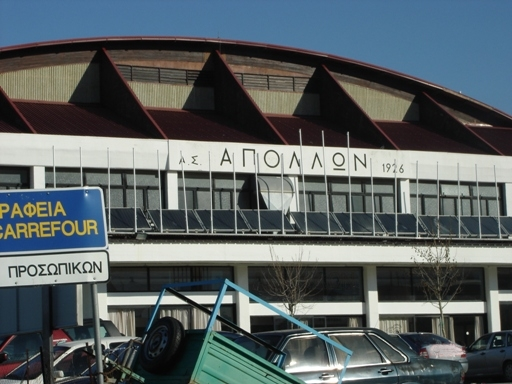
Apollon Patras Indoor Hall, in Perivola, Patras.

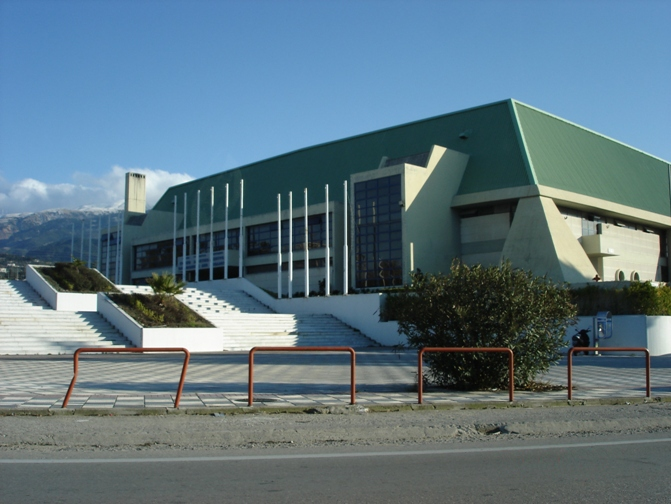
Dimitris Tofalos Arena.

Apollon Patras plays its home games at the 3,500 seat Apollon Patras Indoor Hall. They have also played home games at the Dimitris Tofalos Arena, which can seat 4,200.

== Titles and honours ==
National competitions: (11×)

- Greek League
  - Winners (3): 1927, 1948, 1956
- Greek Cup
  - Winners (4): 1951, 1964, 1970, 1973
- Greek 2nd Division (4×): 1976, 1979, 1992, 2003
  - Greek B League (2×): 1976, 1979
  - Greek A2 League (3×): 1992, 2003, 2021

Local competitions: (4×)

- Achaia Regional Championship (4×): 1956, 1958, 1971, 1973

National honours:

- Greek Cup Finalist (2×): 1997, 2015
- Greek Basket League Playoff Appearances (8×): 1988, 1989, 1990, 1996, 1997, 1998, 2013, 2014

European honours:

- FIBA Saporta Cup: Round of 16 (1997), eliminated by Türk Telekom (140–155)
- FIBA Saporta Cup: Round of 32 (1998), eliminated by Hapoel Eilat (173–180)
- FIBA Korać Cup: Round of 16 (1999), eliminated by JDA Dijon (122–135)

== Apollon Patras' season by season rankings ==
- **Bold** indicates seasons in which the club made the Greek top-tier level league's playoffs.
- Italics indicates seasons in which the club competed in levels below the Greek top-tier level.

**Season**	Greek Division	Place
1979–80	Basket League	10th
1980–81	Basket League	11th
1981–82	Basket League	10th
1982–83	Basket League	9th
1983–84	Basket League	12th
1984–85	Basket League	11th
1985–86	Basket League	6th
1986–87	Basket League	9th
1987–88	Basket League	**8th**
1988–89	Basket League	**6th**
1989–90	Basket League	**8th**

**Season**	Greek Division	Place
1990–91	Basket League	11th
1991–92	A2 Basket League	1st
1992–93	Basket League	10th
1993–94	Basket League	11th
1994–95	Basket League	11th
1995–96	Basket League	**8th**
1996–97	Basket League	**7th**
1997–98	Basket League	**6th**
1998–99	Basket League	13th
1999–00	A2 Basket League	3rd
2000–01	A2 Basket League	4th

**Season**	Greek Division	Place
2001–02	A2 Basket League	4th
2002–03	A2 Basket League	1st
2003–04	Basket League	11th
2004–05	Basket League	9th
2005–06	Basket League	10th
2006–07	Basket League	13th
2007–08	A2 Basket League	13th
2008–09	A2 Basket League	10th
2009–10	B Basket League	5th
2010–11	A2 Basket League	5th
2011–12	A2 Basket League	2nd

**Season**	Greek Division	Place
2012–13	Basket League	**8th**
2013–14	Basket League	**8th**
2014–15	Basket League	10th
2015–16	Basket League	10th
2016–17	Basket League	13th
2017–18	A2 Basket League	4th
2018–19	A2 Basket League	11th
2019–20	A2 Basket League	4th
2020–21	A2 Basket League	1st

=== Retired numbers ===
Apollon Patras retired numbers
No	Nat.	Player	Position	Tenure	Date retired
**#5**	(Greece)	Nikos Argyropoulos	PG/SG	1996–2005, 2010–2016	2019
**#7**	(Greece)	Kostas Petropoulos	SG/SF	1968–1987	2016

== Notable players ==
Note: Flags indicate national team eligibility at FIBA-sanctioned events. Players may hold other non-FIBA nationalities not displayed.

Criteria

To appear in this section a player must have either:

- Set a club record or won an individual award while at the club
- Played at least one official international match for their national team at any time
- Played at least one official NBA match at any time.

Greece:
- (Greece) Georgios Amerikanos
- (Greece) Vangelis Angelou
- (Greece) Nikos Argyropoulos
- (Greece) Nikos Barlos
- (Greece) Giorgos Bogris
- (Greece) Christos Charissis
- (Greece) Giorgos Diamantakos
- (Greece) Dimitris Dimakopoulos
- (Greece) Nikos Diplaros
- (Greece) Zois Karampelas
- (Greece) Vassilis Kikilias
- (Greece) Panagiotis Liadelis
- (Greece) Sarantis Mastrogiannopoulos
- (Greece) / (United States) Bill Melis
- (Greece) Ioannis Milonas
- (Greece) / (Canada) Elijah Mitrou-Long
- (Greece) Giannis Molfetas
- (Greece) Vassilis Mouratos
- (Greece) Christos Myriounis
- (Greece) Vassilis Niforas
- (Greece) Argiris Papapetrou
- (Greece) Kostas Petropoulos
- (Greece) Giorgos Tsalmpouris
- (Greece) Nikos Vetoulas
- (Greece) Fotios Zoumpos

Europe:

- (Bosnia and Herzegovina) Edin Bavčić
- (Kosovo) (Montenegro) Amin Hot
- (Serbia) (Turkey) Mirko Milićević
- (Montenegro) Mladen Šekularac
- (Romania) / (Greece) Gerasimos Tzakis
- (Bosnia and Herzegovina) Ratko Varda
- (Serbia) / (Greece) Dušan Vukčević

USA:

- (United States) Danya Abrams
- (United States) Ashraf Amaya
- (United States) Chad Brown
- (United States) / (Ukraine) Steve Burtt Jr.
- (United States) Orlando Coleman
- (United States) A. J. Davis
- (United States) Tony Dawson
- (United States) Pat Durham
- (United States) Harold Ellis
- (United States) Joseph Forte
- (United States) Todd Fuller
- (United States) Chris Garner
- (United States) Derrick Hamilton
- (United States) Anthony Hickey
- (United States) Buck Johnson
- (United States) Dontae' Jones
- (United States) Reggie Jordan
- (United States) Tyler Kalinoski
- (United States) Tevin Mack
- (United States) Errick McCollum
- (United States) Tre McLean
- (United States) Erik Meek
- (United States) Terence Morris
- (United States) Jimmy Oliver
- (United States) Malik Osborne
- (United States) Brandon Penn
- (United States) Mark Petteway
- (United States) Cadarian Raines
- (United States) Terrence Rencher
- (United States) Eric Riley
- (United States) Rod Sellers
- (United States) John Shasky
- (United States) Gerel Simmons
- (United States) TJ Starks
- (United States) Jamel Thomas
- (United States) Larry Turner
- (United States) Alonzo Verge Jr.
- (United States) Desi Washington

Rest of the Americas:

- (Cuba) Andrés Guibert
- (Canada) Wayne Yearwood

Oceania:

- (Australia) Andrew Gaze

== Head coaches ==
- (Greece) Kimon Agathos
- (Greece) Kostas Parisis
- (Greece) Stathis Vergos
- (Greece) Georgios Amerikanos
- (Serbia) Bata Djordjević
- (Serbia) Vojislav Vezović
- (Serbia) Rade Georgievski
- (Serbia) Kosta Jankov
- (Serbia) / (Greece) Dragan Šakota
- (Greece) Kostas Petropoulos
- (Greece) Vangelis Alexandris
- (Greece) Kostas Diamantopoulos
- (Greece) Kostas Missas
- (Germany) Dirk Bauermann
- (Greece) Georgios Kalafatakis
- (Greece) Minas Gekos
- (Serbia) Darko Ruso
- (Serbia) Miroslav Nikolić
- (Greece) Yannis Christopoulos
- (Greece) Manos Manouselis
- (Croatia) Ivica Burić
- (Greece) Kostas Keramidas
- (Greece) Dimitris Papadopoulos
- (Greece) Nikos Vetoulas
- (Greece) Thanasis Papachatzis
- (Greece) Kostas Mexas
- (Greece) Thanasis Skourtopoulos
- (Greece) Nikos Vournas
- (Greece) Kostas Delegkos

== Sponsorships ==
- Great Shirt Sponsor: LOUX
- Official Sport Clothing Manufacturer: Nickan
- Great Sponsor: Oscar
