= 2009 FIBA Under-19 World Championship =

- Official logo of the FIBA Under-19 World Championship 2009

Tournament details
- Host country: New Zealand
- City: Auckland
- Dates: 2–12 July
- Teams: 16 (from 5 confederations)
- Venues: 2 (in 1 host city)

Final positions
- Champions: United States (4th title)

Tournament statistics
- MVP: (Croatia) Mario Delaš
- Top scorer: (Puerto Rico) Rosario (24.0)
- Top rebounds: (Angola) Kiala (13.6)
- Top assists: (Croatia) Prostran (5.3)
- PPG (Team): United States (88.2)
- RPG (Team): Canada (44.1)
- APG (Team): Lithuania (17.6)

Official website
- http://newzealand2009.fiba.com/

The 2009 FIBA Under-19 World Championship (Maori: 2009 FIBA I-Raro I Te 19 Tau Toa o Te Ao) was the 9th edition of the FIBA U19 World Championship, the biennial international men's youth basketball championship contested by the U19 national teams of the member associations of FIBA. It was held in Auckland, New Zealand from 2 to 12 July 2009.

== Venues ==
Auckland		2009 FIBA Under-19 World Championship is located in New Zealand
North Shore Events Centre	ASB Stadium	2009 FIBA Under-19 World Championship is located in New Zealand
Capacity: 4,179	Capacity: 3,700	2009 FIBA Under-19 World Championship is located in New Zealand

== Qualified teams ==
Means of Qualification	Dates	Venue	Berths	Qualifiers
Host Nation	—N/a	—N/a	1	New Zealand
2008 FIBA Americas Under-18 Championship	14–18 July 2008	(Argentina) Formosa	4	Argentina; United States; Canada; Puerto Rico
2008 FIBA Europe Under-18 Championship	25 July–3 August 2008	(Greece) Amaliada / Pyrgos	5	Greece; Lithuania; Croatia; France; Spain
2008 FIBA Oceania Under-18 Championship	1–3 August 2008	(Australia) Adelaide	1	Australia
2008 FIBA Asia Under-18 Championship	28 August–5 September 2008	(Iran) Tehran	3	Iran; Kazakhstan; Syria
2008 FIBA Africa Under-18 Championship	17–26 October 2008	(Egypt) Alexandria	2	Egypt; Angola
Total			16	

== Groups ==
Group A	Group B	Group C	Group D
Angola; Greece; Lithuania; Puerto Rico	Egypt; France; Iran; United States	Australia; Canada; Spain; Syria	Argentina; Croatia; Kazakhstan; New Zealand

== Preliminary round ==
Times given below are in New Zealand Standard Time (UTC+12).

=== Group A ===
Team	Pld	W	L	PF	PA	PD	Pts	Tiebreaker
Lithuania	3	2	1	262	196	+66	5	1−1 / 1.053
Puerto Rico	3	2	1	264	229	+35	5	1−1 / 0.989
Greece	3	2	1	278	241	+37	5	1−1 / 0.967
Angola	3	0	3	153	291	−138	3	

2 July 2009
12:30

Lithuania	73–80	Puerto Rico
Scoring by quarter: 31-14, 17-25, 14-21, 11-20
Pts: Cizauskas, Redikas 15; Rebs: Motiejunas 9 Asts: Cizauskas, Slezas 4		Pts: Young, I.Sosa 18; Rebs: Young 12; Asts: Fontan 3

ASB Stadium, Auckland
Referees: Daniel Hierrezuelo (ESP), Juan Fernandez (ARG), Yuji Higashi (JPN)

2 July 2009
19:30

Greece	101–58	Angola
Scoring by quarter: 28-19, 17-8, 32-24, 24-7
Pts: Pappas 20; Rebs: Papanikolaou 9 Asts: Sloukas 4		Pts: Kiala 16; Rebs: Kiala 18; Asts: Emanuel 2

ASB Stadium, Auckland
Referees: Jeffrey Collins (USA), Olegs Latisevs (LAT), Roberto Diaz (CRC)

3 July 2009
17:00

Puerto Rico	98–107	Greece
Scoring by quarter: 32-29, 22-31, 23-19, 21-28
Pts: Rosario 28; Rebs: C.Sosa 6 Asts: Fontan 6		Pts: Papanikolaou 25; Rebs: Papanikolaou 12; Asts: Kaselakis, Pappas 5

ASB Stadium, Auckland
Referees: Carl Jungebrand (FIN), Carlos Dueñas (COL), Mohammad Alamiri (KUW)

3 July 2009
19:30

Angola	46–104	Lithuania
Scoring by quarter: 15-31, 6-27, 10-21, 15-25
Pts: Josemar 10; Rebs: Kiala 13; Asts: Gildo, Ndoniema 2		Pts: Orelik, Motiejunas 23; Rebs: Slezas 8 Asts: Simkevicus 5

ASB Stadium, Auckland
Referees: David Chambon (FRA), Arnolfo Bermeo (PHI), Arsen Andryushkin (KAZ)

4 July 2009
13:30

Angola	49–86	Puerto Rico
Scoring by quarter: 8-24, 10-22, 22-24, 9-16
Pts: Kiala 13; Rebs: Josemar 10; Asts: three players 1		Pts: Rosario 28; Rebs: C.Sosa 11; Asts: Bonefont, Fontan 3

ASB Stadium, Auckland
Referees: Jakub Zamojski (POL), Richard Stehlik (CAN), Dallas Pickering (NZL)

4 July 2009
19:30

Lithuania	85–70	Greece
Scoring by quarter: 19-17, 21-20, 18-23, 27-10
Pts: Motiejunas 28; Rebs: Motiejunas 15; Asts: Cizauskas 8		Pts: Sloukas, Mantzaris 14; Rebs: three players 6 Asts: Sloukas

ASB Stadium, Auckland
Referees: Sasa Pukl (SLO), Sinisa Herceg (CRO), Scott Beker (AUS)

=== Group B ===
Team	Pld	W	L	PF	PA	PD	Pts
United States	3	3	0	289	165	+124	6
France	3	2	1	243	195	+48	5
Egypt	3	1	2	206	305	−99	4
Iran	3	0	3	214	287	−73	3

2 July 2009
10:00

Iran	55–106	United States
Scoring by quarter: 13-30, 14-25, 14-28, 14-23
Pts: Hassanzadeh 17; Rebs: Hassanzadeh 6 Asts: Honarmand 3		Pts: Taylor 13; Rebs: Shurna 10; Asts: Gibbs, Miller 4

North Shore Events Centre, Auckland
Referees: Sinisa Herceg (CRO), Arnolfo Bermeo (PHI), Vitalis Gode (KEN)

2 July 2009
17:00

France	102–56	Egypt
Scoring by quarter: 25-12, 22-9, 24-13, 31-22
Pts: Leonard, Lang 20; Rebs: Leonard 10; Asts: Albicy 5		Pts: Elsayed 15; Rebs: Abdelkader 6 Asts: Z.Mohamed, O.Mohamed 2

ASB Stadium, Auckland
Referees: Elias Koromilas (GRE), Richard Stehlik (CAN), Dallas Pickering (NZL)

3 July 2009
10:00

United States	71–55	France
Scoring by quarter: 19-10, 16-10, 24-17, 12-18
Pts: Curry 12; Rebs: Moultrie 8 Asts: Taylor 5		Pts: Tanghe 16; Rebs: Albicy, Lang 8 Asts: Lang 3

North Shore Events Centre, Auckland
Referees: Luigi Lamonica (ITA), Scott Beker (AUS), Juan Fernandez (ARG)

3 July 2009
10:00

Egypt	95–91 (OT)	Iran
Scoring by quarter: 19-19, 19-28, 19-20, 27-17, Overtime: 11-7
Pts: Gendy 30; Rebs: Gendy 13; Asts: Gendy 4		Pts: Salmani 24; Rebs: Kazemi 18; Asts: Amjad 7

ASB Stadium, Auckland
Referees: Daniel Hierrezuelo (ESP), Tomas Jasevicius (LTU), Luis Vasquez (PUR)

4 July 2009
11:00

United States	112–55	Egypt
Scoring by quarter: 33-11, 29-13, 24-17, 26-14
Pts: Gibbs 18; Rebs: Miller 9 Asts: Gibbs 6		Pts: Oraby 15; Rebs: Oraby 8 Asts: Mobarak 4

ASB Stadium, Auckland
Referees: Yuji Higashi (JPN), Carlos Júlio (ANG), Roberto Diaz (CRC)

4 July 2009
17:00

France	86–68	Iran
Scoring by quarter: 21-23, 20-9, 26-19, 19-17
Pts: Jacques 17; Rebs: Jacques 12; Asts: Albicy 6		Pts: Salmani 25; Rebs: Kazemi 10; Asts: Kazemi 5

ASB Stadium, Auckland
Referees: Olegs Latisevs (LAT), Arsen Andryushkin (KAZ), Carlos Dueñas (COL)

=== Group C ===
Team	Pld	W	L	PF	PA	PD	Pts
Australia	3	3	0	253	193	+60	6
Spain	3	2	1	223	197	+26	5
Canada	3	1	2	251	223	+28	4
Syria	3	0	3	160	274	−114	3

2 July 2009
12:30

Spain	79–53	Syria
Scoring by quarter: 23-14, 13-11, 26-13, 17-15
Pts: Santana 16; Rebs: Sosa 8 Asts: Hernandez 4		Pts: Al Samman 13; Rebs: Al-Hamwi 7 Asts: three players 2

North Shore Events Centre, Auckland
Referees: Luigi Lamonica (ITA), Arsen Andryushkin (KAZ), Carlos Júlio (ANG)

2 July 2009
17:00

Canada	77–88	Australia
Scoring by quarter: 18-24, 16-18, 22-24, 21-22
Pts: Arop 27; Rebs: Arop 11; Asts: three players 1		Pts: Ellis 25; Rebs: Young 9 Asts: Dellavedova 4

North Shore Events Centre, Auckland
Referees: Carl Jungebrand (FIN), Jakub Zamojski (POL), David Chambon (FRA)

3 July 2009
12:30

Syria	53–99	Canada
Scoring by quarter: 13-23, 18-14, 11-36, 11-26
Pts: Adribe 12; Rebs: Adribe 5 Asts: Al Nour 2		Pts: three players 13; Rebs: Baker, Thompson 10; Asts: Nurse 6

ASB Stadium, Auckland
Referees: Sinisa Herceg (CRO), Dallas Pickering (NZL), Olegs Latisevs (LAT)

3 July 2009
17:00

Australia	69–62	Spain
Scoring by quarter: 20-11, 13-12, 22-18, 14-21
Pts: Broekhoff 16; Rebs: Broekhoff 7 Asts: Dellavedova 3		Pts: Vicens 17; Rebs: Muñoz 8 Asts: Pérez 4

North Shore Events Centre, Auckland
Referees: Sasa Pukl (SLO), Jeffrey Collins (USA), Yuji Higashi (JPN)

4 July 2009
11:00

Syria	54–96	Australia
Scoring by quarter: 12-17, 17-26, 15-19, 10-24
Pts: Asfirh 20; Rebs: Bawadekji 6 Asts: Al Jabe 3		Pts: Hodgson 17; Rebs: Arnott 8 Asts: Arnott 4

North Shore Events Centre, Auckland
Referees: Elias Koromilas (GRE), Juan Fernandez (ARG), Vitalis Gode (KEN)

4 July 2009
17:00

Canada	75–82	Spain
Scoring by quarter: 12-23, 21-15, 20-24, 22-20
Pts: Arop 17; Rebs: Olynyk 13; Asts: Olynyk, Nurse 2		Pts: Pérez 29; Rebs: Vicens 5 Asts: Santana 4

North Shore Events Centre, Auckland
Referees: Luis Vazquez (PUR), Tomas Jasevicius (LTU), Mohammad Alamiri (KUW)

=== Group D ===
Team	Pld	W	L	PF	PA	PD	Pts
Croatia	3	3	0	258	209	+49	6
Argentina	3	2	1	227	208	+19	5
Kazakhstan	3	1	2	233	285	−52	4
New Zealand	3	0	3	219	235	−16	3

2 July 2009
10:00

Croatia	104–74	Kazakhstan
Scoring by quarter: 26-16, 32-22, 20-17, 26-19
Pts: Prostran 23; Rebs: Bilinovac 8 Asts: Prostran 6		Pts: Tyutyunik 21; Rebs: Zhigulin 9 Asts: Ismail 5

ASB Stadium, Auckland
Referees: Luis Vazquez (PUR), Scott Beker (AUS), Carlos Dueñas (COL)

2 July 2009
20:30

Argentina	66–64	New Zealand
Scoring by quarter: 17-16, 14-19, 15-14, 20-15
Pts: Nocedal 21; Rebs: Fernández 8 Asts: Fernández 4		Pts: Ruscoe 22; Rebs: Prewster 8 Asts: Loe 3

North Shore Events Centre, Auckland
Referees: Sasa Pukl (SLO), Tomas Jasevicius (LTU), Mohammad Alamiri (KUW)

3 July 2009
12:30

Kazakhstan	69–98	Argentina
Scoring by quarter: 11-21, 20-24, 19-21, 19-32
Pts: Tyutyunik 23; Rebs: Tyutyunik 9 Asts: Tuleu 6		Pts: González 16; Rebs: Rasio 12; Asts: Fernández 5

North Shore Events Centre, Auckland
Referees: Elias Koromilas (GRE), Roberto José Diaz (CRC), Vitalis Gode (KEN)

3 July 2009
19:30

New Zealand	72–79	Croatia
Scoring by quarter: 16-18, 15-20, 24-24, 17-17
Pts: Edwards 29; Rebs: Edwards 9 Asts: Van Beek 5		Pts: Delaš 31; Rebs: Delaš 14; Asts: Prostran 6

North Shore Events Centre, Auckland
Referees: Richard Stehlik(CAN), Jakub Zamojski (POL), Carlos Júlio (ANG)

4 July 2009
13:30

Croatia	75–63	Argentina
Scoring by quarter: 8-18, 21-6, 29-20, 17-19
Pts: Delaš 27; Rebs: Zubčić 9 Asts: Batur 3		Pts: Rasio, Nocedal 11; Rebs: Rasio, Glinberg 7 Asts: Fernández 5

North Shore Events Centre, Auckland
Referees: Luigi Lamonica (ITA), Jeffrey Collins (USA), Arnolfo Bermeo (PHI)

4 July 2009
19:30

New Zealand	83–90	Kazakhstan
Scoring by quarter: 22-19, 20-27, 25-14, 16-30
Pts: Ruscoe, Loe 20; Rebs: Edwards 7 Asts: three players 3		Pts: Arsenyev 27; Rebs: Tyutyunik 8 Asts: Ismail 8

North Shore Events Centre, Auckland
Referees: Carl Jungebrand (FIN), Daniel Hierrezuelo (ESP), David Chambon (FRA)

== Eighth-final round ==
Times given below are in New Zealand Standard Time (UTC+12).

Results between preliminary groupmates carry over.

=== Group E ===
Team	Pld	W	L	PF	PA	PD	Pts	Tiebreaker
United States	6	6	0	532	364	+168	12	
Greece	6	4	2	523	457	+66	10	1−0
Puerto Rico	6	4	2	514	471	+43	10	0−1
France	6	3	3	499	439	+60	9	1−0
Lithuania	6	3	3	503	440	+63	9	0−1
Egypt	6	1	5	409	598	−189	7	

6 July 2009
17:00

France	89–90	Puerto Rico
Scoring by quarter: 27-21, 9-26, 27-16, 26-27
Pts: Albicy 28; Rebs: Leonard 9 Asts: Albicy 3		Pts: Rosario 54; Rebs: Rosario, C.Sosa 7 Asts: Young 5

North Shore Events Centre, Auckland
Referees: Sinisa Herceg (CRO), Scott Beker (AUS), Carlos Júlio (ANG)

6 July 2009
19:30

Egypt	73–94	Lithuania
Scoring by quarter: 25-27, 15-15, 11-28, 22-24
Pts: Gendy 26; Rebs: Gendy 9 Asts: Okasha 3		Pts: Bertasius 24; Rebs: Motiejunas 10; Asts: Cizauskas 10

ASB Stadium, Auckland
Referees: Jakub Zamojski (POL), Olegs Latisevs (LAT), Vitalis Gode (KEN)

6 July 2009
19:30

United States	85–69	Greece
Scoring by quarter: 18-17, 23-19, 22-17, 22-16
Pts: Thompkins 22; Rebs: Curry 6 Asts: Mack, Thompson 3		Pts: Pappas 11; Rebs: four players 4 Asts: Pappas 4

North Shore Events Centre, Auckland
Referees: Daniel Hierrezuelo (ESP), Richard Stehlik (CAN), Dallas Pickering (NZL)

7 July 2009
17:00

Greece	100–59	Egypt
Scoring by quarter: 37-17, 22-5, 17-14, 24-23
Pts: Pappas 18; Rebs: Karathanasis 9 Asts: Kaselakis 5		Pts: Elsayed 16; Rebs: Oraby 10; Asts: O.Mohamed 2

ASB Stadium, Auckland
Referees: Sinisa Herceg (CRO), Scott Beker (AUS), Vitalis Gode (KEN)

7 July 2009
17:00

Lithuania	78–95	France
Scoring by quarter: 18-23, 16-34, 28-19, 16-19
Pts: Drungilas 24; Rebs: Drungilas 9 Asts: three players 3		Pts: Leonard 22; Rebs: Ramassamy 11; Asts: Albicy 6

North Shore Events Centre, Auckland
Referees: Daniel Hierrezuelo (ESP), Roberto José Diaz (CRC), Mohammad Alamiri (KUW)

7 July 2009
19:30

Puerto Rico	61–82	United States
Scoring by quarter: 13-20, 6-23, 21-17, 21-22
Pts: Fontan 16; Rebs: Nirenberg 13; Asts: Fontan 4		Pts: Thompkins 14; Rebs: Thompkins 9 Asts: Taylor 5

North Shore Events Centre, Auckland
Referees: Luigi Lamonica (ITA), Juan Fernandez (ARG), Arsen Andryushkin (KAZ)

8 July 2009
11:00

Egypt	71–99	Puerto Rico
Scoring by quarter: 16-27, 14-25, 20-29, 21-18
Pts: Gendy 22; Rebs: Oraby 9 Asts: Gendy 3		Pts: Rosario 22; Rebs: Vazquez, C.Sosa 7 Asts: Fontan 10

ASB Stadium, Auckland
Referees: Sasa Pukl (SLO), Mohammad Alamiri (KUW), Arnolfo Bermeo (PHI)

8 July 2009
13:30

France	72–76	Greece
Scoring by quarter: 13-21, 14-21, 13-18, 32-16
Pts: Bourhis 17; Rebs: Leonard 8 Asts: Albicy 6		Pts: Pappas 20; Rebs: Kaselakis, Papanikolaou 9 Asts: Sloukas 5

ASB Stadium, Auckland
Referees: Juan Fernandez (ARG), Olegs Latisevs (LAT), Yuji Higashi (JPN)

8 July 2009
19:30

United States	76–69	Lithuania
Scoring by quarter: 18-16, 18-20, 19-15, 21-18
Pts: Taylor 13; Rebs: Hayward 8 Asts: Taylor 4		Pts: Slezas 21; Rebs: Slezas 12; Asts: Cizauskas 5

North Shore Events Centre, Auckland
Referees: Carl Jungebrand (FIN), Carlos Dueñas (COL), Scott Beker (AUS)

=== Group F ===
Team	Pld	W	L	PF	PA	PD	Pts	Tiebreaker
Australia	6	6	0	495	386	109	12	
Croatia	6	5	1	506	437	69	11	
Argentina	6	3	3	441	426	15	9	1−1 / 1.049
Canada	6	3	3	503	433	70	9	1−1 / 1.022
Spain	6	3	3	471	451	20	9	1−1 / 0.940
Kazakhstan	6	1	5	428	581	−153	7	

6 July 2009
11:00

Croatia	83–77	Canada
Scoring by quarter: 18-11, 25-20, 7-23, 33-23
Pts: Prostran 29; Rebs: Zubčić 11; Asts: Prostran 6		Pts: Joseph 24; Rebs: Joseph, Baker 8 Asts: Joseph 3

North Shore Events Centre, Auckland
Referees: Elias Koromilas (GRE), Yuji Higashi (JPN), Roberto José Diaz (CRC)

6 July 2009
13:30

Argentina	92–75	Spain
Scoring by quarter: 24-22, 14-20, 21-15, 33-18
Pts: Nocedal 22; Rebs: Rasio 13; Asts: González 7		Pts: Pérez 19; Rebs: Vicens 9 Asts: Pérez 3

North Shore Events Centre, Auckland
Referees: Carl Jungebrand (FIBA), David Chambon (FRA), Luis Vazquez (PUR)

6 July 2009
17:00

Kazakhstan	54–87	Australia
Scoring by quarter: 9-22, 13-21, 18-27, 14-17
Pts: Tyutyunik 20; Rebs: Akhmet, Zhigulin 7 Asts: Tuleu 6		Pts: Motum, Cadee 17; Rebs: Hodgson 12; Asts: Cadee, Broekhoff 3

ASB Stadium, Auckland
Referees: Luigi Lamonica (ITA), Arnolfo Bermeo (PHI), Mohammad Alamiri (KUW)

7 July 2009
11:00

Spain	72–91	Croatia
Scoring by quarter: 14-18, 16-20, 28-21, 14-32
Pts: Vicens 18; Rebs: Vicens 9 Asts: Pérez 5		Pts: Radošević 22; Rebs: Zubčić 12; Asts: Prostran 7

North Shore Events Centre, Auckland
Referees: Jeffrey Collins (USA), Elias Koromilas (GRE), Carlos Dueñas (COL)

7 July 2009
13:30

Australia	76–65	Argentina
Scoring by quarter: 25-9, 23-26, 12-19, 16-11
Pts: three players 16; Rebs: Ellis 8 Asts: Page 3		Pts: González 14; Rebs: Rasio 9 Asts: Fernández 3

North Shore Events Centre, Auckland
Referees: Sasa Pukl (SLO), Jakub Zamojski (POL), Olegs Latisevs (LAT)

7 July 2009
19:30

Canada	108–70	Kazakhstan
Scoring by quarter: 30-18, 22-21, 28-15, 28-16
Pts: Nurse 25; Rebs: Baker 10; Asts: Nurse 3		Pts: Tyutyunik 19; Rebs: Zhigulin 6 Asts: Ismail 8

ASB Stadium, Auckland
Referees: David Chambon (FRA), Tomas Jasevicius (LTU), Dallas Pickering (NZL)

8 July 2009
11:00

Kazakhstan	71–101	Spain
Scoring by quarter: 16-27, 15-24, 20-27, 20-23
Pts: Zhigulin 13; Rebs: Zhigulin 8 Asts: Tuleu 4		Pts: Santana 26; Rebs: Gil 13; Asts: Hernandez 7

North Shore Events Centre, Auckland
Referees: Luigi Lamonica (ITA), Jakub Zamojski (POL), Roberto Diaz (CRC)

8 July 2009
13:30

Argentina	57–67	Canada
Scoring by quarter: 17-21, 17-15, 11-18, 12-13
Pts: Rasio 14; Rebs: Rasio 7 Asts: Fernández, Cortes 2		Pts: Joseph 20; Rebs: Olynyk 7 Asts: Olynyk 3

North Shore Events Centre, Auckland
Referees: Jeffrey Collins (USA), Elias Koromilas (GRE), Carlos Júlio (ANG)

8 July 2009
17:00

Croatia	74–79	Australia
Scoring by quarter: 24-19, 13-15, 17-21, 20-24
Pts: Zubčić, Prostran 14; Rebs: Zubčić 8 Asts: Prostran 4		Pts: Dellavedova 17; Rebs: Cadee 7 Asts: three players 2

North Shore Events Centre, Auckland
Referees: David Chambon (FRA), Richard Stehlik (CAN), Tomas Jasevicius (LTU)

== Knockout round ==
=== Championship ===
Quarter-finals
10 July – Auckland
Greece	86
Argentina	60
10 July – Auckland
France	73
Australia	79
10 July – Auckland
Puerto Rico	78
Croatia	91
10 July – Auckland
United States	93
Canada	73

Semi-finals
11 July – Auckland
Greece	84
Australia	69
11 July – Auckland
Croatia	77
United States	81

Final
12 July – Auckland
Greece	80
United States	88
Third place
12 July – Auckland
Australia	81
Croatia	87

=== 5th–8th playoffs ===
Semi-finals
11 July – Auckland
Argentina	92
France	84
11 July – Auckland
Puerto Rico	67
Canada	65

Fifth place
12 July – Auckland
Argentina	92
Puerto Rico	70
Seventh place
12 July – Auckland
France	74
Canada	82

=== 9th–12th playoffs ===
Semi-finals
10 July – Auckland
Lithuania	113
Kazakhstan	79
10 July – Auckland
Egypt	73
Spain	88

Ninth place
11 July – Auckland
Lithuania	88
Spain	64
Eleventh place
11 July – Auckland
Kazakhstan	78
Egypt	86

=== 13th–16th playoffs ===
Semi-finals
6 July – Auckland
Angola	62
Iran	53
6 July – Auckland
Syria	75
New Zealand	93

Thirteenth place
7 July – Auckland
Angola	54
New Zealand	62
Fifteenth place
7 July – Auckland
Iran	93
Syria	53

=== Quarterfinals ===
10 July 2009
13:30

Greece	86–60	Argentina
Scoring by quarter: 25-17, 16-15, 18-10, 27-18
Pts: Kaselakis 20; Rebs: Kaselakis 8 Asts: Papantoniou 5		Pts: Ramírez 10; Rebs: Ramírez, Landoni, Rasio 6 Asts: González 2

North Shore Events Centre, Auckland

10 July 2009
16:00

France	73–79	Australia
Scoring by quarter: 20-17, 15-28, 18-13, 20-21
Pts: Leonard 22; Rebs: Leonard 13; Asts: Bourhis 4		Pts: Dellavedova 18; Rebs: Ellis 10; Asts: Ellis, Young 3

North Shore Events Centre, Auckland

10 July 2009
18:15

Puerto Rico	78–91	Croatia
Scoring by quarter: 19-20, 14-25, 24-19, 21-27
Pts: Rosario 25; Rebs: López, Rosario 7 Asts: Fontan 4		Pts: Zubčić 27; Rebs: Delaš 10; Asts: Prostran 8

North Shore Events Centre, Auckland

10 July 2009
20:30

United States	93–73	Canada
Scoring by quarter: 25-15, 26-21, 21-18, 21-19
Pts: Hayward 20; Rebs: Moultrie 11; Asts: Taylor 7		Pts: Thompson 18; Rebs: Thompson 8 Asts: Nurse, Joseph 3

North Shore Events Centre, Auckland

=== Semifinals ===
6 July 2009
11:00

13th–16th

Angola	62–53	Iran
Scoring by quarter: 11-23, 14-11, 25-9, 12-10
Pts: Ferreira 19; Rebs: Kiala 20; Asts: Antonio 5		Pts: Kazemi 19; Rebs: Kazemi 20; Asts: Salmani, Kazemi 2

ASB Stadium, Auckland

6 July 2009
13:30

13th–16th

Syria	75–93	New Zealand
Scoring by quarter: 21-33, 20-18, 12-28, 22-14
Pts: Al-Jabe 15; Rebs: Adribe, Gneed 5 Asts: Al-Jabe, Gneed 2		Pts: Loe 25; Rebs: Loe 9 Asts: Loe 4

ASB Stadium, Auckland

10 July 2009
9:00

9th–12th

Lithuania	113–79	Kazakhstan
Scoring by quarter: 33-11, 26-28, 32-21, 22-19
Pts: Bendžius 21; Rebs: Orelik 11; Asts: Sapiega 6		Pts: Tyutyunik 20; Rebs: Tyutyunik, Zhigulin 6 Asts: Ismail 3

North Shore Events Centre, Auckland

10 July 2009
11:15

9th–12th

Egypt	73–88	Spain
Scoring by quarter: 20-16, 17-27, 16-22, 20-23
Pts: Abdelhalim 17; Rebs: Oraby 12; Asts: Ashmawy 4		Pts: Vicens 18; Rebs: Gil 11; Asts: Santana 5

North Shore Events Centre, Auckland

11 July 2009
13:30

5th–8th

Argentina	92–84	France
Scoring by quarter: 15-22, 23-22, 26-25, 28-15
Pts: Nocedal 20; Rebs: Rasio 13; Asts: Laprovittola 4		Pts: Albicy 24; Rebs: Leonard 7 Asts: Albicy 6

North Shore Events Centre, Auckland

11 July 2009
16:00

5th–8th

Puerto Rico	67–65	Canada
Scoring by quarter: 18-20, 16-15, 20-12, 13-18
Pts: Fontan 16; Rebs: López 10; Asts: Fontan 4		Pts: Arop 20; Rebs: Baker, Thompson 11; Asts: Baker 3

North Shore Events Centre, Auckland

11 July 2009
18:15

Semis

Greece	84–69	Australia
Scoring by quarter: 24-18, 22-15, 21-14, 17-22
Pts: Pappas 19; Rebs: Kaselakis 13; Asts: Mantzaris 6		Pts: Page 15; Rebs: Young 10; Asts: Dellavedova 3

North Shore Events Centre, Auckland

11 July 2009
20:30

Semis

Croatia	77–81	United States
Scoring by quarter: 16-22, 17-24, 26-11, 18-24
Pts: Delaš 17; Rebs: Zubčić 8 Asts: Prostran 7		Pts: Hayward 15; Rebs: Thompkins 9 Asts: Taylor, Mack 3

North Shore Events Centre, Auckland

=== Finals ===
7 July 2009
11:00

15th/16th

Iran	93–53	Syria
Scoring by quarter: 25-20, 26-11, 30-6, 12-16
Pts: Amjad 29; Rebs: Farman 11; Asts: Falahat 7		Pts: Al-Jabe 14; Rebs: Osaifira 9 Asts: Al-Jabe, Al-Shatti 2

ASB Stadium, Auckland

7 July 2009
13:30

13th/14th

Angola	54–62	New Zealand
Scoring by quarter: 10-15, 11-16, 12-12, 21-19
Pts: Kiala 16; Rebs: Kiala 12; Asts: Ndoniema 4		Pts: Ruscoe 20; Rebs: Loe 9 Asts: Ruscoe, Prewster 3

ASB Stadium, Auckland

11 July 2009
9:00

11th/12th

Kazakhstan	78–86	Egypt
Scoring by quarter: 18-19, 25-13, 15-27, 20-27
Pts: Tyutyunik 20; Rebs: Zhigulin 13; Asts: Ismail 5		Pts: Abdelhalim 32; Rebs: Abdelhalim 14; Asts: Mobarak 4

North Shore Events Centre, Auckland

11 July 2009
11:15

9th/10th

Lithuania	88–64	Spain
Scoring by quarter: 22-15, 21-13, 24-22, 21-14
Pts: Orelik 30; Rebs: Orelik 9 Asts: Sapiega 6		Pts: Sosa 13; Rebs: Vicens 10; Asts: Pérez 5

North Shore Events Centre, Auckland

12 July 2009
11:00

7th/8th

France	74–82	Canada
Scoring by quarter: 20-21, 15-17, 18-19, 21-25
Pts: Lang 19; Rebs: Leonard 8 Asts: Albicy 5		Pts: Joseph 18; Rebs: Olynyk 14; Asts: Joseph, Olynyk 3

North Shore Events Centre, Auckland

12 July 2009
13:30

5th/6th

Argentina	92–70	Puerto Rico
Scoring by quarter: 21-15, 20-15, 25-25, 26-15
Pts: Landoni 17; Rebs: Fernández, Rasio 8 Asts: Fernández, Laprovittola 7		Pts: Rosario 21; Rebs: López 6 Asts: Fontan 7

North Shore Events Centre, Auckland

12 July 2009
17:00

3rd/4th

Australia	81–87	Croatia
Scoring by quarter: 20-28, 25-18, 15-20, 21-21
Pts: Young 15; Rebs: Broekhoff 7 Asts: Dellavedova 4		Pts: Delaš 28; Rebs: Prostran 7 Asts: Prostran 4

North Shore Events Centre, Auckland

12 July 2009
19:30

Final

Greece	80–88	United States
Scoring by quarter: 19-19, 11-27, 21-14, 29-28
Pts: Sloukas 17; Rebs: Kaselakis 6 Asts: Sloukas 4		Pts: Taylor 18; Rebs: Moultrie 9 Asts: Taylor 6

North Shore Events Centre, Auckland

== Final standings ==
Rank	Team
1st place, gold medalist(s)	United States
2nd place, silver medalist(s)	Greece
3rd place, bronze medalist(s)	Croatia
4th	Australia
5th	Argentina
6th	Puerto Rico
7th	Canada
8th	France
9th	Lithuania
10th	Spain
11th	Egypt
12th	Kazakhstan
13th	New Zealand
14th	Angola
15th	Iran
16th	Syria

== Awards ==
2009 Under-19 World Championship winner

United States
Fourth title

Most Valuable Player
(Croatia) Mario Delaš

All-Tournament Team

- (Croatia) Toni Prostran
- (United States) Tyshawn Taylor
- (Greece) Nikos Pappas
- (United States) Gordon Hayward
- (Croatia) Mario Delaš

== Statistical leaders ==
Points

Name	PPG
(Puerto Rico) Michael Rosario	24.0
(Croatia) Mario Delaš	20.0
(Kazakhstan) Alexandr Tyutyunik	19.4
(Egypt) Amro Sherif Abdelhalim	19.0
(New Zealand) Robert Loe	18.8

Rebounds

Name	RPG
(Angola) Miguel Kiala	13.6
(Iran) Arsalan Kazemi	12.2
(Argentina) Lisandro Rasio	9.0
(Egypt) Omar Tarek Oraby	8.4
(Canada) Kelly Olynyk	8.3

Assists

Name	APG
(Croatia) Toni Prostran	5.3
(Puerto Rico) Jiovanny Fontan	5.0
(Lithuania) Vytenis Čižauskas	5.0
(Kazakhstan) Berik Ismail	4.9
(France) Andrew Albicy	4.7

Steals

Name	SPG
(Iran) Arsalan Kazemi	4.0
(France) Andrew Albicy	3.3
(New Zealand) Robert Loe	3.0
(Syria) Tarek Al-Jabe	2.8
(Angola) Eduardo Ferreira	2.8

Blocks

Name	BPG
(Iran) Farbod Farman	2.6
(Greece) Kostas Papanikolaou	2.3
(Iran) Arsalan Kazemi	2.0
(Puerto Rico) Carlos López	1.7
(Canada) Mike Allison	1.6
