= Zisis Sarikopoulos =

Greek basketball player (born 1990)

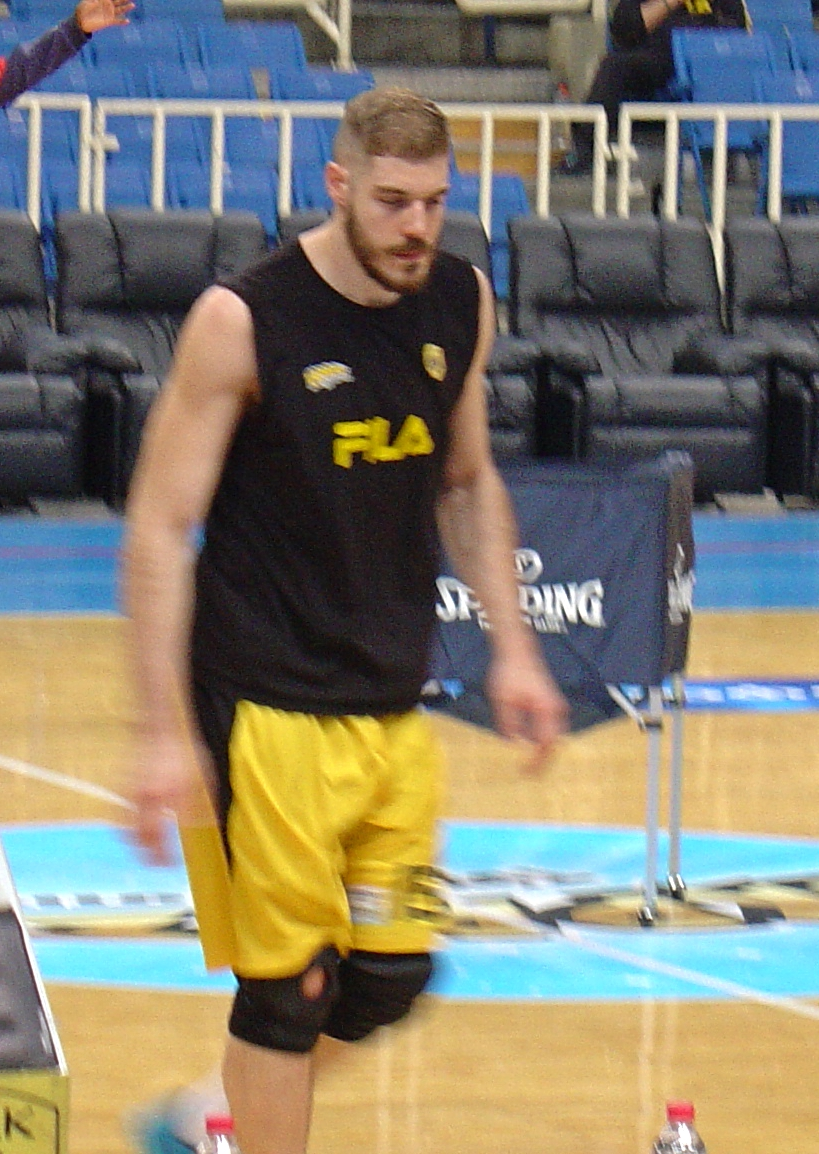
- Sarikopoulos with AEK Athens, in 2016.

Iraklis

Personal information
- Born: March 31, 1990 (age 36) Athens, Greece
- Listed height: 7 ft 0 in (2.13 m)
- Listed weight: 265 lb (120 kg)

Career information
- College: UAB (2007–2008); Ohio State (2009–2010)
- NBA draft: 2010: undrafted
- Playing career: 2010–present

Career history
- 2010–2012: Panionios
- 2012–2014: Aris
- 2014–2016: AEK
- 2016–2017: Promitheas Patras
- 2017–2018: Panionios
- 2018–2019: Tsmoki-Minsk
- 2019–2020: PAOK
- 2021: Iraklis Thessaloniki
- 2021–2022: Al Sadd
- 2022: PAOK
- 2022–2023: Karditsa
- 2023–: Iraklis
Medals
Men's basketball
Representing Greece
FIBA Europe Under-20 Championship
Gold medal – first place	2009 Greece	U-20 Team
Silver medal – second place	2010 Croatia	U-20 Team
FIBA Under-19 World Cup
Silver medal – second place	2009 New Zealand	U-19 Team
FIBA Europe Under-18 Championship
Gold medal – first place	2008 Greece	U-18 Team
Silver medal – second place	2007 Spain	U-18 Team

Zisis Sarikopoulos (alternate spelling: Zissis) (Greek: Ζήσης Σαρικόπουλος; born March 31, 1990, in Athens, Greece) is a Greek professional basketball player. He is 7 ft 0 in (2.13 m) tall, and he played at the center position. His nickname is "Big Z".

== Early years ==
Sarikopoulos began playing basketball with the youth teams of the Greek club Olympiacos. He played at the 2007 Jordan Brand Classic International game.

== College career ==
Sarikopoulos played college basketball at UAB, with the UAB Blazers, and at Ohio State, with the Ohio State Buckeyes. He left Ohio State early, to play pro basketball in Greece. Sarikopoulos averaged 1.35 points per game in his NCAA Division I career.

== Professional career ==
In 2010, Sarikopoulos began his professional career with the Greek League club Panionios. In 2012, he moved to the Greek club Aris. In 2014, he joined the Greek club AEK Athens.

On July 17, 2016, Sarikopoulos signed with the Greek team Promitheas Patras. He returned to Panionios for the 2017–18 season.

On August 22, 2018, Sarikopoulos signed with the Belarusian team Tsmoki-Minsk.

On August 30, 2019, he signed with PAOK of the Greek Basket League.

On March 11, 2021, he signed with Iraklis of the Greek Basket League.

On October 5, 2021, he signed with Al Sadd of the Qatari Basketball League (QBL).

On November 10, 2022, Sarikopoulos returned to PAOK for the rest of the season. He left the club after appearing in only two games and instead joined Karditsa. In 12 league games, he averaged 1.8 points and 2.6 rebounds in 9 minutes per contest.

On June 11, 2024, Sarikopoulos announced his retirement from professional basketball, transitioning into the role of the general manager for his last club Iraklis.

== National team career ==
Sarikopoulos was a member of the Greek junior national teams. With the junior national teams of Greece, he played at the following tournaments: the 2005 FIBA Europe Under-16 Championship, the 2006 FIBA Europe Under-16 Championship, the 2007 FIBA Europe Under-18 Championship, the 2008 FIBA Europe Under-18 Championship the 2009 FIBA Under-19 World Championship, the 2009 FIBA Europe Under-20 Championship, and the 2010 FIBA Europe Under-20 Championship.

In 2012, he was invited to practice with the senior men's Greek national basketball team, for the first time. In 2015, he was invited as a training camp player of the Greek senior men's national team for the first time.

== Career statistics ==
=== Domestic Leagues ===
==== Regular season ====
Legend
GP	Games played	MPG	Minutes per game	FG%	Field goal percentage
3P%	3-point field goal percentage	FT%	Free throw percentage	RPG	Rebounds per game
APG	Assists per game	SPG	Steals per game	BPG	Blocks per game
PPG	Points per game	**Bold**	Career high		Led the league

Note 1: Only games in the domestic competitions are included. Therefore, games in European competitions are left out.

Note 2: 2021-22 Games of Qatar Basket League, Qatar Cap and H.H. Amir Cap are included. Stats updated on April 4th, 2022.

Year	Team	League	GP	MPG	FG%	3P%	FT%	RPG	APG	SPG	BPG	PPG
2010–11	(Greece) Panionios	GBL	16	4.4	.437	.000	.250	0.8	0.0	0.1	0.1	0.9
2011–12	(Greece) Panionios	GBL	21	7.4	**.733**	.000	.550	1.2	0.1	0.3	0.2	3.6
2012–13	(Greece) Aris	GBL	22	13.3	.723	.000	.500	3.2	0.5	0.3	0.5	4.7
2013–14	(Greece) Aris	GBL	17	12.3	.564	.000	.451	3.8	0.1	0.1	0.7	4.9
2014–15	(Greece) AEK	GBL	22	17.3	.666	.000	.511	4.7	0.9	0.3	0.6	6.6
2015–16	(Greece) AEK	GBL	15	8.5	.666	.000	**.933**	2.7	0.3	0.3	0.4	3.1
2016–17	(Greece) Promitheas	GBL	22	13.4	.648	.000	.512	3.2	0.3	0.2	0.3	5.1
2017–18	(Greece) Panionios	GBL	26	20.5	.701	.000	.542	4.6	0.7	0.4	0.5	9.4
2018–19	(Belarus) Tsmoki-Minsk	VTB	26	24.4	.614	.000	.642	6.7	1.2	**0.8**	0.9	10.1
2019–20	(Greece) PAOK	GBL	20	16.5	.535	.000	.742	5.3	0.9	0.3	0.4	5.8
2020–21	(Greece) Iraklis	GBL	2	7.5	.333	.000	.000	1.0	0.5	0.0	0.0	1.0
2021–22	(Qatar) Al Sadd	QBL	**29**	**35.7**	.673	**.667**	.593	**14.5**	**2.2**	0.7	**1.1**	**17.7**

==== Playoffs ====
Year	Team	League	GP	MPG	FG%	3P%	FT%	RPG	APG	SPG	BPG	PPG
2011–12	(Greece) Panionios	GBL	**9**	13.4	.735	.000	.312	3.0	**0.5**	**1.0**	**1.0**	**6.1**
2012–13	(Greece) Aris	GBL	3	7.3	**1.000**	.000	.666	1.3	0.0	0.3	0.0	2.0
2013–14	(Greece) Aris	GBL	2	12.4	.333	.000	**.833**	3.5	0.0	0.0	0.0	3.5
2014–15	(Greece) AEK	GBL	3	**14.0**	.600	.000	.400	**6.0**	0.3	0.6	0.0	4.6
2015–16	(Greece) AEK	GBL	6	5.3	.500	.000	.000	1.7	0.2	0.2	0.0	0.3
