= Leonidas Kaselakis =

Greek basketball player (born 1990)

Leonidas Kaselakis Λεωνίδας Κασελάκης
No. 14 – Maroussi
- Position: Power forward / small forward
- League: GBL

Personal information
- Born: 1 June 1990 (age 36) Cholargos, Greece
- Listed height: 6 ft 8 in (2.03 m)
- Listed weight: 250 lb (113 kg)

Career information
- NBA draft: 2012: undrafted
- Playing career: 2008–present

Career history
- 2008–2012: Ilysiakos
- 2012–2014: PAOK Thessaloniki
- 2014–2015: AEK Athens
- 2015–2016: Nea Kifissia
- 2016–2018: Astana
- 2018–2020: Promitheas Patras
- 2020–2022: Panathinaikos
- 2022–2024: Peristeri
- 2024–2026: Karditsa
- 2026–present: Maroussi

Career highlights
- Greek League champion (2021); Greek Cup winner (2021); Greek Super Cup winner (2021); Greek League Most Improved Player (2016); Greek League All-Star (2023); 2× Kazakh champion (2017, 2018); 2× Kazak Cup winner (2017, 2018)
Medals
Men's basketball
Representing Greece
FIBA Under-19 World Cup
Silver medal – second place	2009 New Zealand	U-19 Team
AST Under-18 World Championship
Gold medal – first place	2008 Germany	U-18 Team
FIBA Europe Under-20 Championship
Gold medal – first place	2009 Greece	U-20 Team
Silver medal – second place	2010 Croatia	U-20 Team
FIBA Europe Under-18 Championship
Gold medal – first place	2008 Greece	U-18 Team

Leonidas Kaselakis (Greek: Λεωνίδας Κασελάκης; born 1 June 1990) is a Greek professional basketball player for Karditsa of the Greek Basketball League. He is a 2.03 m (6 ft 8 in) tall, 113 kg (250 lbs.) power forward, who can also play at the small forward position.

== Professional career ==
=== Ilysiakos (2008–2012) ===
Kaselakis began his professional career in the Greek 2nd division with Ilysiakos.

=== PAOK (2012–2014) ===
Kaselakis signed a two-year contract with the Greek Basket League club PAOK in 2012.

=== AEK (2014–2015) ===
In 2014, Kaselakis moved to AEK.

=== Nea Kifissia (2015–2016) ===
Kaselakis was named the Greek League Most Improved Player, in 2016, while he was a player of the Greek club Nea Kifissia.

=== Astana (2016–2018) ===
On 17 July 2016, Kaselakis signed with the Kazakh VTB United League team Astana, where he spent two successful seasons.

=== Promitheas Patras (2018–2020) ===
On 27 June 2018, Kaselakis returned to Greece, and signed a two-year contract with Promitheas Patras.

=== Panathinaikos (2020–2022) ===
On 7 August 2020, Kaselakis signed a one-year contract with Greek Basket League champions and EuroLeague mainstays Panathinaikos Athens. In the Greek Basket League, he averaged 4.1 points and 2.3 rebounds, while playing around 13 minutes per contest. Additionally, in 28 EuroLeague matches, he averaged 2.2 points and 1.5 rebounds, while playing around 10 minutes per contest.

On 26 July 2021, Kaselakis agreed to extend his contract with the Greens for another season. In 32 domestic Greek league games, he averaged 5.6 points, 3.2 rebounds and 1.3 assists, while playing around 18 minutes per contest. Additionally, in 31 EuroLeague games, he averaged 3.7 points and 2 rebounds, while playing around 15 minutes per contest.

=== Peristeri (2022–2024) ===
On 28 June 2022, Kaselakis signed a two-year contract with Peristeri of the Greek Basket League and the Basketball Champions League. In 29 domestic Greek league games, he averaged 8.8 points, 4 rebounds and 1.4 assists in 25 minutes per contest.

=== Karditsa (2024–2026) ===
On 11 August 2024, Kaselakis signed a two-year deal with Karditsa.

=== Maroussi (2026–present) ===
On July 17, 2026, he signed with Maroussi of the Greek Basketball League (GBL).

== National team career ==
=== Greek junior national team ===
As a member of the junior national basketball teams of Greece, Kaselakis won the gold medal at the 2008 AST Under-18 World Championship, the gold medal at the 2008 FIBA Europe Under-18 Championship and the silver medal at the 2009 FIBA Under-19 World Cup. He also won the gold medal at the 2009 FIBA Europe Under-20 Championship and the silver medal at the 2010 FIBA Europe Under-20 Championship with Greece's junior national team.

=== Greek senior national team ===
Kaselakis first became a member of the senior men's Greek national team in 2018. He played with Greece at the 2019 FIBA World Cup qualifiers. He also played with Greece at the 2022 FIBA EuroBasket Qualifiers, the 2021 FIBA Victoria Olympic Qualifying Tournament, and the 2023 FIBA World Cup Qualifiers.

== Awards and accomplishments ==
=== Pro career ===
- Greek League Most Improved Player: (2016)

=== Greek junior national team ===
- 2008 AST Under-18 World Championship: Gold
- 2008 FIBA Europe Under-18 Championship: Gold
- 2009 FIBA Under-19 World Cup: Silver
- 2009 FIBA Europe Under-20 Championship: Gold
- 2010 FIBA Europe Under-20 Championship: Silver
