= Tautvydas Šležas =

Lithuanian basketball coach (born 1990)

Lietkabelis Panevėžys
- Position: Assistant coach
- League: LKL; EuroCup

Personal information
- Born: 31 March 1990 (age 36) Kaunas, Lithuania
- Listed height: 6 ft 10 in (2.08 m)
- Listed weight: 260 lb (118 kg)

Career information
- Playing career: 2006–2019
- Coaching career: 2022–present

Career history

Playing
- 2006–2008: BC Tauragė
- 2008–2011: Lietuvos rytas Vilnius
- 2009–2011: BC Perlas
- 2011–2012: Juventus Utena
- 2012–2013: BC Prienai
- 2013–2014: BC Dzūkija
- 2014–2015: Fürstenfeld Panthers
- 2015–2016: Cáceres Patrimonio de la Humanidad
- 2016: Dominion Bilbao Basket
- 2016–2017: RETAbet.es GBC
- 2017–2018: Iberostar Palma
- 2018–2019: University of Tartu

Coaching
- 2022–2026: BC Žalgiris-2 (assistant)
- 2026–present: BC Lietkabelis (assistant)

Career highlights
- As player: FIBA U18 European Championship (2008) – Silver; LKF Cup (2009) – Champion; Baltic Basketball League (2010) – Bronze; Lithuanian Students Basketball League (2013 & 2014) – Champion; Liga Española de Baloncesto (2017) – Champion; As coach: National Basketball League (Lithuania) (2023) – Champion; National Basketball League (Lithuania) (2025) – Bronze; Euroleague Basketball Next Generation Tournament (2025) – Champion

Tautvydas Šležas (born 31 March 1990) is a Lithuanian professional basketball coach and former player. He is currently an assistant coach for Lietkabelis Panevėžys of the Lithuanian Basketball League (LKL) and the EuroCup.

== Career ==
=== Player ===
Born in Kaunas, Lithuania, Šležas started his professional career 2006 with Bremena-KTU Tauragė of the National Basketball League.

Two years later, he signed with Lietuvos rytas Vilnius, but he rarely stepped on court for the team, and was loaned to its junior team Perlas Vilnius.

On 11 September 2011, signed a one-year contract with Juventus Utena. On 7 October 2011, playing in his second game of the season, Šležas suffered an ankle injury, which kept him out of the lineup for four months. After playing with Prienai and Dzūkija Alytus, Šležas left Lithuania in 2014, signing with the Fürstenfeld Panthers of the Österreichische Basketball Bundesliga (ÖBL). In 2015 he signed with Cáceres Patrimonio de la Humanidad of LEB Oro. On 25 January 2016, he became the MVP of the round 19 after scoring 21 points and grabbing 18 rebounds in an 81–78 win over Cocinas.com.

Two weeks later, Šležas signed a contract until the end of the 2015–16 season with Dominion Bilbao Basket of Liga ACB. In summer of 2016, he signed a one-year contract with RETAbet.es GBC of LEB Oro.

=== National team ===
Šležas played for the Lithuanian under-16 national team in the 2006 FIBA Europe Under-16 Championship. In 2008, he played for the Lithuanian under-18 national team in the 2008 FIBA Europe Under-18 Championship where they won silver medals, and was part of the team in the 2009 FIBA Under-19 World Championship. In 2010, he played for the Lithuanian under-20 national team in the 2010 FIBA Europe Under-20 Championship.

=== Coach ===
During summers Tautvydas works with individual players, including Edgaras Ulanovas, Marius Grigonis, Brock Motum, Malik Monk, Paulius Valinskas, Paulius Murauskas and Martynas Pacevičius.

On 1August 2022 he officially became an assistant coach for BC Žalgiris-2.

On 22 April 2023 he became National Basketball League (Lithuania) Champion with BC Žalgiris-2.

On 16 April 2025 he won National Basketball League (Lithuania) Bronze medal with BC Žalgiris-2.

On 25 May 2025 he became champion of Euroleague Basketball Next Generation Tournament with BC Žalgiris .

On 18 June 2026 joined Nenad Čanak (basketball) coaching staff in BC Lietkabelis of EuroCup Basketball

=== Television ===
After his official retirement in 2019, he became an NBA and ACB live in-game TV analyst for Go3 Sport in Lithuania.

On 25 September 2022 he became the analyst of Lietuvos krepšinio lyga.

From October 2024 until February 2026, he produced and hosted his own original show – "3D Basketball with Tautvydas Šležas".
