= Élite 2 Leaders Cup =

Basketball competition in France

Pro B Leaders Cup
- Founded: 2015; 11 years ago
- First season: 2015
- No. of teams: 18
- Country: France
- Most recent champion: ALM Évreux Basket (1st title) (2022)
- Most titles: Chorale Roanne (2)
- Related competitions: LNB Pro B (French 2nd Division); French Cup (Federation Cup)
- Website: www.lnb.fr

The LNB Pro B Leaders Cup is a professional national basketball cup competition that is played in a given LNB Pro B (French 2nd Division) season. The trophy is the second tier level of its type in France, being one tier blow the LNB Pro A Leaders Cup, in which teams from the LNB Pro A (French 1st Division) compete. The Pro B Leaders Cup was introduced in 2015, in order to give Pro B teams more to play for in a given season.

== Format ==
In the first phase of the competition, all 18 Pro B teams are divided into groups of three teams. After that, teams play in a knock-out system, with double legs in the quarterfinals and semifinals. The final is played at a neutral venue.

== Results ==
=== Finals ===
Year	Winner	Score	Runners-up	Venue	City	MVP
2015	Antibes Sharks	56–54	BC Souffelweyersheim	Disneyland Paris	Chessy	(United States) Tim Blue
2016	JL Bourg	81–69	Boulazac Dordogne	Disneyland Paris	Chessy	(France) Christophe Léonard
2017	Chorale Roanne	88–80	SOMB	Disneyland Paris	Chessy	(United States) Joe Burton
2018	Denain Voltaire	98–87 (ot)	Orléans Loiret	Disneyland Paris	Chessy	(United States) Lance Goulbourne
2019	Chorale Roanne (2)	66–60	Rouen Métropole	Disneyland Paris	Chessy	(United States) David Jackson
2020	Hermine Nantes	73–58	Olympique Antibes	Disneyland Paris	Chessy	(France) Ludovic Négrobar
2021	Fos Provence	68–57	UJAP Quimper	Halle des sports Parsemain	Fos-sur-mer	(United States) Jamar Diggs
2022	ALM Évreux	169–157 (79–79, 90–78)	SLUC Nancy	Salle Jean Fourré	Évreux	(France) Fabien Paschal
2022	ALM Évreux	169–157 (79–79, 90–78)	SLUC Nancy	Palais des sports Jean-Weille	Nancy	(France) Fabien Paschal

=== Titles by team ===
Rank	Team	Winners	Runners-up
1	Chorale Roanne	2	0
2	Olympique Antibes	1	1
3	JL Bourg	1	0
3	Denain Voltaire	1	0
3	Hermine Nantes	1	0
3	Fos Provence	1	0
3	ALM Évreux	1	0
8	BC Souffelweyersheim	0	1
8	Boulazac	0	1
8	SOMB	0	1
8	Orléans	0	1
8	Rouen	0	1
8	SLUC Nancy	0	1
8	UJAP Quimper	0	1
