= Andrew Albicy =

French basketball player (born 1990)

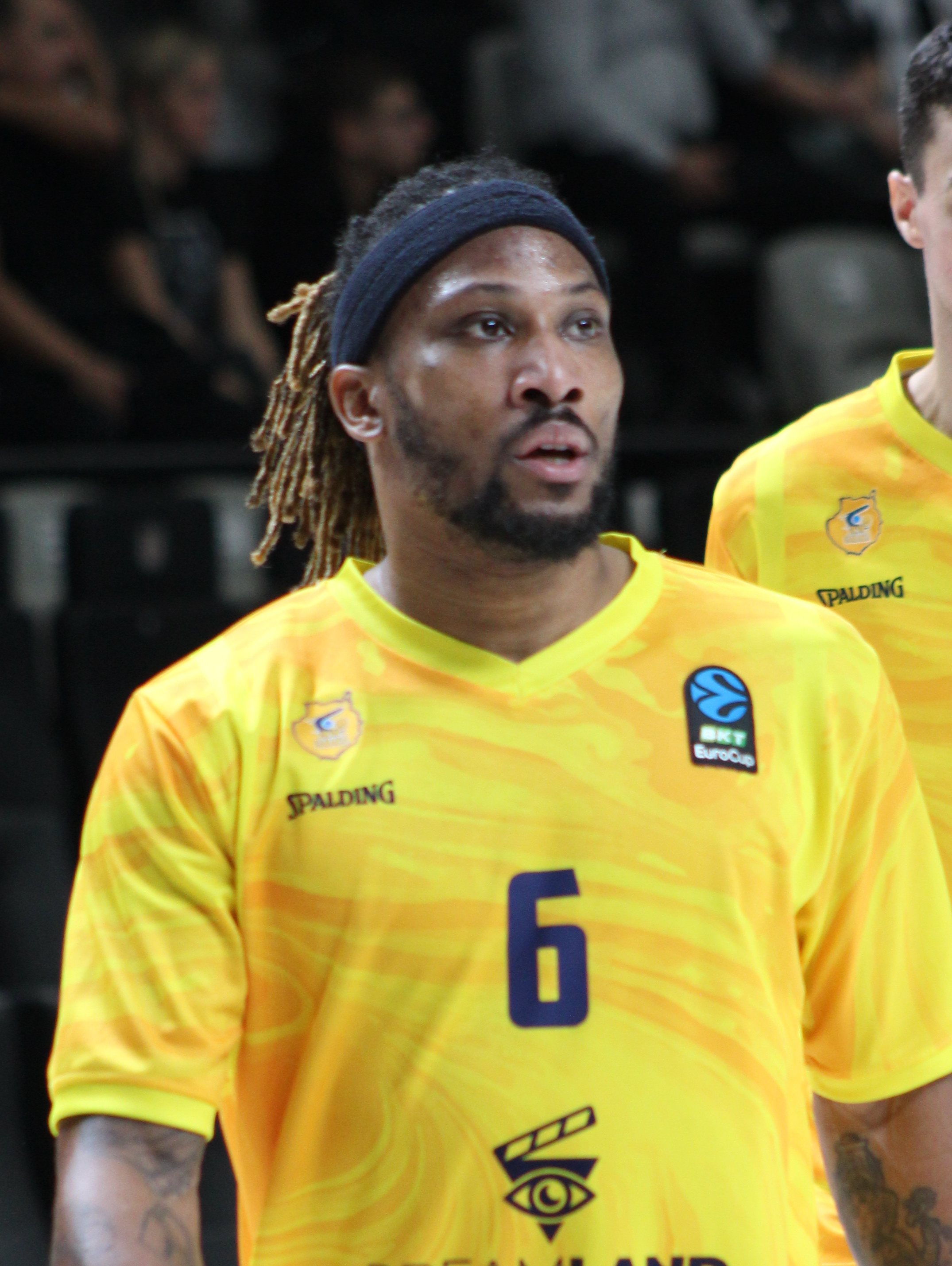
- Albicy with Gran Canaria in 2024

No. 6 – Limoges CSP
- Position: Point guard
- League: LNB Élite

Personal information
- Born: 21 March 1990 (age 36) Sèvres, France
- Listed height: 1.78 m (5 ft 10 in)
- Listed weight: 7 kg (15 lb)

Career information
- NBA draft: 2012: undrafted
- Playing career: 2006–present

Career history
- 2006–2011: Paris-Levallois
- 2011–2012: Gravelines
- 2012–2014: Paris-Levallois
- 2014–2016: Gravelines
- 2016–2019: Andorra
- 2019–2020: Zenit Saint Petersburg
- 2020–2026: Gran Canaria
- 2026–present: Limoges

Career highlights
- EuroCup champion (2023); All-EuroCup First Team (2019); EuroCup steals leader (2022); Pro A All-Star Game MVP (2016); Pro A Best Defender (2012); Pro A Rising Star (2010); FIBA Europe Under-20 Championship MVP (2010)

Andrew Albicy (born 21 March 1990) is a French professional basketball player for Limoges of the French LNB Élite. He also represents the French national team in international competition.

== Club career ==
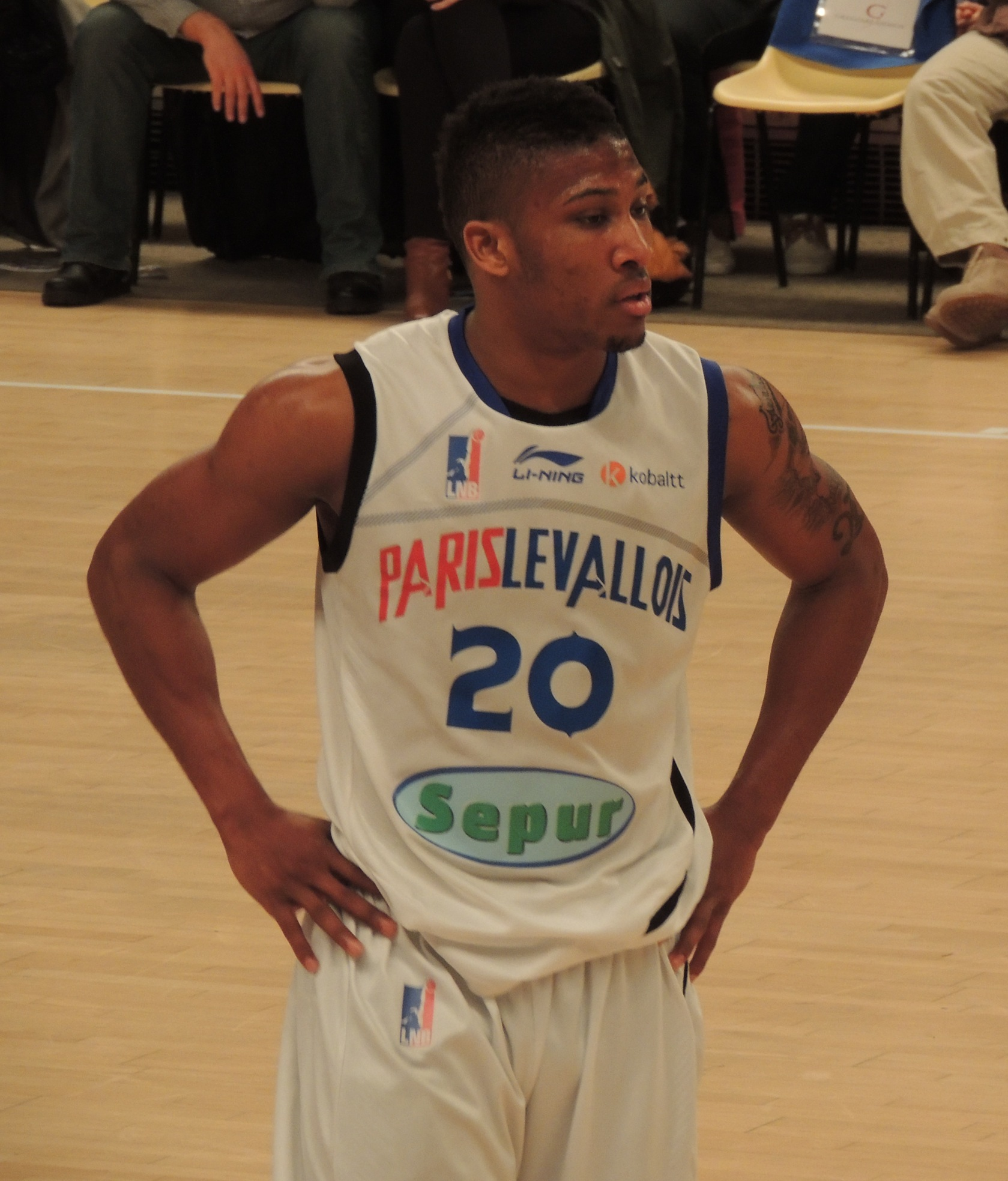
Albicy with Paris-Levallois in December 2012

Albicy has played with the Paris-Levallois Basket's youth team as a junior. He made a few appearances for the club's senior team between 2006 and 2009, before playing his first full season for the team in the 2009–10 season. Albicy averaged 4.5 points and 3.6 assists per game for the team while backing up starting guard Jimmal Ball.

Albicy initially declared as an early-entry candidate for the 2010 NBA draft before withdrawing his name from consideration.

On 31 July 2014 he signed a two-year deal with BCM Gravelines.

After finishing his contract at Gravelines, in June 2016 Albicy signed for MoraBanc Andorra. This will be his first experience out of France. On 24 August 2017 he signed a two-year contract extension with Andorra. In the 2018–19 season, Albicy reached the semi-finals of the EuroCup with Andorra.

On 17 June 2019 Albicy signed a contract with Zenit Saint Petersburg of the VTB United League. He parted ways with the team on 20 July 2020. Albicy averaged 6.6 points and 4.4 assists per game. On 25 July 2020 he signed with Herbalife Gran Canaria of the Spanish Liga ACB.

On 23 June 2026, he signed with Limoges of the French LNB Élite.

== International career ==
Albicy played with the French national basketball team at each level of junior basketball. He appeared for the team at the 2006 FIBA Europe Under-16 Championship, U18 European Championship Men 2008 Division A, FIBA Under-19 World Championship 2009, and 2010 FIBA Europe Under-20 Championship. He was named tournament MVP for the gold-medal winning French team at the 2010 Under-20 tournament.

He was called to the senior French team for the first time at the 2010 FIBA World Championship to replace fellow point guard Rodrigue Beaubois. At only twenty years of age, he was the youngest member of the French team at the tournament.

== Personal life ==
Albicy's mother is from the French overseas department of Martinique.

Albicy is married to a Finnish woman with whom he has children.
