= Vangelis Mantzaris =

Greek basketball player (born 1990)

Vangelis Mantzaris Βαγγέλης Μάντζαρης
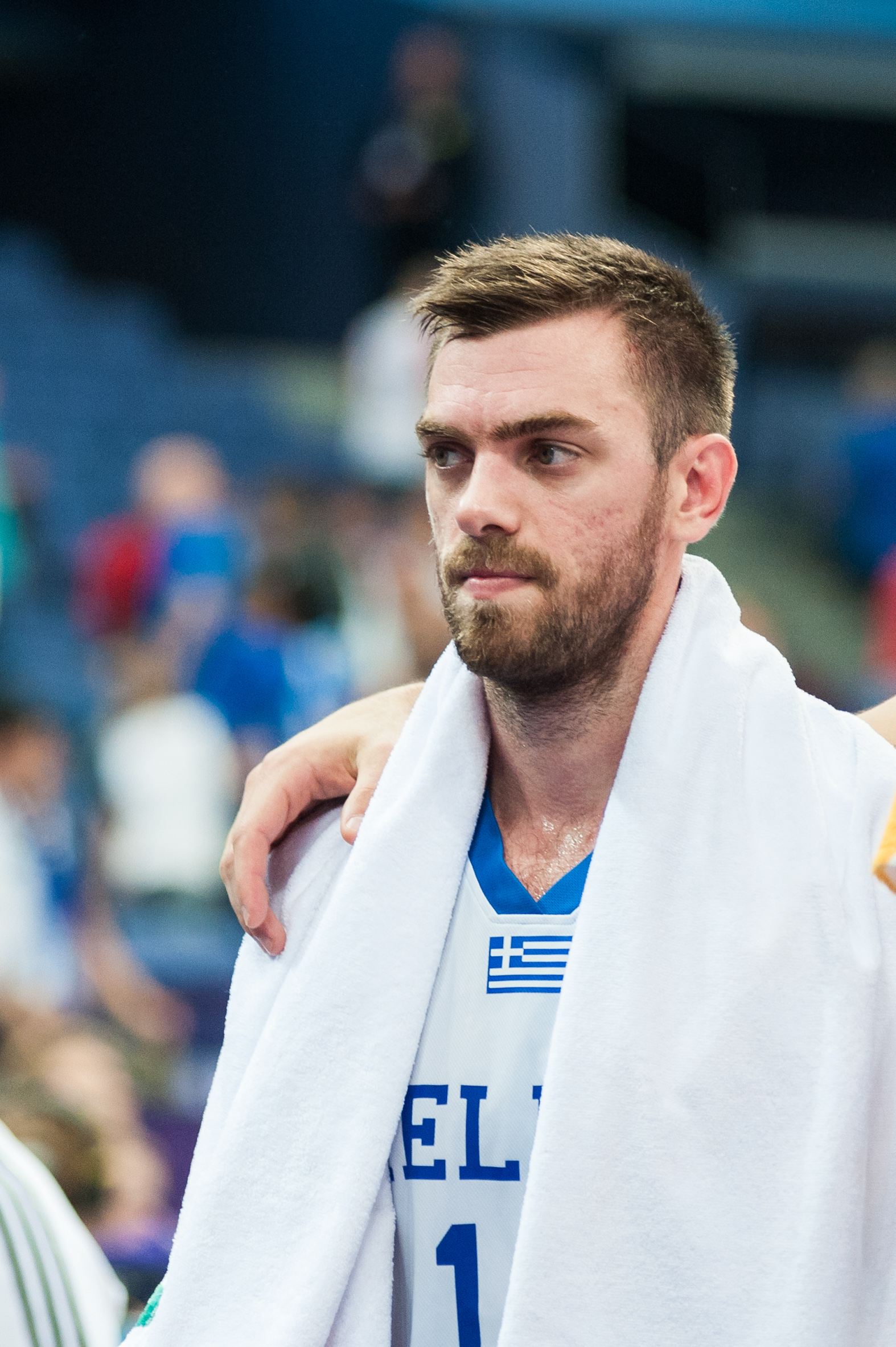
- Mantzaris during EuroBasket 2017

No. 17 – Mykonos
- Position: Point guard
- League: Greek Basketball League

Personal information
- Born: April 16, 1990 (age 36) Peristeri, Athens, Greece
- Listed height: 6 ft 5 in (1.96 m)
- Listed weight: 210 lb (95 kg)

Career information
- NBA draft: 2012: undrafted
- Playing career: 2007–present

Career history
- 2007–2011: Peristeri
- 2011–2019: Olympiacos
- 2019–2020: UNICS Kazan
- 2020: Promitheas Patras
- 2020–2021: Peristeri
- 2021: Stal Ostrów Wielkopolski
- 2021: Hapoel Eilat
- 2021–2022: PAOK Thessaloniki
- 2022–2023: Ionikos Nikaias
- 2023: Panteras de Miranda
- 2023–2024: Pallacanestro Roseto
- 2024–present: Mykonos

Career highlights
- FIBA Intercontinental Cup champion (2013); 2× EuroLeague champion (2012, 2013); 3× Greek League champion (2012, 2015, 2016); 2× Greek All-Star (2014, 2020); 2x Greek A2 Elite League champion (2009, 2025)
Medals
Men's basketball
Representing Greece
FIBA Under-19 World Cup
Silver medal – second place	2009 New Zealand	Under-19
FIBA Europe Under-20 Championship
Gold medal – first place	2009 Greece	Under-20
Silver medal – second place	2010 Croatia	Under-20
FIBA Europe Under-18 Championship
Gold medal – first place	2008 Greece	under-18

Evangelos "Vangelis" Mantzaris (Greek: Ευάγγελος "Βαγγέλης" Μάντζαρης; born April 16, 1990) is a Greek professional basketball player and the team captain for Mykonos of the Greek Basketball League. He is a 1.96 m (6 ft 5 in) tall point guard. He has also represented the senior Greek national team in international competition.

== Professional career ==
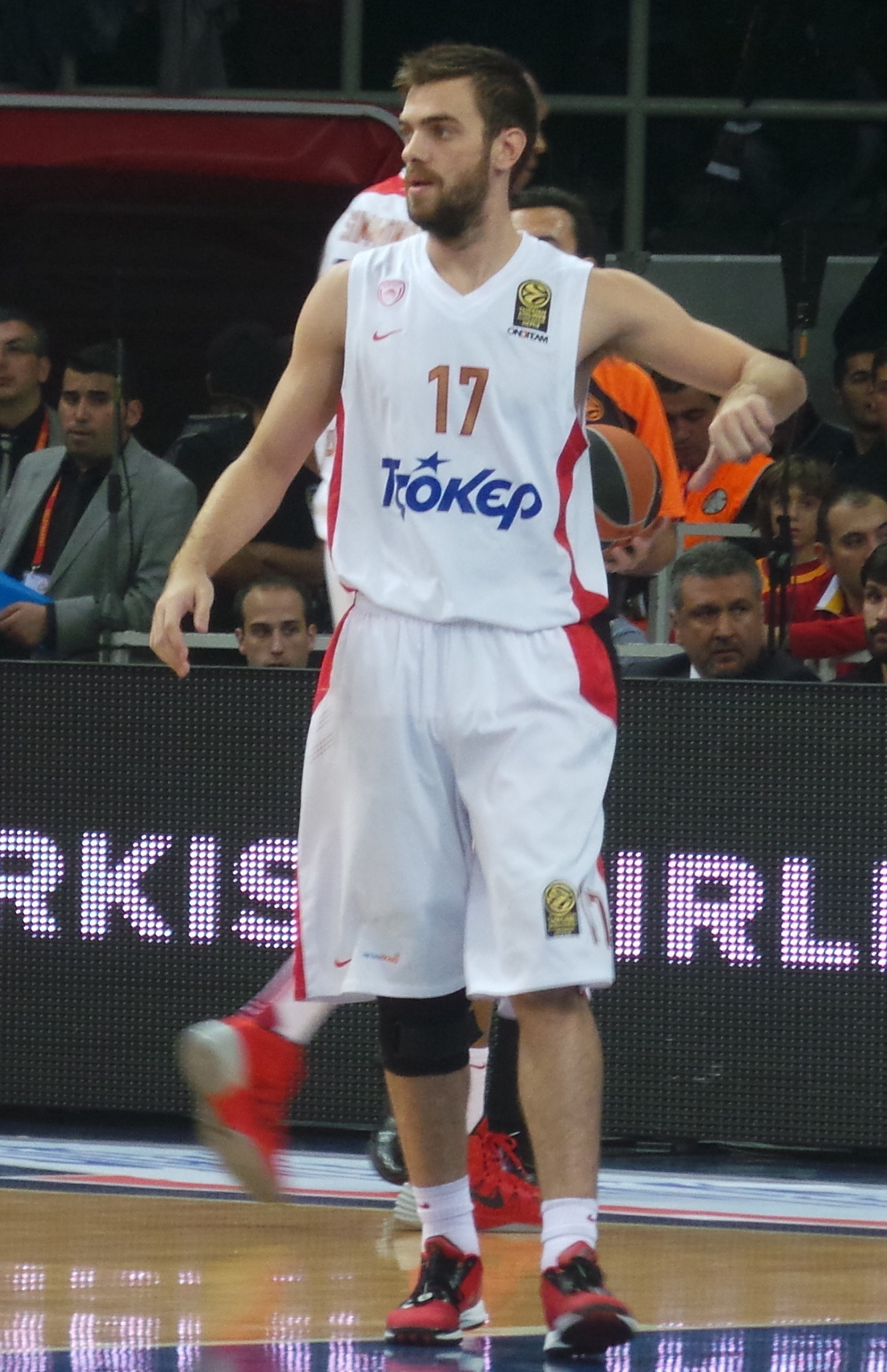
Mantzaris during an Olympiacos game in the EuroLeague in 2013

=== Peristeri ===
Mantzaris began his professional career in the Greek 2nd Division with Peristeri, the team of his hometown. With Peristeri, he won the Greek 2nd Division championship in 2009.

=== Olympiacos ===
On September 5, 2011, Mantzaris signed a four-year deal with the top-tier level Greek Basket League and EuroLeague club Olympiacos Piraeus. He won both the EuroLeague and Greek League championships in 2012, being a useful tool for the team of coach Dušan Ivković, especially due to his defensive ability.

In January 2013, Mantzaris suffered a season-ending knee injury, after rupturing the anterior cruciate ligament in his right knee during a Greek Basket League derby against PAOK Thessaloniki at PAOK Sports Arena. Despite suffering the knee injury, he remained close to his teammates both in and out of the locker room in order to support them, as they won the EuroLeague 2012–13 season championship. Mantzaris returned to action seven months later and in early October of the same year won the FIBA Intercontinental Cup against Pinheiros at Ginásio José Corrêa, Brazil. In the two finals, he averaged 9 points, 4.5 rebounds and 3 assists, helping Olympiacos to celebrate the title. On 29 July 2014, Mantzaris extended his contract with Olympiacos through 2017.

Mantzaris won the Greek League 2014–15 season and Greek League 2015–16 season national domestic championships with Olympiacos, under the instructions of former Houston Rockets assistant coach, Ioannis Sfairopoulos, being the starting point guard of his team in both seasons. He also competed in the 2015 EuroLeague Finals versus Real Madrid, in Madrid, and in the 2017 EuroLeague Finals against Fenerbahçe, in Istanbul, however without earning the trophy.

On June 16, 2017, Mantzaris signed a three-year contract extension with Olympiacos.

=== UNICS Kazan ===
On July 20, 2019, Mantzaris was released from Olympiacos, after eight seasons, and signed with UNICS Kazan of the VTB United League and the EuroCup, playing under fellow Greek coach Dimitrios Priftis. He left in December, returning to Greece.

=== Promitheas Patras ===
On December 30, 2019, Mantzaris returned to Greece and signed with EuroCup side Promitheas Patras. He averaged 10.5 points, 2.2 rebounds, 5.3 assists and 1.8 steals per game. On October 8, 2020, Mantzaris re-signed with the team.

=== Return to Peristeri ===
On December 17, 2020, Mantzaris officially returned to Peristeri after nine years.

=== Stal Ostrów Wielkopolski ===
On August 6, 2021, he has signed with Stal Ostrów Wielkopolski of the Polish Basketball League. In four games he averaged five points, five assists, 3.3 rebounds, and 1.3 steals per game.

=== Hapoel Eilat ===
On October 4, 2021, Mantzaris signed with Hapoel Eilat of the Israeli Basketball Premier League.

=== PAOK ===
On November 11, 2021, Mantzaris signed with PAOK of the Greek Basket League.

After the season ended, Mantzaris stated that the cooperation with coach Aris Lykogiannis was not good, something that confirmed the poor communication between them.

=== Ionikos Nikaias ===
On September 22, 2022, Mantzaris moved to Ionikos Nikaias.

=== Venezuela ===
On March 24, 2023, Mantzaris signed with Venezuelan club Panteras de Miranda for the rest of the season.

=== Pallacanestro Roseto ===
On September 4, 2023, Mantzaris signed with Pallacanestro Roseto of the Italian third division.

=== Mykonos ===
Mantzaris returned to Greece signing with Mykonos for the 2024–2025 campaign and ultimately helped the club achieve promotion to the 1st division.

== National team career ==
=== Greek junior national team ===
As a member of the junior national basketball teams of Greece, Mantzaris won the gold medal at the 2008 FIBA Europe Under-18 Championship and the silver medal at the 2009 FIBA Under-19 World Cup. Mantzaris also won the gold medal at the 2009 FIBA Europe Under-20 Championship, and the silver medal at the 2010 FIBA Europe Under-20 Championship, with Greece's junior national teams.

=== Greek senior national team ===
Mantzaris became a member of the senior men's Greek national basketball team in 2011. He was a member of Greece's senior national teams that played at the 2012 FIBA World Olympic Qualifying Tournament, the 2014 FIBA World Cup, and the EuroBasket 2015. He also played at the 2016 Turin FIBA World Olympic Qualifying Tournament, and at the EuroBasket 2017.

He also represented Greece at the 2019 FIBA World Cup qualification.

== Career statistics ==
Legend
GP	Games played	GS	Games started	MPG	Minutes per game
FG%	Field-goal percentage	3P%	3-point field-goal percentage	FT%	Free-throw percentage
RPG	Rebounds per game	APG	Assists per game	SPG	Steals per game
BPG	Blocks per game	PPG	Points per game	PIR	Performance index rating
**Bold**	Career high

=== EuroLeague ===
†	Denotes season in which Mantzaris won the EuroLeague
*	Led the league

Year	Team	GP	GS	MPG	FG%	3P%	FT%	RPG	APG	SPG	BPG	PPG	PIR
2011–12†	Olympiacos	18	14	14.1	.212	.364	.385	2.3	.9	.6	—	1.9	2.8
2012–13†	Olympiacos	15	15	20.9	.419	.438	.750	2.5	2.3	**.9**	**.1**	3.5	4.9
2013–14	Olympiacos	29	25	23.6	.387	.364	.607	**3.4**	**3.2**	.7	—	4.5	**6.9**
2014–15	Olympiacos	29	29	22.4	**.433**	.365	.609	2.2	2.5	.6	.0	5.1	5.6
2015–16	Olympiacos	24	24	22.9	.405	**.447**	.719	2.8	2.0	.7	.0	**6.5**	6.5
2016–17	Olympiacos	**37***	**37***	**23.7**	.348	.364	.696	2.8	2.4	.7	—	5.8	4.9
2017–18	Olympiacos	31	12	19.6	.322	.275	**.829**	2.1	2.0	.7	.0	4.4	4.1
2018–19	Olympiacos	27	3	11.9	.271	.211	.500	1.6	1.2	.3	.0	1.4	1.6
Career		183	156	21.5	.376	.365	.683	2.6	2.3	.7	.0	4.8	5.2

== Awards and accomplishments ==
=== Pro career ===
Peristeri

- Greek 2nd Division Champion: (2009)

Olympiacos

- 2× EuroLeague Champion: (2012, 2013)
- 2× EuroLeague Final Four: (2015, 2017)
- 3× Greek League Champion: (2012, 2015, 2016)
- FIBA Intercontinental Cup Champion: (2013)

=== Greek junior national team ===
- 2008 Albert Schweitzer Tournament: Gold
- 2008 FIBA Europe Under-18 Championship: Gold
- 2009 FIBA Under-19 World Cup: Silver
- 2009 FIBA Europe Under-20 Championship: Gold
- 2010 FIBA Europe Under-20 Championship: Silver

=== Individual ===
- 2× Greek League All-Star: (2014, 2020)
- 2× All-Greek League Defensive Team (2012, 2017)
- 4× Eurobasket.com's All-Greek League Defensive Team: (2014–2017)

== Personal life ==
Mantzaris is a resident of Peristeri, which is a west suburb of Athens, and the biggest municipality of the Attica Region. His brother, Antonis Mantzaris, is also a professional basketball player. They were teammates from 2007, until the summer of 2011, with Peristeri Basketball Club. In 2009, they won the Greek 2nd Division championship with the club. He owns a café in the area, as well.
