= Kazakhstan men's national under-19 basketball team =

Kazakhstan
- FIBA zone: FIBA Asia
- National federation: Kazakhstan Basketball Federation

U19 World Cup
- Appearances: 1 (2009)
- Medals: None

U18 Asia Cup
- Appearances: 13
- Medals: Silver: 1 (2008)

The Kazakhstan men's national under-18 and under-19 basketball team is a national basketball team of Kazakhstan, administered by the Kazakhstan Basketball Federation. It represents the country in international under-18 and under-19 men's basketball competitions.

== FIBA U18 Asia Cup participations ==
Year	Result
1995	10th
1996	12th
1998	6th
2004	8th
2006	5th
2008	2nd place, silver medalist(s)
2010	11th

Year	Result
2012	15th
2014	8th
2016	10th
2018	13th
2024	14th
2026	14th

== FIBA Under-19 Basketball World Cup participations ==
Year	Result
2009	12th

== See also ==
- Kazakhstan men's national basketball team
- Kazakhstan men's national under-16 basketball team
- Kazakhstan women's national under-18 basketball team
