= Toni Prostran =

Croatian ex-basketball player

Career End
- Position: Point guard

Personal information
- Born: April 9, 1991 (age 35) Zadar, SR Croatia, SFR Yugoslavia
- Listed height: 6 ft 0 in (1.83 m)
- Listed weight: 179 lb (81 kg)

Career information
- NBA draft: 2011: undrafted
- Playing career: 2007–2023

Career history

Playing
- 2007–2010: Zadar
- 2010–2012: Zagreb
- 2012–2014: Zadar
- 2014–2015: Norrköping Dolphins
- 2015–2016: LF Norrbotten / BC Luleå
- 2016–2017: Nevėžis Kėdainiai
- 2017: Kolossos Rodou
- 2018: Jämtland Basket
- 2018–2019: Porto
- 2019–2020: Saint-Vallier Basket Drôme
- 2020–2023: Iserlohn Kangaroos

Coaching
- 2023–2024: Iserlohn Kangaroos (assistant)
- 2024–present: Iserlohn Kangaroos

Career highlights
- 2× Croatian League champion (2008, 2011); Croatian Cup winner (2011); 2× All-Swedish league first team (2015, 2016); Lithuanian League assists leader (2017); Baltic League assists leader (2017)
Medals
Men's basketball
Representing Croatia
World U-19 Cup
Bronze medal – third place	2009 New Zealand	U-19 Team
European U-18 Championship
Bronze medal – third place	2008 Greece	U-18 Team

Toni Prostran (born April 9, 1991) is a Croatian professional basketball coach and retired player. Standing at 1.83 m, he played at the point guard position.

== Professional career ==
After passing through the KK Zadar youth squads, Prostran made his debut for the senior team in December 2007. Not satisfied with the opportunities he got at Zadar, he moved to KK Zagreb, in January 2010. Expecting to move his career to another level, Prostran was disappointed at his new club, and he choose to break up his contract, and move back to KK Zadar, in the summer of 2012. After a more successful 2012–13 season (3.7 points, 1.9 rebounds, and 2.3 assists per game in the Adriatic league), in the summer of 2013, he renewed his contract with KK Zadar.

In June 2014, Prostran agreed to a one-year deal with the Swedish league finalists Norrköping Dolphins. He averaged 16.5 points, 2.9 rebounds, and 6.5 assists per game, and he was selected to the eurobasket.com website's All Swedish league first team, and was also named the league's best Bosman player of the year by eurobasket.com. In the summer of 2015, he moved to another Swedish club, LF Basket Norrbotten. He averaged 15.8 points, 3.2 rebounds, and 7.7 assists per game (the most assists per game in the league), and he was once again named by the website eurobasket.com, to the All Swedish League first team, and as the league's best Bosman player of the year.

In October 2020, Prostran moved to Iserlohn Kangaroos playing in the third-tier German Pro-B league. He also took the position of the club's U16 team coach. Prostran retired in February 2023 and was named assistant coach for the Iserlohn team. On February 1st, 2024, he was promoted to the head coach position.

== National team career ==
Prostran played with the Croatian junior national teams. His very successful youth career started at the 2007 European U-16 Championship, where he took the title of top scorer, and was chosen to the All-tournament team. In 2008, he was a part of the Croatian team that won the bronze medal at the European U-18 Championship. His second bronze medal came a year later, at the 2009 World U-19 Cup. Prostran was selected to the All-Tournament Team, as he also was a few weeks later at the 2009 European U-18 Championship, where he took the top scorer and assists titles as well.
