= Cody Ellis =

Australian basketball player (born 1990)

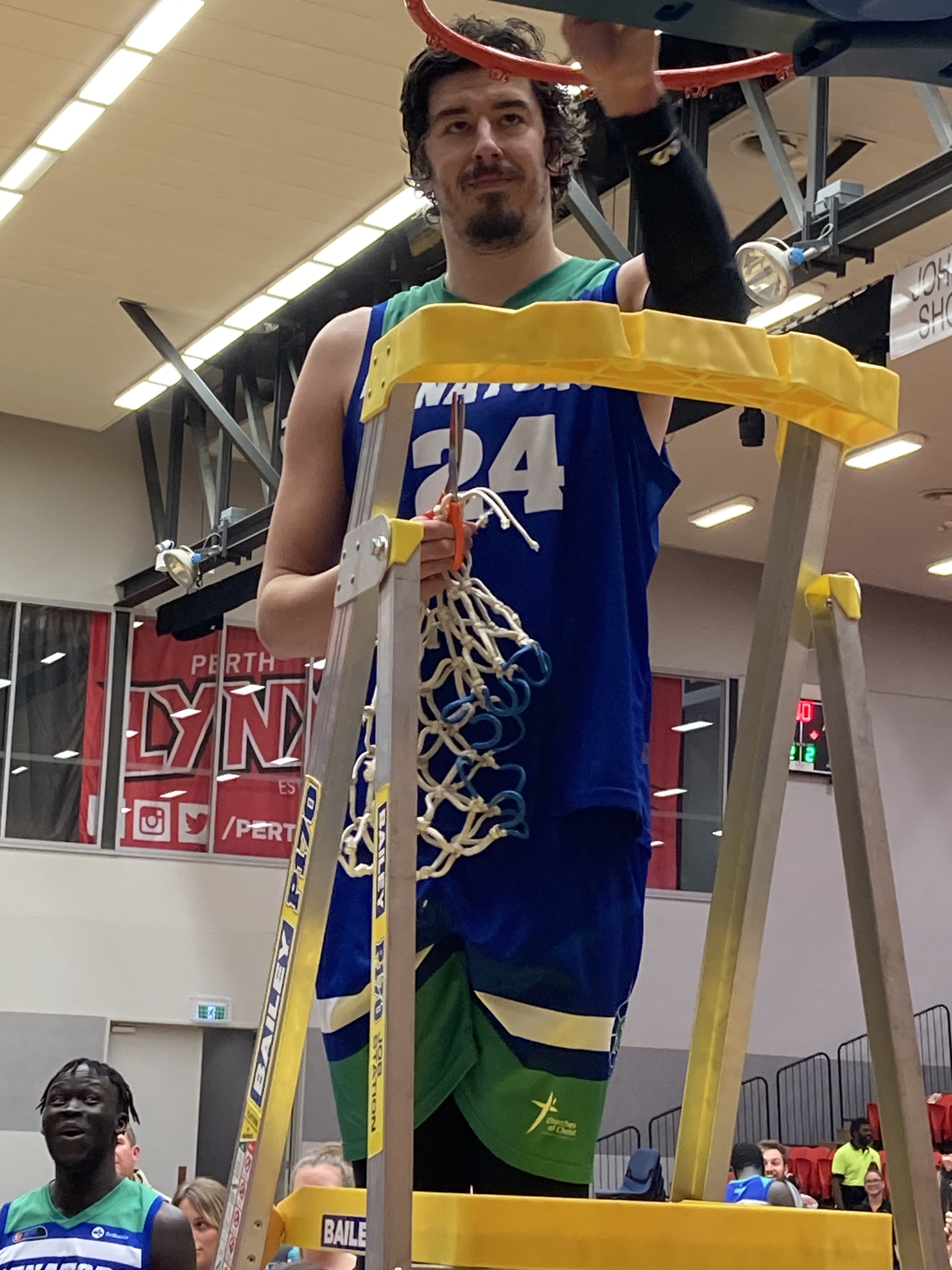
- Ellis with the Warwick Senators in 2020

No. 25 – Warwick Senators
- Position: Power forward
- League: NBL1 West

Personal information
- Born: 24 April 1990 (age 36) Perth, Western Australia, Australia
- Listed height: 202 cm (6 ft 8 in)
- Listed weight: 110 kg (243 lb)

Career information
- High school: Lake Ginninderra (Canberra, ACT)
- College: Saint Louis (2009–2013)
- NBA draft: 2013: undrafted
- Playing career: 2008–present

Career history
- 2008–2009: Australian Institute of Sport
- 2013–2015: Sydney Kings
- 2014–present: Stirling/Warwick Senators
- 2015–2018: Illawarra Hawks

Career highlights
- WCC champion (2020); Atlantic 10 Sixth Man of the Year (2013); Atlantic 10 All-Rookie Team (2010)
Medals
Men's basketball
Representing Australia
Summer Universiade
Silver medal – second place	2013 Kazan	Team competition

Cody Gordon Ellis (born 24 April 1990) is an Australian basketball player for the Warwick Senators of the NBL1 West. After four years of college basketball for the Saint Louis Billikens, Ellis had a five-year stint in the National Basketball League (NBL) between 2013 and 2018 with the Sydney Kings and Illawarra Hawks.

== Early life and career ==
Ellis was born and raised in Perth, Western Australia. In 2008 and 2009, he attended the Australian Institute of Sport (AIS) in Canberra, where he played for the AIS men's team in the South East Australian Basketball League (SEABL). While in Canberra, he attended Lake Ginninderra Secondary College.

== College career ==
Ellis moved to the United States for the 2009–10 college season to play for the Saint Louis Billikens. He missed the first 14 games of the season before being cleared by the NCAA and joined the team in January 2010. He played in 22 games with 19 starts and averaged 10.5 points and 4.9 rebounds per game. He subsequently earned Atlantic 10 All-Rookie Team honours.

As a sophomore in 2010–11, Ellis played in 21 games for the Billikens before suffering a season-ending dislocated shoulder in February 2011. For the season, he averaged 6.5 points and 3.7 rebounds per game.

As a junior in 2011–12, Ellis managed his first full season while serving as a key sixth man for the Billikens, appearing in every game (34) and coming off the bench in all but one. He averaged 10.1 points per game and led the team with 69 three-pointers made, which tied for the eighth most in a single season at SLU.

As a senior in 2012–13, Ellis earned Atlantic 10 Sixth Man of the Year honours. He appeared in all 35 games off the bench, averaging 10.1 points and 3.5 rebounds per game. He led the team with 62 three-point field goals and was seventh in the A-10 with a .829 free-throw percentage.

Ellis ended his career at SLU as one of 27 1,000-point scorers (1,062) in school history, and ranked sixth all-time at SLU in three-pointers made (194) and fourth in attempts (580).

== Professional career ==
=== NBL ===
==== Sydney Kings (2013–2015) ====
On 13 July 2013, Ellis signed a two-year deal with the Sydney Kings of the National Basketball League. However, his arrival in Sydney was delayed until December 2013 while he completed his studies in business at Saint Louis. He made his debut for the Kings on 3 January 2014 against the Cairns Taipans, and in 16 games during the 2013–14 NBL season, Ellis averaged 5.1 points and 3.1 rebounds per game.

On 25 March 2014, the Kings took up the second-year option on Ellis two-year contract, re-signing him for the 2014–15 season. He scored a career-high 18 points on 17 January 2015 in an 80–76 loss to the Cairns Taipans. He appeared in all 28 games for the Kings in 2014–15, averaging 6.9 points and 3.4 rebounds per game.

==== Illawarra Hawks (2015–2018) ====
On 10 August 2015, Ellis signed with the Illawarra Hawks for the 2015–16 NBL season. On 17 January 2016, he scored 18 points in the Hawks' 103–96 double-overtime win over the New Zealand Breakers. In 29 games for the Hawks in 2015–16, Ellis averaged 6.0 points, 2.6 rebounds and 1.1 assists per game.

On 20 April 2016, Ellis re-signed with the Hawks on a two-year deal. He helped the Hawks reach the 2017 NBL Grand Final, where they faced the Perth Wildcats. In game one of the series, Ellis scored a team- and season-high 12 points in an 89–77 loss. The Hawks went on to lose the best-of-five series in three games. Ellis appeared in all 34 games for the Hawks in 2016–17, averaging 4.6 points, 1.5 rebounds and 1.1 assists per game.

Ellis entered the 2017–18 NBL season eight kilos lighter. However, a bout of chicken pox kept him out of the NBL pre-season blitz. Ellis started the 2017–18 season out of the rotation after management at the Hawks sent down the edict to the coaching staff that he wasn't to play. Eventually he hit the floor and finished the season strongly. In 20 games for the Hawks in 2017–18, he averaged 6.7 points, 1.4 rebounds and 1.0 assists per game.

In September 2018, Ellis joined the Cairns Taipans as a pre-season injury replacement for Lucas Walker.

=== SBL / NBL1 West ===
==== Stirling/Warwick Senators (2014–present) ====
Every year between 2014 and 2026, Ellis has played for the Warwick Senators in the State Basketball League (SBL) / NBL1 West. Known as the Stirling Senators when he first joined the club, Ellis played in the SBL during the NBL off-seasons before continuing in the league following his NBL tenure.

Ellis' first three seasons in the SBL saw him average over 22 points per game. With the league's change from 48-minute games to 40-minute games in 2017, his scoring average dropped to 17 per game, which then dropped to 14.5 and 13.4 in 2018 and 2019 respectively.

Due to the COVID-19 pandemic, the 2020 SBL season was cancelled. Ellis later played for the Senators in the West Coast Classic, where they won the title with a 96–81 victory over the Perry Lakes Hawks in the grand final. In 13 games, he averaged 14.69 points, 4.62 rebounds and 5.08 assists per game.

In December 2020, Ellis re-signed with the Senators for the 2021 NBL1 West season. In 23 games, he averaged 17.17 points, 5.65 rebounds, 4.47 assists and 1.82 steals per game.

In December 2021, Ellis re-signed with the Senators for the 2022 NBL1 West season. He was limited to 15 games in 2022 due to a knee injury, averaging 18.2 points, 5.0 rebounds, 3.07 assists, 1.27 steals and 1.07 blocks per game.

In January 2023, Ellis re-signed with the Senators for the 2023 NBL1 West season. In May 2023, he played his 200th SBL/NBL1 game. In 20 games, he averaged 15.85 points, 3.9 rebounds, 2.6 assists and 1.15 steals per game.

After initially retiring following the 2023 season, Ellis returned to the Senators in March 2024 for the 2024 NBL1 West season. In 16 games, he averaged 11.38 points, 4.06 rebounds and 2.63 assists per game.

In January 2025, Ellis re-signed with the Senators for the 2025 NBL1 West season. He injured a calf in the season opener. He went on to help the Senators reach the NBL1 West Grand Final, where they lost 81–78 to the Geraldton Buccaneers.

In March 2026, Ellis re-signed with the Senators for the 2026 NBL1 West season. In June 2026, he became the third Senators player to reach 250 SBL/NBL1 West games.

== National team career ==
Ellis played for the Australian Under 19 team, the Emus, at the 2009 FIBA Under-19 World Championship.

In June 2013, Ellis was selected in the Australian squad for the Stanković Cup in China and the Universiade in Russia, where he won gold and silver respectively.

== Personal life ==
Ellis is the son of retired Perth Wildcats legend, Mike Ellis. Ellis and his wife, Lauren, have a son.
