= Christophe Léonard =

French basketball player

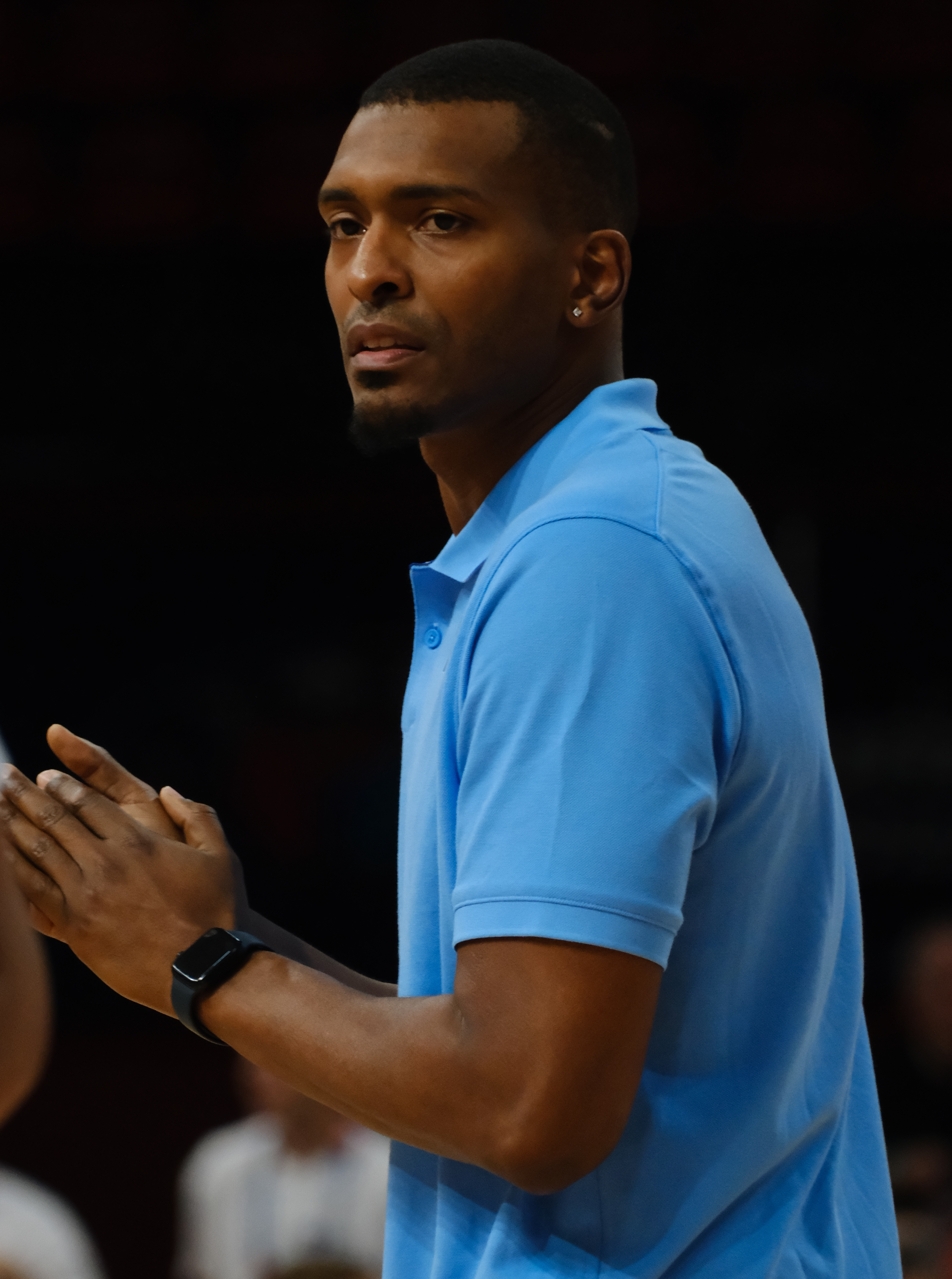

No. 12 – Poitiers Basket 86
- Position: Small forward

Personal information
- Born: 3 January 1990 (age 36) Schœlcher, Martinique, France
- Listed height: 1.99 m (6 ft 6 in)
- Listed weight: 97 kg (214 lb)

Career information
- Playing career: 2008–present

Career history
- 2008–2011: Cholet
- 2011–2012: Le Havre
- 2012–2014: Hyères-Toulon Var
- 2015–2016: JL Bourg
- 2016–present: Poitiers 86

Career highlights
- French Pro A champion (2010); French Pro B Finals MVP (2016); French Pro B Leaders Cup winner (2016); French Pro B Leaders Cup MVP (2016)

Christophe Léonard (French pronunciation: [kʁistɔf leɔnaʁ]; born 3 January 1990) is a French professional basketball player, who is currently playing for Poitiers Basket 86 in the French LNB Pro B. A native of Schœlcher on Martinique, Leonard is 1.99 m (6 ft 6 in) and weighs 97 kg (214 lb).

== Professional career ==
Léonard was the French 2nd Division Finals MVP, and the French 2nd Cup MVP in 2016.

== National team career ==
Léonard was a part of the junior French national team that finished in place 8th at the 2009 FIBA Under-19 World Cup.
