= Mitchell Young =

Australian basketball player

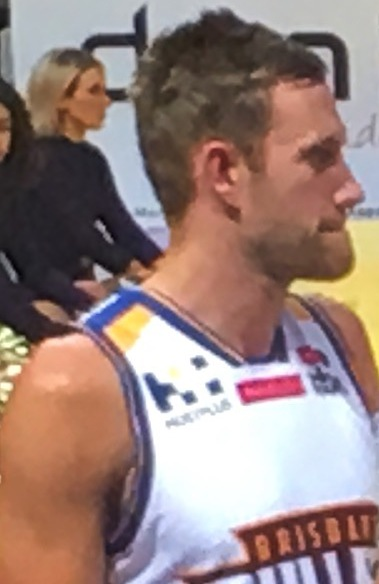
- Young with the Brisbane Bullets in 2016

Personal information
- Born: 6 August 1990 (age 36) Coffs Harbour, New South Wales
- Listed height: 6 ft 9 in (2.06 m)
- Listed weight: 235 lb (107 kg)

Career information
- High school: Brisbane State (Brisbane, Queensland)
- College: Saint Mary's (2009–2013)
- NBA draft: 2013: undrafted
- Playing career: 2007–2023
- Position: Power forward

Career history
- 2007–2009: Australian Institute of Sport
- 2013–2015: Cairns Taipans
- 2014: Cairns Marlins
- 2015–2023: Logan Thunder
- 2015–2016: Townsville Crocodiles
- 2016–2018: Brisbane Bullets
- 2018–2019: Cairns Taipans

Career highlights
- QBL All-League Team (2018)

Mitchell Young (born 6 August 1990) is an Australian former professional basketball player. He played college basketball for the Saint Mary's Gaels before playing six seasons in the National Basketball League (NBL).

== Early life ==
Young grew up playing for the Logan Thunder Junior Basketball Club before attending the Australian Institute of Sport (AIS) in Canberra, where he played for the AIS men's team in the South East Australian Basketball League between 2007 and 2009.

== College career ==
Young played college basketball at Saint Mary's alongside Matthew Dellavedova from 2009 to 2013. In his freshman year, Young registered 3.9 points, 2.8 rebounds, and 0.6 blocks per game. He increased those numbers to 10.2 points and 5.1 rebounds per game as a sophomore and led the West Coast Conference in field goal percentage. He was named the WCC Co-Player of the Week on 27 December 2010. Young averaged 4.6 points and 2.8 rebounds per game and shot .607 from the field as a junior but was hampered by injuries to his groin and foot. As a senior, Young averaged 7.7 points and 5.6 rebounds per game and started all 35 games.

== Professional career ==
After graduating from college, Young returned to Australia and joined the Cairns Taipans on a two-year deal. In 60 games for the Taipans over two seasons, he averaged 3.5 points and 2.6 rebounds per game. During the 2014 off-season, he played for the Cairns Marlins in the Queensland Basketball League. In 2015, he played for the Logan Thunder QBL team for the first time.

After playing for the Townsville Crocodiles during the 2015–16 NBL season, Young spent the next two NBL seasons with the Brisbane Bullets. In 2016, 2017, and 2018, Young played for the Logan Thunder in the QBL. The 2018 season saw Young earn QBL All-League Team honours for his 22.7 points and league-leading 12 rebounds per game.

Young returned to the Cairns Taipans for the 2018–19 NBL season. In July 2019, he announced his retirement from the NBL after six seasons and 163 games.

Young played every year for the Logan Thunder between 2019 and 2023.

== Personal life ==
Young's parents are Graham and Julie Young, and he has two younger brothers, Billy and Zach. Young majored in business administration at Saint Mary's.

In July 2019, Young was appointed general manager of Logan Basketball. He resigned from Logan Basketball in July 2026 after seven years as general manager.
