= Mangisto Arop =

South Sudanese-Canadian basketball player

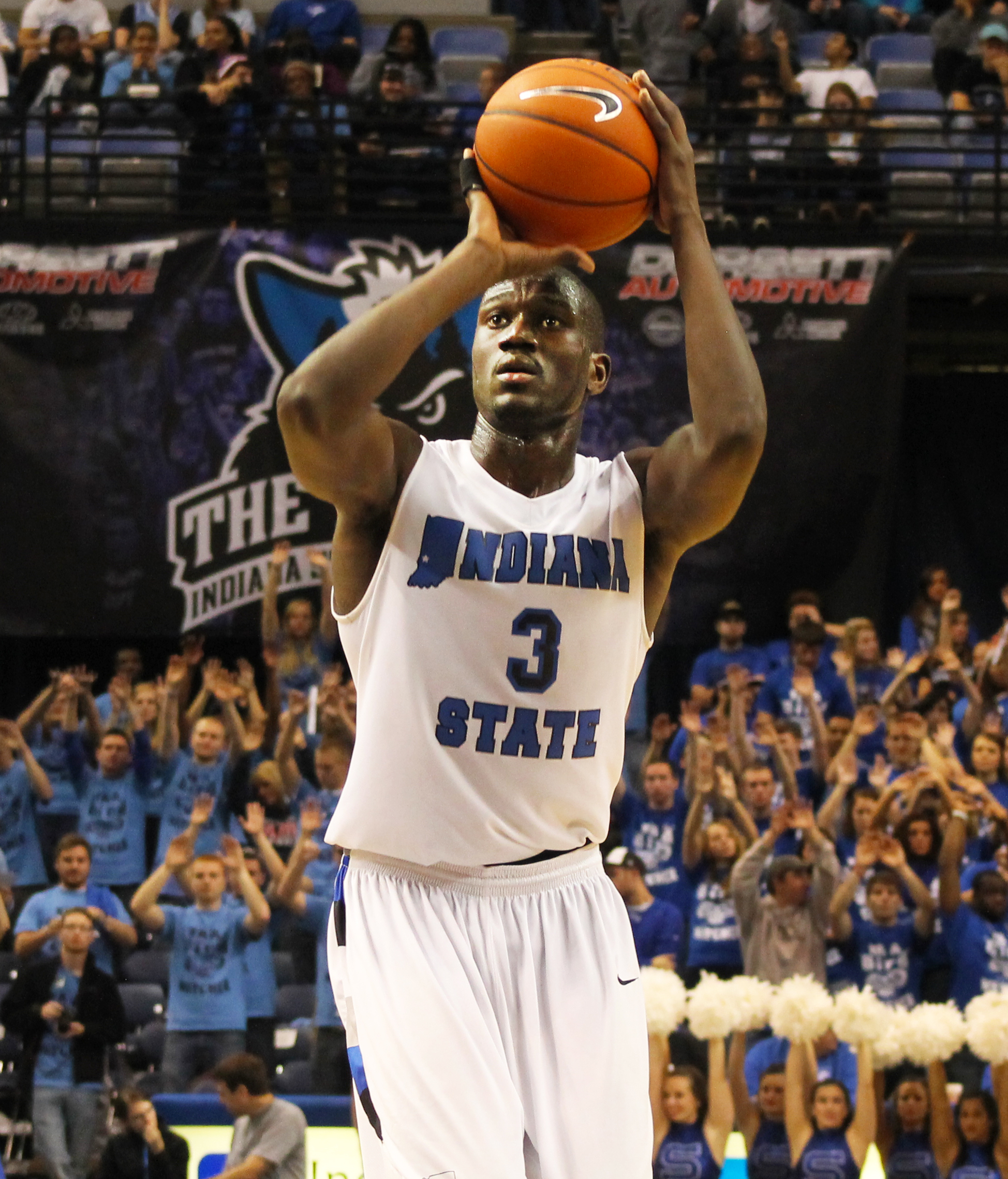

No. 15 – Finke Baskets
- Position: Shooting guard / small forward
- League: ProA

Personal information
- Born: October 1, 1990 (age 36) Abyei, Sudan
- Listed height: 6 ft 6 in (1.98 m)
- Listed weight: 215 lb (98 kg)

Career information
- High school: Ross Sheppard (Edmonton, Alberta)
- College: Gonzaga (2009–2011); Indiana State (2012–2014)
- NBA draft: 2014: undrafted
- Playing career: 2014–present

Career history
- 2014–2015: Norrkoping Dolphins
- 2015-2016: Finke Baskets
- 2016–2017: Niagara River Lions
Medals
Representing Canada
Men's basketball
FIBA Americans Under-18 Championship Games
Bronze medal – third place	2008 San Juan	Team competition

Mangisto "Manny" Arop (born October 1, 1990) is a South Sudanese-Canadian professional basketball player who last played for Finke Baskets of the ProA. He is a 6 ft 6 in (1.98 m) tall small forward/shooting guard.

== College career ==
Arop played college basketball at Indiana State University, from 2012 to 2014. He helped lead the Sycamores to a 2-yr record of 41-26 (.612); including 3 wins over "Power 5" conference schools and 2 post-season NIT berths.

He currently ranks in the top 75 in career scoring (744 pts), 20th in career defensive rebounds (250), 25th in 3-pointers (78), 34th in blocks (28), 28th games started (63).

Prior to the 2011–12 season; Arop spent two seasons at Gonzaga University; appearing in 59 games for the Bulldogs.

== Professional career ==
After going undrafted in the 2014 NBA draft, Arop signed with the Swedish pro club, Norrkoping Dolphins. He started 39 games for the Dolphins, posting a 9.0 ppg average and 4.5 rbg average and helping them to a 3rd-place finish in the Basketligan; he scored 54 points (10.8 ppg) in the Basketligan playoffs. On July 7, 20125; following the Dolphins season, Arop signed with Finke Baskets of Germany. However, he only played two official matches for the team before the two sides parted ways now rig hand.

== FIBA career ==
Arop was a member of 4 Canadian National teams; Canadian University National Team (2013), Canadian Junior National Team (2011), Canadian U-19 National Team (2009) and the Canadian U-18 National Team (2008). He was named to the All-World Championships U-19 team (Honorable Mention) during the 2009 Championships.

== Awards and accomplishments ==
=== College ===
- Missouri Valley Conference tournament All-Tournament Team: (2014)
- Missouri Valley Conference All-Conference Team (Honorable Mention): (2014)
- Missouri Valley Conference Tournament Finalist (2014)
- Missouri Valley Conference Regular Season Runner Up (2014)
- West Coast Conference Tournament Winner (2011)
- West Coast Conference Tournament Finalist (2010)
- West Coast Conference Regular Season Champion (2010)

=== Canadian National Team ===
- All World Championships U-19 Honorable Mention (2009)
- Nike Global Challenge All-Tournament Team (2009)
