= Matías Nocedal =

Argentine basketball player

Matías Nocedal (born May 30, 1990) is an Argentine professional basketball player. He plays at the point guard and shooting guard positions. He is 1.94 m (6 ft 4 ½ in) in height and 91 kg (200 lbs.) in weight. He is currently with the pro club Basket Jesi in Legadue the second main Italian division. He was born in Ituzaingó, Buenos Aires.
