= Fabien Paschal =

French basketball player

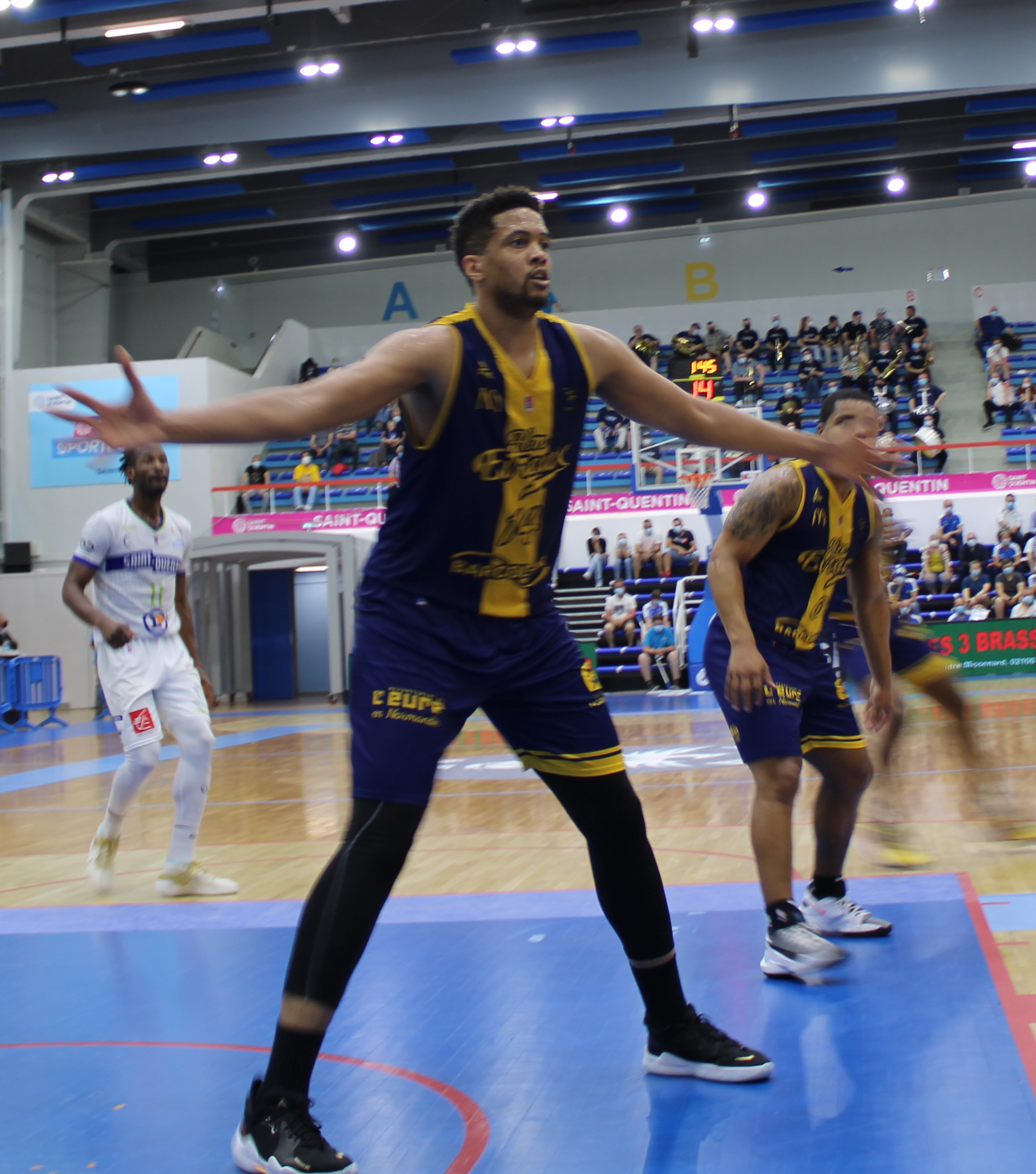
- Fabien Paschal.jpg

No. 14 – BCM Gravelines
- Position: Power forward
- League: LNB Pro A

Personal information
- Born: April 17, 1991 (age 35) Creteil, France
- Listed height: 2.08 m (6 ft 10 in)

Career information
- Playing career: 2010–present

Career history
- 2010–2014: STB Le Havre
- 2014–present: BCM Gravelines
Medals
Men's basketball
Representing France
FIBA Europe Under-18 Championship
Silver medal – second place	2009 France	U-18 Team

Fabien Paschal (born April 17, 1991 in Creteil, France) is a French basketball player who plays for French Pro A League club Le Havre.

== Career ==
Paschal signed a 3-year contract with BCM Gravelines in May 2014.
