= Jonathan Bourhis =

French basketball player (1990–2009)

Personal information
- Born: 10 October 1990 Tours, France
- Died: 1 November 2009 (aged 19) Veuvey-sur-Ouche, France
- Listed height: 1.82 m (6 ft 0 in)
- Listed weight: 80 kg (176 lb)

Career information
- Playing career: 2008–2009
- Position: Point guard

Career history
- 2008–2009: JDA Dijon

Career highlights
- French Espoirs Championship leading scorer (2009); French Espoirs Championship assists leader (2009)

Jonathan Bourhis (10 October 1990, in Tours – 1 November 2009) was a professional basketball player for JDA Dijon. He died in a car accident on 1 November 2009 at the age of 19. He was considered a very talented player and one of the best hopes of French basketball. His death was reported to be a "bad hit" for his team.
