= 2008 FIBA Europe Under-18 Championship =

International basketball competition

2008 FIBA U18 European Championship
25th FIBA Under-18 European Basketball Championship
- 2008 FIBA Europe Under-18 Championship

Tournament details
- Host country: Greece
- Dates: July 25 – August 3
- Teams: 16 (from 49 federations)
- Venues: 2 (in 2 host cities)

Final positions
- Champions: Greece (1st title)

Tournament statistics
- MVP: (Lithuania) Donatas Motiejūnas
- Top scorer: (Bulgaria) Zahariev (19.2)
- Top rebounds: (Turkey) Kanter (14.6)
- Top assists: (Croatia) Prostran (5.0)
- PPG (Team): Spain (85.0)
- RPG (Team): Lithuania (43.1)
- APG (Team): Bulgaria (14.5)

Official website
- Official website (archive)

The 2008 FIBA Europe Under-18 Championship was an international basketball competition held in Greece from July 25, 2008 until August 3. The hosts, Greeks, emerged as the champions after beating the Lithuanians in the final, 57–50 to clinch their first European Under-18 championship. The tournament served as the European Qualifiers for the 2009 FIBA Under-19 World Championship.

== Participating teams ==
Group A	Group B	Group C	Group D
Belgium; Greece; Israel; Spain	Estonia; Italy; Lithuania; Serbia	France; Germany; Russia; Ukraine	Bulgaria; Croatia; Latvia; Turkey

== Squads ==
At the start of tournament, all 16 participating countries will have 12 players on their roster.

== Venues ==
City	Arena	Capacity
Amaliada	Municipal Indoor Arena of Amaliada	2,000
Pyrgos	Municipal Indoor Arena of Pyrgos	3,000

== Format ==
- PRELIMINARY ROUND: 4 groups of 4 teams each, playing in a single round-robin elimination. The top 3 teams advance to the second round while the last placed team being eliminated.
- SECOND ROUND: 12 teams left will be divided into 2 groups of six teams. All of the results earned from the second round shall be carried over to this round. The top two teams in both groups qualify for the semifinals and to the 2009 FIBA Under-19 Basketball World Cup. The remaining teams then proceed to their respective classification playoffs.
- FINAL ROUND:
  - 4-team knockout stage for the CHAMPIONSHIP;
  - 4-team knockout stage for 5th–8th place classification playoffs;
  - 4-team knockout stage for 9th–12th place classification playoffs.

== Preliminary round ==
Teams are divided equally in 4 groups of four teams each and they will play in a single round-robin format. The top three teams in each group qualified for the second round while the last teams in each group were eliminated.

All times are local, UTC+3.

=== Group A ===
Pos	Team	Pld	W	L	PF	PA	PD	Pts	Qualification
1	Greece (H)	3	3	0	232	195	+37	6	Advanced to the second round
2	Spain	3	2	1	248	211	+37	5	Advanced to the second round
3	Israel	3	1	2	196	234	−38	4	Advanced to the second round
4	Belgium	3	0	3	182	218	−36	3	Eliminated

Source: Unknown
Rules for classification: 1) Points; 2) Goal difference; 3) Number of goals scored;
(H) Hosts

July 25
14:00

Belgium	58–64	Israel
Scoring by quarter: 24–18, 7–15, 13–14, 14–17

Pyrgos Municipal Indoor Arena, Pyrgos

July 25
19:00

Greece	77–73	Spain
Scoring by quarter: 19–12, 19–15, 16–19, 23–27

Pyrgos Municipal Indoor Arena, Pyrgos

July 26
14:30

Spain	88–69	Belgium
Scoring by quarter: 24–19, 21–17, 20–11, 23–22

Amaliada Municipal Indoor Arena, Amaliada

July 26
19:00

Israel	67–89	Greece
Scoring by quarter: 14–21, 18–20, 24–20, 11–28

Amaliada Municipal Indoor Arena, Amaliada

July 27
14:30

Israel	65–87	Spain
Scoring by quarter: 21–12, 23–19, 10–29, 11–27

Pyrgos Municipal Indoor Arena, Pyrgos

July 27
19:00

Greece	66–55	Belgium
Scoring by quarter: 20–14, 19–18, 11–14, 16–9

Pyrgos Municipal Indoor Arena, Pyrgos

=== Group B ===
Pos	Team	Pld	W	L	PF	PA	PD	Pts	Qualification
1	Lithuania	3	3	0	231	205	+26	6	Advanced to the second round
2	Serbia	3	2	1	227	178	+49	5	Advanced to the second round
3	Italy	3	1	2	192	219	−27	4	Advanced to the second round
4	Estonia	3	0	3	165	213	−48	3	Eliminated

Source: Unknown
Rules for classification: 1) Points; 2) Goal difference; 3) Number of goals scored;

July 25
14:00

Estonia	60–65	Italy
Scoring by quarter: 14–17, 16–15, 15–20, 15–13

Pyrgos Municipal Indoor Arena, Pyrgos

July 25
21:15

Lithuania	83–68	Serbia
Scoring by quarter: 22–20, 21–18, 24–14, 16–16

Pyrgos Municipal Indoor Arena, Pyrgos

July 26
16:45

Serbia	76–41	Estonia
Scoring by quarter: 23–7, 20–15, 19–8, 14–11

Amaliada Municipal Indoor Arena, Amaliada

July 26
21:15

Italy	73–76	Lithuania
Scoring by quarter: 11–20, 26–17, 17–21, 19–18

Amaliada Municipal Indoor Arena, Amaliada

July 27
16:45

Lithuania	72–64	Estonia
Scoring by quarter: 25–21, 21–12, 8–16, 18–15

Pyrgos Municipal Indoor Arena, Pyrgos

July 27
21:15

Italy	54–83	Serbia
Scoring by quarter: 7–24, 15–30, 17–16, 15–13

Pyrgos Municipal Indoor Arena, Pyrgos

=== Group C ===
Pos	Team	Pld	W	L	PF	PA	PD	Pts	Qualification
1	France	3	2	1	213	192	+21	5 (Note: France wins tiebreaker over Russia via head-to-head record.)	Advanced to the second round
2	Russia	3	2	1	230	207	+23	5	Advanced to the second round
3	Ukraine	3	1	2	190	209	−19	4 (Note: Ukraine wins tiebreaker over Germany via head-to-head record.)	Advanced to the second round
4	Germany	3	1	2	207	232	−25	4	Eliminated

Source: Unknown
Rules for classification: 1) Points; 2) Goal difference; 3) Number of goals scored;
Notes:

July 25
16:15

Germany	81–73	France
Scoring by quarter: 13–9, 21–29, 20–19, 27–16

Amaliada Municipal Indoor Arena, Amaliada

July 25
19:00

Ukraine	64–86	Russia
Scoring by quarter: 9–26, 17–14, 14–21, 24–25

Amaliada Municipal Indoor Arena, Amaliada

July 26
14:30

Russia	83–73	Germany
Scoring by quarter: 37–20, 14–19, 16–11, 16–23

Pyrgos Municipal Indoor Arena, Pyrgos

July 26
21:15

France	70–50	Ukraine
Scoring by quarter: 19–12, 14–14, 19–12, 18–12

Pyrgos Municipal Indoor Arena, Pyrgos

July 27
14:30

Ukraine	76–53	Germany
Scoring by quarter: 14–19, 20–15, 20–8, 22–11

Amaliada Municipal Indoor Arena, Amaliada

July 27
21:15

France	70–61	Russia
Scoring by quarter: 15–10, 17–18, 19–20, 19–13

Amaliada Municipal Indoor Arena, Amaliada

=== Group D ===
Pos	Team	Pld	W	L	PF	PA	PD	Pts	Qualification
1	Croatia	3	3	0	249	218	+31	6	Advanced to the second round
2	Turkey	3	2	1	238	241	−3	5	Advanced to the second round
3	Latvia	3	1	2	218	233	−15	4	Advanced to the second round
4	Bulgaria	3	0	3	224	237	−13	3	Eliminated

Source: Unknown
Rules for classification: 1) Points; 2) Goal difference; 3) Number of goals scored;

July 25
14:00

Latvia	70–87	Croatia
Scoring by quarter: 19–21, 17–22, 17–21, 17–23

Amaliada Municipal Indoor Arena, Amaliada

July 25
21:15

Bulgaria	82–86	Turkey
Scoring by quarter: 8–24, 29–22, 19–23, 26–17

Amaliada Municipal Indoor Arena, Amaliada

July 26
16:45

Turkey	71–68	Latvia
Scoring by quarter: 26–22, 19–21, 9–14, 17–11

Pyrgos Municipal Indoor Arena, Pyrgos

July 26
19:00

Croatia	71–67	Bulgaria
Scoring by quarter: 14–17, 14–11, 18–23, 25–16

Pyrgos Municipal Indoor Arena, Pyrgos

July 27
14:30

Latvia	80–75	Bulgaria
Scoring by quarter: 25–18, 18–26, 17–13, 20–18

Amaliada Municipal Indoor Arena, Amaliada

July 27
19:00

Turkey	81–91	Croatia
Scoring by quarter: 19–25, 15–16, 22–20, 25–30

Amaliada Municipal Indoor Arena, Amaliada

== Second round ==
=== Group E ===
Pos	Team	Pld	W	L	PF	PA	PD	Pts	Qualification
1	Greece	5	5	0	378	316	+62	10	Qualified to the semi-finals and to the World Cup
2	Lithuania	5	3	2	356	351	+5	8	Qualified to the semi-finals and to the World Cup
3	Spain	5	2	3	396	397	−1	7 (Note: 1–1 win–loss record against each other, 1.0083 in head-to-head quotient system to win third place)	Qualified for the 5–8th place classification playoffs
4	Serbia	5	2	3	364	361	+3	7 (Note: 1–1 win–loss record against each other, 0.9975 in head-to-head quotient system to win fourth place)	Qualified for the 5–8th place classification playoffs
5	Israel	5	2	3	326	391	−65	7 (Note: 1–1 win–loss record against each other, 0.8337 in head-to-head quotient system to win fifth place)	Relegated for the 9–12th place classification playoffs
6	Italy	5	1	4	363	367	−4	6	Relegated for the 9–12th place classification playoffs

Source: Unknown
Rules for classification: 1) Points; 2) Goal difference; 3) Number of goals scored;
Notes:

29 July 2008	Israel	72–61	Lithuania	Pyrgos
16:45	Scoring by quarter: 13–19, 17–12, 19–20, 23–10
	Pts: Tamir Ariely 20; Rebs: Ben Reis 13; Asts: Ron Sabag 7	Boxscore	Pts: Motiejūnas 18; Rebs: Motiejūnas 14; Asts: Kristijonas Gaska 3	Arena: Pyrgos Indoor Municipal Arena; Referees: Marek Maliszewski (POL), Aleksander Gorshkov (RUS), Nicolas Maestre (FRA)

29 July 2008	Italy	63–68	Greece	Pyrgos
19:00	Scoring by quarter: 13–9, 16–16, 12–26, 22–17
	Pts: Andrea Muner 13; Rebs: Andrea Muner 6 Asts: Cournooh 3	Boxscore	Pts: Sarikopoulos 17; Rebs: Sarikopoulos 11; Asts: Mantzaris 9	Arena: Pyrgos Indoor Municipal Arena; Attendance: 1,000; Referees: Dubravko Muhvic (CRO), Vladimir Tsekov (BUL), Petros Christophides (CYP)

29 July 2008	Serbia	93–87	Spain	Pyrgos
21:15	Scoring by quarter: 42–19, 10–26, 24–20, 17–22
		Boxscore		Arena: Pyrgos Indoor Municipal Arena

30 July 2008	Italy	vs.	Israel	Pyrgos
	Scoring by quarter: –, –, –, –
				Arena: Pyrgos Indoor Municipal Arena

30 July 2008	Greece	vs.	Serbia	Pyrgos
	Scoring by quarter: –, –, –, –
				Arena: Pyrgos Indoor Municipal Arena

30 July 2008	Spain	vs.	Lithuania	Pyrgos
	Scoring by quarter: –, –, –, –
				Arena: Pyrgos Indoor Municipal Arena

31 July 2008	Serbia	vs.	Israel	Pyrgos
	Scoring by quarter: –, –, –, –
				Arena: Pyrgos Indoor Municipal Arena

31 July 2008	Lithuania	vs.	Greece	Pyrgos
	Scoring by quarter: –, –, –, –
				Arena: Pyrgos Indoor Municipal Arena

31 July 2008	Spain	vs.	Italy	Pyrgos
	Scoring by quarter: –, –, –, –
				Arena: Pyrgos Indoor Municipal Arena

July 30
16:30

Italy	93–57	Israel
Scoring by quarter: 23–11, 18–17, 22–17, 30–12

Pyrgos, Greece

July 30
19:00

Greece	72–59	Serbia
Scoring by quarter: 19–11, 18–10, 20–12, 15–26

Pyrgos, Greece

July 30
21:30

Spain	66–82	Lithuania
Scoring by quarter: 13–25, 16–18, 21–18, 16–21

Pyrgos, Greece

July 31
16:30

Serbia	61–65	Israel
Scoring by quarter: 18–25, 12–10, 19–16, 12–14

Pyrgos, Greece

July 31
19:00

Lithuania	54–72	Greece

Pyrgos, Greece

July 31
21:30

Spain	83–80	Italy
Scoring by quarter: 22–21, 15–25, 27–19, 19–15

Pyrgos, Greece

=== Group F ===
Pos	Team	Pld	W	L	PF	PA	PD	Pts	Qualification
1	France	5	4	1	359	331	+28	9	Qualified to the semi-finals and to the 2009 FIBA Basketball Under-19 World Cup
2	Croatia	5	3	2	415	386	+29	8	Qualified to the semi-finals and to the 2009 FIBA Basketball Under-19 World Cup
3	Russia	5	3	2	389	361	+28	8	Qualified for the 5–8th place classification playoffs
4	Latvia	5	3	2	389	346	+43	8	Qualified for the 5–8th place classification playoffs
5	Turkey	5	2	3	373	393	−20	7	Relegated for the 9–12th place classification playoffs
6	Ukraine	5	0	5	313	415	−102	5	Relegated for the 9–12th place classification playoffs

Source: Unknown
Rules for classification: 1) Points; 2) Point difference; 3) Number of points scored;

July 29
16:45

Latvia	83–62	France
Scoring by quarter: 18–10, 22–16, 25–14, 18–22

Pyrgos, Greece

July 29
19:00

Turkey	72–82	Russia
Scoring by quarter: 16–18, 15–20, 27–28, 14–16

Pyrgos, Greece

July 29
21:15

Ukraine	76–88	Croatia
Scoring by quarter: 20–27, 13–14, 18–26, 25–21

Pyrgos, Greece

July 30
16:45

France	83–64	Turkey
Scoring by quarter: 18–19, 24–17, 26–14, 15–14

Pyrgos, Greece

July 30
19:00

Latvia	86–54	Ukraine
Scoring by quarter: 14–8, 24–12, 24–16, 24–18

Pyrgos, Greece

July 30
21:15

Russia	85–76	Croatia
Scoring by quarter: 16–21, 27–20, 23–15, 19–20

Pyrgos, Greece

July 31
16:45

Turkey	85–69	Ukraine
Scoring by quarter: 26–16, 15–16, 10–18, 34–19

Pyrgos, Greece

July 31
19:00

Croatia	73–74	France
Scoring by quarter: 22–24, 12–23, 25–20, 14–7

Pyrgos, Greece

July 31
21:15

Russia	75–79	Latvia
Scoring by quarter: 22–20, 21–13, 18–24, 14–22

Pyrgos, Greece

== Classification playoffs ==
=== 9th–12th place classification playoffs ===
Classification Semifinals
August 2
Turkey	80
Italy	73
August 2
Israel	76
Ukraine	75

Ninth place match
August 3
Turkey	95
Israel	72
Eleventh place match
August 3
Italy	84
Ukraine	68

==== Classification Semifinals ====
August 2

Amaliada Municipal Indoor Arena, Amaliada

August 2

Amaliada Municipal Indoor Arena, Amaliada

==== Eleventh place match ====
August 3

Amaliada Municipal Indoor Arena, Amaliada

==== Ninth place match ====
August 3

Amaliada Municipal Indoor Arena, Amaliada

=== 5th–8th place classification playoffs ===
Classification Semifinals
August 2
Russia	63
Serbia	85
August 2
Spain	107
Latvia	91

Fifth place match
August 3
Serbia	85
Spain	89
Seventh place match
August 3
Russia	69
Latvia	71

==== Classification Semifinals ====
August 2

August 2

==== Seventh place match ====
August 3

==== Fifth place match ====
Winner qualified for the World Cup.

August 3

== Final round ==
All times are local, UTC+3.

Semifinals
August 2
Greece	82
Croatia	62
August 2
France	55
Lithuania	79

Final
August 3
Greece	57
Lithuania	50
Bronze medal match
August 3
Croatia	73
France	68

=== Semifinals ===
August 2

Greece	82–62	Croatia

Pyrgos Municipal Indoor Arena, Pyrgos

August 2

France	55–79	Lithuania

Pyrgos Municipal Indoor Arena, Pyrgos

=== Bronze medal match ===
August 3
17:45

Croatia	73–68	France
Scoring by quarter: 13–20, 17–24, 24–16, 14–13
Pts: Delas 18; Rebs: Delas 14; Asts: Prostran 7		Pts: Lang 15; Rebs: Tanghe 6 Asts: Albicy 5

Pyrgos Municipal Indoor Arena, Pyrgos
Attendance: 1,500
Referees: Kestutis Palipauskas (LTU), Serge De Coster (BEL), Leonidas Spiridonos (GRE)

=== Final ===
August 3
20:30

Greece	57–50	Lithuania
Scoring by quarter: 6–11, 21–14, 16–13, 14–12
Pts: Sloukas 16; Rebs: Sarikopoulos 10; Asts: Sloukas 3		Pts: Motiejūnas 17; Rebs: Slezas 10; Asts: Peicukevicius 2

Pyrgos Municipal Indoor Arena, Pyrgos
Attendance: 2,500
Referees: Dubravko Muhvic (CRO), Roman Kolar (SLO), Branislav Mrdak (SRB)

== Final standings ==
The top 5 teams qualified for the 2009 FIBA Under-19 World Championship.

Pos	Team
1st place, gold medalist(s)	Greece
2nd place, silver medalist(s)	Lithuania
3rd place, bronze medalist(s)	Croatia
4	France
5	Spain
6	Serbia
7	Latvia
8	Russia
9	Turkey
10	Israel
11	Italy
12	Ukraine
13	Bulgaria
14	Germany
15	Belgium
16	Estonia

Updated to match(es) played on unknown. Source:

== Awards ==
2008 Under-18 European Championship winner

Greece
First title

Most Valuable Player

All-Tournament Team

- (Croatia) Mario Delas
- (Greece) Kostas Sloukas
- (Greece) Nikos Pappas
- (Turkey) Enes Kanter
- (Lithuania) Donatas Motiejūnas
