= Sokratis Psaropoulos =

Greek basketball player

Sokratis Psaropoulos Σωκράτης Ψαρόπουλος
No. 9 – Tritonas
- Position: Shooting guard
- League: Greek A2 League

Personal information
- Born: May 6, 1992 (age 34) Maroussi, Athens, Greece
- Listed height: 6 ft 3 in (1.91 m)
- Listed weight: 190 lb (86 kg)

Career information
- NBA draft: 2014: undrafted
- Playing career: 2008–present

Career history
- 2008–2012: Peristeri
- 2012–2013: Filathlitikos
- 2013–2015: Pagrati
- 2015–2016: Peristeri
- 2016–2017: Pagrati
- 2017–2018: ASK Karditsas
- 2018–2019: Tritonas
- 2019–2020: Neaniki Estia Megaridos

Career highlights
- Greek 2nd Division champion (2009)

Sokratis Psaropoulos (Greek: Σωκράτης Ψαρόπουλος; born May 6, 1992) is a Greek professional basketball player, playing for Triton BC. He is 1.91 m (6 ft 3 in) tall. He plays at the shooting guard position.

== Professional career ==
Psaropoulos began his professional career in the Greek Second Division with Peristeri, during the 2008–09 season. The team moved up to the Greek First Division, where he would play with them for three more seasons.

He would move back to the Greek Second Division, to play with Filathlitikos, for the 2012–13 season. During that season, Psaropoulos among with Antetokounmpo brothers, Giannis and Thanasis, as well as players like Nikos Gkikas, Michalis Kamperidis, and Christos Saloustros managed to take the 3rd place in the Greek 2nd Division.

On 2013, he joined Pagrati where he stayed until 2015, when he returned to Peristeri after 3 years.

== National team career ==
Psaropoulos played at the 2010 FIBA Europe Under-18 Championship and the 2011 FIBA Europe Under-20 Championship, with the junior national teams of Greece.
