= 2010 FIBA Europe Under-18 Championship =

International basketball competition

2010 FIBA U18 European Championship
27th FIBA Under-18 European Basketball Championship

Tournament details
- Host country: Lithuania
- Dates: 22 July-1 August 2010
- Teams: 16 (from 1 confederation)
- Venue: 2 (in 1 host city)

Final positions
- Champions: Lithuania (2nd title)

Tournament statistics
- MVP: (Lithuania) Jonas Valančiūnas
- Top scorer: (Italy) Alessandro Gentile (23.0)
- Top rebounds: (Lithuania) Jonas Valančiūnas (13.4)
- Top assists: (Russia) Alexander Varnakov (5.6)
- PPG (Team): Lithuania (84.2)
- RPG (Team): Ukraine (48.4)
- APG (Team): Poland (17.0)

Official website
- Official website (archive)

The 2010 FIBA Europe Under-18 Championship was the 27th edition of the FIBA Europe Under-18 Championship. 16 teams featured the competition, held in Lithuania from July 22 to August 1. Serbia was the defending champion. Lithuania won the title after beating Russia in the final.

== Teams ==
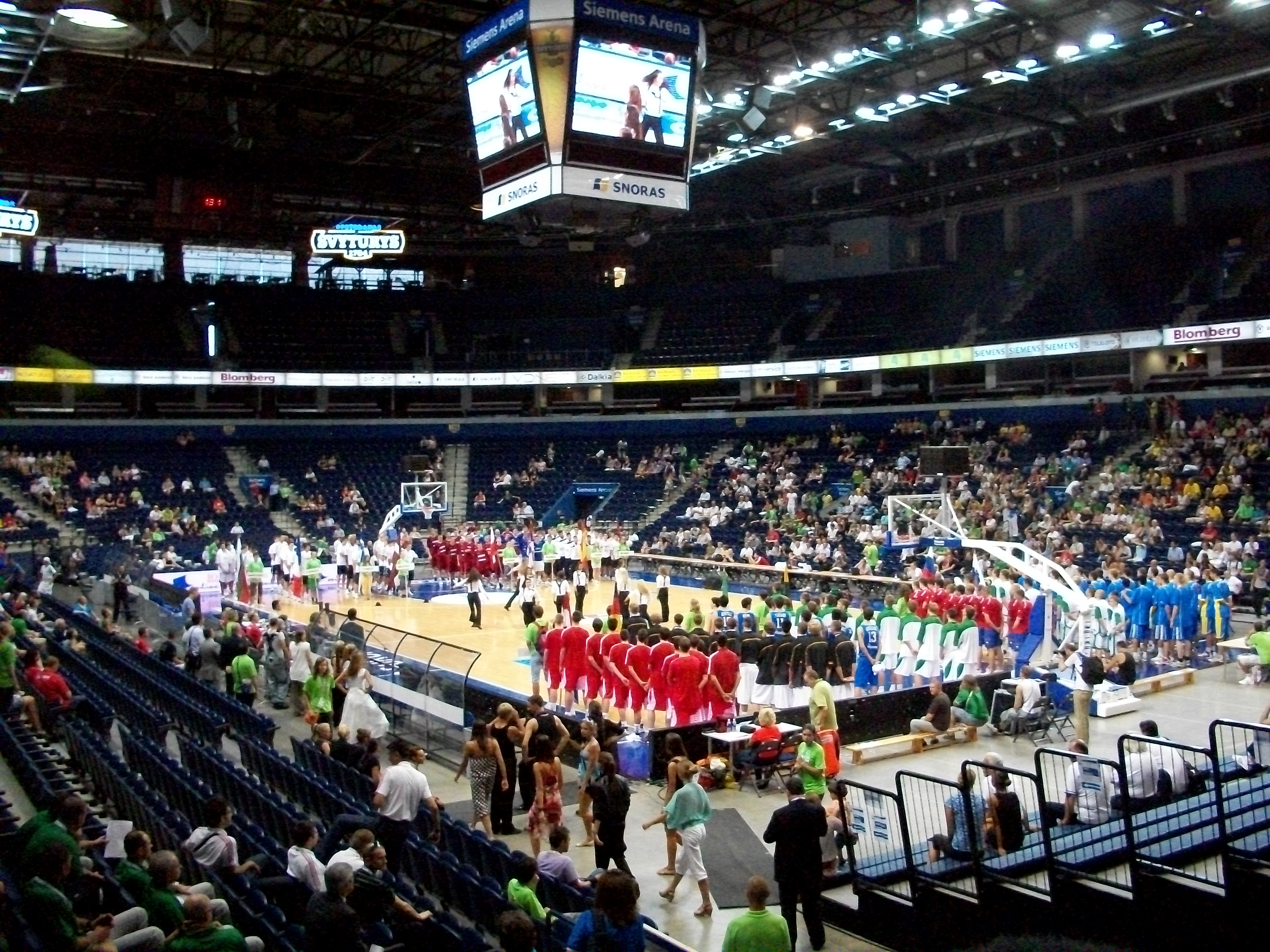
The championship opening ceremony at Siemens Arena

- Bulgaria
- Croatia
- France
- Germany
- Greece
- Italy
- Latvia
- Lithuania
- Poland
- Russia
- Serbia
- Slovenia
- Spain
- Sweden
- Turkey
- Ukraine

== Group stages ==
=== Preliminary round ===
In this round, the sixteen teams were allocated in four groups of four teams each. The top three qualified for the qualifying round. The last team of each group played for the 13th–16th place in the Classification Games.

Team advances to Qualifying round
Team will compete in Classification round

Times given below are in CEST (UTC+2).

==== Group A ====
Team	Pld	W	L	PF	PA	PD	Pts	Tiebreaker
Lithuania	3	3	0	258	195	+63	6	
Poland	3	2	1	231	236	−5	5	
Slovenia	3	1	2	229	238	−9	4	
Ukraine	3	0	3	187	236	−49	3	

July 22
16:15

Report

Slovenia	82–89	Poland
Scoring by quarter: 19–21, 25–28, 18–19, 20–21
Pts: Pajić 16; Rebs: Pajić 12; Asts: Špan 3		Pts: Ponitka 20; Rebs: Karnowski 13; Asts: Kwiatkowski 6

Siemens Arena, Vilnius
Attendance: 300
Referees: Ivo Dolinek, Xavier Castro Cartagena, Gentian Cici

July 22
19:00

Report

Lithuania	81–61	Ukraine
Scoring by quarter: 26–20, 16–9, 16–17, 23–15
Pts: Ulanovas 18; Rebs: Pukis 8 Asts: Čižauskas 7		Pts: Prokopenko 23; Rebs: Bobrov 7 Asts: Prokopenko 4

Siemens Arena, Vilnius
Attendance: 3,000
Referees: Robert Lottermoser, Milan Mažić, Athanasios Ikonomou

July 23
14:30

Report

Ukraine	59–79	Slovenia
Scoring by quarter: 19–21, 14–15, 13–21, 13–22
Pts: Len 21; Rebs: Len 12; Asts: Bobrov 6		Pts: Pajić 14; Rebs: Pajić 12; Asts: Špan 7

Lietuvos Rytas Arena, Vilnius
Attendance: 200
Referees: Siniša Herceg, Peter Bodnar, Carlos Mateus

July 23
19:00

Report

Poland	66–87	Lithuania
Scoring by quarter: 12–27, 18–29, 19–18, 17–13
Pts: Karnowski 13; Rebs: Bartoszewicz 8 Asts: Kwiatkowski 5		Pts: Valančiūnas, Pukis 16; Rebs: Valančiūnas 18; Asts: Simanavičius 5

Lietuvos Rytas Arena, Vilnius
Referees: Zoran Šutulović, Emilio Perez, Athanasios Ikonomou

July 24
14:30

Report

Poland	76–67	Ukraine
Scoring by quarter: 23–20, 12–11, 26–19, 15–17
Pts: Karnowski, Ponitka 15; Rebs: Karnowski 8 Asts: Grochowski 9		Pts: Motorchuk 15; Rebs: Len 11; Asts: Artamonov 6

Lietuvos Rytas Arena, Vilnius
Referees: Siniša Herceg, Ioannis Foufis, Rafael Ganiev

July 24
19:00

Report

Lithuania	90–68	Slovenia
Scoring by quarter: 28–20, 23–13, 18–14, 21–21
Pts: Valančiūnas, Pukis 18; Rebs: Valančiūnas 11; Asts: Čižauskas 4		Pts: Omić 22; Rebs: Špan 7 Asts: Rupnik, Špan 3

Siemens Arena, Vilnius
Attendance: 2,800
Referees: Luigi Lamonica, Milan Mažić, Ersan Kartal

==== Group B ====
Team	Pld	W	L	PF	PA	PD	Pts	Tiebreaker
Latvia	3	3	0	225	186	+39	6	
Spain	3	2	1	226	189	+37	5	
France	3	1	2	172	164	+8	4	
Sweden	3	0	3	157	241	−84	3	

July 22
14:00

Report

Sweden	58–89	Latvia
Scoring by quarter: 16–27, 12–19, 16–21, 14–22
Pts: Eriksson 11; Rebs: Magarity 8 Asts: Person 4		Pts: Dukulis 22; Rebs: Bertans 9 Asts: Magone 4

Siemens Arena, Vilnius
Attendance: 200
Referees: Siniša Herceg, Jurgis Laurinavicius, Rafael Ganiev

July 22
21:15

Report

France	57–61	Spain
Scoring by quarter: 12–17, 15–15, 19–13, 11–16
Pts: Keita 11; Rebs: Deal 7 Asts: Leon, Bigote 2		Pts: Tomas, Barrera 15; Rebs: Oriola 8 Asts: Creus 3

Siemens Arena, Vilnius
Attendance: 800
Referees: Luigi Lamonica, Tomas Jasevicius, Ioannis Foufis

July 23
16:45

Report

Latvia	61–58	France
Scoring by quarter: 21–19, 17–6, 14–23, 9–10
Pts: Dukulis 13; Rebs: Dukulis 8 Asts: Dukulis 3		Pts: Bigote 6 Rebs: Gobert 11; Asts: Leon 5

Lietuvos Rytas Arena, Vilnius
Attendance: 400
Referees: Ivo Dolinek, Andrej Lovšin, Ersan Kartal

July 23
21:15

Report

Spain	95–57	Sweden
Scoring by quarter: 24–16, 26–11, 27–15, 18–15
Pts: Servera 17; Rebs: Acosta, Mas 9 Asts: Servera 5		Pts: Norman 12; Rebs: Person 7 Asts: Person 4

Lietuvos Rytas Arena, Vilnius
Referees: Milan Mažić, Vladimir Tsekov, Sergiy Zashchuk

July 24
16:45

Report

Latvia	75–70	Spain
Scoring by quarter: 26–11, 15–23, 22–21, 12–15
Pts: Dukulis, Bertans 17; Rebs: Dukulis 10; Asts: Vecvagars 6		Pts: Barrera 14; Rebs: Oriola 10; Asts: three players 2

Siemens Arena, Vilnius
Attendance: 500
Referees: Zoran Šutulović, Robert Lottermoser, Gentian Cici

July 24
21:00

Report

France	57–42	Sweden
Scoring by quarter: 10–12, 13–6, 15–13, 19–11
Pts: Gobert 14; Rebs: Gobert 16; Asts: Bigote 2		Pts: Person 12; Rebs: Magarity 7 Asts: Person 3

Siemens Arena, Vilnius
Attendance: 100
Referees: Tomas Jasevicius, Tomasz Trawicki, Vladimir Tsekov

==== Group C ====
Team	Pld	W	L	PF	PA	PD	Pts	Tiebreaker
Italy	3	2	1	260	217	+43	5	1–1, +24
Russia	3	2	1	263	240	+23	5	1–1, −8
Turkey	3	2	1	237	239	−2	5	1–1, −16
Bulgaria	3	0	3	165	229	−64	3	

July 22
14:00

Report

Turkey	97–88 (OT)	Russia
Scoring by quarter: 22–18, 8–21, 17–20, 25–13, Overtime: 14–14, 11–2
Pts: Edge 35; Rebs: Dokuyan, Yildizli 8 Asts: Dokuyan 5		Pts: Karasev 17; Rebs: Karasev 11; Asts: Kulagin 6

Lietuvos Rytas Arena, Vilnius
Attendance: 100
Referees: Zoran Šutulović, Omer Esteron, Carlos Mateus

July 22
16:15

Report

Bulgaria	56–75	Italy
Scoring by quarter: 9–23, 11–16, 17–22, 19–14
Pts: Dimitrov 16; Rebs: Gospodinov 13; Asts: Dafinov 4		Pts: Gentile 21; Rebs: Pini 11; Asts: Gentile 5

Lietuvos Rytas Arena, Vilnius
Attendance: 50
Referees: Olegs Latisevs, Andrej Lovšin, Sergiy Zashchukv

July 23
14:30

Report

Russia	88–57	Bulgaria
Scoring by quarter: 27–5, 14–18, 22–18, 25–16
Pts: Goldyrev 13; Rebs: Kulagin 6 Asts: Kulagin 5		Pts: Simeonov, Ivanov 14; Rebs: Gospodinov 14; Asts: Simeonov 5

Siemens Arena, Vilnius
Attendance: 100
Referees: Robert Lottermoser, Jurgis Laurinavicius, Tomasz Trawicki

July 23
21:15

Report

Italy	99–74	Turkey
Scoring by quarter: 21–16, 28–18, 16–21, 34–19
Pts: Gentile 31; Rebs: Chillo 9 Asts: Sabbatino 9		Pts: Dokuyan 15; Rebs: Geyik 7 Asts: Eroglu 6

Siemens Arena, Vilnius
Attendance: 100
Referees: Romualdas Brazauskas, Ioannis Foufis, Gentian Cici

July 24
19:00

Report

Turkey	66–52	Bulgaria
Scoring by quarter: 16–11, 19–18, 15–9, 16–14
Pts: Yildizli 23; Rebs: Yildizli 9 Asts: Korkmaz, Edge 4		Pts: Dafinov 14; Rebs: Gospodinov 11; Asts: Dafinov 3

Lietuvos Rytas Arena, Vilnius
Attendance: 50
Referees: Olegs Latisevs, Peter Bodnar, Athanasios Ikonomou

July 24
21:15

Report

Italy	86–87	Russia
Scoring by quarter: 22–23, 15–24, 26–24, 23–16
Pts: Gentile 42; Rebs: Sgobba 8 Asts: Gentile 7		Pts: Trushkin 19; Rebs: Loginov 6 Asts: Varnakov 6

Lietuvos Rytas Arena, Vilnius
Attendance: 100
Referees: Emilio Perez, Xavier Castro Cartagena, Omer Esteron

==== Group D ====
Team	Pld	W	L	PF	PA	PD	Pts	Tiebreaker
Serbia	3	2	1	190	177	+13	5	1–1, +6
Croatia	3	2	1	211	199	+12	5	1–1, +4
Greece	3	2	1	185	185	0	5	1–1, −10
Germany	3	0	3	189	214	−25	3	

July 22
19:00

Report

Serbia	65–57	Croatia
Scoring by quarter: 22–16, 12–16, 15–13, 16–12
Pts: Bogdanović 12; Rebs: Gujaničić 9 Asts: Vujošević 5		Pts: Barać 15; Rebs: Barać 7 Asts: Four players 2

Lietuvos Rytas Arena, Vilnius
Referees: Romualdas Brazauskas, Peter Bodnar, Ersan Kartal

July 22
21:15

Report

Germany	55–65	Greece
Scoring by quarter: 12–14, 15–17, 18–14, 10–20
Pts: Heckmann 20; Rebs: Neumann 8 Asts: Theilig 3		Pts: Motsenigos 18; Rebs: Antonakis 8 Asts: Antonakis 4

Lietuvos Rytas Arena, Vilnius
Attendance: 75
Referees: Emilio Perez, Tomasz Trawicki, Vladimir Tsekov

July 23
16:45

Report

Greece	59–57	Serbia
Scoring by quarter: 9–14, 15–17, 18–14, 17–12
Pts: Chrysikopoulos 25; Rebs: Chrysikopoulos, Antonakis 8 Asts: Chrysikopoulos 3		Pts: Gujaničić 17; Rebs: Gujaničić, Bogdanović 9 Asts: Vujošević 3

Siemens Arena, Vilnius
Attendance: 150
Referees: Luigi Lamonica, Tomas Jasevicius, Omer Esteron

July 23
19:00

Report

Croatia	81–73	Germany
Scoring by quarter: 25–22, 21–17, 16–17, 19–17
Pts: Rogić, Šarić 22; Rebs: Three players 5 Asts: Šarić 3		Pts: Kramer 25; Rebs: Neumann, Kramer 7 Asts: Theilig 5

Siemens Arena, Vilnius
Attendance: 100
Referees: Olegs Latisevs, Xavier Castro Cartagena, Rafael Ganiev

July 24
14:30

Report

Serbia	68–61	Germany
Scoring by quarter: 21–14, 9–17, 17–14, 21–16
Pts: Bogdanović 15; Rebs: Bešović 9 Asts: Igrutinović 5		Pts: Heckmann 27; Rebs: Neumann 7 Asts: Theilig, Heckmann 2

Siemens Arena, Vilnius
Attendance: 200
Referees: Andrej Lovšin, Jurgis Laurinavicius, Carlos Mateus

July 24
21:00

Report

Greece	61–73	Croatia
Scoring by quarter: 4–13, 18–21, 19–25, 20–14
Pts: Mavrogiannis, Antonakis 15; Rebs: Chrysikopoulos 6 Asts: Three players 2		Pts: Rogić 17; Rebs: Three players 6 Asts: Katić 6

Lietuvos Rytas Arena, Vilnius
Referees: Romualdas Brazauskas, Ivo Dolinek, Sergiy Zashchuk

=== Qualifying round ===
The twelve teams remaining were allocated in two groups of six teams each. The four top teams advanced to the quarterfinals. The last two teams of each group played for the 9th–12th place.

Team advances to Quarterfinals
Team will compete in 9th–12th playoffs

==== Group E ====
Team	Pld	W	L	PF	PA	PD	Pts	Tiebreaker
Lithuania	5	5	0	436	330	+106	10	
Latvia	5	3	2	348	341	+7	8	
Poland	5	2	3	360	368	−8	7	1–1, +10
France	5	2	3	322	342	−20	7	1–1, 0
Spain	5	2	3	329	359	−30	7	1–1, −10
Slovenia	5	1	4	346	401	−55	6	

July 26
16:45

Report

Slovenia	76–74	Latvia
Scoring by quarter: 14–13, 24–19, 17–23, 21–19
Pts: Omić 19; Rebs: Omić 9 Asts: Rupnik, Špan 3		Pts: Dukulis 16; Rebs: Dukulis 10; Asts: Misters 3

Siemens Arena, Vilnius
Attendance: 300
Referees: Siniša Herceg, Gentian Cici, Athanasios Ikonomou

July 26
19:00

Report

France	63–104	Lithuania
Scoring by quarter: 22–26, 16–29, 15–19, 10–30
Pts: Diacono 13; Rebs: three players 4 Asts: Keita 3		Pts: Valančiūnas 34; Rebs: Valančiūnas 13; Asts: Cizauskas 9

Siemens Arena, Vilnius
Referees: Ivo Dolinek, Sergiy Zashchuk, Vladimir Tsekov

July 26
21:15

Report

Spain	67–81	Poland
Scoring by quarter: 17–22, 16–14, 18–20, 16–25
Pts: Ventura 17; Rebs: Ventura 7 Asts: Guerra 3		Pts: Gielo 17; Rebs: Sokołówski, Ponitka 11; Asts: four players 3

Siemens Arena, Vilnius
Attendance: 200
Referees: Luigi Lamonica, Milan Mažić, Ioannis Foufis

July 27
16:45

Report

France	75–51	Slovenia
Scoring by quarter: 21–14, 23–12, 20–10, 11–15
Pts: Keita 18; Rebs: Keita 8 Asts: Keita, Fauconnet 4		Pts: Pajić 11; Rebs: Pajić 6 Asts: Špan 4

Lietuvos Rytas Arena, Vilnius
Attendance: 100
Referees: Luigi Lamonica, Ioannis Foufis, Ersan Kartal

July 27
19:00

Report

Lithuania	77–58	Spain
Scoring by quarter: 20–14, 18–18, 24–17, 15–9
Pts: Valančiūnas 20; Rebs: Skucas 8 Asts: Cizauskas 6		Pts: Fernández, Oriola 9 Rebs: three players 4 Asts: Fernández 5

Lietuvos Rytas Arena, Vilnius
Attendance: 2,000
Referees: Siniša Herceg, Omer Esteron, Athanasios Ikonomou

July 27
21:15

Report

Poland	59–63	Latvia
Scoring by quarter: 11–14, 17–24, 8–14, 23–11
Pts: Gielo 13; Rebs: Ponitka 6 Asts: Kwiatkowski, Grochowski 4		Pts: Bertans 16; Rebs: Bertans 11; Asts: Vecvagars 7

Lietuvos Rytas Arena, Vilnius
Attendance: 200
Referees: Zoran Šutulović, Sergiy Zashchuk, Xavier Castro Cartagena

July 28
16:45

Report

Spain	73–69	Slovenia
Scoring by quarter: 20–22, 16–15, 15–11, 22–21
Pts: Guerra 19; Rebs: Acosta, Tomas 8 Asts: Servera 5		Pts: Omić 20; Rebs: Pajić 13; Asts: Rupnik 9

Siemens Arena, Vilnius
Attendance: 600
Referees: Zoran Šutulović, Robert Lottermoser, Xavier Castro Cartagena

July 28
19:00

Report

Latvia	75–78	Lithuania
Scoring by quarter: 15–25, 15–17, 21–12, 24–24
Pts: Dukulis 20; Rebs: Bertans, Vecvagars 7 Asts: Misters, Vecvagars 5		Pts: Valančiūnas 22; Rebs: Valančiūnas 17; Asts: Cizauskas 6

Siemens Arena, Vilnius
Attendance: 3,500
Referees: Luigi Lamonica, Milan Mažić, Ioannis Foufis

July 28
21:15

Report

Poland	65–69	France
Scoring by quarter: 15–19, 16–20, 14–10, 20–20
Pts: Michalak 15; Rebs: Karnowski 7 Asts: Kwiatkowski, Sokołówski 4		Pts: Ceci, Gobert 13; Rebs: Gobert 9 Asts: Leon 4

Siemens Arena, Vilnius
Attendance: 300
Referees: Siniša Herceg, Athanasios Ikonomou, Vladimir Tsekov

==== Group F ====
Team	Pld	W	L	PF	PA	PD	Pts	Tiebreaker
Russia	5	4	1	397	351	+46	9	
Serbia	5	3	2	411	353	+58	8	1–1, +6
Croatia	5	3	2	420	415	+5	8	1–1, +4
Greece	5	3	2	348	352	−4	8	1–1, −10
Italy	5	1	4	461	483	−22	6	
Turkey	5	1	4	428	463	−35	6	

July 26
16:45

Report

Greece	97–88	Italy
Scoring by quarter: 26–19, 24–17, 19–26, 28–26
Pts: Chrysikopoulos 25; Rebs: Chrysikopoulos 13; Asts: Psaropoulos, Antonakis 6		Pts: Gentile 21; Rebs: Chillo 6 Asts: Sabbatino 3

Lietuvos Rytas Arena, Vilnius
Attendance: 150
Referees: Robert Lottermoser, Omer Esteron, Jurgis Laurinavicius

July 26
19:00

Report

Croatia	55–78	Russia
Scoring by quarter: 12–21, 13–18, 14–22, 16–17
Pts: Zadravec 12; Rebs: Najev 7 Asts: Katić 3		Pts: Kulagin 16; Rebs: Pisarchuk 7 Asts: Varnakov 6

Lietuvos Rytas Arena, Vilnius
Referees: Zoran Šutulović, Olegs Latisevs, Carlos Mateus

July 26
21:15

Report

Turkey	49–63	Serbia
Scoring by quarter: 13–15, 8–20, 14–17, 14–11
Pts: Korkmaz 11; Rebs: Dokuyan, Geyik 7 Asts: Korkmaz, Edge 3		Pts: Silađi 11; Rebs: Bešović, Silađi 10; Asts: Petković 4

Lietuvos Rytas Arena, Vilnius
Attendance: 100
Referees: Romualdas Brazauskas, Tomasz Trawicki, Xavier Castro Cartagena

July 27
16:45

Report

Italy	61–72	Croatia
Scoring by quarter: 13–16, 19–15, 18–21, 11–20
Pts: Gentile 21; Rebs: Chillo 8 Asts: Sabbatino 3		Pts: Katić, Šarić 19; Rebs: Šarić 10; Asts: Katić, Šarić 4

Siemens Arena, Vilnius
Attendance: 100
Referees: Romualdas Brazauskas, Tomasz Trawicki, Gentian Cici

July 27
19:00

Report

Greece	79–65	Turkey
Scoring by quarter: 19–15, 21–22, 15–16, 24–12
Pts: Chrysikopoulos 30; Rebs: Chrysikopoulos 13; Asts: Psaropoulos 5		Pts: Korkmaz 15; Rebs: Senli 6 Asts: Korkmaz 3

Siemens Arena, Vilnius
Attendance: 150
Referees: Robert Lottermoser, Tomas Jasevicius, Vladimir Tsekov

July 27
21:15

Report

Russia	75–61	Serbia
Scoring by quarter: 21–14, 15–11, 21–17, 18–19
Pts: Kulagin 23; Rebs: Trushkin 9 Asts: Kulagin 8		Pts: Silađi 16; Rebs: Silađi 7 Asts: Petković 3

Siemens Arena, Vilnius
Attendance: 150
Referees: Ivo Dolinek, Andrej Lovšin, Jurgis Laurinavicius

July 28
16:45

Report

Croatia	82–77	Turkey
Scoring by quarter: 16–18, 25–13, 16–20, 25–26
Pts: Katić 21; Rebs: Katić 8 Asts: Katić 7		Pts: Baygül 19; Rebs: Geyik, Senli 6 Asts: Edge 6

Lietuvos Rytas Arena, Vilnius
Attendance: 50
Referees: Ivo Dolinek, Andrej Lovšin, Carlos Mateus

July 28
19:00

Report

Serbia	97–52	Italy
Scoring by quarter: 26–18, 21–14, 21–10, 29–10
Pts: Silađi 15; Rebs: Silađi 11; Asts: Bogdanović 5		Pts: Ceron 14; Rebs: Pini, Chillo 4 Asts: Gentile 4

Lietuvos Rytas Arena, Vilnius
Attendance: 100
Referees: Tomas Jasevicius, Omer Esteron, Sergiy Zashchuk

July 28
21:15

Report

Russia	69–52	Greece
Scoring by quarter: 23–12, 15–4, 21–24, 10–12
Pts: Trushkin 14; Rebs: Trushkin 10; Asts: Varnakov 5		Pts: Psaropoulos 18; Rebs: Chrysikopoulos, Antonakis 5 Asts: Mavrogiannis 3

Lietuvos Rytas Arena, Vilnius
Attendance: 100
Referees: Romualdas Brazauskas, Olegs Latisevs, Gentian Cici

=== Classification round ===
The last teams of each group in the preliminary round competed in this Classification round. The four teams played in one group. The last two teams were relegated to Division B for the next season.

Team is relegated to Division B.

==== Group G ====
Team	Pld	W	L	PF	PA	PD	Pts	Tiebreaker
Germany	6	5	1	420	373	+47	11	
Ukraine	6	4	2	471	424	+47	10	
Sweden	6	2	4	427	445	−18	8	
Bulgaria	6	1	5	402	478	−76	7	

July 26
14:30

Report

Sweden	88–66	Bulgaria
Scoring by quarter: 19–22, 16–10, 32–14, 21–20
Pts: Eriksson 20; Rebs: Viktor Gaddefors, Desport 8 Asts: Barton 8		Pts: Dafinov, Gospodinov 2 Rebs: Gospodinov 11; Asts: Dimitrov 4

Lietuvos Rytas Arena, Vilnius
Attendance: 50
Referees: Andrej Lovšin, Ersan Kartal, Rafael Ganiev

July 26
14:30

Report

Ukraine	59–73	Germany
Scoring by quarter: 10–18, 8–21, 20–17, 21–17
Pts: Len 20; Rebs: Len 17; Asts: Mishula 2		Pts: Neumann 24; Rebs: Heckmann, Neumann 8 Asts: Wendt 5

Siemens Arena, Vilnius
Attendance: 100
Referees: Tomas Jasevicius, Peter Bodnar, Gintaras Vitkauskas

July 27
14:30

Report

Bulgaria	75–79	Ukraine
Scoring by quarter: 22–22, 15–20, 18–14, 20–23
Pts: Ivanov 21; Rebs: Dimitrov 8 Asts: Dafinov, Ivanov 5		Pts: Len 26; Rebs: Len 18; Asts: Prokopenko 5

Siemens Arena, Vilnius
Referees: Milan Mažić, Carlos Mateus, Rafael Ganiev

July 27
14:30

Report

Germany	73–66	Sweden
Scoring by quarter: 22–13, 9–15, 29–11, 13–27
Pts: Wendt 18; Rebs: Neumann, Wendt 8 Asts: Bright, Wendt 3		Pts: Eriksson 15; Rebs: Hussein 9 Asts: Barton 4

Lietuvos Rytas Arena, Vilnius
Attendance: 100

July 28
14:30

Report

Ukraine	76–81	Sweden
Scoring by quarter: 22–9, 17–16, 19–30, 18–26
Pts: Artamonov 22; Rebs: Len 13; Asts: Artamonov 7		Pts: Eriksson 17; Rebs: Hussein 11; Asts: Person 9

Siemens Arena, Vilnius
Attendance: 200
Referees: Jurgis Laurinavicius, Peter Bodnar, Ersan Kartal

July 28
14:30

Report

Bulgaria	58–65	Germany
Scoring by quarter: 14–16, 14–17, 17–13, 13–19
Pts: Dimitrov 17; Rebs: Gospodinov, Tenchev 8 Asts: Dafinov, Dimitrov 3		Pts: Breunig 15; Rebs: Breunig 9 Asts: Wendt 6

Lietuvos Rytas Arena, Vilnius
Attendance: 50
Referees: Tomasz Trawicki, Martynas Gudas, Rafael Ganiev

July 30
14:30

Report

Germany	59–74	Ukraine
Scoring by quarter: 15–15, 18–20, 7–18, 19–21
Pts: Neumann 17; Rebs: Neumann 11; Asts: three players 2		Pts: Artamonov 25; Rebs: Marchenko, Bobrov 8 Asts: Artamonov, Bobrov 5

Lietuvos Rytas Arena, Vilnius
Attendance: 100
Referees: Andrej Lovšin, Ioannis Foufis, Martynas Gudas

July 30
16:15

Report

Bulgaria	73–70	Sweden
Scoring by quarter: 15–12, 16–20, 21–16, 21–22
Pts: Dimitrov 20; Rebs: Gospodinov 10; Asts: Dafinov 9		Pts: Eriksson 21; Rebs: Hussein 12; Asts: Person, Hussein 5

Lietuvos Rytas Arena, Vilnius
Attendance: 50
Referees: Tomas Jasevicius, Carlos Mateus, Xavier Castro Cartagena

July 31
14:30

Report

Sweden	49–78	Germany
Scoring by quarter: 11–22, 11–24, 12–14, 15–18
Pts: Viktor Gaddefors 10; Rebs: Nguyen 7 Asts: Nguyen 7		Pts: Mönninghoff, Neumann 15; Rebs: Neumann, Kramer 11; Asts: Wendt 5

Lietuvos Rytas Arena, Vilnius
Attendance: 70
Referees: Tomasz Trawicki, Ersan Kartal, Carlos Mateus

July 31
16:15

Report

Ukraine	104–63	Bulgaria
Scoring by quarter: 32–19, 29–25, 15–15, 28–4
Pts: Bobrov 19; Rebs: Krutous 9 Asts: Artamonov 9		Pts: Gospodinov 18; Rebs: Gospodinov 6 Asts: Ivanov 5

Lietuvos Rytas Arena, Vilnius
Attendance: 50
Referees: Jurgis Laurinavicius, Peter Bodnar, Rafael Ganiev

August 1
14:30

Report

Sweden	73–79	Ukraine
Scoring by quarter: 21–16, 13–21, 17–16, 22–26
Pts: Person 24; Rebs: Norman, Hussein 9 Asts: Hussein 5		Pts: Len 24; Rebs: Len 20; Asts: Artamonov 8

Lietuvos Rytas Arena, Vilnius
Attendance: 200

August 1
16:15

Report

Germany	72–67	Bulgaria
Scoring by quarter: 15–26, 19–16, 11–16, 27–9
Pts: Heckmann 13; Rebs: Neumann 11; Asts: Heckmann 7		Pts: Tenchev 23; Rebs: Ivanov 6 Asts: Dafinov 7

Lietuvos Rytas Arena, Vilnius
Attendance: 50

== Knockout round ==
=== Championship ===
External videos
- U-18 Final Vilnius (Part 1)
- U-18 Final Vilnius (Part 2)
- U-18 Final Vilnius (Part 3)
- U-18 Final Vilnius (Part 4)
- U-18 Final Vilnius (Part 5)
- U-18 Final Vilnius (Part 6)
- U-18 Final Vilnius (Part 7)

Quarter-finals
July 30 – Vilnius
Lithuania	84
Greece	51
July 30 – Vilnius
Serbia	75
Poland	57
July 30 – Vilnius
Latvia	78
Croatia	56
July 30 – Vilnius
Russia	73
France	68

Semi-finals
July 31 – Vilnius
Lithuania	67
Serbia	66
July 31 – Vilnius
Latvia	42
Russia	73

Final
August 1 – Vilnius
Lithuania	90
Russia	61
Third place
August 1 – Vilnius
Serbia	49
Latvia	75

==== Quarterfinals ====
July 30
14:30

Report

Russia	73–68 (OT)	France
Scoring by quarter: 12–12, 14–18, 12–12, 21–17, Overtime: 14–9
Pts: Trushkin 22; Rebs: Trushkin 9 Asts: Varnakov 11		Pts: Invernizzi 20; Rebs: Gobert 16; Asts: Keita 6

Siemens Arena, Vilnius
Referees: Robert Lottermoser, Omer Esteron, Jurgis Laurinavicius

July 30
16:45

Report

Latvia	78–56	Croatia
Scoring by quarter: 23–17, 24–15, 13–9, 18–15
Pts: Bertans 17; Rebs: Dukulis, Bertans 10; Asts: Bertans 4		Pts: Barać 15; Rebs: Barać 10; Asts: Katić 3

Siemens Arena, Vilnius
Attendance: 700
Referees: Romualdas Brazauskas, Tomasz Trawicki, Ersan Kartal

July 30
19:00

Report

Lithuania	84–51	Greece
Scoring by quarter: 19–16, 23–10, 25–16, 17–9
Pts: Redikas 19; Rebs: Valančiūnas 17; Asts: Cizauskas 9		Pts: Chrysikopoulos 21; Rebs: Chrysikopoulos, Antonakis 8 Asts: Psaropoulos 3

Siemens Arena, Vilnius
Attendance: 4,500
Referees: Zoran Šutulović, Siniša Herceg, Sergiy Zashchuk

July 30
21:15

Report

Serbia	75–57	Poland
Scoring by quarter: 22–18, 16–17, 19–12, 18–10
Pts: Bogdanović 14; Rebs: Silađi 10; Asts: Vujošević 3		Pts: Ponitka 20; Rebs: Karnowski, Gielo 7 Asts: Kwiatkowski 3

Siemens Arena, Vilnius
Referees: Luigi Lamonica, Olegs Latisevs, Gentian Cici

==== Semifinals ====
July 31
19:00

Report

Lithuania	67–66	Serbia
Scoring by quarter: 22–14, 12–23, 17–19, 16–10
Pts: Čižauskas 15; Rebs: Valančiūnas 14; Asts: Simanavicius 2		Pts: Vujošević 15; Rebs: Bogdanović 7 Asts: Vujošević 4

Siemens Arena, Vilnius
Attendance: 4,800
Referees: Zoran Šutulović, Omer Esteron, Sergiy Zashchuk

July 31
21:15

Report

Latvia	42–73	Russia
Scoring by quarter: 11–11, 12–17, 10–19, 9–26
Pts: Bertans 12; Rebs: Dukulis, Bertans 8 Asts: Vecvagars 5		Pts: Karasev 16; Rebs: Loginov 14; Asts: Varnakov 7

Siemens Arena, Vilnius
Attendance: 1,000
Referees: Luigi Lamonica, Andrej Lovšin, Ioannis Foufis

==== Bronze-medal game ====
August 1
19:00

Report

Serbia	49–75	Latvia
Scoring by quarter: 16–14, 12–16, 15–25, 6–20
Pts: Bogdanović 12; Rebs: Gujaničić, Bogdanović 6 Asts: Vujošević 3		Pts: Bertans 24; Rebs: Dukulis 10; Asts: Misters 6

Siemens Arena, Vilnius
Attendance: 9,000

==== Final ====
August 1
21:15

Report

Lithuania	90–61	Russia
Scoring by quarter: 28–9, 18–22, 17–12, 27–18
Pts: Valančiūnas 31; Rebs: Valančiūnas 18; Asts: Cizauskas 6		Pts: Karasev 15; Rebs: Varnakov 6 Asts: Kulagin 4

Siemens Arena, Vilnius
Attendance: 12,000
Referees: Luigi Lamonica, Robert Lottermoser, Olegs Latisevs

=== 5th–8th playoffs ===
Semi-finals
July 31 – Vilnius
Greece	55
Poland	74
July 31 – Vilnius
Croatia	67
France	61

Fifth place
August 1 – Vilnius
Croatia	92
Poland	77
Seventh place
August 1 – Vilnius
France	77
Greece	75

==== 5th–8th semifinals ====
July 31
14:30

Report

Greece	55–74	Poland
Scoring by quarter: 13–16, 14–23, 13–16, 15–19
Pts: Antonakis 13; Rebs: Chrysikopoulos 9 Asts: three players 3		Pts: Ponitka 24; Rebs: Sokołówski 6 Asts: Sokołówski 6

Siemens Arena, Vilnius
Attendance: 100
Referees: Robert Lottermoser, Tomas Jasevicius, Xavier Castro Cartagena

July 31
16:45

Report

Croatia	67–61	France
Scoring by quarter: 13–17, 15–21, 21–10, 18–13
Pts: Šarić 18; Rebs: Šarić 8 Asts: Šarić 5		Pts: Ceci 19; Rebs: Gobert 8 Asts: three players 2

Siemens Arena, Vilnius
Referees: Romualdas Brazauskas, Milan Mažić, Gentian Cici

==== 7th place playoff ====
August 1
14:30

Report

Greece	75–77	France
Scoring by quarter: 17–15, 19–28, 23–15, 16–19
Pts: Chrysikopoulos 26; Rebs: Chrysikopoulos, Kampouris 5 Asts: Antonakis 6		Pts: Invernizzi 17; Rebs: Gobert 12; Asts: Invernizzi 3

Siemens Arena, Vilnius
Attendance: 200

==== 5th place playoff ====
August 1
16:45

Report

Poland	77–92	Croatia
Scoring by quarter: 21–25, 19–34, 18–12, 19–21
Pts: Gielo 14; Rebs: Sokołówski 8 Asts: Kwiatkowski, Grochowski 4		Pts: Katić 20; Rebs: Šarić 9 Asts: Katić 6

Siemens Arena, Vilnius
Attendance: 600

=== 9th–12th playoffs ===
Semi-finals
July 30 – Vilnius
Spain	60
Turkey	66
July 30 – Vilnius
Italy	91
Slovenia	96

Ninth place
July 31 – Vilnius
Turkey	74
Slovenia	71
Eleventh place
July 31 – Vilnius
Spain	84
Italy	59

==== 9th–12th semifinals ====
July 30
19:00

Report

Spain	60–66	Turkey
Scoring by quarter: 11–16, 17–21, 13–16, 19–13
Pts: Barrera 14; Rebs: Oriola 6 Asts: three players 2		Pts: Edge 17; Rebs: Yildizli 7 Asts: Baygül 4

Lietuvos Rytas Arena, Vilnius
Attendance: 50
Referees: Milan Mažić(SRB), Athanasios Ikonomou(SWE), Vladimir Tsekov

July 30
21:15

Report

Italy	91–96 (OT)	Slovenia
Scoring by quarter: 19–21, 15–16, 20–21, 22–18, Overtime: 15–20
Pts: Ceron 4 Rebs: Pini, Sgobba 6 Asts: Ceron 4		Pts: Pajić 20; Rebs: Pajić 20; Asts: Rupnik 5

Lietuvos Rytas Arena, Vilnius
Attendance: 50
Referees: Ivo Dolinek, Peter Bodnar, Rafael Ganiev

==== 11th place playoff ====
July 31
19:00

Report

Spain	84–59	Italy
Scoring by quarter: 19–17, 22–13, 24–12, 19–17
Pts: Oriola 9 Rebs: Oriola 7 Asts: Ventura, Fernández 6		Pts: Montano 13; Rebs: Sgobba 8 Asts: Sgobba 3

Lietuvos Rytas Arena, Vilnius
Attendance: 50
Referees: Siniša Herceg, Vladimir Tsekov, Martynas Gudas

==== 9th place playoff ====
July 31
21:15

Report

Turkey	74–71	Slovenia
Scoring by quarter: 10–27, 21–20, 20–10, 23–14
Pts: Edge 20; Rebs: Tekin 7 Asts: Edge 5		Pts: Omić 17; Rebs: Pajić, Omić 11; Asts: Rupnik 5

Lietuvos Rytas Arena, Vilnius
Attendance: 30
Referees: Olegs Latisevs, Gentian Cici, Athanasios Ikonomou

== Final standings ==
Rank	Team	Record
1st place, gold medalist(s)	Lithuania	9–0
2nd place, silver medalist(s)	Russia	7–2
3rd place, bronze medalist(s)	Latvia	6–3
4th	Serbia	5–4
5th	Croatia	6–3
6th	Poland	4–5
7th	France	4–5
8th	Greece	4–5
9th	Turkey	4–4
10th	Slovenia	3–5
11th	Spain	4–4
12th	Italy	2–6
13th	Germany	5–4
14th	Ukraine	4–5
15th	Sweden	2–7
16th	Bulgaria	1–8

== Awards ==
U18 European Championship Men 2010 Division A winner

Lithuania
Second title

Most Valuable Player
(Lithuania) Jonas Valančiūnas

All-Tournament Team

- (Russia) Dmitry Kulagin
- (Lithuania) Deividas Pukis
- (Latvia) Davis Bertans
- (Serbia) Nikola Silađi
- (Lithuania) Jonas Valančiūnas

Fair Play Award

- (Croatia) Marijo Pervan (Croatian Physio)

== Statistical leaders ==
Points

Name	PPG
(Italy) Alessandro Gentile	23.0
(Lithuania) Jonas Valančiūnas	19.4
(Greece) Linos Chrysikopoulos	17.0
(Ukraine) Olexiy Len	16.0
(Lithuania) Deividas Pukis	15.8

Rebounds

Name	RPG
(Lithuania) Jonas Valančiūnas	13.4
(Ukraine) Olexiy Len	11.4
(Slovenia) Marko Pajić	10.0
(France) Rudy Gobert	9.0
(Bulgaria) Hristo Gospodinov	9.0

Assists

Name	APG
(Russia) Alexander Varnakov	5.6
(Lithuania) Vytenis Cizauskas	5.6
(Ukraine) Klym Artamonov	5.1
(Russia) Dmitry Kulagin	4.3
(Sweden) Jonathan Person	4.3

Blocks

Name	BPG
(Ukraine) Olexiy Len	4.3
(Lithuania) Jonas Valančiūnas	2.7
(Greece) Linos Chrysikopoulos	2.7
(France) Rudy Gobert	1.7
(Latvia) Davis Bertans	1.6

Steals

Name	SPG
(Russia) Dmitry Kulagin	2.9
(Russia) Alexander Varnakov	2.4
(Russia) Vladislav Trushkin	2.1
(Ukraine) Dmytro Marchenko	2.0
(Slovenia) Luka Rupnik	2.0
