= Lykogiannis =

Lykogiannis is a Greek surname. Notable people with this surname include:

- Aris Lykogiannis (born 1969), Greek professional basketball coach
- Charalampos Lykogiannis (born 1993), Greek professional footballer, also known as Lykos
