= Nikos Paparegkas =

Greek basketball player (born 1994)

Personal information
- Born: 31 July 1994 (age 32) Thessaloniki, Greece
- Listed height: 6 ft 6.7 in (2.00 m)
- Listed weight: 91 kg (201 lb)

Career information
- Playing career: 2013–present
- Position: Small forward / shooting guard

Career history
- 2013–2015: Kavala
- 2015–2016: Panionios
- 2016–2017: Charilaos Trikoupis Mesologgi
- 2017–2018: Filathlitikos Zografou
- 2018–2019: Proteas Voula
- 2019–2020: Triton Athina
- 2020–2021: Karditsa
- 2021–2022: Koroivos Amaliada
- 2022–2023: Iraklis Thessaloniki
- 2023: Megaris
- 2023–2025: Iraklis Thessaloniki

Career highlights
- Greek Elite League champion (2015)

Nikos Paparegkas (Greek: Νίκος Παπαρέγκας; born July 31, 1994) is a Greek professional basketball player. He is a 2.00 metres (6 feet 7 inches) tall swingman.

== Professional career ==
After playing in the youth leagues with Aristotelis Epanomis and Mantoulidis, Paparegkas started his pro career with Kavala.

From 2015 until 2013, Paparegkas played with Panionios, Charilaos Trikoupis, Filathlitikos, Proteas Voulas, Triton Sepolia, Karditsa, Koroivos Amaliadas, Iraklis Thessaloniki and Megarida.

On 2023, he returned to Iraklis, where he became the captain of the club.
