= Nikos Gkikas =

Greek basketball player (born 1990)

Nikos Gkikas Νίκος Γκίκας
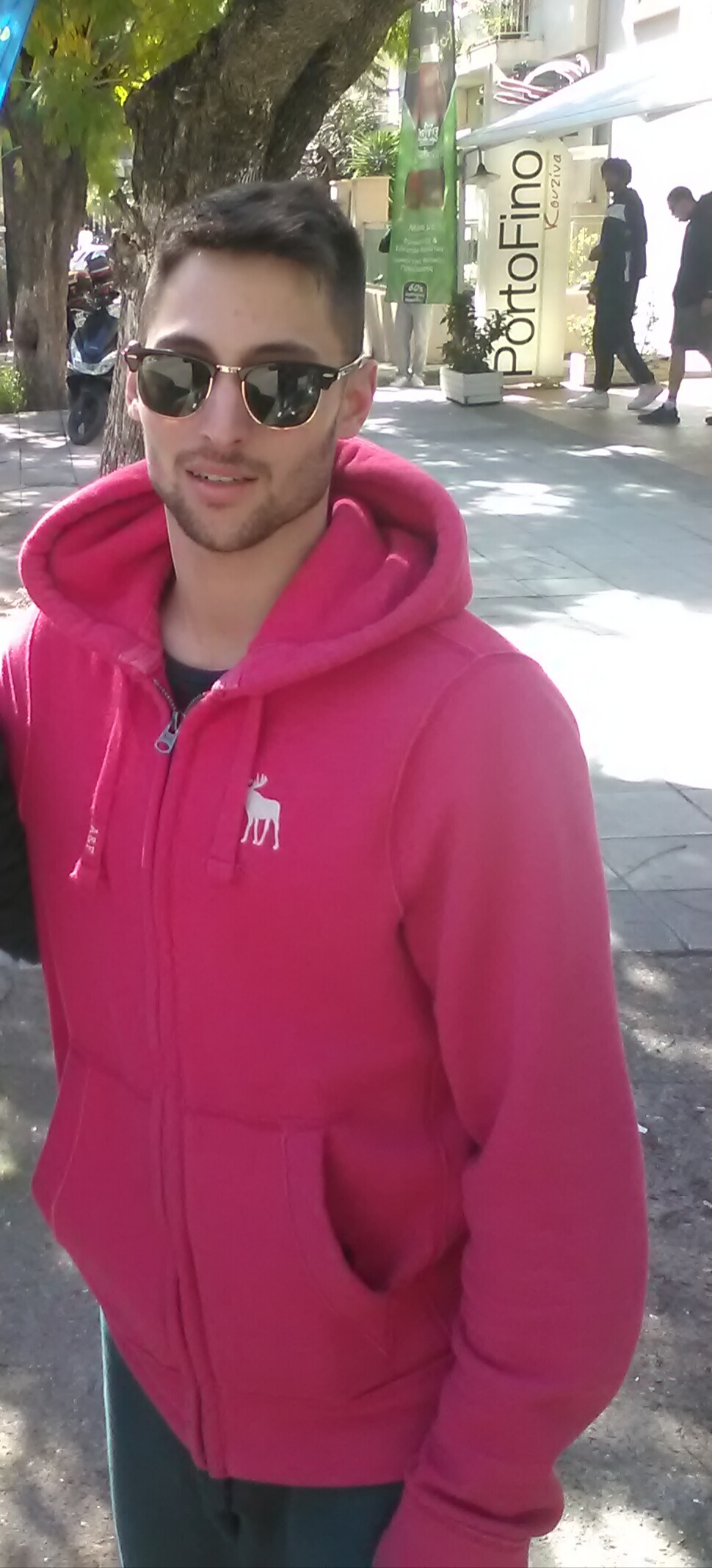
- Gkikas in 2017

ASK Karditsas
- Position: Point guard
- League: Greek Basketball League

Personal information
- Born: November 22, 1990 (age 35) Athens, Greece
- Listed height: 1.86 m (6 ft 1 in)
- Listed weight: 81 kg (179 lb)

Career information
- NBA draft: 2012: undrafted
- Playing career: 2012–present

Career history
- 2012–2013: Filathlitikos
- 2013–2015: Aris
- 2015: Ventspils
- 2015–2016: Nea Kifissia
- 2016–2019: Promitheas Patras
- 2019–2021: AEK Athens
- 2021–2023: Promitheas Patras
- 2023–2026: Panionios
- 2026–present: Karditsa

Career highlights
- Greek Cup winner (2020); 2× Greek League All Star (2018, 2022); Baltic League assists leader (2015); All-Greek A2 Elite League Team (2024); 2x Greek A2 Elite League assists leader (2013, 2024)

Nikolaos Gkikas (alternate spelling: Gikas) (Greek: Νικόλαος "Νίκος" Γκίκας; born November 22, 1990) is a Greek professional basketball player for Karditsa of the Greek Basketball League (GBL). He is a 1.86 m (6'1 1/4") tall point guard.

== Professional career ==
After playing basketball at the Greek amateur and minor league levels with Filathlitikos, from 2008 to 2012, Gkikas started his pro career in 2012, with Filathlitikos in the Greek 2nd Division. During the seasons that Gkikas played at Filathlitikos, he played with players such as Giannis Antetokounmpo, Thanasis Antetokounmpo, Michalis Kamperidis, and Christos Saloustros, during the club's peak years. During the 2012–13 season, Gkikas almost gained a league promotion with Filathlitikos, but at the end of the season, the club finished in 3rd place in the Greek 2nd Division, just missing the league promotion to the Greek 1st Division.

Gkikas moved to the Greek 1st Division club Aris, in 2013. During the two years he played at Aris, his numbers dropped, due to the limited playing time he had with the club. On 15 January 2015, after leaving Aris, Gkikas signed with the Baltic League club Ventspils. With Ventspils, he led the 2014–15 Baltic Baltic League in assists per game, and was one of the key players of the team.

He spent the 2015–16 season with the Greek club Nea Kifissia. On July 17, 2016, Gkikas signed a two-year deal with the Greek club Promitheas Patras. On June 19, 2017, after being one of the best players of Promitheas in the 2016–17 season, he renewed his contract with the club for two more years. He then became the team captain.

On July 4, 2019, Gkikas signed a three-year contract with AEK Athens. In the 2020–2021 season, Gkikas averaged 6.9 points, 1.7 rebounds, and 2.5 assists, playing 17.4 minutes per contest.

On August 6, 2021, Gkikas signed back with his former team Promitheas Patras. In 22 league games, he averaged 7.2 points, 2.5 rebounds, 5.9 assists and 1.7 steals, playing around 24 minutes per contest. On June 21, 2022, playing against Larisa for the Greek Basket League playoffs, Gkikas achieved a career-high of 20 points and 13 assists.

On June 28, 2022, Gkikas renewed his contract for another season. In 25 domestic league matches, he averaged 4.8 points, 2.6 rebounds and 2.7 assists, playing around 19 minutes per contest.

On June 30, 2023, Gkikas signed with Panionios in order to lead the club in its return to the professional divisions. Since then, he remains as the teams captain.

== National team career ==
Gkikas became a member of the senior men's Greek national basketball team in 2017. He played at the 2019 FIBA European World Cup qualification.

== Career statistics ==
=== Domestic Leagues ===
==== Regular season ====
Legend
GP	Games played	MPG	Minutes per game	FG%	Field goal percentage
3P%	3-point field goal percentage	FT%	Free throw percentage	RPG	Rebounds per game
APG	Assists per game	SPG	Steals per game	BPG	Blocks per game
PPG	Points per game	**Bold**	Career high		Led the league

Note: Only games in the primary domestic competitions are included. Therefore, games in cup or European competitions are left out.

Year	Team	League	GP	MPG	FG%	3P%	FT%	RPG	APG	SPG	BPG	PPG
2017–18	Promitheas	GBL	26	25.4	.377	.317	.768	2.5	6.2	1.3	0	9.4
2018–19	Promitheas	GBL	25	18.5	.286	.226	.808	2.0	3.8	.9	0	5.1

=== FIBA Champions League ===
Year	Team	GP	MPG	FG%	3P%	FT%	RPG	APG	SPG	BPG	PPG
2018–19	Promitheas	15	23.0	.386	.351	.857	2.5	4.8	1.7	0	8.9
