= Deividas Pukis =

Lithuanian basketball player (born 1992)

Personal information
- Born: 10 January 1992 (age 34) Šilutė, Lithuania
- Listed height: 6 ft 4.5 in (1.94 m)

Career information
- High school: Christian Life Center Academy (Humble, Texas)
- Playing career: 2011–2015
- Position: Shooting guard

Career history
- 2011–2012: BC Sakalai
- 2012–2013: CB Peñas Huesca
- 2013–2015: BC Šilutė
- 2015: BC Prienai

Career highlights
- FIBA Europe U-18 All-Tournament Team (2010)
Medals
Men's basketball
Representing Lithuania
FIBA Europe Under-20 Championship
Gold medal – first place	2012 Slovenia	U-20 Team
FIBA World Under-19 Championship
Gold medal – first place	2011 Latvia	U-19 Team
FIBA Europe Under-18 Championship
Gold medal – first place	2010 Lithuania	U-18 Team
FIBA Europe Under-16 Championship
Gold medal – first place	2008 Italy	U-16 Team

Deividas Pukis (born 10 January 1992, Kaunas, Lithuania) is a Lithuanian professional basketball player whose position is shooting guard. In 2010 he suffered a serious knee injury, which kept him from basketball court for more than a half year.

== International career ==
He won four gold medals with Lithuania national teams: Europe U-16 in 2008, Europe U-18 in 2010, World U-19 in 2011 and Europe U-20 in 2012. He also was a part of U-18 all-tournament team in 2008.
