= Igor Milošević =

Greek-Serbian basketball player

Personal information
- Born: April 14, 1986 (age 40) Belgrade, SR Serbia, SFR Yugoslavia
- Listed height: 6 ft 4 in (1.93 m)
- Listed weight: 205 lb (93 kg)

Career information
- NBA draft: 2008: undrafted
- Playing career: 2003–2018
- Position: Point guard / shooting guard

Career history
- 2003–2005: Iraklis Thessaloniki
- 2005–2008: Crvena zvezda
- 2008–2009: Olympiacos
- 2009–2010: Maroussi
- 2010: Lietuvos Rytas
- 2011: Trabzonspor
- 2011–2012: Astana
- 2012: Phantoms Braunschweig
- 2013–2014: Kavala
- 2014: AEK Larnaca
- 2014–2016: Kymis
- 2016–2017: Holargos
- 2017–2018: Peristeri

Career highlights
- Lithuanian League champion (2010); Lithuanian Cup winner (2010); Serbian Cup winner (2006); Kazakhstan Cup winner (2012); 2× Greek 2nd Division champion (2016, 2018)
Medals
Men's basketball
Representing Greece
Mediterranean Games
Silver medal – second place	2009 Pescara	Under-26

Igor Milošević (Serbian Cyrillic: Игор Милошевић; born April 14, 1986) is a former Greek professional basketball player of Serbian origin. In Greece, he is known as Igkor Milosevits (Greek: Ιγκόρ Μιλόσεβιτς). At a height of 1.93 (6'4") tall, he played at both the point guard and shooting guard positions.

== Professional career ==
Milošević began his professional career in 2003, with the Greek League club Iraklis Thessaloniki. After spending three years with Iraklis, he moved to the Adriatic League club Crvena zvezda, in 2005. After spending three seasons with Crvena zvezda, he moved to the EuroLeague club, Olympiacos Piraeus, in 2008.

In 2009, he moved to the Greek club Maroussi, and in 2010, he joined the Lithuanian League club Lietuvos Rytas In January 2011, he joined the Turkish League club Trabzonspor. In September 2011, he signed a one-year deal with Astana of VTB United League.

In February 2012, he signed with Phantoms Braunschweig of the German League, on a contract through the end of the 2011–12 season. In 2013, he moved to the Greek club Kavala.

On October 9, 2014, Milošević joined the Greek club Kymis, and stayed with them for two seasons. In the 2016–17 season he played with the Greek club Holargos. In July 2017, he signed with the Greek club Peristeri.

== National team career ==
Milošević was a member of the junior Greek national basketball teams. He played at the 2004 FIBA Europe Under-18 Championship, the 2005 FIBA Europe Under-20 Championship, and the 2006 FIBA Europe Under-20 Championship. He also won the silver medal at the 2009 Mediterranean Games, with Greece's under-26 national team.

== Awards and accomplishments ==
=== Pro career ===
- Serbian Cup Winner: (2006)
- Lithuanian Cup Winner: (2010)
- Lithuanian League Champion: (2010)
- Kazakh Cup Winner: (2012)
- 2× Greek 2nd Division Champion: (2016, 2018)

=== Greek national team ===
- 2009 Mediterranean Games: Silver
