= Sotiris Billis =

Greek basketball player

Sotiris Billis Σωτήρης Μπίλλης
No. 12 – Mykonos
- Position: Small forward / power forward
- League: Greek Basketball League

Personal information
- Born: November 14, 1996 (age 30) Athens, Greece
- Listed height: 6 ft 6 in (1.98 m)
- Listed weight: 201 lb (91 kg)

Career information
- Playing career: 2014–present

Career history
- 2014–2015: Panionios
- 2015–2016: Kolossos Rodou
- 2016–2017: Panionios
- 2017–2019: Kolossos Rodou
- 2019–2020: Karditsa
- 2020–2025: Kolossos Rodou
- 2025–present: Mykonos

Sotiris Billis (Greek: Σωτήρης Μπίλλης; born November 14, 1996) is a Greek professional basketball player for Mykonos of the Greek Basketball League. He is a 1.98 m (6 ft. 6in.) tall forward.

== Youth career ==
Billis played from a young age with the youth teams of Panionios, before he started his pro career.

== Professional career ==
Billis signed his first professional contract with the Greek Basket League club Panionios, on 2014. After playing one season with Kolossos Rodou, he returned to Panionios for a second spell on July 28, 2016. He rejoined Kolossos the following year, where he stayed for two seasons.

During the 2019–2020 campaign, Billis played with Karditsa of the Greek 2nd division.

In 2020, Billis returned to Kolossos Rodou for the third time. On July 2, 2021, he renewed his contract with the island team for another year. In 16 games, he averaged 2.1 points and 1.2 rebounds in 7 minutes per contest. On August 2, 2022, he re-signed for another season, his sixth overall with the club, and was named vice-captain in the process. In 9 games, he averaged 1.7 points and 2.1 rebounds in 10 minutes per contest. On August 1, 2023, Billis penned a new contract with Kolossos. He averaged 5 points per game, shooting 45 percent from thee point line. On July 24, 2024, he renewed his contract for one more season with the club.

After 5 years with Kolossos, Billis joined the newly promoted Mykonos of the Greek Basketball League.
