= Tom Lidén =

Swedish basketball player

Free agent
- Position: Power forward / small forward

Personal information
- Born: July 11, 1987 (age 39) Södertälje, Sweden
- Listed height: 2.03 m (6 ft 8 in)
- Listed weight: 110 kg (243 lb)

Career information
- NBA draft: 2009: undrafted
- Playing career: 2006–2018

Career history
- 2006–2011: Södertälje Kings
- 2011–2014: Sundsvall Dragons
- 2014–2016: Kolossos Rodou
- 2016–2018: Luleå
- 2019: Τälje Κnights

Career highlights
- Swedish League champion (2017)

Tom Lidén (born July 11, 1987) is a Swedish former professional basketball player.

== Professional career ==
Liden signed with Kolossos Rodou in 2014.
