= Georgios Kamperidis =

Greek basketball player (born 1999)

No. 21 – Kolossos H Hotels
- Position: Small forward / shooting guard
- League: Greek Basketball League

Personal information
- Born: October 1, 1999 (age 27) Greece
- Listed height: 6 ft 7 in (2.01 m)
- Listed weight: 210 lb (95 kg)

Career information
- NBA draft: 2021: undrafted
- Playing career: 2017–present

Career history
- 2017–2020: Panionios
- 2020–2023: PAOK Thessaloniki
- 2023–2024: Karditsa
- 2024: Neptūnas Klaipėda
- 2024–2026: Karditsa
- 2026–present: Kolossos Rodou

Georgios "George" Kamperidis (alternate spelling: Giorgos, Kaberidis) (Greek: Γιωργος Καμπεριδης; born October 1, 1999) is a Greek professional basketball player for Kolossos Rodou of the Greek Basketball League. He is 2.01 m (6 ft 7 in) tall, and he plays at the shooting guard and small forward positions.

== Professional career ==
After playing basketball with the youth clubs of Mandraikos and Doukas, Kamperidis began his pro career in the Greek Basket League, with Panionios, starting with the 2017–18 season. During the 2019–20 season, he averaged 4.2 points and 1.6 rebounds per game.

On August 3, 2020, Kamperidis moved to Thessaloniki and signed with PAOK. On April 23, 2021, Kamperidis signed a contract extension for another two seasons. During the 2021–22 campaign, in a total of 20 games, he averaged 3.2 points, 1.2 rebounds and 0.5 steals, playing around 10 minutes per contest. During the 2022–23 campaign, in 29 league games, he averaged 2.4 points and 1.3 rebounds, playing around 9 minutes per contest.

On July 13, 2023, Kamperidis signed with Karditsa.

On April 18, 2024, Kamperidis signed with Neptūnas Klaipėda of the Lithuanian Basketball League (LKL) for the remainder of the season.

On June 19, 2024, Kamperidis signed with Karditsa of the Greek Basket League (GBL).

On June 3,2026, he moved to Kolossos Rodou.

== National team career ==
Kamperidis has been a member of the Greek junior national teams. With Greece's youth national teams, he played at the 2017 FIBA U18 European Championship, the 2018 FIBA U20 European Championship, and at the 2019 FIBA U20 European Championship.

== Personal life ==
Kamperidis' older brother, Michalis, is also a professional basketball player.
