= Vassilis Fragkias =

Greek basketball player and coach

APOEL
- Position: Head coach
- League: Cypriot League

Personal information
- Born: 24 August 1961 (age 65) Athens, Greece

Career information
- Playing career: 1979–1985
- Coaching career: 1986–present

Career history

Playing
- 1979–1985: Zografou

Coaching
- 1986–1990: Ilysiakos (Juniors)
- 1991–1992: Pagrati (Assistant)
- 1992–1993: Peristeri
- 1993–1994: Sporting
- 1994–1995: Ilysiakos
- 1995–1996: Arion Athens
- 1996–1997: VAO Thessaloniki
- 1997–1998: Olympia Larissa
- 1998–1999: Arion Athens
- 1999–2002: AEL Limassol
- 2002–2003: Dafni
- 2003–2006: Kolossos Rhodes
- 2006–2009: Keravnos Nicosia
- 2009–2010: Pagrati
- 2010–2011: Ilysiakos
- 2011–2012: Kolossos Rhodes
- 2012: Dnipro-Azot
- 2012–2013: Kolossos Rhodes
- 2014–2017: Qatar
- 2018–2019: Panionios
- 2019: Larisa
- 2020–2021: APOEL
- 2022–2024: Erdenet Miners
- 2023–present: Mongolia

Career highlights
- As head coach: Mongolian National League Champion (2023); Mongolian National League Coach of the Year (2023); Cypriot League champion (2008); Cypriot Cup winner (2007); Cypriot League Coach of the Year (2008); Greek 2nd Division champion (2005); Greek 4th Division champion (1996)

Vassilis Fragkias (alternative spellings: Vasilis, Fragias; born 24 August 1961) is a Greek former basketball player and professional basketball coach.

== Playing career ==
Fragkias played club basketball with the Greek club Zografou.

== Coaching career ==
During his coaching career, Fragkias has been the head coach of numerous professional teams in Greece, Cyprus, and Ukraine.

In 2014, Fragkias became the head coach of the senior Qatari national basketball team. He led Qatar to the quarterfinals of the 2015 FIBA Asia Championship.
