= Holargos B.C. =

Basketball team based in Cholargos, Athens, Greece

Holargos
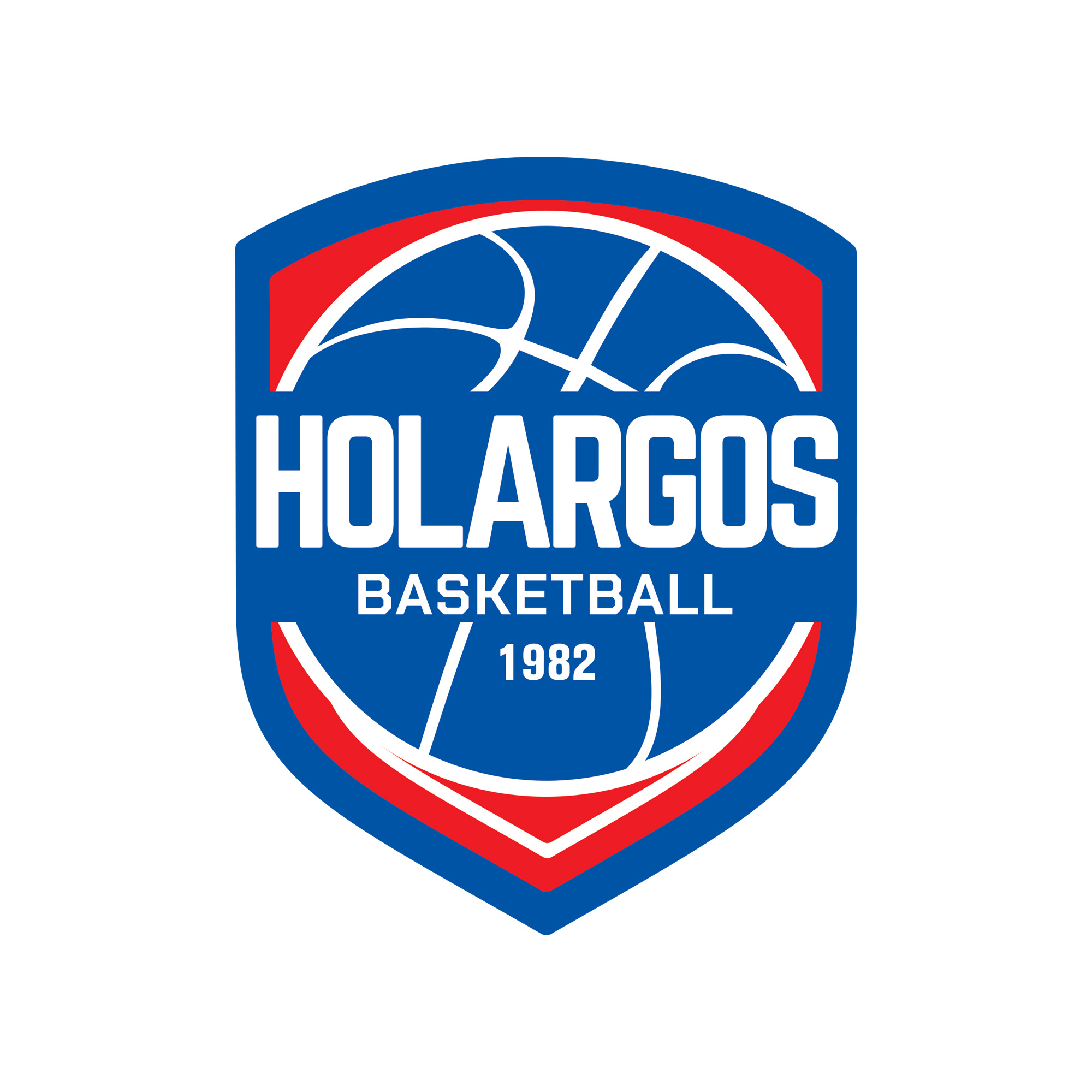
- Leagues: National League 1
- Founded: 1982; 44 years ago
- History: O.F. Holargos (1982–1990); Holargos BC (1982–present)
- Arena: Antonis Tritsis Indoor Hall
- Capacity: 1,240
- Location: Cholargos, Greece
- Team colors: Blue, White
- President: Kostas Toutouzas
- 2024–25 position: 3rd
- Website: holargosbc.gr
Home	Away

Holargos B.C. (alternate spellings: Cholargos) is a Greek professional basketball club. The club is located in Cholargos, a suburban town in the Athens agglomeration, Greece. The club's full name is Athlitiki Enosi Holargou (Greek: Αθλητική Ένωση Χολαργού), which is abbreviated as (Α.Ε. Χολαργού), and which means Basketball Club Holargos. In 2016, the club was merged with Livadeia, and was thus promoted to the Greek 2nd Division. In 2019, the club merged with Kolossos. In 2020 Holargos BC men's team makes a restart and will play in the 2nd Division of ESKA Championship.

Since 2023, Holargos BC men’s team has been promoted and plays in the National League 1 in Greece.

== History ==
In 2009, Holargos appeared for the first time in the 4th-tier level of the Greek national championships, in the Greek C League. In 2012, the club was promoted to the 3rd-tier level Greek B League, and stayed there for 3 years.

In 2016, the club merged with Livadeia, in order to be able to participate in the 2nd-tier level Greek A2 League. During the 2016 summer transfer window, Holargos managed to make some very good transfers (for that level of competition), including Nikos Angelopoulos, Georgios Apostolidis, Georgios Tsiakos, Igor Milošević, and Kevin Bleeker, who became the first non-Greek player to sign with the team.

In 2018, Holargos BC got promoted to the top-tier level Greek Basket League for the first time in its history, after defeating Apollon Patras in the finals of the Greek A2 Basket League promotion playoffs. For their first year in the Greek Basket League, Holargos appointed Aris Lykogiannis as the team's head coach.

After a successful 2018–19 season, in which Holargos reached the Greek Basket League playoffs and ranked 8th in the final league standings, the future of the club in the first division came into question, due to an announcement which declared that Holargos would not be participating in the 2019–20 campaign because of financial problems, and was seeking to concede their registration in the league to another club. Eventually, the majority owner of the club sold the club's tax ID to Kolossos Rodou. Holargos decided not to play in any League in the 2019–20 season.

In June 2020, the Board of Directors of Holargos decided the restart of the men's team, which in the 2020-21 season will participate in the championship of ESKA 2nd Division.

== Arena ==
Holargos plays its home games at the "Antonis Tritsis" Indoor Hall, which was opened in 1990. The arena originally had a seating capacity of 800, but it was increased to 1,240 for the club's debut in the top-tier level Greek Basket League's 2018–19 season.

== Season by season ==
Season	Tier	Division	Pos.	W–L	Greek Cup	European competitions
2009–10	4	C Basket League	3rd	18–6		
2010–11	4	C Basket League	3rd	17–9		
2011–12	4	C Basket League	2nd	17–4		
2012–13	3	B Basket League	7th	11–13		
2013–14	3	B Basket League	8th	12–13		
2014–15	3	B Basket League	10th	10–16		
2015–16	3	B Basket League	6th	16–12		
2016–17	2	A2 Basket League	6th	17–13		
2017–18	2	A2 Basket League	2nd	25–5		
2018–19	1	Basket League	7th	13–16		

== Roster ==
The team has not signed any players ahead of the new season. The club's first team matches will be played by the U-18 academy players.

== Notable players ==
Note: Flags indicate national team eligibility at FIBA-sanctioned events. Players may hold other non-FIBA nationalities not displayed.

Criteria

To appear in this section a player must have either:

- Set a club record or won an individual award while at the club
- Played at least one official international match for their national team at any time
- Played at least one official NBA match at any time.

- Nikos Angelopoulos
- Giorgos Bogris
- Grigoris Rallatos
- Georgios Apostolidis
- Panos Kalaitzakis
- Akis Kallinikidis
- Michalis Kamperidis
- Dimitrios Kompodietas
- Thomas Kottas
- Spyros Motsenigos
- Nikos Papanikolaou
- Sakis Skoulidas
- Alexis Spyridonidis
- Tasos Spyropoulos
- Angelos Tsamis
- Georgios Tsiakos
- / Vlado Janković
- / Igor Milošević
- Robert Gilchrist
- Teddy Okereafor
- Kevin Bleeker
- Danny Agbelese
- Rashad Bell
- Darrin Dorsey
- Toarlyn Fitzpatrick
- Javontae Hawkins
- Jermaine Love
- Gary Talton

== Head coaches ==
Head Coach	Years
(Greece) Savvas Symeonidis	2011–2013
(Greece) Savvas Katsounis	2013–2014
(Greece) Nikos Chatzipyniyris	2014–2015
(Greece) Kostas Papamarkos	2015–2016
(Greece) Memos Ioannou	2016
(Greece) Stergios Koufos	2016–2018
(Greece) Aris Lykogiannis	2018–2019
(Greece) Nikos Linoxilakis	2020–2022

|-

| (Greece) Thanasis Thomopoulos ||

2022–2025

|} |-

| (Greece) Stergios Koufos ||

2025–now
