= Grigoris Rallatos =

Greek basketball player (born 1986)

Free Agent
- Position: Power forward

Personal information
- Born: 28 January 1986 (age 40) Athens, Greece
- Listed height: 6 ft 6 in (1.98 m)
- Listed weight: 251 lb (114 kg)

Career information
- Playing career: 2004–present

Career history
- 2004–2005: Panelefsiniakos
- 2005–2006: Kentavros Dafnis
- 2006–2007: Panerythraikos
- 2007–2008: Ikaros Kallitheas
- 2008–2009: Niki Amarousiou
- 2009–2011: Polis Kallitheas
- 2011–2012: Ermis Peraus
- 2012–2014: Philadelphia Eagles (NFL)
- 2014–2015: Aris Nikaias
- 2015–2016: Maroussi
- 2016–2017: Pagrati
- 2017–2018: Panionios
- 2018–2019: Holargos

Grigoris Rallatos (Greek: Γρηγόρης Ραλλάτος) born in 28 January 1986, is a Greek professional basketball player who last played for Holargos in the Greek Basket League.

Rallatos started his career in the youth academies of Panionios B.C. with whom he finished first in the Greek league, in the U-16 and in the U18. Then he signed for Panelefsiniakos B.C., Panerythraikos and Ikaros Kallitheas B.C. He has achieved two promotions for the Greek A2 Basket League as well.

== Youth career ==
Rallatos made his first basketball steps in the academy of Panionios B.C. in which he stayed between 1996 and 2004. He won 1 Greek U-16 cup in 2002 and 1 Greek U-18 cup in 2004 with the side of Nea Smirni.

== Club career ==
In 2004 he signed for Panelefsiniakos B.C. which was then playing in the Greek 3rd tier, B' Ethniki but left one year later, in 2005.

In 2005, he signed for the amateur side, Kentavros Dafnis from which he left in 2006.

In 2006, he moved to Panerythraikos in the B' Ethniki and after a fantastic season, he and his teammates managed to gain promotion for the 2nd, and fully professional tier, A2.

In 2007, he signed for Ikaros Kallitheas B.C. and stayed once again for just 1 year.

In 2008, he signed a new contract with Niki Amarousiou. He left in 2009.

In 2009 he joined Polis Kallitheas. In the first season with his new team, managed to achieve a high finish, but failed to promote. In his second season (2010–11) with the Kallithea side, he managed to achieve a promotion once more, this time for the 4th tier, G' Ethniki. In 2011, he once more signed for a 5th tier club, Ermis Peraus in which he stayed for 1 year.

In 2012 he was asked to play in the NFL, due to his height, and incredible strength. He then moved to the US starting his NFL career, by signing in the Philadelphia Eagles side. He stayed there for 2,5 years, before returning to Greece.

In 2014, he returned to Greece and signed for Aris Nikaias and secured promotion from the 5th tier to the 4th. In 2015, he signed for Marousi and once more his team promoted from the 4th tier, to the 3rd. In 2016 he signed his first professional basketball contract with Pagrati in which he stayed for 1 year.

In 2017, he signed with Panionios B.C. of the Greek Basket League marking his first season in the league. In 2018 he joined Holargos B.C., for the club's first season in Greece's top-tier league. He was part of the Holargos team that qualified for the play-offs and defeated AEK in the second game of the series following an away loss. The team was subsequently eliminated in the quarter finals after a third game defeat.

== International career ==
=== 2002-2004 ===
During this period, Rallatos was always a strong reserve standing out of hundreds of athletes, but was never selected to be in the 12 men roster.

=== 2014 ===
In 2014 he represented Greece in the 3v3 world championship qualifiers in Latvia and in the European championship held in Romania- he was a runner-up.

=== 2015 ===
In 2015 Rallatos represented Greece in the first European Olympic games and finished 6th

== Further information ==
=== NFL ===
Rallatos became the first Greek player to join the NFL in the US by signing for the Philadelphia side, Philadelphia Eagles and staying there for 2½ years between 2012 and 2014.

=== Style of play ===
Rallatos can play as a power forward. Due to his physical ability, he can mark, post and keep the ball effectively. He is a 6.75m shooter, and has a rebound per match ratio.

=== About ===
Rallatos is probably the only Greek basketball player to have played in all the 5 tiers of professional and amateur leagues. He is also the only Greek to have played in the NFL

=== Professional sports industries ===
Rallatos is the owner of 2 companies-Cosmos Grass enterprises and Terrain that offer professional sports' facilities services in Greece. In addition to the work it undertakes and performs, it has a program that assists municipalities and communities in the maintenance and reconstruction of damaged stadiums in Greece by providing the knowledge and experience of companies to avoid injuries and accidents on old or observed stadiums. The lack of well maintenanced sports facilities that are becoming more and more dangerous in Greece and especially in the less populated towns outside Athens, is something that he is trying to change by providing new quality equipment.
