= Kevin Bleeker =

Dutch basketball player (born 1993)

Personal information
- Born: 10 May 1993 (age 33) Alkmaar, Netherlands
- Listed height: 6 ft 10 in (2.08 m)
- Listed weight: 225 lb (102 kg)

Career information
- College: Canisius (2011–2016)
- NBA draft: 2016: undrafted
- Playing career: 2016–2023
- Position: Center

Career history
- 2016: Holargos
- 2016–2017: Navarra
- 2017–2018: New Heroes Den Bosch
- 2018–2022: Landstede Hammers
- 2022–2023: Den Helder Suns

Career highlights
- DBL champion (2019)

Kevin Bleeker (born 10 May 1993) is a Dutch former basketball player. He played for Holargos in Greece, Navarra in Spain and for Heroes Den Bosch, Landstede Hammers and Den Helder Suns in the Netherlands. Bleeker also played college basketball in the United States with the Canisius Golden Griffins. He won the Dutch Basketball League with the Landstede Hammers, the club's first title ever, in 2019.

== Early life ==
Bleeker first played for the junior teams of BV Noordkop in the Netherlands. He also played for various junior squads of the Dutch, including the U18 team that played on the European Championship in Bulgaria. He also played in the 16th annual Holland - Nordic Basketball Tournament in April 2011.

== College career ==
Bleeker started his career with the Golden Griffins in the 2011–12 season. He played in 30 games and started 6 in his rookie year. He scored a career high 18 points against South Dakota on 18 December 2011. He opted to redshirt the 2012–13 season. In the next season, he contributed again, as he averaged 6.4 minutes per game.

== Professional career ==
In June 2017, Bleeker signed a one-year contract with New Heroes Den Bosch of the Dutch Basketball League (DBL), with an option to a second year.

In 2018, Bleeker joined the Landstede Hammers and helped the team win the DBL championship in his first season.

In June 2022, he signed with Den Helder Suns, marking a return to Den Helder after 11 years. In April 2023, during the 2022–23 season with the Suns, Bleeker announced his retirement from basketball. After a slow recovery from a severe knee injury, he was advised by doctors to stop playing professional sports.

== International career ==
In 2014, Bleeker played his first games for the Dutch national basketball team in the FIBA EuroBasket 2015 qualification. He was part of the team that qualified for EuroBasket 2015, the country's first EuroBasket qualification since 25 years. Overall, Bleeker played in a total of 11 games for the Netherlands.
