= Linos Chrysikopoulos =

Greek basketball player (born 1992)

Linos Chrysikopoulos Λίνος Χρυσικόπουλος
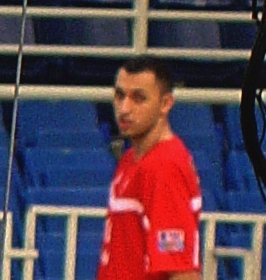
- Chrysikopoulos with Nea Kifissia in 2016

Personal information
- Born: December 1, 1992 (age 33) Corfu, Greece
- Listed height: 2.10 m (6 ft 11 in)
- Listed weight: 102 kg (225 lb)

Career information
- Playing career: 2008–present
- Position: Power forward

Career history
- 2008–2011: Aris Thessaloniki
- 2011–2013: Pallacanestro Biella
- 2013: PAOK Thessaloniki
- 2013–2015: KAOD
- 2015–2016: Nea Kifissia
- 2016–2019: PAOK Thessaloniki
- 2019–2021: AEK Athens
- 2021–2022: Peristeri
- 2022–2023: Kolossos Rodou
- 2023–2025: Promitheas Patras
- 2025–2026: Kolossos Rodou

Career highlights
- Greek Cup winner (2020); Greek League All Star (2019)

Linos-Spyridon Chrysikopoulos (Greek: Λίνος-Σπυρίδων Χρυσικόπουλος; born December 1, 1992) is a Greek professional basketball player. He is 6 ft 9 in (2.06 m) tall and 225 pounds (102 kg). He plays at the power forward position and his nickname is Spider-Man.

== Professional career ==
Born in Corfu, Greece, Chrysikopoulos began his professional career during the 2008–09 season, with the Greek League club Aris Thessaloniki, and stayed there for three seasons. On July 13, 2011, he moved to the Italian League club Biella. He was released by Biella in January 2013.

After leaving Biella, he joined the Greek League club PAOK. He then moved the Greek club KAOD. He signed with Nea Kifissia on August 16, 2015.

He returned to PAOK in 2016. On August 24, 2019, Chrysikopoulos signed a three-year deal with AEK Athens.

On August 9, 2021, Chrysikopoulos signed with Peristeri. On April 18, 2022, he was suspended for the rest of the season, along with teammate Dimitris Katsivelis, after they both fell out of favor with the club's new head coach Milan Tomić. In 16 league games, he averaged 7.2 points, 2.2 rebounds and 1.2 assists per contest.

On August 18, 2022, Chrysikopoulos moved south to Kolossos Rodou. In 25 games, he averaged 5.2 points and 3.4 rebounds in 20 minutes per contest.

On August 7, 2023, Chrysikopoulos joined his long-time coach Ilias Papatheodorou at Promitheas Patras.

On August 12, 2025, Chrysikopoulos returned to Kolossos Rodou.

== National team career ==
Chrysikopoulos was a member of the Greek junior national teams. He played at the 2008 FIBA Europe Under-16 Championship, the 2009 FIBA Europe Under-18 Championship, the 2010 FIBA Europe Under-18 Championship, and the 2011 FIBA Europe Under-20 Championship.

He has also been a member of the senior men's Greek national basketball team. He played at the 2019 FIBA World Cup qualification, as well as the 2020 Olympic Qualifying Tournament, in Victoria, Canada, under coach Rick Pitino.

== Player profile ==
Chrysikopoulos was originally listed as 6'10" in height in shoes, with a 7'1" wingspan. He can defend multiple positions and run a team's offense if necessary, being utilized as a point forward.

== Career statistics ==
=== FIBA Champions League ===
Year	Team	GP	MPG	FG%	3P%	FT%	RPG	APG	SPG	BPG	PPG
2016–17	PAOK	18	20.9	.488	.261	.594	4.7	1.7	.4	.4	8.1
2017–18	PAOK	14	18.0	.409	.341	.727	2.9	.8	.4	.6	6.7
2018–19	PAOK	16	23.1	.574	.459	.595	2.9	1.3	.9	.5	10.7

==== Regular season ====
Note: Only games in the primary domestic competitions are included. Therefore, games in cup or European competitions are left out.

Year	Team	League	GP	MPG	FG%	3P%	FT%	RPG	APG	SPG	BPG	PPG
2013–14	KAOD	GBL	5	18.0	.556	.417	-	3.2	.4	.4	.2	7.0
2014–15	KAOD	GBL	13	16.4	.362	.241	.700	2.5	1.3	.9	.3	4.9
2015–16	Kifissia	GBL	22	10.2	.491	.294	.727	1.3	.6	.4	.3	3.4
2016–17	PAOK	GBL	26	19.5	.551	.333	.698	4.3	.9	.7	.6	8.4
2017–18	PAOK	GBL	25	17.1	.504	.339	.667	3.0	.8	.3	.3	6.8
2018–19	PAOK	GBL	26	21.0	.469	.316	.788	3.1	1.3	.9	.5	8.9
