= Nikos Angelopoulos =

Greek professional basketball player

Nikos Angelopoulos Νίκος Αγγελόπουλος
Trikoupis
- Position: Power forward / center
- League: Greek A2 Basket League

Personal information
- Born: June 27, 1984 (age 42) Athens, Greece
- Listed height: 6 ft 8.75 in (2.05 m)
- Listed weight: 260 lb (118 kg)

Career information
- NBA draft: 2006: undrafted
- Playing career: 2002–present

Career history
- 2002–2004: Ilysiakos
- 2004–2008: Panionios
- 2008–2009: Aigaleo
- 2009–2012: Kavala
- 2012–2014: Rethymno
- 2014–2015: Koroivos Amaliadas
- 2015–2016: Faros Keratsiniou
- 2016–2017: Holargos
- 2017–2018: Doxa Lefkadas
- 2018–2019: Aigaleo
- 2019–2020: Ethnikos Piraeus
- 2020–2023: Megarida
- 2023: Ionikos Nikaias
- 2023: Aias Evosmou
- 2023–present: Charilaos Trikoupis
Medals
Men's basketball
Representing Greece
FIBA Europe U-18 Championship
Bronze medal – third place	2002 Germany	Under-18
FIBA U-21 World Cup
Silver medal – second place	2005 Mar del Plata	Under-21

Nikolaos "Nikos" Angelopoulos (Greek: Νικόλαος "Νίκος" Αγγελόπουλος; born June 27, 1984) is a Greek professional basketball player for Charilaos Trikoupis of the Greek A2 Basket League. He is a 2.05 m (6 ft 8 3/4 in) tall power forward-center.

== Professional career ==
Angelopoulos played with the junior teams of Galatsi from 1995 to 2001, before joining moving to Ilysiakos, where he made his pro debut in 2002 in the Greek 2nd Division. During his professional career, Angelopoulos has played with the following clubs: Ilysiakos, Panionios, Aigaleo, Kavala, Rethymno, Koroivos Amaliadas, and Faros Keratsiniou.

During the 2022-2023 Greek Basket League season with Ionikos, in 5 games, he averaged 1.6 points in 11 minutes per contest.

== National team career ==
Angelopoulos was a member of the junior national teams of Greece. With Greece's junior national teams, he played at the 2002 FIBA Europe Under-18 Championship, where he won a bronze medal, and at the 2005 FIBA Under-21 World Cup, where he won a silver medal.
