= Nikos Tsiakmas =

Greek basketball player (born 1999)

No. 7 – Kolossos Rodou
- Position: Point guard
- League: Greek Basketball League

Personal information
- Born: 29 October 1999 (age 27) Volos, Greece
- Listed height: 6 ft 1.7 in (1.87 m)
- Listed weight: 194 lb (88 kg)

Career information
- Playing career: 2017–present

Career history
- 2017–2018: Esperos Panagia Alexiotissa
- 2018–2019: Akrata
- 2019–2022: Apollon Patras
- 2022–2024: PAOK Thessaloniki
- 2024–2026: Iraklis Thessaloniki
- 2026–present: Kolossos Rodou

Career highlights
- Greek Elite League champion (2021)

Nikolaos Tsiakmas (Greek: Νικόλαος "Νίκος" Τσιακμάς; born 29 October 1999) is a Greek professional basketball player for Kolossos Rodou of the Greek Basketball League. He is a 1.87 metres (6 feet 2 inches) tall point guard.

== Professional career ==
Tsiakmas began playing basketball with the youth teams of Kolossos Rodou. During his amateur career, he played with Esperos Patras, Niki Volos, Promitheas Patras and Akrata, before starting his pro career with Apollon Patras.

After 3 years with the club and one promotion to the Greek Basket League, Tsiakmas joined PAOK. He stayed with the club for 2 years.

On 29 July 2024, Tsiakmas moved to Iraklis Thessaloniki. He renewed his contract with the club on 17 June 2025 for one more year.
