= Jackson Kreuser =

American basketball player (born 1999)

No. 34 – Kolossos Rodou
- Position: Power forward / center
- League: Greek Basketball League

Personal information
- Born: March 5, 1999 (age 27) White Bear Lake, Minnesota, U.S.
- Listed height: 6 ft 10 in (2.08 m)
- Listed weight: 245 lb (111 kg)

Career information
- High school: Totino-Grace (Fridley, Minnesota)
- College: North Dakota State (2017–2022)
- NBA draft: 2022: undrafted
- Playing career: 2022–present

Career history
- 2022–2023: Nürnberg Falcons
- 2023–2024: Antwerp Giants
- 2024–2025: PAOK Thessaloniki
- 2025–2026: Panionios
- 2026–present: Kolossos Rhodes

Career highlights
- 2× First-team All-Summit League (2021, 2022); 2× NABC All-District Second Team (2021, 2022); Third-team Academic All-America (2022); Summit League All-Tournament Team (2021)

Jackson "Rocky" Kreuser (born March 5, 1999) is an American professional basketball player for Kolossos Rhodes of the Greek Basketball League (GBL). He plays primarily at the power forward position and can also play as a center. He played college basketball for the North Dakota State Bison from 2017 to 2022.

== Early life and high school career ==
Kreuser was born in White Bear Lake, Minnesota. He attended Totino-Grace High School in Fridley, Minnesota, where he played both basketball and American football.

As a junior, he averaged 16.4 points, 7.5 rebounds and 2.1 blocks per game while shooting 41 percent from three-point range and was a unanimous all-conference selection. As a senior in 2016–17, he averaged 16.9 points per game. Kreuser also played tight end for Totino-Grace's football team and helped the school win a state championship during his senior year.

== College career ==
Kreuser played five seasons at North Dakota State University from 2017 to 2022, taking advantage of the additional season of eligibility granted to college athletes as a result of the COVID-19 pandemic.

As a freshman in 2017–18, Kreuser appeared in all 32 games and averaged 3.8 points and 2.0 rebounds per game. His role increased during his sophomore and junior seasons, and in 2019–20 he started 31 games, averaging 10.0 points and 6.0 rebounds while leading the Bison with 27 blocks.

Kreuser emerged as one of North Dakota State's leading players during the 2020–21 season. He averaged 15.7 points and 7.0 rebounds per game and was named to the First Team All-Summit League and the NABC All-District Second Team. During the Summit League Tournament, he averaged 23.3 points and 8.0 rebounds over three games and scored a career-high 34 points in the championship game. He was subsequently named to the Summit League All-Tournament Team.

In his fifth and final college season in 2021–22, Kreuser again earned First Team All-Summit League and NABC All-District Second Team honors. He led North Dakota State in both scoring and rebounding, averaging 15.6 points and 7.8 rebounds per game while shooting 39.1 percent from three-point range. He was also named a third-team Academic All-American.

Kreuser finished his college career having played a school-record 158 games. He scored 1,675 points, which ranked eighth in North Dakota State history at the time, and collected 831 rebounds and 118 blocks. He became only the second player in program history to record more than 1,600 points, 800 rebounds and 100 blocks.

== Professional career ==
=== Nürnberg Falcons (2022–2023) ===
After going undrafted in the 2022 NBA draft, Kreuser began his professional career in Germany. On August 24, 2022, he signed a one-year contract with the Nürnberg Falcons of the ProA, the country's second-tier professional league.

In his rookie professional season, Kreuser became a regular member of Nürnberg's starting lineup. He averaged approximately 13.4 points, 5.4 rebounds and 1.6 assists per game while shooting 33.3 percent from three-point range.

=== Antwerp Giants (2023–2024) ===
On June 30, 2023, Kreuser signed with Belgian club Telenet Giants Antwerp for the 2023–24 season.

He appeared in 39 games across all competitions during the season, averaging 8.1 points and 4.9 rebounds per game while shooting 36 percent from three-point range and 82.7 percent from the free-throw line. Antwerp advanced to the domestic league finals during his season with the club.

=== PAOK Thessaloniki (2024–2025) ===
On July 5, 2024, Kreuser signed with PAOK Thessaloniki for the 2024–25 season, marking his first season in the Greek Basketball League.

Kreuser became a regular starter in PAOK's frontcourt. In the Greek League, he appeared in 22 regular-season games and averaged 9.5 points, 5.0 rebounds and 1.3 assists in 26.6 minutes per game.

He also played a prominent role in PAOK's European campaign. After appearing in two Basketball Champions League qualification games, Kreuser played all 18 games of PAOK's run to the 2024–25 FIBA Europe Cup Final, averaging 9.4 points, 5.3 rebounds and 1.3 assists per game.

In the first leg of the FIBA Europe Cup Final against Bilbao Basket, Kreuser recorded five points and nine rebounds. He scored 12 points, grabbed five rebounds and added three assists in the second leg as PAOK ultimately finished runners-up.

Across all competitions for PAOK during the season, Kreuser made 47 appearances and averaged 9.2 points, 5.1 rebounds and 1.4 assists per game.

=== Panionios (2025–2026) ===
On July 1, 2025, Kreuser remained in Greece and signed with Panionios ahead of the 2025–26 season. The move also gave him his first opportunity to play in the EuroCup.

Kreuser appeared in a total of 42 games for Panionios across the Greek League and EuroCup, averaging 8.1 points, 3.7 rebounds and 1.1 assists per game. He played 24 games in the Greek League, averaging 7.7 points, 3.8 rebounds and 1.2 assists per game.

=== Kolossos Rhodes (2026–present) ===
On June 19, 2026, Kreuser signed with Kolossos Rhodes, remaining in the Greek Basketball League for a third consecutive season.

The move was also his third consecutive season with a different Greek club, following his spells with PAOK and Panionios. Kolossos entered the 2026–27 season in the qualification rounds of the Basketball Champions League, with the possibility of continuing in the FIBA Europe Cup if the club did not qualify for the BCL regular season.

In his first comments after joining the club, Kreuser said that discussions with the coaching staff and his familiarity with the Greek League influenced his decision to sign with Kolossos.

== Personal life ==
Although his given name is Jackson, Kreuser has been known as Rocky throughout his basketball career. He has stated that virtually nobody calls him Jackson and explained that the nickname originated from a name that his father had originally been expected to receive.

== Career statistics ==
=== College ===
Year	Team	GP	GS	PPG	RPG	APG
2017–18	North Dakota State	32	0	3.8	2.0	0.4
2018–19	North Dakota State	33	2	8.7	3.9	0.8
2019–20	North Dakota State	33	31	10.0	6.0	1.1
2020–21	North Dakota State	27	27	15.7	7.0	1.6
2021–22	North Dakota State	33	33	15.6	7.8	1.1
