= Tasos Antonakis =

Greek basketball player (born 1992)

Tasos Antonakis Τάσος Αντωνάκης
Personal information
- Born: 9 February 1992 (age 34) Athens, Greece
- Listed height: 6 ft 8.75 in (2.05 m)
- Listed weight: 250 lb (113 kg)

Career information
- Playing career: 2008–present
- Position: Power forward / center

Career history
- 2008–2011: AEK Athens
- 2011–2012: Pagrati
- 2012–2014: Ilysiakos
- 2014–2015: Apollon Patras
- 2015–2016: Pagrati
- 2016–2017: Ethnikos Piraeus
- 2017–2018: Koroivos Amaliadas
- 2018–2020: Charilaos Trikoupis
- 2020–2021: Apollon Patras
- 2021–2022: Triton Sepolia
- 2022–2024: Panionios

Career highlights
- 2x Greek 2nd Division champion (2020, 2021)

Anastasios "Tasos" Antonakis (alternative spelling: Tassos) (Greek: Αναστάσιος "Τάσος" Αντωνάκης; born 9 February 1992 in Athens, Greece) is a Greek professional basketball player who last played for Panionios of the Greek A2 Basket League. He is 2.05 m (6 ft 8 3/4 in) tall, and he plays at the power forward and center positions.

== Professional career ==
Antonakis began his professional career in the Greek League with AEK Athens in 2008. He then moved to the Greek Second Division club Pagrati in 2011. He joined Ilysiakos in 2012.

He also played with the Greek clubs Apollon Patras, Ethnikos Piraeus, and Koroivos Amaliadas, before joining Charilaos Trikoupis, in 2018.

== National team career ==
With the junior national teams of Greece, Antonakis played at the following tournaments: the 2008 FIBA Europe Under-16 Championship, the 2009 FIBA Europe Under-18 Championship, the 2010 FIBA Europe Under-18 Championship, the 2011 FIBA Europe Under-20 Championship, and the 2012 FIBA Europe Under-20 Championship.

He was the high scorer for the junior team of Greece, with 13 points in their final game at the 2010 FIBA Europe Under-18 Championship.
