= Kolossos Rodou B.C. =

Kolossos H Hotels
- Nickname: Θαλασσί (The Cerulean Blue)
- Leagues: Greek Basketball League; Europe Cup
- Founded: 1963; 63 years ago
- History: Kolossos Rodou B.C. (1963–present)
- Arena: Kallithea Palais des Sports
- Capacity: 3,400
- Location: Rhodes, Greece
- Team colors: Cyan and white
- Main sponsor: H Hotels Collection
- President: Michalis Kokkinos
- Head coach: Aris Lykogiannis
- Championships: 1 Greek 2nd Division
- Website: kolossosbc.gr
Home	Away

Kolossos Rodou B.C. (Greek: Κολοσσός Ρόδου K.A.E.), known as Kolossos H Hotels for sponsorship reasons, is a Greek professional basketball team that is located on the island of Rhodes, in Rhodes City. Kolossos currently plays in the top-tier level of Greek professional basketball, the Greek Basketball League (GBL). The club was founded in 1963, and also initially featured sports like volleyball and judo in the early 1980s. Today, the focus of the Greek athletic club is on the franchise's men's basketball department.

== History ==
=== Early years ===
Due to geographical isolation, and very small financial abilities for most of the club's history, the basketball team was not able to compete at a high level for many years, and was not funded properly. Kolossos was the first Greek basketball team located in the Aegean Sea region.

=== Rise ===
In 2000, the fate of the team finally changed, when Kostas Kostaridis became the new team President, and took over the reins of the club. Kostaridis changed almost the entire club management, and stated that it was the immediate goal of the team to rise from the 3rd-tier level Greek B League, to the 2nd-tier level Greek A2 League, and subsequently, the team did begin to rise up through Greece's club basketball league system.

In 2003, head coach Vassilis Fragkias joined the team, and the ascent up into the Greek A2 League division commenced. In the 2004–05 season, Kolossos won the championship of the Greek A2 League, and was therefore automatically promoted up into the top-tier level Greek League, the highest professional basketball league in Greece.

=== Merger with Holargos ===
In the 2018–19 Greek Basketball League season, Kolossos finished in last place in the league. The team was thus facing relegation down to the second-tier level Greek A2 League. However, Kolossos merged with Holargos, and gained their rights to play in the top-tier level Greek League, in the following 2019–20 Greek Basketball League season.

== Arenas ==
Through the 2018–19 season, Kolossos played its domestic Greek Basketball League games at the 1,242 seat Venetokleio Indoor Hall. Prior to the 2019–20 season, Kolossos moved into the 1,400 seat Palais des Sports. The arena's seating capacity was increased to 3,400 people, so that Kolossos could play its home games there, while competing in the European secondary level FIBA Champions League competition.

== Season by season ==
Season	Tier	Division	Pos.	W–L	Greek Cup	European competitions	
2009–10	1	Basket League	6th	14–14			
2010–11	1	Basket League	8th	12–14	Quarterfinalist		
2011–12	1	Basket League	4th	22–13			
2012–13	1	Basket League	10th	8–18			
2013–14	1	Basket League	10th	10–16			
2014–15	1	Basket League	7th	14–15			
2015–16	1	Basket League	7th	11–17			
2016–17	1	Basket League	7th	14–15	Quarterfinalist		
2017–18	1	Basket League	8th	11–17	Quarterfinalist		
2018–19	1	Basket League	13th	5–21	Quarterfinalist		
2019–20	1	Basket League	9th	8–12			
2020–21	1	Basket League	7th	8–16	Quarterfinalist		
2021–22	1	Basket League	5th	15–11	Phase 2		
2022–23	1	Basket League	7th	11–13	Quarterfinalist		
2023–24	1	Basket League	6th	10–19			
2024–25	1	Basket League	10th	10–18		3 Champions League	RS

== Honours and titles ==
- Greek 2nd Division
  - Champion (1): 2004–05
- Mavroskoufia Basketball Tournament
  - Winner (2): 2016, 2019 (shared)

== Players ==
=== Roster ===
Note: Flags indicate national team eligibility at FIBA-sanctioned events. Players may hold other non-FIBA nationalities not displayed.

Kolossos Rodou roster
Players
Coaches

Pos.	No.	Nat.	Name	Ht.	Wt.	Age
G	2	(United States)	Willis, Payton	1.93 m (6 ft 4 in)	91 kg (201 lb)	28 – 31 January 1998
PG	4	(Greece)	Karampelas, Zois	1.86 m (6 ft 1 in)	82 kg (181 lb)	25 – 27 April 2001
PG	5	(United States)	Manjon, Ezra	1.83 m (6 ft 0 in)	77 kg (170 lb)	25 – 3 December 2000
G	7	(Greece)	Tsiakmas, Nikos	1.88 m (6 ft 2 in)	88 kg (194 lb)	26 – 29 October 1999
C	9	(United States)	Upson, DeVonte	2.06 m (6 ft 9 in)	102 kg (225 lb)	33 – 23 March 1993
SF	11	(Greece)	Efstathiadis, Ioannis	1.98 m (6 ft 6 in)		23 – 29 April 2003
PG	13	(Greece)	Kalaitzakis, Alexandros	1.86 m (6 ft 1 in)		23 – 11 March 2003
F/C	14	(Greece)	Christidis, Vassilis	2.07 m (6 ft 9 in)	109 kg (240 lb)	28 – 10 July 1998
G/F	21	(Greece)	Kamperidis, Giorgos	2.01 m (6 ft 7 in)	95 kg (209 lb)	27 – 1 October 1999
SG	22	(United States)	Harris, C. J.	1.91 m (6 ft 3 in)	86 kg (190 lb)	35 – 19 February 1991
PF	26	(United States)	Stevenson, Tyler	2.03 m (6 ft 8 in)	98 kg (216 lb)	26 – 21 April 2000
F	33	(United States)	Barnett, Jordan	2.01 m (6 ft 7 in)	95 kg (209 lb)	30 – 31 December 1995
PF	34	(United States)	Kreuser, Jackson	2.08 m (6 ft 10 in)	111 kg (245 lb)	27 – 5 March 1999

Head coach

- (Greece) Aris Lykogiannis

Assistant coach(es)

- (Greece) Andreas Gavalas
- (Croatia) Zarko Djuric

Legend

- (C) Team captain
- Injured

- Roster
Updated: 12 July 2026

=== Depth chart ===
Pos.	Starting 5	Bench 1	Bench 2
C	Devonte Upson	Tyler Stevenson	Vassilis Christidis
PF	Jackson Kreuser	Jordan Barnett
SF	Giorgos Kamperidis	Alexandros Kalaitzakis	Ioannis Efstathiadis
SG	Payton Willis	CJ Harris
PG	Ezra Manjon	Nikos Tsiakmas	Zois Karampelas

=== Notable players ===
Note: Flags indicate national team eligibility at FIBA-sanctioned events. Players may hold other non-FIBA nationalities not displayed.

Criteria

To appear in this section a player must have either:

- Set a club record or won an individual award while at the club
- Played at least one official international match for their national team at any time
- Played at least one official NBA match at any time.

- (Greece) Antonis Asimakopoulos
- (Greece) Sotiris Billis
- (Greece) Kostas Charissis
- (Greece) Manolis Chatzidakis
- (Greece) Linos Chrysikopoulos
- (Greece) Georgios Diamantopoulos
- (Greece) Ioannis Georgallis
- (Greece) Charis Giannopoulos
- (Greece) Panagiotis Kafkis
- (Greece) Georgios Kalaitzis
- (Greece) Giannis Kalampokis
- (Greece) Nikos Kamarianos
- (Greece) Dimitris Katsivelis
- (Greece) Nestoras Kommatos
- (Greece) Giannoulis Larentzakis
- (Greece) Sotirios Manolopoulos
- (Greece) Vangelis Margaritis
- (Greece) Dimitris Mavroeidis
- (Greece) Spyros Panteliadis
- (Greece) Nikos Papanikolopoulos
- (Greece) Nikos Pappas
- (Greece) Christos Saloustros
- (Greece) Diamantis Slaftsakis
- (Greece) Christoforos Stefanidis
- (Greece) Vassilis Toliopoulos
- (Greece) Michalis Tsairelis
- (Greece) Dimitris Tsaldaris
- (Greece) Georgios Tsalmpouris
- (Greece) Angelos Tsamis
- (Greece) Panos Vasilopoulos
- (Greece) Vassilis Xanthopoulos
- (Greece) Thodoros Zaras
- (Greece) (United States) Pat Calathes
- (Greece) (United States) Steve Panos
- (Greece) (Serbia) Mladen Pantić
- (Greece) (Croatia) Franko Nakić
- (Croatia) Jurica Golemac
- (Finland) Roope Ahonen
- (Sweden) Tom Liden
- (Bosnia and Herzegovina) Stevan Nađfeji
- (Bosnia and Herzegovina) Miroslav Todić
- (Bosnia and Herzegovina) Saša Vasiljević
- (Serbia) Mihajlo Andrić
- (Serbia) Stefan Momirov
- (Serbia) Stefan Pot
- (Ukraine) Oleksandr Lypovyy
- (Turkey) Kerem Kanter
- (Austria) Luka Brajkovic
- (Angola) Yanick Moreira
- (France) Kim Tillie
- (Nigeria) (United States) Danny Agbelese
- (Nigeria) (United States) Daniel Utomi
- (Canada) Simisola Shittu
- (United States) Dominic Artis
- (United States) Tyrone Brazelton
- (United States) Travon Bryant
- (United States) LaRon Dendy
- (United States) (Georgia (country)) Michael Dixon
- (United States) Robert Dozier
- (United States) John Edwards
- (United States) Jordan Floyd
- (United States) Gary McGhee
- (United States) Kenny Goins
- (United States) Andrew Goudelock
- (United States) Malcolm Griffin
- (United States) Jamelle Hagins
- (United States) Langston Hall
- (United States) Dusty Hannahs
- (United States) Lance Harris
- (United States) Marcus Hatten
- (United States) Scotty Hopson
- (United States) Mike James
- (United States) Jared Jordan
- (United States) Lasan Kromah
- (United States) Kevin Langford
- (United States) Ty Lawson
- (United States) Kelvin Lewis
- (United States) Steve Logan
- (United States) Shonn Miller
- (United States) Bambale Osby
- (United States) London Perrantes
- (Panama) (United States) J. R. Pinnock
- (United States) Tyler Polley
- (United States) Juvonte Reddic
- (United States) Trevor Releford
- (United States) Steven Smith
- (United States) Taylor Smith
- (United States) TJ Starks
- (United States) Curtis Stinson
- (United States) Marquis Teague
- (United States) Dominic Waters
- (United States) Glynn Watson Jr.
- (United States) Kenny Williams
- (United States) James Young

== Head coaches ==
Head Coach	Years
(Greece) Charis Papazoglou	2001–2003
(Greece) Vassilis Fragkias	2003–2005
(Greece) Michalis Kyritsis	2005–2006
(Greece) Georgios Zevgkolis	2006–2007
(Greece) Vangelis Alexandris	2007–2008
(Greece) Ioannis Sfairopoulos	2008–2011
(Greece) Vassilis Fragkias	2011–2012
(Greece) Minas Gekos	2012–2013
(Greece) Vassilis Fragkias	2013
(Greece) Dimitrios Priftis	2013–2014
(Greece) Michalis Koutalianos	2014
(Greece) Aris Lykogiannis	2014–2018
(Greece) Nikos Vetoulas	2018
(Greece) Kostas Flevarakis	2018–2019
(Greece) Stergios Koufos	2019
(Greece) Aris Lykogiannis	2019–2020
(Greece) Ilias Kantzouris	2020–2022
(Greece) Ilias Papatheodorou	2022–2023
(Spain) Curro Segura	2023–2024
(Greece) Giorgos Sigalas	2024
(Greece) Makis Giatras	2024
