= Marcus Eriksson (basketball) =

Swedish basketball player (born 1993)

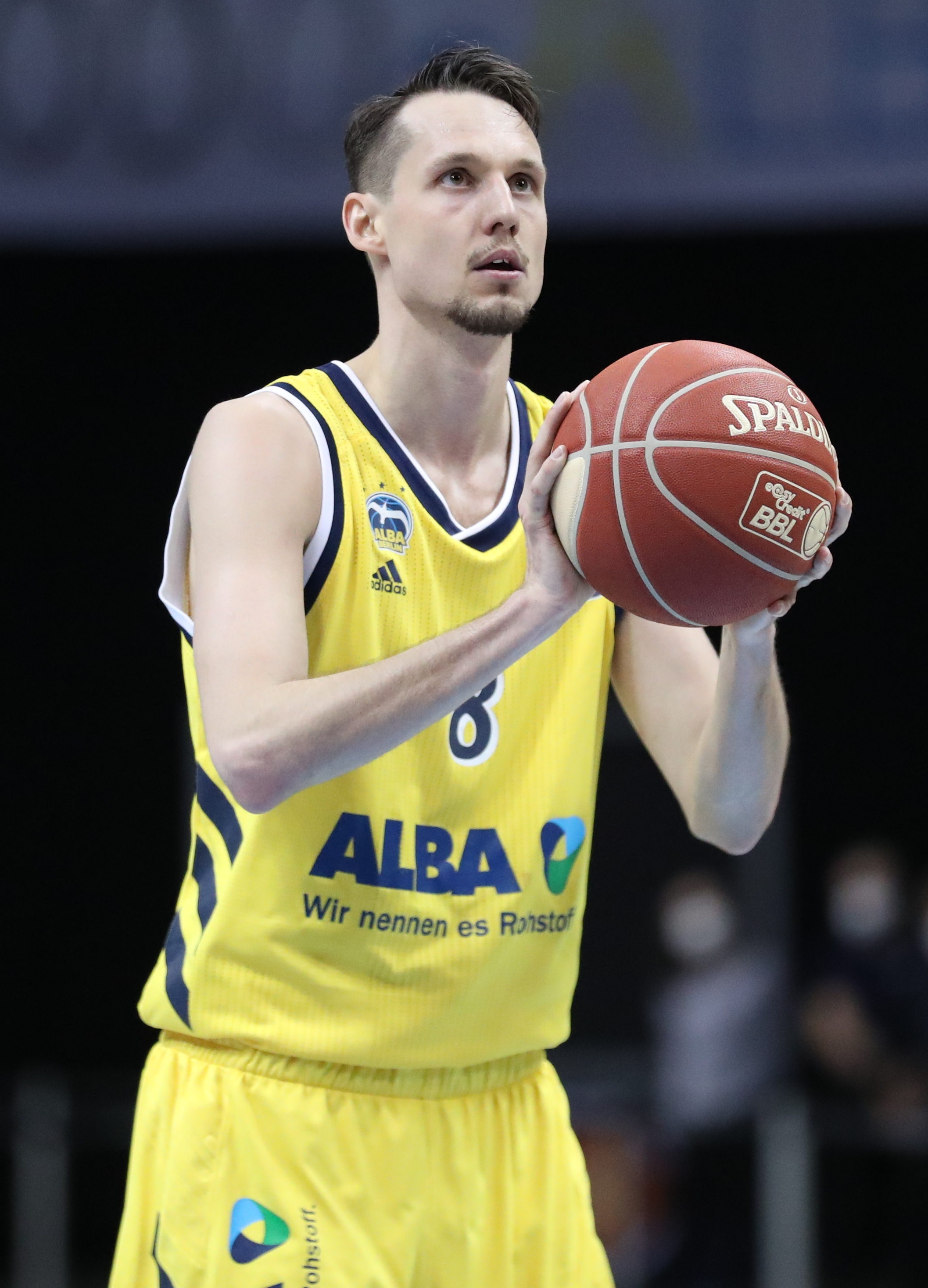
- Eriksson with Alba Berlin in 2021

Personal information
- Born: 5 December 1993 (age 32) Uppsala, Sweden
- Listed height: 6 ft 7 in (2.01 m)
- Listed weight: 208 lb (94 kg)

Career information
- NBA draft: 2015: 2nd round, 50th overall pick
- Drafted by: Atlanta Hawks
- Playing career: 2010–2024
- Position: Shooting guard / small forward

Career history
- 2010–2011: Manresa
- 2011–2017: FC Barcelona
- 2011–2013: →FC Barcelona B
- 2013–2014: →Manresa
- 2017–2019: Gran Canaria
- 2019–2024: Alba Berlin

Career highlights
- 3× Bundesliga champion (2020–2022); 2× German Cup winner (2020, 2022); All-Bundesliga First Team (2020); Spanish Supercup winner (2015); Liga ACB All-Star Game 3 Point Shootout champion (2017); All-Liga ACB Young Players Team (2014)
- Stats at Basketball Reference

Marcus Per Eriksson (born 5 December 1993) is a Swedish former professional basketball player.

== Early career ==
A native of Uppsala, Sweden, Eriksson left his country in 2010, to further his career at Bàsquet Manresa, in Spain. As a member of Manresa's youth team, he became the MVP of the L'Hospitalet's Junior Tournament in 2010, at the age of 16.

== Professional career ==
=== Europe ===
Eriksson made his professional debut in Spain's top-flight league, the ACB, with Manresa's senior men's team during the 2010–11 season. In 2011, he was signed by Spanish club FC Barcelona ("Barça"), and in his first years with Barcelona, he mainly played for their developmental farm team, FC Barcelona B. He returned to Manresa for the 2013–14 campaign, joining them on loan from Barcelona, before later heading back to Barça.

Eriksson missed the 2014–15 season, because of a torn ACL and torn meniscus.

After Eriksson's rehab from a major injury suffered early in 2022 continued to not progress, he and Alba Berlin agreed to terminate his contract on January 11, 2024. He then continued his recovery back in his native Sweden.

=== NBA draft right ===
On 25 June 2015 Eriksson was selected with the 50th pick of the 2015 NBA draft, by the Atlanta Hawks.

== National team ==
Eriksson was involved with the Swedish junior national teams for a number of years. With Sweden's junior national teams, he played at the 2009 FIBA Europe Under-16 Championship (Division B), the 2010 FIBA Europe Under-18 Championship, the 2012 FIBA Europe Under-20 Championship, and the 2013 FIBA Europe Under-20 Championship. In 2012, he had his first official appearance with the Swedish senior squad.

== Career statistics ==
Legend
GP	Games played	GS	Games started	MPG	Minutes per game
FG%	Field-goal percentage	3P%	3-point field-goal percentage	FT%	Free-throw percentage
RPG	Rebounds per game	APG	Assists per game	SPG	Steals per game
BPG	Blocks per game	PPG	Points per game	PIR	Performance index rating
**Bold**	Career high

=== EuroLeague ===
Year	Team	GP	GS	MPG	FG%	3P%	FT%	RPG	APG	SPG	BPG	PPG	PIR
2015–16	Barcelona	3	0	7.7	.250	.000	—	.7	.3	.3	—	.7	-1.0
2016–17	Barcelona	22	3	9.9	.320	.353	—	1.2	.3	.4	.1	2.0	1.2
2018–19	Gran Canaria	**29**	6	18.6	.443	.415	.939	1.3	.8	.6	—	10.4	8.9
2019–20	Berlin	22	**15**	24.7	.466	**.466**	.813	2.0	**.9**	**.7**	**.2**	11.2	10.7
2020–21	Berlin	22	14	23.3	**.487**	.443	**.943**	1.7	.7	.5	—	12.4	10.7
2021–22	Berlin	13	13	**24.8**	.464	.430	.929	**2.3**	.8	.2	—	**12.5**	**11.0**
Career		111	51	19.5	.453	.431	.906	1.6	.7	.5	.1	9.3	8.1

=== Domestic Leagues ===
Season	Team	League	GP	MPG	FG%	3P%	FT%	RPG	APG	SPG	BPG	PPG
2010-11	Assignia Manresa	Liga ACB	4	1.2	.000	.000	.000	.3	.0	.0	.0	.0
2011-12	FC Barcelona	Liga ACB	0	.0	.000	.000	.000	.0	.0	.0	.0	.0
2012-13	FC Barcelona	Liga ACB	2	.1	.000	.000	.000	.0	.0	.0	.0	.0
2013-14	Assignia Manresa	Liga ACB	33	23.9	.460	.375	.941	1.8	.8	.4	.2	11.2
2014-15	FC Barcelona	Liga ACB	1	4.7	.000	.000	.000	.0	.0	.0	.0	.0
2015-16	FC Barcelona	Liga ACB	24	9.3	.591	.340	.556	1.1	.4	.4	.0	3.4
