= Livadeia B.C. =

A.E. Leivadeias
- Leagues: Greek A2 League; Greek Cup
- Founded: 1994
- History: 1994 – 2016
- Arena: Livadeia Indoor Hall
- Capacity: 1,500
- Location: Livadeia, Greece
- Team colors: Blue and Orange and black and White
- President: Nikos Kafritsas
- Head coach: Savvas Katsounis

Livadeia B.C. (alternate spellings: Livadia) was a Greek professional basketball club. The club was located in Livadeia, Greece. The team competed in the Greek 2nd Division. The club was also commonly known as A.E. Leivadeias, or A.E.L.

== History ==
The A.E. Livadeia parent sports athletic association was founded in 1994. The sport club's basketball department, Livadeia B.C., was founded in 1994. In 2013, the club returned to the Greek B League (Betta Ethniki), and the next season, it was promoted for the first time to the Greek 2nd Division.

In 2016, the club was merged with Holargos.

== Notable players ==
Note: Flags indicate national team eligibility at FIBA-sanctioned events. Players may hold other non-FIBA nationalities not displayed.

Criteria

To appear in this section a player must have either:

- Set a club record or won an individual award while at the club
- Played at least one official international match for their national team at any time
- Played at least one official NBA match at any time.

- Giannis Giannopoulos
- Ioannis Gagaloudis

== Head coaches ==
- Nikos Oikonomou
