= Jordan Barnett (basketball) =

American basketball player (born 1995)

No. 33 – Kolossos Rodou
- Position: Power forward / small forward
- League: Greek Basket League

Personal information
- Born: December 31, 1995 (age 30) St. Louis, Missouri, U.S.
- Listed height: 6 ft 7 in (2.01 m)
- Listed weight: 215 lb (98 kg)

Career information
- High school: Christian Brothers College (St. Louis, Missouri)
- College: Texas (2014–2016); Missouri (2016–2018)
- NBA draft: 2018: undrafted
- Playing career: 2018–present

Career history
- 2018–2019: Wisconsin Herd
- 2019: Fort Wayne Mad Ants
- 2019–2020: Gießen 46ers
- 2020–2021: SC Rasta Vechta
- 2021–2022: ZTE KK
- 2022–2023: Soproni KC
- 2023–2024: Alba Fehervar
- 2024–2025: Hamburg Towers
- 2025–2026: JDA Dijon
- 2026–present: Kolossos H Hotels

Career highlights
- Mr. Show-Me Basketball (2014)
- Stats at Basketball Reference

Jordan Kahlil Barnett (born December 31, 1995) is an American basketball player for Kolossos Rodou of the Greek Basketball League. He played college basketball for the Missouri Tigers and the Texas Longhorns.

== High school career ==
Barnett attended Christian Brothers College High School. As a junior, Barnett posted 17.1 points, 7.7 rebounds, 2.1 assists, 1.4 steals and 1.7 blocks per game. He averaged 20.8 points and 8.2 rebounds as a senior and led the team to the Missouri Class 5 state title. In Nike EYBL circuit, he played under coach Corey Tate with the St. Louis Eagles. Barnett scored 43 points and collected 20 rebounds in an 86–77 overtime win against Columbia-Hickman in the championship game. He was the 70th ranked player in his high school class according to Rivals.com.

== College career ==
Barnett began his collegiate career at Texas. He averaged 3.3 points and 2.0 rebounds in four games as a sophomore before deciding to transfer. Barnett selected Missouri because he was excited to play for Kim Anderson. He averaged 12.2 points per game in 23 games as a junior but was unable to save Anderson's job. After Michael Porter Jr. was forced to miss much of the 2017–18 season, Barnett was forced to shoulder much of the scoring alongside Kassius Robertson. Barnett scored a career-high 28 points in a 77–75 loss to Florida on January 6, 2018. As a senior, Barnett averaged 13.7 points and 5.7 rebounds per game and was one of the top 3-point shooters in the SEC at 41.4 percent. He was arrested for a DWI on March 13, and missed the Tigers' loss to Florida State in the Round of 64 of the NCAA Tournament.

== Professional career ==
After going undrafted in the 2018 NBA draft, Barnett signed with the Milwaukee Bucks in the NBA Summer League. In 18.6 minutes per game, he averaged 6.0 points, 3.6 rebounds and 1.6 assists per game in summer league. On August 8, 2018, he signed with the Bucks for training camp. On September 17, 2018, Barnett was waived by the Bucks. Barnett was added to the opening night roster of the Wisconsin Herd on November 1, 2018.

On January 22, 2019, the Fort Wayne Mad Ants announced that they had acquired Barnett and Ike Nwamu from the Wisconsin Herd for Elijah Stewart and the returning player rights to Alex Hamilton.

On July 30, 2019, Barnett signed with the Gießen 46ers of the Basketball Bundesliga. He averaged 10.4 points, 3.4 rebounds, and 1.0 blocks per game.

On July 22, 2020, Barnett signed with Rasta Vechta of the Basketball Bundesliga. He averaged 8.3 points, 2.9 rebounds and 1.0 assist per game. On July 22, 2021, Barnett signed with ZTE of the Hungarian Nemzeti Bajnokság I/A.

In the 2023–2024 season, Barnett played during the regular season and playoffs for Alba Fehervar in the Hungary-A Division.

In the 2024–2025 season, Barnett will play for the Hamburg Towers in the German Bundesliga.

On June 17, 2025, he signed with JDA Dijon of the LNB Pro A.
