= Marko Pajić =

Slovenian basketball player

Personal information
- Born: October 13, 1992 (age 34) Ljubljana, Slovenia
- Listed height: 2.04 m (6 ft 8 in)
- Listed weight: 104 kg (229 lb)

Career information
- Playing career: 2007–2023

Career history

Playing
- 2007–2012: Geoplin Slovan
- 2009–2010: → Triglav Kranj
- 2012–2014: Krka
- 2016: Tajfun Šentjur
- 2016-2017: Šenčur
- 2017 - 2019: Rogaška
- 2019: Balkan
- 2019 - 2020: Triglav Kranj
- 2020-2023: KK Ilirija

Coaching
- 2023–2024: KK Komenda
- 2024–2025: ZKK Triglav Kranj (assistant)

Career highlights
- Slovenian SKL All-Star (2012); Slovenian League Rookie of the year (2012); Slovenian Champion (2013,2014); Slovenian Cup Winner (2014); Slovenian Supercup (2013); Slovenian Second League (2020,2021)

Marko Pajić (born October 13, 1992) is a former Slovenian professional basketball player last played for KK Ilirija of the Slovenian First League and Alpe Adria Cup. He is a 2.04 m (6 ft 8 in) tall and he played at the position of power forward.

== Professional career ==
In 2014, he signed for MZT Skopje but due to a back injury before the start of season 2014/2015, he terminated the contract with the Macedonian champion MZT Skopje.

He was a member of the Slovenia U18 team and Slovenia U20 team that played in Fiba Europe Under-18 and Under-20 Championship.
