= Aris Lykogiannis =

Greek basketball coach

Kolossos Rodou
- Position: Head coach
- League: GBL

Personal information
- Born: 10 April 1969 (age 57) Athens, Greece
- Coaching career: 2001–present

Career history

Coaching
- 2001–2004: Sporting (assistant)
- 2004–2006: Sporting
- 2006–2008: Pagrati
- 2008–2009: Sporting
- 2009–2012: Ikaros Kallitheas
- 2012–2013: Solna Vikings
- 2013–2014: Ikaros Chalkidas
- 2014–2015: Kolossos Rodou
- 2015: Panathinaikos (assistant)
- 2015–2018: Kolossos Rodou
- 2018–2019: Holargos
- 2019–2020: Kolossos Rodou
- 2020–2023: PAOK
- 2023–2025: Panionios
- 2025: Śląsk Wrocław
- 2025: Elitzur Yavne
- 2026–present: Kolossos Rodou

Career highlights
- 2× Greek 2nd Division champion (2010, 2024)

Aris Lykogiannis (Greek: Άρης Λυκογιάννης; born 10 April 1969) is a Greek professional basketball coach for Kolossos Rodou of the Greek Basketball League.

== Coaching career ==
He coached Ikaros Kallitheas from 2009 to 2012. With Ikaros, Lykogiannis won the Greek 2nd Division championship in 2010. He was the coach of Kolossos Rodou of the Greek League from 2014 to 2018. During that time, he also became for a short period of time the assistant coach for Panathinaikos in 2015.

In 2018, he became the head coach of the newly promoted to the Greek Basket League club Holargos. He returned once more to Kolossos Rodou for the 2019–2020 season, but parted ways with them on 3 August 2020.

On 10 December 2020 Lykogiannis was appointed as the new head coach of PAOK.

On April 8, 2025, he signed with Śląsk Wrocław of the Polish Basketball League (PLK).

On November 7, 2025, Lykogiannis was appointed from Elitzur Yavne of the Ligat HaAl. He left the team on December 21, 2025. On January 2, 2026, he returned to Kolossos Rodou for a fourth stint.

== Awards and accomplishments ==
=== Pro clubs ===
- Greek 2nd Division champion: (2010)
