= Vyacheslav Motorchuk =

Ukrainian basketball player

Vjaczeslav Motorczuk
No. 17 – Budivelnyk Kyiv
- Position: Power forward
- League: UA SuperLeague; Euroleague

Personal information
- Born: 9 February 1992 (age 34) Odesa, Ukraine
- Listed height: 6 ft 9 in (2.06 m)

Career information
- NBA draft: 2014: undrafted
- Playing career: 2008–present

Career history
- 2008–2012: Khimik
- 2012–2013: Politekhnika-Halychyna
- 2013–2014: Luchesk
- 2014–2015: Odesa
- 2015–present: Budivelnyk

Vjaczeslav Motorczuk (born February 9, 1992) is a Ukrainian professional basketball player for Budivelnyk Kyiv of the UA SuperLeague.

September 13, 2015 signed a contract with BC Budivelnyk
