= Şafak Edge =

Turkish basketball player (born 1992)

No. 10 – Bandırma Bordo
- Position: Point guard
- League: Türkiye Basketbol Ligi

Personal information
- Born: June 17, 1992 (age 34) Balıkesir, Turkey
- Listed height: 6 ft 1 in (1.85 m)
- Listed weight: 186 lb (84 kg)

Career information
- NBA draft: 2012: undrafted
- Playing career: 2009–present

Career history
- 2009–2010: Bandırma Kırmızı
- 2010–2011: Banvit
- 2011–2012: Bandırma Kırmızı
- 2012–2015: Banvit
- 2015–2016: Galatasaray
- 2016–2017: Beşiktaş
- 2017–2018: Uşak Sportif
- 2018–2019: Sakarya BB
- 2019–2020: Türk Telekom
- 2020–2022: Balıkesir Büyükşehir Belediyespor
- 2022: HDI Sigorta Afyon Belediye
- 2022–2023: Final Gençlik
- 2024–present: Bandırma Bordo

Career highlights
- EuroCup champion (2016)

Şafak Edge (born June 17, 1992) is a Turkish professional basketball player for Bandırma Bordo of the Türkiye Basketbol Ligi.
