= Christos Saloustros =

Greek basketball player (born 1990)

Christos Saloustros Χρήστος Σαλούστρος
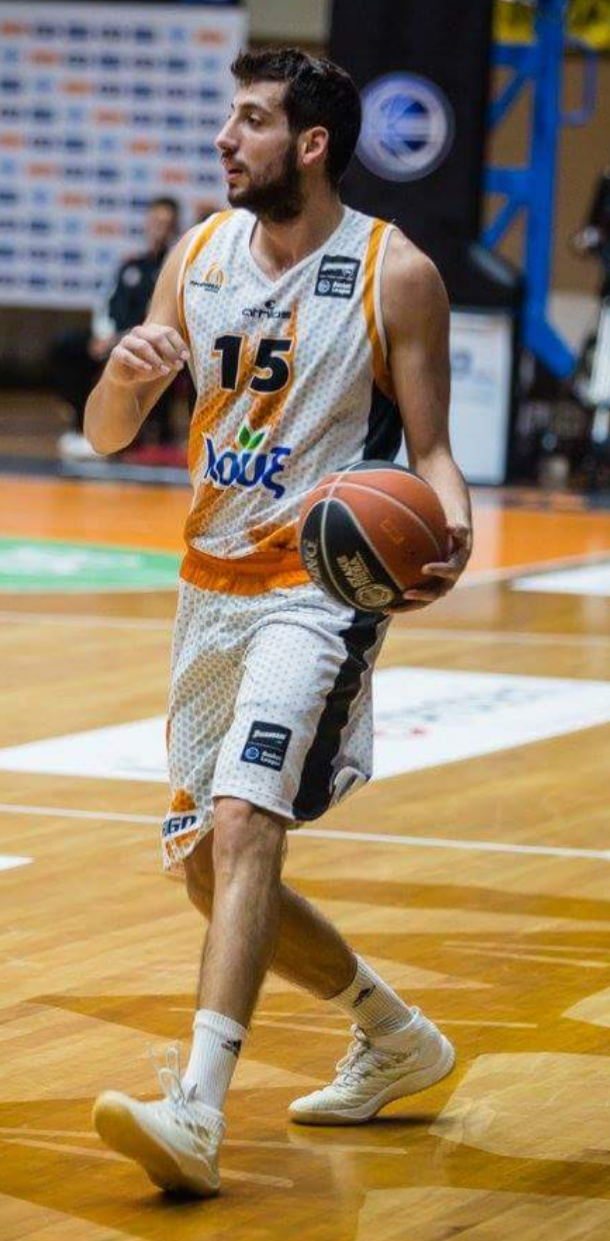
- Saloustros with Promitheas, in 2017.

Free agent
- Position: Small forward

Personal information
- Born: March 29, 1990 (age 36) Heraklion, Greece
- Listed height: 6 ft 7.5 in (2.02 m)
- Listed weight: 205 lb (93 kg)

Career information
- Playing career: 2012–2025

Career history
- 2012–2013: Filathlitikos
- 2013–2014: Panionios
- 2014–2015: PAOK
- 2015–2017: Kolossos Rodou
- 2017–2019: Promitheas Patras
- 2019–2022: Peristeri
- 2022–2023: PAOK
- 2023–2024: Apollon Patras
- 2024–2025: Panionios

Career highlights
- Greek League Most Improved Player (2018)

Christos "Chris" Saloustros (Greek: Χρήστος Σαλούστρος; born March 29, 1990) is a Greek former professional basketball player. Standing at 2.02 m (6 ft 7 1/2 in) tall, he played at the small forward position.

== Professional career ==
Saloustros played with the youth teams of Filathlitikos, and then with the senior men's team of Filathlitikos, in the Greek lower minor league divisions. He played with Filathlitikos in the Greek 4th Division, in the 2010–11 season, and in the Greek 3rd Division, in the 2011–12 season. Saloustros then started his pro career with Filathlitikos, in the Greek 2nd Division, in the 2012–13 season. He then moved to the top-tier level Greek League club Panionios, where he also played in the EuroCup. He joined the Greek EuroCup club PAOK, in 2014.

In 2015, he moved to the Greek club Kolossos Rodou. After two years, he left the club, and on June 10, 2017, he joined Promitheas Patras of the Greek Basket League. He was named the Greek League's Most Improved Player in 2018.

Saloustros joined the Greek Basket League and BCL club Peristeri in 2019. On July 2, 2020, he officially re-upped his contract with Peristeri. On July 29, 2021, Saloustros renewed for a third season with the club and was subsequently named team captain. During the 2021-22 campaign, in a total of 22 games, he averaged 5.2 points and 3.3 rebounds, playing around 16 minutes per contest. On July 14, 2022, Saloustros parted ways with Peristeri.

On August 24, 2022, Saloustros returned to PAOK after seven years for a second stint. In 26 league games, he averaged 5.4 points, 5.2 rebounds and 1.3 assists in 20 minutes per contest.

On July 23, 2023, Saloustros returned to Patras for Apollon. In 23 games, he averaged 5.1 points, 3.7 rebounds and 2.2 assists in 25 minutes of play. He retired from professional basketball on 2025.

== National team career ==
Saloustros became a member of the senior men's Greek national basketball team in 2017. He played at the 2019 FIBA World Cup qualification.
