= Michalis Kamperidis =

Greek basketball player (born 1994)

Vikos Falcons
- Position: Power forward / center
- League: Greek Elite League

Personal information
- Born: April 24, 1994 (age 32) Athens, Greece
- Listed height: 6 ft 9 in (2.06 m)
- Listed weight: 240 lb (109 kg)

Career information
- NBA draft: 2014: undrafted
- Playing career: 2012–present

Career history
- 2012–2014: Filathlitikos
- 2014–2018: AEK Athens
- 2015: → Peñas Huesca
- 2015–2017: → Rethymno Cretan Kings
- 2018–2019: Holargos
- 2019–2020: Rethymno Cretan Kings
- 2020–2021: Larisa
- 2021–2022: PAOK Thessaloniki
- 2022–2023: Triton Sepolia
- 2023–2024: Partenope Napoli
- 2024–2025: Eleftheroupoli
- 2025–present: Vikos Falcons

Career highlights
- FIBA Champions League champion (2018); Greek Cup winner (2018)

Michalis Kamperidis (alternate spelling: Michail) (Greek: Μιχάλης Καμπερίδης; born April 24, 1994) is a Greek professional basketball player for Vikos Falcons Ioannina of the Greek Elite League. He is a 2.06 m (6 ft 9 in) tall power forward, that can also play as a center.

== Professional career ==
After playing youth basketball with Mandraikos, Kamperidis played semi-pro basketball in the Greek 3rd Division, with the Greek club Filathlitikos, in the 2011–12 season. He then began his professional career in the 2012–13 season, with Filathlitikos, playing in the Greek 2nd Division. He declared for the 2014 NBA draft, but went undrafted. In 2014, he moved to the Greek First Division club AEK Athens.

On 22 January 2015, he was loaned to the Spanish 2nd Division club Peñas Huesca. On 29 July 2015, he was loaned to the Greek club Rethymno Cretan Kings, where he spent two seasons. With AEK, he won the Greek Cup title, in 2018, as well as the FIBA Champions League's 2018 championship.

He moved to the Greek club Holargos in 2018. On June 4, 2019, Kamperidis returned to the Rethymno Cretan Kings, signing a two-year contract. He averaged 4.9 points and 3.1 rebounds per game. On August 26, 2020, Kamperidis signed with Larisa.

On August 2, 2021, Kamperidis signed with PAOK, joining his younger brother Georgios. On January 31, 2022, he mutually parted ways with the club.

== National team career ==
As a member of the junior national basketball teams of Greece, Kamperidis participated at the 2011 FIBA Europe Under-18 Championship, the 2012 FIBA Europe Under-18 Championship, the 2013 FIBA Europe Under-20 Championship, and the 2014 FIBA Europe Under-20 Championship.

== Personal life ==
Kamperidis' younger brother, Georgios, is also a professional basketball player. Kamperidis has been one of the best point guards on the European 2K Pro Am scene. He has been the leader of Paladins Gaming and member of Rethymno Cretan Kings eSports. In January 2019, he decided to launch his NBA 2K career, and he reached an overall player rating of 99, with his sharpshooting play-maker player. In 2020 Kamperidis decided to move again on Rethymno Cretan Kings eSports.
