= EFAO Zografou B.C. =

E.F.A.O. Zografou
- Leagues: Greek B Basket League
- Founded: 1986; 40 years ago
- History: Filathlitikos A.O. Zografou B.C. (FAOZ) (1986–2016); Filathlitikos O.A. Zografou B.C. (FOAZ) (2016–2018); EFAO Zografou B.C. (EFAOZ) (2018–present)
- Arena: Zografou AntetokounBros Municipal Gymnasium
- Location: Zografou, Athens, Greece
- Team colors: Red and white
- President: Giorgos Pipiliagkas
- Website: efaoz.gr
Home	Away

EFAO Zografou B.C. (Greek: ΕΦΑΟ Ζωγράφου K.A.E.), abbreviated as EFAOZ B.C. (ΕΦΑΟΖ K.A.E.), is a Greek professional basketball club based in Zografou, Athens. The club's full name is Enosi Filathlitikou Athlitikou Omilou Zografou (Ένωση Φιλαθλητικού Αθλητικού Ομίλου Ζωγράφου), which means Union of Philathletic Athletic Group of Zografou. The club is also commonly known as Filathlitikos B.C. The team's colors are red and white.

The club is mostly known for being the first club that Giannis Antetokounmpo played for, prior to his being selected in the 2013 NBA draft, and playing in the National Basketball Association (NBA), as well as for being the club that the eldest Antetokounmpo brothers (Thanasis, and Giannis), played with. The youngest Antetokounmpo brothers, Kostas and Alex, also played with the club's youth teams.

== History ==
In 1954, the basketball section of Omilos Athlitikos Zografou (Ομίλου Αθλητικού Ζωγράφου), or O.A. Zografou, was created. Filathlitikos Athlitikos Omilos Zografou B.C. (Φιλαθλητικός Αθλητικός Όμιλος Ζωγράφου K.A.E.), or Filathlitikos A.O. Zografou (FAOZ), was founded in 1986. Filathlitikos competed in the second tier level of Greek basketball, the Greek A2 Basket League, for the first time, during the 2012–13 season. During that season, Filathlitikos featured players like the Antetokounmpo brothers, Giannis and Thanasis, as well as players like Nikos Gkikas, Michalis Kamperidis, and Christos Saloustros, guided by head coach Takis Zivas. They finished in third place in the A2 League that season.

During the 2013–14 season, Filathlitikos finished in twelfth place in the league, and they were relegated back down to the third tier level of Greek basketball, the Greek B Basket League. In 2016, Filathlitikos merged with O.A. Zografou (Ο.A. Ζωγράφου), to form the newly named club of Filathlitikos Omilos Athlitikos Zografou (Φιλαθλητικός Όμιλος Αθλητικός Ζωγράφου), abbreviated as FOAZ (ΦΟΑΖ). In 2018, the club changed its name to Enosi Filathlitikos Athlitikos Omilos Zografou (Ένωση Φιλαθλητικού Αθλητικού Ομίλου Ζωγράφου), abbreviated as EFAOZ (ΕΦΑΟΖ), and meaning Union of Philathletic Athletic Group of Zografou.

== Arena ==
EFAO Zografou plays its home games at the Zografou AntetokounBros Municipal Gymnasium, which is located in Zografou, a suburb of Athens. In 2019, the arena was named after the Antetokounmpo brothers (Francis, Thanasis, Giannis, Kostas, and Alex), all of whom played with the club at various times, whether in the senior men's team, or in the club's youth teams.

== Season-by-season ==
Season	Tier	Division	Pos.	W–L	Greek Cup	European competitions
2010–11	4	C Basket League	1st	24–2		
2011–12	3	B Basket League	2nd	25–5		
2012–13	2	A2 Basket League	3rd	21–5		
2013–14	2	A2 Basket League	12th	10–16		
2014–15	3	B Basket League	8th	12–14		
2015–16	3	B Basket League	9th	15–15		
2016–17	3	B Basket League	10th	15–15		
2017–18	3	B Basket League	15th	9–21		
2018–19	4	C Basket League	5th	16–10		
2019–20	4	C Basket League	1st	12–5		

== Logos ==
The club's Filathlitikos A.O Zografou B.C. (FAOZ) logo (1986–2016)

The club's Filathlitikos O.A. Zografou B.C. (FOAZ) logo (2016–2018)

The club's EFAO Zografou B.C. (EFOAZ) logo (2018–present)

== Notable players ==
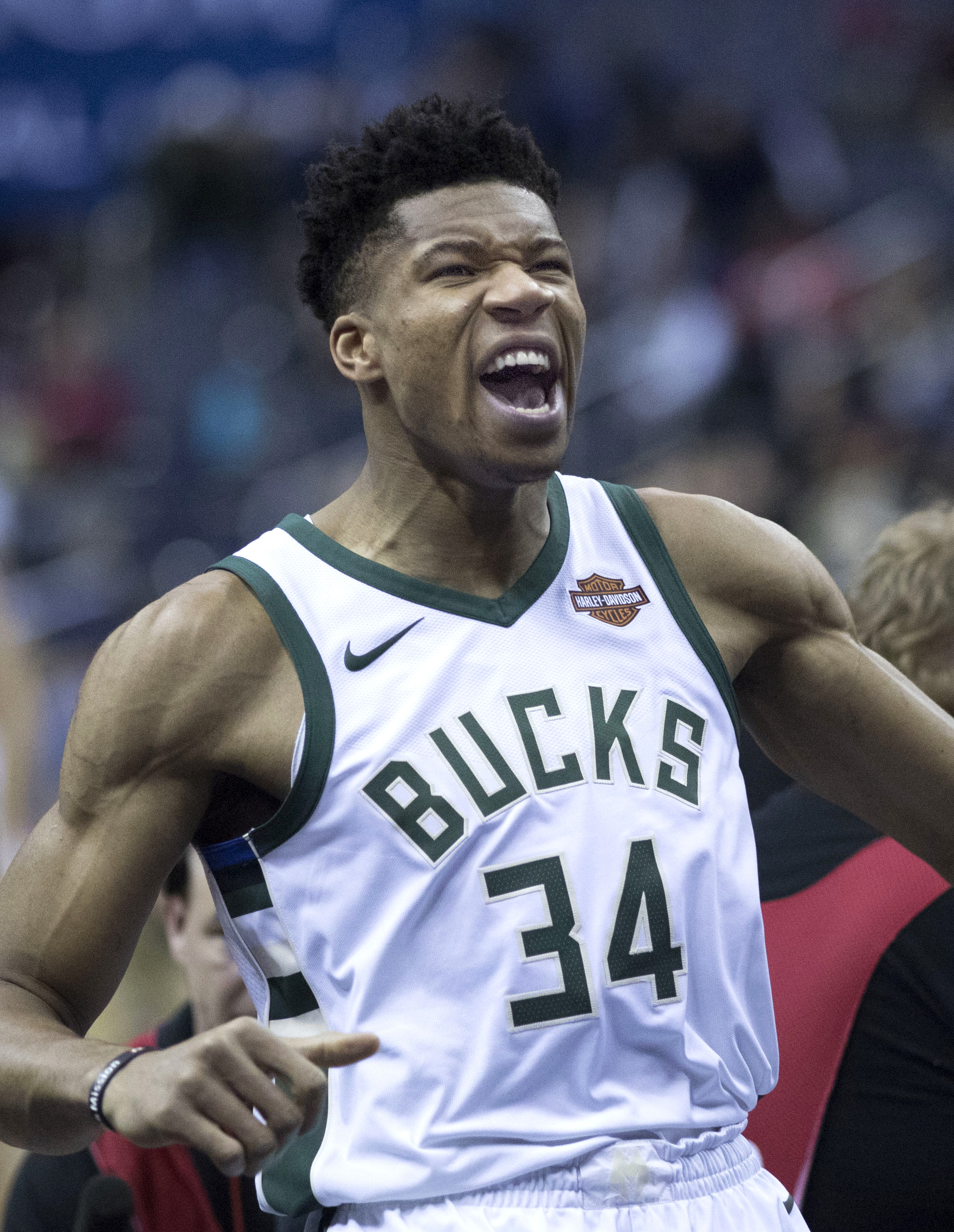
Giannis Antetokounmpo

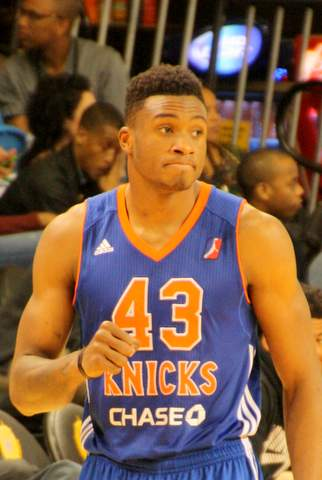
Thanasis Antetokounmpo

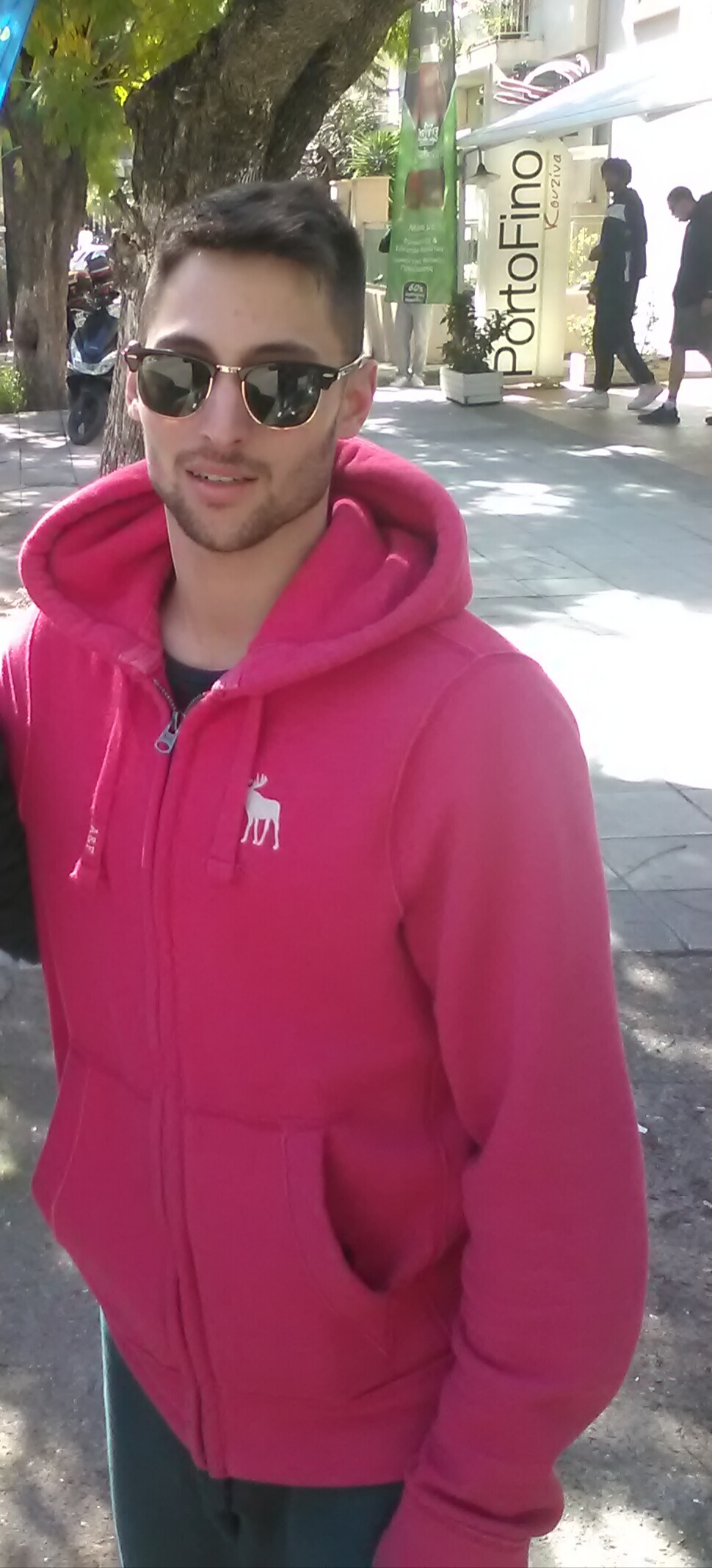
Nikos Gkikas

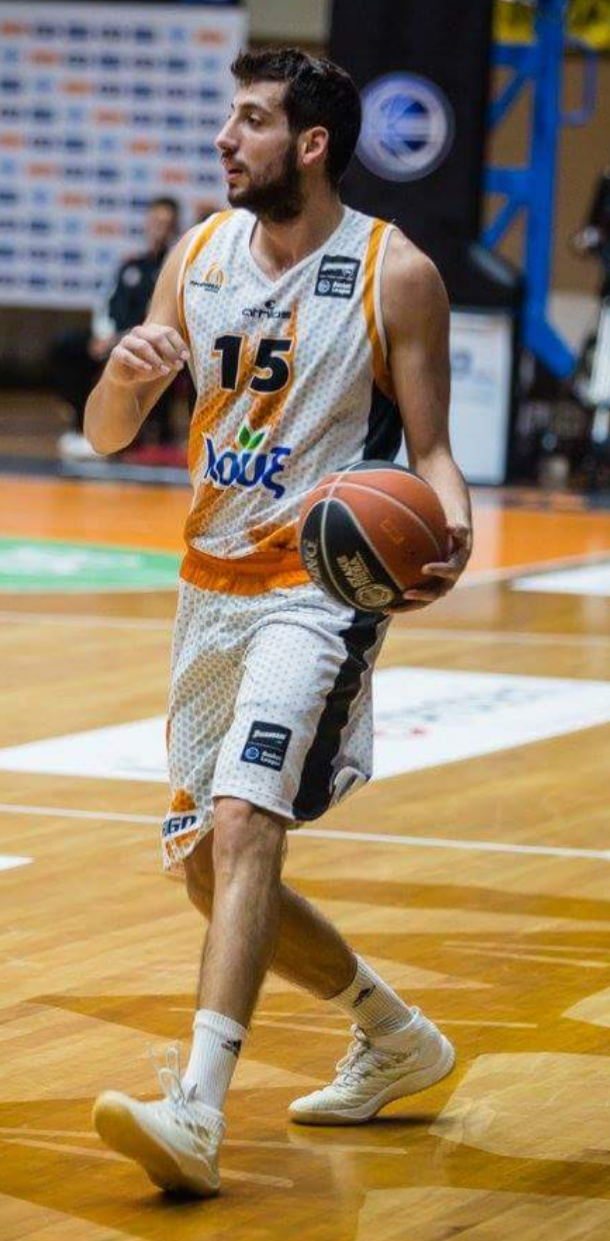
Christos Saloustros

Note: Flags indicate national team eligibility at FIBA-sanctioned events. Players may hold other non-FIBA nationalities not displayed.

Criteria

To appear in this section a player must have either:

- Set a club record or won an individual award while at the club
- Played at least one official international match for their national team at any time
- Played at least one official NBA match at any time.

=== Senior club players ===
- (Greece) Giannis Antetokounmpo
- (Greece) Thanasis Antetokounmpo
- (Greece) Nikos Gkikas
- (Greece) Michalis Kamperidis
- (Greece) Spyros Magkounis
- (Greece) Christos Saloustros

=== Junior club players ===
- (Greece) Alex Antetokounmpo
- (Greece) Kostas Antetokounmpo

== Head coaches ==
- (Greece) Takis Zivas
