= 2013–14 Panionios B.C. season =

Panionios
- League: 2013–14 Greek League
- Arena: Nea Smyrni Indoor Hall; Hellinicon Olympic Arena
- Capacity: 2,000; 15,000
- Location: Nea Smyrni, Athens, Greece
- President: Elias Lianos
- Head coach: Ioannis Sfairopoulos
- Website: panioniosbc.gr

During the 2013–14 Panionios B.C. season, the Panionios professional basketball team of Nea Smyrni, Athens, was captained by Gaios Skordilis and coached by Ioannis Sfairopoulos. The team won 18 games and lost 8, in the regular season of the Greek Basketball League, and also reached the semifinals of the Greek Cup.

== Roster ==
Note: Flags indicate national team eligibility at FIBA-sanctioned events. Players may hold other non-FIBA nationalities not displayed.

Panionios Nea Smyrni B.C. roster
Players
Coaches

Pos.	No.	Nat.	Name	Ht.	Wt.	Age
PG	4	(United States)	McCollum, Errick	1.88 m (6 ft 2 in)
PG	5	(Greece)	Stamatis, Dimitrios	1.92 m (6 ft 4 in)
SG	6	(Greece)	Motsenigos, Spyros	1.94 m (6 ft 4 in)
SG	7	(Serbia)	Duvnjak, Uroš	1.90 m (6 ft 3 in)
SG	8	(United States)	Carter, T. J.	1.92 m (6 ft 4 in)
PF	9	(United States)	Milbourne, Landon	2.01 m (6 ft 7 in)
F	10	(Greece)	Athanasoulas, Ioannis	2.02 m (6 ft 8 in)
PG	11	(Greece)	Batis, Marios	1.91 m (6 ft 3 in)
C	12	(Greece)	Skordilis, Gaios	2.08 m (6 ft 10 in)
F	14	(Greece)	Spyropoulos, Tasos	2.08 m (6 ft 10 in)
F/C	15	(United States)	Langford, Kevin	2.04 m (6 ft 8 in)
C	16	(France)	Michel, Guy-Marc	2.16 m (7 ft 1 in)
F/C	17	(Greece)	Symtsak, Vassilis	2.07 m (6 ft 9 in)
SF	18	(Greece)	Kyritsis, Alexis	1.98 m (6 ft 6 in)
SF	19	(Greece)	Saloustros, Christos	2.01 m (6 ft 7 in)

Head coach

- (Greece) Ioannis Sfairopoulos

Assistant coach(es)

- (Greece) Thanasis Koufos
- (Greece) Vassilis Geragotelis

Legend

- (C) Team captain
- Injured

- Roster
Updated: 2013-10-11

== Depth chart ==
Pos.	Starting 5	Bench 1	Bench 2	Reserve
C	Kevin Langford	Gaios Skordilis	Guy-Marc Michel
PF	Landon Milbourne	Ioannis Athanasoulas	Vassilis Symtsak
SF	Christos Saloustros	Alexis Kyritsis		Tasos Spyropoulos
SG	T. J. Carter	Uroš Duvnjak		Spyros Motsenigos
PG	Errick McCollum	Marios Batis		Dimitrios Stamatis

== Transfers 2013 ==
=== In ===
Note: Flags indicate national team, as has been defined under FIBA eligibility rules. Players may hold more than one non-FIBA nationality.

No.	Pos.	Nat.	Player
	PG	(United States) USA	Errick McCollum (from (Greece) Apollon Patras)
	SG	(Serbia) SRB	Uroš Duvnjak (from (Greece) Rethymno Aegean)
	SG	(United States) USA	T. J. Carter (from (Greece) Rethymno Aegean)
	PG	(Greece) GRE	Dimitrios Stamatis (from (Greece) Evriali Glifadas)
	SF	(Greece) GRE	Christos Saloustros (from (Greece) Filathlitikos)
	C	(France) FRA	Guy-Marc Michel (from (Greece) KAOD)
	C	(Greece) GRE	Vassilis Symtsak (from (Greece) Ikaros Chalkidas)
	SF	(Greece) GRE	Tasos Spyropoulos (from (Greece) PAOK)
	PF	(United States) USA	Kevin Langford (from (Greece) Kolossos Rodou)
	C	(Greece) GRE	Gaios Skordilis (from (Greece) Panathinaikos)
	SG	(Greece) GRE	Alexis Kyritsis (from (Greece) Ikaros Chalkidas)

=== Out ===
Note: Flags indicate national team, as has been defined under FIBA eligibility rules. Players may hold more than one non-FIBA nationality.

No.	Pos.	Nat.	Player
	SG	(Greece) GRE	Nikos Pappas (to (Greece) Panathinaikos)
	SF	(Greece) GRE	Vlado Janković (to (Greece) Panathinaikos)
	SG	(Greece) GRE	Ioannis Athinaiou (to (Greece) Aris)
	C	(Greece) GRE	Georgios Bogris (to (Greece) PAOK)
	C	(United States) USA	Chris Booker (to (Slovenia) Krka Novo Mesto)
	PG	(United States) USA	Billy Keys (to (Finland) Nilan Bisons)
	PF	(Greece) GRE	Dimitrios Agravanis (to (Greece) Olympiacos)
	SF	(United States) USA	Mark Payne (to (Greece) PAOK)
	C	(Greece) GRE	Vassilis Kavvadas (to (Greece) Olympiacos)

== Matches ==
=== Greek Basketball League ===
==== Results summary ====
Wins
18
Defeats
8

First Round

13 October 2013 1	Panelefsiniakos	72–74	Panionios	Elefsina

19 October 2013 2	Panionios	69–62	Trikala	Nea Smyrni

19 October 2013

KAO Dramas	76–63	Panionios
Scoring by quarter: 15-14, 15-21, 24-11, 22-17

Drama Indoor Hall, Drama
Referees: Anastopoulos-Somos-Tzafleris

2 November 2013

Panionios	64–39	Nea Kifisia
Scoring by quarter: 15-10, 14-11, 25-11, 10-7

Nea Smyrni Indoor Hall, Nea Smyrni
Referees: Schinas-Papapetrou-Poursanidis

10 November 2013

Aris	63–65	Panionios
Scoring by quarter: 16-11, 13-9, 18-24, 16-21

Nick Galis Hall, Thessaloniki

17 November 2013

Panathinaikos	90–65	Panionios
Scoring by quarter: 22-16, 18-20, 14-10, 26-21

OAKA Indoor Hall, Marousi

23 November 2013

Panionios	69–64	Ilysiakos
Scoring by quarter: 18-23, 14-14, 20-19, 17-8

Nea Smyrni Indoor Hall, Nea Smyrni

30 November 2013

Ikaros Chalkidas	73–80	Panionios
Scoring by quarter: 15-17, 15-23, 18-13, 25-27

Kanithou Indoor Hall, Chalkida

7 December 2013

Panionios	73–66	Kolossos Rodou
Scoring by quarter: 24-18, 15-12, 18-19, 16-17

Nea Smyrni Indoor Hall, Nea Smyrni

14 December 2013

PAOK	91–100	Panionios
Scoring by quarter: 13-26, 23-22, 22-21, 33-31

P.A.O.K. Sports Arena, Pylaia

28 December 2013
18:30

Panionios	74–66	Rethymno Aegean
Scoring by quarter: 21-19, 18-9, 27-25, 8-13

Nea Smyrni Indoor Hall, Nea Smyrni
Referees: Foufid-Stamatopoulos-Tsonos

4 January 2014

Apollon Patras	vs.	Panionios
Scoring by quarter: 18-19, 25-31

Apollon Patras Indoor Hall, Patras
Referees: Godas-Manos-Pantelidis

12 January 2014

Panionios	vs.	Olympiacos

Nea Smyrni Indoor Hall, Nea Smyrni

Second Round

=== Greek Basketball Cup ===
Quarter-Finals

9 October 2013

Panionios	82–65	Kolossos Rodou
Scoring by quarter: 27-17, 21-14, 14-21, 20-13

Nea Smyrni Indoor Hall, Nea Smyrni

Semi-Finals

Aris	88–79	Panionios
Scoring by quarter: 34-11, 16-19, 20-26, 18-23
Pts: Errick McCollum 31		Pts: Aleksandar Vezenkov 24

Nick Galis Hall, Thessaloniki

=== Eurocup Basketball ===
Regular Season

16 October 2013

Summary

(Greece) Panionios	77–72	(Serbia) Radnički Kragujevac
Scoring by quarter: 27-17, 21-14, 14-21, 20-13

Hellinicon Olympic Arena, Athens

23 October 2013

Summary

(Russia) Spartak Saint Petersburg	68–69	(Greece) Panionios
Scoring by quarter: 13-22, 20-13, 19-13, 16-21

Yubileyny Sports Palace, Moscow

30 October 2013

Summary

(Greece) Panionios	86–91	(Lithuania) Neptūnas
Scoring by quarter: 18-21, 25-23, 29-21, 14-26

Hellinicon Olympic Arena, Athens

6 November 2013
20:00

Summary

(Turkey) Beşiktaş	71–57	(Greece) Panionios
Scoring by quarter: 21-15, 15-16, 12-16, 23-10

BJK Akatlar Arena, Istanbul
Referees: Radovic-Juras-Lanzarini

13 November 2013

Summary

(Greece) Panionios	74–62	(Finland) Bisons Loimaa
Scoring by quarter: 15-20, 23-12, 18-13, 18-17

Hellinicon Olympic Arena, Athens

20 November 2013

Summary

(Serbia) Radnički Kragujevac	84–77	(Greece) Panionios
Scoring by quarter: 20-17, 21-18, 27-15, 16-27

Jezero Hall, Kragujevac
Referees: Kowalski (POL), Arana (ESP), Esteron (ISR)

27 November 2013

Summary

(Greece) Panionios	76–69	(Russia) Spartak Saint Petersburg
Scoring by quarter: 22-11, 17-16, 12-24, 25-18

Hellinicon Olympic Arena, Athens
Referees: Lamonica (ITA), Petek (SLO), Olaru (ROM)

4 December 2013

Summary

(Lithuania) Neptūnas	78–86	(Greece) Panionios
Scoring by quarter: 17-25, 16-16, 22-20, 23-25

Švyturys Arena, Klaipėda
Referees: Garcia Ortiz, Jose Ramon (ESP), Shulga Boris (UKR), Ozols Arnis (LAT)

11 December 2013

Summary

(Greece) Panionios	77–67	(Turkey) Beşiktaş
Scoring by quarter: 23-14, 15-18, 14-19, 25-16

Hellinicon Olympic Arena, Athens
Referees: HIERREZUELO, DANI (ESP), ZAMOJSKI, JAKUB (POL), OVINOV, SEMEN (RUS)

18 December 2013

Summary

(Finland) Bisons Loimaa	93–89	(Greece) Panionios
Scoring by quarter: 19-16, 18-18, 30-24, 13-22

Energia Areena, Vantaa
Referees: CIULIN, MARIUS (ROM), CHEBYSHEV, SERGIY (UKR), SILVA, SERGIO (POR)

Last 32

8 January 2014

(Greece) Panionios	vs.	(Russia) Nizhny Novgorod

Hellinicon Olympic Arena, Athens

14 January 2014

(Spain) Bilbao	vs.	(Greece) Panionios

Bilbao Arena, Bilbao

22 January 2014

(Serbia) Crvena Zvezda	vs.	(Greece) Panionios

Pionir Hall, Belgrade

29 January 2014

(Greece) Panionios	vs.	(Serbia) Crvena Zvezda

Hellinicon Olympic Arena, Athens

12 February 2014

(Russia) Nizhny Novgorod	vs.	(Greece) Panionios

Trade Union Sport Palace, Nizhny Novgorod

19 February 2014

(Greece) Panionios	vs.	(Spain) Bilbao

Hellinicon Olympic Arena, Athens
