= 2008–09 Olympiacos B.C. season =

Olympiacos Piraeus B.C. 2008–09
Club season	2008–09
President	(Greece) Socratis Kokkalis
Vice-Presidents	(Greece) Panagiotis Angelopoulos (Greece) Giorgos Angelopoulos
Head coach	(Greece) Panagiotis Giannakis
Arena	Peace and Friendship Stadium (capacity: 14,905)

Olympiacos Piraeus B.C. 2008–2009 season was the 2008–09 basketball season for Greek professional basketball club Olympiacos.

The club competed in:

- 2008–09 Euroleague
- 2008–09 Greek Basket League
- Greek Basketball Cup

== Depth chart ==
Pos.	Starting 5	Bench 1	Bench 2	Reserve
C	Nikola Vujčić	Ioannis Bourousis	Sofoklis Schortsanitis	Ian Vougioukas
PF	Georgios Printezis	Zoran Erceg		Charalampos Giannopoulos
SF	Josh Childress	Panagiotis Vasilopoulos	Michalis Pelekanos	Ioannis Karathanasis
SG	Yotam Halperin	Lynn Greer		Kostas Sloukas
PG	Theodoros Papaloukas	Miloš Teodosić		Igor Milošević

== Squad changes for the 2008–09 season ==
In: Note: Flags indicate national team as defined under FIFA eligibility rules; some limited exceptions apply. Players may hold more than one non-FIFA nationality.

No.	Pos.	Nation	Player
7		(Croatia) CRO	Nikola Vujčić (from Maccabi Tel Aviv)
17		(Serbia) SRB	Zoran Erceg (from FMP Železnik)
4		(Greece) GRE	Theodoros Papaloukas (from CSKA Moscow)
10		(Israel) ISR	Yotam Halperin (from Maccabi Tel Aviv)
5		(Greece) GRE	Michalis Pelekanos (from Real Madrid)
6		(United States) USA	Josh Childress (from Atlanta Hawks)
8		(Greece) GRE	Igor Milošević (from Red Star)
20		(Greece) GRE	Ioannis Karathanasis (from Asteria)
12		(Greece) GRE	Charalampos Giannopoulos (from PAOK)
19		(Greece) GRE	Kostas Sloukas (from Mantoulidis)

Out: Note: Flags indicate national team as defined under FIFA eligibility rules; some limited exceptions apply. Players may hold more than one non-FIFA nationality.

No.	Pos.	Nation	Player
5		(Greece) GRE	Manolis Papamakarios (to Panellinios)
4		(United States) USA	Roderick Blakney (to Türk Telekomspor)
6		(United States) USA	Qyntel Woods (to UPIM Bologna)
14		(Greece) GRE	Kostas Vassiliadis (to PAOK)
17		(Greece) GRE	Panagiotis Kafkis (to PAOK)

Out on loan: Note: Flags indicate national team as defined under FIFA eligibility rules; some limited exceptions apply. Players may hold more than one non-FIFA nationality.

No.	Pos.	Nation	Player
12		(Greece) GRE	Loukas Mavrokefalides (to Maroussi)
8		(Lithuania) LTU	Renaldas Seibutis (to Iurbentia Bilbao)

== Results, schedules and standings ==
=== Euroleague 2008–09 ===
==== Regular season ====
Group A

	Team	Pld	W	L	PF	PA	Diff
1.	(Greece) Olympiacos	8	6	2	664	574	+90
2.	(Spain) Unicaja Málaga	7	5	2	530	485	+45
3.	(Croatia) Cibona Zagreb	8	5	3	609	616	−7
4.	(Israel) Maccabi Tel Aviv	7	4	3	563	563	0
5.	(Italy) Air Avellino	7	2	5	519	575	−56
6.	(France) Le Mans	7	0	7	504	576	−72

October 23
21:00 CET

(Report)

Air Avellino (Italy)	69–83	(Greece) Olympiacos
Scoring by quarter: 22-14, 12-26, 20-22, 15-21
Pts: Chris Warren 18; Rebs: Eric Williams 9 Asts: Best Travis 5		Pts: Josh Childress 14; Rebs: Josh Childress 8 Asts: Theo Papaloukas 4

Palasport Del Mauro, Avellino
Attendance: 4,760

October 30
19:45 CET

(Report)

Olympiacos (Greece)	83–72	(Spain) Unicaja Málaga
Scoring by quarter: 14-20, 25-18, 21-10, 23-24
Pts: Yiannis Bourousis 20; Rebs: Yiannis Bourousis 13; Asts: Theo Papaloukas 6		Pts: Robert Archibald 17; Rebs: Robert Archibald 7 Asts: Omar Cook 7

Peace and Friendship Stadium, Piraeus
Attendance: 11,420

November 06
18:30 CET

(Report)

Cibona Zagreb (Croatia)	85–76	(Greece) Olympiacos
Scoring by quarter: 14-18, 25-10, 28-27, 18-21
Pts: Earl Calloway 19; Rebs: Marin Rozic 7 Asts: Davor Kus 3		Pts: Two players with 14; Rebs: Ioannis Bourousis 9 Asts: Theo Papaloukas 5

Dražen Petrović Basketball Hall, Zagreb
Attendance: 5,200

November 13
20:45 CET

(Report)

Olympiacos (Greece)	84–65	(Israel) Maccabi Tel Aviv
Scoring by quarter: 17-24, 17-5, 21-17, 29-19
Pts: Lynn Greer 21; Rebs: Yiannis Bourousis 9 Asts: Theo Papaloukas 5		Pts: Omri Casspi 16; Rebs: D'or Fischer 6 Asts: Tal Burstein 4

Peace and Friendship Stadium, Piraeus
Attendance: 9,500

November 27
20:30 CET

(Report)

Le Mans (France)	93–98 (OT)	(Greece) Olympiacos
Scoring by quarter: 29-19, 23-22, 21-27, 14-19, Overtime: 6-11
Pts: Dewarick Spencer 19; Rebs: Alain Koffi 10; Asts: Antoine Diot 6		Pts: Lynn Greer 26; Rebs: Yiannis Bourousis 11; Asts: Theo Papaloukas 6

Antarès, Le Mans

December 03
18:00 CET

(Report)

Olympiacos (Greece)	91–66	(Italy) Air Avellino
Scoring by quarter: 20-16, 21-9, 32-15, 18-26
Pts: Josh Childress 13; Rebs: Zoran Erceg 6 Asts: Theo Papaloukas 5		Pts: Chris Warren 16; Rebs: Three players with 5 Asts: Chris Warren 4

Peace and Friendship Stadium, Piraeus
Attendance: 8,000

December 10
20:45 CET

(Report)

Unicaja Málaga (Spain)	60–56	(Greece) Olympiacos
Scoring by quarter: 17-20, 11-15, 18-9, 14-12
Pts: Thomas Kelati 16; Rebs: Carlos Jiménez 7 Asts: Omar Cook 5		Pts: Two players with 12; Rebs: Josh Childress 7 Asts: Theo Papaloukas 5

Martin Carpena, Málaga

December 18
20:45 CET

(Report)

Olympiacos (Greece)	93–64	(Croatia) Cibona Zagreb
Scoring by quarter: 20-22, 30-9, 27-18, 16-15
Pts: Two players with 13; Rebs: Nikola Vujčić 8 Asts: Two players with 5		Pts: Earl Calloway 18; Rebs: Marin Rozic 6 Asts: Two players with 2

Peace and Friendship Stadium, Piraeus
Attendance: 9,000

January 08
20:00 CET

Maccabi Tel Aviv (Israel)	96–83	(Greece) Olympiacos

Nokia Arena, Tel Aviv

January 15
20.45 CET

Olympiacos (Greece)	68–78	(France) Le Mans
Scoring by quarter: 12-15, 31-30, 44-55, 68-78
Pts: Yotam Halperin 15; Asts: Theodoros Papaloukas 4		Pts: Dewarick Spencer 20; Asts: Dewarick Spencer 3

Peace and Friendship Stadium, Piraeus

=== A1 2008–09 ===
==== Regular season ====
Pos	Team	Total							Home		Away	
		Pts	Pld	W	L	F	A	D	W	L	W	L
1	Panathinaikos	19	10	9	1	878	669	+209	5	0	4	1
2	Olympiacos	19	10	9	1	833	667	+166	5	0	4	1
3	Aris	18	10	8	2	727	665	+62	6	0	2	2
4	Panellinios	18	10	8	2	796	658	+138	5	0	3	2
5	PAOK	15	10	5	5	750	736	+14	4	2	1	3
6	Maroussi	15	10	5	5	749	742	+7	3	2	2	3
7	AEK Athens	14	10	4	6	717	736	-19	3	2	1	4
8	Kolossos Rodou	14	10	4	6	707	771	-64	2	2	2	4
9	Panionios	14	9	5	4	679	708	-29	2	1	3	3
10	Olympia Larissa	13	10	3	7	675	755	-80	2	4	1	3
11	Kavala	13	9	4	9	611	658	-47	3	3	1	2
12	Egaleo	12	10	2	8	693	775	-82	1	4	1	4
13	AEL	12	10	2	8	653	809	-156	2	2	0	6
14	Trikala	11	10	1	9	695	814	-119	1	3	0	6

Pts=Points, Pld=Matches played, W=Matches won, L=Matches lost, F=Points for, A=Points against, D=Points difference

October 11
17:00 LT

(Report)

Egaleo	65–90	Olympiacos
Scoring by quarter: 20-24, 7-22, 14-19, 24-25
Pts: Two players with 14; Rebs: Avraam Kallinikidis 4 Asts: Leemire Goldwire 5		Pts: Josh Childress 16; Rebs: Ioannis Bourousis 10; Asts: Theo Papaloukas 7

Egaleo Indoor Hall, Athens
Attendance: 1,200

October 18
18:00 LT

(Report)

Olympiacos	74–57	Aris
Scoring by quarter: 10-8, 22-16, 18-18, 24-15
Pts: Josh Childress 19; Rebs: Nikola Vujčić 5 Asts: Theo Papaloukas 5		Pts: Savas Iliadis 12; Rebs: Spencer Nelson 12; Asts: Sean Marshall 3

Peace and Friendship Stadium, Athens
Attendance: (Behind closed doors)

October 26
17:00 LT

(Report)

Olympia Larissa	66–82	Olympiacos
Scoring by quarter: 20-21, 14-24, 18-22, 14-15
Pts: Sven Schultze 17; Rebs: Three players with 5 Asts: Mike King 3		Pts: Josh Childress 19; Rebs: Ioannis Bourousis 10; Asts: Theo Papaloukas, Zoran Erceg 3

Larissa Neapolis Arena, Larissa

November 2
16:00 LT

(Report)

Olympiacos	80–71	PAOK
Scoring by quarter: 22-17, 21-14, 22-16, 15-24
Pts: Yotam Halperin 18; Rebs: Michalis Pelekanos 7 Asts: Five players with 2		Pts: Panagiotis Kafkis 14; Rebs: K'zell Wesson 6 Asts: Two players with 2

Peace and Friendship Stadium, Athens
Attendance: (Behind closed doors)

November 9
17:00 LT

(Report)

Panorama BC	51–82	Olympiacos
Scoring by quarter: 21-26, 5-21, 9-20, 16-15
Pts: Will Daniel 19; Rebs: Will Daniel 4 Asts: Pape Amagou 2		Pts: Giorgos Printezis 12; Rebs: Ioannis Bourousis 8 Asts: Theo Papaloukas 5

Kalamitsa Sports Center, Kavala
Attendance: 1,700

November 15
14:00 LT

(Report)

Olympiacos	101–84	AEK Athens B.C.
Scoring by quarter: 19-28, 29-19, 28-19, 25-18
Pts: Lynn Greer 20; Rebs: Josh Childress 6 Asts: Nikola Vujčić 7		Pts: Two players with 15 points Rebs: Travon Bryant 9 Asts: Dimitris Papanikolaou 6

Peace and Friendship Stadium, Athens
Attendance: 7,000

November 23
21:15 LT

(Report)

Panathinaikos BC	86–69	Olympiacos
Scoring by quarter: 18-15, 25-20, 20-17, 23-17
Pts: Nikola Peković 21; Rebs: Mike Batiste 7 Asts: Three players with three		Pts: Yotam Halperin 20; Rebs: Ioannis Bourousis 6 Asts: Theo Papaloukas 6

Olympic Indoor Hall, Athens
Attendance: 17,000

November 30
14:00 LT

(Report)

Olympiacos	84–50	Kolossos Rodou BC
Scoring by quarter: 24-10, 9-15, 29-8, 22-17
Pts: Josh Childress 24; Rebs: Ioannis Bourousis 9 Asts: Miloš Teodosić 7		Pts: Steven Smith 22; Rebs: Lans Harris 7 Asts: Steven Smith 2

Peace and Friendship Stadium, Athens
Attendance: 3,700

December 6
17:00 LT

(Report)

AEL 1964 BC	72–90	Olympiacos
Scoring by quarter: 15-21, 12-28, 11-22, 34-19
Pts: Giorgos Apostolidis 16; Rebs: Torin Francis 8 Asts: Thodoris Zaras 3		Pts: Josh Childress 22; Rebs: Giorgos Printezis 6 Asts: Nikola Vujčić 5

Larissa Neapolis Arena, Larissa
Attendance: 3,000

December 13
18:00 LT

(Report)

Olympiacos	81–65	Panionios B.C.
Scoring by quarter: 22-12, 22-23, 15-12, 22-19
Pts: Miloš Teodosić 17; Rebs: Ioannis Bourousis 9 Asts: Nikola Vujčić 4		Pts: Dimos Dikoudis 14; Rebs: Giannis Kalambokis 5 Asts: Three players with 2

Peace and Friendship Stadium, Athens
Attendance: 5,000

December 21
17:00 LT

Trikala	77–111	Olympiacos

Trikala Indoor Hall, Trikala

January 03
16:00 LT

Olympiacos	vs.	Panellinios

Peace and Friendship Stadium, Athens

== Greek Cup 2008–09 ==
November 19
17:00 LT

(Report)

Olympiacos	81–66	AEK Athens B.C.
Scoring by quarter: 17-13, 20-14, 26-10, 18-29
Pts: Panagiotis Vasilopoulos 12; Rebs: Two players with 3 Asts: Theo Papaloukas 5		Pts: Travon Bryant 14; Rebs: Two players with 3 Asts: Giannis Kyriakopoulos 5

Peace and Friendship Stadium, Athens
Attendance: 4,500

January 24

Olympiacos	vs.	Panionios B.C.

Peace and Friendship Stadium, Athens

== See also ==
- 2007–08 Olympiacos B.C. season
