= Eurocup Basketball 2012–13 Regular Season Group F =

Standings and Results for Group F of the Regular Season phase of the 2012–13 Eurocup basketball tournament.

== Standings ==
All times are CET (UTC+1).

Key to colors
Top two teams advance to Last 16

	Team	Pld	W	L	PF	PA	Diff	Tie-break
1.	(Russia) BC UNICS Kazan	6	5	1	481	442	+39	
2.	(Poland) Stelmet Zielona Góra	6	3	3	477	446	+31	
3.	(Belgium) BC Telenet Oostende	6	2	4	464	482	–18	1–1 (+18)
4.	(Greece) Panionios B.C.	6	2	4	466	518	–52	1–1 (–18)

=== Game 1 ===
7 November 2012
19:00

Report

Stelmet Zielona Góra (Poland)	67–74	(Russia) BC UNICS Kazan
Scoring by quarter: 20–22, 15–20, 12–16, 20–18
Pts: Hodge 16; Rebs: Hosley 7 Asts: Hodge 7		Pts: Kaimakoglou 19; Rebs: Veremeenko 7 Asts: Chatman 4

CRS Hall Zielona Góra, Zielona Góra
Attendance: 2,900
Referees: Andrej Lovsyn (SLO), Igor Dragojevic (MNE), Aleksandar Glisic (SRB)

7 November 2012
20:30

Report

BC Telenet Oostende (Belgium)	84–65	(Greece) Panionios B.C.
Scoring by quarter: 26–16, 14–21, 22–10, 22–18
Pts: Lojeski 22; Rebs: Wilkinson, Lojeski 7 Asts: Katnić, Lojeski 5		Pts: Bogris, Pappas, Booker 13; Rebs: Pappas 7 Asts: Payne, Milbourne, Athanasoulas 2

Sleuyter Arena, Ostend
Attendance: 2,654
Referees: Joseph Bissang (FRA), Sergiy Zashchuck (UKR), Jurgis Laurinavicius (LTU)

=== Game 2 ===
14 November 2012
16:00

Report

BC UNICS Kazan (Russia)	83–72	(Belgium) BC Telenet Oostende
Scoring by quarter: 27–15, 21–19, 22–18, 13–20
Pts: Vougioukas 20; Rebs: Veremeenko 6 Asts: Eidson 8		Pts: Wright 15; Rebs: Wright 5 Asts: Katnić 5

Basket-Hall Arena, Kazan
Attendance: 3,000
Referees: Murat Biricik (TUR), Marcin Kowalski (POL), Gentian Cici (ALB)

14 November 2012
18:00

Report

Panionios B.C. (Greece)	70–76	(Poland) Stelmet Zielona Góra
Scoring by quarter: 12–23, 11–19, 22–16, 25–18
Pts: Janković 16; Rebs: Janković 6 Asts: Athinaiou 8		Pts: Hodge 19; Rebs: Stević 8 Asts: Hosley 5

Helliniko Olympic Arena, Athens
Attendance: 1,350
Referees: Milivoje Jovcic (SRB), Roberto Chiari (ITA), Omer Esteron (ISR)

=== Game 3 ===
21 November 2012
18:00

Report

Panionios B.C. (Greece)	72–92	(Russia) BC UNICS Kazan
Scoring by quarter: 20–26, 23–23, 14–22, 15–21
Pts: Pappas 24; Rebs: Janković 7 Asts: Milbourne 2		Pts: Eidson 22; Rebs: Veremeenko 7 Asts: Eidson 6

Helliniko Olympic Arena, Athens
Attendance: 700
Referees: Matej Boltauzer (SLO), Aleksandar Milojevic (MKD), Saso Petek (SLO)

21 November 2012
20:30

Report

BC Telenet Oostende (Belgium)	80–74	(Poland) Stelmet Zielona Góra
Scoring by quarter: 16–14, 20–23, 28–15, 16–22
Pts: Lojeski 21; Rebs: Lojeski 8 Asts: Đorđević 5		Pts: Hodge 24; Rebs: Stević 15; Asts: Stević 4

Sleuyter Arena, Ostend
Attendance: 2,130
Referees: Andrej Jersan (SLO), Radomir Vojinovic (MNE), Jasmina Juras (SRB)

=== Game 4 ===
28 November 2012
16:00

Report

BC UNICS Kazan (Russia)	82–73	(Greece) Panionios B.C.
Scoring by quarter: 22–21, 21–15, 26–16, 13–21
Pts: Vougioukas 17; Rebs: Vougioukas 10; Asts: Chatman 9		Pts: Pappas 34; Rebs: Booker 10; Asts: Athinaiou, Batis, Pappas 3

Basket-Hall Arena, Kazan
Attendance: 3,000
Referees: Recep Ankarali (TUR), Tomas Jasevicius (LTU), Ersan Kartal (TUR)

28 November 2012
19:00

Report

Stelmet Zielona Góra (Poland)	85–61	(Belgium) BC Telenet Oostende
Scoring by quarter: 25–15, 25–12, 18–20, 17–14
Pts: Hodge 22; Rebs: Stević, Hosley 7 Asts: Hosley, Hodge 6		Pts: Stojić 16; Rebs: Lojeski 6 Asts: Đorđević 4

CRS Hall Zielona Góra, Zielona Góra
Attendance: 3,250
Referees: Gianluca Mattioli (ITA), Sasa Maricic (SRB), Ingus Baumanis (LAT)

=== Game 5 ===
5 December 2012
16:00

Report

BC UNICS Kazan (Russia)	76–91	(Poland) Stelmet Zielona Góra
Scoring by quarter: 18–21, 23–24, 20–25, 15–21
Pts: Vougioukas 21; Rebs: Vougioukas 11; Asts: Chatman 4		Pts: Hodge 27; Rebs: Hosley 7 Asts: Hodge 7

Basket-Hall Arena, Kazan
Attendance: 3,000
Referees: Andrej Lovsyn (SLO), Sergiy Chebyshev (UKR), Miroslav Tomov (BUL)

5 December 2012
18:00

Report

Panionios B.C. (Greece)	101–100	(Belgium) BC Telenet Oostende
Scoring by quarter: 21–26, 20–14, 24–19, 24–30
Pts: Milbourne 26; Rebs: Payne, Dragićević, Booker 3 Asts: Batis 6		Pts: Đorđević 20; Rebs: Wes Wilkinson, Lojeski 8 Asts: Đorđević 8

Helliniko Olympic Arena, Athens
Attendance: 500
Referees: Nicola Maestre (FRA), Moritz Reiter (GER), Tomislav Vovk (CRO)

=== Game 6 ===
12 December 2012
20:00

Report

Stelmet Zielona Góra (Poland)	84–85	(Greece) Panionios B.C.
Scoring by quarter: 24–26, 20–20, 22–31, 18–8
Pts: Hodge 24; Rebs: Stević 10; Asts: Hodge, Česnauskis 4		Pts: Pappas 21; Rebs: Payne 6 Asts: Athinaiou 4

CRS Hall Zielona Góra, Zielona Góra
Attendance: 2,258
Referees: Paolo Taurino (ITA), Arnis Ozols (LAT), Lahdo Sharro (SWE)

12 December 2012
20:00

Report

BC Telenet Oostende (Belgium)	67–74	(Russia) BC UNICS Kazan
Scoring by quarter: 11–15, 15–21, 18–24, 23–14
Pts: Lojeski 14; Rebs: Wilkinson, McLean 7 Asts: Four players 2		Pts: Vougioukas 18; Rebs: Eidson 6 Asts: Samoylenko 3

Sleuyter Arena, Ostend
Attendance: 1,945
Referees: Marek Cmikiewicz (POL), Oliver Krause (GER), Regis Bardera (FRA)
