= UC Davis Aggies men's basketball statistical leaders =

The UC Davis Aggies men's basketball statistical leaders are individual statistical leaders of the UC Davis Aggies men's basketball program in various categories, including points, assists, blocks, rebounds, and steals. Within those areas, the lists identify single-game, single-season, and career leaders. The Aggies represent the University of California, Davis in the NCAA's Big West Conference.

UC Davis began competing in intercollegiate basketball in 1910. However, the school's record book does not generally list records from before the 1950s, as records from before this period are often incomplete and inconsistent. Since scoring was much lower in this era, and teams played much fewer games during a typical season, it is likely that few or no players from this era would appear on these lists anyway.

The NCAA did not officially record assists as a stat until the 1983–84 season, and blocks and steals until the 1985–86 season, but UC Davis' record books includes players in these stats before these seasons. These lists are updated through the end of the 2020–21 season.

== Scoring ==
Career
Rk	Player	Points	Seasons
1	Elijah Pepper	2,284	2019–20 2020–21 2021–22 2022–23 2023–24
2	Audwin Thomas	1,821	1975–76 1976–77 1977–78 1978–79
3	Corey Hawkins	1,694	2012–13 2013–14 2014–15
	Ty Johnson	1,694	2022–23 2023–24 2024–25
5	Preston Neumayr	1,578	1979–80 1980–81 1981–82 1982–83
6	Vince Oliver	1,523	2005–06 2006–07 2007–08 2008–09
7	Siler Schneider	1,440	2015–16 2016–17 2017–18 2018–19
	Mark Olson	1,440	1972–73 1973–74 1974–75 1975–76
9	Pete Buchwald	1,405	1984–85 1985–86 1986–87 1987–88
10	Mark Payne	1,399	2006–07 2007–08 2008–09 2009–10 2010–11

Season
Rk	Player	Points	Season
1	Elijah Pepper	697	2022–23
2	Elijah Pepper	682	2023–24
3	Ty Johnson	675	2024–25
4	Randy DeBortoli	606	1987–88
5	Corey Hawkins	586	2014–15
6	Brynton Lemar	581	2016–17
7	Preston Neumayr	575	1982–83
8	Corey Hawkins	569	2012–13
	Ty Johnson	569	2023–24
10	Mark Olson	560	1975–76

Single game
Rk	Player	Points	Season	Opponent
1	Corey Hawkins	40	2012–13	Hawai'i
2	Mike Lien	39	1978–79	Cal St. Stanislaus
3	Randy DeBortoli	38	1987–88	Chico State
	Parrish Johnson	38	1986–87	Humboldt State
	Ron Knight	38	1951–52	Humboldt State
6	Fowzi Abdelsamad	37	2002–03	UC San Diego
	Kevin Vasquez	37	1994–95	Humboldt State
8	Mike Lien	36	1978–79	Nevada
9	Ty Johnson	35	2024–25	UC Santa Barbara
	Ty Johnson	35	2024–25	Washington
	Joe Mooney	35	2019–20	Northern Arizona
	Josh Ritchart	35	2013–14	SIU Edwardsville
	Eddie Miller	35	2010–11	UC Riverside
	Jess McElree	35	2001–02	Cal St. Stanislaus
	Preston Neumayr	35	1982–83	Pacific
	John Frost	35	1966–67	Portland State
	Ray Crawford	35	1960–61	S.F. State

== Rebounds ==
Career
Rk	Player	Rebounds	Seasons
1	Alan Budde	952	1965–66 1966–67 1967–68
2	Mark Olson	869	1972–73 1973–74 1974–75 1975–76
3	Dominic Callori	844	1999–00 2000–01 2001–02 2002–03
4	Pete Buchwald	757	1984–85 1985–86 1986–87 1987–88
5	Elijah Pepper	722	2019–20 2020–21 2021–22 2022–23 2023–24
6	Ron McMillan	682	1969–70 1970–71 1971–72
7	Justis Durkee	650	1995–96 1996–97 1997–98
8	Mike Lien	646	1977–78 1978–79
9	Niko Rocak	605	2022–23 2023–24 2024–25 2025–26
10	Joe Harden	602	2008–09 2009–10 2010–11

Season
Rk	Player	Rebounds	Season
1	Mike Lien	365	1978–79
2	Ron McMillan	349	1971–72
3	Chima Moneke	341	2016–17
4	Alan Budde	334	1966–67
5	Alan Budde	310	1967–68
6	Alan Budde	308	1965–66
7	Dominic Callori	282	2001–02
8	Mike Lien	281	1977–78
9	Randy DeBortoli	269	1987–88
10	Dominic Callori	255	2002–03

Single game
Rk	Player	Rebounds	Season	Opponent
1	Dominic Callori	24	2001–02	Sonoma State
2	Alan Budde	23	1966–67	Colorado College
3	Mike Lien	22	1977–78	UC Riverside
4	Mike Lien	21	1978–79	Cal St. Stanislaus
	Mike Lien	21	1978–79	Chico State
6	Mike Lien	20	1978–79	Humboldt State
	Mike Lien	20	1977–78	Cal St. Stanislaus
8	Josh Fox	18	2015–16	Long Beach State
	Chris Ferenz	18	1986–87	Pacific
	Mark Ford	18	1973–74	Humboldt State
	Chima Moneke	18	2016–17	Cal Poly

== Assists ==
Career
Rk	Player	Assists	Seasons
1	Angelo Rivers	467	1982–83 1983–84 1984–85 1985–86
2	Mark Payne	448	2006–07 2007–08 2008–09 2009–10 2010–11
3	Darius Graham	418	2012–13 2013–14 2014–15 2015–16 2016–17
4	Dante Ross	380	1996–97 1997–98 1998–99
5	Rommel Marentez	307	2002–03 2003–04 2004–05 2005–06 2006–07
6	Tyler Boyd	299	1998–99 1999–00 2000–01 2001–02
7	Elijah Pepper	295	2019–20 2020–21 2021–22 2022–23 2023–24
8	Danny Yoshikawa	292	1994–95 1995–96
9	Ty Johnson	276	2022–23 2023–24 2024–25
10	Gus Argenal	274	2000–01 2001–02 2002–03 2003–04

Season
Rk	Player	Assists	Season
1	Dante Ross	166	1997–98
2	Geoff Probst	162	1988–89
3	Angelo Rivers	152	1984–85
4	Danny Yoshikawa	151	1995–96
5	Mark Payne	148	2008–09
6	TJ Shorts II	146	2017–18
7	Danny Yoshikawa	141	1994–95
8	Angelo Rivers	137	1985–86
9	Glendell King	135	1987–88
10	Brayden Fagbemi	133	2025–26

Single game
Rk	Player	Assists	Season	Opponent
1	Gus Argenal	13	2003–04	UC San Diego
	Matt Cordova	13	1990–91	Chico State
3	Angelo Rivers	12	1984–85	UC Berkeley
4	Ty Johnson	11	2024–25	Cal Poly
	TJ Shorts II	11	2018–19	Cal Poly
	Paolo Mancasola	11	2012–13	Hawai'i
	Marcus Knott	11	1996–97	Humboldt State
	Danny Yoshikawa	11	1995–96	Dominican
	Danny Yoshikawa	11	1994–95	S.F. State
	Glendell King	11	1987–88	Cal St. Hayward

== Steals ==
Career
Rk	Player	Steals	Seasons
1	Elijah Pepper	222	2019–20 2020–21 2021–22 2022–23 2023–24
2	Ty Johnson	187	2022–23 2023–24 2024–25
3	Dante Ross	186	1996–97 1997–98 1998–99
4	Angelo Rivers	180	1982–83 1983–84 1984–85 1985–86
5	Mark Payne	179	2006–07 2007–08 2008–09 2009–10 2010–11
6	Chris Familetti	172	1988–89 1990–91 1991–92
7	Rommel Marentez	133	2002–03 2003–04 2004–05 2005–06 2006–07
8	Corey Hawkins	125	2012–13 2013–14 2014–15
9	Tyler Boyd	121	1998–99 1999–00 2000–01 2001–02
	Jason Cox	121	1996–97 1997–98 1998–99 1999–00

Season
Rk	Player	Steals	Season
1	Chris Familetti	93	1991–92
2	Chris Familetti	79	1990–91
3	Dante Ross	76	1997–98
4	Ty Johnson	72	2024–25
5	TJ Shorts II	63	2017–18
6	Brayden Fagbemi	62	2025–26
7	Dante Ross	58	1998–99
	Ty Johnson	58	2023–24
9	Mark Payne	57	2007–08
	Ty Johnson	57	2022–23

Single game
Rk	Player	Steals	Season	Opponent
1	Chris Familetti	11	1991–92	Menlo
2	Ty Johnson	8	2022–23	Milwaukee
	Mark Payne	8	2009–10	UC Santa Cruz
	Chris Familetti	8	1990–91	Pomona
5	Elijah Pepper	7	2023–24	Cal State Northridge
	Dante Ross	7	1997–98	Chico State
	Justis Durkee	7	1997–98	Central Washington
	Darryl Chambers	7	1995–96	Notre Dame
	Chris Familetti	7	1990–91	Sac State
	Robert Rose	7	1984–85	Pomona-Pitzer

== Blocks ==
Career
Rk	Player	Blocks	Seasons
1	Jason Cox	154	1996–97 1997–98 1998–99 1999–00
	Niko Rocak	154	2022–23 2023–24 2024–25 2025–26
3	J.T. Adenrele	111	2011–12 2012–13 2014–15 2016–17
4	Dominic Calegari	79	2006–07 2007–08 2008–09 2009–10
5	Pete Buchwald	74	1984–85 1985–86 1986–87 1987–88
	Chima Moneke	74	2015–16 2016–17 2017–18
7	Christian Anigwe	71	2020–21 2021–22 2022–23
8	Josh Ritchart	68	2010–11 2011–12 2012–13 2013–14 2014–15
	Micah Watson	68	1991–92 1992–93 1993–94
10	Peter Vanos	61	1987–88 1988–89 1990–91 1991–92

Season
Rk	Player	Blocks	Season
1	Niko Rocak	58	2024–25
2	Chima Moneke	51	2016–17
3	Niko Rocak	50	2025–26
4	J.T. Adenrele	46	2012–13
	Jason Cox	46	1997–98
6	Niko Rocak	41	2023–24
7	Christian Anigwe	40	2022–23
8	Jason Cox	39	1996–97
	Randy DeBortoli	39	1987–88
10	Jason Cox	37	1998–99

Single game
Rk	Player	Blocks	Season	Opponent
1	Niko Rocak	6	2023–24	UC Irvine
	Niko Rocak	6	2025–26	North Dakota State
3	Christian Anigwe	5	2022–23	UC Irvine
	Christian Anigwe	5	2022–23	Pacific
	Garrison Goode	5	2018–19	Cal State Fullerton
	Mike Kurtz	5	2010–11	Seattle
	Jason Cox	5	1997–98	St. Rose (N.Y.)
	Randy DeBortoli	5	1987–88	Cal St. Hayward
	Michael Boone	5	2007–08	UC Santa Barbara
10	Christian Anigwe	4	2022–23	Boston University
	Matt Neufeld	4	2018–19	Cal Poly
	J.T. Adenrele	4	2012–13	UC Irvine
	J.T. Adenrele	4	2012–13	UC Riverside
	J.T. Adenrele	4	2011–12	Cal Poly
	Joe Harden	4	2009–10	UC Riverside
	Mark Payne	4	2009–10	Seattle
	Jaqay Carlyle	4	2004–05	Pacific
	Jason Cox	4	1999–00	Western Oregon
	Jason Cox	4	1998–99	Chico State
	Jason Cox	4	1996–97	Sonoma State
	Jason Cox	4	1996–97	Dominican
	Rick Gonzales	4	1996–97	S.F. State
	Micah Watson	4	1991–92	Pacific Christian
	Omari Smith	4	1989–90	Cal St. Stanislaus
	Mark Jensen	4	1989–90	Cal St. Northridge
	Mark Jensen	4	1989–90	Pacific
	Robert Rose	4	1984–85	S.F. State
	Chima Moneke	4	2016–17	Cal State Fullerton
	J.T. Adenrele	4	2016–17	Long Beach State
	Chima Moneke	4	2016–17	Long Beach State
	Chima Moneke	4	2017–18	Long Beach State
	Chima Moneke	4	2017–18	William Jessup
	Niko Rocak	4	2024–25	Idaho
	Niko Rocak	4	2024–25	Cal State Fullerton
	Niko Rocak	4	2024–25	UC Irvine
	Niko Rocak	4	2024–25	Cal State Fullerton
	Niko Rocak	4	2025–26	Sacramento State
	Niko Rocak	4	2025–26	UC Santa Barbara
	Niko Rocak	4	2025–26	Long Beach State
