= Stelios Ioannou =

Greek basketball player

No. 14 – Doukas
- Position: Shooting guard / small forward
- League: Greek A2 League

Personal information
- Born: July 28, 1987 (age 39) Marousi, Athens
- Listed height: 6 ft 7 in (2.01 m)
- Listed weight: 215 lb (98 kg)

Career information
- Playing career: 2004–present

Career history
- 2004–2010: Ilysiakos
- 2010–2012: Panionios
- 2012–2013: KAOD
- 2013–2014: Ilysiakos
- 2014–2015: Panelefsiniakos
- 2015–2016: Doxa Lefkadas
- 2017–present: Doukas

Stelios Ioannou (Greek: Στέλιος Ιωάννου; born July 28, 1987, in Athens, Greece) is a Greek professional basketball player. He is 6'7" and plays at the shooting guard position.

== Professional career ==
After playing in the top-tier level Greek Basket League with Ilysiakos, Panionios, KAOD, and Panelefsiniakos, Ioannou signed with the Greek 2nd Division club, Doxa Lefkadas, in 2015.

== Personal life ==
Ioannou is the son of professional basketball coach Memos Ioannou, who was also a former professional basketball player, of Panathinaikos, and the senior men's Greek national basketball team.
