= Michael Paragyios =

Greek basketball player

Michael Paragyios Μιχάλης Παραγιός
Personal information
- Born: August 25, 1982 (age 44) Glyfada, Athens, Greece
- Listed height: 6 ft 9.5 in (2.07 m)
- Listed weight: 245 lb (111 kg)

Career information
- Playing career: 2001–2017
- Position: Power forward / center
- Number: 17

Career history
- 2001–2005: Ionikos Nikeas
- 2005–2007: Ilysiakos
- 2007–2008: Maroussi
- 2008–2012: Panionios
- 2012–2014: Ilysiakos
- 2014–2015: Ethnikos Piraeus
- 2016–2017: Proteas Voulas

Career highlights
- Greek All-Star Game Slam Dunk Champion (2006)

Michael Paragyios (alternate spellings: Michalis, Mihalis Paragios) (Greek: Μιχάλης Παραγιός; born August 25, 1982, in Glyfada, Athens, Greece) is a Greek former professional basketball player. At a height of 2.07m (6 ft 9 ½ in) tall, he played at the power forward and center positions.

== Professional career ==
Paragyios began playing basketball with Aris Glyfada. During his pro career, he played with some of the following clubs: Ionikos Nikeas, Ilysiakos, Maroussi, and Panionios. He won the Greek All-Star Game Slam Dunk Contest in the year 2006. In 2014, he joined Ethnikos Piraeus.
