= Panelefsiniakos B.C. =

- Nickname: Σταχυοφόροι (Spikelets)
- Leagues: B Basket League; Greek Cup
- Founded: Panelefsiniakos AO: 1931; Basketball Section: 1969
- History: 1969 – Present
- Arena: Elefsina Indoor Hall "Gouva"
- Capacity: 1,100
- Location: Eleusis, Greece
- Team colors: White and Blue
- President: Ioannis Filippou
- Head coach: Lefteris Kalogirou
- Championships: 1 Greek A2 Championship (2012); 1 Greek C Championship (2009)
- Website: panelefsiniakosbc.com
Home	Away

Panelefsiniakos B.C. (Greek: Πανελευσινιακός K.A.E.) is a Greek professional basketball club that is located in Elefsina, Greece. Panelefsiniakos basketball section was founded in 1969, and the club is also commonly known as Elefsina B.C. The team competes in the Greek B Basket League since 2015.

== History ==
The club's parent athletic association, Panelefsiniakos A.O.K. Elefsina, was founded in the year 1931. The club's basketball section, Panelefsiniakos B.C., was founded in the year 1969. Panelefsiniakos B.C. won the Greek Second Division championship in 2012.

=== 2012–2015: The A1 experience ===
The club competed in the first tier professional basketball league in Greece (Greek Basket League) for first time in its history in the 2012–13 season. Panelefsiniakos made a mediocre start at its debut Greek Basket League season, as the team registered just 2 victories in the first 10 match days of the league. The team spent the first round playing at Peristeri Arena (17 km away from the town of Elefsina), due to necessary renovation to its home court which lasted for about 3 months. In order to avoid relegation, Panelefsiniakos improved its performance in the following months and got crucial wins at home against PAOK, Panionios and Peristeri. The team of coach Giorgos Skarafigkas beat also KAOD and Rethymno and finished the season with a 7–19 record (11th spot in the standings). Greek combo guard Nikos Liakopoulos was the team's season MVP with 15.3 points per game on average and generally had great contribution.

After the end of a successful season, Panelefsiniakos made a lot of important changes to its roster in summer of 2013, including the addition of Olympiacos former captain and Greek NT member Manolis Papamakarios. The blue-whites begun strongly the 2013–14 season with 3 victories in the first 5 games, one of them on the road against Ikaros at Chalkida. Two match days before regular season's end, Panelefsiniakos, led by swingman David Kyles who scored 20 points and grabbed 4 rebounds, crushed Trikala at home and made a decisive step in order to stay at the top division. Finally, the goal was achieved as the club, despite its ups and downs during the year, once again managed to avoid relegation. Coach Skarafigkas' players celebrated 7 wins, in a season where center Larry Turner (9.2 points and 3.2 rebounds per game) and power forward Mouhammad Faye (13.5 points and 7.6 rebounds per game) were solid.

== Season by season ==
Season	Tier	Division	Pos.	P/S	Greek Cup	Europe
2005–06	4	C Basket League	7	—	—	—
2006–07	4	C Basket League	8	—	—	—
2007–08	4	C Basket League	4	—	—	—
2008–09	4	C Basket League	1	Promoted	—	—
2009–10	3	B Basket League	2	Promoted	—	—
2010–11	2	A2 Basket League	8	—	1st Round	—
2011–12	2	A2 Basket League	1	Promoted	1st Round	—
2012–13	1	A1 Basket League	11	—	2nd Round	—
2013–14	1	A1 Basket League	12	—	2nd Round	—
2014–15	1	A1 Basket League	13	Relegated	2nd Round	—
2015–16	3	B Basket League	6	—	—	—
2016–17	3	B Basket League	7	—	—	—
2017–18	3	B Basket League	12	—	—	—

== Arenas ==
Panelefsiniakos plays its home games at the Elefsina Indoor Hall (also known as "Gouva"), which has a seating capacity of 1,100 people. The club used Peristeri Indoor Hall for some months in the beginning of the 2012–13 season, due to renovation to its traditional home court.

== Roster ==
Note: Flags indicate national team eligibility at FIBA-sanctioned events. Players may hold other non-FIBA nationalities not displayed.

Panelefsiniakos B.C. roster
Players
Coaches

Pos.	No.	Nat.	Name	Ht.	Wt.	Age
CG	17	(Greece)	Avramidis, Dimos	1.89 m (6 ft 2 in)
F	--	(Greece)	Mantzioris, Nikos	2.00 m (6 ft 7 in)

Head coach

- (Greece) Giorgos Skarafingas

Legend

- (C) Team captain
- Injured

- Roster
Updated: 2013-04-22

=== Depth chart ===
Pos.	Starting 5	Bench 1	Bench 2	Bench 3
C	Andreas Psaropoulos	Vangelis Chortsas	Giannis Pikeas
PF	Kostas Kefalas	Ilias Iliadis	Ntinos Doukas
SF		Alexandros Karabelas	Giorgos Stathopoulos	Konstantinos Arkidiaris
SG	Nikos Voulgaris	Babis Mouratidis	Giorgos Ballas
PG	Giannis Kyriakopoulos	Alkiviadis Ioannou	Kostas Kyriakopoulos

== Titles ==
- A2 Basket League: (1)
  - 2012
- C Basket League: (1)
  - 2009
- Total Titles: 2

== Notable players and statistics ==
Note: Flags indicate national team eligibility at FIBA-sanctioned events. Players may hold other non-FIBA nationalities not displayed.

Criteria

To appear in this section a player must have either:

- Set a club record or won an individual award while at the club
- Played at least one official international match for their national team at any time
- Played at least one official NBA match at any time.

- (Greece) Dimos Avramidis (63 Apps - 118 Pts - 74 Rebs)
- (Greece) Thomas Nikou (49 Apps - 200 Pts - 160 Asts)
- (Greece) Spyros Magkounis (30 Apps - 247 Pts - 78 Rebs)
- (Greece) Nikos Liakopoulos (26 Apps - 399 Pts - 121 Asts)
- (Greece) Nikos Papanikolopoulos (26 Apps - 237 Pts - 44 Asts)
- (Greece) Ioannis Dimakos (26 Apps - 35 Pts - 28 Rebs)
- (Greece) Manos Papamakarios (26 Apps - 239 Pts - 76 Asts)
- (Greece) Nikos Papanikolaou (25 Apps - 154 Pts - 71 Rebs)
- (Greece) Antonis Mantzaris (25 Apps - 139 Pts - 47 Rebs)
- (Greece) Periklis Dorkofikis (24 Apps - 125 Pts - 52 Rebs)
- (Greece) Ioannis Athanasoulas (24 Apps - 202 Pts - 61 Rebs)
- (Greece) Stelios Ioannou (23 Apps - 118 Pts - 71 Rebs)
- (Greece) Fotios Vasilopoulos (23 Apps - 120 Pts - 82 Asts)
- (Greece) Georgios Tsiakos (23 Apps - 136 Pts - 92 Rebs)
- (Greece) Efthymios Tsakaleris (19 Apps - 38 Pts - 33 Rebs)
- (Greece) Dimitris Arapis (19 Apps - 44 Pts - 27 Rebs)
- (Greece) Nikos Kalles (10 Apps - 32 Pts - 15 Rebs)
- (Greece) Alexandros Sigkounas (didn't play in Greek Basket League)
- (Greece) Fotios Zoumpos (didn't play in Greek Basket League)
- (Greece) Nikos Kaklamanos (didn't play in Greek Basket League)
- (Greece) Manolis Koukoulas (didn't play in Greek Basket League)
- (Greece) Giannis Kyriakopoulos (didn't play in Greek Basket League)
- (Greece) Alekos Petroulas (didn't play in Greek Basket League)
- (Greece) Dimitris Benos (didn't play in Greek Basket League)
- (Greece) Christos Deligiannis (didn't play in Greek Basket League)
- (Greece) Vangelis Balafas (didn't play in Greek Basket League)
- (United States) Larry Turner (27 Apps - 239 Pts - 135 Rebs)
- (United States) Rob Jones (24 Apps - 263 Pts - 156 Rebs)
- (United States) Elijah Johnson (22 Apps - 238 Pts - 81 Rebs)
- (United States) Brandis Raley-Ross (17 Apps - 155 Pts - 51 Rebs)
- (United States) Kurt Looby (16 Apps - 142 Pts - 139 Rebs)
- (United States) Xavier Gibson (15 Apps - 125 Pts - 49 Rebs)
- (United States) Ned Cox (15 Apps - 67 Pts - 17 Rebs)
- (United States) Harper Kamp (14 Apps - 68 Pts - 44 Rebs)
- (United States) Vincent Simpson (12 Apps - 61 Pts - 19 Rebs)
- (United States) Callistus Eziukwu (12 Apps - 158 Pts - 95 Rebs)
- (United States) Josh Fisher (11 Apps - 58 Pts - 20 Asts)
- (United States) Frank Robinson (11 Apps - 120 Pts - 46 Rebs)
- (United States) Keyon Carter (8 Apps - 10 Pts - 7 Rebs)
- (United States) Aaric Murray (7 Apps - 70 Pts - 41 Rebs)
- (United States) John Ofoegbu (7 Apps - 21 Pts - 6 Rebs)
- (United States) David Kyles (6 Apps - 81 Pts - 29 Rebs)
- (United States) Jamal Wilson (4 Apps - 30 Pts - 7 Rebs)
- (United States) Terrence Joyner (4 Apps - 5 Pts - 7 Rebs)
- (United States) Nikolas Raivio (4 Apps - 28 Pts - 8 Rebs)
- (United States) Tyler Hughes (3 Apps - 2 Pts - 2 Rebs)
- (United States) Amoke Omondi (Only pre-season)
- (Serbia) Nikola Marković (26 Apps - 293 Pts - 169 Rebs)
- (Bosnia and Herzegovina) Nemanja Mitrović (13 Apps - 110 Pts - 25 Rebs)
- (Senegal) Mouhammad Faye (22 Apps - 297 Pts - 168 Rebs)
- (Lithuania) Rokas Uzas (5 Apps - 19 Pts - 8 Rebs)
- (Nigeria) Micheal Eric (1 App - 19 Pts - 7 Rebs)
- Notice: The statistics are about Basket League only, not other divisions or Greek Cup.

== Head coaches ==
- (Greece) Georgios Kalafatakis
