= Marios Matalon =

Greek basketball player

Marios Matalon Μάριος Ματαλών
ASK Karditsas
- Position: Point guard
- League: Greek A2 Basket League

Personal information
- Born: February 16, 1989 (age 37) Thessaloniki, Greece
- Listed height: 6 ft 1.25 in (1.86 m)
- Listed weight: 185 lb (84 kg)

Career information
- College: Wyoming (2007)
- NBA draft: 2011: undrafted
- Playing career: 2005–present

Career history
- 2005–2007: Aris Thessaloniki
- 2007–2008: Kolossos Rodou
- 2008–2009: AEL 1964
- 2009–2010: Hapoel Afula
- 2010–2011: Koroivos Amaliadas
- 2011–2012: Ilysiakos
- 2012–2013: OFI Crete
- 2013–2015: Aries Trikala
- 2015–2016: Rethymno Cretan Kings
- 2016–2017: Panionios
- 2017–2018: Apollon Patras
- 2018–2019: Hapoel Ramat Gan Givatayim
- 2019–2020: Koroivos Amaliadas
- 2020–present: ASK Karditsas

Career highlights
- Greek 2nd Division champion (2017)
Medals
Men's basketball
Representing Greece
FIBA Europe Under-16 Championship
Silver medal – second place	2007 Spain	Under-18

Marios Matalon (Greek: Μάριος Ματαλών; born February 16, 1989) is a Greek professional basketball player who last played for ASK Karditsas of the Greek A2 Basket League in 2021. Matalon, who was born in Thessaloniki, Greece, is a 1.86 m (6 ft 1 1/4 in) tall point guard.

== College career ==
Matalon played college basketball at the University of Wyoming, with the Wyoming Cowboys, only for one year in 2007.

== Professional career ==
Some of the clubs that Matalon has played with during his pro career include: Aris Thessaloniki, AEL 1964, Kolossos, Hapoel Megido, Koroivos Amaliadas, Ilysiakos, Aries Trikala, OFI Crete, and Rethymno Cretan Kings.

On August 31, 2017, Matalon joined Apollon Patras of the Greek A2 League.

On July 24, 2018, Matalon signed a one-year deal with the Israeli team Hapoel Ramat Gan Givatayim of the Liga Leumit (Israeli 2nd Division).

On August 29, 2019, Matalon returned to Greece and signed with Koroivos Amaliadas.
