= David Teague =

David Teague is the name of:

- David Teague (basketball) (born 1983), American collegiate basketball player
- David Teague (footballer) (born 1981), Australian rules football player and coach
