= AEL BC =

AEL BC may refer to:

- A.E.L. 1964 B.C., Greek basketball club
- AEL Limassol B.C., Cypriot basketball club
