= 2007–08 Olympiacos B.C. season =

In the season 2007–08, Olympiacos was considered amongst the favourites to reach the Final Four of the EuroLeague. It is also considered the favourite along with Panathinaikos in the A1 Ethniki. In the Regular Season the team had the record of 22 wins and 4 defeats, having produced the second most offensive basketball in the Greek League. For the Quarter-finals of the Playoffs, Olympiacos swept AEK Athens in a best-of-three series and for the Semi-finals won Maroussi in a best-of-five series by 3-2. In the Finals of the Greek League Reds faced the eternal enemy Panathinaikos. Meanwhile, in Europe the team qualified for the third phase (quarter-finals) of the Euroleague, where it was eliminated by CSKA Moscow. Additionally, Olympiacos qualified to the Greek Cup Final, where they lost to the arch-rival Panathinaikos in a very impressive game, which was dramatic up to the last second.

== A1 2007–08 ==
=== Regular season ===
Last match

April 23
17:00 LT

(Report)

**Olympiacos**	**80**–48	AGO Rethymno
Scoring by quarter: **17**-10, **29**-13, **21**-11, 13-**14**
Pts: Tsakalidis 13; Rebs: Two players with 6 Asts: Six players with 2		Pts: Vouyoukas 14; Rebs: Vouyoukas 11; Asts: Koumoulos 3

Peace and Friendship Stadium, Athens
Attendance: 3,970

=== Play-offs ===
This is the outlook for the 2008 Α1 playoffs. Teams in bold advance to the next round.

Quarter-finals
**1**	**Panathinaikos**	**74**	**78**	–
8	Olympia Larissas	55	58	–
**4**	**Panionios**	**83**	**95**	–
5	Panellinios	70	80	–
**2**	**Olympiacos**	**92**	**70**	–
7	AEK Athens	62	68	–
3	Aris	61	**98**	79
**6**	**Maroussi**	**72**	95	**85**

Semi-finals
**1**	**Panathinaikos**	**91**	**80**	**98**	–	–
4	Panionios	75	76	75	–	–
**2**	**Olympiacos**	**87**	90	**85**	75	**64**
6	Maroussi	61	**97**	69	**86**	63

Finals
1	Panathinaikos	**83**	55	**78**	57
2	Olympiacos	79	**71**	67	**59**
Euroleague Match
4	Panionios	60	65	**89**	**96**
6	Maroussi	**67**	**76**	82	84

Quarter-finals
Game	1st Game	2nd Game	3rd Game
Arena	Peace and Friendship Stadium, Athens	Olympic Indoor Hall, Athens	–
Date	3 May 2008	5 May 2008	–
Report	QF-Game1	QF-Game2	–

Semi-finals
Game	1st Game	2nd Game	3rd Game	4th Game	5th Game
Arena	Peace and Friendship Stadium, Athens	Agios Thomas Indoor Hall, Athens	Peace and Friendship Stadium, Athens	Agios Thomas Indoor Hall, Athens	Peace and Friendship Stadium, Athens
Date	10 May 2008	13 May 2008	15 May 2008	18 May 2008	21 May 2008
Report	SF-Game1	SF-Game2	SF-Game3	SF-Game4	SF-Game5

Finals
Game	1st Game	2nd Game	3rd Game	4th Game	5th Game
Arena	Olympic Indoor Hall, Athens	Peace and Friendship Stadium, Athens	Olympic Indoor Hall, Athens	Peace and Friendship Stadium, Athens	Olympic Indoor Hall, Athens
Date	24 May 2008	27 May 2008	29 May 2008	1 June 2008	4 June 2008
Report	F-Game1	F-Game2	F-Game3	F-Game4	21:00 LT

=== Greek Cup 2007–08 ===
==== Quarter-final ====
December 22
17:00 LT

(Report)

AEK Athens	69–**83**	**Olympiacos**
Scoring by quarter: 17-**26**, **17**-16, 17-**18**, 18-**23**

Olympic Indoor Hall, Athens
Attendance: 3,500

==== Semi-final ====
February 6
19:15 LT

(Report)

**Olympiacos**	**72**–70	Aris TT Bank
Scoring by quarter: 18-**20**, 13-**23**, **17**-10, **24**-17

Peace and Friendship Stadium, Athens
Attendance: 9,500

==== Final ====
March 26
18:30 LT

(Report)

Olympiacos	79–**81**	**Panathinaikos**
Scoring by quarter: 12-12, 18-**22**, 20-**26**, **29**-21
Pts: Greer 28; Rebs: Bourousis 12; Asts: Greer 5		Pts: Spanoulis 20; Rebs: Batiste 6 Asts: Spanoulis 7

Helliniko Indoor Arena, Athens
Attendance: 1,720

=== Euroleague 2007–08 ===
==== Regular season ====
	Team	Pld	W	L	PF	PA	Diff
1.	(Russia) CSKA Moscow	14	12	2	1123	942	+181
2.	(Italy) Montepaschi Siena	14	10	4	1098	974	+124
3.	(Spain) TAU Cerámica	14	9	5	1170	1051	+119
4.	(Lithuania) Žalgiris Kaunas	14	8	6	1110	1126	−16
5.	(Greece) Olympiacos	14	7	7	1185	1099	+86
6.	(Slovenia) Olimpija Ljubljana	14	4	10	1030	1147	−117
7.	(Poland) Prokom Trefl Sopot	14	4	10	973	1143	−170
8.	(Italy) VidiVici Bologna	14	2	12	1008	1215	−207

Key to colors
Qualified to Top 16
Eliminated

==== Top 16 ====
	Team	Pld	W	L	PF	PA	Diff
1.	(Israel) Maccabi Tel Aviv	6	4	2	516	496	+20
2.	(Greece) Olympiacos	6	4	2	443	436	+7
3.	(Spain) Real Madrid	6	3	3	489	493	−4
4.	(Lithuania) Žalgiris Kaunas	6	1	5	457	480	−23

- Maccabi win the group on the second tiebreaker of head-to-head point differential against Olympiacos.

Key to colors
Qualified to Quarter-finals
Eliminated

==== Quarter-finals ====
Teams	Agg.	1st Game	2nd Game	3rd Game
(Russia) CSKA Moscow	**2**	74	**83**	**81**
(Greece) Olympiacos	**1**	**76**	73	56
Arena		CSKA Universal Sports Hall, Moscow	Peace and Friendship Stadium, Athens	CSKA Universal Sports Hall, Moscow

Key to colors
Qualified to Final Four 2008
Eliminated

Last match

April 9
18:15 CET

(Report)

**CSKA Moscow (Russia)**	**81**–56	(Greece) Olympiacos
Scoring by quarter: **22**-16, **19**-13, 20-**21**, **20**-6
Pts: Šiškauskas 24; Rebs: Smodiš 6 Asts: Holden 6		Pts: Vasilopoulos 17; Rebs: Printezis 5 Asts: Blakney, Greer 4

CSKA Universal Sports Hall, Moscow
Attendance: 5,000

== See also ==
- 2008–09 Olympiacos B.C. season
