= Kyriakopoulos =

Kyriakopoulos is a surname. Notable people with the surname include:

- Giorgos Kyriakopoulos
- Ioannis Kyriakopoulos
