= Larry Turner (basketball) =

American basketball player and coach

Personal information
- Born: December 29, 1982 (age 43) Milledgeville, Georgia, U.S.
- Listed height: 6 ft 11 in (2.11 m)
- Listed weight: 240 lb (109 kg)

Career information
- High school: Baldwin (Milledgeville, Georgia); Bridgton Academy (Bridgton, Maine)
- College: Oklahoma (2002–2005); Tennessee State (2005–2007)
- NBA draft: 2007: undrafted
- Playing career: 2007–2016
- Position: Center
- Number: 30
- Coaching career: 2016–present

Career history

Playing
- 2007–2008: Fort Wayne Mad Ants
- 2008: Reales de La Vega
- 2009: Gaiteros del Zulia
- 2009: Vermont Frost Heaves
- 2009–2010: Fundación Adepal
- 2010: Halifax Rainmen
- 2010: Odesa
- 2011: Capitanes de Arecibo
- 2011: Lawton-Fort Sill Cavalry
- 2011–2012: Toyama Grouses
- 2012–2013: Apollon Patras
- 2013–2014: Panelefsiniakos
- 2014: CS Energia Rovinari
- 2015: Koroivos
- 2015–2016: APOEL

Coaching
- 2016–present: The Weber School

Career highlights
- Cypriot Cup winner (2016)

Larry Turner (born December 29, 1982) is the high school coach of the Weber School Rams and former professional basketball player.

== Playing career ==
He played college basketball at Tennessee State. He is a 6'11" center and was formerly signed by the Los Angeles Lakers as a free agent.

From mid- to late 2010, he was playing with BC Odesa in the Ukrainian Basketball Super League.

On 30 October 2015, he moved to Cypriot club APOEL and helped his team to win the Cypriot Cup.

== Coaching career ==
Larry Turner retired from playing after the 2015–2016 season and began coaching at The Weber School for the 2016-2017 basketball season.

== Personal life ==
Larry Turner runs a basketball camp called LarryTurnerSports during the summer.
