= David Kyles =

American basketball player

Personal information
- Born: December 7, 1989 (age 36) Dallas, Texas
- Listed height: 6 ft 4 in (1.93 m)
- Listed weight: 195 lb (88 kg)

Career information
- High school: Justin F. Kimball (Dallas, Texas)
- College: Wichita State (2008–2012)
- NBA draft: 2012: undrafted
- Playing career: 2012–present
- Position: Shooting guard

Career history
- 2012–2013: Astrum Levice
- 2012: →Levicki Patrioti
- 2013: Inter Bratislava
- 2013–2014: Tuři Svitavy
- 2014: Panelefsiniakos
- 2014: AEK Athens
- 2014–2015: ETHA Engomis
- 2016: Rustavi

Career highlights
- Cypriot Cup champion (2015); NIT champion (2011); All-MVC Most-Improved Team (2011)

David Kyles (born December 7, 1989) is an American professional basketball player who last played for Rustavi. He played college basketball for Wichita State University.

== Professional career ==
After going undrafted in the 2012 NBA draft, Kyles signed with Astrum Levice of the Czech National Basketball League. He also played for the team's Slovak Extraliga affiliate, BK Levicki Patriot. In January 2013, he left Levice and signed with BK Inter Bratislava where he managed just three games before leaving the team in February.

In September 2013, Kyles signed with Tuři Svitavy for the 2013–14 season. In January 2014, he left Svitavy and signed with Panelefsiniakos of Greece for the rest of the season.

In September 2014, Kyles signed with AEK Athens for the 2014–15 season. He left the club after just four games. On November 20, 2014, he signed with ETHA Engomis of Cyprus for the rest of the season.
