= Alfredos Pilavios =

Greek basketball player (born 1999)

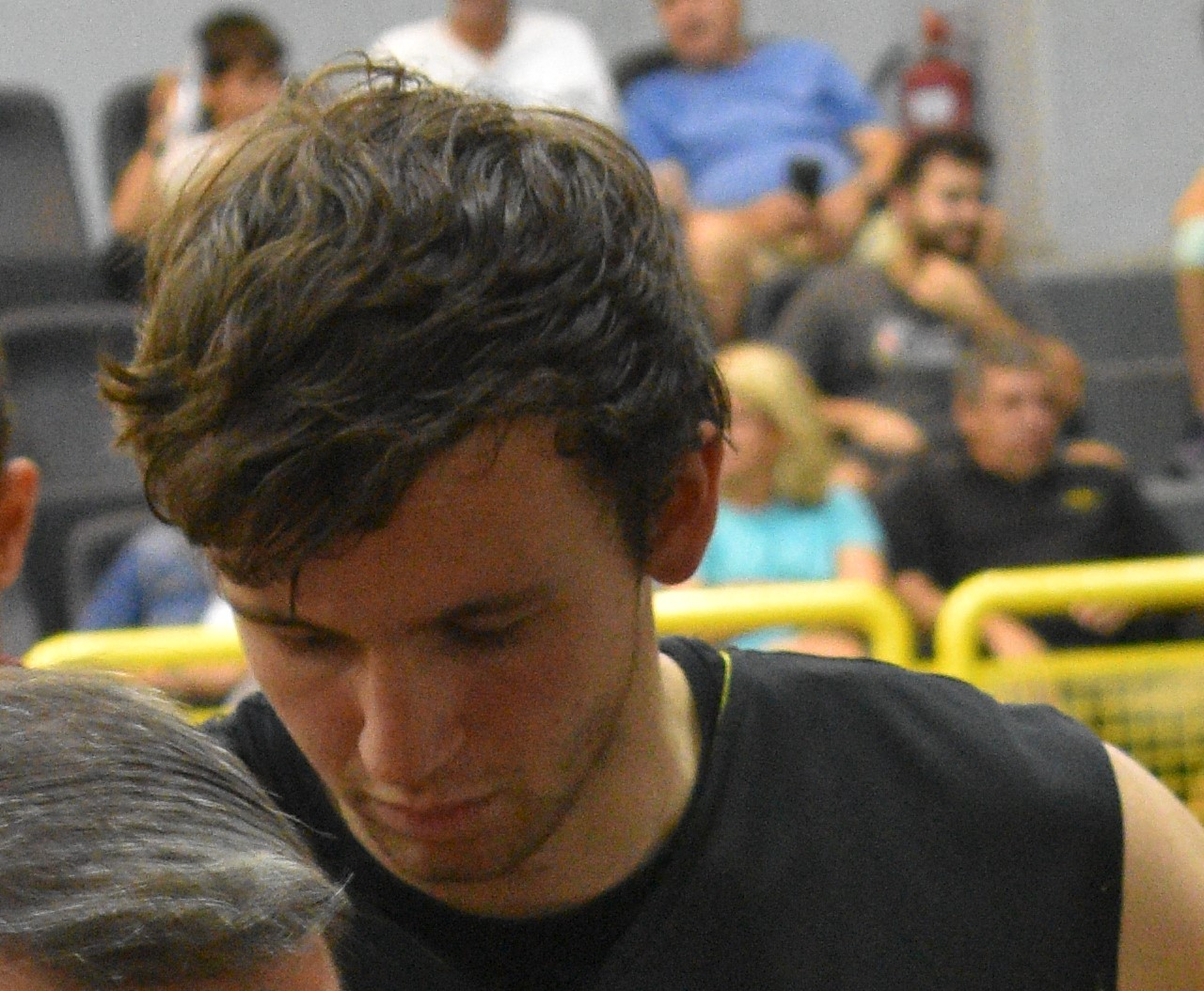
- Pilavios in 2023

Panionios
- Position: Small forward
- League: Greek A2 Elite League

Personal information
- Born: December 15, 1999 (age 26) Athens, Greece
- Listed height: 6 ft 6 in (1.98 m)
- Listed weight: 92 kg (203 lb)

Career information
- High school: Moraitis School (Athens, Greece)
- College: Old Dominion (2017–2021)
- NBA draft: 2021: undrafted
- Playing career: 2021–present

Career history
- 2021–2023: Lavrio
- 2023–2025: AEK Athens
- 2025: Ermis Schimatariou
- 2025–2026: Koroivos Amaliadas
- 2026–present: Panionios

Alfredos "Alfis" Alexandros Pilavios (Greek: Αλφρέδος "Άλφης" Αλέξανδρος Πιλάβιος, (born December 15, 1999) is a Greek professional basketball player for Panionios of the Greek A2 Elite League. He plays at the small forward position. He is the son of Sofoklis Pilavios.

== High school career ==
During high school, Pilavios attended Moraitis School in Athens, Greece.

== College career ==
After high school, Pilavios played college basketball at Old Dominion, from 2017 to 2021. As a senior, he averaged 1.3 points per game.

== Professional career ==
Pilavios began his pro career in the Greek Basket League with Lavrio during the 2021–22 season. He stayed with the club for two years.

On September 17, 2023, Pilavios joined AEK Athens. On August 14, 2024, he renewed his contract with the club for one more season.

On January 11, 2025, Pilavios moved to Ermis Schimatariou of the Greek Elite League.
