= Theodoros Karras =

Greek basketball player

No. 7 – Panionios
- Position: Center
- League: Greek A2 Basket League

Personal information
- Born: December 18, 1997 (age 28) Maroussi, Athens, Greece
- Listed height: 2.09 m (6 ft 10 in)
- Listed weight: 100 kg (220 lb)

Career information
- Playing career: 2015–present

Career history
- 2015–2017: Doukas
- 2017–2020: PAOK Thessaloniki
- 2018–2019: → Karditsa
- 2020–2023: Karditsa
- 2023–2024: Koroivos Amaliadas
- 2024–2025: Eleftheroupoli
- 2025–2026: Psychiko
- 2026–present: Panionios

Career highlights
- Greek 2nd Division champion (2022)
Medals
Representing Greece
Men's basketball
FIBA Europe Under-20 Championship
Gold medal – first place	2017 Greece

Theodoros "Thodoris" Karras (Greek: Θεόδωρος "Θόδωρος" Καρράς; born December 18, 1997) is a Greek professional basketball player for Panionios of the Greek A2 Basket League. At a height of 2.09 metres (6 feet 10 inches) tall, with a 2.30 metres (7 feet 7 inches) wingspan, he plays at the center position.

== Professional career ==
Karras began his professional career in the 2015–16 season, in the Greek 2nd Division, with Doukas.

In the summer of 2017, Karras joined PAOK Thessaloniki of the Greek Basket League and the Basketball Champions League, signing a four-year contract.

On July 28, 2020, he was released from the club and joined Karditsa. During the 2022-2023 Greek Basket League season with Karditsa, in a total of 8 games, Karras averaged 2 points and 1.7 rebounds in under 6 minutes per contest.

On July 19, 2023, Karras signed with Koroivos Amaliadas.

== Greek national team ==
Karras was a member of the Greek junior national teams. With Greece's junior national team, he played at the 2017 FIBA Europe Under-20 Championship, where he won a gold medal. He averaged 9.7 points and 3.6 rebounds per game, at the tournament.
