= Nikos Kalles =

Greek professional basketball player

Nikos Kalles Νίκος Καλλές
No. 15 – ASK Karditsas
- Position: Center
- League: Greek A2 Basket League

Personal information
- Born: April 20, 1987 (age 39) Larissa, Greece
- Listed height: 6 ft 11 in (2.11 m)
- Listed weight: 260 lb (118 kg)

Career information
- Playing career: 2006–present

Career history
- 2006–2009: Iraklis
- 2009–2014: PAOK
- 2014–2015: Panelefsiniakos
- 2015–2017: Aries Trikala
- 2017–2018: Ermis Agias
- 2018–present: ASK Karditsa

Nikos Kalles (Greek: Νίκος Καλλές; born April 20, 1987) is a Greek professional basketball player. He is a 6 ft 11 in (2.11 m) tall center.

== Professional career ==
Kalles started his pro career in 2006, with Iraklis. He moved to PAOK in 2009. He stayed at the club until 2014. In 2014, he signed with Panelefsiniakos.

On October 23, 2015, Kalles signed with Aries Trikala, of the Greek Basket League. After the appointment of Ioannis Kastritis as the team's head coach, he renewed his contract for one more season.
