= Petros Geromichalos =

Greek basketball player (born 1994)

No. 10 – Panionios
- Position: Power forward / center
- League: Greek Basketball League

Personal information
- Born: June 9, 1994 (age 32) Thessaloniki, Greece
- Listed height: 6 ft 8 in (2.03 m)
- Listed weight: 240 lb (109 kg)

Career information
- NBA draft: 2016: undrafted
- Playing career: 2015–present

Career history
- 2015–2019: Promitheas Patras
- 2019–2023: Lavrio
- 2023–2025: Neaniki Estia Megaridas
- 2025–2026: Mykonos
- 2026–present: Panionios BC

Career highlights
- 2x All-Greek Elite League Team (2024, 2025)

Petros Geromichalos (alternate spellings: Peter) (Greek: Πέτρος Γερομίχαλος; born June 9, 1994) is a Greek professional basketball player for Panionios of the Greek Basketball League. He can play at both the power forward and center positions.

== Youth career ==
Geromichalos started playing basketball in Thessaloniki, with the junior teams of Aris Thessaloniki, where he stayed until 2013. With Aris' junior club, he won the Greek junior league.

== Professional career ==
After Aris, Geromichalos joined Machites Doxas Pefkon, where he played in the semi-pro level Greek 3rd division, and became the best scorer of the team. He began his pro career in 2015, when he joined Promitheas Patras of the Greek 2nd Division. With Promitheas, he played in the top-tier level Greek Basket League, for the first time, in the 2016–17 season.

On August 16, 2019, Geromichalos signed with Ionikos Nikaias. His stint in Nikaia was brief, as he was subsequently moved to Lavrio on September 23 of the same year, on a loan spell from Promitheas.

On July 24, 2020, Geromichalos renewed his contract with Lavrio for another season. During the very successful for the club 2020–21 season, he averaged 6.2 points, 3.5 rebounds and 1.9 assists per contest, in 20 games total.

On July 7, 2021, Geromichalos renewed his contract with Lavrio for another year. In 22 league games during the 2021-22 campaign, Geromichalos averaged 4.9 points, 3.2 rebounds and 1.8 assists, playing around 19 minutes per contest.

Geromichalos was named team captain before the start of the 2022–2023 season, following the departures of Vassilis Mouratos and Dimitris Kaklamanakis. In 20 league games, he averaged 6.2 points, 3.3 rebounds and 1.5 assists, playing around 20 minutes per contest.

On July 11, 2023, Geromichalos moved to Enosi Megaridas of the Greek 2nd division.

On June 28, 2025, Geromichalos signed with Mykonos of the Greek Basketball League.

== Personal ==
His twin brother Dimitris is also basketball player.
