= Panagiotis Kafkis =

Greek basketball player and coach

Panagiotis Kafkis Παναγιώτης Καυκής
Ilysiakos
- Title: Head coach
- League: Greek C League

Personal information
- Born: May 8, 1980 (age 46) Athens, Greece
- Listed height: 6 ft 5.75 in (1.97 m)
- Listed weight: 210 lb (95 kg)

Career information
- Playing career: 1998–2018
- Position: Point guard / shooting guard
- Number: 5
- Coaching career: 2019–present

Career history

Playing
- 1998–2003: Ilysiakos
- 2003–2005: Makedonikos
- 2005–2006: Apollon Patras
- 2006–2007: Panionios
- 2007–2008: Olympiacos
- 2008–2010: PAOK
- 2010–2011: Kolossos
- 2011–2012: Peristeri
- 2012–2014: Ilysiakos
- 2014–2015: AENK
- 2015–2017: Doukas
- 2017–2018: Pagrati
- 2018: Ippokratis Kos

Coaching
- 2019–present: Ilysiakos
Medals
Men's basketball
Representing Greece
Mediterranean Games
Silver medal – second place	2005 Almería	Under-26

Panagiotis Kafkis (alternate spelling: Panayiotis) (Greek: Παναγιώτης Καυκής; born May 8, 1980, in Athens, Greece) is a Greek former professional basketball player and coach. During his playing career, at a height of 1.97 m (6 ft 5 3/4 in) tall, he played at the point guard and shooting guard positions.

== Professional career ==
After playing with the youth teams of Aetos Kallitheas, Kafkis started his pro career with Ilysiakos in 1998. In his pro career, Kafkis played with some of the following clubs: Makedonikos, Apollon Patras, Panionios, and Olympiacos. After last playing in 2018, Kafkis announced he was switching from playing to coaching in 2019.

== National team career ==
Kafkis won the silver medal at the 2005 Mediterranean Games, while playing with Greece's under-26 national team.

== Coaching career ==
After he retired from playing professional basketball, Kafkis began his coaching career in 2019, when he became the head coach of the Greek club Ilysiakos.
