= David Teague (basketball) =

American professional basketball player (born 1983)

Personal information
- Born: June 4, 1983 (age 43) Indianapolis, Indiana, U.S.
- Listed height: 6 ft 5 in (1.96 m)
- Listed weight: 196 lb (89 kg)

Career information
- High school: Pike (Indianapolis, Indiana); Bridgton Academy (North Bridgton, Maine)
- College: Purdue (2002–2007)
- NBA draft: 2007: undrafted
- Playing career: 2007–2014
- Position: Shooting guard

Career history
- 2007–2008: AEL Larissa
- 2008–2009: JA Vichy
- 2009–2010: Gießen 46ers
- 2010–2011: Flamengo Basketball
- 2011–2012: Pallacanestro Sant'Antimo
- 2012: Dnipro Dnipropetrovsk
- 2012–2013: Peñarol de Mar del Plata
- 2013: Club Atlético Bohemios
- 2014: Cafeteros de Armenia
- 2014: Fort Wayne Mad Ants

Career highlights
- LNB All-Star (2013); Second-team All-Big Ten (2007)

David Boyd Teague III (born June 4, 1983) is an American professional basketball player who last played for the Fort Wayne Mad Ants of the NBA Development League. He played college basketball for Purdue University.

== High school career ==
Teague attended Pike High School in Indianapolis, Indiana where he played alongside future Notre Dame star Chris Thomas. As a senior in 2000–01, he averaged 15.3 points, 4.7 rebounds, 1.3 assists and 1.2 steals per game. He went on to spend a prep year at Bridgton Academy in 2001–02.

== College career ==
In his freshman season at Purdue, Teague appeared in 30 games with two starts and set a freshman record for three-point field goals in a season, with 35. He averaged 5.7 points and 2.2 rebounds per game.

In his sophomore season, Teague started all 31 games and ranked second on the team in scoring and rebounding, averaging 11.5 points and 5.2 rebounds per game. He scored in double figures in 14 of last 17 games of the 2003–04 season.

In his junior season, Teague ranked 13th in the Big Ten in scoring, 12th in rebounding and fourth in three-point field goals made. In 26 games (all starts), he averaged 14.0 points, 5.5 rebounds and 1.2 assists per game.

On November 14, 2005, Teague suffered a torn ACL in his right knee during practise and subsequently missed the entire 2005–06 season. After gaining a medical hardship, he returned to Purdue for his redshirted senior year in 2006–07 where he averaged 14.3 points, 5.0 rebounds and 2.0 assists in 34 games (all starts). His return helped lead Purdue to the second round of the NCAA Tournament, eventually losing to NCAA champions, Florida. On February 15, 2007, he scored a career high 32 points against Indiana.

== Professional career ==
After going undrafted in the 2007 NBA draft, Teague signed with A.E.L. 1964 B.C. of Greece for the 2007–08 season.

In 2008, Teague signed with JA Vichy of France for the 2008–09 season.

In August 2009, Teague signed with Gießen 46ers of Germany for the 2009–10 season. In January 2010, he suffered a season-ending injury. On March 19, 2010, he parted ways with Gießen.

In December 2010, Teague signed with Flamengo Basketball of Brazil for the rest of the 2010–11 season.

On August 7, 2011, Teague signed with Pallacanestro Sant'Antimo of Italy for the 2011–12 season. In February 2012, he left Pallacanestro and signed with Dnipro Dnipropetrovsk of Ukraine for the rest of the season.

In August 2012, Teague signed with Peñarol de Mar del Plata of Argentina for the 2012–13 season.

In November 2013, Teague joined Club Atlético Bohemios or Uruguay but later left in December after just five games. In March 2014, he joined Cafeteros de Armenia of Colombia for the 2014 Liga DirecTV season.

On November 2, 2014, Teague was acquired by the Fort Wayne Mad Ants. On December 20, 2014, he was waived by the Mad Ants after appearing in five games.

== Personal ==
Teague is the son of David Teague Jr. and Patrice Kendrick, and has one brother, Shawn, and one sister, Darrice. He is also the cousin of NBA players Jeff and Marquis Teague. He has two sons, David Teague IV, and Ronald Ward; and has 1 daughter, Ashiyah Teague.
