= Ioannis Kyriakopoulos =

Greek basketball player

Ioannis Kyriakopoulos (alternate spellings: Giannis, Yiannis, Yannis, Kiriakopoulos) (Greek: Γιάννης Κυριακόπουλος; born June 6, 1983) is a Greek professional basketball player. He is 1.88 m (6 ft 2 in) in height, and he plays at the point guard position.

== Professional career ==
In his pro career, Kyriakopoulos has played with the Greek Basket League clubs Panionios, AEL 1964, AEK Athens, and Panelefsiniakos.

He was named the Greek 2nd Division Guard of the Year for the 2005–06 season, by the website Eurobasket.com. In the 2013–14 season, he played with Doxa Lefkadas in the Greek National B League (the 3rd level of Greece), and won the B League's north division championship with them.

On September 11, 2020, Kyriakopoulos signed with Ermis Schimatari of the Greek B Basket League.
