= Kevin Langford =

American basketball player

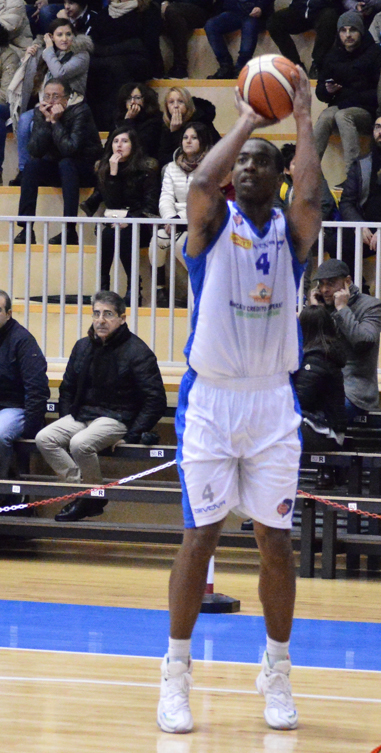
- Langford in action with Agropoli.

BBC Monthey
- Position: Power forward / center
- League: Swiss Basketball League

Personal information
- Born: December 21, 1985 (age 40) Fort Worth, Texas
- Listed height: 6 ft 8.5 in (2.04 m)
- Listed weight: 245 lb (111 kg)

Career information
- High school: North Crowley (Fort Worth, Texas)
- College: California (2004–2005); TCU (2006–2009)
- NBA draft: 2009: undrafted
- Playing career: 2009–present

Career history
- 2009–2010: Paderborn
- 2010–2011: Debrecen
- 2011–2012: Navarra
- 2012–2013: Kolossos Rodou
- 2013–2014: Panionios
- 2014–2015: PAOK Thessaloniki
- 2015–2016: Paris-Levallois
- 2016: Antwerp Giants
- 2016–2017: Basket Agropoli
- 2017–2018: Instituto
- 2018: Koroivos Amaliadas
- 2018–2020: KTP Basket
- 2020–2021: Charilaos Trikoupis
- 2021–2022: APOP Paphos
- 2022: Ionikos Nikaias
- 2022–present: BBC Monthey-Chablais

Career highlights
- Second-team All-Mountain West (2009); Third-team All-Mountain West (2008)

Kevin Langford (born December 21, 1985) is an American professional basketball player for BBC Monthey-Chablais of the Swiss Basketball League. He is a 2.04 m (6 ft 8½ in) tall power forward-center.

== College career ==
Langford played college basketball at Cal, with the Golden Bears, from 2004 to 2005. He then played at TCU, with the Horned Frogs, from 2005 to 2009.

== Professional career ==
Langford started his pro career in 2009, with the German League club Paderborn Baskets. He moved to the Hungarian League club Debrecen in 2010. In 2011, he joined the Spanish 2nd Division club Basket Navarra Club.

In 2012, he signed with the Greek League club Kolossos Rodou, and in 2013, he moved to the Greek club Panionios. He moved to the Greek club PAOK in 2014.

In August, 2015, he signed with Paris-Levallois of France. On January 19, 2016, he left Paris and signed with Antwerp Giants of the Belgian League.

On September 6, 2016, he signed with Italian club Basket Agropoli of the Serie A2 Basket. In October 2017, he signed with Argentine club Instituto of the Liga Nacional de Básquet. On March 4, 2018, Langford left Instituto and joined Koroivos of the Greek Basket League.

Langford spent the 2019–20 season with KTP Basket of the Finnish Korisliiga, averaging 11.7 points, 5.3 rebounds and 3.0 assists per game. On October 4, 2020, he signed with Charilaos Trikoupis of the Greek Basket League.

After a stint in Cyprus with APOP Paphos, Langford returned to Greece on January 10, 2022, signing with Ionikos Nikaias for the rest of the season. On March 10 of the same year, he parted ways with the club, having averaged only 2.7 points and 1.3 rebounds per game. On March 14, Langford signed with BBC Monthey-Chablais of the Swiss Basketball League.

== Personal life ==
Langford's older brother, Keith Langford, was also a professional basketball player. His uncle, Charles Taylor, played in the NFL, with the Kansas City Chiefs and Denver Broncos.
