= Ilysiakos B.C. =

Ilysiakos
- Leagues: Greek C Basket League; Greek Cup
- Founded: 1968; 58 years ago
- Arena: "Antonis Fotsis" Indoor Hall
- Capacity: 1,700
- Location: Ilisia, Zografou, Athens, Greece
- Team colors: Gold and Black
- President: Pantelis Gampierakis
- Head coach: Panagiotis Kafkis
- Championships: 2 Greek 2nd Division Championships; 1 Greek 3rd Division Championship; 1 Greek 4th Division Championship
- Website: ilisiakos.gr
Home	Away

Ilysiakos B.C. (Greek: Ηλυσιακός Κ.Α.Ε.) is a Greek professional basketball team that is located in the Ilisia neighborhood of Zografou, Athens, Greece. The club's name is said to be a reference to Elysium, which is why the club's name and logo beings with a Greek alphabet Η, instead of an Ι, even though the name of Ilissia, where the club is based, begins with an Ι in Greek. However, when the name is translated into the English alphabet, the H becomes an I.

The club is known for being based mostly on Greek players and Greek coaches, and for developing young players.

== History ==
The parent athletic sports club, Ilysiakos Athlitikos Omilos (Greek: Ηλυσιακός Αθλητικός Όμιλος), was founded in 1927. The basketball team of Ilysiakos was established in 1968. In the 1986–87 season, Ilysiakos participated for the first time in the top Greek Basket League, and stayed there for two straight seasons. Following the 1987–88 season, the team got relegated to the Greek 2nd Division.

From 1988 to 2003, the club was competing in the Greek second and third divisions. However, the club had its biggest success with its participation in the final four of the Greek Cup in 1995, where the team finished in 4th place. In the year 2003, the club got promoted to the first division again, but was once again relegated to the second division after the 2003–04 season.

The club's second return to the first division, in the 2009–10 season, was much more successful, as Ilysiakos played in the top division for 5 consecutive seasons. During that time, players like Vonteego Cummings, Brent Petway, Terrell Stoglin, and Aloysius Anagonye played with the club. In this same era of the club, Nikos Chatzis, who was a member of the senior men's Greek national team, and won several titles in his playing career: 2 Greek Cups (2000, 2001), the FIBA Saporta Cup (2000), and the Greek League championship (2002), became the captain of the team. In this same time, Panagiotis Kafkis and Georgios Apostolidis, who also represented Greece, were also members of the team.

== Arena ==
Ilysaiakos plays its home games at the 1,700 seat Antonis Fotsis Indoor Hall. The arena is named in honor of Ilysiakos player Antonis Fotsis.

== Club titles and honors ==
- 2× Greek 2nd Division Champion: (1985, 1986)
- Greek 4th Division Champion: (2001)
- Greek 3rd Division Champion: (2002)

== Roster ==
Note: Flags indicate national team eligibility at FIBA-sanctioned events. Players may hold other non-FIBA nationalities not displayed.

Ilysiakos B.C. roster
Players
Coaches

Pos.	No.	Nat.	Name	Ht.	Wt.	Age
PF	6	(Greece)	Fotsis, Antonis	2.08 m (6 ft 10 in)	113 kg (249 lb)	45 – 1 April 1981
SG	11	(Greece)	Pappas, Nikos	1.95 m (6 ft 5 in)	100 kg (220 lb)	36 – 11 July 1990

Head coach

- (Greece) Panagiotis Kafkis

Legend

- (C) Team captain
- Injured

- Roster
Updated: December 15, 2019

== Notable players ==
Note: Flags indicate national team eligibility at FIBA-sanctioned events. Players may hold other non-FIBA nationalities not displayed.

Criteria

To appear in this section a player must have either:

- Set a club record or won an individual award while at the club
- Played at least one official international match for their national team at any time
- Played at least one official NBA match at any time.

- Tasos Antonakis
- Georgios Apostolidis
- Ioannis Athanasoulas
- Ioannis Athinaiou
- Marios Batis
- Georgios Bogris
- Kostas Charissis
- Nikos Chatzis
- Periklis Dorkofikis
- Petros Fikaris
- Antonis Fotsis
- Andreas Glyniadakis
- Vassilis Goumas
- Stelios Ioannou
- Panagiotis Kafkis
- Andreas Kanonidis
- Sakis Karidas
- Leonidas Kaselakis
- Georgios Kastrinakis
- Dimitrios Kokolakis
- Dimitrios Kompodietas
- Alexis Kyritsis
- Nikos Liakopoulos
- Marios Matalon
- Charis Papageorgiou
- Nikos Papanikolopoulos
- Andreas Papantoniou
- Nondas Papantoniou
- Michael Paragyios
- Stratos Perperoglou
- Alekos Petroulas
- Leonidas Skoutaris
- Ioannis Sioutis
- Dimitrios Tsarouchas
- Kyriakos Vidas
- Anatoly Zourpenko
- Brett Eppehimer
- Conor Grace
- Kyle Johnson
- Grega Mali
- Darius Maskoliūnas
- Harding Nana
- Riste Stefanov
- Miroslav Todić
- Aloysius Anagonye
- Jimmy Baxter
- Brian Butch
- Warren Carter
- Vonteego Cummings
- Willie Deane
- Tyrone Grant
- Othello Hunter
- Art Long
- Dominique Morrison
- Brent Petway
- Terrell Stoglin

== Head coaches ==
Head Coach	Years
(Greece) / (United States) Christos Kefalos	1985–1987
(Greece) Vassilis Fragkias	1994–1995, 2010–2011
(Greece) Memos Ioannou
(Greece) Georgios Kalafatakis	2005
(Greece) Kostas Flevarakis	2010–2012
(Greece) Dimitris Papanikolaou	2012
(Greece) Panagiotis Kafkis	2019–present
