= Danny Yoshikawa =

American basketball coach

Oregon State Beavers
- Position: Associate head coach
- Conference: Pac-12

Personal information
- Born: San Jose, California, U.S.

Career information
- College: University of California, Davis; San Jose State University

Career history

Coaching
- 2001-2007: West Valley College
- 2007-2008: UC Santa Barbara (assistant)
- 2008-2012: San Francisco (AHC)
- 2013-2015: Hyogo Storks
- 2015-2019: Saint Mary's (assistant)
- 2019–2026: West Valley College
- 2026–present: Oregon State (AHC)

Danny Yoshikawa (ダニー・ヨシカワ, Dani Yoshikawa) is an American basketball coach who is currently the associate head coach for the Oregon State Beavers of the Pac-12 Conference.

== Coaching career ==
In March 2026, Yoshikawa was hired as the associate head coach at Oregon State University under new head coach Justin Joyner. He had previously served alongside Joyner as an assistant coach at Saint Mary's College.

== Head coaching record ==
Legend
Regular season	G	Games coached	W	Games won	L	Games lost	W–L %	Win–loss %
Playoffs	PG	Playoff games	PW	Playoff wins	PL	Playoff losses	PW–L %	Playoff win–loss %

Team	Year	G	W	L	W–L%	Finish	PG	PW	PL	PW–L%	Result
Hyogo Storks	2013-14	54	9	45	.167	5th in Western	-	-	-	–	-
Hyogo Storks	2014	18	10	8	.556	Fired	-	-	-	–	-
