= Georgios Apostolidis =

Greek professional basketball player

Georgios Apostolidis Γιώργος Αποστολίδης
Ahagia
- Position: Shooting guard / small forward

Personal information
- Born: June 22, 1984 (age 42) Thessaloniki, Greece
- Listed height: 6 ft 6.75 in (2.00 m)
- Listed weight: 220 lb (100 kg)

Career information
- Playing career: 2000–present

Career history
- 2000–2003: PAOK
- 2003–2005: Iraklis Thessaloniki
- 2005–2007: Olympia Larissa
- 2007–2008: Panellinios
- 2008–2009: AEL 1964
- 2009–2010: Trikala 2000
- 2010–2011: PAOK
- 2011–2013: Ilysiakos
- 2013–2014: Panathinaikos
- 2014–2015: Doxa Lefkadas
- 2015–2016: Iraklis Thessaloniki
- 2016–2017: Holargos
- 2017–2018: Apollon Patras
- 2018–2020: Gefyra Patras
- 2020–present: Ahagia

Career highlights
- Greek League champion (2014); Greek Cup winner (2014)
Medals
Men's basketball
Representing Greece
FIBA U21 World Cup
Silver medal – second place	2005 Argentina	Under-21
FIBA U19 World Cup
Bronze medal – third place	2003 Greece	Under-19
FIBA Europe U18 Championship
Bronze medal – third place	2002 Germany	Under-18

Georgios Apostolidis (alternate spelling: Giorgos) (Greek: Γιώργος Αποστολίδης; born June 22, 1984) is a Greek professional basketball player. He is 2.00 m (6 ft 6 3/4 in) tall. He can play at the point guard, shooting guard, point forward, and small forward positions.

== Professional career ==
Apostolidis has played with clubs such as: PAOK, Iraklis, Olympia Larissa, Panellinios, AEL 1964 GS, Trikala 2000, Ilysiakos, and Panathinaikos in his professional career. Apostolidis signed with Olympiacos Piraeus, in July 2007, and he was loaned to Panellinios In October 2014, he signed a contract with Doxa Lefkadas. He appeared in 23 games for the team, averaging 11.9 points, 4.3 rebounds, 3.3 assists, and 1.5 steals per game, in 30.4 minutes per game.

In September 2015, Apostolidis signed with Iraklis Thessaloniki of the Greek 2nd Division.

== National team career ==
Apostolidis was a member of the Greek junior national teams. He won the bronze medal at the 2002 FIBA Europe Under-18 Championship, the bronze medal at the 2003 FIBA Under-19 World Championship, and the silver medal at the 2005 FIBA Under-21 World Championship. He also played at the 2004 FIBA Europe Under-20 Championship.

== Awards and honors ==
=== Club career ===
- Greek League Champion: (2014)
- Greek Cup Winner: (2014)
