= Guy-Marc Michel =

French professional basketball player (born 1988)

No. 4 – Hermine de Nantes Atlantique
- Position: Center
- League: LNB Pro B

Personal information
- Born: October 4, 1988 (age 38) La Trinité, Martinique
- Listed height: 7 ft 1 in (2.16 m)
- Listed weight: 280 lb (127 kg)

Career information
- College: Northern Idaho (2008–2010)
- Playing career: 2008–present

Career history
- 2008: SLUC Nancy
- 2011–2013: KAOD
- 2013–2014: Panionios
- 2014–2015: KAOD
- 2015–2016: Lille Métropole
- 2016–present: Hermine de Nantes Atlantique

Guy-Marc Michel (born October 4, 1988) is a French professional basketball player. He is a 2.16 m (7 ft 1 in) tall center.

== College career ==
Michel played college basketball at Northern Idaho College from 2008 to 2010. He also enrolled to play college basketball at Indiana, with the Indiana Hoosiers, from 2010 to 2011, but he was declared ineligible by the NCAA, due to having previously played professionally in France.

== Professional career ==
Michel started his pro career in 2008, during the 2007–08 season, with the French League club SLUC Nancy. He then moved to the US to play college basketball. After playing college basketball in the US, he joined the Greek League club KAOD in 2011.

In 2013, he signed with the Greek club Panionios. He moved back to KAOD in 2014.
