= Ioannis Athanasoulas =

Greek basketball player

Ioannis Athanasoulas Γιάννης Αθανασούλας
No. 15 – Psychiko
- Position: Small forward / power forward
- League: Greek A2 Basket League

Personal information
- Born: January 21, 1987 (age 39) Athens, Greece
- Listed height: 6 ft 7.5 in (2.02 m)
- Listed weight: 235 lb (107 kg)

Career information
- Playing career: 2005–present

Career history
- 2005–2007: AEK Athens
- 2007–2010: Ilysiakos
- 2010–2014: Panionios
- 2014–2015: Panelefsiniakos
- 2015–2016: Apollon Patras
- 2016–2017: Lavrio
- 2017–2019: Iraklis
- 2019–2020: Koroivos Amaliadas
- 2020–2021: Panerithraikos
- 2021–present: Psychiko

Ioannis Athanasoulas (alternate spellings: Giannis, Yiannis, Yannis, Athanassoulas) (Greek: Γιάννης Αθανασούλας; born January 21, 1987) is a Greek professional basketball player for Psychiko of the Greek A2 Basket League. He is a 2.02 m (6 ft 7 1/2 in) tall small forward–power forward.

== Professional career ==
Athanasoulas began his pro career with the Greek 1st Division club AEK Athens in 2005. In 2007, he moved to the Greek club Ilysiakos, which was playing in the Greek 2nd Division at the time. In 2010, he joined the Greek club Panionios and 4 seasons later moved to Panelefsiniakos. In 2015, he moved to Apollon Patras. In 2016, he moved to Lavrio. In 2017, he moved to Iraklis Thessaloniki.

== National team career ==
Athanasoulas was a member of the Greek junior national teams. With the junior national teams of Greece, he played at the 2003 FIBA Europe Under-16 Championship, and the 2007 FIBA Europe Under-20 Championship.
