= A.E.L. 1964 B.C. =

Men's basketball team in Greece

AEL
- Nickname: Vasilissa Tou Kampou (Queen of The Lowland)
- Leagues: Thessaly league ESKATH
- Founded: 1993
- History: AEL 1964 (1993–2006); AEL G.S. (2006–2009); G.S. Olympia Larissas (2009–2010); AEL 1964 (2010–Present)
- Arena: Larissa Neapolis Arena
- Capacity: 5,500
- Location: Larissa, Greece
- Team colors: Maroon and White
- Website: aelbasket.gr
| Home | Away |

A.E.L. 1964 B.C. (Greek: Α.Ε.Λ. 1964 K.A.E.) is a Greek professional basketball team.

The club is located in Larissa, Greece, a city that is part of the Thessaly periphery. The team is a part of the Athletic Union of Larissa multi-sports club. When the team competed in the top-tier Greek League, they played their home games at the Larissa Neapolis Arena.

== Team's names ==
- AEL 1964: (1993–2006)
  Team Colors: Maroon and White
- AEL GS: (2006–2009)
  Team Colors: Maroon and White
- A.E. Larissa: (2010–Present)
  Team Colors: Maroon and White

== History ==
The Greek basketball club Gymnastikos S. Larissas was founded in Larissa in 1928. In 2006, Gymnastikos merged with the multi-sports club of Athletic Union of Larissa, which did not have a fully professional level men's basketball section at the time. Gymnastikos' basketball team then became the new basketball section for AEL 1964, under the new name of AEL 1964 G.S., with the newly merged club retaining all of the rights and history of the original club, G.S. Larissas. The colours were maroon and white like AEL, while the new club carried AEL's badge also.

In 2009, AEL 1964 G.S. then merged with another basketball club from Larissa, Olympia Larissa, to form G.S. Olympia Larissa. G.S. Olympia Larissa finished last in the Greek Basket League 2009–10 season, and that combined with financial problems, caused it to be relegated down to the Greek lower divisions. As a result, in 2010, the two clubs of AEL 1964 and Olimpia Larissa, separated back from each other, after having merged.

AEL then continued on for the 2010–11 season, under the name of AEL 1964, playing in the Greek lower divisions. A new independent club based on the original Gymnastikos S. Larissas basketball section, called Nea Gymnastikos S. Larissas, was also formed in 2011. This was because 5 years time had passed since the original Gymnastikos club had merged with AEL 1964, and in the original merger agreement, it allowed for another new club to form locally using the Gymnastikos name and logo, after 5 years had passed.

== Honours ==
Thessaly League ESKATH:

- Winners (4): 2000, 2002, 2013, 2023

== Arena ==
AEL plays their home games at the Larissa Neapolis Arena, which can seat up to 5,500 people for basketball games.

== Roster ==
A.E.L.1964 B.C. roster
Players
Coaches

| Pos. | No. | Nat. | Name | Ht. | Wt. | Age |
|---|---|---|---|---|---|---|
| PG | 5 | (Greece) | Deligiorgis, Apollon | 1.92 m (6 ft 4 in) | | 33 – 3 July 1993 |
| SF | 8 | (Greece) | Koutinas, Sakis | 1.98 m (6 ft 6 in) |
| G/F | 9 | (Greece) | Kouvelas, Alexandros | 1.94 m (6 ft 4 in) |
| PF | 10 | (Greece) | Tsoutsos, Nikos | 2.02 m (6 ft 8 in) | 105 kg (231 lb) | 43 – 30 December 1982 |
| PG | 11 | (Greece) | Politis, Michalis | 1.90 m (6 ft 3 in) | | 38 – 21 September 1988 |
| G/F | 14 | (Greece) | Papachristos, Giannis | 1.92 m (6 ft 4 in) | | 46 – 19 January 1980 |
| PF | 15 | (Greece) | Staboulis, Giannis | 2.02 m (6 ft 8 in) |
| PF | 18 | (Greece) | Maltetsos, Giannis | 2.04 m (6 ft 8 in) | | 41 – 14 September 1985 |

Head coach

Avraam Papadopoulos

Legend

- (C) Team captain
- Injured

- Roster
Updated: 2/8/2016

== Notable players ==
Note: Flags indicate national team eligibility at FIBA-sanctioned events. Players may hold other non-FIBA nationalities not displayed.

Criteria

To appear in this section a player must have either:

- Set a club record or won an individual award while at the club
- Played at least one official international match for their national team at any time
- Played at least one official NBA match at any time.

- Nestoras Kommatos
- Giannis Kyriakopoulos
- Dimitris Bogdanos
- Giorgos Apostolidis
- Markos Kolokas
- Nikos Papanikolopoulos
- Michalis Tsairelis
- Fotios Lampropoulos
- Sotirios Manolopoulos
- Marios Matalon
- Theodoros Zaras
- Zlatko Bolić
- Rudy Mbemba
- Amit Tamir
- Héctor Romero
- Sammy Mejia
- Arthur Lee
- Rod Brown
- Torin Francis
- Billy Keys
- David Teague
- Lance Williams

== Head coaches ==
- Yannis Christopoulos

== See also ==
- Gymnastikos S. Larissas 1928 B.C.
- G.S. Olympia Larissa B.C.
