= Mark Payne (basketball) =

American professional basketball player (born 1988)

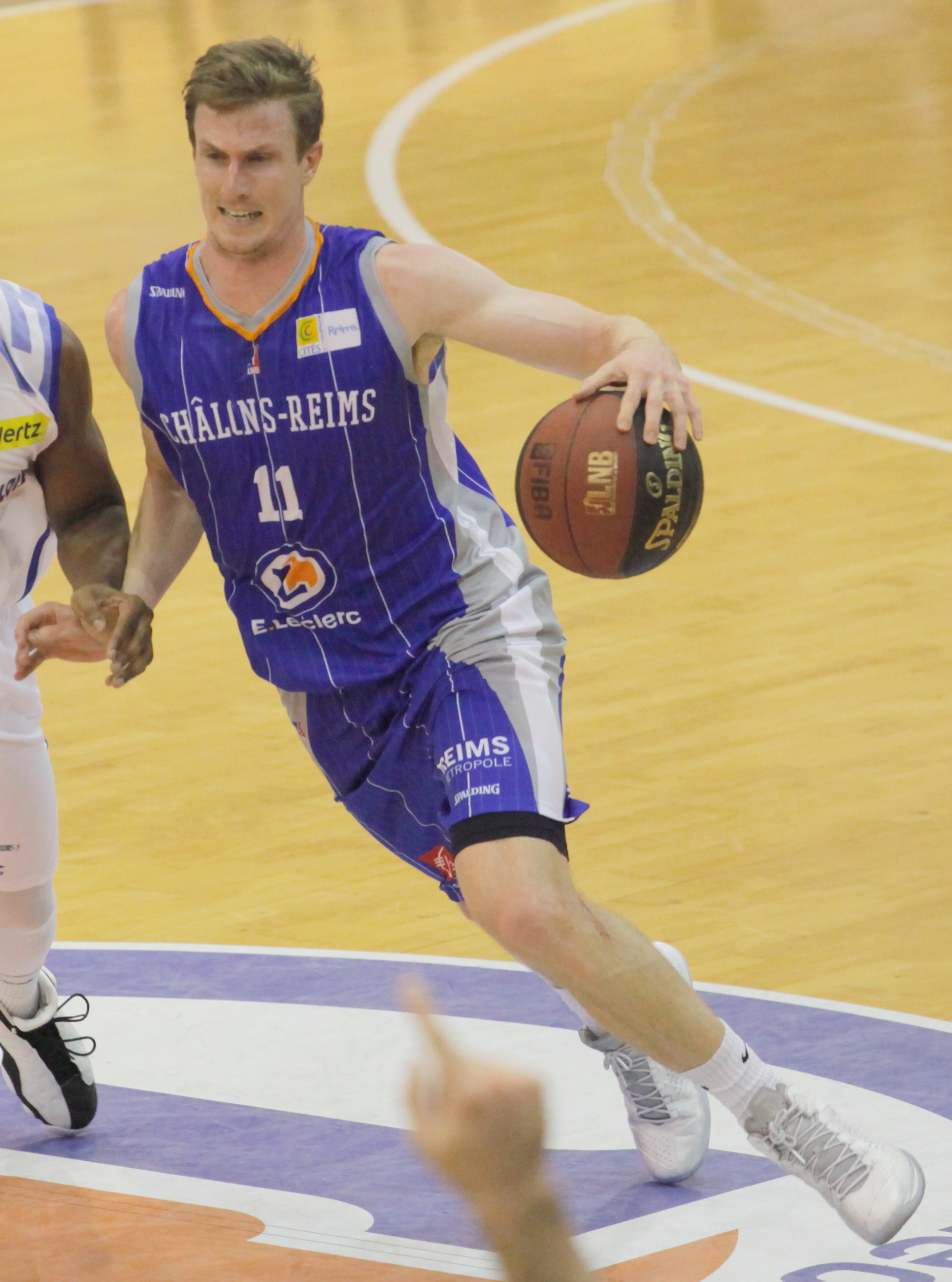
- Mark Payne

Personal information
- Born: June 17, 1988 (age 38) Lubbock, Texas
- Listed height: 6 ft 8 in (2.03 m)
- Listed weight: 230 lb (104 kg)

Career information
- High school: St. Mary's (Stockton, California)
- College: UC Davis (2006–2011)
- NBA draft: 2011: undrafted
- Playing career: 2011–2017
- Position: Guard / forward

Career history
- 2011: Axarquía
- 2011–2012: Unicaja Málaga
- 2012–2013: Panionios
- 2013–2014: PAOK
- 2014–2015: Champagne Châlons-Reims
- 2015–2016: Limoges CSP
- 2016–2017: Champagne Châlons-Reims

Career highlights
- French League All-Star (2017)

Mark Christopher Payne (born June 17, 1988) is an American professional basketball player. He is left-handed, 6 ft 8 in (2.03 m) tall, and he can play as either a shooting guard-small forward, or as a point guard-point forward.

== College career ==
After playing high school basketball at St. Mary's, in Stockton, California, Payne played college basketball at the University of California, Davis, with the UC Davis Aggies.

== Professional career ==
Payne began his pro career in 2011, with the Spanish Second Division club Axarquía. He moved to the Spanish First Division club Málaga during the 2011–12 season. He signed with the Greek League club, Panionios, in the summer of 2012. In September 2013, he signed with PAOK Thessaloniki for the 2013–14 season.

In June 2014, he signed a one-year deal with Chalons-Reims of the French LNB Pro A. On June 30, 2015, he signed a two-year deal with Limoges CSP.
