= K.A.O.D. B.C. =

KAOD
- Nickname: Πράσινοι Διάβολοι (Green Devils)
- Leagues: Greek 3rd Division
- Founded: 1989
- Dissolved: 2015
- History: KAOD B.C. 1989
- Arena: Dimitris Krachtidis Indoor Hall
- Capacity: 1,700
- Location: Drama, Greece
- Championships: 2 Greek 2nd Division Championships
- Website: kaodramas.gr
Home	Away

KAOD B.C. (Greek: ΚΑΟΔ K.A.E.) is a professional basketball club that is based in Drama, Greece. The club has competed in the top-tier level Greek Basket League, in several different seasons.

== Logos ==
(KAOD's official logo 2011–2014).

(KAOD's official logo 2014–2015).

== History ==
In the 2000–01 season, KAOD won the championship of the Greek 2nd Division. In the 2001–02 season, KAOD played in the Greek top-tier level league, the Greek 1st Division. KAOD also won the Greek 2nd Division championship in the 2010–11 season. After the 2014–15 season, KAOD withdrew from the top-tier level Greek Basket League.

== Championships ==
- Greek A2 League:
  - Champions (2): 2001, 2011

== Notable players ==
Note: Flags indicate national team eligibility at FIBA-sanctioned events. Players may hold other non-FIBA nationalities not displayed.

Criteria

To appear in this section a player must have either:

- Set a club record or won an individual award while at the club
- Played at least one official international match for their national team at any time
- Played at least one official NBA match at any time.

- Vangelis Vourtzoumis
- Kostas Charalampidis
- Sakis Karidas
- Kostas Kakaroudis
- Ioannis Athinaiou
- Vladimir Petrović-Stergiou
- Vangelis Margaritis
- Linos Chrysikopoulos
- Alexandros Sigkounas
- Theodoros Zaras
- Guy-Marc Michel
- Edin Bavčić
- Nikola Marković
- Filip Čović
- Dejan Borovnjak
- Andrés Guibert
- Ryan Lorthridge
- Lazeric Jones
- Julian Vaughn
- J'Covan Brown (2013–14)
- Robert Loe

== Head coaches ==
- Kostas Missas
- Nenad Marković
