= Panionios B.C. =

Panionios BC
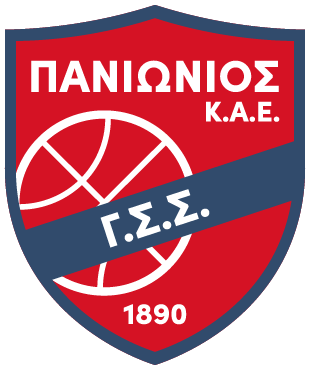
- Nickname: Κυανέρυθροι (Blue-reds); Ιστορικός (Historic); Πάνθηρες (Panthers)
- Leagues: Greek Elite League
- Founded: 1919
- History: Panionios G.S.S. (1919–present)
- Arena: Glyfada Makis Liougas Sportshall
- Capacity: 3,500
- Location: Glyfada, Greece
- Team colors: Red and Blue
- President: Thodoris Mikropoulos; Panagiotis Iliadis
- Team manager: Fanis Christodoulou
- Head coach: Nikos Karagiannis
- Championships: Greek Cup (1)
- Retired numbers: 8, 4
- Website: pgssbc.gr
Home	Away

Panionios B.C. (Greek: Πανιώνιος KAE), known in European competitions as Panionios Athens is the Greek professional basketball club that is based in Nea Smyrni, and that plays its home games in Glyfada, Greece. The club is also widely known as Πανιώνιος Γυμναστικός Σύλλογος Σμύρνης, or Panionios Gymnastikos Syllogos Smyrnis, which is the Pan-Ionian Gymnastic Club of Smyrna. This is usually abbreviated to the club name of Πανιώνιος Γ.Σ.Σ. Panionios B.C. is the basketball department of the Panionios Gymnastic Club that is based in Nea Smyrni.

Panionios B.C. has been a long-time club of the top-tier level Greek Basket League, which is considered one of the best national domestic basketball leagues in Europe. Panionios B.C. has also competed in the European-wide top-tier level EuroLeague. For sponsorship reasons, the club has also been known as Panionios On Telecoms and Panionios Forthnet, as well as several other sponsorship names.

Some of the well-known players that have played with the club over the years have included: Faidon Matthaiou, Takis Koroneos, Makis Dendrinos, Dimitris Fosses, Kostas Missas, Fanis Christodoulou, Giannis Giannoulis, Boban Janković, P. J. Brown, Panagiotis Giannakis, Henry Turner, Thurl Bailey, Travis Mays, Žarko Paspalj, Byron Dinkins, Mitchell Wiggins, Theo Papaloukas, Jure Zdovc, Laurent Sciarra, Nikos Chatzis, Georgios Sigalas, Angelos Koronios, Dimos Dikoudis, Nikos Oikonomou, Georgios Diamantopoulos, Stratos Perperoglou, Michalis Pelekanos, Ender Arslan, Miloš Vujanić, Alex Stepheson, Errick McCollum, and Tyrese Rice, among others.

== Logos ==
(The official logo of Panionios' parent club.)

(The official logo of Panionios' basketball club.Logo until 2024)

== History ==
=== Early years ===
The basketball clubs' parent athletic union, the Panionios Gymnastic Club, was founded in 1890, in İzmir, Ottoman Empire (located today in the modern country of Turkey), making it one of the oldest sporting clubs in Europe. The sporting clubs' basketball department was founded in 1919. After the Greek military suffered defeat in the Greco-Turkish War in 1922, the club was transferred to the Athenian suburb of Nea Smyrni, in Greece.

The basketball department, Panionios B.C., began participation in the Greek Basket League starting in the 1928–29 season, and finished in second place in the league that year. Panionios B.C. finished in third place in the league the next year.

=== Rise of the club to prominence in Greek basketball ===
Panionios B.C. competed in the top-tier Greek basketball league, in consecutive years, from the 1981–82 season until the 2014–15 season. In the 1986–87 season, Panionios played in the championship finals series of the Greek League, losing out to Aris, and their two Greek basketball legends Nikos Galis and Panagiotis Giannakis (Giannakis would later go on to play for Panionios). In 1991, led by Fanis Christodoulou, the team won the Greek Cup title, by defeating PAOK by a score of 73–70. Panionios also played in the finals game of the Greek Cup in both 1977 and 1995. Ιn the 1993–94 season, after an exciting run in the European 3rd-tier level FIBA Korać Cup, and after scoring a couple of wins against Maccabi Tel Aviv in the quarterfinals, Panionios reached the semifinals, and played against PAOK Bravo. This marked the first civil conflict between Greek basketball clubs in European-wide competitions, ever.

The club finished in 3rd place in the Greek League in the 1995–96 season, under their head coach at the time, Dušan Ivković, and thus qualified to the EuroLeague for the 1996–97 season. In the FIBA EuroLeague 1996–97 season, the team was coached by Efthimis Kioumourtzoglou. Two years later, in 1999, Panionios once again reached the semifinals of the FIBA Korać Cup, where they were again eliminated, this time from the super favorites of the tournament, FC Barcelona, which featured Sasha Djordjević.

In the Greek League 2007–08 season, under the ownership of Elias Lianos, the founder of Proton Bank, Panionios, led by Ivan Zoroski, Giannis Kalampokis, and charismatic head coach Nenad Marković, finished in 3rd place in the Greek League. They came back from an 0–2 series deficit in the deciding best-of-five league third-place series against Maroussi, and won the series 3–2. That secured the team a place in the EuroLeague competition for the EuroLeague 2008–09 season. This marked the club's first EuroLeague appearance in more than a decade.

=== Decline of the club ===
After the 2014–15 season, Panionios was relegated to the Greek 2nd Division, after 33 consecutive seasons with a presence in the top-tier level Greek Basket League. For the 2015–16 season, Panionios preferred to play in the third-tier of Greece, the semi-pro level Greek B Basket League, due to financial difficulties. They were promoted up to the Greek 2nd Division for the 2016–17 season.

They won the Greek 2nd Division title of the 2016–17 season, and were promoted back up to the top-tier level league, for the 2017–18 season. Due to financial difficulties, Panionios was demoted down to the Greek 3rd Division, prior to the 2020–21 season.

== Arenas ==
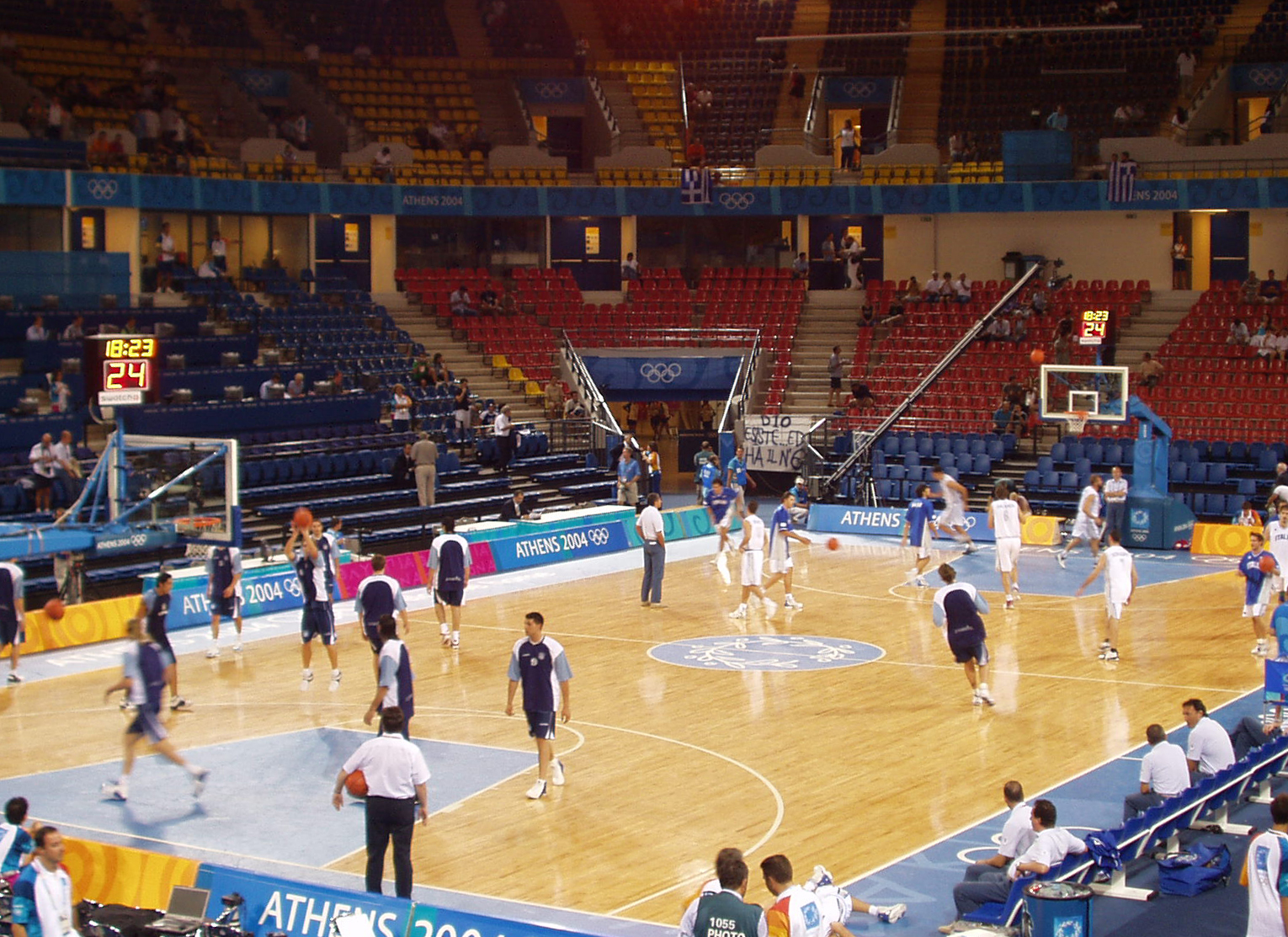
Helliniko Olympic Arena

Panionios played its domestic Greek League home games at "Artakis" Nea Smyrni Indoor Hall, a now demolished 1,832-seat arena that was owned by the Nea Smyrni municipality. They used the arena from its opening in 1979 to 2006, and from 2009 to its close in 2019. From 2006 to 2009, the club used the Helliniko Olympic Arena, which was built for the 2004 Summer Olympics, and has a capacity of 15,000, as its home arena. At various times, the club has also used the National Athletic Center Glyfada Makis Liougas, which has a capacity of 3,232.

In 2019, the club moved into the Sofia Befon Palaio Faliro Indoor Hall for the 2019–20 season. The arena seats 1,204 people. It was opened in 2017.

The municipality of Nea Smyrni has begun the construction of a new modern-style multi-use indoor arena, called the Boban Janković Indoor Hall, named after Boban Janković, which is being built on the same location as the old Nea Smyrni Indoor Hall. The new arena was scheduled to open for the 2022–23 season but after many delays the stadium is still unfinished. The club will play at a smaller arena in Nea Smyrni neighborhood, Andreas Varikas Indoor Hall, until its new arena is completed. Now, until the construction of the new stadium is completed, Panionios has its home ground at National Athletic Center Glyfada Makis Liougas

== Retired numbers ==
Panionios B.C. retired numbers
N°	Nat.	Player	Position	Tenure
4	(Greece)	Fanis Christodoulou	SF/PF	1983–1997
8	(Serbia)	Boban Janković	SF	1992–1993

== Roster ==
=== Current roster ===
Note: Flags indicate national team eligibility at FIBA-sanctioned events. Players may hold other non-FIBA nationalities not displayed.

Panionios roster
Players
Coaches

Pos.	No.	Nat.	Name	Ht.	Wt.	Age
G	2	(United States)	Buchanan, Shaq	1.91 m (6 ft 3 in)		29 – 30 January 1997
G	3	(Greece)	Lignos, Dimitris	1.92 m (6 ft 4 in)		16 – 5 May 2010
PG	6	(Greece)	Koloveros, Iosif	1.86 m (6 ft 1 in)	84 kg (185 lb)	24 – 28 August 2002
C	7	(Greece)	Karras, Thodoris	2.09 m (6 ft 10 in)	100 kg (220 lb)	28 – 18 December 1997
SF	9	(Greece)	Pilavios, Alfredos	1.98 m (6 ft 6 in)	92 kg (203 lb)	26 – 15 December 1999
PF	10	(Greece)	Geromichalos, Petros	2.03 m (6 ft 8 in)	109 kg (240 lb)	32 – 9 June 1994
G	11	(Greece) (United States)	Christofilis, John	1.94 m (6 ft 4 in)	92 kg (203 lb)	24 – 2 September 2002
PF	13	(Greece)	Kamarianos, Nikos	2.04 m (6 ft 8 in)	93 kg (205 lb)	29 – 21 March 1997
G	16	(Greece)	Dendrinos, Konstantinos	1.85 m (6 ft 1 in)		22 – 4 March 2004
G	13	(Greece)	Barlos, Andreas	1.98 m (6 ft 6 in)		16 – 19 February 2010
SG	23	(Greece)	Stavrakoukas, Vassilis	1.91 m (6 ft 3 in)		25 – 23 July 2001
G	25	(Greece)	Sasloglou, Angelos	1.96 m (6 ft 5 in)		16 – 25 April 2010
PF/C	33	(United States)	Walters, Mason	2.06 m (6 ft 9 in)		25 – 7 August 2001
G	75	(Greece)	Petsas, Vasilis	1.96 m (6 ft 5 in)		16 – 26 March 2010

Head coach

- (Greece) Nikos Karagiannis

Assistant coach(es)

- (Greece) Tolis Gravalos

Sports Director

- (Greece) Chris Chougkaz

General Manager

- (Greece) Dimitris Verginis

Team Captain

Legend

- (C) Team captain
- Injured

- Roster
Updated: 1 July 2026

=== Depth chart ===
Note: Flags indicate national team eligibility at FIBA-sanctioned events. Players may hold other non-FIBA nationalities not displayed.

Pos.	Starting 5	Bench 1	Bench 2
C	Thomas Kottas	Thodoris Karras
PF	Petros Geromichalos	Nikos Kamarianos	Sotiris Billis
SF	Quenton DeCosey	Alfredos Pilavios
SG	Shaq Buchanan	Vassilis Stavrakoukas	John Christofilis
PG	Iosif Koloveros	Giorgos Christopoulos	Konstantios Dendrinos

== Honours and titles ==
=== Domestic competitions ===
- Greek League

Runners-up (1): 1986–87

- Greek Cup

Winners (1): 1990–91
Runners-up (2): 1976–77, 1994–95

- Greek 2nd Division (1961–1986) / Greek 2nd Division (1986–present)

Winners (3): 1973–74, 1980–81, 2016–17
Runners-up (1): 2023–24

- Greek 3rd Division

Winners (1): 2015–16

- Greek UNICEF Basketball Cup

Winners (2): 2022–23, 2023–24

=== European competitions ===
- FIBA Korać Cup

Semifinalist (2): 1993–94, 1998–99

=== Other competitions ===
- Athens, Greece Tournament

Winners (1): 2011

== International record ==
Season	Achievement	Notes
Saporta Cup
2001–02	Quarter-finals	eliminated by Anwil Włocławek, 83–74 (W) in Athens and 59–75 (L) in Włocławek
Korać Cup
1989–90	Quarter-finals	eliminated by CSKA Moscow, 107–85 (W) in Athens and 53–106 (L) in Moscow
1992–93	Quarter-finals	eliminated by Philips Milano, 78–79 (L) in Athens and 74–81 (L) in Milan
1993–94	Semi-finals	eliminated by PAOK Bravo, 83–85 (L) in Athens and 64–82 (L) in Thessaloniki
1994–95	Quarter-finals	eliminated by Stefanel Milano, 59–73 (L) in Milan and 82–73 (L) in Athens
1998–99	Semi-finals	eliminated by FC Barcelona, 71–80 (L) in Athens and 61–91 (L) in Barcelona
EuroChallenge
2006–07	Quarter-finals	eliminated 2-1 by Akasvayu Girona, 68–76 (L) in Girona, 82–73 (W) in Athens and 49–83 (L) in Girona

== Season-by-season results ==
Season	Tier	League	Pos.	W–L	Greek Cup	European competitions		
2005–06	1	Basket League	8th		Round of 16			
2006–07	1	Basket League	4th		Round of 16	3 FIBA EuroCup	QF	8–7
2007–08	1	Basket League	3rd		Quarterfinals	2 ULEB Cup	L32	6–6
2008–09	1	Basket League	6th		Semifinals	1 Euroleague	RS	3–7
2009–10	1	Basket League	8th		Quarterfinals			
2010–11	1	Basket League	9th		Round of 16			
2011–12	1	Basket League	3rd		Round of 16			
2012–13	1	Basket League	3rd		Quarterfinalist	2 Eurocup	RS	2–4
2013–14	1	Basket League	4th		Semifinalist	2 Eurocup	L32	6–10
2014–15	1	Basket League	14th		Quarterfinalist			
2015–16	3	B Basket League	1st					
2016–17	2	A2 Basket League	1st	26–4				
2017–18	1	Basket League	12th	7–19				
2018–19	1	Basket League	10th	8–18				
2019–20	1	Basket League	12th	6–14				
2020–21	3	B Basket League	12th		Preliminary round			
2021–22	3	B Basket League	8th					
2022–23	3	B Basket League	1st		Quarterfinalist			
2023–24	2	Elite League	2nd	22–8	Quarterfinalist			
2024–25	1	Basket League	7th	11–16				

== Notable players ==
Note: Flags indicate national team eligibility at FIBA-sanctioned events. Players may hold other non-FIBA nationalities not displayed.

Criteria

To appear in this section a player must have either:

- Set a club record or won an individual award while at the club
- Played at least one official international match for their national team at any time
- Played at least one official NBA match at any time.

Greece:

- (Greece) Dimitris Agravanis
- (Greece) Vangelis Angelou
- (Greece) Ioannis Athanasoulas
- (Greece) Ioannis Athinaiou
- (Greece) Nikos Barlos
- (Greece) Marios Batis
- (Greece) Georgios Bogris
- (Greece) Nikos Chatzis
- (Greece) Christos Christodoulou
- (Greece) Fanis Christodoulou
- (Greece) Makis Dendrinos
- (Greece) Georgios Diamantopoulos
- (Greece) Dimos Dikoudis
- (Greece) Makis Dreliozis
- (Greece) Dimitris Fosses
- (Greece) Georgios Gasparis
- (Greece) Ioannis Georgallis
- (Greece) Panagiotis Giannakis
- (Greece) Charis Giannopoulos
- (Greece) Alexi Giannoulias
- (Greece) Giannis Giannoulis
- (Greece) Savvas Iliadis
- (Greece) - (Serbia) Vlado Janković
- (Greece) Panagiotis Kafkis
- (Greece) Georgios Kalaitzis
- (Greece) Giannis Kalampokis
- (Greece) Andreas Kanonidis
- (Greece) Georgios Karagkoutis
- (Greece) Vassilis Kavvadas
- (Greece) Vassilis Kikilias
- (Greece) Takis Koroneos
- (Greece) Angelos Koronios
- (Greece) Alexis Kyritsis
- (Greece) Georgios Limniatis
- (Greece) Nikos Linardos
- (Greece) Antonis Mantzaris
- (Greece) Dimitris Marmarinos
- (Greece) Faidon Matthaiou
- (Greece) Dimitris Mavroeidis
- (Greece) Kostas Missas
- (Greece) Nikos Oikonomou
- (Greece) - (Canada) George Papadakos
- (Greece) Theo Papaloukas
- (Greece) Dimitris Papanikolaou
- (Greece) - (Cyprus) Nikos Pappas
- (Greece) Michalis Pelekanos
- (Greece) Stratos Perperoglou
- (Greece) Nondas Papantoniou
- (Greece) Vangelis Sakellariou
- (Greece) - (Serbia) Dušan Šakota
- (Greece) Christos Saloustros
- (Greece) Zisis Sarikopoulos
- (Greece) Georgios Sigalas
- (Greece) Alexandros Sigkounas
- (Greece) Ioannis Sioutis
- (Greece) Vangelis Sklavos
- (Greece) Gaios Skordilis
- (Greece) Dimitris Stamatis
- (Greece) Tzanis Stavrakopoulos
- (Greece) Vassilis Symtsak
- (Greece) Christos Tapoutos
- (Greece) Dimitris Verginis
- (Greece) Vassilis Xanthopoulos

Europe:

- (Germany) Stephen Arigbabu
- (Turkey) Ender Arslan
- (Serbia) Dejan Borovnjak
- (Serbia) Branko Cvetković
- (France) Boris Dallo
- (Serbia) Uroš Duvnjak
- (Serbia) Zoran Erceg
- (Bulgaria) Vassil Evtimov
- (Serbia) Boban Janković
- (Serbia) - (Greece) Dušan Jelić
- (Lithuania) Gintaras Kadžiulis
- (Lithuania) Antanas Kavaliauskas
- (Serbia) Dragan Lukovski
- (Bosnia and Herzegovina) Nenad Marković
- (France) Guy-Marc Michel
- (Serbia) Vladimir Micov
- (Montenegro) Goran Nikolić
- (Serbia) Žarko Paspalj
- (Serbia) - (Greece) Miroslav Pecarski
- (Serbia) - (Greece) Miroslav Raičević
- (Montenegro) - (United States) Tyrese Rice
- (Portugal) Joao Santos
- (France) Laurent Sciarra
- (Georgia (country)) Nikoloz Tskitishvili
- (Latvia) Kristaps Valters
- (Slovenia) Jure Zdovc

USA:

- (United States) William Avery
- (United States) Thurl Bailey
- (United States) Toby Bailey
- (United States) Lonny Baxter
- (United States) Davion Berry
- (United States) Chris Booker
- (United States) P.J. Brown
- (United States) Rion Brown
- (United States) Travon Bryant
- (United States) Devin Cannady
- (United States) T. J. Carter
- (United States) Mateen Cleaves
- (United States) Devin Davis
- (United States) Jon Diebler
- (United States) Byron Dinkins
- (United States) Joey Dorsey
- (United States) Ruben Douglas
- (United States) Muhammad El-Amin
- (United States) Luke Hancock
- (United States) Antonio Harvey
- (United States) Donnell Harvey
- (United States) John Hudson
- (United States) Andre Hutson
- (United States) Chris Jent
- (United States) Billy Keys
- (United States) Randolph Keys
- (United States) Mark Landsberger
- (United States) Kevin Langford
- (United States) Travis Mays
- (United States) Amal McCaskill
- (United States) Errick McCollum
- (United States) Jeff McInnis
- (United States) Gerry McNamara
- (United States) Landon Milbourne
- (United States) Aaron Miles
- (United States) Chris Owens
- (United States) Mark Payne
- (United States) Gabe Pruitt
- (United States) Kendrick Ray
- (United States) Rod Sellers
- (United States) Paul Shirley
- (United States) E. J. Singler
- (United States) Kendall Smith
- (United States) Ed Stokes
- (United States) Jimmie Taylor
- (United States) Henry Turner
- (United States) John Wallace
- (United States) Travis Watson
- (United States) Mitchell Wiggins
- (United States) Kennedy Winston
- (United States) Ryan Woolridge
- (United States) Rashad Wright

Rest of Americas:

- (Canada) - (Republic of Ireland) Levon Kendall
- (Jamaica) Samardo Samuels

Africa:

- (Nigeria) - (United States) Chinemelu Elonu
- (Cameroon) Landry Nnoko

Oceania:

- (Australia) Brad Newley

== Head coaches ==
Head Coach	Years
(Greece) Michalis Kyritsis	1982–1983, 1987–1988
(Greece) Makis Dendrinos	1983–1987, 1997–1998
(Greece) (Serbia) Vlade Đurović	1988–1993
(Greece) Kostas Missas	1993–1994, 2002
(Serbia) Dušan Ivković	1994–1996
(Greece) Efthimis Kioumourtzoglou	1996–1997
(Greece) (Slovenia) Lefteris Subotić	2000–2001
(Greece) Panagiotis Giannakis	2001–2002
(Greece) Georgios Kalafatakis	2002–2004, 2017
(Greece) Memos Ioannou	2004–2006
(Greece) Nikos Linardos	2006
(Montenegro) Luka Pavićević	2006–2007
(Greece) Minas Gekos	2007
(Bosnia and Herzegovina) Nenad Marković	2007–2008, 2009–2010
(Serbia) Alex Trifunović	2008–2009
(Greece) Georgios Bartzokas	2010–2012
(Greece) Thanasis Skourtopoulos	2012
(Greece) Ioannis Sfairopoulos	2012–2014
(Greece) Vangelis Alexandris	2014–2015
(Greece) Chris Chougaz	2015, 2018
(Greece) Vangelis Ziagkos	2015–2016, 2017–2018
(Greece) Nikos Oikonomou	2016–2017, 2018–2019
(Greece) Vassilis Fragkias	2018–2019
(Greece) Ioannis Livanos	2019
(Greece) Linos Gavriel	2019–2020

== Top players in games played and points scored in the Greek Basket League (since the 1992–93 season) ==
Panionios team leaders in games played and points scored, since the Greek Basket League became fully professional, starting with the 1992–93 season.

- Through the 2019–20 season.

Rank	Player	Games Played
1.	(Greece) Marios Batis	174

Rank	Player	Points Scored
1.	(Greece) Georgios Diamantopoulos	2,676

== See also ==
- Panionios F.C.
- Panionios G.S.S.
