= Angelopoulos =

Angelopoulos (Greek: Αγγελόπουλος) is a Greek surname meaning "son of Angelos". The feminine form is Angelopoulou (Αγγελοπούλου). Notable people with the surname include:

- Athanasios Angelopoulos (born 1939), Greek professor
- Gianna Angelopoulos-Daskalaki (born 1955), Greek businesswoman
- Giorgos Angelopoulos (born 1974), Greek businessman
- Jaime Angelopoulos (born 1982), Canadian sculptor
- Lycourgos Angelopoulos (1941–2014), director of the Greek Byzantine Choir
- Manolis Angelopoulos (1939–1989), Greek singer
- Panagiotis Angelopoulos (born 1973), Greek businessman
- Theo Angelopoulos (1935–2012), Greek film director
- Theodore Angelopoulos (born 1943), Greek businessman
- Vassilis Angelopoulos (born 1965), THEMIS principal investigator at the University of California's Berkeley Space Sciences Laboratory, in Berkeley, Calif.
