= Chesterford Park Research Station =

Research centre in Essex, England

- Chesterford Research Park
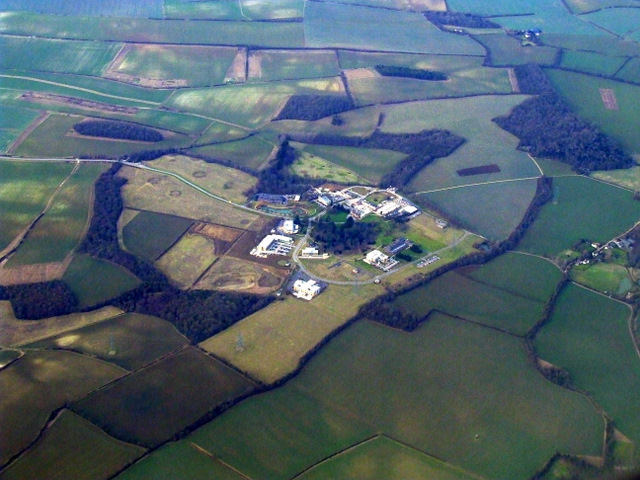
- The current site from above in February 2012

- Location within Essex
- Alternative names: Chesterford Park, Chesterford Research Park

General information
- Type: Research centre
- Architectural style: Country house
- Location: Little Chesterford, Essex, CB10 1XL
- Coordinates: 52.057°N 0.2356°E
- Elevation: 80 m (262 ft)
- Current tenants: Science park
- Completed: 1956
- Inaugurated: 2 October 1956
- Client: Fisons

Chesterford Park Research Station was a crop protection research centre in Little Chesterford, Essex. It is now a science park with biotechnology companies.

== History ==
The 808 acres of the Chesterford Park Estate was put up for sale in June 1950, owned by Werner Göthe since around 1930.

Pest Control Ltd of Bourn in south-west Cambridgeshire, bought the Little Chesterford Park site in 1952. The Bourn site made crop spraying equipment. Fisons bought Pest Control Ltd in early 1954.

Elwyn Parry-Jones was the site's first technical director, who died in July 1965.

In September 1964, the site started research work with Boots.

Genetic resistance by insects to insecticides was increasing in the late 1960s. By the late 1960s, the site had around 220 staff.

From the 1970s, the director of the site was Charles Edwards.

By the late 1980s, there were around 500 staff.

The site is accessed via the B184 from junction 9 of the M11 motorway.

=== Ownership ===
Boots and Fisons joined divisions in 1980 to form FBC Limited. In 1982 Fisons sold its fertiliser division to a Norwegian company for £50m. On Monday 18 July 1983, Boots and Fisons sold FBC Ltd to Schering AG of West Germany for £120m with the sale completed on Wednesday 14 September 1983.

In late 1993, Schering's chemical division looked at merging with another German chemical company Hoechst, which formed AgrEvo on 3 March 1994.

In July 1999, AgrEvo UK looked at closing the site due to Hoechst merging, to become Aventis. The site briefly became part of Aventis CropScience UK. On 12 October 2001, Aventis CropScience was bought for 7.25 billion euros.

In 2000, Aviva Investors acquired the park, planning to develop it further alongside its joint-venture partners, adding new buildings and infrastructure to accommodate tenants as their operations expand.

In 2017, Uttlesford District Council purchased a 50% share in the park, making them joint owners alongside Aviva Investors.

=== Construction ===
New buildings were opened on Tuesday 2 October 1956 by Sir William Slater. The new buildings included a Medical Laboratory for tests on laboratory animals. The buildings were built by Prime Ltd of Cambridge. The site was around 240 acres - there was 90 acres of woodland and a 139-acre farm.

In 1967, a new animal health unit opened, with a £30,000 pig unit, and £30,000 building for a dairy herd.

In the late 1970s, a £4.5m building was built. The new centre was opened on Tuesday 24 April 1979 by Scottish biochemist Alexander R. Todd, who won the 1957 Nobel Prize in Chemistry.

A 400kv transmission line runs north–south through the east of the site, on the 4ZM Walpole, Norfolk - Burwell, Cambridgeshire - Stocking Pelham route.

== Research ==
From 1954, it conducted research on TCA, which it sold under the tradename Tecane

Insecticides had radioactive tracers to test uptake by insects.

In 1942, the herbicide DNOC - dinitro-ortho-cresol was found, but it was harmful to humans. In 1956, the site found a way to reduce the harmful effects. MCPA was found in 1945, but DNOC was better, as MCPA had resistance.

In February 1958, a team under Dr Pfeiffer discovered TCB. The site researched pesticides, known as crop protection, by Fisons Pest Control. The pesticide Rogor (dimethoate) was developed there, as well as Banlene and Carbyne. Fison's other site was Levington Research Station, in Suffolk, which was for fertiliser products.

In April 1977, the site won a Queen's Award for Industry, for the Norton herbicide, made at a new £3.5m factory in Widnes, with 350 workers, which opened in October 1976; it was awarded on Friday 8 September 1977.

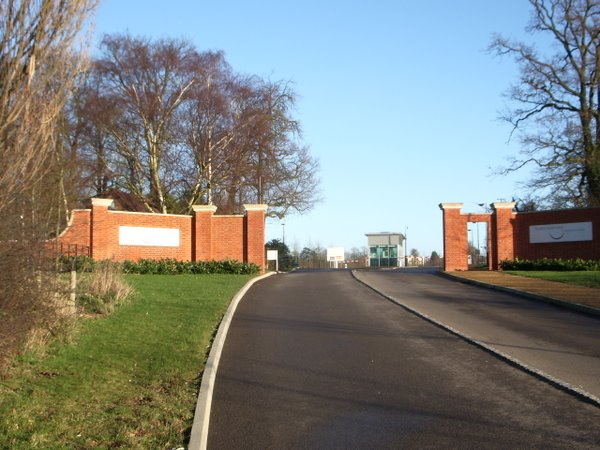
Entrance to the site in December 2006

=== Animal research ===
Environmental toxicity was tested on rodents such as mice, rats, and hamsters, and on rabbits, ducks and chickens, by radioactive tracers. Various types of insects were kept. In the late 1950s, it conducted research around £250,000 a year.

=== Recent ===
Restroscreen Virology opened a clinical trials laboratory on the site in 2014.

== Visits ==
The Duke of Kent visited the site on the morning of Tuesday 23 January 2013

Prince Philip, Duke of Edinburgh visited the Fisons Pest Control site on the afternoon of Friday 18 October 1963, initially travelling by aircraft, and later personally piloting a red-coloured helicopter; he had visited Shell in Kent in the morning, and the day before he had visited the ICI plant protection research centre in Berkshire. The Duke met James Turner, 1st Baron Netherthorpe, the chairman of Fisons, and Sir John Carmichael, the deputy chairman.

== Occupants ==
The research park is occupied by AstraZeneca and Illumina, Inc., among others.

== See also ==
- Alderley Park
- British Industrial Biological Research Association
