= Halyvourgiki Hellenic Steel Industry =

Defunct steel producer in Greece

Halyvourgiki–Hellenic Steel Industry S.A. Χαλυβουργική–Ελληνική Βιομηχανία Χαλκού Α.Ε.
- Company type: Anonymi Etairia
- Industry: Metals, manufacturing
- Predecessor: Angelopoulos family
- Founded: 1925
- Defunct: 2020
- Headquarters: Athens, Greece
- Key people: Giorgos Varoufakis (Executive Chairman); Giorgos Skindilias (CEO)
- Products: Construction; Copper; Aluminium; Steel
- Number of employees: 170 (2018)
- Website: www.halyvourgiki.com

Halyvourgiki Hellenic Steel Industry S.A. (Greek: Χαλυβουργική–Ελληνική Βιομηχανία Χαλκού Α.Ε.) was one of the main steel producers in Greece, and the second largest after Viohalko.

== History ==
Halyvourgiki Hellenic Steel Industry S.A. was established in 1925 as a trading company. It moved into wire production in 1932, and steel production in 1938.

Production was modernized and expanded after World War II, with the company moving production into a new factory in Elefsina in 1953. The following years were its "golden age", as a construction boom connected with the Greek economic miracle lead to a huge increase in demand for steel. During the 1960s and 1970s, the firm was the only vertically-integrated steelmaker in Greece.

Halyvourgiki faced serious economic problems during the economic crisis of the late 1980s and early 1990s in Greece, but managed to survive following a modernization program, which involved adding new products and technologies to the company.

=== Downfall ===
In 2012, the company experienced a dramatic downfall in production, with sales falling 70.62%. In 2012, the firm owed financial institutions over €1 billion. In February 2014, following a drastic drop in the demand for steel in Greece, and high energy costs, the company halted steel production, and suspended 200 of its remaining 263 workers. Prior to that, 148 workers voluntarily retired.

In 2015, the company permanently ceased production, but continued to operate for the sake of its employees. In a 2018 interview with the head of the worker's union president, he stated that he had not seen the company's owner, Konstantinos Angelopoulos, in two years. By 2018, the union stated that the firm employed 170 workers, who worked three days a week, down from an estimated 600 to 700 workers in 2006. As of 2018, Halyvourgiki was more than €400 million in debt to private banks and the Greek public sector, and was unable to service its debt since 2016.
