= 56 Old Church Street =

Building in London, England

Coordinates: 51.4853°N 0.1724°W

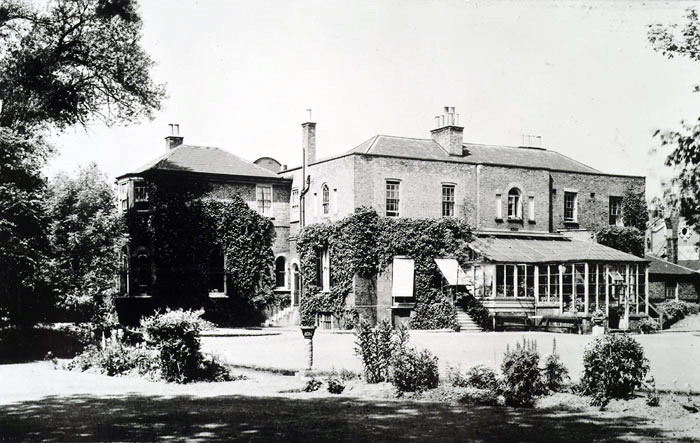
56 Old Church Street, c.1900.

The Old Rectory is a grade II listed house in Old Church Street, Chelsea, London. It is one of the city's most valuable private residences, valued at up to £250 million, and owned by Norwegian billlionaire John Fredriksen since 2001.

== House and gardens ==
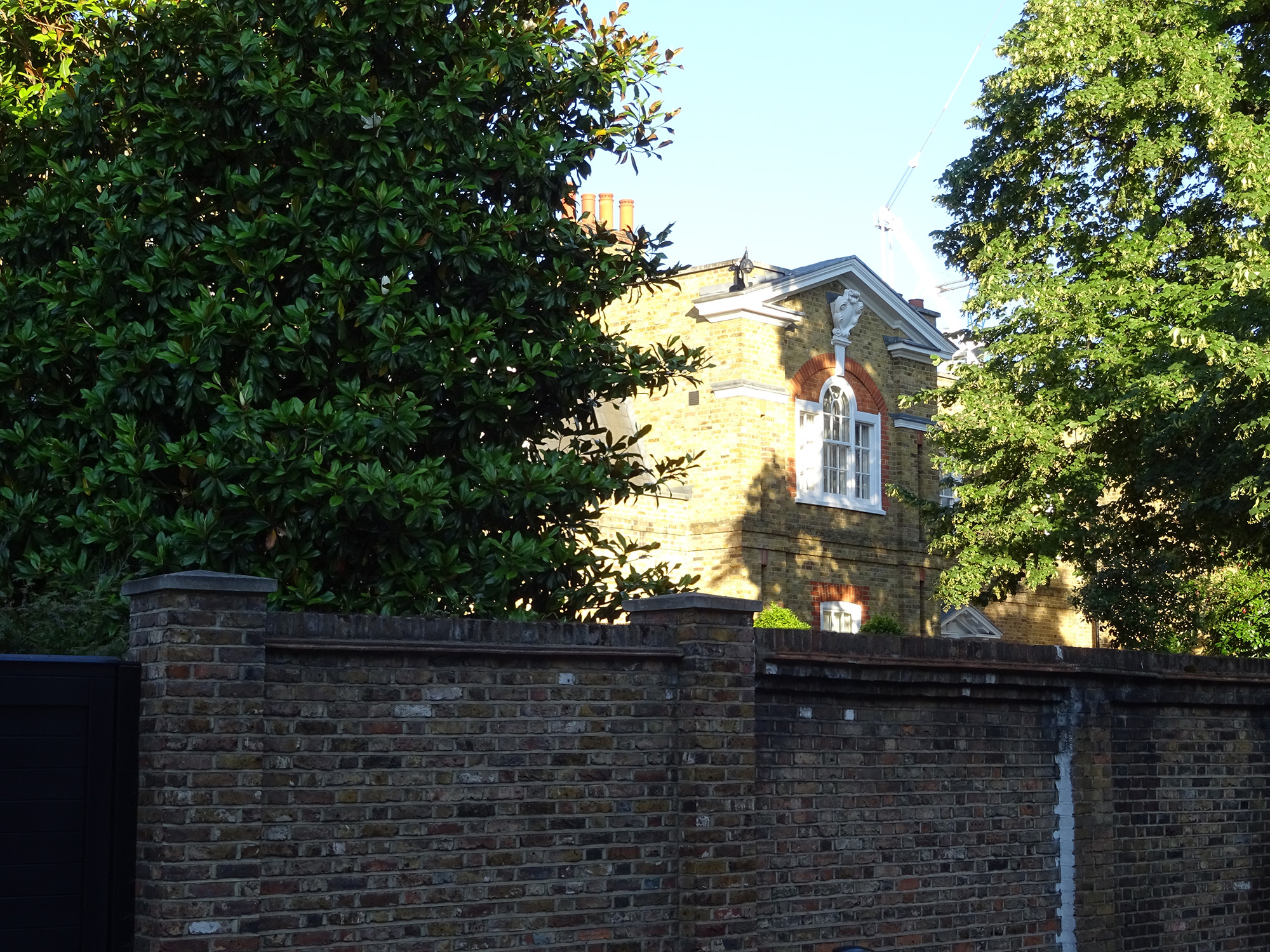
The Old Rectory (2016)

The current house mostly dates to about 1725, the early Georgian period, but the site itself was given by the Marquis of Winchester in 1566. The Old Rectory has two acres of gardens, the largest private garden in London behind Buckingham Palace, Winfield House and Witanhurst.

== Nineteenth century ==
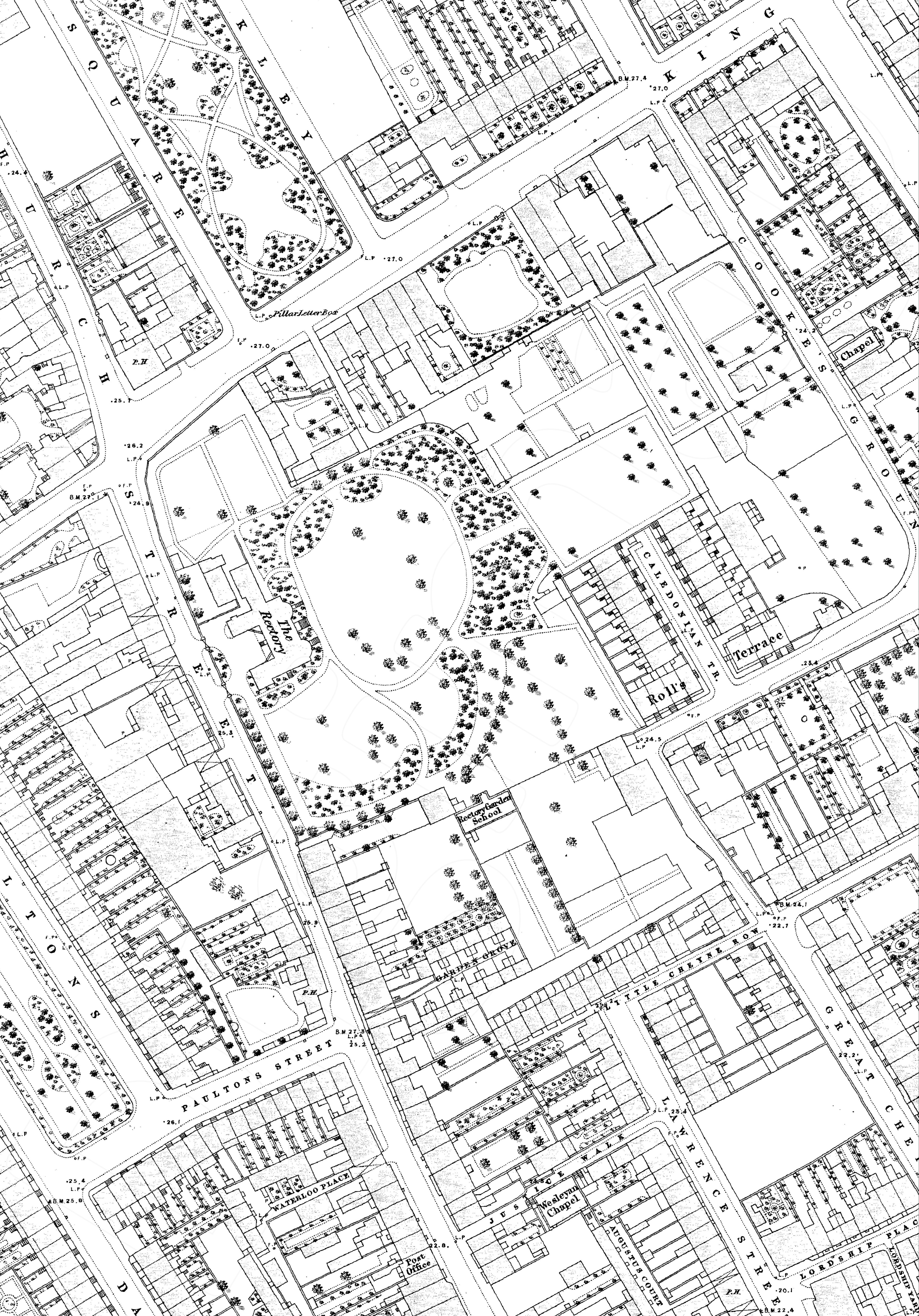
56 Old Church Street (centre) on an 1868 Ordnance Survey map.

It was formerly home to the rector of Chelsea parish church, which was Chelsea Old Church, which dates from 1157, until the larger St Luke's Church, Chelsea was consecrated in 1824, when the rector from 1805 to 1832 was George Valerian Wellesley, brother of the Duke of Wellington.

From 1824 to 1830, Henry Blunt was George Wellesley's curate, then became the first rector of Trinity Church in Sloane Street, but turned down the post of rector of St Luke's offered to him by Lord Cadogan.

Other notable rectors have included Charles Kingsley Sr (rector from 1836 to 1860), father of Charles Kingsley author of The Water Babies, and Henry Blunt's son Gerald Blunt, father of Chelsea historian Reginald Blunt.

== Twentieth century and later ==
From 1990 to 1994, it was refurbished under the supervision of the South African developers Collett and Champion (Anthony Collett and David Champion), with funding provided by the Japanese businessman, Norikazu Nemoto, with all three being directors of Toyoko Metropolitan Company (TMC). Two "huge wings" were added, with ten bedroom suites and a "massive ballroom". It was being marketed at around £25 million, and they were also developing the next-door 58 Old Church Street. In February 1995, it sold for £22 million to Greek shipping magnate Theodore Angelopoulos, and was for many years London's largest and most expensive property sale in the UK.

In 2001, Norwegian shipping magnate John Fredriksen bought the property for £37 million. In 2004, it was reported in The Evening Standard that Roman Abramovich had offered £100 million for the 30,000 square feet house even though it was not for sale. In 2012, The Washington Post reported the property was "worth US$172 million". In 2015, The Tatler included the Old Rectory in their list of "The best private ballrooms". Country Life reported the house discreetly listed in 2020. As of 2025, the property is thought to be worth up to £250 million.

== List of rectors ==
The rectory has had the following rectors since it has been at its present location:

- 1566, Robert Richardson
- 1569/70–1574, John Churchman
- 1574–1585, Thomas Browne STB
- 1585–1615, Richard Ward
- 1615–1632, George Hambden STP
- 1632–1669, Samuel Wilkinson STP
- 1669/70–1694, Adam Littleton DD
- 1694–1732, John King DD. King found the Rectory in very poor repair and lived in another house in Church Street until 1703.
- 1732–1766, Sloane Elsmere
- 1766–1770, Reginald Heber, father of Reginald Heber (1783-1826), Bishop of Calcutta
- 1770–1775, Thomas Drake LLD
- 1775–1797, William Bromley Cadogan, second son of Charles Cadogan, 1st Earl Cadogan
- 1797–1805, Charles Sturgess
- 1805–1832, Hon. G. V. Wellesley
- 1832–1836, John William Lockwood MA
- 1836–1860, Charles Kingsley MA
