= Birkin Haward =

British Modernist architect, antiquarian, author and artist

Birkin Haward

Birkin Haward OBE (7 or 16 October 1912 – 9 February 2002) was a British Modernist architect, antiquarian, author and artist, described as "one of the foremost post-war regional architects" by Historic England. In his early architectural career, he worked at the practice of Erich Mendelsohn and Serge Chermayeff in London, where he collaborated on two important Modernist buildings, 64 Old Church Street, Chelsea, and the De La Warr Pavilion, Bexhill-on-Sea.

After the Second World War, Haward's work focused in the east of England, from a base in his home town of Ipswich (1946–82). He became particularly known for his Modernist designs for schools, several of which have been recognised as listed buildings: primary schools at Rushmere (1947–49) and on Sprites Lane (1956), as well as the library at Ipswich School (1980–82). His other listed buildings are the Castle Hill Congregational Church (1955–56) and his home, The Spinney (1960), both in Ipswich. During the post-war period he also designed housing projects, hospital buildings, sports halls, and commercial and industrial buildings.

After his retirement in 1982, Haward published books on Victorian ecclesiastical stained glass and medieval church architecture. He was an amateur artist, and some of his works have been exhibited after his death.

== Early life and education ==
Haward was born in Ipswich, Suffolk, in 1912. He was named "Birkin" for his maternal family. He attended Bracondale School in Norwich, where he studied art and draughtsmanship. After leaving school, he worked at the Ipswich architectural practice of Cautley and Barefoot (1929–32), where he was mentored by H. Munro Cautley, an expert in ecclesiastical architecture who served as surveyor for the St Edmundsbury and Ipswich diocese.

He left Cautley and Barefoot to attend the Bartlett School of Architecture at the University of London (1932–34), where he was taught by A. E. Richardson. There he was disappointed to find that then-contemporary giants in the architectural field such as Le Corbusier and Frank Lloyd Wright failed to feature in the curriculum, which as he later noted, did not continue far into the 19th century. In 1933 he toured the Netherlands by bicycle, which stimulated his interest in modern styles practised on the Continent, particularly the work of Le Corbusier, Willem Dudok and Erich Mendelsohn.

== Early career and war service ==
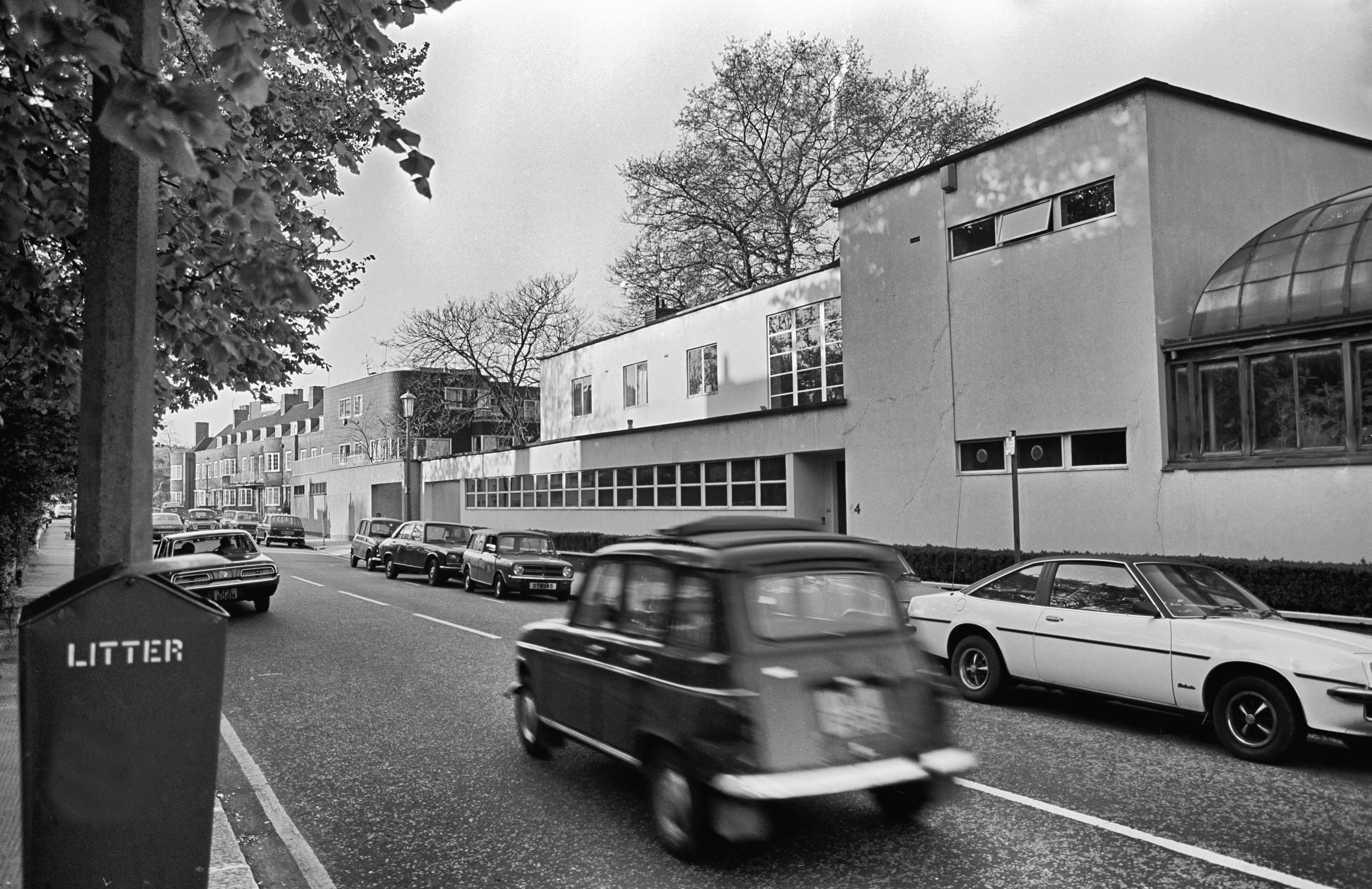
64 Old Church Street, Chelsea

In 1934, Haward joined Mendelsohn's partnership with Serge Chermayeff and their assistant Hannes Schreiner, remaining there until the practice's closure. At the London practice he was involved in the design of 64 Old Church Street, Chelsea (1936), considered a Modernist classic, and also worked on the De La Warr Pavilion at Bexhill-on-Sea. In 1935, he spent six months near Jerusalem with Schreiner, establishing the firm's Palestine office and working on multiple commissions there. During his time at the practice Haward also entered many competitions, never winning but placing second in two, including a well-publicised 1937 News Chronicle competition to design a school in Richmond, North Yorkshire.

After Mendelsohn and Chermayeff's partnership was wound up, Haward remained in London and continued to work for Chermayeff until 1938. His politics were to the left, and he joined the Communist party. Like other left-leaning Modernist architects of his generation, he advocated for housing improvements and the construction of air-raid shelters, and he worked on the latter with Berthold Lubetkin and his company Tecton. In 1941–42, he designed accommodation for ordnance factory workers in Staffordshire, in a group directed by William Holford. He created a mural in one hostel. In 1942–43, he managed the Association of Architects, Surveyors and Technical Assistants trades union. In April 1943, (Note: The Times obituary states 1941.) he joined the Royal Engineers' 82 Assault Regiment and served in France and Germany, with the rank of lieutenant.

== Post-war career ==
Haward was demobilised at the start of 1946. By this time, he had a growing family in Ipswich and, instead of returning to work in London, decided to join Martin Slater's firm in the town, Johns and Slater. He was made a partner in 1949; the firm became Johns, Slater and Haward in 1953.

At the Ipswich practice he mainly designed schools in Ipswich and the east of England. His works in the 1940s include two Ipswich primary schools – "two of his most fully achieved works", according to his Times obituarist – at Rushmere and at Whitton, which were extolled by the architects working at the Ministry of Education. The school at Rushmere dates from 1947–49 and was his earliest school design; it received an award at the 1951 Festival of Britain, and was listed at grade II in 2013. It is on a zig-zag-shaped plan with an "austere prefabricated" design. The success of these early schools led to commissions from C. H. Aslin, the county architect for Hertfordshire and later president of the Royal Institute of British Architects.

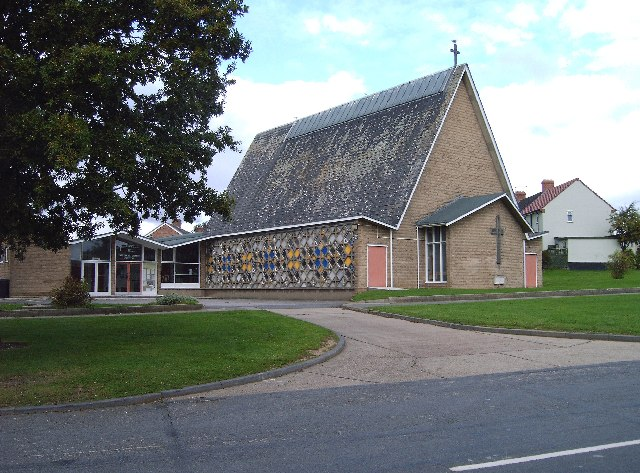
Castle Hill church

With the primary school at Sprites Lane on the Ipswich Chantry Estate, designed in 1956, Haward began to try out novel designs. This school has a complex timber roof including multiple hyperbolic paraboloid shapes, designed by Hugh Tottenham; it is considered to be the second (after the Royal Wilton Carpet Factory, now demolished) and oldest extant example of a hyperbolic paraboloid timber roof in Britain. The exterior and entrance walls are decorated with relief panels, some of which were designed by Haward and his colleagues, and others by the local artist Bernard Reynolds. Haward's later schools include Gusford primary school in Ipswich and Redcar primary school in North Yorkshire, which the Times obituary describes as "extremely neatly planned"; and Halifax school in Ipswich (1968–70), an early example of an open-plan school layout under a wooden dome, described by architectural historian Andrew Saint as a "rare example of the open-plan school carried through with complete success". In all, the practice designed 44 primary schools and 9 secondary schools between 1948 and 1974.

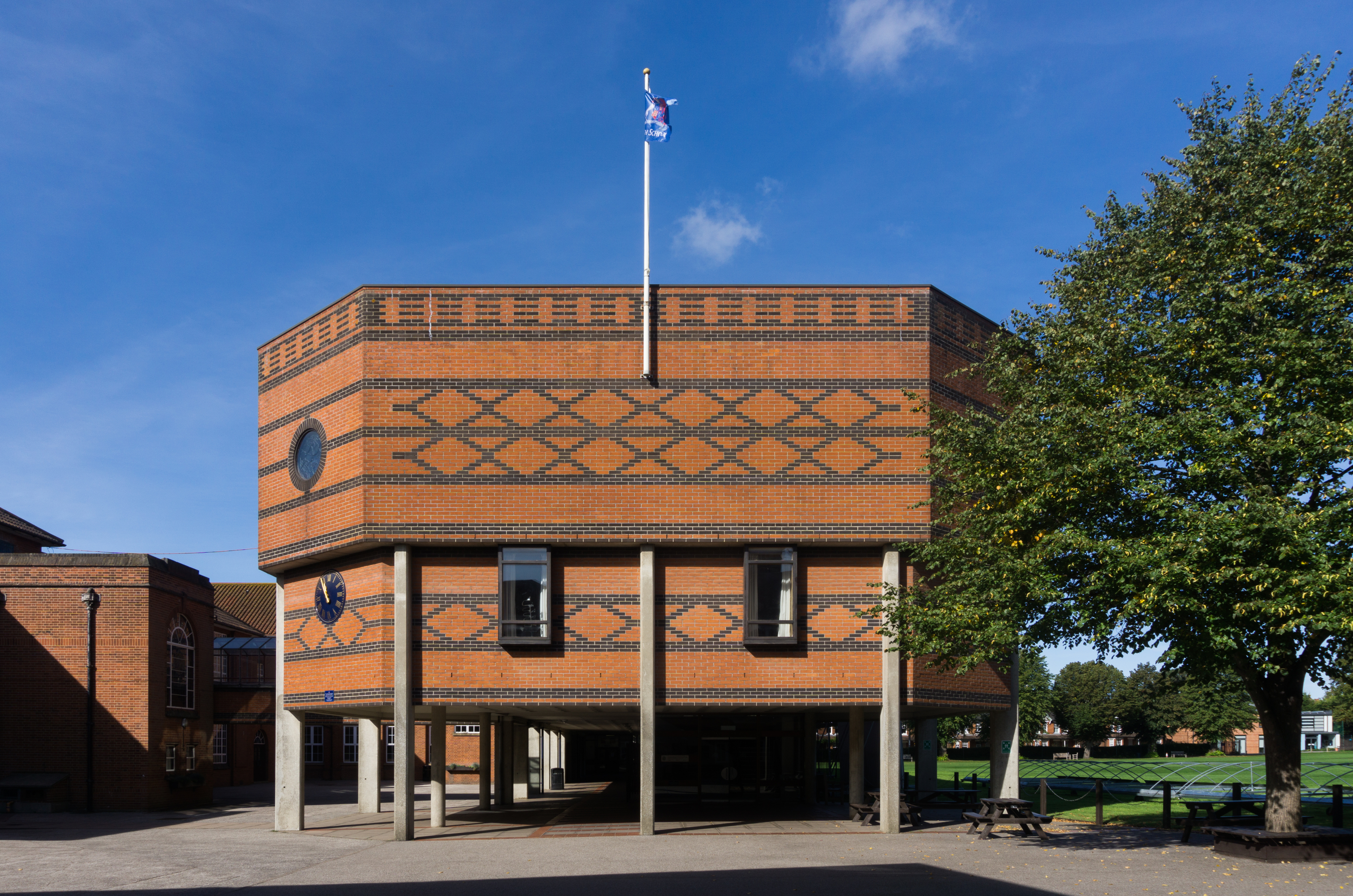
The library at Ipswich School

Haward designed the grade-II-listed Castle Hill Congregational Church in Ipswich (1955–56), which is characterised by its extremely steep roof with an unusual profile; its walls are decorated with coloured panels in a lozenge pattern. He rarely designed private houses; the most notable example is The Spinney, also grade II listed, a "quirky" timber house built in Ipswich for himself and his family in 1960. The house centres around a two-storey hall with a first-floor gallery. The architectural writer Alan Powers regards it as among his best work. Haward's other output includes housing projects, projects for the Cambridge Hospital Board, commercial buildings, office blocks, and industrial buildings, such as the Fisons facility at Levington, Suffolk (1957). His work often employs geometrical patterns and structures fashionable during the 1950s. He was known for designing timber-framed domed roofs for sports halls.

His final substantial work was the library block at Ipswich School (1980–82), now listed at grade II. The octagonal library building is raised on concrete supports with a jettied upper storey and is decorated with diamonds and bands in blue brick. It has circular windows and stained glass by John Piper.

Haward retired from architectural practice in 1982. Historic England describes him as "one of the foremost post-war regional architects", as well as "one of the foremost post-war school architects".

== Artist, antiquarian and author ==
During his service in the Royal Engineers, Haward documented the effects of the war on France and Germany in a series of "remarkable" pencil drawings that cover the D-Day landings, his squadron's advance through Germany, and VE Day. The drawings were donated to the Royal Engineers Museum in 2001, and a selection are now displayed online. He painted local scenes in the North Norfolk area over sixty years from the 1930s, particularly subjects including the church in the village of Salthouse, where he had a holiday house. He employed various media and styles. His paintings were exhibited at Clare Hall, University of Cambridge, in 2008.

In retirement, Haward researched and published on Victorian ecclesiastical stained glass, Nineteenth Century Norfolk Stained Glass (1984) and Nineteenth Century Suffolk Stained Glass (1989). He then turned to medieval church architecture, photographing and meticulously recording every medieval church arcade in Suffolk, published as Suffolk Medieval Church Arcades 1150–1550 (1993). His final research, on medieval roof carvings in the county (1999), was only published in part. He sought to elucidate the identity of the medieval craftsmen by closely examining their work. He also co-authored the Dictionary of Architects of Suffolk Buildings 1800–1914 with Cynthia Brown and Bob Kindred (1991).

== Personal life ==
In 1936, Haward married Muriel Wright, an artist from Ipswich (died 1956); they had three sons and a daughter. Two of their children became architects, including his eldest son, Birkin Jr (born 1939), of van Heyningen and Haward. He lived at The Spinney, 108 Westerfield Road, Ipswich, until his death. From the 1930s, he also had a long association with North Norfolk, and in 1946 purchased a pair of fishermen's cottages at Salthouse, where the family spent holidays until the mid-1970s.

His Times obituary describes Haward as "retiring" as well as "exceedingly gifted". Saint describes him as "modest to a fault" and considers him to have "lacked personal ambition or faith in his designing". Historic England, however, describes him as "ambitious" and well connected, and attributes his decision to practice in Ipswich wholly to his family. He was awarded the OBE in 1969.

He died on 9 February 2002 in Ipswich.

== References and notes ==
- Charles McKean. Architectural Guide to Cambridge and East Anglia Since 1920 (Era Publications Board/RIBA Publications; 1982) ISBN 0-907598-013
