= MZ Wallace =

American luxury brand

- Company type: Private
- Industry: Fashion
- Founders: Monica Zwirner and Lucy Wallace Eustice
- Headquarters: New York City, United States
- Products: Handbags and fashion accessories
- Website: mzwallace.com

MZ Wallace is an American luxury fashion brand founded in Soho, New York City in 2000 by Monica Zwirner and Lucy Wallace Eustice. According to Entrepreneur, "the brand today is synonymous with functional luxury." As reported by People, "MZ Wallace is well-known for its sleek backpacks, crossbodies, and wallets."

== History ==
Founders Monica Zwirner and Lucy Wallace Eustice met at a Manolo Blahnik store in 1985, and again at a farmer's market in New York in 1999. They bonded over a shared background in the fashion industry. "They had both been circling a similar idea – a chic, durable, all-purpose bag" which combined the functionality of nylon with the fashion sensibilities of Italian leather.

Zwirner had experience in fashion with Gucci, BMW, and Lancôme and in interior design with Selldorf Architects before co-founding MZ Wallace. Wallace Eustice worked with Harper’s Bazaar, Elle Magazine, and Manolo Blahnik prior to co-founding MZ Wallace.

They founded a storefront in 2000 in Manhattan and distribute to various retailers. There is also a MZ Wallace store in Chicago. They work with retailers such as Bloomingdale's, Saks Fifth Avenue, Nordstrom, and Neiman Marcus.

MZ Wallace launched online in 2004, and is known for not offering discounts through online sales to maintain the value of its products. As of April 2023, MZ Wallace is a certified B Corporation, meaning it is a business that meets the high verified standards of social and environmental performance, accountability, and transparency.
