= Old Church Street =

Street in London, England

Coordinates: 51°29′16″N 0°10′28″W

Old Church Street is a street in London, England in the Royal Borough of Kensington and Chelsea.

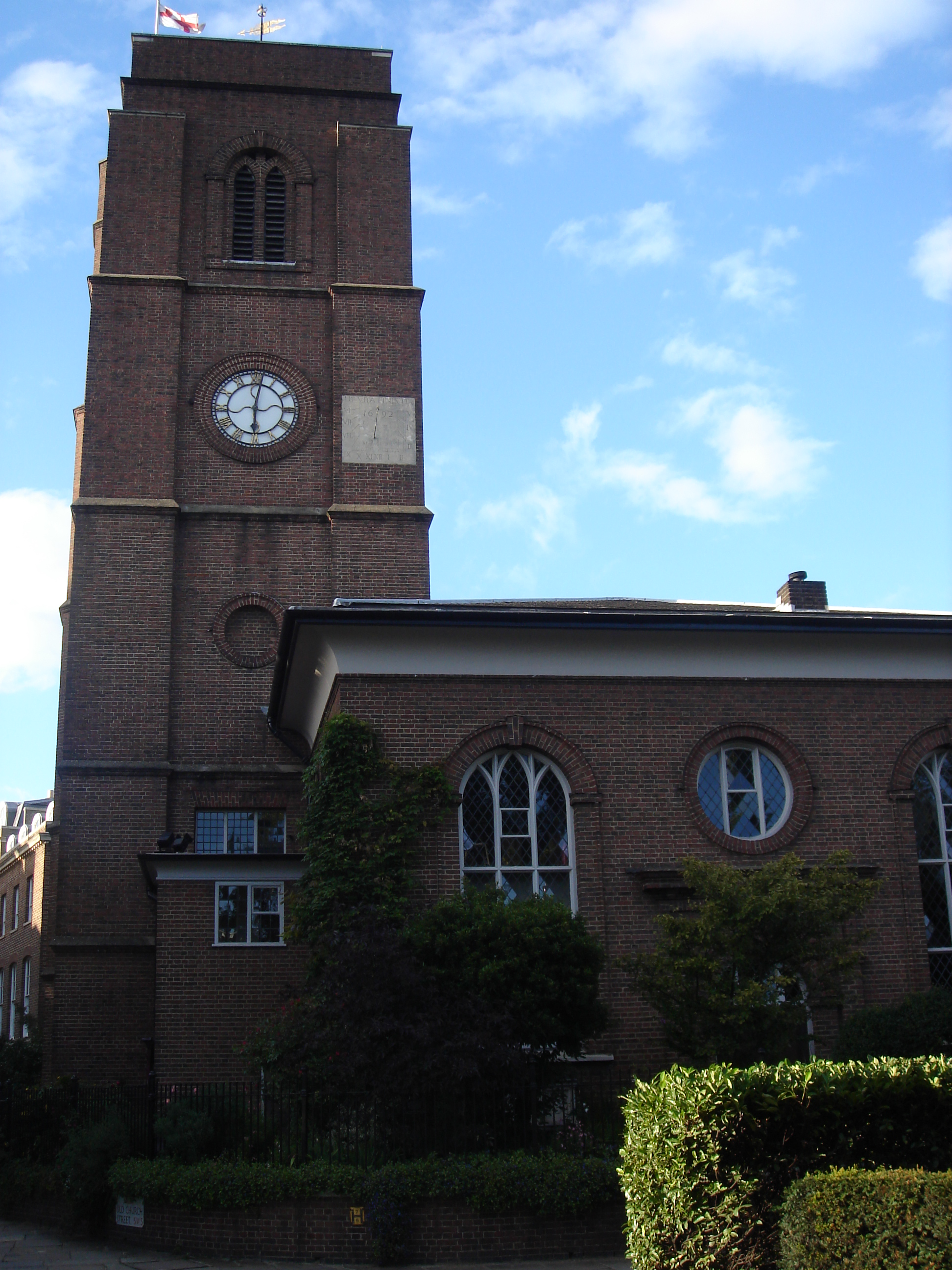
Chelsea Old Church

It runs from Chelsea Embankment to Fulham Road, crossing Kings Road. The section to the north of Kings Road is sometimes called Upper Old Church Street. At the Chelsea Embankment end is Chelsea Old Church (All Saints) which gives its name to the whole street, the oldest in Chelsea. It was mentioned in 1566, but was called Church Lane at that time.

The recording studios, Sound Techniques, was at 46a Old Church Street from 1964 to 1972. It was here that Nick Drake recorded his first album "Five Leaves Left". Pink Floyd, Sandy Denny, Fairport Convention, Steeleye Span, Pentangle, John Martyn, Beverley Martyn, Richard Thompson, Martin Carthy, Judy Collins, John Cale, The Yardbirds and The Who also recorded here.

== Notable residents ==
Steve Clark, guitarist for Def Leppard, lived and died at 44 Old Church Street. Charles Kingsley lived at Number 56, the Old Rectory, which is said to have the largest private garden in London aside from Buckingham Palace.

Nearby at 28 Mallord Street is a house designed in 1913–14 for Augustus John. At 13 Mallord Street, A. A. Milne lived.

The politician and playwright Benn Levy lived at Number 66, which was designed in 1936 by Walter Gropius and Maxwell Fry; Levy's house formed part of a joint development with Number 64, the home of publisher Denis Cohen, which was designed by Erich Mendelsohn and Serge Chermayeff.

At number 127 is a plaque marking the residence of William and Evelyn De Morgan. The building was especially adapted for them so that they could create and paint ceramics. The sporting painter John Francis Sartorius (circa 1775–1830) has a plaque marking his house at number 155.

Sloane House at No. 149 is a detached 18th-century house. It has been owned by several prominent personalities including Anthony Bamford, Ely Calil, John Ehrman, Geoffrey Fry and Guy Granet. In 2010 it was bought by Petra Ecclestone who connected it to the adjoining Sloane Lodge to create a residence of 25,000 sq ft.

The shoe designer Manolo Blahnik (born 1942) sold his shoes to "Zapata", his own boutique is at number 49-51 Old Church Street. The Chelsea Arts Club is at number 143.

The actress Judy Campbell and her husband Lt-Cdr David Birkin bought the oldest house in the street, which was once a pub, "a few steps from the Chelsea Arts Club", in 1974, and Campbell lived there until her death in 2004.

In 1792 there was a field called "Queen’s Elm Field" at the northern end of the street. Several houses were built there in 1794. On the corner of Old Church Street and Fulham Road is a building called "The Queen’s Elm". It was once a pub but is now a fashion shop. Directly opposite is a Jewish burial ground. It was in use from 1815 to 1884 by the Western Synagogue, now called the Western Marble Arch Synagogue. The southern side of Fulham Road at this point is called Queen's Elm Parade.

From 2002 until 2011 the Princess of Wales (as Miss Catherine Middleton) lived in a flat on Old Church Street.

== Artisans ==
Charles Shapley (Chapley) "... coal merchant and lighterman..." (c. 1710–1780) Charles Shapley was bound apprentice lighterman to Thomas Rowles on 13. Jan 1726, at Christ Church (Blackfriars, Southwark). He gained his freedom as "Freeman of the River Thames" after 7 years on 14. Feb 1733. . In his will made 19 August 1779 (Public Record Office ref. - PROB 11/1069 - ) Charles Shapley (Chapley) "... coal merchant and lighterman ...", , gave his residence as his "freehold house" in Church Lane, Chelsea. He bequeathed two freehold houses in Church Lane and another two freehold houses around the corner in Lombard Street which was formerly that part of Cheyne Walk lying between No. 67 and the entrance to Danvers Street.

Charles Shapley made provision for his interment in Chelsea Old Church north side where he had caused a stone to be raised ("All Saints" 1788 showing Arch House . Lombard Street was through the arch). In the year 2000, the Museum of London Archaeological Services carried out an archaeological dig at the cemetery . One of the few graves identified was that of "Charles Shapley (70 years)". His coffin was fitted with a large decorated lead plate bearing the inscription "Mr Charles Shapley Died 16 Sept 1780 Aged 70". The plate is archived by the Museum of London Archaeological Services.
