= David Walker (cricketer) =

English cricketer

Personal information
- Full name: David Frank Walker
- Born: 31 May 1913; Loddon, Norfolk, England
- Died: 7 February 1942 (aged 28) near Trondheim, German-occupied Norway
- Batting: Right-handed
- Bowling: Slow left arm orthodox

Domestic team information
- Years: Team
- 1933–35: Oxford University

Career statistics
Competition	First-class
Matches	37
Runs scored	1,880
Batting average	29.37
100s/50s	2/18
Top score	118
Balls bowled	299
Wickets	6
Bowling average	49.83
5 wickets in innings	0
10 wickets in match	–
Best bowling	2/36
Catches/stumpings	18/–
- Source: Cricinfo, 1 September 2009

David Frank Walker (31 May 1913 – 7 February 1942) was an English cricketer. He was a right-hand batsman and slow left-arm bowler who played first-class cricket for Oxford University and minor counties cricket for Norfolk.

Born in Loddon, Norfolk, Walker began his cricket career with Uppingham XI topping the batting averages in his three seasons (1930-1932) with them.

At this time Walker also played for Norfolk, in his second match scoring 73 not out against Kent Second XI in the Minor Counties Championship, the innings was the highest for Norfolk that season. He scored his maiden century for Norfolk two seasons later against the same opposition. Walker continued to play for Norfolk until the Second World War, in nine seasons scoring 4034 runs at an average of 62, seven times he topped the County averages and three times heading the Minor Counties Competition's. His highest score came in 1939 when he made an innings of 217 against Northumberland, he shared in a Minor Counties record first-wicket partnership of 323 with Harold Theobald.

While attending Brasenose College, Oxford, Walker played 34 first-class matches for the University team between 1933 and 1935, scoring 1799 runs at 30.49 with two centuries. The first came against Gloucestershire in only his second appearance, the second against Worcestershire in 1934. He was appointed captain of the team in 1935, his highest score of that season came against the touring South Africans, he scored 83 having shared in a 198 run stand with Mandy Mitchell-Innes.

After he left Oxford, Walker taught at Harrow School, where he was master in charge of cricket.

== Military career and death ==
In September 1939 he undertook an educational role in Sudan, then joined the RAF in South Africa. On 7 February 1942, Flight Lieutenant Watson, part of No. 608 Squadron, took off as the pilot of a Lockheed Hudson with 4 aboard. The plane was assigned to take off from RAF Wick and conduct an anti-shipping operation along the Norwegian coast. The plane was either shot down or crashed into fjords, and 1 crew member died. Walker was mortally wounded, and died of wounds a day after the crash. The other two crew members went missing, and their fates are unknown, though it is presumed they died in the crash. Aged 28 at the time of his death, Walker had married three months earlier.

A biography was published in 2025, David Walker: Norfolk's Master Batsman by Andy Dawson.
