= Sloane House, Chelsea =

House in London, England

Sloane House
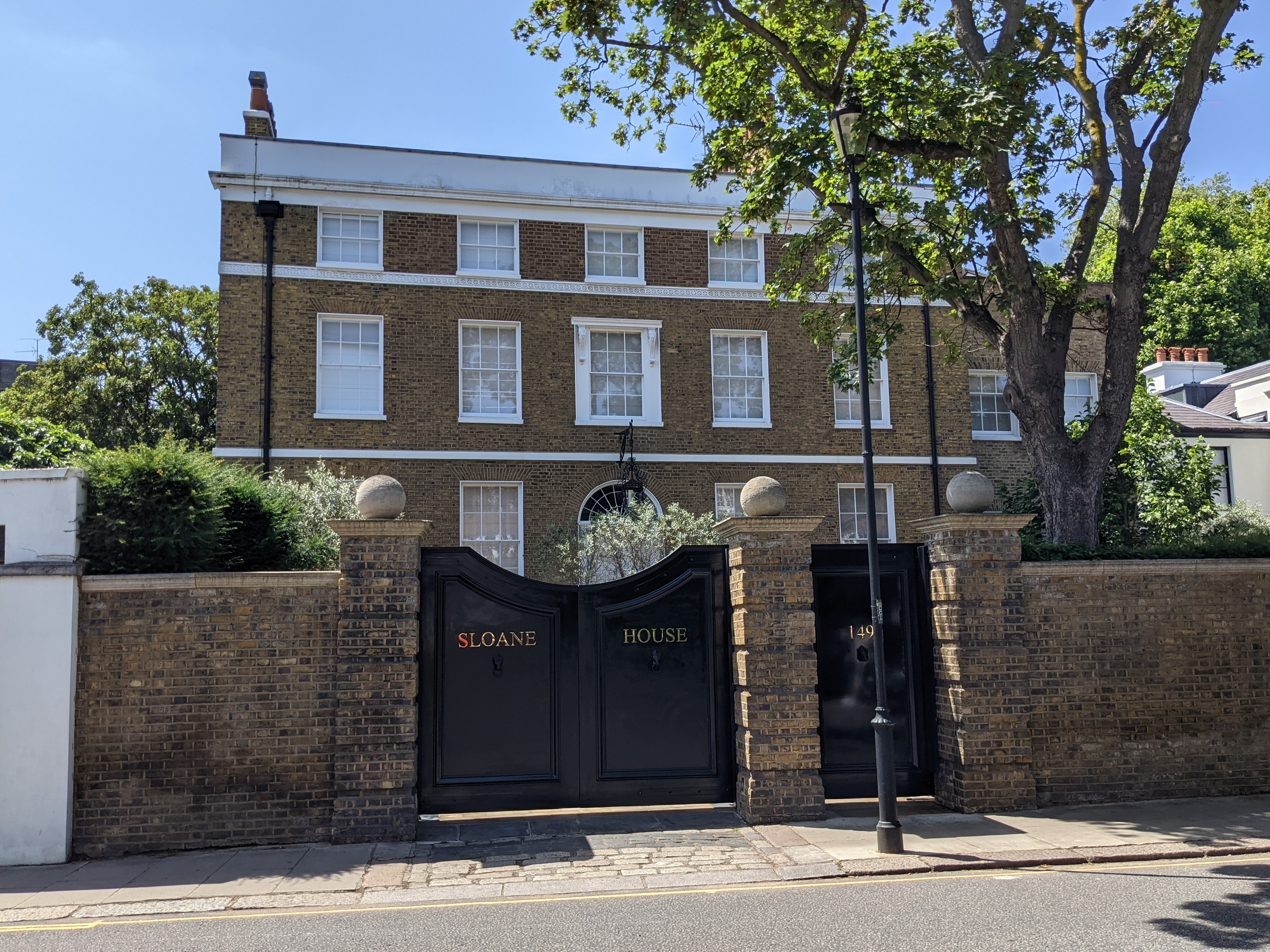
- The house in 2016

- Location within Greater London

General information
- Location: Old Church Street, Chelsea, London, England
- Coordinates: 51°29′17″N 0°10′30″W
- Year built: Late 18th century

Listed Building – Grade II
- Official name: Sloane House
- Designated: 24 June 1954
- Reference no.: 1266196

Sloane House is a late 18th-century house on Old Church Street in Chelsea, London.

The 1991 London: North West volume of the Pevsner Architectural Guides described Sloane House as a "good C18 house of five bays with broad arched doorway of two columns and a decorated upper string course". It has been listed at Grade II on the National Heritage List for England since June 1954.

== History ==
From 1845 to 1881 the house was a residence for "ladies suffering from the milder forms of mental disease". It was the residence of Guy Granet and his wife from February 1924. In the late 1920s it was bought by Geoffrey Fry. A Mrs Hillgarth was resident in 1945. The historian John Ehrman was resident in the 1960s. Oil trader Ely Calil was resident for many years at Sloane House and sold it to Anthony Bamford in 2004 for £45 million. Bamford bought Sloane House with the adjoining Sloane Lodge and intended to join the two houses together to create a house of 24,000 square feet (2,200 m^{2}). It was put up for sale in 2009 for £79 million. Bamford's plans were opposed by the Chelsea Society who found "every aspect of the application objectionable". In 2010 it was bought by heiress Petra Ecclestone and her husband James Stunt for almost £60 million. The couple spent two years renovating the house with Casa Forma to create a residence of 25,000 square feet (2,300 m^{2}). Following Ecclestone's renovations the house had 14 bedrooms and a substantial basement. The basement of the house has a gym, a spa, a salon, an indoor swimming pool, squash courts, a children's playroom and a screening room. The large hallway has a mirrored bar that "converts into a DJ station". In 2019 Ecclestone offered the house for sale for £150 million and "at least" £175 million in 2021. Gangster Terry Adams of the Clerkenwell crime syndicate lived at Sloane House in 2017 when it was the residence of James Stunt, the estranged partner of Ecclestone. Stunt was given two days to leave Sloane House at a court hearing in 2017 following his estrangement from Ecclestone. The house was the subject of a feature in Architectural Digest in 2021.
