= Little Chesterford =

Village in Essex, England

Coordinates: 52°03′12″N 0°12′32″E

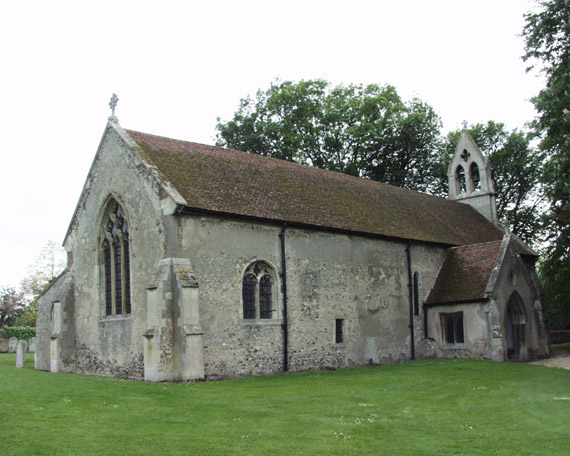
- Little Chesterford church

- Location within Essex
- Population: 207 (Parish, 2021)
- OS grid reference: TL515415
- Civil parish: Little Chesterford
- District: Uttlesford
- Shire county: Essex
- Region: East
- Country: England
- Sovereign state: United Kingdom
- Post town: Saffron Walden
- Postcode district: CB10
- Dialling code: 01799
- Police: Essex
- Fire: Essex
- Ambulance: East of England
- UK Parliament: North West Essex

Little Chesterford is a village and civil parish in the Uttlesford district of Essex, in the East of England. Close to the Cambridgeshire border, it is built principally along a single sunken lane to the east of a chalk stream tributary of the River Cam or Granta and is located 3/4 mile (1.2 km) southeast of Great Chesterford and some 2 1/2 miles (4.0 km) northwest of Saffron Walden. The small hamlet of Springwell is just to the south of the village. At the 2021 census the parish had a population of 207.

Up the hill to the east is Chesterford Park, with a mid-19th-century mansion in a 250 acres (100 ha) estate and now a science park called Chesterford Research Park. The wide and relatively deep valley of the river Cam provides a rolling landscape of chalky boulder clay with extensive and wide views. The surrounding farmland is mostly in intensive arable use, and except for areas alongside the river, some of which are liable to flooding, it is classified as being of grade 2 quality.

The grouping of the church, manor house and village hall form the heart of the village. The church of St Mary dates from the early 13th century and retains much of its original form, having a long aisleless nave and chancel under a single roof. The main furnishings of interest are the simple 15th-century screen, the recently restored monument of James Walsingham (1728) – an early work by Henry Cheere – and the monumental brass to George and Isabel Langham (1462). The church was restored during the 19th century, including the addition of a vestry and the building of a bell-cot for two bells at the west end.

The manor also dates from the 13th century and is one of the earliest inhabited houses in Essex. It was built in three separate phases – a mid to late-13th century timber-framed aisled hall, flanked by a slightly later solar wing, and an earlier (early-13th century) and extremely rare stone survival in Essex that was converted into a services wing. It now has the form of a classic H-shaped manorial house and retains much of the original stone and woodwork.

Amongst other buildings of interest, the former school was built in 1862 for 24 children but was closed by 1902. The building (a typical example of a Victorian school) was used as the Sunday school and now serves as the village hall. Opposite is a 16th-century hall house, later floored, the cross-passage blocked by a fireplace but with the frame of the original front door exposed. There are more timber-framed and plastered houses up the village towards the Saffron Walden road. A small brick bridge over the Cam, built in 1791 to replace an earlier sixteenth-century one, forms the village's western boundary.

== History ==
Little Chesterford has always been a small village. The earliest evidence of habitation are Neolithic remains found west of the village in the area of Bordeaux Farm and to the east, in Chesterford Park, Bronze and Iron Age artefacts have been found. The place name 'Chester' is a common indicator that the place is the site of a Roman fort. Here, the ford and first century AD fort, in question were at Great Chesterford. However, evidence has also been found of at least three Romano-British homesteads in the grounds of Chesterford Park. The manor of Manhall stood in the area of Chesterford Park, and before Domesday and at the conquest the manor was held by Siward and an unnamed Saxon freeman. The manor house became disused and fell into disrepair during the 17th century and is no more. There is documentary evidence to suggest that the site may be the location of a castle built in the 13th century.

The population of Little Chesterford has changed little over the years. The Domesday Book entry (as Cestrefort) records some 27 householders which suggests an overall population of just over 100. The first National Census of 1801 gives a population of 120. This peaked at 276 in the census return of 1861. The population reported in the 2011 census was 215.

Similarly, the physical size of the village has changed relatively little from that described in the enclosure awards published in 1810 – the only real change to the village envelope being the addition of 20 or so houses on the Saffron Walden road in the mid-20th century. From the 16th century until 1840, Chesterford Park was a major farm with an estate in the region of 3,200 acres (13 km^{2}). Its owners have included Sir Thomas Audley, Lord Harvey, Harrold Pickersgilt-Cunliffe, inventor of the umbrella shooting stick and Lord Inchcape, Chairman of the P&O Line. Since the war the site, Chesterford Park Research Station, has been used as a research and development facility for another series of owners – Boots, Fisons, Aventis and Schering. It was developed as a Science Park as a joint venture by Aviva Investors and Churchmanor Estates. In May 2017 it was announced that Uttlesford District Council had bought a 50% share in the park.

Two key events, in 20th-century Little Chesterford, made the national press:

- The Village Fire of 1914; On the morning of 7 April 1914 a spark, probably from a traction engine on the London to Newmarket road to the west of the village, triggered a fire that the westerly wind swept from thatch to thatch through the village. In less than four hours the fire had destroyed two farms, two public houses and nine dwellings, leaving forty-three people homeless – around 20% of the village's population. The mix of the houses in today's village reflects the disaster of 1914. A short film made by Eclair Journal of the aftermath of the fire can be watched on the BFI National Archive website.
- Explosion at Chesterford Park of 1944; With the outset of war in 1939, Chesterford Park was requisitioned. The mansion was used as a hospital and the grounds, an ammunition dump. On the morning of 30 May 1944, the ammunition dump blew up in a series of major explosions that were heard as far away as Ely (over 25 miles (40 km) distant), Dunmow and Buntingford and windows were blown out for miles around. The village and hospital were evacuated, but no one was seriously hurt. Chesterford Park mansion was never again used as a residence.

== Recreation ==
The village community holds a number of typical English rural events during the year. The first on the calendar is the Easter Egg Hunt, always on Easter Saturday afternoon. The Village Fete, usually held on the second Saturday of June, is a mixture of traditional games (splat the rat, lucky golf, target soccer, coconut shy, crockery smash) and the usual stalls (white elephant, cakes and produce, plants, books, toys) accompanied by live music, steam engine rides and tea. The year is completed with Bonfire Night, always held on the traditional date of 5 November – bonfire, fireworks, food and drink. In recent years, special celebrations have been organised for the centenary of the Great Fire (2014), the Queen's Diamond Jubilee (2013), and Queen's 90th birthday (2016). Little Chesterford, in conjunction with its neighbour Great Chesterford, produces the Chesterford Broadsheet, a monthly newsletter which is distributed free of charge to each household. Little Chesterford receives a fortnightly visit by the Saffron Walden mobile library service.

== Governance ==
Little Chesterford is part of the Chesterfords electoral ward. The total population of this ward at the 2011 census was 1,709.

== Transport ==
Little Chesterford is 2 miles (3.2 km) from junction 9 (A11) of the M11 motorway. The village is served by Stagecoach East bus route Citi 7. Great Chesterford railway station is 3/4 mile (1.2 km) away with regular services to Cambridge and London Liverpool Street.

The ancient trackway the Icknield Way passes within 1 mile (1.6 km) of the village.

== See also ==
The Hundred Parishes
