= Bracondale School =

School in Norwich

Coordinates: 52°37′12″N 1°18′13″E

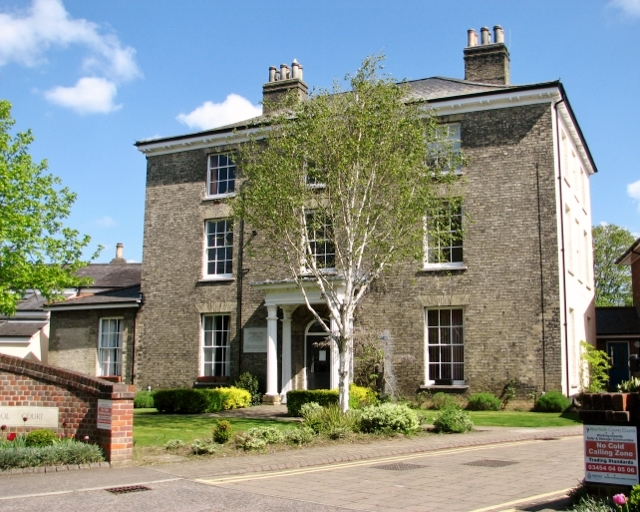
- The former school

Information
- School type: Private Boys' School
- Established: 1821
- Closed: 1993

Bracondale School was a private boys' school in the Bracondale area of Norwich, Norfolk. It existed from 1821 to 1993.

== History ==
The school was opened on Bracondale Hill in July 1821 as an academy for boys between the ages of 8 and 16 years. It was established by Daniel Banfield Hickie who had recently relocated from Dublin, following dismissal of his allegations of fraudulent conduct within the Record Tower there, and who advertised that he conducted a system of instruction enabling completion of his pupils’ education “in little more than half the time usually spent in public schools and on a much more solid basis”.

Hickie was a classicist who contributed extensively to A. J. Valpy’s publications, reputedly being responsible for more than one third of the 143 volumes comprising Valpy’s Delphin Classics. He left Bracondale in 1828 on his appointment as headmaster of Hawkshead Grammar School in succession to Thomas Bowman, who had taught William Wordsworth, and he was made an honorary Doctor of Laws by Glasgow University in the same year.

In 1831 Bracondale was reported to have been purchased by a clergyman-schoolmaster, but by the 1840s the establishment was headed by William Francis Paul whose “kindly and gentle method was combined with high religious principle and unswerving integrity”. Paul educated there “a great many who subsequently rose to distinction” (including Sir Gordon Sprigg, prime minister of Cape Colony), and both during his headmastership and for some years thereafter the school was popularly spoken of as “Paul’s”.

Following Paul’s retirement in 1862, John Paul Cadge (who had previously conducted Bridge House School at Bungay) took control of Bracondale, then described as a “classical and commercial academy”, and he continued as its headmaster until ill health obliged him to share the position with A. W. Shakespeare. Shakespeare took sole charge in the early 1890s and was briefly succeeded by Frederick Pierpoint prior to Dr Francis Darkins Wheeler acquiring the school in 1896.

Wheeler had, since 1882, conducted Paragon House School in St Giles’s Road, Norwich, as a day and boarding school preparing boys for University and Civil Service examinations. He merged Paragon House with Bracondale, moving his existing scholars to Bracondale’s premises and adopting its name.

At one time, under J. P. Cadge, the school had been called Hillhouse School, Bracondale. In the 1930s it was sometimes known as Bracondale School for Boys.

F. D. Wheeler was a Cambridge graduate of varied interests. He wrote textbooks on entomology (he was President of the Norfolk and Norwich Naturalists’ Society in 1892), had been a partner in a timber business, and while running Paragon House obtained the post-graduate degree of Master of Laws from his old university (by which he was advanced to a doctorate in 1891). Wheeler Road on the Mile Cross Estate is named after him.

He continued as headmaster of Bracondale until 1911 when he was succeeded by F. B. Williams who had been his assistant for twenty years. A later headmaster was Frederick E Scott. The headmaster until 1985 was Dr. Donald Cole. The final headmaster was Denzil Gaudoin (1985-1993).

The school's aims and objectives were "To produce happy and decent young gentlemen who do their best, and have consideration for the welfare and feelings of others". Pupils were known as Bracondolians, and Peppermint Boys, from the colour of their caps. The school had its own scout group (33rd Norwich).

== Closure ==
The school ran out of money, and closed suddenly in 1993.

The school building was Grade II listed in 1972. The list entry makes it clear that the school building was originally a house.

The school is now housing, part of a Norwich Housing Society estate built in 1999. The school's war memorial remains in the main school building.

== Old Boys ==
Notable old boys include:

- Donald Cunnell, WWI flying ace
- Bill Edrich, test cricketer
- Eric Edrich, first-class cricketer
- Geoff Edrich, first-class cricketer
- John Edrich, test cricketer
- Ralph Hale Mottram, writer and Lord Mayor of Norwich
- Birkin Haward, architect
- George Skipper, architect
- Harold Theobald, cricketer and footballer
- Rob wick, Live Music Director & Cameraman. Roadie Legend

There is a Bracondale School Association; when the school was still operational there was a Bracondale School Old Boys' Union.
