= Sergey Kushchenko =

Russian sports executive

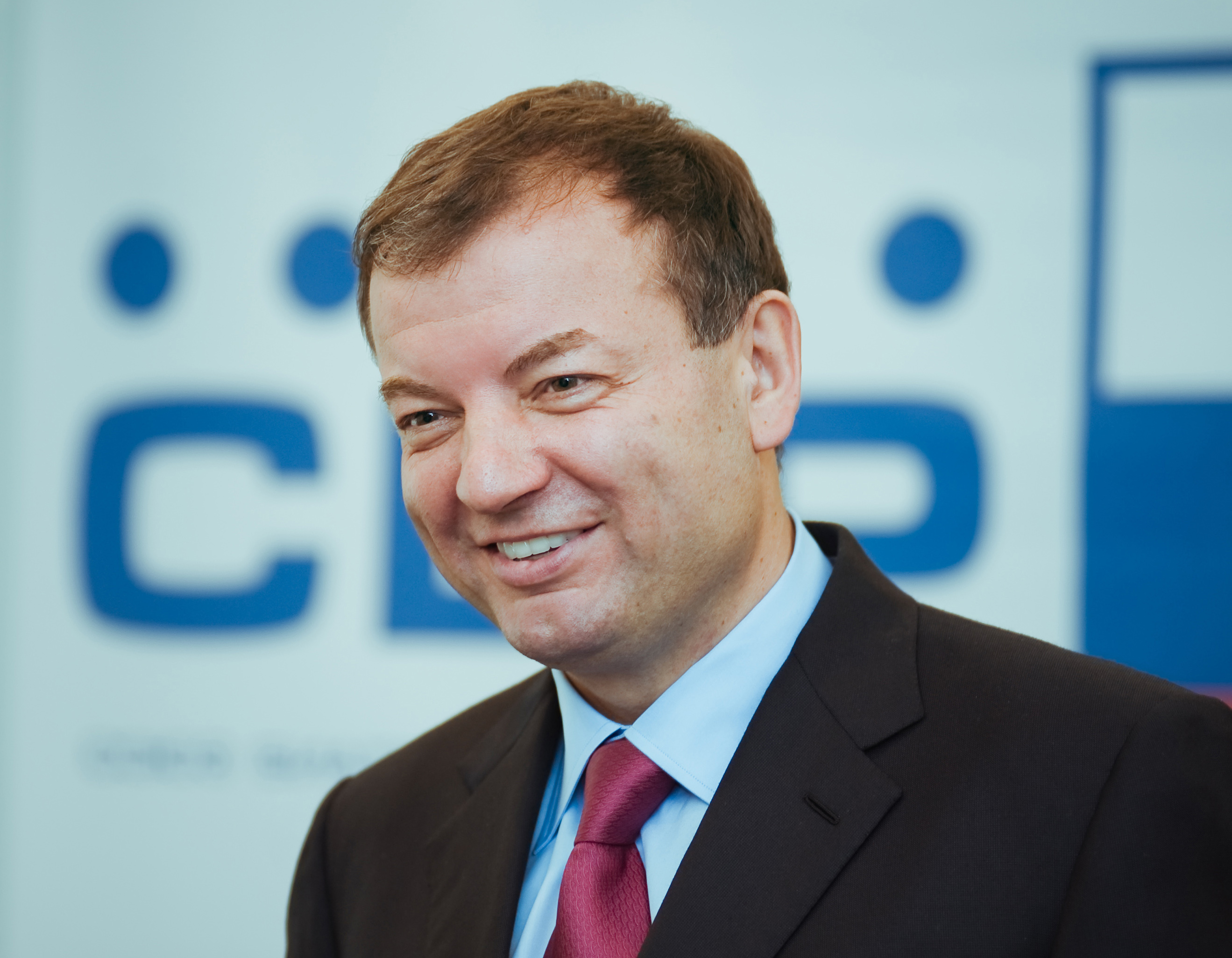
- Born: 27 May 1961 (age 65); Novye Lyady, Perm Krai, Russia
- Occupation: Sports manager

Sergey Valentinovich Kushchenko (Russian: Сергей Валентинович Кущенко; born 27 May 1961) is the Executive Director of the Russian Biathlon Union, the first vice-president of the International Biathlon Union, and the member of the Board of directors for the Brooklyn Nets.

== Biography ==
Sergey Kushchenko was one of the founders of Ural-Great, a professional basketball club in Perm, Russia. In the late nineties under Sergey's leadership, Ural-Great grew to be one of the top Russian clubs. From 1995 to 2002 during Kushchenko's presidency, the team won two Russian championships.

In 2002, CSKA Moscow recruited Kushchenko to lead its organization. Sergey attracted strong coaches players and made several innovations to the club's structure and practices.

In 2005, Euroleague included CSKA in the marketing commission, and Kushchenko became part of the Euroleague Council. Shortly afterwards, CSKA won two Euroleague championships.

In 2006, Sergey was appointed the head for the Central Sports Army Club in Moscow which entailed more than forty different sports including hockey, basketball, tennis, swimming, and biathlon.

In 2009, Kushchenko was invited by Mikhail Prokhorov to become CEO of the Russian Biathlon Union. On 2 September 2010, Kushchenko was elected as the first vice-president of the International Biathlon Union. In May 2011 he was appointed to the New Jersey Nets Board of directors.

== Recognition ==
- 2007 The Order of Honour (Russia)
- 2006 EuroLeague Club Executive of the Year Award
