= 66 Old Church Street, Chelsea =

Building by Walter Gropius and Maxwell Fry

Coordinates: 51.4880°N 0.1743°W

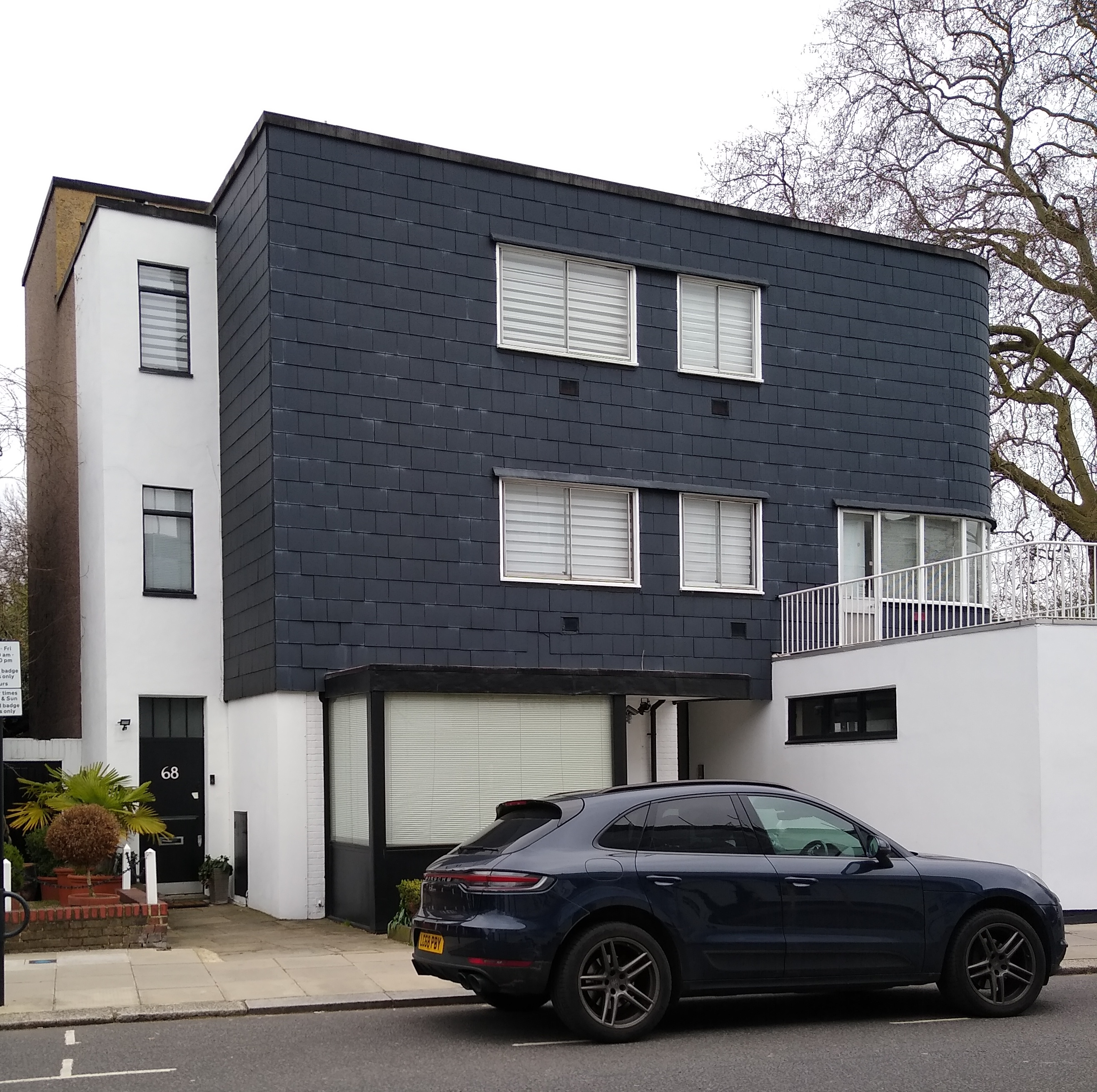
66 Old Church Street

66 Old Church Street, also known as Levy House, is a house on Old Church Street in Chelsea, London. It was designed by Walter Gropius and Maxwell Fry between 1935 and 1936 for the politician and playwright Benn Levy.

Levy House is part of a joint development with Cohen House. It was listed at Grade II on the National Heritage List for England in 1970.
