= Mile Cross Estate, Norwich =

Council estate in Norwich, England

Coordinates: 52.6503°N 1.2763°E

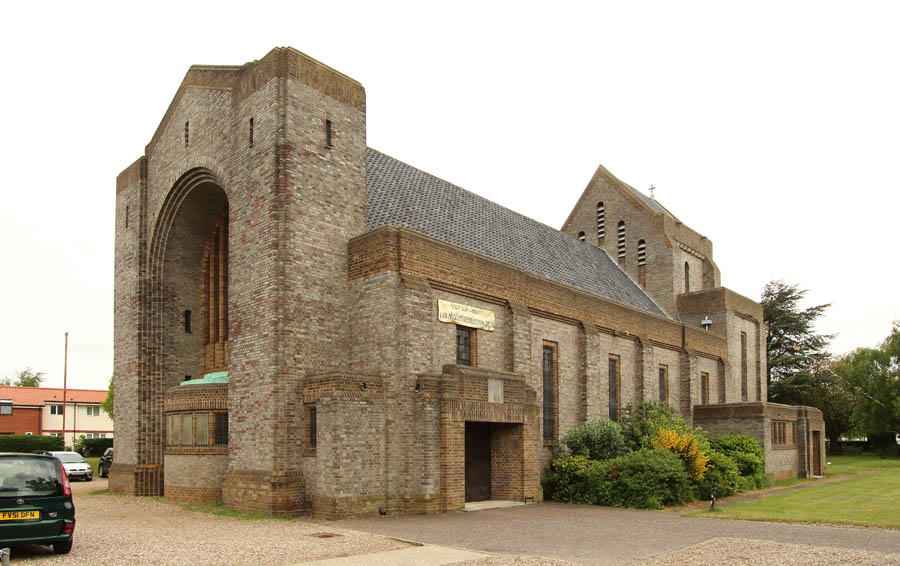
St Catherine's Church

Mile Cross Estate is a council estate in Norwich, England. The population of the Mile Cross Ward in Norwich at the 2011 census was 10,655.

== Location ==
The roughly triangular shaped estate is approximately 2 miles (3.2 km) north-west of the city centre is bounded to the east and west by Aylsham Road and Drayton Road respectively and Boundary Road and Mile Cross Lane to the north. Mile Cross Road bisects the estate from north to south.

== History ==
Mile Cross was one of the first housing estates in Norwich, and was built in the 1920s as part of the "Homes fit for heroes" scheme. It was planned on garden suburb principles by town planner Professor Adshead and involved four prominent local architects; Stanley Wearing, A. F. Scott, George Skipper and S. J. Livock. The estate was developed as a community and included infrastructure such as schools, churches, shops, pubs, community centres, allotments and public open spaces.

== Conservation area ==
On 2 January 1979 the majority of the estate was designated a conservation area covering 163 acres (66 ha). The conservation area can be split into four distinct areas: Sub area A is the first phase of the development and includes Losinga Crescent and Suckling Avenue and is characterised by classically styled houses based on Georgian designs. Sub area B is the second phase and includes Margaret Paston Avenue and Oxnead Road. A greater variety of materials such as tile-hanging and mock-timber framing were used. Sub area C was extended from the estate to include four significant buildings; St Catherine's Church, church hall, vicarage and the adjacent Mile Cross library. Sub areas D also includes several areas of new housing not of historic interest.

== Notable buildings and structures ==
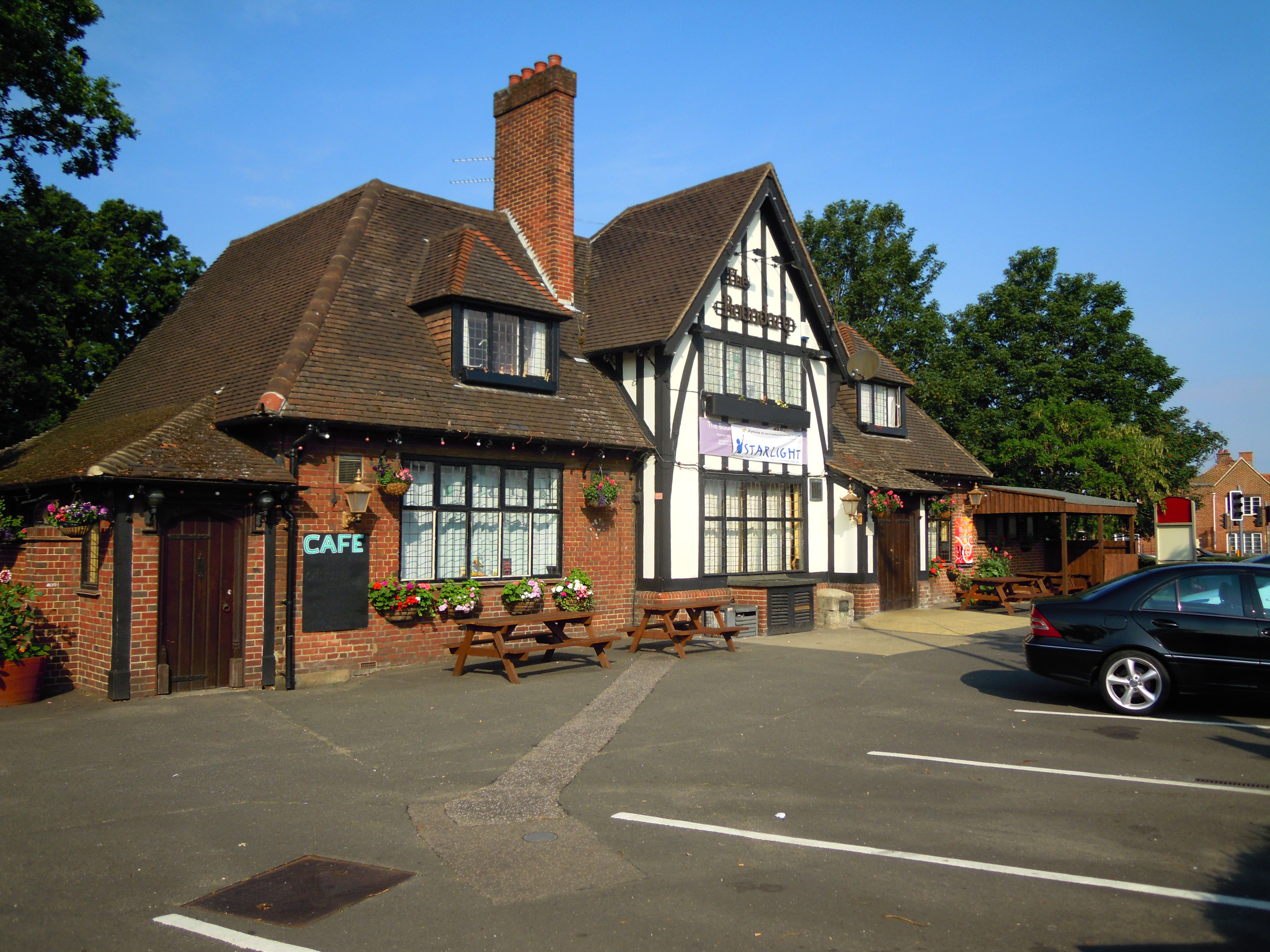
The Boundary public house

St Catherine's Church was built in 1933–35 by architects Caroe and Robinson. Described as a "fusion of Romanesque and modern styles; its powerful interior; its impressive detailing; and its overall monumentality" is finished in buff-brown and grey-purple bricks and was listed Grade II* in 2006. The adjacent church hall has been listed Grade II and the vicarage is of local interest. Close by and also of note is the Mile Cross library. At three corners of the estate are three landmark buildings. The former Galley Hill public house (currently (2013) trading as a hair and beauty salon) and the Boundary public house. Located on the junction of Mile Cross Road and Drayton Road are the shopping parades finished in red brick and pantiles.

== Parks and open spaces ==
There are several open spaces within the conservation area including Mile Cross Gardens which was opened in May 1929 to a design by Parks Superintendent Captain Sandys-Winch. The Grade II listed park contain features including concrete pavilions from the original layout. Many of the principal routes within the conservation area are planted with a diverse range of trees. Large species including horse chestnut, lime and plane have been planted. Minor and quiet roads have medium and smaller decorative species of tree, these range from robinia to sorbus.

== Street names ==
Many of the public thoroughfares on the estate are named after people and places of a local historic interest.

- William Appleyard – died in the early part of the 15th century was elected Mayor of Norwich on six occasions. Today (2013) his former house is the home to the city's Bridewell Museum.
- John Bassingham – was a 16th-century goldsmith.
- Thomas Bignold founded the Norwich Union insurance company.
- Francis Blomefield – Rector of Fersfield was an antiquary who projected a county history of Norfolk.
- Robert Brazier – Sheriff of Norwich in 1403 and Mayor in 1410.
- Edward Bulmer – an accomplished musician and later became Canon of Norwich Cathedral.
- Horatio Bolingbroke – in 1819 he was chosen as the Mayor of Norwich.
- John Bowyers – Bishop of Thetford in 1903.
- Francis Burges – published The Norwich Post the country's first provincial newspaper.
- William Chambers – Sheriff of Norwich in 1834.
- John Dowson – a solicitor, spent much of his wealth in improving education in Norwich and Norfolk.
- Luke Hansard – a printer, became head of Hansard the Printer and gives his name to the Hansard periodical.
- John Kirkpatrick – 17th century Scottish clergymen became treasurer of the Great Hospital in Norwich.
- Mark Knights – born in 1844, he became a journalist and chief reporter for the Eastern Daily Press.
- William Lefroy – Irish born Lefroy was Dean of Norwich between 1889 and 1909.
- Herbert Losinga – 1st Bishop of Norwich.
- John Marshall – Mayor of Norwich in 1828 and in 1841.
- Margaret Paston – Married John Paston in 1440. Her letters have become a rich source of information of 15th century Norfolk life.
- Samuel Parr – Headmaster of Norwich School from 1779 to 1785.
- Thomas Pinder – Headmaster of two schools in Norwich.
- Walter Rye – Mayor of Norwich 1908–1909. He wrote many books and articles researching Norfolk history.
- Richard Spynk – was a large benefactor to the cost and chief organiser of completing the City of Norwich walls.
- Robert Suckling – Mayor of Norwich in 1572 and 1582.
- Edward Valpy – Headmaster of Norwich School for 19 years.
- Francis Wheeler – Headmaster of Bracondale School, Norwich for many years.
- Samuel Woodward – earned his living in the textile trade and later became a distinguished amateur geologist.
