= Harold Theobald =

English cricketer

Personal information
- Full name: Harold Ernest Theobald
- Born: 18 March 1896; Norwich, Norfolk, England
- Died: 20 July 1982 (aged 86); Norwich, Norfolk, England
- Batting: Right-handed

Domestic team information
- Years: Team
- 1938: Minor Counties
- 1930–1947: Norfolk

Career statistics
| Competition | First-class |
|---|---|
| Matches | 1 |
| Runs scored | 42 |
| Batting average | 21.00 |
| 100s/50s | –/– |
| Top score | 42 |
| Balls bowled | – |
| Wickets | – |
| Bowling average | – |
| 5 wickets in innings | – |
| 10 wickets in match | – |
| Best bowling | – |
| Catches/stumpings | 1/– |
- Source: Cricinfo, 16 May 2012

Harold Ernest Theobald (18 March 1896 – 20 July 1982) was an English cricketer. Theobald was a right-handed batsman. He was born at Norwich, Norfolk, and was educated at both Bracondale School and Taunton School.

Theobald made his debut in county cricket for Norfolk against the Kent Second XI in the 1930 Minor Counties Championship. Prior to the start of World War II in 1939, he made a total of 50 appearances for the county in the Minor Counties Championship. In 1938, he made a single first-class appearance for a combined Minor Counties team against Oxford University at the University Parks. He batted twice during the match, being dismissed for 41 in the Minor Counties first-innings by Mervyn Austin, while in their second-innings he was dismissed for a duck by Edward Scott. Following the war, he resumed playing Minor counties cricket for Norfolk, making a further five appearances for the county, the last of which came against the Surrey Second XI in 1947. During his time playing for Norfolk, he also shared in a Minor counties record first-wicket partnership with David Walker of 323.

Outside of cricket he also played football for Gloucester City, Norwich YMCA and for Norfolk. Outside of sport, he worked as sales director for Norvic Shoe Limited. He died at the city of his birth of 20 July 1982.
