= Amy Sloan =

Canadian actress

- Born: Gladstone, Manitoba, Canada
- Occupation: Actress
- Years active: 2000-present

Amy Kathleen Sloan is a Canadian-American actress. She was born in Gladstone, Manitoba, raised in Whitehorse, Yukon and graduated from the National Theatre School of Canada.

== Filmography ==
=== Film ===
Year	Title	Role	Notes
2001	Xchange	Glowacki 1	
2002	Summer	Ella	
2002	Jack & Ella	Ella	
2002	Wicked Minds	Nicole	
2003	Lost Junction	Teller	
2004	The Aviator	Howard Hughes' Mother	
2004	Pact with the Devil	Sybil	
2004	The Day After Tomorrow	Elsa	
2004	Head in the Clouds	Linda	
2005	Pterodactyl	Kate Heinlein	
2007	Crime Fiction	Hilary	
2007	The Heartbreak Kid	Deborah	
2009	Waiting for Ophelia	Ophelia	
2011	From the Head	Sophia	
2012	Mulligans	Alice	
2013	A Single Shot	Carla	
2015	Nostradamus	Silas	Short film
2019	The Song of Names	Enid Simmonds	
2022	88	Agatha Frost	

=== Television ===
Year	Title	Role	Notes
2000	A Diva's Christmas Carol	Patrice	TV film
2001	Heart: The Marilyn Bell Story	Joan	
2001	The Killing Yard	Mary Jo	TV film
2001	Largo Winch	Liane Helms	"Sylvia"
2001–02	Big Wolf on Campus	Hillary Choate	"Hellection", "The Mertonator"
2002	Gleason	Geraldine Halford	TV film
2003	Wicked Minds	Nicole	TV film
2004	Stargate SG-1	Leda Kane	"Icon"
2004	Man in the Mirror: The Michael Jackson Story	Holly	TV film
2004	Jack & Bobby	Tammy Wheeler	"The Kindness of Strangers"
2004	NCIS	P.O. Cynthia Cluxton	"Lt. Jane Doe"
2004	Without a Trace	Kristen Walters	"Risen"
2005	Crimes of Passion	Shannon Dennings	TV film
2005	Cold Case	Leah	"Wishing"
2005	Inconceivable	Dottie	"Balls in Your Court"
2005	CSI: Crime Scene Investigation	Christina Adalian	"Secrets & Flies"
2005	Crossing Jordan	Natalie Goodson	"A Man in Blue"
2006	Close to Home	Joyce Birdseye	"Land of Opportunity"
2006	Numb3rs	Kari Syles	"Blackout"
2006	Gilmore Girls	Sheila	Recurring role
2006	Sex, Power, Love & Politics	Charlotte	TV film
2007–08	Big Shots	Wendy Mixworthy	Main role
2008	Without a Trace	Jill Haber	"Driven"
2009	Grey's Anatomy	Kelly	"Stairway to Heaven"
2009	Out of Control	Lisa Grant	TV film
2009	Heroes: Nowhere Man	Lauren Shapiro	TV miniseries
2010	Amish Grace	Rachel Knepp	TV film
2010	Hawthorne	Dana Hyun	"Road Narrows"
2010	Mad Men	Jean Rose	"The Chrysanthemum and the Sword"
2010	The Event	Leanne Timmons	"To Keep Us Safe"
2011	Big Love	Mitch	"A Seat at the Table"
2011	NCIS: Los Angeles	Patricia Dunn	"The Job"
2011	The Closer	Sara Banks	"Repeat Offender"
2011–13	Call Me Fitz	Dot Foxley	Recurring role
2012	Harry's Law	Mrs. Drake	"Les Horribles"
2012	Touch	Becca Klepper	"Pilot", "1+1=3"
2012	Haven	Lynette	"Double Jeopardy"
2012	Hawaii Five-O	Lindsay O'Connell	"Wahine'inoloa"
2013	The List	Anne	TV film
2013	Republic of Doyle	Eileen Jamison	"Gimme Shelter"
2015	12 Monkeys	Elena	"Yesterday", "Tomorrow", "Divine Move"
2020	L.A.'s Finest	Marjorie Nash	"Kangaroo Jack"

=== Stage ===
- All My Sons - Ann Deever Geffen Playhouse
- How the Light Gets In - Grace Wheeler. Boston Court

== Awards and nominations ==
For her work on the TV series Call Me Fitz, episode "Are You There God? I Need to Speak to Frank", Sloan was nominated at the 2nd Canadian Screen Awards in the category of "Best performance by an actress in a featured supporting role or guest role in a comedic series".
