= Arcadia Shipmanagement =

Greek oil tanker shipping company

Arcadia Shipmanagement Co. Ltd.
- Industry: Shipping, petroleum
- Founded: 1998
- Headquarters: Athens, Greece
- Key people: Giorgos Angelopoulos (Executive Chairman); Panagiotis Angelopoulos (Executive Vice Chairman)
- Website: www.arcadiasm.gr

Arcadia Shipmanagement Co. Ltd. is an oil tanker shipping company in Athens, Greece. It specializes in the shipping of oil, and other petroleum products.

== Management ==
Arcadia Shipmanagement Co. Ltd. is run by its founder, Constantine Angelopoulos, and his sons, Panagiotis Angelopoulos and Giorgos Angelopoulos.

== History ==
Arcadia Shipmanagement Co. Ltd. was established in 1998, by Constantine Angelopoulos. The company was named the Greek oil tanker company of the year in 2007. It completed an expansion to its fleet of oil tankers in 2012. In 2012, the company was also certified for good energy consumption. In 2015, the company added two Suezmax tankers to its fleet.

== Fleet ==
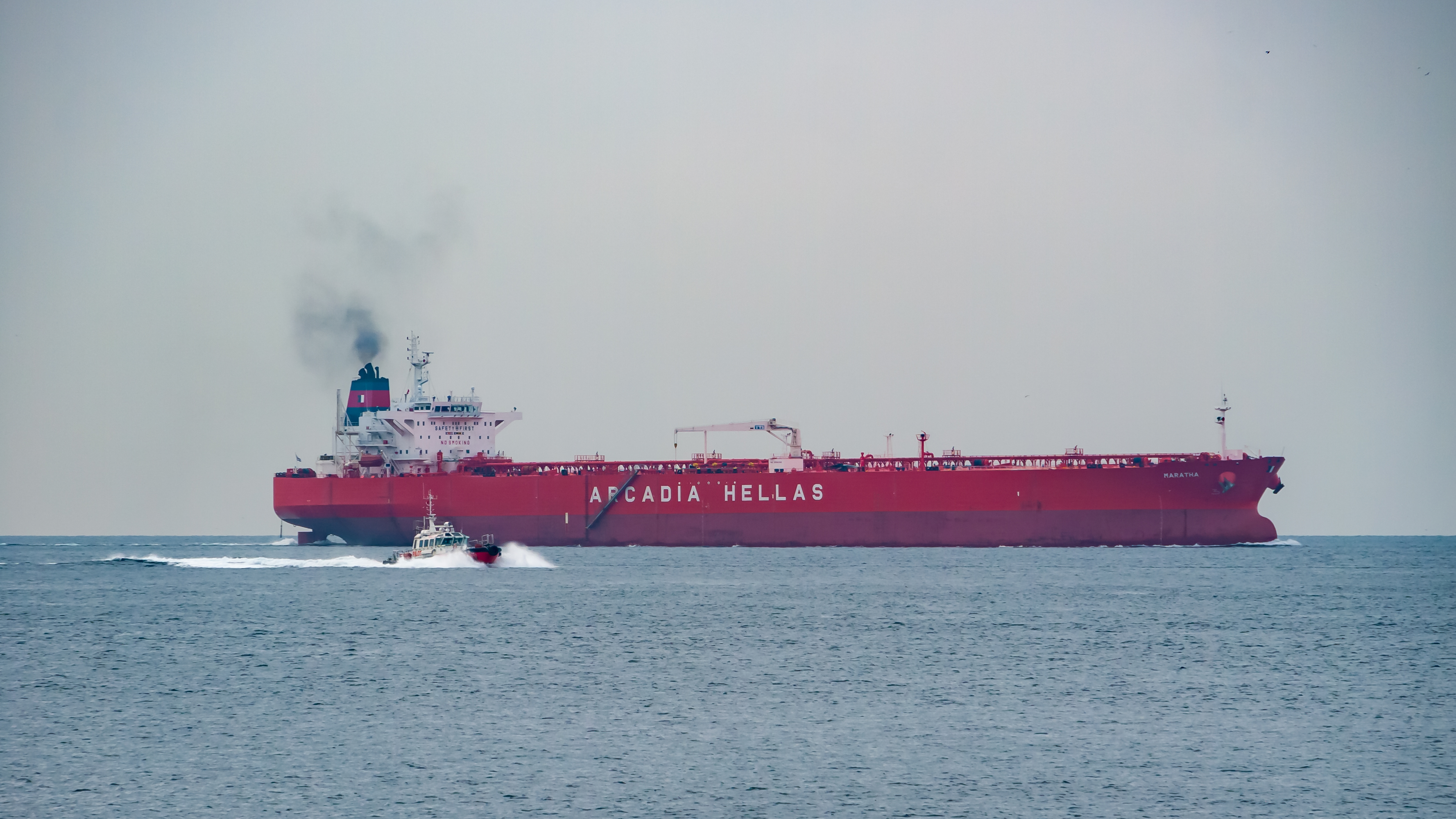
Oil tanker Maratha in Istanbul

Arcadia Shipmanagement Co. Ltd. has a fleet of 13 oil tankers.
