= Cohen House, London =

House in Chelsea, London, England

Coordinates: 51.48763°N 0.17403°W

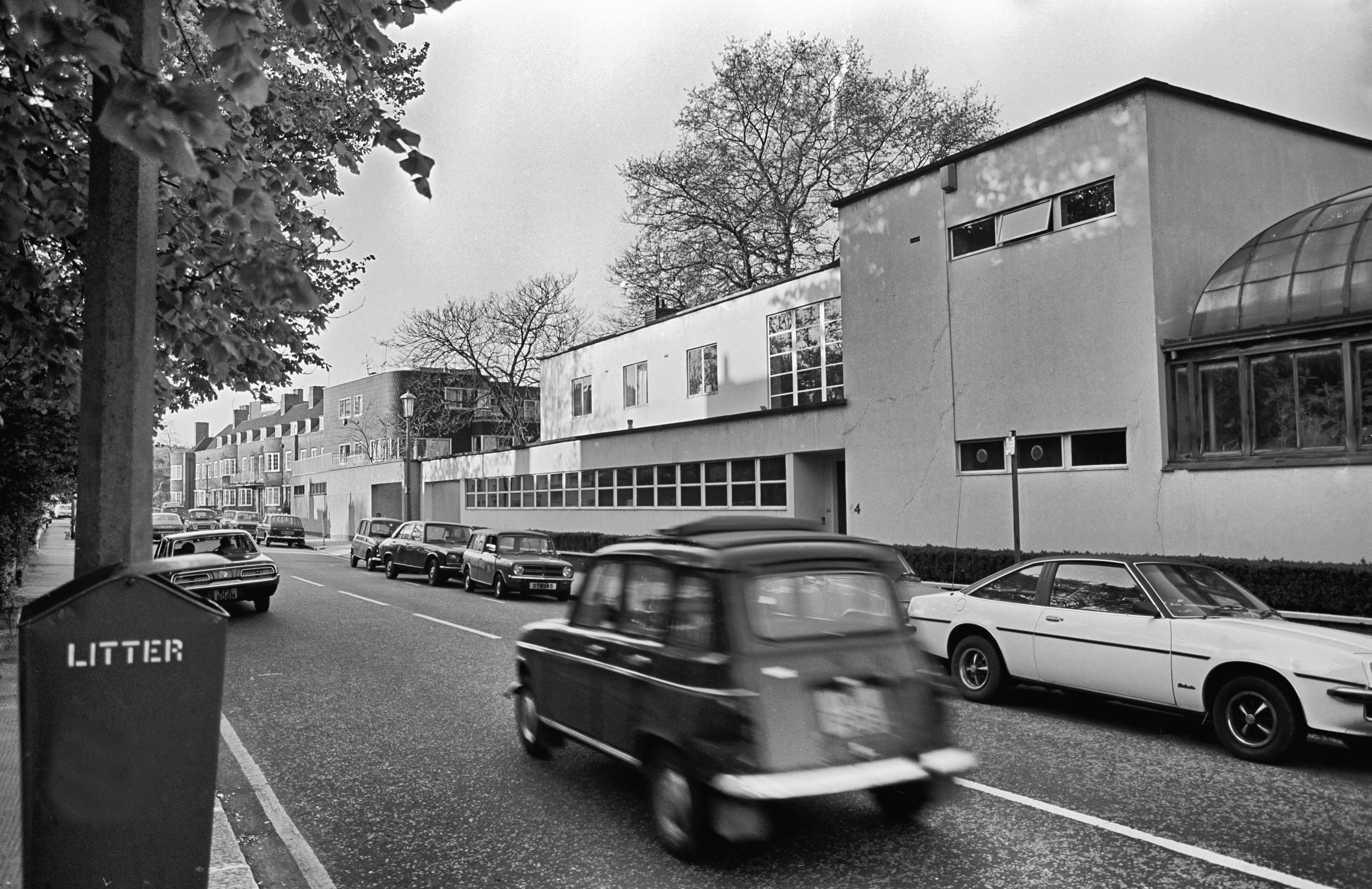
Cohen House

Cohen House is a private house on Old Church Street in Chelsea, London. It was designed and built in 1935–1936 by the architects Erich Mendelsohn and Serge Chermayeff, with Birkin Haward, for the Cohen family.

It adjoins the house at 66 Old Church Street built at the same time by Walter Gropius and Maxwell Fry for a cousin of the Cohens.

The latter house has been altered beyond recognition but by comparison Cohen House is well preserved. The large conservatory, to the design of Norman Foster, was added at the south end of the house in the 1970s for Sir Paul Hamlyn.

The house and its immediate neighbour were prominent modernist housing in a city still then largely untouched by Modern architecture. It 1970 it was listed Grade II* on the National Heritage List for England.
