= Gianluigi Porelli EuroLeague Executive of the Year =

The Gianluigi Porelli EuroLeague Executive of the Year is an annual award of Europe's premier level men's basketball league, the EuroLeague. The award was introduced in the 2004–05 season. It is given to the league's best club CEO of each season. The winner receives the trophy after the end of the season, in recognition of their efforts to reach the highest levels of success with their club.

== History ==
José Antonio Querejeta, of Baskonia, was the first recipient of the award, as his team reached the EuroLeague 2004–05 season's EuroLeague Final. In 2014, the award was officially named after Gianluigi Porelli, long-time owner of Virtus Bologna and first president of ULEB.

== EuroLeague Club Executive of the Year ==
Season	Executive of the Year	Nationality	Team
2004–05	José Antonio Querejeta	Spain	TAU Cerámica
2005–06	Sergey Kushchenko	Russia	CSKA Moscow
2006–07	Juan Manuel Rodríguez	Spain	Unicaja
2007–08	Ferdinando Minucci	Italy	Montepaschi Siena
2008–09	Marco Baldi	Germany	Alba Berlin
2009–10	Przemysław Sęczkowski	Poland	Asseco Prokom Gdynia
2010–11	Pavlos & Thanasis Giannakopoulos	Greece	Panathinaikos
2011–12	Panagiotis & George Angelopoulos	Greece	Olympiacos
2012–13	Tuncay Özilhan	Turkey	Anadolu Efes
2013–14	Livio Proli	Italy	EA7 Emporio Armani Milan
2014–15	Marco Baldi (2x)	Germany	Alba Berlin (2x)
2015–16	José Antonio Querejeta (2x)	Spain	Laboral Kutxa Vitoria-Gasteiz (2x)
2016–17	Maurizio Gherardini	Italy	Fenerbahçe
2017–18	Paulius Motiejūnas	Lithuania	Žalgiris
2018–19	Paulius Motiejūnas (2x)	Lithuania	Žalgiris (2x)
2020–21	Alper Yılmaz	Turkey	Anadolu Efes
2021–22	Alper Yılmaz	Turkey	Anadolu Efes (2x)
2022–23	Paulius Motiejūnas (3x)	Lithuania	Žalgiris (3x)
2023–24	Vassilis Parthenopoulos	Greece	Panathinaikos (2x)
2024–25	Derya Yannier	Turkey	Fenerbahçe (2x)
2025–26	Paulius Jankūnas	Lithuania	Žalgiris (4x)
