= September Tapes =

2004 film directed by Christian Johnston

- Directed by: Christian Johnston
- Written by: Christian Van Gregg; Christian Johnston
- Produced by: Matthew Rhodes; Wali Razaqi; Christian Johnston; George Calil; Judd Payne
- Starring: George Calil; Wali Razaqi; Sunil Sadarangani
- Narrated by: George Calil
- Cinematography: Christian Johnston
- Edited by: Darren Mann; Jeffro Brunk; Peter Finestone
- Music by: Gunnard Doboze
- Distributed by: First Look Pictures
- Release date: September 24, 2004
- Running time: 95 min.
- Country: United States
- Languages: English; Persian

September Tapes is a faux-documentary feature film co-written and directed by Christian Johnston in his feature debut. An early review of the film's promotional trailer noted that the footage looked "more real than network news footage".

== Distribution ==
The film was first presented at the Sundance Film Festival in January 2004, where First Look Media acquired worldwide distribution rights. In May of the same year, it was featured at the Cannes Film Festival.

The film screened at many other film festivals, including: the Deauville American Film Festival, France; the Copenhagen International Documentary Festival, Denmark; the Amsterdam Fantastic Film Festival, Netherlands; and others.

The film is translated to "Septiembre Negro" ("Black September") for Spanish-language audiences.

== See also ==
- Zero Dark Thirty
