= Pterodactyl (film) =

2005 American thriller film

- DVD cover
- Written by: Mark Sevi
- Directed by: Mark L. Lester
- Starring: Cameron Daddo; Coolio; Amy Sloan; George Calil; Mircea Monroe; Steve Braun; Todd Kramer
- Music by: John Dickson
- Country of origin: United States; Czech Republic; Russia; Armenia
- Original language: English

Production
- Producers: Dana Dubovsky; Mark L. Lester
- Running time: 89 mins

Original release
- Network: Sci Fi Channel
- Release: August 27, 2005

Pterodactyl is a 2005 American thriller film that premiered on the Sci Fi Channel. The film is directed by Mark L. Lester.

== Plot ==
After a long dormant volcano suddenly becomes active again, a nest of mysterious eggs are unearthed and begin to hatch, revealing themselves as prehistoric pterodactyls. A trio of hunters, scouting the Turkish–Armenian border are suddenly attacked by a pterodactyl. While defending themselves, they become outmatched and are all killed.

Michael, a paleontology professor, and Kate, his former student who now works as his partner, are leading a group of teenagers through a scientific field trip to the volcano, where Michael hopes to uncover prehistoric fossils for his research. The students are Gwen, Jason, Willis, and Angie. They stop at a Turkish forest and begin exploring. After stopping to use the bathroom, Willis trips over a tree and falls into a mound of urine, which they suspect to belong to birds. After examining it for a while, the group returns to the Jeep and drives further into the woods, stopping a few hours later to set up camp. After getting situated, Angie wanders off and decides to go for a swim. When she jumps into the water, a pterodactyl appears and attacks her. She struggles to escape, and runs into Jason, who was searching for Angie. In the confusion, he moves to the lake to investigate. Upon reaching the lake, the pterodactyl drags him away. Angie tells the others that she was attacked by something that looked like a bird, but Michael dismisses the idea. Michael and Willis desperately go searching for Jason, but unnoticed by them, he has been killed.

Simultaneously, Captain Bergen and his squad are patrolling the forest for Yolen, an Armenian terrorist wanted by the government and with whom Bergen has a personal vendetta, with Yolen having executed several soldiers that Bergen himself trained and served with. After systematically eliminating several terrorist camps in the area, the squad finally locates and captures Yolen.

The next morning, while preparing to leave, Michael's jeep is ambushed by a group of terrorists, looking for Yolen. Bergen and his squad watch from the tree line, preparing to attack when Michael's group is clear. They are forced into action quicker than anticipated when a group of pterodactyls descends on the group, killing the terrorists and allowing Michael and his group to flee, with Bergen covering them. In the struggle, Gwen is killed by a pterodactyl while escaping. After getting clear of the area, Michael questions the presence of the soldiers, and Bergen says that he and his squad members have been assigned to capture Yolen by hand. Bergen and his squad initially have no interest in helping escort Michael and his group to safety, believing their mission to be of the utmost importance. However, Bergen changes his mind when he learns that he served with Kate's father. Bergen agrees to escort the civilians back to town. While the group continue on foot, Angie shows her feelings to Willis, admiring his bravery.

After attempting to move across a clearing, the group is ambushed by the pterodactyls again. Two of Bergen's soldiers, Burroughs and Chief, are killed in the attack and a third, Clarke, is abducted and flown away. Yolen attempts to escape in the confusion, only to be tackled by Bergen and restrained. Angie is grabbed by a pterodactyl, having her arm severed, and is soon dropped, succumbing to her injuries soon after. Despite driving off the rest of the pterodactyls, Kate is snatched and flown to the nest. After the attack, Captain Bergen and the group continue in order to find a shelter. Although they locate a hunting cabin, the pterodactyls attack soon after, injuring Zelazny, and Willis. Bergen identifies an alpha pterodactyl, noticeable by the many scars that adorn its body, and Michael surmises that if they were to kill it, the rest of the flock would be too unorganized to attack again. With Willis unable to walk and Zelazny gravely injured, they are forced to remain behind in the shelter while Bergen, Michael, and the lone remaining soldier, Serling, travel to the volcano to rescue Kate.

Later, after patching up Willis, Zelazny dies from her wounds and Willis is killed by invading pterodactyls shortly after. Meanwhile, in the nest, Kate manages to grab the radio from Clarke, who has been feasted on by the baby pterodactyls, and contacts Bergen. She escapes the nest and reunites with the group, although they are separated by a deep chasm. After waiting overnight, a rescue line is set up for Kate to cross. Serling traverses the line to rescue Kate, but during the return trip, the pterodactyls awaken and begin attacking. Bergen attempts to cover the two by shooting at the flock, but is knocked out by one. Yolen successfully convinces Michael to give him a gun to help fight off the approaching pterodactyls. However, he attempts to kill Michael instead before being grabbed by a pterodactyl and dropped into the nest, where he is devoured by the babies. Despite the best efforts of Michael and Bergen, the pterodactyls manage to cut the line, dropping Serling into the chasm while Kate manages to swing to safety. Mortally wounded, Serling manages to detonate an explosive in the nest, destroying it and a majority of the pterodactyls. Bergen salutes Serling as he succumbs to his wounds.

After climbing down the mountain, the Alpha Pterodactyl makes one last attempt to kill the group. Bergen fires a missile saying, "the music's coming down and guess what I'm your DJ", but the Alpha, who had successfully evaded the missile several times before, manages to avoid it again and kill Bergen. Michael, despite Kate's objections, manages keeps the missile on target and finally kills the beast. As Kate and Michael share a kiss and walk away, an Allosaurus emerges from the volcano's crater.

== Cast ==
- Cameron Daddo as Professor Michael Lovecraft
- Coolio as Captain Bergen
- Amy Sloan as Kate Heinlein
- George Calil as Serling
- Steve Braun as Willis Bradbury
- Mircea Monroe as Angie Lem
- Jessica Ferrarone as Zelazny
- Todd Kramer as Clarke

Many of the characters are named after famous science-fiction and fantasy writers—Bradbury (Ray Bradbury), Burroughs (Edgar Rice Burroughs), Clarke (Sir Arthur C. Clarke), Donaldson (Steven Donaldson), Heinlein (Robert A. Heinlein), Herbert (Frank Herbert), Lem (Stanislaw Lem), Lovecraft (H. P. Lovecraft), Serling (Rod Serling), Yolen (Jane Yolen) and Zelazny (Roger Zelazny).

== Location ==
Despite the dialogue indicating that the events are taking place on the Turkish–Armenian border (a dry, rocky, mountainous area), the landscape in the film is wooded forestland with open grassy knolls in the Czech Republic.

== See also ==
- List of films featuring dinosaurs
