= George Calil =

English actor

- Born: 29 March 1973 (age 53); England
- Occupation: Actor
- Years active: 1996–present
- Father: Ely Calil

George Calil (born 29 March 1973) is an English actor known for his role in the TV mini-series Band of Brothers, where he portrayed Sergeant James H. "Mo" Alley, Jr.

== Early life ==
Calil was born in England in 1973. He is the son of Lebanese businessman Ely Calil.

== Career ==
In 2004, Calil starring in the special drama September Tapes, as Don Larson, American journalist who travels to Afghanistan one year after 9/11, in an effort to learn the truth about the search for Osama bin Laden. The film premiered and sold at the Sundance Film Festival. Also in 2004 he played the role of Pompey the Great in the remake of the 1960 film Spartacus.

In 2005 he starred in four feature films, Rollin' with the Nines, Pterodactyl, and The Film Maker, and in 2006 he played the lead role of Detective Alex Taylor in the feature film Lycanthropy.

== Personal life ==
Calil met fellow actress Laura Sadler in 2002, when he guest-starred in the BBC drama, Holby City, and the two began dating. Calil played the drug-dealing boyfriend of Sadler's character, Sandy Harper, who was a cast regular for 11 episodes, until his storyline concluded.

In the early hours of 15 June 2003, Sadler fell 40 feet (12 metres) from the balcony of Calils flat at 85 Holland Park. She had consumed a large quantity of alcohol and was later found to have had traces of diazepam and cocaine derivatives in her blood. She suffered severe head injuries and never regained consciousness. Her family decided to take her off life support on 18 June 2003. Sadler died at Charing Cross Hospital a day later. Her funeral was held at St. Mary's and All Saints' Church in Beaconsfield, and she was cremated at Chilterns Crematorium, Amersham. Calil was questioned by police, but later released on bail and never charged. Sadler's death was ruled as an accident.

Calil made a brief appearance at Sadler's main funeral, but stayed away from the private family service and left a red rose, signed "G".

== Filmography ==
=== Film ===
Year	Title	Role	Notes
1996	Tiger Heart	Jack	
2004	September Tapes	Don 'Lars' Larson	
2004	EMR	Agent 6	
2005	Pterodactyl	Sterling	
2006	Rollin' with the Nines	Detective Newmyer	
2006	The Other Half	Alex	
2006	Lycanthropy	Alex Taylor	
2007	Rise of the Footsoldier	Police Killer	
2008	Bad Day	Harry McCann	
2009	31 North 62 East	Jacob	

=== Television ===
Year	Title	Role	Notes
2001	Band of Brothers	James H. (Mo) Alley Jr.	8 episodes
2001	The Lost Battalion	Pvt. Lowell R. Hollingshead	Television film
2002	Relic Hunter	Relic Hunter	Episode: "So Shall It Be"
2002	Waking the Dead	David Gold	2 episodes
2002–2003	Holby City	Sean Hunt	11 episodes
2004	Spartacus	Pompey	Miniseries
2006	The Miracles of Jesus	Jesus	Miniseries
2007	Wraiths of Roanoke	Thomas Stevens	Television film
2009	The Bill	Kevin Gearie	Episode: "Innocence Betrayed"
