= From the Head =

2011 film by George Griffith

From The Head
- Film poster
- Directed by: George Griffith
- Written by: George Griffith
- Produced by: Jeffrey Doornbos; Russell Gray; Christopher Lemole
- Starring: George Griffith; Matthew Lillard; Jeffrey Doornbos; Samantha Lemole
- Cinematography: Martin Matiásek
- Edited by: John Coniglio
- Release date: June 24, 2011
- Running time: 95 minutes
- Country: United States
- Language: English

From the Head is a 2011 American drama film written and directed by George Griffith in his directorial debut. The film stars Griffith, Matthew Lillard, Jeffrey Doornbos and Samantha Lemole in the lead roles. From the Head was touted as a "micro-budgeted indie" from a "veteran strip club bathroom attendant" (Griffith).

== Plot ==
The movie portrays the men and women who populate a strip club and their effect on the resident bathroom attendant's psyche.

== Cast ==
- George Griffith as Shoes
- Matthew Lillard as Jimmy
- Jeffrey Doornbos as Gordy
- Samantha Lemole as Ruby
- Ahna O'Reilly as Lily
- Jon Polito as Vinnie
- James Urbaniak as Danny
- Amy Sloan as Sophia
- Giuseppe Andrews as Ramone

== Reception ==
In his 2018 autobiography Room To Dream, director David Lynch called it a "beautiful" work and said: "George made a film called From The Head...and when I saw it I knew he'd be a great Ray Monroe" (in Twin Peaks).

The Hollywood Reporter said it was "far more interesting than a film set entirely in a bathroom has a right to be." Shockya gave it an overall B− rating, calling it "a movie of considerable if to-scale surprises."
