= Theodore Angelopoulos =

Greek shipping and steel magnate (born 1943)

- Θεόδωρος Αγγελόπουλος
- Born: Theodore P. Angelopoulos; March 17, 1943 (age 83); Vlachorrapti, Greece
- Education: University of Zurich
- Occupations: steel and shipping businessman
- Years active: 1969–
- Spouse: Gianna Angelopoulos-Daskalaki

Theodore P. Angelopoulos (born 1943) is a Greek shipping and steel magnate.

== Early life ==
Theodore Angelopoulos was born in Athens, Hellenic State, and lived in Switzerland for many years, where he received a BSc in Business Administration from the University of Zurich. His family were pioneers in the Greek steel industry and began dealing in the dry cargo sector of the shipping industry in the early 1950s.

== Career ==
Angelopoulos built an internationally based group of companies with interests in shipping and steel, and with investments in real estate and private equities, as well as other financial entities worldwide.

In 1996, he established Metrostar Management in Athens, and his company became one of the world's leading oil tanker operators. In 2002 he took control of the Dutch shipbuilding company Oceanco and reestablished it as a leading builder of custom luxury mega-yachts. Several years ago, Angelopoulos held a considerable minority stake in the Swiss bank UBS. However, as of March 2023, his name does not appear in any list of major shareholders.

== Personal life ==
Angelopoulos is married to Gianna Angelopoulos-Daskalaki.

His two nephews, Panagiotis Angelopoulos and Giorgos Angelopoulos are also in shipping and steel.

In 1990, Angelopoulos bought the Old Rectory in Chelsea, for some years London's largest and most expensive residential property, and probably the first in London to sell for more than £10 million.

In 2007, he had the 82-metre yacht Alfa Nero built. In 2011, it was listed for sale for US$115 million, and was bought by Russian billionaire Andrey Guryev.

As of 2014, Angelopoulos owns a new 66-metre yacht, Okto.
