= Henry Blunt (priest) =

Henry Blunt (1794–1843) was an evangelical cleric of the Church of England. He introduced an early parish magazine, Poor Churchman's Evening Companion, in his London parish of Chelsea.

== Life ==
The son of Henry Blunt and his wife Mary Atkinson, he was born at Dulwich, 12 August, and was baptised at the chapel of Dulwich College, 20 August 1794. He was educated at Merchant Taylors' School, which he entered in 1806, and left for Pembroke College, Cambridge, as Parkin exhibitioner, in 1813. He took his B.A. degree in 1817, and became fellow of his college.

Blunt was ordained on his fellowship by William Howley, Bishop of London, receiving deacon's orders 5 July 1818 and priest's orders 20 December of the same year. After having filled preacherships at the Philanthropic Institution of London, Park Chapel in Chelsea, and Grosvenor Chapel, in 1820 he was appointed vicar of Clare, Suffolk, where he took private pupils.

In 1824 Gerald Valerian Wellesley, a brother of the Duke of Wellington and then rector of Chelsea, London, induced Blunt to become his curate. He was there for six years, making a reputation as a preacher, and on the erection of Trinity Church, in Sloane Street in 1830, he was appointed its first incumbent, becoming a rector 15 June 1832. That year Lord Cadogan offered Blunt St Luke's Church, Chelsea as well, but was turned down. In 1835 he was presented by the Duke of Bedford to the rectory of Streatham, Surrey.

Lung disease compelled Blunt to pass winters at health resorts, and he died in his rectory, 20 July 1843, in his 49th year; he was buried at Streatham. As a churchman, Blunt was an evangelical opposed to tractarianism. Before he went to college, he, with a future brother-in-law, had established the first Sunday school at Chelsea at the Clock House. He introduced bible and communicants' classes, and published the first parish magazine, called the Poor Churchman's Evening Companion.

== Works ==
Blunt published courses of lectures delivered during Lent at Chelsea on the lives of biblical figures. The first of these were the Lectures on the Life of Jacob, delivered in 1823; these were succeeded by courses on St. Peter (1829), Abraham (1831), St. Paul in two series (1832, 1833), and closing with one on the Prophet Elisha in 1839, the six years' interval seeing the publication of three courses on The Life of Jesus Christ (1834–36), a volume of discourses on Some of the Doctrinal Articles of the Church of England in 1835, a volume of selected Sermons in 1837, and Expository Sermons on the Epistles to the Seven Churches in 1838. The last of Blunt's works published in his lifetime, besides sermons, was an Exposition of the Pentateuch (3 vols.).

Three posthumous volumes of Blunt's sermons were issued under the editorship of an old friend, the Rev. John Brown of Cheltenham, and passed through a number of editions. The lectures on St. Peter went through sixteen editions between 1829 and 1842, those on Jacob fifteen editions, 1828–40, those on Abraham eleven editions, 1831–44.

== Family ==
On 21 December 1820 Blunt married Julia Ann Nailer, one of six daughters of a merchant in Chelsea. Their son, Gerald Blunt, succeeded his father as rector at Chelsea.

== Notes ==
Attribution

This article incorporates text from a publication now in the public domain: Stephen, Leslie, ed. (1886). "Blunt, Henry". Dictionary of National Biography. Vol. 5. London: Smith, Elder & Co.
