= Giorgos Angelopoulos =

Greek businessman

Giorgos Angelopoulos Γιώργος Αγγελόπουλος
- Born: 17 November 1974 (age 51); Athens, Greece
- Occupations: Executive Chairman of Arcadia Shipmanagement Co. Ltd. Co–Owner of Olympiacos B.C.

Giorgos K. Angelopoulos (alternate spellings: Georgios, George, Aggelopoulos) (Greek: Γιώργος Κ. Αγγελόπουλος) is a Greek businessman who is involved in oil shipping and steel. He is the co-owner of the men's professional club basketball team, Olympiacos, along with his brother Panagiotis Angelopoulos.

== Angelopoulos family ==
Angelopoulos is the son of the Greek oil shipping and steel magnate Constantine Angelopoulos, and the grandson of the late Greek industrialist Panagiotis Angelopoulos (1909–2001). He is also the nephew of Theodore Angelopoulos. He is the brother of Panagiotis Angelopoulos.

== Businesses ==
Angelopoulos, along with his brother Panagiotis, is the co-owner of Arcadia Shipmanagement Co. Ltd.

== Olympiacos B.C. ==
Giorgos Angelopoulos and his brother, Panagiotis, won the EuroLeague Club Executive of the Year Award in the year 2012, after their professional basketball club, Olympiacos, won the EuroLeague 2011–12 season's championship.
