= Levington Research Station =

- Site in April 2009

- Location within Suffolk
- Former names: Fisons Research Station

General information
- Type: Horticultural Research Centre
- Location: Levington, Suffolk, IP10 0NE
- Coordinates: 52.012°N 1.262°E
- Elevation: 20 m (66 ft)
- Construction started: 1956
- Completed: 1957
- Inaugurated: 7 May 1957
- Client: Fisons

Dimensions
- Other dimensions: 7.5 hectares

Technical details
- Floor count: 4

The Levington Research Station is a fertiliser research institute in Suffolk.

== History ==
=== Fisons ===
It would be 60 acres. The other research site of Fisons was Chesterford Park Research Station.

It was opened on Tuesday May 7 1957 by Sir Alec Todd FRS, a Scottish biochemist, who won the Nobel Prize in Chemistry that same year for his important work on the phosphate structure of DNA, and attended by Sir Clavering Fison.

Around three hundred people worked at the site and it was one of Europe's largest research institutes in the field of fertiliser.

=== Ownership ===
On 1 January 1960, Fisons Horticulture and Fisons Fertilisers were formed. The research site worked with both.

The horticultural division of Fisons was sold off for £25.4m in a management buy out in 1994 known as Levington Horticulture; the division had around 280 people and around 26% of the UK market, turning over £47m. In 1997 this division was sold on again to the present ownership.

=== Fertiliser ===
The research site developed the first specialist sports turf fertiliser; typical agricultural fertiliser was too concentrated: this is now found at all main golf courses across Europe under the Greensmaster brand. Levington Horticulture also made Turfclear herbicide, and had a Royal Warrant.

=== Compost ===
The site is known for developing Levington Compost in the 1960s. The compost was made in South Yorkshire and the fertiliser was made at Bramford, west of Ipswich, next to the Great Eastern Main Line.

Levington Multi-Purpose Compost (when owned by Fisons) had a 1984 television advert featuring Jack and the Beanstalk.

=== Directors ===
- 1957 (James) Anderson Storrow (1915-2003)

=== Visits ===
On Tuesday 1 May 1956, during construction, the site was visited by the Duke of Edinburgh.

== Structure ==
It is in the East Suffolk district of Suffolk.

== See also ==
- History of fertilizer
- Macaulay Institute, Aberdeen, formerly the Macaulay Institute for Soil Research
- Sports Turf Research Institute
