= Ely Calil =

Lebanese businessman holding British citizenship (1945–2018)

- Born: 8 December 1945; Kano
- Died: 28 May 2018 (aged 72); London
- Spouses: Frances Condon (m. 1972, divorced) Hayat Emma Mroue (div. 1985) Renuka Jain (divorced)
- Children: 6, including George

Ely Calil (8 December 1945 – 28 May 2018) was a Lebanese businessman holding British citizenship. He was one of the richest men in Britain; The Sunday Times Magazine estimated his wealth in 2010 to be around £350 million.

== Life ==
His ancestry can be traced back to 1920s or 30s when his family set up their home in Turkey after leaving Lebanon, but then returned to Lebanon after Atatürk's policies discriminating against Christians. Before he was born, his family set up an oil mill for groundnut processing in Lebanon in 1941. His father, George Khalil, died in 1970, leaving behind two sons, Ely and Bernard, and was said to have bequeathed £20 million to Ely.

== Allegations ==
In 2002, Calil was arrested in Paris in connection with the Elf Aquitaine scandal but was released on appeal.

In 2004, Calil was alleged to be part in the failed coup d'état in Equatorial Guinea and was sought by courts both in Equatorial Guinea and South Africa. In September 2004, he was sued by the Equatorial Guinean government for allegedly having raised $750 000 to finance the plot.

== Personal life ==
Ely Calil was a father of six including actor George Calil, and was married three times. His first wife was a Tennessee tobacco heiress, Frances Condon. They married at a Roman Catholic church in Farm Street, Mayfair in 1972. They had two children: George and Katherine. His second wife was Lebanese socialite Hayat Emma Mroue who gave him two more children, Karim and May. They divorced in 1985 and afterwards she married property tycoon Lord Palumbo. Calil also has a son Stefan from a relationship with Noor Birol. Calil's third wife was Indian Renuka Jain, with whom he had a daughter, Yasmine. They also went on to divorce. In 2006 he sold his Chelsea home, Sloane House, for an estimated £45 million to Sir Anthony Bamford. He then lived in a rented £15 million mansion in Hampstead, London. He was known to be a very private person and did not give interviews to newspapers, and the press had taken only one photo of him over a forty-year period. In 2008 a gang of burglars targeted his home in Hampstead, but were caught by police and his possessions returned to him.

Calil died on 28 May 2018 after a fall down the stairs in his home.
