= Manolo Blahnik =

Spanish fashion designer (born 1942)

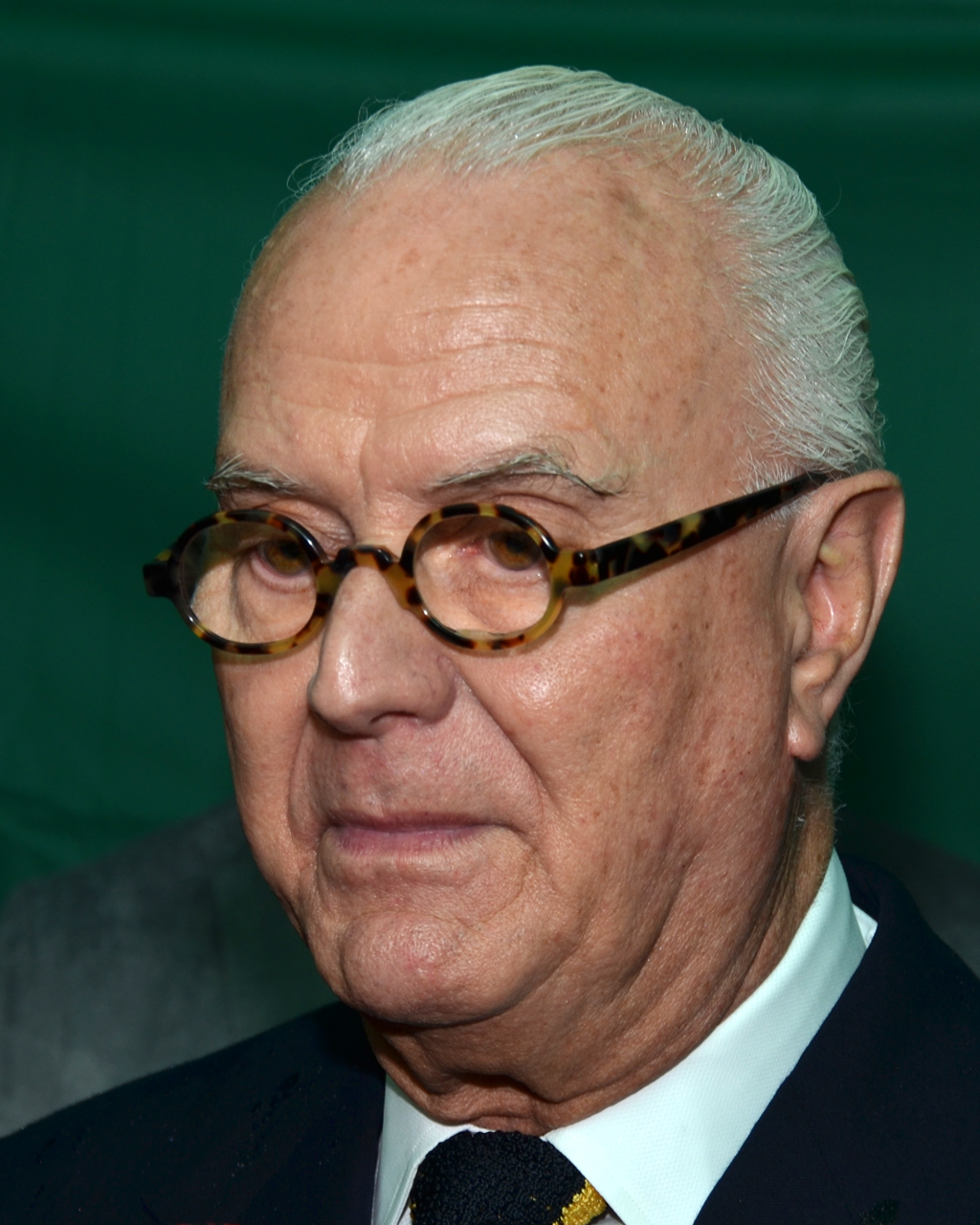
- Manolo Blahnik in Prague in 2017
- Born: Manuel Blahnik Rodríguez; 27 November 1942 (age 83); Santa Cruz de La Palma, Canary Islands, Spain
- Education: University of Geneva
- Occupation: Fashion designer
- Label: Manolo Blahnik
- Website: manoloblahnik.com

Manuel "Manolo" Blahnik Rodríguez (/məˈnoʊloʊ ˈblɑːnɪk/; born 27 November 1942) is a Spanish fashion designer and founder of the eponymous high-end shoe brand.

== Biography ==
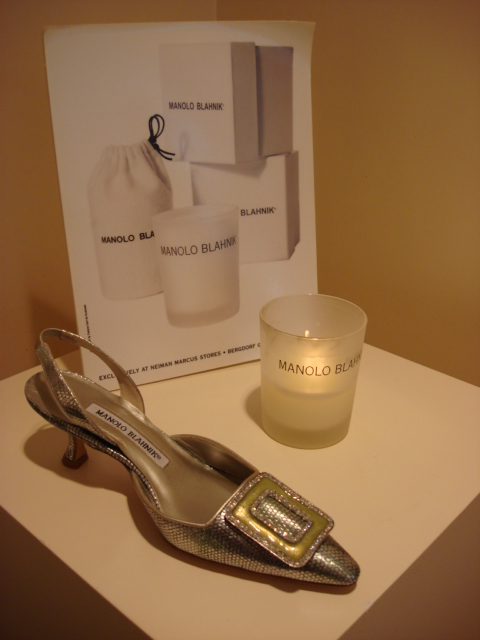
Display of a Manolo Blahnik shoe

Blahnik was born in Santa Cruz de la Palma, in the Canary Islands (Spain), to a Czech father and Spanish mother. His father left Prague in the 1930s to avoid rising fascism; his grandparents disappeared in the 1950s after the Communists took charge. His mother's family owned a banana plantation in the island city of Santa Cruz de la Palma, where he grew up alongside his sister, Evangelina. He was homeschooled as a child before eventually attending a Swiss boarding school. Later, his parents wanted him to be a diplomat and enrolled him at the University of Geneva, majoring in politics and law. However, Blahnik changed his majors to literature and architecture. In 1965, he got his degree and moved to Paris to study art at the École des Beaux-Arts and Stage Set Design at the Louvre Art School, all while working at a vintage clothing shop. In 1969, he moved to London to work as a buyer at the fashion boutique Feathers, and wrote for L’Uomo Vogue, an Italian men's version of Vogue.

In 1969, Blahnik had a chance to meet Diana Vreeland, the editor-in-chief of U.S. Vogue, while he was traveling in New York. He then presented his portfolio of fashions and set designs to Vreeland, at which point she looked him straight in the eye and said, "Young man, make things, make accessories, make shoes." She admired his shoe sketches and advised him to concentrate on designing footwear. Blahnik followed her advice and worked on designing shoes.

In 1971, Ossie Clark invited him to create shoes for his runway show. He also designed shoes for other London fashion designers, such as Jean Muir and Zandra Rhodes. From 1971, Blahnik was selling Manolo Blahnik shoes for Zapata. With a loan of £2,000, Blahnik bought the Zapata Shoe Company from its owner and opened his own boutique. In 1974, Blahnik became the second man ever to be featured on the cover of U.K. Vogue (after Helmut Berger).

In 1977, Blahnik created his first American collection. These were sold in 1978 through Bloomingdales. Blahnik opened his first boutique in the US in 1979.

Manolo Blahnik's flagship store remains in Old Church Street in the Chelsea district of London.

Blahnik's boutiques are located in London, New York, Geneva, Madrid, Barcelona, Moscow, Dubai, Abu Dhabi, Doha, Hong Kong, Kuala Lumpur, Seoul, Singapore, Tokyo, and Taipei. Bloomingdales (for which he created his first American collection), Nordstrom, Neiman Marcus, Barneys, Bergdorf Goodman and Saks Fifth Avenue carry his line in the United States and newly opened in Dubai Mall. The company has signed a long-term deal with the shoewear retailer Kurt Geiger to operate Manolo Blahnik boutiques.

In 2000, Blahnik, together with Neiman Marcus, launched the first commercial virtual reality online showroom featuring 3D models of his shoes. The entire collection was sold out online within three weeks.

Blahnik was elevated to the International Best Dressed List Hall of Fame in 1987. In 2007, Blahnik was appointed as an honorary Commander of the Order of the British Empire for his service to the British fashion industry.

Blahnik currently resides in Bath, England, and was awarded an honorary degree from Bath Spa University in July 2012.

== Early development ==
One of Blahnik's greatest inspirations was his mother. She studied fashion magazines and interpreted the latest fashion trends on her clothing. Blahnik and his family often travelled to Paris and Madrid to order clothes. His mother was always dissatisfied with the shoes from their hometown so she made her own. She learned the rudiments of her craft from a local Canary Island cobbler and, as a boy, Blahnik loved to watch his mother when she made beautiful shoes. He has inherited his mother's love for brocade and satin fabrics and recounted how, as a boy, he found a trunk filled with shoes by the famous Russian, Pierre Yantorny, all made from silks, antique lace and brocades trimmed with delicate buckles. All were light, elegant and feminine, attributes Blahnik later brought to his own designs.

When Blahnik was attending university he lived with his aunt and uncle. Meanwhile, his aunt deeply influenced his fashion sense and style. He refined his tastes and learned to appreciate the beauty of luxury, art, and happiness and beauty. Blahnik recalled that, according to his aunt, "happiness was having the single most elegant handbag ever made, in every color available."

== Shoes ==
Blahnik never studied shoemaking formally. He learned the skills by visiting shoe factories and talking to pattern cutters, technicians, and machine operators. At first, he designed men's footwear, but he immediately found that men's shoe design limited his imagination and lacked the element of fashion so he focused on women's shoes. Blahnik's career traces how he drew inspiration from architecture, art and films. When mainstream shoe styles were still dominated by clunky platforms in the 1970s, he revived the sleek stiletto heel. Also, he dislikes wedges and believes in the power of heels and the sex appeal they convey.

== Filmography ==
Blahnik is the subject of the 2017 biopic film: Manolo: The Boy Who Made Shoes for Lizards, written and directed by Michael Roberts. Manolo Blahnik was portrayed by River Hawkins.

== Awards and honours ==
Council of Fashion Designers of America (CFDA)

- 1987: Special Award
- 1990: Accessory Designer of the Year
- 1997: The Stiletto

British Fashion Council

- 1999: Accessory Designer of the Year
- 1990: Accessory Designer of the Year

Honors

- 1998: Shoe Designer of the Year from Footwear News
- 2003: Shoe Designer of the Year from Footwear News
- 2007 Honorary CBE from HM Queen Elizabeth II
- 2011 The SCAD (Savannah College of Art and Design) Andre Leon Talley Lifetime Achievement Award.
- 2011 A Lifetime Achievement Award from Footwear News.
- 2016 Honorary doctorate of the Universidad de La Laguna.
- 2017 Ranked #25 best dressed man alive by Esquire magazine
- 2018: Luxury Legend Award by Walpole British Luxury Awards on 19 November
