= Panagiotis Angelopoulos =

Greek businessman

Panagiotis Angelopoulos Παναγιώτης Αγγελόπουλος
- Born: 21 January 1973 (age 53); Athens, Greece
- Occupations: Executive vice chair of Arcadia Shipmanagement Co. Ltd. co-οwner of Olympiacos B.C.

Panagiotis Angelopoulos (alternate spellings: Panayiotis, Aggelopoulos) (Greek: Παναγιώτης Αγγελόπουλος) is a Greek businessman who is involved in oil shipping and steel. He is the co-owner of the men's professional Greek Basket League and EuroLeague club basketball team Olympiacos, along with his brother, Giorgos Angelopoulos.

== Angelopoulos family ==
Angelopoulos is the son of the Greek oil shipping and steel magnate, Constantine Angelopoulos, and the grandson of the late Greek industrialist, Panagiotis Angelopoulos (1909–2001). He is also the nephew of Theodore Angelopoulos. He is the brother of Giorgos Angelopoulos.

== Businesses ==
Angelopoulos, along with his brother Giorgos, is the co-owner of Arcadia Shipmanagement.

== Olympiacos B.C. ==
Panagiotis Angelopoulos, and his brother, Giorgos, won the EuroLeague Club Executive of the Year Award in the year 2012, after their professional basketball club, Olympiacos, won the EuroLeague 2011–12 season's championship.
