= Hoechst Schering AgrEvo GmbH =

Hoechst Schering AgrEvo GmbH was a Düsseldorf-based limited liability company owned by Hoechst AG and Schering AG that only existed as an independent company for five years, from 1994 to 1999.

It was established in 1994, when two German producers of chemicals and pharmaceuticals, Hoechst and Schering, merged their crop protection divisions into a new joint venture to benefit from economies of scale in marketing and research and development. In 1999, AgrEvo’s majority shareholder, Hoechst, merged with the French pharmaceutical and chemical company Rhône-Poulenc to become Aventis, with AgrEvo and Rhône-Poulenc's agrochemicals division combined into Aventis CropScience. In 2002, Bayer AG acquired Aventis CropScience and combined it with their agrochemicals division (Bayer Pflanzenschutz or "Crop Protection") to form Bayer CropScience.

== Products ==
- Unim Plus, a weedicide for vegetables, tea, and cotton
- Puma, a super herbicide for wheat
