= Eurocup 2013–14 Regular Season Group H =

Standings and Results for Group H of the Regular Season phase of the 2013–14 Eurocup basketball tournament.

== Standings ==
	Team	Pld	W	L	PF	PA	Diff	Tie-break
1.	(Turkey) Beşiktaş Integral Forex	10	7	3	717	690	+27	
2.	(Greece) Panionios	10	6	4	768	755	+13	
3.	(Serbia) Radnički Kragujevac	10	5	5	824	824	0	1–1 (+1)
4.	(Finland) Bisons Loimaa	10	5	5	750	769	–19	1–1 (–1)
5.	(Lithuania) Neptūnas Klaipėda	10	4	6	814	807	+7	
6.	(Russia) BC Spartak Saint Petersburg	10	3	7	733	761	–28	

Source: Euroleague Basketball

== Fixtures and results ==
=== Game 1 ===
16 October 2013
18:00 CET

Boxscore

Panionios (Greece)	77–72	(Serbia) Radnički Kragujevac
Scoring by quarter: 12–15, 16–10, 16–23, 33–24
Pts: McCollum 27; Rebs: Symtsak 7 Asts: Athanasoulas, Duvnjak 4		Pts: Mlađan 16; Rebs: Yarou 16; Asts: Marinović 8

Helliniko Olympic Arena, Helliniko
Attendance: 800
Referees: Borys Ryzhyk (UKR), Eddie Viator (FRA), Piotr Pustusiak (POL)

16 October 2013
19:00 CET

Boxscore

Beşiktaş Integral Forex (Turkey)	58–62	(Russia) BC Spartak Saint Petersburg
Scoring by quarter: 10–20, 17–9, 11–10, 20–23
Pts: Lofton 14; Rebs: Perkins 7 Asts: Perkins 4		Pts: McGrath 16; Rebs: Surovtsev, Yakovenko 5 Asts: McGrath

BJK Akatlar Arena, Istanbul
Attendance: 1,950
Referees: Guerrino Cerebuch (ITA), Igor Dragojevic (MNE), Tomislav Vovk (CRO)

16 October 2013
19:00 CET

Boxscore

Bisons Loimaa (Finland)	63–62	(Lithuania) Neptūnas Klaipėda
Scoring by quarter: 15–16, 15–9, 17–19, 16–18
Pts: Robinson, Keys 14; Rebs: Kotti 9 Asts: Keys, Nikkarinen 4		Pts: Vasylius 14; Rebs: Smith 7 Asts: Eitutavicius 3

Helsinki Ice Hall, Helsinki
Attendance: 6,142
Referees: Renaud Geller (BEL), Alexey Davydov (RUS), Semen Ovinov (RUS)

=== Game 2 ===
23 October 2013
17:00 CET

Boxscore

BC Spartak Saint Petersburg (Russia)	68–69	(Greece) Panionios
Scoring by quarter: 13–22, 20–13, 21–13, 14–21
Pts: Homan 16; Rebs: Homan 10; Asts: McGrath 7		Pts: Carter 23; Rebs: three players 3 Asts: Athanasoulas, Batis 4

Triumph Sports Palace, Lyubertsy
Attendance: 400
Referees: Sasa Pukl (SLO), Moritz Reiter (GER), Gintaras Vitkauskas (LTU)

23 October 2013
18:00 CET

Boxscore

Neptūnas Klaipėda (Lithuania)	70–72	(Turkey) Beşiktaş Integral Forex
Scoring by quarter: 16–22, 21–23, 18–14, 15–13
Pts: Mažeika 17; Rebs: Eitutavičius 6 Asts: Eitutavičius 7		Pts: Buckman 23; Rebs: Buckman 12; Asts: Güler 6

Švyturys Arena, Klaipėda
Attendance: 4,500
Referees: Olegs Latisevs (LAT), Apostolos Kalpakas (SWE), Ilya Putenko (RUS)

23 October 2013
18:00 CET

Boxscore

Radnički Kragujevac (Serbia)	92–89	(Finland) Bisons Loimaa
Scoring by quarter: 27–24, 20–15, 20–29, 25–21
Pts: Seeley 23; Rebs: Yarou 17; Asts: Marinović 10		Pts: Robinson 24; Rebs: Three players 4 Asts: Koivisto 6

Jezero Hall, Kragujevac
Attendance: 2,000
Referees: Gianluca Mattioli (ITA), Miroslav Tomov (BUL), David Romano (ISR)

=== Game 3 ===
29 October 2013
18:00 CET

Boxscore

Radnički Kragujevac (Serbia)	97–80	(Russia) BC Spartak Saint Petersburg
Scoring by quarter: 26–15, 19–18, 21–23, 31–24
Pts: Lešić 23; Rebs: Yarou 10; Asts: Marinović 8		Pts: Burtt 24; Rebs: Koscheev 6 Asts: McGrath 6

Jezero Hall, Kragujevac
Attendance: 2,550
Referees: Jakub Zamojski (POL), Gentian Cici (ALB), Ersan Kartal (TUR)

30 October 2013
18:00 CET

Boxscore

Bisons Loimaa (Finland)	60–61	(Turkey) Beşiktaş Integral Forex
Scoring by quarter: 18–22, 8–20, 19–14, 15–5
Pts: Robinson, Keys 19; Rebs: Hawkins 7 Asts: Keys 4		Pts: Lofton 20; Rebs: Buckman 7 Asts: Perkins 4

Helsinki Ice Hall, Helsinki
Attendance: 6,246
Referees: Sergiy Zashchuk (UKR), Arnis Ozols (TUR), Oskars Lucis (LAT)

30 October 2013
20:00 CET

Boxscore

Panionios (Greece)	86–91	(Lithuania) Neptūnas Klaipėda
Scoring by quarter: 18–21, 25–23, 29–21, 14–26
Pts: Duvnjak 18; Rebs: Milbourne 6 Asts: Duvnjak 5		Pts: Vasylius 23; Rebs: Šarakauskas 12; Asts: Mažeika 5

Helliniko Olympic Arena, Helliniko
Attendance: 1,200
Referees: Juan Carlos Arteaga (ESP), Oscar Perea (ESP), Zdravko Rutesic (MNE)

=== Game 4 ===
6 November 2013
18:00 CET

Boxscore

Neptūnas Klaipėda (Lithuania)	97–101	(Serbia) Radnički Kragujevac
Scoring by quarter: 22–27, 29–22, 20–28, 26–24
Pts: Vasylius 25; Rebs: Ulanovas, Vasylius 6 Asts: Vasylius 5		Pts: Yarou 20; Rebs: Yarou 13; Asts: Jović 10

Švyturys Arena, Klaipėda
Attendance: 4000
Referees: Vicente Bulto (ESP), Robert Vyklicky (CZE), Oskars Lucis (LAT)

6 November 2013
19:00 CET

Boxscore

Bisons Loimaa (Finland)	74–73	(Russia) BC Spartak Saint Petersburg
Scoring by quarter: 27–15, 5–19, 15–14, 27–25
Pts: Kotti 22; Rebs: Robinson 10; Asts: Nikkarinen 4		Pts: Korolev 19; Rebs: Homan 9 Asts: Burtt 9

Helsinki Ice Hall, Helsinki
Attendance: 2,852
Referees: Anastasios Piloidis (GRE), Marko Juras (SRB), Clements Fritz (GER)

6 November 2013
19:00 CET

Boxscore

Beşiktaş Integral Forex (Turkey)	71–57	(Greece) Panionios
Scoring by quarter: 21–15, 15–16, 12–16, 23–10
Pts: Perkins 20; Rebs: Iverson 9 Asts: Perkins 3		Pts: McCollum 22; Rebs: Saloustros 8 Asts: Carter, Kiritsis 3

BJK Akatlar Arena, Istanbul
Attendance: 919
Referees: Sreten Radovic (SRB), Jasmina Juras (SRB), Saverio Lanzarini (ITA)

=== Game 5 ===
13 November 2013
17:00 CET

Boxscore

BC Spartak Saint Petersburg (Russia)	88–75	(Lithuania) Neptūnas Klaipėda
Scoring by quarter: 18–13, 26–19, 16–20, 28–23
Pts: Burtt 21; Rebs: Homan 9 Asts: Burtt 9		Pts: Šarakauskas 15; Rebs: Šarakauskas 5 Asts: Runkauskas 4

Spartak Arena, Saint Petersburg
Attendance: 700
Referees: Andrej Lovsin (SLO), Miroslav Tomov (BUL), Aleksandar Miloevic (SRB)

13 November 2013
18:00 CET

Boxscore

Panionios (Greece)	74–62	(Finland) Bisons Loimaa
Scoring by quarter: 15–20, 23–12, 18–13, 18–17
Pts: Langford 19; Rebs: Milbourne 7 Asts: McCollum 4		Pts: Kotti, Williamson 13; Rebs: Williamson 7 Asts: Nikkarinen 7

Helliniko Olympic Arena, Helliniko
Attendance: 800
Referees: Tolga Sahin (TUR), Carmelo Paternico (ITA), Sergio Silva (POR)

13 November 2013
18:00 CET

Boxscore

Radnički Kragujevac (Serbia)	70–77	(Turkey) Beşiktaş Integral Forex
Scoring by quarter: 21–24, 13–18, 14–19, 22–16
Pts: Mlađan 17; Rebs: Yarou 8 Asts: Marinović 4		Pts: Buckman 19; Rebs: Iverson 12; Asts: Perkins 6

Jezero Hall, Kragujevac
Attendance: 3,500
Referees: Emilio Perez Pizarro (ESP), Roberto Chiari (ITA), Seffi Shemmesh (ISR)

=== Game 6 ===
20 November 2013
17:00 CET

Boxscore

BC Spartak Saint Petersburg (Russia)	61–64	(Turkey) Beşiktaş Integral Forex
Scoring by quarter: 16–14, 14–16, 13–9, 18–25
Pts: Burtt 20; Rebs: Homan 8 Asts: McGrath 6		Pts: Lofton 20; Rebs: Buckman 10; Asts: Yağmur 4

Spartak Arena, Saint Petersburg
Attendance: 700
Referees: Luis Lopes (POR), Petar Obradovic (BIH), Jurgis Laurinavicius (LAT)

20 November 2013
18:00 CET

Boxscore

Neptūnas Klaipėda (Lithuania)	85–72	(Finland) Bisons Loimaa
Scoring by quarter: 22–13, 11–21, 32–18, 20–20
Pts: Mažeika, Runkauskas 16; Rebs: Šarakauskas 10; Asts: Three players 4		Pts: Three players 15; Rebs: Kotti 9 Asts: Nikkarinen 7

Švyturys Arena, Klaipėda
Attendance: 4,500
Referees: Nicola Maestre (FRA),

20 November 2013
18:00 CET

Boxscore

Radnički Kragujevac (Serbia)	84–77	(Greece) Panionios
Scoring by quarter: 20–17, 21–18, 27–15, 16–27
Pts: Marinović 20; Rebs: Yarou 10; Asts: Marinović 4		Pts: McCollum 26; Rebs: McCollum 6 Asts: Carter 4

Jezero Hall, Kragujevac
Attendance: 2,100
Referees: Marcin Kowalski (POL), Francisco Arana (ESP), Omer Esteron (ISR)

=== Game 7 ===
27 November 2013
17:00 CET

Boxscore

Panionios (Greece)	76–69	(Russia) BC Spartak Saint Petersburg
Scoring by quarter: 22–11, 17–16, 12–24, 25–18
Pts: McCollum 24; Rebs: Saloustros 9 Asts: McCollum 4		Pts: Burtt 26; Rebs: Homan, Koshcheev 8 Asts: McGrath 6

Helliniko Olympic Arena, Helliniko
Attendance: 500
Referees: Luigi Lamonica (ITA), Saso Petek (SLO), Alexandru Olaru (ROM)

27 November 2013
18:30 CET

Boxscore

Beşiktaş Integral Forex (Turkey)	74–83	(Lithuania) Neptūnas Klaipėda
Scoring by quarter: 16–21, 18–19, 14–19, 26–24
Pts: Gaines 21; Rebs: Iverson 7 Asts: Yağmur 4		Pts: Mažeika 17; Rebs: Mažeika, Šarakauskas 6 Asts: Ulanovas 5

BJK Akatlar Arena, Istanbul
Attendance: 1,100
Referees: Andrej Jersan (SLO), Igor Dragojevic (MNE), Milos Koljensic (MNE)

27 November 2013
19:00 CET

Boxscore

Bisons Loimaa (Finland)	75–73	(Serbia) Radnički Kragujevac
Scoring by quarter: 21–14, 21–17, 14–20, 19–22
Pts: Williamson 28; Rebs: Williamson 8 Asts: Nikkarinen, Kotti 4		Pts: Yarou 27; Rebs: Yarou 18; Asts: Marinović 6

Helsinki Ice Hall, Helsinki
Attendance: 2,457
Referees: Grzegorz Ziemblicki (POL), Aare Halliko (EST), Nick Van den Broeck (BEL)

=== Game 8 ===
4 December 2013
17:00 CET

Boxscore

BC Spartak Saint Petersburg (Russia)	81–68	(Serbia) Radnički Kragujevac
Scoring by quarter: 16–16, 15–20, 27-14, 23–18
Pts: Korolev 20; Rebs: Homan 13; Asts: Burtt, McGrath 7		Pts: Marinović, Kalinić, Bircevic 14; Rebs: Kalinić 7 Asts: Marinović 11

Spartak Arena, Saint Petersburg
Attendance: 600
Referees: Emin Mogulkoc (TUR), Oskars Lucis (LAT), Ingus Baumanis (LAT)

4 December 2013
18:00 CET

Boxscore

Neptūnas Klaipėda (Lithuania)	78–86	(Greece) Panionios
Scoring by quarter: 17–25, 16–16, 22–20, 23–25
Pts: Sinica 19; Rebs: Galdikas, Smith 4 Asts: Mažeika 4		Pts: Carter 29; Rebs: Duvnjak, McCollum 5 Asts: McCollum 8

Švyturys Arena, Klaipėda
Attendance: 3,500
Referees: Jose Ramon Garcia Ortiz (ESP), Boris Shulga (UKR), Arnis Ozols (LAT)

4 December 2013
19:00 CET

Boxscore

Beşiktaş Integral Forex (Turkey)	83–74	(Finland) Bisons Loimaa
Scoring by quarter: 23-14, 18–27, 20–13, 22–20
Pts: Mehmet Yağmur 16; Rebs: Buckman 11; Asts: Mehmet Yağmur 6		Pts: Robinson 17; Rebs: Kotti, Williamson 5 Asts: Keys, Koivisto 4

BJK Akatlar Arena, Istanbul
Attendance: 950
Referees: Sinisa Herceg (CRO), Anastasios Piloidis (GRE), Uros Obrknezevic (SRB)

=== Game 9 ===
11 December 2013
17:00 CET

Boxscore

BC Spartak Saint Petersburg (Russia)	77–88	(Finland) Bisons Loimaa
Scoring by quarter: 20–20, 25–23, 19–19, 13–26
Pts: Homan 23; Rebs: Homan; Asts: Burtt 7		Pts: Williamson 24; Rebs: Williamson 9 Asts: Keys 9

Triumph Sports Palace, Lyubertsy
Attendance: 500
Referees: Seffi Shemmesh (ISR), Zdravko Rutesic (MNE), Tomislav Hordov (CRO)

11 December 2013
16:00 CET

Boxscore

Panionios (Greece)	77–67	(Turkey) Beşiktaş Integral Forex
Scoring by quarter: 23–14, 15–18, 14–19, 25–16
Pts: McCollum 17; Rebs: Carter 6 Asts: McCollum 4		Pts: Iverson, Lofton 13; Rebs: Iverson 8 Asts: Yağmur 4

Helliniko Olympic Arena, Helliniko
Attendance: 800
Referees: Dani Hierrenzuelo (ESP), Jakub Zamojski (POL), Semen Ovinov (RUS)

11 December 2013
18:00 CET

Boxscore

Radnički Kragujevac (Serbia)	91–81	(Lithuania) Neptūnas Klaipėda
Scoring by quarter: 31–20, 22–16, 19–17, 19–28
Pts: Lešić 20; Rebs: Kalinić, Lešić 8 Asts: Marinović 15		Pts: Ulanovas 17; Rebs: Galdikas 7 Asts: Mažeika 5

Jezero Hall, Kragujevac
Attendance: 2,150
Referees: Robert Lottermoser (GER), Sergiy Chebyshev (UKR), Carlos Peruga (ESP)

=== Game 10 ===
18 December 2013
18:00 CET

Boxscore

Neptūnas Klaipėda (Lithuania)	92–74	(Russia) BC Spartak Saint Petersburg
Scoring by quarter: 25–14, 23–19, 17–19, 27–22
Pts: Mažeika 33; Rebs: Ulanovas 8 Asts: Eitutavičius 5		Pts: Burtt 21; Rebs: Korolev 6 Asts: Burtt 6

Švyturys Arena, Klaipėda
Attendance: 3,000
Referees: Recep Ankarali (TUR), Roberto Chiari (ITA), Oscar Perea (ESP)

18 December 2013
19:00 CET

Boxscore

Bisons Loimaa (Finland)	93–89 (OT)	(Greece) Panionios
Scoring by quarter: 19–16, 18–18, 30–24, 13–22, Overtime: 13–9
Pts: Robinson 28; Rebs: Robinson 12; Asts: Nikkarinen 5		Pts: McCollum 23; Rebs: Saloustros 8 Asts: three players 3

Helsinki Ice Hall, Helsinki
Attendance: 2,142
Referees: Marius Ciulin (ROM), Sergiy Chebyshev (UKR), Sergio Silva (POR)

18 December 2013
19:00 CET

Boxscore

Beşiktaş Integral Forex (Turkey)	90–76	(Serbia) Radnički Kragujevac
Scoring by quarter: 30–22, 14–20, 20–23, 26–11
Pts: Lofton 20; Rebs: Iverson 9 Asts: Gaines, Güler 6		Pts: Birčević 21; Rebs: Jevtović, Seeley 5 Asts: Marinović 9

BJK Akatlar Arena, Istanbul
Attendance: 1,021
Referees: Luigi Lamonica (ITA), Tomasz Trawicki (POL), Ilya Putenko (RUS)
