= 2009–10 Euroleague Regular Season Group C =

Standings and Results for Group C of the regular season phase of the 2009–10 Euroleague basketball tournament.

== Standings ==
Key to colors
Top four places in each group advance to Top 16
Eliminated

	Team	Pld	W	L	PF	PA	Diff	Tie-break
1.	(Russia) CSKA Moscow	10	8	2	730	700	+30	
2.	(Spain) Caja Laboral Baskonia	10	7	3	779	735	+46	
3.	(Israel) Maccabi Tel Aviv	10	6	4	794	737	+57	
4.	(Greece) Maroussi Athens	10	4	6	744	764	−20	1–1 +1
5.	(Italy) Lottomatica Roma	10	4	6	713	737	−24	1–1 –1
6.	(Slovenia) Union Olimpija Ljubljana	10	1	9	677	764	−87	

== Fixtures and results ==
All times given below are in Central European Time.

Unless otherwise indicated, all attendance totals are from the corresponding match report posted on the official Euroleague site and included with each game summary.

=== Game 1 ===
15 October 2009
21:15

Report

Maccabi Tel Aviv (Israel)	85–65	(Slovenia) Union Olimpija Ljubljana
Scoring by quarter: 20-10, 17-15, 18-20, 30-20
Pts: Anderson 25; Rebs: Fischer 7 Asts: Wisniewski, Eidson 4		Pts: Walsh 18; Rebs: Golubović 8 Asts: Ožbolt 3

Nokia Arena
Attendance: 11,000
Referees: Spiros Gontas (GRE), Guerrino Cerebuch (ITA), Anna Cardús (ESP)

21 October 2009
16:45

Report

Maroussi Athens (Greece)	65–66	(Russia) CSKA Moscow
Scoring by quarter: 12-18, 22-14, 14-17, 17-17
Pts: Kaimakoglou 15; Rebs: Mavroeidis 9 Asts: Gordon 4		Pts: Langdon 18; Rebs: Khryapa 9 Asts: Khryapa 4

Olympic Indoor Hall
Attendance: 1,650
Referees: Schmuel Bachas (ISR), Antonio Conde (ESP), Damir Javor (SLO)

22 October 2009
20:30

Report

Lottomatica Roma (Italy)	77–65	(Spain) Caja Laboral Baskonia
Scoring by quarter: 17-15, 20-17, 27-11, 13-22
Pts: Jaaber, Winston 18; Rebs: Gigli 9 Asts: Jaaber 6		Pts: Teletović, Splitter 17; Rebs: San Emeterio 10; Asts: Splitter, Huertas 4

Palalottomatica
Attendance: 3,674
Referees: Christos Christodoulou (GRE), Marek Cmikiewicz (POL), Saša Maričić (SRB)

=== Game 2 ===
28 October 2009
18:15

Report

CSKA Moscow (Russia)	69–74	(Italy) Lottomatica Roma
Scoring by quarter: 22-26, 19-13, 12-19, 16-16
Pts: Planinić 22; Rebs: Planinić 7 Asts: Khryapa 6		Pts: Hutson 15; Rebs: Jaaber, Touré, Crosariol 5 Asts: Winston 5

CSKA Universal Sports Hall
Attendance: 2,500
Referees: Grzegorz Ziemblicki (POL), Eddie Viator (FRA), Oliver Krause (GER)

29 October 2009
20:30

Report

Union Olimpija Ljubljana (Slovenia)	75–81	(Greece) Maroussi Athens
Scoring by quarter: 17-18, 16-15, 19-20, 23-28
Pts: Walsh 32; Rebs: Ožbolt 6 Asts: Bečirovič 6		Pts: Mavroeidis 18; Rebs: Batis, Homan 5 Asts: Lukas 4

Hala Tivoli
Attendance: 5,500
Referees: Borys Ryzhyk (UKR), Roberto Chiari (ITA), Sergey Mikhaylov (RUS)

29 October 2009
20:30

Report

Caja Laboral Baskonia (Spain)	86–81	(Israel) Maccabi Tel Aviv
Scoring by quarter: 25-25, 30-19, 14-22, 17-15
Pts: Splitter 26; Rebs: Eliyahu, Splitter 7 Asts: Ribas, Huertas 3		Pts: Lampe 18; Rebs: Lasme, Lampe 7 Asts: Eidson 4

Fernando Buesa Arena
Attendance: 9,600
Referees: Romualdas Brazauskas (LTU), Jakub Zamojski (POL), Robert Vyklicky (CZE)

=== Game 3 ===
4 November 2009
18:00

Report

Maroussi Athens (Greece)	71–83	(Italy) Lottomatica Roma
Scoring by quarter: 17-27, 24-20, 18-19, 12-17
Pts: Lukas 15; Rebs: Mavroeidis 6 Asts: Keys 4		Pts: Winston 16; Rebs: Minard 8 Asts: Jaaber 7

Olympic Indoor Hall
Attendance: 1,700
Referees: Juan Carlos Mitjana (ESP), Robert Vyklicky (CZE), Jasmina Tatic (SRB)

5 November 2009
20:00

Report

Maccabi Tel Aviv (Israel)	71–54	(Russia) CSKA Moscow
Scoring by quarter: 19-7, 21-18, 16-15, 15-14
Pts: Eidson 16; Rebs: Perkins, Fischer 7 Asts: Perkins 6		Pts: Šiškauskas 12; Rebs: Khryapa 8 Asts: Langdon 4

Nokia Arena
Attendance: 11,000
Referees: Luigi Lamonica(ITA), Milivoje Jovčić (SRB), Panagiotis Anastopoulos (GRE)

5 November 2009
20:30

Report

Union Olimpija Ljubljana (Slovenia)	76–82	(Spain) Caja Laboral Baskonia
Scoring by quarter: 20-26, 12-17, 20-13, 24-26
Pts: Walsh 27; Rebs: Bavčić 7 Asts: Bečirovič, Slokar 2		Pts: Huertas 21; Rebs: Splitter 7 Asts: fourth with 2

Hala Tivoli
Attendance: 5,000
Referees: Volodymr Drabikovsky (UKR), Paolo Taurino (ITA), Elias Koromilas (GRE)

=== Game 4 ===
11 November 2009
18:00

Report

Maroussi Athens (Greece)	86–103	(Spain) Caja Laboral Baskonia
Scoring by quarter: 16-27, 30-25, 19-25, 21-26
Pts: Kaimakoglou 23; Rebs: Homan 8 Asts: Kaimakoglou 5		Pts: English 17; Rebs: Micov 6 Asts: English 5

Olympic Indoor Hall
Attendance: 2,050
Referees: Guerrino Cerebuch (ITA), Eddie Viator (FRA), Olegs Latisevs (LAT)

11 November 2009
18:15

Report

CSKA Moscow (Russia)	79–69	(Slovenia) Union Olimpija Ljubljana
Scoring by quarter: 30-15, 14-18, 20-21, 15-15
Pts: Langdon 19; Rebs: Khryapa 8 Asts: Khryapa 8		Pts: Walsh 21; Rebs: Bavčić, Vidmar, Walsh 4 Asts: Bečirovič 3

CSKA Universal Sports Hall
Attendance: 2,500
Referees: Ilija Belošević (SRB), Sergiy Zashchuck (UKR), Apostolos Kalpakas (SWE)

12 November 2009
20:30

Report

Lottomatica Roma (Italy)	90–92; OT (OT)	(Israel) Maccabi Tel Aviv
Scoring by quarter: 17-17, 16-18, 26-16, 14-22, Overtime: 17-19
Pts: Winston 21; Rebs: Jaaber, Crosariol 7 Asts: Jaaber, Crosariol, Winston 2		Pts: Anderson 27; Rebs: Eidson 8 Asts: Wisniewski 6

Palalottomatica
Attendance: 5,745
Referees: Juan Carlos Arteaga (ESP), Sradan Dozai (CRO), Milija Vojinovic (SRB)

=== Game 5 ===
25 November 2009
20:30

Report

Union Olimpija Ljubljana (Slovenia)	87–70	(Italy) Lottomatica Roma
Scoring by quarter: 23-21, 25-7, 16-20, 23-22
Pts: Bečirovič 24; Rebs: Vidmar 6 Asts: Bečirovič 6		Pts: Winston 18; Rebs: Touré, Crosariol, Minard 4 Asts: 5 players with 1

Hala Tivoli
Attendance: 3,000
Referees: José Ramón García Ortiz (ESP), Fernando Rocha (POR), Seffi Shemmesh (ISR)

26 November 2009
20:00

Report

Maccabi Tel Aviv (Israel)	75–67	(Greece) Maroussi Athens
Scoring by quarter: 15-15, 26-25, 20-14, 14-13
Pts: Wisniewski 20; Rebs: Lampe 9 Asts: Wisniewski 4		Pts: Keys 14; Rebs: Mavroeidis 7 Asts: Keys, Lukas 4

Nokia Arena
Attendance: 11,500
Referees: Volodymr Drabikovsky (UKR), Saša Maričić (SRB), Oskars Lucis (LAT)

26 November 2009
20:30

Report

Caja Laboral Baskonia (Spain)	67–71	(Russia) CSKA Moscow
Scoring by quarter: 12-24, 23-19, 18-8, 14-20
Pts: English 14; Rebs: Splitter 8 Asts: San Emeterio, Splitter 5		Pts: Šiškauskas 24; Rebs: Kaun 8 Asts: Khryapa 5

Fernando Buesa Arena
Attendance: 9,650
Referees: Lazaros Voreadis (GRE), Robert Lottermoser (GER), David Chambon (FRA)

=== Game 6 ===
2 December 2009
18:15

Report

CSKA Moscow (Russia)	78–65	(Greece) Maroussi Athens
Scoring by quarter: 15-13, 20-17, 23-12, 20-23
Pts: Holden 16; Rebs: Khryapa 6 Asts: Šiškauskas 3		Pts: Mavroeidis 11; Rebs: Homan 6 Asts: Batis 3

CSKA Universal Sports Hall
Attendance: 2,500
Referees: Saša Pukl (SLO), Carmelo Paternico (ITA), Marcin Kowalski (POL)

2 December 2009
20:30

Report

Caja Laboral Baskonia (Spain)	67–60	(Italy) Lottomatica Roma
Scoring by quarter: 17–11, 16–17, 20–10, 14–22
Pts: Teletović 17; Rebs: Splitter 8 Asts: San Emeterio, Singletary, Splitter 3		Pts: Minard 15; Rebs: Winston 6 Asts: Minard, Vitali, Winston 3

Fernando Buesa Arena
Attendance: 9,280
Referees: Shmuel Bachar (ISR), Matej Boltauzer (SVN), Marko Juras (SRB)

3 December 2009
20:30

Report

Union Olimpija Ljubljana (Slovenia)	65–82	(Israel) Maccabi Tel Aviv
Scoring by quarter: 20-20, 16-24, 19-14, 10-24
Pts: Golubović, Ožbolt 14; Rebs: Golubović 13; Asts: Đorđević, Walsh 3		Pts: Anderson 15; Rebs: Perkins, Eidson 9 Asts: Eidson 6

Hala Tivoli
Attendance: 5,500
Referees: Dani Hierrezuelo (ESP), Emilio Pérez Pizarro (ESP), Boris Shulga (UKR)

=== Game 7 ===
9 December 2009
19:45

Report

Maroussi Athens (Greece)	74–62	(Slovenia) Union Olimpija Ljubljana
Scoring by quarter: 28-14, 14-22, 10-11, 22-15
Pts: Homan 15; Rebs: Mavroeidis 9 Asts: Lucas 4		Pts: Walsh 12; Rebs: Aleksandrov 6 Asts: Bečirovič, Ožbolt 3

Athens Olympic Sports Complex
Attendance: 500
Referees: Fabio Facchini (ITA), Milija Vojinovic (SRB), Zdravko Rutešić (MNE)

10 December 2009
20:00

Report

Maccabi Tel Aviv (Israel)	82–91	(Spain) Caja Laboral Baskonia
Scoring by quarter: 18–20, 16–23, 23–24, 25–24
Pts: Eidson 19; Rebs: Lasme 9 Asts: Fischer 4		Pts: Teletović 28; Rebs: Eliyahu, Singletary, Teletović 6 Asts: Ribas 7

Nokia Arena
Attendance: 11,500
Referees: Romualdas Brazkauskas (LTU), Sergey Mikhaylov (RUS), Fernando Rocha (PRT)

10 December 2009
20:30

Report

Lottomatica Roma (Italy)	57–72	(Russia) CSKA Moscow
Scoring by quarter: 16–24, 6–17, 16–22, 19–9
Pts: Hutson 18; Rebs: Touré 6 Asts: Jaaber, Minard 2		Pts: Kaun, Langdon 13; Rebs: Kaun 10; Asts: 6 players with 2

Palalottomatica
Attendance: 4,453
Referees: Juan Carlos Mitjana (ESP), Spiros Gontas (GRC), Elias Koromilas (GRC)

=== Game 8 ===
16 December 2009
20:30

Report

Caja Laboral Baskonia (Spain)	62–53	(Slovenia) Union Olimpija Ljubljana
Scoring by quarter: 18-13, 18-8, 12-19, 14-13
Pts: Splitter 15; Rebs: Splitter 6 Asts: Ribas, Huertas, Eliyahu 4		Pts: Bečirovič 14; Rebs: Bavčić, Golubović, Walsh 5 Asts: Bečirovič 2

Fernando Buesa Arena
Attendance: 8,700
Referees: Guerrino Cerebuch (ITA), Nicolas Maestre (FRA), Renaud Geller (BEL)

16 December 2009
20:30

Report

Lottomatica Roma (Italy)	74–87	(Greece) Maroussi Athens
Scoring by quarter: 17-28, 22-23, 18-14, 17-22
Pts: Winston 26; Rebs: Crosariol 7 Asts: Winston 3		Pts: Nađfeji 22; Rebs: Keys, Homan, Lukas 4 Asts: Milošević 5

Palalottomatica
Attendance: 3,612
Referees: Dubravko Muhvic (CRO), Recep Ankarali (TUR), Anna Cardus (ESP)

17 December 2009
18:15

Report

CSKA Moscow (Russia)	77–72	(Israel) Maccabi Tel Aviv
Scoring by quarter: 28-11, 17-23, 13-22, 19-16
Pts: Kaun 21; Rebs: Šiškauskas 6 Asts: Khryapa 8		Pts: Eidson 17; Rebs: Wisniewski 9 Asts: Wisniewski, Perkins 3

CSKA Universal Sports Hall
Attendance: 4,600
Referees: José Martín (ESP), Leonidas Spiridonos (GRE), Gianpaolo Cicoria (ITA)

=== Game 9 ===
6 January 2010
20:30

Report

Caja Laboral Baskonia (Spain)	73–65	(Greece) Maroussi Athens
Scoring by quarter: 16-19, 15-13, 27-12, 15-21
Pts: Teletović, San Emeterio 15; Rebs: Barać 9 Asts: Huertas 7		Pts: Keys, Mavroeidis 12; Rebs: Nađfeji 7 Asts: Milošević 5

Fernando Buesa Arena
Attendance: 9,100
Referees: Volodymr Drabikovsky(UKR), Roman Kolar (SLO), Radomir Vojinovic(MNE)

7 January 2010
20:00

Report

Maccabi Tel Aviv (Israel)	79–59	(Italy) Lottomatica Roma
Scoring by quarter: 22-20, 13-15, 21-13, 23-11
Pts: Eidson 23; Rebs: Fischer 7 Asts: Wisniewski 5		Pts: Minard 14; Rebs: Hutson 9 Asts: Minard 3

Nokia Arena
Attendance: 11,500
Referees: Lazaros Voreadis (GRE), Saša Pukl (SLO), Zdravko Rutešić (MNE)

7 January 2010
20:30

Report

Union Olimpija Ljubljana (Slovenia)	77–80 (OT)	(Russia) CSKA Moscow
Scoring by quarter: 15-18, 13-14, 21-6, 13-24, Overtime: 15-18
Pts: Walsh 18; Rebs: Vidmar, Walsh 7 Asts: Bečirovič 4		Pts: Langdon 20; Rebs: Khryapa 14; Asts: Holden 3

Hala Tivoli
Attendance: 5,000
Referees: Christos Christodoulou (GRE), Antonio Conde (ESP), Miguel Angel Perez Niz (ESP)

=== Game 10 ===
14 January 2010
19:00

Report

Maroussi Athens (Greece)	83–75	(Israel) Maccabi Tel Aviv
Scoring by quarter: 12-19, 19-15, 22-19, 30-22
Pts: Kaimakoglou 18; Rebs: Homan 10; Asts: Lucas 6		Pts: Perkins 18; Rebs: Anderson, Lasme, Bluthenthal 5 Asts: Perkins 5

Athens Olympic Sports Complex
Attendance: 5,100
Referees: Ilija Belošević (SRB), Matej Boltauzer (SLO), Sasa Maricic (SRB)

14 January 2010
19:00

Report

Lottomatica Roma (Italy)	69–48	(Slovenia) Union Olimpija Ljubljana
Scoring by quarter: 13-5, 15-10, 21-13, 20-20
Pts: Jaaber 23; Rebs: Jaaber 7 Asts: Jaaber, Minard, Vitali 3		Pts: Vidmar 8 Rebs: Aleksandrov, Walsh 6 Asts: Millage 2

PalaLottomatica
Attendance: 3,663
Referees: Dani Hierrezuelo (ESP), Robert Vyklicky (CZE), Robert Lottermoser (GER)

14 January 2010
19:00

Report

CSKA Moscow (Russia)	84–83	(Spain) Caja Laboral Baskonia
Scoring by quarter: 18-24, 23-15, 27-24, 16-20
Pts: Šiškauskas, Langdon 21; Rebs: Khryapa 11; Asts: Khryapa 5		Pts: Teletović 21; Rebs: Splitter 7 Asts: Teletović 4

CSKA Universal Sports Hall
Attendance: 4,000
Referees: Luigi Lamonica (ITA), Costas Mouzakis (GRE), Marko Juras (SRB)
