= Beat Shazam =

American television game show

- Genre: Game show
- Created by: Jeff Apploff; Wes Kauble
- Directed by: Russell Norman (2017–2019); Debbie Palacio (2021); Diccon Ramsay (2022–present)
- Presented by: Jamie Foxx; Nick Cannon (Note: Guest in Season 6)
- Starring: October Gonzalez; Corinne Foxx; Kelly Osbourne
- Narrated by: DJ Irie
- Composer: Burnett Music Group
- Country of origin: United States
- Original language: English
- No. of seasons: 8
- No. of episodes: 100 (list of episodes)

Production
- Executive producers: Jeff Apploff; Mark Burnett; Jamie Foxx; Barry Poznick; Rich Riley (2017–2018); Lauren Zalaznick; Sean O'Riordan (2022–present); Pat Kiely (2022–present)
- Production locations: Television City (2017–2021); Ardmore Studios (2022–present)
- Production companies: Apploff Entertainment; Shazam; MGM Television; BiggerStage (2022–present)

Original release
- Network: Fox
- Release: May 25, 2017 – present

Beat Shazam is an American television musical game show which premiered on Fox on May 25, 2017. The show is hosted primarily by Jamie Foxx, who is also an executive producer for the show along with Jeff Apploff (who created the show with Wes Kauble).

== Gameplay ==
Three teams of two players each compete through four rounds (five in season 1) to identify a series of songs, banking money for each correct answer. After the fourth round (fifth in season 1), the highest-scoring team plays head-to-head against the Shazam app, attempting to increase their winnings by naming up to six songs before it can identify them. Any team that beats Shazam on all six songs wins the grand prize of $1,000,000.

Beat Shazam uses the Billboard Hot 100 music chart as its only source for song titles.

=== Main game ===
==== Season 1 ====
In season 1, the main game consists of five rounds. In each round, a category is given and several songs (usually five, but occasionally four) are played, one at a time and with four choices displayed for each title. Teams separately and secretly lock in their guesses at the title, and the team that chooses correctly in the fastest time wins money. If two or more teams lock in the correct answer and have the same fastest time, they each score for that song. There is no penalty for incorrect answers.

The final song of each round is designated as the "Fast Track" and is played at double the value. During the season finale, this song is played as a "Fast Track Challenge," in which the teams must respond within the time needed for Shazam to identify it. No multiple-choice answers are offered, and only the first team to buzz in is given a chance to name the song and win the money for it.

Round #	Value of final song ("Fast Track")	Value of all other songs
1	$2,000	$1,000
2	$4,000	$2,000
3	$6,000	$3,000
4	$10,000	$5,000
5	$20,000	$10,000

==== Season 2 ====
From season 2 onwards, the main game consists of four rounds. The first round is the "Shazam Shuffle", where each song is from a different category. The first six songs are worth $2,000 each, and the Fast Track is worth $4,000. In the second round, each team picks from two categories, with the category chosen by majority rule, (at least two teams), being played. The first four songs are worth $3,000 each and the Fast Track is worth $6,000, (however, in some episodes of the show, four songs are played in the round instead of five). In the third round, one member of each team plays, the first four songs are worth $5,000 each and the Fast Track is worth $10,000. The fourth round is a standard round played similar to the main game from season 1, where the first four songs are worth $10,000 each and the Fast Track is worth $20,000.

==== Season 3 ====
In season 3, the first two rounds are played the same way as in season 2, with two newly revised rounds. The first round is the "Shazam Shuffle", where only the number of songs is reduced from 7 to 5. The first four songs are worth $2,000 each and the Fast Track is worth $4,000. In the second round, now titled "That's My Jam!", each team picks from two categories, and whichever category chosen by at least two teams gets played. The first three songs are worth $3,000 each and the Fast Track is worth $6,000. In the third round, "Corinne's Choice", the category is chosen by the DJ. The first three songs are worth $5,000 each and the Fast Track is worth $10,000. The fourth round is called "Without Words", where the instrumental part of the song is played. The first three songs are worth $10,000 each and the Fast Track is worth $20,000.

==== Seasons 4–8 ====
The first round is the "Shazam Shuffle", where the first four songs are worth $1,000 each and the Fast Track is worth $2,000. In the second round, "That's My Jam!", the first three songs are worth $2,000 each and the Fast Track is worth $4,000. In the third round, "Corinne's Choice" ("Kelly's Choice" in Season 6), the first three songs are worth $4,000 each and the Fast Track is worth $8,000. In the fourth round, "Without Words", the first three songs are worth $8,000 each and the Fast Track is worth $16,000.

After the second round (third in season 1), the team in last place is eliminated and leaves with nothing. After the fourth round (fifth in season 1), the trailing team is eliminated and receives either a random amount of cash or a tenth of their money (half in the first three seasons). A team can accumulate up to $76,000 ($126,000 in season 1; $124,000 in season 2; $102,000 in season 3) during the main game. In the event of a tie after rounds two or four (three or five in season 1), one additional song, with no category given, is played as a tiebreaker, using the same rules as the main game. No money is awarded for the tiebreaker song, but the team that answers it correctly in the fastest time moves on to the next round.

=== Bonus Round: Beat Shazam ===
In the bonus round, the winning team tries to identify six more songs, one at a time, before Shazam can do so. Each song is in a different category. The first five questions are worth $25,000 each, and the team must give the exact title for each song. A yellow ring on the gameboard acts as a timer; the contestants must buzz in before it is completely gone.

After the first five songs, the team is given the category for the sixth and final song. They may choose to end the game and keep all their winnings, or have one player attempt to answer. If they fail to answer or give an incorrect answer, they lose half their money. If they missed one of the first five songs, a correct answer on the final song doubles the team's money; if they answered all five correctly, a correct answer on the final song increases their winnings to the grand prize of $1,000,000. Teams that choose not to attempt the final song are given a chance to see if they could have answered it in time.

Without winning the grand prize, a team can win up to $352,000 ($452,000 in season 1; $448,000 in season 2; $404,000 in season 3) over the course of the entire game, by identifying every song in the main game, beating Shazam on four of the first five songs in the bonus round, then beating it again on the sixth.

==== Top prize winners ====
Five teams have successfully "Beat Shazam" and won the $1,000,000 grand prize:

- Christina Porcelli and Steve Lester (Season 1; June 22, 2017)
- Donna Natosi and Ryan Walton (Season 2; June 26, 2018)
- Brothers Aaron and Martin Smith (Season 3 premiere; Teacher's Special; May 20, 2019)
- Brothers James and Justin Kendall (Season 6; Sibling Smackdown; June 6, 2023)
- Beth Wellman and Lauren Jones Kenny (Season 6 finale; Battle of the Ages; September 12, 2023)

== Production ==
On August 8, 2016, it was announced that Fox had ordered the series, with Jamie Foxx announced as host on January 11, 2017.

On July 12, 2017, Fox renewed the series for a second season, which premiered on May 29, 2018.

On August 21, 2018, Fox renewed the series for a third season that premiered on May 20, 2019.

On January 31, 2020, the series was renewed for a fourth season, which was originally going to premiere later that year, but due to the COVID-19 pandemic, it instead premiered on June 3, 2021.

On April 5, 2022, the series was renewed for a fifth season, which premiered on May 23.

On April 5, 2023, the series was renewed for a sixth season, which premiered on May 23. On May 3, it was announced that Nick Cannon would serve as guest host for the season, due to Foxx being hospitalized, with Kelly Osbourne serving as guest DJ.

On March 4, 2024, the series was renewed for a seventh season, which premiered on May 28.

On December 19, 2024, the series was renewed for an eighth season, which was originally scheduled to premiere in mid-2025. However, the season was then delayed to premiere on July 28, 2026, which marked the series' 100th episode and its season finale, airing on September 7.

== Episodes ==
Season	Episodes	Originally released	
Season	Episodes	First released	Last released
1	14	May 25, 2017	September 14, 2017
2	14	May 29, 2018	September 18, 2018
3	14	May 20, 2019	December 9, 2019
4	10	June 3, 2021	August 19, 2021
5	12	May 23, 2022	September 5, 2022
6	12	May 23, 2023	September 12, 2023
7	12	May 28, 2024	September 17, 2024
8	12	July 28, 2026	September 7, 2026

== Awards and nominations ==
Year	Award	Category	Nominee	Result	Ref.
2017	Teen Choice Awards	Choice Summer TV Show	Beat Shazam	Nominated	
2018	Teen Choice Awards	Choice Summer TV Show	Beat Shazam	Nominated	

== Guest appearances ==
- Terrence Howard - Season 1, Episode 1
- Odell Beckham Jr. - Season 1, Episode 2
- Tony Gonzalez - Season 1, Episode 3
- MC Hammer - Season 1, Episode 4
- Snoop Dogg - Season 1, Episode 5
- Mariah Carey - Season 1, Episode 6
- Christina Milian - Season 1, Episode 11
- Kareem Abdul-Jabbar - Season 2, Episode 2
- Michael Bolton - Season 2, Episode 3
- Bell Biv DeVoe - Season 2, Episode 4
- Ginuwine - Season 2, Episode 5
- Smokey Robinson - Season 2, Episode 8
- TLC - Season 2, Episode 9
- Joey McIntyre, Lance Bass, Shaquille O'Neal - Season 2, Episode 11

An episode featuring a guest appearance by Demi Lovato was slated to air on July 24, 2018, but a different new episode was shown instead due to Lovato's hospitalization after an apparent overdose. The episode eventually aired on September 11, 2018 with Lovato's appearance edited out. Her appearance was broadcast by GameTV on September 29, 2020.
