= Westlake High School (Texas) =

Public high school in Travis County, Texas, United States

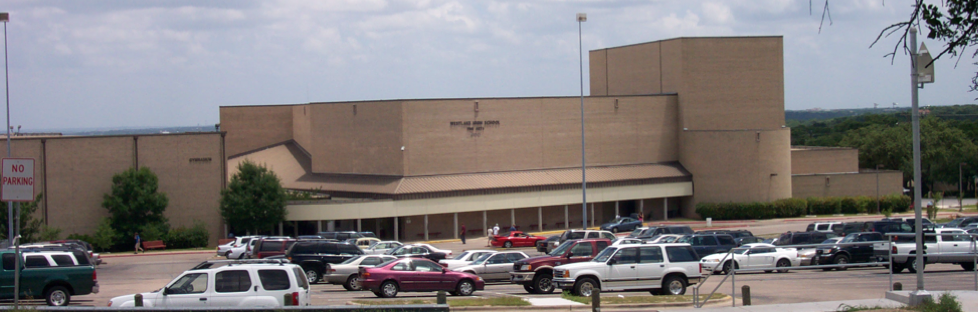

Location
- 4100 Westbank Drive; Austin, Travis County, Texas 78746; United States; 30°16′33″N 97°48′56″W

Information
- Type: Public high school
- Opened: 1969 (57 years ago)
- School district: Eanes Independent School District
- Superintendent: Kirk Konnecke
- Principal: Steve Ramsey
- Teaching staff: 196.33 (FTE)
- Grades: 9–12
- Gender: Coeducational
- Enrollment: 2,899 (2025-2026)
- Student to teacher ratio: 14.32
- Colors: Red, Blue and White
- Athletics conference: UIL Class 6A
- Team name: Chaparrals
- Newspaper: Featherduster
- Yearbook: El Paisano
- Website: Official Website

Westlake High School is a public high school in unincorporated territory of Travis County, Texas, west of and adjacent to Austin. The school is a part of the Eanes Independent School District. Westlake High School is the only high school in the Eanes ISD and serves West Lake Hills, Rollingwood, parts of Southwest Austin, as well as parts of unincorporated Travis County. The school was established in 1969 and opened in 1970.

== Extracurricular activities ==
Westlake was moved to the state's highest classification in 2014 when Texas added a 6A classification.

Sport	State titles	Championship years
Football	4	1996(5A), 2019(6A/D2), 2020(6A/D1), 2021(6A/D2)
Baseball	2	1980(3A), 1984(4A)
Girls basketball	3	1993(4A), 1995(5A), 1996(5A)
Boys cross country	2	1979(B), 1981(4A)
Girls cross country	5	1975(B), 1976(B), 1977(B), 1985(4A), 1990(4A)
Boys Golf	15	1980(3A), 1996(5A), 1999(5A), 2001(5A), 2009(5A), 2010(5A), 2014(5A), 2017(6A), 2018(6A), 2019(6A), 2021(6A), 2022(6A), 2023(6A), 2025(6A), 2026(6A)
Girls Golf	5	2010(5A), 2011(5A), 2018(6A), 2019(6A), 2026(6A)
Boys swimming	1	2006(5A)
Girls swimming	7	1980(All), 1996(All), 1997(All), 2007(5A), 2008(5A), 2014(5A), 2015(5A)
Team tennis	6	1984(4A), 1985(4A), 1992(4A), 2006(5A), 2007(5A), 2009(4A)
Volleyball	4	1991(4A), 1993(4A), 2002(5A), 2004(5A)
Rugby	2	2015, 2016
Cheerleading	4	2013, 2014, 2015, 2019 UCA Super Varsity Division 1 National High School Cheerleading Championships.
Band	5	The Westlake High School Chaparral Band has been named the Texas State Honor Band three times (AA, AAA, and AAAA) in its 30-year history. Marching Band Sweepstakes Champions: 1979(3A), 1982(3A)
=== Academics === : UIL Academic Meet Champions; 1993(4A)

=== Other sports ===
- Basketball
- Lacrosse
- Soccer
- Softball
- Track
- Flag football
- Dance

== Awards and recognition ==
- In Newsweek Magazine's list of America's top High Schools Westlake was ranked #72 in 2011, #160 in 2012, #93 in 2013, and #117 in 2014.
- In high school rankings by The Washington Post, Westlake was #52 in 2010, #59 in 2011, #106 in 2012, #136 in 2013, and #136 in 2014.
- In the U.S. News & World Report's 2023-2024 rankings, Westlake is listed as #299 out of 17,680 schools.

== Notable alumni ==
- KJ Adams Jr., Kansas Jayhawks basketball forward
- Kyle Adams, former NFL tight end
- Calvin Anderson, NFL offensive lineman
- Angela Bettis, actress
- Ben Breedlove, internet celebrity
- Drew Brees, former NFL quarterback and Super Bowl XLIV champion
- Bradley Buckman, former professional basketball player
- Ethan Burke, college football player for the Texas Longhorns
- Fernanda Contreras Gómez, professional tennis player
- Courtney Duever, basketball player who played professionally in Australia and Bulgaria
- Sam Ehlinger, NFL quarterback for the Denver Broncos
- Nick Foles, NFL quarterback and Super Bowl LII champion
- Theo Gillen, baseball player
- Jaden Greathouse, college football player for Notre Dame
- Camila Grey, singer
- Kelly Gruber, former MLB infielder and 1992 World Series champion
- Lindsey Harris, professional soccer player
- Jesse Heiman, actor
- Josh Ilika, Olympic swimmer
- Alexis Jones, activist and motivational speaker
- Cade Klubnik, college football player for Clemson
- Will Licon, NCAA champion swimmer
- Paul London, professional wrestler
- Bray Lynch, college football offensive lineman for the Indiana Hoosiers
- Seth McKinney, former NFL offensive lineman
- Chris Mihm, former NBA center
- Akshay Nanavati, author
- Tanner Price, football quarterback
- Rich Riley, business executive
- Kristen Silverberg, former US ambassador to the European Union
- Scott Spann, Olympic swimmer
- Huston Street, former MLB pitcher
- James P. Sullivan, current Justice of Supreme Court of Texas
- Ryan Swope, former NFL wide receiver
- Michael Taaffe, defensive back for the Miami Dolphins
- Lia Thomas, NCAA champion swimmer
- Justin Tucker, NFL kicker, Super Bowl XLVII champion
- Ross Ulbricht, creator of the Silk Road
- Colton Vasek, college football player for the Texas Longhorns
- Lauren Worsham, actress

== In popular culture ==
Neptune High, the high school in Veronica Mars, is partially based on Westlake, where the father of writer-producer Rob Thomas once served as vice-principal.
