= List of Beat Shazam episodes =

Beat Shazam is an American television musical game show which premiered on Fox on May 25, 2017. The show is hosted by Jamie Foxx, who is also an executive producer on the show along with Jeff Apploff (who created the show with Wes Kauble).

As of September 7, 2026, 100 episodes of Beat Shazam have aired.

== Series overview ==
Season	Episodes	Originally released	
Season	Episodes	First released	Last released
1	14	May 25, 2017	September 14, 2017
2	14	May 29, 2018	September 18, 2018
3	14	May 20, 2019	December 9, 2019
4	10	June 3, 2021	August 19, 2021
5	12	May 23, 2022	September 5, 2022
6	12	May 23, 2023	September 12, 2023
7	12	May 28, 2024	September 17, 2024
8	12	July 28, 2026	September 7, 2026

== Episodes ==
=== Season 1 (2017) ===
No. overall	No. in season	Title	Original release date	U.S. viewers (millions)	Rating/share (18–49)
1	1	"Episode 1"	May 25, 2017	3.64	1.2/5
2	2	"Episode 2"	June 1, 2017	3.43	1.1/5
3	3	"Episode 3"	June 8, 2017	2.94	1.0/5
4	4	"Episode 4"	June 22, 2017	3.17	1.0/5
5	5	"Episode 5"	June 29, 2017	3.11	0.9/4
6	6	"Episode 6"	July 13, 2017	2.95	0.9/4
7	7	"Episode 7"	July 20, 2017	2.85	0.8/4
8	8	"Episode 8"	July 27, 2017	2.85	0.9/4
9	9	"Episode 9"	August 3, 2017	2.70	0.8/3
10	10	"Episode 10"	August 10, 2017	2.19	0.7/3
11	11	"Episode 11"	August 17, 2017	2.52	0.7/3
12	12	"Episode 12"	August 24, 2017	2.44	0.7/3
13	13	"Episode 13"	September 7, 2017	2.42	0.8/3
14	14	"Episode 14"	September 14, 2017	2.44	0.7/3

=== Season 2 (2018) ===
No. overall	No. in season	Title	Original release date	U.S. viewers (millions)	Rating/share (18–49)
15	1	"Episode 1"	May 29, 2018	2.48	0.8/4
16	2	"Episode 2"	June 5, 2018	2.15	0.7/3
17	3	"Episode 3"	June 12, 2018	2.32	0.8/3
18	4	"Episode 4"	June 19, 2018	2.22	0.7/3
19	5	"Episode 5"	June 26, 2018	2.24	0.7/3
20	6	"Episode 6"	July 10, 2018	2.28	0.7/3
21	7	"Episode 7"	July 24, 2018	2.29	0.7/3
22	8	"Episode 8"	July 31, 2018	2.37	0.7/3
23	9	"Episode 9"	August 7, 2018	2.18	0.7/3
24	10	"Episode 10"	August 14, 2018	2.06	0.6/3
25	11	"Episode 11"	August 21, 2018	2.19	0.7/3
26	12	"Episode 12"	September 4, 2018	2.08	0.7/3
27	13	"Episode 13"	September 11, 2018	2.21	0.7/3
28	14	"Episode 14"	September 18, 2018	2.34	0.8/3

=== Season 3 (2019) ===
No. overall	No. in season	Title	Original release date	U.S. viewers (millions)	Rating/share (18–49)
29	1	"Teachers Win Big!"	May 20, 2019	2.47	0.7/4
30	2	"Keep The Faith"	May 27, 2019	2.43	0.6/3
31	3	"Beauty & The Beats"	June 3, 2019	2.86	0.7/4
32	4	"Bi Coastal Battle Royale"	June 10, 2019	2.59	0.6/4
33	5	"#Daddydaughtertime"	June 17, 2019	2.20	0.6/3
34	6	"Our Most Dominant Team Ever!"	June 24, 2019	2.42	0.6/3
35	7	"Playing For The Million... Again!"	July 8, 2019	2.35	0.6/3
36	8	"Lovers, Friends, & Flossers!"	July 15, 2019	2.54	0.6/4
37	9	"A Game Of One Word"	July 22, 2019	2.46	0.6/3
38	10	"Southern Fried Shazam!"	July 29, 2019	2.29	0.5/3
39	11	"Besties and Big Bros"	August 5, 2019	2.51	0.6/3
40	12	"It's All Riding On Rihanna!"	August 12, 2019	2.54	0.6/4
41	13	"Air... Sea... Hawaii"	August 19, 2019	2.61	0.6/4
42	14	"Santa Jamie"	December 9, 2019	1.97	0.5/3

=== Season 4 (2021) ===
No. overall	No. in season	Title	Original release date	U.S. viewers (millions)	Rating/share (18–49)
43	1	"Everybody Dance Now!"	June 3, 2021	1.77	0.5/3
44	2	"Beat Shazam Celebrity Challenge!"	June 10, 2021	2.03	0.5/4
45	3	"Daddy-Daughter Time"	June 17, 2021	1.84	0.5/4
46	4	"Teachers Edition!"	June 24, 2021	1.89	0.5/4
47	5	"Going for the Gold!"	July 1, 2021	1.88	0.4/3
48	6	"Two Million Dollar Challenge!"	July 8, 2021	2.01	0.4/4
49	7	"Grandma's Got Game!"	July 15, 2021	2.00	0.5/4
50	8	"All About The Abs, Butt and Thighs!"	July 22, 2021	1.86	0.4/3
51	9	"Our Most Shocking Show Ever!"	August 18, 2021	1.52	0.4/3
52	10	"Battle for Beyonce!"	August 19, 2021	1.86	0.5/4

=== Season 5 (2022) ===
No. overall	No. in season	Title	Original release date	U.S. viewers (millions)	Rating/share (18–49)
53	1	"Friends, Family and Trash!"	May 23, 2022	1.89	0.4/3
54	2	"Holding Out for a Hero!"	May 30, 2022	1.77	0.3/3
55	3	"Did She Just Do the Splits?!?!?"	June 6, 2022	1.99	0.4/3
56	4	"Daddy-Daughter Time"	June 13, 2022	1.65	0.3/2
57	5	"We Got a Barn-Burner!"	June 20, 2022	1.85	0.3/3
58	6	"Million-Dollar Mommies!"	June 27, 2022	1.81	0.3/3
59	7	"It's a Family Affair!"	July 18, 2022	1.87	0.3/3
60	8	"Who Ya Gonna Call?"	August 1, 2022	1.97	0.4/3
61	9	"Schoolhouse Rock!"	August 8, 2022	1.89	0.3/3
62	10	"Who's Gonna Get That Money?"	August 22, 2022	1.73	0.3/3
63	11	"You're My Best Friend"	August 29, 2022	1.86	0.4/3
64	12	"Shake Your Pom Poms!"	September 5, 2022	1.62	0.3/2

=== Season 6 (2023) ===
No. overall	No. in season	Title	Original release date	U.S. viewers (millions)	Rating/share (18–49)
65	1	"It's a Family Affair"	May 23, 2023	1.15	0.2/2
66	2	"Schoolhouse Rock!"	May 30, 2023	1.14	0.2/2
67	3	"Sibling Smackdown!"	June 6, 2023	1.19	0.3/3
68	4	"Father's Day Face Off!"	June 13, 2023	1.03	0.2/2
69	5	"Did She Say Nuns?!?!"	June 20, 2023	1.07	0.2/3
70	6	"Can Mama Make a Million?"	July 18, 2023	1.12	0.2/2
71	7	"From Worst to First!"	August 1, 2023	1.01	0.2/3
72	8	"Let's Get Busy!"	August 15, 2023	1.19	0.2/3
73	9	"Hip Hop or Country?"	August 22, 2023	1.12	0.2/3
74	10	"Besties All Around!"	August 29, 2023	1.11	0.2/2
75	11	"This One's Got It All!"	September 5, 2023	1.21	0.2/2
76	12	"Battle of the Ages!"	September 12, 2023	1.22	0.3/3

=== Season 7 (2024) ===
No. overall	No. in season	Title	Original release date	U.S. viewers (millions)	Rating/share (18–49)
77	1	"Jamie's Back!"	May 28, 2024	1.27	0.2/3
78	2	"School's Out!"	June 4, 2024	1.30	0.2/2
79	3	"Father's Day Face-Off!"	June 11, 2024	1.45	0.3/4
80	4	"Rihanna in the House!"	June 18, 2024	1.78	0.3/4
81	5	"Million Dollar Mommas!"	June 25, 2024	1.25	0.2/3
82	6	"The Higher the Hair, The Closer to Heaven!"	July 9, 2024	1.31	0.3/3
83	7	"We're Ready, But Is Shazam Ready?"	July 23, 2024	1.17	0.2/3
84	8	"We Gotta Love Nirvana!"	August 20, 2024	1.07	0.2/2
85	9	"Corinne's Big Day"	August 27, 2024	1.39	0.2/3
86	10	"Beatbox Shazam"	September 3, 2024	1.34	0.2/3
87	11	"Hero vs Hero"	September 17, 2024	1.17	0.2/3
88	12	"Sibling Smackdown"	September 17, 2024	1.17	0.2/3

=== Season 8 (2026) ===
On December 19, 2024, Beat Shazam was renewed for an eighth season which was scheduled to premiere in mid-2025; however, in 2025, the series was placed on hiatus and it was unclear (at the time) when or if the eighth season will air. Eventually, it was announced that the season would premiere on July 28, 2026, which marked the series' 100th episode, which was its season finale on September 7.

No. overall	No. in season	Title	Original release date	U.S. viewers (millions)	Rating/share (18–49)
89	1	"The Foxxs Are Back on FOX!"	July 28, 2026	N/A	TBA
90	2	"No One Can Stop Them!"	August 4, 2026	N/A	TBA
91	3	"Which is Best, South, East or West?"	August 11, 2026	N/A	TBA
92	4	"Girl Power Hour!"	August 18, 2026	TBD	TBA
93	5	"Shazam Bowl!"	August 24, 2026	TBD	TBA
94	6	"Shazam and Chill!"	August 24, 2026	TBD	TBA
95	7	"8th Time's A Charm!"	August 25, 2026	TBD	TBA
96	8	"Battle Of The Best Friends!"	August 31, 2026	TBD	TBA
97	9	"College Night!"	August 31, 2026	TBD	TBA
98	10	"Who's Getting Schooled?"	September 1, 2026	TBD	TBA
99	11	"I Need A Hero!"	September 7, 2026	TBD	TBA
100	12	"Beat Shazam's 100th Episode!"	September 7, 2026	TBD	TBA
