= Alexis Jones =

American activist, author, media personality and motivational speaker

- Born: July 6, 1983 (age 43); Austin, Texas, U.S.
- Education: USC (B.A., Master's)
- Occupations: Motivational speaker, activist, television personality, film producer
- Known for: Survivor: Micronesia
- Spouse: Brad Buckman (m. 2015)
- Website: alexisjones.com

Alexis Whitney Jones (born July 6, 1983) is an American activist and motivational speaker best known for competing on the reality competition show Survivor.

== Early life and education ==
Jones was born in Austin, Texas, and grew up there with her mother, father and four older brothers. Her parents divorced when she was young. She attended Westlake High School just outside of Austin, and after graduation, she enrolled at the University of Southern California (USC), where she earned a Bachelor of Arts in International Relations as well as a Master of Communication Management degree, the latter of which was completed in only one year. While at USC, she was a member of the Kappa Kappa Gamma sorority (ΚΚΓ). In addition, she performed in The Vagina Monologues and also worked at Fox Sports while attending college.

== Career ==
While still an undergraduate, Jones came up with the idea for a non-profit organization called I Am That Girl, whose main purpose would be to fight media-perpetuated notions of perfectionism that many young girls and women face. Upon finishing graduate school, she officially started I Am That Girl (IATG), using television appearances to promote it. As of 2017, IATG has over 175 chapters around the world.

In 2013, Jones organized the first TED^{x} Austin Women conference. Since then, she has also founded an organization called ProtectHer, which started as a result of a series of speaking gigs in the locker rooms of various collegiate men's athletic programs. In 2017, she introduced to college campuses a film and curriculum series through ProtectHer, in an effort to educate young student-athletes about sexual assault, and to encourage treating women with respect.

== Survivor ==
In 2007, Jones auditioned for the reality competition show Survivor: Micronesia — Fans vs. Favorites. Although she had missed the deadline for auditioning, she begged producers to meet with her in hopes of getting on the show that season. She was ultimately cast as one of the 20 players competing on Fans vs. Favorites, which aired in the Spring of 2008.

Jones was initially placed on the Airai tribe, which consisted of ten brand new players, or "Fans;" while the opposing tribe, Malakal, consisted of ten returning players, or "Favorites". She remained on Airai even during the tribal switch on Day 12. Prior to the Day 22 merge, she became part of a Final Four alliance with fellow Fan Natalie Bolton, new Airai tribemate Parvati Shallow, and Favorite Amanda Kimmel. Favorite Cirie Fields later joined this alliance, which would come to be known as the "Black Widow Brigade".

On Day 31, Jones won the Loved Ones reward challenge, which allowed her to take a trip to Jellyfish Lake with her brother Nathan; she invited Fields and her husband, and Bolton and her mother, to come along as well. Jones also got to send another castaway to Exile Island, and when Kimmel volunteered to be exiled, Jones obliged. But while she was on the reward, Kimmel found a clue on Exile Island to the whereabouts of a hidden immunity idol.

At the Final Tribal Council, Kimmel and Shallow were the two remaining finalists. During the jury questioning, Jones asked Shallow to explain why the latter might be better suited than Kimmel to be a role model for young girls. Jones also asked Kimmel to identify a part of Kimmel's game that was genuine. In the end, Jones cast her vote for Shallow to win Sole Survivor.

== Other works ==
Jones once served as a life coach on the MTV show MADE. She has also contributed articles to the Huffington Post. In 2014, she released a book, inspired by her Web site; the book's foreword was written by her sorority sister, actress Sophia Bush. Jones was also an executive producer on the documentary film A Brave Heart: The Lizzie Velasquez Story, about fellow motivational speaker Lizzie Velásquez's struggles with body-shaming. The film had its world premiere at SXSW on March 14, 2015. Six days later, Jones herself was featured on an episode of TLC's Say Yes to the Dress, where she picked out the dress for her forthcoming wedding to former University of Texas men's basketball star Brad Buckman.

== Personal life ==
In 2012, Jones' father was diagnosed with cancer. Upon hearing the news, she immediately returned home to Austin to take care of him. In 2014, Jones learned that her father's cancer was in remission.

While back in Austin, she had reconnected with Buckman. They had attended middle school and high school together before each attending separate colleges. As soon as they reconnected, Buckman confessed that he had experienced a crush on her since childhood, but had never said anything about it. Soon after, they began dating. On September 12, 2015, she married Buckman in Coeur d'Alene, Idaho.

On March 20, 2016, Jones and her mother were traveling in their car through the streets of Los Angeles, when some men in another vehicle next to them got their attention while stopped at an intersection. The women thought that these men were yelling vulgarities and making obscene gestures to them, so Jones took out her phone and snapped some pictures of the men just before they drove away from the scene. After posting these photos on Instagram, in hopes of getting someone to identify who the men were, two of them were identified as professional basketball stars Jordan Clarkson and Nick Young of the Los Angeles Lakers. Once the team looked into the incident and was able to speak with Jones, Clarkson, and Young, the Lakers concluded that all parties involved had come up with "different interpretations" of what happened on the night in question. No charges or disciplinary action were brought forth, and the Lakers went on to express their continued support of the two players, while also supporting Jones' feelings over the incident; the club even praised her organization for the work it does for women. Jones said that she was "inspired" by the way the Lakers responded after a team spokesperson apologized to her, and she was even invited by the club to give a speech to its players on the issue of respecting women.

== Bibliography ==
- I Am That Girl; Evolve (2014), ISBN 978-0989322287
