= Rich Riley =

American businessman and entrepreneur (born 1973)

- Born: August 17, 1973 (age 53); Washington DC, U.S.
- Education: University of Pennsylvania (BS)
- Occupation: co-CEO
- Employer: Origin Materials
- Organization: Young Presidents' Organization
- Board member of: Wharton School Entrepreneurial Advisory Board

Rich Riley (born August 17, 1973) is an American businessman and entrepreneur. He was co-CEO of Origin Materials, a chemicals and materials company, before his resignation at the end of 2024. He was formerly the Chief Executive Officer of Shazam. He was an executive at Yahoo! from 1999 to 2013.

== Early life and education ==
Riley grew up in Austin, Texas, and attended Westlake High School. He earned a Bachelor of Science in economics with concentrations in finance and entrepreneurial management from the Wharton School of the University of Pennsylvania.

== Career ==
=== Log-Me-On.com ===
Riley was co-founder and managing member of Log-Me-On.com when he was 25. The company developed and patented what is today the Yahoo! Toolbar; Yahoo! bought Log-Me-On in 1999.

=== Yahoo! ===
After the sale of Log-Me-On, Riley started at Yahoo! as a manager in Corporate Development and became a director of Business Development, senior vice president of the Small & Medium Business Division, managing director and senior vice president of the EMEA Region, and finally executive vice president of the Americas, during which he reported to the CEO and was a member of Yahoo’s Executive Management team.

=== Shazam ===
In 2013, Riley became CEO of Shazam, replacing Andrew Fisher, who now serves as Executive Chairman. Shazam was acquired by Apple in 2017. Riley is an executive producer of the Fox TV series Beat Shazam, based on the app and hosted by Jamie Foxx, also an executive producer.

=== Origin Materials ===
Riley is the former co-CEO of Origin Materials, a chemicals and materials company. He resigned, effective December 31, 2024.

== Recognition ==
- In October 2011, Riley was listed in Fortune's "40 under 40: Ones to Watch".
- Riley has been included in the Billboard 2015, 2016 and 2017 Power 100 lists.
- Riley won the distinguished alumni award from Westlake High School.

== Personal life ==
Riley serves on the Wharton School Entrepreneurial Advisory Board and is a member of the Young Presidents' Organization. He is married to Michelle Leone Riley; in 2005, he and his wife established a scholarship to assist a needy undergraduate attending the University of Pennsylvania. They live in New Canaan, Connecticut, and have four children.
