= Akshay Nanavati =

United States Marine Corps veteran

- Education: Southwestern University (BA) (2009); Syracuse University (MA) (2010)
- Occupations: Speaker, author, runner, entrepreneur
- Known for: Fearvana
- Website: fearvana.com

Akshay Nanavati (born October 15, 1984) is a United States Marine veteran, speaker, entrepreneur, ultra runner and author. He served in Iraq during Operation Iraqi Freedom and was later diagnosed with post traumatic stress disorder. His book Fearvana was endorsed by the Dalai Lama and Jack Canfield.

== Early life and education ==
Nanavati did his Bachelors of Arts in History at Southwestern University. During his high school years at Westlake High School, he watched the film Black Hawk Down, which inspired him to join the United States Marine Corps. The next year he for his MA in Journalism from Syracuse University. He currently lives in Scottsdale, Arizona. His mother, Anjali, is also a published author.

== Career ==
After overcoming drug addiction, despite two doctors suggesting basic training could kill him because of a blood disorder, he enlisted in the Marines. Nanavati was then sent to Haditha, Iraq during Operation Iraqi Freedom. He was an infantry non-commissioned officer, where one of his jobs was to walk in front of vehicles to find improvised explosive devices and another as communications liaison.

He received his Masters of Arts in journalism from Syracuse University's S. I. Newhouse School of Public Communications. He ended his tenure in the military as a sergeant before graduating. He was also diagnosed by the Department of Veterans Affairs with post traumatic stress disorder and survivor's guilt, which led him to alcoholism and depression before realizing he was on the brink of suicide. As a result, this led him to research neuroscience, psychology and spirituality.

While at base in Iraq, he started to run to cope with the stress of war, including running long distances and ultramarathons. In addition to becoming an ultrarunner, he also took up skydiving, mountain biking, scuba diving, rock climbing, ice climbing, mountaineering and polar exploration, in trying to deal with his fears. He is also a public speaker. He had also served with Graham Dale.

In December 2021, he skied up the Axel Heiberg Glacier in Antarctica. In Fall 2023 through 2024, he had planned to do a first solo pan-Antarctica trip, which was postponed by a year for logistical reasons.

== Fearvana ==
His philosophy is about fighting fear. As a result of his research, he wrote Fearvana which is, in his words, about the "revolutionary science of how to turn fear into health, wealth and happiness." His research led him to believe in neuroplasticity and said of neuroscience, psychology and spirituality that:

Fearvana teaches the science of how to transform all your seemingly negative emotions into health, wealth and happiness. Fearvana’s revolutionary approach shatters conventional wisdom, giving you the tools to leverage your fear, stress and anxiety to accomplish anything you set your mind to.

The Dalai Lama wrote the foreword for his book.

I am happy that Akshay Nanavati has found the strength to overcome the traumatic experiences of his life and has developed the aspiration to help others. His book, Fearvana, inspires us to look beyond our own agonizing experiences, suggesting means for overcoming our fears. I appreciate his sincerity and hope that others will find reason and the encouragement to see the positive side of their lives.

It was also endorsed by Jack Canfield, amongst others. All his profits from the book go towards his non-profit, Fearvana Foundation, which sought funding for a vocational school in post-civil war in Liberia, amongst other projects.

== Antarctica ==
Nanavati is planning to be the first one to solo cross Antarctica, without aid, in the 2024-2025 southern summer. In this regard, in 2024, he trained in Alaska, USA, Iceland, Norway and Greenland.

As he started the "Great Soul Crossing" in November, it was listed in the mainstream media.

== Bibliography ==
- Nanavati, Akshay. 2017. Fearvana: The Revolutionary Science of How to Turn Fear into Health, Wealth and Happiness. Morgan James Publishing.
