= John Williamson (basketball, born 1986) =

American basketball player

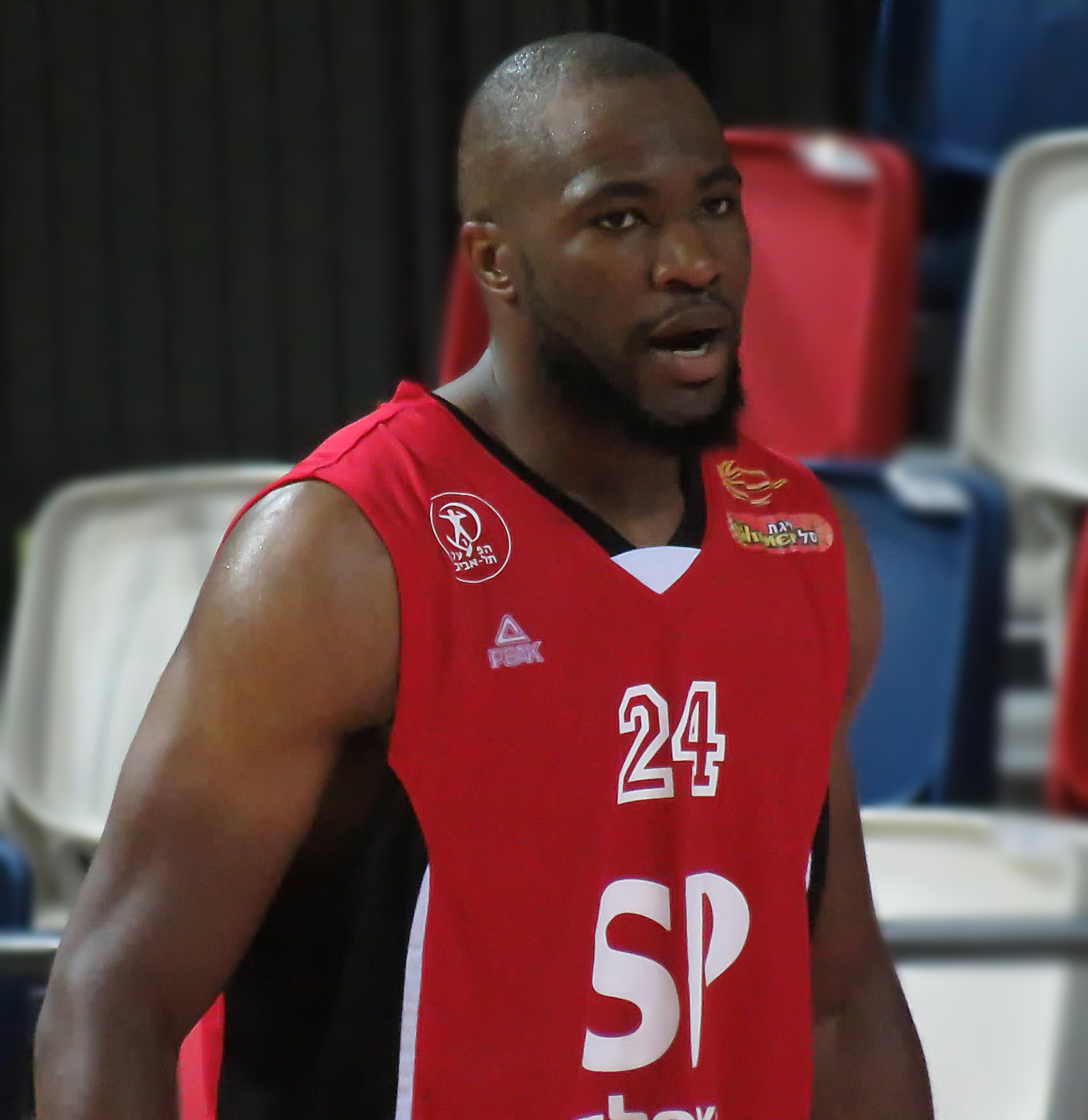
- Williamson playing for Hapoel Tel Aviv in 2015

Free agent
- Position: Power forward

Personal information
- Born: August 19, 1986 (age 40) Columbus, Ohio, U.S.
- Listed height: 6 ft 7 in (2.01 m)
- Listed weight: 225 lb (102 kg)

Career information
- High school: Marion-Franklin (Columbus, Ohio)
- College: Cincinnati State CC (2004–2006); Cincinnati (2006–2008)
- NBA draft: 2008: undrafted

Career history
- 2012–2013: Fos Ouest Provence Basket
- 2013–2014: Nilan Bisons
- 2014–2015: Ironi Nahariya
- 2015–2016: Hapoel Tel Aviv
- 2016–2017: Bakken Bears
- 2017–2018: Maccabi Kiryat Gat

John Williamson (born August 19, 1986) is an American professional basketball player who last played for Maccabi Kiryat Gat of the Liga Leumit.

== College career ==
Williamson began his college career at Cincinnati State. Williamson averaged 27.4 points and 11.7 rebounds leading the school to a 26–9 record, state and regional titles and the finals of the National Junior College Athletic Association Tournament.

Before his junior season he transferred to the University of Cincinnati for his final two years of college. He was named the team's MVP as based on the following: team leading 7.3 rebounds and was the team's second-leading scorer (13.5). Williamson finished third in the BIG EAST in offensive rebounding (3.3) and ninth overall.

== Professional career ==
Williamson entered the 2008 NBA Draft but was not selected. On November 6, 2013, he signed with the Nilan Bisons after playing for Fos Ouest Provence Basket. On August 19, 2015, he signed to Hapoel Tel Aviv for the 2015–2016 season after competing for Ironi Nahariya for the 2014–2015 season

On October 24, 2017, Williamson returned to Israel for a second stint, signing with Maccabi Kiryat Gat for the 2017–18 season.
