= Hervé Touré =

French professional basketball player (born 1982)

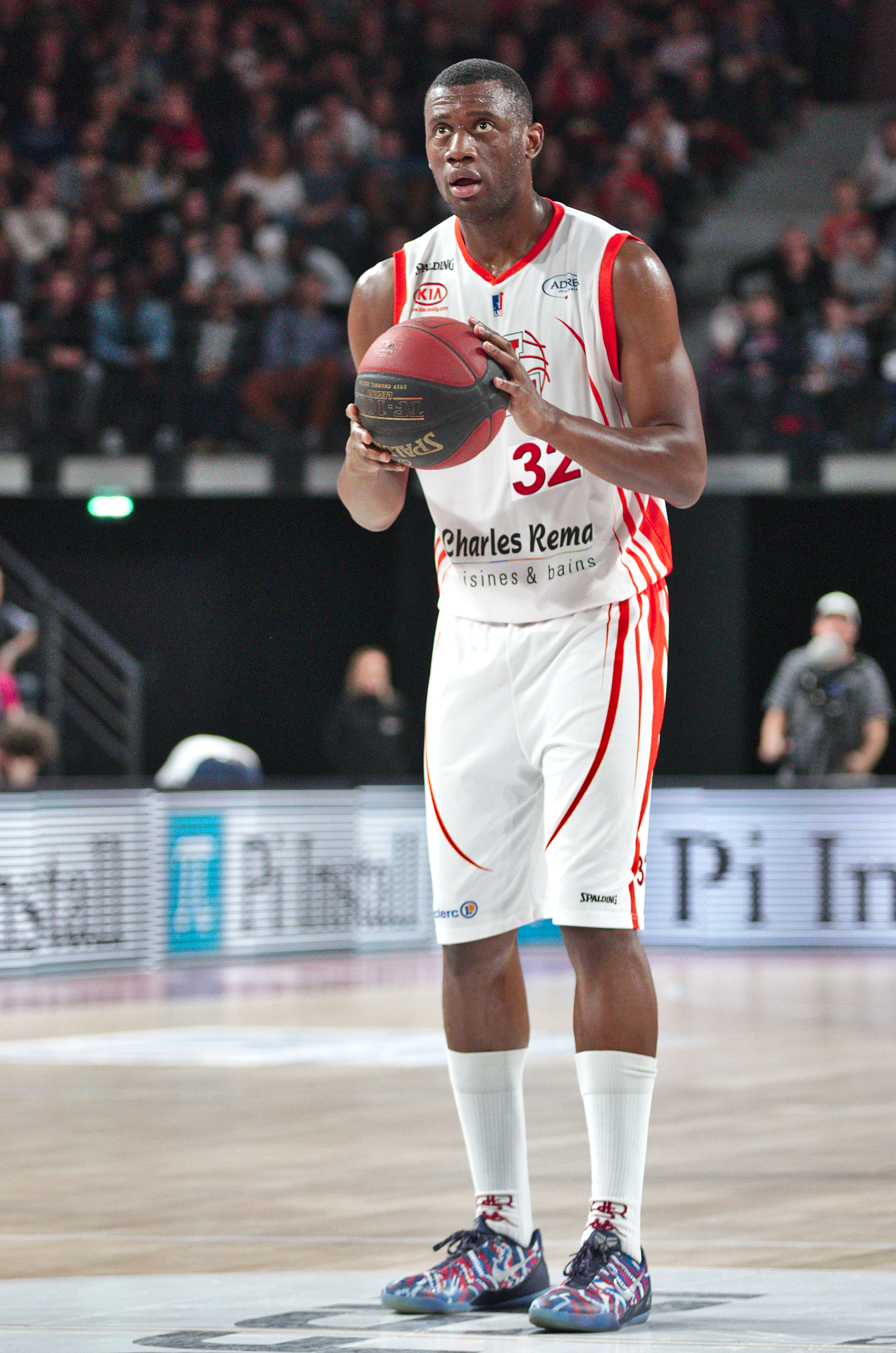

Guaros de Lara
- Position: Forward
- League: Liga Sudamericana

Personal information
- Born: 25 February 1982 (age 44) Lyon, France
- Listed height: 2.04 m (6 ft 8 in)
- Listed weight: 100 kg (220 lb)

Career information
- Playing career: 2001–present

Career history
- 2001–2005: ASVEL Basket
- 2005: Spirou Charleroi
- 2005–2006: Air Avellino
- 2006–2007: Upea Capo d'Orlando
- 2007: Armani Jeans Milano
- 2007–2009: Tisettanta / NGC Cantu
- 2009–2010: Lottomatica Roma
- 2010–2011: Enel Brindisi
- 2011–2012: Blancos de Rueda Valladolid
- 2012: Élan Béarnais Pau-Orthez
- 2012–2013: SLUC Nancy Basket
- 2013: Élan Chalon
- 2013–2014: Paris-Levallois
- 2015: Pmina Isfahan
- 2015–2016: Sagesse-Lebanon
- 2016–2017: Estudiantes Concordia - Argentina
- 2017–2018: Guaros de Lara - Venezuela

Hervé Touré (born 25 February 1982) is a French professional basketball player who currently plays for Guaros de Lara in Venezuela. After starting his career with Asvel Basket, he goes to play in Belgium, Italy and Spain for almost eight years. Then he returned to France in 2012 to emigrate again playing successively in Iran, Lebanon, Argentina and Venezuela where he will cumulate the national and international title of South American League in 2017.

Touré is international with the France team. At 204 cm, he plays the small forward and power forward positions. He is the author of two books written in French dealing with media
