= Matt Walsh (basketball) =

American basketball player (born 1982)

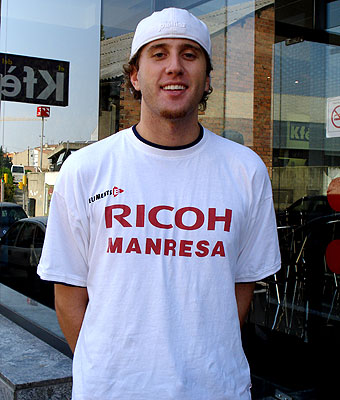
- Walsh in 2007

Personal information
- Born: December 2, 1982 (age 43) Holland, Pennsylvania, U.S.
- Listed height: 6 ft 6 in (1.98 m)
- Listed weight: 205 lb (93 kg)

Career information
- High school: Germantown Academy (Fort Washington, Pennsylvania)
- College: Florida (2002–2005)
- NBA draft: 2005: undrafted
- Playing career: 2005–2015
- Position: Shooting guard / small forward
- Number: 44

Career history
- 2005: Miami Heat
- 2006: Arkansas RimRockers
- 2006–2007: Olympia Larissa
- 2007–2008: Bàsquet Manresa
- 2008–2009: Spirou Charleroi
- 2009–2010: Union Olimpija
- 2010: Aris Thessaloniki
- 2010–2011: ASVEL Villeurbanne
- 2011–2012: UCAM Murcia
- 2012: Caja Laboral
- 2012: Azovmash
- 2012–2013: Spirou Charleroi
- 2013: Brose Baskets
- 2013–2014: Virtus Bologna
- 2014–2015: Eskişehir Basket

Career highlights
- 2× Belgian League champion (2008, 2009); Belgian Cup winner (2009); German League champion (2013); Turkish League Top Scorer (2015); Slovenian Cup winner (2010); Slovenian Supercup winner (2009); 2× Second-team All-SEC (2004, 2005)
- Stats at NBA.com
- Stats at Basketball Reference

Matthew Vincent Walsh (born December 2, 1982) is an American former professional basketball player who played in several leagues across the world for ten seasons. Listed at 6 ft 6 in (1.98 m), he could play both shooting guard and small forward. He played college basketball for the Florida Gators.

== Early years ==
Walsh was born in Philadelphia. He attended Germantown Academy, a private preparatory school in Fort Washington, Pennsylvania, where he played high school basketball for the Germantown Academy Patriots.

== College career ==
Walsh accepted an athletic scholarship to attend the University of Florida in Gainesville, Florida, where he played for coach Billy Donovan's Florida Gators basketball team for three seasons from 2002 to 2005. As a junior, Walsh suffered torn left ankle ligaments and missed several games, but recovered to lead the Gators to the Southeastern Conference (SEC) tournament championship and the second round of the 2005 NCAA Men's Division I Basketball Tournament.

== Professional career ==
The Miami Heat originally signed Walsh as an undrafted free agent out of the University of Florida in 2005. He was then waived on November 18, 2005, after playing in two NBA regular season games. In the 2006 NBA preseason, he was signed by the New Jersey Nets, and they then released him in October.

In the 2006–07 season, Walsh played with Olympia Larissa in the Greek League, having a successful year for both the team and himself. He was considered one of the most valuable players in the Greek League that year, and he was also the second best scorer of the competition, averaging 17.8 points per game. Walsh also played with the Cleveland Cavaliers in the NBA Summer League in 2007, and he later signed a one-year contract with Bàsquet Manresa of the Spanish ACB League.

In August 2009, Walsh signed with the Adriatic League club Union Olimpija. In February 2010, he joined the Greek League club Aris. On October 25, 2010, he signed a one-year contract with ASVEL Lyon-Villeurbanne in France.

In November 2011 Walsh signed with UCAM Murcia in Spain. On January 6, 2012, he signed with Saski Baskonia, also in Spain.

In August 2012, Walsh signed with Spirou Charleroi of Belgium. In February 2013, he joined Brose Baskets Bamberg. On August 2, 2013, he signed a two-year deal with Virtus Bologna. On August 13, 2014, he signed with Eskişehir Basket.

On September 24, 2015, Walsh officially announced his retirement from professional basketball.

On February 25, 2018, it was announced that Walsh was heading a consortium to purchase the New Zealand Breakers of the NBL. He served as majority owner and CEO of the Breakers until August 2023 when he stepped aside from the CEO role. He continued to lead the ownership group until March 2025 when the group sold the club.

== Career statistics ==
Legend
GP	Games played	GS	Games started	MPG	Minutes per game
FG%	Field goal percentage	3P%	3-point field goal percentage	FT%	Free throw percentage
RPG	Rebounds per game	APG	Assists per game	SPG	Steals per game
BPG	Blocks per game	PPG	Points per game	**Bold**	Career high

=== NBA ===
==== Regular season ====
Year	Team	GP	GS	MPG	FG%	3P%	FT%	RPG	APG	SPG	BPG	PPG
2005–06	Miami	2	0	1.5	1.000	–	.000	.0	.0	.0	.0	1.0

== See also ==
- List of Florida Gators in the NBA
