= Mouphtaou Yarou =

American basketball player (born 1990)

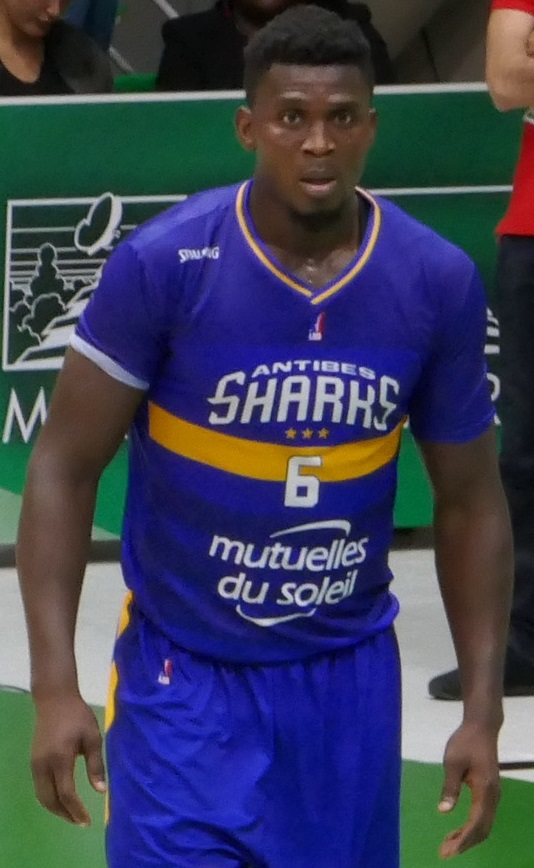
- Yarou with Antibes Sharks in 2017.

Personal information
- Born: 26 June 1990 (age 36) Natitingou, Benin
- Listed height: 6 ft 9 in (2.06 m)
- Listed weight: 260 lb (118 kg)

Career information
- High school: Montrose Christian School (Rockville, Maryland)
- College: Villanova (2009–2013)
- NBA draft: 2013: undrafted
- Playing career: 2013–2022
- Position: Center

Career history
- 2013: Radnički Kragujevac
- 2014–2017: Le Mans
- 2017–2018: Antibes Sharks
- 2018–2020: Levallois Metropolitans
- 2020–2021: Boulazac Basket Dordogne
- 2021: Nanterre 92
- 2021–2022: ESSM Le Portel

Career highlights
- French Cup winner (2016); French League Top Rebounder (2016); Third-team Parade All-American (2009)

Mouphtaou Monra Yarou (born 26 June 1990) is a Beninese former professional basketball player. He played at the collegiate level for the Villanova University Wildcats.

== College career ==
Yarou averaged 8.4 points and 7.1 rebounds per game as a sophomore at Villanova. As a junior, Yarou averaged 11.3 points and 8.2 rebounds per game as Villanova finished 13-19 and missed the NCAA Tournament for the first time since 2004. Yarou averaged 9.9 points and 7.8 rebounds per game for the Wildcats as a senior.

== Professional career ==
In August 2013, he signed a one-year deal with Radnički Kragujevac of Serbia. In nine games, he averaged 11.9 points and 10.6 rebounds per game.

On 6 June 2014 he signed a two-year deal with Le Mans Sarthe Basket of the LNB Pro A.

In July 2016, Yarou joined the Boston Celtics for the 2016 NBA Summer League. On 22 July 2016 he re-signed with Le Mans for one more season.

On 1 September 2017 Yarou signed with Antibes Sharks for the 2017–18 Pro A season.

On 6 June 2018 Yarou signed with Levallois Metropolitans.

On 25 May 2020 he signed with Boulazac Basket Dordogne of the LNB Pro A. Yarou averaged 13.9 points, 8.3 rebounds, and 1.3 assists per game. On 6 October 2021 he signed with Nanterre 92. Yarou parted ways with the team on October 30, after averaging 6.3 points and 4.3 rebounds per game.

On 2 November 2021 he signed with ESSM Le Portel.

== See also ==
- List of foreign basketball players in Serbia
