= Mehmet Yağmur =

Turkish basketball player

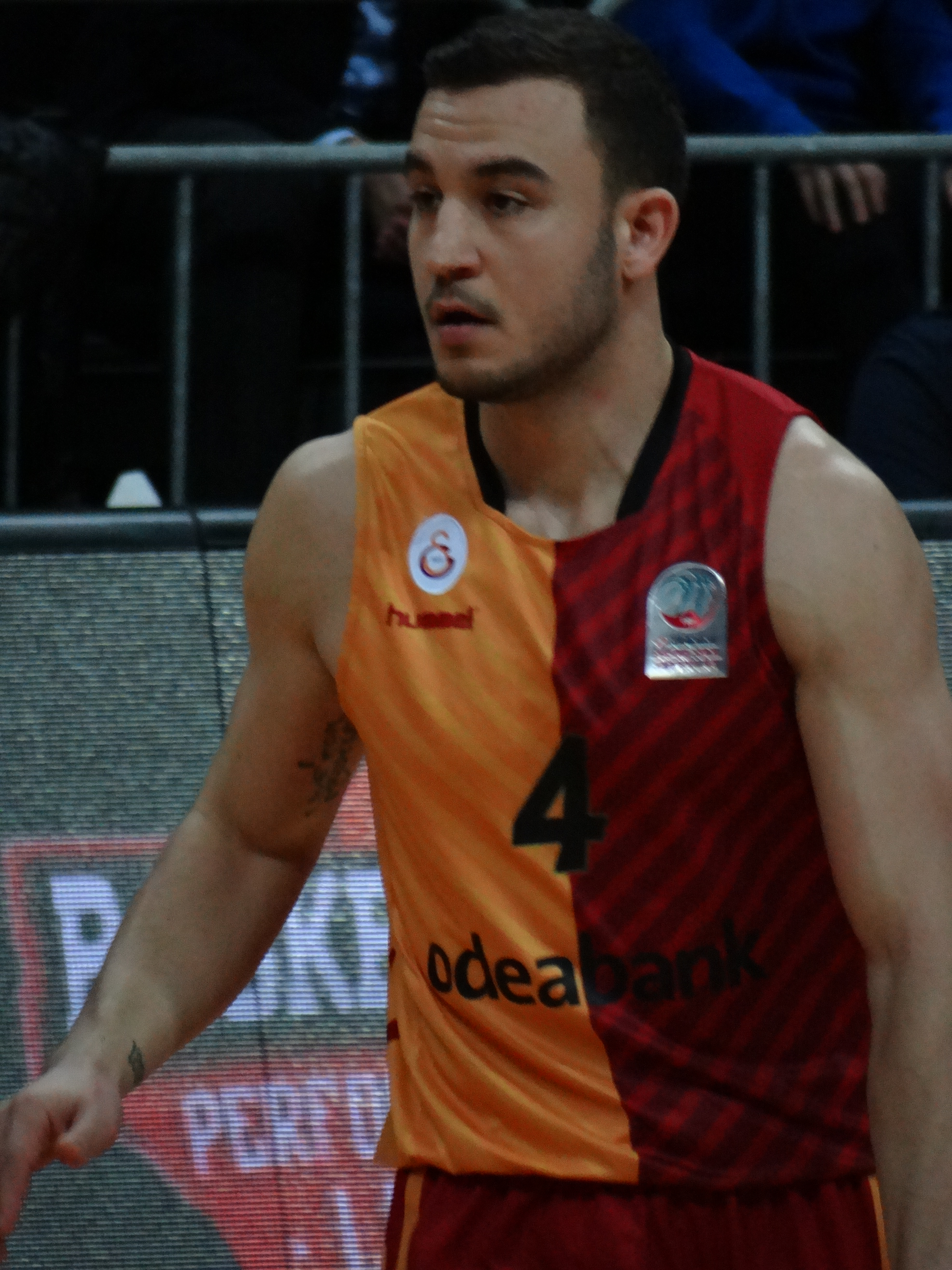
- Yağmur in 2018.

Free Agent
- Position: Point guard

Personal information
- Born: 1 July 1987 (age 39) İzmir, Turkey
- Listed height: 6 ft 1.5 in (1.87 m)
- Listed weight: 187 lb (85 kg)

Career information
- NBA draft: 2009: undrafted
- Playing career: 2003–present

Career history
- 2003–2007: Pınar Karşıyaka
- 2007–2009: Beşiktaş
- 2009–2010: Tofaş
- 2010–2011: Türk Telekom
- 2011–2012: Beşiktaş
- 2012–2013: Olin Edirne
- 2013–2014: Beşiktaş
- 2014–2017: Darüşşafaka
- 2017–2018: Galatasaray
- 2018–2019: İstanbul BŞB
- 2019–2020: Sigortam.net İTÜ BB
- 2020–2022: Beşiktaş
- 2022–2024: Türk Telekom
- 2024–2025: Manisa Basket

Career highlights
- EuroChallenge champion (2012); Turkish League champion (2012); Turkish Cup winner (2012)
Medals
Representing Turkey
FIBA Europe Under-18 Championship
Silver medal – second place	2005 Serbia & Montenegro	U-18 Team
Silver medal – second place	2004 Spain	U-18 Team

Mehmet Yağmur (born 1 July 1987) is a Turkish professional basketball player who last played for Manisa Basket of the Basketbol Süper Ligi (BSL). He plays at the point guard position.

== Professional career ==
Yagmur averaged 6.7 points, 4.4 assists and 1.6 steals per game for Sigortam.net İTÜ Basket during the 2019-20 season. He signed with Besiktas on 25 September 2020.

On 19 September 2022 he signed with Türk Telekom of the Turkish Basketbol Süper Ligi (BSL).

On August 24, 2024, he signed with Manisa Basket of the Basketbol Süper Ligi (BSL).

== Personal ==
Yağmur studied at Ege University.

== Career statistics ==
Legend
GP	Games played	GS	Games started	MPG	Minutes per game
FG%	Field-goal percentage	3P%	3-point field-goal percentage	FT%	Free-throw percentage
RPG	Rebounds per game	APG	Assists per game	SPG	Steals per game
BPG	Blocks per game	PPG	Points per game	PIR	Performance index rating
**Bold**	Career high

=== EuroLeague ===
Year	Team	GP	GS	MPG	FG%	3P%	FT%	RPG	APG	SPG	BPG	PPG	PIR
2015–16	Darüşşafaka	13	10	13.9	.453	.308	.556	1.0	1.6	.4	.1	4.7	3.8
2016–17	Darüşşafaka	12	3	2.3	.000	.200	.000	.1	.3	.1	.0	0.3	-.8
Career		13	10	13.9	.453	.308	.556	1.0	1.6	.4	.1	4.7	3.8
