= Kennedy Winston =

American professional basketball player (born 1984)

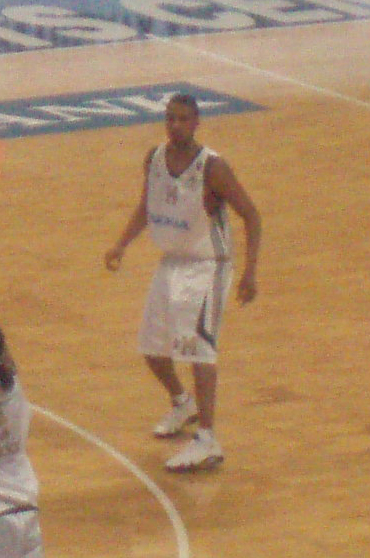

Personal information
- Born: July 29, 1984 (age 42) Prichard, Alabama, U.S.
- Listed height: 6 ft 6 in (1.98 m)
- Listed weight: 230 lb (104 kg)

Career information
- High school: Mattie T. Blount (Prichard, Alabama)
- College: Alabama (2002–2005)
- NBA draft: 2005: undrafted
- Playing career: 2005–2018
- Position: Shooting guard / Small forward

Career history
- 2005–2006: Gran Canaria
- 2006–2007: Panionios
- 2007–2008: Panathinaikos
- 2008–2009: Türk Telekom
- 2009: Real Madrid
- 2009–2010: Lottomatica Roma
- 2010–2011: Virtus Bologna
- 2011–2012: Telenet Oostende
- 2013: BCM Gravelines
- 2013: Amchit Club
- 2014: Olympique Antibes
- 2014–2015: Halcones de Xalapa
- 2015: Club Malvín
- 2015: Guaiqueríes de Margarita
- 2015–2016: Club Malvín
- 2016: Club Atlético Peñarol

Career highlights
- Greek League champion (2008); Greek Cup winner (2008); All-Greek League Second Team (2007); LUB champion (2015); LUB Finals MVP (2015); FIBA EuroCup All-Star Day (2007); GBL All Star (2007); 2× First-team All-SEC (2004–2005); Fourth-team Parade All-American (2002); Alabama Mr. Basketball (2002)

Kennedy Lawrence Winston (born July 29, 1984) is an American-Macedonian former professional basketball player. He is a former college basketball player with the University of Alabama. Kennedy left college one year early to pursue his dreams of playing in the NBA. He was not drafted by an NBA team in 2005, and he spent the majority of his career overseas.

== College career ==
Winston was a basketball star at Mattie T. Blount High School in Prichard, Alabama, where he won the Alabama Mr. Basketball award and was Gatorade's state Player Of The Year his senior year in 2002. He originally signed a letter of intent to play at the University of California, but decided he needed to be closer to his ill mother. After the University of California granted him his release, he signed with the University of Alabama. He was the top scorer with the University of Alabama's Crimson Tide for two seasons and he led the SEC conference in scoring in 2005, averaging 17.9 points per game. He was also a 2-time All-SEC first team player in both 2004 and 2005. He led his team to the NCAA tournament in both 2004 and 2005, advancing as far as the Elite Eight in one of the years.

== Professional career ==
Winston declared for the 2005 NBA draft after his junior year, and was expected to go somewhere in the middle of the first round. But to the shock & surprise of Winston and his supporters, he wasn't drafted. Winston worked out as an undrafted free agent for some NBA teams but eventually went to Europe to play pro ball. He played an important role for his team Panionios in the Greek League 2006–07 season, as he was the team's first scorer, averaging 14.9 points per game, plus 3.2 rebounds, 2 assists, 1.2 steals and 2.3 turnovers per game in 32.3 minutes per game. He was the team's co-MVP that season, along with teammate Stratos Perperoglou, and at the end of the season they both landed contracts with the Greek power Panathinaikos.

In his first season with Panathinaikos, Winston averaged 8 points per game and 3.1 rebounds per game in 19 minutes per game in the Greek League. In the 2007–08 Greek League post season, in 10 games, he averaged 5.9 points per game and 2.6 rebounds per game in 16.2 minutes of play. He drew the media's attention on February 17, 2008, after scoring 26 points with 7–8 3-pointers made against Panathinaikos' archrivals Olympiacos Piraeus. With Panathinaikos he won both the Greek League and the Greek Cup titles that season.

On July 30, 2008, Winston signed with Türk Telekom of Turkey. He left them in February 2009, and signed with Real Madrid for the rest of the season.

In August 2009, he signed with Lottomatica Roma of the Italian Lega Basket Serie A for the 2009–10 season. In August 2010 he signed a one-year contract for the 2010–11 season with Virtus Bologna. In November 2011, he signed a six-week contract with Telenet Oostende. After contract expired he extended his contract till the end of the season.

On December 27, 2012, he signed with BCM Gravelines of France for the rest of the 2012–13 season. In August 2013, he signed a one-year deal with Grissin Bon Reggio Emilia. Only 5 days later he was waived, because of some physical problems. In September 2013, he signed with Amchit Club of Lebanon. In January 2014, he returned to France and signed with Olympique Antibes for the rest of the season.

On November 26, 2014, Winston signed with Halcones de Xalapa of Mexico. In January 2015, he left the Mexican team and signed with Club Malvín of Uruguay. He helped his team to win the 2015 Uruguayan championship. In May 2015, he signed with Guaiqueríes de Margarita of Venezuela for the rest of the 2015 LPB season.

== Legal Issues ==
On September 10 2025, it was reported that Winston was arrested by federal authorities and charged with running what investigators called a "high-quality" fraud scheme. Winston and several others used forged drivers licenses & other stolen ID, and stolen personal information to forge and cash stolen checks (including IRS refunds and disaster relief payments) at various locations. Over $1 million in total losses were reported, according to federal investigators. Winston has pled not guilty to the charges, and at present time the investigation is continuing.
