= Arvydas Eitutavičius =

Lithuanian basketball player (born 1982)

Personal information
- Born: 18 September 1982 (age 44) Klaipėda, Lithuanian SSR, Soviet Union
- Listed height: 1.88 m (6 ft 2 in)
- Listed weight: 82 kg (181 lb)

Career information
- High school: Norfolk Collegiate School (Norfolk, Virginia); Laurinburg Institute (Laurinburg, North Carolina)
- College: American (2003–2007)
- NBA draft: 2007: undrafted
- Playing career: 2007–2019
- Position: Point guard

Career history
- 2007: Ciudad Real
- 2007–2008: CB Tíjola
- 2008–2009: Neptūnas Klaipėda
- 2009–2010: Cholet Basket
- 2010–2011: Iraklis B.C.
- 2011–2012: BK Prostějov
- 2012: BC Khimik
- 2012–2013: Anwil Włocławek
- 2013–2014: Neptūnas Klaipėda
- 2014–2015: Anwil Włocławek
- 2015–2016: Dzūkija Alytus
- 2016-2017: BC Šilutė
- 2017-2019: BC Gargždai-SC

Career highlights
- French League champion (2010)

Arvydas Eitutavičius (born 18 September 1982) is a Lithuanian former professional basketball player who last played for BC Gargždai-SC of the National Basketball League. He attended Norfolk Collegiate School and Laurinburg Institute before enrolling to American University to play college basketball for the Eagles. Subsequently, he pursued a professional career, playing for several clubs in Europe. Eitutavičius is a point guard.

== Amateur career ==
Eitutavičius left Lithuania in 2001 to play high school basketball in the United States. He attended the Norfolk Collegiate School in Norfolk, Virginia for a year and the Laurinburg Institute in North Carolina for another year before enrolling into NCAA Division I's American University based in Washington, D.C. He saw little playing time during his freshman and sophomore years, but became the team's starting shooting guard in his junior and senior years. As a senior, he recorded 25.3 minutes, 11.6 points, 2.7 rebounds, 2.1 assists per game.

== Professional career ==
After graduation, he signed with Ciudad Real, a minor Spanish basketball team playing in Liga EBA. After starring in 24 games, Eitutavičius then played for CB Tíjola of the second-tier LEB league. There, however, he played only 2 games and recorded 12 points, 8 rebounds and 4 assists in 2 games. In 2008, he returned to his homeland and played for BC Neptūnas. He appeared in 29 games for the club, averaging 13.0 points per game, 3.9 rebounds per game, 3.1 assists per game and 1.1 steals per game in 28.8 minutes per game. The following season, he moved to Cholet Basket playing in Pro A. That season, his team won the Pro A championship and he was an important bench player for the team, averaging 6.8 points, 1.4 rebounds and 1.8 assists per game. He also debuted in Eurocup that season, averaging 9.8 points, 2.7 rebounds and 2.2 assists per game.

After the championship season, Eitutavičius signed with the Greek basketball club Iraklis. He appeared in 24 games for the club, averaging 7.5 points, 2.1 rebounds, 1.5 assists and 0.9 steals per game on 25.5 minutes per game. In the subsequent years, he moved around Eastern and Central Europe, playing in Czech Republic, Ukraine and Poland. In 2013, he once again returned to his homeland to play for BC Neptūnas. He appeared in 17 games for the club, averaging 4.1 points per game, 2.1 rebounds per game and 2.2 assists per game in 16.8 minutes per game. In August 2014 Eitutavičius returned to Anwil Włocławek.

== Lithuania national basketball team ==
Eitutavičius was a candidate to represent the Lithuania national basketball team at the 2010 FIBA World Championship. He played for the reserve team and was invited by coach Kęstutis Kemzūra to join the main roster. He, however, was released from the team one week prior to the start of the championship.
