= Bradley Buckman =

American basketball player

Personal information
- Born: January 11, 1984 (age 42) Austin, Texas, U.S.
- Listed height: 6 ft 8 in (2.03 m)
- Listed weight: 235 lb (107 kg)

Career information
- High school: Westlake (West Lake Hills, Texas)
- College: Texas (2002–2006)
- NBA draft: 2006: undrafted
- Playing career: 2006–2014
- Position: Small forward

Career history
- 2006–2007: Austin Toros
- 2008: U-Mobitelco Cluj-Napoca
- 2008: Keravnos Strovolos
- 2009: Hapoel Gilboa Galil
- 2009–2010: Kepez Belediyesi
- 2010: Fraport Skyliners
- 2011: Antalya BB
- 2011–2012: Tofaş S.K.
- 2012: Cajasol Sevilla
- 2013: Artland Dragons
- 2013–2014: Beşiktaş

Career highlights
- TBL All-Star (2012); Third-team Parade All-American (2002); McDonald's All-American (2002)

Bradley Bond Buckman (born January 11, 1984) is an American former professional basketball player.

== College career ==
After playing high school basketball at St. Michael's Academy and Westlake, in West Lake Hills, Texas, Buckman played 4 seasons of college basketball at the University of Texas at Austin, with the Texas Longhorns.

== Professional career ==
Buckman went undrafted in the 2006 NBA Draft. In November 2006 he was assigned to the Austin Toros of the NBA D-League.

In January 2008, he signed with the Romanian team U-Mobitelco Cluj-Napoca.

He started the 2008–09 season in Cyprus with Keravnos Strovolos, but was released in December 2008. In January 2009 he moved to Israel and signed with Hapoel Gilboa Galil for the rest of the season. For the 2009–10 season he signed with Kepez Belediyesi of Turkey.

In September 2010, he signed a short–term deal with the German team Fraport Skyliners. He left Skyliners in October 2010. In January 2011, he moved to Turkey and signed with Antalya BB for the remainder of the season. In June 2011, he signed a one–year deal with another Turkish team Tofaş S.K.

In August 2012, he signed a one-year deal with the Spanish team Cajasol Sevilla. In December 2012, he parted ways with Sevilla. In January 2013, he moved to Germany and signed with Artland Dragons for the rest of the season.

In July 2013, he signed a one-year deal with the Turkish team Beşiktaş.

== Life after basketball ==
In 2015, Buckman joined AQUILA Commercial, an Austin-based full services commercial real estate firm, as a tenant representation broker.

Brad is currently the Director of Sales at Crazy Mountain Ranch.

== Personal life ==
Buckman is married to former Survivor contestant Alexis Jones.
