= Billy Keys =

American basketball player

Personal information
- Born: October 26, 1977 (age 49) Chicago, Illinois, U.S.
- Listed height: 6 ft 2 in (1.88 m)
- Listed weight: 210 lb (95 kg)

Career information
- High school: Hugh Manley (Chicago, Illinois)
- College: Northeastern Illinois (1995–1998); New Mexico State (1998–2000)
- NBA draft: 2000: undrafted
- Playing career: 2000–2014
- Position: Point guard
- Coaching career: 2014–present

Career history

Playing
- 2000–2001: New Mexico Slam
- 2001: Grindavík
- 2001: Florida Sea Dragons
- 2001–2002: Fargo-Moorhead Beez
- 2002: Cocodrilos de Caracas
- 2002–2003: Hapoel Tel Aviv
- 2003–2004: Roseto
- 2004: Dakota Wizards
- 2004: Cocodrilos de Caracas
- 2004–2005: Dakota Wizards
- 2005: Gran Canaria
- 2005–2006: Zaragoza
- 2006–2007: Varese
- 2007–2008: AEL 1964
- 2008–2010: Maroussi
- 2010–2011: Budivelnyk
- 2011–2013: Panionios
- 2013–2014: Nilan Bisons

Coaching
- 2014–2015: Centennial HS (assistant)
- 2015–2019: Mayfield HS
- 2019–present: Northern New Mexico College (assistant)

Career highlights
- CBA champion (2004)

William Amar Keys (born October 26, 1977) is an American former professional basketball player and basketball coach. At a height of 6 ft 2 in (1.88 m) and a weight of 210 pounds (95 kg), he played at the point guard position. He currently is a men's basketball assistant coach at Northern New Mexico College in Espanola, New Mexico.

== College career ==
After playing high school basketball at Hugh Manley High School in Chicago, Illinois, Keys played college basketball at Northeastern Illinois University, with the Northeastern Illinois Golden Eagles, from 1995 to 1998, and at New Mexico State University, with the New Mexico State Aggies, from 1998 to 2000. He was named to the 1999–00 season's All-Big West Conference First Team.

== Professional career ==
In February 2001, Keys signed with Grindavík of the Icelandic Úrvalsdeild karla. In his debut, he scored a season high 47 points along with 18 rebounds and 7 assists. In three regular season games, he averaged 38.7 points, 12.7 rebounds and 5.7 assists. In the playoffs, Grindavík lost to Tindastóll, 1–2, in the first round with Keys averaging 26.0 points, 4.0 rebounds and 3.0 assists.

Keys played with the Miami Heat during their 2002–03 NBA season training camp, but he did not play in any official NBA games with the club. He then played with the New York Knicks' NBA Summer League team, in the summer of 2003. Keys then won the 2004 CBA championship with the Dakota Wizards.

In the summer of 2004, he played with the NBA Summer League teams of both the Detroit Pistons and the Denver Nuggets. He then played with Nuggets during their 2004–05 NBA season training camp, but he did not play in any official NBA games with the club. He next played with the NBA Summer League teams of both the Portland Trail Blazers and the Houston Rockets, in the summer of 2005.

Keys also played in the three major European national domestic basketball leagues, the Italian LBA League, the Spanish ACB League, and the Greek Basket League. In 2009, he extended his contract with the EuroLeague club Maroussi. He retired from playing professional basketball in 2014.

== Coaching career ==
Keys began his basketball coaching career in 2014, when he became an assistant coach at Centennial High School, in Las Cruces, New Mexico. He then became the head coach at Mayfield High School, in Las Cruces, New Mexico, in 2015.
