= Jared Homan =

American professional basketball player (born 1983)

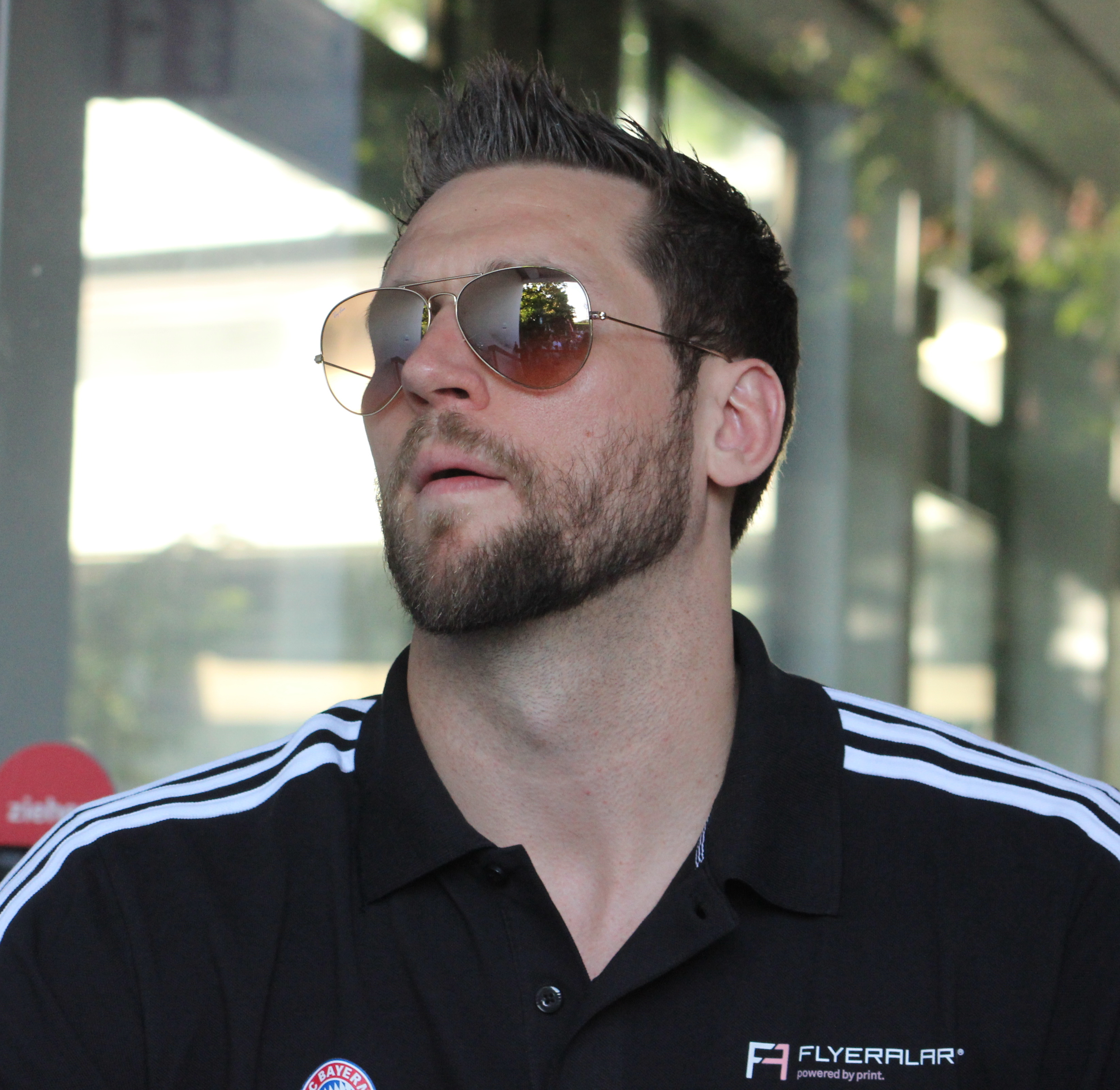
- Homan with Bayern Munich

Free agent
- Position: Power forward / center

Personal information
- Born: March 6, 1983 (age 43) Remsen, Iowa
- Listed height: 6 ft 10 in (2.08 m)
- Listed weight: 250 lb (113 kg)

Career information
- High school: St. Mary's (Remsen, Iowa)
- College: Iowa State (2001–2005)
- NBA draft: 2005: undrafted
- Playing career: 2005–present

Career history
- 2005–2006: Maroussi
- 2006: Daegu Orions
- 2006–2007: Mersin BB
- 2007–2008: Śląsk Wrocław
- 2008–2009: Cibona Zagreb
- 2009–2010: Maroussi
- 2010–2011: Virtus Bologna
- 2011–2013: Bayern Munich
- 2013–2014: Spartak Saint Petersburg
- 2014–2015: NSK Eskişehir
- 2016: Maccabi Ashdod

Career highlights
- Croatian League champion (2009); Croatian Cup champion (2009); Polish League All-Star (2008)

Jared William Homan (born March 6, 1983) is an American professional basketball player who last played for Maccabi Ashdod of the Israeli Premier League. His natural position is power forward, but he is also a center.

== Player profile ==
A pre-draft review of Homan stated: "Jared Homan isn't quite a household name yet, but he has a very intriguing package of size, skill, and mentality that has certainly piqued the interest of NBA scouts. Playing in a college basketball conference known for its rugged, physical play, Homan threw his body around with the best of them. He is noted for never passing or passing up a shot and for not backing down."

== Professional career ==
Homan signed with the Greek League club Maroussi in 2009. In July 2010, he signed with Virtus Bologna. In November 2011, he signed with Bayern Munich after he was waived by Virtus Bologna because he allegedly punched the coach. In September 2013, he signed a one-year deal with Spartak Saint Petersburg.

In October 2014, he signed with Eskişehir Basket of Turkey.

== National team career ==
Homan was a member of the senior men's Bulgarian national basketball team.

== Career stats ==
Season	League	Club	GP	Min	Pts
2001–02	(United States) NCAA	Iowa State	31	16.6	3.6
2002–03	(United States) NCAA	Iowa State	31	26.9	7.5
2003–04	(United States) NCAA	Iowa State	32	28.1	11.1
2004–05	(United States) NCAA	Iowa State	31	36.3	13.6
2005–06	(Greece) Greek League	Maroussi	26	19	7
2007–08	(Europe) FIBA EuroChallenge	ASCO Wroclaw	12	24.9	17.7

Source: – See For Comprehensive Stats
