= 2019–20 Aris Thessaloniki B.C. season =

Aris Thessaloniki
2019–20 season
- Head coach: Soulis Markopoulos (until 9/12/2019); Savvas Kamperidis (since 12/12/2019)
- Arena: Nick Galis Hall
- Basket League: 13th
- Greek Cup: Phase 2
Home	Away

The 2019–20 season was the 66th appearance in the top-tier level Greek Basket League for Aris Thessaloniki. The season and ended prematurely in March 2020, due to the COVID-19 pandemic. Aris Thessaloniki was in the 13th place and was going to be relegated. On 21 May 2020, after a vote that was held between the league's 14 teams, Panathinaikos OPAP was crowned the league's champion and none of the teams would be relegated.

The club also competed in the Greek Basketball Cup and eliminated by Iraklis in Phase 2. The game held in Nick Galis Hall.

Aris Thessaloniki started the season with Soulis Markopoulos as its manager. After the lost league game against Panionios Su Casa, Soulis Markopoulos resigned and Aris Thessaloniki signed with Savvas Kamperidis

== First-team squad ==
#	Name	Nationality	Position(s)	Height	Date of birth (age)
1	Toarlyn Fitzpatrick	(United States)	PF / C	2.06 m	September 4, 1989 (aged 30)
2	Ken Brown	(United States)	PG	1.80 m	October 26, 1989 (aged 30)
4	Lefteris Bochoridis	(Greece)	PG / SG	1.96 m	April 18, 1994 (aged 25)
5	Kostas Vlasios	(Greece)	PG / SG	1.90 m	June 5, 2001 (aged 18)
7	Dimitris Flionis	(Greece)	PG / SG	1.90 m	April 8, 1997 (aged 22)
8	Milan Milošević	(Bosnia and Herzegovina)	PF / SF	2.05 m	September 26, 1985 (aged 34)
10	Giannis Sidiroilias	(Greece)	SF	2.01 m	October 29, 2001 (aged 18)
11	Chrysostomos Sandramanis	(Greece)	PG / SG	1.96 m	April 5, 2000 (aged 19)
13	Martynas Gecevičius	(Lithuania)	SF	2.01 m	May 16, 1988 (aged 31)
14	Georgios Georgakis	(Greece)	C	2.05 m	March 18, 1991 (aged 29)
15	Diamantis Slaftsakis	(Greece)	SF / PF	2.02 m	July 27, 1994 (aged 25)
16	Omiros Netzipoglou	(Greece)	SG	1.93 m	November 18, 2002 (aged 17)
18	Vladimir Dragičević	(Montenegro)	PF / C	2.06 m	May 30, 1986 (aged 33)
30	Jaylen Morris	(United States)	SG	1.96 m	September 19, 1995 (aged 24)
32	Stratos Voulgaropoulos	(Greece)	C	2.18 m	October 31, 2000 (aged 19)

=== Roster changes ===
==== In ====
Position(s)	#	Player	Moving from	Ref.
PF / C	1	(United States) Toarlyn Fitzpatrick	(France) ESSM Le Portel	
SF	2	(United States) Ken Brown	(Lithuania) Lietkabelis Panevėžys	
SG / PG	11	(Greece) Chrysostomos Sandramanis	(Greece) AS Karditsas	
C	14	(Greece) Georgios Georgakis	Free Agent	

==== Out ====
Position(s)	#	Player	Moving to	Ref.
C	14	(Serbia) Đorđe Gagić	(Bosnia and Herzegovina) Igokea	
PG	11	(United States) Gary Talton	Free Agent	
SG / PG	9	(Greece) Vangelis Sakellariou	Free Agent	

== Competitions ==
=== Overall ===
Competition	Started round	Current position / round	Final position / round	First match	Last match
Greek Basket League	Matchday 1	—	13th	29 September 2019	7 March 2020
Greek Basketball Cup	Phase 2	—	Phase 2	2 October 2019	2 October 2019

Updated to match played 7 March 2020
Source: Competitions

=== Overview ===
Competition	Record							
Competition	Pld	W	D	L	PF	PA	PD	Win %
Greek Basket League	20	6	0	14	1,548	1,648	−100	30.00
Greek Basketball Cup	1	0	0	1	63	64	−1	0.00
Total	21	6	0	15	1,611	1,712	−101	28.57

Last updated: 7 March 2020
Source: Competitions

==== Manager's Overview ====
===== Soulis Markopoulos =====
Competition	Record							
Competition	Pld	W	D	L	PF	PA	PD	Win %
Greek Basket League	10	2	0	8	746	828	−82	20.00
Greek Basketball Cup	1	0	0	1	63	64	−1	0.00
Total	11	2	0	9	809	892	−83	18.18

Source: Competitions

===== Savvas Kamperidis =====
Competition	Record							
Competition	Pld	W	D	L	PF	PA	PD	Win %
Greek Basket League	10	4	0	6	802	820	−18	40.00
Greek Basketball Cup	0	0	0	0	0	0	+0	—
Total	10	4	0	6	802	820	−18	40.00

Source: Competitions

=== Greek Basket League ===
==== Regular season ====
===== Standings =====
Pos	Team	Pld	W	L	PF	PA	PD	Pts	Qualification or relegation
1	Panathinaikos OPAP (C)	20	18	2	2075	1537	+538	38	Already qualified to EuroLeague
2	AEK Athens	20	16	4	1653	1493	+160	36	Qualification to Champions League
3	Peristeri Winmasters	20	13	7	1559	1434	+125	33	Qualification to Champions League
4	Promitheas Patras	19	12	7	1449	1436	+13	31	Qualification to EuroCup
5	Ifaistos Limnou	20	11	9	1436	1435	+1	31	
6	Lavrio Megabolt	20	11	9	1523	1597	−74	31	
7	Iraklis	20	9	11	1557	1550	+7	29	Qualification to Champions League qualifying rounds
8	Larisa	20	8	12	1524	1676	−152	28	
9	Kolossos H Hotels	20	8	12	1578	1602	−24	28	
10	Ionikos Nikaias Affidea	20	8	12	1570	1709	−139	28	
11	Rethymno Cretan Kings	19	8	11	1319	1376	−57	27	
12	Panionios Su Casa	20	6	14	1469	1707	−238	26	
13	Aris Thessaloniki (Note: On 21 May 2020, the league agreed there was no relegation to the 2020–21 Greek A2 Basket League for the 13th and 14th team this season.)	20	6	14	1548	1648	−100	26	
14	PAOK	20	5	15	1635	1695	−60	25	

Updated to match(es) played on 8 March 2020. Source: ESAKE
(C) Champions

===== Results overview =====
Opposition	Home score	Away score	Double
AEK Athens	Canceled	79–92	
Ifaistos Limnou	88–77	59–85	147–162
Ionikos Nikaias Affidea	72–77	65–72	137–149
Iraklis	69–63	66–82	135–145
Kolossos H Hotels	85–87	86–90	171–177
Larisa	90–72	78–92	168–164
Lavrio Megabolt	81–70	Canceled	
Panathinaikos OPAP	81–88	86–108	167–196
Panionios Su Casa	80–86	Canceled	
PAOK	85–82	84–101	169–183
Peristeri Winmasters	72–59	Canceled	
Promitheas Patras	Canceled	79–95	
Rethymno Cretan Kings	Canceled	63–70	

===== Matches =====
29 September 2019 1	Aris Thessaloniki	85–82(OT)	PAOK	Thessaloniki
17:45	Scoring by quarter: 14–16, 25–12, 13–20, 18–22, Overtime: 15–12
ERT	Pts: Lefteris Bochoridis 24; Rebs: Vladimir Dragičević 8 Asts: Lefteris Bochoridis 7		Pts: Adam Smith 28; Rebs: Antwaine Wiggins 9 Asts: JeQuan Lewis 5	Arena: Nick Galis Hall

5 October 2019 2	Iraklis	82–66	Aris Thessaloniki	Thessaloniki
18:15	Scoring by quarter: 22–15, 15–10, 27–22, 18–19
ERT	Pts: Olivier Hanlan, Darrius Garrett 17; Rebs: Darrius Garrett 15; Asts: Jamal Shuler 6		Pts: Jaylen Morris 23; Rebs: Jaylen Morris, Vladimir Dragičević 7 Asts: Dimitris Flionis, Martynas Gecevičius 5	Arena: Ivanofeio Sports Arena

13 October 2019 3	Larisa	92–78	Aris Thessaloniki	Larissa
18:00	Scoring by quarter: 21–24, 23–21, 27–21, 21–12
ERT	Pts: Scottie Reynolds 17; Rebs: Terell Parks 15; Asts: Scottie Reynolds 13		Pts: Milan Milošević 23; Rebs: Vladimir Dragičević 11; Asts: Martynas Gecevičius 8	Arena: Larissa Neapolis Indoor Arena

19 October 2019 4	Aris Thessaloniki	72–77	Ionikos Nikaias Affidea	Thessaloniki
15:45	Scoring by quarter: 21–24, 23–19, 16–18, 12–16
ERT	Pts: Vladimir Dragičević 17; Rebs: Milan Milošević 6 Asts: Martynas Gecevičius 6		Pts: Steve Burtt 24; Rebs: Loukas Mavrokefalidis 8 Asts: (3 players) 3	Arena: Nick Galis Hall

26 October 2019 5	Panathinaikos OPAP	108–86	Aris Thessaloniki	Athens
19:00	Scoring by quarter: 21–24, 23–21, 27–21, 21–12
COSMOTE SPORT	Pts: Jimmer Fredette 21; Rebs: Dinos Mitoglou 6 Asts: Wesley Johnson, Nick Calathes 5		Pts: Martynas Gecevičius 23; Rebs: Vladimir Dragičević 7 Asts: Gary Talton, Martynas Gecevičius 7	Arena: O.A.C.A. Olympic Indoor Hall

2 November 2019 6	Aris Thessaloniki	85–87(OT)	Kolossos H Hotels	Thessaloniki
15:45	Scoring by quarter: 19–18, 10–18, 20–14, 22–21, Overtime: 14–16
ERT	Pts: Jaylen Morris 20; Rebs: Jaylen Morris 11; Asts: Gary Talton 6		Pts: Tyrone Brazelton, Lasan Kromah 18; Rebs: Danny Agbelese 8 Asts: Tyrone Brazelton 6	Arena: Nick Galis Hall

16 November 2019 7	Ifaistos Limnou	85–59	Aris Thessaloniki	Lemnos
15:45	Scoring by quarter: 16–11, 23–16, 21–16, 25–16
ERT	Pts: Mario Little 21; Rebs: Sean Evans 10; Asts: Spyros Mourtos 4		Pts: Milan Milošević 16; Rebs: Vladimir Dragičević 6 Asts: Milan Milošević 3	Arena: Kleisto Gimnastirio Limnou "Nikos Samaras"

24 November 2019 8	Aris Thessaloniki	72–59	Peristeri Winmasters	Thessaloniki
17:00	Scoring by quarter: 19–14, 20–21, 19–13, 14–11
ERT	Pts: Lefteris Bochoridis 27; Rebs: Milan Milošević 11; Asts: Lefteris Bochoridis, Vladimir Dragičević 4		Pts: Brayon Blake 10; Rebs: Yanick Moreira 5 Asts: Vassilis Xanthopoulos, Steven Gray 3	Arena: Nick Galis Hall

30 November 2019 9	Rethymno Cretan Kings	70–63	Aris Thessaloniki	Rethymno
16:15	Scoring by quarter: 17–15, 19–19, 23–16, 11–13
ERT	Pts: Conner Frankamp 26; Rebs: Wesley Gordon 10; Asts: Antreas Christodoulou, Conner Frankamp 3		Pts: Lefteris Bochoridis 15; Rebs: Milan Milošević 9 Asts: Ken Brown 5	Arena: Melina Merkouri Indoor Hall

8 December 2019 10	Aris Thessaloniki	80–86	Panionios Su Casa	Thessaloniki
17:00	Scoring by quarter: 20–19, 27–30, 12–19, 21–18
ERT	Pts: Toarlyn Fitzpatrick 14; Rebs: Vladimir Dragičević 9 Asts: Ken Brown, Martynas Gecevičius 4		Pts: Dimitrios Verginis 21; Rebs: Anthony Lee 10; Asts: Dimitrios Verginis, Muhamed Pašalić 5	Arena: Nick Galis Hall

13 December 2019 11	AEK Athens	92–79	Aris Thessaloniki	Athens
19:00	Scoring by quarter: 19–15, 21–23, 26–16, 26–25
COSMOTE SPORT	Pts: Keith Langford, Howard Sant-Roos 19; Rebs: Howard Sant-Roos 12; Asts: Nikos Gkikas 5		Pts: Vladimir Dragičević 21; Rebs: Vladimir Dragičević 11; Asts: Vladimir Dragičević 9	Arena: O.A.C.A. Olympic Indoor Hall

21 December 2019 12	Aris Thessaloniki	81–70	Lavrio Megabolt	Thessaloniki
15:45	Scoring by quarter: 21–18, 15–13, 26–12, 19–27
ERT	Pts: Lefteris Bochoridis 20; Rebs: Lefteris Bochoridis, Milan Milošević 8 Asts: Milan Milošević, Martynas Gecevičius 4		Pts: Kyle Allman, Vassilis Mouratos 12; Rebs: Petros Geromichalos 7 Asts: Vassilis Mouratos 5	Arena: Nick Galis Hall

28 December 2019 13	Promitheas Patras	95–79	Aris Thessaloniki	Patras
15:45	Scoring by quarter: 30–17, 19–22, 22–19, 24–21
ERT	Pts: Oleksandr Lypovyy 18; Rebs: Oleksandr Lypovyy 6 Asts: Oleksandr Lypovyy 5		Pts: Jaylen Morris 19; Rebs: Milan Milošević, Diamantis Slaftsakis 5 Asts: Lefteris Bochoridis, Martynas Gecevičius 3	Arena: Dimitris Tofalos Arena

5 January 2020 14	PAOK	101–84	Aris Thessaloniki	Thessaloniki
17:45	Scoring by quarter: 32–24, 25–23, 21–16, 23–21
ERT	Pts: Adam Smith 26; Rebs: Antwaine Wiggins 10; Asts: (3 players) 3		Pts: Vladimir Dragičević 19; Rebs: Milan Milošević 9 Asts: Lefteris Bochoridis, Martynas Gecevičius 5	Arena: P.A.O.K. Sports Arena

11 January 2020 15	Aris Thessaloniki	69–63	Iraklis	Thessaloniki
17:45	Scoring by quarter: 9–18, 20–14, 22–10, 18–21
ERT	Pts: Lefteris Bochoridis 16; Rebs: Jaylen Morris 10; Asts: Jaylen Morris 4		Pts: Olivier Hanlan 16; Rebs: Vassilis Kavvadas 12; Asts: Olivier Hanlan 5	Arena: Nick Galis Hall

18 January 2020 16	Aris Thessaloniki	90–72	Larisa	Thessaloniki
15:45	Scoring by quarter: 23–8, 20–21, 27–17, 20–26
ERT	Pts: Vladimir Dragičević 22; Rebs: Milan Milošević 8 Asts: (3 players) 4		Pts: Anthony Hickey 16; Rebs: Jehyve Floyd 10; Asts: Anthony Hickey, Brandon Rush 3	Arena: Nick Galis Hall

26 January 2020 17	Ionikos Nikaias Affidea	72–65	Aris Thessaloniki	Athens
19:00	Scoring by quarter: 14–14, 20–22, 19–14, 19–15
ERT	Pts: Ioannis Dimakos 19; Rebs: Lucky Jones 8 Asts: Vincent Simpson 5		Pts: Ken Brown 23; Rebs: Diamantis Slaftsakis 9 Asts: Lefteris Bochoridis 7	Arena: Sofia Befon Palaio Faliro Indoor Hall

15 February 2020 18	Aris Thessaloniki	81–88	Panathinaikos OPAP	Thessaloniki
17:00	Scoring by quarter: 23–29, 19–18, 20–27, 19–14
ERT	Pts: Vladimir Dragičević 19; Rebs: Milan Milošević 14; Asts: Lefteris Bochoridis 8		Pts: Ioannis Papapetrou 21; Rebs: Georgios Papagiannis 12; Asts: Jimmer Fredette 4	Arena: Nick Galis Hall

29 February 2020 19	Kolossos H Hotels	90–86	Aris Thessaloniki	Rhodes
15:30	Scoring by quarter: 17–17, 20–26, 15–18, 38–25
ERT	Pts: Jermaine Love 23; Rebs: (4 players) 3 Asts: Malcolm Griffin, Jermaine Love 7		Pts: Lefteris Bochoridis 24; Rebs: Lefteris Bochoridis 9 Asts: Lefteris Bochoridis 10	Arena: Kallithea Palais des Sports

7 March 2020 20	Aris Thessaloniki	88–77	Ifaistos Limnou	Thessaloniki
15:30	Scoring by quarter: 24–11, 18–10, 21–31, 25–25
ERT	Pts: Ken Brown 22; Rebs: Vladimir Dragičević 14; Asts: Lefteris Bochoridis 7		Pts: Jerry Smith, Marcus Gilbert 18; Rebs: Sean Evans 8 Asts: Jerry Smith 4	Arena: Nick Galis Hall

14 March 2020 21	Peristeri Winmasters	Canceled	Aris Thessaloniki	Athens
00:00
				Arena: Peristeri Indoor Hall Andreas Papandreou

22 March 2020 22	Aris Thessaloniki	Canceled	Rethymno Cretan Kings	Thessaloniki
00:00
				Arena: Nick Galis Hall

28 March 2020 23	Panionios Su Casa	Canceled	Aris Thessaloniki	Athens
00:00
				Arena: Sofia Befon Palaio Faliro Indoor Hall

4 April 2020 24	Aris Thessaloniki	Canceled	AEK Athens	Thessaloniki
00:00
				Arena: Nick Galis Hall

11 April 2020 25	Lavrio Megabolt	Canceled	Aris Thessaloniki	Lavrio
00:00
				Arena: Lavrio Indoor Hall

15 April 2020 26	Aris Thessaloniki	Canceled	Promitheas Patras	Thessaloniki
00:00
				Arena: Nick Galis Hall

=== Greek Cup ===
==== Phase 2 ====
2 October 2019 Phase 2	Aris Thessaloniki	63–64	Iraklis	Thessaloniki
17:00	Scoring by quarter: 14-14, 20-13, 15-14, 14-23
	Pts: Vladimir Dragičević 19; Rebs: Lefteris Bochoridis 11; Asts: Lefteris Bochoridis 3		Pts: Olivier Hanlan 25; Rebs: Alex Davis 8 Asts: Olivier Hanlan, Teddy Okereafor 2	Arena: Nick Galis Hall

== Players' statistics ==
=== Total Statistics ===
#	Player	GP	PTS	PPG	TR	RPG	DR	OR	AST	APG	STL	SPG	BLK	BPG
1	(United States) Toarlyn Fitzpatrick	13	80	6.15	43	3.31	33	10	8	0.62	6	0.46	5	0.38
2	(United States) Ken Brown	11	151	13.73	14	1.27	11	3	35	3.18	9	0.82	1	0.09
4	(Greece) Lefteris Bochoridis	15	220	14.67	83	5.53	65	18	68	4.53	17	1.13	10	0.67
5	(Greece) Kostas Vlasios	6	3	0.50	1	0.17	0	1	0	0.00	1	0.17	0	0.00
7	(Greece) Dimitris Flionis	20	80	4.00	42	2.10	35	7	42	2.10	18	0.90	2	0.10
8	(Bosnia and Herzegovina) Milan Milošević	21	193	9.19	144	6.86	109	35	26	1.24	11	0.52	1	0.05
10	(Greece) Giannis Sidiroilias	10	13	1.30	4	0.40	3	1	3	0.30	0	0.00	0	0.00
11	(Greece) Chrysostomos Sandramanis	2	0	0.00	0	0.00	0	0	0	0.00	0	0.00	0	0.00
13	(Lithuania) Martynas Gecevičius	21	180	8.57	32	1.52	23	9	61	2.90	10	0.48	1	0.05
14	(Greece) Georgios Georgakis	2	0	0.00	1	0.50	0	1	0	0.00	0	0.00	0	0.00
15	(Greece) Diamantis Slaftsakis	21	72	3.43	55	2.62	37	18	15	0.71	14	0.67	5	0.24
16	(Greece) Omiros Netzipoglou	3	2	0.67	0	0.00	0	0	0	0.00	0	0.00	0	0.00
18	(Montenegro) Vladimir Dragičević	21	305	14.52	149	7.10	97	52	45	2.14	11	0.52	14	0.67
30	(United States) Jaylen Morris	19	179	9.42	70	3.68	55	15	23	1.21	13	0.68	6	0.32
32	(Greece) Stratos Voulgaropoulos	5	4	0.80	4	0.80	3	1	0	0.00	0	0.00	0	0.00
-	(Serbia) Đorđe Gagić	7	46	6.57	23	3.29	11	12	5	0.71	5	0.71	3	0.43
-	(United States) Gary Talton	9	70	7.78	23	2.56	21	2	30	3.33	4	0.44	0	0.00
-	(Greece) Vangelis Sakellariou	7	13	1.86	9	1.29	6	3	4	0.57	2	0.29	0	0.00
	Team				2		2	0						
	Team totals	21	1611	76.71	699	33.29	511	188	365	17.38	121	5.76	48	2.29

==== Shooting ====
#	Player	GP	FTA	FTM	FT%	2PM	2PA	2P%	3PM	3PA	3P%
1	(United States) Toarlyn Fitzpatrick	13	1	2	50.00	17	39	43.59	15	42	35.71
2	(United States) Ken Brown	11	25	34	73.53	24	43	55.81	26	53	49.06
4	(Greece) Lefteris Bochoridis	15	60	79	75.95	62	107	57.94	12	40	30.00
5	(Greece) Kostas Vlasios	6	0	0	0.00	0	0	0.00	1	4	25.00
7	(Greece) Dimitris Flionis	20	7	13	53.85	17	47	36.17	13	44	29.55
8	(Bosnia and Herzegovina) Milan Milošević	21	37	64	57.81	60	126	47.62	12	43	27.91
10	(Greece) Giannis Sidiroilias	10	0	0	0.00	5	5	100.00	1	2	50.00
11	(Greece) Chrysostomos Sandramanis	2	0	0	0.00	0	0	0.00	0	0	0.00
13	(Lithuania) Martynas Gecevičius	21	38	48	79.17	11	22	50.00	40	103	38.83
14	(Greece) Georgios Georgakis	2	0	0	0.00	0	2	0.00	0	0	0.00
15	(Greece) Diamantis Slaftsakis	21	11	24	45.83	29	58	50.00	1	10	10.00
16	(Greece) Omiros Netzipoglou	3	0	0	0.00	1	2	50.00	0	1	0.00
18	(Montenegro) Vladimir Dragičević	21	45	75	60.00	130	219	59.36	0	1	0.00
30	(United States) Jaylen Morris	19	25	38	65.79	53	102	51.96	16	56	28.57
32	(Greece) Stratos Voulgaropoulos	5	4	6	66.67	0	4	0.00	0	0	0.00
-	(Serbia) Đorđe Gagić	7	16	27	59.26	15	36	41.67	0	2	0.00
-	(United States) Gary Talton	9	9	12	75.00	23	52	44.23	5	27	18.52
-	(Greece) Vangelis Sakellariou	7	1	2	50.00	0	2	0.00	4	13	30.77
	Team totals	21	279	424	65.80	447	866	51.62	146	441	33.11

Last updated: 7 March 2020
Source: Sum of the Below Tables

=== Basket League ===
#	Player	GP	PTS	PPG	TR	RPG	DR	OR	AST	APG	STL	SPG	BLK	BPG
1	(United States) Toarlyn Fitzpatrick	13	80	6.15	43	3.31	33	10	8	0.62	6	0.46	5	0.38
2	(United States) Ken Brown	11	151	13.73	14	1.27	11	3	35	3.18	9	0.82	1	0.09
4	(Greece) Lefteris Bochoridis	14	205	14.64	72	5.14	57	15	65	4.64	15	1.07	9	0.64
5	(Greece) Kostas Vlasios	6	3	0.50	1	0.17	0	1	0	0.00	1	0.17	0	0.00
7	(Greece) Dimitris Flionis	19	77	4.05	42	2.21	35	7	40	2.11	16	0.84	2	0.11
8	(Bosnia and Herzegovina) Milan Milošević	20	188	9.40	140	7.00	106	34	26	1.30	10	0.50	1	0.05
10	(Greece) Giannis Sidiroilias	10	13	1.30	4	0.40	3	1	3	0.30	0	0.00	0	0.00
11	(Greece) Chrysostomos Sandramanis	2	0	0.00	0	0.00	0	0	0	0.00	0	0.00	0	0.00
13	(Lithuania) Martynas Gecevičius	20	168	8.40	32	1.60	23	9	59	2.95	9	0.45	1	0.05
14	(Greece) Georgios Georgakis	2	0	0.00	1	0.50	0	1	0	0.00	0	0.00	0	0.00
15	(Greece) Diamantis Slaftsakis	20	70	3.50	52	2.60	35	17	14	0.70	14	0.70	5	0.25
16	(Greece) Omiros Netzipoglou	3	2	0.67	0	0.00	0	0	0	0.00	0	0.00	0	0.00
18	(Montenegro) Vladimir Dragičević	20	286	14.30	142	7.10	93	49	44	2.20	11	0.55	14	0.70
30	(United States) Jaylen Morris	18	179	9.94	70	3.89	55	15	23	1.28	13	0.72	6	0.33
32	(Greece) Stratos Voulgaropoulos	5	4	0.80	4	0.80	3	1	0	0.00	0	0.00	0	0.00
-	(Serbia) Đorđe Gagić	6	41	6.83	22	3.67	10	12	5	0.83	4	0.67	3	0.50
-	(United States) Gary Talton	8	68	8.50	20	2.50	18	2	29	3.63	4	0.50	0	0.00
-	(Greece) Vangelis Sakellariou	6	13	2.17	7	1.17	4	3	4	0.67	0	0.00	0	0.00
	Team totals	20	1548	77.40	666	33.30	486	180	355	17.75	112	5.60	47	2.35

==== Shooting ====
#	Player	GP	FTA	FTM	FT%	2PM	2PA	2P%	3PM	3PA	3P%
1	(United States) Toarlyn Fitzpatrick	13	1	2	50.00	17	39	43.59	15	42	35.71
2	(United States) Ken Brown	11	25	34	73.53	24	43	55.81	26	53	49.06
4	(Greece) Lefteris Bochoridis	14	55	71	77.46	57	95	60.00	12	39	30.77
5	(Greece) Kostas Vlasios	6	0	0	0.00	0	0	0.00	1	4	25.00
7	(Greece) Dimitris Flionis	19	6	11	54.55	16	41	39.02	13	44	29.55
8	(Bosnia and Herzegovina) Milan Milošević	20	37	64	57.81	59	122	48.36	11	40	27.50
10	(Greece) Giannis Sidiroilias	10	0	0	0.00	5	5	100.00	1	2	50.00
11	(Greece) Chrysostomos Sandramanis	2	0	0	0.00	0	0	0.00	0	0	0.00
13	(Lithuania) Martynas Gecevičius	20	34	43	79.07	10	20	50.00	38	99	38.38
14	(Greece) Georgios Georgakis	2	0	0	0.00	0	2	0.00	0	0	0.00
15	(Greece) Diamantis Slaftsakis	20	11	24	45.83	28	57	49.12	1	8	12.50
16	(Greece) Omiros Netzipoglou	3	0	0	0.00	1	2	50.00	0	1	0.00
18	(Montenegro) Vladimir Dragičević	20	44	73	60.27	121	205	59.02	0	1	0.00
30	(United States) Jaylen Morris	18	25	38	65.79	53	102	51.96	16	55	29.09
32	(Greece) Stratos Voulgaropoulos	5	4	6	66.67	0	4	0.00	0	0	0.00
-	(Serbia) Đorđe Gagić	6	13	21	61.90	14	31	45.16	0	2	0.00
-	(United States) Gary Talton	8	9	12	75.00	22	48	45.83	5	24	20.83
-	(Greece) Vangelis Sakellariou	6	1	2	50.00	0	2	0.00	4	12	33.33
	Team totals	20	265	401	66.08	427	818	52.20	143	426	33.57

Last updated: 7 March 2020
Source: ESAKE

=== Greek Cup ===
#	Player	GP	PTS	PPG	TR	RPG	DR	OR	AST	APG	STL	SPG	BLK	BPG
1	(United States) Toarlyn Fitzpatrick	0	0	0.00	0	0.0	0	0	0	0.00	0	0.00	0	0.00
2	(United States) Ken Brown	0	0	0.00	0	0.0	0	0	0	0.00	0	0.00	0	0.00
4	(Greece) Lefteris Bochoridis	1	15	15.00	11	11.00	8	3	3	3.00	2	2.00	1	1.00
5	(Greece) Kostas Vlasios	0	0	0.00	0	0.00	0	0	0	0.00	0	0.00	0	0.00
7	(Greece) Dimitris Flionis	1	3	3.00	0	0.00	0	0	2	2.00	2	2.00	0	0.00
8	(Bosnia and Herzegovina) Milan Milošević	1	5	5.00	4	4.00	3	1	0	0.00	1	1.00	0	0.00
10	(Greece) Giannis Sidiroilias	0	0	0.00	0	0.00	0	0	0	0.00	0	0.00	0	0.00
11	(Greece) Chrysostomos Sandramanis	0	0	0.00	0	0.00	0	0	0	0.00	0	0.00	0	0.00
13	(Lithuania) Martynas Gecevičius	1	12	12.00	0	0.00	0	0	2	2.00	1	1.00	0	0.00
14	(Greece) Georgios Georgakis	0	0	0.00	0	0.00	0	0	0	0.00	0	0.00	0	0.00
15	(Greece) Diamantis Slaftsakis	1	2	2.00	3	3.00	2	1	1	1.00	0	0.00	0	0.00
16	(Greece) Omiros Netzipoglou	0	0	0.00	0	0.00	0	0	0	0.00	0	0.00	0	0.00
18	(Montenegro) Vladimir Dragičević	1	19	19.00	7	7.00	4	3	1	1.00	0	0.00	0	0.00
30	(United States) Jaylen Morris	1	0	0.00	0	0.00	0	0	0	0.00	0	0.00	0	0.00
32	(Greece) Stratos Voulgaropoulos	0	0	0.00	0	0.00	0	0	0	0.00	0	0.00	0	0.00
-	(Serbia) Đorđe Gagić	1	5	5.00	1	1.00	1	0	0	0.00	1	1.00	0	0.00
-	(United States) Gary Talton	1	2	2.00	3	3.00	3	0	1	1.00	0	0.00	0	0.00
-	(Greece) Vangelis Sakellariou	1	0	0.00	2	2.00	2	0	0	0.00	2	2.00	0	0.00
	Team				2		2	0						
	Team totals	1	63	63.00	33	33.00	25	8	10	10.00	9	9.00	1	1.00

==== Shooting ====
#	Player	GP	FTA	FTM	FT%	2PM	2PA	2P%	3PM	3PA	3P%
1	(United States) Toarlyn Fitzpatrick	0	0	0	0.00	0	0	0.00	0	0	0.00
2	(United States) Ken Brown	0	0	0	0.00	0	0	0.00	0	0	0.00
4	(Greece) Lefteris Bochoridis	1	5	8	62.50	5	12	41.67	0	1	0.00
5	(Greece) Kostas Vlasios	0	0	0	0.00	0	0	0.00	0	0	0.00
7	(Greece) Dimitris Flionis	1	1	2	50.00	1	6	16.67	0	0	0.00
8	(Bosnia and Herzegovina) Milan Milošević	1	0	0	0.00	1	4	25.00	1	3	33.33
10	(Greece) Giannis Sidiroilias	0	0	0	0.00	0	0	0.00	0	0	0.00
11	(Greece) Chrysostomos Sandramanis	0	0	0	0.00	0	0	0.00	0	0	0.00
13	(Lithuania) Martynas Gecevičius	1	4	5	80.00	1	2	50.00	2	4	50.00
14	(Greece) Georgios Georgakis	0	0	0	0.00	0	0	0.00	0	0	0.00
15	(Greece) Diamantis Slaftsakis	1	0	0	0.00	1	1	100.00	0	2	0.00
16	(Greece) Omiros Netzipoglou	0	0	0	0.00	0	0	0.00	0	0	0.00
18	(Montenegro) Vladimir Dragičević	1	1	2	50.00	9	14	64.29	0	0	0.00
30	(United States) Jaylen Morris	1	0	0	0.00	0	0	0.00	0	1	0.00
32	(Greece) Stratos Voulgaropoulos	0	0	0	0.00	0	0	0.00	0	0	0.00
-	(Serbia) Đorđe Gagić	1	3	6	50.00	1	5	20.00	0	0	0.00
-	(United States) Gary Talton	1	0	0	0.00	1	4	25.00	0	3	0.00
-	(Greece) Vangelis Sakellariou	1	0	0	0.00	0	0	0.00	0	1	0.00
	Team totals	1	14	23	60.87	20	48	41.67	3	15	20.00

Last updated: 2 October 2019
Source: sportstats.gr
