= 2016–17 AEK B.C. season =

AEK
2016–17 season
- Chairman: Makis Angelopoulos
- Head coach: Jure Zdovc (1-20); Sotiris Manolopoulos (21-26)
- Arena: Nikos Galis Olympic Indoor Hall
- Greek League: 3rd
- Greek Cup: Semifinalists
- FIBA Champions League: Round of 16
Home	Away	Alternate

The 2016–17 AEK B.C. season was AEK's 60th season in the top-tier level Greek Basket League. AEK played in three different competitions during that season.

== Transfers 2016–17 ==
=== Players in ===
No.	Pos.	Nat.	Name	Age	Moving from		Type	Ends	Transfer fee	Date	Source
31	F	(United States)	Jawad Williams	33	Royal Halı Gaziantep	(Turkey)	End of contract	1 year	Free	June 13, 2016	
20	PG	(Montenegro)	Nikola Ivanović	22	Mega Leks	(Serbia)	End of contract	3 years	Free	June 14, 2016	
7	G/F	(Greece)	Kostas Vasileiadis	32	Obradoiro CAB	(Spain)	End of contract	2 years	Free	June 17, 2016	
13	C	(United States)	Josh Owens	27	Umana Reyer Venezia	(Italy)	End of contract	1 year	Free	June 18, 2016	
11	PG	(Georgia (country))	Michael Dixon	25	ČEZ Nymburk	(Czech Republic)	End of contract	1+1 years	Free	June 21, 2016	
	C	(Greece)	Manos Chatzidakis	16	Panionios Leros	(Greece)	Transfer	7 years	Undisclosed	June 28, 2016	
12	SG	(Greece)	Giannoulis Larentzakis	22	CAI Zaragoza	(Spain)	Transfer	4 years	€25,000	June 28, 2016	
24	SF	(Greece)	Dionysis Skoulidas	18	Peristeri	(Greece)	Transfer	3 years	Undisclosed	July 1, 2016	
	PG	(Greece)	Anastasios Spyroglou	14	Ilysiakos	(Greece)	From the youth squad	8 years	Undisclosed	July 11, 2016	
9	C	(Greece)	Dimitrios Charitopoulos	32	Koroivos	(Greece)	End of contract	1 year	Free	August 31, 2016	
1	G	(Croatia)	Roko Ukić	31	Pallacanestro Cantù	(Italy)	End of contract	1 year	Free	September 1, 2016	
14	C	(United States)	Randal Falker	31	SLUC Nancy Basket	(France)	End of contract	1 year	Free	October 10, 2016	
4	SG	(Netherlands)	Yannick Franke	20	Bisons Loimaa	(Finland)	End of contract	3 years	Free	October 16, 2016	
16	G/F	(Bosnia and Herzegovina)	Edin Atić	19	Trikala Aries	(Greece)	End of loan	–	Free	December 20, 2016	
4	C	(Nigeria)	Chinemelu Elonu	29	Beşiktaş	(Turkey)	End of contract	4 months	Free	January 2, 2017	
3	G	(Republic of Ireland)	Donnie McGrath	32	Long Island Nets	(United States)	End of contract	4 months	Free	January 12, 2017	
18	G/F	(Australia)	Brad Newley	31	Sydney Kings	(Australia)	Loan	3 months	Free	February 13, 2017	
32	F/C	(Greece)	Loukas Mavrokefalidis	32	Qingdao DoubleStar	(China)	End of contract	3 months	Free	February 20, 2017	

Total spending: ▼€25,000+

=== Players out ===
No.	Pos.	Nat.	Name	Age	Moving to		Type	Transfer fee	Date	Source
50	C	(Nigeria)	Micheal Eric	28	Bilbao Basket	(Spain)	Expired contract	Free	July 1, 2016	
14	G	(United States)	J'Covan Brown	26	Pınar Karşıyaka	(Turkey)	Expired contract	Free	July 1, 2016	
13	SG	(United States)	T. J. Carter	31	Stal Ostrów Wielkopolski	(Poland)	Expired contract	Free	July 1, 2016	
20	G/F	(Greece)	Giannis Kalampokis	37	Retired		Expired contract	Free	July 1, 2016	
19	PG	(Greece)	Dimitrios Katsivelis	24	Astana	(Kazakhstan)	Contract terminated	Free	July 1, 2016	
15	C	(Greece)	Zisis Sarikopoulos	26	Promitheas Patras	(Greece)	Contract terminated	Free	July 17, 2016	
12	C	(Greece)	Loukas Mavrokefalidis	32	Qingdao DoubleStar	(China)	Contract terminated	Free	August 27, 2016	
7	SF	(United States)	Malik Hairston	29	Hapoel Jerusalem	(Israel)	Contract terminated	Free	August 31, 2016	
3	PF	(Greece)	Nikos Kamarianos	19	Nea Kifissia	(Greece)	Loan	–	September 3, 2016	
4	PG	(Greece)	Nondas Papantoniou	26	Araberri	(Spain)	Contract terminated	Free	September 23, 2016	
14	G/F	(Greece)	Nick Paulos	24	Pagrati	(Greece)	Loan	–	October 5, 2016	
13	C	(United States)	Josh Owens	27	Pınar Karşıyaka	(Turkey)	Contract terminated	Free	October 10, 2016	
16	G/F	(Bosnia and Herzegovina)	Edin Atić	19	Trikala Aries	(Greece)	Loan	–	November 2, 2016	
4	SG	(Netherlands)	Yannick Franke	20	Zadar	(Croatia)	Contract terminated	Free	November 25, 2016	
14	C	(United States)	Randal Falker	31	Steaua București	(Romania)	Contract terminated	Free	January 2, 2017	
20	PG	(Montenegro)	Nikola Ivanović	22	Betaland Capo d'Orlando	(Italy)	Loan	–	January 11, 2017	
31	F	(United States)	Jawad Williams	33	Grissin Bon Reggio Emilia	(Italy)	Contract terminated	Free	February 12, 2017	

Total income: ▲€0

Total expenditure: ▼€25,000+

== Preseason and friendlies ==
Win Loss

30 August 2016 1	AEK (Greece)	73–49	(Poland) Start Lublin	Kranjska Gora
20:00 (EET)	Scoring by quarter: 26-12, 14-13, 23-5, 10-19
	Pts: Josh Owens 12		Pts: Stefan Đorđević 12	Arena: Dvorana Hall

3 September 2016 2	KK Krka (Slovenia)	66–78	(Greece) AEK	Kranjska Gora
20:00 (EET)	Scoring by quarter: 18-21, 17-17, 7-23, 24-17
	Pts: Marko Luković 20		Pts: Dušan Šakota 14	Arena: Dvorana Hall

4 September 2016 3	AEK (Greece)	79–86	(Turkey) Anadolu Efes	Kranjska Gora
20:30 (EET)	Scoring by quarter: 21-19, 18-25, 18-20, 22-22
	Pts: Kostas Vasileiadis 22		Pts: Derrick Brown, Thomas Heurtel 17	Arena: Dvorana Hall

10 September 2016 4	AEK (Greece)	68–74	(Cyprus) AEK Larnaca	Athens
19:00 (EET)	Scoring by quarter: 18-20, 20-13, 13-25, 17-16
	Pts: Dušan Šakota 15		Pts: Dijon Thompson 19	Arena: Nikos Galis Olympic Indoor Hall; Referees: Koromilas, Psarianos, Kaldiris

12 September 2016 5	AEK (Greece)	67–68	(Israel) Maccabi Tel Aviv	Athens
19:00 (EET)	Scoring by quarter: 18-18, 15-24, 13-13, 21-13
	Pts: Jawad Williams 17		Pts: Sylven Landesberg 15	Arena: Nikos Galis Olympic Indoor Hall; Referees: Piloidis, Anastopoulos, Manos

14 September 2016 6	AEK (Greece)	84–90	(Russia) CSKA Moscow	Athens
19:00 (EET)	Scoring by quarter: 27-23, 22-28, 16-16, 19-23
OTE Sport	Pts: Dušan Šakota 20		Pts: Miloš Teodosić 18	Arena: Nikos Galis Olympic Indoor Hall; Referees: Schinas, Koromilas, Somos

21 September 2016 7	Tofaş (Turkey)	81–80	(Greece) AEK	Bursa
19:00 (EET)	Scoring by quarter: 25-17, 20-24, 24-19, 12-20
Web TV	Pts: Jordan Hamilton 17		Pts: Michael Dixon 24	Arena: Bursa Atatürk Sport Hall

23 September 2016 8	AEK (Greece)	92–88	(Turkey) Banvit	Bursa
19:00 (EET)	Scoring by quarter: 20-24, 26-17, 24-22, 22-25
Web TV	Pts: Michael Dixon 24		Pts: Jeremy Chappell 25	Arena: Bursa Atatürk Sport Hall

24 September 2016 9	AEK (Greece)	72–78	(Turkey) Uşak Sportif	Bursa
18:00 (EET)	Scoring by quarter: 21-15, 19-18, 9-21, 23-24
Web TV	Pts: Michael Dixon 17		Pts: Mark Lyons 23	Arena: Bursa Atatürk Sport Hall

28 September 2016 10	AEK (Greece)	96–95	(Turkey) Galatasaray Odeabank	Athens
19:30 (EET)	Scoring by quarter: 28-13, 24-20, 23-28, 21-34
OTE Sport	Pts: Michael Dixon 34		Pts: Russ Smith 29	Arena: Nikos Galis Olympic Indoor Hall; Referees: Anastopoulos, Psarianos, Andrikopoulos

1 October 2016 11	AEK (Greece)	85–56	(Greece) Amyntas	Athens
17:00 (EET)	Scoring by quarter: 19-14, 27-11, 22-18, 17-13
				Arena: Nikos Galis Olympic Indoor Hall; Referees: Papathanasiou, Pavlopoulos, Polychronis

== Competitions ==
=== Overall ===
Competition	Started round	Current position / round	Final position / round	First match	Last match
Greek Basket League	Matchday 1	—	3rd	9 October 2016	3 June 2017
Greek Cup	Quarterfinals	—	Semifinalists	6 October 2016	14 January 2017
Champions League	Matchday 1	—	Round of 16	18 October 2016	8 March 2017

Updated to match played April 13, 2017
Source: Competitions

=== Overview ===
Competition	Record							
Competition	Pld	W	D	L	PF	PA	PD	Win %
Greek Basket League	35	25	0	10	2,758	2,537	+221	71.43
Greek Cup	2	1	0	1	174	134	+40	50.00
Champions League	18	12	0	6	1,416	1,286	+130	66.67
Total	55	38	0	17	4,348	3,957	+391	69.09

Last updated: June 8, 2019
Source: Competitions

=== Greek League ===
==== League table ====
Pos	Team	Pld	W	L	PF	PA	PD	Pts	Qualification or relegation
1	Olympiacos	26	25	1	2096	1650	+446	51	Qualification to semifinals
2	Panathinaikos Superfoods	26	25	1	2206	1706	+500	51	Qualification to semifinals
3	AEK	26	19	7	2055	1834	+221	45	Qualification to quarterfinals
4	Aris	26	15	11	1972	1863	+109	41	Qualification to quarterfinals
5	PAOK	26	14	12	1972	2009	−37	40	Qualification to first round

Source: ESAKE

==== Results summary ====
Overall						Home					Away				
Pld	W	L	PF	PA	PD	W	L	PF	PA	PD	W	L	PF	PA	PD
26	19	7	2055	1834	+221	11	2	1061	918	+143	8	5	994	916	+78

Last updated: April 13, 2017.
Source: Competitive matches

==== Results by round ====
Round	1	2	3	4	5	6	7	8	9	10	11	12	13	14	15	16	17	18	19	20	21	22	23	24	25	26
Ground	A	H	A	A	H	A	H	A	H	A	H	A	H	H	A	H	H	A	H	A	H	A	H	A	H	A
Result	W	W	W	W	W	W	W	L	W	L	W	L	W	W	W	W	W	L	W	W	L	W	L	W	W	L
Position	2	1	1	1	1	1	1	3	3	3	3	3	3	3	3	3	3	3	3	3	3	3	3	3	3	3

Updated to match(es) played on April 13, 2017. Source: Competitive matches
A = Away; H = Home; W = Win; D = Draw; L = Loss

==== Regular season ====
Win Loss

9 October 2016 1	Apollon Patras Carna	59–77	AEK	Patras
17:00 (EET)	Scoring by quarter: 20-24, 15-11, 16-22, 8-20
Nova Sports	Pts: Georgios Tsiaras, Chris Jones 13; Rebs: Tyler Kalinoski 7 Asts: Tyler Kalinoski 3 PIR: Dimitrios Verginis 13	Boxscore	Pts: Michael Dixon 19; Rebs: Milan Milošević 9 Asts: Roko Ukić, Nikola Ivanović 3 PIR: Michael Dixon 15	Arena: Apollon Patras Indoor Hall; Referees: Godas, Papapetrou, Simeonidis

15 October 2016 2	AEK	96–56	Lavrio DHI	Athens
17:00 (EET)	Scoring by quarter: 29-12, 24-16, 16-14, 27-14
OTE Sport	Pts: Michael Dixon 12; Rebs: Dušan Šakota 6 Asts: Roko Ukić 5 PIR: Michael Dixon 17	Boxscore	Pts: Brandon Young 14; Rebs: Tyren Johnson 5 Asts: Brandon Young, Demarius Bolds 4 PIR: Brandon Young 12	Arena: Nikos Galis Olympic Indoor Hall; Referees: Koromilas, Diamantis, Xenikakis

22 October 2016 3	Kymis Seajets	55–81	AEK	Kymi
17:00 (EET)	Scoring by quarter: 6-29, 8-17, 17-19, 24-16
Nova Sports	Pts: Jordan Morgan 11; Rebs: Jordan Morgan 7 Asts: Dimitrios Stamatis 5 PIR: Jordan Morgan 12	Boxscore	Pts: Michael Dixon 18; Rebs: Randal Falker, Dimitrios Mavroeidis 6 Asts: Giannoulis Larentzakis 3 PIR: Michael Dixon 18	Arena: Tasos Kabouris Indoor Hall; Referees: Karakatsounis, Andrikopoulos, Tsaroucha

29 October 2016 4	Trikala Aries	59–78	AEK	Trikala
17:00 (EET)	Scoring by quarter: 16-19, 16-12, 20-30, 7-17
Nova Sports	Pts: David Haughton 13; Rebs: Mike Caffey, Gilvydas Biruta 5 Asts: Mike Caffey 5 PIR: Gilvydas Biruta 13	Boxscore	Pts: Jawad Williams, Kostas Vasileiadis 14; Rebs: Dušan Šakota 6 Asts: Roko Ukić 5 PIR: Dušan Šakota 17	Arena: Trikala Indoor Hall; Referees: Poursanidis, Maglogiannis, Tsonos

5 November 2016 5	AEK	80–62	Rethymno Cretan Kings	Athens
17:00 (EET)	Scoring by quarter: 25-13, 20-21, 12-17, 23-11
OTE Sport	Pts: Kostas Vasileiadis 15; Rebs: Milan Milošević 9 Asts: Michael Dixon 7 PIR: Milan Milošević 19	Boxscore	Pts: Toarlyn Fitzpatrick, Robert Arnold 15; Rebs: Dejan Kravić 16; Asts: Gary Talton 3 PIR: Dejan Kravić 21	Arena: Nikos Galis Olympic Indoor Hall; Referees: Somos, Deslis, Xenikakis

12 November 2016 6	PAOK	71–78	AEK	Pylaia
20:00 (EET)	Scoring by quarter: 21-15, 17-19, 20-19, 13-25
Nova Sports	Pts: Darryl Bryant 17; Rebs: Linos Chrysikopoulos 8 Asts: Nenad Miljenović 6 PIR: Andreas Glyniadakis 15	Boxscore	Pts: Michael Dixon 22; Rebs: Milan Milošević 15; Asts: Roko Ukić, Dimitrios Mavroeidis 3 PIR: Milan Milošević 18	Arena: P.A.O.K. Sports Arena; Referees: Anastopoulos, Bitis, Pantelidis

19 November 2016 7	AEK	76–60	Promitheas Patras	Athens
17:00 (EET)	Scoring by quarter: 17-23, 21-17, 19-8, 19-12
OTE Sport	Pts: Kostas Vasileiadis 19; Rebs: Milan Milošević 7 Asts: Nikola Ivanović 9 PIR: Kostas Vasileiadis 19	Boxscore	Pts: Mouhammad Faye 12; Rebs: Cavell Johnson, Keydren Clark 6 Asts: Nikos Gikas 4 PIR: Mouhammad Faye 14	Arena: Nikos Galis Olympic Indoor Hall; Referees: Manos, Pagonis, Simeonidis

26 November 2016 8	Olympiacos	78–67	AEK	Piraeus
19:00 (EET)	Scoring by quarter: 26-16, 17-18, 22-12, 13-21
OTE Sport	Pts: Matt Lojeski 17; Rebs: Khem Birch 10; Asts: Vassilis Spanoulis 9 PIR: Khem Birch 25	Boxscore	Pts: Roko Ukić, Dušan Šakota 14; Rebs: Dušan Šakota 7 Asts: Roko Ukić 4 PIR: Dušan Šakota 22	Arena: Peace and Friendship Stadium; Referees: Anastopoulos, Karakatsounis, Pantelidis

3 December 2016 9	AEK	89–75	Koroivos	Athens
17:00 (EET)	Scoring by quarter: 24-20, 22-19, 22-19, 21-17
OTE Sport	Pts: Nikola Ivanović, Jawad Williams 19; Rebs: Milan Milošević 7 Asts: Milan Milošević 7 PIR: Milan Milošević 28	Boxscore	Pts: Ken Brown 19; Rebs: Andreja Milutinović 6 Asts: Ken Brown, Devon van Oostrum 4 PIR: Ken Brown 19	Arena: Nikos Galis Olympic Indoor Hall; Referees: Georgiadis, Simeonidis, Kontilis

11 December 2016 10	Panathinaikos Superfoods	77–68	AEK	Athens
21:30 (EET)	Scoring by quarter: 22-20, 17-19, 17-17
Nova Sports	Pts: James Feldeine 20; Rebs: Chris Singleton 7 Asts: James Feldeine 6 PIR: James Feldeine 26	Boxscore	Pts: Roko Ukić 19; Rebs: Randal Falker 7 Asts: Nikola Ivanović, Roko Ukić, Michael Dixon 2 PIR: Roko Ukić 17	Arena: Nikos Galis Olympic Indoor Hall; Referees: Piloidis, Anastopoulos, Bitis

17 December 2016 11	AEK	84–60	Doxa Lefkadas	Athens
17:00 (EET)	Scoring by quarter: 22-10, 24-16, 16-20, 22-14
OTE Sport	Pts: Dušan Šakota 16; Rebs: Milan Milošević 7 Asts: Nikola Ivanović 5 PIR: Milan Milošević 20	Boxscore	Pts: Melsahn Basabe 18; Rebs: Melsahn Basabe 13; Asts: Shannon Scott 5 PIR: Melsahn Basabe 26	Arena: Nikos Galis Olympic Indoor Hall; Referees: Vardalos, Pagonis, Darlamitsos

26 December 2016 12	Kolossos H Hotels	86–73	AEK	Rhodes
16:00 (EET)	Scoring by quarter: 16-13, 24-25, 20-16, 26-19
Nova Sports	Pts: Trevor Releford 19; Rebs: Panagiotis Vasilopoulos 12; Asts: Christos Saloustros, Panagiotis Vasilopoulos, Langston Hall 4 PIR: Trevor Releford, Juvonte Reddic 22	Boxscore	Pts: Dušan Šakota 16; Rebs: Dušan Šakota 6 Asts: Roko Ukić 7 PIR: Roko Ukić 19	Arena: Venetokleio Indoor Hall; Referees: Schinas, Andrikopoulos, Diamantis

7 January 2017 13	AEK	81–61	Aris	Athens
17:00 (EET)	Scoring by quarter: 23-20, 24-16, 16-12, 18-13
OTE Sport	Pts: Michael Dixon 19; Rebs: Dimitrios Mavroeidis 9 Asts: Roko Ukić, Nikola Ivanović 5 PIR: Michael Dixon 17	Boxscore	Pts: Will Cummings 14; Rebs: Tadija Dragićević, Will Cummings 7 Asts: Vassilis Xanthopoulos 5 PIR: Tadija Dragićević 17	Arena: Nikos Galis Olympic Indoor Hall; Referees: Anastopoulos, Manos, Deslis

21 January 2017 14	AEK	88–69	Apollon Patras Carna	Athens
17:00 (EET)	Scoring by quarter: 30-14, 20-19, 19-17, 19-19
OTE Sport	Pts: Roko Ukić 18; Rebs: Chinemelu Elonu 10; Asts: Roko Ukić 5 PIR: Roko Ukić 21	Boxscore	Pts: Dimitrios Verginis 15; Rebs: Sarantis Mastrogiannopoulos, Michael Cobbins 5 Asts: Ioannis Kouzeloglou 3 PIR: Michael Cobbins 16	Arena: Nikos Galis Olympic Indoor Hall; Referees: Karakatsounis, Katrachouras, Papathanasiou

28 January 2017 15	Lavrio DHI	84–87	AEK	Lavrio
17:00 (EET)	Scoring by quarter: 25-25, 10-16, 29-26, 20-20
Nova Sports	Pts: Kevin Punter 28; Rebs: Sean Evans 5 Asts: Zamal Nixon 7 PIR: Kevin Punter 29	Boxscore	Pts: Giannoulis Larentzakis 19; Rebs: Jawad Williams, Giannoulis Larentzakis 7 Asts: Roko Ukić 7 PIR: Giannoulis Larentzakis 23	Arena: Lavrio Indoor Hall; Referees: Manos, Panagiotou, Vardalos

4 February 2017 16	AEK	71–65	Kymis Seajets	Athens
17:00 (EET)	Scoring by quarter: 12-19, 23-16, 13-14, 23-16
OTE Sport	Pts: Dušan Šakota 20; Rebs: Chinemelu Elonu 8 Asts: Michael Dixon, Donnie McGrath 3 PIR: Dušan Šakota 34	Boxscore	Pts: Dimitrios Stamatis 18; Rebs: Daniel Orton, Martin Pahlmblad 7 Asts: Dimitrios Stamatis 3 PIR: Daniel Orton 19	Arena: Nikos Galis Olympic Indoor Hall; Referees: Diamantis, Malamas, Zacharis

11 February 2017 17	AEK	87–82	Trikala Aries	Athens
17:00 (EET)	Scoring by quarter: 21-20, 16-22, 14-20, 36-20
OTE Sport	Pts: Dušan Šakota 25; Rebs: Giannoulis Larentzakis 8 Asts: Michael Dixon, Giannoulis Larentzakis, Donnie McGrath 3 PIR: Dušan Šakota 26	Boxscore	Pts: Kelsey Barlow 18; Rebs: Gilvydas Biruta 8 Asts: Kelsey Barlow 6 PIR: Kelsey Barlow 25	Arena: Nikos Galis Olympic Indoor Hall; Referees: Bitis, Poursanidis, Zakestidis

15 February 2017 18	Rethymno Cretan Kings	72–65	AEK	Rethymno
16:00 (EET)	Scoring by quarter: 21-18, 8-13, 25-20, 18-14
Nova Sports	Pts: Toarlyn Fitzpatrick 24; Rebs: Toarlyn Fitzpatrick 7 Asts: Gary Talton 5 PIR: Toarlyn Fitzpatrick 27	Boxscore	Pts: Michael Dixon 16; Rebs: Dušan Šakota 4 Asts: Roko Ukić 4 PIR: Michael Dixon 13	Arena: Melina Merkouri Indoor Hall; Referees: Somos, Panagiotou, Tarenidis

25 February 2017 19	AEK	77–71	PAOK	Athens
17:00 (EET)	Scoring by quarter: 16-27, 21-12, 22-15, 18-17
OTE Sport	Pts: Roko Ukić 17; Rebs: Chinemelu Elonu, Kostas Vasileiadis 9 Asts: Michael Dixon 3 PIR: Chinemelu Elonu, Kostas Vasileiadis 14	Boxscore	Pts: Keith Clanton 17; Rebs: Keith Clanton 8 Asts: Vangelis Margaritis 4 PIR: Keith Clanton, Thad McFadden 18	Arena: Nikos Galis Olympic Indoor Hall; Referees: Schinas, Poursanidis, Diamantis

4 March 2017 20	Promitheas Patras	67–86	AEK	Patras
17:00 (EET)	Scoring by quarter: 21-18, 18-28, 11-23, 17-17
Nova Sports	Pts: Miroslav Todić 15; Rebs: Mouhammad Faye 8 Asts: Jerel Blassingame 5 PIR: Miroslav Todić 16	Boxscore	Pts: Kostas Vasileiadis 17; Rebs: Loukas Mavrokefalidis, Kostas Vasileiadis 7 Asts: Roko Ukić 6 PIR: Loukas Mavrokefalidis, Kostas Vasileiadis 25	Arena: Dimitris Tofalos Arena; Referees: Piloidis, Bitis, Simeonidis

13 March 2017 21	AEK	63–70	Olympiacos	Athens
19:00 (EET)	Scoring by quarter: 19-16, 18-19, 10-17, 16-18
OTE Sport	Pts: Michael Dixon 14; Rebs: Chinemelu Elonu 8 Asts: Roko Ukić 4 PIR: Chinemelu Elonu, Loukas Mavrokefalidis, Mavroeidis 13	Boxscore	Pts: Matt Lojeski 17; Rebs: Georgios Printezis 10; Asts: Vangelis Mantzaris, Vassilis Spanoulis 4 PIR: Matt Lojeski 22	Arena: Nikos Galis Olympic Indoor Hall; Referees: Schinas, Karakatsounis, Panagiotou

18 March 2017 22	Koroivos	63–89	AEK	Amaliada
17:00 (EET)	Scoring by quarter: 21-22, 21-22, 12-24, 9-21
Nova Sports	Pts: Toddrick Gotcher 20; Rebs: Cheikh Sane 9 Asts: Markel Starks 3 PIR: Toddrick Gotcher 18	Boxscore	Pts: Dušan Šakota 18; Rebs: Loukas Mavrokefalidis 8 Asts: Michael Dixon 6 PIR: Loukas Mavrokefalidis 29	Arena: Amaliada Indoor Hall; Referees: Manos, Tzafleris, Bikas

26 March 2017 23	AEK	87–106(OT)	Panathinaikos Superfoods	Athens
19:00 (EET)	Scoring by quarter: 24-23, 18-18, 20-16, 15-20, Overtime: 7-7
OTE Sport	Pts: Loukas Mavrokefalidis 19; Rebs: Chinemelu Elonu 11; Asts: Giannoulis Larentzakis 6 PIR: Loukas Mavrokefalidis 23	Boxscore	Pts: Chris Singleton 22; Rebs: Chris Singleton 16; Asts: Mike James 4 PIR: Chris Singleton 37	Arena: Nikos Galis Olympic Indoor Hall; Referees: Anastopoulos, Poursanidis, Diamantis

1 April 2017 24	Doxa Lefkadas	64–68	AEK	Lefkada
17:00 (EET)	Scoring by quarter: 17-15, 19-23, 15-16, 13-14
Nova Sports	Pts: Ivan Maraš 23; Rebs: Alex Harris 8 Asts: Ty Abbott 4 PIR: Ivan Maraš 26	Boxscore	Pts: Loukas Mavrokefalidis 21; Rebs: Loukas Mavrokefalidis 8 Asts: Dušan Šakota, Giannoulis Larentzakis 3 PIR: Loukas Mavrokefalidis 24	Arena: Lefkada Indoor Hall; Referees: Panagiotou, Pafilis, Theodoropoulos

8 April 2017 25	AEK	82–81	Kolossos H Hotels	Athens
17:00 (EET)	Scoring by quarter: 12-19, 22-21, 26-15, 22-26
OTE Sport	Pts: Dušan Šakota 21; Rebs: Loukas Mavrokefalidis 6 Asts: Donnie McGrath 7 PIR: Michael Dixon 26	Boxscore	Pts: Langston Hall 18; Rebs: Trevor Releford 7 Asts: Langston Hall 8 PIR: Langston Hall 22	Arena: Nikos Galis Olympic Indoor Hall; Referees: Bitis, Tsaroucha, Darlamitsos

13 April 2017 26	Aris	81–77	AEK	Thessaloniki
17:00 (EET)	Scoring by quarter: 15-24, 22-23, 17-10, 27-20
Nova Sports	Pts: Will Cummings 24; Rebs: Vassilis Symtsak, Vlado Janković, Vassilis Xanthopoulos 6 Asts: Vassilis Xanthopoulos 6 PIR: Will Cummings 22	Boxscore	Pts: Donnie McGrath 17; Rebs: Chinemelu Elonu 8 Asts: Roko Ukić 7 PIR: Chinemelu Elonu 15	Arena: Alexandreio Melathron Nick Galis Hall; Referees: Karakatsounis, Poursanidis, Simeonidis

==== Results overview ====
Win Loss

Opposition	Home score	Away score	Double
Apollon Patras Carna	88–69	59–77	165–128
Aris	81–61	81–77	158–142
Doxa Lefkadas	84–60	64–68	152–124
Kolossos H Hotels	82–81	86–73	155–167
Koroivos	89–75	63–89	178–138
Kymis Seajets	71–65	55–81	152–120
Lavrio DHI	96–56	84–87	183–140
Olympiacos	63–70	78–67	130–148
Panathinaikos Superfoods	87–106	77–68	155–183
PAOK	77–71	71–78	155–142
Promitheas Patras	76–60	67–86	162–127
Rethymno Cretan Kings	80–62	72–65	145–134
Trikala Aries	87–82	59–78	165–141

==== Quarterfinals ====
Win Loss

30 April 2017 1st Round	AEK	90–78	Rethymno Cretan Kings	Athens
17:00 (EET)	Scoring by quarter: 19-14, 22-20, 25-20, 24-24
OTE Sport	Pts: Roko Ukić 24; Rebs: Dimitrios Mavroeidis 10; Asts: Roko Ukić 8 PIR: Roko Ukić 38	Boxscore	Pts: Walter Lemon Jr. 20; Rebs: Thomas Kottas 7 Asts: Gary Talton 4 PIR: Robert Arnold 21	Arena: Nikos Galis Olympic Indoor Hall; Referees: Somos, Bitis, Kaldiris

4 May 2017 2nd Round	Rethymno Cretan Kings	70–81	AEK	Rethymno
17:00 (EET)	Scoring by quarter: 23-19, 27-21, 6-24, 14-17
Nova Sports	Pts: Walter Lemon Jr. 14; Rebs: Michalis Kamperidis 7 Asts: Gary Talton 9 PIR: Michalis Kamperidis 19	Boxscore	Pts: Roko Ukić 18; Rebs: Milan Milošević 9 Asts: Donnie McGrath 5 PIR: Roko Ukić 22	Arena: Melina Merkouri Indoor Hall; Referees: Karakatsounis, Diamantis, Andrikopoulos

==== Semifinals ====
Win Loss

11 May 2017 1st Round	Panathinaikos Superfoods	80–70	AEK	Athens
19:00 (EET)	Scoring by quarter: 23-15, 12-24, 25-11, 20-20
Nova Sports	Pts: Nick Calathes 23; Rebs: Ioannis Bourousis 11; Asts: Nick Calathes 5 PIR: Nick Calathes 25	Boxscore	Pts: Dimitrios Mavroeidis 18; Rebs: Michael Dixon 7 Asts: Donnie McGrath 4 PIR: Dimitrios Mavroeidis, Michael Dixon 18	Arena: Nikos Galis Olympic Indoor Hall; Referees: Piloidis, Manos, Tsonos

14 May 2017 2nd Round	AEK	71–70	Panathinaikos Superfoods	Athens
17:00 (EET)	Scoring by quarter: 17-22, 20-22, 19-13, 15-13
OTE Sport	Pts: Milan Milošević 14; Rebs: Milan Milošević, Dimitrios Mavroeidis, Roko Ukić 6 Asts: Michael Dixon 5 PIR: Milan Milošević, Dimitrios Mavroeidis 20	Boxscore	Pts: Chris Singleton 19; Rebs: Chris Singleton 11; Asts: Nick Calathes 4 PIR: Chris Singleton 28	Arena: Nikos Galis Olympic Indoor Hall; Referees: Anastopoulos, Somos, Maglogiannis

18 May 2017 3rd Round	Panathinaikos Superfoods	81–72	AEK	Athens
19:00 (EET)	Scoring by quarter: 18-12, 14-19, 19-21, 30-20
Nova Sports	Pts: Nick Calathes 26; Rebs: Nick Calathes 6 Asts: Nick Calathes 6 PIR: Nick Calathes 27	Boxscore	Pts: Roko Ukić 14; Rebs: Milan Milošević 8 Asts: Roko Ukić 5 PIR: Roko Ukić 14	Arena: Nikos Galis Olympic Indoor Hall; Referees: Schinas, Poursanidis, Panagiotou

22 May 2017 4th Round	AEK	67–105	Panathinaikos Superfoods	Athens
19:00 (EET)	Scoring by quarter: 11-25, 18-24, 18-24, 20-32
OTE Sport	Pts: Roko Ukić 16; Rebs: Chinemelu Elonu 5 Asts: Michael Dixon 4 PIR: Dimitrios Mavroeidis 10	Boxscore	Pts: Nick Calathes 17; Rebs: Ioannis Bourousis 9 Asts: Nick Calathes 9 PIR: Nick Calathes 26	Arena: Nikos Galis Olympic Indoor Hall; Referees: Karakatsounis, Manos, Andrikopoulos

==== Third Place ====
Win Loss

28 May 2017 1st Round	AEK	90–74	Aris	Athens
18:00 (EET)	Scoring by quarter: 23-24, 25-17, 20-16, 22-17
OTE Sport	Pts: Milan Milošević 16; Rebs: Milan Milošević 12; Asts: Michael Dixon 9 PIR: Chinemelu Elonu 23	Boxscore	Pts: Vlado Janković 17; Rebs: Vlado Janković 11; Asts: Vassilis Xanthopoulos 5 PIR: Vlado Janković 23	Arena: Nikos Galis Olympic Indoor Hall; Referees: Piloidis, Diamantis, Tzafleris

31 May 2017 2nd Round	Aris	85–91	AEK	Thessaloniki
17:30 (EET)	Scoring by quarter: 21-22, 30-21, 17-20, 17-28
Nova Sports	Pts: Spyros Mourtos, Vlado Janković 18; Rebs: Vlado Janković 12; Asts: Vassilis Xanthopoulos 7 PIR: Spyros Mourtos 20	Boxscore	Pts: Giannoulis Larentzakis, Loukas Mavrokefalidis 19; Rebs: Milan Milošević, Michael Dixon 5 Asts: Michael Dixon 9 PIR: Giannoulis Larentzakis 20	Arena: Alexandreio Melathron Nick Galis Hall; Referees: Schinas, Bitis, Maglogiannis

3 June 2017 3rd Round	AEK	71–60	Aris	Athens
17:00 (EET)	Scoring by quarter: 18-19, 24-18, 14-8, 15-15
OTE Sport	Pts: Michael Dixon 19; Rebs: Chinemelu Elonu 9 Asts: Michael Dixon 6 PIR: Chinemelu Elonu 20	Boxscore	Pts: Michalis Tsairelis, Vassilis Kavvadas 11; Rebs: Spyros Mourtos 10; Asts: Dimitris Flionis 4 PIR: Spyros Mourtos 13	Arena: Nikos Galis Olympic Indoor Hall; Referees: Anastopoulos, Poursanidis G., Poursanidis K.

=== Greek Cup ===
Win Loss

Quarterfinals

October 6, 2016 Quarterfinals	AEK	98–57	Koroivos	Athens
18:30 (EET)	Scoring by quarter: 23-16, 24-17, 28-15, 23-9
Nova Sports	Pts: Michael Dixon 20		Pts: Josh Ritchart 12	Arena: Nikos Galis Olympic Indoor Hall; Referees: Koromilas, Tsaroucha, Malamas

Semifinals

January 14, 2017 Semifinals	Aris	77–76	AEK	Thessaloniki
17:00 (EET)	Scoring by quarter: 26-17, 20-27, 15-17, 16-15
Nova Sports	Pts: Will Cummings 20; Rebs: Vlado Janković 11; Asts: Michael Jenkins 4 PIR: Vlado Janković 18		Pts: Michael Dixon 23; Rebs: Dimitrios Mavroeidis 10; Asts: Roko Ukić 6 PIR: Michael Dixon 30	Arena: Alexandreio Melathron Nick Galis Hall; Referees: Piloidis, Anastopoulos, Panagiotou

=== Champions League ===
==== Regular season - Group E ====
Pos	Team	Pld	W	L	PF	PA	PD	Pts	Qualification	BJK	AEK	PAR	LUD	DSS	SPI	ZGA	SZO
1	(Turkey) Beşiktaş Sompo Japan	14	12	2	1178	1050	+128	26	Advance to round of 16	—	82–68	77–62	88–85	100–70	68–66	85–66	89–74
2	(Greece) AEK Athens	14	9	5	1107	992	+115	23	Advance to qualifiers	78–88	—	91–81	82–72	78–58	89–69	71–64	92–49
3	(Serbia) Partizan NIS	14	8	6	1038	1046	−8	22	Advance to qualifiers	86–71	65–69	—	86–82	87–88	70–84	58–56	77–67
4	(Germany) MHP Riesen Ludwigsburg	14	8	6	1150	1058	+92	22	Advance to qualifiers	89–83	72–67	64–65	—	75–78	88–66	87–77	99–56
5	(Italy) Dinamo Sassari	14	7	7	1099	1108	−9	21	Advance to qualifiers	74–75	80–78	99–85	79–80	—	95–75	74–70	97–88
6	(Belgium) Proximus Spirou	14	6	8	1040	1113	−73	20	Transfer to FIBA Europe Cup	75–92	58–80	63–65	78–96	63–57	—	86–69	92–87
7	(Poland) Stelmet Zielona Góra	14	4	10	1020	1084	−64	18	Transfer to FIBA Europe Cup	66–84	78–75	80–81	72–70	81–78	83–86	—	83–63
8	(Hungary) Szolnoki Olaj	14	2	12	1020	1201	−181	16		91–96	76–89	55–70	81–91	73–72	74–79	86–75	—

Source: Basketball Champions League

==== Results summary ====
Overall						Home					Away				
Pld	W	L	PF	PA	PD	W	L	PF	PA	PD	W	L	PF	PA	PD
14	9	5	1107	992	+115	6	1	581	481	+100	3	4	526	511	+15

Last updated: January 25, 2017.
Source: [https://www.championsleague.basketball/16-17/groups#

==== Results by round ====
Round	1	2	3	4	5	6	7	8	9	10	11	12	13	14
Ground	H	A	H	H	A	H	A	A	H	A	A	H	A	H
Result	W	W	L	W	L	W	L	W	W	L	L	W	W	W
Position	1	1	2	2	3	3	3	2	2	3	4	4	2	2

Updated to match(es) played on January 25, 2017. Source: [https://www.championsleague.basketball/16-17/AEK#
A = Away; H = Home; W = Win; D = Draw; L = Loss

==== Regular season ====
Win Loss

18 October 2016 1	AEK Athens (Greece)	92–49	(Hungary) Szolnoki Olaj	Athens
19:00 (EET)	Scoring by quarter: 26-13, 24-12, 23-14, 19-10
ERT1	Pts: Giannoulis Larentzakis 14; Rebs: Randal Falker 7 Asts: Roko Ukić 7 PIR: Dimitrios Mavroeidis 19	Boxscore	Pts: Miloš Borisov 10; Rebs: Troy Barnies 6 Asts: Dávid Vojvoda 5 PIR: Janos Eilingsfeld 9	Arena: Nikos Galis Olympic Indoor Hall; Referees: Zashchuk (UKR), Kardum (CRO), Rosso (FRA)

25 October 2016 2	Proximus Spirou (Belgium)	58–80	(Greece) AEK Athens	Charleroi
21:30 (EET)	Scoring by quarter: 21-18, 16-25, 8-17, 13-20
Nova Sports	Pts: D. J. Richardson 17; Rebs: Adam Kemp 7 Asts: Alexandre Libert 3 PIR: Brandon Bowman 15	Boxscore	Pts: Roko Ukić 18; Rebs: Milan Milošević 7 Asts: Randal Falker, Michael Dixon 3 PIR: Roko Ukić 22	Arena: RTL Spiroudome; Referees: Jasevicius (LTU), Marques (POR), Velikov (BUL)

1 November 2016 3	AEK Athens (Greece)	78–88	(Turkey) Beşiktaş Sompo Japan	Athens
19:00 (EET)	Scoring by quarter: 18-22, 22-25, 21-17, 17-24
Nova Sports	Pts: Dušan Šakota 16; Rebs: Dušan Šakota, Michael Dixon, Dimitrios Mavroeidis, Jawad Williams 4 Asts: Dušan Šakota, Michael Dixon 5 PIR: Dušan Šakota 20	Boxscore	Pts: Earl Clark 24; Rebs: Vladimir Štimac 11; Asts: Michael Roll 6 PIR: Earl Clark 27	Arena: Nikos Galis Olympic Indoor Hall; Referees: Shulga (UKR), Cmikiewicz (POL), Maricic (SRB)

8 November 2016 4	AEK Athens (Greece)	78–58	(Italy) Banco di Sardegna Sassari	Athens
21:00 (EET)	Scoring by quarter: 27-13, 20-13, 13-12, 18-20
Nova Sports	Pts: Jawad Williams 15; Rebs: Giannoulis Larentzakis 7 Asts: Roko Ukić 8 PIR: Jawad Williams 20	Boxscore	Pts: Darius Johnson-Odom 17; Rebs: Tautvydas Lydeka 6 Asts: Rok Stipčević, Darius Johnson-Odom 3 PIR: Tautvydas Lydeka 15	Arena: Nikos Galis Olympic Indoor Hall; Referees: Conde (ESP), Gurion (ISR), Vojinovic (MNE)

16 November 2016 5	MHP Riesen Ludwigsburg (Germany)	72–67	(Greece) AEK Athens	Ludwigsburg
21:30 (EET)	Scoring by quarter: 15-19, 21-12, 14-13, 22-23
Nova Sports	Pts: Tekele Cotton 17; Rebs: Tekele Cotton, Jack Cooley 7 Asts: Cliff Hammonds 9 PIR: Tekele Cotton 19	Boxscore	Pts: Michael Dixon 14; Rebs: Roko Ukić 8 Asts: Michael Dixon 3 PIR: Giannoulis Larentzakis 15	Arena: Arena Ludwigsburg; Referees: Perea (ESP), Maciulaitis (LTU), Suslov (EST)

23 November 2016 6	AEK Athens (Greece)	91–81	(Serbia) Partizan NIS	Athens
19:00 (EET)	Scoring by quarter: 22-14, 20-19, 22-29, 27-19
Nova Sports	Pts: Dušan Šakota 19; Rebs: Randal Falker 6 Asts: Roko Ukić 6 PIR: Michael Dixon 20	Boxscore	Pts: Will Hatcher 18; Rebs: Stefan Birčević 11; Asts: Branislav Ratkovica 7 PIR: Stefan Birčević 20	Arena: Nikos Galis Olympic Indoor Hall; Referees: Maestre (FRA), Chebyshev (UKR), Horozov (BUL)

29 November 2016 7	Stelmet Zielona Góra (Poland)	78–75	(Greece) AEK Athens	Zielona Góra
19:00 (EET)	Scoring by quarter: 15-17, 16-20, 24-14, 23-24
Nova Sports	Pts: Nemanja Djurišić 23; Rebs: Nemanja Djurišić 10; Asts: Łukasz Koszarek, Nemanja Djurišić, James Florence 5 PIR: Nemanja Djurišić 35	Boxscore	Pts: Michael Dixon 22; Rebs: Roko Ukić 6 Asts: Roko Ukić 9 PIR: Roko Ukić 25	Arena: CRS Hall Zielona Góra; Referees: Kalpakas (SWE), Beliakov (RUS), Ozols (LAT)

7 December 2016 8	Szolnoki Olaj (Hungary)	76–89	(Greece) AEK Athens	Szolnok
19:00 (EET)	Scoring by quarter: 22-21, 15-29, 21-24, 18-15
ERT3	Pts: Nikola Pavličević 22; Rebs: Miloš Borisov 6 Asts: Dávid Vojvoda, Aleksa Popović 4 PIR: Nikola Pavličević 21	Boxscore	Pts: Michael Dixon 29; Rebs: Randal Falker, Michael Dixon, Giannoulis Larentzakis 5 Asts: Roko Ukić, Michael Dixon 4 PIR: Michael Dixon 30	Arena: Tiszaligeti Sportcsarnok; Referees: Difallah (FRA), Aunkrogers (LAT), Proc (POL)

14 December 2016 9	AEK Athens (Greece)	89–69	(Belgium) Proximus Spirou	Athens
21:00 (EET)	Scoring by quarter: 27-12, 29-23, 19-19, 14-15
Nova Sports	Pts: Michael Dixon 23; Rebs: Jawad Williams 8 Asts: Giannoulis Larentzakis 4 PIR: Dušan Šakota, Michael Dixon 18	Boxscore	Pts: Brandon Bowman 14; Rebs: Jevohn Shepherd 5 Asts: Niels Marnegrave 5 PIR: Brandon Bowman 14	Arena: Nikos Galis Olympic Indoor Hall; Referees: Obradovic (BIH), Martolini (ITA), Matejek (CZE)

21 December 2016 10	Beşiktaş Sompo Japan (Turkey)	82–68	(Greece) AEK Athens	Istanbul
19:00 (EET)	Scoring by quarter: 28-11, 14-16, 15-14, 25-27
ERT2	Pts: Michael Thompson 17; Rebs: Vladimir Štimac 7 Asts: Michael Roll 9 PIR: Michael Thompson 20	Boxscore	Pts: Milan Milošević 15; Rebs: Milan Milošević 13; Asts: Roko Ukić 4 PIR: Milan Milošević 18	Arena: BJK Akatlar Arena; Referees: Glisic (SRB), Maestre (FRA), Rutesic (MNE)

4 January 2017 11	Banco di Sardegna Sassari (Italy)	80–78	(Greece) AEK Athens	Sassari
21:30 (EET)	Scoring by quarter: 26-24, 25-18, 13-18, 16-18
Nova Sports	Pts: David Bell 14; Rebs: Brian Sacchetti 4 Asts: Rok Stipčević 5 PIR: Rok Stipčević 17	Boxscore	Pts: Michael Dixon 18; Rebs: Dimitrios Mavroeidis 10; Asts: Roko Ukić 6 PIR: Roko Ukić 17	Arena: Palasport Roberta Serradimigni; Referees: Zurapovic (BIH), Proc (POL), Zashchuk (UKR)

10 January 2017 12	AEK Athens (Greece)	82–72	(Germany) MHP Riesen Ludwigsburg	Athens
21:00 (EET)	Scoring by quarter: 24-12, 21-22, 10-25, 27-13
Nova Sports	Pts: Dušan Šakota 27; Rebs: Milan Milošević 6 Asts: Roko Ukić, Michael Dixon 4 PIR: Dušan Šakota 24	Boxscore	Pts: Jack Cooley, Tekele Cotton 20; Rebs: Jack Cooley 7 Asts: Cliff Hammonds 4 PIR: Jack Cooley 21	Arena: Nikos Galis Olympic Indoor Hall; Referees: Jasevicius (LTU), Cmikiewicz (POL), Difallah (FRA)

18 January 2017 13	Partizan NIS (Serbia)	65–69	(Greece) AEK Athens	Belgrade
21:00 (EET)	Scoring by quarter: 11-19, 22-22, 20-14, 12-14
ERT3	Pts: Stefan Birčević 16; Rebs: Stefan Birčević 8 Asts: Branislav Ratkovica 5 PIR: Stefan Birčević 18	Boxscore	Pts: Giannoulis Larentzakis 14; Rebs: Milan Milošević 9 Asts: Roko Ukić 8 PIR: Giannoulis Larentzakis, Roko Ukić, Donnie McGrath 17	Arena: Hall Aleksandar Nikolić; Referees: Sahin (ITA), Gurion (ISR), Ozols (LAT)

25 January 2017 14	AEK Athens (Greece)	71–64	(Poland) Stelmet Zielona Góra	Athens
19:00 (EET)	Scoring by quarter: 19-17, 16-7, 20-14, 16-26
Nova Sports	Pts: Michael Dixon 21; Rebs: Chinemelu Elonu 6 Asts: Roko Ukić, Jawad Williams 3 PIR: Michael Dixon 18	Boxscore	Pts: Adam Hrycaniuk 19; Rebs: Adam Hrycaniuk 10; Asts: James Florence 5 PIR: Adam Hrycaniuk 24	Arena: Nikos Galis Olympic Indoor Hall; Referees: Zashchuk (UKR), Ciulin (ROU), Rosso (FRA)

==== Results overview ====
Win Loss

Opposition	Home score	Away score	Double
(Italy) Banco di Sardegna Sassari	78–58	80–78	156–138
(Turkey) Beşiktaş Sompo Japan	78–88	82–68	146–170
(Germany) MHP Riesen Ludwigsburg	82–72	72–67	149–144
(Serbia) Partizan NIS	91–81	65–69	160–146
(Belgium) Proximus Spirou	89–69	58–80	169–127
(Poland) Stelmet Zielona Góra	71–64	78–75	146–142
(Hungary) Szolnoki Olaj	92–49	76–89	181–125

==== Play-offs qualifiers ====
Win Loss

8 February 2017 1st Round	Juventus (Lithuania)	77–78 (Series: 77-78)	(Greece) AEK Athens	Utena
19:00 (EET)	Scoring by quarter: 16-9, 14-21, 23-26, 24-22
Nova Sports	Pts: Jamar Diggs 18; Rebs: Jamar Diggs 7 Asts: Jamar Diggs 8 PIR: Jamar Diggs 28	Boxscore	Pts: Michael Dixon 15; Rebs: Giannoulis Larentzakis, Dimitrios Mavroeidis 6 Asts: Dušan Šakota 4 PIR: Dušan Šakota 21	Arena: Utena Arena; Referees: Zurapovic (BIH), Horozov (BUL), Sahin (ITA)

21 February 2017 2nd Round	AEK Athens (Greece)	75–54 (Series: 153-131)	(Lithuania) Juventus	Athens
19:30 (EET)	Scoring by quarter: 25-9, 12-18, 18-11, 20-16
Nova Sports	Pts: Chinemelu Elonu, Michael Dixon 14; Rebs: Chinemelu Elonu 6 Asts: Michael Dixon 5 PIR: Chinemelu Elonu 24	Boxscore	Pts: Ovidijus Galdikas 11; Rebs: Vytautas Šulskis 11; Asts: Vytautas Šulskis 3 PIR: Vaidas Čepukaitis 15	Arena: Nikos Galis Olympic Indoor Hall; Referees: Dozai (CRO), Difallah (FRA), Maricic (SRB)

==== Round of 16 ====
Win Loss

28 February 2017 1st Round	AEK Athens (Greece)	69–68 (Series: 69-68)	(France) Monaco	Athens
19:30 (EET)	Scoring by quarter: 22-15, 12-20, 16-18, 19-15
Nova Sports	Pts: Dušan Šakota 20; Rebs: Loukas Mavrokefalidis, Chinemelu Elonu 6 Asts: Donnie McGrath 4 PIR: Dušan Šakota 21	Boxscore	Pts: Zackary Wright 11; Rebs: Sergiy Gladyr 6 Asts: Zackary Wright 7 PIR: Zackary Wright 16	Arena: Nikos Galis Olympic Indoor Hall; Referees: Bulto (ESP), Cmikiewicz (POL), Sahin (ITA)

8 March 2017 2nd Round	Monaco (France)	95–87 (Series: 163-156)	(Greece) AEK Athens	Fontvieille
21:30 (EET)	Scoring by quarter: 30-19, 17-21, 28-21, 20-26
Nova Sports	Pts: Jamal Shuler 20; Rebs: Nik Caner-Medley 8 Asts: Zackary Wright 6 PIR: Jamal Shuler 27	Boxscore	Pts: Loukas Mavrokefalidis 18; Rebs: Loukas Mavrokefalidis 12; Asts: Donnie McGrath 7 PIR: Loukas Mavrokefalidis 26	Arena: Salle Gaston Médecin; Referees: Biricik (TUR), Glisic (SRB), Nedovic (SLO)
