= Talton =

Talton is a surname. Notable people with the surname include:

- Alix Talton (1920–1992), American actress
- Brad Talton, American board game designer from Albuquerque, New Mexico
- Chester Talton (born 1941), the Provisional Bishop of the Episcopal Diocese of San Joaquin
- Dijon Talton (born 1989), American producer, actor, singer and director
- Gary Talton (born 1990), American basketball player
- Irvin Talton, Democrat who served in the Louisiana House of Representatives (1880–1884)
- Ken Talton (born 1956), former American football running back
- Robert Talton (born 1945), Republican former member of the Texas House of Representatives
- Tim Talton (1939–2021), American professional baseball player
- Tommy Talton, American guitarist who played with Cowboy, Gregg Allman, and recording sessions
- Tyree Talton (born 1976), former American football defensive back in the NFL and the XFL
- Willie Talton, Republican member of the Georgia General Assembly till 2015

== See also ==
- Talton v. Mayes, 163 U.S. 376 (1896), a United States Supreme Court case that decided that individual rights protections do not apply to tribal government
- Talton Higbee Embry (1897–1946), wealthy aviation enthusiast who co-founded the company leading to Embry-Riddle Aeronautical University
