= Master Plan =

Master Plan, Masterplan or The Master Plan may refer to:

== General usage ==
- Master Plan East or Generalplan Ost, a 1941–1945 Nazi plan for genocide and ethnic cleansing in Central and Eastern Europe
- Master Plan Neighborhood areas in Detroit, urban planning divisions in Detroit, Michigan, US
- California Master Plan for Higher Education, a 1960 postsecondary education plan
- Comprehensive planning in urban planning
- Strategic planning in business
- Providentialism in religion
- Strategy

== Film and television ==
- The Master Plan (1954 film), a British film by Cy Endfield
- The Master Plan (2021 film), a Japanese film
- "The Master Plan" (Parks and Recreation), a television episode
- "The Master Plan" (Stingray), a television episode

== Music ==
- Masterplan (band), a German power metal band

=== Albums ===
- Master Plan (album), by Dave Weckl, or the title song, 1990
- Masterplan (Masterplan album), 2003
- Masterplan (Stefanie Heinzmann album) or the title song, 2008
- The Master Plan (album), by Dream Warriors, or the title song, 1996
- The Masterplan (album), by Oasis, 1998
- The Master Plan, by In Essence, 2003
- The Master Plan, by Tamela Mann, or the title song, 2009

=== Songs ===
- "Masterplan" (song), by Diesel, 1993
- "The Masterplan" (song), by Oasis, 1995
- "Master Plan", by Adam Lambert from For Your Entertainment, 2009
- "Master Plan" or "Who's the Man (With the Master Plan)", by the Kay Gees, 1984
- "Master Plan", by My Morning Jacket from It Still Moves, 2003
- "Masterplan", by the Plasmatics from Beyond the Valley of 1984, 1981
- "The Masterplan", by Diana Brown & Barrie K. Sharpe, 1990

== Other uses ==
- Master Plan, a 2012 board game by Brad Talton

== See also ==
- "Masterplanned", a song by Soulwax from From Deewee, 2017
- Plan (disambiguation)
