= A Fake Artist Goes to New York =

Drawing party game

- Other names: エセ芸術家ニューヨークへ行く
- Designers: Jun Sasaki
- Illustrators: Jun Sasaki
- Publishers: Oink Games
- Publication: 2011; 15 years ago
- Genres: Deduction board game; Party game
- Players: 5–10
- Playing time: 20 minutes
- Age range: 8+

A Fake Artist Goes to New York is a deduction party game about drawing designed by Jun Sasaki (佐々木隼) and published in 2011 by Oink Games. In the game, all players are given the title of a drawing that they create together one line at a time, except one—the Fake Artist—who they attempt to identify.

== Publishing history ==
A Fake Artist Goes to New York was designed by Jun Sasaki and published in both English and Japanese in 2011 by Oink Games. A digital version of the game was released for the Nintendo Switch in December 2021 as part of the Let’s Play! Oink Games digital collection, which was funded by a successful Kickstarter.

== Gameplay ==
A Fake Artist Goes to New York is played over multiple rounds, and a new player takes on the role of the Question Master every round. At the start of each round, the Question Master announces a general category to all players, then chooses a word or "title" that would fit in that category and writes it on all except one title card, where they write an X. The title cards are shuffled and distributed randomly to each of the players. The player who receives the card with the X is the Fake Artist and does not know the drawing's title. Then, each player except the Question Master chooses a coloured marker and take turns drawing one line on a shared drawing paper to make an illustration of the title.

After two drawing rounds, each player points to who they believe is the Fake Artist. If a player other than the Fake Artist is pointed at the most, then the Fake Artist wins. Otherwise the Fake Artist must guess the title, and wins if they guess correctly. If the Fake Artist wins, then both they and the Question Master each receive two points. If the Artists win, they each receive one point. The winner of the game is the first player to obtain 5 points.

== Reception ==
In The Guardian, Keith Stuart described the game as "Pictionary meets Traitors." Wirecutter included A Fake Artist Goes to New York in their 2025 list of the best board games, with James Austin recommending it for high-energy gatherings. Matt Bassil, writing for Dicebreaker, described the game as one of the "best social deduction games to play," noting thats it's "easy-to-learn game of deception that's more family-friendly than most." A Fake Artist Goes to New York was included in IGN's 2024 list of the "Best Secret Identity Games," where Bobby Anhalt wrote that it is a "fun twist on deductive games" and "more challenging... than you might think."
