= Unfathomable =

2021 co-operative board game

- Designers: Tony Fanchi; Corey Konieczka
- Illustrators: Henning Ludvigsen
- Publishers: Fantasy Flight Games
- Publication: 2021; 5 years ago
- Genres: Cooperative game; Deduction game; Eldritch horror game; Strategy game
- Players: 3–6
- Playing time: 120–240 minutes
- Age range: 14+

Unfathomable is an eldritch horror deduction board game designed by Tony Fanchi and Corey Konieczka, and published in 2021 by Fantasy Flight Games. In the game, players attempt to maintain a steamship as it crosses the Atlantic Ocean while being attacked by monsters from the Deep and traitorous players in their midst. It is an adaptation of Battlestar Galactica: The Board Game.

== History ==
The gameplay of Unfathomable was adapted from Battlestar Galactica: The Board Game, a game which was designed by Corey Konieczka and previously published in 2008 by Fantasy Flights Games. Fantasy Flight Games halted production of Battlestar Galactica: The Board Game due to licensing disputes over the Battlestar Galactica brand, later enlisting Konieczka and Tony Fanchi to reinvent the game for their Arkham Horror Files line of board games. Unfathomable was announced in June of 2021 and released in September of that year.

An expansion, Unfathomable: From the Abyss, was released June 2024.

== Gameplay ==
Unfathomable is played on a game board featuring a top-down view of the deck a 1913 steamship, the SS Atlantica, as it travels through the Deep, as well as a Travel Track showing the progress of the voyage and the four Resource Dials (fuel, food, sanity, and souls) needed to keep the ship in operation. Each player plays as a random one of 10 passengers on the ship and begins the game with the corresponding Character Sheet, Feat Card, and Item Card. Each also start with a Loyalty Card that tells them their allegiance–either to humans, cultists, or hybrids–which is kept secret; players will receive an additional Loyalty Card when the ship is halfway along the travel track, which may cause their allegiance to change. The "Keeper of the Tome" and the "Captain" roles are bestowed on the players whose characters are highest on the respective Line of Succession lists.

At the start of each turn, players draw five Skill Cards from a selection of six Skill Card decks–Influence, Lore, Observation, Strength, Treachery, and Will–as determined by their Character Sheet. Each Skill Card has a number which indicates its strength in skill checks. On their turn, a player can take two actions, with repeats, of the following:

- Move to any unoccupied ship space.
- Attack a Deep One on the same space; the player rolls a die and the Deep One is removed from the board if the result is a 4 or higher.
- Rescue a passenger token on the same space, which is then removed from the board.
- Use an action ability listed on their character sheet, item cards, or skill cards, which is revealed to all players and discarded if the card is not in their play area.
- Trade an item card with another player on the same space.
- Reveal their hybrid Loyalty Card, allowing the player to openly sabotage the ship on all following actions.
- If the Keeper of the Tome, draw two Spell Cards and resolve the action for one.

At the end of each player's turn, a Mythos Card is drawn to cause a crisis for the ship, which occurs as either a choice between two bad options or a skill check where players contribute Skill Cards to meet a minimum strength in specific skills. During a skill check, players secretly add as many Skill Cards to a pile as they want to contribute, and the Skill Cards from the pile, along with two random cards from a "Chaos Deck" of cards from all six Skill Card decks, are tallied to see if the total strength of the required skills exceeds the needed amount. Each Mythos card also has two symbols, which indicate which track to move forward (the Travel Track, Ritual Track, or both) and which monster to activate. There are three monsters: Father Dragon (who adds Deep Ones to spaces around him), Mother Hydra (who damages the ship), and the Deep Ones (who can move, attack, or damage the ship). If a monster attacking a player rolls a 6 or higher, that player is then defeated and sent to the Sick Bay, where they can only draw one Skill Card on their next turn. If the Ritual Track reaches the end, all monsters are sent to the Deep, all passenger tokens are defeated and removed, and all players are sent to the Sick Bay.

When the ship reaches the various waypoints along the Travel Track, the Captain draws two Waypoint Cards with different distance values and duel costs, then chooses one. Human players win if the SS Atlantica travels a total distance of 12 or more and then reaches one more waypoint. Hybrid players win the game if any of the Resource Dials reaches zero, there are six Damage Cards on the ship at once, or if there are not enough Deep One figures to be placed on the board. Cultist players win if the SS Atlantica travels a total distance of 12 and then a Hybrid win condition is met.

== Reception ==
Charlie Hall, writing for Polygon, described Unfathomable as a "tremendously well-conceived upgrade" from the original, Battlestar Galactica: The Board Game, for the behaviour of the Deep Ones compared to the Cylons and the tightened gameplay, but criticized the graphic design of the game cards for being text-heavy and un-cohesive. In an article for Dicebreaker, Samantha Nelson expressed that "it streamlines some of the original game’s issues", but was heavily critical that the game "doesn’t do enough to incorporate innovations in the social deduction genre made in the last 13 years" and "doesn’t do enough to distinguish itself from the many other Cthulhu board games and social deduction games on the market". IGN rated the game 8/10 stars, with Matthew Adler writing that "Unfathomable offers a rewarding experience for those willing to sit through its often lengthy play sessions", noting that "the sheer number of actions available can be overwhelming... but also what gives it a near-infinite amount of replayability and such a high skill ceiling".
