= Battlestar Galactica: The Board Game =

2008 co-operative board game

- Cover of Battlestar Galactica: The Board Game
- Designers: Corey Konieczka
- Publishers: Fantasy Flight Games
- Publication: 2008
- Genres: Board game
- Languages: English, German, French, Spanish, Polish, Italian, Chinese
- Players: Base game: 3–6 players (additional possible with certain expansions)
- Setup time: Base game: 10 minutes (+ 5 minutes with expansions)
- Playing time: Base game: 120–240 minutes (first time could be double)
- Chance: Some
- Skills: Bluffing, Co-operative Play, Deduction, Dice Rolling, Negotiation, Hand Management
- Website: Official website

Battlestar Galactica: The Board Game is a board game created by Corey Konieczka and first published by Fantasy Flight Games in 2008 based on the 2004 Battlestar Galactica series. Players take the roles of characters from the series, trying to guide the Galactica and its fleet to its destination, while combating the Cylons and other crises threatening it. One or more players are secretly enemy Cylons, who win if the humans fail to achieve their objective.

== Gameplay ==
Battlestar Galactica is a semi-cooperative game for 3–6 players. Players play as one of ten possible characters, classed as 'Political Leaders', 'Military Leaders', 'Pilots', or 'Support', each character having benefits and drawbacks. Player are secretly dealt one loyalty card at the start of the game which determines whether the players are human or Cylon and therefore whether they win or lose if the humans achieve their goal. Simulating the activation of a sleeper agent in the television series who did not realise she was a Cylon, players draw a second card midway through, which may turn them to the Cylon side. A hidden Cylon player can covertly disrupt the humans' plans, meaning that, for the humans, deducing who is secretly an enemy agent is a critical part of the game. Players can send suspected Cylons to Galactica's brig and a revealed Cylon can still be disruptive after returning to their home fleet via the Resurrection Ship.

Players move around Galactica and Colonial One as well as piloting Vipers in space around the main ship. The aim of the game for human players is to jump the fleet several times so as to reach the planet of Kobol, without Galactica being destroyed or running out of fuel, food, morale or population. Players are continually harassed by Cylon ships which will threaten the Galactica or civilian ships if not destroyed or evaded. Cards feature images from the series and reference events from the show's first season.

Players can gain and lose the titles of Admiral and President, which give them additional powers and control over certain decisions.

== Expansions and reimplementation ==
Three expansions were released: Pegasus (2009), Exodus (2010), and Daybreak (2013). Each expansion adds new cards to the various decks, as well as adding new characters, a new endgame (New Caprica, the Ionian Nebula, and Earth), and several new mechanics, such as the Battlestar Pegasus, the Final Five Cylons, and the explorer ship Demetrius. Thematically, Pegasus, Exodus, and Daybreak respectively add content relating to the show's second, third and fourth seasons.

In 2021, Fantasy Flight Games published the horror-themed Unfathomable which reimplemented many of the mechanics of Battlestar Galactica.
