= Omiros Netzipoglou =

Greek basketball player

- Netzipoglou with Olympiacos in 2026

No. 21 – Olympiacos
- Position: Shooting guard / small forward
- League: Greek Basketball League; EuroLeague

Personal information
- Born: November 18, 2002 (age 23) Thessaloniki, Greece
- Listed height: 1.95 m (6 ft 5 in)
- Listed weight: 82 kg (181 lb)

Career information
- Playing career: 2019–present

Career history
- 2019–2023: Aris Thessaloniki
- 2023–2025: AEK Athens
- 2025–present: Olympiacos

Career highlights
- EuroLeague champion (2026); Greek League champion (2026); 2× Greek Super Cup winner (2025, 2026); Greek League Best Young Player (2022); 2× Greek All-Star (2022, 2023)

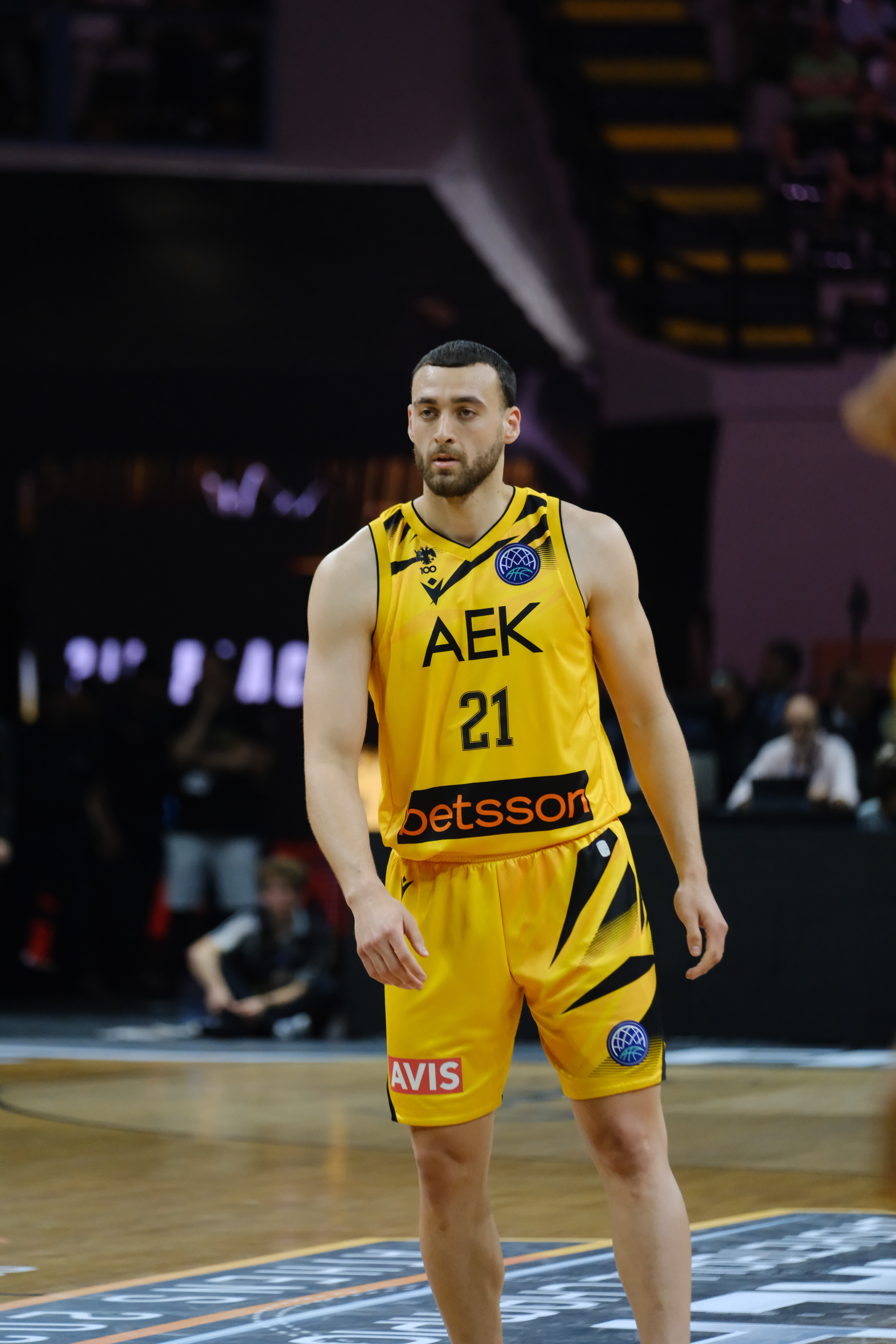
Netzipoglou with AEK Athens in 2025

Omiros Netzipoglou (Greek: Όμηρος Νετζήπογλου, born November 18, 2002) is a Greek professional basketball player for Olympiacos of the Greek Basketball League and the EuroLeague. He plays at the shooting guard position.

== Early life and career ==
He grew up in Kordelio, Thessaloniki, and is of Pomak descent. His birth name is Omer Necip Oglu. He joined Aris Thessaloniki amateur team in 2017 and managed to win two championships with the club from Thessaloniki.

== Professional career ==
Netzipoglou began his pro career in the Greek Basketball League with Aris Thessaloniki, in the 2019–20 season. He debuted in Greece's top-tier level, with Aris, in a game against Kolossos Rodou, scoring 4 points. He was named the Greek League Best Young Player for the 2021–2022 season.

On July 11, 2023, Netzipoglou joined AEK Athens of the Greek Basketball League. During his first season with the club, he averaged 7.6 points, 2.4 rebounds and 1 assists per game in the Greek Basketball League.

On July 12, 2025, Netzipoglou signed a four-year contract with Olympiacos.
