= Brad Talton =

American board game designer

David Brad Talton Jr. is a prolific American board game designer from Albuquerque, New Mexico, who runs the company Level 99 Games.

Talton has designed over 100 board games or game items since the year 2010. His number of game designs took off when he discovered Kickstarter as he thought that his game ideas were good enough to be placed on this crowdfunding platform. He considers the human component to be the most important aspect when designing and playing a game as he try to think about the ways that players will react with the a specific game. He is known as a fan of card play, theme, characters having special abilities, integrating aspects of video games, and creating board game expansions.

Talton lived in Japan for a year where he attended Kwansei Gakuin University. He graduated from the University of North Carolina at Chapel Hill with a bachelor's degree in computer science and briefly worked as a software engineer.

Games that Brad Talton has designed or co-designed include the following:

- 2010 BattleCON: War of Indines, several versions of this game have been created.
- 2012 Pixel Tactics, a tactical combat game for two players
- 2012 Master Plan, a storytelling game
- 2012 Blades of Legend, a social deduction board game
- 2012 Kill the Overlord, a "take that" game not published by Level 99 Games
- 2012 NOIR: Deductive Mystery Game, a two-player deduction game
- 2013 Disc Duelers, a dexterity game
- 2013 7-Card Slugfest, a fast-playing card game
- 2016 Millennium Blades, a game about collecting a collectible card game
