= Chrysostomos Sandramanis =

Greek basketball player

AOK Chania
- Position: Shooting guard / point guard
- League: Greek 3rd division

Personal information
- Born: April 5, 2000 (age 26) Alexandroupolis, Greece
- Listed height: 6 ft 5 in (1.96 m)
- Listed weight: 200 lb (91 kg)

Career information
- Playing career: 2016–present

Career history
- 2016–2019: Promitheas Patras
- 2019: Ionikos Nikaias
- 2019: Karditsa
- 2019–2020: Aris Thessaloniki
- 2020–present: Chania

Chrysostomos Sandramanis (Greek: Χρυσόστομος Σανδραμάνης; born April 5, 2000) is a Greek professional basketball player for Chania of the Greek 3rd division. He is 1.96 m (6 ft 5 in) tall, and he plays at the point guard and shooting guard positions.

== Professional career ==
Sandramanis began his pro career in 2016, during the 2015–16 season, with Promitheas Patras, in the Greek 2nd Division. In the 2017–18 season, he made his debut in Greece's top-tier level, the Greek Basket League. In the 2018–19 season, he played in a European-wide league for the first time, as he debuted in one of the two European secondary leagues, the FIBA Champions League. After a brief try-out period with Ionikos Nikaias, Sandramanis signed with Karditsa on September 23, 2019. In December of the same year, he moved back to the Greek 1st division, joining Aris Thessaloniki. On August 19, 2020, he signed with Chania.

== National team career ==
Sandramanis has been a member of the junior national teams of Greece. With Greece's junior national teams, he played at the 2016 FIBA Under-16 European Championship, the 2018 FIBA Under-18 European Championship, and at the 2019 FIBA Under-19 World Cup.
