= Georgios Georgakis =

Greek professional basketball player

Georgios Georgakis Γιώργος Γεωργάκης
Free agent
- Position: Center

Personal information
- Born: 18 March 1991 (age 35) Maroussi, Athens, Greece
- Listed height: 6 ft 8.75 in (2.05 m)
- Listed weight: 250 lb (113 kg)

Career information
- NBA draft: 2013: undrafted
- Playing career: 2010–present

Career history
- 2010–2012: Kavala
- 2012–2013: Olympiacos
- 2013–2014: Trikala Aries
- 2014–2015: KAOD
- 2015–2016: Koroivos
- 2016–2017: Doxa Lefkadas
- 2017–2018: Iraklis Thessaloniki
- 2018–2019: Kolossos Rodou
- 2020–2021: Aris Thessaloniki

Career highlights
- EuroLeague champion (2013)
Medals
Men's basketball
Representing Greece
FIBA Under-19 World Cup
Silver medal – second place	2009 New Zealand	Under-19
FIBA Europe Under-20 Championship
Silver medal – second place	2010 Croatia	Under-20
FIBA Europe Under-18 Championship
Gold medal – first place	2008 Greece	Under-18

Georgios Georgakis (alternate spellings: Giorgos, George, Yiorgos) (Greek: Γιώργος Γεωργάκης; born 18 March 1991 in Maroussi, Athens, Greece) is a Greek professional basketball player who last played for Aris of the Greek Basket League. He is a 2.05 m (6 ft 8 3/4 in) tall center.

== Professional career ==
Georgakis began his professional career with the Greek Basket League club Kavala in 2010. In 2012, he signed with Olympiacos. With Olympiacos, he won the EuroLeague championship in 2013.

In 2013, he moved to the Greek club Trikala Aries. After that, he played with the Greek clubs KAOD, Koroivos, Doxa Lefkadas, Iraklis, and Kolossos Rodou. In January 2020, Georgakis signed with Aris Thessaloniki.

== National team career ==
With the junior national teams of Greece, Georgakis played at the following tournaments: the 2006 FIBA Europe Under-16 Championship, the 2007 FIBA Europe Under-16 Championship, the 2008 FIBA Europe Under-18 Championship, the 2009 FIBA Under-19 World Cup, the 2009 FIBA Europe Under-18 Championship, the 2010 FIBA Europe Under-20 Championship, and the 2011 FIBA Europe Under-20 Championship.

He won the gold medal at the 2008 FIBA Europe Under-18 Championship, the silver medal at the 2009 FIBA Under-19 World Cup, and the silver medal at the 2010 FIBA Europe Under-20 Championship.
