= Vladimir Dragičević =

Montenegrin basketball player

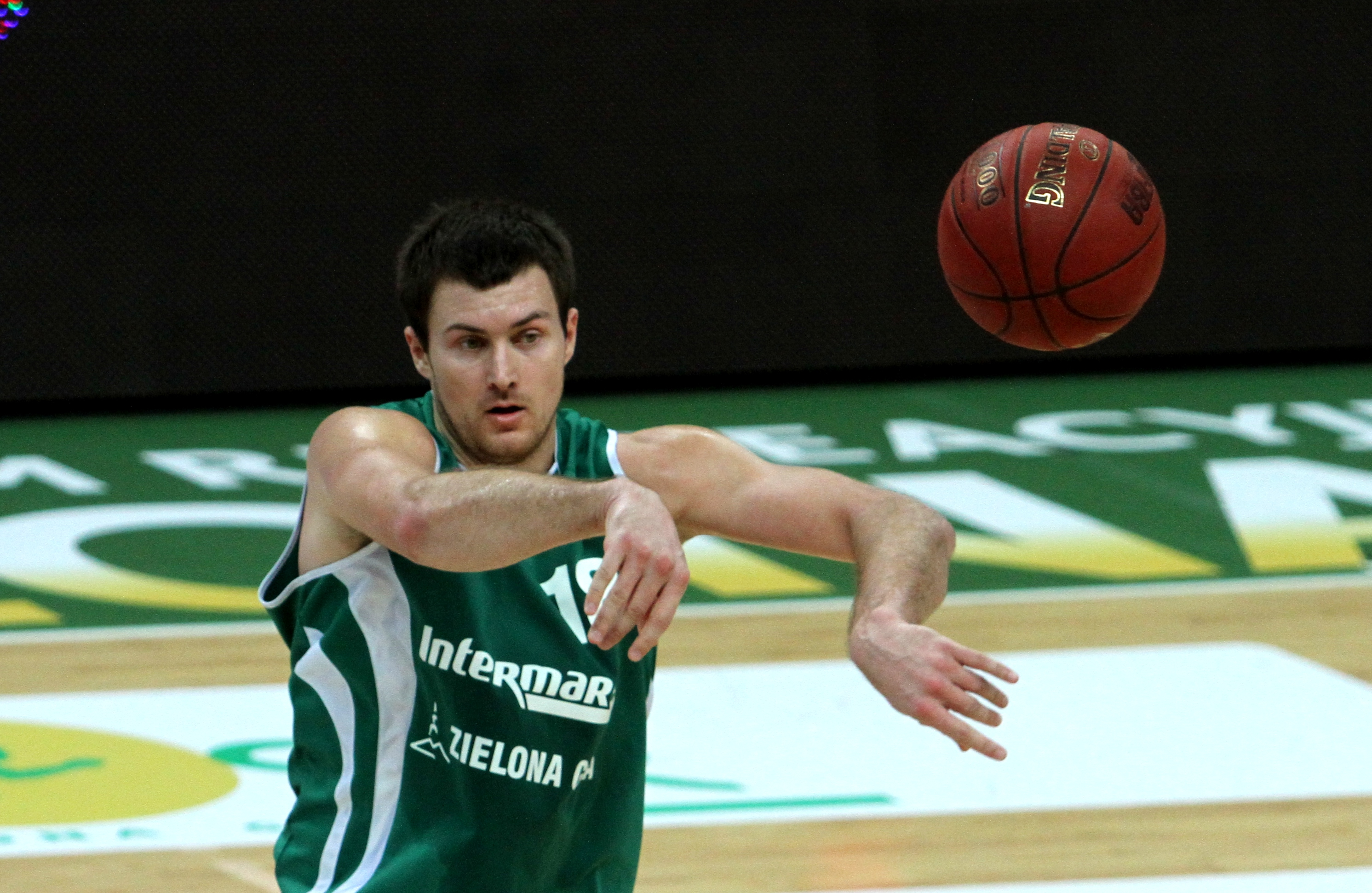
- Dragičević with Zielona Góra

Personal information
- Born: May 30, 1986 (age 40) Cetinje, SR Montenegro, SFR Yugoslavia
- Listed height: 2.06 m (6 ft 9 in)
- Listed weight: 100 kg (220 lb)

Career information
- NBA draft: 2008: undrafted
- Playing career: 2004–2021
- Position: Power forward / center
- Number: 18

Career history
- 2004–2007: Lovćen Cetinje
- 2007–2011: Budućnost Podgorica
- 2011: Caja Laboral
- 2011–2013: Spartak Saint Petersburg
- 2013–2014: Stelmet Zielona Góra
- 2014–2015: Banvit
- 2015–2016: TED Ankara Kolejliler
- 2016–2018: Stelmet Zielona Góra
- 2018–2019: Nizhny Novgorod
- 2019–2021: Aris Thessaloniki

Career highlights
- 4x All-PLK Team (2014, 2017, 2018, 2019); 3× Montenegrin League champion (2008–2010); 4× Montenegrin Cup champion (2008–2011)

Vladimir Dragičević (Serbian Cyrillic: Владимир Драгичевић; born May 30, 1986) is a retired Montenegrin professional basketball player who last played for Aris of the Greek Basket League.

== Professional career ==
Dragičević made his senior debut with Lovćen Cetinje and later played for Budućnost Podgorica. In April 2011, he signed with Caja Laboral of the Spanish ACB League for the rest of the 2010–11 season.

In July 2011, Dragičević signed a two-year deal with Spartak Saint Petersburg of Russia.

In October 2013, he signed with Stelmet Zielona Góra of Poland for the 2013–14 season. In November 2013, he was named Euroleague MVP for Round 6.

In September 2014, he signed a one-year deal with Banvit. For the next season, he moved to TED Ankara Kolejliler.

On November 20, 2016, he re-signed with Stelmet Zielona Góra.

== Montenegro national team ==
Dragičević played for the Montenegro national basketball team at the FIBA EuroBasket 2011.

== Career statistics ==
Legend
GP	Games played	GS	Games started	MPG	Minutes per game
FG%	Field-goal percentage	3P%	3-point field-goal percentage	FT%	Free-throw percentage
RPG	Rebounds per game	APG	Assists per game	SPG	Steals per game
BPG	Blocks per game	PPG	Points per game	PIR	Performance index rating
**Bold**	Career high

=== EuroLeague ===
Year	Team	GP	GS	MPG	FG%	3P%	FT%	RPG	APG	SPG	BPG	PPG	PIR
2013–14	Zielona Góra	10	9	27.9	.641	.000	.577	6.7	1.5	.6	.9	14.7	18.7
Career		10	9	27.9	.641	.000	.577	6.7	1.5	.6	.9	14.7	18.7
