= Jaylen Morris =

American basketball player (born 1995)

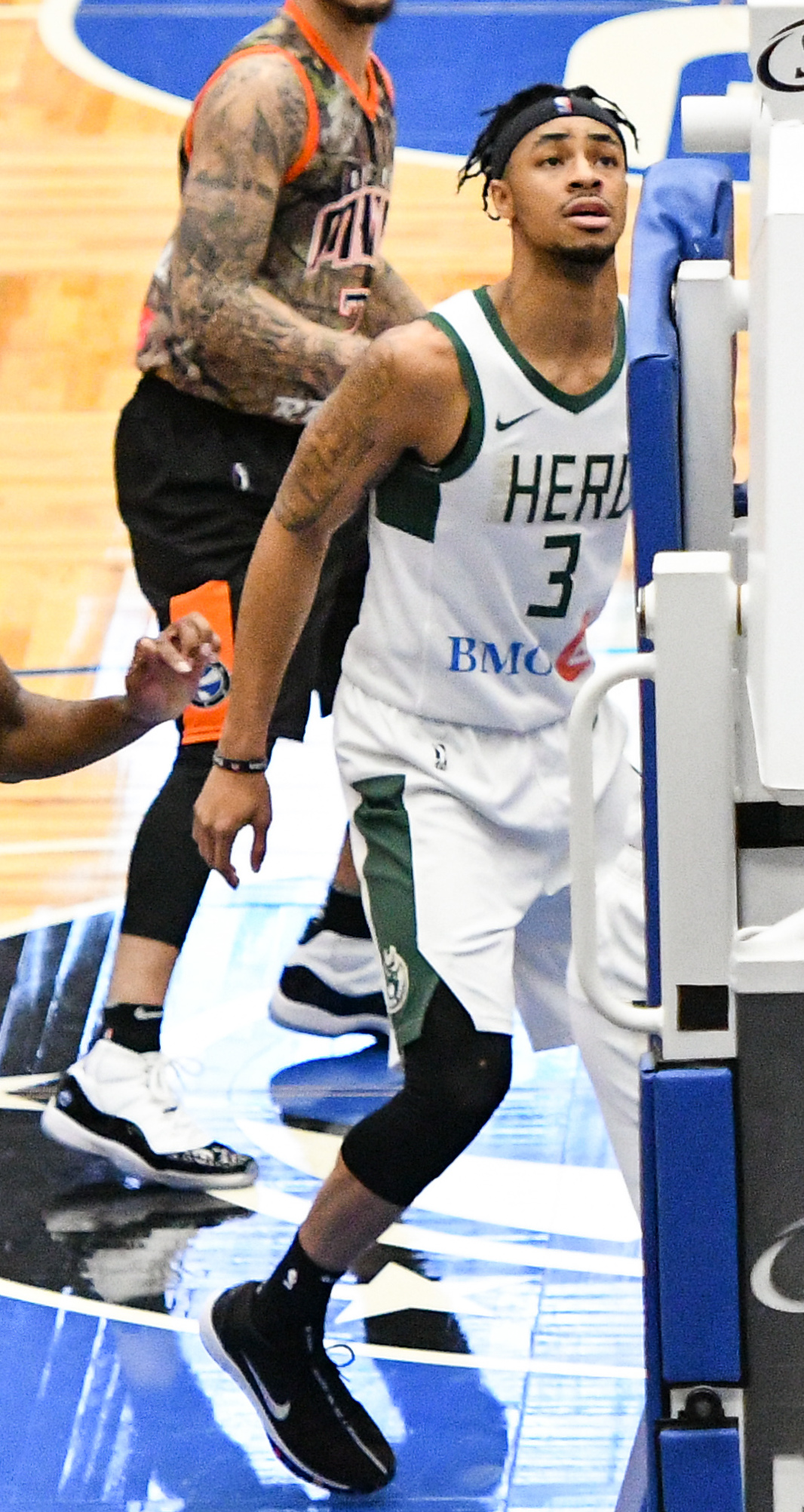

Daemen Wildcats
- Title: Assistant coach
- Conference: East Coast Conference

Personal information
- Born: September 19, 1995 (age 31) Amherst, New York, U.S.
- Listed height: 6 ft 5 in (1.96 m)
- Listed weight: 185 lb (84 kg)

Career information
- High school: St. Joseph's Collegiate Institute (Buffalo, New York)
- College: Molloy (2013–2017)
- NBA draft: 2017: undrafted
- Playing career: 2017–2023
- Position: Shooting guard / small forward
- Number: 3, 30, 16
- Coaching career: 2024–present

Career history

Playing
- 2017–2018: Erie BayHawks
- 2018: Atlanta Hawks
- 2018–2019: Milwaukee Bucks
- 2018–2019: →Wisconsin Herd
- 2019: Erie BayHawks
- 2019–2020: Aris Thessaloniki
- 2020: Bnei Herzliya
- 2021: Iowa Wolves
- 2021: Austin Spurs
- 2022: San Antonio Spurs
- 2022: Austin Spurs
- 2023: Raptors 905

Coaching
- 2024–present: Daemen (assistant)

Career highlights
- First-team All-ECC (2017); Third-team All-ECC (2016)
- Stats at NBA.com
- Stats at Basketball Reference

Jaylen Morris (born September 19, 1995) is an American former professional basketball player who played parts of three seasons in the National Basketball Association (NBA). He played college basketball for Molloy College in NCAA Division II. He is currently an assistant coach for Daemen University, and a trainer at Darren Fenn's XGen Elite basketball academy in West Seneca.

== Early life and college career ==
Morris attended high school at St. Joseph's Collegiate Institute in Buffalo, New York. During his senior year, he was an honorable mention for the All-Western New York team and named Mr. Defense for being the best defensive player in New York State. With no scholarship offers, he decided to go to Molloy College where his father Patrick was assistant coach.

Following his sophomore year at Molloy College, Morris received an East Coast Conference All-Conference Honorable Mention. He was named to the All-ECC Third-team and All-Met Second-team following his junior year, Morris received All-ECC First-team honors following his senior year. During his senior season, he became the second-highest scorer for the team, averaging 19.9 points per game.

== Professional career ==
=== Erie BayHawks (2017–2018) ===
After going undrafted in the 2017 NBA draft, Morris worked out with the Long Island Nets, leading to him being drafted 41st overall in the 2017 NBA G League Draft by the Erie BayHawks.

=== Atlanta Hawks (2018) ===
On February 28, 2018, he signed a 10-day contract with the Atlanta Hawks. Morris made his NBA debut that same day in a 107–102 win over the Indiana Pacers. In his debut, Morris recorded 2 points and 2 rebounds in 11 minutes of action. After his initial 10-day contract expired, he signed a second 10-day contract with the Hawks on March 11, 2018. During that night's game, he would end up injuring his ankle. Despite the injury, Morris would ultimately sign with the Hawks for the rest of the season on March 21, 2018. He was waived on July 19, 2018.

=== Milwaukee Bucks (2018–2019) ===
On July 22, 2018, Morris signed a deal with the Italian club Auxilium Pallacanestro Torino. He opted out of the deal with Auxilium Pallacanestro Torino on July 31, 2018, in order to sign a two-way contract with the Milwaukee Bucks. On January 13, 2019, the Bucks requested waivers on Morris.

=== Return to Erie (2019) ===
On January 31, 2019, the Erie BayHawks announced that they had added Morris to their roster.

=== Aris (2019–2020) ===
On September 25, 2019, Aris Thessaloniki announced that Morris had joined their club for the 2019–2020 season. He averaged 9.9 points, 3.8 rebounds and 1.3 assists per game.

=== Bnei Herzliya (2020) ===
On October 27, 2020, Morris signed a one-month deal with Bnei Herzliya of the Israeli National League.

=== Iowa Wolves (2021) ===
Morris joined the Iowa Wolves of the G League for their 2021 campaign. He was waived by the Wolves on February 12 after one game with the team.

=== Austin Spurs (2021) ===
Morris was claimed by the Austin Spurs on February 14, 2021. On February 25, he was released following a season-ending injury.

On October 8, 2021, Morris signed with the San Antonio Spurs, but was released prior to the start of the season. On October 27, 2021, he re-signed with the Austin Spurs.

=== San Antonio Spurs (2022) ===
On January 1, 2022, Morris signed a 10-day contract with the San Antonio Spurs via the hardship exemption.

=== Return to Austin (2022) ===
On January 11, 2022, Morris was reacquired by the Austin Spurs.

=== Raptors 905 (2023) ===
On October 30, 2023, Morris joined Raptors 905, but was later waived on December 9, 2023.

== Coaching career ==
Morris was announced as assistant coach for Daemen University under Mike MacDonald on October 3, 2024.

He was hired on October 18, 2024, as a trainer for Darren Fenn's XGen Elite basketball academy in West Seneca.

== NBA career statistics ==
Legend
GP	Games played	GS	Games started	MPG	Minutes per game
FG%	Field goal percentage	3P%	3-point field goal percentage	FT%	Free throw percentage
RPG	Rebounds per game	APG	Assists per game	SPG	Steals per game
BPG	Blocks per game	PPG	Points per game	**Bold**	Career high

=== Regular season ===
Year	Team	GP	GS	MPG	FG%	3P%	FT%	RPG	APG	SPG	BPG	PPG
2017–18	Atlanta	**6**	0	**16.4**	**.406**	.200	–	**2.7**	**1.2**	.3	**.2**	**4.7**
2018–19	Milwaukee	4	0	7.1	.400	**.333**	**.500**	1.3	1.0	**.5**	.0	2.5
2021–22	San Antonio	3	0	5.3	.000	.000	**.500**	.7	.7	.0	.0	.7
Career		13	0	11.0	.354	.200	.500	1.8	1.0	.3	.1	3.1
