= Dimitris Flionis =

Greek basketball player

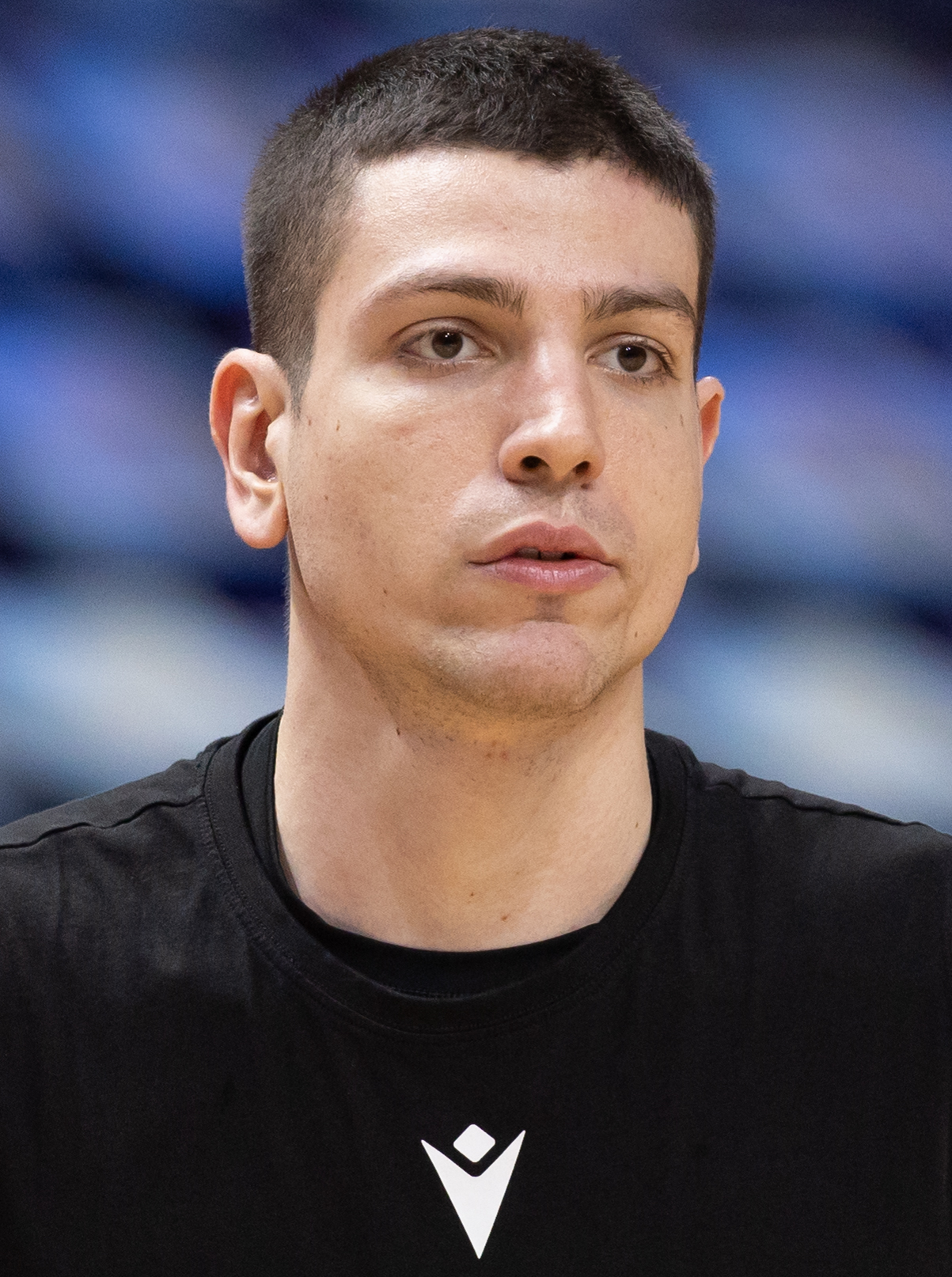
- Flionis with AEK Athens in 2026

No. 7 – AEK Athens
- Position: Shooting guard / point guard
- League: Greek Basketball League

Personal information
- Born: April 8, 1997 (age 29) Thessaloniki, Greece
- Listed height: 6 ft 2.75 in (1.90 m)
- Listed weight: 185 lb (84 kg)

Career information
- Playing career: 2015–present

Career history
- 2015–2021: Aris Thessaloniki
- 2021–present: AEK Athens
Medals
Representing Greece
Men's basketball
FIBA Europe Under-20 Championship
Gold medal – first place	2017 Greece	National Team
FIBA Europe Under-18 Championship
Gold medal – first place	2015 Greece	National Team
FIBA Europe Under-16 Championship
Bronze medal – third place	2013 Ukraine	National Team

Dimitris Flionis (alternate spelling: Dimitrios) (Greek: Δημήτρης Φλιώνης; born April 8, 1997) is a Greek professional basketball player and the team captain for AEK Athens of the Greek Basketball League. He is a 1.90 m (6 ft 2 3/4 in) tall point guard.

== Professional career ==
Flionis began playing basketball with the junior youth teams of Aris Thessaloniki. He began his pro career with the senior men's team of Aris in 2015, by playing in his first career official game at the pro level, during the Greek Basket League 2014–15 season's playoffs. On June 30, 2018, Aris announced that they had rescinded their contract extension offer towards Flionis. However, four days later, on July 3, the team and the player officially agreed on a new two-year deal.

During the 2019–20 season, Flionis averaged 4.1 points, 2.2 rebounds and 2.1 assists per game. He re-signed with Aris on September 21, 2020. He went on to average 5.4 points, 2.7 rebounds, and 2.8 assists during the 2020–21 season.

On August 12, 2021, Flionis signed a two-year deal with AEK Athens. On March 18, 2022, he renewed his contract through 2025. In 23 league games, he averaged 6 points, 3.6 rebounds, 1.6 assists and 1 steal, playing around 24 minutes per contest. On March 22, 2022, he renewed his contract with the club until 2025.

During the 2022–2023 season, in 19 league games, he averaged 7.1 points, 3.6 rebounds, 2.9 assists and 1 steal, playing around 22 minutes per contest. He had his best performance of the season in an 81–71 win against Galatasaray, on January 31, 2023, where he had 11 points, 10 rebounds and 9 assists.

On July 25, 2025, Flionis renewed his contract with AEK for three more seasons. On August 22. 2026, he extended his contract with the club until 2029.

Since 2023, he is the team captain for AEK.

== Greece national team ==
Flionis was included in the Greece junior national teams for the 2013 FIBA Europe Under-16 Championship, where they won a bronze medal, for the 2014 FIBA Under-17 World Cup, and for the 2015 FIBA Europe Under-18 Championship, where they won a gold medal. He also played at the 2017 FIBA Europe Under-20 Championship, where they won a gold medal.
