= Ken Brown (basketball) =

American basketball player

FUS Rabat
- Position: Point guard
- League: Division Excellence; BAL

Personal information
- Born: October 24, 1989 (age 37) St. Louis, Missouri, U.S.
- Listed height: 5 ft 9 in (1.75 m)
- Listed weight: 165 lb (75 kg)

Career information
- High school: Soldan (St. Louis, Missouri)
- College: Southwest Tennessee CC (2008–2009); Cerritos College (2009–2010); Western Kentucky (2010–2011); Philander Smith (2011–2012)
- NBA draft: 2012: undrafted
- Playing career: 2012–present

Career history
- 2012–2013: Jūrmala
- 2013–2014: Norrköping Dolphins
- 2014: Trepça
- 2014–2015: MKS Dąbrowa Górnicza
- 2015: Donar
- 2016: Lietuvos rytas
- 2016: Koroivos Amaliadas
- 2016–2017: Al Riyadi Beirut
- 2017–2018: Aurora Basket Jesi
- 2018: VEF Rīga
- 2018: Indios de San Francisco de Macorís
- 2018: Dzūkija
- 2019: Parma
- 2019: Nantes
- 2019: Lietkabelis Panevėžys
- 2019–2020: Aris Thessaloniki
- 2020–2021: Larisa
- 2021: Atomerőmű SE
- 2022: Plateros de Fresnillo
- 2022–2023: Trepça
- 2023: Al-Ittihad
- 2024–present: FUS Rabat

Career highlights
- Kosovo Cup (2023); LNBP All-Star (2022); Greek League All Star (2020); Lebanese League champion (2017); King Mindaugas Cup winner (2016)

Kendrick Shamar Brown (born October 24, 1989) is an American professional basketball player for FUS Rabat of the Basketball Africa League (BAL) and Division Excellence. He plays at the point guard position.

== High school career ==
Brown played high school basketball at Soldan High School in St. Louis, Missouri. He was ranked as the No. 206 player in Missouri.

== Professional career ==
After going undrafted in the 2012 NBA draft, Brown signed with the Latvian club Jūrmala for the 2012–13 Latvian Basketball League season. The following season, he joined Norrköping Dolphins of the Swedish Basketligan.

For the 2015–16 season, Brown signed with Donar Groningen. On October 6, 2015, he recorded a triple double in a 122–57 win against BS Weert, with 18 points, 17 assists and 10 rebounds. On December 14, Donar bought Brown out.

In January 2016, Brown signed with BC Lietuvos rytas in Lithuania. On June 20, he left the team.

On July 19, 2016, Brown signed with Koroivos Amaliadas of the Greek Basket League. He left Koroivos after appearing in twelve games. On December 28, 2016, he signed with Al Riyadi Beirut of the Lebanese Basketball League.

On July 13, 2017, Brown signed with Aurora Basket Jesi on the Italian second division (Serie A2 East). On January 9, 2018, he parted ways with Jesi after averaging 19.3 points, 3.7 rebounds and 4.6 assists per game. Seven days later, he signed with Latvian club VEF Rīga for the rest of the season.

Brown signed with Lithuanian team Dzūkija on August 22, 2018.

In the 2018–19 season, Brown played with Russian club BC Parma of the VTB United League. On May 21, 2019, Brown signed with Nantes of the French LNB Pro B, the national second-tier league. The signing was remarkable as Brown was signed for the last game of the season for Nantes. He went on to score 13 points in his only match with the team.

On July 28, 2019, Brown returned to Lithuania by signing with Lietkabelis.

On November 28, 2019, Brown signed with Aris Thessaloniki in Greece. He averaged 13.7 points and 3.2 assists per game. On September 10, 2020, Brown signed with Larisa. On April 3, 2021, Brown parted ways with the Greek club.

On July 2, 2021, Brown signed with Atomerőmű SE of the Hungarian Nemzeti Bajnokság I/A.

In January 2023, Brown signed with KB Trepça in Kosovo.

On January 20, 2024, Brown was announced by FUS Rabat, the defending champions of Morocco.
