= Toarlyn Fitzpatrick =

American basketball player (born 1989)

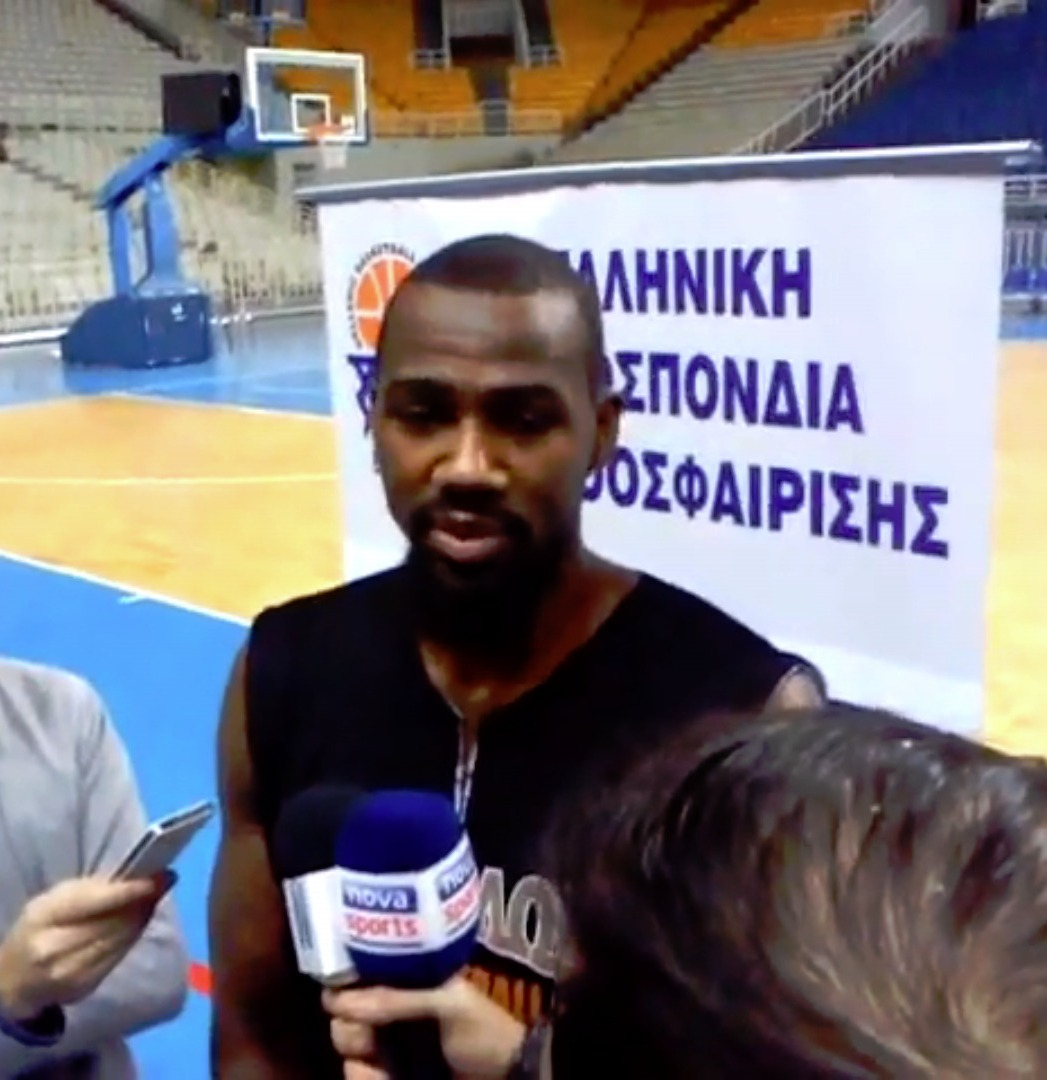
- Fitzpatrick with Apollon Patras

No. 32 – Rapid București
- Position: Power forward / center
- League: Liga Națională

Personal information
- Born: September 4, 1989 (age 37) Tampa Bay, Florida, U.S.
- Listed height: 6 ft 9 in (2.06 m)
- Listed weight: 250 lb (113 kg)

Career information
- High school: C. Leon King (Tampa, Florida)
- College: South Florida (2009–2013)
- NBA draft: 2013: undrafted
- Playing career: 2013–present

Career history
- 2013–2014: Kangoeroes Willebroek
- 2014–2015: Apollon Patras
- 2015–2016: Tigers Tübingen
- 2016–2017: Rethymno Cretan Kings
- 2017: Akita Northern Happinets
- 2018: Cyberdyne Ibaraki Robots
- 2018–2019: Holargos
- 2019: ESSM Le Portel
- 2019–2020: Aris Thessaloniki
- 2020: Ionikos Nikaias
- 2020–2022: BCM U Pitești
- 2022–2023: Hapoel Afula
- 2023–present: Rapid București

Career highlights
- Greek Cup Finals Top Scorer (2015)

Toarlyn Lavon Fitzpatrick (born September 4, 1989), nicknamed Fitz, is an American professional basketball player for Rapid București of the Liga Națională.

== High school career ==
Fitzpatrick played high school basketball at C. Leon King High School in Tampa, Florida.

== College career ==
After high school, Fitzpatrick played college basketball at South Florida University, with the South Florida Bulls, from 2009 to 2013.

== College statistics ==
Year	Team	GP	GS	MPG	FG%	3P%	FT%	RPG	APG	SPG	BPG	PPG
2009–10	South Florida	33	22	22.1	.398	.300	.552	4.48	0.36	0.61	0.97	4.27
2010–11	South Florida	33	6	14.2	.422	.344	.733	4.09	0.52	0.39	0.55	4.30
2011–12	South Florida	35	11	25.5	.443	.412	.688	6.43	0.89	0.71	1.00	7.97
2012–13	South Florida	31	31	34.4	.375	.320	.700	5.26	0.94	0.81	0.87	9.90
Career		132	70	23.9	.406	.351	.660	5.08	0.67	0.63	0.85	6.58

== Professional career ==
Fitzpatrick began his pro career in the 2013–14 season in Belgium, with the Belgian League club Kangoeroes Willebroek. He moved to Greece for the 2014–15 season, to play in the Greek League with Apollon Patras.

He then moved to Germany for the 2015–16 season, to play with the German League club Walter Tigers.

On May 27, 2016, Fitzpatrick returned to Greece and signed a 1+1 year deal with Rethymno Cretan Kings.

On July 31, 2017, he signed with Akita Northern Happinets of the Japanese B.League, $60,000 buyout to Rethymno Cretan Kings. In 2018 he moved to the Cyberdyne Ibaraki Robots.

On July 19, 2018, Fitzpatrick returned to Greece once more, this time for Holargos, where he eventually became the team captain.

On July 25, 2019, he signed with ESSM Le Portel of the French LNB Pro A.

On November 21, 2019, Fitzpatrick returned to Greece for Aris.

On September 9, 2020, Fitzpatrick signed with Ionikos Nikaias, his fifth club in Greece. On January 11, 2021, Fitzpatrick amicably parted ways with the Greek club, pending a better financial offer from abroad.

On January 12, 2021, Fitzpatrick signed with BCM U Pitești.

=== The Basketball Tournament ===
In 2017, Fitzpatrick competed in The Basketball Tournament with the Tampa Bulls, a team made up of USF alumni. Fitzpatrick's team made it to the Sweet 16 where they were eliminated by eventual champions Overseas Elite.

== Personal life ==
In July 2018, Toarlyn Fitzpatrick married Greek volleyball player, Stella Tselidis. Their divorce was finalized in January 2021.

Fitzpatrick has a son from a previous relationship.

== Career statistics ==
Legend
GP	Games played	GS	Games started	MPG	Minutes per game
FG%	Field goal percentage	3P%	3-point field goal percentage	FT%	Free throw percentage
RPG	Rebounds per game	APG	Assists per game	SPG	Steals per game
BPG	Blocks per game	PPG	Points per game	**Bold**	Career high

=== Regular season ===
Year	Team	GP	GS	MPG	FG%	3P%	FT%	RPG	APG	SPG	BPG	PPG
2013–14	Willebroek	36	15	16.6	.447	.344	.655	4.14	0.75	0.36	0.19	7.75
2014–15	Patras	26	23	27.0	.397	.333	.659	7.31	1.15	0.92	1.12	11.12
2015–16	Tübingen	34	14	22.5	.441	.328	.674	4.26	1.03	0.71	0.44	8.59
2016–17	Rethymno	31	26	27.9	.440	.377	.672	6.74	2.03	0.81	0.90	12.16
2017–18	Akita	24	7	21.7	.378	.258	.703	6.2	2.6	**1.6**	0.5	10.3
2017–18	Ibaraki	30	3	18.4	.406	.280	.526	7.3	1.9	0.4	0.6	8.0
2018–19	Holargos	29	27	27.4	.368	.317	.533	5.10	1.17	0.90	0.24	8.24
2019–20	Le Portel	8	3	13.2	.370	.412	.000	2.25	1.25	0.38	0.12	3.38

=== Playoffs ===
Year	Team	GP	GS	MPG	FG%	3P%	FT%	RPG	APG	SPG	BPG	PPG
2016–17	Rethymno	5		29.0	.315	.273	.545	7.2	1.4	1.2	0.8	9.8
2018–19	Holargos	3		31.7	.424	.400	.500	13.3	0.3	1.0	0.0	12.0

=== Early cup games ===
Year	Team	GP	GS	MPG	FG%	3P%	FT%	RPG	APG	SPG	BPG	PPG
2017	Akita	2	0	21:22	.471	.333	.000	4.0	4.0	1.5	0.0	9.0
