= Gary Talton =

American basketball player (born 1990)

Personal information
- Born: March 29, 1990 (age 36) Dallas, Texas, U.S.
- Listed height: 6 ft 1 in (1.85 m)
- Listed weight: 170 lb (77 kg)

Career information
- High school: DeSoto (Dallas, Texas)
- College: Navarro (2009–2010); Mountain View (2010–2011); UIC (2011–2013)
- NBA draft: 2013: undrafted
- Playing career: 2013–2024
- Position: Point guard

Career history
- 2013–2014: Rio Grande Valley Vipers
- 2014–2015: Fort Wayne Mad Ants
- 2015: Rio Grande Valley Vipers
- 2015–2016: Delaware 87ers
- 2016: Grand Rapids Drive
- 2016–2017: Rethymno Cretan Kings
- 2017–2018: Lietkabelis Panevėžys
- 2018: Aries Trikala
- 2018: Sioux Falls Skyforce
- 2018–2019: Holargos
- 2019: Aris Thessaloniki
- 2020: Plymouth Raiders
- 2020–2021: BCM U Pitești
- 2021–2022: BC Timișoara
- 2023: BK Ogre
- 2023–2024: Anorthosis

Career highlights
- Second-team All-Horizon League (2013); Horizon League All-Freshman Team (2012)

William Gary Talton II (born March 29, 1990) is an American former basketball player. He played college basketball at Navarro College, Mountain View College and UIC.

== High school career ==
Talton played high school basketball at DeSoto, leading the Eagles to a 28–9 record and final national ranking of No. 137 during the 2007–08 campaign earning First-Team Division III All-American and First-Team All-Tournament honors during the Mountain View national title run.

== College career ==
Talton began his college career at Navarro College, transferring the next year to Mountain View CC leading the Lions to the National Junior College Athletic Association (NJCAA) Division III National Championship.

The next year, Talton transferred to UIC, averaging 12.3 points and 4.4 assists as a senior while being named to the All-Horizon League Second Team after guiding the Flames to an 18–16 record.

== Professional career ==
After going undrafted in the 2013 NBA draft, Talton entered the 2013 NBA Development League Draft, being chosen by the Rio Grande Valley Vipers in the 4th round with the 16th pick.

In 2014, Talton was traded to the Fort Wayne Mad Ants, however he was waived later by the Mad Ants. Later, he returned to the Vipers, averaging 14.4 points, 5.8 rebounds, 13.5 assists and 1.4 steals per game in 12 matches.

On October 21, 2015, Talton was traded to the Delaware 87ers and after 23 games, he joined the Grand Rapids Drive adding 30 more appearances. Overall, in 53 games, he had 8.3 points, 2.8 rebounds and 4.3 assists in 25.7 minutes.

On July 4, 2016, Talton signed with Rethymno Cretan Kings of the Greek Basket League.

On September 5, 2017, he signed with Lietkabelis Panevėžys. On February 25, 2018, he returned to the Greek Basket League and joined Aries Trikala.

== Personal life ==
The son of William Talton and Sonya Smith, he has three siblings. He majored in History.
