= Deduction board game =

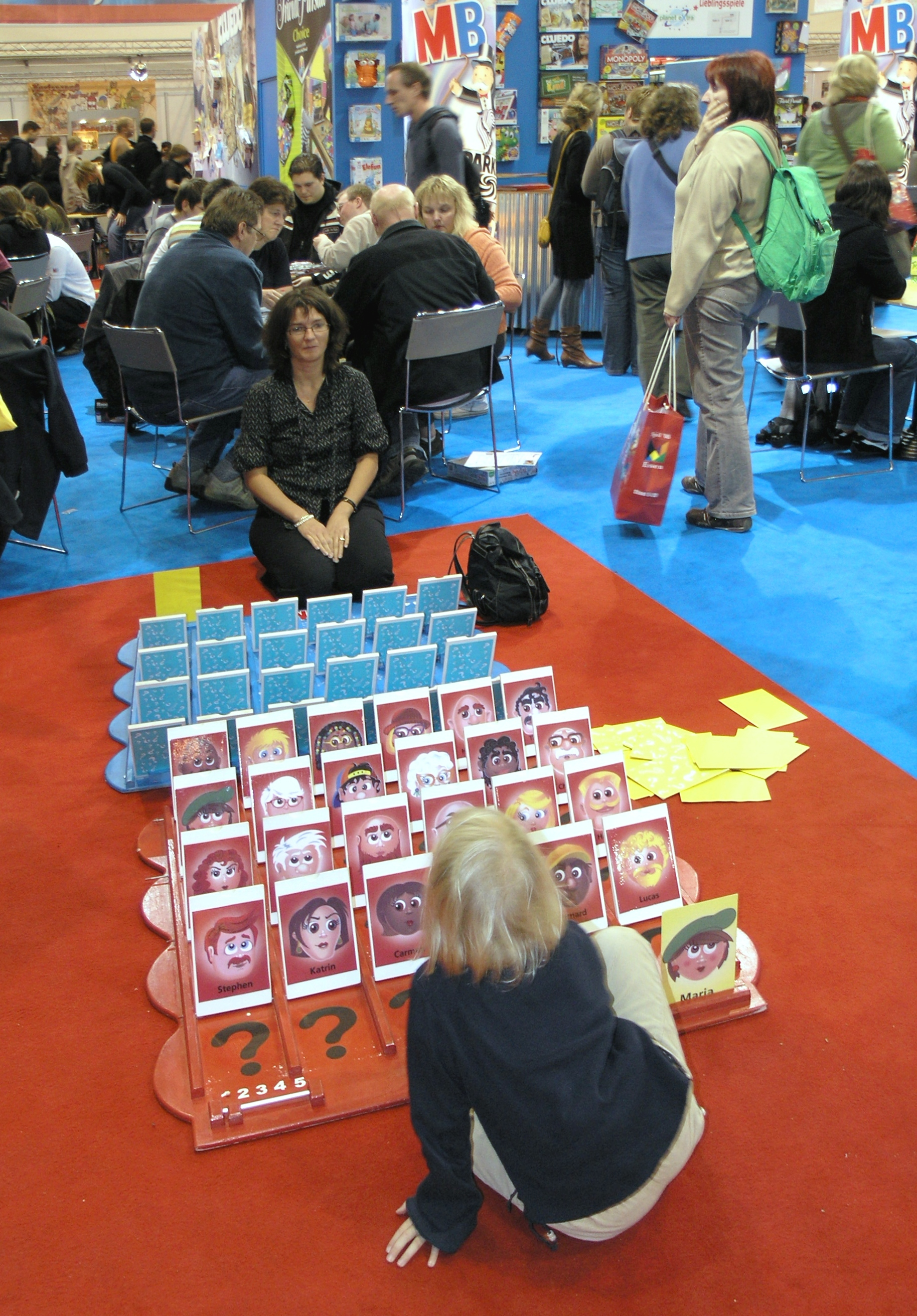

Deduction board games are a genre of board game in which the players must use deductive reasoning and logic in order to win the game. While many games, such as bridge or poker require the use of deductive reasoning to some degree, deduction board games feature deductive reasoning as their central mechanic.

Deduction board games typically fall into two broad categories; abstract and investigation games.

== Abstract ==
Abstract deduction games have no theme and focus on pure abstract reasoning. Though abstract, some introduce random elements. For example, in the game Code 777, the question cards used to gather information are drawn at random. Notable members of this category include Black Box and Master Mind.

== Investigation games ==
Investigation games are board games in which the players generally play as police, detectives or other investigators.

The best known game of this type is Cluedo. In fact, many of games in this category utilize a mechanic known as "The Missing Card," which was developed by Anthony E. Pratt for Cluedo (Clue in the United States). "The Missing Card" takes a known set of cards (or other token) and removes one or more of them. By gathering information and using deduction and logic, the players can determine which cards were removed to win the game.

Other mechanics used in investigation games include the "one against all" mechanic, as seen in Scotland Yard, The Fury of Dracula and similar games. In these games, one player attempts to stay hidden as the others attempt to discover his location.

There are some games, such as Lie Detector, published by Mattel in 1960, that use unique mechanics. This game used punch cards and plastic lie-detector machine that players could use to determine if statements were true or false. While popular, this game did not produce imitators akin to those from Cluedo or Scotland Yard.

== See also ==
- Murder mystery game
- Abstract strategy game
- Social deduction game
