= 2017–18 Aris Thessaloniki B.C. season =

Aris Thessaloniki
2017–18 season
- Head coach: Panagiotis Giannakis (until 21 March 2018); Vangelis Angelou (from 22 March 2018)
- Basket League: 9th
- Greek Cup: Semifinals
- BCL: Regular Season
Home	Away

The 2017–18 Aris Thessaloniki B.C. season was the 64th appearance in the top-tier level Greek Basket League for Aris Thessaloniki. The club finished 9th in Regular season. In Greek Basketball Cup Aris Thessaloniki were eliminated by Olympiacos. The team also competed in Basketball Champions League where finished 8th in Group D of Regular season.

During the season the club changed its manager and hired Vangelis Angelou

== First-team squad ==
#	Name	Nationality	Position(s)	Height	Date of birth (age)
3	Ivan Maraš	(Montenegro)	PF / C	2.08 m	April 20, 1986 (aged 32)
4	Lefteris Bochoridis	(Greece)	PG / SG	1.96 m	April 18, 1994 (aged 24)
5	Panagiotis Kalaitzakis	(Greece)	SG / SF	2.00 m	January 2, 1999 (aged 19)
7	Dimitris Flionis	(Greece)	PG / SG	1.90 m	April 8, 1997 (aged 21)
9	Michalis Tsairelis	(Greece)	PF / C	2.08 m	February 23, 1988 (aged 30)
11	Stelios Poulianitis	(Greece)	PG	1.90 m	April 3, 1995 (aged 23)
14	Vassilis Christidis	(Greece)	PF / C	2.08 m	July 10, 1998 (aged 19)
16	Spyros Mourtos	(Greece)	SF / SG	1.98 m	December 5, 1990 (aged 27)
17	Ioannis Athinaiou	(Greece)	PG / SG	1.94 m	May 27, 1988 (aged 30)
18	Omar Prewitt	(United States)	SG / SF	2.01 m	September 24, 1994 (aged 23)
21	Bryce Douvier	(Austria)	PF / SF	2.01 m	December 1, 1991 (aged 26)
44	Gary Bell	(United States)	SG	1.90 m	October 12, 1992 (aged 25)

=== Roster changes ===
==== In ====
Position(s)	#	Name	Moving from
SG / PG	4	(Greece) Lefteris Bochoridis	(Greece) Panathinaikos Superfoods
SF	18	(United States) Omar Prewitt	(Lithuania) BC Šiauliai
PF / C	3	(Montenegro) Ivan Maraš	(France) Cholet Basket
PF / SF	31	(Austria) Bryce Douvier	(Italy) Blu Basket 1971

==== Out ====
Position(s)	#	Name	Moving to
PG / SG	12	(Greece) Nikos Diplaros	(Greece) Panionios
PG / SG	8	(United States) Kwame Vaughn	(Serbia) KK Partizan
PF	23	(United States) Brent Petway	(Czech Republic) Tuři Svitavy
PF / C	20	(United States) Demetris Morant	Free Agent
C / PF	34	(United States) Keith Benson	(Japan) Osaka Evessa
SG / SF	25	(United States) Kyle Weaver	Free Agent
SF / PF	21	(Greece) Panagiotis Vasilopoulos	(Greece) AEK Athens

== Competitions ==
=== Overall ===
Competition	Started round	Current position / round	Final position / round	First match	Last match
Greek Basket League	Matchday 1	—	9th	7 October 2017	13 May 2018
Greek Basketball Cup	Quarterfinals	—	Semifinals	4 October 2017	5 November 2017
Basketball Champions League	Regular season	—	8th in Group D	11 October 2017	7 February 2018

Updated to match played 13 May 2018
Source: Competitions

=== Overview ===
Competition	Record							
Competition	Pld	W	D	L	PF	PA	PD	Win %
Greek Basket League	26	10	0	16	1,754	1,869	−115	38.46
Greek Basketball Cup	2	1	0	1	119	119	+0	50.00
Basketball Champions League	14	4	0	10	930	1,039	−109	28.57
Total	42	15	0	27	2,803	3,027	−224	35.71

Last updated: 13 May 2018
Source: Competitions

==== Manager's Overview ====
===== Panagiotis Giannakis =====
Competition	Record							
Competition	Pld	W	D	L	PF	PA	PD	Win %
Greek Basket League	18	6	0	12	1,207	1,330	−123	33.33
Greek Basketball Cup	2	1	0	1	119	119	+0	50.00
Basketball Champions League	14	4	0	10	930	1,039	−109	28.57
Total	34	11	0	23	2,256	2,488	−232	32.35

Source: Competitions

===== Vangelis Angelou =====
Competition	Record							
Competition	Pld	W	D	L	PF	PA	PD	Win %
Greek Basket League	8	4	0	4	547	539	+8	50.00
Greek Basketball Cup	0	0	0	0	0	0	+0	—
Basketball Champions League	0	0	0	0	0	0	+0	—
Total	8	4	0	4	547	539	+8	50.00

Source: Competitions

=== Greek Basket League ===
==== Regular season ====
===== Standings =====
Pos	Team	Pld	W	L	PF	PA	PD	Pts	Qualification or relegation
7	Kymis	26	14	12	2026	2032	−6	40	Advanced to playoffs
8	Kolossos H Hotels	26	11	15	1934	1977	−43	37	Advanced to playoffs
9	Aris	26	10	16	1754	1869	−115	36	
10	Rethymno Cretan Kings	26	10	16	2047	2136	−89	36	
11	Gymnastikos Larissas Faros	26	8	18	1927	2190	−263	34	

Source: ESAKE

===== Results overview =====
Opposition	Home score	Away score	Double
AEK Athens	64-62	64-73	128-135
GS Larissas Faros	71-60	76-81	147-141
Kolossos H Hotels	72-86	67-73	139-159
Koroivos	66-68	55-71	121-139
Kymis Seajets	60-73	69-94	129-167
Lavrio DHI	80-69	71-70	151-139
Olympiacos	55-80	66-86	121-166
Panathinaikos Superfoods	70-88	63-84	133-172
Panionios	60-48	87-81	147-129
PAOK	65-66	57-63	122-129
Promitheas Patras	68-64	40-70	108-134
Rethymno Cretan Kings	70-52	73-80	143-132
Trikala Aries	82-63	83-64	165-127

===== Matches =====
7 October 2017 1	Koroivos	71–55	Aris Thessaloniki	Amaliada
17:00	Scoring by quarter: 20-7, 17-24, 26-11, 8-13
	Pts: Quenton DeCosey 17; Rebs: Quenton DeCosey 8 Asts: Giannis Sachpatzidis 4		Pts: Keith Benson 16; Rebs: Keith Benson 7 Asts: Dimitris Flionis 4	Arena: Amaliada Indoor Hall

14 October 2017 2	Aris Thessaloniki	64–62	AEK Athens	Thessaloniki
17:00	Scoring by quarter: 10-15, 17-19, 21-13, 16-15
	Pts: Keith Benson 12; Rebs: Keith Benson 9 Asts: Ioannis Athinaiou 5		Pts: Mike Green 17; Rebs: Delroy James 7 Asts: Vassilis Xanthopoulos 5	Arena: Nick Galis Hall

21 October 2017 3	Lavrio Megabolt	70–71	Aris Thessaloniki	Lavrio
18:30	Scoring by quarter: 24-19, 16-14, 15-16, 15-25
	Pts: Dimitris Kaklamanakis 13; Rebs: Dimitris Kaklamanakis 8 Asts: Steven Gray 4		Pts: Kwame Vaughn 16; Rebs: Keith Benson 8 Asts: Kwame Vaughn, Ioannis Athinaiou 3	Arena: Lavrio Indoor Hall

29 October 2017 4	Aris Thessaloniki	55–80	Olympiacos	Thessaloniki
17:00	Scoring by quarter: 14-22, 10-23, 21-17, 10-18
	Pts: Michalis Tsairelis 11; Rebs: Keith Benson 5 Asts: Panagiotis Vasilopoulos 4		Pts: Dimitrios Agravanis 12; Rebs: Dimitrios Agravanis 8 Asts: Kostas Papanikolaou 5	Arena: Nick Galis Hall

11 November 2017 5	PAOK	63–57	Aris Thessaloniki	Thessaloniki
18:30	Scoring by quarter: 18-18, 13-13, 23-8, 9-18
	Pts: Lucky Jones 20; Rebs: Owen Klassen 9 Asts: Antonis Koniaris 8		Pts: Ioannis Athinaiou 20; Rebs: Kyle Weaver 8 Asts: Stelios Poulianitis 3	Arena: P.A.O.K. Sports Arena

18 November 2017 6	Aris Thessaloniki	71–60	GS Larissas Faros	Thessaloniki
18:30	Scoring by quarter: 10-18, 23-9, 17-12, 21-21
	Pts: Panagiotis Vasilopoulos 11; Rebs: Panagiotis Vasilopoulos, Gary Bell Jr. 7 Asts: Panagiotis Vasilopoulos 4		Pts: Vassilis Mouratos 15; Rebs: Roeland Schaftenaar 9 Asts: Nondas Papantoniou 4	Arena: Nick Galis Hall

2 December 2017 7	Promitheas Patras	70–40	Aris Thessaloniki	Patras
16:30	Scoring by quarter: 12-19, 20-10, 24-6, 14-5
	Pts: Sean Evans 12; Rebs: Milan Milošević 8 Asts: Trevor Releford 5		Pts: Keith Benson 16; Rebs: Keith Benson 10; Asts: (3 players) 2	Arena: Dimitris Tofalos Arena

10 December 2017 8	Aris Thessaloniki	70–88	Panathinaikos Superfoods	Thessaloniki
17:00	Scoring by quarter: 17-21, 15-27, 17-16, 21-24
	Pts: Keith Benson 18; Rebs: Keith Benson 9 Asts: Ioannis Athinaiou 4		Pts: Nick Calathes 18; Rebs: James Gist, Zach Auguste 6 Asts: Nick Calathes 8	Arena: Nick Galis Hall

16 December 2017 9	Kymis Seajets	94–69	Aris Thessaloniki	Kymi
18:30	Scoring by quarter: 14-21, 25-14, 31-16, 24-18
	Pts: Thad McFadden 29; Rebs: Michale Kyser 7 Asts: Teddy Okereafor 3		Pts: Ioannis Athinaiou 19; Rebs: Panagiotis Vasilopoulos 9 Asts: (3 players) 3	Arena: Tasos Kabouris Kanithou Indoor Hall

30 December 2017 10	Aris Thessaloniki	82–63	Trikala Aries	Thessaloniki
18:30	Scoring by quarter: 24-13, 20-21, 22-11, 16-18
	Pts: Michalis Tsairelis 15; Rebs: Panagiotis Vasilopoulos 8 Asts: Omar Prewitt 5		Pts: ShawnDre' Jones 15; Rebs: Marko Tejić 9 Asts: ShawnDre' Jones, Halil Kanacević 3	Arena: Nick Galis Hall

6 January 2018 11	Panionios	81–87	Aris Thessaloniki	Nea Smyrni, Athens
16:30	Scoring by quarter: 21-17, 21-30, 25-19, 14-21
	Pts: Chris McNealy 18; Rebs: Boris Dallo, Esian Henderson 6 Asts: Vangelis Sakellariou 6		Pts: Lefteris Bochoridis 27; Rebs: Panagiotis Vasilopoulos 10; Asts: Lefteris Bochoridis, Gary Bell Jr. 3	Arena: Nea Smyrni Indoor Hall

14 January 2018 12	Rethymno Cretan Kings	80–73	Aris Thessaloniki	Rethymno
15:30	Scoring by quarter: 17-18, 23-17, 13-20, 27-18
	Pts: Shaquille Goodwin 19; Rebs: Shaquille Goodwin 8 Asts: Malcolm Armstead 6		Pts: Lefteris Bochoridis 21; Rebs: Lefteris Bochoridis 8 Asts: Lefteris Bochoridis 7	Arena: Melina Merkouri Indoor Hall

20 January 2018 13	Aris Thessaloniki	72–86	Kolossos H Hotels	Thessaloniki
16:30	Scoring by quarter: 21-27, 13-21, 19-20, 19-18
	Pts: Ivan Maraš 18; Rebs: Ivan Maraš, Gary Bell Jr. 4 Asts: Lefteris Bochoridis 6		Pts: T.J. Bray 16; Rebs: Ramon Harris, Marvin Jones 9 Asts: T.J. Bray 6	Arena: Nick Galis Hall

28 January 2018 14	Aris Thessaloniki	66–68	Koroivos	Thessaloniki
17:00	Scoring by quarter: 23-18, 16-19, 17-8, 10-23
	Pts: Lefteris Bochoridis 15; Rebs: Bryce Douvier 10; Asts: Spyros Mourtos 5		Pts: Quenton DeCosey 16; Rebs: Quenton DeCosey 6 Asts: Jahii Carson, Alexis Spyridonidis 3	Arena: Nick Galis Hall

3 February 2018 15	AEK Athens	73–64	Aris Thessaloniki	Athens
17:00	Scoring by quarter: 13-18, 26-11, 14-20, 20-15
	Pts: Vassilis Kavvadas 12; Rebs: Panagiotis Vasilopoulos 10; Asts: Giannoulis Larentzakis 6		Pts: Michalis Tsairelis 18; Rebs: Lefteris Bochoridis, Michalis Tsairelis 6 Asts: Stelios Poulianitis 6	Arena: Nikos Galis Olympic Indoor Hall

14 February 2018 16	Aris Thessaloniki	80–69	Lavrio Megabolt	Thessaloniki
18:00	Scoring by quarter: 25-15, 22-19, 7-15, 26-20
	Pts: Michalis Tsairelis 18; Rebs: Ivan Maraš 9 Asts: Ioannis Athinaiou 12		Pts: Doron Lamb 16; Rebs: D. J. Johnson 8 Asts: Doron Lamb, McKenzie Moore 4	Arena: Nick Galis Hall

5 March 2018 17	Olympiacos	86–66	Aris Thessaloniki	Piraeus
18:00	Scoring by quarter: 21-14, 19-12, 23-20, 23-20
	Pts: Ioannis Papapetrou, Vangelis Mantzaris 15; Rebs: Nikola Milutinov 8 Asts: Vangelis Mantzaris 5		Pts: Lefteris Bochoridis 13; Rebs: Ivan Maraš 7 Asts: (3 players) 2	Arena: Peace and Friendship Stadium

21 March 2018 (Note: The programmed date of the game was 11 March 2018 but its postponed and reprogrammed) 18	Aris Thessaloniki	65–66	PAOK	Thessaloniki
18:30	Scoring by quarter: 13-21, 23-16, 16-13, 13-16
	Pts: Ioannis Athinaiou 18; Rebs: Ivan Maraš 10; Asts: Ioannis Athinaiou 3		Pts: Vassilis Charalampopoulos 16; Rebs: Ousman Krubally, Lucky Jones 5 Asts: Antonis Koniaris, Vassilis Charalampopoulos 3	Arena: Nick Galis Hall

17 March 2018 19	G.S. Larissas Faros	81–76	Aris Thessaloniki	Larissa
16:30	Scoring by quarter: 30-17, 15-17, 19-19, 17-23
	Pts: Steve Burtt Jr. 28; Rebs: Paris Maragkos 5 Asts: Roeland Schaftenaar 3		Pts: Gary Bell Jr. 16; Rebs: Ivan Maraš 11; Asts: (3 players) 3	Arena: Larissa Neapolis Indoor Arena

24 March 2018 20	Aris Thessaloniki	68–64	Promitheas Patras	Thessaloniki
18:30	Scoring by quarter: 22-19, 13-21, 18-11, 15-13
	Pts: Ioannis Athinaiou 16; Rebs: (3 players) 6 Asts: Ioannis Athinaiou 6		Pts: Stavros Toutziarakis, Nikos Gikas 15; Rebs: Christos Saloustros 8 Asts: Nikos Gikas 6	Arena: Nick Galis Hall

2 April 2018 21	Panathinaikos Superfoods	84–63	Aris Thessaloniki	Athens
18:00	Scoring by quarter: 27-18, 14-12, 28-12, 15-21
	Pts: Marcus Denmon 18; Rebs: Marcus Denmon 6 Asts: Lukas Lekavičius, Nick Calathes 6		Pts: Michalis Tsairelis 14; Rebs: Ioannis Athinaiou, Omar Prewitt 7 Asts: Lefteris Bochoridis 4	Arena: Nikos Galis Olympic Indoor Hall

11 April 2018 22	Aris Thessaloniki	60–73	Kymis Seajets	Thessaloniki
18:00	Scoring by quarter: 13-19, 15-22, 16-18, 16-14
	Pts: Michalis Tsairelis 14; Rebs: Omar Prewitt, Bryce Douvier 4 Asts: (4 players) 2		Pts: Thad McFadden 14; Rebs: Gary McGhee, Michale Kyser 9 Asts: Thad McFadden 4	Arena: Nick Galis Hall

14 April 2018 23	Trikala Aries	64–83	Aris Thessaloniki	Trikala
16:30	Scoring by quarter: 19-33, 12-12, 13-17, 20-21
	Pts: D. J. Richardson, Michalis Lountzis 17; Rebs: Michalis Lountzis 8 Asts: (3 players) 2		Pts: Ivan Maraš 18; Rebs: Bryce Douvier 15; Asts: (3 players) 4	Arena: Trikala Municipal Sports Hall

5 May 2018 24	Aris Thessaloniki	60–48	Panionios	Thessaloniki
17:00	Scoring by quarter: 19-16, 13-9, 17-9, 11-14
	Pts: Dimitris Flionis 12; Rebs: Lefteris Bochoridis 12; Asts: Ioannis Athinaiou 4		Pts: Markeith Cummings 14; Rebs: Boris Dallo 11; Asts: Tyrone Brazelton 5	Arena: Nick Galis Hall

9 May 2018 25	Aris Thessaloniki	70–52	Rethymno Cretan Kings	Thessaloniki
18:00	Scoring by quarter: 11-19, 23-11, 19-11, 17-11
	Pts: Lefteris Bochoridis 12; Rebs: Ivan Maraš 7 Asts: Lefteris Bochoridis 5		Pts: Shaquille Goodwin 12; Rebs: Shaquille Goodwin 11; Asts: Anthony Hickey 3	Arena: Nick Galis Hall

13 May 2018 26	Kolossos H Hotels	73–67	Aris Thessaloniki	Rhodes
17:00	Scoring by quarter: 20-11, 15-11, 14-18, 24-27
	Pts: T.J. Bray 18; Rebs: Ramon Harris 13; Asts: Dustin Ware 5		Pts: Ivan Maraš 15; Rebs: Lefteris Bochoridis 10; Asts: Lefteris Bochoridis 6	Arena: Venetokleio Indoor Hall

=== Greek Cup ===
==== Quarterfinal ====
4 October 2017 Quarterfinals	Aris Thessaloniki	70–63	PAOK B.C.	Thessaloniki
19:00	Scoring by quarter: 17-16, 25-13, 16-15, 12-19
	Pts: Keith Benson, Panagiotis Vasilopoulos 12; Rebs: Panagiotis Vasilopoulos 10; Asts: Kwame Vaughn 5		Pts: Kevin Dillard, Lucky Jones 14; Rebs: Ousman Krubally 10; Asts: Kevin Dillard 7	Arena: Nick Galis Hall

==== Semifinal ====
5 November 2017 Semifinals	Aris Thessaloniki	49–56	Olympiacos B.C.	Thessaloniki
18:30	Scoring by quarter: 8-14, 14-14, 10-9, 17-19
	Pts: Kwame Vaughn 15; Rebs: Michalis Tsairelis, Panagiotis Vasilopoulos 5 Asts: Ioannis Athinaiou 3		Pts: Nikola Milutinov, Jānis Strēlnieks 11; Rebs: Nikola Milutinov 11; Asts: Vangelis Mantzaris, Brian Roberts 3	Arena: Nick Galis Hall

=== Basketball Champions League ===
==== Regular season ====
===== League table =====
Pos	Team	Pld	W	L	PF	PA	PD	Pts	Qualification
1	(Turkey) Beşiktaş Sompo Japan	14	10	4	1111	1030	+81	24	Advance to round of 16
2	(Czech Republic) ČEZ Nymburk	14	10	4	1152	1100	+52	24	Advance to round of 16
3	(France) Nanterre 92	14	9	5	1149	1091	+58	23	Advance to round of 16
4	(Poland) Stelmet Zielona Góra	14	6	8	1075	1087	−12	20	Advance to round of 16
5	(Italy) Sidigas Avellino	14	6	8	1049	1028	+21	20	Transfer to FIBA Europe Cup
6	(Belgium) Oostende	14	6	8	975	1050	−75	20	Transfer to FIBA Europe Cup
7	(Germany) Telekom Baskets Bonn	14	5	9	1079	1095	−16	19	
8	(Greece) Aris Thessaloniki	14	4	10	930	1039	−109	18	

Updated to match(es) played on 7 February 2018. Source: Basketball Champions League

===== Results overview =====
Opposition	Home score	Away score	Double
(Italy) Sidigas Avellino	59-56	66-79	125-135
(Turkey) Beşiktaş Sompo Japan	65-72	61-83	126-155
(Germany) Telekom Baskets Bonn	69-75	59-76	128-151
(France) Nanterre 92	70-62	63-91	133-153
(Czech Republic) ČEZ Nymburk	65-71	70-99	135-170
(Belgium) Oostende	66-70	67-69	133-139
(Poland) Stelmet Zielona Góra	70-64	80-72	150-136

===== Matches =====
11 October 2017 1	Aris Thessaloniki (Greece)	70–64	(Poland) Stelmet Zielona Góra	Thessaloniki
19:30	Scoring by quarter: 24–10, 13-13, 21-21, 12-20
	Pts: Kyle Weaver 16; Rebs: Brent Petway 8 Asts: Ioannis Athinaiou 6		Pts: Thomas Kelati 15; Rebs: Vladimir Dragićević 6 Asts: Łukasz Koszarek 7	Arena: Nick Galis Hall

17 October 2017 2	ČEZ Nymburk (Czech Republic)	99–70	(Greece) Aris Thessaloniki	Nymburk
18:30	Scoring by quarter: 27–18, 19-23, 25–13, 28–16
	Pts: Quincy Diggs 19; Rebs: Martin Kríz 6 Asts: Eugene Lawrence 9		Pts: Gary Bell Jr. 15; Rebs: Kwame Vaughn 6 Asts: Panagiotis Vasilopoulos 4	Arena: CEZ Sportovni Hala Nymburk

25 October 2017 3	Aris Thessaloniki (Greece)	70–62	(France) Nanterre 92	Thessaloniki
19:30	Scoring by quarter: 16-17, 30-19, 8-17, 16-9
	Pts: Michalis Tsairelis 16; Rebs: Michalis Tsairelis, Panagiotis Vasilopoulos 6 Asts: (3 players) 2		Pts: Jamal Shuler 15; Rebs: Hugo Invernizzi 8 Asts: Lahaou Konaté, Heiko Schaffartzik 3	Arena: Nick Galis Hall

31 October 2017 4	Aris Thessaloniki (Greece)	69–75	(Germany) Telekom Baskets Bonn	Thessaloniki
19:30	Scoring by quarter: 18-16, 21-13, 14-24, 16-22
	Pts: Kwame Vaughn 16; Rebs: Michalis Tsairelis 5 Asts: Dimitris Flionis 4		Pts: Julian Gamble 20; Rebs: Julian Gamble 8 Asts: Josh Mayo 4	Arena: Nick Galis Hall

7 November 2017 5	Beşiktaş Sompo Japan Istanbul (Turkey)	83–61	(Greece) Aris Thessaloniki	Istanbul
20:00	Scoring by quarter: 15–22, 25-11, 20–14, 23–14
	Pts: Ryan Boatright 21; Rebs: D. J. Strawberry 6 Asts: Ryan Boatright 7		Pts: Ioannis Athinaiou 18; Rebs: Keith Benson 8 Asts: Ioannis Athinaiou 6	Arena: Beşiktaş Akatlar Arena

14 November 2017 6	Aris Thessaloniki (Greece)	59–56	(Italy) Sidigas Avellino	Thessaloniki
19:30	Scoring by quarter: 12-12, 13-15, 14-17, 20-12
	Pts: Gary Bell Jr. 16; Rebs: Brent Petway, Panagiotis Vasilopoulos 8 Asts: Ioannis Athinaiou 5		Pts: Jason Rich, Hamady N'Diaye 16; Rebs: Hamady N'Diaye 7 Asts: (3 players) 4	Arena: Nick Galis Hall

5 December 2017 7	Oostende (Belgium)	69–67	(Greece) Aris Thessaloniki	Ostend
20:30	Scoring by quarter: 19–20, 19-12, 15–21, 16–14
	Pts: Dušan Đorđević 17; Rebs: Mike Myers 9 Asts: Jean Salumu 4		Pts: Michalis Tsairelis 20; Rebs: Ioannis Athinaiou, Panagiotis Vasilopoulos 6 Asts: Ioannis Athinaiou 6	Arena: Sea'Arena

12 December 2017 8	Stelmet Zielona Góra (Poland)	72–80	(Greece) Aris Thessaloniki	Zielona Góra
20:30	Scoring by quarter: 12–15, 20-23, 19–18, 21–24
	Pts: Vladimir Dragićević 16; Rebs: Vladimir Dragićević 7 Asts: Łukasz Koszarek 5		Pts: Lefteris Bochoridis 22; Rebs: Keith Benson 7 Asts: Lefteris Bochoridis 9	Arena: CRS Hall Zielona Góra

19 December 2017 9	Aris Thessaloniki (Greece)	65–71	(Czech Republic) ČEZ Nymburk	Thessaloniki
19:30	Scoring by quarter: 11–17, 12–25, 22–9, 20–20
	Pts: Michalis Tsairelis 23; Rebs: Panagiotis Vasilopoulos 11; Asts: Ioannis Athinaiou 5		Pts: Kendrick Ray 22; Rebs: Kendrick Ray 6 Asts: Pavel Pumprla 4	Arena: Nick Galis Hall

9 January 2018 10	Nanterre 92 (France)	91–63	(Greece) Aris Thessaloniki	Nanterre
20:30	Scoring by quarter: 27-14, 21-16, 20-16, 23-17
	Pts: Alade Aminu 18; Rebs: Jamal Shuler 6 Asts: Jamal Shuler 6		Pts: Lefteris Bochoridis, Gary Bell Jr. 15; Rebs: Panagiotis Vasilopoulos, Gary Bell Jr. 7 Asts: Lefteris Bochoridis 3	Arena: Palais des Sports

17 January 2018 11	Telekom Baskets Bonn (Germany)	76–59	(Greece) Aris Thessaloniki	Bonn
20:00	Scoring by quarter: 26-19, 23-14, 13-13, 14-13
	Pts: Tomislav Zubčić 15; Rebs: Ron Curry, Julian Gamble 5 Asts: Josh Mayo 5		Pts: Lefteris Bochoridis, Michalis Tsairelis 10; Rebs: Bryce Douvier 8 Asts: Lefteris Bochoridis, Panagiotis Vasilopoulos 2	Arena: Telekom Dome

24 January 2018 12	Aris Thessaloniki (Greece)	65–72(OT)	(Turkey) Beşiktaş Sompo Japan Istanbul	Thessaloniki
19:30	Scoring by quarter: 20-17, 9-11, 13-18, 17-13, Overtime: 6-13
	Pts: Gary Bell Jr. 18; Rebs: Bryce Douvier 11; Asts: Lefteris Bochoridis 3		Pts: D. J. Strawberry 15; Rebs: Earl Clark 8 Asts: D. J. Strawberry 4	Arena: Nick Galis Hall

31 January 2018 13	Sidigas Avellino (Italy)	79–66	(Greece) Aris Thessaloniki	Avellino
21:30	Scoring by quarter: 21-25, 22-8, 20-17, 16-16
	Pts: Jason Rich 13; Rebs: Hamady N'Diaye 11; Asts: Jason Rich 5		Pts: Ivan Maraš 19; Rebs: Bryce Douvier 7 Asts: Lefteris Bochoridis 5	Arena: Palasport Del Mauro

7 February 2018 14	Aris Thessaloniki (Greece)	66–70	(Belgium) Oostende	Thessaloniki
19:30	Scoring by quarter: 22-7, 15-20, 12-19, 17-24
	Pts: Ivan Maraš 20; Rebs: Ivan Maraš, Ioannis Athinaiou 6 Asts: Spyros Mourtos 3		Pts: Jean Salumu 15; Rebs: Tonye Jekiri 10; Asts: Jean Salumu 4	Arena: Nick Galis Hall

== Players' statistics ==
=== Total Statistics ===
#	Player	GP	PTS	PPG	TR	RPG	DR	OR	AST	APG	STL	SPG	BLK	BPG
3	(Montenegro) Ivan Maraš	21	207	9.86	117	5.57	76	41	22	1.05	23	1.10	7	0.33
4	(Greece) Lefteris Bochoridis	27	306	11.33	112	4.15	84	28	84	3.11	28	1.04	10	0.37
5	(Greece) Panagiotis Kalaitzakis	9	6	0.67	3	0.33	2	1	0	0.00	0	0.00	0	0.00
7	(Greece) Dimitris Flionis	42	181	4.31	84	2.00	64	20	50	1.19	35	0.83	1	0.02
9	(Greece) Michalis Tsairelis	38	341	8.97	120	3.16	70	50	39	1.03	18	0.47	8	0.21
11	(Greece) Stelios Poulianitis	34	81	2.38	44	1.29	30	14	29	0.85	10	0.29	2	0.06
14	(Greece) Vassilis Christidis	34	53	1.56	38	1.12	24	14	6	0.18	9	0.26	6	0.18
16	(Greece) Spyros Mourtos	42	132	3.14	123	2.93	78	45	37	0.88	30	0.71	10	0.24
17	(Greece) Ioannis Athinaiou	34	305	8.97	92	2.71	77	15	107	3.15	22	0.65	0	0.00
18	(United States) Omar Prewitt	20	120	6.00	54	2.70	45	9	22	1.10	9	0.45	0	0.00
31	(Austria) Bryce Douvier	17	88	5.18	79	4.65	55	24	8	0.47	5	0.29	0	0.00
44	(United States) Gary Bell Jr.	41	323	7.88	105	2.56	74	31	57	1.39	35	0.85	2	0.05
-	(United States) Kwame Vaughn	13	124	9.54	27	2.08	21	6	23	1.77	11	0.85	0	0.00
-	(United States) Brent Petway	13	45	3.46	42	3.23	26	16	5	0.38	9	0.69	6	0.46
-	(United States) Demetris Morant	9	18	2.00	18	2.00	10	8	0	0.00	0	0.00	0	0.00
-	(United States) Keith Benson	20	171	8.55	98	4.90	66	32	5	0.25	4	0.20	19	0.95
-	(United States) Kyle Weaver	21	94	4.48	72	3.43	62	10	32	1.52	16	0.76	3	0.14
-	(Greece) Panagiotis Vasilopoulos	25	208	8.32	144	5.76	116	28	53	2.12	23	0.92	22	0.88
	Team				78		48	30						
	Team totals	42	2803	66.74	1450	34.52	1028	422	579	13.79	287	6.83	96	2.29

==== Shooting ====
#	Player	GP	FTA	FTM	FT%	2PM	2PA	2P%	3PM	3PA	3P%
3	(Montenegro) Ivan Maraš	21	35	60	58.33	74	137	54.01	8	37	21.62
4	(Greece) Lefteris Bochoridis	27	61	96	63.54	67	139	48.20	37	114	32.46
5	(Greece) Panagiotis Kalaitzakis	9	0	0	0.00	3	7	42.86	0	0	0.00
7	(Greece) Dimitris Flionis	42	33	43	76.64	35	78	44.87	26	87	29.89
9	(Greece) Michalis Tsairelis	38	73	108	67.59	110	206	53.40	16	57	28.07
11	(Greece) Stelios Poulianitis	34	14	18	77.78	17	34	50.00	11	29	37.93
14	(Greece) Vassilis Christidis	34	13	23	56.52	20	46	43.88	0	4	0.00
16	(Greece) Spyros Mourtos	42	22	34	64.71	52	106	49.06	2	19	10.53
17	(Greece) Ioannis Athinaiou	34	72	93	77.42	40	105	38.10	51	172	29.65
18	(United States) Omar Prewitt	20	28	38	73.68	16	56	28.57	20	58	34.48
31	(Austria) Bryce Douvier	17	13	13	100.00	27	59	45.76	7	36	19.44
44	(United States) Gary Bell Jr.	41	45	62	72.58	64	155	41.29	50	161	31.06
-	(United States) Kwame Vaughn	13	34	39	87.18	27	63	42.86	12	44	27.27
-	(United States) Brent Petway	13	3	10	30.00	9	24	37.50	8	26	30.77
-	(United States) Demetris Morant	9	4	6	66.67	7	14	50.00	0	0	0.00
-	(United States) Keith Benson	20	33	52	63.46	66	136	48.53	2	5	40.00
-	(United States) Kyle Weaver	21	24	32	75.00	23	56	41.07	8	29	27.59
-	(Greece) Panagiotis Vasilopoulos	25	25	37	67.57	54	124	43.55	25	61	40.98
	Team totals	42	532	764	69.63	711	1545	46.02	283	939	30.14

Last updated: 13 May 2018
Source: Sum of the Below Tables

=== Basket League ===
#	Player	GP	PTS	PPG	TR	RPG	DR	OR	AST	APG	STL	SPG	BLK	BPG
3	(Montenegro) Ivan Maraš	16	144	9.00	92	5.75	59	33	19	1.19	17	1.06	7	0.44
4	(Greece) Lefteris Bochoridis	19	211	11.63	90	4.47	68	22	59	3.11	19	1.00	6	0.32
5	(Greece) Panagiotis Kalaitzakis	4	4	1.00	1	0.25	1	0	0	0.00	0	0.00	0	0.00
7	(Greece) Dimitris Flionis	26	129	4.96	58	2.23	42	16	31	1.19	19	0.73	1	0.04
9	(Greece) Michalis Tsairelis	25	234	9.36	66	2.64	42	24	26	1.04	10	0.40	7	0.28
11	(Greece) Stelios Poulianitis	22	68	3.09	36	1.64	24	12	25	1.14	8	0.36	2	0.09
14	(Greece) Vassilis Christidis	20	29	1.45	20	1.00	12	8	3	0.15	5	0.25	4	0.20
16	(Greece) Spyros Mourtos	26	93	3.58	83	3.19	54	29	31	1.19	25	0.96	7	0.27
17	(Greece) Ioannis Athinaiou	22	207	9.41	54	2.45	46	8	64	2.91	16	0.73	0	0.00
18	(United States) Omar Prewitt	15	82	5.47	44	2.93	38	6	14	0.93	6	0.40	0	0.00
31	(Austria) Bryce Douvier	14	66	4.71	52	3.71	34	18	6	0.43	5	0.36	0	0.00
44	(United States) Gary Bell Jr.	25	172	6.88	63	2.52	42	21	36	1.44	19	0.76	0	0.00
-	(United States) Kwame Vaughn	5	44	8.80	6	1.20	5	1	5	1.00	0	0.00	0	0.00
-	(United States) Brent Petway	6	18	3.00	16	2.67	8	8	4	0.67	2	0.33	2	0.33
-	(United States) Demetris Morant	6	16	2.67	14	2.33	8	6	0	0.00	0	0.00	0	0.00
-	(United States) Keith Benson	9	93	10.33	53	5.89	30	23	1	0.11	3	0.33	12	1.33
-	(United States) Kyle Weaver	10	40	4.00	38	3.80	33	5	16	1.60	7	0.70	1	0.10
-	(Greece) Panagiotis Vasilopoulos	12	94	7.83	70	5.83	56	14	22	1.83	14	1.17	9	0.75
	Team totals	26	1754	67.46	856	33.92	602	254	362	13.92	175	6.73	58	2.23

==== Shooting ====
#	Player	GP	FTA	FTM	FT%	2PM	2PA	2P%	3PM	3PA	3P%
3	(Montenegro) Ivan Maraš	16	22	41	53.66	58	98	59.18	2	24	8.33
4	(Greece) Lefteris Bochoridis	19	37	65	56.92	53	111	47.75	26	87	29.89
5	(Greece) Panagiotis Kalaitzakis	4	0	0	0.00	2	5	40.00	0	0	0.00
7	(Greece) Dimitris Flionis	26	26	33	78.79	23	48	47.92	19	58	32.76
9	(Greece) Michalis Tsairelis	25	44	65	67.69	77	139	55.40	12	41	29.27
11	(Greece) Stelios Poulianitis	22	14	18	77.78	12	23	52.17	10	21	47.62
14	(Greece) Vassilis Christidis	20	7	14	50.00	11	27	40.74	0	4	0.00
16	(Greece) Spyros Mourtos	26	12	18	66.67	39	77	50.65	1	15	6.67
17	(Greece) Ioannis Athinaiou	22	57	71	80.28	27	62	43.55	32	110	29.09
18	(United States) Omar Prewitt	15	21	28	75.00	11	35	31.43	13	41	31.71
31	(Austria) Bryce Douvier	14	13	13	100.00	19	41	46.34	5	29	17.24
44	(United States) Gary Bell Jr.	25	27	39	69.23	35	87	40.23	25	93	26.88
-	(United States) Kwame Vaughn	5	13	16	81.25	11	22	50.00	3	14	21.43
-	(United States) Brent Petway	6	1	5	20.00	4	9	44.44	3	7	42.86
-	(United States) Demetris Morant	6	4	6	66.67	6	10	60.00	0	0	0.00
-	(United States) Keith Benson	9	16	30	53.33	37	68	54.41	1	3	33.33
-	(United States) Kyle Weaver	10	13	18	72.22	9	26	34.62	3	13	23.08
-	(Greece) Panagiotis Vasilopoulos	12	11	15	73.33	25	59	42.37	11	31	35.48
	Team totals	26	338	495	68.28	459	947	48.57	166	591	28.09

Last updated: 13 May 2018
Source: ESAKE

=== Greek Cup ===
#	Player	GP	PTS	PPG	TR	RPG	DR	OR	AST	APG	STL	SPG	BLK	BPG
7	(Greece) Dimitris Flionis	2	3	1.50	5	2.50	4	1	0	0.00	1	0.50	0	0.00
9	(Greece) Michalis Tsairelis	2	8	4.00	11	5.50	7	4	1	0.50	1	0.50	0	0.00
11	(Greece) Stelios Poulianitis	1	0	0.00	0	0.00	0	0	0	0.00	0	0.00	0	0.00
14	(Greece) Vassilis Christidis	1	2	2.00	5	5.00	3	2	1	1.00	1	1.00	0	0.00
16	(Greece) Spyros Mourtos	2	3	1.50	3	1.50	3	0	0	0.00	0	0.00	0	0.00
17	(Greece) Ioannis Athinaiou	2	10	5.00	8	4.00	7	1	7	3.50	1	0.50	0	0.00
44	(United States) Gary Bell Jr.	2	15	7.50	5	2.50	4	1	2	1.00	2	1.00	2	1.00
-	(United States) Kwame Vaughn	2	25	12.50	5	2.50	4	1	7	3.50	4	2.00	0	0.00
-	(United States) Brent Petway	2	5	2.50	5	2.50	3	2	0	0.00	1	0.50	1	0.50
-	(United States) Keith Benson	2	21	10.50	9	4.50	5	4	1	0.50	0	0.00	2	1.00
-	(United States) Kyle Weaver	2	11	5.50	8	4.00	8	0	3	1.50	3	1.50	1	0.50
-	(Greece) Panagiotis Vasilopoulos	2	16	8.00	15	7.50	10	5	3	1.50	1	0.50	2	1.00
	Team				9		6	3						
	Team totals	2	119	59.50	88	44.00	64	24	25	12.50	15	7.50	8	4.00

==== Shooting ====
#	Player	GP	FTA	FTM	FT%	2PM	2PA	2P%	3PM	3PA	3P%
7	(Greece) Dimitris Flionis	2	0	0	0.00	0	1	0.00	1	5	20.00
9	(Greece) Michalis Tsairelis	2	2	4	50.00	3	7	42.86	0	1	0.00
11	(Greece) Stelios Poulianitis	1	0	0	0.00	0	0	0.00	0	0	0.00
14	(Greece) Vassilis Christidis	1	2	2	100.00	0	2	0.00	0	0	0.00
16	(Greece) Spyros Mourtos	2	1	2	50.00	1	3	33.33	0	1	0.00
17	(Greece) Ioannis Athinaiou	2	1	4	25.00	3	6	50.00	1	11	9.09
44	(United States) Gary Bell Jr.	2	1	1	100.00	4	8	50.00	2	6	33.33
-	(United States) Kwame Vaughn	2	5	6	83.33	4	11	36.36	4	10	40.00
-	(United States) Brent Petway	2	0	0	0.00	1	3	33.33	1	3	33.33
-	(United States) Keith Benson	2	6	6	100.00	6	19	31.58	1	1	100.00
-	(United States) Kyle Weaver	2	4	6	66.67	2	9	22.22	1	4	25.00
-	(Greece) Panagiotis Vasilopoulos	2	5	8	62.50	4	9	44.44	1	5	20.00
	Team totals	2	27	39	69.23	28	78	35.9	12	47	25.53

Last updated: 5 November 2017
Source: sportsdata.gr & sportsdata.gr

=== Basketball Champions League ===
#	Player	GP	PTS	PPG	TR	RPG	DR	OR	AST	APG	STL	SPG	BLK	BPG
3	(Montenegro) Ivan Maraš	5	63	12.60	25	5.00	17	8	3	0.60	6	1.2	0	0.00
4	(Greece) Lefteris Bochoridis	8	85	10.63	22	2.75	16	6	25	3.13	9	1.13	4	0.50
5	(Greece) Panagiotis Kalaitzakis	5	2	0.40	2	0.40	1	1	0	0.00	0	0.00	0	0.00
7	(Greece) Dimitris Flionis	14	49	3.50	21	1.5	18	3	19	1.36	15	1.07	0	0.00
9	(Greece) Michalis Tsairelis	11	99	9.00	43	3.91	21	22	12	1.09	7	0.64	1	0.09
11	(Greece) Stelios Poulianitis	11	13	1.18	8	0.73	6	2	4	0.36	2	0.18	0	0.00
14	(Greece) Vassilis Christidis	13	22	1.69	13	1.00	9	4	2	0.15	3	0.23	2	0.15
16	(Greece) Spyros Mourtos	14	36	2.57	37	2.64	21	16	6	0.43	5	0.36	3	0.21
17	(Greece) Ioannis Athinaiou	10	88	8.80	30	3.00	24	6	36	3.60	5	0.50	0	0.00
18	(United States) Omar Prewitt	5	38	7.60	10	2.00	7	3	8	1.60	3	0.60	0	0.00
31	(Austria) Bryce Douvier	3	22	7.33	27	9.00	21	6	2	0.67	0	0.00	0	0.00
44	(United States) Gary Bell Jr.	14	136	9.71	37	2.64	28	9	19	1.36	14	1.00	0	0.00
-	(United States) Kwame Vaughn	6	55	9.17	16	2.67	12	4	11	1.83	7	1.17	0	0.00
-	(United States) Brent Petway	5	22	4.40	21	4.20	15	6	1	0.20	6	1.20	3	0.60
-	(United States) Demetris Morant	3	2	0.67	4	1.33	2	2	0	0.00	0	0.00	0	0.00
-	(United States) Keith Benson	9	57	6.33	36	4.00	31	5	3	0.33	1	0.11	5	0.56
-	(United States) Kyle Weaver	9	43	4.78	26	2.89	21	5	13	1.44	6	0.67	1	0.11
-	(Greece) Panagiotis Vasilopoulos	11	98	8.91	59	5.36	50	9	28	2.55	8	0.73	11	1.00
	Team				69		42	27						
	Team totals	14	930	66.43	506	36.14	362	144	192	13.71	97	6.93	30	2.14

==== Shooting ====
#	Player	GP	FTA	FTM	FT%	2PM	2PA	2P%	3PM	3PA	3P%
3	(Montenegro) Ivan Maraš	5	13	19	68.42	16	39	41.03	6	13	46.15
4	(Greece) Lefteris Bochoridis	8	24	31	77.42	14	28	50.00	11	27	40.74
5	(Greece) Panagiotis Kalaitzakis	2	0	0	0.00	1	2	50.00	0	0	0.00
7	(Greece) Dimitris Flionis	14	7	10	70.00	12	29	41.38	6	24	25.00
9	(Greece) Michalis Tsairelis	11	27	39	69.23	30	60	50.00	4	15	26.67
11	(Greece) Stelios Poulianitis	11	0	0	0.00	5	11	45.45	1	8	12.50
14	(Greece) Vassilis Christidis	13	4	7	57.14	9	17	52.94	0	0	0.00
16	(Greece) Spyros Mourtos	14	9	14	64.29	12	26	46.15	1	3	33.33
17	(Greece) Ioannis Athinaiou	10	14	18	77.78	10	37	27.03	18	51	35.29
18	(United States) Omar Prewitt	5	7	10	70.00	5	21	23.81	7	17	41.18
31	(Austria) Bryce Douvier	3	0	0	0.00	8	18	44.44	2	7	28.57
44	(United States) Gary Bell Jr.	14	17	22	77.27	25	60	41.67	23	62	37.10
-	(United States) Kwame Vaughn	6	16	17	94.12	12	30	40.00	5	20	25.00
-	(United States) Brent Petway	5	2	5	40.00	4	12	33.33	4	16	25.00
-	(United States) Demetris Morant	3	0	0	0.00	1	4	25.00	0	0	0.00
-	(United States) Keith Benson	9	11	16	68.75	23	49	46.94	0	1	0.00
-	(United States) Kyle Weaver	9	7	8	87.50	12	21	57.14	4	12	33.33
-	(Greece) Panagiotis Vasilopoulos	11	9	14	64.29	25	56	44.64	13	25	52.00
	Team totals	14	167	230	72.61	224	520	43.08	105	301	34.88

Last updated: 7 February 2018
Source: BCL

=== Double-Double ===
#	Player	1st Statistical Category		2nd Statistical Category		Opponent	Competition	Date
1	(Greece) Panagiotis Vasilopoulos	Points	12	Rebounds	10	PAOK	Greek Cup	4 October 2017
2	(United States) Keith Benson	Points	16	Rebounds	10	Promitheas Patras	Basket League	2 December 2017
3	(Greece) Panagiotis Vasilopoulos (2)	Points	17	Rebounds	11	ČEZ Basketball Nymburk	Basketball Champions League	19 December 2017
4	(Austria) Bryce Douvier	Points	14	Rebounds	10	Koroivos	Basket League	28 January 2018
5	(Greece) Ioannis Athinaiou	Points	12	Assists	12	Lavrio Megabolt	Basket League	14 February 2018
6	(Montenegro) Ivan Maraš	Points	12	Rebounds	11	GS Larissas Faros	Basket League	17 March 2018
7	(Montenegro) Ivan Maraš (2)	Points	18	Rebounds	12	Trikala Aries	Basket League	14 April 2018
8	(Greece) Lefteris Bochoridis	Points	12	Assists	10	Kolossos H Hotels	Basket League	13 May 2018
