= 2019–20 AEK B.C. season =

AEK
2019–20 season
- Chairman: Makis Angelopoulos
- Head coach: Ilias Papatheodorou
- Arena: Nikos Galis Olympic Indoor Hall
- Greek League: Runner-up
- Greek Cup: Winner
- Champions League: Runner-Up
GBL Home	GBL Away	BCL Home
BCL Away

The 2019–20 AEK B.C. season is AEK's 63rd season in the top-tier level Greek Basket League. AEK competed in three different competitions during the season.

== Transfers 2019–20 ==
=== Players in ===
No.	Pos.	Nat.	Name	Age	Moving from		Type	Ends	Transfer fee	Date	Source
20	PG	(Greece)	Nikos Gkikas	28	Promitheas	(Greece)		July 1, 2022	Free	July 4, 2019	
4	PG	(Greece)	Vassilis Toliopoulos	23	Aris	(Greece)		July 1, 2023	Free	July 4, 2019	
14	C	(Greece)	Dimitris Kaklamanakis	24	Lavrio	(Greece)		July 1, 2021	Free	July 4, 2019	
5	SG	(United States)	Keith Langford	35	Panathinaikos	(Greece)		July 1, 2020	Free	July 29, 2019	
44	C	(United States)	Marcus Slaughter	34	Bahçeşehir	(Turkey)		July 1, 2020	Free	August 9, 2019	
0	SG	(United States)	Kendrick Ray	25	Maccabi Tel Aviv	(Israel)		July 1, 2020	Free	August 10, 2019	
22	C	(Greece)	Dimitrios Mavroeidis	34	Kolossos Rodou	(Greece)		July 1, 2020	Free	August 16, 2019	
15	PF	(Greece)	Linos Chrysikopoulos	26	PAOK	(Greece)		July 1, 2022	Free	August 24, 2019	
33	PF	(Serbia)	Stefan Janković	26	Partizan	(Serbia)	Loan	July 1, 2020	Free	August 26, 2019	
1	PG	(United States)	Mario Chalmers	33	free agent			July 1, 2020	Free	November 4, 2019	
11	SF	(Greece)	Vlado Janković	29	free agent			July 1, 2020	Free	November 11, 2019	
45	PF	(United States)	Jerai Grant	31	Strasbourg	(France)		July 1, 2020	Free	December 28, 2019	
16	SG	(Greece)	Nikos Zisis	36	Badalona	(Spain)		July 1, 2021	Free	January 17, 2020	

=== Players out ===
No.	Pos.	Nat.	Name	Age	Moving to		Type	Transfer fee	Date	Source
33	C	(United States)	Trevor Mbakwe	30	free agent			Free	July 1, 2019	
4	PG	(Greece)	Vassilis Xanthopoulos	35	Peristeri	(Greece)		Free	July 5, 2019	
0	PG	(United States)	Gabe York	25	Strasbourg	(France)		Free	July 22, 2019	
32	PF	(United States)	Vince Hunter	24	Virtus Bologna	(Italy)		Free	July 22, 2019	
25	PG	(North Macedonia)	Jordan Theodore	29	Beşiktaş	(Turkey)		Free	July 26, 2019	
5	PF	(Greece)	Dušan Šakota	33	Murcia	(Spain)		Free	July 26, 2019	
24	C	(Greece)	Vassilis Kavvadas	27	Iraklis	(Greece)		Free	July 28, 2019	
1	PF	(United States)	Delroy James	32	Samsung Thunders	(South Korea)		Free	August 3, 2019	
12	SG	(Greece)	Giannoulis Larentzakis	25	Murcia	(Spain)		Free	September 14, 2019	
7	PF	(Greece)	Georgios Tsalmpouris	23	Kolossos Rodou	(Greece)		Free	November 4, 2019	
33	PF	(Serbia)	Stefan Janković	26	Partizan	(Serbia)	End of loan	Free	December 31, 2019	
26	SF	(Cuba)	Howard Sant-Roos	28	CSKA Moscow	(Russia)	Transfer	€500,000	January 10, 2020	

== Friendlies ==
Win Loss

31 August 2019 1	Karditsa (Greece)	62–95	(Greece) AEK	Portaria
14:30 (EET)

5 September 2019 2	Rethymno (Greece)	64–66	(Greece) AEK	Portaria
17:30 (EET)

7 September 2019 3	Peristeri (Greece)	72–81	(Greece) AEK	Peristeri
20:00 (EET)

12 September 2019 4	Büyükçekmece (Turkey)	68–71	(Greece) AEK	Istanbul
18:00 (EET)

14 September 2019 5	Bahçeşehir (Turkey)	65–75	(Greece) AEK	Istanbul
16:00 (EET)
				Arena: BJK Akatlar Arena

19 September 2019 6	Partizan (Serbia)	86–80	(Greece) AEK	Belgrade
00:00 (EET)
				Arena: Štark Arena

20 September 2019 7	Mega Bemax (Serbia)	90–73	(Greece) AEK	Belgrade
20:30 (EET)

== Competitions ==
=== Overall ===
Competition	Started round	Current position / round	Final position / round	First match	Last match
Greek League	Matchday 1	—	Runner-up	28 September 2019	7 March 2020
Greek Cup	Round of 16	—	Winner	9 November 2019	16 February 2020
Champions League	Group Stage	—	Runner-up	16 October 2019	4 October 2020

Updated to match played October 3, 2020
Source: GBL Games & Results, BCL Games & Results

=== Overview ===
Competition	Record							
Competition	Pld	W	D	L	PF	PA	PD	Win %
Greek League	20	16	0	4	1,653	1,493	+160	80.00
Greek Cup	3	3	0	0	221	189	+32	100.00
Champions League	19	13	0	6	1,542	1,452	+90	68.42
Total	42	32	0	10	3,416	3,134	+282	76.19

Last updated: October 4, 2020
Source: GBL Games & Results, BCL Games & Results

=== Greek League ===
==== League table ====
Pos	Team	Pld	W	L	PF	PA	PD	Pts	Qualification or relegation
1	Panathinaikos OPAP	20	18	2	2075	1537	+538	38	Advance to play-offs
2	AEK	20	16	4	1653	1493	+160	36	Advance to play-offs
3	Peristeri Vikos Cola	20	13	7	1559	1434	+125	33	Advance to play-offs
4	Promitheas Patras	19	12	7	1449	1436	+13	31	Advance to play-offs
5	Ifaistos Limnou	20	11	9	1436	1435	+1	31	Advance to play-offs
6	Lavrio Aegean Cargo	20	11	9	1523	1597	−74	31	Advance to play-offs
7	Iraklis	20	9	11	1557	1550	+7	29	Advance to play-offs
8	Larisa	20	8	12	1524	1676	−152	28	Advance to play-offs
9	Kolossos H Hotels	20	8	12	1578	1602	−24	28	
10	Ionikos	20	8	12	1570	1709	−139	28	
11	Rethymno Cretan Kings	19	8	11	1319	1376	−57	27	
12	Panionios	20	6	14	1469	1707	−238	26	
13	Aris	20	6	14	1548	1648	−100	26	Relegation to A2 League
14	PAOK	20	5	15	1635	1695	−60	25	Relegation to A2 League

Updated to match(es) played on 7 March 2020. Source: ESAKE

==== Results summary ====
Overall						Home					Away				
Pld	W	L	PF	PA	PD	W	L	PF	PA	PD	W	L	PF	PA	PD
20	16	4	1653	1493	+160	9	1	886	747	+139	7	3	767	746	+21

Last updated: March 7, 2020.
Source: GBL Rankings

==== Results by round ====
Round	1	2	3	4	5	6	7	8	9	10	11	12	13	14	15	16	17	18	19	20	21	22	23	24	25	26
Ground	A	H	A	H	A	H	A	A	H	A	H	A	H	H	A	H	A	H	A	H	H	A	H	A	H	A
Result	L	W	L	L	L	W	W	W	W	W	W	W	W	W	W	W	W	W	W	W						
Position	11	6	11	12	14	9	7	7	6	4	4	4	3	2	2	2	2	2	2	2	2	2	2	2	2	2

Updated to match(es) played on March 7, 2020. Source: GBL Fixtures
A = Away; H = Home; W = Win; D = Draw; L = Loss

==== Regular season ====
Win Loss

28 September 2019 1	Panathinaikos	89–68	AEK	Athens
19:00 (EET)
				Arena: Olympic Indoor Hall

6 October 2019 2	AEK	93–69	Kolossos	Athens
17:00 (EET)
				Arena: Olympic Indoor Hall

12 October 2019 3	Ifaistos	72–68	AEK	Lemnos
15:45 (EET)

19 October 2019 4	AEK	90–91	Peristeri	Athens
17:00 (EET)

27 October 2019 5	Rethymno	75–67	AEK	Crete
16:15 (EET)

2 November 2019 6	AEK	91–61	Panionios	Athens
17:00 (EET)

16 November 2019 7	Iraklis	68–77	AEK	Thessaloniki
17:45 (EET)

23 November 2019 8	Lavrio	60–73	AEK	Lavrio
17:45 (EET)

30 November 2019 9	AEK	73–68	Promitheas	Athens
17:00 (EET)

7 December 2019 10	PAOK	67–71	AEK	Thessaloniki
15:15 (EET)

13 December 2019 11	AEK	92–79	Aris	Athens
19:00 (EET)

22 December 2019 12	Larisa	76–86	AEK	Larissa
19:15 (EET)
				Arena: Neapolis Indoor Arena

28 December 2019 13	AEK	103–70	Ionikos	Athens
00:00 (EET)

5 January 2020 14	AEK	100–97	Panathinaikos	Athens
21:30 (EET)

11 January 2020 15	Kolossos	70–79	AEK	Rhodes
15:00 (EET)

18 January 2020 16	AEK	74–68	Ifaistos	Athens
17:00 (EET)

25 January 2020 17	Peristeri	73–77	AEK	Athens
17:45 (EET)

26 February 2020 18	AEK	84–83	Rethymno	Athens
18:00 (EET)

29 February 2020 19	Panionios	96–101	AEK	Athens
15:30 (EET)

7 March 2020 20	AEK	86–61	Iraklis	Athens
17:30 (EET)

14 March 2020 21	AEK	vs.	Lavrio	Athens
00:00 (EET)

21 March 2020 22	Promitheas	vs.	AEK	Patras
00:00 (EET)

28 March 2020 23	AEK	vs.	PAOK	Athens
00:00 (EET)

4 April 2020 24	Aris	vs.	AEK	Thessaloniki
00:00 (EET)

11 April 2020 25	AEK	vs.	Larisa	Athens
00:00 (EET)

15 April 2020 26	Ionikos	vs.	AEK	Athens
00:00 (EET)

==== Results overview ====
Win Loss

Opposition	Home score	Away score	Double
Aris	92-79	—N/a	—N/a
Ifaistos Limnou	74-68	72-68	142-140
Kolossos H Hotels	93-69	70-79	172-139
Peristeri Vikos Cola	90-91	73-77	167-164
Larisa	—N/a	76-86	—N/a
Lavrio Aegean Cargo	—N/a	60-73	—N/a
Ionikos	103-70	—N/a	—N/a
Panathinaikos	100-97	89-68	168-186
Panionios	91-61	96-101	192-157
PAOK	—N/a	67-71	—N/a
Promitheas Patras	73-68	—N/a	—N/a
Rethymno Cretan Kings	84-83	75-67	151-158
Iraklis	86-61	68-77	163-129

=== Greek Cup ===
Win Loss

Quarterfinals

9 November 2019 Quarterfinal	AEK	71–61	Rethymno	Athens
18:00 (EET)

Semifinals

12 February 2020 Semifinal	Diagoras Dryopideon	71–89	AEK	Athens
20:00 (EET)

Final

16 February 2020 Final	AEK	61–57	Promitheas	Heraklion
17:00 (EET)

=== FIBA Champions League ===
==== Regular season - Group B ====
Pos	Team	Pld	W	L	PF	PA	PD	Pts	Qualification	JER	AEK	SPB	BAN	VEC	ANW	PAU	TGA
1	(Israel) Hapoel Jerusalem	14	11	3	1254	1151	+103	25	Advance to round of 16	—	85–78	96–91	83–72	98–87	112–94	98–76	94–72
2	(Greece) AEK	14	9	5	1093	1039	+54	23	Advance to round of 16	91–78	—	74–66	84–96	75–79	83–72	102–82	62–51
3	(Spain) San Pablo Burgos	14	8	6	1203	1132	+71	22	Advance to round of 16	91–84	93–76	—	92–84	87–71	110–78	78–82	90–76
4	(Turkey) Teksüt Bandırma	14	8	6	1149	1111	+38	22	Advance to round of 16	69–73	50–68	84–81	—	82–70	86–87	81–66	89–81
5	(Germany) Rasta Vechta	14	6	8	1135	1166	−31	20		74–83	70–81	87–93	73–81	—	89–76	93–86	79–72
6	(Poland) Anwil Włocławek	14	5	9	1212	1279	−67	19		102–107	77–79	100–90	84–89	103–92	—	95–87	80–71
7	(France) Pau-Lacq-Orthez	14	5	9	1087	1171	−84	19		81–75	67–79	80–76	76–96	75–90	85–77	—	75–57
8	(Belgium) Telenet Giants Antwerp	14	4	10	1026	1110	−84	18		73–88	73–61	60–65	93–90	74–81	99–87	74–69	—

Source: Basketball Champions League
Legend: Blue = home team win; Red = away team win.

==== Results summary ====
Overall						Home					Away				
Pld	W	L	PF	PA	PD	W	L	PF	PA	PD	W	L	PF	PA	PD
14	9	5	1093	1039	+54	5	2	571	524	+47	4	3	522	515	+7

Last updated: February 5, 2020.
Source: [https://www.championsleague.basketball/19-20/groups#

==== Results by round ====
Round	1	2	3	4	5	6	7	8	9	10	11	12	13	14
Ground	H	A	H	A	H	H	A	A	H	A	H	A	A	H
Result	W	L	W	W	W	L	W	W	W	L	L	L	W	W
Position	1	4	3	2	2	3	2	2	1	1	2	3	2	2

Updated to match(es) played on February 5, 2020. Source: [https://www.championsleague.basketball/19-20/team/AEK#
A = Away; H = Home; W = Win; D = Draw; L = Loss

==== Regular season ====
Win Loss

16 October 2019 1	AEK Athens (Greece)	102–82	(France) EB Pau-Lacq-Orthez	Athens
19:30 (EET)
		Boxscore		Arena: Nikos Galis Olympic Indoor Hall

23 October 2019 2	Hapoel Jerusalem (Israel)	85–78	(Greece) AEK Athens	Jerusalem
19:30 (EET)
		Boxscore		Arena: Pais Arena

30 October 2019 3	AEK Athens (Greece)	62–51	(Belgium) Antwerp Giants	Athens
19:30 (EET)
		Boxscore		Arena: Nikos Galis Olympic Indoor Hall

6 November 2019 4	Bandırma BK (Turkey)	50–68	(Greece) AEK Athens	Bandırma
19:00 (EET)
		Boxscore		Arena: Kara Ali Acar Sport Hall

13 November 2019 5	AEK Athens (Greece)	74–66	(Spain) San Pablo Burgos	Athens
19:30 (EET)
		Boxscore		Arena: Nikos Galis Olympic Indoor Hall

19 November 2019 6	AEK Athens (Greece)	75–79	(Germany) Rasta Vechta	Athens
19:30 (EET)
		Boxscore		Arena: Nikos Galis Olympic Indoor Hall

4 December 2019 7	Anwil Włocławek (Poland)	77–79	(Greece) AEK Athens	Włocławek
19:30 (EET)
		Boxscore		Arena: Hala Mistrzów

10 December 2019 8	EB Pau-Lacq-Orthez (France)	67–79	(Greece) AEK Athens	Pau
21:00 (EET)
		Boxscore		Arena: Palais des Sports de Pau

18 December 2019 9	AEK Athens (Greece)	91–78	(Israel) Hapoel Jerusalem	Athens
19:30 (EET)
		Boxscore		Arena: Nikos Galis Olympic Indoor Hall

8 January 2020 10	Antwerp Giants (Belgium)	73–61	(Greece) AEK Athens	Antwerp
21:00 (EET)
		Boxscore		Arena: Lotto Arena

14 January 2020 11	AEK Athens (Greece)	84–96	(Turkey) Bandırma BK	Athens
19:30 (EET)
		Boxscore		Arena: Nikos Galis Olympic Indoor Hall

22 January 2020 12	San Pablo Burgos (Spain)	93–76	(Greece) AEK Athens	Burgos
21:00 (EET)
		Boxscore		Arena: Coliseum Burgos

29 January 2020 13	Rasta Vechta (Germany)	70–81	(Greece) AEK Athens	Vechta
21:00 (EET)
		Boxscore		Arena: RASTA Dome

5 February 2020 14	AEK Athens (Greece)	83–72	(Poland) Anwil Włocławek	Athens
19:30 (EET)
		Boxscore		Arena: Nikos Galis Olympic Indoor Hall

==== Results overview ====
Win Loss

Opposition	Home score	Away score	Double
(Israel) Hapoel Jerusalem	91-78	85-78	169-163
(Turkey) Bandırma BK	84-96	50-68	152-146
(Poland) Anwil Włocławek	83-72	77-79	162-149
(France) EB Pau-Lacq-Orthez	102-82	67-79	181-149
(Germany) Rasta Vechta	75-79	70-81	156-149
(Spain) San Pablo Burgos	74-66	93-76	150-159
(Belgium) Antwerp Giants	62-51	73-61	123-124

==== Round of 16 ====
Win Loss

4 March 2020 1st Round	AEK (Greece)	92–85	(Germany) Telekom Baskets Bonn	Athens
21:30 (EET)
		Boxscore		Arena: Nikos Galis Olympic Indoor Hall

10 March 2020 2nd Round	Telekom Baskets Bonn (Germany)	86–90	(Greece) AEK	Bonn
21:00 (EET)
		Boxscore		Arena: Telekom Dome

Win Loss

Opposition	1st leg	2nd leg	3rd leg
(Germany) Telekom Baskets Bonn	92-85	86-90	-

==== Final eight ====
Win Loss

1 October 2020 Quarter-final	ERA Nymburk (Czech Republic)	82–94	(Greece) AEK	Athens
18:30 (EET)
		Boxscore		Arena: Nikos Galis Olympic Indoor Hall

2 October 2020 Semi-final	AEK (Greece)	99–75	(Spain) Zaragoza	Athens
21:30 (EET)
		Boxscore		Arena: Nikos Galis Olympic Indoor Hall

4 October 2020 Final	San Pablo Burgos (Spain)	85–74	(Greece) AEK	Athens
20:00 (EET)
		Boxscore		Arena: Nikos Galis Olympic Indoor Hall
