= 2018–19 Greek Basket League =

Greek Basket League
- Season: 2018–19
- Dates: 7 October 2018 – 15 June 2019
- Teams: 14

Regular season
- Season MVP: (Greece) Nick Calathes

Finals
- Champions: Panathinaikos OPAP
- Runners-up: Promitheas Patras
- Finals MVP: (United States) Deshaun Thomas

Statistical leaders
Points	(United States) Steve Burtt Jr.	493
Rebounds	(United States) Sean Evans	221
Assists	(Greece) Nick Calathes	151
Index Rating	(United States) Davion Berry	464

The 2018–19 Basket League season was the 27th season of the top-tier Greek professional basketball league, since its establishment in 1992, and the 79th season of top-flight Greek basketball overall. The season started on 7 October 2018, and ended on 15 June 2019. Panathinaikos OPAP won the Greek Basket League championship for a record 37th time, after beating Promitheas Patras 3–0 in the Finals.

The season featured a major feud between traditional rivals Panathinaikos and Olympiacos over refereeing decisions in the 2019 Greek Cup semifinals game between the two teams, which eventually culminated in Olympiacos also forfeiting their playoffs. Finally, Olympiacos withdrew from the championship.

== Teams ==
=== Promotion and relegation ===
Relegated from the Greek betshop.gr Basket League 2017–18 season

Koroivos and Trikala Aries were relegated, after finishing in the last two places in the 2017–18 season.

Promoted from the A2 Basket League 2017–18 season

The first club that was promoted was Peristeri, which won its third A2 Basket League championship, after finishing with a 29–1 record, in the 2017–18 season. The second team to be promoted was Holargos, as the winners of the promotion play-offs. Holargos defeated Apollon Patras 3–0, in the finals of the play-offs.

=== Locations and arenas ===
Location of clubs for the 2018–19 Greek Basket League season.

Club	Location	Arena	Capacity	App.
AEK	Athens (Marousi)	OAKA Indoor Hall	19,250	62
Aris	Thessaloniki	Alexandrio Melathron	5,138	65
Holargos	Athens (Cholargos)	Antonis Tritsis Indoor Hall	1,665	1
Ifaistos Lemnos	Myrina	Nikos Samaras Indoor Hall	1,260	1
Kolossos H Hotels	Rhodes	Venetoklio Indoor Hall	1,242	13
Kymi	Chalkida	Tasos Kampouris Kanithou Indoor Hall	1,620	3
Lavrio Aegean Cargo	Lavrio	Lavrio Indoor Hall	1,700	4
Olympiacos	Piraeus	Peace and Friendship Stadium	12,000	66
Panathinaikos OPAP	Athens (Marousi)	OAKA Indoor Hall	19,250	69
Panionios	Athens (Nea Smyrni)	Sofia Befon Indoor Hall	1,204	50
PAOK	Thessaloniki (Pylaia)	PAOK Sports Arena	8,500	62
Peristeri Vikos Cola	Athens (Peristeri)	Peristeri Arena	4,000	23
Promitheas Patras	Patras	Dimitris Tofalos Arena	4,200	3
Rethymno Cretan Kings	Rethymno	Melina Merkouri Sports Arena	1,600	9

=== Personnel and sponsorship ===
Club	Head coach	Captain	Kit manufacturer	Main shirt sponsor
AEK	(Italy) Luca Banchi	(Greece) Dušan Šakota	Fila	Betshop.gr
Aris	(Greece) Ioannis Kastritis	(Greece) Lefteris Bochoridis	Spalding	-
Holargos	(Greece) Aris Lykogiannis	(United States) Toarlyn Fitzpatrick	BillyBro	BoConcept
Ifaistos Limnou	(Greece) Sotiris Manolopoulos	(Greece) Sotirios Manolopoulos	GSA Sport	-
Kolossos H Hotels	(Greece) Stergios Koufos	(Greece) Ioannis Georgallis	Fila	Aegean Airlines
Kymi	(Greece) Isidoros Koutsos	(Greece) Stavros Toutziarakis	Nickan	-
Lavrio Aegean Cargo	(Greece) Christos Serelis	(Greece) Michalis Perrakis	Athios	Advanced Hair Clinics
Olympiacos	(Israel) (United States) David Blatt	(Greece) Vassilis Spanoulis	Nike	bwin
Panathinaikos OPAP	(United States) (Italy) Rick Pitino	(Greece) (United States) Nick Calathes	Adidas	Pame Stoixima
Panionios	(Greece) Vassilis Fragkias	(Greece) Nikos Diplaros	Nickan	-
PAOK	(Greece) Ilias Papatheodorou	(Greece) Vangelis Margaritis	Erreà	Watt+Volt
Peristeri Vikos Cola	(Greece) Argyris Pedoulakis	(Greece) Panagiotis Vasilopoulos	Flex One	Vikos Cola
Promitheas Patras	(Greece) Makis Giatras	(Greece) Nikos Gkikas	Athios	Medfrigo
Rethymno Cretan Kings	(Greece) Vangelis Ziagkos	(Cyprus) Antreas Christodoulou	Nickan	-

=== Head coaching changes ===
Team	Outgoing Head Coach	Manner of departure	Date of vacancy	Position in table	Replaced with	Date of appointment
Panionios	(Greece) Vangelis Alexandris	End of contract	18 May 2018	Preseason	(Greece) Thanasis Skourtopoulos	29 June 2018
Ifaistos Limnou	(Greece) Thanasis Skourtopoulos	End of contract	1 June 2018	Preseason	(Greece) Sotiris Manolopoulos	8 June 2018
AEK	(Greece) (Serbia) Dragan Šakota	Promoted to General Manager	6 June 2018	Preseason	(Italy) Luca Banchi	1 July 2018
Olympiacos	(Greece) Ioannis Sfairopoulos	End of contract	18 June 2018	Preseason	(United States) / (Israel) David Blatt	27 June 2018
Panionios	(Greece) Thanasis Skourtopoulos	Re-signed	28 August 2018	Preseason	(Greece) Chris Chougkaz	2 September 2018
Panionios	(Greece) Chris Chougkaz	Re-signed	30 October 2018	11th (1-3)	(Greece) Vassilis Fragkias	31 October 2018
Panionios	(Greece) Vassilis Fragkias	Re-signed	21 November 2018	9th (2-4)	(Greece) Nikos Oikonomou	24 November 2018
Kolossos H Hotels	(Greece) Nikos Vetoulas	Sacked	22 November 2018	12th (1–5)	(Greece) Kostas Flevarakis	1 December 2018
Kymi	(Greece) Ioannis Kastritis	Sacked	25 November 2018	13th (1–6)	(Greece) Isidoros Koutsos	26 November 2018

== Regular season ==
=== League table ===
Pos	Team	Pld	W	L	PF	PA	PD	Pts	Qualification or relegation
1	AEK	26	18	8	2129	1995	+134	44	Advanced to playoffs
2	Peristeri Vikos Cola	26	17	9	2009	1977	+32	43 (Note: Peristeri Vikos Cola and Panathinaikos OPAP finished tied with 43 points. The two clubs split their head to head season series 1–1. Peristeri won the head to head point differential in their two games against Panathinaikos OPAP by 3 points.)	Advanced to playoffs
3	Panathinaikos OPAP (Note: Panathinaikos OPAP did not receive a point for their forfeited loss to Kymi. As a punishment for forfeiting the game, Panathinaikos was deducted 6 points in the league standings.)	26	24	2	2151	1668	+483	43	Advanced to playoffs
4	Promitheas Patras	26	16	10	2003	1907	+96	42	Advanced to playoffs
5	PAOK	26	15	11	1992	1955	+37	41	Advanced to playoffs
6	Olympiacos (Note: Olympiacos did not receive a point for their forfeited loss to Panathinaikos OPAP. As a punishment, Olympiacos was deducted 8 points in the league standings.) (R)	26	23	3	2108	1708	+400	40	Advanced to playoffs
7	Ifaistos Limnou	26	13	13	1914	1995	−81	39	Advanced to playoffs
8	Holargos	26	12	14	1850	1899	−49	38	Advanced to playoffs
9	Aris	26	8	18	1811	1883	−72	34 (Note: Aris, Rethymno Cretan Kings, Panionios, and Kymi finished tied with 34 points. The tie breakers resulted with Aris in 9th place, Rethymno in 10th place, Panionios in 11th place, and Kymi in 12th place.)	
10	Rethymno Cretan Kings	26	8	18	1906	2053	−147	34	
11	Panionios	26	8	18	1950	2210	−260	34	
12	Kymi	26	8	18	1899	2100	−201	34	
13	Lavrio Aegean Cargo (R)	26	7	19	1997	2123	−126	33	Relegated to Greek A2 League
14	Kolossos H Hotels (R)	26	5	21	1958	2204	−246	31	Relegated to Greek A2 League

Source: ESAKE
(R) Relegated

=== Results ===
Home \ Away	AEK	ARIS	HOL	IFA	KOL	KYMI	LAV	OLY	PAO	PNN	PAOK	PER	PRO	RET
AEK	—	81–73	73–63	83–69	94–79	96–92	83–64	67–76	72–104	73–62	91–71	96–70	83–62	82–62
Aris	77–81	—	58–59	65–54	75–81	95–60	84–70	64–68	70–84	79–56	58–62	62–68	66–65	81–87
Holargos	70–81	76–63	—	65–62	74–60	73–66	82–71	68–73	64–81	74–73	74–68	75–76	57–69	66–61
Ifaistos Limnou	74–87	73–64	72–70	—	82–76	81–74	80–76	53–73	62–84	86–64	80–79	77–73	82–67	77–80
Kolossos H Hotels	69–106	61–72	75–81	60–78	—	97–90	76–80	67–86	78–88	106–109	60–75	77–84	68–83	74–63
Kymi	67–78	75–57	57–66	90–83	91–86	—	89–88	74–77	62–87	92–82	73–90	56–87	86–82	77–84
Lavrio Aegean Cargo	94–100	70–73	76–69	96–76	74–70	86–68	—	76–81	55–80	90–60	64–77	83–55	73–85	93–94
Olympiacos	101–75	76–67	88–78	83–46	95–74	92–69	102–63	—	0–20	98–72	80–59	92–69	86–59	84–60
Panathinaikos OPAP	111–79	85–65	86–64	93–65	95–68	0–20	108–63	79–70	—	96–71	89–51	80–75	87–76	88–64
Panionios	78–74	70–66	90–110	76–93	88–80	89–93	101–91	65–101	67–88	—	69–73	77–75	60–74	88–72
PAOK	88–79	95–79	80–73	73–75	79–83	78–60	99–88	68–78	83–93	83–73	—	87–73	81–56	81–64
Peristeri Vikos Cola	83–80	81–61	71–62	89–81	73–70	94–93	87–78	81–76	80–72	74–71	83–65	—	79–86	80–64
Promitheas Patras	79–69	71–61	86–61	73–68	101–95	94–61	71–63	77–80	69–86	104–67	82–59	73–76	—	86–81
Rethymno Cretan Kings	57–66	74–76	83–76	82–85	93–67	78–64	72–77	58–92	75–87	65–72	78–88	83–73	72–73	—

Source: ESAKE
Legend: Blue = home team win; Red = away team win.
Matches with lighter background shading were decided after overtime.

== Playoffs ==
The eight highest ranked teams in the regular season qualified for the playoffs. All series will be played with a 2–2–1 format.

=== Bracket ===
Quarter-finals
AEK	2
Holargos	1
Promitheas Patras	2
PAOK	0
Peristeri Vikos Cola	2
Ifaistos Limnou	1
Panathinaikos OPAP	w/o ^{1}
Olympiacos

Semi-finals
AEK	2
Promitheas Patras	3
Peristeri Vikos Cola	0
Panathinaikos OPAP	3

Final
Panathinaikos OPAP	3
Promitheas Patras	0
Third place
AEK	3
Peristeri Vikos Cola	1

=== Quarterfinals ===
Team 1	Series	Team 2	Game 1	Game 2	Game 3
AEK	2–1	Holargos	84–62	72–88	88–75
Peristeri Vikos Cola	2–1	Ifaistos Limnou	84–81	71–77	74–64
Panathinaikos OPAP	w/o	Olympiacos	20–0	20–0	
Promitheas Patras	2–0	PAOK	81–66	76–68	

=== Semifinals ===
Team 1	Series	Team 2	Game 1	Game 2	Game 3	Game 4	Game 5
AEK	2–3	Promitheas Patras	83–82	65–74	88–60	54–70	84–85
Peristeri Vikos Cola	0–3	Panathinaikos OPAP	68–91	66–86	75–82		

==== Third-place series ====
Team 1	Series	Team 2	Game 1	Game 2	Game 3	Game 4	Game 5
AEK	3–1	Peristeri Vikos Cola	66–67	79–71	91–83	83–82	

=== Finals ===
Team 1	Series	Team 2	Game 1	Game 2	Game 3	Game 4	Game 5
Panathinaikos OPAP	3–0	Promitheas Patras	103–77	92–80	111–77		

^{1} Olympiacos refused to participate in their playoff series against Panathinaikos over refereeing disputes.

== Final standings ==
Pos	Team	Overall record			Qualification or Relegation
		Pld	W	L	
1.	Panathinaikos	33	31	2	Qualification to the EuroLeague; *Club qualified for EuroLeague by having a contract
2.	Promitheas Patras	36	21	15	Qualification to the EuroCup
3.	AEK Athens	38	25	13	Qualification to the Champions League; *AEK declined EuroCup participation
4.	Peristeri	36	20	16	Qualification to the Champions League
5.	PAOK	28	15	13	Qualification to the Champions League
6.	Ifaistos Limnou	29	14	15	
7.	Holargos	29	13	16	Relegation to the Greek A2 League
8.	Aris	26	8	18	
9.	Rethymno	26	8	18	
10.	Panionios	26	8	18	
11.	Kymi	26	8	18	Relegation to the Greek A2 League
12.	Lavrio	26	7	19	
13.	Kolossos Rodou	26	5	21	
14.	Olympiacos	27	23	4	Qualification to the EuroLeague; *Club qualified for EuroLeague by having a contract

NOTES:

- Holargos was faced financial problems. The club's registered place in the top-tier Greek Basket League was purchased by Kolossos Rodou, which thus avoided being relegated.
- Kymi was faced financial problems. The club's registered place in the top-tier Greek Basket League was purchased by Lavrio, which thus avoided being relegated.
- Olympiacos was relegated on 22 May 2019, following a meeting of the Hellenic Basketball Clubs Association's Board of Directors. This was due to the club refusing to play in its playoff series against Panathinaikos, which marked its third forfeited game of the season, and which resulted in an automatic relegation, per league rules. The league also stripped the team of all of its season wins, as a further punishment.

== Awards ==
All official awards of the 2018–19 Greek Basket League.

=== Greek League MVP ===
Player	Team
(Greece) Nick Calathes	Panathinaikos

=== Greek League Finals MVP ===
Player	Team
(United States) Deshaun Thomas	Panathinaikos

=== All-Greek League Team ===
Pos.	Player	Team
G	(Greece) Nick Calathes	Panathinaikos
G	(United States) Davion Berry	Panionios
F	(Greece) Ioannis Papapetrou	Panathinaikos
F	(Greece) Panagiotis Vasilopoulos	Peristeri
C	(Serbia) Nikola Milutinov	Olympiacos

=== Best Coach ===
Player	Team
(Greece) Makis Giatras	Apollon Patras

=== Defensive Player of the Year ===
Player	Team
(Cuba) Howard Sant-Roos	AEK

=== Best Young Player ===
Player	Team
(Greece) Zois Karampelas	Peristeri

=== Most Improved Player ===
Player	Team
(Greece) Dimitris Kaklamanakis	Lavrio

=== Most Popular Player ===
Player	Team
(Greece) Nick Calathes	Panathinaikos

=== Most Spectacular Player ===
Player	Team
(Greece) Thanasis Antetokounmpo	Panathinaikos

== Statistical leaders ==
The Greek Basket League counts official stats leaders by stats totals, and not by per game averages. It also counts the total stats for both regular season combined.

=== Performance index rating ===
Pos	Player	Club	PIR
1	(United States) Davion Berry	Panionios	464
2	(United States) Steve Burtt Jr.	Rethymno	458
3	(Serbia) Nikola Milutinov	Olympiacos	448
4	(United States) Chris Horton	Kymis	442
5	(United States) Sean Evans	Ifaistos Limnou	440

=== Points ===
Pos	Player	Club	Total Points
1	(United States) Steve Burtt Jr.	Rethymno	493
2	(United States) Davion Berry	Panionios	463
3	(United States) Doron Lamb	Lavrio	367
4	(Greece) Vlado Janković	Holargos	346
5	(United States) Vince Hunter	AEK	346

=== Rebounds ===
Pos	Player	Club	Total Rebounds
1	(United States) Sean Evans	Ifaistos Limnou	221
2	(United States) Chris Horton	Kymis	210
3	(Greece) Dimitris Mavroeidis	Kolossos Rodou	185
4	(United States) Danny Agbelese	Holargos	185
5	(United States) Gary McGhee	Aris	180

=== Assists ===
Pos	Player	Club	Total Assists
1	(Greece) Nick Calathes	Panathinaikos	151
2	(United States) Nigel Williams-Goss	Olympiacos	106
3	(United States) Tyrone Brazelton	Ifaistos Limnou	102
4	(Greece) Nikos Gkikas	Promitheas Patras	95
5	(United States) JeQuan Lewis	Kymis	91

== Clubs in European-wide competitions ==
Team	Competition	Progress
Olympiacos	EuroLeague	Regular season
Panathinaikos	EuroLeague	Playoffs
AEK	Champions League	Quarterfinals
PAOK	Champions League	Round of 16
Promitheas	Champions League	Round of 16
Aris	Champions League	Second qualifying round
Aris	FIBA Europe Cup	Regular season
Lavrio	FIBA Europe Cup	First qualifying round

== Clubs in World-wide competitions ==
Team	Competition	Progress
AEK	FIBA Intercontinental Cup	Final 4, 1st place

== See also ==
- 2018–19 Greek Basketball Cup
- 2018–19 Greek A2 Basket League (2nd tier)
