= 2019–20 Greek Basket League =

Greek Basket League
- Season: 2019–20
- Dates: 28 September 2019 – 8 March 2020
- Teams: 14

Finals
- Champions: Panathinaikos OPAP (38th title)
- Runners-up: AEK

Statistical leaders
Points	(United States) Conner Frankamp	397
Rebounds	(United States) Sean Evans	186
Assists	(Greece) Nick Calathes	137
Index Rating	(United States) Conner Frankamp	406

The 2019–20 Basket League season was the 28th season of the top-tier Greek professional basketball league, since its establishment in 1992, and the 80th season of top-flight Greek basketball overall. The season started in September 2019, and ended prematurely in March 2020, due to the COVID-19 pandemic. On 21 May 2020, after a vote that was held between the league's 14 teams, Panathinaikos was crowned the Greek basketball league's champion for the season, marking the club's 38th Greek championship. The league's 14 teams also agreed that none of the teams would be relegated.

== Proposed format changes ==
On 15 May 2019, the Greek Basket League announced that it was planning to expand from 14 teams to 16 teams, and that there were no league relegations scheduled from the previous 2018–19 Greek Basket League season. The teams that were scheduled to be promoted up from the secondary level Greek A2 Basket League, were to be inserted into the new 16-team league, for the 2019–20 season. However, Olympiacos was later relegated on 22 May 2019, following a meeting of the Hellenic Basketball Clubs Association's Board of Directors.

Olympiacos was relegated because the club refused to play in its playoff series against Panathinaikos. That marked the club's third forfeited game of the season, which resulted in an automatic relegation, per league rules. As further punishment, the league also stripped Olympiacos of its season wins. The league also eventually cancelled the planned expansion to 16 teams, after the proposal was rejected by the Hellenic Basketball Federation.

== Teams ==
=== Promotion and relegation ===
Relegated from the Greek Basket League 2018–19 season

Olympiacos decided not to play against Panathinaikos in the league's playoffs, and was thus relegated down to the Greek Second Division as punishment. In addition, all of the club's wins were voided by league officials.

Promoted from the Greek A2 Basket League 2018–19 season

Ionikos Nikaias won the A2 League championship, and was thus promoted up to the first tier level, for the first time in 32 years. Iraklis Thessaloniki was also promoted, as a result of winning the playoffs round of the Greek second division. The club returned to the top-level league, after an absence of 8 years.

=== Locations and arenas ===
Location of clubs for the 2019–20 Greek Basket League season.

Club	Location	Arena	Capacity	App.
AEK	Athens (Marousi)	OAKA Indoor Hall	19,250	63
Aris	Thessaloniki	Alexandrio Melathron	5,138	66
Ifaistos Lemnos	Myrina	Nikos Samaras Indoor Hall	1,260	2
Ionikos Nikaias Affidea	Athens (Palaio Faliro)	Sofia Befon Indoor Hall	1,204	13
Iraklis Thessaloniki	Thessaloniki	Ivanofeio Sports Arena	2,500	52
Kolossos H Hotels	Rhodes	Kallithea Palais des Sports	1,400	14
Larisa	Larissa	Larissa Neapolis Indoor Arena	4,000	1
Lavrio Megabolt	Lavrio	Lavrio Indoor Hall	1,700	5
Panathinaikos OPAP	Athens (Marousi)	OAKA Indoor Hall	19,250	70
Panionios Su Casa	Athens (Palaio Faliro)	Sofia Befon Indoor Hall	1,204	51
PAOK	Thessaloniki (Pylaia)	PAOK Sports Arena	8,500	63
Peristeri Winmasters	Athens (Peristeri)	Peristeri Arena	4,000	24
Promitheas Patras	Patras	Dimitris Tofalos Arena	4,200	4
Rethymno Cretan Kings	Rethymno	Melina Merkouri Sports Arena	1,600	10

=== Head coaching changes ===
Team	Outgoing manager	Manner of departure	Date of vacancy	Position in table	Replaced with	Date of appointment
(Greece) Panathinaikos	(United States) Rick Pitino	Mutual consent	21 June 2019	Preseason	(Greece) Argyris Pedoulakis	21 June 2019

== Regular season ==
=== League table ===
Pos	Team	Pld	W	L	PF	PA	PD	Pts	Qualification or relegation
1	Panathinaikos OPAP (C)	20	18	2	2075	1537	+538	38	Already qualified to EuroLeague
2	AEK Athens	20	16	4	1653	1493	+160	36	Qualification to Champions League
3	Peristeri Winmasters	20	13	7	1559	1434	+125	33	Qualification to Champions League
4	Promitheas Patras	19	12	7	1449	1436	+13	31	Qualification to EuroCup
5	Ifaistos Limnou	20	11	9	1436	1435	+1	31	
6	Lavrio Megabolt	20	11	9	1523	1597	−74	31	
7	Iraklis	20	9	11	1557	1550	+7	29	Qualification to Champions League qualifying rounds
8	Larisa	20	8	12	1524	1676	−152	28	
9	Kolossos H Hotels	20	8	12	1578	1602	−24	28	
10	Ionikos Nikaias Affidea	20	8	12	1570	1709	−139	28	
11	Rethymno Cretan Kings	19	8	11	1319	1376	−57	27	
12	Panionios Su Casa	20	6	14	1469	1707	−238	26	
13	Aris Thessaloniki (Note: On 21 May 2020, the league agreed there was no relegation to the 2020–21 Greek A2 Basket League for the 13th and 14th team this season.)	20	6	14	1548	1648	−100	26	
14	PAOK	20	5	15	1635	1695	−60	25	

Updated to match(es) played on 8 March 2020. Source: ESAKE
(C) Champions

=== Results ===
Home \ Away	AEK	ARI	IFA	ION	IRA	KOL	LAR	LAV	PTH	PNN	POK	PER	PRO	RET
AEK	—	92–79	74–68	103–70	86–61	93–69			100–97	91–61		90–91	73–68	84–83
Aris		—	88–77	72–77	69–63	85–87	90–72	61–73	81–88	80–86	85–82	72–59		
Ifaistos	72–68	85–59	—	68–79	79–65	72–64		67–65		79–74	77–69		72–75	66–50
Ionikos		72–65		—	88–74	79–86	68–64	90–94	65–110	108–74	83–66	100–95	69–73	
Iraklis	68–77	82–66		107–75	—		83–67	92–62		96–101	99–82	69–76		74–56
Kolossos	70–79	90–86			86–88	—	80–83	73–74	69–103	89–61	87–66	101–84	73–70	
Larisa		92–78	58–63	82–72	74–87	95–90	—		68–110		95–85		69–96	82–65
Lavrio	80–73		66–61	75–67		78–68	86–72	—	81–112	104–71	92–88	75–57		86–78
Panathinaikos	89–68	108–86	87–74	107–71	130–81		121–78	105–74	—		117–79		99–68	96–74
Panionios	96–101		69–83		60–76	76–67	74–71	71–77	74–115	—	97–87	48–61	88–69	70–67
PAOK	67–71	101–84	94–74	110–80		77–88	87–61		88–104		—	68–75	86–90	78–56
Peristeri	73–77		75–79		75–59		101–63	88–62	82–78	95–69	80–75	—	78–64	71–61
Promitheas		95–79	81–61	87–80		81–80	62–76	77–66	76–99	87–76		64–60	—	
Rethymno	75–67	70–63	75–59	90–76	69–63	72–61		75–77		73–61		60–79	70–63	—

Legend: Blue = home team win; Red = away team win.

== Statistical leaders ==
The Greek Basket League counts official stats leaders by stats totals, and not by per game averages. It also counts the total stats for both regular season combined.

=== Performance Index Rating ===
Pos	Player	Club	PIR
1	(United States) Conner Frankamp	Rethymno	406
2	(United States) Keith Langford	AEK	358
3	(Greece) Kostas Mitoglou	Panathinaikos	351
4	(Greece) Loukas Mavrokefalidis	Promitheas Patras	331
5	(Montenegro) Vladimir Dragičević	Aris	321

=== Points ===
Pos	Player	Club	Total Points
1	(United States) Conner Frankamp	Rethymno	397
2	(United States) Keith Langford	AEK	346
3	(Canada) Olivier Hanlan	Iraklis	326
4	(United States) Lasan Kromah	Kolossos Rodou	314
5	(Greece) Loukas Mavrokefalidis	Promitheas Patras	298

=== Rebounds ===
Pos	Player	Club	Total Rebounds
1	(United States) Sean Evans	Ifaistos	186
2	(Greece) Kostas Mitoglou	Panathinaikos	148
3	(Montenegro) Vladimir Dragičević	Aris	142
4	(Bosnia and Herzegovina) Milan Milošević	Aris	140
5	(United States) Wesley Gordon	Rethymno	129

=== Assists ===
Pos	Player	Club	Total Assists
1	(Greece) Nick Calathes	Panathinaikos	137
2	(Greece) Nondas Papantoniou	Larisa	100
3	(United States) Tyrese Rice	Panathinaikos	87
4	(United States) Langston Hall	Promitheas	80
5	(United States) Conner Frankamp	Rethymno	79

== Clubs in European-wide competitions ==
Team	Competition	Result
Panathinaikos	EuroLeague	Regular season, Cancelled due to COVID-19 pandemic, 6th place
Promitheas	EuroCup	Playoffs, Quarterfinals, Cancelled due to COVID-19 pandemic
AEK	FIBA Champions League	Final 8, 2nd place
Peristeri	FIBA Champions League	Playoffs, Round of 16
PAOK	FIBA Champions League	Regular season, 7th place

== See also ==
- 2019–20 Greek Basketball Cup
- 2019–20 Greek A2 Basket League (2nd tier)
