= Ifaistos Limnou B.C. =

Ifaistos Limnou
- Nickname: Ta Sfyria (The Hammers)
- Founded: 2017; 9 years ago
- Folded: 2020; 6 years ago
- Arena: Kleisto Gimnastirio Myrinas Nikos Samaras
- Capacity: 1,260
- Location: Myrina, Lemnos, Greece
- Team colors: Burgundy, Black, and White
Home	Away

Ifaistos Limnou B.C. (also known as: Ifestos Limnou B.C. or Hephaestus Lemnos B.C.) (Greek: Ήφαιστος Λήμνου K.A.E.) was a Greek professional basketball club that was based on the Greek island of Lemnos, in Myrina. The club was named after the Greek god Hephaestus.

== History ==
Foinix Larissas was replaced in its Greek competition by Gymnastikos S. Larissas, after the two clubs merged in 2015, thus ending Foinix's presence in Greek basketball competitions. The club played in the 3rd-tier level Greek B League during the 2015–16 season, and was promoted to the 2nd-tier level Greek A2 League, for the 2016–17 season.

In the summer of 2017, Gymnastikos then merged with Faros Keratsiniou, and then took Faros' place in the upcoming top-tier level Greek Basket League's 2017–18 season. Faros retained all of its amateur and junior clubs. Gymnastikos' club name then officially became Gymnastikos Syllogos Larissas Faros 2017, abbreviated as G.S.L. Faros 2017.

Ifaistos Lemnou was then officially created on 25 October 2017, under the ownership of Pantelis Boumbouras, and being based in Myrina, on the Greek island of Lemnos. In July 2018, Ifaistos merged with GSL Faros. After the merger of the two clubs, GSL Faros' club history was then returned to the club, which was re-named to Gymnastikos S. Larissas 1928. The club played its first official game against Peristeri, on 3 October 2018, in the Round 16 phase of the Greek Cup. Ifaistos lost the game, by a score of 91–81.

After the end of the 2019–20 Greek Basket League season, the club was disbanded.

== Arena ==
The club played its home games at the 1,260 seat capacity Nikos Samaras Indoor Hall, which is located in Myrina, on the Greek Island of Lemnos. The arena is named after the late Greek volleyball player Nikos Samaras.

== Season by season ==
Season	Tier	League	Pos.	W–L	Greek Cup	European competitions
2018–19	1	Basket League	6th	Round of 16		
2019–20	1	Basket League	5th	Quarterfinals		

== Notable players ==
Note: Flags indicate national team eligibility at FIBA-sanctioned events. Players may hold other non-FIBA nationalities not displayed.

Criteria

To appear in this section a player must have either:

- Set a club record or won an individual award while at the club
- Played at least one official international match for their national team at any time
- Played at least one official NBA match at any time.

Greece:

- Dimitris Charitopoulos
- Georgios Diamantakos
- Costis Gontikas
- Sotirios Manolopoulos
- Spyros Mourtos
- Michalis Pelekanos
- Dimitris Stamatis
- Michalis Tsairelis

Europe:

- Rolands Freimanis
- Vlad Moldoveanu

USA:

- Tyrone Brazelton
- Sean Evans
- Marcus Gilbert
- Toddrick Gotcher
- Cliff Hammonds
- Mario Little
- Jerry Smith
- Antwaine Wiggins

== Head coaches ==
- Sotiris Manolopoulos
