= Ioannis Athinaiou =

Greek basketball player (born 1988)

Personal information
- Born: May 27, 1988 (age 38) Cholargos, Athens, Greece
- Listed height: 6 ft 4.5 in (1.94 m)
- Listed weight: 212 lb (96 kg)

Career information
- NBA draft: 2010: undrafted
- Playing career: 2006–present
- Position: Point guard / Shooting guard

Career history
- 2006–2009: Ilysiakos
- 2009–2011: Panionios
- 2011–2012: KAOD
- 2012–2013: Panionios
- 2013–2014: Aris Thessaloniki
- 2014: Olimpia Milano
- 2014: Eskişehir
- 2014–2015: AEK Athens
- 2015–2017: Olympiacos
- 2017–2018: Aris Thessaloniki
- 2018–2019: PAOK Thessaloniki
- 2019: Fos Provence
- 2019–2020: Panathinaikos
- 2020: Peristeri
- 2020–2021: Promitheas Patras
- 2021: Bilbao
- 2021–2022: Ionikos Nikaias
- 2022–2023: Karditsa
- 2023–2025: Panerythraikos

Career highlights
- 2x Greek League champion (2016, 2020); Greek League All-Star (2014)

Ioannis Athinaiou (alternate spellings: Giannis, Yiannis, Yannis, Athineou, Athinaioy) (Greek: Ιωάννης Αθηναίου; born May 27, 1988) is a Greek former professional basketball player. He is 1.94 m (6 ft 4 1/2 in) tall. and 96 kg (212 lbs). He can play at both the point guard and shooting guard positions.

== Youth career ==
At a young age, Athinaiou began playing youth system basketball in Greece. He started playing with the youth teams of Poseidonas, a club that is located in Psychiko, Athens,.

== Professional career ==
Athinaiou first played professionally with the Greek clubs Ilysiakos, Panionios, and KAOD. In the summer of 2009, he signed a 4-year contract with Panionios. He joined the Greek League club Aris Thessaloniki, in 2013.

Athinaiou joined the Italian League club Olimpia Milano, in 2014. In May, he parted ways with the team. He signed with the Greek EuroLeague team Olympiacos Piraeus, in 2015. With Olympiacos, he won the Greek League championship in 2016. He returned to Aris Thessaloniki, for the 2017–18 season.

On July 29, 2018, Athinaiou signed a two-year contract with Aris' arch-rivals, PAOK Thessaloniki. In January 2019, he joined the French League club Fos Provence.

On August 12, 2019, Athinaiou moved to the Greek EuroLeague club Panathinaikos Athens. After joining Panathinaikos, Athinaiou became the first player in history to be a member of all five of the largest Greek basketball teams, having been a member of Panathinaikos, Olympiacos, AEK, PAOK and Aris. However, just a few days later, Athinaiou unfortunately suffered a torn ACL knee injury, in one of the Greek national team's preparation games against Serbia, just two weeks prior to the start of 2019 FIBA World Cup. As a result of the injury, Athinaiou missed the entirety of the following COVID-19 pandemic shortened 2019–20 season.

On July 16, 2020, Athinaiou signed with the Greek club Peristeri. On December 17, however, he was released from Peristeri after the acquisition of Vangelis Mantzaris. The following day, Athinaiou signed with Promitheas Patras, in an unofficial "swap" between the two teams. On April 17, 2021, Athinaiou agreed to move to Spanish club RETAbet Bilbao Basket for the rest of the season, replacing the injured Jonathan Rousselle.

On August 6, 2021, Athinaiou signed with Ionikos. In 18 games, he averaged 9 points, 3.2 rebounds and 4.4 assists, playing around 25 minutes per contest.

For the 2022–2023 season, Athinaiou moved to the newly promoted Karditsa, where he was named team captain. In 21 league games, he averaged 4.3 points, 1 rebound and 2.9 assists in 19 minutes per contest.

== National team career ==
Athinaiou was a member of the Greek university national team. He played at the 2007 World University Games. He has also been a member of the senior Greek national basketball team. He played with Greece at the 2016 Turin FIBA World Olympic Qualifying Tournament. He also played at the 2019 FIBA World Cup qualification, where he had a game-winning buzzer-beating 3 pointer against Great Britain.

== Awards and accomplishments ==
- Greek League All-Star: (2014)
- 2x Greek League Champion: (2016, 2020)
