= Stelios Poulianitis =

Greek basketball player

No. 11 – Aris Thessaloniki
- Position: Point guard / shooting guard
- League: Greek Basketball League

Personal information
- Born: 3 April 1995 (age 31) Thessaloniki, Greece
- Listed height: 6 ft 2.75 in (1.90 m)
- Listed weight: 200 lb (91 kg)

Career information
- Playing career: 2013–present

Career history
- 2013–2018: Aris Thessaloniki
- 2015–2016: →Koroivos Amaliadas
- 2016–2017: →Trikala
- 2018–2019: Kymi
- 2019–2020: Kolossos Rodou
- 2020–2021: Apollon Patras
- 2021–2022: Aris Thessaloniki
- 2022–2025: Peristeri
- 2025–present: Aris Thessaloniki

Career highlights
- Greek 2nd Division champion (2021)

Stylianos "Stelios" Poulianitis (Greek: Στυλιανός "Στέλιος" Πουλιανίτης; born 3 April 1995) is a Greek professional basketball player for Aris of the Greek Basketball League. He is a 1.90 m (6 ft 2 3/4 in) tall combo guard.

== Professional career ==
=== Aris (2013–2018) ===
Poulianitis began his pro career with the Greek League club Aris Thessaloniki, in the 2013–14 season. He was loaned to the Greek club Koroivos Amaliadas, for the 2015–16 season, and to the Greek club Aries Trikala, for the 2016–17 season. He then returned to Aris for the 2017–18 season.

=== Kymi (2018–2019) ===
On 14 June 2018, Poulianitis left Aris Thessaloniki and joined Kymi of the Greek Basket League.

=== Kolossos Rodou (2019–2020) ===
On 16 August 2019, Poulianitis signed a two-year deal with the Greek club Kolossos Rodou, but he only spent one season with them.

=== Apollon Patras (2020–2021) ===
Poulianitis won the 2nd division championship with Apollon Patras, in the 2020–21 season.

=== Return to Aris (2021–2022) ===
Poulianitis agreed to return to the Greek club Aris, on 11 August 2021. In 23 domestic Greek league games, he averaged 4.8 points, 1.4 rebounds, 1.4 assists and 0.6 steals, while playing around 19 minutes per contest.

=== Peristeri (2022–2025) ===
On 9 July 2022, Poulianitis signed a two-year (1+1) contract with the Greek club Peristeri. In 28 domestic Greek league games, he averaged 3.4 points, 1.7 rebounds and 1.3 assists in 14 minutes per contest. Additionally, in 6 FIBA Champions League matches, he averaged 3.3 points, in 13 minutes per contest. On 20 June 2023, Poulianitis renewed his contract with Peristeri through 2025.

=== Third stint with Aris (2025–present) ===
On July 30, 2025, Poulianitis made his return to Aris, signing through 2027.

== National team career ==
Poulianitis was a member of the Greek junior national teams. With the junior national teams of Greece, Poulianitis played at the 2011 FIBA Europe Under-16 Championship, the 2014 FIBA Europe Under-20 Championship, and the 2015 FIBA Europe Under-20 Championship.

== Personal life ==
Poulianitis originates from Trikala, Greece. His father Vangelis, is a former basketball player, who played in the Greek Basket League with Panellinios Athens and Philippos Thessaloniki.
