= Bryce Douvier =

American-Austrian basketball player

No. 31 – BC Pärnu
- Position: Forward
- League: Korvpalli Meistriliiga

Personal information
- Born: 1 December 1991 (age 34) Salzburg, Austria
- Listed height: 6 ft 7 in (2.01 m)
- Listed weight: 230 lb (104 kg)

Career information
- High school: Sedgwick (Sedgwick, Kansas)
- College: Texas A&M–Corpus Christi (2013–2016)
- NBA draft: 2016: undrafted
- Playing career: 2016–present

Career history
- 2016–2017: Ovarense
- 2017–2018: Blu Basket 1971
- 2018: Aris Thessaloniki
- 2018–2019: UJAP Quimper 29
- 2019: Oviedo CB
- 2019–2022: MKS Dąbrowa Górnicza
- 2022: BC Šiauliai
- 2022–2023: Vanoli Cremona
- 2023–2024: Argeș Pitești
- 2024–2025: Arka Gdynia
- 2025–present: BC Pärnu

Bryce Douvier (born 1 December 1991) is an American-Austrian professional basketball player for Pärnu Sadam of the Korvpalli Meistriliiga. He also represented the Austria national team during the 2019 FIBA World Cup qualifiers.
