= Omar Prewitt =

American basketball player

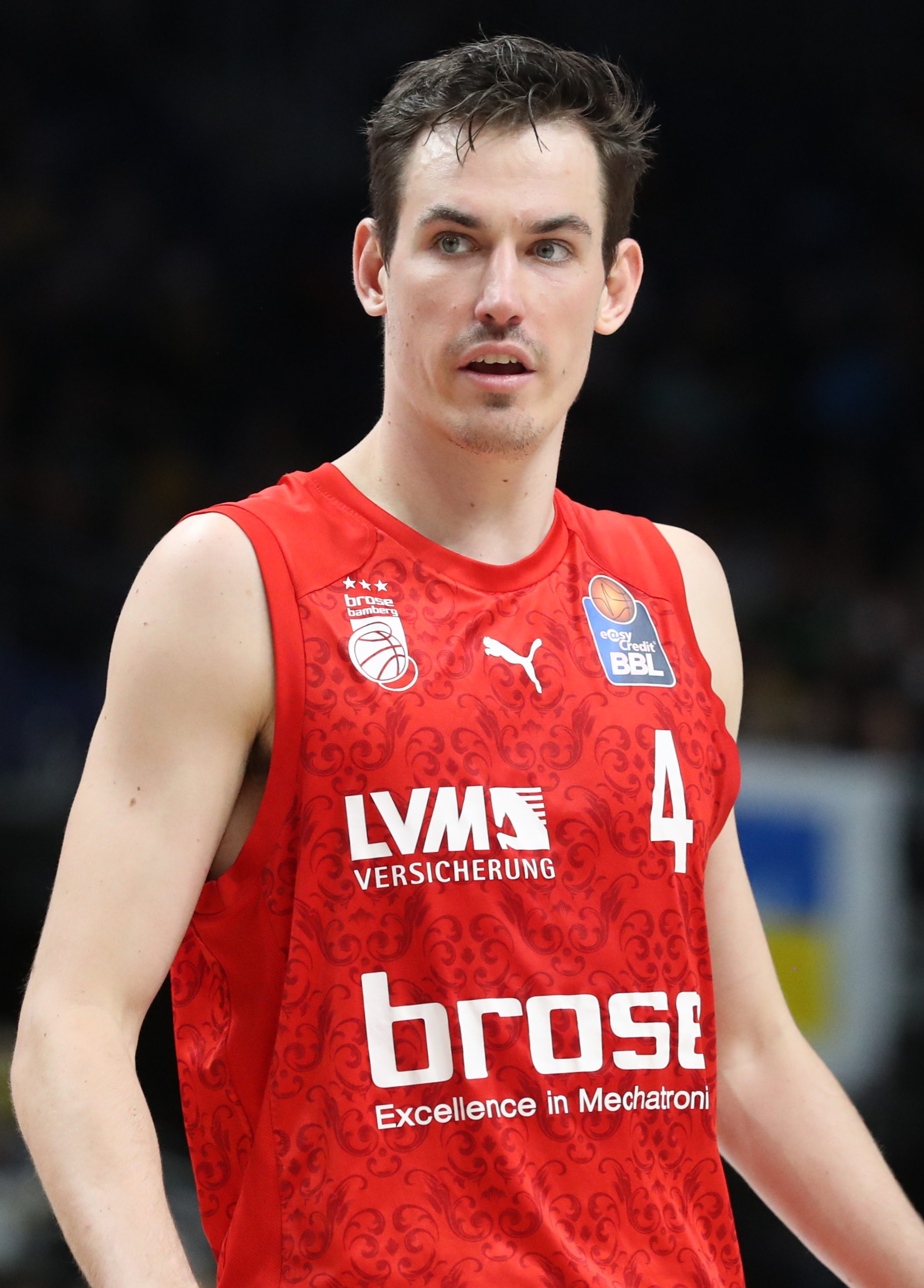

Free Agent
- Position: Small forward

Personal information
- Born: September 24, 1994 (age 32)
- Listed height: 6 ft 7 in (2.01 m)
- Listed weight: 195 lb (88 kg)

Career information
- High school: Montgomery County (Mount Sterling, Kentucky)
- College: William & Mary (2013–2017)
- NBA draft: 2017: undrafted
- Playing career: 2017–present

Career history
- 2017: Šiauliai
- 2017–2018: Aris
- 2018–2019: Warszawa
- 2019–2020: Teksüt Bandırma
- 2020–2021: Nymburk
- 2021–2022: Brose Bamberg
- 2022–2023: Petkim Spor
- 2023–2024: Tofaş

Career highlights
- All-Champions League Second Team (2021); Czech League champion (2021); Czech Cup winner (2021); Second team All-PLK (2019); First-team All-CAA (2016); Second-team All-CAA (2017); Third team All-CAA (2015); CAA Rookie of the Year (2014)

Omar Morgan Prewitt (born September 24, 1994) is an American professional basketball player who last played for Tofaş of the Basketbol Süper Ligi (BSL). He played college basketball at William & Mary.

== Early life and high school ==
Prewitt grew up in Mount Sterling, Kentucky and attended Montgomery County High School. He grew five inches during high school and left Montgomery as the Indians' all-time leader in points (2,636), rebounds (1,071), 3-pointers (347) and blocked shots (210). He averaged 21.4 points per game as a junior and was named second-team All-State by the Lexington Herald-Leader and the Louisville Courier Journal. As a senior, Prewitt averaged 23 points, 8.8 rebounds, 2.3 assists, 2.2 steals and 3.2 blocks and was named first-team All-State as he led Montgomery to the semifinals of the Kentucky State Playoffs. Prewitt committed to play college basketball at William & Mary, the first Division I school to offer him a scholarship, over offers from Drake, Belmont and Louisiana Tech.

== College career ==
Prewitt played four seasons for the William & Mary Tribe, starting his last three seasons. He came exclusively off the bench as a freshman, averaging 11.4 points per game and playing 24.6 minutes per game, and was named the Colonial Athletic Association (CAA) Rookie of the Year. In his first season as a starter, Prewitt averaged 13.5 points and 4.4 rebounds per game per game and was named third team All-CAA. He averaged 17.8 points and 5.2 rebounds as a junior, earning first team All-CAA honors. As a senior, Prewitt was named second team All-CAA after averaging 15.6 points and 6.2 rebounds per game. Prewitt finished his collegiate career fifth in school history with 1,831 points, 11th in assists with 320 and 13th in rebounds with 640.

== Professional career ==
=== Šiauliai ===
Prewitt signed with BC Šiauliai of the Lithuanian Basketball League (LKL) on August 3, 2017. He averaged 8.5 points, 3.2 rebounds and 1.4 assists in 14 LKL games and 9.4 points, 4.6 rebounds and 2.0 assists in eight Baltic Basketball League (BBL) contests before leaving the team in December 2017.

=== Aris ===
Prewitt signed to play with Aris B.C. of the Greek Basket League (GBL) on December 27, 2017, for the remainder of the 2017–2018 season. He averaged 5.5 points and 2.9 rebounds per game in 15 GBL games and 7.6 points, 2.0 rebounds, and 1.4 assists in five Basketball Champions League games.

=== Legia Warszawa ===
Prewitt signed with Legia Warszawa of the Polish Basketball League (PLK) on September 19, 2018. After scoring 33 points the previous week, Prewitt was named the PLK Player of the Week after scoring 32 points with nine rebounds and four assists in a 84–67 win over GTK Gliwice on April 20, 2019, the second-to-last round of the season, to clinch the eighth seed in the PLK Playoffs. Prewitt sustained an injury during the final game of the season that forced him to miss the playoffs as Legia Warszawa fell to top-seeded Asseco Gdynia 3–2 in the opening round. He averaged 18.3 points (3rd in the PLK), 6.1 rebounds, 2.5 assists, and 1.2 steals in 30 PLK games and was named second team All-PLK by the media and first team by EuroBasket.com.

=== Teksüt Bandırma ===
Prewitt signed with Teksüt Bandırma of the Turkish Basketball Super League (BSL) on July 17, 2019. He averaged 12.6 points and 4.5 rebounds in 20 BSL games and 13 points and 2.8 rebounds in 14 Champions League games before the team terminated his contract due to financial reasons.

=== Basketball Nymburk ===
On August 18, 2020, he has signed with ERA Nymburk of the Czech National Basketball League.

=== Brose Bamberg ===
On July 20, 2021, he has signed with Brose Bamberg of the Basketball Bundesliga (BBL).

=== Petkim ===
On July 13, 2022, he has signed with Petkim Spor of the Turkish Basketball Super League.

=== Tofaş ===
On July 10, 2023, he signed with Tofaş of Basketbol Süper Ligi (BSL).

== Personal ==
Prewitt's mother, Lea (née Wise), was an All-Southeastern Conference guard at Kentucky and was the head women's basketball coach at Centre College. Lea Prewitt was inducted into the Kentucky Athletic Hall of Fame in 1999.
