= Brent Petway =

American professional basketball player

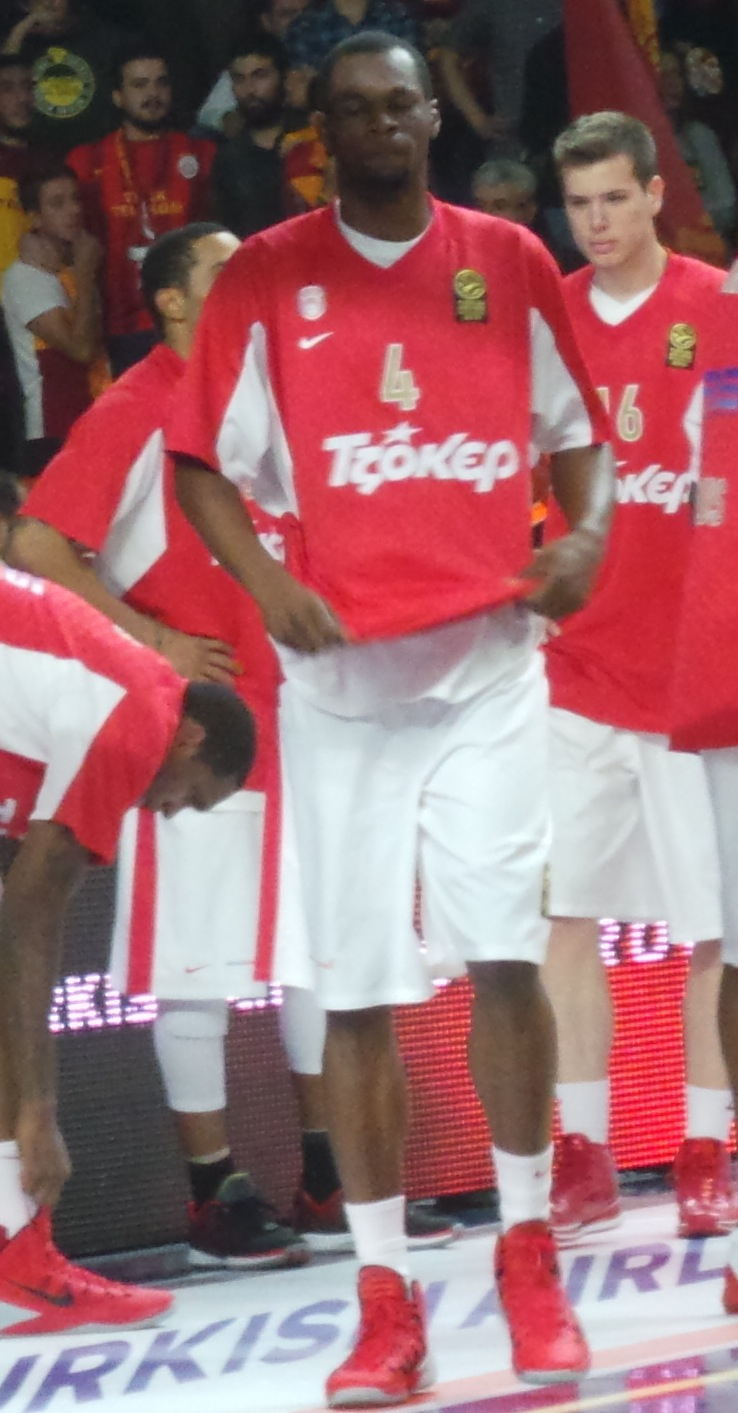
- Petway with Olympiacos in 2013

No. 23 – Rethymno Cretan Kings
- Position: Power forward

Personal information
- Born: May 12, 1985 (age 41) Warner Robins, Georgia, U.S.
- Listed height: 6 ft 8.75 in (2.05 m)
- Listed weight: 225 lb (102 kg)

Career information
- High school: Griffin (Griffin, Georgia)
- College: Michigan (2003–2007)
- NBA draft: 2007: undrafted
- Playing career: 2007–2018

Career history
- 2007–2009: Idaho Stampede
- 2009: Ilysiakos
- 2010: JA Vichy
- 2010–2011: Harlem Globetrotters
- 2011–2013: Rethymno Cretan Kings
- 2013–2015: Olympiacos
- 2015–2016: Dinamo Sassari
- 2016–2017: Pınar Karşıyaka
- 2017: Aris Thessaloniki
- 2018: Tuři Svitavy
- 2025-present: Rethymno Cretan Kings

Career highlights
- FIBA Intercontinental Cup champion (2013); Greek League champion (2015); Greek League Most Spectacular Player (2013); Greek League blocks leader (2013); Greek All-Star (2013); Greek All-Star Game Slam Dunk champ (2013); Greek All-Star Game MVP (2013); NBA D-League champion (2008); D-League All-Star Game Slam Dunk champ (2008); D-League Defensive Player of the Year (2009)

Brent Petway

Personal information
- Nationality: American

Current team
- Team: Panathinaikos eSports
- Game: NBA 2K

Career information
- Playing career: 2020–present

Team history
- 2020–: Panathinaikos eSports

Brenton LaJames "Brent" Petway (born May 12, 1985) is an American basketball player for Rethymno Cretan Kings. Because of his leaping and dunking ability, he has been given the nickname "Air Georgia". This is similar to Vince Carter, who was nicknamed Air Canada, while playing for the Toronto Raptors.

Petway won the inaugural NBA D-League Slam Dunk Contest, at D-League Dream Factory Friday Night, on February 15, during the 2008 NBA All-Star Game Weekend. Petway defeated his Idaho Stampede teammate, Mike Taylor, in the finals, with an alley-oop, through-the-legs dunk. In October 2010, he became a member of the world-famous Harlem Globetrotters, under the name Thunder Petway.

== High school career ==
Petway attended and played high school basketball at Griffin High School for two years, where he won a state championship. He also played at Eagle's Landing High School for one year, and at Union Grove High School for one year.

== College career ==
Petway played college basketball at the University of Michigan with the Michigan Wolverines, from 2003 to 2007.

With Michigan, he won the NIT Tournament championship in 2004. Petway averaged 5.8 points per game during his career at Michigan.

== Professional career ==
Petway participated in training camp with the NBA team the Portland Trail Blazers in the fall of 2007. Petway played in the NBA D-League during the 2007–08 season with the Idaho Stampede, a development team for the Portland Trail Blazers and the Seattle SuperSonics. He played with the 2008 Memphis Grizzlies Summer League team, and then returned to the Stampede for the 2008–09 season.

He played on the Toronto Raptors Summer League team in 2009. He then moved to the Greek League club Ilysiakos. He joined the French League club JA Vichy in 2010. He then moved to the Greek League club Rethymno Aegean.

In June 2013, he joined the Greek EuroLeague team Olympiacos on a two-year deal.

On July 30, 2015, he signed a one-year deal with Dinamo Sassari.

On August 18, 2016, Petway signed a 1+1 contract with Turkish club Pınar Karşıyaka.

On August 17, 2017, Petway signed with Greek club Aris for the 2017–18 season. In December 2017, he parted ways with Aris. On January 15, 2018, he signed with Tuři Svitavy of Czech Republic.

== Esports career ==
On April 2, 2020, Petway signed with Greek e-club Panathinaikos eSports.

== Career statistics ==
Legend
GP	Games played	GS	Games started	MPG	Minutes per game
FG%	Field-goal percentage	3P%	3-point field-goal percentage	FT%	Free-throw percentage
RPG	Rebounds per game	APG	Assists per game	SPG	Steals per game
BPG	Blocks per game	PPG	Points per game	PIR	Performance index rating
**Bold**	Career high

=== EuroLeague ===
Year	Team	GP	GS	MPG	FG%	3P%	FT%	RPG	APG	SPG	BPG	PPG	PIR
2013–14	Olympiacos	**25**	6	19.0	.514	**.438**	.667	3.5	.9	**.4**	**1.0**	**6.2**	6.2
2014–15	Olympiacos	24	**15**	18.2	.421	.329	**.783**	**3.7**	**1.0**	**.4**	.8	5.5	**6.4**
2015–16	Sassari	7	4	**21.0**	**.667**	.214	.667	3.4	.7	.3	.7	4.4	3.0
Career		56	25	18.9	.625	.364	.723	3.6	.9	.4	.9	5.7	6.1

== Awards and accomplishments ==
=== College career ===
- NIT Tournament Champion: (2004)

=== Pro career ===
- NBA D-League All-Star Game Slam Dunk Champ: (2008)
- NBA D-League Champion: (2008)
- NBA D-League Defensive Player of the Year: (2009)
- Greek League All-Star Game: (2013)
- Greek All-Star Game Slam Dunk Champion: (2013)
- Greek League All-Star Game MVP: (2013)
- Greek League Most Spectacular Player: (2013)
- FIBA Intercontinental Cup Champion: (2013)
- Greek League Champion: (2015)
