= Ivan Maraš =

Montenegrin basketball player (born 1986)

Personal information
- Born: 20 April 1986 (age 40) Titograd, SR Montenegro, SFR Yugoslavia
- Listed height: 2.08 m (6 ft 10 in)
- Listed weight: 107 kg (236 lb)

Career information
- NBA draft: 2008: undrafted
- Playing career: 2003–2026
- Position: Power forward / center
- Number: 3

Career history
- 2003–2010: Budućnost Podgorica
- 2010: Metalac Valjevo
- 2010–2011: Hemofarm
- 2011–2012: Dexia Mons-Hainaut
- 2012–2013: ETHA Engomis
- 2013: Ilysiakos
- 2013–2014: Al Manama
- 2014–2016: Tsmoki-Minsk
- 2016: Sanat Naft Abadan
- 2017: Doxa Lefkadas
- 2017: Cholet
- 2018: Aris Thessaloniki
- 2018–2019: Stal Ostrów Wielkopolski
- 2019–2026: Okapi Aalst

Career highlights
- Belarus League and cup winner (2015, 2016); Bahraini League champion (2014) and Best Foreigner of the league; Cypriot Cup MVP (2013); Cypriot Cup winner (2013); 3× Montenegrin League champion (2007–2009); 3× Montenegrin Cup winner (2007–2009); Polish Cup winner (2019)
Medals
Men's basketball
Representing Serbia and Montenegro
U20 European Championship
Gold medal – first place	2006 Turkey	Team
Bronze medal – third place	2005 Russia	Team

Ivan Maraš (Cyrillic: Иван Мараш; born April 20, 1986) is a Montenegrin former professional basketball player who played at the power forward and center positions.

== Professional career ==
Maraš started playing basketball for Budućnost Podgorica of the Montenegrin League from 2003, until 2010. With Budućnost, he won three Montenegrin championships and three Montenegrin cups. Before the end of the 2009–10 season, he also signed with Metalac Valjevo.

Then, Maraš joined Hemofarm, signing a two-year contract with the club. On March 3, 2012, he left Hemofarm and joined the Belgian club Dexia Mons-Hainaut until the end of the season. At the end of the season, he renewed his contract with the club for another season.

In 2012, he signed a contract with the Cypriot team ETHA Engomis. During his season with the club, Maraš won the Cypriot Cup with ETHA and was also the MVP of the tournament. After his great performances with ETHA, Maraš joined Ilysiakos of the Greek Basket League for the rest of the season.

On September 5, 2013, Maraš signed a contract for the upcoming season with the Bahraini team Al Manama. With Al Manama, he won the Bahraini League. For the following two seasons, he played for Tsmoki-Minsk of the Belarus League. During his two-year spell with Tsmoki-Minsk, Maraš also played 3 games for Al Qadsia in Kuwait. With Tsmoki-Minsk, Maraš won two Belarusian championships and two Belarusian cups.

On October 6, 2016, he signed a one-year contract with the Iranian team Sanat Naft Abadan. On February 6, 2017, he signed with Doxa Lefkadas until the end of the season, replacing Melsahn Basabe on the team's squad. On April 20, 2017, he signed with Cholet of the LNB Pro A for the rest of the season. In August 2017, he re-signed with Cholet. On December 30, 2017, he parted ways with Cholet. On January 4, 2018, he signed with Greek club Aris Thessaloniki for the rest of the 2017–18 season.

He signed with Okapi Aalstar on July 4, 2019. He re-signed for two seasons on June 12, 2020. On August 11, 2021, Maraš extended his contract until 2023. On 4 June 2026, the announcement was made that he had played his final game for Okapi Aalst and he would go into retirement.
