= Michalis Tsairelis =

Greek basketball player (born 1988)

No. 6 – Doxa Lefkadas
- Position: Center / power forward
- League: GBL

Personal information
- Born: February 23, 1988 (age 38) Thessaloniki, Greece
- Listed height: 6 ft 10 in (2.08 m)
- Listed weight: 245 lb (111 kg)

Career information
- NBA draft: 2010: undrafted
- Playing career: 2007–present

Career history
- 2007–2008: Aris Thessaloniki
- 2008–2009: AEL
- 2009–2010: Trikala
- 2010–2012: Aris
- 2012–2014: PAOK Thessaloniki
- 2014–2015: Tenerife
- 2015–2016: Olympiacos
- 2016–2018: Aris Thessaloniki
- 2018–2019: Promitheas Patras
- 2019–2020: Ifaistos Limnou
- 2020–2021: Iraklis Thessaloniki
- 2021: Peristeri
- 2021–2022: Larisa
- 2022–2023: Promitheas Patras
- 2023–2024: PAOK Thessaloniki
- 2024–2025: Kolossos Rodou
- 2025–2026: Aris Thessaloniki
- 2026–present: Doxa Lefkadas

Career highlights
- 2× Greek League champion (2015, 2016); 2× Greek All-Star Game (2013, 2014)

Michalis Tsairelis (alternate spellings: Michail, Michailis, Mihalis) (Greek: Μιχάλης Τσαϊρέλης; born February 23, 1988) is a Greek professional basketball player for Doxa Lefkadas of the GBL. Standing at 2.08 m (6 ft 10 in) tall, he plays at the power forward and center positions.

== Professional career ==
After playing with the Apollon Kalamarias in the Greek minors, during the 2006–07 season, Tsairelis began his professional career with Aris, in the Greek Basket League, during the 2007–08 season. He spent the 2008–09 season with AEL 1964, and the 2009–10 season with Trikala 2000. He then returned to Aris for the next two seasons, before joining PAOK in 2012.

He then moved to the Spanish League club Canarias in 2014. He joined the Greek EuroLeague club Olympiacos in February 2015.

On August 5, 2016, Tsairelis signed a two-year contract with Aris. After a very successful 2018-19 campaign with Promitheas Patras, Tsairelis signed a two-year contract with Ifaistos Limnou on July 3, 2019.

On July 28, 2020, Tsairelis moved back to Thessaloniki for Iraklis. On March 11, 2021, he transferred to Peristeri, replacing Ioannis Bourousis.

On August 3, 2021, Tsairelis signed with Larisa. In 35 league games, he averaged 7.4 points, 2.9 rebounds and 1 assist, playing around 21 minutes per contest.

On July 29, 2022, Tsairelis returned to Promitheas Patras. In 24 domestic league matches, he averaged 4.7 points and 2.2 rebounds, playing around 14 minutes per contest.

On June 26, 2023, Tsairelis signed a two-year contract with PAOK, returning to the club after nine seasons.

After spending the 2024–25 campaign with Kolossos Rodou, Tsairelis returned to Aris on November 25, 2025.

== National team career ==
With Greece's junior national teams, Tsairelis played at the 2004 FIBA Europe Under-16 Championship, the 2006 FIBA Europe Under-18 Championship, the 2007 FIBA Europe Under-20 Championship, and the 2008 FIBA Europe Under-20 Championship.

He has also been a member of the senior men's Greek national basketball team. He played at the 2019 FIBA World Cup qualification.

== Awards and accomplishments ==
=== Pro career ===
- Greek Youth All-Star Game MVP: (2010)
- 2× Greek League Senior All-Star: (2013, 2014)
- 2× Greek League champion (2015, 2016)
