= Tyrone Brazelton =

American basketball player (born 1986)

Personal information
- Born: March 30, 1986 (age 40) Chicago, Illinois, U.S.
- Listed height: 6 ft 1 in (1.85 m)
- Listed weight: 172 lb (78 kg)

Career information
- High school: Rich East (Park Forest, Illinois)
- College: Missouri State–West Plains (2004–2006); Western Kentucky (2006–2008)
- NBA draft: 2008: undrafted
- Playing career: 2008–2021
- Position: Point guard
- Number: 3
- Coaching career: 2022–present

Career history

Playing
- 2008: Ventspils
- 2008–2009: Asseco Prokom Gdynia
- 2009–2010: Czarni Słupsk
- 2010–2011: Eisbären Bremerhaven
- 2012: Erie BayHawks
- 2012: Nürnberger
- 2012–2013: Odesa
- 2013: Petrochimi Bandar Imam
- 2013–2014: Nevėžis
- 2014: Tsmoki-Minsk
- 2014: Neptūnas
- 2014–2015: STB Le Havre
- 2015: Torku Konyaspor
- 2015–2016: BCM Gravelines
- 2016–2017: Rosa Radom
- 2017–2018: Istanbulspor Beylikduzu
- 2018: Panionios
- 2018–2019: Ifaistos Limnou
- 2019–2020: Kolossos Rodou
- 2020–2021: Levski Sofia

Coaching
- 2022–2023: Rogers State (assistant)
- 2023–2024: Link Academy (assistant)
- 2024–2025: Gulf Coast State (assistant)
- 2025–present: Howard College (assistant)

Career highlights
- Bulgarian League champion (2021); Polish Supercup winner (2016); Polish Supercup MVP (2016); PLK champion (2009); Second-team All-Sun Belt (2008)

Tyrone Brazelton Jr. (born March 30, 1986) is an American former professional basketball player who is now an assistant coach for the Howard College Hawks. He plays at the point guard position. He won a Polish Championship in 2009 with the club Prokom. On October 2, 2016, Brazelton won the Polish Supercup and was named the MVP.

== College career ==
Born in Chicago, Brazelton initially played basketball for the Rich East High School, but transferred to the rival Rich Central High School during his senior year. He led the latter team to a championship in the Big Dipper tournament and was named as the most valuable player of the tournament.

After graduation, Brazelton played for the Missouri State University-West Plains basketball team, transferring to the Western Kentucky University basketball team his junior year. Missouri State University-West Plains participated in the NJCAA sports and Western Kentucky – in NCAA Division I sports. He led the latter team in double–digit scoring figures during his junior and senior years of college, making the All-Sun Belt Second Team at the end of his senior year.

Brazelton went undrafted at the 2008 NBA draft. He then played with the Utah Jazz's NBA Summer League team, appearing in two games and averaging 12 points, 3 rebounds and 2 assists per game.

== Professional career ==
Failing to impress the NBA scouts, Brazelton moved to Europe and signed with a Latvian team BK Ventspils playing in the EuroChallenge tournament. Although he led the team from the very start, his efforts were not enough to carry the team to the Top 16 phase of the tournament. Shortly after the tournament loss to Cajasol Sevilla, Brazelton moved to Asseco Prokom. Playing in the Euroleague, he averaged 3.7 points, 1.5 rebounds and 1.7 assists per game, shooting 26% from the field. In August 2009, he re-signed with Prokom for one more season. He was released from the team in November 2009.

In January 2011, he moved to Germany and played for Eisbären Bremerhaven.

During the 2011–12 season, Brazelton played in the NBA Development League with Erie BayHawks. He averaged 9.2 points, 2.3 rebounds and 5.3 assists per game, playing 29 minutes a game and shooting 39% from the field.

In August 2012, Brazelton once again moved to Germany and signed with Nürnberger BC. In November, he moved to BC Odesa of Ukraine.

In April 2013, he signed with the Iranian club Petrochimi. In August, he moved to the Lithuanian club BC Nevėžis. In January 2014, he signed with the Belarusian team Tsmoki-Minsk. In April 2014, he returned to Lithuania and signed with BC Neptūnas for the rest of the season.

In August 2014, he signed a one-year deal with STB Le Havre of the French LNB Pro A.

On July 2, 2015, Brazelton signed a two-year deal with Torku Konyaspor of the Turkish Basketball Super League. In December 2015, he parted ways with Konyaspor after averaging 10.7 points and 5 assists per game. On December 19, 2015, he signed with a two-year contract with BCM Gravelines of the LNB Pro A. At the end of the 2015–16 season, he parted ways with Gravelines.

On July 26, 2016, Brazelton signed with Polish club Rosa Radom for the 2016–17 season. On April 18, 2017, he signed Guizhou of China for the 2017 NBL season.

On October 29, 2017, Brazeltone signed with Istanbulspor Beylikduzu of the Turkish Basketball First League.

In February 2018, Brazelton moved to Panionios in Greece and then spent the entire 2018–2019 season with Ifaistos Limnou, averaging 9.2 points, 2.3 rebounds and 4.3 assists in 24 games. On August 5, 2019, Brazelton signed with his third Greek Basket League club, Kolossos Rodou.

=== The Basketball Tournament ===
In 2017, Brazelton played for the Kentucky Kings of The Basketball Tournament. Brazelton scored 6.5 PPG to help his team make it to the second round. The Basketball Tournament is a winner-take-all tournament broadcast on ESPN with a winning purse of $2 million.
