= Dimitris Kaklamanakis =

Greek basketball player

Dimitris Kaklamanakis Δημήτρης Κακλαμανάκης
No. 14 – PAOK Thessaloniki
- Position: Center
- League: Greek Basketball League; EuroCup

Personal information
- Born: 25 January 1994 (age 32) Athens, Greece
- Listed height: 2.06 m (6 ft 9 in)
- Listed weight: 95 kg (209 lb)

Career information
- NBA draft: 2016: undrafted
- Playing career: 2012–present

Career history
- 2012–2013: Milonas
- 2013–2014: Peristeri
- 2014–2015: Ilysiakos
- 2015–2019: Lavrio
- 2019–2020: AEK Athens
- 2020–2021: PAOK Thessaloniki
- 2021–2022: Lavrio
- 2022–2023: Promitheas Patras
- 2023: PAOK Thessaloniki
- 2023–2025: Panionios
- 2025–2026: Peristeri
- 2026–present: PAOK Thessaloniki

Career highlights
- Greek Cup winner (2020); Greek League Most Improved Player (2019); Greek A2 Elite League Top Rebounder (2024); All-Greek A2 Elite League Team (2024)

Dimitris Kaklamanakis (Greek: Δημήτρης Κακλαμανάκης; born 25 January 1994) is a Greek professional basketball player for PAOK Thessaloniki of the Greek Basketball League (GBL) and the EuroCup. He is a 2.06 m tall center.

== Professional career ==
=== Milonas (2012–2013) ===
Kaklamanakis played in amateur leagues with Milonas before beginning his professional career.

=== Peristeri (2013–2014) ===
Kaklamanakis began his professional career with Peristeri during the 2013–14 season.

=== Ilysiakos (2014–2015) ===
During the 2014–15 season, he played for Ilysiakos.

=== Lavrio (2015–2019) ===
In 2015, he signed with Lavrio. During his first season with Lavrio, he was a role player, averaging only four minutes per game.

On 2 July 2016, Kaklamanakis renewed his contract with Lavrio until 2017 and gained a bigger role on the team's squad. At the end of the season, he averaged 4.4 points and 2 rebounds per game.

On 10 July 2017, he renewed his contract with Lavrio for another season.

=== AEK Athens (2019–2020) ===
After four years with Lavrio, on 4 July 2019, Kaklamanakis signed a two-year contract with AEK Athens.

During the 2019–20 season, Kaklamanakis won the Greek Cup with AEK.

=== First stint with PAOK (2020–2021) ===
On 28 July 2020, Kaklamanakis moved to Thessaloniki and joined PAOK for the 2020–21 season.

=== Return to Lavrio (2021–2022) ===
On 5 August 2021, Kaklamanakis returned to Lavrio. In 23 league games, he averaged 9.3 points, 5.3 rebounds, 1.0 assist and 0.7 blocks, playing around 22 minutes per contest.

=== Promitheas Patras (2022–2023) ===
On 21 July 2022, Kaklamanakis signed with Promitheas Patras, following his Lavrio teammate Vassilis Mouratos. In 12 domestic games, he averaged 5.6 points and 3.6 rebounds, playing around 14 minutes per contest.

=== Second stint with PAOK (2023) ===
On 13 January 2023, Kaklamanakis returned to PAOK for the remainder of the 2022–23 season. In 18 league games, he averaged 3.4 points, 4.0 rebounds and 1.0 assist, playing around 14 minutes per contest.

=== Panionios (2023–2025) ===
On 5 July 2023, Kaklamanakis signed with Panionios.

He spent two seasons with Panionios, helping the club return to the Greek Basketball League.

=== Return to Peristeri (2025–2026) ===
On 21 July 2025, Kaklamanakis returned to Peristeri of the Greek Basketball League and the FIBA Europe Cup.

=== Third stint with PAOK (2026–present) ===
On 24 June 2026, Kaklamanakis returned to PAOK Thessaloniki for a third stint with the club, signing a two-year contract through the end of the 2027–28 season. His signing was part of PAOK's roster planning under head coach Andrea Trinchieri, adding experience and depth to the team's Greek frontcourt rotation.

== National team career ==
Kaklamanakis became a member of the senior men's Greek national basketball team in 2019. He played at the 2019 FIBA World Cup qualification.

== Career statistics ==
=== Domestic Leagues ===
==== Regular season ====
Legend
GP	Games played	MPG	Minutes per game	FG%	Field goal percentage
3P%	3-point field goal percentage	FT%	Free throw percentage	RPG	Rebounds per game
APG	Assists per game	SPG	Steals per game	BPG	Blocks per game
PPG	Points per game	**Bold**	Career high		Led the league

Note: Only games in the primary domestic competitions are included. Therefore, games in cup or European competitions are left out.

Year	Team	League	GP	MPG	FG%	3P%	FT%	RPG	APG	SPG	BPG	PPG
2018–19	Lavrio	GBL	26	23.3	.503	-	.580	5.5	.9	.6	.6	8.3
