= Sean Evans (basketball) =

American basketball player (born 1988)

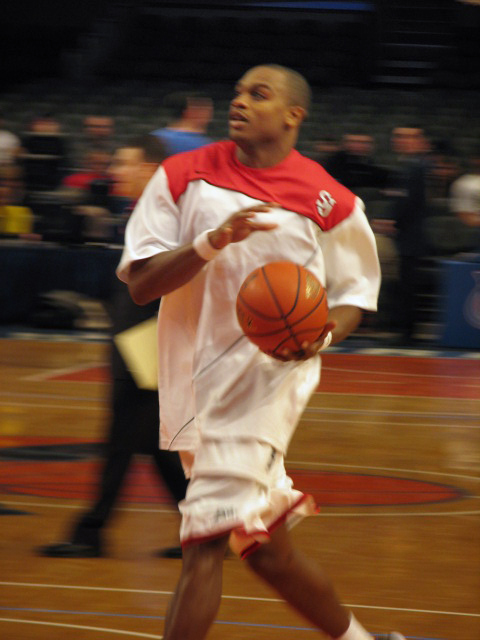
- Evans in 2009

Queens Royals
- Title: Assistant coach
- League: Rocky Mountain Athletic Conference

Personal information
- Born: October 20, 1988 (age 38) Philadelphia, Pennsylvania, US
- Listed height: 6 ft 8 in (2.03 m)
- Listed weight: 230 lb (104 kg)

Career information
- High school: Northeast (Philadelphia, Pennsylvania)
- College: St. John's (2007–2011)
- NBA draft: 2011: undrafted
- Playing career: 2011–2024
- Position: Center / Power forward
- Coaching career: 2024–present

Career history

Playing
- 2011–2012: BG Göttingen
- 2012–2013: Idaho Stampede
- 2013–2014: Anyang KGC
- 2014: Hapoel Eilat
- 2014–2015: Hapoel Holon
- 2015–2016: Sakarya BB
- 2017: Lavrio
- 2017: Promitheas Patras
- 2018: Boca Juniors
- 2018: Rabotnički
- 2018–2020: Ifaistos Limnou
- 2020–2021: Lavrio
- 2021–2022: BC Prometey
- 2022: ratiopharm Ulm
- 2022–2023: Ironi Ramat Gan
- 2023: Karditsa
- 2023: Mersin BB
- 2023–2024: Dinamo București

Coaching
- 2024–2025: Colorado Mesa (Assistant)
- 2025–present: Queens Royals (Assistant)

Career highlights
- Greek League rebounding leader (2020); Macedonian League champion (2018); TBSL rebounding leader (2016); KBL Defensive Player of the Year (2014)

Sean Evans (born October 20, 1988) is an American professional basketball player, who last played for Dinamo București of the Romanian League. Standing at 2.03 m (6 ft 8 in), he plays at the power forward and center positions. After playing four years of college basketball at St. John's, Evans entered the 2011 NBA draft, but he was not selected in the draft's two rounds.

== High school career ==
Evans played high school basketball at Northeast, where he was coached by Bill Lawson. Evans led his squad to an 18–8 record as a senior, averaging 22.0 points per game, 13.0 rebounds, 6.0 steals and 3.5 blocked shots per game for the Vikings. He earned a second team all-city honor. Evans also earned the Sonny Hill Award for registering the highest student-athlete GPA at Northeast.

== College career ==
As a freshman Evans played 30 games, producing 3.1 points and 2.5 rebounds per game with a total of 8 blocks. As a sophomore Evans played in 34 contests, improving his numbers a lot, averaging 10.3 points, 7.1 rebounds and 0.3 blocks per game, being the best rebounder of the team. During the next two years, his numbers dropped and did not manage to be a star at his team.

== Professional career ==
After going undrafted in the 2011 NBA draft, Evans joined Düsseldorf Giants of the 2. Bundesliga. However, he left the team before appearing in a single game in order to join BG Göttingen of the German Bundesliga.

The following season, Evans entered the 2012 NBA Development League Draft, being chosen by the Idaho Stampede in the 5th round with the 3rd pick. Later, he signed with Idaho. He went on to average 12.2 points and 8.4 rebounds per game.

In July 2013, he signed with Anyang KGC of the Korean Basketball League. In May 2014, he joined Indios de San Francisco of the Dominican Republic League, but he left the club without making any appearances with the team.

On July 23, 2014, Evans signed with Hapoel Eilat of the Israeli Super League. He left the team on December in order to join Hapoel Holon, replacing Laurence Bowers on the team's squad.

On August 29, 2015, he signed with Sakarya Büyükşehir Belediyesi of the Turkish Basketball First League. He was the top rebounder of the league, averaging 11.1 per game.

On January 15, 2017, he signed with Lavrio of the Greek Basket League, replacing Jito Kok on the team's squad. On March 14, 2017, he was voted as the Stoiximan.gr MVP of the week along with Vassilis Kavvadas after having 15 points, 9 rebounds, 2 assists and 1 block against Koroivos Amaliadas.

On June 14, 2017, Evans signed with Promitheas Patras of the Greek Basket League. He left Promitheas after appearing in nine games. On January 26, 2018, he signed in Argentina with Boca Juniors of the Liga Nacional de Básquet.

He signed with Ifaistos Limnou of the Greek Basket League on July 18, 2018. On August 11, 2019, Evans renewed his contract with the Greek club. He averaged 10.6 points and 9.2 rebounds per game during the 2019–20 season. On November 11, 2020, Evans returned to Lavrio after three seasons. On January 9, 2021, Evans transferred from Lavrio to Ukrainian club BC Prometey.

On March 14, 2022, he signed with ratiopharm Ulm of the German Basketball Bundesliga.

After a stint in Israel, Evans spent the latter half of the 2022–2023 with another Greek club, Karditsa. In 9 league games, he averaged 12.9 points and 8.5 rebounds, playing around 29 minutes per contest. In April 2023, he finished out the season with the Turkish club Mersin.

== The Basketball Tournament (TBT) ==
In the summer of 2017, Evans competed in The Basketball Tournament on ESPN for Team FOE, a Philadelphia based team coached by NBA forwards Markieff and Marcus Morris. In four games, Evans averaged 10.3 points and 7.5 rebounds per game on 56% shooting as Team FOE advanced to the Super 16 Round in Brooklyn, New York. During FOE's Super 16 match up against Boeheim's Army, a team composed of Syracuse University basketball alum, Evans scored six points and grabbed eight rebounds, but it was not enough as FOE lost 72–67. Evans also competed for FOE in 2016 as well. In three games that summer, he averaged 14.3 points and 10.3 rebounds per game.
