= Sofia Befon Palaio Faliro Indoor Hall =

Indoor sporting arena in Athens, Greece

Coordinates: 37°55′58″N 23°41′21″E

Sofia Befon Indoor Hall
- Interactive map of Sofia Befon Indoor Hall
- Full name: Sofia Befon Palaio Faliro Indoor Hall
- Location: Palaio Faliro, Greece
- Capacity: Basketball: 1,204; Volleyball: 1,204
- Surface: Parquet

Construction
- Opened: 2017

Tenants
- Palaio Faliro (2017–present); Panionios (2019–2021); Ionikos Nikaias (2019–2020)

Sofia Befon Palaio Faliro Indoor Hall (alternate spelling: Sophia Mpefon) (Greek: Κλειστό Γυμναστήριο Σοφία Μπεφόν), is an indoor sporting arena that is located in Palaio Faliro, a suburban town in the Athens agglomeration, Greece. The arena is named in honor of Sofia Befon. It is mainly used to host gymnastics, and basketball, volleyball, and handball games. The seating capacity of the arena is 772 people in the permanent upper tier, and 1,204 people with the retractable seats in the lower tier.

== History ==
Sofia Befon Indoor Hall opened in 2017. It has been used as the home arena of the Greek professional basketball clubs Palaio Faliro, Panionios, and Ionikos Nikaias.
