= 2015–16 AEK B.C. season =

AEK
2015–16 season
- Chairman: (Greece) Makis Angelopoulos
- Head coach: (Greece) Dragan Šakota (1–10) (Slovenia) Jure Zdovc (11–26)
- Arena: Olympic Indoor Hall
- Greek Basket League: 3rd
- Greek Cup: Quarterfinalists
- EuroCup: Regular season
| Home | Away | Alternate |

The 2015–16 AEK B.C. season was AEK's 59th season in the top-tier level Greek Basket League. AEK played in three different competitions during the season.

== Transfers 2015–16 ==
=== Players in ===
| No. | Pos. | Nat. | Name | Age | Moving from | | Type | Ends | Transfer fee | Date | Source |
|---|---|---|---|---|---|---|---|---|---|---|---|
| 13 | SG | (United States) | T. J. Carter | 30 | PAOK | (Greece) | End of contract | 1 year | Free | June 23, 2015 | |
| | PG | (Greece) | Nikos Diplaros | 18 | Esperos Patras | (Greece) | Transfer | 5 years | €25,000 | June 29, 2015 | |
| 31 | G/F | (Greece) | Nick Paulos | 23 | UNC Greensboro Spartans | (United States) | End of NCAA eligibility | 2 years | Free | July 10, 2015 | |
| 21 | PG | (Greece) | Dimitrios Moraitis | 16 | Panionios | (Greece) | Transfer | 6 years | €1,200,000 | July 20, 2015 | |
| 3 | PF | (Greece) | Nikos Kamarianos | 18 | Panathinaikos | (Greece) | From the youth squad | 5 years | Free | July 21, 2015 | |
| 11 | SG | (Canada) | Philip Scrubb | 22 | Carleton | (Canada) | End of CIS eligibility | 2 years | Free | August 3, 2015 | |
| 19 | PG | (Greece) | Dimitrios Katsivelis | 23 | Olympiacos | (Greece) | End of contract | 2 years | Free | August 5, 2015 | |
| 69 | PG | (United States) | Chris Warren | 26 | Uşak Sportif | (Turkey) | End of contract | 1 year | Free | August 8, 2015 | |
| 12 | C | (Greece) | Loukas Mavrokefalidis | 31 | Panathinaikos | (Greece) | End of contract | 1+1 years | Free | August 10, 2015 | |
| 33 | C | (United States) | Daniel Orton | 25 | Idaho Stampede | (United States) | End of contract | 1 year | Free | August 16, 2015 | |
| 34 | PF | (Greece) | Georgios Tsalmpouris | 19 | Iowa State Cyclones | (United States) | Early departure from NCAA | 5 years | €50,000 | August 29, 2015 | |
| 6 | G/F | (Bosnia and Herzegovina) | Edin Atić | 18 | Spars Sarajevo | (Bosnia and Herzegovina) | Transfer | 6 years | €750,000 | September 1, 2015 | |
| 20 | G/F | (Greece) | Giannis Kalampokis | 37 | Rethymno Cretan Kings | (Greece) | End of contract | 1 year | Free | October 2, 2015 | |
| 1 | C | (United States) | O. D. Anosike | 24 | Laboral Kutxa Baskonia | (Spain) | Termination of contract | 1 year | – | October 7, 2015 | |
| 22 | C | (Greece) | Dimitrios Mavroeidis | 30 | Nea Kifissia | (Greece) | Transfer | 1 year | TBD | November 9, 2015 | |
| 0 | PG | (United States) | Malcolm Armstead | 26 | Avtodor Saratov | (Russia) | Transfer | 1+1 years | TBD | November 16, 2015 | |
| 2 | PG | (United States) | D. J. Cooper | 25 | Krasny Oktyabr | (Russia) | Transfer | 2 years | TBD | November 21, 2015 | |
| 25 | SG | (United States) | Dionte Christmas | 29 | Hapoel Holon | (Israel) | End of contract | 1 month | Free | January 8, 2016 | |
| 14 | G | (United States) | J'Covan Brown | 25 | Türk Telekom | (Turkey) | Termination of contract | 6 months+1 year | Free | January 27, 2016 | |
| 9 | PG | (Georgia (country)) | Taurean Green | 29 | Sidigas Avellino | (Italy) | Termination of contract | 5 months | Free | February 17, 2016 | |
| 50 | C | (Nigeria) | Micheal Eric | 27 | Texas Legends | (United States) | Transfer | 2 months | €40,000 | April 8, 2016 | |

Total spending: ▼€2,065,000+

=== Players out ===
| No. | Pos. | Nat. | Name | Age | Moving to | | Type | Transfer fee | Date | Source |
|---|---|---|---|---|---|---|---|---|---|---|
| 8 | SG | (Greece) | Michalis Polytarchou | 32 | Peristeri | (Greece) | Expired contract | Free | June 2, 2015 | |
| 21 | C | (United Kingdom) | Pops Mensah-Bonsu | 31 | City of Gods | (United States) | Expired contract | Free | July 1, 2015 | |
| 7 | SF | (Greece) | Leonidas Kaselakis | 25 | Nea Kifissia | (Greece) | Expired contract | Free | July 1, 2015 | |
| 14 | C | (Greece) | Georgios Tsiakos | 33 | Panionios | (Greece) | Expired contract | Free | July 1, 2015 | |
| 23 | SG | (Canada) | Carl English | 34 | Free agent | | Expired contract | Free | July 1, 2015 | |
| 3 | PG | (United States) | Scottie Wilbekin | 22 | Philadelphia 76ers | (United States) | Expired contract | Free | July 1, 2015 | |
| 5 | PG | (Lithuania) | Tomas Delininkaitis | 33 | Free agent | | Expired contract | Free | July 1, 2015 | |
| 17 | PG | (Greece) | Ioannis Athinaiou | 27 | Olympiacos | (Greece) | Expired contract | Free | July 10, 2015 | |
| | PF | (Greece) | Michalis Kamperidis | 21 | Rethymno Cretan Kings | (Greece) | Loan | – | July 29, 2015 | |
| | PG | (Greece) | Nikos Diplaros | 18 | Aris | (Greece) | Terminate contract | Free | August 14, 2015 | |
| 33 | C | (United States) | Daniel Orton | 25 | Santa Cruz Warriors | (United States) | Terminate contract | Free | October 3, 2015 | |
| 31 | G/F | (Greece) | Nick Paulos | 23 | Doukas | (Greece) | Loan | – | November 3, 2015 | |
| 69 | PG | (United States) | Chris Warren | 27 | Akın Çorap Yeşilgiresun | (Turkey) | Terminate contract | Free | November 27, 2015 | |
| 1 | C | (Nigeria) | O. D. Anosike | 24 | Enel Brindisi | (Italy) | Terminate contract | – | November 27, 2015 | |
| 0 | PG | (United States) | Malcolm Armstead | 26 | İstanbul BB | (Turkey) | Terminate contract | – | December 25, 2015 | |
| 11 | G | (Canada) | Philip Scrubb | 23 | Skyliners Frankfurt | (Germany) | Loan | – | January 7, 2016 | |
| 2 | PG | (United States) | D. J. Cooper | 25 | AS Monaco | (France) | Transfer | €80,000 | January 25, 2016 | |
| 6 | G/F | (Bosnia and Herzegovina) | Edin Atić | 19 | Spars Sarajevo | (Bosnia and Herzegovina) | Loan | – | January 29, 2016 | |
| 25 | SG | (United States) | Dionte Christmas | 29 | Free agent | | Expired contract | Free | February 8, 2016 | |
| 9 | PG | (Georgia (country)) | Taurean Green | 29 | Free agent | | Terminate contract | Free | May 10, 2016 | |

Total income: ▲€80,000

Total expenditure: ▼€1,985,000+

== Pre-season and friendlies ==
Win Loss

| September 9, 2015 1 | Dinamo Sassari (Italy) | 78–72 | (Greece) AEK | Nuoro |
| 21:30 (EEST) | Scoring by quarter: 23-20, 11-19, 19-21, 25-12 |
| | Pts: Logan 20; Rebs: Logan, Alexander 4 Asts: Haynes 8 | | Pts: Orton 16; Rebs: Šakota 8 Asts: Šakota 5 | Referees: Biggi, Begnis, Ranaudo |

| September 12, 2015 2 | Dinamo Sassari (Italy) | 73–74 | (Greece) AEK | Sassari |
| 21:30 (EEST) | Scoring by quarter: 17-24 , 27-18, 13-18, 16-14 |
| | Pts: Petway, Alexander 13; Rebs: Varnado 6 Asts: Haynes, Alexander 3 | | Pts: Mavrokefalidis 18; Rebs: Katsivelis 8 Asts: Katsivelis 4 | Arena: Palasport Roberta Serradimigni; Referees: Martolini, Borgioni, Calbucci |

| September 19, 2015 3 | AEK (Greece) | 88–82 | (Greece) Nea Kifissia | Athens |
| 14:00 (EEST) | Scoring by quarter: 32-23, 16-20, 24-24, 16-15 |
| | Pts: Orton 25 | | Pts: Kaselakis 21 | Arena: Olympic Sports Center Athens; Referees: Godas, Magklogiannis |

| September 21, 2015 4 | AEK (Greece) | 90–57 | (Greece) Lavrio | Athens |
| 18:00 (EEST) | Scoring by quarter: 21-15, 29-17, 22-13, 18-12 |
| | Pts: Šakota 29 | | Pts: Young 18 | Arena: Olympic Sports Center Athens; Referees: Koromilas, Bikas |

| September 25, 2015 5 | AEK (Greece) | 89–88 | (Greece) Rethymno Cretan Kings | Chania |
| 19:30 (EEST) | Scoring by quarter: 25-25, 10-20, 24-25, 30-18 |
| OTE Sport | Pts: Šakota 27 | | Pts: Kloof 19 | Arena: Nea Chora (Kladisos Area); Referees: Panagiotou, Magklogiannis, Chalabalakis |

| September 26, 2015 6 | AEK (Greece) | 63–80 | (Germany) Skyliners Frankfurt | Chania |
| 19:30 (EEST) | Scoring by quarter: 12-22, 20-17, 14-18, 17-23 |
| OTE Sport | Pts: Carter 10 | | Pts: Dimša 16 | Arena: Nea Chora (Kladisos Area); Referees: Panagiotou, Magklogiannis, Katrachouras |

| September 29, 2015 7 | AEK (Greece) | 85–56 | (Turkey) Anadolu Efes | Athens |
| 19:00 (EEST) | Scoring by quarter: 23-12, 23-13, 15-24, 24-7 |
| OTE Sport | Pts: Mavrokefalidis 20 | | Pts: Šarić 12 | Arena: Olympic Sports Center Athens; Referees: Anastopoulos, Somos, Psarianos |

| October 3, 2015 8 | AEK (Greece) | 93–70 | (Greece) Apollon Patras | Athens |
| 14:00 (EEST) | Scoring by quarter: 21-21, 23-18, 16-11, 33-20 |
| | Pts: Warren 19 | | Pts: Pahlmblad 17 | Arena: Olympic Sports Center Athens; Referees: Schinas, Diamantis |

== Competitions ==
=== Overall ===
| Competition | Started round | Current position / round | Final position / round | First match | Last match |
|---|---|---|---|---|---|
| Greek Basket League | Matchday 1 | — | 3rd / Finals | 10 October 2015 | 28 May 2016 |
| Greek Cup | Quarterfinals | — | Quarterfinalists | 7 October 2015 | 7 October 2015 |
| EuroCup | Matchday 1 | — | 5th / Regular season | 14 October 2015 | 16 December 2015 |

Updated to match played June 8, 2019
Source: Competitions

=== Overview ===
| Competition | Record | | | | | | | |
| Competition | Pld | W | D | L | PF | PA | PD | Win % |
|---|---|---|---|---|---|---|---|---|
| Greek Basket League | 36 | 23 | 0 | 13 | 2,741 | 2,598 | +143 | 63.89 |
| Greek Cup | 1 | 0 | 0 | 1 | 61 | 64 | −3 | 0.00 |
| EuroCup | 10 | 5 | 0 | 5 | 794 | 812 | −18 | 50.00 |
| Total | 47 | 28 | 0 | 19 | 3,596 | 3,474 | +122 | 59.57 |

Last updated: June 8, 2019
Source: Competitions

=== Greek Basket League ===
==== League table ====
| Pos | Team | Pld | W | L | PF | PA | PD | Pts | Qualification or relegation |
|---|---|---|---|---|---|---|---|---|---|
| 1 | Olympiacos | 26 | 25 | 1 | 2235 | 1688 | +547 | 51 | Qualification to Playoffs |
| 2 | Panathinaikos | 26 | 25 | 1 | 2135 | 1770 | +365 | 51 | Qualification to Playoffs |
| 3 | Aris | 26 | 20 | 6 | 2010 | 1761 | +249 | 46 | Qualification to Playoffs |
| 4 | AEK | 26 | 18 | 8 | 2010 | 1834 | +176 | 44 | Qualification to Playoffs |
| 5 | PAOK | 26 | 13 | 13 | 1956 | 1924 | +32 | 39 | Qualification to Playoffs |
| 6 | Nea Kifissia | 26 | 12 | 14 | 1964 | 1998 | −34 | 38 | Qualification to Playoffs |
| 7 | Kolossos H Hotels | 26 | 11 | 15 | 1918 | 1990 | −72 | 37 | Qualification to Playoffs |
| 8 | Rethymno Cretan Kings | 26 | 10 | 16 | 1953 | 2098 | −145 | 36 | Qualification to Playoffs |
| 9 | Trikala Aries | 26 | 9 | 17 | 1938 | 2061 | −123 | 35 | |
| 10 | Apollon Patras Carna | 26 | 9 | 17 | 1797 | 1952 | −155 | 35 | |
| 11 | Lavrio | 26 | 9 | 17 | 1895 | 2027 | −132 | 35 | |
| 12 | Koroivos | 26 | 8 | 18 | 1809 | 1991 | −182 | 34 | |
| 13 | Arkadikos | 26 | 8 | 18 | 1785 | 2032 | −247 | 34 | Relegated to Greek A2 Basket League |
| 14 | Kavala | 26 | 5 | 21 | 1830 | 2109 | −279 | 31 | Relegated to Greek A2 Basket League |

Source: ESAKE

Updated to match(es) played on 9 April 2016.

==== Regular season ====
Win Loss

| 10 October 2015 1 | AEK (Greece) | 65–53 | (Greece) PAOK | Marousi |
| 18:00 (EEST) | Scoring by quarter: 15-12, 21-18, 12-15, 17-8 |
| OTE Sport | Pts: Mavrokefalidis 18; Rebs: Mavrokefalidis 12; Asts: Papantoniou 5 PIR: Milošević, Mavrokefalidis 24 | Boxscore | Pts: Vasileiadis 22; Rebs: Vasileiadis, Kakaroudis, Marković 6 Asts: Tsochlas 4 PIR: Vasileiadis 20 | Arena: Olympic Sports Center Athens; Referees: Koromilas, Psarianos, Deslis |

| 18 October 2015 2 | Lavrio (Greece) | 65–70 | (Greece) AEK | Lavrio |
| 17:00 (EEST) | Scoring by quarter: 21-22, 13-14, 15-22, 16-12 |
| Nova Sports | Pts: Young 22; Rebs: Krubally 12; Asts: Young 4 PIR: Krubally 28 | Boxscore | Pts: Hairston 13; Rebs: Milošević 9 Asts: Warren 6 PIR: Hairston 19 | Arena: Lavrio Indoor Hall; Referees: Christodoulou, Mitsopoulos, Xenikakis |

| 24 October 2015 3 | AEK (Greece) | 82–65 | (Greece) Trikala | Marousi |
| 17:00 (EEST) | Scoring by quarter: 20-23, 24-11, 22-16, 16-15 |
| OTE Sport | Pts: Mavrokefalidis 26; Rebs: Milošević 11; Asts: Warren 14; PIR: Mavrokefalidis 33 | Boxscore | Pts: Conger 22; Rebs: Soko 8 Asts: Robinson, Conger, Teague 3 PIR: Conger 25 | Arena: Olympic Sports Center Athens; Referees: Godas, Poursanidis, Katrachouras |

| 31 October 2015 4 | Koroivos (Greece) | 67–76 | (Greece) AEK | Amaliada |
| 17:00 (EEST) | Scoring by quarter: 24-11, 14-24, 8-21, 21-20 |
| Nova Sports | Pts: Davis 24; Rebs: Thornton 12; Asts: Vasilopoulos, Council 3 PIR: Davis 27 | Boxscore | Pts: Mavrokefalidis 28; Rebs: Milošević 9 Asts: Hairston 7 PIR: Mavrokefalidis 37 | Arena: Amaliada Indoor Hall; Referees: Schinas, Stamatopoulos, Andrikopoulos |

| 7 November 2015 5 | AEK (Greece) | 80–72 | (Greece) Kavala | Marousi |
| 16:30 (EEST) | Scoring by quarter: 28-21, 17-21, 19-14, 16-16 |
| OTE Sport | Pts: Hairston 16; Rebs: Mavrokefalidis 11; Asts: Hairston, Papantoniou, Carter 3 PIR: Hairston 21 | Boxscore | Pts: Jones 22; Rebs: Jones, Kostov 5 Asts: Robinson 6 PIR: Kostov 23 | Arena: Olympic Sports Center Athens; Referees: Kaldiris, Pafilis, Pagonis |

| 14 November 2015 6 | AEK (Greece) | 84–78 | (Greece) Apollon Patras | Marousi |
| 19:00 (EEST) | Scoring by quarter: 18-21, 27-22, 20-16, 19-19 |
| OTE Sport | Pts: Mavrokefalidis 16; Rebs: Mavrokefalidis 8 Asts: Papantoniou 4 PIR: Mavrokefalidis 23 | Boxscore | Pts: Meier 20; Rebs: Woods 10; Asts: Duncan 9 PIR: Meier 21 | Arena: Olympic Sports Center Athens; Referees: Poursanidis, Stamatopoulos, Simeonidis |

| 21 November 2015 7 | Nea Kifissia (Greece) | 54–78 | (Greece) AEK | Kifisia |
| 17:00 (EEST) | Scoring by quarter: 8-21, 19-18, 18-18, 9-21 |
| Nova Sports | Pts: Hogue 12; Rebs: Kaselakis, Hogue 6 Asts: Gikas 4 PIR: Hogue 14 | Boxscore | Pts: Milošević 20; Rebs: Milošević 10; Asts: Scrubb 5 PIR: Milošević 23 | Arena: Zirineio Indoor Hall; Referees: Godas, Panagiotou, Bikas |

| 28 November 2015 8 | AEK (Greece) | 74–83 | (Greece) Aris | Marousi |
| 17:00 (EEST) | Scoring by quarter: 20-22, 16-19, 17-27, 21-15 |
| OTE Sport | Pts: Carter 13; Rebs: Mavroeidis 7 Asts: Cooper 6 PIR: Mavroeidis 21 | Boxscore | Pts: White 20; Rebs: White 7 Asts: McNeal 3 PIR: White 25 | Arena: Olympic Sports Center Athens; Referees: Piloidis, Anastopoulos, Tzafleris |

| 6 December 2015 9 | Olympiacos (Greece) | 79–71 | (Greece) AEK | Piraeus |
| 19:00 (EEST) | Scoring by quarter: 17-9, 24-23, 18-11, 20-28 |
| OTE Sport | Pts: Mantzaris 17; Rebs: Strawberry 8 Asts: Mantzaris 6 PIR: Mantzaris 22 | Boxscore | Pts: Mavrokefalidis 25; Rebs: Mavrokefalidis 9 Asts: Carter 4 PIR: Mavrokefalidis 24 | Arena: Peace and Friendship Stadium; Referees: Christodoulou, Koromilas, Theonas |

| 19 December 2015 10 | AEK (Greece) | 86–70 | (Greece) Rethymno Cretan Kings | Marousi |
| 17:00 (EEST) | Scoring by quarter: 23-11, 26-21, 20-20, 17-18 |
| OTE Sport | Pts: Mavrokefalidis 19; Rebs: Mavrokefalidis 8 Asts: Cooper 11; PIR: Mavrokefalidis 24 | Boxscore | Pts: Kloof 25; Rebs: Giannopoulos 7 Asts: Stone 2 PIR: Kloof 30 | Arena: Olympic Sports Center Athens; Referees: Karakatsounis, Manos, Skoutas |

| 23 December 2015 11 | Kolossos (Greece) | 85–86(OT) | (Greece) AEK | Rhodes |
| 16:15 (EEST) | Scoring by quarter: 11-15, 20-18, 28-24, 13-15, Overtime: 13-14 |
| Nova Sports | Pts: Releford 26; Rebs: Larentzakis 7 Asts: Releford 3 PIR: Releford 30 | Boxscore | Pts: Cooper 20; Rebs: Cooper 9 Asts: Cooper 11; PIR: Cooper 31 | Arena: Venetokleio Indoor Hall; Referees: Anastopoulos, Papapetrou, Goumas |

| 3 January 2016 12 | AEK (Greece) | 64–67 | (Greece) Panathinaikos | Marousi |
| 18:00 (EEST) | Scoring by quarter: 18-17, 19-20, 13-12, 14-18 |
| OTE Sport | Pts: Mavrokefalidis 17; Rebs: Cooper 8 Asts: Cooper 8 PIR: Mavrokefalidis 17 | Boxscore | Pts: Feldeine 15; Rebs: Gist 4 Asts: Calathes 9 PIR: Calathes 17 | Arena: Olympic Sports Center Athens; Referees: Christodoulou, Karakatsounis, Mitsopoulos |

| 9 January 2016 13 | Arkadikos (Greece) | 74–78 | (Greece) AEK | Tripoli |
| 17:00 (EEST) | Scoring by quarter: 20-26, 21-14, 9-18, 24-20 |
| Nova Sports | Pts: van Oostrum 21; Rebs: Kavvadas 10; Asts: van Oostrum 4 PIR: van Oostrum 27 | Boxscore | Pts: Mavrokefalidis 20; Rebs: Mavrokefalidis 7 Asts: Cooper, Šakota 4 PIR: Mavrokefalidis 27 | Arena: Tripoli Indoor Hall; Referees: Anastopoulos, Bitis, Georgiadis |

| 16 January 2016 14 | PAOK (Greece) | 79–75 | (Greece) AEK | Thessaloniki |
| 16:30 (EEST) | Scoring by quarter: 13-25, 20-21, 26-14, 20-15 |
| Nova Sports | Pts: Hatcher, Vasileiadis 19; Rebs: Vasileiadis 8 Asts: Hatcher 5 PIR: Vasileiadis 23 | Boxscore | Pts: Šakota 15; Rebs: Mavroeidis 10; Asts: Cooper 4 PIR: Mavroeidis, Šakota 16 | Arena: P.A.O.K. Sports Arena; Referees: Koromilas, Manos, Pafilis |

| 23 January 2016 15 | AEK (Greece) | 90–82 | (Greece) Lavrio | Marousi |
| 17:00 (EEST) | Scoring by quarter: 26-16, 18-20, 19-23, 27-23 |
| OTE Sport | Pts: Mavroeidis 21; Rebs: Mavrokefalidis 10; Asts: Cooper 5 PIR: Mavroeidis 31 | Boxscore | Pts: Young 26; Rebs: Barlos 6 Asts: Nixon, Giannakopoulos 3 PIR: Young 18 | Arena: Olympic Sports Center Athens; Referees: Somos, Georgiadis, Simeonidis |

| 30 January 2016 16 | Trikala (Greece) | 65–70 | (Greece) AEK | Trikala |
| 17:00 (EEST) | Scoring by quarter: 19-23, 18-15, 10-14, 18-18 |
| Nova Sports | Pts: Brown 21; Rebs: Conger 11; Asts: Cadougan 2 PIR: Conger 31 | Boxscore | Pts: Mavrokefalidis 18; Rebs: Mavrokefalidis 9 Asts: Mavrokefalidis 5 PIR: Mavrokefalidis 25 | Arena: Trikala Indoor Hall; Referees: Anastopoulos, Psarianos, Vardalos |

| 6 February 2016 17 | AEK (Greece) | 70–49 | (Greece) Koroivos | Marousi |
| 16:30 (EEST) | Scoring by quarter: 22-11, 22-17, 16-7, 10-14 |
| OTE Sport | Pts: Mavroeidis 16; Rebs: Mavroeidis 8 Asts: Brown 7 PIR: Mavroeidis 32 | Boxscore | Pts: Harding, Poulianitis 9 Rebs: Slaftsakis 8 Asts: Trotter, Slaftsakis 3 PIR: Slaftsakis, Poulianitis 10 | Arena: Olympic Sports Center Athens; Referees: Schinas, Bitis, Karavitis |

| 13 February 2016 18 | Kavala (Greece) | 55–65 | (Greece) AEK | Kavala |
| 17:00 (EEST) | Scoring by quarter: 15-21, 14-11, 11-18, 15-15 |
| Nova Sports | Pts: Williams 18; Rebs: Williams 20; Asts: Giannakidis, McKie 2 PIR: Williams 31 | Boxscore | Pts: Hairston 15; Rebs: Milošević 11; Asts: Kalampokis 4 PIR: Milošević 18 | Arena: Kalamitsa Indoor Hall; Referees: Koromilas, Andrikopoulos, Tzafleris |

| 18 February 2016 19 | Apollon Patras (Greece) | 63–82 | (Greece) AEK | Patras |
| 19:00 (EEST) | Scoring by quarter: 15-22, 10-25, 12-16, 26-19 |
| Nova Sports | Pts: Lampropoulos 14; Rebs: Verginis 5 Asts: Verginis 5 PIR: Lampropoulos 20 | Boxscore | Pts: Mavrokefalidis 14; Rebs: Milošević, Hairston, Carter 5 Asts: Brown 5 PIR: Hairston 18 | Arena: Apollon Patras Indoor Hall; Referees: Anastopoulos, Tsonos, Bikas |

| 21 February 2016 20 | AEK (Greece) | 76–73 | (Greece) Nea Kifissia | Marousi |
| 17:00 (EEST) | Scoring by quarter: 12-21, 24-18, 27-7, 13-27 |
| OTE Sport | Pts: Kalampokis 13; Rebs: Mavrokefalidis 9 Asts: Brown 4 PIR: Kalampokis 15 | Boxscore | Pts: Hogue 19; Rebs: Hogue 14; Asts: Gikas 8 PIR: Hogue 34 | Arena: Olympic Sports Center Athens; Referees: Foufis, Panagiotou, Georgiadis |

| 28 February 2016 21 | Aris (Greece) | 77–76 | (Greece) AEK | Thessaloniki |
| 17:00 (EEST) | Scoring by quarter: 16-18, 21-29, 13-13, 27-16 |
| Nova Sports | Pts: Pelekanos 15; Rebs: Cohen 7 Asts: McNeal 5 PIR: Pelekanos 17 | Boxscore | Pts: Brown 14; Rebs: Mavroeidis 8 Asts: Mavrokefalidis, Hairston, Šakota, Green, Brown, Carter 1 PIR: Milošević 12 | Arena: Nick Galis Hall; Referees: Koromilas, Karakatsounis, Bitis |

| 13 March 2016 22 | AEK (Greece) | 93–100(OT) | (Greece) Olympiacos | Marousi |
| 17:00 (EEST) | Scoring by quarter: 22-21, 20-18, 19-23, 16-15, Overtime: 10-10 |
| OTE Sport | Pts: Brown 24; Rebs: Mavrokefalidis 16; Asts: Mavrokefalidis 6 PIR: Mavrokefalidis 29 | Boxscore | Pts: Spanoulis 26; Rebs: Hunter 7 Asts: Spanoulis 9 PIR: Spanoulis 26 | Arena: Olympic Sports Center Athens; Referees: Godas, Anastopoulos, Psarianos |

| 19 March 2016 23 | Rethymno Cretan Kings (Greece) | 70–69 | (Greece) AEK | Rethymno |
| 17:00 (EEST) | Scoring by quarter: 13-22, 20-17, 19-20, 18-10 |
| Nova Sports | Pts: Madden 16; Rebs: Madden 8 Asts: Madden 6 PIR: Madden 25 | Boxscore | Pts: Mavrokefalidis 20; Rebs: Mavrokefalidis 9 Asts: Mavrokefalidis 6 PIR: Mavrokefalidis 23 | Arena: Melina Merkouri Indoor Hall; Referees: Foufis, Somos, Simeonidis |

| 26 March 2016 24 | AEK (Greece) | 92–57 | (Greece) Kolossos | Marousi |
| 17:00 (EEST) | Scoring by quarter: 28-14, 17-14, 16-11, 31-18 |
| OTE Sport | Pts: Kalampokis 17; Rebs: Milošević 6 Asts: Green 6 PIR: Milošević 23 | Boxscore | Pts: Davis II 14; Rebs: Davis II, Saloustros 6 Asts: Larentzakis, Releford 4 PIR: Davis II 17 | Arena: Olympic Sports Center Athens; Referees: Papapetrou, Goumas, Tsounas |

| 4 April 2016 25 | Panathinaikos (Greece) | 78–71 | (Greece) AEK | Marousi |
| 20:00 (EEST) | Scoring by quarter: 23-15, 18-17, 16-24, 21-15 |
| Nova Sports | Pts: Williams 24; Rebs: Raduljica 5 Asts: Calathes 6 PIR: Williams 29 | Boxscore | Pts: Mavrokefalidis 16; Rebs: Mavrokefalidis 8 Asts: Green 3 PIR: Mavrokefalidis 15 | Arena: Olympic Sports Center Athens; Referees: Anastopoulos, Karakatsounis, Andrikopoulos |

| 9 April 2016 26 | AEK (Greece) | 87–74 | (Greece) Arkadikos | Marousi |
| 17:00 (EEST) | Scoring by quarter: 19-20, 17-20, 26-17, 25-17 |
| OTE Sport | Pts: Carter 24; Rebs: Carter 5 Asts: Papantoniou 6 PIR: Carter 29 | Boxscore | Pts: Kavvadas 18; Rebs: Kavvadas, van Oostrum 5 Asts: Lee 5 PIR: Kavvadas 16 | Arena: Olympic Sports Center Athens; Referees: Manos, Katrachouras, Kodilis |

==== Results overview ====
Win Loss

| Opposition | Home score | Away score | Double |
|---|---|---|---|
| Apollon Patras | 84–78 | 63–82 | 166–141 |
| Aris | 74–83 | 77–76 | 150–160 |
| Arkadikos | 87–74 | 74–78 | 165–148 |
| Kavala | 80–72 | 55–65 | 145–127 |
| Kolossos | 92–57 | 85–86 | 178–142 |
| Koroivos | 70–49 | 67–76 | 146–116 |
| Lavrio | 90–82 | 65–70 | 160–147 |
| Nea Kifissia | 76–73 | 54–78 | 154–127 |
| Olympiacos | 93–100 | 79–71 | 164–179 |
| Panathinaikos | 64–67 | 78–71 | 135–145 |
| PAOK | 65–53 | 79–75 | 140–132 |
| Rethymno Cretan Kings | 86–70 | 70–69 | 155–140 |
| Trikala | 82–65 | 65–70 | 152–130 |

==== Quarterfinals ====
Win Loss

| 16 April 2016 1st Round | AEK (Greece) | 78–83 | (Greece) PAOK | Marousi |
| 18:30 (EEST) | Scoring by quarter: 24-16, 17-17, 20-19, 17-31 |
| OTE Sport | Pts: Mavrokefalidis 19; Rebs: Mavroeidis 10; Asts: Brown 6 PIR: Mavrokefalidis, Brown 13 | Boxscore | Pts: Hatcher 21; Rebs: Margaritis, Clanton 6 Asts: Duvnjak, Tepić 4 PIR: Hatcher 24 | Arena: Olympic Sports Center Athens; Referees: Godas, Foufis, Psarianos |

| 23 April 2016 2nd Round | PAOK (Greece) | 59–68 | (Greece) AEK | Thessaloniki |
| 20:00 (EEST) | Scoring by quarter: 21-17, 12-29, 9-7, 17-15 |
| Nova Sports | Pts: Vasileiadis 12; Rebs: Clanton 8 Asts: Vasileiadis 6 PIR: Clanton 14 | Boxscore | Pts: Milošević 17; Rebs: Mavrokefalidis 12; Asts: Brown 4 PIR: Milošević 25 | Arena: P.A.O.K. Sports Arena; Referees: Piloidis, Mitsopoulos, Maglogiannis |

| 27 April 2016 3rd Round | AEK (Greece) | 61–54 | (Greece) PAOK | Marousi |
| 18:45 (EEST) | Scoring by quarter: 14-13, 15-14, 16-12, 16-15 |
| OTE Sport | Pts: Mavroeidis 10; Rebs: Mavroeidis 11; Asts: Brown 3 PIR: Mavroeidis 15 | Boxscore | Pts: Tepić 22; Rebs: Clanton 7 Asts: Hatcher 9 PIR: Tepić 26 | Arena: Olympic Sports Center Athens; Referees: Koromilas, Karakatsounis, Stamatopoulos |

==== Semifinals ====
Win Loss

| 4 May 2016 1st Round | Olympiacos (Greece) | 93–58 | (Greece) AEK | Piraeus |
| 18:00 (EEST) | Scoring by quarter: 21-14, 31-16, 18-18, 23-10 |
| OTE Sport | Pts: Spanoulis 15; Rebs: Papanikolaou, Mantzaris 5 Asts: Spanoulis 6 PIR: Spanoulis 18 | Boxscore | Pts: Mavroeidis 15; Rebs: Hairston 6 Asts: Mavrokefalidis 4 PIR: Mavroeidis 20 | Arena: Peace and Friendship Stadium; Referees: Koromilas, Karakatsounis, Psarianos |

| 6 May 2016 2nd Round | Olympiacos (Greece) | 80–67 | (Greece) AEK | Piraeus |
| 20:00 (EEST) | Scoring by quarter: 23-22, 21-7, 17-16, 19-22 |
| OTE Sport | Pts: Lojeski 17; Rebs: Warrick 7 Asts: Spanoulis 9 PIR: Lojeski 23 | Boxscore | Pts: Mavroeidis 16; Rebs: Mavroeidis 10; Asts: Milošević 4 PIR: Mavroeidis 24 | Arena: Peace and Friendship Stadium; Referees: Piloidis, Poursanidis, Stamatopoulos |

| 10 May 2016 3rd Round | AEK (Greece) | 75–89 | (Greece) Olympiacos | Marousi |
| 19:00 (EEST) | Scoring by quarter: 21-18, 20-13, 20-24, 14-34 |
| OTE Sport | Pts: Brown 17; Rebs: Mavroeidis, Milošević 6 Asts: Brown 5 PIR: Brown 19 | Boxscore | Pts: Hackett 18; Rebs: Hunter 7 Asts: Hackett 5 PIR: Hackett 22 | Arena: Olympic Sports Center Athens; Referees: Anastopoulos, Foufis, Goumas |

==== Third place ====
Win Loss

| 18 May 2016 1st Round | Aris (Greece) | 67–77 | (Greece) AEK | Thessaloniki |
| 19:00 (EEST) | Scoring by quarter: 23-13, 20-15, 14-22, 10-27 |
| Nova Sports | Pts: White 15; Rebs: White 8 Asts: Waters 4 PIR: White 18 | Boxscore | Pts: Brown 20; Rebs: Milošević 9 Asts: Brown 4 PIR: Milošević 19 | Arena: Nick Galis Hall; Referees: Piloidis, Karakatsounis, Somos |

| 21 May 2016 2nd Round | AEK (Greece) | 89–84 | (Greece) Aris | Marousi |
| 19:00 (EEST) | Scoring by quarter: 24-14, 24-21, 20-26, 21-23 |
| OTE Sport | Pts: Šakota 22; Rebs: Carter 7 Asts: Brown 5 PIR: Šakota 26 | Boxscore | Pts: Zaras 22; Rebs: White 7 Asts: Waters 7 PIR: White 24 | Arena: Olympic Sports Center Athens; Referees: Godas, Foufis, Bitis |

| 25 May 2016 3rd Round | Aris (Greece) | 74–69 | (Greece) AEK | Thessaloniki |
| 19:00 (EEST) | Scoring by quarter: 16-18, 14-18, 19-18, 25-15 |
| Nova Sports | Pts: Symtsak 22; Rebs: Symtsak 10; Asts: McNeal 8 PIR: Symtsak 25 | Boxscore | Pts: Carter 18; Rebs: Milošević 13; Asts: Hairston, Milošević 3 PIR: Hairston 24 | Arena: Nick Galis Hall; Referees: Christodoulou, Schinas, Stamatopoulos |

| 28 May 2016 4th Round | AEK (Greece) | 89–81 | (Greece) Aris | Marousi |
| 19:00 (EEST) | Scoring by quarter: 22-18, 21-21, 30-25, 16-17 |
| OTE Sport | Pts: Hairston 24; Rebs: Milošević, Mavroeidis 8 Asts: Hairston 5 PIR: Hairston 34 | Boxscore | Pts: Waters 17; Rebs: White 7 Asts: Xanthopoulos 4 PIR: White 18 | Arena: Olympic Sports Center Athens; Referees: Piloidis, Karakatsounis, Papapetrou |

=== Greek Cup ===
==== Quarterfinals ====
| October 7, 2015 Quarterfinals | Aris (Greece) | 64–61 | (Greece) AEK | Thessaloniki |
| 19:30 (EEST) | Scoring by quarter: 18-21, 18-15, 15-11, 13-14 |
| Nova Sports | Pts: Hagins 17 | | Pts: Mavrokefalidis 13 | Arena: Nick Galis Hall; Referees: Christodoulou, Piloidis, Panagiotou |

=== EuroCup ===
==== Regular season - Group F ====
| Pos | Team | Pld | W | L | PF | PA | PD | Qualification |
|---|---|---|---|---|---|---|---|---|
| 1 | (Turkey) Galatasaray Odeabank | 10 | 7 | 3 | 867 | 789 | +78 | Advance to Last 32 |
| 2 | (Lithuania) Neptūnas | 10 | 6 | 4 | 829 | 807 | +22 | Advance to Last 32 |
| 3 | (Russia) Nizhny Novgorod | 10 | 6 | 4 | 801 | 780 | +21 | Advance to Last 32 |
| 4 | (Israel) Hapoel Jerusalem | 10 | 5 | 5 | 808 | 798 | +10 | Advance to Last 32 |
| 5 | (Greece) AEK | 10 | 5 | 5 | 794 | 812 | −18 | |
| 6 | (Russia) Krasny Oktyabr | 10 | 1 | 9 | 797 | 910 | −113 | |

Source: Eurocup Basketball

==== Results summary ====
| Overall | | | | | | Home | | | | | Away | | | | |
| Pld | W | L | PF | PA | PD | W | L | PF | PA | PD | W | L | PF | PA | PD |
|---|---|---|---|---|---|---|---|---|---|---|---|---|---|---|---|
| 10 | 5 | 5 | 794 | 812 | −18 | 3 | 2 | 404 | 397 | +7 | 2 | 3 | 390 | 415 | −25 |

Last updated: June 8, 2019.
Source: Euro Cup Group F Results

==== Regular season ====
Win Loss

| 14 October 2015 1 | AEK (Greece) | 94–96(OT) | (Russia) Krasny Oktyabr | Marousi |
| 19:00 (EEST) | Scoring by quarter: 14-18, 23-25, 23-25, 26-18, Overtime: 8-10 |
| OTE Sport | Pts: Mavrokefalidis 42; Rebs: Mavrokefalidis 9 Asts: Carter 6 PIR: Mavrokefalidis 55 | Boxscore | Pts: Mitchell 39; Rebs: Mitchell 8 Asts: Cooper 14; PIR: Mitchell 34 | Arena: Olympic Sports Center Athens; Referees: Conde (ESP), Ciulin (ROU), Bijedic (BIH) |

| 21 October 2015 2 | Galatasaray Odeabank (Turkey) | 89–65 | (Greece) AEK | Istanbul |
| 18:30 (EEST) | Scoring by quarter: 22-11, 26-16, 16-10, 25-28 |
| OTE Sport | Pts: McCollum 25; Rebs: Dorsey 12; Asts: McCollum 6 PIR: McCollum 26 | Boxscore | Pts: Mavrokefalidis, Šakota 20; Rebs: Mavrokefalidis 10; Asts: Papantoniou 5 PIR: Mavrokefalidis 22 | Arena: Abdi İpekçi Arena; Referees: Shulga (UKR), Vojinovic (MNE), Balak (ISR) |

| 28 October 2015 3 | AEK (Greece) | 87–70 | (Russia) Nizhny Novgorod | Marousi |
| 19:00 (EEST) | Scoring by quarter: 24-26, 23-20, 19-14, 21-10 |
| OTE Sport | Pts: Mavrokefalidis 19; Rebs: Mavrokefalidis 13; Asts: Papantoniou, Warren 3 PIR: Mavrokefalidis 30 | Boxscore | Pts: Grigoryev, Strebkov 13; Rebs: Ivlev 8 Asts: Khvostov 5 PIR: Khvostov 17 | Arena: Olympic Sports Center Athens; Referees: Lanzarini (ITA), Reiter (GER), Lopes (POR) |

| 4 November 2015 4 | AEK (Greece) | 75–74 | (Israel) Hapoel Jerusalem | Marousi |
| 19:00 (EEST) | Scoring by quarter: 16-25, 12-20, 26-14, 21-15 |
| OTE Sport | Pts: Warren 16; Rebs: Mavrokefalidis 8 Asts: Warren 9 PIR: Warren 21 | Boxscore | Pts: Janning 23; Rebs: Smith 10; Asts: Smith 7 PIR: Janning 22 | Arena: Olympic Sports Center Athens; Referees: Garcia Gonzalez (ESP), Petek (SVN), Halliko (EST) |

| 11 November 2015 5 | Neptūnas (Lithuania) | 80–86 | (Greece) AEK | Klaipėda |
| 19:00 (EEST) | Scoring by quarter: 22-17, 21-24, 18-17, 19-28 |
| OTE Sport | Pts: Mažeika 20; Rebs: Grant 6 Asts: Ewing 6 PIR: Mažeika 20 | Boxscore | Pts: Mavrokefalidis 27; Rebs: Mavrokefalidis 8 Asts: Hairston 5 PIR: Mavrokefalidis 38 | Arena: Švyturio Arena; Referees: Perea (ESP), Fritz (GER), Ovinov (RUS) |

| 18 November 2015 6 | Krasny Oktyabr (Russia) | 78–82(OT) | (Greece) AEK | Moscow |
| 18:30 (EEST) | Scoring by quarter: 22-14, 11-20, 15-23, 22-13, Overtime: 8-12 |
| OTE Sport | Pts: Cooper 27; Rebs: Cooper 11; Asts: Cooper 8 PIR: Cooper 42 | Boxscore | Pts: Mavrokefalidis 28; Rebs: Mavrokefalidis 10; Asts: Papantoniou, Mavrokefalidis 4 PIR: Mavrokefalidis 36 | Arena: Krylatskoe Sport Palace; Referees: Herceg (CRO), Kowalski (POL), Rodsand (NOR) |

| 25 November 2015 7 | AEK (Greece) | 73–86 | (Turkey) Galatasaray Odeabank | Marousi |
| 19:00 (EEST) | Scoring by quarter: 15-23, 22-23, 21-17, 15-23 |
| OTE Sport | Pts: Mavrokefalidis 26; Rebs: Mavrokefalidis 11; Asts: Warren 5 PIR: Mavrokefalidis 38 | Boxscore | Pts: McCollum 24; Rebs: Dorsey 9 Asts: Micov 5 PIR: McCollum 22 | Arena: Olympic Sports Center Athens; Referees: Lamonica (ITA), Shulga (UKR), Koljensic (MNE) |

| 1 December 2015 8 | Nizhny Novgorod (Russia) | 86–79 | (Greece) AEK | Nizhny Novgorod |
| 18:30 (EEST) | Scoring by quarter: 19-25, 25-27, 19-11, 23-16 |
| OTE Sport | Pts: Rudd 21; Rebs: Bērziņš 13; Asts: Khvostov 10; PIR: Rudd, Khvostov, Bērziņš 19 | Boxscore | Pts: Mavroeidis 26; Rebs: Mavroeidis 10; Asts: Katsivelis 6 PIR: Mavroeidis 36 | Arena: Cec Nagorny; Referees: Laurinavicius (LTU), Romano (ISR), Obrknezevic (SRB) |

| 9 December 2015 9 | Hapoel Jerusalem (Israel) | 82–78 | (Greece) AEK | Jerusalem |
| 19:00 (EEST) | Scoring by quarter: 31-20, 12-17, 18-18, 21-23 |
| OTE Sport | Pts: Eliyahu 22; Rebs: Smith 9 Asts: Rowland 7 PIR: Eliyahu 31 | Boxscore | Pts: Mavrokefalidis 16; Rebs: Mavrokefalidis 9 Asts: Mavrokefalidis, Katsivelis 6 PIR: Mavrokefalidis 15 | Arena: Pais Arena Jerusalem; Referees: Dozai (CRO), Silva (POR), Vojinovic (MNE) |

| 16 December 2015 10 | AEK (Greece) | 75–71 | (Lithuania) Neptūnas | Marousi |
| 19:00 (EEST) | Scoring by quarter: 22-19, 11-15, 20-26, 22-11 |
| OTE Sport | Pts: Mavrokefalidis 27; Rebs: Mavrokefalidis 9 Asts: Papantoniou 4 PIR: Mavrokefalidis 28 | Boxscore | Pts: Ewing 22; Rebs: Butkevičius 7 Asts: Ewing 9 PIR: Ewing 18 | Arena: Olympic Sports Center Athens; Referees: Biricik (TUR), Reiter (GER), Putenko (RUS) |

==== Results overview ====
Win Loss

| Opposition | Home score | Away score | Double |
|---|---|---|---|
| (Russia) Krasny Oktyabr | 94–96 | 78–82 | 176–174 |
| (Turkey) Galatasaray Odeabank | 73–86 | 89–65 | 138–175 |
| (Russia) Nizhny Novgorod | 87–70 | 86–79 | 166–156 |
| (Lithuania) Neptūnas | 75–71 | 80–86 | 161–151 |
| (Israel) Hapoel Jerusalem | 75–74 | 82–78 | 153–156 |
