= 2014–15 AEK B.C. season =

AEK
2014–15 season
- Chairman: (Greece) Alexandros Alexiou
- Head coach: (Greece) Vangelis Ziagkos (1-6) (Greece) (Serbia) Dragan Šakota (7-26)
- Arena: Olympic Indoor Hall
- Greek Basket League: 5th
- Greek Cup: Third Round
Home	Away	Anniversary

In the 2014–15 AEK B.C. season, AEK returned to the top-tier level Greek Basket League, after an absence in the league of three years.

During the season, the team didn't begin well, and had to make changes to its initial roster. After a few weeks, Dragan Šakota took over as the team's new head coach, and notable new players came to AEK, such as Pops Mensah-Bonsu, Malik Hairston, and others. Another important change of the club for the season was the change of the club's owner. Makis Angelopoulos became the club's new owner. At the end of the season, AEK finished in 5th place in the Greek Basket League's regular season, and was defeated by Aris in the Greek Basket League's playoffs.

== Transfers 2014–2015 ==
=== In ===
Pos.	Name	From
Point guard	(United States) Cashmere Wright	(Netherlands) GasTerra Flames
Shooting guard	(United States) David Kyles	(Greece) Panelefsiniakos
Center	(United States) Vernon Goodridge	(Spain) Bàsquet Manresa
Small forward	(United States) Garrett Williamson	(Canada) London Lightning
Shooting guard	(Canada) Carl English	(Spain) 1939 Gran Canarias
Power forward	(Greece) Dušan Šakota	(Italy) Pallacanestro Varese
Small forward	(Bosnia and Herzegovina) Milan Milošević	(Slovenia) Zlatorog Laško
Point guard	(Lithuania) Tomas Delininkaitis	(Turkey) Torku Konyaspor
Small forward	(United States) Malik Hairston	(Turkey) Galatasaray Liv Hospital
Center	(United Kingdom) Pops Mensah-Bonsu	(Israel) Hapoel Jerusalem
Power forward	(Greece) Michalis Kamperidis	(Greece) Filathlitikos
Center	(Greece) Zisis Sarikopoulos	(Greece) Aris
Small forward	(Greece) Leonidas Kaselakis	(Greece) PAOK
Point guard	(Greece) Nondas Papantoniou	(Greece) Kolossos
Point guard	(Greece) Ioannis Athinaiou	(Turkey) Eskişehir Basket

=== Out ===
Pos.	Name	To
Point guard	(Greece) Spyros Panagiotaras	(Greece) Peristeri
Small forward	(Greece) Vangelis Karampoulas	(Greece) Kavala
Power forward	(Greece) Andronikos Gizogiannis	(Greece) Ethnikos
Shooting guard	(Greece) Thodoris Tsiotras	(Greece) Ethnikos
Center	(Greece) Dimitris Despos	(Greece) Iraklis
Small forward	(Greece) Konstantinos Papantonakos	(Greece) Pagrati
Power forward	(Greece) Giannis Stoukas	(Greece) Maroussi
Power forward	(Greece) Vangelis Drosos	(Greece) Ilysiakos
Center	(Greece) Nikos Zeginoglou	Free Agent
Point guard	(Greece) Alexis Falekas	Retired
Center	(United States) Vernon Goodridge	Free Agent
Point guard	(United States) Cashmere Wright	Free Agent
Shooting guard	(United States) David Kyles	Free Agent
Point guard	(Serbia) Stefan Nikolić	Free Agent

== Competitions ==
=== Overall ===
Competition	Started round	Current position / round	Final position / round	First match	Last match
Greek League	Matchday 1	—	5th	12 October 2014	19 May 2015
Greek Cup	First round	—	Third Round	24 September 2014	7 October 2014

Updated to match played June 9, 2019
Source: Competitions

=== Overview ===
Competition	Record							
Competition	Pld	W	D	L	PF	PA	PD	Win %
Greek League	29	16	0	13	2,284	2,194	+90	55.17
Greek Cup	3	2	0	1	222	220	+2	66.67
Total	32	18	0	14	2,506	2,414	+92	56.25

Last updated: June 9, 2019
Source: Competitions

==== Results summary ====
Overall						Home					Away				
Pld	W	L	PF	PA	PD	W	L	PF	PA	PD	W	L	PF	PA	PD
26	15	11	2084	1965	+119	10	3	1090	971	+119	5	8	994	994	0

Last updated: June 9, 2019.
Source: Competitive matches

==== Results by round ====
Round	1	2	3	4	5	6	7	8	9	10	11	12	13	14	15	16	17	18	19	20	21	22	23	24	25	26
Ground	A	H	A	H	A	H	A	H	A	A	H	A	H	H	A	H	A	H	A	H	A	H	H	A	H	A
Result	L	W	L	L	L	W	W	W	L	L	W	L	W	W	W	L	L	W	W	W	W	W	W	L	L	W
Position	12	10	9	10	12	11	7	7	7	7	6	7	6	5	5	5	7	5	5	5	5	5	4	5	5	5

Source: Competitive matches
A = Away; H = Home; W = Win; D = Draw; L = Loss

=== Greek League ===
==== League table ====
Pos	Team	Pld	W	L	PF	PA	PD	Pts	Qualification or relegation
3	PAOK	26	19	7	1911	1802	+109	45	Qualification to Playoffs
4	Aris	26	16	10	1886	1847	+39	42	Qualification to Playoffs
5	AEK	26	15	11	2084	1965	+119	41	Qualification to Playoffs
6	Rethymno Aegean	26	14	12	1926	1931	−5	40	Qualification to Playoffs
7	Kolossos Rodou	26	13	13	1893	1956	−63	39	Qualification to Playoffs

==== Regular season ====
Win Loss

October 12, 2014 1	Koroivos	80–67	AEK

October 19, 2014 2	AEK	77–64	Panionios

October 26, 2014 3	Panathinaikos	92–58	AEK

November 3, 2014 4	AEK	62–81	Olympiacos

November 8, 2014 5	Panelefsiniakos	81–72	AEK

November 16, 2014 6	AEK	67–64	Apollon Patras

November 22, 2014 7	Kifissia	75–80	AEK

November 30, 2014 8	AEK	96–73	Kolossos Rhodes

December 6, 2014 9	Aris	86–75	AEK

December 6, 2014 10	Trikala	87–83	AEK

December 28, 2014 11	AEK	85–77	Rethymno

January 11, 2015 12	PAOK	73–71	AEK

January 18, 2015 13	AEK	89–79	KAOD

January 24, 2015 14	AEK	76–67	Koroivos

February 07, 2015 15	Panionios	78–94	AEK

February 19, 2015 16	AEK	62–70	Panathinaikos

February 19, 2015 17	Olympiacos	83–77	AEK

March 1, 2015 18	AEK	105–80	Panelefsiniakos

March 07, 2015 19	Apollon Patras	48–89	AEK

March 15, 2015 20	AEK	97–73	Kifissia

March 21, 2015 21	Kolossos Rhodes	65–72	AEK

March 29, 2015 22	AEK	93–77	Aris

April 18, 2015 23	AEK	96–73	Trikala

April 25, 2015 24	Rethymno	80–79	AEK

May 6, 2015 25	AEK	85–93	PAOK

May 09, 2015 26	KAOD	66–77	AEK

==== Results overview ====
Win Loss

Opposition	Home score	Away score	Double
Aris	93-77	86-75	168-163
KAOD	89-79	66-77	166-145
Kolossos Rhodes	96-73	65-72	168-138
Trikala	96-73	87-83	179-160
Apollon Patras	67-64	48-89	156-112
Koroivos	76-67	80-67	143-147
Olympiacos	62-81	83-77	139-164
Panathinaikos	62-70	92-58	120-162
Panionios	77-64	78-94	171-142
PAOK	85-93	73-71	156-166
Kifissia	97-73	75-80	177-148
Rethymno	85-77	80-79	164-157
Panelefsiniakos	105-80	81-72	177-161

==== Quarterfinals ====
May 13, 2015 1st Round	Aris	71–69	AEK

May 16, 2015 2nd Round	AEK	92–54	Aris

May 19, 2015 3rd Round	Aris	79–68	AEK

=== Greek Cup ===
==== Playoffs Qualification ====
Source: ESAKE

September 24, 2014 1st round	AEK	84–79	Kolossos Rhodes

September 28, 2014 2nd round	AEK	81–78	Rethymno

October 7, 2014 3rd round	Aris	63–57	AEK
