= Eurocup Basketball 2011–12 Regular Season Group B =

Standings and Results for Group B of the Regular Season phase of the 2011–12 Eurocup basketball tournament.

== Standings ==
Key to colors
Top two teams advance to Last 16

	Team	Pld	W	L	PF	PA	Diff
1.	(Russia) Khimki	6	6	0	480	398	+82
2.	(Latvia) VEF Rīga	6	3	3	436	444	−8
3.	(France) Cholet Basket	6	2	4	389	428	−39
4.	(Greece) P.A.O.K.	6	1	5	417	452	−35

== Fixtures and results ==
All times given below are in Central European Time.

=== Game 1 ===
15 November 2011
18:30

Report

VEF Rīga (Latvia)	80–74	(Greece) P.A.O.K.
Scoring by quarter: 23–23, 22–21, 20–13, 15–17
Pts: Sims 19; Rebs: Sims 11; Asts: Valters 3		Pts: Giddens 17; Rebs: Giddens 6 Asts: Wright 3

Arena Riga, Riga
Attendance: 2,700
Referees: Robert Vyklicky (CZE), Sergiy Chebyshev (UKR), Aare Halliko (EST)

15 November 2011
20:30

Report

Cholet Basket (France)	63–75	(Russia) Khimki
Scoring by quarter: 16–20, 18–15, 11–28, 18–12
Pts: Causeur 31; Rebs: three players 6 Asts: Battle 3		Pts: Mozgov 21; Rebs: Monia 8 Asts: Planinić 8

La Meilleraie, Cholet
Attendance: 4,550
Referees: Zoran Sutulovic (MNE), Renaud Geller (BEL), Gianluca Mattioli (ITA)

=== Game 2 ===
22 November 2011
16:00

Report

Khimki (Russia)	90–70	(Latvia) VEF Rīga
Scoring by quarter: 26–20, 25–24, 21–12, 18–14
Pts: Fridzon, Lončar 11; Rebs: Nielsen 9 Asts: Monia 5		Pts: Sims 18; Rebs: Cain 10; Asts: Janičenoks, Cain 4

Basketball Center of Moscow Region, Khimki
Attendance: 2,500
Referees: Sasa Pukl (SLO), Miroslav Tomov (BUL), Igor Dragojevic (MNE)

22 November 2011
18:45

Report

P.A.O.K. (Greece)	74–62	(France) Cholet Basket
Scoring by quarter: 18–15, 18–18, 20–13, 18–16
Pts: Giddens 22; Rebs: Giddens 12; Asts: Stiggers, Dikoudis 6		Pts: Causeur 22; Rebs: Gobert 12; Asts: McGrath 3

P.A.O.K. Sports Arena, Thessaloniki
Attendance: 1,611
Referees: Ilija Belošević (SRB), Dragan Nešković (SRB), Moritz Reiter (GER)

=== Game 3 ===
29 November 2011
18:30

Report

VEF Rīga (Latvia)	69–53	(France) Cholet Basket
Scoring by quarter: 24–18, 8–18, 22–10, 15–7
Pts: Sims 14; Rebs: Sims 9 Asts: Janičenoks 6		Pts: Causeur 15; Rebs: Falker 13; Asts: Hite 2

Arena Riga, Riga
Attendance: 2,500
Referees: Roberto Chiari (ITA), Apostolos Kalpakas (SWE), Jurgis Laurinavicius (LTU)

29 November 2011
18:45

Report

P.A.O.K. (Greece)	62–71	(Russia) Khimki
Scoring by quarter: 13–11, 17–31, 20–17, 12–12
Pts: Kalampokis 18; Rebs: Giddens 11; Asts: Kalampokis 4		Pts: Lončar 20; Rebs: Planinić 7 Asts: Planinić 6

P.A.O.K. Sports Arena, Thessaloniki
Attendance: 1,400
Referees: Luigi Lamonica (ITA), Sergio Silva (POR), Ingus Baumanis (LAT)

=== Game 4 ===
6 December 2011
16:00

Report

Khimki (Russia)	89–65	(Greece) P.A.O.K.
Scoring by quarter: 22–18, 18–14, 29–13, 20–20
Pts: Kelati 16; Rebs: Lončar 11; Asts: Planinić 4		Pts: Dikoudis 13; Rebs: Kalampokis, Tsakaleris 4 Asts: Giddens 3

Basketball Center of Moscow Region, Khimki
Attendance: 2,000
Referees: Grzegorz Ziemblicki (POL), Oskars Lucis (LAT), Haris Bijedic (BIH)

6 December 2011
20:30

Report

Cholet Basket (France)	72–68	(Latvia) VEF Rīga
Scoring by quarter: 16–12, 23–20, 12–15, 21–21
Pts: Causeur 19; Rebs: Duport 10; Asts: Causeur 4		Pts: Janičenoks 14; Rebs: Cain 9 Asts: Kavaliauskas 3

La Meilleraie, Cholet
Attendance: 4,500
Referees: Andrej Jersan (SLO), Tomas Jasevicius (LTU), Francisco Araña (ESP)

=== Game 5 ===
13 December 2011
16:00

Report

Khimki (Russia)	76–70	(France) Cholet Basket
Scoring by quarter: 18–21, 22–15, 15–20, 21–14
Pts: Lončar 20; Rebs: Monia 7 Asts: Fridzon 5		Pts: Causeur 17; Rebs: Vebobe 9 Asts: Causeur 4

Basketball Center of Moscow Region, Khimki
Attendance: 2,050
Referees: Carl Jungebrand (FIN), Sergey Zashchuk (UKR), Aare Halliko (EST)

13 December 2011
18:45

Report

P.A.O.K. (Greece)	76–81	(Latvia) VEF Rīga
Scoring by quarter: 21–20, 18–26, 18–17, 19–18
Pts: Goree 18; Rebs: Giddens 9 Asts: Wright 5		Pts: Janičenoks 21; Rebs: Kavaliauskas 10; Asts: Valters 4

P.A.O.K. Sports Arena, Thessaloniki
Attendance: 1,100
Referees: Juan Carlos Arteaga (ESP), Sasa Maricic (SRB), Gianluca Mattioli (ITA)

=== Game 6 ===
20 December 2011
20:00

Report

VEF Rīga (Latvia)	68–79	(Russia) Khimki
Scoring by quarter: 11–20, 17–15, 20–23, 20–21
Pts: Millage 19; Rebs: Cain, Sims 6 Asts: Millage 3		Pts: Zhukanenko 19; Rebs: Lončar, Zhukanenko 7 Asts: Planinić 8

Arena Riga, Riga
Attendance: 2,500
Referees: Antonio Conde (ESP), Oscar Lefwerth (SWE), Moritz Reiter (GER)

20 December 2011
20:00

Report

Cholet Basket (France)	69–66	(Greece) P.A.O.K.
Scoring by quarter: 10–23, 27–11, 14–17, 18–15
Pts: Causeur 27; Rebs: Vebobe 8 Asts: Causeur 4		Pts: Kalampokis 18; Rebs: Kalampokis, Kalles 7 Asts: Wright 3

La Meilleraie, Cholet
Attendance: 4,800
Referees: J.C. Garcia Gonzalez (ESP), Renaud Geller (BEL), Arnis Ozols (LAT)
