= Dušan Šakota =

Serbian-Greek basketball player

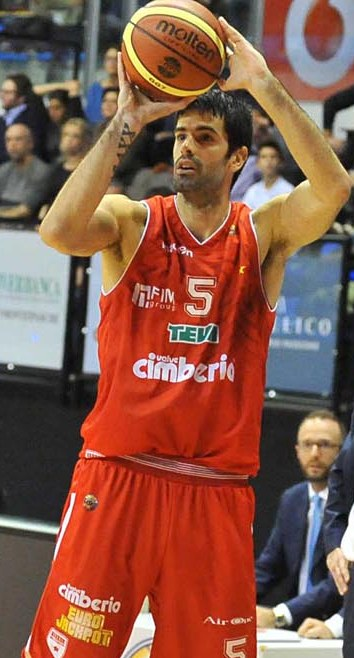
- Sakota in action with Varese

Personal information
- Born: 22 April 1986 (age 40) Belgrade, SR Serbia, SFR Yugoslavia
- Listed height: 6 ft 11 in (2.11 m)
- Listed weight: 230 lb (104 kg)

Career information
- NBA draft: 2008: undrafted
- Playing career: 2003–2020
- Position: Power forward
- Number: 5, 15, 16

Career history
- 2003–2009: Panathinaikos
- 2007–2008: →Panionios
- 2009–2010: Scavolini Pesaro
- 2011–2012: Oostende
- 2012: Enisey
- 2012–2014: Varese
- 2014–2019: AEK Athens
- 2019–2020: UCAM Murcia

Career highlights
- 2× EuroLeague champion (2007, 2009); FIBA Intercontinental Cup champion (2019); FIBA Champions League champion (2018); 2× BCL Star Lineup Second Best Team (2017, 2018); 5× Greek League champion (2004–2007, 2009); 5× Greek Cup winner (2005–2007, 2009, 2018)
Medals
Men's basketball
Representing Greece
FIBA Under-19 World Cup
| Bronze medal – third place | 2003 Greece | Under-19 |
World Military Championship
| Gold medal – first place | 2009 Lithuania |

Dušan Šakota (Serbian Cyrillic: Душан Шакота, Greek: Ντούσαν Σάκοτα Ntousan Sakota, born 22 April 1986) is a Serbian-Greek former professional basketball player. At 6'10 3/4" (2.10 m) tall, he played the power forward position and was known for his shooting ability. He has won two triple crowns in his career. He was the team captain of AEK Athens of the Greek Basket League for five seasons, and with the club, he won the 2018 FIBA Champions League title, the 2018 Greek Cup title, and the 2019 FIBA Intercontinental Cup title.

== Early years ==
Šakota was born in Belgrade, SFR Yugoslavia (now Serbia), but he moved with his family to Greece, at the age of four, when his father, Dragan Šakota, was given the head coaching job with the Greek League club PAOK. In the early 2000s, he played in the Greek junior league competitions, with the junior teams of AEK Athens, which was his father's club at the time.

== Professional career ==
=== Panathinaikos and Panionios ===
In 2003, Šakota signed his first professional contract, with the Greek club Panathinaikos, which was coached by Željko Obradović at the time. He did not play much, due to his young age. He stayed with Panathinaikos until 2007, and won every possible title with the club, including: the prestigious triple crown in his last year: 4 Greek League championships (2003–04, 2004–05, 2005–06, 2006–07), 3 Greek Cups (2004–05, 2005–06, 2006–07), and a EuroLeague title (2006–07). He was also selected to the All-World Team Roster at the 2005 Nike Hoop Summit.

In 2007, he was loaned for the whole Greek League 2007–08 season, to Panionios, in order to get more playing time. He helped Panionios finish 3rd in the Greek League that season, and thus qualify for a place in the next season's EuroLeague; the first time in 12 years that Panionios had qualified for the European-wide top-tier level basketball competition.

In the 2008–09 season, he returned to Panathinaikos, and with them, he won his second triple crown. He got more playing time with Panathinaikos this time, than in his previous time with the club, as he played in 25 games in the Greek League, averaging 5.0 points per game. He also appeared in 9 EuroLeague games with Panathinaikos, during the early stages of the competition, with averages of 8.1 minutes and 3.2 points per game; at the 2009 Berlin EuroLeague Final Four, he was a member of the team's 12 man active roster, but finished both games as an unused substitute.

=== Victoria Libertas Pesaro and the accident ===
Seeking more playing time, Šakota joined the Italian League club Victoria Libertas Pesaro in 2009. Unfortunately, his season in Italy ended before the conclusion of the 2009–10 Italian League season, in a shocking way. On 25 April 2010, Šakota suffered a superficially light injury, after contact with Giuseppe Poeta in a screen during a game versus Teramo. Following an incorrect initial medical diagnosis, which led to an equally wrong surgery the next day, he fell into a coma, caused by septicæmia. Finally, the doctors managed to save his life, but he had to cease playing basketball for a long period.

=== Oostende, Enisey, and Pallacanestro Varese ===
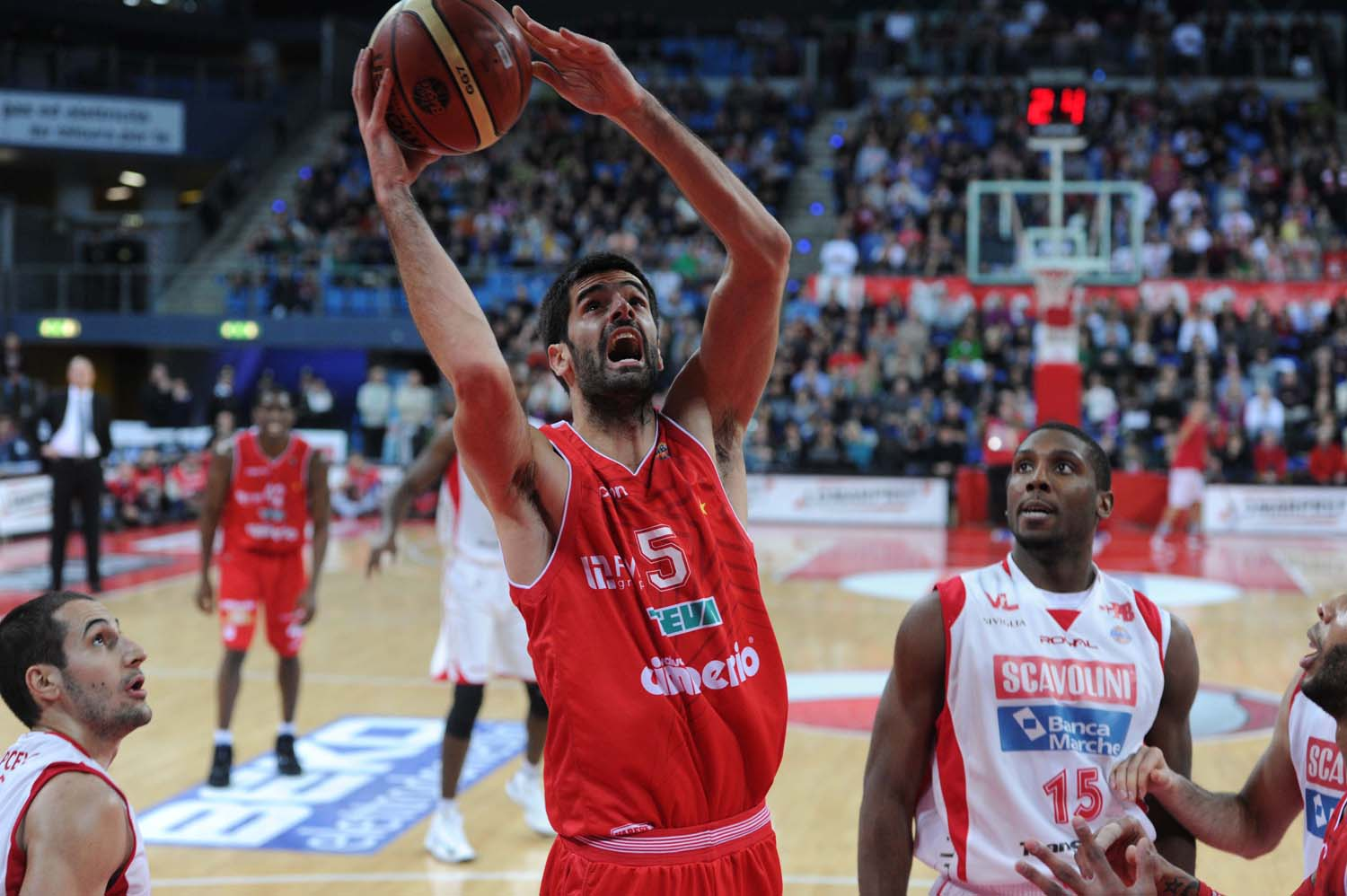
Šakota, playing with Pallacanestro Varese, in 2013.

In the summer of 2011, after a year of recovery from severe septicæmia, Šakota joined the Belgian League club Oostende. His contract with the team was terminated by mutual consent, in December 2011. During the 2011–12 season's winter transfer window, Šakota was released from Oostende.

In the following days after he was released by Oostende, he signed a contract with the Russian League club Enisey. After playing with Enisey, Šakota signed a two-year contract with Pallacanestro Varese of the Italian League, on 17 July 2012.

=== AEK Athens ===
In September 2014, Šakota signed a contract with the Greek Basket League club AEK Athens, the club for which he had previously played as a youth player. He became the club's team captain. On 28 June 2017, Šakota signed a contract extension with AEK Athens, lasting through the 2019–20 season.

With AEK, he was named to the European-wide 3rd-tier level Basketball Champions League's Star Lineup Second Best Team, of the 2016–17 season. With AEK, he won the 2018 Final of the Greek Cup. He also won the Basketball Champions League championship in 2018.

== National team career ==
=== Greek junior national team ===
Šakota holds dual citizenship; Serbian (former Yugoslav) by birth, and Greek, because he's been permanently living in Greece, since his young childhood. In 2003, he declared his eligibility to play with Greece's national teams, although, according to the press, his father, Dragan, preferred for him to play with Serbia.

Between 2003 and 2006, he represented Greece at the junior levels, in a total of 59 games, averaging 13.5 points per game. He was a member of the Greek junior national team that won the bronze medal at the 2003 FIBA Under-19 World Cup. He also represented Greece at the World Military Championship in 2009.

=== Greek senior national team ===
Šakota has also been a member of the senior men's Greek national basketball team. He played at the 2019 FIBA World Cup qualification.

== Personal life ==
Šakota is the son of former professional basketball player and coach, Dragan Šakota, and the brother of former professional basketball player and coach, Miloš Šakota.

== Career statistics ==
Legend
| GP | Games played | GS | Games started | MPG | Minutes per game |
| FG% | Field-goal percentage | 3P% | 3-point field-goal percentage | FT% | Free-throw percentage |
| RPG | Rebounds per game | APG | Assists per game | SPG | Steals per game |
| BPG | Blocks per game | PPG | Points per game | PIR | Performance index rating |
| **Bold** | Career high |

=== EuroLeague ===
| † | Denotes seasons in which Šakota won the EuroLeague |

| Year | Team | GP | GS | MPG | FG% | 3P% | FT% | RPG | APG | SPG | BPG | PPG | PIR |
|---|---|---|---|---|---|---|---|---|---|---|---|---|---|
| 2003–04 | Panathinaikos | 2 | 0 | 3.5 | .000 | .000 | — | — | **.5** | .5 | — | 0.0 | 0.0 |
| 2004–05 | Panathinaikos | 7 | 0 | 7.6 | .333 | .364 | **1.000** | 1.3 | .1 | .1 | — | 2.3 | 0.1 |
| 2005–06 | Panathinaikos | **14** | 0 | **10.5** | **.453** | **.407** | .667 | **1.4** | .2 | .3 | — | **4.5** | 1.4 |
| 2006–07 | Panathinaikos | 10 | **1** | 9.0 | .423 | .300 | .800 | 1.0 | **.5** | **.6** | — | 3.2 | **2.7** |
| 2008–09† | Panathinaikos | 9 | 0 | 8.1 | .440 | .316 | **1.000** | **1.4** | .3 | — | — | 3.2 | 1.9 |
| Career | | 42 | 1 | 23.1 | .421 | .346 | .786 | 1.2 | .3 | .3 | — | 3.3 | 1.5 |

=== Domestic Leagues ===
==== Regular season ====
Note: Only games in the primary domestic competitions are included. Therefore, games in cup or European competitions are left out.

| Year | Team | League | GP | MPG | FG% | 3P% | FT% | RPG | APG | SPG | BPG | PPG |
|---|---|---|---|---|---|---|---|---|---|---|---|---|
| 2003–04 | Panathinaikos | GBL | 17 | 8.1 | .358 | .280 | .000 | 1.1 | .1 | .2 | 0 | 2.0 |
| 2004–05 | Panathinaikos | GBL | 12 | 13.3 | .527 | .459 | .875 | 1.9 | 0 | .5 | .1 | 6.8 |
| 2005–06 | Panathinaikos | GBL | 19 | 11.5 | .573 | .500 | .823 | 1.6 | .1 | .6 | 0 | 7.0 |
| 2006–07 | Panathinaikos | GBL | 20 | 12.3 | .373 | .255 | .666 | 1.9 | .4 | .3 | .1 | 3.8 |
| 2007–08 | Panionios | GBL | 23 | **29.1** | .517 | .440 | .923 | **4.3** | .9 | **1.0** | **.4** | 11.3 |
| 2008–09 | Panathinaikos | GBL | 20 | 12.0 | **.591** | **.511** | .666 | 1.8 | .2 | .3 | .2 | 5.6 |
| 2014–15 | A.E.K. | GBL | **25** | 27.0 | .446 | .346 | .784 | 3.4 | **2.4** | .8 | .2 | 12.4 |
| 2015–16 | A.E.K. | GBL | 24 | 18.4 | .473 | .367 | .815 | 1.9 | 1.0 | .5 | .2 | 7.4 |
| 2016–17 | A.E.K. | GBL | 24 | 23.2 | .503 | .320 | **.950** | 2.5 | 1.2 | .8 | .2 | 12.3 |
| 2017–18 | A.E.K. | GBL | 22 | 23.5 | .503 | .414 | .896 | 3.7 | 1.4 | .3 | .3 | **13.1** |
| 2018–19 | A.E.K. | GBL | 23 | 20.5 | .531 | .412 | .776 | 3.2 | .9 | .4 | .3 | 10.3 |

==== Playoffs ====
| Year | Team | League | GP | MPG | FG% | 3P% | FT% | RPG | APG | SPG | BPG | PPG |
|---|---|---|---|---|---|---|---|---|---|---|---|---|
| 2003–04 | Panathinaikos | GBL | 5 | 12.3 | .555 | .461 | **1.000** | 1.2 | .4 | .2 | .2 | 5.4 |
| 2004–05 | Panathinaikos | GBL | 1 | 3.1 | .000 | .000 | .000 | 0 | 0 | 0 | 0 | 0 |
| 2005–06 | Panathinaikos | GBL | 5 | 7.5 | .461 | .375 | .000 | .6 | .6 | .2 | 0 | 3.0 |
| 2006–07 | Panathinaikos | GBL | 2 | 7.5 | .250 | .250 | .000 | 1.5 | .5 | 0 | 0 | 1.5 |
| 2007–08 | Panionios | GBL | **12** | 21.5 | .530 | **.477** | .600 | 2.4 | 1.0 | **.8** | .2 | 8.3 |
| 2008–09 | Panathinaikos | GBL | 5 | 7.5 | .357 | .200 | .000 | 0 | .2 | .2 | 0 | 2.4 |
| 2014–15 | A.E.K. | GBL | 3 | **25.4** | **.652** | .454 | .714 | 2.3 | **2.0** | .6 | 0 | **15.0** |
| 2015–16 | A.E.K. | GBL | 9 | 20.2 | .480 | .467 | .909 | 2.2 | .9 | .3 | .7 | 9.6 |
| 2016–17 | A.E.K. | GBL | 8 | 20.2 | .389 | .346 | **1.000** | 3.4 | 1.6 | .6 | .3 | 8.3 |
| 2017–18 | A.E.K. | GBL | 2 | 23.4 | .429 | .167 | .714 | **3.5** | **2.0** | .5 | **1.5** | 9.0 |
| 2018–19 | A.E.K. | GBL | **12** | 21.0 | .424 | .408 | .855 | 3.3 | .7 | .5 | .3 | 12.1 |

=== FIBA Champions League ===
| † | Denotes seasons in which Dusan Sakota won the FIBA Champions League |

| Year | Team | GP | MPG | FG% | 3P% | FT% | RPG | APG | SPG | BPG | PPG |
|---|---|---|---|---|---|---|---|---|---|---|---|
| 2016–17 | A.E.K. | 16 | 23.8 | **.514** | **.405** | .900 | 4.1 | **1.8** | .4 | .4 | 13.5 |
| 2017–18† | A.E.K. | **19** | **25.8** | .484 | .400 | .800 | 4.2 | 1.2 | .4 | .4 | **14.0** |
| 2018–19 | A.E.K. | 15 | 24.8 | .430 | .304 | **.953** | 4.3 | 1.7 | **.5** | .3 | 11.9 |

== Awards and achievements ==
=== Pro career ===
- 5× Greek League Champion: (2004, 2005, 2006, 2007, 2009)
- 5× Greek Cup Winner: (2005, 2006, 2007, 2009, 2018)
- 2× EuroLeague Champion: (2007, 2009)
- 2× Triple Crown Champion: (2007, 2009)
- 2× BCL Star Lineup Second Best Team: (2017, 2018)
- FIBA Champions League Champion: (2018)
- FIBA Intercontinental Cup Champion: (2019)

=== Greek junior national team ===
- 2003 FIBA Under-19 World Cup: Bronze
- 2005 Nike Hoop Summit All-World Team
- 2009 World Military Championship: Gold
