= Milan Milošević =

Bosnian basketball player

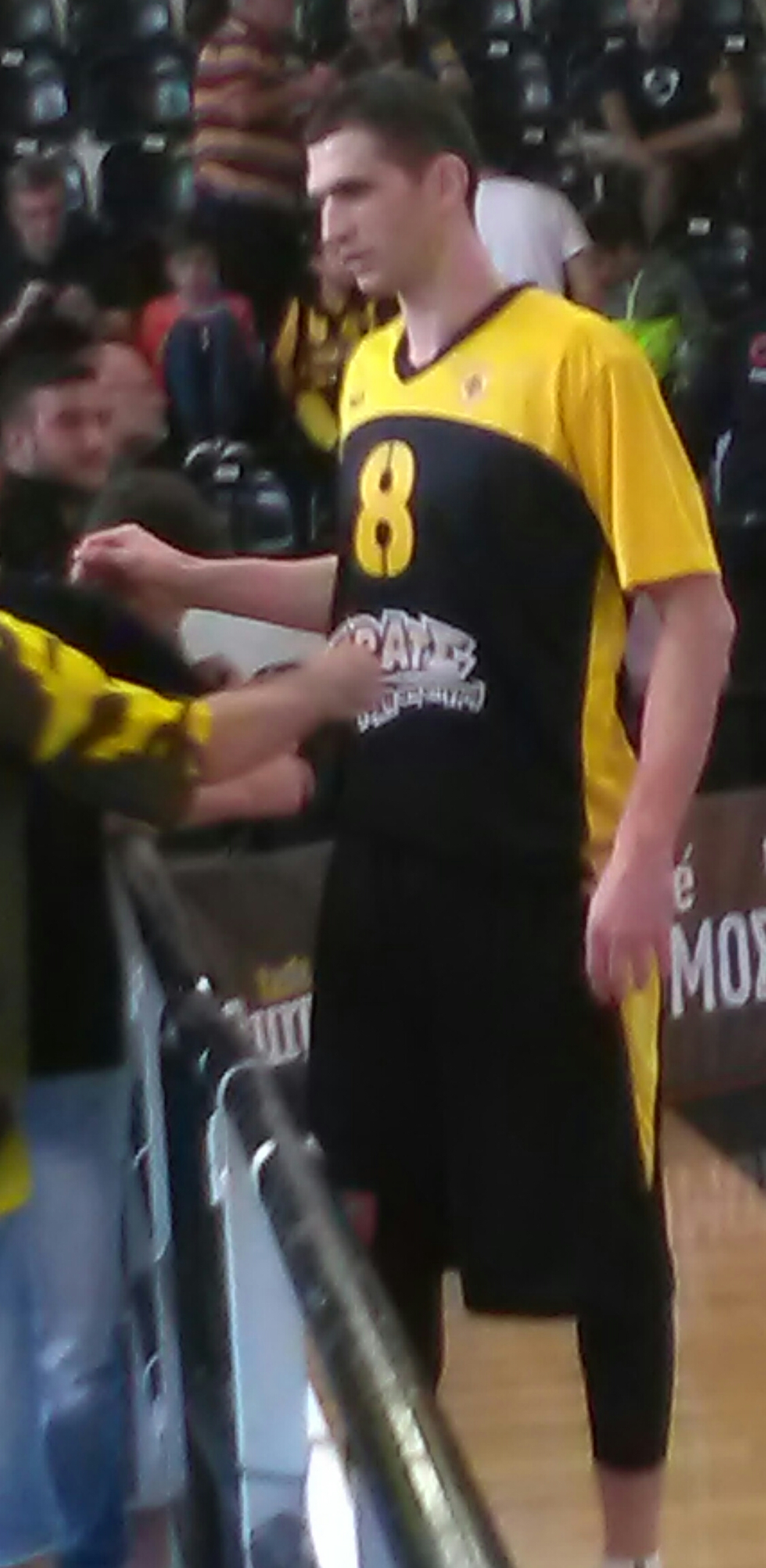
- Milošević with AEK in 2016.

OKK Spars
- Position: Power forward / small forward
- League: Bosnian League

Personal information
- Born: September 26, 1985 (age 41) Bileća, SR Bosnia-Herzegovina, SFR Yugoslavia
- Listed height: 6 ft 8.75 in (2.05 m)
- Listed weight: 239 lb (108 kg)

Career information
- NBA draft: 2007: undrafted
- Playing career: 2003–present

Career history
- 2003–2005: Hercegovac Bileća
- 2005–2008: Sloboda Tuzla
- 2008–2009: Crvena zvezda
- 2009–2010: Bosna
- 2010: Keravnos
- 2011–2013: Budućnost Podgorica
- 2013–2014: Zlatorog Laško
- 2014–2017: AEK Athens
- 2017–2018: Promitheas Patras
- 2018–2019: Lavrio
- 2019–2021: Aris Thessaloniki
- 2021–2022: Al-Khor
- 2022: Büyükçekmece Basketbol
- 2022: Piratas de La Guaira
- 2022–2023: Shabab Al Ahli
- 2023: Piratas de La Guaira
- 2023–2024: Al-Ittihad
- 2024: Mladost Zemun
- 2024: Piratas de Los Lagos
- 2024–present: Spars Realway

Career highlights
- Greek League All Star (2018); Bosnian Cup winner (2010); 2× Montenegrin League champion (2012, 2013); Montenegrin Cup winner (2012)

Milan Milošević (born September 26, 1985) is a Bosnian professional basketball player. He also represents the senior men's Bosnia and Herzegovina national basketball team. He is 2.05 m (6 ft. 8 3/4 in.) tall, and he can play at both the small forward and power forward positions.

== Professional career ==
Milošević started his pro career with Hercegovac Bileća during the 2003–04 season. In 2005, he moved to Sloboda Tuzla where he played for almost 3 years. In the 2008–09 season, he moved to Serbia and joined Crvena zvezda. He then returned to Bosnia and played for Bosna Sarajevo.

He then moved to Cyprus and played for Keravnos Strovolou in 2010, and later to Budućnost Podgorica in 2011. He joined Zlatorog Laško in 2013.

In 2014, he agreed to terms with Panionios, but he left the club before playing in a single game. Later that season, he signed a one-year contract with AEK. He sometimes came off the bench, while Dušan Šakota served as the team's starting power forward. He had a solid season with AEK, and in August 2015, the team re-signed him for the 2015–16 season. In June 2016, he re-signed with AEK for the 2016–17 season.

On September 22, 2017, after three years with AEK Athens, Milošević joined Promitheas Patras of the Greek Basket League. On July 19, 2018, he agreed to join Lavrio and stay in Greece for another season. He averaged 11.6 points and 5.3 rebounds per game for Lavrio. On August 16, 2019, Milošević signed with Aris. On September 22, 2020, he re-signed with Aris for the 2020–21 season.

On March 31, 2022, he has signed with Büyükçekmece Basketbol of the Turkish Basketbol Süper Ligi (BSL).

== National team career ==
Milošević has also been a member of the senior men's Bosnia and Herzegovina national basketball team. With Bosnia's senior national team, he played at the EuroBasket 2011. He was also called by Bosnian head coach, Duško Ivanović, to participate at the team's training camp for EuroBasket 2015, and he managed to make the team's final roster and play at the tournament.

== Career statistics ==
Legend
GP	Games played	MPG	Minutes per game	FG%	Field goal percentage
3P%	3-point field goal percentage	FT%	Free throw percentage	RPG	Rebounds per game
APG	Assists per game	SPG	Steals per game	BPG	Blocks per game
PPG	Points per game	**Bold**	Career high		Led the league

Note: Only games in the primary domestic competitions are included. Therefore, games in cup or European competitions are left out

Year	Team	League	GP	MPG	FG%	3P%	FT%	RPG	APG	SPG	BPG	PPG
2014–15	AEK	GBL	26	17.0	.432	.189	.714	5.3	1.3	0.6	0.1	6.8
2015–16	AEK	GBL	26	19.5	.417	**.312**	**.750**	5.5	1.0	0.6	**0.2**	8.7
2016–17	AEK	GBL	14	22.1	.402	.206	.673	**5.7**	1.1	**0.7**	**0.2**	8.7
2017–18	Promitheas	GBL	20	**25.3**	**.489**	.297	.619	**5.7**	**1.4**	0.5	**0.2**	**12.6**

=== Playoffs ===
Year	Team	League	GP	MPG	FG%	3P%	FT%	RPG	APG	SPG	BPG	PPG
2014–15	AEK	GBL	3	21.2	.315	.250	.571	**8.3**	**2.3**	**1.3**	0.0	6.0
2015–16	AEK	GBL	**10**	**23.3**	**.470**	**.345**	**.773**	6.9	1.2	0.5	**0.4**	**8.9**
2016–17	AEK	GBL	9	22.0	.422	.192	.450	6.6	0.9	0.2	0.0	7.6
2017–18	Promitheas	GBL	1	23.1	**.571**	**.500**	**1.000**	4.0	**2.0**	0	0	**12.0**

=== FIBA Champions League ===
Year	Team	GP	MPG	FG%	3P%	FT%	RPG	APG	SPG	BPG	PPG
2016–17	A.E.K.	13	20.3	.478	.217	.758	5.6	.7	.8	.4	7.2
