= T. J. Carter (basketball) =

American basketball player (born 1985)

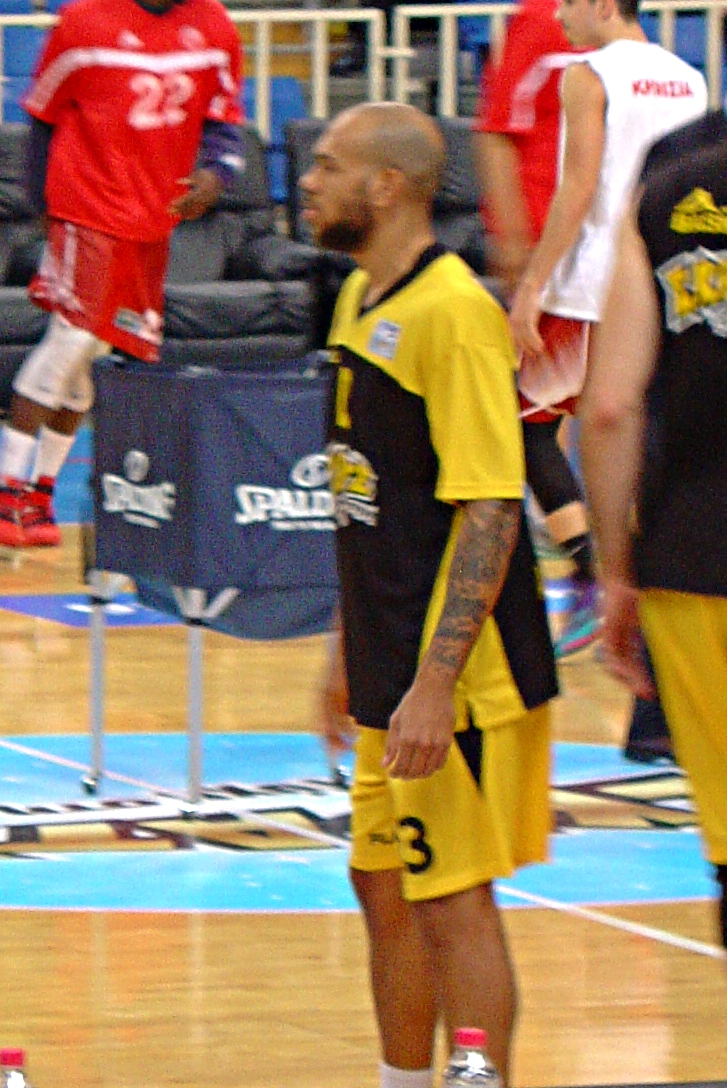
- Carter with AEK Athens in 2016

Personal information
- Born: May 22, 1985 (age 41) Mechanicsville, Maryland, U.S.
- Listed height: 6 ft 3.75 in (1.92 m)
- Listed weight: 210 lb (95 kg)

Career information
- High school: Chopticon (Morganza, Maryland)
- College: UNC Wilmington (2003–2008)
- NBA draft: 2008: undrafted
- Playing career: 2008–2019
- Position: Shooting guard

Career history
- 2008–2010: Düsseldorf Giants
- 2010–2011: AEL Limassol
- 2011–2012: Phoenix Hagen
- 2012–2013: Rethymno
- 2013–2014: Panionios
- 2014–2015: PAOK Thessaloniki
- 2015–2016: AEK Athens
- 2016–2017: Stal Ostrów Wielkopolski
- 2017: Lietuvos rytas Vilnius
- 2017–2018: Stal Ostrów Wielkopolski
- 2018–2018: Quimsa
- 2019: CSM Oradea

Career highlights
- First-team All-CAA (2008); CAA tournament MVP (2006)

Marc Antonio Carter (born May 22, 1985), commonly known as T. J. Carter, is an American former professional basketball player. He is a 1.92 m (6 ft 3 3/4 in) tall shooting guard.

== College career ==
Carter played college basketball at North Carolina-Wilmington, with the UNC Wilmington Seahawks, from 2003 to 2008.

== Professional career ==
Carter began his pro career in the German League with the Düsseldorf Giants in 2008. He then played with the Cypriot League club AEL Limassol. He moved to the German club Phoenix Hagen in 2011.

He next played with the Greek League club Rethymno, before joining the Greek club Panionios in 2013. He moved to the Greek club PAOK in 2014. In June 2015, he signed with AEK Athens.

Carter joined the Polish Stal Ostrów Wielkopolski on November 12, 2016.

On July 22, 2017, Carter signed with Lietuvos rytas Vilnius of the Lithuanian Basketball League, but could not adapt to become a part of head coach Kurtinaitis' tactics, so eventually the contract was terminated by mutual agreement on November 11, 2017.

On December 21, 2017, Carter signed a contract with Stal Ostrów Wielkopolski in Poland.

== Statistics ==
=== Domestic Leagues ===
==== Regular season ====
Note: Only games in the primary domestic competitions are included. Therefore, games in cup or European competitions are left out.

| Year | Team | League | GP | MPG | FG% | 3P% | FT% | RPG | APG | SPG | BPG | PPG | |
|---|---|---|---|---|---|---|---|---|---|---|---|---|---|
| 2012–13 | (Greece) Rethymno | GBL | 26 | | 23.2 | .514 | .404 | .836 | 3.3 | 1.5 | 1.3 | 0.0 | 11.8 |
| 2013–14 | (Greece) Panionios | GBL | 25 | | 24.1 | .423 | .384 | .785 | 3.4 | 1.6 | 0.8 | 0.2 | 9.5 |
| 2014–15 | (Greece) PAOK | GBL | 25 | | 29.0 | .426 | .336 | .847 | 4.0 | 2.1 | 1.1 | 0.2 | 12.5 |
| 2015–16 | (Greece) AEK Athens | GBL | 25 | | 18.8 | .423 | .346 | .731 | 2.7 | 1.5 | 1.0 | 0.4 | 6.3 |
| 2017–18 | (Lithuania) Lietuvos rytas | LKL | 8 | | 14.6 | .385 | .200 | .875 | 1.5 | 2.6 | 0.8 | 0.4 | 6.1 |
