= Malik Hairston =

American basketball player (born 1987)

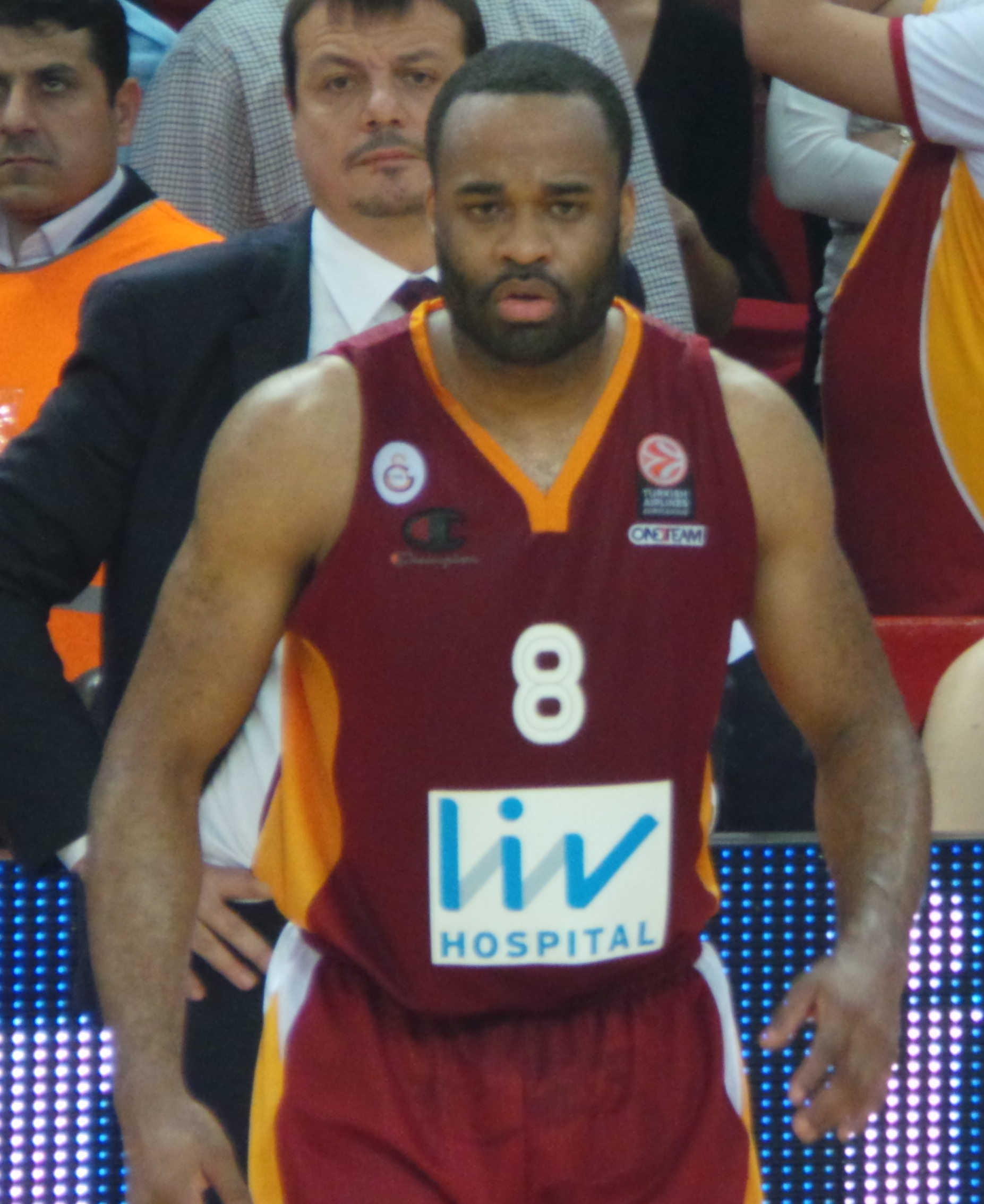
- Hairston with Galatasaray in 2013

Personal information
- Born: February 23, 1987 (age 39) Detroit, Michigan, U.S.
- Listed height: 6 ft 6 in (1.98 m)
- Listed weight: 220 lb (100 kg)

Career information
- High school: Renaissance (Detroit, Michigan)
- College: Oregon (2004–2008)
- NBA draft: 2008: 2nd round, 48th overall pick
- Drafted by: Phoenix Suns
- Playing career: 2008–2019
- Position: Shooting guard / small forward
- Number: 1, 7, 8

Career history
- 2008: Austin Toros
- 2008–2010: San Antonio Spurs
- 2010: Austin Toros
- 2010–2011: Montepaschi Siena
- 2011–2013: Olimpia Milano
- 2013–2014: Galatasaray
- 2015–2016: AEK Athens
- 2017: Hapoel Jerusalem
- 2018–2019: Fos Provence Basket

Career highlights
- Israeli Super League champion (2017); Italian League champion (2011); First-team Parade All-American (2004); McDonald's All-American (2004)
- Stats at NBA.com
- Stats at Basketball Reference

Malik Samory Hairston (born February 23, 1987) is an American former professional basketball player. A shooting guard-small forward from the University of Oregon's Ducks, he was chosen in the 2008 NBA draft by the Phoenix Suns, who then traded him to the San Antonio Spurs. Hairston has also played with the San Antonio Spurs, the Austin Toros (the Spurs' D-League affiliate), Montepaschi Siena and Olimpia Milano of the Italian League, and Galatasaray of the Turkish League. He was born in Detroit, Michigan.

== High school career ==
Prior to arriving at the University of Oregon, Hairston attended Renaissance High School in Detroit, Michigan playing alongside fellow all-American Joe Crawford, former Fordham point guard Marcus Stout, and stand-out guard Adam Sabree. His former Oregon teammate, Tajuan Porter, also attended Renaissance High School. Hairston led his high school team to a 27–0 record, the Class B state title and a No. 3 national ranking by USA Today. He was a top 10 rated recruit by virtually every publication and played in the 2004 McDonald's All-America game.

Considered a five-star recruit by Rivals.com, Hairston was listed as the No. 1 shooting guard and the No. 7 player in the nation in 2004.

== College career ==
Hairston was an important asset for the Ducks from the moment he stepped on the floor as a freshman. Hairston and his teammates Maarty Leunen and Bryce Taylor became three of the eleven players in Oregon history to record 1,000 career points as juniors. Injuries slowed his production in 2006–2007 but Hairston was instrumental to the Ducks' late-season run and Elite Eight appearance in the 2007 NCAA Division I tournament. He scored a career-high 29 points in a 97–88 win over Western Michigan on November 12, 2007, and matched that in an 84–74 win over the Jerryd Bayless-less Arizona Wildcats on January 5, 2008. During his college career he grabbed 12 rebounds on two separate occasions, the first in a 58–56 loss to Stanford on February 26, 2005, and in an 88–54 win over Idaho State on December 17, 2006. He closed out his career with team-highs of 22 points and 7 rebounds in a 76–69 Ducks loss to Mississippi State in the first round of the NCAA tournament.

== Professional career ==
=== San Antonio Spurs ===
Hairston was drafted with the 18th pick in the second round (48th overall) of the 2008 NBA draft by the Phoenix Suns (which acquired the pick from the Cleveland Cavaliers as part of a trade for Milt Palacio). He was subsequently traded to the San Antonio Spurs with cash for Goran Dragić. Hairston didn't make the roster at the end of training camp on October 26, 2008, but was re-signed by the Spurs on December 22. In his second season with the Spurs, Hairston was released in late July 2010 after the signing of Gary Neal and the subsequent log jam at the guard position.

=== Montepaschi Siena ===
On July 29, 2010, Hairston signed with the reigning Italian league champions Montepaschi Siena. Shortly after his debut for Montepaschi, he would miss three weeks after undergoing surgery for a hernia. Despite being limited to only 16 games in his first season in the Lega Basket Serie A, a healthy Hairston would find good form for Montepaschi right before the start of the Final 16 Round Robin of the EuroLeague playoffs. After finishing second in the round of sixteen, Montepaschi would advance to play Olympiacos B.C. in a best of five series in the quarterfinals. Montepaschi would be resoundingly beat in the first game but would bounce back to win game two 82–65, with Hairston scoring 19 points and grabbing 11 boards, garnering him the Sportingbet MVP award for the game 2. Montepaschi won game 3. It would be Hairston again who would lead the way in game 5 with 25 points, 7 boards, 3 assists and a steal to again win the Sportingbet MVP Award, and in doing so becoming the first player to win the award twice in a playoff series. Montepaschi would go on to win the series and reach the Final Four of the tournament, something, they hadn't achieved in four years. They were then drawn away against Panathinaikos, where the eventual champions would beat them 77–69. Malik Hairston's 12 points and 4 rebounds weren't enough to help push them through to the finals. But as consolation, Montepaschi would compete in the third place match against Real Madrid, the team that finished above them in the round of sixteen, and win it 82–60. After a successful first season in Italy and the Euroleague Malik Hairston would leave the team to sign with Olimpia Milano.

=== Olimpia Milano ===
On July 25, 2011, Hairston officially signed a contract with Olimpia Milano. After averaging 13.9 points per game in the EuroLeague and 12.7 points in the Serie A in his first season with the team, there were rumors that the Russian team CSKA Moscow was interested in him, but eventually he signed a new two-year contract with Olimpia Milano. In his second season with Olimpia, he averaged 11.4 points per game in the EuroLeague. However, in July 2013, the president of the team confirmed in a press conference that Hairston was free to leave the team.

=== Galatasaray ===
In November 2013, Hairston signed with Galatasaray until the end of the season.

=== AEK Athens ===
On January 15, 2015, Hairston signed with AEK Athens of the Greek Basket League. On July 10, 2015, he extended his contract with AEK Athens for another two years. On August 31, 2016, Hairston's contract was officially terminated by AEK, due to failing to pass the medical examinations before the 2016–17 campaign.

=== Hapoel Jerusalem ===
On January 2, 2017, Hairston signed with Israeli club Hapoel Jerusalem for the rest of the season.

=== Fos Provence Basket ===
After not playing for a season, on August 9, 2018, Hairston signed with the French club Fos Provence Basket.

== Awards and accomplishments ==
- 2005 Pac-10 All-Freshman Team
- 2006 All-Pac-10 Honorable Mention

== Career statistics ==
Legend
GP	Games played	GS	Games started	MPG	Minutes per game
FG%	Field-goal percentage	3P%	3-point field-goal percentage	FT%	Free-throw percentage
RPG	Rebounds per game	APG	Assists per game	SPG	Steals per game
BPG	Blocks per game	PPG	Points per game	PIR	Performance index rating
**Bold**	Career high

=== NBA ===
==== Regular season ====
Year	Team	GP	GS	MPG	FG%	3P%	FT%	RPG	APG	SPG	BPG	PPG
2008–09	San Antonio	15	0	**10.3**	.490	.000	.286	**1.9**	**.9**	**.4**	**.5**	**3.3**
2009–10	San Antonio	**47**	0	6.7	**.526**	**.182**	**.567**	1.0	.3	.1	.2	2.1
Career		62	0	7.6	.512	.167	.514	1.2	.5	.2	.3	2.4

=== EuroLeague ===
Year	Team	GP	GS	MPG	FG%	3P%	FT%	RPG	APG	SPG	BPG	PPG	PIR
2010–11	Montepaschi	16	8	18.4	**.544**	.368	.718	**3.2**	1.0	**1.0**	.3	8.6	7.4
2011–12	Milano	12	4	24.2	.538	.480	**.763**	3.1	1.5	.1	**.4**	**13.9**	**12.2**
2012–13	Milano	10	10	**30.0**	.438	**.500**	.680	2.2	**1.8**	.7	.3	11.4	7.5
2013–14	Galatasaray	**21**	**21**	28.0	.429	.250	.681	2.5	1.6	.4	.3	8.4	6.0
Career		59	43	25.1	.462	.383	.709	2.9	1.4	.5	.3	10.1	7.9

=== Domestic Leagues ===
==== Regular season ====
Note: Only games in the primary domestic competitions are included. Therefore, games in cup or European competitions are left out.

Year	Team	League	GP	MPG	FG%	3P%	FT%	RPG	APG	SPG	BPG	PPG
2014–15	(Greece) AEK	GBL	30	24.0	.562	.393	.726	2.7	1.9	0.8	0.5	8.8
