= Nondas Papantoniou =

Greek basketball player

Syllas Edipsos
- Position: Point guard / shooting guard
- League: Greek National League 2

Personal information
- Born: 28 April 1990 (age 36) Cholargos, Greece
- Listed height: 6 ft 2.8 in (1.90 m)
- Listed weight: 215 lb (98 kg)

Career information
- Playing career: 2007–present

Career history
- 2007–2009: Maroussi
- 2009–2010: A.E.K. Athens
- 2010–2011: Ilysiakos
- 2011–2013: Peristeri
- 2013–2014: Kolossos Rhodes
- 2014–2016: A.E.K. Athens
- 2016: Araberri
- 2016–2017: Força Lleida
- 2017: Promitheas Patra
- 2017–2018: Faros Larissa
- 2018: P.A.O.K. Thessaloniki
- 2018–2019: Panionios
- 2019–2020: Larissa
- 2020–2021: P.A.O.K. Thessaloniki
- 2021: Craiova
- 2021–2022: Larissa
- 2022–2023: Iraklis
- 2023–2025: Esperos Lamia
- 2025: Iraklis
- 2025–present: Syllas Edipsos

Career highlights
- Greek Elite League assists leader (2023)
Medals
Men's basketball
Representing Greece
FIBA Under-19 World Cup
Silver medal – second place	2009 New Zealand	U-19 Team
FIBA Europe Under-20 Championship
Silver medal – second place	2010 Croatia	U-20 Team
FIBA Europe Under-18 Championship
Gold medal – first place	2008 Greece	U-18 Team
Albert Schweitzer Tournament
Gold medal – first place	2008 Germany	U-18 Team

Epameinondas-Savvas "Nondas" Papantoniou (alternate spellings: Epaminondas, Epameinontas, Nontas) (Greek: Επαμεινώνδας-Σάββας "Νώντας" Παπαντωνίου; born 28 April 1990) is a Greek professional basketball player of Greek National League 2 club Syllas Edipsos. He is a 1.91 m (6 ft 3 in) tall combo guard.

== Professional career ==
Papantoniou began his professional career in the 2007–08 season with the Greek League club Maroussi. After two seasons, he moved to AEK Athens. He then moved to Ilysiakos. He joined Peristeri in 2011 and spent two seasons there. He moved to Kolossos in 2013. Papantoniou returned to AEK Athens in 2014.

On 18 August 2015 Papantoniou extended his contract with AEK Athens for another two years, but left the team halfway through that contract.

On 11 December 2016 Papantoniou joined Força Lleida of the LEB Oro. On 22 January 2017 he returned to Greece and joined Promitheas Patras for the rest of the season.

On 30 September 2018, due to the injuries of Phil Goss and Apollon Tsochlas, Papantoniou joined PAOK on a monthly contract. He was released on 4 November 2018. Papantoniou then finished the season with Panionios, leading them to avoid relegation, with an average of 11.3 points and 3.9 assists per game.

Papantoniou spent the 2019–20 season with Larisa, having a career-high 11 points and 5 assists per game.

On 23 July 2020 he agreed on a two-year contract with his former team PAOK, thus returning to Thessaloniki. On 23 June 2021 PAOK opted out of their contract and Papantoniou became a free agent.

He signed back with Larisa on 10 November 2021, after starting the season in Romania with Craiova. In 30 league games, he averaged 2.9 points, 1.5 rebounds and 1 assist, playing around 12 minutes per game.

== National team career ==
As a member of the junior national basketball teams of Greece, Papantoniou played at the 2006 FIBA Europe Under-16 Championship. He won the gold medal at the 2008 FIBA Europe Under-18 Championship, and the silver medal at the 2009 FIBA Under-19 World Championship. He also won the silver medal at the 2010 FIBA Europe Under-20 Championship.

== Personal life ==
He was in relationship with the famous Greek influencer Ioanna Touni.
