= Dragan Šakota =

Serbian-Greek basketball player and coach

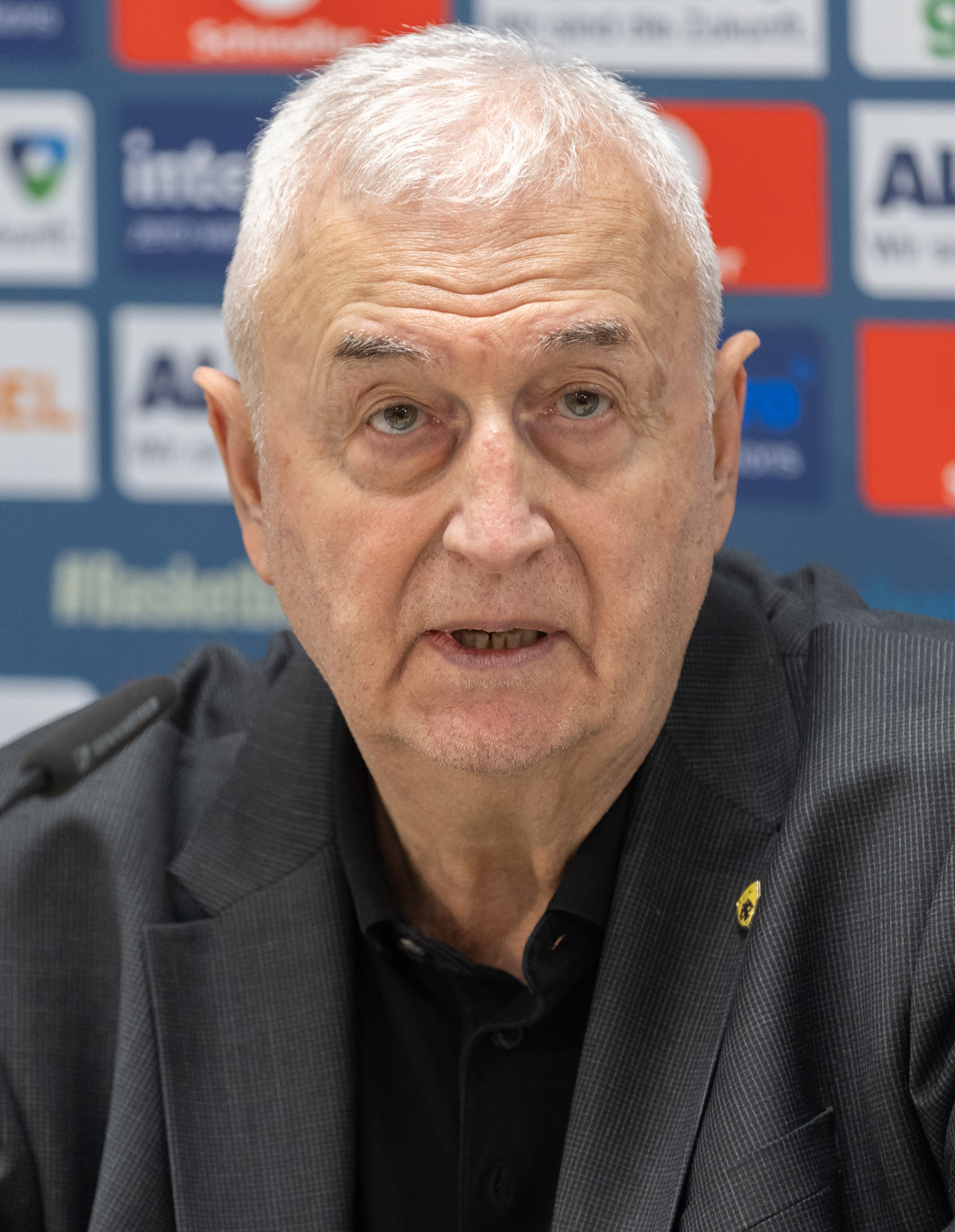
- Šakota in 2026

AEK Athens
- Position: Head coach
- League: GBL

Personal information
- Born: 16 June 1952 (age 74) Belgrade, PR Serbia, FPR Yugoslavia
- Listed height: 6 ft 6 in (1.98 m)

Career information
- Playing career: 1972–1983
- Coaching career: 1983–present

Career history

Playing
- 1972–1983: IMT

Coaching
- 1983–1988: IMT
- 1988–1989: Zadar
- 1989–1990: Cibona
- 1990–1991: PAOK
- 1992–1993: Apollon Patras
- 1993–1994: Iraklis
- 1994–1995: PAOK
- 1995–1997: Peristeri
- 1998–2000: Iraklis
- 2000–2001: Aris
- 2001–2003: AEK Athens
- 2003–2004: Olympiacos
- 2005–2007: Crvena zvezda
- 2008: Fortitudo Bologna
- 2010–2011: Trabzonspor
- 2011–2012: Antalya BB
- 2014–2016: AEK Athens
- 2017–2018: AEK Athens
- 2019–2020: Crvena zvezda
- 2022: Zaragoza
- 2022–2023: Reggiana
- 2023–2024: New Basket Brindisi
- 2024–present: AEK Athens

Career highlights
- As head coach: FIBA Saporta Cup champion (1991); FIBA Champions League champion (2018); Greek League champion (2002); Greek Cup winner (2018); Yugoslav Cup winner (1987); Serbian Cup winner (2006); FIBA Champions League Best Coach (2026)

Dragan Šakota (Serbian Cyrillic: Драган Шакота, Greek: Ντράγκαν Σάκοτα; born June 16, 1952) is a Serbian and Greek professional basketball coach, currently coaching AEK Athens of the Greek Basketball League (GBL).

== Playing career ==
Šakota spent the entire playing career with the Belgrade-based team IMT. He played there from 1972 to 1983 and won the Yugoslav Federal B League in the 1982/83 season.

== Coaching career ==
=== IMT (1983–1988) ===
After spending his entire career in IMT, Šakota became head coach of the same team right after retiring as a player. His first season as head coach ended very impressive. Finishing in 9th place, he secured the participation of his team in the Yugoslav First Basketball League for the next season. However, the following season didn't end well for the team, as they finished in 12th place and got relegated back to Yugoslav Federal B League, where they stayed for the following 2 seasons. 1986/87 season was a true underdog story for the club, as coach Šakota brought some well-known names such as Milan Mladjan and Srećko Jarić (father of Marko Jarić) and under guidance of the young coach, the team won the Yugoslav Cup at the national cup tournament in Niš. In the semi-finals, they faced an absolute favorite Partizan and won 86-80, with Mladjan scoring 34 points, and in the finals they won against another surprise of the cup Smelt Olimpija that had beaten Jugoplastika Split prior. The final result was 76-73 for IMT and Mladjan was yet again the top scorer of the game, only this time with 25 points, making a comeback for his team. It was the only time in the history of Yugoslav basketball that the cup competition was won by a club not playing in the top-tier First Federal League. The same season IMT achieved promotion to the First Federal League. 1987–88 season was also successful for both Šakota and the club, as the team finished 7th in the league, earning its place for the playoff, but was eliminated by Cibona in the quarter-finals. IMT also participated in the FIBA European Cup Winners' Cup the same season, where they were also stopped in the quarter-finals group, among others by the eventual champion Limoges CSP.

=== Zadar (1988–89) ===
After a very successful period in IMT, Šakota went to coach Zadar in the 1988–89 season. The team improved its results from the previous season under the new coach, reaching the semi-finals of the FIBA Korać Cup, losing both games to Partizan that later won in the finals. However, Zadar failed to do the same in the domestic league, being eliminated to Olimpija in the quarter finals. Nevertheless, Šakota had a huge influence on a promising Arijan Komazec who would become one of the best players in Europe throughout the upcoming years.

=== Cibona (1989–90) ===
After finishing the 1988-89 season with Zadar, Šakota moved to Cibona where he coached until the end of the 1989–90 season. There he also improved the club's results. After being 7th in the previous season, Cibona finished 4th and even went on to play 3 games with the European champion Jugoplastika in the playoff semifinal. Šakota's team also managed to reach the cup semifinal where it was eliminated by Crvena zvezda.

=== PAOK (1990-91) ===
Šakota came to PAOK where was head coach during the 1990-91 season. The season turned out to be one of the most successful in PAOKs history, where the team won the FIBA Saporta Cup, which was the first European trophy in club's history. They were also runners-up in the Greek league as well as the Greek Cup. PAOK faced Aris that had dominated the domestic league 6 consecutive years in the finals and even took a 2-0 lead in the series, but failed to maintain it, losing 2 games in a row and PAOK evened the score. Game 5 is considered as the decisive, as the black and white team had the lead till the last few seconds when Ken Barlow made an in-bound turnover, giving the opportunity to Panagiotis Giannakis to score a long distance buzzer-beater three for the 86-85 win. After that, game 6 ended with Aris defending the title as the final result was 81-80. PAOK lost the cup final against Panionios B.C. 73-70.

=== Apollon Patras (1992–93) ===
Šakota signed with Apollon Patras. With Apollon Patras, he finished in 10th place at the end of the 1992-93 season.

=== Iraklis (1993–94) ===
Another Greek club that the Serbian coach signed contract with was Iraklis. Although Šakota and his team were outsiders, the team, along with Slovenian point guard Jure Zdovc, reached the national cup finals in which they lost to Olympiacos. Šakota left the club when the season was finished.

=== Return to PAOK (1994–95) ===
Šakota crossed his paths with PAOK for the second time. In the meantime, circumstances for the Thessaloniki club changed a bit since Šakota's last presence, with PAOK playing FIBA European League in that season. However, the team, being led by Serbian shooting guard Branislav Bane Prelević, won the national cup. PAOK also finished 4th in the league and managed to reach the last of 16 group where they won 6 games but didn't succeed in passing through the quarter-finals. In that season, Šakota coached 17 year old future NBA All-Star Predrag Stojaković.

=== Peristeri (1995–97) ===
Although he didn't bring any trophies to the club, Šakota's work in Peristeri B.C. is marked as one of his finest, as he developed players like Milan Gurović and Marko Jarić and had good results in the national league. In the first season, Peristeri finished in 7th place, qualifying for the 1996-97 FIBA Korać Cup. The following season was even better, as Peristeri finished 3rd in the Greek league and made it to the quarter-finals of the Korać Cup.

=== Iraklis again (1998–00) ===
After a job well done in Peristeri, Šakota came back to Iraklis where he stayed for 2 seasons. During that period, Iraklis had success in the domestic league, qualifying for the 1999-00 FIBA Saporta Cup by finishing 6th after Šakota's first season as a returner. They didn't stop there, as they found their way to the quarter-finals of the competition, losing to that season's champion AEK. Besides that, Iraklis qualified for the 2000–01 FIBA SuproLeague, finishing 7th in the domestic championship. Šakota and his team were also 3rd in the national cup in the 1998-99 season and 4th in the 1999-00 season. The results from those 2 seasons were more or less in a shadow because Šakota introduced a new name to the Greek league, point guard Dimitris Diamantidis.

=== Aris (2000–01) ===
Šakota signed with Aris B.C. He left the club at the end of the season, as he didn't manage something important, finishing 10th in the league.

=== AEK (2001–03) ===
==== Golden Year (2001–02) ====
The Serbian coach was ready for new challenges as he signed with AEK in the summer of 2001. Right after joining the club, Šakota brought a 19 year old power forward Pero Antić from KK Rabotnički and also brought a new model to the club, putting Ioannis Bourousis into the roster and also giving a young Nikos Zisis the same chance. He also signed J.R. Holden and Chris Carr and made a competitive team for the upcoming season. Šakota led the team to the 2001–02 Euroleague Top 16 phase with 9 wins in the regular season, the most famous against Partizan which ended 106-70 for the Greek team. However, the team misfortunately lost a couple of close games and got eliminated with a 2-4 score in the second phase. Although AEK didn't have any notable result in the cup that season, Šakota lead the team from Athens to the Greek league playoff finals after being 1st in the regular season with a 23-3 score, as they won all games at home. After defeating his former teams Peristeri 3-1 in the quarter-finals and Iraklis B.C. 2-0 in the semi-finals, Šakota's team faced Olympiacos that took a convincing 2-0 lead in the final series, but AEK compensated the deficit and won 3-2, thus winning their first national title since 1970. Šakota immediately became an AEK legend, making history as the only coach since 1992 that has won a national title, but not with Olympiacos or Panathinaikos.

==== 2002–03 ====
After winning the title, AEK management had no choice but to decrease the club's budget 50%, limiting the head coach's chances to repeat the success in the next season. The following season didn't end well for AEK, as they won only one game in 2002–03 Euroleague, finishing with a 1-13 score. Still, they managed to reach the playoff finals again, only this time AEK was 2nd with a 20-6 score. After eliminating another Šakota's former team PAOK 2-0 in the quarter-finals and Olympiacos 2-1 in the semi-finals, AEK was defeated by the Athens-based Panathinaikos 3-1 in the series. And as in the previous season, AEK didn't have any success in the cup.

=== Olympiacos (2003–04) ===
Šakota signed with another Greek club Olympiacos at the end of November in the 2003-04 season, replacing Slobodan Subotić on the bench. Although Olympiacos showed improvement with the arrival of the new coach, the club had one of the worst seasons in its modern history, as the team finished 8th in the league with a 13-13 score and was later eliminated by Panathinaikos in the playoff quarter-finals. They repeated the result in the Euroleague from the previous season, being eliminated in the Top 16 phase. The bright side, however, was the national cup finals that Šakota was able to reach, but Olympiacos lost to Aris 73-70.

=== Crvena Zvezda (2005–07) ===
==== 2005–06 ====
In 2005, Šakota returned to his hometown, where he took over Crvena Zvezda. He instantly brought some of his former players: Milan Gurović, Pero Antić from AEK, Miroslav Raičević with whom he cooperated in Aris and Igor Milošević. He also signed guards Larry O'Bannon and Steven Marković and composed a strong team that can fight for the national title. The first season started pretty well, with the team winning the Radivoj Korać Cup. They eliminated Šakota's former KK Atlas (former IMT) in the quarter-finals and surprisingly eliminated Partizan in the semi-finals 92-83. In the final game, they played against Hemofarm Vršac and won 80-65, with Goran Jeretin being pronounced as the MVP of the tournament. In that season's ULEB Cup Crvena Zvezda played extremely well, advancing through the quarter-finals where they lost to the eventual champion Dynamo Moscow. This was the club's biggest success in European competitions since 1998 and the first season where the club entered the knock-out stage since 2001. Unfortunately, injuries and bad form prevented Zvezda from doing more, as they reached the Goodyear League semi-finals after being 2nd in the regular season with a 19-7 score and lost to eventual champions FMP after eliminating Bosna in the quarter-finals. However, before that happened, Šakota had brought back Tadija Dragićević who was sent on loan to Mega Vizura by Zmago Sagadin, and the young power forward showed his potential right away. The team also reached the national league finals, eliminating FMP 3-2 in the semi-finals, where they lost to Partizan 3-0.

==== 2006–07 ====
Šakota's second season as Crvena Zvezda's head coach wasn't as good as the first. He made some changes in the roster, bringing Billy Thomas, Nemanja Aleksandrov and Vrbica Stefanov who played only one game. He also brought back Petar Popović instead of Vladislav Dragojlović. During the season, Antonio Burks and Branko Jorović joined the team. However, the club was in huge financial difficulties, with the management offering impossible contracts to numerous players, and some of those players ran away while the season was in progress (Thomas, Burks, and later Kebu Stewart). The whole team struggled in the Goodyear League and was eliminated by FMP in the national cup semi-finals, failing to defend the trophy. Despite that, Šakota's team matched the success they had in the previous season of the ULEB Cup, reaching the quarter-finals again and losing to a new champion Real Madrid, that they had won prior in the first phase of the competition 100-81, making that one of the club's greatest wins of the decade and even wider. Šakota resigned in the beginning of March after a 88-82 loss to Olimpija Ljubljana and a 12-11 score in the Adriatic League, losing every chance to qualify for the following season's ULEB Cup, resulting critics and anger from red and white fans, he was replaced by his assistant coach Stevan Karadžić.

=== Fortitudo Bologna (2008) ===
Šakota took over at Fortitudo Bologna, from Andrea Mazzone, who got fired due to poor results, in early January 2008, mid-season 2007–08. At the time, the club had a 7–10 record in their Italian national domestic league, and a 3–4 record in the EuroCup. Šakota finished the 2007–08 season at the club, and also started the 2008–09 season there. In mid-December 2008, he got fired and was replaced by Cesare Pancotto.

=== Turkish clubs (2010–12) ===
On November 16, 2011, Šakota became the new head coach of the Turkish Super League club Antalya Büyükşehir Belediyesi, replacing Serdar Apaydın, but after a few months he was fired again.

=== AEK second stint (2014–18) ===
In 2014, he returned to AEK Athens. He was AEK's head coach from 2014 to 2016, and from 2016 to 2017, he was the club's sports director. He became AEK's head coach again in 2017, and with them, he won the FIBA Champions League and the Greek Cup titles, in 2018.

=== Crvena Zvezda second stint (2019–20) ===
On November 23, 2019, he was named the head coach for the Belgrade-based team Crvena zvezda, for the second time in his career. On 8 June 2020, Šakota parted ways with the Zvezda.

=== Pallacanestro Reggiana, New Basket Brindisi (2022–24) ===
On December 5, 2022, he signed with Pallacanestro Reggiana of the Lega Basket Serie A.

On October 26, 2023, he was appointed as the new head coach for New Basket Brindisi of the Lega Basket Serie A.

=== AEK Athens (2024–present) ===
On June 9, 2024, Šakota returned for the third time to AEK Athens. Following the end of the 2024–25 season, it was announced that he will become the Sports Director of the club. On May 8, 2025, Šakota renewed his contract as a head coach for one more season. On August 27, 2026, it was announced that he will remain as a head coach to the club at least until 2027, and to the operations of the club until 2030.

=== National team coaching career ===
Šakota was an assistant coach of the senior Yugoslav national basketball team, from 1989 to 1990, working as an assistant coach with Yugoslavia at the 1990 FIBA World Championship. He was then an assistant coach of the senior FR Yugoslav national basketball team, at the EuroBasket 1999. He was also an assistant coach of the senior Serbia and Montenegro national basketball team, from 2004 to 2005, working as an assistant at both the 2004 Summer Olympic Games and the EuroBasket 2005.

In 2006, Šakota was the head coach of the Serbia and Montenegro national basketball team at the 2006 FIBA World Championship. Serbia and Montenegro finished the World Championship in 11th place, which was the lowest place finish ever for the Serbian national team at the tournament.

== Personal life ==
Šakota's son, Dušan Šakota, is a professional basketball player, while his other son, Miloš Šakota, is a retired professional basketball player, and professional basketball coach. Famous Serbian coach Miroslav Nikolić is his brother-in law, former teammate and former player. Šakota hold both Serbian and Greek citizenship. He speaks Serbian, English, and Greek fluently.

== See also ==
- List of Radivoj Korać Cup-winning head coaches
- List of KK Crvena zvezda head coaches
