= Giannis Kalampokis =

Greek basketball player (born 1978)

Giannis Kalampokis Γιάννης Καλαμπόκης
- Giannis Kalampokis

Dafni Dafniou
- Title: Head coach
- League: Greek A2 League

Personal information
- Born: August 15, 1978 (age 48) Ilio, Peristeri, Athens, Greece
- Listed height: 6 ft 5 in (1.96 m)
- Listed weight: 210 lb (95 kg)

Career information
- NBA draft: 2000: undrafted
- Playing career: 1999–2016
- Position: Shooting guard / small forward
- Coaching career: 2016–present

Career history

Playing
- 1999–2003: Palaio Faliro
- 2003–2005: Olympiacos
- 2005–2006: AEK Athens
- 2006–2007: PAOK
- 2007–2009: Panionios
- 2009: Benetton Treviso
- 2009–2010: Panionios
- 2010–2011: Ikaros
- 2011–2012: PAOK
- 2012: Alba Berlin
- 2012–2013: Kolossos
- 2013–2015: Rethymno Aegean
- 2015–2016: AEK Athens

Coaching
- 2016–2017: Panionios (Youth Academies)
- 2017–2018: Peristeri (Youth Academies)
- 2017–present: Greece (assistant)
- 2018–2019: Zhejiang Lions (assistant)
- 2019–2020: Peristeri (assistant)
- 2020–present: Dafni Dafniou

Career highlights
- As a player: 2× Greek League All-Star (2007, 2010)
Medals
Men's basketball
Representing Greece
EuroBasket
Bronze medal – third place	2009 Poland

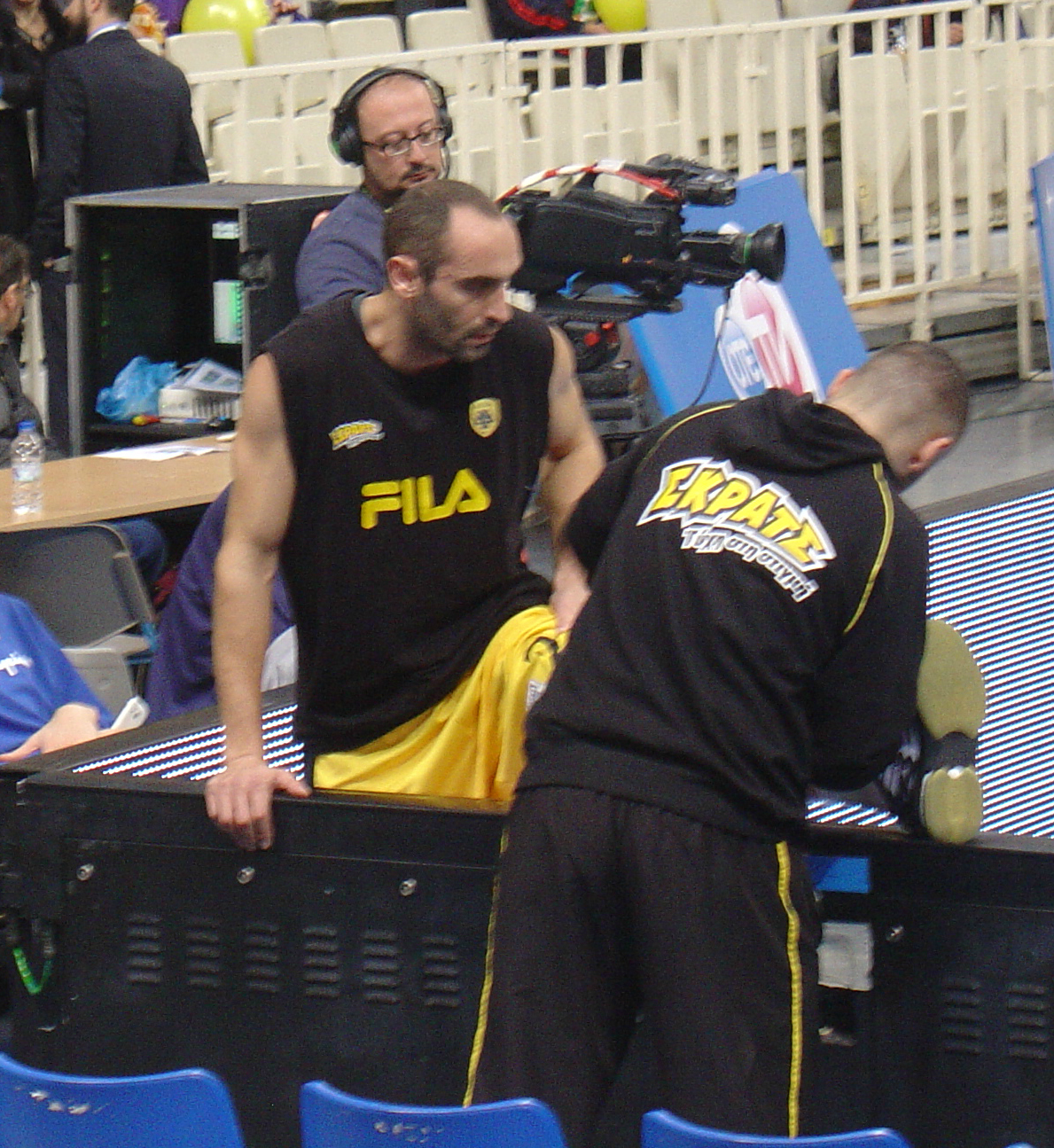
Kalampokis, pictured in the black sleeveless jersey, as a player of AEK Athens, in 2016.

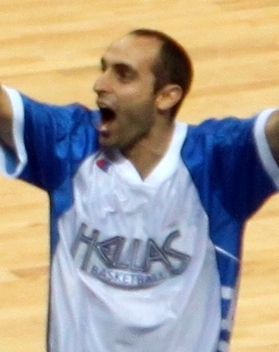
Kalampokis, celebrating Greece's win against Turkey (76–74) in EuroBasket 2009.

Giannis Kalampokis (alternate spellings: Ioannis, Yiannis, Yannis, Kalambokis, Kalabokis) (Greek: Γιάννης Καλαμπόκης; born on August 15, 1978, in Ilio, Peristeri, Athens, Greece) is a Greek former professional basketball player and current basketball coach. At a height of 6 ft 5 in (1.96 m) tall, he mainly played as a swingman. He last played with AEK Athens of the Greek League.

== Professional playing career ==
=== Club career ===
Kalampokis started his career with the Neoi Palatianis juniors team in Greece, and he then made his pro debut in 1999, while playing for Palaio Faliro in the Greek A2 League. In 2003, he made his debut in the top-tier Greek League and the EuroLeague with Olympiacos Piraeus. He then played with the Greek clubs AEK Athens and PAOK Thessaloniki.

In 2007, he signed with the Greek club Panionios. In 2009, he joined the Italian League club Treviso. After playing with Treviso, he moved back to Panionios.

In 2010, he joined the Greek club Ikaros. For the 2011–12 season, he moved back to PAOK, and he finished the season with the German League club Alba Berlin. He played with the Greek club Kolossos during the 2012–13 season, and then joined the Greek club Rethymno Aegean, for the 2013–14 season.

After spending the 2015–16 preseason with Olympiacos, Kalampokis signed with AEK Athens for the season, on October 2, 2015. He announced his retirement from playing basketball on 29 August 2016.

=== National team career ===
Kalampokis also played with the Greece men's national basketball team at the EuroBasket 2009, where they won the bronze medal.

== Coaching career ==
After he retired from playing professional basketball, Kalampokis became a sports commentator for basketball games on Greek TV. He then took a job coaching the youth academies of Panionios. He also worked as the President of the Greek basketball players' union. He then coached the youth academies of Peristeri.

He became an assistant coach of the Greece men's national basketball team, in November 2017.

== Awards and accomplishments ==
=== Pro career ===
- 2× Greek League All-Star: (2007, 2010)

=== Greek senior national team ===
- EuroBasket 2009: Bronze
