= 2018–19 Aris Thessaloniki B.C. season =

Aris Thessaloniki
2018–19 season
- Head coach: Vangelis Angelou (until 17/12/2018); Ioannis Kastritis (since 18/12/2018)
- Basket League: 9th
- Greek Cup: Phase 2
- BCL: Second qualifying round
- FIBA Europe Cup: Regular season
Home	Away

The 2018–19 Aris Thessaloniki B.C. season was the 65th appearance in the top-tier level Greek Basket League for Aris Thessaloniki. The club also competed in the Greek Basketball Cup where was eliminated by Promitheas Patras in Phase 2.

In Europe Aris Thessaloniki was eliminated in Second qualifying round of Basketball Champions League by Russian Nizhny Novgorod. As a loser of BCL's qualifying rounds the club participated in FIBA Europe Cup. Aris Thessaloniki finished in 3rd place of Group G in Regular season and was eliminated.

The club changed its manager in December and hired Ioannis Kastritis

== First-team squad ==
#	Name	Nationality	Position(s)	Height	Date of birth (age)
0	Lucky Jones	(United States)	SG / SF	1.99 m	April 22, 1993 (aged 26)
1	Michale Kyser	(United States)	PF	2.08 m	November 26, 1991 (aged 27)
2	Vassilis Toliopoulos	(Greece)	PG / SG	1.88 m	June 15, 1996 (aged 22)
3	Dimitris Verginis	(Greece)	PG / SG	1.91 m	May 15, 1987 (aged 32)
4	Lefteris Bochoridis	(Greece)	PG / SG	1.96 m	April 18, 1994 (aged 25)
5	Kostas Vlasios	(Greece)	PG / SG	1.90 m	June 5, 2001 (aged 17)
7	Dimitris Flionis	(Greece)	PG / SG	1.90 m	April 8, 1997 (aged 22)
10	Gary Bell	(United States)	SG	1.90 m	October 12, 1992 (aged 26)
11	Stratos Voulgaropoulos	(Greece)	C	2.18 m	October 31, 2000 (aged 18)
12	Boris Dallo	(France)	PG / SG	1.96 m	March 12, 1994 (aged 25)
13	Valantis Kourtidis	(Greece)	PF	2.01 m	November 17, 2001 (aged 17)
14	Vassilis Christidis	(Greece)	PF / C	2.08 m	July 10, 1998 (aged 20)
15	Diamantis Slaftsakis	(Greece)	SF / PF	2.02 m	July 27, 1994 (aged 24)
16	Gary McGhee	(United States)	C	2.11 m	October 28, 1988 (aged 30)
22	Ramon Harris	(United States)	SF / PF	2.01 m	May 26, 1988 (aged 31)
23	Giorgos Angelou	(Greece)	PG / SG	1.93 m	September 30, 1994 (aged 24)

== Competitions ==
=== Overall ===
Competition	Started round	Current position / round	Final position / round	First match	Last match
Greek Basket League	Matchday 1	—	9th	11 September 2020	8 May 2019
Greek Basketball Cup	Phase 2	—	Phase 2	3 October 2018	3 October 2018
Basketball Champions League	First qualifying round	—	Second qualifying round	20 September 2018	28 September 2018
FIBA Europe Cup	Regular season	—	3rd in Group H	17 October 2018	21 November 2018

Updated to match played 8 May 2019
Source: Competitions

=== Overview ===
Competition	Record							
Competition	Pld	W	D	L	PF	PA	PD	Win %
Greek Basket League	26	8	0	18	1,811	1,883	−72	30.77
Greek Basketball Cup	1	0	0	1	65	86	−21	0.00
Basketball Champions League	4	3	0	1	298	243	+55	75.00
FIBA Europe Cup	6	3	0	3	444	432	+12	50.00
Total	37	14	0	23	2,618	2,644	−26	37.84

Last updated: 8 May 2019
Source: Competitions

==== Manager's Overview ====
===== Vangelis Angelou =====
Competition	Record							
Competition	Pld	W	D	L	PF	PA	PD	Win %
Greek Basket League	9	2	0	7	624	668	−44	22.22
Greek Basketball Cup	1	0	0	1	65	86	−21	0.00
Basketball Champions League	4	3	0	1	298	243	+55	75.00
FIBA Europe Cup	6	3	0	3	444	432	+12	50.00
Total	20	8	0	12	1,431	1,429	+2	40.00

Source: Competitions

===== Ioannis Kastritis =====
Competition	Record							
Competition	Pld	W	D	L	PF	PA	PD	Win %
Greek Basket League	17	6	0	11	1,187	1,215	−28	35.29
Greek Basketball Cup	0	0	0	0	0	0	+0	—
Basketball Champions League	0	0	0	0	0	0	+0	—
FIBA Europe Cup	0	0	0	0	0	0	+0	—
Total	17	6	0	11	1,187	1,215	−28	35.29

Source: Competitions

=== Greek Basket League ===
==== Regular season ====
===== Standings =====
Pos	Team	Pld	W	L	PF	PA	PD	Pts	Qualification or relegation
1	AEK	26	18	8	2129	1995	+134	44	Advanced to playoffs
2	Peristeri Vikos Cola	26	17	9	2009	1977	+32	43 (Note: Peristeri Vikos Cola and Panathinaikos OPAP finished tied with 43 points. The two clubs split their head to head season series 1–1. Peristeri won the head to head point differential in their two games against Panathinaikos OPAP by 3 points.)	Advanced to playoffs
3	Panathinaikos OPAP (Note: Panathinaikos OPAP did not receive a point for their forfeited loss to Kymi. As a punishment for forfeiting the game, Panathinaikos was deducted 6 points in the league standings.)	26	24	2	2151	1668	+483	43	Advanced to playoffs
4	Promitheas Patras	26	16	10	2003	1907	+96	42	Advanced to playoffs
5	PAOK	26	15	11	1992	1955	+37	41	Advanced to playoffs
6	Olympiacos (Note: Olympiacos did not receive a point for their forfeited loss to Panathinaikos OPAP. As a punishment, Olympiacos was deducted 8 points in the league standings.) (R)	26	23	3	2108	1708	+400	40	Advanced to playoffs
7	Ifaistos Limnou	26	13	13	1914	1995	−81	39	Advanced to playoffs
8	Holargos	26	12	14	1850	1899	−49	38	Advanced to playoffs
9	Aris	26	8	18	1811	1883	−72	34 (Note: Aris, Rethymno Cretan Kings, Panionios, and Kymi finished tied with 34 points. The tie breakers resulted with Aris in 9th place, Rethymno in 10th place, Panionios in 11th place, and Kymi in 12th place.)	
10	Rethymno Cretan Kings	26	8	18	1906	2053	−147	34	
11	Panionios	26	8	18	1950	2210	−260	34	
12	Kymi	26	8	18	1899	2100	−201	34	
13	Lavrio Aegean Cargo (R)	26	7	19	1997	2123	−126	33	Relegated to Greek A2 League
14	Kolossos H Hotels (R)	26	5	21	1958	2204	−246	31	Relegated to Greek A2 League

Source: ESAKE
(R) Relegated

===== Results overview =====
Opposition	Home score	Away score	Double
AEK Athens	77–81	73–81	150–162
Holargos	58–59	63–76	121–135
Ifaistos Limnou	65–54	64–73	129–127
Kolossos H Hotels	75–81	72–61	147–142
Kymi	95–60	57–75	152–135
Lavrio Aegean Cargo	84–70	73–70	157–140
Olympiacos	64–68	67–76	131–144
Panathinaikos OPAP	70–84	65–85	135–169
Panionios	79–56	66–70	145–126
PAOK	58–62	79–95	137–157
Peristeri Vikos Cola	62–68	61–81	123–149
Promitheas Patras	66–65	61–71	127–136
Rethymno Cretan Kings	81–87	76–74	157–161

===== Matches =====
7 October 2018 1	Lavrio Aegean Cargo	70–73	Aris Thessaloniki	Lavrio
18:00	Scoring by quarter: 24–21, 11–15, 16–15, 19–22
ERT	Pts: Doron Lamb, Milan Milošević 17; Rebs: Tai Odiase 6 Asts: Milan Milošević 3		Pts: Lucky Jones 15; Rebs: Gary McGhee 11; Asts: Dimitris Flionis, Lucky Jones 3	Arena: Lavrio Indoor Hall

13 October 2018 2	Aris Thessaloniki	70–84	Panathinaikos OPAP	Thessaloniki
18:00	Scoring by quarter: 17–22, 17–24, 19–21, 17–17
ERT	Pts: Lefteris Bochoridis, Gary Bell 11; Rebs: Gary McGhee 6 Asts: Lefteris Bochoridis 7		Pts: Deshaun Thomas 15; Rebs: Stéphane Lasme, Dinos Mitoglou 7 Asts: Lukas Lekavičius 6	Arena: Nick Galis Hall

21 October 2018 3	Panionios	70–66	Aris Thessaloniki	Nea Smyrni
17:00	Scoring by quarter: 24–22, 21–10, 13–17, 12–17
ERT	Pts: Davion Berry 17; Rebs: Darnell Harris 7 Asts: Nikos Diplaros 6		Pts: Lucky Jones, Gary Bell 11; Rebs: Ramon Harris 10; Asts: Lefteris Bochoridis 5	Arena: Nea Smyrni Indoor Hall

29 October 2018 4	Aris Thessaloniki	64–68	Olympiacos	Thessaloniki
17:00	Scoring by quarter: 12–25, 16–19, 19–12, 17–12
ERT	Pts: Lucky Jones 25; Rebs: Gary McGhee, Michale Kyser 6 Asts: Gary McGhee 3		Pts: Vassilis Spanoulis, Georgios Printezis 11; Rebs: Sasha Vezenkov 8 Asts: Vassilis Spanoulis 5	Arena: Nick Galis Hall

10 November 2018 5	Kolossos H Hotels	61–72	Aris Thessaloniki	Rhodes
15:45	Scoring by quarter: 16–15, 18–11, 13–21, 14–25
ERT	Pts: Dimitrios Mavroeidis 13; Rebs: Ivan Aska 8 Asts: Tyreek Duren 4		Pts: Lucky Jones 14; Rebs: Lucky Jones 8 Asts: Gary Bell 5	Arena: Venetokleio Indoor Hall

18 November 2018 6	Aris Thessaloniki	62–68	Peristeri Vikos Cola	Thessaloniki
17:00	Scoring by quarter: 14–18, 16–20, 13–18, 19–12
ERT	Pts: Ramon Harris 14; Rebs: Lefteris Bochoridis 8 Asts: Lucky Jones, Dimitrios Verginis 4		Pts: Ryan Harrow 20; Rebs: Panagiotis Vasilopoulos 9 Asts: Vassilis Mouratos 3	Arena: Nick Galis Hall

25 November 2018 7	PAOK	95–79	Aris Thessaloniki	Thessaloniki
17:30	Scoring by quarter: 28–18, 24–20, 24–23, 19–18
ERT	Pts: Phil Goss 23; Rebs: Darrius Garrett 6 Asts: Antonis Koniaris 4		Pts: Lefteris Bochoridis 15; Rebs: Gary McGhee 6 Asts: Boris Dallo 9	Arena: P.A.O.K. Sports Arena

8 December 2018 8	Aris Thessaloniki	77–81	AEK Athens	Thessaloniki
17:30	Scoring by quarter: 18–17, 15–22, 19–22, 25–20
ERT	Pts: Lefteris Bochoridis 24; Rebs: Lucky Jones, Gary McGhee 6 Asts: Gary Bell 5		Pts: Vince Hunter 16; Rebs: Vince Hunter, Tyler Roberson 8 Asts: Howard Sant-Roos 6	Arena: Nick Galis Hall

15 December 2018 9	Promitheas Patras	71–61	Aris Thessaloniki	Patra
17:30	Scoring by quarter: 15–13, 15–12, 21–6, 20–30
ERT	Pts: Rion Brown 14; Rebs: Rion Brown, Christos Saloustros 6 Asts: Langston Hall 3		Pts: Lefteris Bochoridis, Ramon Harris 11; Rebs: Gary McGhee 9 Asts: Lefteris Bochoridis, Boris Dallo 4	Arena: Dimitris Tofalos Arena

22 December 2018 10	Aris Thessaloniki	58–59	Holargos	Thessaloniki
17:30	Scoring by quarter: 22–10, 14–17, 8–15, 14–17
ERT	Pts: Gary Bell 14; Rebs: Diamantis Slaftsakis, Gary McGhee 6 Asts: Lefteris Bochoridis 4		Pts: Jermaine Love 14; Rebs: Danny Agbelese 8 Asts: (3 players) 6	Arena: Nick Galis Hall

29 December 2018 11	Kymi	75–57	Aris Thessaloniki	Chalkida
18:00	Scoring by quarter: 13–18, 13–17, 20–13, 29–9
ERT	Pts: Scott Suggs 16; Rebs: Chris Horton 7 Asts: JeQuan Lewis 11		Pts: Ramon Harris 14; Rebs: Gary McGhee 13; Asts: Lefteris Bochoridis, Lucky Jones 3	Arena: Tasos Kampouris Kanithou Indoor Hall

6 January 2019 12	Aris Thessaloniki	65–54	Ifaistos Limnou	Thessaloniki
17:00	Scoring by quarter: 26–20, 16–6, 14–17, 9–11
ERT	Pts: Gary Bell 16; Rebs: Gary McGhee 10; Asts: (3 players) 3		Pts: Toddrick Gotcher 16; Rebs: Sean Evans 11; Asts: Sean Evans 5	Arena: Nick Galis Hall

12 January 2019 13	Rethymno Cretan Kings	74–76	Aris Thessaloniki	Rethymno
15:30	Scoring by quarter: 18–18, 24–14, 15–19, 17–25
ERT	Pts: Antreas Christodoulou 23; Rebs: Travis Daniels 14; Asts: Elijah Johnson 6		Pts: Lefteris Bochoridis 17; Rebs: Gary McGhee 10; Asts: Lucky Jones 3	Arena: Melina Merkouri Indoor Hall

19 January 2019 14	Aris Thessaloniki	84–70	Lavrio Aegean Cargo	Thessaloniki
17:30	Scoring by quarter: 18–19, 18–18, 21–14, 27–19
ERT	Pts: Vassilis Toliopoulos 17; Rebs: Gary McGhee 13; Asts: Lefteris Bochoridis, Dimitris Flionis 3		Pts: Zamal Nixon 16; Rebs: Ioannis Kouzeloglou 11; Asts: Zamal Nixon 5	Arena: Nick Galis Hall

28 January 2019 15	Panathinaikos OPAP	85–65	Aris Thessaloniki	Athens
19:00	Scoring by quarter: 18–18, 24–14, 15–19, 17–25
COSMOTE SPORT	Pts: Nick Calathes 18; Rebs: Deshaun Thomas, James Gist 8 Asts: Nick Calathes 10		Pts: Ramon Harris 11; Rebs: Boris Dallo 6 Asts: Lefteris Bochoridis 4	Arena: O.A.C.A. Olympic Indoor Hall

2 February 2019 16	Aris Thessaloniki	79–56	Panionios	Thessaloniki
15:45	Scoring by quarter: 30–24, 23–14, 7–13, 19–5
ERT	Pts: Lefteris Bochoridis 15; Rebs: Michale Kyser 9 Asts: Dimitris Flionis 7		Pts: Nondas Papantoniou 13; Rebs: Demetric Austin 10; Asts: (3 players) 2	Arena: Nick Galis Hall

4 March 2019 17	Olympiacos	76–67	Aris Thessaloniki	Piraeus
18:30	Scoring by quarter: 21–16, 27–20, 17–13, 11–18
COSMOTE SPORT	Pts: Axel Toupane 17; Rebs: Nikola Milutinov 9 Asts: Brianté Weber 13		Pts: Lefteris Bochoridis 13; Rebs: Michale Kyser 5 Asts: Vassilis Toliopoulos 4	Arena: Peace and Friendship Stadium

9 March 2019 18	Aris Thessaloniki	75–81	Kolossos H Hotels	Thessaloniki
15:45	Scoring by quarter: 19–17, 24–15, 19–25, 13–24
ERT	Pts: Vassilis Toliopoulos 15; Rebs: Gary McGhee 6 Asts: Boris Dallo 4		Pts: Slaven Čupković 22; Rebs: JayVaughn Pinkston 8 Asts: Tre Demps 4	Arena: Nick Galis Hall

16 March 2019 19	Peristeri Vikos Cola	81–61	Aris Thessaloniki	Athens
18:00	Scoring by quarter: 26–17, 18–11, 15–18, 22–15
ERT	Pts: Steven Gray 17; Rebs: (3 players) 4 Asts: Ryan Harrow 8		Pts: Lefteris Bochoridis 18; Rebs: Gary McGhee 8 Asts: Lefteris Bochoridis, Boris Dallo 4	Arena: Peristeri Indoor Hall Andreas Papandreou

23 March 2019 20	Aris Thessaloniki	58–62	PAOK	Thessaloniki
18:00	Scoring by quarter: 11–19, 20–21, 14–6, 13–16
ERT	Pts: Vassilis Toliopoulos 13; Rebs: Gary McGhee 10; Asts: Boris Dallo 5		Pts: Will Hatcher 11; Rebs: Vangelis Margaritis 7 Asts: Will Hatcher, Vangelis Margaritis 4	Arena: Nick Galis Hall

30 March 2019 21	AEK Athens	81–73	Aris Thessaloniki	Athens
17:00	Scoring by quarter: 21–14, 22–23, 17–18, 21–18
COSMOTE SPORT	Pts: Giannoulis Larentzakis 21; Rebs: Dušan Šakota 8 Asts: Delroy James, Malcolm Griffin 4		Pts: Gary McGhee 23; Rebs: Gary McGhee 11; Asts: Ramon Harris 3	Arena: O.A.C.A. Olympic Indoor Hall

6 April 2019 22	Aris Thessaloniki	66–65(OT)	Promitheas Patras	Thessaloniki
15:45	Scoring by quarter: 9–17, 20–21, 16–14, 15–8, Overtime: 6–4
ERT	Pts: Lucky Jones 20; Rebs: Michale Kyser, Boris Dallo 7 Asts: Boris Dallo 6		Pts: Rion Brown 20; Rebs: Octavius Ellis 10; Asts: Nikos Gkikas 5	Arena: Nick Galis Hall

10 April 2019 23	Holargos	76–63	Aris Thessaloniki	Athens
15:45	Scoring by quarter: 15–21, 17–14, 18–12, 26–16
ERT	Pts: Vlado Janković 16; Rebs: Vlado Janković 7 Asts: Gary Talton 7		Pts: Lucky Jones 19; Rebs: Gary McGhee 7 Asts: Lefteris Bochoridis 3	Arena: Antonis Tritsis Indoor Hall

13 April 2019 24	Aris Thessaloniki	95–60	Kymi	Thessaloniki
15:45	Scoring by quarter: 26–2, 23–16, 25–18, 21–24
ERT	Pts: Lefteris Bochoridis 21; Rebs: Gary McGhee 10; Asts: Lefteris Bochoridis 6		Pts: Vaidas Kariniauskas 16; Rebs: Chris Horton 10; Asts: Vaidas Kariniauskas 6	Arena: Nick Galis Hall

20 April 2019 25	Ifaistos Limnou	73–64	Aris Thessaloniki	Lemnos
16:45	Scoring by quarter: 18–12, 13–18, 21–14, 21–20
ERT	Pts: Rolands Freimanis 23; Rebs: Sean Evans 13; Asts: Tyrone Brazelton 4		Pts: Lucky Jones 13; Rebs: Boris Dallo 9 Asts: Lucky Jones 6	Arena: Kleisto Gimnastirio Limnou Nikos Samaras

8 May 2019 26	Aris Thessaloniki	81–87	Rethymno Cretan Kings	Thessaloniki
17:30	Scoring by quarter: 16–17, 21–18, 16–27, 28–25
ERT	Pts: Vassilis Toliopoulos 24; Rebs: Gary McGhee 9 Asts: Vassilis Toliopoulos, Diamantis Slaftsakis 4		Pts: Steve Burtt Jr. 32; Rebs: Keith Clanton 12; Asts: Anthony Hickey 7	Arena: Nick Galis Hall

=== Greek Cup ===
==== Phase 2 ====
3 October 2018 Phase 2	Promitheas Patras	86–65	Aris Thessaloniki	Patras
19:00	Scoring by quarter: 26-19, 21-17, 14-11, 25-18
	Pts: Nikos Gkikas 16; Rebs: Oleksandr Lypovyy 6 Asts: Christos Saloustros, Dimitrios Katsivelis 3	(in Greek)	Pts: Dimitrios Verginis 15; Rebs: Lucky Jones 6 Asts: Dimitrios Verginis 3	Arena: Dimitris Tofalos Arena

=== Basketball Champions League ===
==== First qualifying round ====
20 September 2018 1st Leg	BC Dinamo Tbilisi (Georgia (country))	64–90 (Series: 64-90)	(Greece) Aris Thessaloniki	Tbilisi
18:00	Scoring by quarter: 15-24, 20-23, 13-20, 16-23
	Pts: (4 players) 9 Rebs: Domagoj Bubalo 7 Asts: Reger Dowell 4		Pts: Lefteris Bochoridis 18; Rebs: Michale Kyser 8 Asts: Boris Dallo 5	Arena: Tbilisi Sports Palace

22 September 2018 2nd Leg	Aris Thessaloniki (Greece)	92–54 (Series: 182-118)	(Georgia (country)) BC Dinamo Tbilisi	Thessaloniki
19:00	Scoring by quarter: 26-16, 23-16, 23-8, 20-14
	Pts: Ramon Harris 14; Rebs: Michale Kyser 8 Asts: Dimitris Flionis, Boris Dallo 5		Pts: Reger Dowell 14; Rebs: Domagoj Bubalo 10; Asts: (3 players) 2	Arena: Nick Galis Hall

==== Second qualifying round ====
25 September 2018 1st Leg	Nizhny Novgorod (Russia)	63–65 (Series: 63-65)	(Greece) Aris Thessaloniki	Nizhny Novgorod
19:00	Scoring by quarter: 11-19, 11-14, 18-18, 23-14
	Pts: Kendrick Perry 24; Rebs: Rod Odom 7 Asts: Kendrick Perry 7		Pts: Gary Bell 17; Rebs: Gary McGhee 11; Asts: Dimitris Flionis, Boris Dallo 3	Arena: Trade Union Sport Palace

28 September 2018 2nd Leg	Aris Thessaloniki (Greece)	51–62 (Series: 116-125)	(Russia) Nizhny Novgorod	Thessaloniki
19:30	Scoring by quarter: 11-20, 7-14, 25-13, 8-15
	Pts: Lucky Jones 15; Rebs: Boris Dallo 7 Asts: Boris Dallo 2		Pts: Kendrick Perry 16; Rebs: Kendrick Perry 9 Asts: Kendrick Perry 6	Arena: Nick Galis Hall

=== FIBA Europe Cup ===
==== Regular season ====
===== Group table =====
Pos	Team	Pld	W	L	PF	PA	PD	Pts	Qualification
1	(Bulgaria) Levski Lukoil	6	5	1	520	465	+55	11	Advance to second round
2	(Finland) Kataja	6	3	3	497	510	−13	9	Advance to second round
3	(Greece) Aris	6	3	3	444	432	+12	9	
4	(Ukraine) Dnipro	6	1	5	407	461	−54	7	

Source: FIBA Europe Cup

===== Results overview =====
Opposition	Home score	Away score	Double
(Ukraine) Dnipro	86–61	55–51	141–112
(Finland) Kataja	70–79	86–88	156–167
(Bulgaria) Levski Lukoil	81–76	66–77	147–153

===== Matches =====
17 October 2018 1	Aris Thessaloniki (Greece)	70–79	(Finland) Kataja	Thessaloniki
19:00	Scoring by quarter: 29–16, 13–26, 11–16, 17–21
	Pts: Gary Bell 18; Rebs: (3 players) 6 Asts: Boris Dallo 5		Pts: Vincent Simpson 13; Rebs: Samuli Vanttaja, Daniel Mullings 7 Asts: Vincent Simpson 7	Arena: Nick Galis Hall

24 October 2018 2	Dnipro (Ukraine)	51–55	(Greece) Aris Thessaloniki	Dnipro
19:00	Scoring by quarter: 22–15, 11–13, 11–14, 7–13
	Pts: Maksym Zakudaiev 17; Rebs: Oleksandr Kushnirov 8 Asts: Anatoliy Shundel, Andrii Kozhemiakin 4		Pts: Lefteris Bochoridis 16; Rebs: Lefteris Bochoridis, Gary McGhee 9 Asts: Dimitris Flionis 5	Arena: Palace of Sports Shynnik

31 October 2018 3	Levski Lukoil (Bulgaria)	77–66	(Greece) Aris Thessaloniki	Sofia
19:00	Scoring by quarter: 24–12, 24–29, 17–13, 12–12
	Pts: Patrick Rembert 16; Rebs: Patrick Rembert, Dejan Ivanov 7 Asts: Patrick Rembert 5		Pts: Gary Bell 16; Rebs: Michale Kyser, Gary McGhee 8 Asts: Lefteris Bochoridis 6	Arena: Universiada Hall

7 November 2018 4	Kataja (Finland)	88–86	(Greece) Aris Thessaloniki	Joensuu
18:30	Scoring by quarter: 16–26, 19–20, 20–16, 33–24
	Pts: Vincent Simpson 31; Rebs: Daniel Mullings 10; Asts: Ilari Seppälä 5		Pts: Gary Bell 28; Rebs: Gary McGhee 10; Asts: Boris Dallo 5	Arena: Joensuu Areena

14 November 2018 5	Aris Thessaloniki (Greece)	86–61	(Ukraine) Dnipro	Thessaloniki
19:00	Scoring by quarter: 24–12, 19–14, 32–26, 11–9
	Pts: Lucky Jones 19; Rebs: Gary McGhee 8 Asts: Boris Dallo, Ramon Harris 5		Pts: Stanislav Tymofeyenko, Maksym Zakudaiev 14; Rebs: Stanislav Tymofeyenko 5 Asts: Olexandr Mishula 4	Arena: Nick Galis Hall

21 November 2018 6	Aris Thessaloniki (Greece)	81–76	(Bulgaria) Levski Lukoil	Thessaloniki
19:00	Scoring by quarter: 24–26, 22–17, 13–11, 22–22
	Pts: Lucky Jones 19; Rebs: Diamantis Slaftsakis, Gary McGhee 5 Asts: Dimitris Flionis 5		Pts: Dejan Ivanov 19; Rebs: Nikola Maravić, Dejan Ivanov 10; Asts: Patrick Rembert 9	Arena: Nick Galis Hall

== Players' statistics ==
=== Basket League ===
#	Player	GP	PTS	PPG	TR	RPG	DR	OR	AST	APG	STL	SPG	BLK	BPG
0	(United States) Lucky Jones	26	284	10.92	91	3.50	62	29	54	2.08	26	1.00	1	0.04
1	(United States) Michale Kyser	26	150	5.77	99	3.81	51	48	9	0.35	15	0.58	20	0.77
2	(Greece) Vassilis Toliopoulos	15	116	7.73	22	1.47	20	2	22	1.47	8	0.53	0	0.00
3	(Greece) Dimitrios Verginis	18	46	2.56	8	0.44	8	0	12	0.67	5	0.28	0	0.00
4	(Greece) Lefteris Bochoridis	23	263	11.43	91	3.96	71	20	59	2.57	16	0.70	5	0.22
5	(Greece) Kostas Vlasios	0	0	0.00	0	0.00	0	0	0	0.00	0	0.00	0	0.00
7	(Greece) Dimitris Flionis	26	121	4.65	42	1.62	33	9	41	1.58	36	1.38	1	0.04
10	(United States) Gary Bell	23	187	8.13	38	1.65	29	9	28	1.22	12	0.52	1	0.04
11	(Greece) Stratos Voulgaropoulos	1	0	0.00	0	0.00	0	0	0	0.00	0	0.00	0	0.00
12	(France) Boris Dallo	26	142	5.46	90	3.46	65	25	66	2.54	13	0.50	0	0.00
13	(Greece) Valantis Kourtidis	0	0	0.00	0	0.00	0	0	0	0.00	0	0.00	0	0.00
14	(Greece) Vassilis Christidis	20	36	1.80	23	1.15	14	9	5	0.25	6	0.30	5	0.25
15	(Greece) Diamantis Slaftsakis	26	95	3.65	56	2.15	39	17	27	1.04	15	0.58	6	0.23
16	(United States) Gary McGhee	26	196	7.54	180	6.92	104	76	19	0.73	12	0.46	14	0.54
22	(United States) Ramon Harris	25	158	6.32	105	4.20	85	20	25	1.00	35	1.40	6	0.24
23	(Greece) Giorgos Angelou	9	17	1.89	5	0.56	4	1	2	0.22	2	0.22	0	0.00
	Team totals	26	1811	69.65	850	32.69	585	265	369	14.19	201	7.73	59	2.27

==== Shooting ====
#	Player	GP	FTM	FTA	FT%	2PM	2PA	2P%	3PM	3PA	3P%
0	(United States) Lucky Jones	26	86	117	73.50	51	136	37.50	32	96	33.33
1	(United States) Michale Kyser	26	15	36	41.67	63	125	50.40	3	6	50.00
2	(Greece) Vassilis Toliopoulos	15	13	18	72.22	11	27	40.74	27	79	34.18
3	(Greece) Dimitrios Verginis	18	12	18	66.67	2	14	14.29	10	36	27.78
4	(Greece) Lefteris Bochoridis	23	44	69	63.77	66	141	46.81	29	96	30.21
5	(Greece) Kostas Vlasios	0	0	0	0.00	0	0	0.00	0	0	0.00
7	(Greece) Dimitris Flionis	26	10	13	76.92	27	58	46.55	19	62	30.65
10	(United States) Gary Bell	23	26	31	83.87	31	80	38.75	33	98	33.67
11	(Greece) Stratos Voulgaropoulos	1	0	0	0.00	0	0	0.00	0	0	0.00
12	(France) Boris Dallo	26	27	38	71.05	32	77	41.56	17	57	29.82
13	(Greece) Valantis Kourtidis	0	0	0	0.00	0	0	0.00	0	0	0.00
14	(Greece) Vassilis Christidis	20	5	15	33.33	14	22	63.64	1	6	16.67
15	(Greece) Diamantis Slaftsakis	26	14	25	56.00	33	63	52.38	5	25	20.00
16	(United States) Gary McGhee	26	48	109	44.04	74	132	56.06	0	0	0.00
22	(United States) Ramon Harris	25	11	24	45.83	21	47	44.68	35	103	33.98
23	(Greece) Giorgos Angelou	9	0	0	0.00	1	4	25.00	5	13	38.46
	Team totals	26	311	513	60.62	426	926	46.00	216	677	31.91

Last updated: 8 May 2019
Source: ESAKE

=== Greek Cup ===
#	Player	GP	PTS	PPG	TR	RPG	DR	OR	AST	APG	STL	SPG	BLK	BPG
0	(United States) Lucky Jones	1	6	6.00	6	6.00	3	3	0	0.00	1	1.00	0	0.00
1	(United States) Michale Kyser	1	4	4.00	5	5.00	3	2	1	1.00	0	0.00	1	1.00
2	(Greece) Vassilis Toliopoulos	0	0	0.00	0	0.00	0	0	0	0.00	0	0.00	0	0.00
3	(Greece) Dimitrios Verginis	1	15	15.00	2	2.00	1	1	3	3.00	2	2.00	0	0.00
4	(Greece) Lefteris Bochoridis	1	10	10.00	3	3.00	1	2	1	1.00	1	1.00	0	0.00
5	(Greece) Kostas Vlasios	0	0	0.00	0	0.00	0	0	0	0.00	0	0.00	0	0.00
7	(Greece) Dimitris Flionis	1	1	1.00	1	1.00	0	1	0	0.00	0	0.00	0	0.00
10	(United States) Gary Bell	1	0	0.00	1	1.00	1	0	0	0.00	0	0.00	0	0.00
11	(Greece) Stratos Voulgaropoulos	0	0	0.00	0	0.00	0	0	0	0.00	0	0.00	0	0.00
12	(France) Boris Dallo	1	2	2.00	2	2.00	2	0	1	1.00	1	1.00	0	0.00
13	(Greece) Valantis Kourtidis	0	0	0.00	0	0.00	0	0	0	0.00	0	0.00	0	0.00
14	(Greece) Vassilis Christidis	1	5	5.00	1	1.00	1	0	0	0.00	2	2.00	0	0.00
15	(Greece) Diamantis Slaftsakis	1	11	11.00	3	3.00	2	1	0	0.00	1	1.00	1	1.00
16	(United States) Gary McGhee	1	3	3.00	2	2.00	2	0	0	0.00	0	0.00	0	0.00
22	(United States) Ramon Harris	1	5	5.00	3	3.00	1	2	0	0.00	2	2.00	1	1.00
23	(Greece) Giorgos Angelou	1	3	3.00	5	5.00	2	3	1	1.00	0	0.00	0	0.00
	Team totals	1	65	65.00	34	34.00	19	15	7	7.00	10	10.00	3	3.00

==== Shooting ====
#	Player	GP	FTM	FTA	FT%	2PM	2PA	2P%	3PM	3PA	3P%
0	(United States) Lucky Jones	1	0	2	0.00	3	5	60.00	0	3	0.00
1	(United States) Michale Kyser	1	0	1	0.00	2	5	40.00	0	0	0.00
2	(Greece) Vassilis Toliopoulos	0	0	0	0.00	0	0	0.00	0	0	0.00
3	(Greece) Dimitrios Verginis	1	3	4	75.00	6	7	85.71	0	3	0.00
4	(Greece) Lefteris Bochoridis	1	4	7	57.14	3	4	75.00	0	1	0.00
5	(Greece) Kostas Vlasios	0	0	0	0.00	0	0	0.00	0	0	0.00
7	(Greece) Dimitris Flionis	1	1	2	50.00	0	0	0.00	0	0	0.00
10	(United States) Gary Bell	1	0	0	0.00	0	0	0.00	0	3	0.00
11	(Greece) Stratos Voulgaropoulos	0	0	0	0.00	0	0	0.00	0	0	0.00
12	(France) Boris Dallo	1	0	0	0.00	1	2	50.00	0	2	0.00
13	(Greece) Valantis Kourtidis	0	0	0	0.00	0	0	0.00	0	0	0.00
14	(Greece) Vassilis Christidis	1	2	2	100.00	0	2	0.00	1	1	100.00
15	(Greece) Diamantis Slaftsakis	1	5	5	100.00	3	3	100.00	0	0	0.00
16	(United States) Gary McGhee	1	1	2	50.00	1	2	50.00	0	0	0.00
22	(United States) Ramon Harris	1	0	0	0.00	1	4	25.00	1	6	16.67
23	(Greece) Giorgos Angelou	1	0	0	0.00	0	3	0.00	1	5	20.00
	Team totals	1	16	25	64.00	20	37	54.05	3	24	12.50

Last updated: 3 October 2018
Source: gazzetta.gr(in Greek)

=== Basketball Champions League ===
#	Player	GP	PTS	PPG	TR	RPG	DR	OR	AST	APG	STL	SPG	BLK	BPG
0	(United States) Lucky Jones	4	46	11.50	20	5.00	17	3	5	1.25	4	1.00	0	0.00
1	(United States) Michale Kyser	4	22	5.50	24	6.00	15	9	0	0.00	1	0.25	6	1.50
2	(Greece) Vassilis Toliopoulos	0	0	0.00	0	0.00	0	0	0	0.00	0	0.00	0	0.00
3	(Greece) Dimitrios Verginis	2	7	3.50	2	1.00	0	2	3	1.50	2	1.00	0	0.00
4	(Greece) Lefteris Bochoridis	4	41	10.25	9	2.25	8	1	6	1.50	8	2.00	0	0.00
5	(Greece) Kostas Vlasios	0	0	0.00	0	0.00	0	0	0	0.00	0	0.00	0	0.00
7	(Greece) Dimitris Flionis	4	8	2.00	6	1.50	5	1	10	2.50	3	0.75	0	0.00
10	(United States) Gary Bell	4	49	12.25	10	2.50	7	3	4	1.00	4	1.00	0	0.00
11	(Greece) Stratos Voulgaropoulos	0	0	0.00	0	0.00	0	0	0	0.00	0	0.00	0	0.00
12	(France) Boris Dallo	4	38	8.00	20	5.00	15	5	15	3.75	4	1.00	0	0.00
13	(Greece) Valantis Kourtidis	0	0	0.00	0	0.00	0	0	0	0.00	0	0.00	0	0.00
14	(Greece) Vassilis Christidis	3	4	1.33	6	2.00	2	4	1	0.33	0	0.00	1	0.33
15	(Greece) Diamantis Slaftsakis	4	8	2.00	7	1.75	6	1	4	1.00	3	0.75	3	0.75
16	(United States) Gary McGhee	4	31	7.75	24	6.00	14	10	5	1.25	2	0.50	4	1.00
22	(United States) Ramon Harris	4	33	8.25	14	3.50	9	5	5	1.25	4	1.00	4	1.00
23	(Greece) Giorgos Angelou	4	17	4.25	6	1.50	4	2	3	0.75	1	0.25	0	0.00
	Team				17		7	10						
	Team totals	4	298	74.50	165	41.25	109	56	61	15.25	36	9.00	18	4.50

==== Shooting ====
#	Player	GP	FTM	FTA	FT%	2PM	2PA	2P%	3PM	3PA	3P%
0	(United States) Lucky Jones	4	10	18	55.56	6	13	46.15	8	19	42.11
1	(United States) Michale Kyser	4	2	7	28.57	10	15	66.67	0	0	0.00
2	(Greece) Vassilis Toliopoulos	0	0	0	0.00	0	0	0.00	0	0	0.00
3	(Greece) Dimitrios Verginis	2	0	1	0.00	2	3	66.67	1	6	16.67
4	(Greece) Lefteris Bochoridis	4	9	14	64.29	7	17	41.18	6	16	37.50
5	(Greece) Kostas Vlasios	0	0	0	0.00	0	0	0.00	0	0	0.00
7	(Greece) Dimitris Flionis	4	2	4	50.00	0	4	0.00	2	6	33.33
10	(United States) Gary Bell	4	6	7	85.71	11	19	57.89	7	18	38.89
11	(Greece) Stratos Voulgaropoulos	0	0	0	0.00	0	0	0.00	0	0	0.00
12	(France) Boris Dallo	4	6	8	75.00	7	21	33.33	4	10	40.00
13	(Greece) Valantis Kourtidis	0	0	0	0.00	0	0	0.00	0	0	0.00
14	(Greece) Vassilis Christidis	3	0	2	0.00	2	7	28.57	0	0	0.00
15	(Greece) Diamantis Slaftsakis	4	0	0	0.00	4	10	40.00	0	3	0.00
16	(United States) Gary McGhee	4	15	35	42.86	8	15	53.33	0	0	0.00
22	(United States) Ramon Harris	4	1	5	20.00	4	8	50.00	8	14	57.14
23	(Greece) Giorgos Angelou	4	2	5	40.00	0	2	0.00	5	8	62.50
	Team totals	4	53	106	50.00	61	134	45.52	41	100	41.00

Last updated: 28 September 2018
Source: www.championsleague.basketball

=== FIBA Europe Cup ===
#	Player	GP	PTS	PPG	TR	RPG	DR	OR	AST	APG	STL	SPG	BLK	BPG
0	(United States) Lucky Jones	6	69	11.50	22	3.67	14	8	13	2.17	8	1.33	1	0.17
1	(United States) Michale Kyser	6	40	6.67	25	4.17	20	5	7	1.17	2	0.33	7	1.17
2	(Greece) Vassilis Toliopoulos	0	0	0.00	0	0.00	0	0	0	0.00	0	0.00	0	0.00
3	(Greece) Dimitrios Verginis	5	20	4.00	11	2.20	8	3	9	1.80	7	1.40	0	0.00
4	(Greece) Lefteris Bochoridis	5	50	10.00	18	3.60	11	7	13	2.60	7	1.40	1	0.20
5	(Greece) Kostas Vlasios	0	0	0.00	0	0.00	0	0	0	0.00	0	0.00	0	0.00
7	(Greece) Dimitris Flionis	6	26	4.33	13	2.17	8	5	19	3.17	7	1.17	2	0.33
10	(United States) Gary Bell	4	76	19.00	6	1.50	3	3	5	1.25	5	1.25	0	0.00
11	(Greece) Stratos Voulgaropoulos	1	0	0.00	1	1.00	0	1	0	0.00	0	0.00	0	0.00
12	(France) Boris Dallo	6	44	7.33	23	3.83	15	8	24	4.00	6	1.00	0	0.00
13	(Greece) Valantis Kourtidis	1	0	0.00	0	0.00	0	0	0	0.00	0	0.00	0	0.00
14	(Greece) Vassilis Christidis	3	9	3.00	7	2.33	5	2	0	0.00	2	0.67	0	0.00
15	(Greece) Diamantis Slaftsakis	6	12	2.00	11	1.83	9	2	3	0.50	3	0.50	4	0.67
16	(United States) Gary McGhee	6	49	8.17	46	7.67	23	23	3	0.50	5	0.83	2	0.33
22	(United States) Ramon Harris	6	32	5.33	28	4.67	24	4	13	2.17	5	0.83	2	0.33
23	(Greece) Giorgos Angelou	4	17	4.25	2	0.50	2	0	5	1.25	1	0.25	1	0.25
	Team				24		10	14						
	Team totals	6	444	74.00	237	39.50	152	85	114	19.00	58	9.67	20	3.33

==== Shooting ====
#	Player	GP	FTM	FTA	FT%	2PM	2PA	2P%	3PM	3PA	3P%
0	(United States) Lucky Jones	6	17	25	68.00	8	25	32.00	12	29	41.38
1	(United States) Michale Kyser	6	3	7	42.86	17	33	51.52	1	3	33.33
2	(Greece) Vassilis Toliopoulos	0	0	0	0.00	0	0	0.00	0	0	0.00
3	(Greece) Dimitrios Verginis	5	4	6	66.67	5	14	35.71	2	9	22.22
4	(Greece) Lefteris Bochoridis	5	5	9	55.56	15	35	42.86	5	22	22.73
5	(Greece) Kostas Vlasios	0	0	0	0.00	0	0	0.00	0	0	0.00
7	(Greece) Dimitris Flionis	6	3	6	50.00	7	14	50.00	3	10	30.00
10	(United States) Gary Bell	4	18	21	85.71	14	24	58.33	10	25	40.00
11	(Greece) Stratos Voulgaropoulos	1	0	0	0.00	0	1	0.00	0	0	0.00
12	(France) Boris Dallo	6	6	8	75.00	7	12	58.33	8	15	53.33
13	(Greece) Valantis Kourtidis	1	0	0	0.00	0	0	0.00	0	1	0.00
14	(Greece) Vassilis Christidis	3	1	2	50.00	4	8	50.00	0	2	0.00
15	(Greece) Diamantis Slaftsakis	6	1	7	14.29	4	11	36.36	1	1	100.00
16	(United States) Gary McGhee	4	7	18	38.89	21	31	67.74	0	1	0.00
22	(United States) Ramon Harris	4	1	4	25.00	5	15	33.33	7	23	30.43
23	(Greece) Giorgos Angelou	4	0	0	0.00	1	4	25.00	5	14	35.71
	Team totals	6	66	113	58.41	108	227	47.58	54	155	34.84

Last updated: 21 November 2018
Source: www.fiba.basketball/europecup

=== Double-Double ===
#	Player	1st Statistical Category		2nd Statistical Category		Opponent	Competition	Date
1	(United States) Gary McGhee	Points	16	Rebounds	10	Kataja	FIBA Europe Cup	7 November 2018
2	(United States) Gary McGhee (2)	Points	11	Rebounds	10	Ifaistos Limnou	Basket League	6 January 2019
3	(United States) Gary McGhee (3)	Points	13	Rebounds	10	Rethymno Cretan Kings	Basket League	12 January 2019
4	(United States) Gary McGhee (4)	Points	13	Rebounds	13	Lavrio Aegean Cargo	Basket League	19 January 2019
5	(United States) Gary McGhee (5)	Points	23	Rebounds	11	AEK Athens	Basket League	30 March 2019
