= Gary Bell =

Gary Bell may refer to:

- Gary Bell (baseball) (born 1936), American Major League Baseball pitcher
- Gary Bell (footballer) (born 1947), English footballer
- Gary Bell Jr. (born 1992), American basketball player
