= Michale Kyser =

American basketball player (born 1991)

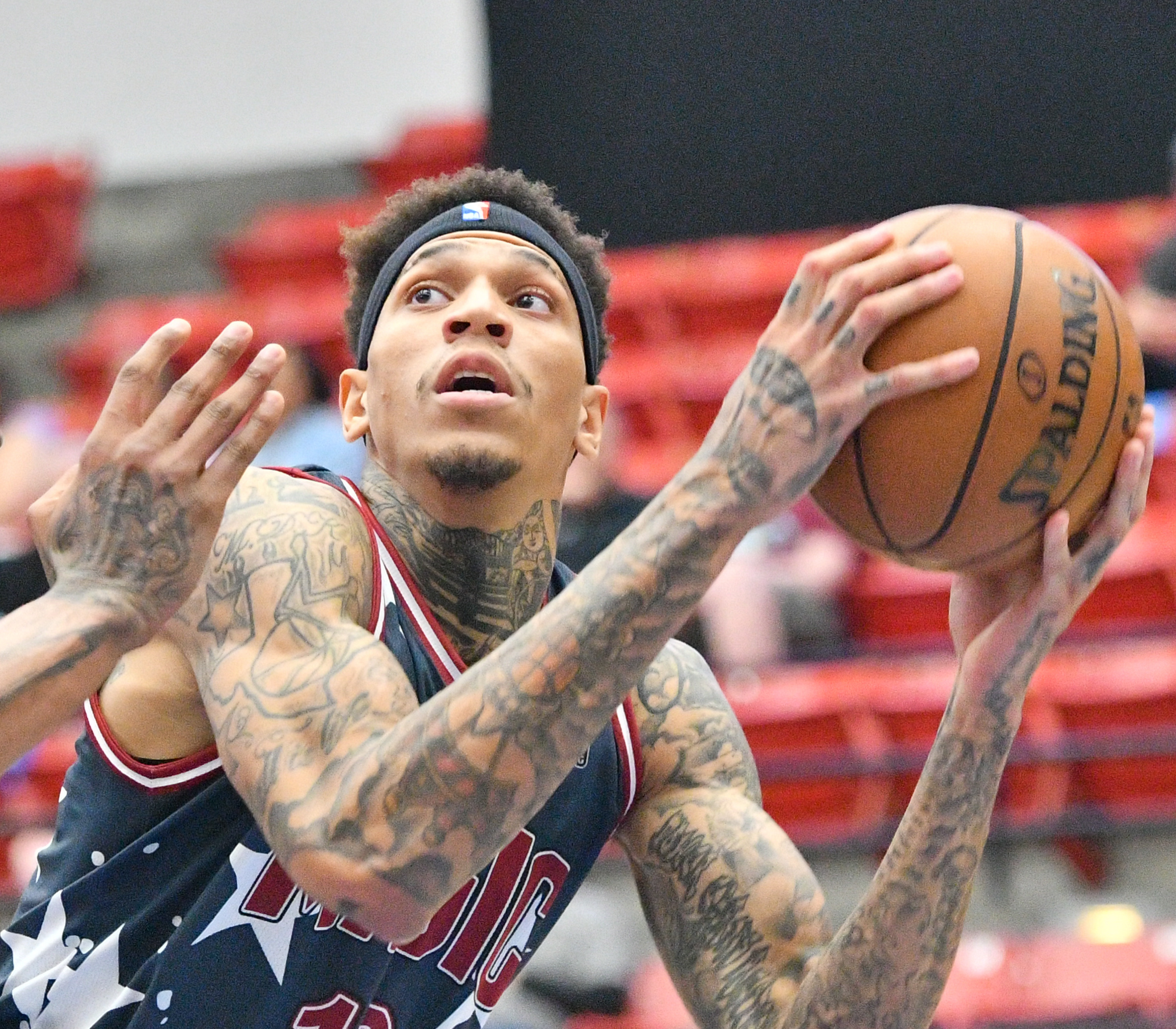
- Kyser in 2022

No. 12 – EWE Baskets Oldenburg
- Position: Power forward / Center
- League: Basketball Bundesliga

Personal information
- Born: November 26, 1991 (age 34) Victoria, Texas, U.S.
- Listed height: 6 ft 10 in (2.08 m)
- Listed weight: 220 lb (100 kg)

Career information
- High school: Lancaster (Lancaster, Texas); Christian Life Center Academy (Humble, Texas)
- College: Louisiana Tech (2011–2015)
- NBA draft: 2015: undrafted
- Playing career: 2015–present

Career history
- 2015–2016: Raptors 905
- 2016–2017: Salt Lake City Stars
- 2017: Enosis Neon Paralimni
- 2017–2018: Kymis
- 2018–2019: Aris Thessaloniki
- 2019: Guelph Nighthawks
- 2019–2020: Lakeland Magic
- 2020: Guelph Nighthawks
- 2020–2021: VEF Rīga
- 2021–2022: Hapoel Holon
- 2022–2023: Surne Bilbao Basket
- 2023–2024: Samsunspor
- 2024: Wilki Morskie Szczecin
- 2024–2025: Hapoel Holon
- 2025–present: EWE Baskets Oldenburg

Career highlights
- Israeli League champion (2022); Latvian League champion (2021); Latvian Estonian League Player of the Year (2021); All-Champions League Second Team (2021); Champions League rebounding leader (2021); Greek League blocks leader (2018); All-Greek League Second Team (2018); All-Greek League Defensive Team (2018); 2× All-C-USA Defensive Team (2014, 2015); All-WAC Defensive Team (2013)
- Stats at Basketball Reference

Michale De’Vonta Kyser (born November 26, 1991) is an American professional basketball player for EWE Baskets Oldenburg in the Basketball Bundesliga (BBL). He played college basketball for Louisiana Tech.

== Early life ==
Kyser was born in Victoria, Texas. He is the son of Myshell Kyser.

He played high school basketball for Lancaster High School, in Lancaster, Texas, for whom he averaged 12 points, 10 rebounds, and six blocks per game and was named first team all-District 15-4A, and for one year at Christian Life Center Academy in Humble, Texas, for whom he averaged 15 points, 11 rebounds, and six blocks per game.

== College career ==
Kyser played for the Louisiana Tech Bulldogs. In 2011–12, while averaging 13.5 minutes points per game, he averaged 3.7 points, 2.6 rebounds, and 1.8 blocks (2nd in the Western Athletic Conference (WAC)) per game. In 2012–13, while averaging 19.3 minutes per game, he averaged 5.0 points, 5.3 rebounds, and 2.7 blocks (leading the conference, and 15th in the NCAA) per game, and was named WAC All-Defense.

In 2013–14, while averaging 23.3 minutes per game, he averaged 7.0 points, 6.6 rebounds, and 2.0 blocks (leading Conference USA (CUSA), and 5th in the NCAA), with a .571 field goal percentage (9th in the conference), and was named CUSA All-Defense.

In his senior year in 2014–15, Kyser while averaging 28.4 minutes per game, he averaged 8.6 points, 6.6 rebounds, and 2.8 blocks (2nd in the conference, and 12th in the NCAA), with a .605 field goal percentage (2nd in the conference), and was named CUSA All-Defense. He led Louisiana Tech to the National Invitation Tournament quarterfinals, where they lost to Temple. He also helped the team win the conference regular season championship in 2013, 2014, and 2015. In the 2014–15 season, he became the all-time career blocks leader at Louisiana Tech.

== Professional career ==
=== 2015-19 ===
After going undrafted in the 2015 NBA draft, Kyser joined the Toronto Raptors for the 2015 NBA Summer League. He appeared in four games playing for the Raptors in Las Vegas and averaged 3.5 points and 4.0 rebounds in 14.6 minutes per game. On July 23, 2015, he signed with the Raptors, only to be waived by the team on October 24 after appearing in one preseason game. On October 31, he signed with the Raptors 905 as an affiliate player.

On August 30, 2016, Kyser signed with Tadamon Zouk of the Lebanese Basketball League, however, he left the team before playing for them and signed with the Salt Lake City Stars on November 25. The next day, he made his debut for the Stars in a 117–84 loss to the Texas Legends, recording eight points, two rebounds, and one assist in 15 minutes off the bench. On March 3, 2017, Kyser was waived by the Stars.

On September 23, 2017, Kyser joined Enosis Neon Paralimni of the Cypriot League where he would average 15 points, 14 rebounds and 3 blocks per game.

On November 29, 2017, he left Enosis in order to join Kymis of the Greek Basket League. During the season, he led the league in blocks with 1.9 blocks per game, while also averaging 6.9 points and 5.0 rebounds in 15.5 minutes per game with a 62.4% field goal percentage. He subsequently spent the 2018–19 season with Greek club Aris Thessaloniki. During the season, he was 10th in the league with 0.8 blocks per game, while also averaging 5.8 points and 3.8 rebounds in 17.3 minutes per game with a 50.4% field goal percentage. In July 2019, Kyser signed with the Guelph Nighthawks of the Canadian Elite Basketball League, for whom he played six games.

On October 26, 2019, Kyser was drafted 10th overall by the Lakeland Magic of the NBA G League. He averaged 9.0 points, 5.8 rebounds, and 1.7 blocks in 26.2 minutes per game, over 41 games. Kyser was waived on March 10, 2020.

=== 2020-present ===
On July 31, he signed with VEF Rīga of the Latvian–Estonian Basketball League. Kyser averaged 11.8 points, 1.8 blocks (leading the Estonian-Latvian Basketball League), and 7.3 rebounds (9th in the Estonian-Latvian Basketball League) per game, with a 56.0% field goal percentage.

On July 15, 2021, he signed with Hapoel Holon of the Israeli Basketball Premier League. During the season, he averaged 1.4 blocks per game (4th in the league), while also averaging 11.0 points and 5.9 rebounds in 23.3 minutes per game with a 61.8% field goal percentage.

On July 13, 2022, he signed with Surne Bilbao Basket of the Liga ACB and the Basketball Champions League. During the season, he averaged 1.2 blocks per game (6th in the league), while also averaging 7.6 points and 3.7 rebounds in 20.0 minutes per game with a 52.0% field goal percentage.

On July 21, 2023, he signed with Samsunspor of the Turkish Basketbol Süper Ligi (BSL). During the season, he averaged 1.4 blocks per game (4th in the league), while also averaging 10.9 points and 7.0 rebounds (9th in the league) in 32.9 minutes per game with a 51.3% field goal percentage.

On February 15, 2024, he signed with Wilki Morskie Szczecin of the Polish Basketball League (PLK). During the season, he averaged 1.0 blocks per game (10th in the league), while also averaging 9.8 points and 5.8 rebounds in 21.9 minutes per game with a 59.7% field goal percentage.

On July 25, 2024, he signed with Hapoel Holon of the Israeli Basketball Premier League.

On July 14, 2025, he signed with EWE Baskets Oldenburg in the Basketball Bundesliga (BBL).

== Career statistics ==
Legend
GP	Games played	GS	Games started	MPG	Minutes per game
FG%	Field goal percentage	3P%	3-point field goal percentage	FT%	Free throw percentage
RPG	Rebounds per game	APG	Assists per game	SPG	Steals per game
BPG	Blocks per game	PPG	Points per game	**Bold**	Career high

Year	Team	GP	GS	MPG	FG%	3P%	FT%	RPG	APG	SPG	BPG	PPG
2011–12	Louisiana Tech	33	2	13.5	.463	.000	.500	2.6	.2	.4	1.8	3.7
2012–13	Louisiana Tech	34	33	19.3	.479	.000	**.623**	5.3	**.6**	**.6**	2.7	5.0
2013–14	Louisiana Tech	**36**	34	23.3	.571	.000	.500	**6.6**	.4	.5	**3.0**	7.0
2014–15	Louisiana Tech	**36**	**35**	**28.4**	**.605**	.000	.606	**6.6**	.4	**.6**	2.8	**8.6**
Career		139	104	21.3	.543	.000	.558	5.3	.4	.5	2.6	6.2
