= Lucky Jones =

American basketball player (born 1993)

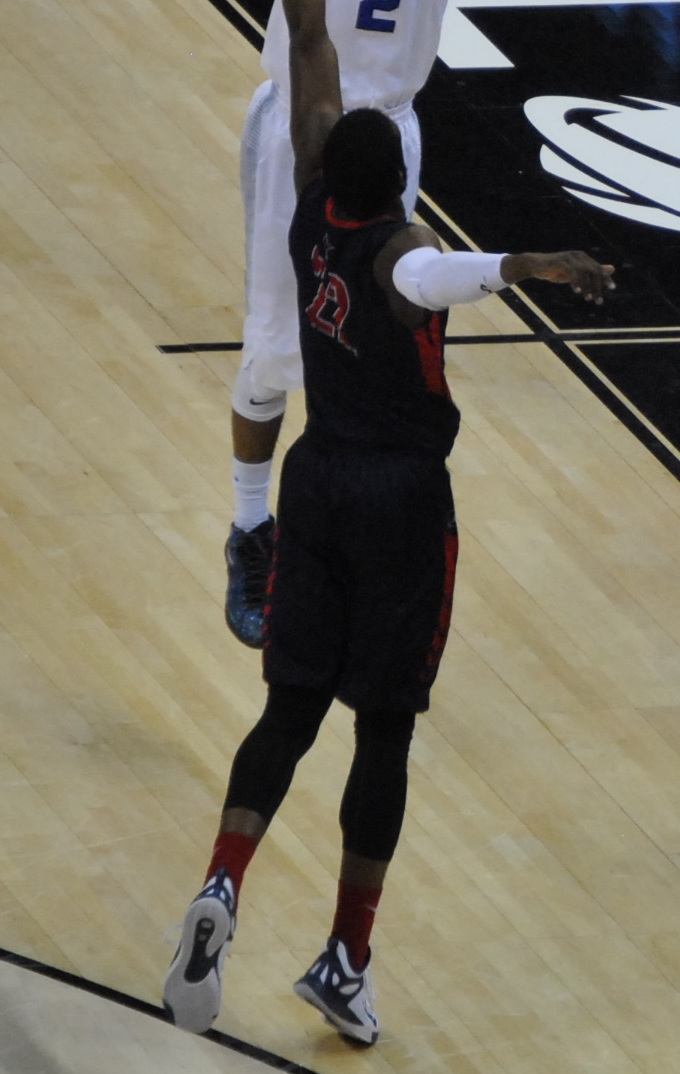

Ternopil
- Position: Small forward / shooting guard
- League: Ukrainian Basketball Superleague

Personal information
- Born: April 22, 1993 (age 33) Newark, New Jersey, U.S.
- Listed height: 6 ft 6.25 in (1.99 m)
- Listed weight: 210 lb (95 kg)

Career information
- High school: St. Anthony (Jersey City, New Jersey)
- College: Robert Morris (2011–2015)
- NBA draft: 2015: undrafted
- Playing career: 2015–present

Career history
- 2015–2016: Liège Basket
- 2016–2017: Hyères-Toulon
- 2017: Promitheas Patras
- 2017–2018: PAOK Thessaloniki
- 2018–2019: Aris Thessaloniki
- 2019–2020: Medi Bayreuth
- 2020: Ionikos Nikaias
- 2020: Kauhajoki Karhu
- 2020: Cherkaski Mavpy
- 2021: Beltway Bombers
- 2022–present: BC Ternopil

Career highlights
- Belgian League steals leader (2016); 2× Second-team All-NEC (2014, 2015); Third-team All-NEC (2013); NEC All-Rookie team (2012)

Lucious "Lucky" Jones (born April 22, 1993) is an American professional basketball player for BC Ternopil of the Ukrainian Basketball SuperLeague. He played college basketball for Robert Morris, from 2011 until 2015. Jones entered the 2015 NBA draft, but did not get selected.

== High school career ==
Jones played high school basketball at St. Anthony, in Jersey City, New Jersey, where he was part of the team that won the Non-Public B state championship in 2011.

== College career ==
Jones played college basketball at Robert Morris, from 2011 to 2015. During his senior year, he averaged 14.3 points 5.9 rebounds, and 1.4 assists per game.

== Professional career ==
Following the close of his college career, Jones failed to be drafted in the 2015 NBA draft. On July 7, 2015, Jones joined Liège Basket of the Belgian League. He went on to average 14.3 points 5.2 rebounds, and 1.5 assists per game in 31 Belgian League games.

The following season, he signed with Hyères-Toulon of the French LNB Pro A. On January 4, 2017, Jones left Hyeres-Toulon, and joined the Greek club Promitheas Patras, for the rest of the season, as he replaced Lasan Kromah on the team's squad.

On July 15, 2017, Jones joined PAOK Thessaloniki of the Greek League. He averaged 9.3 points and 5.7 rebounds per game.

On July 19, 2018, Jones joined local rivals Aris. On July 1, 2019, he parted ways with the Greek club.

In summer 2019, Jones initially signed with his third Greek team, Panionios, but on September 10, 2019, his contract was bought out by German club Medi Bayreuth, which also competes in the FIBA Europe Cup.

On January 14, 2020, he signed with Ionikos Nikaias of the Greek Basket League. In 2020, he signed with Cherkaski Mavpy of the USL, where in four games Jones averaged 16.8 points, 4.5 rebounds, 1.5 assists and 1.3 steals per game. He parted ways with the team on November 4.

On January 12, 2022, Jones signed with BC Ternopil.
