= Dimitrios Verginis =

Greek basketball player

Dimitris Verginis Δημήτρης Βεργίνης
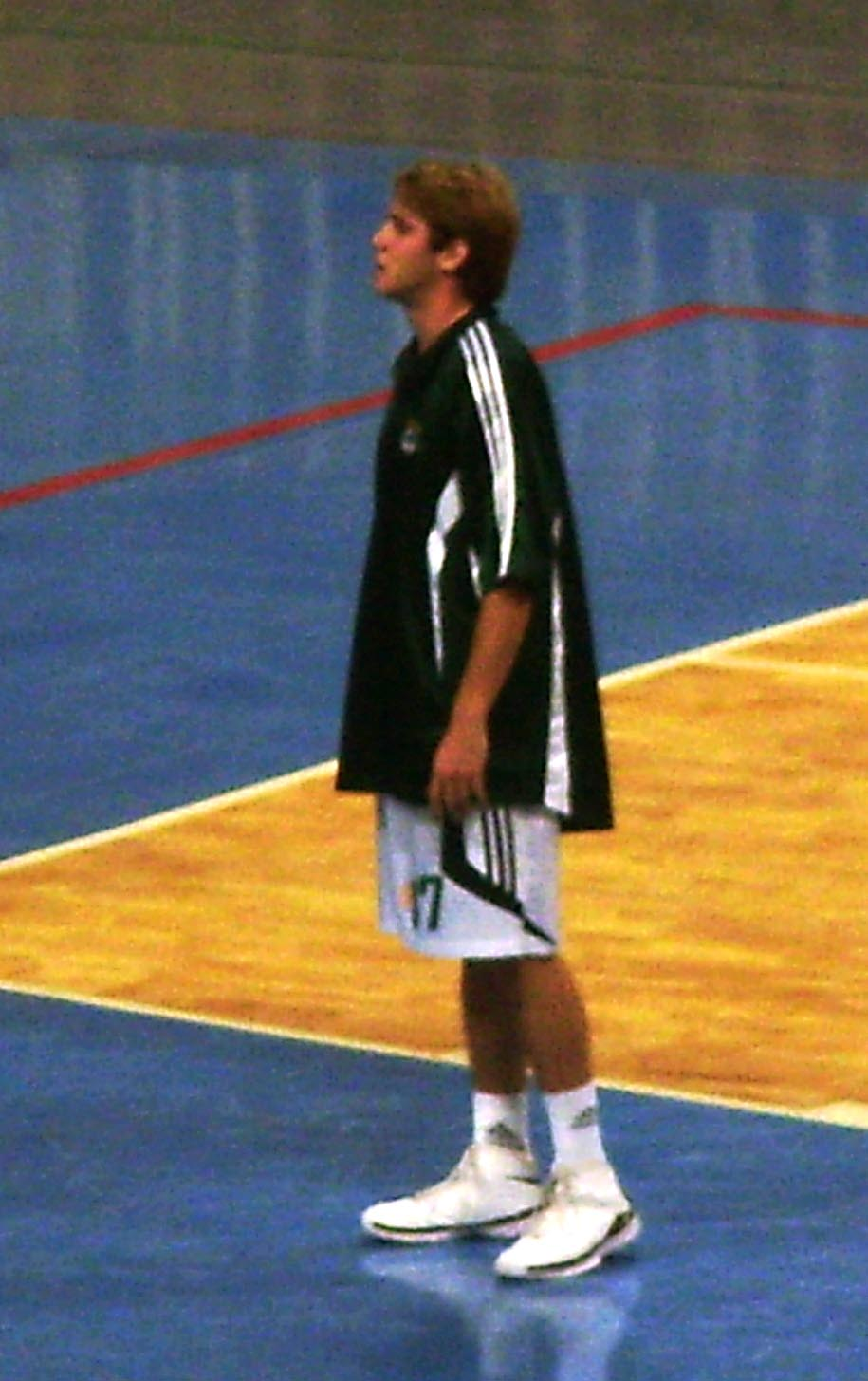
- Verginis with Panathinaikos in 2008

Personal information
- Born: May 15, 1987 (age 39) Thessaloniki, Greece
- Listed height: 6 ft 3 in (1.91 m)
- Listed weight: 205 lb (93 kg)

Career information
- Playing career: 2005–present
- Position: Point guard / shooting guard

Career history
- 2005–2008: PAOK
- 2008–2010: Panathinaikos
- 2010–2013: Aris Thessaloniki
- 2013–2014: Lukoil Academic
- 2014–2015: Panionios
- 2015–2017: Apollon Patras
- 2017–2018: Lavrio
- 2018–2019: Aris Thessaloniki
- 2019–2020: Panionios
- 2020–2021: Iraklis Thessaloniki
- 2021–2022: ASK Karditsas
- 2022–2024: Panionios

Career highlights
- EuroLeague champion (2009); FIBA EuroChallenge All-Star (2008); 2× Greek League champion (2009, 2010); Greek Cup winner (2009); Greek 2nd Division champion (2022)

Dimitrios Verginis (alternate spelling: Dimitris) (Greek: Δημήτρης Βεργίνης; born May 15, 1987) is a Greek professional basketball player. He is 1.91 m (6 ft 3 in) tall. He can play both the point guard and shooting guard positions.

== Professional career ==
Born in Thessaloniki, Greece, Verginis started his career playing with the Asteria Panoramatos junior teams in Greece, and he played with the senior team of Anatolia in the 2004–05 season. He debuted in both the Greek League and the FIBA EuroChallenge in the 2005–06 season with PAOK. In the 2006–07 season, he played in the European-wide 2nd-tier level league, the EuroCup, for the first time.

He was selected to the FIBA EuroChallenge's All-Star Game in the 2007–08 season. Verginis was the youngest player to ever be named the team captain in the history of PAOK, when he took over that role from Kostas Vasileiadis. In 2008, he left PAOK, and joined the Greek club Panathinaikos.

Verginis stayed with Panathinaikos for 2 years. In 2010, he signed with Aris, where he played until June 2012. He then signed with the Spanish League club Bilbao Basket, in June 2012, and stayed with them through the preseason.

He then returned to Aris for the 2012–13 regular season. He then moved to the Bulgarian League club Lukoil Academic for the 2013–14 season. He joined Panionios for the 2014–15 season. He then moved to Apollon Patras. He joined Lavrio for the 2017–18 season. On June 28, 2018, Verginis officially returned to Aris for a second stint. He joined the Greek club Panionios, in 2019.

On July 22, 2020, Verginis signed a two-year contract with Iraklis Thessaloniki. He averaged 5.0 points, 1.2 rebounds, and 1.1 assists per game. On October 1, 2021, Verginis signed with ASK Karditsas of the Greek A2 Basket League.

== National team career ==
Verginis was a member of the Greek junior national teams. He played with Greece's junior national teams at the following tournaments: the 2003 FIBA Europe Under-16 Championship, the 2004 FIBA Europe Under-18 Championship, the 2005 FIBA Europe Under-18 Championship, the 2006 FIBA Europe Under-20 Championship, and the 2007 FIBA Europe Under-20 Championship.

== Career statistics ==
Legend
GP	Games played	GS	Games started	MPG	Minutes per game
FG%	Field-goal percentage	3P%	3-point field-goal percentage	FT%	Free-throw percentage
RPG	Rebounds per game	APG	Assists per game	SPG	Steals per game
BPG	Blocks per game	PPG	Points per game	PIR	Performance index rating
**Bold**	Career high

=== EuroLeague ===
Year	Team	GP	GS	MPG	FG%	3P%	FT%	RPG	APG	SPG	BPG	PPG	PIR
2009–10	Panathinaikos	2	0	4.5	.500	.500	—	.5	—	—	—	1.5	1.0
Career		2	0	4.5	.500	.500	—	.5	—	—	—	1.5	1.0

== Awards and accomplishments ==
- FIBA EuroChallenge All-Star Game: (2008)
- Greek Cup Winner: (2009)
- 2× Greek League Champion: (2009, 2010)
- EuroLeague Champion: (2009)
- Triple Crown Winner: (2009)
