= Diamantis Slaftsakis =

Greek basketball player (born 1994)

Diamantis Slaftsakis Διαμαντής Σλαφτσάκης
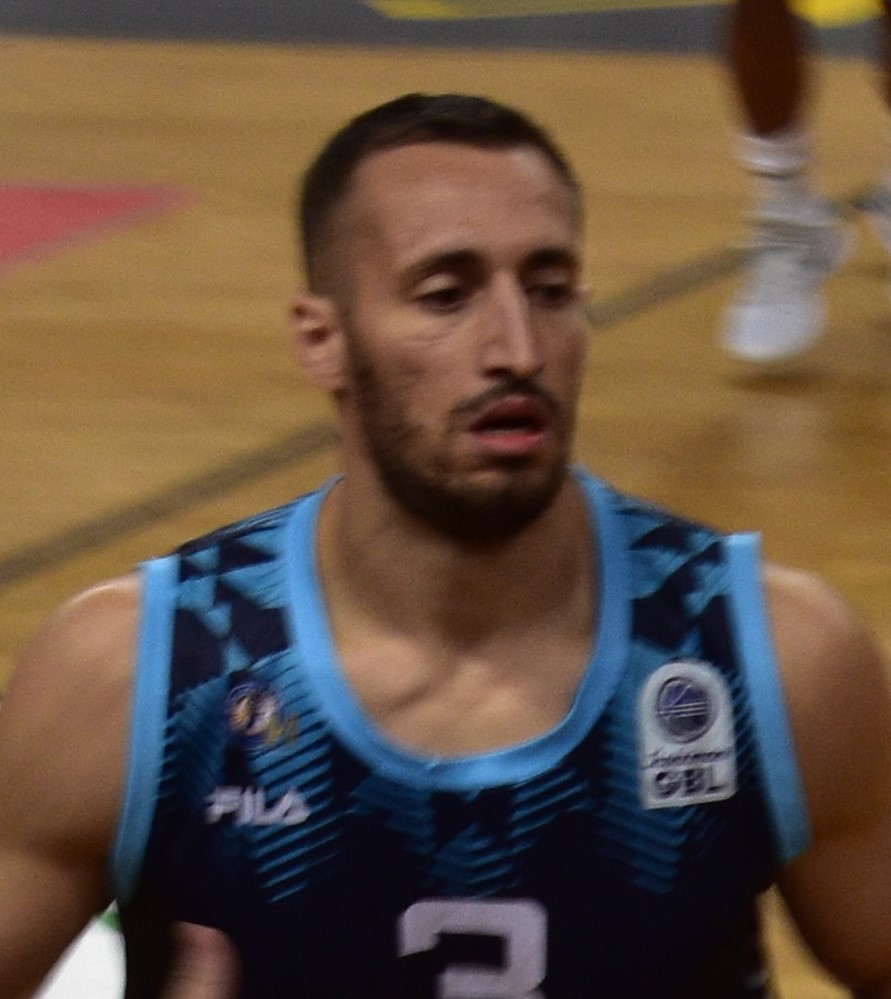
- Slaftsakis with Kolossos Rodou

No. 13 – Iraklis Thessaloniki
- Position: Power forward
- League: Greek Basketball League; FIBA Europe Cup

Personal information
- Born: 27 July 1994 (age 32) Panorama, Thessaloniki, Greece
- Listed height: 6 ft 7 in (2.01 m)
- Listed weight: 195 lb (88 kg)

Career information
- Playing career: 2012–present

Career history
- 2012–2015: KAOD
- 2015–2016: Koroivos Amaliadas
- 2016–2017: Apollon Patras
- 2017–2018: Trikala
- 2018–2021: Aris Thessaloniki
- 2021–2022: Kolossos Rodou
- 2022–2023: PAOK Thessaloniki
- 2023–2024: Aris Thessaloniki
- 2024–2025: Kolossos Rodou
- 2025–2026: PAOK Thessaloniki
- 2026–Present: Iraklis Thessaloniki

Diamantis Slaftsakis (Greek: Διαμαντής Σλαφτσάκης; born July 27, 1994) is a Greek professional basketball player for Iraklis Thessaloniki of the Greek Basketball League (GBL) and the FIBA Europe Cup. He is 2.02 m (6 ft 7 1/2 in) tall. He plays at the power forward position.

== Youth career ==
Slaftsakis played youth basketball with Halkidona and Mantoulidis, before he started his pro career.

== Professional career ==
Slaftsakis began his professional career with the Greek League club KAOD, during the 2012–13 season. He left KAOD, when the club was relegated down from the first-tier Greek Basket League, due to financial problems, in 2015. He then joined Koroivos Amaliadas.

On July 21, 2016, Slaftsakis signed with Apollon Patras. He then joined Trikala Aries, where he became the team's captain.

On July 29, 2018, he joined Aris of the Greek Basket League, where he spent three consecutive seasons.

On July 5, 2021, Slaftsakis signed with Kolossos Rodou. In 25 games, he averaged 3.1 points and 2 rebounds in 11 minutes per contest.

On August 10, 2022, Slaftsakis moved back to Thessaloniki for PAOK. In 28 league games, he averaged 2.3 points and 1.4 rebounds in 8 minutes per contest.

On July 13, 2023, Slaftsakis returned to Aris after two seasons.

On July 21, 2024, Slaftsakis re-joined Kolossos Rodou of the Greek Basket League.

On July 12, 2025, Slaftsakis returned to PAOK for a second stint.

On 3 July 2026, Slaftsakis signed with Iraklis.

== Greek national team ==
Slaftsakis was a member of the junior national teams of Greece. He played at the 2010 FIBA Europe Under-16 Championship, the 2012 FIBA Europe Under-18 Championship, the 2013 FIBA Europe Under-20 Championship, and the 2014 FIBA Europe Under-20 Championship with the junior national teams of Greece.
