= Ramon Harris =

American basketball player (born 1988)

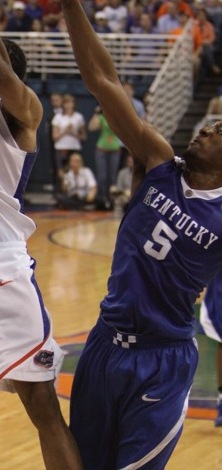

Personal information
- Born: May 26, 1988 (age 38) Anchorage, Alaska, U.S.
- Listed height: 6 ft 7 in (2.01 m)
- Listed weight: 220 lb (100 kg)

Career information
- High school: West Anchorage (Anchorage, Alaska)
- College: Kentucky (2006–2010)
- NBA draft: 2010: undrafted
- Playing career: 2010–2020
- Position: Small forward / power forward
- Number: 22

Career history
- 2010-2011: Trotamundos de Carabobo
- 2011: Ningxia Hanas
- 2011–2012: Fort Wayne Mad Ants
- 2012–2013: BG Göttingen
- 2013–2015: Fort Wayne Mad Ants
- 2015: Rayos de Hermosillo
- 2015–2016: Fort Wayne Mad Ants
- 2016: Iowa Energy
- 2016–2017: Grand Rapids Drive
- 2017–2018: Kolossos Rodou
- 2018–2019: Aris Thessaloniki
- 2019–2020: Rethymno Cretan Kings

Career highlights
- NBA D-League champion (2014)

Ramon Harris (born May 26, 1988) is an American former professional basketball player. Standing at 2.01 metres (6 feet 7 inches), he plays at the small forward position. After four years at Kentucky Harris entered the 2010 NBA draft but was not selected in the draft's two rounds.

== High school career ==
Harris played high school basketball at West Anchorage High School in Anchorage, Alaska.

== College career ==
Harris played four years with Kentucky Wildcats from 2006 to 2010, mostly coming off the bench.

== Professional career ==
After going undrafted in the 2010 NBA draft, Harris began his pro career with the NBA Development League's Rio Grande Valley Vipers. After the pre-season, he was not signed, however. On February 8, 2011, he signed a deal with Trotamundos in Venezuela's top-level LPB league. He then joined Ningxia Hanas until the end of the season. On his debut, in a 106–95 win over Hangzhou, Harris started and played 33 minutes, scoring 16 points. He also pulled down 7 rebounds and picked up 3 steals.

On December 6, 2011, Harris was reacquired by the Fort Wayne Mad Ants in the NBA Development League where he stayed for one season before joining BG Göttingen. The next three seasons, he returned to the NBA Development League playing again with Fort Wayne Mad Ants, having also a small spell at Mexico, where he played with Rayos de Hermosillo.

On 2016, Harris moved to Iowa Energy. His really good performances caused the interest of the Memphis Grizzlies, but he never joined the team. The next season, he played again in the NBA Development League this time for Grand Rapids Drive.

On August 15, 2017, he joined Kolossos Rodou of the Greek Basket League. He joined Rethymno Cretan Kings in 2019. Harris averaged 5.1 points, 5.1 rebounds and 1.5 assists per game in 2019–20.
