= Zamal Nixon =

American basketball player

Free agent
- Position: Point guard

Personal information
- Born: January 7, 1989 (age 37) Brooklyn, New York, U.S.
- Listed height: 6 ft 1 in (1.85 m)
- Listed weight: 170 lb (77 kg)

Career information
- High school: Boys & Girls (Brooklyn, New York)
- College: Houston (2007–2011)
- NBA draft: 2011: undrafted
- Playing career: 2011–present

Career history
- 2011–2012: Hertener Loewen
- 2012–2013: Nürnberger
- 2013–2014: WBC Raiffeisen Wels
- 2014–2015: Phoenix Hagen
- 2015–2016: Lavrio
- 2016: Limoges CSP
- 2016–2019: Lavrio
- 2019–2020: MLP Academics Heidelberg
- 2020: Riesen Ludwigsburg
- 2020: Promitheas Patras

Career highlights
- C-USA All-Defensive Team (2011)

Zamal Nixon (born January 7, 1989) is an American professional basketball player who last played for Science City Jena of the German ProA. After a successful four years at the University of Houston, Nixon entered the 2011 NBA draft but was not selected in the draft's two rounds.

== High school career ==
Nixon played high school basketball at Boys & Girls High School, in Brooklyn, New York.

== College career ==
Nixon played college basketball for the Houston Cougars from 2007 to 2011. During his senior year, Nixon went on to average 10.3 points, 4.7 assists and 2.6 rebounds per game.

== Professional career ==
After going undrafted in the 2011 NBA draft, Nixon joined Hertener Loewen. The following year, he joined Nürnberg. For the 2013–14 season, he signed for WBC Raiffeisen Wels.

On August 15, 2014, Nixon signed with Phoenix Hagen after a successful tryout.

On August 31, 2015, Nixon signed with Greek club Lavrio. He went on to average 9.6 points, 2.1 rebounds, 3.5 assists and 1.5 steals in 21 games for Lavrio.

On June 26, 2016, he signed with Limoges CSP. On December 28, 2016, he left Limoges and returned to Lavrio for the rest of the season. On July 3, 2017, he re-signed with Lavrio for one more season.

In 2020, Nixon played seven games for Riesen Ludwigsburg, averaging 4.6 points, 1.6 rebounds and 1.9 assists per game. On September 21, 2020, Nixon signed with Promitheas Patras of the Greek Basket League. After two games, he signed with Science City Jena of the German ProA on October 12.

== The Basketball Tournament (TBT) ==
In the summer of 2017, Nixon, for the second year, competed in The Basketball Tournament on ESPN for Team Fancy. In three games, he averaged 10.0 points, 2.7 rebounds and 2.7 assists to help lead his team to the Super 16 Round where they lost 65-61 to Boeheim's Army; a team composed of Syracuse University basketball alum. Nixon also competed in TBT in 2015 for the Sean Bell All-Star's. In four games that summer, he averaged 13.5 points, 2.8 rebounds and 2.3 assists per game.
