= Stratos Voulgaropoulos =

Greek basketball player

No. 32 – Doxa Lefkadas
- Position: Center
- League: Greek A2 Basket League

Personal information
- Born: October 31, 2000 (age 26) Thessaloniki, Greece
- Listed height: 7 ft 2 in (2.18 m)
- Listed weight: 225 lb (102 kg)

Career information
- Playing career: 2019–present

Career history
- 2019–2020: Aris Thessaloniki
- 2020–2023: Lavrio
- 2022–2023: → Iraklis Thessaloniki
- 2023–present: Doxa Lefkadas

Efstratios "Stratos" Voulgaropoulos (Greek: Ευστράτιος "Στράτος" Βουλγαρόπουλος; born October 31, 2000) is a Greek professional basketball player for Doxa Lefkadas of the Greek A2 Basket League. He is 2.18 m (7 ft 2 in) tall, and he plays at the center position.

== Professional career ==
=== Aris Thessaloniki ===
Voulgaropoulos joined the youth teams of the Greek club KAOD, in 2014. He signed with the youth teams of the Greek club Aris, in 2016. In the 2018–19 season, he played in Greece's top-tier Greek Basket League, for the first time, with the senior men's team of Aris, in a game against Panathinaikos.

=== Lavrio ===
In the summer of 2020, Voulgaropoulos moved south for Lavrio, where he miraculously reached the Greek Basket League finals in 2021. In 18 games, he averaged 1.9 points, 1.3 rebounds and 0.3 blocks in 6 minutes per contest. In 18 league games during the 2021-2022 campaign, Voulgaropoulos posted an identical stat line of 1.9 points, 1.3 rebounds and 0.3 blocks in 6 minutes per contest. In 3 games with Lavrio during the 2022-2023 campaign, he averaged a slightly improved 2 points and 2.3 rebounds in 6 minutes per contest.

==== Loan to Iraklis Thessaloniki ====
On November 7, 2022, Voulgaropoulos returned to Thessaloniki for Iraklis via a two-way contract loan deal. With Iraklis, he averaged 3.8 points, 3.8 rebounds and 1 block per contest.

=== Doxa Lefkadas ===
On July 13, 2023, Voulgaropoulos was signed by Doxa Lefkadas.

== National team career ==
Voulgaropoulos has been a member of the junior national teams of Greece. With Greece's junior national teams, he played at the 2018 FIBA Under-18 European Championship, and at the 2019 FIBA Under-19 World Cup.
