= Gary McGhee =

American basketball player (born 1988)

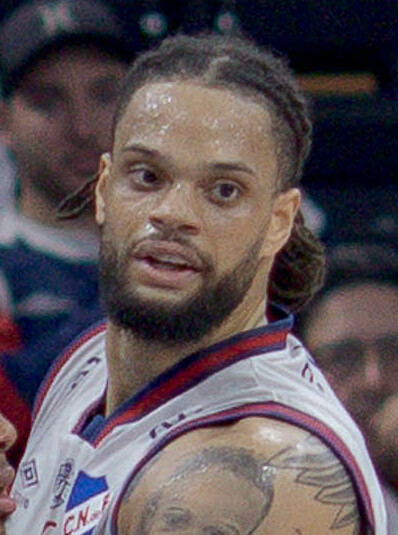

Minnesota Timberwolves
- Title: Player development associate
- League: NBA

Personal information
- Born: October 28, 1988 (age 38) Anderson, Indiana, U.S.
- Listed height: 6 ft 11 in (2.11 m)
- Listed weight: 250 lb (113 kg)

Career information
- High school: Highland (Anderson, Indiana)
- College: Pittsburgh (2007–2011)
- NBA draft: 2011: undrafted
- Playing career: 2011–2024
- Position: Center
- Number: 52

Career history

Playing
- 2011–2012: Bandırma Kırmızı
- 2012–2013: Bayreuth
- 2013: Gravelines
- 2013–2014: Riesen Ludwigsburg
- 2014: Oradea
- 2014: Prishtina
- 2014–2015: Breogán
- 2015–2016: Kolossos Rodou
- 2016–2017: Tigers Tübingen
- 2017–2018: Kymis
- 2018–2019: Aris
- 2019–2020: Benfica
- 2020–2021: Básquet Coruña
- 2021: Abejas de León
- 2021–2022: Regatas Corrientes
- 2022–2023: Nacional
- 2023: Regatas Corrientes
- 2024: Apaches de Mexicali
- 2024: Guaiqueríes de Margarita

Coaching
- 2026–present: Minnesota Timberwolves

Career highlights
- Reese’s College All-Star Game co-MVP (2011); Greek Basket League rebounding leader (2017–18); Liga Nacional de Básquet rebounding leader (2021–22)

Gary McGhee (born October 28, 1988) is an American former professional basketball player who currently serves as a player development associate for the Minnesota Timberwolves of the National Basketball Association (NBA). He was a member of Pittsburgh Panthers men's basketball team. In 2009–10, McGhee was selected to the CBE Classic All-Tournament Team, led the Panthers in field goal percentage at 62.3%, and at the end of the season was named the team's Defensive Player of the Year.

== College career ==
=== 2007–08 ===
In his freshman year, McGhee appeared in 21 games, played 103 minutes, and scored 31 points (1.5 ppg) with 30 rebounds (1.4 rpg) for Pitt Panther team that won the 2008 Big East men's basketball tournament. He saw action in four minutes with one offensive rebound in his career debut against North Carolina A&T, on November 10. As the season progressed, he continued to contribute, at the end of the year he earned team co-Most Improved Player Award at the team banquet.

=== 2008–09 ===
As a sophomore, McGhee played in 31 of 36 games with one start, against Belmont. He finished season with 38 points, 48 rebounds and eight blocked shots in 207 minutes of action for the Pitt team that earned a number one seed in the 2009 NCAA basketball tournament and advanced to the Elite Eight.

=== 2009–10 ===
McGhee's junior year saw huge increases in production. In 24.2 minutes per game (34 games) McGhee averaged 6.9 ppg and 6.8 rpg. He was one of four players to start all 34 games, and led the team in FG%, at 62.3%. That year's Pitt team finished the season ranked and earned a three seed in the 2010 NCAA Tournament.

=== 2010–11 ===
Lauded as one of the Big East's best defenders, he started all 34 games at the center. Scored 10 points and grabbed 18 rebounds in the NABC College All-Star Game in Houston. Earned rebounding award at team banquet for a Pitt team that won the Big East regular season championship and earned a number one seed in the 2011 NCAA Tournament. McGhee averaged 9.0 rebounds per game in Pitt's two NCAA Tournament games. Pulled down career-highs of 15 rebounds and 12 defensive rebounds at DePaul, 1/22. Grabbed a game-high 13 rebounds and set a career-high 11 defensive rebounds vs. Syracuse, 1/17. Tied a career-high with 13 points and 10 rebounds vs. Seton Hall, 1/15. Tallied a career-high 13 points, all coming in the second half, and grabbed nine rebounds at Providence, 1/4. Posted a double-double with career-highs of 12 points and 13 rebounds, and a career-high seven blocks against Duquesne, 12/1. The seven blocks tied a program record. In the 2011 Big East men's basketball tournament quarterfinal against UConn, with seconds left in the game, Kemba Walker sent McGhee to the floor with a double stepback, and hit a game winning shot which motivated UConn to the final.

== Professional career ==
After two seasons playing in Europe, McGhee joined the Golden State Warriors for the 2013 NBA Summer League. In December 2013, he signed with MHP Riesen Ludwigsburg.

On July 30, 2014, McGhee signed with Romanian team CSM Oradea.

On November 20, 2014, McGhee signed with Sigal Prishtina from Kosovo. On December 18, 2014, he signed with CB Breogán.

On July 29, 2016, McGhee signed with German club Tigers Tübingen.

On October 23, 2017, McGhee signed with Greek club Kymis.

On July 27, 2018, McGhee signed with Greek club Aris.

On August 10, 2019, McGhee signed with Mamak Belediye Yeni Mamak Spor of the Turkish Basketball First League.

On September 3, 2019, McGhee signed with Benfica of the Portuguese Basketball League. He averaged 7.5 points and 5.3 rebounds per game.

On November 5, 2020, McGhee signed with Básquet Coruña of the LEB Oro.

On July 15, 2021, McGhee signed with Abejas de León of the LNBP. He averaged 11.5 points and 8.5 rebounds per game. On November 17, 2021, McGhee signed with Regatas Corrientes of the Liga Nacional de Básquet. After the 2021–22 season with Regatas Corrientes in Argentina, McGhee signed with Club Nacional de Football of the Uruguayan Basketball League for the 2022–23 campaign.

On July 11, 2023, McGhee signed a contract to return to Regatas Corrientes for another season in Argentina's Liga Nacional.

In March 2024, McGhee joined Apaches de Mexicali in Mexico's Liga Nacional de Baloncesto Profesional. Later in April 2024, McGhee signed with Guaiqueríes de Margarita of Venezuela's Superliga Profesional de Baloncesto.

== Coaching career ==
In September 2024, McGhee transitioned into coaching, joining the Indiana Pacers as a team assistant.

On September 25, 2026, the Minnesota Timberwolves hired McGhee to serve as a player development associate under head coach Chris Finch.
