= Vassilis Toliopoulos =

Greek basketball player (born 1996)

Vassilis Toliopoulos Βασίλης Τολιόπουλος
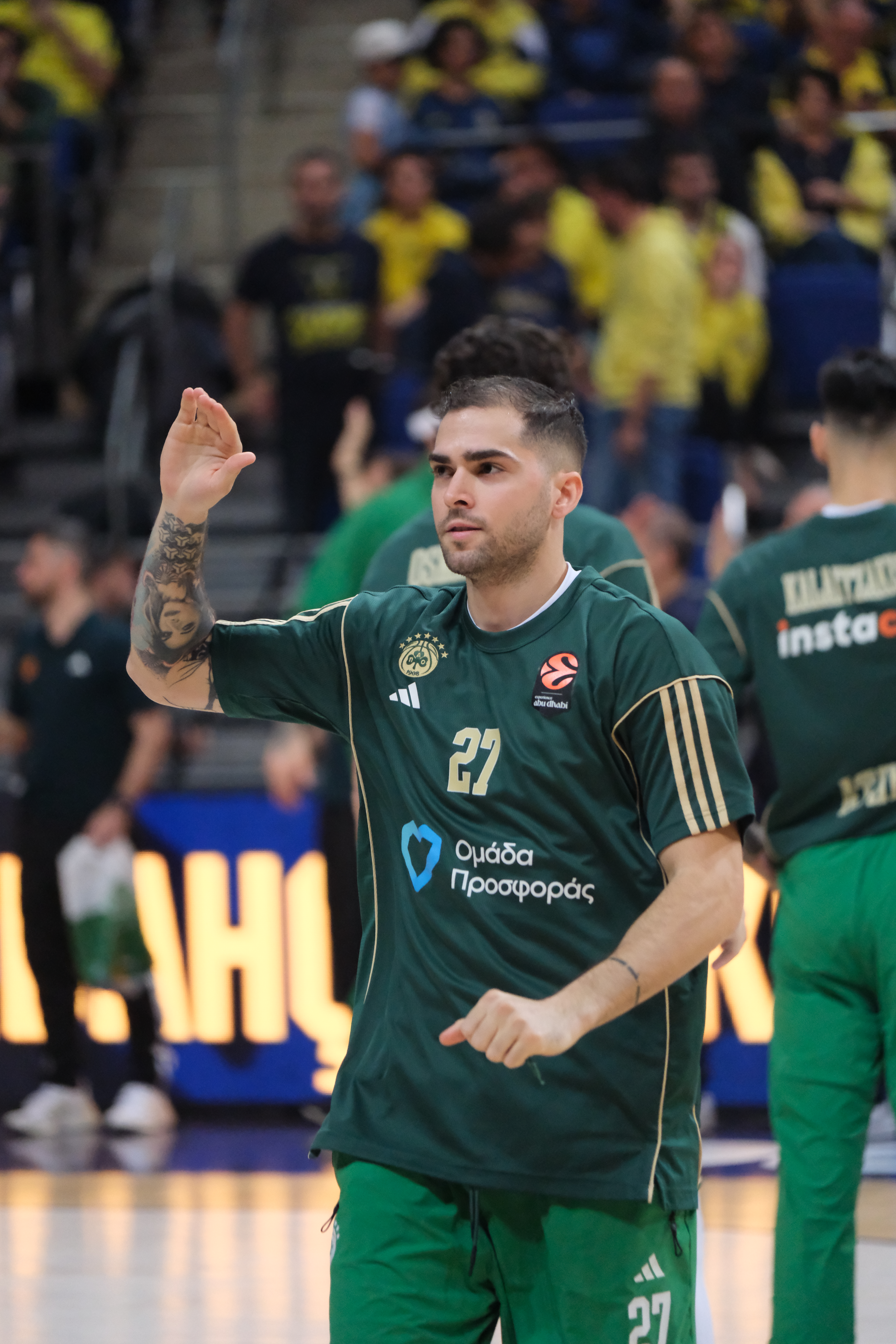
- Toliopoulos with Panathinaikos in 2025

No. 4 – Aris Thessaloniki
- Position: Point guard / shooting guard
- League: GBL; EuroCup

Personal information
- Born: 15 June 1996 (age 30) Athens, Greece
- Listed height: 6 ft 2 in (1.88 m)
- Listed weight: 174 lb (79 kg)

Career information
- Playing career: 2013–present

Career history
- 2013–2014: Ikaros Kallitheas
- 2014–2015: Kolossos Rodou
- 2015–2019: Olympiacos
- 2019: Aris Thessaloniki
- 2019–2021: AEK Athens
- 2020–2021: →Ionikos Nikaias
- 2021–2022: PAOK Thessaloniki
- 2022–2025: Aris Thessaloniki
- 2023: →Boulazac
- 2025–2026: Panathinaikos
- 2026–present: Aris Thessaloniki

Career highlights
- Greek League champion (2016); Greek League Most Improved Player (2024); 2× Greek Cup winner (2020, 2026); 2× Greek League All-Star (2022, 2023)
Medals
Men's Basketball
Representing Greece
EuroBasket
Bronze medal – third place	2025 Cyprus–Finland–Poland–Latvia
FIBA Europe Under-20 Championship B
Bronze medal – third place	2016 Greece	Under-20

Vassilis Toliopoulos (alternative spellings: Vasilis, Vasileios) (Greek: Βασίλης Τολιόπουλος; born 15 June 1996) is a Greek professional basketball player for Aris Thessaloniki of the Greek Basketball League (GBL) and the EuroCup. He is a 1.88 m (6 ft 2 in) tall combo guard.

== Youth career ==
Toliopoulos played from a young age with the youth teams of the Greek club Panionios Athens, before he started his pro career with Ikaros Chalkidas.

== Professional career ==
Toliopoulos began his professional career with the Greek League club Ikaros Chalkidas, during the 2013–14 season. In 2014, he moved to the Greek club Kolossos Rodou. In the summer of 2015, he joined the Greek EuroLeague club Olympiacos Piraeus, when he signed a 4-year contract with the club.

Toliopoulos moved to the Greek club Aris Thessaloniki, in early 2019. On 4 July 2019, he signed a four-year contract with the Greek club AEK Athens. On 31 August 2020, Toliopoulos was loaned by AEK to the Greek club Ionikos Nikaias, for the 2020–21 season. He averaged 11.6 points and 3.5 assists per game in the Greek Basket League with Ionikos, during the 2020–21 season.

On 29 June 2021, Toliopoulos signed a two-year (1+1) contract with the Greek club PAOK Thessaloniki. In 23 Greek Basket League games played during the 2021–22 season, he averaged 6.3 points, 1.8 rebounds and 2 assists, while playing in around 15 minutes per contest. Additionally, in 8 FIBA BCL games played, he averaged 8.3 points and 3.3 assists per game. On July 1, 2022, the club opted out of their mutual contract, and Toliopoulos became a free agent.

On 6 July 2022, Toliopoulos returned to Aris Thessaloniki. In 22 domestic Greek Basket League games played in the 2022–2023 season, he averaged 12.8 points, 2.3 rebounds, 4 assists, and 1.5 steals per game, while playing around 29 minutes per contest. Toliopoulos also achieved a career-high of 37 points in a game against Peristeri Athens. On 22 April 2023, Toliopoulos moved to French 2nd Division club Boulazac Dordogne, for the remainder of the 2022–23 season. On 23 June 2023, he returned to Aris, after he renewed his contract with the club for another season.

During the 2023–24 season, Toliopoulos averaged 13.2 points per contest, in 32 national domestic league matches, as well as 14.4 points, 2.4 rebounds and 3.6 assists per game, in 17 EuroCup games played. On 14 June 2024, despite interest from many foreign clubs, Toliopoulos signed a new contract extension with Aris.

On 23 June 2025, Toliopoulos signed a contract with EuroLeague powerhouse Panathinaikos.

On July 24, 2026, Toliopoulos signed a four–year contract with Aris Thessaloniki of the Greek Basketball League (GBL) and the EuroCup.

== National team career ==
=== Greek junior national team ===
Toliopoulos played at the 2012 FIBA Europe Under-16 Championship, the 2013 FIBA Europe Under-18 Championship, and the 2014 FIBA Europe Under-18 Championship with the junior national teams of Greece. He also played at the 2015 FIBA Under-19 World Cup, and the 2nd division 2016 FIBA Europe Under-20 Championship Division B, where he won a bronze medal.

=== Greek senior national team ===
Toliopoulos has been a member of the senior men's Greek national team. He played with Greece at the 2022 FIBA EuroBasket qualifiers, the 2023 FIBA World Cup qualifiers, the 2025 FIBA EuroBasket qualifiers, and the 2024 Piraeus FIBA Men's Olympic Qualifying Tournament, where he helped Greece qualify for the 2024 Summer Olympics, for the first time since 2008. During the tournament, he was mostly a replacement, but due to his status as a lethal shooter, he quickly became a fan favorite, ending the tournament with a 8.3 point average. During the preliminary stage of the actual tournament, he became a game changer for the national team, because despite the losses in the first two games against Canada and Spain, Toliopoulos helped Greece's hopes for a comeback by making several three pointers in each game. In the final group stage game against Australia, where the national team won and qualified for the knockout stage of the tournament, he was less prolific from the three point line, but still proved to be extremely helpful for the national team, by scoring 14 points, all in crucial moments.

== Style of play ==
Toliopoulos' childhood idol was the former Greek basketball player Vassilis Spanoulis and his style of play captures that.

== Career statistics ==
Legend
GP	Games played	GS	Games started	MPG	Minutes per game
FG%	Field-goal percentage	3P%	3-point field-goal percentage	FT%	Free-throw percentage
RPG	Rebounds per game	APG	Assists per game	SPG	Steals per game
BPG	Blocks per game	PPG	Points per game	PIR	Performance index rating
**Bold**	Career high

=== EuroLeague ===
Year	Team	GP	GS	MPG	FG%	3P%	FT%	RPG	APG	SPG	BPG	PPG	PIR
2015–16	Olympiacos	1	0	1.0	-	-	**1.000**	.0	.0	.0	.0	**2.0**	**3.0**
2016–17	Olympiacos	4	0	1.0	.250	**.333**	.000	.0	.0	.0	.0	.8	-0.5
2017–18	Olympiacos	**10**	0	**5.2**	**.294**	.307	.500	**.3**	**.2**	.0	**.1**	.9	1.2
2025–26	Panathinaikos	12	0	8.5	.355	.310	.800	.5	1.1	.3	.0	4.2	3.1
**Career**		27	0	5.7	.310	.311	.778	.3	.8	.2	.1	2.6	1.9

=== EuroCup ===
Year	Team	GP	GS	MPG	FG%	3P%	FT%	RPG	APG	SPG	BPG	PPG	PIR
2023–24	Aris	17	12	24.1	.433	.364	.919	2.4	3.6	.8	.1	14.4	12.6

=== Domestic Leagues ===
==== Regular season inc. Playoffs ====
Note: Only games in the primary domestic competitions are included. Therefore, games in cup or European competitions are left out.

Year	Team	League	GP	MPG	FG%	3P%	FT%	RPG	APG	SPG	BPG	PPG
2013–14	Ikaros Kallitheas B.C.	GBL	12	4.2	.222	.000	.428	.4	.2	.3	.0	1.7
2014–15	Kolossos Rodou B.C.	GBL	22	8.4	.363	.318	.857	.7	.6	.2	.0	2.4
2015–16	Olympiacos	GBL	6	5.0	.222	.250	1.000	.3	.2	.0	.0	1.2
2016–17	Olympiacos	GBL	12	7.1	.346	.333	.750	.9	.9	.2	.0	2.4
2017–18	Olympiacos	GBL	23	10.0	.428	.402	.642	1.0	1.4	.3	.0	3.9
2018–19	Olympiacos	GBL	5	4.0	.500	.167	-	.2	.6	.0	.0	1.4
2018–19	Aris	GBL	15	19.0	.358	**.342**	.722	1.5	1.5	.5	.0	7.7
2019–20	AEK B.C.	GBL	17	12.4	.393	.295	**1.00**	1.2	1.2	.4	.0	5.0
2020–21	Ionikos Nikaias B.C.	GBL	18	26.1	.351	.288	.856	1.8	3.5	1.2	.0	11.6
2021–22	PAOK BC	GBL	23	15.2	.362	.275	.851	1.8	2.0	.3	.0	6.3
2022–23	Aris	GBL	22	12.8	**.478**	.316	.835	2.3	4.0	**1.5**	.0	12.8
2023–24	Aris	GBL	22	26.1	.388	.323	.829	**2.4**	**4.6**	.9	.0	13.9
2024–25	Aris	GBL	**24**	**27.2**	.392	.324	.733	2.2	3.6	.8	.0	**15.3**

== Awards and accomplishments ==
=== Pro career ===
- Greek League Champion: (2016)
- Greek Cup Winner: (2020, 2026)
- 2× Greek League All-Star: (2022, 2023)

=== Greek junior national team ===
- 2016 FIBA U20 European Championship Division B: Bronze
