= Gary Bell Jr. =

American basketball player (born 1992)

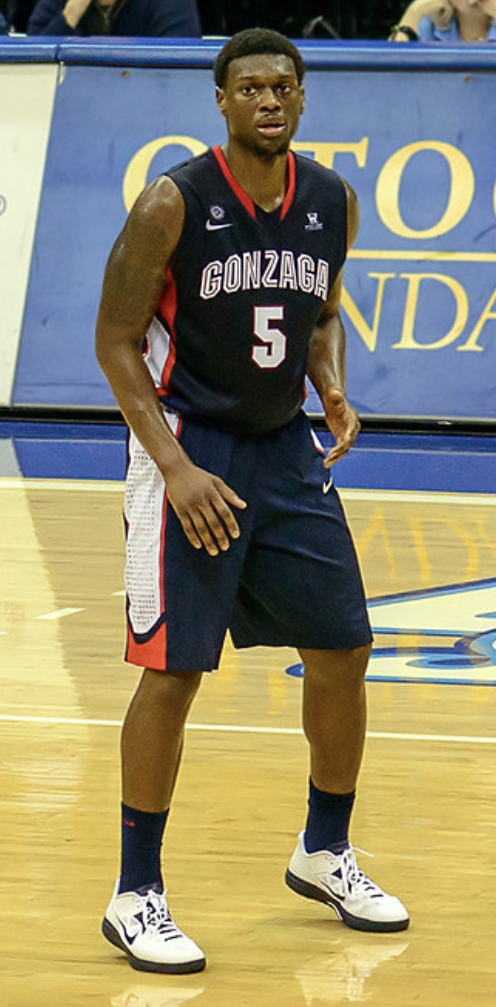
- Bell playing for Gonzaga in 2013

Northern Arizona Lumberjacks
- Position: Associate head coach
- League: Big Sky Conference

Personal information
- Born: October 12, 1992 (age 34) Kent, Washington, U.S.
- Listed height: 6 ft 2.75 in (1.90 m)
- Listed weight: 220 lb (100 kg)

Career information
- High school: Kentridge (Kent, Washington)
- College: Gonzaga (2011–2015)
- NBA draft: 2015: undrafted
- Playing career: 2015–2019
- Coaching career: 2019–present

Career history

Playing
- 2015–2016: Siarka Tarnobrzeg
- 2016–2017: Rosa Radom
- 2017: Cholet Basket
- 2017–2019: Aris Thessaloniki

Coaching
- 2019-2021: Gonzaga (GA)
- 2021-2022: Gonzaga (CBA)
- 2022-2024: Northern Arizona (asst.)
- 2024-present: Northern Arizona (assoc. head coach)

Career highlights
- WCC Defensive Player of the Year (2015); Second Team All-WCC (2015); WCC All-Freshman Team (2012); Washington Mr. Basketball (2011)

Gary Bell Jr. (born October 12, 1992) is an American basketball coach and former player who is currently the associate head coach for Northern Arizona University. He played college basketball at Gonzaga University.

== High school ==
Bell attended Kentridge High School, in Kent, Washington, where he played high school basketball. He was named Washington Mr. Basketball in 2011.

== College career ==
Bell played college basketball for the Gonzaga Bulldogs from 2011 to 2015. He was named to the West Coast Conference All-Freshman team in 2012, and was named All-West Coast Conference Honorable Mention in 2013. He was named the West Coast Conference Defensive Player of the Year and All-West Coast Conference Second Team in 2015.

== Professional career ==
Bell began his pro career in the 2015–16 season, with the Polish League club Siarka Tarnobrzeg. He then moved to the Polish club Rosa Radom, before joining the French League club Cholet Basket. He joined the Greek League club Aris for the 2017–18 season. On June 28, 2018, Bell re-signed for another season with Aris.

== Coaching career ==
After his pro career ended, Bell began coaching as a graduate assistant with his college team, the Gonzaga Bulldogs. After two years, he became the Coordinator of Basketball Administration for Gonzaga before moving on to become an assistant coach at Northern Arizona University in August of 2022. In August of 2024, he was promoted to Associate Head Coach for the Lumberjacks.
